= Hidenohana Yukihide =

Former sumo wrestler from Japan

Personal information
- Native name: 秀ノ花 行秀
- Born: Yukihide Kikushima; 10 February 1965 (age 61) Nirasaki, Yamanashi, Japan
- Height: 1.85 m (6 ft 1 in)
- Weight: 144 kg (317 lb)

Sport
- Sport: Sumo
- Retired: March, 1994
- Heya: Hanakago → Hanaregoma
- Record: 294-257-53
- Debut: March, 1980
- Highest rank: Jūryō 5 (July, 1988)
- Championships: 1 (Jūryō); 1 (Sandanme); 1 (Jonidan)
- Updated on Sep. 2012

Hidenohana Yukihide (born 10 February 1965 as Yukihide Kikushima) is a former sumo wrestler from Nirasaki, Yamanashi, Japan.

One of the few professional sumo wrestlers from Yamanashi Prefecture, he was recruited by yokozuna Wajima of the Hanakago stable. He made his professional debut in March 1980, alongside Kotofuji and future professional wrestler Hanaarashi but never reached the top division. His highest rank was jūryō 5. He reached the second division eight years after his professional debut. He won the jūryō division yūshō or championship in his debut tournament in the division (the first wrestler to achieve this since Kotochitose in 1979), but then never won another bout as a sekitori, as he suffered a left knee medial collateral ligament injury in training with members of the Nihon University sumo club (including later top division wrestler Daishoyama) and was forced to withdraw from the next tournament after ten straight losses. He had been ineligible for the kōshō seido rank protection as the injury had not taken place in a tournament, and he was demoted to makushita. He never managed to return to jūryō and retired from active competition in March 1994. He performed the yumitori-shiki bow-twirling ceremony from November 1990 to July 1991.

== Career record ==
Hidenohana Yukihide
Year	January Hatsu basho, Tokyo	March Haru basho, Osaka	May Natsu basho, Tokyo	July Nagoya basho, Nagoya	September Aki basho, Tokyo	November Kyūshū basho, Fukuoka
1980	x	(Maezumo)	West Jonokuchi #25; 2–5	West Jonokuchi #16; 6–1	West Jonidan #77; Sat out due to injury 0–0–7	West Jonokuchi #1; 4–3
1981	West Jonidan #98; 3–4	East Jonidan #108; 5–2	West Jonidan #76; 3–4	West Jonidan #86; 4–3	East Jonidan #62; 2–5	East Jonidan #83; 4–3
1982	East Jonidan #58; 5–2	West Jonidan #8; 3–4	East Jonidan #29; 6–1	East Sandanme #58; 2–5	East Sandanme #83; 3–4	East Jonidan #10; 4–3
1983	East Sandanme #78; 4–3	East Sandanme #60; 4–3	West Sandanme #42; 4–3	West Sandanme #30; 3–4	West Sandanme #46; 6–1	West Sandanme #1; 2–5
1984	West Sandanme #25; 5–2	East Makushita #59; 4–3	East Makushita #46; 2–5	East Sandanme #10; 2–5	West Sandanme #37; 4–3	West Sandanme #22; 5–2
1985	East Makushita #54; 4–3	East Makushita #37; 4–3	West Makushita #25; Sat out due to injury 0–0–7	East Sandanme #6; 4–3	West Makushita #56; 5–2	West Makushita #35; 3–4
1986	East Makushita #49; 5–2	East Makushita #31; 6–1	East Makushita #14; 5–2	East Makushita #7; 1–6	West Makushita #32; 3–4	East Makushita #41; 5–2
1987	West Makushita #26; 4–3	West Makushita #18; 2–5	East Makushita #42; 4–3	West Makushita #33; 5–2	East Makushita #18; 4–3	East Makushita #10; 4–3
1988	East Makushita #7; 5–2	West Makushita #1; 4–3	West Jūryō #13; 11–4–P; Champion	East Jūryō #5; 0–11–4	West Makushita #3; Sat out due to injury 0–0–7	West Makushita #43; Sat out due to injury 0–0–7
1989	West Sandanme #23; Sat out due to injury 0–0–7	East Sandanme #83; 7–0–P; Champion	East Makushita #53; 2–5	West Sandanme #16; 3–4	East Sandanme #31; 3–4	West Sandanme #47; Sat out due to injury 0–0–7
1990	East Jonidan #8; Sat out due to injury 0–0–7	West Jonidan #78; 7–0–P; Champion	West Sandanme #73; 5–2	East Sandanme #43; 4–3	East Sandanme #26; 3–4	West Sandanme #37; 5–2
1991	West Sandanme #9; 5–2	West Makushita #48; 4–3	West Makushita #38; 2–5	East Makushita #59; 3–4	West Sandanme #12; 5–2	East Makushita #50; 6–1
1992	East Makushita #24; 5–2	West Makushita #10; 1–6	West Makushita #37; 3–4	West Makushita #45; 2–5	East Sandanme #5; 5–2	East Makushita #43; 6–1
1993	East Makushita #20; 1–6	East Makushita #46; 2–5	East Sandanme #6; 5–2	West Makushita #44; 2–5	East Sandanme #6; 3–4	West Sandanme #20; 3–4
1994	West Sandanme #35; 2–5	West Sandanme #68; Retired; 1–6	x	x	x	x
Record given as wins–losses–absences Top division champion Top division runner-up Retired Lower divisions Non-participation Sanshō key: F=Fighting spirit; O=Outstanding performance; T=Technique Also shown: ★=Kinboshi; P=Playoff(s); Divisions: Makuuchi — Jūryō — Makushita — Sandanme — Jonidan — Jonokuchi Makuuchi ranks: Yokozuna — Ōzeki — Sekiwake — Komusubi — Maegashira

== See also ==
- Glossary of sumo terms
- List of past sumo wrestlers
- List of sumo tournament second division champions
