= Kototsubaki Katsuyuki =

Sumo wrestler

Personal information
- Native name: 琴椿 克之
- Born: Katsuyuki Tokashiki; 6 December 1960 (age 65) Naha, Okinawa, Japan
- Height: 1.88 m (6 ft 2 in)
- Weight: 145 kg (320 lb)

Sport
- Sport: Sumo
- Retired: March, 1995
- Heya: Sadogatake
- Record: 530-481-51
- Debut: March, 1976
- Highest rank: Maegashira 3 (July, 1992)
- Elder name: Shiratama
- Updated on Sep. 2012

Kototsubaki Katsuyuki (琴椿 克之) (born 6 December 1960 as Katsuyuki Tokashiki) is a former sumo wrestler from Naha, Okinawa, Japan.

== Early life ==
Katsuyuki was born in Naha, Okinawa on 6 December, 1960. He practiced judo in junior high school, and by the time he was a third year junior high school student, he was 180cm tall, and being scouted by high schools outside the prefecture, including Kokushikan High School.

Katsuyuki was scouted for sumo by stablemaster Sadogatake (former 53rd Yokozuna Kotozakura), who was visiting Okinawa and was originally interested in Katsuyuki’s older brother. His brother turned down the opportunity, but recommended Katsuyuki to Sadogatake instead.

In 1976, at the age of 15, Katsuyuki chose to join the Sadogatake sumo stable, rather than entering high school.

== Sumo career ==
=== As a wrestler ===
He made his professional debut in March 1976, and reached the top division in January 1991. His highest rank was maegashira 3. His favourite techniques were tsuki/oshi (pushing and thrusting).

When Katsuyuki was promoted to Sekitori, he was only the second wrestler from Okinawa to have reached that rank.

=== As an elder ===
He retired in March 1995, and became an elder in the Japan Sumo Association under the name Shiratama (白玉). He joined the Sumo Association's special executive group, below the 10 directors and 3 deputy directors, on 30 March 2022.

== Legacy ==
Katsuyuki has worked to promote sumo in Okinawa, and develop more wrestlers from the prefecture. The Okinawa Prefectural Sumo Championship has named the trophy given to the winner the Kototsubaki Cup Okinawa Prefecture Sumo Championship, after Katsuyuki’s wrestling name.

== Career record ==
Kototsubaki Katsuyuki
Year	January Hatsu basho, Tokyo	March Haru basho, Osaka	May Natsu basho, Tokyo	July Nagoya basho, Nagoya	September Aki basho, Tokyo	November Kyūshū basho, Fukuoka
1976	x	(Maezumo)	West Jonokuchi #9; 6–1	East Jonidan #53; 2–5	West Jonidan #80; 4–3	East Jonidan #57; 4–3
1977	East Jonidan #33; 3–4	West Jonidan #41; 3–4	East Jonidan #53; 5–2	West Jonidan #5; 1–6	East Jonidan #44; 3–4	East Jonidan #52; 3–4
1978	East Jonidan #62; 6–1	East Jonidan #3; 1–6	East Jonidan #38; 6–1	West Sandanme #73; 2–5	East Jonidan #13; 2–1–4	East Jonidan #33; 6–1–P
1979	East Sandanme #66; 5–2	West Sandanme #38; 4–3	East Sandanme #25; 2–5	East Sandanme #49; 4–3	West Sandanme #34; 3–4	East Sandanme #47; Sat out due to injury 0–0–7
1980	West Jonidan #2; 6–1	East Sandanme #35; 5–2	East Sandanme #11; 3–4	West Sandanme #25; 6–1	East Makushita #48; 2–5	West Sandanme #8; 0–1–6
1981	East Sandanme #43; 0–1–6	East Sandanme #43; 4–3	West Sandanme #30; 5–2	West Sandanme #3; 4–3	West Makushita #51; 5–2	West Makushita #33; 4–3
1982	West Makushita #20; 2–5	East Makushita #37; 4–3	West Makushita #26; 4–3	East Makushita #21; 3–4	East Makushita #30; 3–4	East Makushita #44; 6–1–P
1983	East Makushita #19; 2–5	East Makushita #38; 5–2	East Makushita #21; 4–3	East Makushita #14; 3–4	West Makushita #22; 4–3	East Makushita #16; 4–3
1984	East Makushita #8; 5–2	East Makushita #2; 2–5	West Makushita #17; 4–3	East Makushita #11; 3–4	West Makushita #18; 2–5	East Makushita #41; 6–1
1985	East Makushita #18; 3–4	West Makushita #28; 5–2	West Makushita #13; 4–3	East Makushita #9; 6–1	West Makushita #1; 5–2	East Jūryō #13; 5–10
1986	East Makushita #5; 2–5	West Makushita #22; 3–4	East Makushita #35; 4–3	East Makushita #23; 4–3	East Makushita #15; 4–3	East Makushita #12; 4–3
1987	East Makushita #8; 4–3	East Makushita #5; 2–5	West Makushita #22; 5–2	East Makushita #11; 5–2	East Makushita #3; 3–4	East Makushita #7; 2–5
1988	East Makushita #22; 3–4	West Makushita #30; 6–1	West Makushita #13; 5–2	West Makushita #7; 3–4	East Makushita #13; 2–5	East Makushita #30; 4–3
1989	West Makushita #24; 5–2	West Makushita #13; 4–3	East Makushita #9; 6–1	East Makushita #2; 6–1	West Jūryō #11; 9–6	East Jūryō #9; 8–7
1990	East Jūryō #5; 6–9	West Jūryō #8; 8–7	East Jūryō #4; 6–9	East Jūryō #9; 9–6	West Jūryō #3; 8–7	West Jūryō #1; 8–7
1991	West Maegashira #13; 9–6	East Maegashira #6; 7–8	West Maegashira #9; 7–8	East Maegashira #12; 9–6	West Maegashira #8; 8–7	West Maegashira #5; 4–11
1992	West Maegashira #13; 7–8	West Maegashira #14; 8–7	East Maegashira #9; 10–5	West Maegashira #3; 5–5–5	East Maegashira #10; 5–10	East Maegashira #14; 10–4–1
1993	East Maegashira #9; Sat out due to injury 0–0–15	East Maegashira #9; 4–11	West Jūryō #1; 5–10	West Jūryō #7; 8–7	East Jūryō #7; 10–5	East Jūryō #3; 11–4–P
1994	East Maegashira #16; 7–8	East Jūryō #3; 7–8	West Jūryō #4; 6–9	East Jūryō #8; 11–4	East Jūryō #3; 5–10	West Jūryō #8; 3–10–2
1995	East Makushita #6; 3–4	East Makushita #10; Retired; 0–2–5	x	x	x	x
Record given as wins–losses–absences Top division champion Top division runner-up Retired Lower divisions Non-participation Sanshō key: F=Fighting spirit; O=Outstanding performance; T=Technique Also shown: ★=Kinboshi; P=Playoff(s); Divisions: Makuuchi — Jūryō — Makushita — Sandanme — Jonidan — Jonokuchi Makuuchi ranks: Yokozuna — Ōzeki — Sekiwake — Komusubi — Maegashira

== See also ==
- Glossary of sumo terms
- List of past sumo wrestlers
- List of sumo elders
