= Tochinowaka Kiyotaka =

Japanese sumo wrestler

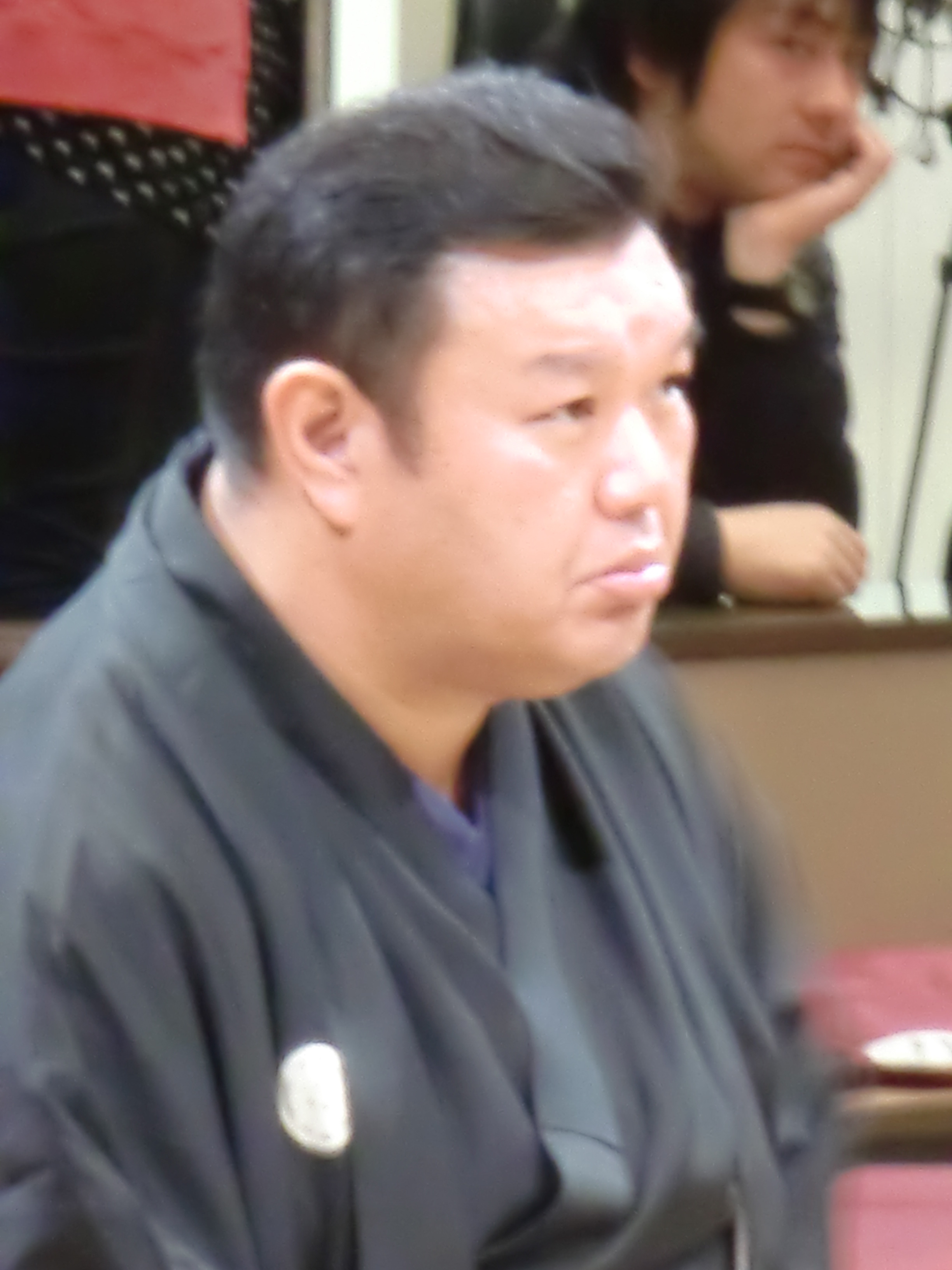

Personal information
- Native name: 栃乃和歌 清隆
- Born: Kiyotaka Kaseda; 22 May 1962 (age 64) Wakayama, Japan
- Height: 1.90 m (6 ft 3 in)
- Weight: 160 kg (350 lb)

Sport
- Sport: Sumo
- Retired: July 1999
- Heya: Kasugano
- Record: 588-621-24
- Debut: March 1985
- Highest rank: Sekiwake (September 1987)
- Elder name: Kasugano
- Championships: 1 (Jūryō); 1 (Makushita)
- Special Prizes: Fighting Spirit (3); Outstanding Performance (2); Technique (1)
- Gold Stars: 4 Hokutoumi (2); Ōnokuni; Takanohana II
- Updated on August 2007

Tochinowaka Kiyotaka (born 22 May 1962 as Kiyotaka Kaseda) is a former sumo wrestler from Wakayama Prefecture, Japan. A former amateur champion, he turned professional in 1985, reaching the top makuuchi division in 1987. His highest rank was sekiwake. He was a runner-up in one tournament and earned six special prizes and four kinboshi. After 76 tournaments and 1114 bouts in the top division he retired in 1999. He is now an elder of the Japan Sumo Association and the head coach of Kasugano stable.

== Career ==
He was born in Shimotsu, Kaisō District. He was named Kiyotaka after the great yokozuna of the 1950s, Tochinishiki Kiyotaka. He played baseball in junior high school and ambitions to be a professional, but switched to sumo in high school due to his size. He was an amateur champion at Meiji University, and finished runner-up in the national collegiate yokozuna competition. He made his professional debut in March 1985 in the makushita division, having been given makushita tsukedashi status because of his amateur achievements. The first graduate of Meiji University to have a major impact in professional sumo, he quickly moved up the ranks, progressing through jūryō in just two tournaments and reaching the top makuuchi division in January 1987. He was also the first top division wrestler from Wakayama Prefecture for nearly 40 years. He reached his highest rank of sekiwake in September 1987, and defeated a yokozuna and two ozeki in his first three bouts at the rank.

Tochinowaka remained in the top division for 76 tournaments, winning six special prizes and earning four gold stars for defeating yokozuna. He was runner-up to Konishiki in the tournament of March 1992 and looked set to launch a drive for ozeki promotion, but he was injured in the next tournament and had to withdraw. He made his last appearance in the sanyaku ranks in March 1994. He carried on fighting until the age of 37, retiring in July 1999 when he was the oldest man in the top division.

He was utterly unable to defeat Musashimaru, losing to him 23 times in 23 meetings, and he also lost all 14 bouts he contested with Chiyonofuji. His wins over yokozuna were against Futahaguro in September 1987, Onokuni in January 1988, September 1988 and September 1989, Hokutoumi in January 1990, July 1991 and November 1991, and finally Takanohana in January 1997.

He was a heavy smoker during his active days.

== Fighting style ==
Tochinowaka was at his strongest when he could get a left hand outside, right hand inside grip on his opponent's mawashi, or migi-yotsu. His most commonly used techniques were yorikiri, oshi dashi and uwatenage.

== Retirement from sumo ==
Tochinowaka remained in the sumo world as a toshiyori or elder, initially under the name of Takenawa. In February 2003 his former stablemaster, ex yokozuna Tochinoumi, retired and passed on ownership of the Kasugano name and stable to him. Tochinowaka produced his first top division wrestler, Tochiozan, in May 2007, and Tochinoshin and Kimurayama followed in May and July 2008. In 2009 Kasugano passed on his Tochinowaka shikona to Lee Dae Won, a Korean born wrestler with Japanese citizenship, who reached juryo in September 2010 and makuuchi in May 2011. Kasugano also works as a judge of tournament bouts. He is on the board of directors of the Japan Sumo Association, and has been the head of the public relations department. and the regional tour department.

In October 2011 he was severely reprimanded by the Sumo Association for beating Tochinoshin and two other wrestlers with a golf club after they repeatedly broke stable rules on curfews and wearing Western style clothes instead of kimono in public. Kasugano admitted responsibility and said, "I honestly think I went too far and I regret it."

He took over the responsibility for running the regional tour department after Takanohana was removed from the position because of the assault by Harumafuji on Takanoiwa which occurred on a tour in October 2017. However Kasugano was himself severely warned after a top gyōji resigned over a sexual assault which happened on another tour in December 2017. In December 2019 his department ordered Takagenji to take part in an exhibition while suffering from influenza, which prompted the Sumo Association's board to announce that in future affected wrestlers would be kept in isolation instead.

== Career record ==
Tochinowaka Kiyotaka
| Year | January Hatsu basho, Tokyo | March Haru basho, Osaka | May Natsu basho, Tokyo | July Nagoya basho, Nagoya | September Aki basho, Tokyo | November Kyūshū basho, Fukuoka |
|---|---|---|---|---|---|---|
| 1985 | x | Makushita tsukedashi #60; 6–1 | West Makushita #31; 3–4 | West Makushita #43; 5–2 | West Makushita #25; 5–2 | West Makushita #13; 4–3 |
| 1986 | East Makushita #8; 3–4 | East Makushita #15; 4–3 | East Makushita #10; 6–1 | West Makushita #2; 7–0; Champion | West Jūryō #8; 10–5 | West Jūryō #3; 10–5–PP; Champion |
| 1987 | East Maegashira #12; 7–8 | East Maegashira #13; 10–5; F | West Maegashira #4; 10–5 | East Komusubi #1; 9–6; O | West Sekiwake #1; 8–7 | East Sekiwake #1; 5–10 |
| 1988 | West Maegashira #1; 8–7 ★ | West Sekiwake #1; 7–8 | East Komusubi #1; 9–6 | East Komusubi #1; 9–6 | East Komusubi #1; 7–8 | West Maegashira #1; Sat out due to injury 0–0–15 |
| 1989 | East Maegashira #11; 7–8 | West Maegashira #12; 8–7 | West Maegashira #7; 10–5 | West Maegashira #1; 8–7 | East Komusubi #1; 5–10 | West Maegashira #3; 7–8 |
| 1990 | East Maegashira #4; 10–5; F★ | East Maegashira #1; 8–7 | West Sekiwake #1; 4–11 | West Maegashira #5; 8–7 | East Maegashira #1; 9–6 | East Komusubi #1; 8–7 |
| 1991 | West Sekiwake #1; 8–7 | West Sekiwake #1; 6–9 | East Maegashira #2; 7–8 | East Maegashira #3; 8–7 ★ | East Maegashira #1; 11–4; F | East Komusubi #1; 10–5 |
| 1992 | East Komusubi #1; 8–7 | East Komusubi #1; 11–4; TO | East Sekiwake #1; 2–9–4 | East Maegashira #5; 5–10 | East Maegashira #11; 9–6 | West Maegashira #3; 7–8 |
| 1993 | East Maegashira #6; 8–7 | West Maegashira #1; 4–11 | East Maegashira #8; 6–9 | West Maegashira #13; 10–5 | East Maegashira #3; 6–9 | East Maegashira #6; 8–7 |
| 1994 | West Maegashira #1; 8–7 | East Komusubi #1; 3–12 | West Maegashira #7; 8–7 | East Maegashira #1; 5–10 | West Maegashira #5; 6–9 | West Maegashira #7; 8–7 |
| 1995 | East Maegashira #2; 4–11 | West Maegashira #6; 6–9 | West Maegashira #8; 8–7 | East Maegashira #2; 3–12 | West Maegashira #8; 8–7 | East Maegashira #2; 5–10 |
| 1996 | East Maegashira #6; 6–9 | West Maegashira #8; 6–9 | West Maegashira #12; 9–6 | West Maegashira #10; 7–8 | East Maegashira #13; 8–7 | East Maegashira #8; 8–7 |
| 1997 | East Maegashira #4; 4–11 ★ | West Maegashira #9; 9–6 | East Maegashira #2; 5–10 | East Maegashira #6; 5–10 | East Maegashira #11; 8–7 | West Maegashira #4; 3–12 |
| 1998 | West Maegashira #12; 9–6 | West Maegashira #5; 5–10 | West Maegashira #7; 8–7 | East Maegashira #4; 3–12 | East Maegashira #11; 8–7 | East Maegashira #3; 5–10 |
| 1999 | East Maegashira #6; 6–9 | West Maegashira #8; 8–7 | East Maegashira #5; 5–10 | West Maegashira #9; Retired; 2–8–5 | x | x |
Record given as wins–losses–absences Top division champion Top division runner-up Retired Lower divisions Non-participation Sanshō key: F=Fighting spirit; O=Outstanding performance; T=Technique Also shown: ★=Kinboshi; P=Playoff(s); Divisions: Makuuchi — Jūryō — Makushita — Sandanme — Jonidan — Jonokuchi Makuuchi ranks: Yokozuna — Ōzeki — Sekiwake — Komusubi — Maegashira

== See also ==
- List of sumo tournament top division runners-up
- List of sumo tournament second division champions
- Glossary of sumo terms
- List of sumo elders
- List of past sumo wrestlers
- List of sekiwake
