= Ōzutsu Takeshi =

Sumo wrestler (born 1956)

Personal information
- Native name: 巨砲 丈士
- Born: Takatoshi Matsumoto; 18 April 1956 (age 70) Mie, Japan
- Height: 1.83 m (6 ft 0 in)
- Weight: 147 kg (324 lb)

Sport
- Sport: Sumo
- Retired: May, 1992
- Heya: Taihō
- Record: 753–809–25
- Debut: May, 1971
- Highest rank: Sekiwake (May, 1981)
- Elder name: Tateyama
- Championships: 1 (Jūryō)
- Special Prizes: Outstanding Performance (2); Fighting Spirit (1); Technique (1)
- Gold Stars: 10; Wakanohana II (4); Chiyonofuji (2); Wajima; Kitanoumi; Mienoumi; Takanosato
- Updated on June 2020

Ōzutsu Takeshi (born 18 April 1956 as Takatoshi Matsumoto) is a former sumo wrestler from Mie, Japan. Beginning his professional career in May 1971, he was ranked in the top makuuchi division continuously from March 1979 to January 1992, and his record of 1170 consecutive bouts there is the second best in history after Takamiyama. His highest rank was sekiwake. He was runner-up in one tournament and earned ten kinboshi or gold stars for defeating yokozuna. He also won four sanshō or special prizes. He wrestled for Taihō stable and after his retirement in May 1992 he worked there as a coach before leaving the Japan Sumo Association in 2008.

== Career ==
Born in Yokkaichi, he came from a sumo family as his father, Ryuichi Matsumoto, was a professional sumo wrestler known as Kenryu Taketora who reached a highest rank of jūryō 1 in 1955. Ōzutsu joined Nishonoseki stable in May 1971 at the age of 15. The great yokozuna Taihō retired in the same tournament and that December he followed Taihō to a newly created heya, Taihō stable. In his early days he wrestled under a different shikona, Daishin. In July 1977 he became a sekitori for the first time upon promotion to the jūryō division. He was injured during the November 1977 tournament and had to withdraw, dropping back to makushita. However, he was never to miss another bout in his career. Upon his return to jūryō in March 1978 he adopted the shikona of Ōzutsu (literally "big cannon"; he was sometimes nicknamed "Top Gun"). In September 1978 he claimed the jūryō championship with an 11–4 record (his only career yusho), and in January 1979, after losing a playoff for the championship to Ōshio he was promoted to the top makuuchi division for the March 1979 tournament.

Ōzutsu won the Fighting Spirit Prize in his second top division tournament in May 1979, and in July he defeated two yokozuna, Wakanohana and Mienoumi, the first of his ten career kinboshi. In March 1980 he made his san'yaku debut at komusubi but fell short with a 6–9 record. He was runner-up to Kitanoumi with an 11–4 record in March 1981 and was promoted to sekiwake, the highest rank he was to achieve. He held it on two further occasions, in July 1981 and November 1983, and made his final appearance in san'yaku at komusubi in November 1984, continuing as a rank-and-file maegashira for the rest of his makuuchi career.

He won his first two bouts against Chiyonofuji before the latter became a yokozuna, and earned two kinboshi from him in September 1984 and March 1986, but was defeated by him on every one of the 37 other occasions they met. He was the man Chiyonofuji beat in September 1989 to reach 965 career wins, more than any other wrestler in history.

He remained in the top division for 78 consecutive tournaments but was finally demoted in January 1992 after recording only a 4–11 score at maegashira 15. His 1170th and final bout in makuuchi was a win over Mainoumi. He announced his retirement from sumo two tournaments later at the age of 36 after facing certain demotion to the makushita division.

== Retirement from sumo ==
Ōzutsu remained in sumo as an elder of the Japan Sumo Association, and worked as a coach at Taihō stable, initially under the name Ōtake Oyakata. In 1997 he switched to the Tateyama kabu when it was vacated by the former ōzeki Daiju. In 2003 Taihō retired as head coach and the former Takatōriki took over, renaming the heya Ōtake stable. Ōzutsu continued to work as a coach there until 2008 when his Tateyama stock, which he was only borrowing, was needed by the retiring Tamakasuga. Ōzutsu had to leave the Sumo Association as a result. He now runs a French-style restaurant in Yokohama.

== Fighting style ==
Ōzutsu was a yotsu-sumo wrestler, preferring to fight on the mawashi rather than push his opponents. His favourite grip was migi-yotsu, with a right hand inside and left hand outside his opponent's arms. His most common winning kimarite was yori-kiri or force out, but he also regularly used his outside grip to win by uwatenage (overarm throw) and uwatedashinage (pulling overarm throw). He was also fond of tsuridashi, the lift out.

== Career record ==
Ōzutsu Takeshi
Year	January Hatsu basho, Tokyo	March Haru basho, Osaka	May Natsu basho, Tokyo	July Nagoya basho, Nagoya	September Aki basho, Tokyo	November Kyūshū basho, Fukuoka
1971	x	x	(Maezumo)	East Jonokuchi #6; 4–3	East Jonidan #88; 4–3	East Jonidan #42; 3–1
1972	East Jonidan #4; 0–3	East Jonidan #38; Sat out due to injury 0–0–7	East Jonidan #38; 4–3	West Jonidan #15; 3–4	East Jonidan #24; 5–2	East Sandanme #72; 5–2
1973	East Sandanme #35; 3–4	East Sandanme #45; 3–4	East Sandanme #54; 6–1	West Sandanme #17; 4–3	West Sandanme #5; 3–4	West Sandanme #20; 4–3
1974	East Sandanme #8; 3–4	West Sandanme #18; 6–1	East Makushita #48; 4–3	West Makushita #43; 4–3	East Makushita #36; 4–3	West Makushita #28; 2–5
1975	West Makushita #51; 2–5	West Sandanme #13; 4–3	West Sandanme #3; 5–2	West Makushita #44; 4–3	East Makushita #34; 5–2	East Makushita #17; 3–4
1976	East Makushita #24; 3–4	West Makushita #32; 0–1–6	West Sandanme #4; Sat out due to injury 0–0–7	West Sandanme #49; 6–1	East Sandanme #10; 5–2	East Makushita #42; 4–3
1977	West Makushita #33; 5–2	East Makushita #18; 6–1	West Makushita #4; 5–2	East Jūryō #12; 8–7	East Jūryō #11; 7–8	West Jūryō #13; 6–4–5
1978	West Makushita #4; 5–2	East Jūryō #11; 9–6	East Jūryō #8; 7–8	East Jūryō #10; 8–7	West Jūryō #8; 11–4; Champion	East Jūryō #2; 6–9
1979	East Jūryō #7; 11–4–P	West Maegashira #13; 8–7	East Maegashira #9; 10–5; F	West Maegashira #1; 6–9	East Maegashira #5; 5–10 ★★	East Maegashira #10; 8–7
1980	West Maegashira #5; 9–6	East Komusubi #1; 6–9	West Maegashira #3; 5–10 ★	West Maegashira #6; 9–6	East Maegashira #1; 5–10 ★	West Maegashira #4; 8–7
1981	East Maegashira #1; 8–7	East Komusubi #1; 11–4; T	East Sekiwake #2; 8–7	West Sekiwake #1; 6–9	West Maegashira #2; 9–6; O★	West Komusubi #1; 7–8
1982	West Maegashira #1; 8–7 ★	West Komusubi #1; 4–11	West Maegashira #4; 7–8	East Maegashira #5; 6–9 ★	West Maegashira #8; 8–7	West Maegashira #4; 6–9
1983	East Maegashira #7; 9–6	West Komusubi #1; 6–9	East Maegashira #2; 8–7	East Komusubi #1; 5–10	East Maegashira #4; 9–6; O	East Sekiwake #1; 4–11
1984	East Maegashira #6; 9–6	East Maegashira #1; 5–10	West Maegashira #5; 8–7	East Komusubi #1; 7–8	West Maegashira #1; 8–7 ★★	East Komusubi #1; 5–10
1985	East Maegashira #2; 5–10	East Maegashira #7; 8–7	West Maegashira #3; 5–10	East Maegashira #8; 8–7	East Maegashira #1; 5–10	West Maegashira #8; 9–6
1986	East Maegashira #2; 7–8	East Maegashira #4; 6–9 ★	West Maegashira #9; 9–6	West Maegashira #3; 6–9	East Maegashira #6; 7–8	East Maegashira #8; 8–7
1987	East Maegashira #3; 4–11	West Maegashira #10; 9–6	West Maegashira #3; 4–11	West Maegashira #8; 8–7	West Maegashira #2; 4–11	East Maegashira #8; 8–7
1988	East Maegashira #2; 4–11	West Maegashira #6; 7–8	West Maegashira #8; 7–8	East Maegashira #10; 8–7	East Maegashira #5; 5–10	East Maegashira #10; 8–7
1989	West Maegashira #5; 8–7	West Maegashira #2; 4–11	West Maegashira #8; 8–7	West Maegashira #4; 8–7	West Maegashira #2; 5–10	East Maegashira #7; 8–7
1990	West Maegashira #1; 6–9	West Maegashira #4; 5–10	East Maegashira #8; 9–6	West Maegashira #2; 5–10	East Maegashira #8; 8–7	East Maegashira #2; 4–11
1991	West Maegashira #10; 8–7	West Maegashira #5; 6–9	East Maegashira #12; 7–8	West Maegashira #14; 8–7	West Maegashira #10; 6–9	West Maegashira #13; 7–8
1992	East Maegashira #15; 4–11	West Jūryō #5; 7–8	East Jūryō #7; Retired; 4–11	x	x	x
Record given as wins–losses–absences Top division champion Top division runner-up Retired Lower divisions Non-participation Sanshō key: F=Fighting spirit; O=Outstanding performance; T=Technique Also shown: ★=Kinboshi; P=Playoff(s); Divisions: Makuuchi — Jūryō — Makushita — Sandanme — Jonidan — Jonokuchi Makuuchi ranks: Yokozuna — Ōzeki — Sekiwake — Komusubi — Maegashira

== See also ==
- List of sumo record holders
- List of sumo tournament top division runners-up
- List of sumo tournament second division champions
- List of past sumo wrestlers
- List of sekiwake
