= Wakasegawa Yoshimitsu =

Japanese sumo wrestler (1962–2011)

- Wakasegawa takes part in an exhibition at the Yokota Air Base, October 1986.

Personal information
- Native name: 若瀬川 剛充
- Born: Wataru Sato; July 28, 1962 Sakata, Yamagata, Japan
- Died: October 8, 2011 (aged 49)
- Height: 1.89 m (6 ft 2 1/2 in)
- Weight: 150 kg (330 lb; 24 st)

Sport
- Sport: Sumo
- Retired: July, 1992
- Heya: Isegahama
- Record: 546-519-41
- Debut: March, 1978
- Highest rank: Maegashira 1 (July, 1983)
- Championships: 3 (Jūryō); 2 (Makushita)
- Gold Stars: 1 (Ōnokuni)

Wakasegawa Yoshimitsu (born Wataru Sato; July 28, 1962 - October 8, 2011) was a sumo wrestler from Sakata, Yamagata, Japan. He made his professional debut in 1978, reaching the top makuuchi division for the first time in 1983. His highest rank was maegashira 1. He retired in 1992 and worked in the restaurant business after leaving sumo.

== Career ==
He was recruited by former ozeki Kiyokuni in 1978, who had taken over Isegahama stable the previous year. He made his first appearance on the dohyo in March 1978, and he rose through the lower ranks fairly quickly. He first reached the sekitori ranks in September 1980, having won the makushita division championship with a perfect 7-0 record in the previous tournament. However he lasted only one tournament in juryo before being demoted, and after missing the first two tournaments of 1981 he fell to the bottom of the makushita division. He came back strongly to earn promotion back to the juryo division in March 1982, but was demoted again immediately. In May 1982 however, he would win the makushita championship, winning out in a seven-way playoff. He then took his first juryo championship in July 1982 with an 11-4 record. He reached the top division for the first time in January 1983 at the age of just 20. To make the occasion he changed the second part of his shikona or fighting name from his own given name of Wataru to Taiji.

Wakasegawa was regarded as a wrestler with great promise. However, after reaching what proved to be his highest ever rank of maegashira 1 in July 1983, he fell back to the juryo division in November 1983 after withdrawing from the tournament with a dislocated shoulder. After developing diabetes his performances suffered and he remained in juryo for most of the next four years. In 1986 he visited the Yokota Air Base with his colleagues from Isegahama stable to take part in exhibition bouts with American schoolchildren. He reappeared in makuuchi in July 1987 (changing part of his shikona again, from Taiji to Yoshimitsu) but only for one tournament. After winning his third juryo championship in March 1988 with a 13-2 record he earned promotion to makuuchi for the fourth time, finally establishing himself as a top division regular. He never won a sansho or special prize, but did defeat yokozuna Onokuni in November 1988 to earn a kinboshi. He also defeated ozeki Konishiki in this tournament. He injured his back during the March 1989 tournament after taking part in a strenuous training session with junior wrestler Akebono, later to become a yokozuna. Upon the demotion of Ozutsu in January 1992 he became the man with the earliest top division experience left in makuuchi (although his service was not continuous). He was to lose top division status himself in May of that year after suffering from gastroenteritis and retired just one tournament after that.

== Retirement from sumo ==
Although Wakasegawa was qualified to become an oyakata or coach, he was unable to purchase the necessary elder stock and so left the sumo world upon retirement in July 1992. He ran a ramen restaurant before having to give it up due to poor health. Having suffered from diabetes for many years, he died in 2011 at the age of 49.

== Fighting style ==
Wakasegawa was a straightforward yotsu-sumo wrestler, preferring to use grappling techniques to pushing or thrusting. He won most of his bouts with a simple yori-kiri, or force out, but he also liked tsuki-otoshi (thrust over), Tsuki-dashi (thrust out), hiki-ostoshi (pull down) and various nage or throws. His skill on the mawashi was noted by experts.

== Career record ==
Wakasegawa Yoshimitsu
Year	January Hatsu basho, Tokyo	March Haru basho, Osaka	May Natsu basho, Tokyo	July Nagoya basho, Nagoya	September Aki basho, Tokyo	November Kyūshū basho, Fukuoka
1978	x	(Maezumo)	West Jonokuchi #6; 6–1–P	East Jonidan #45; 5–2	West Jonidan #5; 4–3	East Sandanme #71; 4–3
1979	East Sandanme #60; 5–2	East Sandanme #30; 4–3	East Sandanme #18; 5–2	East Makushita #55; 3–4	West Sandanme #5; 4–3	East Makushita #56; 4–3
1980	West Makushita #46; 4–3	East Makushita #34; 4–3	West Makushita #25; 6–1	West Makushita #8; 7–0; Champion	West Jūryō #12; 5–10	East Makushita #9; 6–1
1981	East Makushita #3; Sat out due to injury 0–0–7	East Makushita #28; Sat out due to injury 0–0–7	East Makushita #59; 6–1–P	West Makushita #29; 6–1–P	East Makushita #10; 3–4	East Makushita #18; 6–1
1982	East Makushita #3; 5–2	West Jūryō #11; 7–8	West Makushita #1; 6–1–PPP; Champion	East Jūryō #7; 11–4; Champion	West Jūryō #1; 8–7	East Jūryō #1; 9–6
1983	West Maegashira #11; 9–6	West Maegashira #4; 4–11	East Maegashira #11; 10–5	West Maegashira #1; 5–10	East Maegashira #7; 5–10	West Maegashira #13; 4–7–4
1984	West Jūryō #6; Sat out due to injury 0–0–15	West Jūryō #6; 6–9	East Jūryō #10; 8–7	West Jūryō #7; 9–6	East Jūryō #4; 10–5	East Maegashira #14; 6–9
1985	East Jūryō #6; 7–8	West Jūryō #6; 10–5	West Jūryō #1; 4–11	West Jūryō #8; 9–6	West Jūryō #5; 5–10	East Jūryō #11; 10–5–PP; Champion
1986	West Jūryō #5; 7–8	East Jūryō #6; 8–7	West Jūryō #3; 8–7	East Jūryō #2; 6–9	East Jūryō #5; 9–6	West Jūryō #2; 6–9
1987	West Jūryō #5; 9–6	East Jūryō #1; 7–8	West Jūryō #3; 10–5	East Maegashira #13; 5–10	West Jūryō #3; 8–7	West Jūryō #2; 8–7
1988	East Jūryō #2; 8–7	West Jūryō #1; 13–2; Champion	West Maegashira #10; 9–6	East Maegashira #3; 6–9	East Maegashira #8; 8–7	West Maegashira #3; 5–10 ★
1989	West Maegashira #7; 10–5	East Maegashira #1; 1–7–7	East Maegashira #12; 8–7	West Maegashira #9; 8–7	West Maegashira #6; 6–9	West Maegashira #10; 8–7
1990	West Maegashira #4; 5–10	East Maegashira #12; 9–6	West Maegashira #4; 5–10	West Maegashira #11; 9–6	West Maegashira #6; 6–9	West Maegashira #10; 8–7
1991	West Maegashira #6; 8–7	East Maegashira #2; 5–10	West Maegashira #8; 8–7	East Maegashira #4; 6–9	East Maegashira #8; 8–7	East Maegashira #5; 6–9
1992	East Maegashira #9; 6–9	East Maegashira #13; 7–8	West Maegashira #14; 3–11–1	East Jūryō #7; Retired; 2–13	x	x
Record given as wins–losses–absences Top division champion Top division runner-up Retired Lower divisions Non-participation Sanshō key: F=Fighting spirit; O=Outstanding performance; T=Technique Also shown: ★=Kinboshi; P=Playoff(s); Divisions: Makuuchi — Jūryō — Makushita — Sandanme — Jonidan — Jonokuchi Makuuchi ranks: Yokozuna — Ōzeki — Sekiwake — Komusubi — Maegashira

== See also ==
- Glossary of sumo terms
- List of past sumo wrestlers
- List of sumo tournament second division champions
