= Tomonohana Shinya =

Japanese sumo wrestler

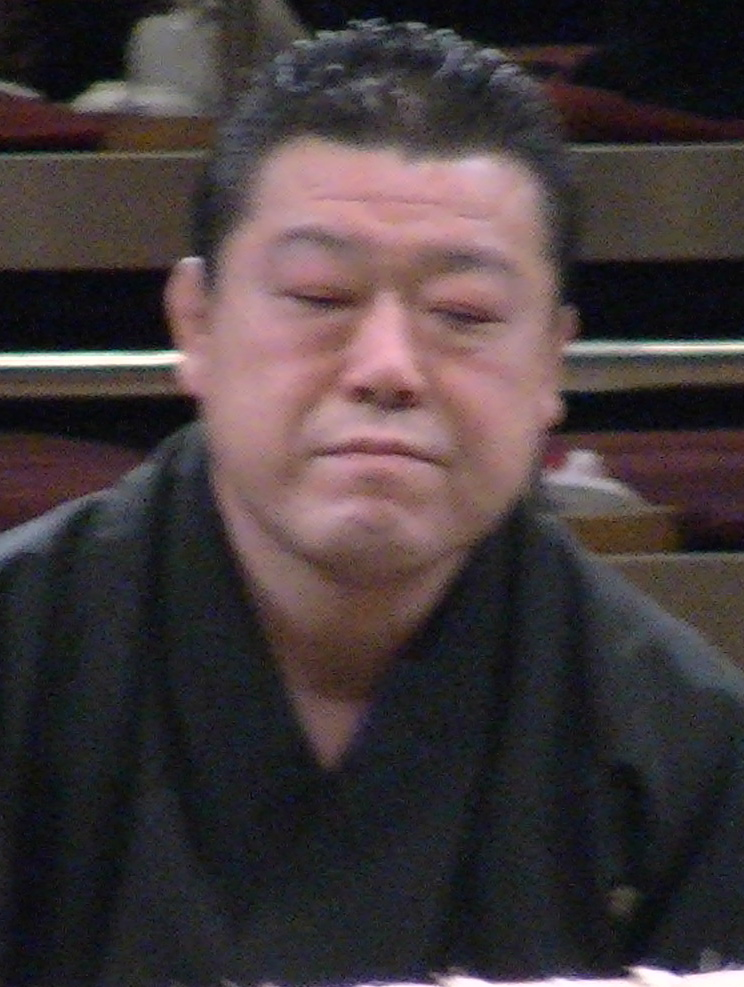

Personal information
- Native name: 智乃花 伸哉
- Born: Shinya Narimatsu; 23 June 1964 (age 62) Kumamoto, Japan
- Height: 1.75 m (5 ft 9 in)
- Weight: 113 kg (249 lb)

Sport
- Sport: Sumo
- Retired: November, 2001
- Heya: Tatsunami
- Record: 379-381-85
- Debut: March, 1992
- Highest rank: Komusubi (January, 1994)
- Elder name: Tamagaki
- Championships: 1 (Makushita)
- Special Prizes: Technique (2)
- Updated on July 2008

Tomonohana Shinya (born 23 June 1964 as Shinya Narimatsu) is a former sumo wrestler from Yatsushiro, Kumamoto Prefecture, Japan. His highest rank was komusubi. He is now a sumo coach.

== Career ==
He had been an amateur sumo champion at Nihon University but worked as a high school physical education teacher after graduation. He did not join the professional sport until March 1992, when he was nearly 28, an extraordinarily late age. (The Sumo Association have since changed its rules and all former amateurs must now make their professional debuts before the age of 25). He made his debut in the third highest makushita division, fighting out of Tatsunami stable. At just 174 cm (5 ft 8 1/2 in) and 100 kg (220 lb), he was not much bigger than Mainoumi, the lightest wrestler at the time. He began wrestling under his own surname of Narimatsu, but upon reaching sekitori status he adopted the formal shikona of Tomonohana, meaning "flower of wisdom."

Tomonohana had winning records or kachi-koshi in his first twelve tournaments, including winning an eight-way playoff for the third-division championship. He reached the second highest jūryō division in November 1992, taking just four tournaments, and the top makuuchi division in July 1993, following another four winning records. A popular wrestler, he was nicknamed "Sensei" because of his teaching background. He used a wide variety of techniques to counteract his light weight, and won the prestigious Ginō-shō, or technique prize, in two consecutive tournaments in September and November 1993. In January 1994 he reached the sanyaku ranks at komusubi, but turned in the first losing record of his career, 4–11, and never made the rank again. He was demoted back to jūryō in March 1996 and subsequent injuries prevented him from returning to the top division. Nevertheless, he carried on fighting until November 2001 when he announced his retirement at the age of 37.

== Fighting style ==
Tomonohana preferred a migi-yotsu or right hand inside, left hand outside grip on his opponent's mawashi, and his speciality was shitatenage, or underarm throw, which was his most common winning kimarite. He used 34 different kimarite during his career, some of them extremely rare. In January 1993 he defeated Hananokuni with izori, or backwards body drop, a technique that had not been seen at sekitori level since 1964.

== Retirement from sumo ==
Upon his retirement he temporarily used his old fighting name as an elder, under the jun-toshiyori system. In February 2003 he switched to the elder name of Asakayama owned by former ōzeki Kaiō, after it was vacated by ex-maegashira Ōwakamatsu who left the Sumo Association. He transferred from Tatsunami stable to coach at Tomozuna stable in April 2005. In March 2006 he obtained the Tamagaki stock upon the mandatory retirement of its previous owner, the former Wakanami.

Prior to the March 2024 tournament Tomonohana was named the acting master of Miyagino stable in the place of the former Hakuhō, following the latter's discipline over the behavior of former sumo competitor Hokuseihō. On March 27, he announced, as expected, that his position as acting master was to end immediately.

== Career record ==
Tomonohana Shinya
Year	January Hatsu basho, Tokyo	March Haru basho, Osaka	May Natsu basho, Tokyo	July Nagoya basho, Nagoya	September Aki basho, Tokyo	November Kyūshū basho, Fukuoka
1992	x	Makushita tsukedashi #60; 6–1	East Makushita #32; 6–1	East Makushita #13; 5–2	East Makushita #8; 6–1–PPP; Champion	West Jūryō #13; 10–5
1993	East Jūryō #7; 9–6	East Jūryō #2; 9–6	East Jūryō #1; 8–7	East Maegashira #16; 9–6	East Maegashira #10; 9–6; T	West Maegashira #2; 8–7; T
1994	East Komusubi #1; 4–11	East Maegashira #5; 6–9	West Maegashira #8; 8–7	West Maegashira #2; 6–9	East Maegashira #4; 4–11	West Maegashira #11; 9–6
1995	West Maegashira #5; 6–9	East Maegashira #7; 5–10	West Maegashira #13; 7–8	East Maegashira #16; Sat out due to injury 0–0–15	West Maegashira #15; 9–6	East Maegashira #11; 7–8
1996	West Maegashira #14; 7–8	East Jūryō #1; 1–1–13	West Jūryō #12; Sat out due to injury 0–0–15	West Jūryō #12; 9–6	East Jūryō #7; 8–7	East Jūryō #5; 6–9
1997	East Jūryō #8; 8–7	West Jūryō #5; 6–9	East Jūryō #8; 8–5–2	East Jūryō #6; 8–7	East Jūryō #3; 5–7–3	East Jūryō #7; Sat out due to injury 0–0–15
1998	East Jūryō #7; 6–9	East Jūryō #11; 9–6	West Jūryō #6; 6–9	East Jūryō #12; 9–6	East Jūryō #9; 9–6	East Jūryō #4; 8–7
1999	West Jūryō #2; 5–10	West Jūryō #6; 8–7	East Jūryō #5; 6–9	West Jūryō #8; 10–5–PP	West Jūryō #3; 6–9	East Jūryō #6; 7–8
2000	East Jūryō #9; 9–6	East Jūryō #5; 6–9	East Jūryō #8; 7–8	East Jūryō #9; 6–9	East Jūryō #11; 6–9	West Jūryō #13; 8–7
2001	East Jūryō #9; 7–8	East Jūryō #10; 6–9	West Jūryō #12; Sat out due to injury 0–0–15	West Jūryō #12; 8–7	East Jūryō #11; 5–10	West Makushita #3; Retired –
Record given as wins–losses–absences Top division champion Top division runner-up Retired Lower divisions Non-participation Sanshō key: F=Fighting spirit; O=Outstanding performance; T=Technique Also shown: ★=Kinboshi; P=Playoff(s); Divisions: Makuuchi — Jūryō — Makushita — Sandanme — Jonidan — Jonokuchi Makuuchi ranks: Yokozuna — Ōzeki — Sekiwake — Komusubi — Maegashira

== See also ==
- Glossary of sumo terms
- List of past sumo wrestlers
- List of sumo elders
- List of komusubi
