= Toyonoumi Shinji =

Japanese sumo wrestler (1965–2021)

Personal information
- Native name: 豊ノ海 真二
- Born: Shinji Hamada; 22 September 1965 Buzen, Fukuoka, Japan
- Died: 20 November 2021 (aged 56)
- Height: 1.89 m (6 ft 2 in)
- Weight: 219 kg (483 lb)

Sport
- Sport: Sumo
- Retired: March 1999
- Heya: Futagoyama → Fujishima → Futagoyama
- Record: 655-661-0
- Debut: March 1981
- Highest rank: Maegashira 1 (September 1992)
- Elder name: Yamahibiki
- Championships: 2 (Jūryō); 1 (Makushita)
- Updated on Sep. 2012

Shinji Hamada (22 September 1965 – 20 November 2021), better known as Toyonoumi Shinji, was a Japanese sumo wrestler from Buzen, Fukuoka. He made his professional debut in March 1981 and reached the top division in November 1988. He was known by the shikona Takanohama until 1990. His highest rank was maegashira 1. He did not miss a single bout in his 19-year professional career. Upon retirement from active competition he became an elder in the Japan Sumo Association, under the name Yamahibiki. He left the Sumo Association in June 2002.

== Career ==
Born Shinji Hamada in Buzen, Fukuoka, he was first spotted while at elementary school by ozeki Takanohana Kenshi, who was on a regional tour, and the youngster was promised a spot in Futagoyama stable. After graduating from junior high in March 1981, he made his professional debut alongside future sekiwake Tochitsukasa. In March 1982 he followed the now retired Takanohana to a new stable the former ozeki had founded, Fujishima. Having previously fought under his own surname of Hamada, to mark the occasion his shikona was modified to Takanohama. He rose steadily up the ranks, reaching the elite sekitori level in September 1987 when he was promoted to the juryo division. In November 1988 having won the juryo yusho or tournament championship he made his debut in the top makuuchi division alongside Saganobori. These two were the final new makuuchi wrestlers of the Shōwa era. He fell back to juryo in July 1989 but immediately returned. In July 1990 he switched to the shikona of Toyonoumi, which he was to use for the rest of his career. In January 1992 he took a second juryo division championship – in the same tournament that his stablemate Takahanada (the son of his stablemaster) won the makuuchi division title. In February 1993 he found himself back under the Futagoyama banner when his original stable and Fujishima merged following the retirement of Futagoyama Oyakata (former yokozuna Wakanohana Kanji I).

Despite fighting in the top division for a total of thirty tournaments, Toyonoumi never won a special prize or managed to defeat a yokozuna. He never reached a sanyaku position, his highest rank being maegashira 1 which he achieved in September 1992. His last appearance in the top division was in March 1994 but he carried on fighting for another five years after that, finally announcing his retirement in March 1999 facing certain demotion to the unsalaried makushita division. He had been an active wrestler for 19 years and had never missed a bout in his entire career, fighting 1316 consecutive matches – the eighth highest in sumo history.

== Retirement from sumo ==
Toyonoumi's danpatsu-shiki or official retirement ceremony was held on 3 October 1999 at the Ryogoku Kokugikan, with around 3000 guests. He remained in the sumo world as a coach at his stable under the elder name of Yamahibiki Oyakata, but he was only renting the elder stock and he left the Japan Sumo Association in June 2002. The Sumo Association announced that he had died of an unspecified illness on 20 November 2021, aged 56.

== Fighting style ==
Toyonoumi was one of the heaviest wrestlers ever, reaching a peak weight of around 225 kg (496 lb) in 1998, and was sometimes criticised for being ungainly and slow-moving. He favoured yotsu-sumo or grappling techniques. He used a hidari-yotsu position on his opponent's mawashi or belt, with a right hand outside, left hand inside grip. His two most common winning kimarite were yori-kiri (force out) and oshi-dashi (push out). Among other techniques he used regularly were kotenage (armlock throw) and kimedashi (arm barring force out).

== Career record ==
Toyonoumi Shinji
Year	January Hatsu basho, Tokyo	March Haru basho, Osaka	May Natsu basho, Tokyo	July Nagoya basho, Nagoya	September Aki basho, Tokyo	November Kyūshū basho, Fukuoka
1981	x	(Maezumo)	East Jonokuchi #31; 2–5	East Jonokuchi #11; 4–3	West Jonidan #131; 3–4	West Jonidan #138; 6–1
1982	West Jonidan #71; 1–6	West Jonidan #107; 4–3	East Jonidan #90; 6–1	East Jonidan #21; 2–5	West Jonidan #49; 4–3	East Jonidan #27; 5–2
1983	West Sandanme #79; 4–3	East Sandanme #62; 3–4	East Sandanme #76; 5–2	East Sandanme #45; 3–4	East Sandanme #62; 3–4	West Sandanme #79; 5–2
1984	East Sandanme #45; 5–2	East Sandanme #14; 3–4	West Sandanme #29; 4–3	East Sandanme #13; 4–3	West Sandanme #1; 3–4	West Sandanme #14; 5–2
1985	West Makushita #45; 4–3	East Makushita #32; 4–3	West Makushita #20; 4–3	West Makushita #14; 2–5	West Makushita #30; 2–5	East Makushita #56; 5–2
1986	West Makushita #34; 2–5	West Makushita #58; 5–2	East Makushita #36; 7–0; Champion	East Makushita #3; 3–4	East Makushita #7; 4–3	West Makushita #3; 3–4
1987	East Makushita #6; 4–3	East Makushita #3; 4–3	West Makushita #1; 4–3	East Makushita #1; 4–3	West Jūryō #12; 7–8	East Jūryō #13; 11–4
1988	East Jūryō #6; 8–7	West Jūryō #3; 8–7	East Jūryō #2; 8–7	West Jūryō #1; 6–9	East Jūryō #5; 11–4; Champion	West Maegashira #13; 7–8
1989	East Maegashira #14; 9–6	East Maegashira #8; 5–10	East Maegashira #13; 4–11	East Jūryō #5; 11–4	West Maegashira #14; 9–6	East Maegashira #8; 6–9
1990	East Maegashira #11; 7–8	West Maegashira #13; 7–8	West Maegashira #13; 8–7	East Maegashira #10; 9–6	West Maegashira #3; 3–12	East Maegashira #13; 6–9
1991	West Jūryō #3; 10–5	East Maegashira #15; 10–5	East Maegashira #8; 6–9	West Maegashira #12; 6–9	East Maegashira #14; 7–8	West Maegashira #15; 7–8
1992	East Jūryō #2; 12–3; Champion	West Maegashira #10; 9–6	West Maegashira #5; 8–7	West Maegashira #4; 8–7	West Maegashira #1; 5–10	East Maegashira #7; 9–6
1993	West Maegashira #4; 7–8	West Maegashira #6; 8–7	West Maegashira #3; 5–10	East Maegashira #9; 7–8	West Maegashira #11; 7–8	West Maegashira #14; 8–7
1994	West Maegashira #11; 6–9	West Maegashira #14; 6–9	East Jūryō #1; 7–8	East Jūryō #3; 4–11	West Jūryō #11; 8–7	East Jūryō #8; 8–7
1995	East Jūryō #7; 8–7	East Jūryō #6; 9–6	East Jūryō #2; 9–6	West Jūryō #1; 5–10	West Jūryō #5; 8–7	West Jūryō #3; 6–9
1996	West Jūryō #5; 6–9	East Jūryō #11; 9–6	West Jūryō #6; 9–6	East Jūryō #2; 3–12	East Jūryō #11; 9–6	East Jūryō #6; 5–10
1997	East Jūryō #11; 8–7	East Jūryō #8; 6–9	East Jūryō #11; 9–6	West Jūryō #6; 6–9	West Jūryō #9; 8–7	West Jūryō #5; 8–7
1998	West Jūryō #3; 5–10	East Jūryō #8; 6–9	West Jūryō #10; 9–6	West Jūryō #5; 8–7	West Jūryō #3; 6–9	East Jūryō #8; 8–7
1999	West Jūryō #6; 7–8	East Jūryō #8; Retired; 2–13	x	x	x	x
Record given as wins–losses–absences Top division champion Top division runner-up Retired Lower divisions Non-participation Sanshō key: F=Fighting spirit; O=Outstanding performance; T=Technique Also shown: ★=Kinboshi; P=Playoff(s); Divisions: Makuuchi — Jūryō — Makushita — Sandanme — Jonidan — Jonokuchi Makuuchi ranks: Yokozuna — Ōzeki — Sekiwake — Komusubi — Maegashira

== See also ==
- Glossary of sumo terms
- List of sumo record holders
- List of past sumo wrestlers
- List of sumo tournament second division champions
