= Daishōhō =

Daishōhō may refer to:

- Daishōhō Masami (1967–1999), Japanese sumo wrestler
- Daishōhō Kiyohiro (born 1994), Mongolian sumo wrestler
