= Daishōyama Naoki =

Japanese sumo wrestler

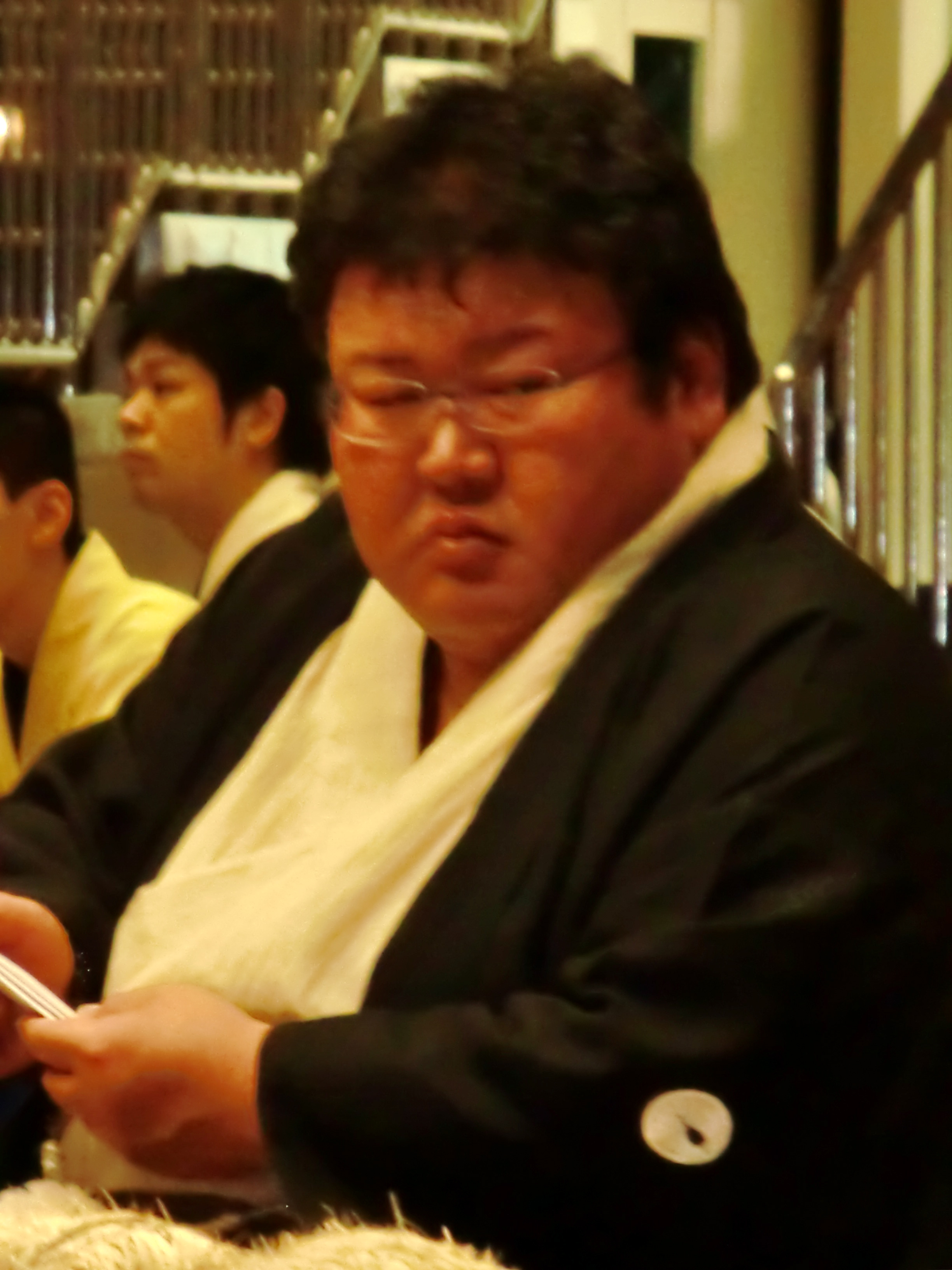

Personal information
- Born: Naoki Yamazaki; 7 July 1966 (age 60) Anamizu, Ishikawa, Japan
- Height: 1.82 m (5 ft 11 1/2 in)
- Weight: 179 kg (395 lb; 28.2 st)

Sport
- Sport: Sumo
- University team: Nihon University
- Retired: November 1995
- Heya: Tatsunami
- Record: 266-252-40
- Debut: January, 1989
- Highest rank: Maegashira 2 (January, 1991)
- Elder name: Oitekaze
- Championships: 1 (Jūryō); 2 (Makushita)
- Special Prizes: Fighting Spirit (1)
- Gold Stars: 3 Hokutoumi (2); Ōnokuni
- Updated on March 2009

Daishōyama Naoki (born 7 July 1966 as Naoki Yamazaki) is a former sumo wrestler from Anamizu, Ishikawa, Japan. A former amateur champion, he made his professional debut in January 1989 and reached a highest rank of maegashira 2 before retiring in 1995. He is now the head coach of Oitekaze stable.

== Career ==
Born in Anamizu, Hosu District, as an amateur he won eleven sumo titles, including collegiate and amateur yokozuna, while studying at Nihon University. He also served as captain of the school sumo team. He was recruited by the former sekiwake Annenyama of the Tatsunami stable. Yamazaki had stayed at the heya while taking part in junior high school competitions (as did Daishōhō), and he had also met the former Tatsunami stable wrestler Wakanami as an infant, being held in his arms for a photograph (as top rikishi are often requested to do for luck). As an amateur champion he was given makushita tsukedashi status and made his debut in the third highest makushita division. His first tournament was in January 1989 and after two consecutive yūshō with perfect 7-0 records in January and March 1990 he was promoted to the second highest jūryō division, becoming the first sekitori from Tatsunami stable since the abrupt departure of yokozuna Futahaguro in 1987. He changed his shikona or fighting name from his own surname to Daishōyama at this point.

Daishōyama made his debut in the top makuuchi division in September 1990, and made a kachi-koshi winning score along with three other makuuchi debutants, Akebono, Wakahanada and Takatoriki. This marked the first time that four wrestlers making their top division debuts at the same time had all come through with winning records. In January 1991 he reached what was to be his highest rank of maegashira 2 and earned his first kinboshi for defeating yokozuna Hokutoumi. He was to repeat this upset in July 1991 and also defeated yokozuna Ōnokuni in that tournament. In January 1993 he had slipped to maegashira 14 in the banzuke rankings but responded with his best ever top division score, winning twelve bouts, defeating Konishiki and Takahanada amongst others and finishing runner-up to Akebono, who was promoted to yokozuna after the tournament. Daishōyama was rewarded with what was to be his only sanshō award, for Fighting Spirit.

Daishōyama had had longstanding hip problems since his professional debut, and after missing two tournaments in 1994 through injury he fell back to the jūryō division. After being forced to sit out the September 1995 tournament as well he was demoted to the makushita division and retired from sumo in November without competing in any more bouts.

== Retirement from sumo ==
Having fought in 33 tournaments as a sekitori, Daishōyama was qualified to become a toshiyori, or elder of the Japan Sumo Association, and he acquired the Oitekaze name, having married the daughter of the previous Oitekaze (former maegashira Oiteyama). Initially a coach at Tatsunami stable, in 1997 he moved to Tomozuna stable. In October 1998 he left Tomozuna to branch out and open up his own Oitekaze stable. His first top division wrestler was Hayateumi in 2000 and he was followed by Hamanishiki in 2001. Both are former Nihon University competitors. He also recruited the Georgian wrestler Kokkai who reached makuuchi in 2004. More recent Nihon University recruits include the popular Endō in 2013, Daishōmaru and Tsurugisho in 2014, Tobizaru in 2015 and Daiamami in 2016, all of whom have reached the top division. He produced another top division wrestler Daieishō in 2015, who has a non-collegiate background, and won a yūshō in January 2021.

== Career record ==
Daishōyama Naoki
Year	January Hatsu basho, Tokyo	March Haru basho, Osaka	May Natsu basho, Tokyo	July Nagoya basho, Nagoya	September Aki basho, Tokyo	November Kyūshū basho, Fukuoka
1989	Makushita tsukedashi #60; 6–1	East Makushita #32; 4–3	East Makushita #23; 5–2	West Makushita #11; 4–3	West Makushita #8; 1–6	West Makushita #30; 4–1–2
1990	East Makushita #24; 7–0; Champion	East Makushita #4; 7–0; Champion	West Jūryō #11; 12–3; Champion	West Jūryō #2; 11–4	East Maegashira #12; 8–7	West Maegashira #8; 9–6
1991	West Maegashira #2; 5–10 ★	West Maegashira #8; 8–7	East Maegashira #4; 8–7	East Maegashira #2; 5–10 ★★	East Maegashira #9; 8–7	East Maegashira #7; 9–6
1992	West Maegashira #2; 5–10	East Maegashira #8; 9–6	East Maegashira #3; 6–9	East Maegashira #6; 8–7	West Maegashira #2; 5–10	West Maegashira #8; 5–10
1993	West Maegashira #14; 12–3; F	East Maegashira #3; 3–12	East Maegashira #12; 9–6	East Maegashira #6; 5–10	West Maegashira #12; 8–7	East Maegashira #10; 6–9
1994	East Maegashira #15; 9–6	West Maegashira #10; 3–11–1	East Jūryō #4; Sat out due to injury 0–0–15	East Jūryō #4; 5–10	West Jūryō #9; 9–6	West Jūryō #4; 7–8
1995	West Jūryō #6; 6–9	East Jūryō #11; 9–6	West Jūryō #7; 7–8	West Jūryō #8; 9–6	East Jūryō #4; Sat out due to injury 0–0–15	West Makushita #3; Retired; 0–0–7
Record given as wins–losses–absences Top division champion Top division runner-up Retired Lower divisions Non-participation Sanshō key: F=Fighting spirit; O=Outstanding performance; T=Technique Also shown: ★=Kinboshi; P=Playoff(s); Divisions: Makuuchi — Jūryō — Makushita — Sandanme — Jonidan — Jonokuchi Makuuchi ranks: Yokozuna — Ōzeki — Sekiwake — Komusubi — Maegashira

== See also ==
- List of sumo tournament top division runners-up
- List of sumo tournament second division champions
- Glossary of sumo terms
- List of past sumo wrestlers
- List of sumo elders
