= Tomoefuji Toshihide =

Former Japanese sumo wrestler

Personal information
- Native name: 巴富士 俊英
- Born: Toshihide Kurosawa; 27 January 1971 (age 55) Kazuno, Akita
- Height: 1.91 m (6 ft 3 in)
- Weight: 142 kg (313 lb; 22.4 st)

Sport
- Sport: Sumo
- Retired: September, 1998
- Heya: Kokonoe
- Record: 354-307-97
- Debut: May, 1986
- Highest rank: Komusubi (July, 1992)
- Championships: 1 (Jonidan)
- Special Prizes: Fighting Spirit (1)
- Updated on February 2009

Tomoefuji Toshihide (born 27 January 1971 as Toshihide Kurosawa) is a former sumo wrestler from Akita Prefecture, Japan. His highest rank was komusubi.

== Career ==
Born in Kazuno, he was scouted by yokozuna Chiyonofuji after winning several children's sumo competitions in his native Akita Prefecture. In junior high school he was a rival of Wakanohana. He joined Chiyonofuji's Kokonoe stable and made his professional debut in May 1986. He made the sandanme division in November 1987 but then missed two tournaments and fell back to the lowest jonokuchi division. In July 1988 he won his first (and only) yusho or tournament championship in the jonidan division with a perfect 7–0 record. He reached the third highest makushita division a year later.

While in the makushita division he performed the yumitori-shiki or bow-twirling ceremony that takes place at the end of every tournament day, from 1989 to 1990. He reached sekitori status in July 1990 upon promotion to the jūryō division and in January 1991 made his debut in the makuuchi top division. He scored ten wins in his debut and was awarded the Fighting Spirit sansho or special prize. Tomoefuji seemed to have broken the jinx against performers of the yumitori-shiki ceremony having a successful career in sumo.

In May 1992 he became the only sekitori in his stable, following the retirements of Hokutoumi and Takanofuji. Just a year earlier the stable had had two yokozuna, Hokutoumi and Chiyonofuji. Tomoefuji's subsequent career was blighted by injuries. He was involved in a training accident with Akebono shortly before the July 1992 tournament, which led to Akebono having to miss his debut tournament as ozeki. Tomoefuji made his debut in the sanyaku ranks at komusubi in that tournament, but had to pull out on the second day. He never managed to return to the rank. Restricted by an injury to his right knee, in September 1993 he was demoted back to the jūryō division after a poor 4–11 record. He missed two tournaments in 1994, falling to the bottom of the division, and in May 1995 he lost sekitori status altogether after falling back to makushita. He fought his last competitive match in March 1998. He was still listed on the banzuke ranking sheets in September but had fallen to sandanme 85, the lowest rank ever recorded by a former sanyaku wrestler, upon which he announced his retirement from sumo. He left the Sumo Association upon retiring.

== Fighting style ==
Tomoefuji's favourite techniques were hidari-yotsu, (a right hand outside, left hand inside grip on his opponents' mawashi) uwatenage, (overarm throw) and yorikiri (force out).

== Career record ==
Tomoefuji Toshihide
Year	January Hatsu basho, Tokyo	March Haru basho, Osaka	May Natsu basho, Tokyo	July Nagoya basho, Nagoya	September Aki basho, Tokyo	November Kyūshū basho, Fukuoka
1986	x	x	(Maezumō)	East Jonokuchi #57; 6–1	West Jonidan #121; 6–1	West Jonidan #47; 2–5
1987	West Jonidan #72; 5–2	West Jonidan #31; 2–2–3	East Jonidan #66; 2–5	West Jonidan #93; 6–1	West Jonidan #25; 5–2	West Sandanme #91; 1–6
1988	West Jonidan #23; Sat out due to injury 0–0–7	East Jonidan #94; Sat out due to injury 0–0–7	West Jonokuchi #7; 6–1	West Jonidan #87; 7–0–P; Champion	East Sandanme #80; 4–3	East Sandanme #57; 5–2
1989	East Sandanme #27; 3–4	East Sandanme #41; 5–2	West Sandanme #11; 6–1	East Makushita #39; 6–1	East Makushita #18; 5–2	West Makushita #8; 2–5
1990	West Makushita #21; 5–2	East Makushita #10; 5–2	East Makushita #5; 6–1–P	West Jūryō #12; 8–7	East Jūryō #9; 9–6	East Jūryō #4; 8–7
1991	West Maegashira #15; 10–5; F	West Maegashira #6; 5–10	West Maegashira #13; 8–7	West Maegashira #9; 9–6	East Maegashira #4; 0–2–13	East Maegashira #16; 9–6
1992	East Maegashira #12; 8–7	West Maegashira #6; 9–6	West Maegashira #1; 8–7	West Komusubi #2; 0–2–13	East Maegashira #13; 9–6	West Maegashira #6; 10–5
1993	East Maegashira #2; 6–9	West Maegashira #4; 9–6	West Maegashira #1; 3–12	East Maegashira #8; 5–10	West Maegashira #13; 4–11	West Jūryō #5; 6–9
1994	East Jūryō #8; 7–8	West Jūryō #9; 8–7	West Jūryō #7; 9–6	West Jūryō #3; 10–5	East Jūryō #1; 0–3–12	West Jūryō #12; Sat out due to injury 0–0–15
1995	West Jūryō #12; 11–4–P	East Jūryō #5; 6–9	West Jūryō #8; 4–11	West Makushita #1; 1–6	West Makushita #20; Sat out due to injury 0–0–7	West Makushita #59; 4–3
1996	East Makushita #48; 5–2	West Makushita #28; 4–3	West Makushita #20; 5–2	West Makushita #10; 5–2	West Makushita #4; 2–5	East Makushita #13; 5–2
1997	East Makushita #5; 3–4	West Makushita #12; 3–4	West Makushita #19; 4–3	West Makushita #12; 3–4	West Makushita #19; 5–2	West Makushita #11; 4–3
1998	West Makushita #6; 2–5	East Makushita #21; 1–6	East Makushita #46; 0–1–6	West Sandanme #25; Sat out due to injury 0–0–7	East Sandanme #85; Retired –	x
Record given as wins–losses–absences Top division champion Top division runner-up Retired Non-participation Jūryō Lower divisions Sanshō key: F=Fighting spirit; O=Outstanding performance; T=Technique Also shown: ★=Kinboshi; P=Playoff(s); Divisions: Makuuchi — Jūryō — Makushita — Sandanme — Jonidan — Jonokuchi Makuuchi ranks: Yokozuna — Ōzeki — Sekiwake — Komusubi — Maegashira

== See also ==
- Glossary of sumo terms
- List of past sumo wrestlers
- List of komusubi
