= Ryōgoku Kajinosuke =

Ryōgoku Kajinosuke may refer to:

- Ryōgoku Kajinosuke I (1874–1949), sumo wrestler, komusubi
- Ryōgoku Kajinosuke II (1892–1960), sumo wrestler, sekiwake
- Ryōgoku Kajinosuke III (1907–1959), sumo wrestler, sekiwake
- Ryōgoku Kajinosuke IV (born 1962), sumo wrestler, komusubi
