= Kotogaume Tsuyoshi =

Japanese sumo wrestler

Personal information
- Native name: 琴ヶ梅 剛史
- Born: Satoru Kitayama; 5 October 1963 (age 63) Toyama, Japan
- Height: 1.80 m (5 ft 11 in)
- Weight: 183 kg (403 lb)

Sport
- Sport: Sumo
- Retired: May, 1997
- Heya: Sadogatake
- Record: 691-663-37
- Debut: March, 1979
- Highest rank: Sekiwake (September, 1986)
- Elder name: See retirement
- Championships: 1 (Jūryō); 2 (Sandanme)
- Special Prizes: Technique (2); Outstanding Performance (1); Fighting Spirit (4)
- Gold Stars: 2 (Hokutoumi, Ōnokuni)
- Updated on June 2020

Kotogaume Tsuyoshi (born 5 October 1963 as Satoru Kitayama) is a former sumo wrestler from Yatsuo, Nei District, Toyama Prefecture, Japan. He joined sumo in 1979 and made the top makuuchi division in 1985. His highest rank was sekiwake, which he held on twelve occasions. After his retirement in 1997 he worked as a coach at Sadogatake stable until 2007.

== Career ==
In his youth he practiced judo and was a black belt, 1st dan. He made his professional sumo debut in March 1979, after finishing junior high school. Initially he fought under his own surname of Kitayama, before being given the shikona of Kotogaume ("Harp of the Plum"). In his early career he served as a tsukebito or personal attendant to ozeki Kotokaze. He made his first appearance in the titled sanyaku ranks of the top division in November 1985, the same tournament in which Kotokaze announced his retirement. He reached his highest rank of sekiwake for the first time in September 1986. In 1989 he came close to ozeki promotion by producing two double figure scores at sekiwake in July and September, but he fell short with only eight wins in November 1989. In his later career he suffered increasingly from diabetes and fell to the second jūryō division. He made his last appearance in makuuchi in January 1995 and retired in May 1997.

Kotogaume earned two gold stars for defeating yokozuna whilst ranked as a maegashira, and at sekiwake in May 1988 he was also the last man to defeat Chiyonofuji before the latter embarked on his 53 bout winning streak. He also received seven special prizes. His best result in a tournament was third place in January 1988, behind Asahifuji and Konishiki.

== Retirement from sumo ==
Kotogaume became an elder of the Sumo Association upon his retirement, but he did not own permanent toshiyori elder stock and had to borrow from wrestlers still active. He used Terao's Shikoroyama name until 2002, and then switched to Dejima's Onaruto name, but had to leave the Sumo Association in November 2007 when it was needed by the retiring Buyuzan, a member of Dejima's stable.

After leaving sumo, he opened up a chankonabe restaurant in Tokyo, named Kotogaume. He has also worked as an assistant instructor at Shikoroyama stable.

== Fighting style ==
Kotogaume throughout his career relied almost entirely on pushing and thrusting techniques, and seemed to have little interest in using his opponent's mawashi for throws. Oshi-dashi, a straightforward push out, was the kimarite used in exactly half of his victories at sekitori level.

== Career record ==
Kotogaume Tsuyoshi
Year	January Hatsu basho, Tokyo	March Haru basho, Osaka	May Natsu basho, Tokyo	July Nagoya basho, Nagoya	September Aki basho, Tokyo	November Kyūshū basho, Fukuoka
1979	x	(Maezumo)	East Jonokuchi #6; 4–3	East Jonidan #88; 3–4	East Jonidan #103; 4–3	East Jonidan #81; 4–3
1980	East Jonidan #56; 4–3	East Jonidan #33; 3–4	West Jonidan #52; 4–3	West Jonidan #33; 3–4	East Jonidan #49; 4–3	West Jonidan #20; 4–3
1981	West Jonidan #1; 5–2	East Sandanme #61; 3–4	West Sandanme #72; 3–4	West Sandanme #84; 4–3	West Sandanme #73; 7–0–P; Champion	East Makushita #58; 2–5
1982	West Sandanme #18; 7–0; Champion	West Makushita #23; 5–2	East Makushita #12; 2–5	East Makushita #29; 2–5	West Makushita #51; 4–3	East Makushita #42; 3–4
1983	West Makushita #52; 6–1	East Makushita #23; 4–3	East Makushita #17; 3–4	West Makushita #24; 4–3	West Makushita #19; 4–3	East Makushita #14; 6–1
1984	East Makushita #2; 5–2	West Jūryō #11; 7–8	West Jūryō #13; 6–9	West Makushita #2; 5–2	West Jūryō #13; 10–5	East Jūryō #7; 10–5
1985	East Jūryō #3; 11–4	West Maegashira #12; 8–7	East Maegashira #9; 7–8	East Maegashira #11; 8–7	West Maegashira #7; 9–6; F	West Komusubi #1; 7–8
1986	East Maegashira #1; 9–6; F	West Komusubi #1; 6–9	East Maegashira #2; 8–7	East Komusubi #1; 9–6; T	East Sekiwake #1; 8–7	East Sekiwake #1; 6–9
1987	West Maegashira #1; 0–3–12	West Maegashira #13; 8–7	East Maegashira #11; 8–7	West Maegashira #5; 6–9	West Maegashira #10; 9–6	East Maegashira #3; 5–10
1988	East Maegashira #7; 12–3; F★	East Komusubi #1; 8–7	West Sekiwake #1; 8–7; O	West Sekiwake #1; 8–7	West Sekiwake #1; 8–7	West Sekiwake #1; 5–10
1989	East Maegashira #3; 8–7 ★	East Komusubi #1; 8–7	East Sekiwake #1; 8–7	East Sekiwake #1; 10–5; F	East Sekiwake #1; 10–5; T	East Sekiwake #1; 8–7
1990	West Sekiwake #1; 8–7	West Sekiwake #1; 7–8	West Komusubi #1; 4–11	East Maegashira #7; 8–7	East Maegashira #3; 7–8	West Maegashira #4; 7–8
1991	West Maegashira #5; 7–8	East Maegashira #7; 8–7	East Maegashira #3; 8–7	West Maegashira #1; 6–9	West Maegashira #5; 5–10	East Maegashira #10; 8–7
1992	West Maegashira #8; 5–10	East Maegashira #14; 3–12	East Jūryō #6; 11–4; Champion	East Maegashira #15; 8–7	West Maegashira #10; 6–9	East Maegashira #13; 7–8
1993	East Maegashira #15; 2–3–10	West Jūryō #8; Sat out due to injury 0–0–15	West Jūryō #8; 8–7	East Jūryō #7; 9–6	East Jūryō #6; 8–7	East Jūryō #4; 8–7
1994	West Jūryō #3; 10–5	West Maegashira #15; 8–7	West Maegashira #13; 8–7	West Maegashira #11; 7–8	East Maegashira #14; 5–10	East Jūryō #2; 9–6
1995	East Maegashira #16; 5–10	West Jūryō #3; 6–9	East Jūryō #7; 8–7	West Jūryō #5; 8–7	West Jūryō #3; 6–9	East Jūryō #7; 9–6
1996	West Jūryō #4; 6–9	East Jūryō #9; 6–9	West Jūryō #11; 8–7	West Jūryō #10; 6–9	West Jūryō #13; 9–6	West Jūryō #10; 8–7
1997	West Jūryō #5; 5–10	West Jūryō #10; 7–8	West Jūryō #11; Retired; 2–9	x	x	x
Record given as wins–losses–absences Top division champion Top division runner-up Retired Lower divisions Non-participation Sanshō key: F=Fighting spirit; O=Outstanding performance; T=Technique Also shown: ★=Kinboshi; P=Playoff(s); Divisions: Makuuchi — Jūryō — Makushita — Sandanme — Jonidan — Jonokuchi Makuuchi ranks: Yokozuna — Ōzeki — Sekiwake — Komusubi — Maegashira

== See also ==
- Glossary of sumo terms
- List of sumo tournament second division champions
- List of past sumo wrestlers
- List of sekiwake
