= Hananokuni Akihiro =

Japanese sumo wrestler

Personal information
- Native name: 花ノ国 明宏
- Born: Akihiro Noguchi; 15 October 1959 (age 67) Fujiidera, Osaka, Japan
- Height: 1.85 m (6 ft 1 in)
- Weight: 146 kg (322 lb)

Sport
- Sport: Sumo
- Retired: November, 1994
- Heya: Hanakago → Hanaregoma
- Record: 605-593-21
- Debut: March, 1975
- Highest rank: Maegashira 1 (November, 1989)
- Championships: 1 (Makushita)
- Special Prizes: Fighting Spirit (1)
- Gold Stars: 1 (Hokutoumi)
- Updated on Sep. 2012

Hananokuni Akihiro (born 15 October 1959 as Akihiro Noguchi) is a former sumo wrestler from Fujiidera, Osaka, Japan.

== Career ==
He made his professional debut in March 1975, joining Hanakago stable. He joined Hanaregoma stable when Hanakago was wound up in 1985. After many years in the lower ranks he finally reached the makuuchi or top division in March 1988 at the age of 28. His best result in a tournament came in September 1988 when he won eleven bouts, defeated ōzeki Konishiki and received the Fighting Spirit Award. He defeated yokozuna Hokutoumi in September 1989 to earn his only kinboshi. Chiyonofuji defeated him in March 1990 to become the first wrestler to win 1000 career bouts. His highest rank was maegashira 1. His last appearance in the top division came in November 1992 and he spent the last two years of his career back in the jūryō and makushita divisions.

== Retirement from sumo ==
Upon his retirement in November 1994 he was unable to obtain elder stock and become a member of the Japan Sumo Association. However, he was able to remain in sumo by becoming a wakaimonogashira, a kind of record keeper and odd job man which is a salaried role within the Sumo Association. He can often be seen assisting with the presentation of prizes to the yūshō winner at the conclusion of tournaments. He is attached to Shibatayama stable.

== Fighting style ==
Hananokuni′s favoured kimarite or techniques included yori taoshi (force out and down), uwatenage (overarm throw) and shitatedashinage (pulling inner arm throw. He used a migi yotsu grip on the mawashi, with his left hand outside and right hand inside his opponent′s arms.

== Career record ==
Hananokuni Akihiro
Year	January Hatsu basho, Tokyo	March Haru basho, Osaka	May Natsu basho, Tokyo	July Nagoya basho, Nagoya	September Aki basho, Tokyo	November Kyūshū basho, Fukuoka
1975	x	(Maezumo)	East Jonokuchi #4; 4–3	East Jonidan #89; 2–5	West Jonidan #109; 5–2	West Jonidan #70; 5–2
1976	West Jonidan #42; 2–5	West Jonidan #64; 2–5	West Jonidan #81; 5–2	East Jonidan #37; 3–4	West Jonidan #54; 6–1	East Sandanme #85; 3–2–2
1977	East Jonidan #10; 2–5	West Jonidan #34; 5–2	East Sandanme #80; 2–5	East Jonidan #13; 5–2	West Sandanme #75; 4–3	East Sandanme #59; 3–4
1978	West Sandanme #69; 5–2	East Sandanme #38; 5–2	West Sandanme #4; 5–2	East Makushita #46; 4–3	East Makushita #36; 4–3	East Makushita #29; 4–3
1979	West Makushita #22; 3–4	West Makushita #29; 2–5	West Makushita #52; 4–3	East Makushita #44; 5–2	East Makushita #24; 4–3	East Makushita #18; 3–4
1980	East Makushita #28; 5–2	East Makushita #18; 4–3	East Makushita #13; 4–3	East Makushita #9; 2–5	West Makushita #23; 3–4	West Makushita #32; 4–3
1981	East Makushita #9; 2–5	West Makushita #23; 3–4	West Makushita #32; 4–3	East Makushita #9; 2–5	West Makushita #23; 3–4	West Makushita #32; 4–3
1982	West Makushita #35; 2–5	East Makushita #54; 5–2	West Makushita #35; 4–3	East Makushita #28; 5–2	East Makushita #15; 5–2	West Makushita #9; 5–2
1983	West Makushita #2; 4–3	West Makushita #1; 5–2	West Jūryō #12; 4–11	East Makushita #8; 4–3	West Makushita #5; 4–3	West Makushita #3; 5–2
1984	West Jūryō #11; 9–6	East Jūryō #6; 8–7	East Jūryō #6; 7–8	East Jūryō #8; 5–10	East Makushita #2; 2–5	West Makushita #16; 3–4
1985	West Makushita #25; 4–3	East Makushita #15; 7–0; Champion	East Jūryō #13; 7–8	West Makushita #1; 4–3	West Jūryō #12; 8–7	East Jūryō #10; 5–10
1986	West Makushita #1; 4–3	East Makushita #1; 1–6	East Makushita #25; 4–3	West Makushita #18; 6–1	East Makushita #5; 4–3	West Makushita #2; 3–4
1987	West Makushita #5; 6–1–P	West Jūryō #12; 9–6	East Jūryō #7; 9–6	East Jūryō #4; 9–6	West Jūryō #1; 8–7	East Jūryō #1; 6–9
1988	West Jūryō #4; 10–5	East Maegashira #14; 9–6	East Maegashira #9; 8–7	West Maegashira #3; 5–10	West Maegashira #9; 11–4; F	West Maegashira #2; 6–9
1989	East Maegashira #5; 8–7	East Maegashira #2; 5–10	East Maegashira #7; 8–7	East Maegashira #3; 7–8	East Maegashira #4; 8–7 ★	East Maegashira #1; 4–11
1990	East Maegashira #7; 8–7	West Maegashira #3; 5–10	East Maegashira #6; 8–7	East Maegashira #2; 4–11	East Maegashira #11; 10–5	East Maegashira #3; 5–10
1991	West Maegashira #8; 8–7	East Maegashira #4; 6–9	East Maegashira #10; 8–7	West Maegashira #6; 1–2–12	East Jūryō #2; 8–7	West Jūryō #1; 7–8
1992	East Jūryō #4; 9–6	West Maegashira #16; 6–9	West Jūryō #3; 9–6	East Maegashira #16; 6–9	East Jūryō #2; 8–7	West Maegashira #15; 5–10
1993	East Jūryō #6; 7–8	East Jūryō #8; 8–7	West Jūryō #6; 8–7	West Jūryō #4; 5–10	West Jūryō #9; 7–8	East Jūryō #12; 8–7
1994	West Jūryō #7; 2–6–7	West Makushita #10; 4–3	East Makushita #5; 4–3	West Makushita #3; 2–5	West Makushita #15; 1–6	Retired –
Record given as wins–losses–absences Top division champion Top division runner-up Retired Lower divisions Non-participation Sanshō key: F=Fighting spirit; O=Outstanding performance; T=Technique Also shown: ★=Kinboshi; P=Playoff(s); Divisions: Makuuchi — Jūryō — Makushita — Sandanme — Jonidan — Jonokuchi Makuuchi ranks: Yokozuna — Ōzeki — Sekiwake — Komusubi — Maegashira

== See also ==
- Glossary of sumo terms
- List of past sumo wrestlers
