= Mainoumi Shūhei =

Sumo wrestler (born 1968)

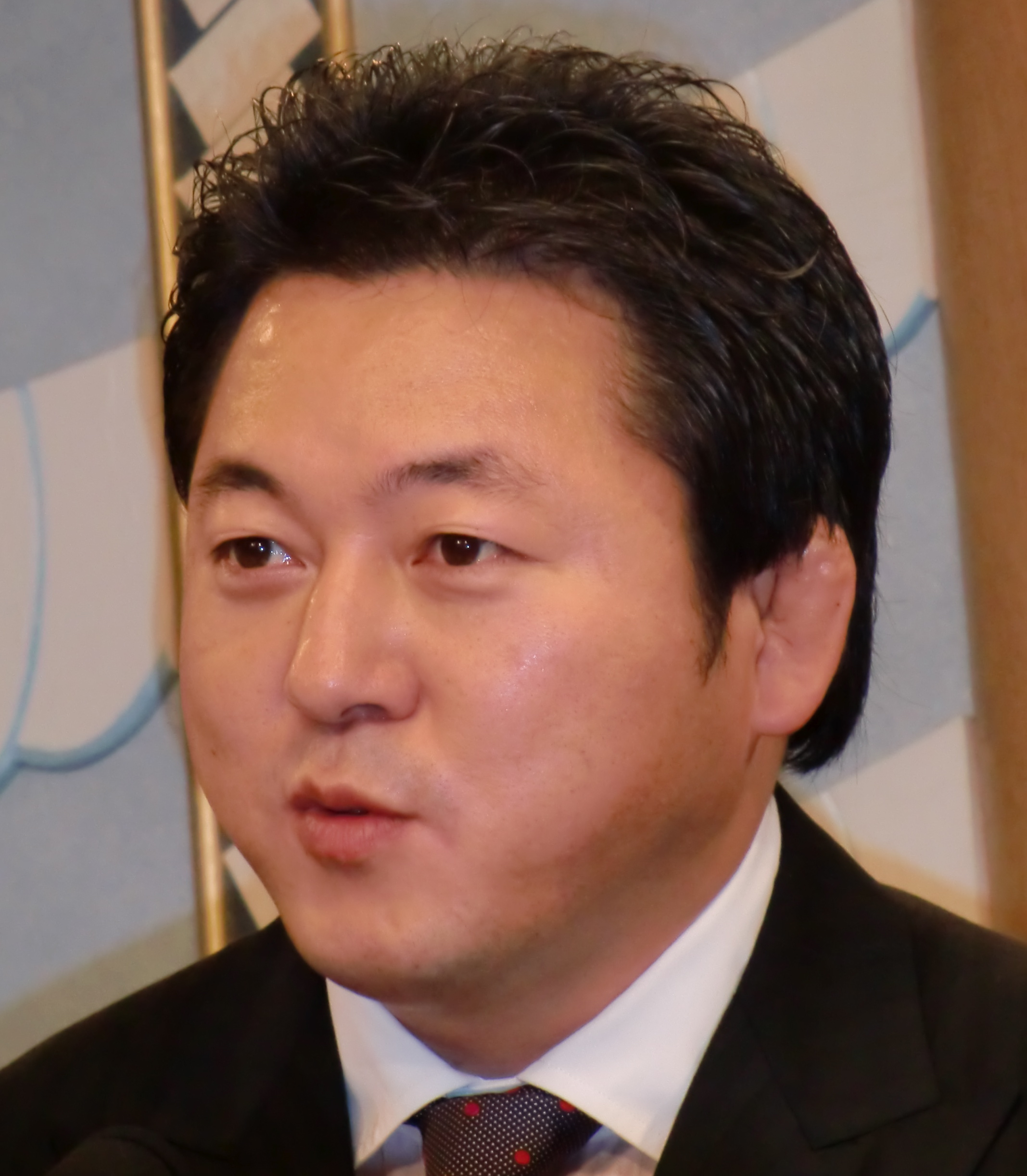

Personal information
- Native name: 舞の海 秀平
- Born: Shūhei Nagao; 17 February 1968 (age 58) Ajigasawa, Aomori, Japan
- Height: 1.71 m (5 ft 7 1/2 in)
- Weight: 98 kg (216 lb)

Sport
- Sport: Sumo
- University team: Nihon University
- Retired: November, 1999
- Heya: Dewanoumi
- Record: 385-418-27
- Debut: May, 1990
- Highest rank: Komusubi (September, 1994)
- Special Prizes: Technique (5)
- Updated on July 2007

Mainoumi Shūhei (born 17 February 1968 as Shūhei Nagao) is a former sumo wrestler from Aomori, Japan. His highest rank was komusubi. During the 1990s, he was one of the most popular wrestlers in sumo due to his wide variety of techniques and great fighting spirit in battling opponents nearly twice his size.

== Career ==
Born in Ajigasawa, Nagao was an amateur sumo champion at Nihon University, where he studied economics. He originally wanted to be a teacher, but decided to join professional sumo in honour of a close friend who died before he could achieve his own ambition of being a sumo champion. Mainoumi initially failed the Sumo Association's physical entrance exam, because he was too short to meet their height requirement, which at that time was 173 cm. He got around this by persuading a doctor to inject silicone into his scalp, giving him the necessary couple of centimetres. To prevent any future hopefuls from having to go through this painful procedure, the Sumo Association changed its rules to allow special dispensation for amateur champions who do not meet the height requirements.

Nagao made his professional debut in May 1990 in the third makushita division and reached jūryō in March 1991. To mark his promotion he changed his shikona from his own surname to Mainoumi (which means "dancing sea"). On his debut in the top makuuchi division in September 1991 he scored eight wins and was awarded the Ginō-shō or Technique Prize, the first of five he was to win during his career.

Mainoumi said his ambition in the top division was to reach a san'yaku rank at least once, and this he achieved in September 1994 when he was promoted to komusubi. In July 1996 he broke his leg when the 275 kg Konishiki fell on it during a bout that Mainoumi won. He was forced to sit out the rest of that tournament and all of the next, dropping to the jūryō division. He returned to the top division in May 1997 but since his injury he had lost some of his speed and he was finding it more difficult to hold his own. In March 1998 he fell back to jūryō once again, where he remained until his retirement from sumo in November 1999.

== Fighting style ==
Mainoumi had such an extensive knowledge of sumo techniques that he was nicknamed Waza no Depaato, or the Department Store of Techniques. He used up to 33 different kimarite during his career. In November 1991 he famously defeated the 204 cm, 200 kg wrestler Akebono by mitokorozeme, a "triple attack force out", which involves simultaneously tripping one leg, grabbing the other, and pushing with the head into the opponent's chest to force him down backwards. Despite appearing to most observers to be mitokorozeme, the win was actually given as uchigake by officials. Mainoumi subsequently won two further bouts that were officially determined as mitokorozeme, against Kotofuji in September 1992 and Tomoefuji in September 1993. He was the only sekitori to have used this technique from the beginning of the Heisei era until November 2019, when it was successfully used by Ishiura. Mainoumi also had a very unusual tachi-ai, and sometimes used the tactic of nekodamashi, of clapping of the hands in front of the opponent's face to distract him at the initial charge. Another tactic was the "Hasso tobi," or "eight-boat leap," which involved a sidestep at the tachi-ai that would see him leave the ground and reappear directly behind his opponent, as happened to Kitakachidoki in January 1992.

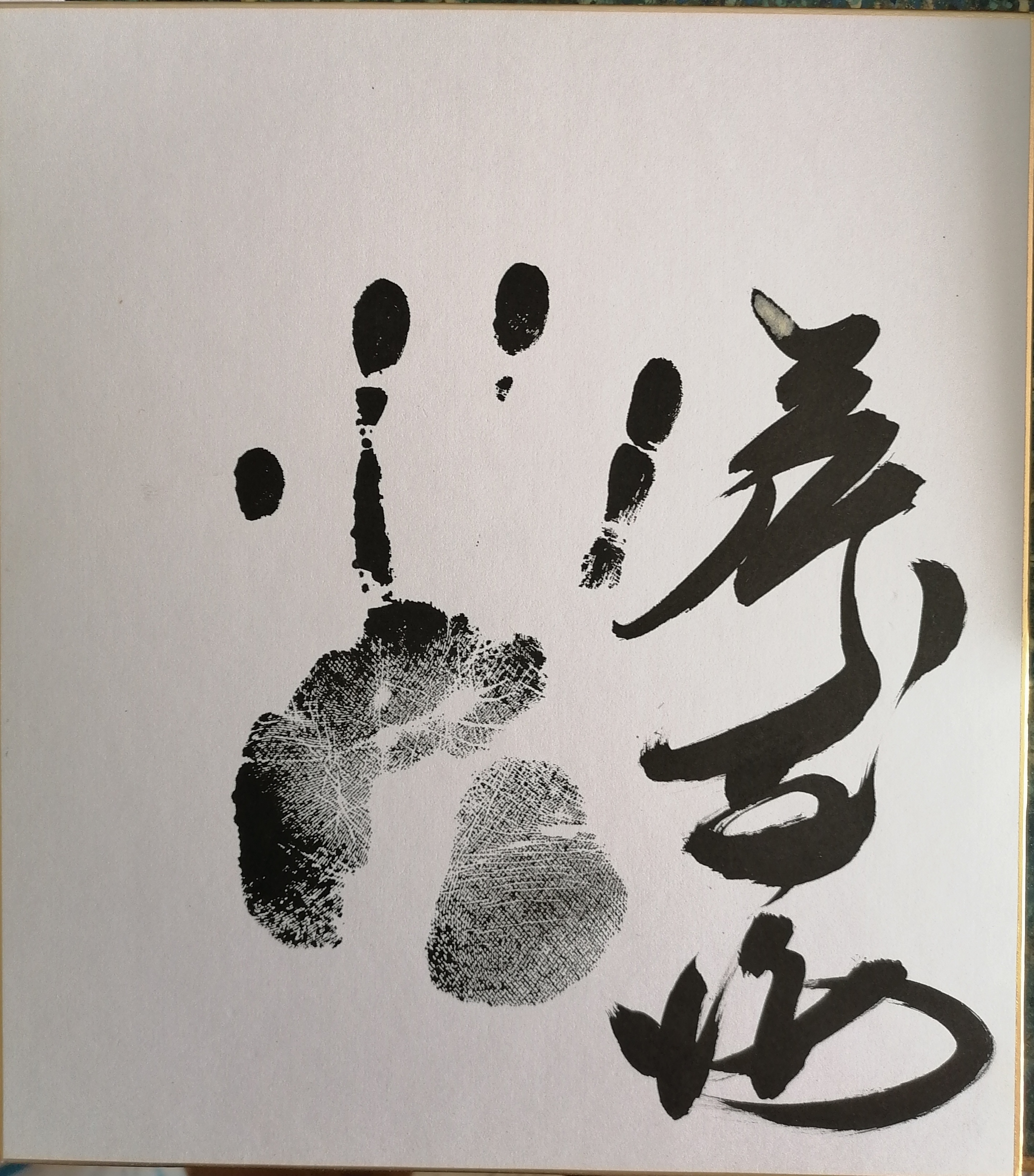
Original tegata (signature and handprint) of sumo wrestler Mainoumi

== Retirement from sumo ==
Mainoumi chose not to stay in sumo as a coach after retiring from the ring, a decision that caused some disquiet in the Sumo Association at a time when the sport's popularity was at a low ebb. Instead he launched a new career as a television personality. He can still be heard commentating on NHK's sumo broadcasts. He has turned down many offers from political parties to run as their candidate. He appeared in 2005 Hollywood film Memoirs of a Geisha as a sumo wrestler, credited as Shūhei Nagao, his real name. He has also worked at Sakaigawa stable (run by his ex-stablemate Ryōgoku) as an assistant instructor. In 2015 he published a book entitled, "Why Can't Japanese Become Yokozuna?" in which he argued that because of their rich lifestyle Japanese youth lacked the "hungry spirit" of Mongolian wrestlers who had come to dominate the top ranks.

== Family ==
Mainoumi was married in May 1997, to a nightclub manager with two children from a previous marriage.

== Career record ==
Mainoumi Shūhei
Year	January Hatsu basho, Tokyo	March Haru basho, Osaka	May Natsu basho, Tokyo	July Nagoya basho, Nagoya	September Aki basho, Tokyo	November Kyūshū basho, Fukuoka
1990	x	x	Makushita tsukedashi #60; 6–1–PP	East Makushita #32; 5–2	West Makushita #17; 6–1	West Makushita #5; 5–2
1991	East Makushita #1; 4–3	West Jūryō #12; 9–6	West Jūryō #6; 8–7	West Jūryō #2; 9–6	West Maegashira #12; 8–7; T	East Maegashira #9; 8–7; T
1992	East Maegashira #7; 4–11	East Maegashira #15; 9–6	East Maegashira #8; 6–9	East Maegashira #11; 8–7	East Maegashira #6; 7–8	West Maegashira #7; 4–11
1993	East Maegashira #16; 9–6	West Maegashira #11; 6–9	East Maegashira #15; 10–5	West Maegashira #6; 4–11	East Maegashira #14; 9–6; T	East Maegashira #8; 6–9
1994	West Maegashira #12; 8–7	West Maegashira #7; 6–9	East Maegashira #12; 9–6; T	East Maegashira #4; 9–6; T	East Komusubi #1; 2–13	East Maegashira #8; 8–7
1995	West Maegashira #3; 4–11	East Maegashira #9; 6–9	West Maegashira #12; 9–6	East Maegashira #6; 5–10	West Maegashira #11; 8–7	West Maegashira #6; 4–11
1996	East Maegashira #15; 9–6	West Maegashira #6; 6–9	West Maegashira #9; 7–8	West Maegashira #11; 2–1–12	West Jūryō #4; Sat out due to injury 0–0–15	West Jūryō #4; 8–7
1997	West Jūryō #3; 8–7	West Jūryō #2; 10–5	East Maegashira #15; 9–6	East Maegashira #9; 5–10	East Maegashira #14; 8–7	East Maegashira #9; 5–10
1998	West Maegashira #14; 9–6	West Maegashira #10; 5–10	West Jūryō #1; 4–11	East Jūryō #7; 9–6	West Jūryō #2; 8–7	West Jūryō #1; 3–12
1999	East Jūryō #10; 9–6	West Jūryō #3; 9–6	West Jūryō #2; 8–7	West Jūryō #1; 5–10	West Jūryō #5; 5–10	West Jūryō #10; Retired; 6–9
Record given as wins–losses–absences Top division champion Top division runner-up Retired Lower divisions Non-participation Sanshō key: F=Fighting spirit; O=Outstanding performance; T=Technique Also shown: ★=Kinboshi; P=Playoff(s); Divisions: Makuuchi — Jūryō — Makushita — Sandanme — Jonidan — Jonokuchi Makuuchi ranks: Yokozuna — Ōzeki — Sekiwake — Komusubi — Maegashira

== See also ==
- Enhō
- Glossary of sumo terms
- List of past sumo wrestlers
- List of komusubi
