= Kotofuji Takaya =

Japanese sumo wrestler (1964–2025)

Personal information
- Native name: 琴富士 孝也
- Born: Takaya Kobayashi; 28 October 1964 Chiba, Japan
- Died: 8 August 2025 (aged 60)
- Height: 1.92 m (6 ft 3 1/2 in)
- Weight: 145 kg (320 lb)

Sport
- Sport: Sumo
- Retired: September 1995
- Heya: Sadogatake
- Record: 529-528-18
- Debut: March 1980
- Highest rank: Sekiwake (July 1990)
- Elder name: See retirement
- Championships: 1 (Makuuchi); 1 (Sandanme)
- Special Prizes: 2 (Fighting Spirit)
- Gold Stars: 2 (Ōnokuni, Asahifuji)
- Updated on June 2020

Kotofuji Takaya (琴富士 孝也; born Takaya Kobayashi; 28 October 1964 – 8 August 2025) was a Japanese sumo wrestler from Chiba City. His highest rank was sekiwake. In 1991 he won a top division yūshō or tournament championship from the maegashira ranks.

== Career ==
Kotofuji made his professional debut in March 1980. He had a long apprenticeship in the junior ranks, not breaking through to the jūryō division until November 1986. He had an awkward build for sumo, as his long legs meant his hips were high and therefore his centre of gravity was much higher than the ideal. During the short stay of Canadian wrestler Kototenzan at Sadogatake stable, Kotofuji was one of the few wrestlers who attempted to communicate with him in English.

He reached the top makuuchi division in September 1988, scoring 11 wins in his top division debut and receiving a share of the Fighting Spirit prize. He made his san'yaku debut at sekiwake in July 1990 but held the rank for only one tournament. He earned his first gold star in January 1991 with a win over Ōnokuni.

Kotofuji is best remembered for his extraordinary performance in the Nagoya tournament of July 1991, where he became the first maegashira to win the tournament championship in nearly six years. After a poor 5-10 record at maegashira 7 the previous tournament he was ranked at maegashira 13, and fought only his fellow maegashira for the first nine days. Winning all those bouts, he was paired against ōzeki Kirishima, yokozuna Asahifuji and ōzeki Konishiki on days 10 to 12 - and won all of those matches too. It was the first time he had defeated either Asahifuji or Konishiki. His yūshō was confirmed the following day when he defeated sekiwake Takatōriki to go to 13–0, with no else scoring better than ten. He became the first wrestler ranked below ōzeki to win the championship by Day 13 since the introduction of 15-day tournaments. Although he was beaten by Takahanada on Day 14, he defeated Akebono on the final day to finish with an outstanding 14–1 record, two wins clear of runner-up Konishiki on 12–3. Both yokozuna, Asahifuji and Hokutoumi had poor tournaments, turning in scores of 8-7 and 9–6, the worst ever for a tournament with two yokozuna. Kotofuji received his second Fighting Spirit prize as well as the Emperor's Cup. He was as surprised as anyone else at his win, telling an interviewer for Channel 4 that he had just wanted the tournament to be over as soon as possible as he felt sure he wouldn't make it.

Kotofuji never approached anything like those heights again. He scored only 4-11 at komusubi in the following tournament and never made san'yaku again. After a series of poor results he was demoted to the second jūryō division in 1994 and announced his retirement from sumo in September 1995.

== Retirement from sumo ==
Kotofuji became an elder of the Japan Sumo Association, under the name of Kumegawa Oyakata, but he had to leave the sumo world in July 1999 when his toshiyori name was needed by his retiring former stablemate Kotoinazuma. Because his career as an oyakata had lasted less than four years, he was not entitled to any retirement money. Kotofuji then launched a new career as a television personality, doing reporting and sportscasting. He was a member of Konishiki's talent agency. He also worked as a manager of one of ex-sekiwake Takatoriki's yakiniku restaurants.

In February 2014 he was arrested for engaging in a fake marriage to a Korean national so she could receive permanent resident status.

The former Kotofuji suffered from diabetes for many years, but in January 2021, he suffered a cerebral infarction and underwent surgery to remove part of his skull. In September of the same year, he was on the brink of death due to aspiration pneumonia. He was no longer able to speak after his stroke surgery, but he was able to communicate and express emotions. He lost consciousness in October 2024, and died on 8 August 2025, at the age of 60.

== Fighting style ==
Kotofuji was a yotsu-sumo wrestler, preferring a hidari-yotsu, (right hand outside, left hand inside) grip on his opponent's mawashi. His most common winning kimarite was yori-kiri, a straightforward force out, which accounted for half his victories at sekitori level, but he was also fond of using his right hand grip to win by uwatenage, or overarm throw. His height of 192 cm made him amongst the tallest wrestlers but his weight of 145 kg was not much more than most of his competitors.

== Career record ==
Kotofuji Takaya
Year	January Hatsu basho, Tokyo	March Haru basho, Osaka	May Natsu basho, Tokyo	July Nagoya basho, Nagoya	September Aki basho, Tokyo	November Kyūshū basho, Fukuoka
1980	x	(Maezumo)	West Jonokuchi #30; 5–2	West Jonidan #96; 5–2	West Jonidan #56; 5–2	West Jonidan #12; 2–5
1981	East Jonidan #41; 4–3	West Jonidan #22; 4–3	West Jonidan #6; 4–3	East Sandanme #80; 4–3	West Sandanme #68; 5–2	East Sandanme #47; 3–4
1982	East Sandanme #59; 4–3	East Sandanme #40; 4–3	West Sandanme #28; 3–4	West Sandanme #46; 5–2	West Sandanme #14; 5–2	West Makushita #49; 3–4
1983	West Sandanme #2; 4–3	West Makushita #53; 3–4	West Sandanme #8; 4–3	West Makushita #58; 3–4	East Sandanme #15; 7–0–P; Champion	West Makushita #20; 2–5
1984	East Makushita #40; 3–4	East Makushita #53; 4–3	East Makushita #38; 4–3	West Makushita #26; 4–3	East Makushita #18; 2–5	West Makushita #40; 5–2
1985	East Makushita #23; 5–2	East Makushita #10; 4–3	East Makushita #7; 3–4	East Makushita #13; 2–5	West Makushita #29; 6–1	East Makushita #12; 4–3
1986	West Makushita #7; 5–2	West Makushita #2; 2–5	West Makushita #16; 4–3	West Makushita #11; 5–2	East Makushita #4; 5–2	West Jūryō #13; 6–9
1987	East Makushita #4; 5–2	East Jūryō #13; 9–6	West Jūryō #7; 6–9	East Jūryō #11; 9–6	West Jūryō #8; 6–9	East Jūryō #11; 8–7
1988	East Jūryō #8; 8–7	East Jūryō #6; 8–7	West Jūryō #4; 11–4–P	East Jūryō #1; 9–6	East Maegashira #12; 11–4; F	East Maegashira #4; 4–11
1989	East Maegashira #10; 6–9	East Maegashira #13; 9–6	East Maegashira #5; 5–10	East Maegashira #11; 9–6	East Maegashira #6; 8–7	East Maegashira #2; 4–11
1990	West Maegashira #8; 8–7	East Maegashira #6; 9–6	West Maegashira #1; 8–7	West Sekiwake #1; 4–11	East Maegashira #5; 7–8	West Maegashira #6; 8–7
1991	East Maegashira #3; 5–10 ★	East Maegashira #10; 8–7	West Maegashira #7; 5–10	East Maegashira #13; 14–1; F★	East Komusubi #2; 4–11	West Maegashira #6; 6–9
1992	West Maegashira #11; 8–7	East Maegashira #6; 8–7	West Maegashira #3; 6–9	East Maegashira #7; 8–7	East Maegashira #3; 4–11	East Maegashira #11; 6–9
1993	West Maegashira #15; 9–6	East Maegashira #10; 8–7	West Maegashira #7; 7–8	West Maegashira #9; 11–4	East Maegashira #2; 6–9	West Maegashira #4; Sat out due to injury 0–0–15
1994	West Maegashira #4; 3–12	East Maegashira #14; 8–7	West Maegashira #12; 9–6	West Maegashira #4; 4–11	East Maegashira #12; 4–11	East Jūryō #3; 5–10
1995	East Jūryō #11; 8–7	East Jūryō #10; 8–7	East Jūryō #8; 7–8	East Jūryō #10; 8–7	West Jūryō #9; Retired; 2–10	x
Record given as wins–losses–absences Top division champion Top division runner-up Retired Lower divisions Non-participation Sanshō key: F=Fighting spirit; O=Outstanding performance; T=Technique Also shown: ★=Kinboshi; P=Playoff(s); Divisions: Makuuchi — Jūryō — Makushita — Sandanme — Jonidan — Jonokuchi Makuuchi ranks: Yokozuna — Ōzeki — Sekiwake — Komusubi — Maegashira

== See also ==
- Glossary of sumo terms
- List of sumo tournament top division champions
- List of past sumo wrestlers
- List of sekiwake
