= Ryōgoku Kajinosuke IV =

Japanese sumo wrestler

Personal information
- Native name: 両国 梶之助
- Born: Hideaki Kobayashi; 30 July 1962 (age 64) Nagasaki, Japan
- Height: 1.85 m (6 ft 1 in)
- Weight: 171 kg (377 lb)

Sport
- Sport: Sumo
- Retired: January, 1993
- Heya: Dewanoumi
- Record: 316-313-20
- Debut: March, 1985
- Highest rank: Komusubi (July, 1987)
- Elder name: Sakaigawa
- Championships: 1 (Jūryō)
- Special Prizes: Outstanding Performance (1); Fighting Spirit (1)
- Gold Stars: 3 (Chiyonofuji)
- Updated on May, 2008

Ryōgoku Kajinosuke IV (born 30 July 1962 as Hideaki Kobayashi) is a former sumo wrestler from Nagasaki, Japan. His highest rank was komusubi. He is now a sumo coach under the name of Sakaigawa.

== Career ==
He was a premature baby, who had to be given special care because of his tiny size. He was interested in sumo from a young age, but played soccer until high school as there was no opportunity to practise sumo at his junior high. He was an amateur sumo champion at Nihon University, where he won six major titles. Upon joining the professional sport he had makushita tsukedashi status, allowing him to make his debut at the bottom of the third makushita division. He had a losing score in his first tournament and so his first appearance on the banzuke ranking sheets was actually in the fourth sandanme division. However, he responded with five straight winning records and was promoted to the second jūryō division for the first time in March 1986. After taking part in two playoffs for the jūryō championship in November 1986 and January 1987 he was promoted to the top makuuchi division for the March 1987 tournament. Until this point he had been fighting simply as Kobayashiyama, based on his own surname, but to mark his promotion he was granted the shikona of Ryōgoku, which had previously been used by three previous wrestlers from his Dewanoumi stable, most notably sekiwake Ryōgoku Kajinosuke II, who won the makuuchi division yūshō in 1914 at his first attempt. He was initially known as simply Ryōgoku Hideaki, before switching to the full Ryōgoku Kajinosuke shikona in 1989.

He achieved kachi-koshi in his first two top division tournaments and reached komusubi rank in July 1987. It was to be his highest rank, and he held it on three further occasions. He earned two special prizes for Outstanding Performance and Fighting Spirit. His three kinboshi for defeating yokozuna were all earned against Chiyonofuji. In July 1990 he not only defeated Chiyonofuji but was also the only man to beat the winner of the tournament, Asahifuji. Injury problems in his later career forced Ryōgoku's demotion back down to jūryō a couple of times, and he retired in January 1993.

== Retirement from sumo ==
Ryōgoku remained in the sumo world as an elder of the Japan Sumo Association, under the name Nakadachi Oyakata. He established his own training stable, Nakadachi stable in 1998. In 2003 he switched kabu for the Sakaigawa elder name with former yokozuna Sadanoyama. Therefore the stable was renamed Sakaigawa. Sakaigawa-oyakata is notably part of the Japan Sumo Association board of directors (riji). Ryōgoku successfully transitioned as a trainer, his stable producing a lot of talented rikishi, with seven sekitori as of 2011. His first top division wrestler was Iwakiyama in 2002, a former amateur champion, followed by Hochiyama in 2006. In 2014 his most senior wrestler Gōeidō reached ōzeki rank and won a tournament championship in 2016.

== Career record ==
Ryōgoku Kajinosuke
Year	January Hatsu basho, Tokyo	March Haru basho, Osaka	May Natsu basho, Tokyo	July Nagoya basho, Nagoya	September Aki basho, Tokyo	November Kyūshū basho, Fukuoka
1985	x	Makushita tsukedashi #60; 2–5	East Sandanme #24; 6–1	West Makushita #50; 6–1	East Makushita #25; 5–2	West Makushita #12; 5–2
1986	West Makushita #4; 6–1	West Jūryō #12; 6–9	East Makushita #4; 5–2	East Jūryō #13; 8–7	West Jūryō #9; 8–7	West Jūryō #7; 10–5–P
1987	East Jūryō #3; 10–5–P	West Maegashira #12; 9–6	West Maegashira #5; 8–7	West Komusubi #1; 6–9	East Maegashira #2; 5–10	East Maegashira #8; 10–5
1988	East Komusubi #1; 5–10	West Maegashira #2; 6–9	West Maegashira #5; 8–7	East Maegashira #1; 6–9	East Maegashira #4; 9–6	East Maegashira #1; 7–8
1989	East Maegashira #2; 6–9	East Maegashira #5; 6–6–3	East Maegashira #8; 8–7	East Maegashira #4; 5–10	West Maegashira #8; 9–6	East Maegashira #3; 10–5; O★
1990	West Komusubi #1; 4–11	West Maegashira #6; 11–4; F★	East Komusubi #1; 6–9	West Maegashira #3; 7–8 ★	East Maegashira #4; 3–8–4	West Maegashira #13; 2–13
1991	East Jūryō #9; 12–3–P; Champion	East Jūryō #1; 9–6	West Maegashira #15; 10–5	West Maegashira #7; 7–8	West Maegashira #9; 7–8	West Maegashira #10; 10–5
1992	West Maegashira #3; 5–10	East Maegashira #9; 4–11	East Maegashira #16; 10–5	East Maegashira #9; 6–5–4	West Maegashira #11; 2–13	West Jūryō #7; 1–5–9
1993	East Makushita #12; Retired –	x	x	x	x	x
Record given as wins–losses–absences Top division champion Top division runner-up Retired Lower divisions Non-participation Sanshō key: F=Fighting spirit; O=Outstanding performance; T=Technique Also shown: ★=Kinboshi; P=Playoff(s); Divisions: Makuuchi — Jūryō — Makushita — Sandanme — Jonidan — Jonokuchi Makuuchi ranks: Yokozuna — Ōzeki — Sekiwake — Komusubi — Maegashira

== See also ==
- List of sumo elders
- List of sumo tournament second division champions
- Glossary of sumo terms
- List of past sumo wrestlers
- List of komusubi
