= Daishōhō Masami =

Sumo wrestler

Personal information
- Native name: 大翔鳳 昌巳
- Born: Masami Murata; 7 May 1967 Toyohira, Sapporo, Hokkaidō
- Died: 4 December 1999 (aged 32)
- Height: 1.86 m (6 ft 1 in)
- Weight: 146.5 kg (323 lb)

Sport
- Sport: Sumo
- Retired: July, 1999
- Heya: Tatsunami
- Record: 369-380-65
- Debut: January, 1990
- Highest rank: Komusubi (January, 1993)
- Championships: 1 (Jūryō)
- Special Prizes: Fighting Spirit (2)
- Updated on July 2007

Daishōhō Masami (7 May 1967 – 4 December 1999) was a sumo wrestler from Hokkaidō, Japan. His highest rank was komusubi.

== Career ==
Born in Sapporo, he took up skiing as a young boy, as he came from an area famous for its ski slopes. He also played basketball at school. However his father was an amateur sumo enthusiast and encouraged his son to try the sport. In his third year of junior high he took part in the National Junior High School Sumo Championships, held in Tokyo, and was put up in Tatsunami stable during the championships. Daishoho was an amateur sumo champion at Nihon University, and after graduation he returned to Tatsunami stable. He entered professional sumo in January 1990 at the makushita level, and quickly reached the top makuuchi division in July 1991. His best performance in a tournament was in September 1992 when he was runner-up to Takahanada with 11 wins. He reached his highest rank of komusubi in January 1993, but after that he was plagued by a number of injuries to his knees, back and triceps. He fell back to the jūryō division after pulling out of the January 1997 tournament on the 4th day.

== Retirement and death ==
In 1999 Daishoho was diagnosed with pancreatic cancer. He wanted to receive treatment whilst still remaining active on the dohyo, but in June he was persuaded by his doctors to enter hospital full-time and so retired from sumo. Since it was clear that he would be unlikely to live long enough to have a formal retirement ceremony (danpatsu-shiki) at the Ryogoku Kokugikan, which normally takes place up to a year after retiring, in October 1999 his fellow wrestler and graduate of Nihon University Mainoumi organised a private function for him which was attended by around 400 people including wrestlers such as Konishiki and Musashimaru and his former stablemaster Haguroyama, although senior members of the Sumo Association and his former coach at Nihon University Hidetoshi Tanaka did not attend as it was an unsanctioned event. Daishoho's weight had dropped from 150 kg to below 90 kg. He died on 4 December 1999 at the age of 32 due to pancreatic cancer.

== Fighting style ==
Daishoho liked pushing techniques, particularly tsuppari, a series of rapid thrusts to the chest. However, he was also good at fighting on the mawashi or belt, where he preferred a migi-yotsu grip, a left hand outside and right hand inside position. His most commonly used kimarite were yorikiri (force out), oshidashi (push out) and uwatenage (overarm throw).

== Career record ==
Daishōhō Masami
Year	January Hatsu basho, Tokyo	March Haru basho, Osaka	May Natsu basho, Tokyo	July Nagoya basho, Nagoya	September Aki basho, Tokyo	November Kyūshū basho, Fukuoka
1990	Makushita tsukedashi #60; 6–1	East Makushita #32; 5–2	East Makushita #17; 5–2	East Makushita #10; 5–2	East Makushita #4; 5–2	East Makushita #1; 5–2
1991	West Jūryō #12; 11–4	East Jūryō #6; 10–5	East Jūryō #2; 11–4; Champion	West Maegashira #13; 8–7	East Maegashira #10; 6–9	West Maegashira #12; 7–8
1992	East Maegashira #14; 8–7	West Maegashira #9; 9–6	East Maegashira #4; 8–7	West Maegashira #2; 5–10	West Maegashira #8; 11–4; F	East Maegashira #1; 9–6
1993	East Komusubi #1; 4–11	East Maegashira #5; 6–9	East Maegashira #9; 8–7	East Maegashira #5; 5–10	West Maegashira #10; 9–6	East Maegashira #3; 6–8–1
1994	West Maegashira #5; Sat out due to injury 0–0–15	West Maegashira #5; 3–12	West Maegashira #14; 9–6	West Maegashira #7; 6–9	East Maegashira #13; 8–7	East Maegashira #7; 6–9
1995	West Maegashira #11; 11–4; F	West Komusubi #1; 5–10	East Maegashira #3; 5–10	East Maegashira #7; 6–9	West Maegashira #10; 6–9	West Maegashira #14; 10–5
1996	West Maegashira #8; 7–8	West Maegashira #10; 8–7	West Maegashira #4; 10–5	West Komusubi #2; 2–13	West Maegashira #5; 8–7	East Maegashira #1; 1–14
1997	East Maegashira #14; 2–2–11	East Jūryō #6; Sat out due to injury 0–0–15	East Jūryō #6; 5–10	West Jūryō #11; 8–7	East Jūryō #9; 8–7	East Jūryō #4; 5–10
1998	East Jūryō #9; 8–7	East Jūryō #7; 10–5	East Jūryō #3; 5–9–1	East Jūryō #9; 8–7	West Jūryō #7; 8–7	West Jūryō #4; 5–10
1999	West Jūryō #10; 9–6	East Jūryō #5; 5–10	East Jūryō #10; Sat out due to injury 0–0–15	West Makushita #10; Retired –	x	x
Record given as wins–losses–absences Top division champion Top division runner-up Retired Lower divisions Non-participation Sanshō key: F=Fighting spirit; O=Outstanding performance; T=Technique Also shown: ★=Kinboshi; P=Playoff(s); Divisions: Makuuchi — Jūryō — Makushita — Sandanme — Jonidan — Jonokuchi Makuuchi ranks: Yokozuna — Ōzeki — Sekiwake — Komusubi — Maegashira

== See also ==
- List of sumo tournament second division champions
- Glossary of sumo terms
- List of past sumo wrestlers
- List of komusubi
