= 1992 in sumo =

The following are the events in professional sumo during 1992.

== Tournaments ==
=== Hatsu basho ===
Ryōgoku Kokugikan, Tokyo, 12 January – 26 January

1992 Hatsu basho results - Makuuchi Division
W		L		A	East			Rank	West			W		L		A
0	-	0	-	15	ø	(Japan)	Hokutoumi	Y	ø	(Japan)	Asahifuji	0	-	4	-	11
12	-	3	-	0		(United States)	**Konishiki**	O		(Japan)	**Kirishima**	8	-	7	-	0
7	-	8	-	0		(Japan)	Kotonishiki	S		(Japan)	Takatōriki	7	-	8	-	0
8	-	7	-	0		(Japan)	**Tochinowaka**	K		(United States)	**Akebono**	13	-	2	-	0
8	-	7	-	0		(Japan)	**Mitoizumi**	M1		(Japan)	**Wakahanada**	10	-	5	-	0
14	-	1	-	0		(Japan)	**Takahanada**	M2		(Japan)	Daishōyama	5	-	10	-	0
9	-	6	-	0		(United States)	**Musashimaru**	M3		(Japan)	Ryōgoku	5	-	10	-	0
6	-	9	-	0		(Japan)	Kitakachidoki	M4		(Japan)	Kirinishiki	7	-	8	-	0
8	-	7	-	0		(Japan)	**Akinoshima**	M5		(Japan)	**Misugisato**	8	-	7	-	0
7	-	8	-	0		(Japan)	Kyokudōzan	M6		(Japan)	**Kushimaumi**	8	-	7	-	0
4	-	11	-	0		(Japan)	Mainoumi	M7		(Japan)	Sakahoko	6	-	9	-	0
8	-	7	-	0		(Japan)	**Terao**	M8		(Japan)	Kotogaume	5	-	10	-	0
6	-	9	-	0		(Japan)	Wakasegawa	M9		(Japan)	Kotonowaka	7	-	8	-	0
6	-	9	-	0		(Japan)	Kiraihō	M10		(Japan)	**Kasugafuji**	8	-	7	-	0
10	-	5	-	0		(Japan)	**Takanonami**	M11		(Japan)	**Kotofuji**	8	-	7	-	0
8	-	7	-	0		(Japan)	**Tomoefuji**	M12		(Japan)	**Takamisugi**	8	-	7	-	0
6	-	9	-	0		(Japan)	Daizen	M13		(Japan)	Kototsubaki	7	-	8	-	0
8	-	7	-	0		(Japan)	**Daishōhō**	M14		(Japan)	Tatsuhikari	7	-	8	-	0
4	-	11	-	0		(Japan)	Ōzutsu	M15		(Japan)	Wakashoyo	6	-	9	-	0
8	-	7	-	0		(Japan)	**Tsunenoyama**	M16		(Japan)	**Kotoinazuma**	8	-	7	-	0

ø - Indicates a pull-out or absent rank
**winning record in bold**
**Yusho Winner**

=== Haru basho ===
Osaka Prefectural Gymnasium, Osaka, 8 March – 22 March

1992 Haru basho results - Makuuchi Division
W		L		A	East			Rank	West			W		L		A
0	-	3	-	12	ø	(Japan)	Hokutoumi	Y	ø							
13	-	2	-	0		(United States)	**Konishiki**	O		(Japan)	**Kirishima**	12	-	3	-	0
8	-	7	-	0		(United States)	**Akebono**	S		(Japan)	Takahanada	5	-	10	-	0
12	-	3	-	0		(Japan)	**Tochinowaka**	K	ø	(Japan)	Wakahanada	0	-	10	-	5
					ø			HD		(Japan)	**Mitoizumi**	8	-	7	-	0
9	-	6	-	0		(Japan)	**Kotonishiki**	M1		(United States)	**Musashimaru**	9	-	6	-	0
6	-	9	-	0		(Japan)	Takatōriki	M2		(Japan)	**Akinoshima**	12	-	3	-	0
8	-	7	-	0		(Japan)	**Misugisato**	M3		(Japan)	Kushimaumi	7	-	8	-	0
5	-	10	-	0		(Japan)	Takanonami	M4		(Japan)	**Terao**	8	-	7	-	0
7	-	8	-	0		(Japan)	Kirinishiki	M5		(Japan)	Kasugafuji	4	-	11	-	0
8	-	7	-	0		(Japan)	**Kotofuji**	M6		(Japan)	**Tomoefuji**	9	-	6	-	0
7	-	8	-	0		(Japan)	Takamisugi	M7		(Japan)	Kitakachidoki	6	-	9	-	0
9	-	6	-	0		(Japan)	**Daishōyama**	M8		(Japan)	**Kyokudōzan**	8	-	7	-	0
4	-	11	-	0		(Japan)	Ryōgoku	M9		(Japan)	**Daishōhō**	9	-	6	-	0
5	-	10	-	0		(Japan)	Sakahoko	M10		(Japan)	**Toyonoumi**	9	-	6	-	0
7	-	8	-	0		(Japan)	Kotonowaka	M11		(Japan)	Oginohana	6	-	9	-	0
6	-	9	-	0		(Japan)	Tsunenoyama	M12	ø	(Japan)	Kotoinazuma	3	-	4	-	8
7	-	8	-	0		(Japan)	Wakasegawa	M13		(Japan)	**Kiraihō**	9	-	6	-	0
3	-	12	-	0		(Japan)	Kotogaume	M14		(Japan)	**Kototsubaki**	8	-	7	-	0
9	-	6	-	0		(Japan)	**Mainoumi**	M15		(Japan)	**Tatsuhikari**	8	-	7	-	0
7	-	8	-	0		(Japan)	Daizen	M16		(Japan)	Hananokuni	6	-	9	-	0

ø - Indicates a pull-out or absent rank
**winning record in bold**
**Yusho Winner**

=== Natsu basho ===
Ryōgoku Kokugikan, Tokyo, 10 May – 24 May

1992 Natsu basho results - Makuuchi Division
W		L		A	East			Rank	West			W		L		A
0	-	0	-	0	ø	(Japan)	Hokutoumi	Y	ø							
9	-	6	-	0		(United States)	**Konishiki**	O	ø	(Japan)	Kirishima	0	-	4	-	11
2	-	9	-	4	ø	(Japan)	Tochinowaka	S		(United States)	**Akebono**	13	-	2	-	0
9	-	6	-	0		(Japan)	**Akinoshima**	K		(Japan)	Mitoizumi	7	-	8	-	0
9	-	6	-	0		(Japan)	**Kotonishiki**	HD		(United States)	**Musashimaru**	8	-	7	-	0
10	-	5	-	0		(Japan)	**Misugisato**	M1		(Japan)	**Tomoefuji**	8	-	7	-	0
2	-	13	-	0		(Japan)	Terao	M2		(Japan)	**Takahanada**	9	-	6	-	0
6	-	9	-	0		(Japan)	Daishōyama	M3		(Japan)	Kotofuji	6	-	9	-	0
8	-	7	-	0		(Japan)	**Daishōhō**	M4		(Japan)	**Kushimaumi**	8	-	7	-	0
6	-	9	-	0		(Japan)	Takatōriki	M5		(Japan)	**Toyonoumi**	8	-	7	-	0
9	-	6	-	0		(Japan)	**Kyokudōzan**	M6		(Japan)	Kirinishiki	5	-	2	-	8
9	-	6	-	0		(Japan)	**Kiraihō**	M7		(Japan)	**Wakahanada**	11	-	4	-	0
6	-	9	-	0		(Japan)	Mainoumi	M8		(Japan)	**Takamisugi**	8	-	7	-	0
10	-	5	-	0		(Japan)	**Kototsubaki**	M9		(Japan)	**Tatsuhikari**	8	-	7	-	0
7	-	8	-	0		(Japan)	Takanonami	M10		(Japan)	**Kitakachidoki**	8	-	7	-	0
5	-	10	-	0		(Japan)	Wakashoyo	M11		(Japan)	Kasugafuji	4	-	11	-	0
8	-	7	-	0		(Japan)	**Wakanoyama**	M12		(Japan)	**Kotonowaka**	8	-	7	-	0
6	-	9	-	0		(Japan)	Tamakairiki	M13		(Japan)	**Oginohana**	9	-	6	-	0
8	-	7	-	0		(Japan)	**Tokitsunada**	M14	ø	(Japan)	Wakasegawa	3	-	11	-	1
8	-	7	-	0		(Japan)	**Tsunenoyama**	M15		(Japan)	Sakahoko	4	-	11	-	0
10	-	5	-	0		(Japan)	**Ryōgoku**	M16	ø							

ø - Indicates a pull-out or absent rank
**winning record in bold**
**Yusho Winner**

=== Nagoya basho ===
Aichi Prefectural Gymnasium, Nagoya, 5 July – 19 July

1992 Nagoya basho results - Makuuchi Division
W		L		A	East			Rank	West			W		L		A
0	-	0	-	15	ø	(United States)	Akebono	O		(United States)	**Konishiki**	10	-	5	-	0
11	-	4	-	0		(Japan)	**Kirishima**	HD	ø							
10	-	5	-	0		(Japan)	**Akinoshima**	S		(Japan)	Kotonishiki	6	-	9	-	0
11	-	4	-	0		(United States)	**Musashimaru**	K		(Japan)	**Misugisato**	8	-	7	-	0
8	-	7	-	0		(Japan)	**Takahanada**	HD	ø	(Japan)	Tomoefuji	0	-	2	-	13
4	-	9	-	2	ø	(Japan)	Wakahanada	M1		(Japan)	**Mitoizumi**	13	-	2	-	0
9	-	6	-	0		(Japan)	**Kyokudōzan**	M2		(Japan)	Daishōhō	5	-	10	-	0
6	-	9	-	0		(Japan)	Kushimaumi	M3	ø	(Japan)	Kototsubaki	5	-	5	-	5
7	-	8	-	0		(Japan)	Kiraihō	M4		(Japan)	**Toyonoumi**	8	-	7	-	0
5	-	10	-	0		(Japan)	Tochinowaka	M5		(Japan)	Takamisugi	7	-	8	-	0
8	-	7	-	0		(Japan)	**Daishōyama**	M6		(Japan)	Tatsuhikari	4	-	11	-	0
8	-	7	-	0		(Japan)	**Kotofuji**	M7		(Japan)	Kitakachidoki	7	-	8	-	0
9	-	6	-	0		(Japan)	**Takatōriki**	M8	ø	(Japan)	**Oginohana**	8	-	5	-	2
6	-	5	-	4	ø	(Japan)	Ryōgoku	M9		(Japan)	Wakanoyama	6	-	9	-	0
8	-	7	-	0		(Japan)	**Kotonowaka**	M10		(Japan)	**Kirinishiki**	8	-	7	-	0
8	-	7	-	0		(Japan)	**Mainoumi**	M11		(Japan)	**Tokitsunada**	8	-	7	-	0
4	-	11	-	0		(Japan)	Tsunenoyama	M12		(Japan)	**Takanonami**	9	-	6	-	0
9	-	6	-	0		(Japan)	**Terao**	M13		(Japan)	Enazakura	4	-	11	-	0
7	-	8	-	0		(Japan)	Daizen	M14		(Japan)	Kenkō	3	-	12	-	0
8	-	7	-	0		(Japan)	**Kotogaume**	M15		(Japan)	Tachihikari	7	-	8	-	0
6	-	9	-	0		(Japan)	Hananokuni	M16	ø							

ø - Indicates a pull-out or absent rank
**winning record in bold**
**Yusho Winner**

=== Aki basho ===
Ryōgoku Kokugikan, Tokyo, 13 September – 27 September

1992 Aki basho results - Makuuchi Division
W		L		A	East			Rank	West			W		L		A
7	-	8	-	0		(Japan)	Kirishima	O		(United States)	**Konishiki**	9	-	6	-	0
9	-	6	-	0		(United States)	**Akebono**	HD	ø							
8	-	7	-	0		(Japan)	**Akinoshima**	S		(United States)	**Musashimaru**	10	-	5	-	0
					ø			HD		(Japan)	**Mitoizumi**	8	-	7	-	0
5	-	10	-	0		(Japan)	Misugisato	K		(Japan)	**Takahanada**	14	-	1	-	0
8	-	7	-	0		(Japan)	**Kyokudōzan**	HD	ø							
11	-	4	-	0		(Japan)	**Kotonishiki**	M1		(Japan)	Toyonoumi	5	-	10	-	0
10	-	5	-	0		(Japan)	**Takatōriki**	M2		(Japan)	Daishōyama	5	-	10	-	0
4	-	11	-	0		(Japan)	Kotofuji	M3	ø	(Japan)	Oginohana	5	-	7	-	3
7	-	8	-	0		(Japan)	Kotonowaka	M4		(Japan)	Kiraihō	4	-	11	-	0
4	-	11	-	0		(Japan)	Kirinishiki	M5		(Japan)	Takanonami	6	-	9	-	0
7	-	8	-	0		(Japan)	Mainoumi	M6		(Japan)	**Kushimaumi**	8	-	7	-	0
9	-	6	-	0		(Japan)	**Takamisugi**	M7		(Japan)	Tokitsunada	6	-	9	-	0
9	-	6	-	0		(Japan)	**Terao**	M8		(Japan)	**Daishōhō**	11	-	4	-	0
8	-	7	-	0		(Japan)	**Wakahanada**	M9		(Japan)	**Kitakachidoki**	8	-	7	-	0
5	-	10	-	0		(Japan)	Kototsubaki	M10		(Japan)	Kotogaume	6	-	9	-	0
9	-	6	-	0		(Japan)	**Tochinowaka**	M11		(Japan)	Ryōgoku	2	-	13	-	0
6	-	9	-	0		(Japan)	Wakanoyama	M12		(Japan)	**Tatsuhikari**	8	-	7	-	0
9	-	6	-	0		(Japan)	**Tomoefuji**	M13		(Japan)	**Wakashoyo**	10	-	5	-	0
9	-	6	-	0		(Japan)	**Tamakairiki**	M14		(Japan)	**Daizen**	10	-	5	-	0
6	-	9	-	0		(Japan)	Naminohana	M15		(Japan)	**Kotoinazuma**	8	-	7	-	0
6	-	9	-	0		(Japan)	Asahisato	M16	ø							

ø - Indicates a pull-out or absent rank
**winning record in bold**
**Yusho Winner**

=== Kyushu basho ===
Fukuoka International Centre, Kyushu, 8 November – 22 November

1992 Kyushu basho results - Makuuchi Division
W		L		A	East			Rank	West			W		L		A
0	-	2	-	13	ø	(United States)	Konishiki	O		(United States)	**Akebono**	14	-	1	-	0
1	-	7	-	7	ø	(Japan)	Kirishima	HD	ø							
9	-	6	-	0		(United States)	**Musashimaru**	S		(Japan)	**Takahanada**	10	-	5	-	0
7	-	8	-	0		(Japan)	Akinoshima	HD	ø	(Japan)	Mitoizumi	1	-	12	-	2
13	-	2	-	0		(Japan)	**Kotonishiki**	K		(Japan)	Kyokudōzan	4	-	11	-	0
					ø			HD		(Japan)	Takatōriki	5	-	10	-	0
9	-	6	-	0		(Japan)	**Daishōhō**	M1		(Japan)	**Takamisugi**	8	-	7	-	0
7	-	8	-	0		(Japan)	Terao	M2		(Japan)	**Kushimaumi**	8	-	7	-	0
8	-	7	-	0		(Japan)	**Misugisato**	M3		(Japan)	Tochinowaka	7	-	8	-	0
8	-	7	-	0		(Japan)	**Wakashoyo**	M4		(Japan)	**Wakahanada**	9	-	6	-	0
7	-	8	-	0		(Japan)	Kitakachidoki	M5		(Japan)	**Daizen**	9	-	6	-	0
7	-	8	-	0		(Japan)	Kotonowaka	M6		(Japan)	**Tomoefuji**	10	-	5	-	0
9	-	6	-	0		(Japan)	**Toyonoumi**	M7		(Japan)	Mainoumi	4	-	11	-	0
6	-	9	-	0		(Japan)	Tamakairiki	M8		(Japan)	Daishōyama	5	-	10	-	0
6	-	9	-	0		(Japan)	Tatsuhikari	M9		(Japan)	**Oginohana**	8	-	7	-	0
9	-	6	-	0		(Japan)	**Takanonami**	M10		(Japan)	Kotoinazuma	7	-	8	-	0
6	-	9	-	0		(Japan)	Kotofuji	M11		(Japan)	Kiraihō	7	-	8	-	0
9	-	6	-	0		(Japan)	**Tokitsunada**	M12		(Japan)	**Kirinishiki**	8	-	7	-	0
7	-	8	-	0		(Japan)	Kotogaume	M13		(Japan)	**Kasugafuji**	9	-	6	-	0
10	-	4	-	1	ø	(Japan)	**Kototsubaki**	M14		(Japan)	**Kotobeppu**	10	-	5	-	0
5	-	10	-	0		(Japan)	Wakanoyama	M15		(Japan)	Hananokuni	5	-	10	-	0

ø - Indicates a pull-out or absent rank
**winning record in bold**
**Yusho Winner**

== News ==
=== January ===
- Yokozuna Asahifuji retires after losing his first three bouts, leaving the injured Hokutoumi as the only yokozuna on the banzuke.
- Maegashira Takahanada wins his first makuuchi yusho with a 14-1 record, the youngest ever to do so. He wins all three special prizes for Technique, Outstanding Performance and Fighting Spirit. Runner-up is Akebono on 13-2, who shares the Outstanding Performance and Fighting Spirit prizes. Ozeki Konishiki, who won the previous tournament in November 1991 and is aiming for yokozuna promotion, can only manage third place with a 12-3 score. Takahanada's brother Wakahanada shares the Technique prize. Toyonoumi wins the juryo division championship. Veteran former komusubi Tamaryu retires.

=== February ===
- Dewanoumi Oyakata, former yokozuna Sadanoyama, becomes the chairman of the Japan Sumo Association after Futagoyama Oyakata, the former yokozuna Wakanohana, steps down.
- Former yokozuna Chiyonofuji, who retired in May 1991, has his official retirement ceremony at the Ryogoku Kokugikan.
- Konishiki and his new wife, a fashion model, hold a wedding reception in Tokyo.

=== March ===
- Konishiki wins his third career championship with a 13-2 record, but is not promoted to yokozuna. The chairman of the Yokozuna Deliberation Council, Hideo Ueda says, "We want to make doubly sure that Konishiki is worthy to be a grand champion. Therefore, we decided to wait for another tournament." After this, Konishiki never won more than 10 bouts in a single tournament again.

=== April ===
- Chiyonofuji becomes head coach of Kokonoe stable.
- Konishiki is quoted in the New York Times as saying, "if I were Japanese, I would be there (yokozuna) already," causing an international furore.

=== May ===
- Hokutoumi announces his retirement, leaving no yokozuna for the first time in over 60 years. He is the fourth yokozuna in a year to retire, following Chiyonofuji in May 1991, Onokuni in July 1991, and Asahifuji in January.
- Akebono wins the championship with a 13-2 record and is promoted to ozeki. He also receives the Outstanding Performance award. Konishiki can manage only a 9-6 record, meaning he is no longer on a yokozuna promotion run and must start over. The runner-up is Wakahanada on 11-4, who wins his third Technique Award. Veteran Misugisato wins his first (and only) special prize in his career, for Fighting Spirit. Former sekiwake Ozutsu and Tochitsukasa, and former komusubi Takanofuji, all retire. Another former sekiwake, Kotogaume, wins the juryo championship. Former Nihon University champion Sakamotoyama wins the makushita division title with a perfect 7-0 record.

=== July ===
- Maegashira Mitoizumi is the surprise winner of the championship with a 13-2 record. He is the fourth maegashira-ranked yusho winner in a year, following Kotofuji in July 1991, Kotonishiki in September 1991, and Takahanada in January. He finishes two wins ahead of Musashimaru, who wins his first Technique Award, and ozeki Kirishima on 11-4. Mitoizumi also receives his sixth Fighting Spirit prize. The Outstanding Performance prize goes to Kyokudozan for defeating the two highest ranked wrestlers on the banzuke (Kirishima and Konishiki). The juryo championship goes to Wakashoyo. Former maegashira Wakasegawa retires.

=== September ===
- Takahanada wins his second championship with a 14–1 record from the rank of komusubi. He also wins his fourth Outstanding Performance prize. His closest challengers are two maegashira, Kotonishiki and Daishoho, both on 11-4. Daishoho shares the Fighting Spirit prize with Kyokudozan, who gets a winning record in his komusubi debut. Kotobeppu wins the juryo championship, while 28 year old ex-teacher and amateur champion Narimatsu wins the makushita championship. Izutsu stable's Sakahoko and Sasshunada both retire.

=== November ===
- Akebono wins his second championship. Kirishima loses his ozeki status.

== See also ==
- List of years in sumo
