= 1988 in sumo =

The following is a list of events in professional sumo in 1988. Six honbasho or official tournaments are held each year.

== Tournaments ==
- Hatsu basho, Ryōgoku Kokugikan, Tokyo, 10 – 24 January
- Haru basho, Osaka Prefectural Gymnasium, Osaka, 13 – 27 March
- Natsu basho, Ryōgoku Kokugikan, Tokyo, 8 – 22 May
- Nagoya basho, Aichi Prefectural Gymnasium, Nagoya, 3 – 17 July
- Aki basho, Ryōgoku Kokugikan, Tokyo, 11 – 25 September
- Kyushu basho, Fukuoka International Centre, Kyushu, 13 – 27 November

== News ==
=== January ===
- At the opening tournament of the year, new ōzeki Asahifuji wins his first yūshō or tournament championship, defeating his nemesis Chiyonofuji on the final day for only the second time in 22 meetings. Asahifuji finishes on 14–1, one win ahead of fellow ōzeki Konishiki. Asahifuji's title is the first yūshō for his group of stables, the Tatsunami-Isegahama ichimon, for nearly 19 years – the last was Kiyokuni's in July 1969. Chiyonofuji can manage only third place on 12–3, alongside maegashira Kotogaume, who wins the Fighting Spirit Prize. Sakahoko wins the Outstanding Performance Award for his defeat of Chiyonofuji. Veteran former sekiwake Dewanohana announces his retirement, as does his stablemate, former komusubi Onishiki. And the oldest man in sumo, 40-year-old Oshio, ends his 26-year professional career after a losing record in the makushita division.

=== March ===
- The Osaka tournament is won by Onokuni, who captures his first yūshō as a yokozuna by defeating Hokutoumi twice on the final day, once in regulation and once in a playoff. Chiyonofuji misses the tournament through injury. Veteran Kirinji, the oldest man in the top division, wins his fourth Fighting Spirit prize. Wakasegawa wins the jūryō championship and earns promotion back to makuuchi.

=== May ===
- Chiyonofuji wins the May tournament with a 14–1 record. His only defeat is to sekiwake Kotogaume, who earns the Outstanding Performance prize. Veteran Daijuyama, making his first san'yaku appearance in over five years, wins the Fighting Spirit prize. Hidenohana wins the jūryō championship at his first attempt. Lower down the divisions, Oginohana wins the makushita yūshō and Wakahanada the jonokuchi title.

=== July ===
- Chiyonofuji wins the July tournament with a perfect 15–0 record. Hokutoumi misses the tournament with a back injury.

=== September ===
- Chiyonofuji wins his third tournament in a row, and once again emerges undefeated. His winning streak reaches 39 matches, a postwar record second only to Taiho's 45.

=== November ===
- All eyes are on Chiyonofuji, who continues his winning run, equalling Taiho's mark on Day 6 with a win over Jingaku and surpassing it the next day by beating Hananokuni. Speculation that he might go on and challenge Futabayama's all-time record of 69 is ended, however, after he is beaten on the last day by Onokuni. His streak stops at 53, but he still finishes with his 26th championship and a 14–1 record.

== Deaths ==
- 29 October: the 46th yokozuna Asashio Taro III, also Takasago Oyakata, of a stroke aged 58.

== See also ==
- Glossary of sumo terms
- List of years in sumo
