= 1989 in sumo =

The following is a list of events in professional sumo in 1989.

== Tournaments ==
- Ryōgoku Kokugikan, Tokyo, January 9–23
  - Makuuchi Champion: Hokutoumi Nobuyoshi (14–1, 4th title)
  - Jūryō Champion: Tochitsukasa Tetsushi (11–4)
- Osaka Prefectural Gymnasium, Osaka, March 12–26
  - Makuuchi Champion: Chiyonofuji Mitsugu (14–1, 27th)
  - Jūryō Champion: Hisanohama Keita (11–4)
- Ryōgoku Kokugikan, Tokyo, May 7–21
  - Makuuchi Champion: Hokutoumi Nobuyoshi (13–2, 5th)
  - Jūryō Champion: Hisanohama Keita (10–5)
- Aichi Prefectural Gymnasium, Nagoya, July 2–16
  - Makuuchi Champion: Chiyonofuji Mitsugu (12–3, 28th)
  - Jūryō Champion: Tochitsukasa Tetsushi (12–3)
- Ryōgoku Kokugikan, Tokyo, September 10–24
  - Makuuchi Champion: Chiyonofuji Mitsugu (15–0, 29th)
  - Jūryō Champion: Ryūkōzan Kazuto (10–5)
- Fukuoka International Center, Kyushu, November 12–26
  - Makuuchi Champion: Konishiki Yasokichi (14–1, 1st)
  - Jūryō Champion: Oginohana Shōwa (13–2)

== News ==
=== January ===
- Emperor Shōwa died on January 7 and the New Year basho was postponed by one day. During the January tournament, the distribution of prize money envelopes and sponsorship prizes were cancelled, the music band and bow-twirling ceremony on the final day were also called off, and post-tournament parties in each stable were discouraged.
- Former maegashira Takeyama retired and took the elder name Nakagawa. Chiyonofuji received the Pro Sports Grand Prize.

=== February ===
- NHK's Broadcasting Culture Award was presented to Director-Chairman Futagoyama. Former maegashira Hidanohana retired and assumed the elder name Onoue.

=== April ===
- The Sumo Training Institute held a referee training seminar.

=== June ===
- Former komusubi Kananoumi retired and became Hanakago Oyakata.
- On June 19, Miyagino Oyakata (former komusubi Hirokawa) died at age 52; Nakagawa Oyakata succeeded him as head of the Miyagino stable.

=== July ===
- At the Nagoya basho, the first-ever playoff between two yokozuna from the same stable took place.
- Former sekiwake Masudayama retired and succeeded to the elder name Chiganoura.

=== August ===
- On August 15, former ōzeki Minemayama died at age 67.

=== September ===
- On Day 13 of the September basho, Chiyonofuji set a record with his 965th career win, the most ever at that time.
- Former sekiwake Kuranohana retired and took the elder name Shibatayama.
- On September 29, Chiyonofuji was awarded the People's Honour Award. The board also approved granting him a one-generation elder stock, which he declined.

=== November ===
- Newly promoted jūryō wrestler Takanohana, at 17 years 2 months, became the youngest sekitori in history.

== Deaths ==
- 7 January: Wakakuni Kazuo (former jūryō 11, born 1927)
- 19 June: Hirokawa Taizō (former komusubi, born 1937)
- 24 July: Utagawa Katsutarō (former maegashira 3, born 1939)
- 15 August: Minemayama Takashi (former ōzeki, born 1922)
- 20 August: Tenryū Saburō (former sekiwake, born 1903)
- 18 October: Tsurumiyama Yūhiro (former jūryō 16, born 1924)
- 20 October: Akasegawa Denshirō (former maegashira 13, born 1918)
- 10 November: Ayawake Shin'sei (former maegashira 5, born 1909)

== See also ==
- Glossary of sumo terms
- List of years in sumo
