= Kazutaka =

- Gender: Male

Origin
- Origin: Japanese
- Meaning: Different meanings depending on the kanji used

Kazutaka (written: 一貴, 一宇, 一孝, 和隆 or 教隆) is a masculine Japanese given name. Notable people with the name include:

- Kazutaka Kogi (born 1933), Japanese academic
- Kazutaka Komori (小森 一孝; 1943–1971), Japanese ultra-nationalist and murderer
- Kazutaka Miyatake (宮武 一貴; born 1949), Japanese mechanical designer
- Kazutaka Murase (村瀬 和隆; born 1985), Japanese footballer
- Naminohana Kazutaka (浪之花 教隆; born 1969), Japanese sumo wrestler
- Kazutaka Nishiyama (西山 一宇; born 1970), Japanese baseball player

== See also ==
- 8087 Kazutaka, a main-belt asteroid
