= Kyokudōzan Kazuyasu =

Japanese sumo wrestler and politician

- 旭道山 和泰

Member of the House of Representatives
- In office 20 October 1996 – 2 June 2000
- Preceded by: Constituency established
- Succeeded by: Multi-member district
- Constituency: Kinki PR

Personal details
- Born: Kazuyasu Hato; 14 October 1964 (age 62) Setagaya, Tokyo, Japan
- Party: Independent
- Other political affiliations: NFP (1996–1998); Komeito (1998–2000)
- Education: Kametsu Junior High School

Kyokudōzan Kazuyasu (旭道山 和泰) (born 14 October 1964 as Kazuyasu Hato) is a former sumo wrestler and politician from Kagoshima Prefecture, Japan. He began his sumo career in 1980, reaching the top division in 1989. He was one of the lightest men in makuuchi, but he nevertheless reached the fourth highest rank of komusubi and won four special prizes. After retiring in 1996 he was elected to the Japanese Diet, serving until 2000. He is now a businessman.

== Sumo career ==
Kyokudōzan Kazuyasu
Personal information
- Height: 1.82 m (5 ft 11 1/2 in)
- Weight: 102 kg (225 lb)

Sport
- Sport: Sumo
- Retired: November, 1996
- Heya: Ōshima
- Record: 537-549-0
- Debut: May, 1980
- Highest rank: Komusubi (September, 1992)
- Championships: 1 (Jonokuchi)
- Special Prizes: Outstanding Performance (2); Fighting Spirit (2)
- Gold Stars: 1 (Akebono)
- Updated on July 2007

Kyokudozan was born in Tokyo, but moved to his mother's hometown of Tokunoshima in Ōshima District as a child. In high school he was offered a volleyball scholarship, but he opted for sumo. He joined the newly formed Ōshima stable, making his professional debut in May 1980. He was one of the lightest sumo wrestlers ever, capable of running the 100 metres in 11 seconds. He did not reach 100 kg in weight until 1989, the year he was promoted to the top makuuchi division. Kyokudozan stayed in the top division for 48 tournaments. Mainoumi was the only makuuchi wrestler lighter than himself during this period. In May 1992 he defeated ōzeki Konishiki, winner of the previous tournament and some 150 kg heavier than him, with the rare leg-sweeping technique ketaguri. In September 1992 he reached his highest rank of komusubi. Unusually for someone making their san'yaku debut he was able to hold his rank. For this he was awarded the Kantō-shō, or Fighting Spirit prize. In March 1993 he defeated the newly crowned Yokozuna Akebono to earn his only kinboshi.

== Political career ==
In October 1996 Kyokudozan submitted his retirement papers to the Sumo Association and announced he would run for election to the Diet of Japan. He stood for the New Frontier Party and was elected to the lower House of Representatives, representing the Kansai region. When his party was disbanded he joined the New Peace Party (now New Komeito) before continuing as an independent. In May 2000 he announced he would not stand in the next general election and was retiring from politics.

== Later career ==
Kyokudozan subsequently moved to Osaka, where he set up a business, running a health food company. He was also involved in local politics in the area. In 2008 he attended the retirement ceremony of former stablemate Kyokutenzan. He also occasionally commentates on sumo broadcasts. His younger brother remains in sumo, as a gyōji or referee, and is known as Kimura Hisanosuke. He is affiliated to Ōshima stable and referees at sanyaku level.

== Fighting style ==
Despite his light weight Kyokudozan preferred yotsu-sumo techniques, fighting his opponent at close quarters on the mawashi. His favourite grip was migi-yotsu, with his left hand outside and right hand inside his opponent's arms. His most common winning kimarite was yorikiri (force out), but he also regularly used his left hand grip to win with uwatenage, or outer arm throw.

== Career record ==
Kyokudozan Kazuyasu
Year	January Hatsu basho, Tokyo	March Haru basho, Osaka	May Natsu basho, Tokyo	July Nagoya basho, Nagoya	September Aki basho, Tokyo	November Kyūshū basho, Fukuoka
1980	x	x	(Maezumo)	West Jonokuchi #36; 7–0; Champion	East Jonidan #69; 2–5	West Jonidan #88; 6–1
1981	West Jonidan #22; 3–4	West Jonidan #36; 4–3	East Jonidan #21; 5–2	East Sandanme #75; 4–3	West Sandanme #61; 4–3	West Sandanme #49; 3–4
1982	West Sandanme #60; 2–5	West Sandanme #84; 4–3	West Sandanme #72; 4–3	East Sandanme #54; 3–4	East Sandanme #69; 4–3	West Sandanme #44; 5–2
1983	East Sandanme #14; 1–6	West Sandanme #50; 3–4	East Sandanme #68; 2–5	East Jonidan #5; 5–2	East Sandanme #64; 6–1	East Sandanme #15; 2–5
1984	West Sandanme #37; 5–2	East Sandanme #6; 2–5	West Sandanme #30; 5–2	West Makushita #58; 3–4	East Sandanme #11; 5–2	East Makushita #42; 3–4
1985	West Makushita #55; 3–4	East Sandanme #7; 5–2	East Makushita #45; 4–3	East Makushita #32; 4–3	West Makushita #24; 5–2	East Makushita #11; 3–4
1986	West Makushita #21; 3–4	East Makushita #32; 4–3	East Makushita #22; 4–3	East Makushita #16; 4–3	East Makushita #11; 4–3	West Makushita #5; 4–3
1987	West Makushita #2; 2–5	East Makushita #14; 3–4	West Makushita #19; 4–3	East Makushita #13; 4–3	East Makushita #8; 5–2	West Makushita #2; 2–5
1988	West Makushita #16; 4–3	West Makushita #10; 5–2	West Makushita #4; 6–1	West Jūryō #12; 10–5–P	West Jūryō #5; 8–7	East Jūryō #2; 10–5
1989	East Maegashira #12; 9–6; F	West Maegashira #5; 5–10	West Maegashira #9; 8–7	East Maegashira #7; 6–9	West Maegashira #10; 8–7	West Maegashira #6; 7–8
1990	East Maegashira #8; 8–7	West Maegashira #5; 6–9	West Maegashira #7; 5–10	East Maegashira #13; 9–6	West Maegashira #8; 6–9	West Maegashira #11; 8–7
1991	West Maegashira #7; 8–7	East Maegashira #3; 5–10	West Maegashira #10; 8–7	East Maegashira #7; 8–7	West Maegashira #4; 6–9	West Maegashira #8; 8–7
1992	East Maegashira #6; 7–8	West Maegashira #8; 8–7	East Maegashira #6; 9–6	East Maegashira #2; 9–6; O	East Komusubi #2; 8–7; F	West Komusubi #1; 4–11
1993	West Maegashira #6; 8–7	East Maegashira #2; 9–6; O★	West Komusubi #1; 4–11	West Maegashira #3; 4–11	East Maegashira #11; 8–7	West Maegashira #7; 6–9
1994	East Maegashira #10; 8–7	East Maegashira #4; 5–10	West Maegashira #9; 8–7	West Maegashira #3; 5–10	East Maegashira #7; 8–7	West Maegashira #2; 2–13
1995	East Maegashira #12; 8–7	West Maegashira #8; 6–9	West Maegashira #11; 8–7	East Maegashira #8; 5–10	East Maegashira #14; 9–6	East Maegashira #7; 4–11
1996	West Maegashira #15; 9–6	East Maegashira #7; 5–10	West Maegashira #13; 9–6	East Maegashira #12; 8–7	East Maegashira #9; 6–9	West Maegashira #14; Retired; 0–0
Record given as wins–losses–absences Top division champion Top division runner-up Retired Lower divisions Non-participation Sanshō key: F=Fighting spirit; O=Outstanding performance; T=Technique Also shown: ★=Kinboshi; P=Playoff(s); Divisions: Makuuchi — Jūryō — Makushita — Sandanme — Jonidan — Jonokuchi Makuuchi ranks: Yokozuna — Ōzeki — Sekiwake — Komusubi — Maegashira

== See also ==
- Glossary of sumo terms
- List of past sumo wrestlers
- List of komusubi
