= Kotobeppu Yōhei =

Japanese sumo wrestler (born 1965)

Kotobeppu Yohei
Personal information
- Native name: 琴別府 要平
- Born: Yohei Miura; 17 October 1965 (age 61) Beppu, Ōita, Japan
- Height: 1.78 m (5 ft 10 in)
- Weight: 183 kg (403 lb)

Sport
- Sport: Sumo
- Retired: November, 1997
- Heya: Sadogatake
- Record: 457-433-82
- Debut: March, 1981
- Highest rank: Maegashira 1 (March, 1995)
- Championships: 1 (Jūryō); 2 (Makushita); 1 (Jonidan)
- Special Prizes: Fighting Spirit (1)
- Updated on August 2012

Kotobeppu Yōhei (born 17 October 1965 as Yōhei Miura) is a former sumo wrestler from Beppu, Ōita, Japan. In March 1981, he made his professional debut and he reached the jūryō division in July 1989, but had to withdraw in his jūryō debut because of nephritis and a long absence from competition due to uremia saw him fall greatly in rank. During this time he was close to requiring dialysis but eventually made a full recovery. He reached the top division in November 1992, becoming the first former sekitori to fall to the lowest jonokuchi division and subsequently manage to reach the top division. The only other wrestler to achieve this feat as of January 2018 is Ryūden. A previous member of Sadogatake stable, former ōzeki Kotokaze, had fallen from sekiwake to makushita and had been referred to as "the man who saw hell" and after Kotobeppu's even bigger fall he was called, "the man who saw the new hell." Kotobeppu received the Fighting Spirit Prize for winning ten bouts in his top division debut. His highest rank was maegashira 1. He retired in November 1997. He trained as a ramen maker and opened a ramen restaurant in Chiba Prefecture and later in his hometown of Beppu, Ōita where he also served chankonabe.

== Career record ==
Kotobeppu Yōhei
Year	January Hatsu basho, Tokyo	March Haru basho, Osaka	May Natsu basho, Tokyo	July Nagoya basho, Nagoya	September Aki basho, Tokyo	November Kyūshū basho, Fukuoka
1981	x	(Maezumo)	East Jonokuchi #49; 5–2	East Jonidan #126; 3–4	West Jonidan #140; 3–4	East Jonokuchi #1; 5–2
1982	West Jonidan #97; 3–4	West Jonidan #115; 3–4	West Jonidan #128; 5–2	West Jonidan #88; 3–4	East Jonidan #105; 5–2	West Jonidan #65; 5–2
1983	East Jonidan #22; 3–4	West Jonidan #38; 2–5	West Jonidan #66; 3–4	East Jonidan #85; 6–1	West Jonidan #19; 4–3	West Jonidan #2; 3–4
1984	East Jonidan #8; 4–3	East Sandanme #87; 1–6	East Jonidan #21; 5–2	West Sandanme #85; 6–1	West Sandanme #36; 2–5	East Sandanme #66; 2–5
1985	East Sandanme #100; 6–1	East Sandanme #51; 2–5	East Sandanme #81; 6–1	East Sandanme #34; 3–4	East Sandanme #48; 4–3	East Sandanme #29; 4–3
1986	East Sandanme #8; 3–4	West Sandanme #25; 4–3	West Sandanme #8; 1–6	West Sandanme #51; 6–1	East Sandanme #4; 4–3	East Makushita #49; 5–2
1987	East Makushita #33; 4–3	East Makushita #26; 3–4	East Makushita #36; 4–3	West Makushita #25; 7–0; Champion	East Makushita #5; 1–6	East Makushita #29; 5–2
1988	West Makushita #14; 5–2	East Makushita #5; 3–4	West Makushita #10; 3–4	East Makushita #18; 6–1	East Makushita #5; 2–5	West Makushita #20; 7–0; Champion
1989	East Makushita #4; 4–3	West Makushita #1; 3–4	East Makushita #4; 6–1	West Jūryō #12; 1–7–7	West Makushita #12; Sat out due to injury 0–0–7	West Makushita #52; Sat out due to injury 0–0–7
1990	East Sandanme #33; Sat out due to injury 0–0–7	West Sandanme #93; Sat out due to injury 0–0–7	East Jonidan #53; Sat out due to injury 0–0–7	West Jonidan #123; Sat out due to injury 0–0–7	West Jonokuchi #39; 6–1	West Jonidan #90; 7–0–P; Champion
1991	East Sandanme #80; 6–1	East Sandanme #28; 6–1	East Makushita #51; 6–1	East Makushita #24; 6–1	East Makushita #9; 3–4	East Makushita #15; 4–3
1992	East Makushita #12; 6–1	East Makushita #2; 4–2–1	West Jūryō #13; Sat out due to injury 0–0–15	West Jūryō #13; 10–5	West Jūryō #5; 12–3; Champion	West Maegashira #14; 10–5; F
1993	West Maegashira #9; 8–6–1	West Maegashira #5; Sat out due to injury 0–0–15	West Maegashira #5; 5–10	East Maegashira #12; 9–6	West Maegashira #3; 5–10	West Maegashira #8; 8–7
1994	West Maegashira #2; 3–12	West Maegashira #12; 9–6	East Maegashira #6; 6–9	East Maegashira #11; 8–7	West Maegashira #7; 8–7	East Maegashira #4; 5–10
1995	West Maegashira #9; 9–6	East Maegashira #1; 3–12	West Maegashira #9; 8–7	West Maegashira #2; 4–11	West Maegashira #6; 6–9	East Maegashira #9; 8–7
1996	West Maegashira #5; 4–11	West Maegashira #12; 8–7	East Maegashira #7; 6–9	East Maegashira #10; 9–6	West Maegashira #3; 3–12	East Maegashira #12; 7–8
1997	East Maegashira #16; 5–10	West Jūryō #3; 7–8	East Jūryō #5; 5–10	East Jūryō #10; 6–9	West Jūryō #13; 4–11	East Makushita #6; Retired; 2–4–1
Record given as wins–losses–absences Top division champion Top division runner-up Retired Lower divisions Non-participation Sanshō key: F=Fighting spirit; O=Outstanding performance; T=Technique Also shown: ★=Kinboshi; P=Playoff(s); Divisions: Makuuchi — Jūryō — Makushita — Sandanme — Jonidan — Jonokuchi Makuuchi ranks: Yokozuna — Ōzeki — Sekiwake — Komusubi — Maegashira

== See also ==
- Glossary of sumo terms
- List of sumo tournament second division champions
