= Naminohana Kazutaka =

Sumo wrestler

Personal information
- Native name: 浪之花 教隆
- Born: Kazuhiro Kudo; 19 March 1969 (age 57) Namioka, Aomori, Japan
- Height: 1.79 m (5 ft 10 1/2 in)
- Weight: 130 kg (290 lb)

Sport
- Sport: Sumo
- Retired: March, 1997
- Heya: Futagoyama
- Record: 423-402-10
- Debut: May, 1984
- Highest rank: Komusubi (March, 1995)
- Championships: 2 (Jūryō)
- Special Prizes: Fighting Spirit (1)
- Updated on August 2012

Naminohana Kazutaka (born 19 March 1969 as Kazuhiro Kudo) is a former sumo wrestler from Namioka, Aomori, Japan. He was active from 1984 until 1997 and his highest rank was komusubi. He fought for Futagoyama stable and won one special prize for Fighting Spirit. After retiring at age 28 because of injury he went into the restaurant business.

== Career ==
He was born in Namioka, Aomori, the third son of a farmer. He won a sumo competition at Namioka Tachi Nozawa Elementary School and fought for the fourth grade sumo club even when still in the third grade. At junior high he moved away from sumo and was thinking of becoming a physical education teacher. However he was recruited by the former yokozuna Wakanohana Kanji I and joined his Futagoyama stable upon graduation from junior high school. Initially fighting under his own surname of Kudo, he made his professional debut in May 1984. Weighing less than 100 kilograms (220 lb) early in his career he rose rather slowly up the ranks, but he compensated for his lack of physique by hard training. He was promoted to the second highest juryo division in November 1990 and reached the top makuuchi division for the first time in September 1992. After falling back to juryo in 1994 he won two yusho or tournament championships in that division. Upon his return to makuuchi in November 1994 he scored 10–5 and won his first and only sansho, for Fighting Spirit. He was nominated for the prize on the condition that he win on the final day, and had he failed to do so, there would have been no sansho at all awarded in a tournament for the first time since they were introduced in 1947. His highest rank was komusubi, which he held for one tournament in March 1995 after a 9–6 record at maegashira 7 in the previous tournament saw him somewhat fortuitously promoted to the sanyaku ranks. He scored only 6–9 and never made komusubi again. He injured his elbow in a match with Kaio in March 1996, which restricted his performances and led to six consecutive losing records and demotion to the makushita division.

He is the only wrestler in modern sumo to reach a sanyaku rank but never defeat any yokozuna or ozeki in his career. He was only eligible to face Akebono and Musashimaru during his 18 tournament stay in the top division as the other yokozuna and ozeki were all fellow members of Futagoyama stable, and sumo rules prevent wrestlers from the same stable meeting in competition.

== Retirement from sumo ==
He retired in March 1997 at the age of 28. He had no elder stock in the Japan Sumo Association and so was unable to stay in sumo. He ran a restaurant in Nishi-Azabu, Tokyo and has appeared on J Sports ESPN's Genshiko Ozumu sumo program.

== Fighting style ==
Naminohana was an oshi-sumo specialist who preferred to push and thrust rather than go for a grip on the mawashi or belt. His most common winning kimarite or techniques were oshi-dashi (push out), yori-kiri (force out), hataki-komi (slap down) and tsuki-otoshi (thrust over).

He was known for trying to tempt his opponent to begin the bout early, a practice known as jikanmae.

== Career record ==
Naminohana Kazutaka
Year	January Hatsu basho, Tokyo	March Haru basho, Osaka	May Natsu basho, Tokyo	July Nagoya basho, Nagoya	September Aki basho, Tokyo	November Kyūshū basho, Fukuoka
1984	x	x	(Maezumo)	West Jonokuchi #50; 4–3	East Jonokuchi #9; 3–4	East Jonokuchi #16; 5–2
1985	East Jonidan #107; 3–4	West Jonidan #119; 6–1	East Jonidan #49; 4–3	East Jonidan #24; 5–2	West #88; 2–5	East Jonidan #12; 3–4
1986	West Jonidan #27; 6–1	West Sandanme #69; 3–4	East Sandanme #83; 6–1	West Sandanme #28; 2–5	West Sandanme #56; 4–3	East Sandanme #39; 5–2
1987	West Sandanme #13; 2–5	West Sandanme #34; 4–3	East Sandanme #20; 5–2	East Makushita #58; 2–5	West Sandanme #23; 3–4	East Sandanme #39; 5–2
1988	East Sandanme #15; 4–3	West Sandanme #1; 5–2	East Makushita #42; 6–1	West Makushita #20; 2–5	West Makushita #39; 5–2	West Makushita #22; 2–5
1989	West Makushita #41; 6–1	East Makushita #19; 4–3	West Makushita #12; 5–2	East Makushita #4; 0–3–4	West Makushita #39; 3–4	West Makushita #51; 5–2
1990	West Makushita #34; 4–3	West Makushita #27; 4–3	West Makushita #16; 6–1–P	West Makushita #4; 4–3	East Makushita #3; 5–2	East Jūryō #12; 10–5
1991	West Jūryō #4; 5–10	West Jūryō #10; 6–9	West Jūryō #12; 8–7	West Jūryō #8; 6–9	West Jūryō #9; 5–10	West Makushita #2; 5–2
1992	West Jūryō #11; 10–5	West Jūryō #6; 9–6	East Jūryō #2; 6–9	West Jūryō #4; 10–5	East Maegashira #15; 6–9	West Jūryō #1; 10–5
1993	East Maegashira #14; 10–5	East Maegashira #7; 5–10	West Maegashira #13; 4–11	East Jūryō #5; 9–6	West Jūryō #2; 8–7	West Jūryō #1; 6–9
1994	East Jūryō #6; 11–4; Champion	West Jūryō #1; 9–6	West Maegashira #15; 6–9	East Jūryō #2; 8–7	West Jūryō #1; 10–5; Champion	East Maegashira #15; 10–5; F
1995	East Maegashira #7; 9–6	East Komusubi #1; 6–9	East Maegashira #2; 6–9	West Maegashira #4; 4–11	East Maegashira #11; 8–7	East Maegashira #5; 6–9
1996	East Maegashira #9; 9–6	West Maegashira #1; 6–9	West Maegashira #3; 7–8	East Maegashira #4; 3–12	West Maegashira #11; 7–8	East Maegashira #14; 5–10
1997	East Jūryō #4; 3–12	East Makushita #1; Retired; 0–1–6	x	x	x	x
Record given as wins–losses–absences Top division champion Top division runner-up Retired Lower divisions Non-participation Sanshō key: F=Fighting spirit; O=Outstanding performance; T=Technique Also shown: ★=Kinboshi; P=Playoff(s); Divisions: Makuuchi — Jūryō — Makushita — Sandanme — Jonidan — Jonokuchi Makuuchi ranks: Yokozuna — Ōzeki — Sekiwake — Komusubi — Maegashira

== See also ==
- List of sumo tournament second division champions
- Glossary of sumo terms
- List of past sumo wrestlers
- List of komusubi
