= 1994 in sumo =

In 1994, Takanohana won two successive tournaments, unbeaten (15–0), earning promotion to the highest rank of yokozuna, or grand champion, in November. At the Nagoya tournament in July, ōzeki Musashimaru had won his first championship, also unbeaten (15–0), leading to speculation that he could become the next foreign-born sumo wrestler to be promoted to sumo's highest rank.

The following are the events in professional sumo in Japan during 1994.

== Tournaments ==
=== Hatsu basho ===
Ryōgoku Kokugikan, Tokyo, 9 January – 23 January

1994 Hatsu basho results - Makuuchi Division
W		L		A	East			Rank	West			W		L		A
11	-	4	-	0		(United States)	**Akebono**	Y	ø							
11	-	4	-	0		(Japan)	**Wakanohana**	O		(Japan)	**Takanohana**	14	-	1	-	0
12	-	3	-	0		(United States)	**Musashimaru**	S		(Japan)	**Takanonami**	13	-	2	-	0
9	-	6	-	0		(Japan)	**Kotonishiki**	HD		(United States)	Konishiki	2	-	13	-	0
4	-	11	-	0		(Japan)	Tomonohana	K		(Japan)	Wakashoyo	6	-	9	-	0
6	-	9	-	0		(Japan)	Kotonowaka	M1		(Japan)	**Tochinowaka**	8	-	7	-	0
4	-	11	-	0		(Japan)	Akinoshima	M2		(Japan)	Kotobeppu	3	-	12	-	0
8	-	7	-	0	ø	(Japan)	**Daizen**	M3		(Japan)	**Musōyama**	10	-	5	-	0
8	-	7	-	0		(Japan)	**Misugisato**	M4		(Japan)	Kotofuji	3	-	12	-	0
7	-	8	-	0		(Japan)	Oginishiki	M5	ø	(Japan)	Daishōhō	0	-	0	-	15
6	-	9	-	0		(Japan)	Kenkō	M6		(Japan)	**Kaiō**	8	-	7	-	0
6	-	9	-	0		(Japan)	Takatōriki	M7	ø	(Japan)	Kushimaumi	1	-	2	-	12
8	-	7	-	0		(Japan)	**Terao**	M8		(Japan)	**Kitakachidoki**	8	-	7	-	0
6	-	9	-	0		(Japan)	Kiraihō	M9		(Japan)	Tamakairiki	2	-	13	-	0
8	-	7	-	0		(Japan)	**Kyokudōzan**	M10		(Japan)	**Takamisugi**	8	-	7	-	0
8	-	7	-	0		(Japan)	**Mitoizumi**	M11		(Japan)	Toyonoumi	6	-	9	-	0
8	-	7	-	0		(Japan)	**Mainoumi**	M12		(Japan)	**Kotoinazuma**	8	-	7	-	0
8	-	7	-	0		(Japan)	**Higonoumi**	M13		(Japan)	**Kasugafuji**	9	-	6	-	0
8	-	7	-	0		(Japan)	**Hamanoshima**	M14		(Japan)	**Kirishima**	8	-	7	-	0
9	-	6	-	0		(Japan)	**Daishōyama**	M15		(Japan)	**Tokitsunada**	9	-	6	-	0
7	-	8	-	0		(Japan)	Kototsubaki	M16	ø							

ø - Indicates a pull-out or absent rank
**winning record in bold**
**Yusho Winner**

=== Haru basho ===
Osaka Prefectural Gymnasium, Osaka, 13 March – 27 March

1994 Haru basho results - Makuuchi Division
W		L		A	East		Rank	West			W		L		A
12	-	3	-	0	(United States)	**Akebono***	Y	ø							
11	-	4	-	0	(Japan)	**Takanohana**	O	ø	(Japan)	Wakanohana	3	-	4	-	8
12	-	3	-	0	(Japan)	**Takanonami**	HD		(United States)	**Musashimaru**	9	-	6	-	0
10	-	5	-	0	(Japan)	**Kotonishiki**	S		(United States)	**Musōyama**	9	-	6	-	0
3	-	12	-	0	(Japan)	Tochinowaka	K		(Japan)	Daizen	5	-	10	-	0
6	-	9	-	0	(Japan)	Misugisato	M1		(Japan)	**Kaiō**	9	-	6	-	0
4	-	11	-	0	(Japan)	Wakashoyo	M2		(Japan)	**Terao**	9	-	6	-	0
7	-	8	-	0	(Japan)	Kotonowaka	M3		(Japan)	Kitakachidoki	6	-	9	-	0
5	-	10	-	0	(Japan)	Kyokudōzan	M4	ø	(Japan)	Takamisugi	5	-	10	-	0
6	-	9	-	0	(Japan)	Tomonohana	M5		(Japan)	Daishōhō	3	-	12	-	0
9	-	6	-	0	(Japan)	**Oginishiki**	M6		(Japan)	Mitoizumi	4	-	11	-	0
7	-	8	-	0	(Japan)	Kasugafuji	M7		(Japan)	Mainoumi	6	-	9	-	0
6	-	9	-	0	(Japan)	Kotoinazuma	M8		(Japan)	**Higonoumi**	9	-	6	-	0
8	-	7	-	0	(United States)	**Konishiki**	M9		(Japan)	**Kenkō**	9	-	6	-	0
9	-	6	-	0	(Japan)	**Akinoshima**	M10	ø	(Japan)	Daishōyama	3	-	11	-	1
8	-	7	-	0	(Japan)	**Tokitsunada**	M11		(Japan)	**Hamanoshima**	8	-	7	-	0
12	-	3	-	0	(Japan)	**Takatōriki**	M12		(Japan)	**Kotobeppu**	9	-	6	-	0
8	-	7	-	0	(Japan)	**Kirishima**	M13		(Japan)	**Kiraihō**	9	-	6	-	0
8	-	7	-	0	(Japan)	**Kotofuji**	M14		(Japan)	Toyonoumi	6	-	9	-	0
9	-	6	-	0	(Japan)	**Asanowaka**	M15		(Japan)	**Kotogaume**	8	-	7	-	0
4	-	11	-	0	(Japan)	Aogiyama	M16	ø							

ø - Indicates a pull-out or absent rank
**winning record in bold**
**Yusho Winner**
***Won Playoff**

=== Natsu basho ===
Ryōgoku Kokugikan, Tokyo, 8 May – 22 May

1994 Natsu basho results - Makuuchi Division
W		L		A	East			Rank	West			W		L		A
10	-	2	-	3	ø	(United States)	**Akebono**	Y	ø							
9	-	6	-	0		(Japan)	**Takanonami**	O		(Japan)	**Takanohana**	14	-	1	-	0
12	-	3	-	0		(United States)	**Musashimaru**	HD	ø	(Japan)	Wakanohana	0	-	0	-	15
9	-	6	-	0		(Japan)	**Kotonishiki**	S		(Japan)	**Musōyama**	9	-	6	-	0
8	-	7	-	0		(Japan)	**Kaiō**	K		(Japan)	**Terao**	8	-	7	-	0
7	-	8	-	0		(Japan)	Oginishiki	M1		(Japan)	**Takatōriki**	9	-	6	-	0
4	-	11	-	0		(Japan)	Higonoumi	M2		(Japan)	Kenkō	4	-	11	-	0
3	-	12	-	0		(Japan)	Akinoshima	M3		(Japan)	Kotonowaka	5	-	10	-	0
6	-	9	-	0		(Japan)	Misugisato	M4		(Japan)	Daizen	7	-	8	-	0
5	-	10	-	0		(United States)	Konishiki	M5		(Japan)	Kitakachidoki	6	-	9	-	0
6	-	9	-	0		(Japan)	Kotobeppu	M6		(Japan)	Tokitsunada	5	-	10	-	0
7	-	8	-	0		(Japan)	Kiraihō	M7		(Japan)	**Tochinowaka**	8	-	7	-	0
8	-	7	-	0		(Japan)	**Hamanoshima**	M8		(Japan)	**Tomonohana**	8	-	7	-	0
8	-	7	-	0		(Japan)	**Kasugafuji**	M9		(Japan)	**Kyokudōzan**	8	-	7	-	0
2	-	13	-	0		(Japan)	Wakashoyo	M10		(Japan)	Takamisugi	7	-	8	-	0
8	-	7	-	0		(Japan)	**Asanowaka**	M11		(Japan)	**Kirishima**	8	-	7	-	0
9	-	6	-	0		(Japan)	**Mainoumi**	M12		(Japan)	**Kotofuji**	9	-	6	-	0
8	-	7	-	0		(Japan)	**Kotoinazuma**	M13		(Japan)	**Kotogaume**	8	-	7	-	0
8	-	7	-	0		(Japan)	**Mitoizumi**	M14		(Japan)	**Daishōhō**	9	-	6	-	0
9	-	6	-	0		(Japan)	**Minatofuji**	M15		(Japan)	Naminohana	6	-	9	-	0
5	-	10	-	0		(Japan)	Asahisato	M16	ø							

ø - Indicates a pull-out or absent rank
**winning record in bold**
**Yusho Winner**

=== Nagoya basho ===
Aichi Prefectural Gymnasium, Nagoya, 3 July – 17 July

1994 Nagoya basho results - Makuuchi Division
W		L		A	East			Rank	West			W		L		A
0	-	0	-	15	ø	(United States)	Akebono	HD	ø							
11	-	4	-	0		(Japan)	**Takanohana**	O		(United States)	**Musashimaru**	15	-	0	-	0
12	-	3	-	0		(Japan)	**Takanonami**	O		(Japan)	**Wakanohana**	14	-	1	-	0
3	-	12	-	0		(Japan)	Kotonishiki	S		(Japan)	**Musōyama**	8	-	7	-	0
5	-	10	-	0		(Japan)	Kaiō	K		(Japan)	Terao	4	-	11	-	0
					ø			K		(Japan)	**Takatōriki**	10	-	5	-	0
5	-	10	-	0		(Japan)	Tochinowaka	M1		(Japan)	Oginishiki	4	-	11	-	0
8	-	7	-	0		(Japan)	**Hamanoshima**	M2		(Japan)	Tomonohana	6	-	9	-	0
5	-	10	-	0		(Japan)	Kasugafuji	M3		(Japan)	Kyokudōzan	5	-	10	-	0
9	-	6	-	0		(Japan)	**Mainoumi**	M4		(Japan)	Kotofuji	4	-	11	-	0
6	-	9	-	0		(Japan)	Daizen	M5		(Japan)	Asanowaka	6	-	9	-	0
7	-	8	-	0		(Japan)	Kirishima	M6		(Japan)	**Misugisato**	8	-	7	-	0
8	-	7	-	0		(Japan)	**Kotonowaka**	M7		(Japan)	Daishōhō	6	-	9	-	0
7	-	8	-	0		(Japan)	Kitakachidoki	M8		(Japan)	Kiraihō	7	-	8	-	0
6	-	9	-	0		(Japan)	Minatofuji	M9		(Japan)	**Higonoumi**	8	-	7	-	0
8	-	7	-	0		(Japan)	**Kotoinazuma**	M10		(Japan)	**Kenkō**	9	-	6	-	0
8	-	7	-	0		(Japan)	**Kotobeppu**	M11		(Japan)	Kotogaume	7	-	8	-	0
9	-	6	-	0		(United States)	**Konishiki**	M12		(Japan)	**Takamisugi**	9	-	6	-	0
8	-	7	-	0		(Japan)	**Mitoizumi**	M13		(Japan)	**Tokitsunada**	8	-	7	-	0
8	-	7	-	0		(Japan)	**Akinoshima**	M14		(Japan)	Oginohana	7	-	8	-	0
8	-	7	-	0		(Japan)	**Daishi**	M15		(Japan)	**Kushimaumi**	8	-	7	-	0

ø - Indicates a pull-out or absent rank
**winning record in bold**
**Yusho Winner**

=== Aki basho ===
Ryōgoku Kokugikan, Tokyo, 11 September – 25 September

1994 Aki basho results - Makuuchi Division
W		L		A	East			Rank	West			W		L		A
0	-	0	-	15	ø	(United States)	Akebono	HD	ø							
11	-	4	-	0		(United States)	**Musashimaru**	O		(Japan)	**Wakanohana**	12	-	3	-	0
12	-	3	-	0		(Japan)	**Takanonami**	O		(Japan)	**Takanohana**	15	-	0	-	0
13	-	2	-	0		(Japan)	**Musōyama**	S		(Japan)	**Takatōriki**	8	-	7	-	0
2	-	13	-	0		(Japan)	Mainoumi	K		(Japan)	Hamanoshima	6	-	9	-	0
6	-	9	-	0		(Japan)	Misugisato	M1		(Japan)	Kotonowaka	7	-	8	-	0
9	-	6	-	0		(Japan)	**Kaiō**	M2		(Japan)	Kenkō	4	-	11	-	0
4	-	11	-	0		(Japan)	Terao	M3		(Japan)	**Kotonishiki**	8	-	7	-	0
4	-	11	-	0		(Japan)	Tomonohana	M4		(Japan)	Higonoumi	6	-	9	-	0
8	-	7	-	0		(Japan)	**Kotoinazuma**	M5		(Japan)	Tochinowaka	6	-	9	-	0
6	-	9	-	0		(Japan)	Takamisugi	M6		(Japan)	Kasugafuji	6	-	9	-	0
8	-	7	-	0		(Japan)	**Kyokudōzan**	M7		(Japan)	**Kotobeppu**	8	-	7	-	0
5	-	10	-	0		(Japan)	Oginishiki	M8		(Japan)	Kirishima	7	-	8	-	0
9	-	6	-	0		(Japan)	**Daizen**	M9		(Japan)	Asanowaka	7	-	8	-	0
8	-	7	-	0		(United States)	**Konishiki**	M10		(Japan)	Kitakachidoki	7	-	8	-	0
7	-	8	-	0		(Japan)	Kiraihō	M11		(Japan)	Mitoizumi	7	-	8	-	0
4	-	11	-	0		(Japan)	Kotofuji	M12		(Japan)	**Tokitsunada**	8	-	7	-	0
8	-	7	-	0		(Japan)	**Daishōhō**	M13		(Japan)	**Akinoshima**	11	-	4	-	0
5	-	10	-	0		(Japan)	Kotogaume	M14		(Japan)	**Daishi**	9	-	6	-	0
8	-	7	-	0		(Japan)	**Kushimaumi**	M15		(Japan)	**Minatofuji**	8	-	7	-	0
7	-	8	-	0		(Japan)	Wakanoyama	M16	ø							

ø - Indicates a pull-out or absent rank
**winning record in bold**
**Yusho Winner**

=== Kyushu basho ===
Fukuoka International Centre, Kyushu, 6 November – 20 November

1994 Kyushu basho results - Makuuchi Division
W		L		A	East		Rank	West			W		L		A
10	-	5	-	0	(United States)	**Akebono**	HD	ø							
15	-	0	-	0	(Japan)	**Takanohana**	O		(Japan)	**Wakanohana**	8	-	7	-	0
12	-	3	-	0	(Japan)	**Takanonami**	O		(United States)	**Musashimaru**	12	-	3	-	0
7	-	8	-	0	(Japan)	Musōyama	S		(Japan)	Takatōriki	6	-	9	-	0
8	-	7	-	0	(Japan)	**Kaiō**	K		(Japan)	**Kotonishiki**	8	-	7	-	0
5	-	10	-	0	(Japan)	Kotoinazuma	M1		(Japan)	Hamanoshima	6	-	9	-	0
8	-	7	-	0	(Japan)	**Kotonowaka**	M2		(Japan)	Kyokudōzan	2	-	13	-	0
6	-	9	-	0	(Japan)	Daizen	M3		(Japan)	Misugisato	5	-	10	-	0
5	-	10	-	0	(Japan)	Kotobeppu	M4		(Japan)	**Akinoshima**	10	-	5	-	0
6	-	9	-	0	(United States)	Konishiki	M5	ø	(Japan)	Tokitsunada	2	-	10	-	3
6	-	9	-	0	(Japan)	Daishi	M6		(Japan)	Higonoumi	4	-	11	-	0
6	-	9	-	0	(Japan)	Daishōhō	M7		(Japan)	**Tochinowaka**	8	-	7	-	0
8	-	7	-	0	(Japan)	**Mainoumi**	M8		(Japan)	**Kenkō**	8	-	7	-	0
8	-	7	-	0	(Japan)	**Kushimaumi**	M9		(Japan)	**Terao**	9	-	6	-	0
6	-	9	-	0	(Japan)	Minatofuji	M10		(Japan)	**Kirishima**	8	-	7	-	0
6	-	9	-	0	(Japan)	Takamisugi	M11		(Japan)	**Tomonohana**	9	-	6	-	0
8	-	7	-	0	(Japan)	**Kasugafuji**	M12		(Japan)	**Asanowaka**	8	-	7	-	0
9	-	6	-	0	(Japan)	**Kitakachidoki**	M13		(Japan)	**Kiraihō**	8	-	7	-	0
8	-	7	-	0	(Japan)	**Oginishiki**	M14		(Japan)	**Mitoizumi**	8	-	7	-	0
10	-	5	-	0	(Japan)	**Naminohana**	M15		(Japan)	Oginohana	6	-	9	-	0
5	-	10	-	0	(Japan)	Shikishima	M16	ø							

ø - Indicates a pull-out or absent rank
**winning record in bold**
**Yusho Winner**

== News ==
=== January ===
- Ōzeki Takanohana wins his fourth top division yūshō with a 14–1 score. Second and third are sekiwake Takanonami on 13–2 and Musashimaru on 12–3, who both earn promotion to ozeki after the tournament. Takanonami wins the Fighting Spirit prize, and Musashimaru the Technique Award. Musōyama wins the Outstanding Performance prize. Sekiwake Konishiki, demoted from ōzeki after six years in the previous tourney, fails in his attempt to return to the rank after turning in a disastrous 2–13 score. Naminohana wins the jūryō championship. Former maegashira Tachihikari retires.

=== March ===
- Yokozuna Akebono wins his seventh championship after a three-way playoff with Takanonami, in his ōzeki debut, and maegashira 12 Takatōriki, after all finish on 12–3. Takanohana is one behind on 11–4. Takatōriki is awarded the Fighting Spirit Prize, shared with Terao. Kaiō wins the Outstanding Performance Prize for his defeat of Akebono, while the Technique Award is shared between Kotonishiki and Oginishiki. Shikishima wins the jūryō championship.

=== May ===
- Takahanada wins his fifth championship with a 14–1 score. Musashimaru is runner-up two wins behind on 12–3. Akebono is forced to withdraw after injuring his knee in a match with Takatoriki. Terao scores eight wins on his return to the san'yaku ranks and receives the Outstanding Performance prize. Mainoumi wins his fourth Technique Prize, and Takatōriki his fifth Fighting Spirit Award. Former maegashira Oginohana wins his third jūryō championship.

=== July ===
- Musashimaru wins his first championship with a perfect 15–0 score – the first wrestler to remain unbeaten in the top division since Chiyonofuji in 1989. Fellow ōzeki Wakanohana loses only to Musashimaru and is runner-up on 14–1. Takanohana fails again in his yokozuna promotion attempt, scoring only 11–4. Akebono is out injured. Takatōriki wins his third consecutive Fighting Spirit Award after scoring 10–5 at komusubi, and Mainoumi wins his second Technique prize in a row. Hamanoshima wins the Outstanding Performance Award, and both he and Mainoumi are promoted to komusubi for the first time. The jūryō championship is won by Tatsuhikari. Enazakura retires.

=== September ===
- Takanohana wins the championship, unbeaten on 15–0. Runner-up is sekiwake Musōyama on 13–2, who receives special prizes for Outstanding Performance (shared with Kotoinazuma) and Fighting Spirit. Akebono is out once again. Naminohana wins the jūryō championship for the second time this year.

=== November ===
- Takanohana wins the championship with his second successive unbeaten score, compiling a three tournament record of 41–4. After the tournament he is promoted to yokozuna, the first Japanese to hold the rank since Hokutoumi in 1992. Despite being held at the ōzeki rank for nearly two years, he is still the third youngest yokozuna in history after Kitanoumi and Taihō. Musashimaru finishes runner-up on 12–3, while Akebono scores ten on his return. Only one special prize is awarded, to Naminohana for Fighting Spirit. Wakashoyo wins the jūryō championship after a playoff with newcomer Tosanoumi. Former maegashira Hananokuni retires.

== Deaths ==
- 9 Nov: Former maegashira Azumanishiki, aged 54.
- 22 Dec: Former maegashira Nachinoyama, also former Minezaki Oyakata, aged 74.
- 24 Dec: Former maegashira Nanatsuumi, aged 67.

== See also ==
- Glossary of sumo terms
- List of past sumo wrestlers
- List of years in sumo
- List of yokozuna
