= 1993 in sumo =

The following are the events in professional sumo during 1993.

== Tournaments ==
=== Hatsu basho ===
Ryōgoku Kokugikan, Tokyo, 10 – 24 January

1993 Hatsu basho results - Makuuchi Division
W		L		A	East			Rank	West			W		L		A
13	-	2	-	0		(United States)	**Akebono**	O		(United States)	**Konishiki**	10	-	5	-	0
11	-	4	-	0		(Japan)	**Takahanada**	S		(Japan)	Kotonishiki	7	-	8	-	0
10	-	5	-	0		(United States)	**Musashimaru**	HD	ø	(Japan)	Kirishima	0	-	0	-	15
4	-	11	-	0		(Japan)	Daishōhō	K		(Japan)	Takamisugi	4	-	11	-	0
9	-	6	-	0		(Japan)	**Akinoshima**	M1		(Japan)	Kushimaumi	7	-	8	-	0
6	-	9	-	0		(Japan)	Tomoefuji	M2		(Japan)	Misugisato	7	-	8	-	0
10	-	5	-	0		(Japan)	**Wakahanada**	M3		(Japan)	**Wakashoyo**	10	-	5	-	0
5	-	10	-	0		(Japan)	Daizen	M4		(Japan)	Toyonoumi	7	-	8	-	0
6	-	9	-	0		(Japan)	Terao	M5		(Japan)	Takatōriki	5	-	10	-	0
8	-	7	-	0		(Japan)	**Tochinowaka**	M6		(Japan)	**Kyokudōzan**	8	-	7	-	0
10	-	5	-	0		(Japan)	**Takanonami**	M7		(Japan)	Kitakachidoki	7	-	8	-	0
8	-	7	-	0		(Japan)	**Oginohana**	M8		(Japan)	Kotonowaka	6	-	9	-	0
0	-	0	-	15	ø	(Japan)	Kototsubaki	M9	ø	(Japan)	**Kotobeppu**	8	-	6	-	1
3	-	12	-	0		(Japan)	Tokitsunada	M10		(Japan)	**Mitoizumi**	8	-	7	-	0
6	-	9	-	0		(Japan)	Kasugafuji	M11	ø	(Japan)	Kirinishiki	0	-	5	-	10
9	-	6	-	0		(Japan)	**Kotoinazuma**	M12		(Japan)	Tamakairiki	2	-	13	-	0
2	-	13	-	0		(Japan)	Tatsuhikari	M13		(Japan)	**Kiraihō**	8	-	7	-	0
10	-	5	-	0		(Japan)	**Naminohana**	M14		(Japan)	**Daishōyama**	12	-	3	-	0
2	-	3	-	10	ø	(Japan)	Kotogaume	M15		(Japan)	**Kotofuji**	9	-	6	-	0
9	-	6	-	0		(Japan)	**Mainoumi**	M16		(Japan)	Kyokugōzan	4	-	11	-	0

ø - Indicates a pull-out or absent rank
**winning record in bold**
**Yusho Winner**

=== Haru basho ===
Osaka Prefectural Gymnasium, Osaka, 14 March – 28 March

1993 Haru basho results - Makuuchi Division
W		L		A	East			Rank	West			W		L		A
10	-	5	-	0		(United States)	**Akebono**	Y	ø							
11	-	4	-	0		(Japan)	**Takanohana**	O		(United States)	**Konishiki**	9	-	6	-	0
10	-	5	-	0		(United States)	**Musashimaru**	S	ø	(Japan)	Akinoshima	0	-	2	-	13
					ø			HD		(Japan)	Kirishima	5	-	10	-	0
14	-	1	-	0		(Japan)	**Wakahanada**	K		(Japan)	**Wakashoyo**	10	-	5	-	0
5	-	10	-	0		(Japan)	Kotonishiki	HD	ø							
9	-	6	-	0		(Japan)	**Takanonami**	M1		(Japan)	Tochinowaka	4	-	11	-	0
9	-	6	-	0		(Japan)	**Kyokudōzan**	M2	ø	(Japan)	Kushimaumi	7	-	7	-	1
3	-	12	-	0		(Japan)	Daishōyama	M3		(Japan)	**Misugisato**	9	-	6	-	0
5	-	10	-	0		(Japan)	Oginohana	M4		(Japan)	**Tomoefuji**	9	-	6	-	0
6	-	9	-	0		(Japan)	Daishōhō	M5	ø	(Japan)	Kotobeppu	0	-	0	-	15
8	-	7	-	0		(Japan)	**Takamisugi**	M6		(Japan)	**Toyonoumi**	8	-	7	-	0
5	-	10	-	0		(Japan)	Naminohana	M7		(Japan)	Mitoizumi	4	-	11	-	0
6	-	9	-	0		(Japan)	Kotoinazuma	M8		(Japan)	**Kitakachidoki**	8	-	7	-	0
4	-	11	-	0		(Japan)	Kototsubaki	M9		(Japan)	**Terao**	8	-	7	-	0
8	-	7	-	0		(Japan)	**Kotofuji**	M10		(Japan)	Daizen	7	-	8	-	0
6	-	9	-	0		(Japan)	Kiraihō	M11		(Japan)	Mainoumi	6	-	9	-	0
9	-	6	-	0		(Japan)	**Takatōriki**	M12		(Japan)	**Kotonowaka**	9	-	6	-	0
6	-	9	-	0		(Japan)	Aogiyama	M13		(Japan)	**Tochinofuji**	8	-	7	-	0
7	-	8	-	0		(Japan)	Hitachiryu	M14		(Japan)	**Kenkō**	10	-	5	-	0
9	-	6	-	0		(Japan)	**Kasugafuji**	M15		(Japan)	Enazakura	6	-	9	-	0
9	-	6	-	0		(Japan)	**Higonoumi**	M16	ø							

ø - Indicates a pull-out or absent rank
**winning record in bold**
**Yusho Winner**

=== Natsu basho ===
Ryōgoku Kokugikan, Tokyo, 9 May – 23 May

1993 Natsu basho results - Makuuchi Division
W		L		A	East			Rank	West			W		L		A
13	-	2	-	0		(United States)	**Akebono**	Y	ø							
14	-	1	-	0		(Japan)	**Takanohana**	O		(United States)	Konishiki	7	-	8	-	0
9	-	6	-	0		(United States)	**Musashimaru**	S		(Japan)	**Wakanohana**	10	-	5	-	0
7	-	8	-	0		(Japan)	Wakashoyo	HD	ø							
10	-	5	-	0		(Japan)	**Takanonami**	K		(Japan)	Kyokudōzan	4	-	11	-	0
7	-	8	-	0		(Japan)	Misugisato	M1		(Japan)	Tomoefuji	3	-	12	-	0
8	-	7	-	0		(Japan)	**Kirishima**	M2		(Japan)	Takamisugi	5	-	10	-	0
8	-	7	-	0		(Japan)	**Kotonishiki**	M3		(Japan)	Toyonoumi	5	-	10	-	0
6	-	9	-	0		(Japan)	Kushimaumi	M4	ø	(Japan)	Kitakachidoki	0	-	0	-	15
5	-	10	-	0		(Japan)	Terao	M5		(Japan)	Kotobeppu	5	-	10	-	0
5	-	10	-	0		(Japan)	Kenkō	M6		(Japan)	**Takatōriki**	11	-	4	-	0
7	-	8	-	0		(Japan)	Kotofuji	M7		(Japan)	**Kotonowaka**	8	-	7	-	0
6	-	9	-	0		(Japan)	Tochinowaka	M8		(Japan)	Kasugafuji	5	-	10	-	0
8	-	7	-	0		(Japan)	**Daishōhō**	M9		(Japan)	Higonoumi	7	-	8	-	0
0	-	0	-	15	ø	(Japan)	Akinoshima	M10		(Japan)	**Oginohana**	9	-	6	-	0
4	-	11	-	0		(Japan)	Tochinofuji	M11		(Japan)	Daizen	7	-	8	-	0
9	-	6	-	0		(Japan)	**Daishōyama**	M12		(Japan)	**Kotoinazuma**	8	-	7	-	0
10	-	5	-	0		(Japan)	**Tokitsunada**	M13		(Japan)	Naminohana	4	-	11	-	0
10	-	5	-	0		(Japan)	**Mitoizumi**	M14		(Japan)	**Kiraihō**	8	-	7	-	0
10	-	5	-	0		(Japan)	**Mainoumi**	M15		(Japan)	Kaiō	4	-	11	-	0
9	-	6	-	0		(Japan)	**Oginishiki**	M16	ø	(Japan)	Hitachiryu	0	-	0	-	15

ø - Indicates a pull-out or absent rank
**winning record in bold**
**Yusho Winner**

=== Nagoya basho ===
Aichi Prefectural Gymnasium, Nagoya, 4 July – 18 July

1993 Nagoya basho results - Makuuchi Division
W		L		A	East		Rank	West			W		L		A
13	-	2	-	0	(United States)	**Akebono***	Y	ø							
13	-	2	-	0	(Japan)	**Takanohana**	O		(United States)	**Konishiki**	9	-	6	-	0
13	-	2	-	0	(Japan)	**Wakanohana**	S		(United States)	**Musashimaru**	8	-	7	-	0
9	-	6	-	0	(Japan)	**Takanonami**	HD	ø							
8	-	7	-	0	(Japan)	**Takatōriki**	K		(Japan)	Wakashoyo	7	-	8	-	0
3	-	12	-	0	(Japan)	Kirishima	M1		(Japan)	**Kotonishiki**	12	-	3	-	0
5	-	10	-	0	(Japan)	Misugisato	M2		(Japan)	**Kotonowaka**	8	-	7	-	0
4	-	11	-	0	(Japan)	Oginohana	M3		(Japan)	Kyokudōzan	4	-	11	-	0
5	-	10	-	0	(Japan)	Tokitsunada	M4		(Japan)	Kitakachidoki	5	-	10	-	0
5	-	10	-	0	(Japan)	Daishōhō	M5		(Japan)	**Mitoizumi**	9	-	6	-	0
5	-	10	-	0	(Japan)	Daishōyama	M6		(Japan)	Mainoumi	4	-	11	-	0
7	-	8	-	0	(Japan)	Takamisugi	M7		(Japan)	Kushimaumi	5	-	10	-	0
5	-	10	-	0	(Japan)	Tomoefuji	M8		(Japan)	Kotoinazuma	5	-	10	-	0
7	-	8	-	0	(Japan)	Toyonoumi	M9		(Japan)	**Kotofuji**	11	-	4	-	0
9	-	6	-	0	(Japan)	**Akinoshima**	M10		(Japan)	Oginishiki	4	-	11	-	0
8	-	7	-	0	(Japan)	**Terao**	M11		(Japan)	**Higonoumi**	8	-	7	-	0
9	-	6	-	0	(Japan)	**Kotobeppu**	M12		(Japan)	**Kiraihō**	8	-	7	-	0
9	-	6	-	0	(Japan)	**Kenkō**	M13		(Japan)	**Tochinowaka**	10	-	5	-	0
9	-	6	-	0	(Japan)	**Daizen**	M14		(Japan)	**Kasugafuji**	9	-	6	-	0
9	-	6	-	0	(Japan)	**Minatofuji**	M15		(Japan)	Aogiyama	5	-	10	-	0
9	-	6	-	0	(Japan)	**Tomonohana**	M16		(Japan)	Hitachiryu	5	-	10	-	0

ø - Indicates a pull-out or absent rank
**winning record in bold**
**Yusho Winner**
***Won 3-Way Playoff**

==== Playoff ====
(Two consecutive victories required to win the Playoff and the yūshō)

- Match 1: Akebono defeated Wakanohana
- Match 2: Akebono defeated Takanohana

=== Aki basho ===
Ryōgoku Kokugikan, Tokyo, 12 September – 26 September

1993 Aki basho results - Makuuchi Division
W		L		A	East			Rank	West			W		L		A
14	-	1	-	0		(United States)	**Akebono**	Y	ø							
12	-	3	-	0		(Japan)	**Takanohana**	O		(Japan)	**Wakanohana**	9	-	6	-	0
0	-	2	-	13	ø	(United States)	Konishiki	HD	ø							
8	-	7	-	0		(United States)	**Musashimaru**	S		(Japan)	**Takanonami**	10	-	5	-	0
					ø			HD			**Kotonishiki**	9	-	6	-	0
7	-	8	-	0		(Japan)	Takatōriki	K		(Japan)	**Kotonowaka**	8	-	7	-	0
5	-	10	-	0		(Japan)	Wakashoyo	M1	ø	(Japan)	Mitoizumi	4	-	10	-	1
6	-	9	-	0		(Japan)	Kotofuji	M2		(Japan)	**Akinoshima**	9	-	6	-	0
6	-	9	-	0		(Japan)	Tochinowaka	M3		(Japan)	Kotobeppu	5	-	10	-	0
7	-	8	-	0		(Japan)	Kenkō	M4		(Japan)	Terao	6	-	9	-	0
6	-	9	-	0		(Japan)	Higonoumi	M5		(Japan)	Daizen	5	-	10	-	0
8	-	7	-	0		(Japan)	**Misugisato**	M6		(Japan)	Kasugafuji	7	-	8	-	0
5	-	10	-	0		(Japan)	Kiraihō	M7		(Japan)	Tokitsunada	7	-	8	-	0
5	-	10	-	0		(Japan)	Minatofuji	M8		(Japan)	**Takamisugi**	8	-	7	-	0
6	-	9	-	0		(Japan)	Kitakachidoki	M9		(Japan)	Oginohana	7	-	8	-	0
9	-	6	-	0		(Japan)	**Tomonohana**	M10		(Japan)	**Daishōhō**	9	-	6	-	0
8	-	7	-	0		(Japan)	**Kyokudōzan**	M11		(Japan)	Toyonoumi	7	-	8	-	0
9	-	6	-	0		(Japan)	**Kirishima**	M12		(Japan)	**Daishōyama**	8	-	7	-	0
12	-	3	-	0		(Japan)	**Kushimaumi**	M13		(Japan)	Tomoefuji	4	-	11	-	0
9	-	6	-	0		(Japan)	**Mainoumi**	M14		(Japan)	**Kotoinazuma**	9	-	6	-	0
2	-	13	-	0		(Japan)	Tatsuhikari	M15		(Japan)	**Musōyama**	9	-	6	-	0
8	-	7	-	0		(Japan)	**Tamakairiki**	M16	ø							

ø - Indicates a pull-out or absent rank
**winning record in bold**
**Yusho Winner**

=== Kyushu basho ===
Fukuoka International Centre, Kyushu, 7 November – 21 November

1993 Kyushu basho results - Makuuchi Division
W		L		A	East			Rank	West			W		L		A
13	-	2	-	0		(United States)	**Akebono***	Y	ø							
7	-	8	-	0		(Japan)	Takanohana	O		(Japan)	**Wakanohana**	12	-	3	-	0
6	-	9	-	0		(United States)	Konishiki	HD	ø							
12	-	3	-	0		(Japan)	**Takanonami**	S		(Japan)	**Kotonishiki**	9	-	6	-	0
					ø			HD		(United States)	**Musashimaru**	13	-	2	-	0
7	-	8	-	0		(Japan)	Kotonowaka	K		(Japan)	Akinoshima	6	-	9	-	0
5	-	10	-	0		(Japan)	Takatōriki	M1		(Japan)	Kushimaumi	5	-	10	-	0
6	-	9	-	0		(Japan)	Misugisato	M2		(Japan)	**Tomonohana**	8	-	7	-	0
6	-	8	-	1	ø	(Japan)	Daishōhō	M3		(Japan)	Takamisugi	4	-	11	-	0
3	-	12	-	0		(Japan)	Kirishima	M4	ø	(Japan)	Kotofuji	0	-	0	-	15
7	-	8	-	0		(Japan)	Kenkō	M5		(Japan)	**Wakashoyo**	8	-	7	-	0
8	-	7	-	0		(Japan)	**Tochinowaka**	M6		(Japan)	Terao	7	-	8	-	0
5	-	10	-	0		(Japan)	Higonoumi	M7		(Japan)	Kyokudōzan	6	-	9	-	0
6	-	9	-	0		(Japan)	Mainoumi	M8		(Japan)	**Kotobeppu**	8	-	7	-	0
6	-	9	-	0		(Japan)	Kotoinazuma	M9		(Japan)	Kasugafuji	6	-	9	-	0
6	-	9	-	0		(Japan)	Daishōyama	M10		(Japan)	Tokitsunada	6	-	9	-	0
0	-	0	-	15	ø	(Japan)	Mitoizumi	M11		(Japan)	**Musōyama**	9	-	6	-	0
10	-	5	-	0		(Japan)	**Daizen**	M12		(Japan)	Oginohana	4	-	11	-	0
8	-	7	-	0		(Japan)	**Kiraihō**	M13		(Japan)	**Tamakairiki**	8	-	7	-	0
9	-	6	-	0		(Japan)	**Kitakachidoki**	M14		(Japan)	**Toyonoumi**	8	-	7	-	0
7	-	8	-	0		(Japan)	Minatofuji	M15		(Japan)	**Kaiō**	10	-	5	-	0
11	-	4	-	0		(Japan)	**Oginishiki**	M16	ø							

ø - Indicates a pull-out or absent rank
**winning record in bold**
**Yusho Winner**
***Won Playoff**

== News ==
=== January ===
- 24: Ōzeki Akebono takes his third top division championship and his second straight, virtually guaranteeing his promotion to yokozuna after only eight months as an ōzeki. The second division jūryō championship goes to Aogiyama. He would win a second eight years later in 2001.
- 27: The Yokozuna Deliberation Council announces the promotion of Akebono to yokozuna, ending years of speculation about whether a foreign-born wrestler would ever be judged to have the dignity and ability necessary to wear the tsuna. This also marks the end of the exceedingly rare occurrence of there being no active yokozuna, a gap which had lasted for eight months.

=== March ===
- 14: Akebono makes his yokozuna debut. Takahanada's ōzeki debut makes him the youngest ōzeki ever at 20 years and 5 months.
- 28: Following historical precedent, Akebono does not take the championship in his yokozuna debut, losing it to komusubi Wakahanada, who along with his first championship also snaps up the Technique Prize and the Outstanding Performance Prize. His brother Takahanada is the runner up. Tokitsunada takes his first of his two jūryō championships.

=== May ===
- 9: The brothers Ōzeki Takahanada and newly promoted sekiwake Wakahanada have their first tournaments at the new ring names Takanohana II and Wakanohana III respectively, to mark their pedigree as the sons of the legendary ōzeki Takanohana I and nephews of the great yokozuna Wakanohana II.
- 23: Takanohana takes his third top division yūshō, his first as an ōzeki, with a 14–1 record. Akebono must settle for runner-up. Future makuuchi regular Minatofuji takes the jūryō championship.

=== July ===
- 18: In Nagoya, Akebono finally gets his first championship as yokozuna by winning a three-way playoff between himself and brothers Takanohana and Wakanohana. It is Akebono's fourth championship. Takanohana's loss would deny him a promotion to yokozuna this time around. Tatsuhikari wins his first of two jūryō championships.

=== September ===
- 12: Wakanohana debuts for the first time at ōzeki. Future ōzeki Musōyama makes his makuuchi debut. Ōzeki Konishiki is injured against Akinoshima and withdraws from the entire tournament after only this bout.
- 26: Akebono takes a consecutive championship and his fifth overall. Takanohana is again runner-up. Later makuuchi regular Hamanoshima has his one and only jūryō championship. Two former jūryō wrestlers announce their retirements – Wakatosho at the age of 24 due to a left ankle injury, and Daigaku at age 28.

=== November ===
- 21: Akebono has his 3rd consecutive championship and his sixth overall by beating future yokozuna Musashimaru in a playoff. Konishiki's 6–9 losing record following the previous tournament where he missed all but the first day, would see him finally lose ōzeki status after 39 consecutive tournaments. Asanowaka receives his one and only jūryō championship.

== Deaths ==
- 3 September: Former komusubi Wakasegawa Taiji, also former Asakayama Oyakata, aged 73, of pancreatic cancer.

== See also ==
- Glossary of sumo terms
- List of past sumo wrestlers
- List of years in sumo
- List of yokozuna
