= Wakashoyo Shunichi =

Japanese mixed martial artist, kickboxer, professional wrestler and rikishi

Personal information
- Native name: 若翔洋 俊一
- Born: Yoichi Babaguchi; 8 March 1966 (age 60) Tokyo, Japan
- Height: 181 cm (5 ft 11 in)
- Weight: 164 kg (362 lb)

Sport
- Sport: Sumo
- Retired: November 1997
- Heya: Futagoyama
- Record: 496–444–57
- Debut: May 1981
- Highest rank: Sekiwake (May, 1993)
- Elder name: See Career
- Championships: 1 (Jūryō); 1 (Sandanme)
- Special Prizes: Fighting Spirit (2)
- Updated on June 2020

Wakashoyo Shunichi (born 8 March 1966 as Yoichi Babaguchi) is a Japanese mixed martial artist, kickboxer, professional wrestler and former sumo wrestler.

== Career ==
Although born in Chiba, he grew up in Nakano, Tokyo. He joined sumo in 1981, wrestling out of Futagoyama stable. He first entered the top makuuchi division in 1991 and made his sanyaku debut in March 1993 from komusubi rank. Unusually, he came through with a winning record (which included a win over new yokozuna Akebono), and was awarded his second successive special prize for Fighting Spirit. After the tournament he was promoted to sekiwake, which was the highest rank he was to achieve. He retired in November 1997 and became an elder of the Japan Sumo Association under the name Otowayama. However, the retirement of his former stablemate, Wakanohana in March 2000 meant that his elder name was needed by the former Takamisugi (who had been borrowing Wakanohana's), and Wakashoyo had to leave the sumo world.

He then signed with K-1, a kickboxing and mixed martial arts organization, fighting under his old shikona (He uses the Latin script, appearing as "WAKASHOYO" rather than using the Japanese characters. The Sumo Association requested that Konishiki do the same thing in his post-sumo career). He made his debut in a kickboxing bout against fellow newcomer, South Korean giant Choi Hong-man in the quarter-final of the K-1 World Grand Prix 2005 in Seoul on 19 March 2005. Wakashoyo was knocked down twice in the first round; he was not able to recover from the second one. In July 2005 he entered Hero's, the mixed martial arts series promoted by K-1, against kickboxing legend Peter Aerts in an MMA bout at Hero's 2. He was again knocked out in the first round. Wakashoyo returned to the promotion against Kazuhiro Hamanaka at Hero's 5 on 3 May 2006 and was submitted with an arm lock.

In 2008 he began using his real name, Yoichi Babaguchi, as his fighting name. However, he reverted to the name Wakashoyo in December 2010 for a kickboxing match with fellow former sekitori Sentoryu. Out of shape in his first match in over two and a half years, he lost in the first round.

Babaguchi, under his Wakashoyo name, started his career in professional wrestling in Inoki Genome Federation in 2008, later changing to Real Japan Pro Wrestling in 2011.

== Fighting style ==
During his sumo career Wakashoyo favoured yotsu-sumo, or grappling techniques. He preferred a hidari-yotsu, or right hand outside, left hand inside grip on his opponent's mawashi. His most common winning kimarite was yori-kiri, or force out, but he also liked using kotenage, or armlock throw.

== Sumo career record ==
Wakashoyo Shunichi
Year	January Hatsu basho, Tokyo	March Haru basho, Osaka	May Natsu basho, Tokyo	July Nagoya basho, Nagoya	September Aki basho, Tokyo	November Kyūshū basho, Fukuoka
1981	x	x	(Maezumo)	West Jonokuchi #29; 4–3	West Jonidan #139; 4–3	East Jonidan #115; 4–3
1982	East Jonidan #93; 4–3	East Jonidan #64; 3–4	West Jonidan #81; 4–3	West Jonidan #55; 3–4	East Jonidan #71; 5–2	West Jonidan #27; 2–5
1983	East Jonidan #49; 4–3	West Jonidan #34; 5–2	West Sandanme #89; 5–2	West Sandanme #60; 4–3	West Sandanme #45; 2–5	West Sandanme #72; 3–4
1984	West Sandanme #83; 4–3	West Sandanme #62; 3–4	West Sandanme #81; 4–3	West Sandanme #62; 5–2	East Sandanme #33; 5–2	West Sandanme #1; 1–6
1985	West Sandanme #39; 5–2	West Sandanme #9; 3–4	West Sandanme #24; 5–2	East Makushita #55; 2–5	West Sandanme #22; 3–4	East Sandanme #35; 4–3
1986	East Sandanme #15; 7–0; Champion	East Makushita #20; 3–4	East Makushita #34; 3–4	East Makushita #48; 5–2	West Makushita #24; 2–5	East Makushita #42; 5–2
1987	East Makushita #28; 1–6	West Makushita #56; 6–1–P	West Makushita #28; 4–3	West Makushita #19; 2–5	West Makushita #39; 6–1	East Makushita #19; 5–2
1988	East Makushita #10; 4–3	East Makushita #6; 0–3–4	East Makushita #41; 4–3	East Makushita #30; 5–2	West Makushita #17; 6–1	East Makushita #4; 5–2
1989	West Makushita #1; 0–1–6	East Makushita #36; 0–2–5	East Sandanme #12; Sat out due to injury 0–0–7	West Sandanme #72; 6–1	West Sandanme #20; 5–2	West Makushita #50; Sat out due to injury 0–0–7
1990	East Sandanme #31; Sat out due to injury 0–0–7	East Sandanme #92; 6–1	East Sandanme #38; 5–2	East Sandanme #12; 6–1	East Makushita #40; 5–2	East Makushita #20; 5–2
1991	East Makushita #10; 6–1	West Makushita #3; 5–2	East Jūryō #11; 10–5	West Jūryō #3; 9–6	East Maegashira #13; 3–12	West Jūryō #4; 10–5–P
1992	West Maegashira #15; 6–9	East Jūryō #2; 10–5	East Maegashira #11; 5–10	East Jūryō #2; 10–5	West Maegashira #13; 10–5	East Maegashira #4; 8–7
1993	West Maegashira #3; 10–5; F	West Komusubi #1; 10–5; F	East Sekiwake #2; 7–8	West Komusubi #1; 7–8	East Maegashira #1; 5–10	West Maegashira #5; 8–7
1994	West Komusubi #1; 6–9	East Maegashira #2; 4–11	East Maegashira #10; 2–13	East Jūryō #6; 8–7	West Jūryō #4; 9–6	West Jūryō #1; 11–4–P
1995	East Maegashira #15; 8–7	West Maegashira #12; 9–6	East Maegashira #4; 3–12	East Maegashira #15; 11–4	East Maegashira #4; 7–8	West Maegashira #4; 5–9–1
1996	East Maegashira #10; Sat out due to injury 0–0–15	East Maegashira #10; 6–9	West Maegashira #14; 4–11	East Jūryō #7; 11–4–P	East Jūryō #3; 5–10	West Jūryō #9; 9–6
1997	East Jūryō #5; 10–5	East Jūryō #2; 4–11	West Jūryō #7; 8–7	East Jūryō #5; 1–14	East Makushita #7; 3–4	West Makushita #13; Retired; 1–1–0
Record given as wins–losses–absences Top division champion Top division runner-up Retired Lower divisions Non-participation Sanshō key: F=Fighting spirit; O=Outstanding performance; T=Technique Also shown: ★=Kinboshi; P=Playoff(s); Divisions: Makuuchi — Jūryō — Makushita — Sandanme — Jonidan — Jonokuchi Makuuchi ranks: Yokozuna — Ōzeki — Sekiwake — Komusubi — Maegashira

== Kickboxing record ==
Res.	Record	Opponent	Method	Event	Date	Round	Time	Location	Notes
0 wins, 6 losses, 1 draw
Loss	0–6–1	(United States) Sentoryū	TKO (3 knockdowns)	Survivor: Round 6	25 December 2010	1	1:09	Tokyo, Japan	
Loss	0–5–1	(Japan) Noboru Tadashi	TKO (low kicks)	Utsunomiya Utsunomiya Vol.2	29 March 2009	1	0:46	Japan	
Loss	0–4–1	(Japan) Masami Ueno	KO	Chikusei Fighting Dream	15 September 2008	1	0:40	Japan	
Loss	0–3–1	(Japan) Atsushi Hamada	KO (right low kick)	Dragon Moero	22 December 2007	1	1:55	Japan	
Loss	0–2–1	(Japan) Gen Shiyo	KO (right low kick)	New Japan Kickboxing Association: Titans Neos II	16 September 2007	1	0:54	Japan	
Draw	0–1–1	(Japan) Mr. Kamikaze	No decision	Ryukyu Kamikaze Spirit	13 November 2005	3	3:00	Okinawa Prefecture, Japan	
Loss	0–1	(South Korea) Choi Hong-man	KO (left hook)	K-1 World Grand Prix 2005 in Seoul	19 March 2005	1	1:40	Seoul, South Korea	2005 Seoul Grand Prix quarter-final bout.

== Mixed martial arts record ==
Professional record breakdown
8 matches	1 win	6 losses
By knockout	0	5
By submission	1	1
Draws	1	

Res.	Record	Opponent	Method	Event	Date	Round	Time	Location	Notes
Loss	1–6–1	Kyoshiro Kawada	KO (punches)	Kingdom Ehrgeiz: Majors vs. Indies	30 April 2012	1	N/A	Tokyo, Japan	
Loss	1–5–1	Hirohide Fujinuma	TKO (punches)	Deep: 47 Impact	17 April 2010	1	0:17	Tokyo, Japan	
Loss	1–4–1	Yusuke Kawaguchi	TKO (punches)	Deep: Megaton Grand Prix 2008 Semifinal	24 May 2008	1	0:16	Tokyo, Japan	
Win	1–3–1	Kintaro Tsurukame	Submission (punches)	Deep: Megaton Grand Prix 2008 Opening Round	29 March 2008	1	1:22	Tokyo, Japan	
Loss	0–3–1	Kengo Watanabe	TKO (punches)	GCM: Cage Force EX Western Bound	17 February 2007	1	0:20	Tottori, Japan	
Loss	0–2–1	Kazuhiro Hamanaka	Submission (kimura)	K-1: Hero's 5	3 May 2006	1	1:22	Tokyo, Japan	
Draw	0–1–1	Soichi Nishida	Draw	GCM: D.O.G. 4	11 December 2005	2	5:00	Tokyo, Japan	
Loss	0–1	Peter Aerts	TKO (punches)	K-1: Hero's 2	6 July 2005	1	1:36	Tokyo, Japan	

== See also ==
- Glossary of sumo terms
- List of past sumo wrestlers
- List of sekiwake
- List of sumo tournament second division champions
