= Daigaku Munemasa =

Sumo wrestler

Personal information
- Native name: 大岳 宗正
- Born: Hideki Yokoe; 14 April 1965 (age 61) Kusatsu, Shiga, Japan
- Height: 1.85 m (6 ft 1 in)
- Weight: 145 kg (320 lb)

Sport
- Sport: Sumo
- Retired: September, 1993
- Heya: Tokitsukaze
- Record: 268-224-45
- Debut: March, 1983
- Highest rank: Jūryō 2 (March, 1992)
- Championships: 1 (Jūryō)
- Updated on Sep. 2012

Daigaku Munemasa (Japanese: 大岳 宗正; born 14 April 1965 as Hideki Yokoe (横江 英樹, Yokoe Hideki)) is a former sumo wrestler from Kusatsu, Shiga, Japan. He made his professional debut in March 1983. In January 1987, nearly four years later, he took part in a nine-way playoff for the third-division championship, winning the initial bout but then losing twice to his remaining rivals. Another almost five years later, now ranked in the second division, he then won his only championship in November 1989, winning in a four-way playoff. Nevertheless, he never reached the top division. His highest rank was jūryō 2. He left the sumo world upon retirement from active competition in September 1993.

== Career record ==
Daigaku Munemasa
Year	January Hatsu basho, Tokyo	March Haru basho, Osaka	May Natsu basho, Tokyo	July Nagoya basho, Nagoya	September Aki basho, Tokyo	November Kyūshū basho, Fukuoka
1983	x	(Maezumo)	East Jonokuchi #11; 6–1–PP	West Jonidan #88; 6–1	West Jonidan #21; 5–2	West Sandanme #77; 2–5
1984	West Sandanme #99; 5–2	East Sandanme #66; 4–3	East Sandanme #45; 2–5	East Sandanme #71; 4–3	East Sandanme #53; 2–5	West Sandanme #85; 5–2
1985	East Sandanme #49; 4–3	West Sandanme #36; 5–2	East Sandanme #7; 3–4	East Sandanme #21; 3–4	West Sandanme #34; 3–4	East Sandanme #47; 4–3
1986	West Sandanme #29; 5–2	East Sandanme #1; 3–4	East Sandanme #15; 5–2	West Makushita #48; 4–3	East Makushita #35; 4–3	West Makushita #27; 5–2
1987	East Makushita #17; 6–1–PPP	East Makushita #4; 1–6	West Makushita #32; 4–3	East Makushita #22; 4–3	East Makushita #17; 4–3	East Makushita #9; 4–3
1988	West Makushita #5; 4–3	East Makushita #2; 4–3	West Makushita #1; 3–4	West Makushita #5; 2–5	West Makushita #16; 2–5	West Makushita #38; 2–5
1989	West Makushita #59; 5–2	East Makushita #41; 5–2	West Makushita #24; 4–3	West Makushita #17; 3–4	West Makushita #23; 4–3	West Makushita #15; 6–1
1990	West Makushita #5; 5–2	West Makushita #1; 4–3	East Makushita #1; 3–4	East Makushita #4; 3–4	West Makushita #8; 6–1	West Makushita #2; 6–1
1991	West Jūryō #11; 8–7	East Jūryō #8; 8–7	West Jūryō #5; 6–9	East Jūryō #10; 8–7	West Jūryō #7; 6–9	East Jūryō #9; 10–5–PP; Champion
1992	West Jūryō #4; 8–7	West Jūryō #2; 5–10	East Jūryō #8; 10–5	West Jūryō #2; 3–3–9	West Jūryō #11; Sat out due to injury 0–0–15	West Jūryō #11; 5–10
1993	East Makushita #5; Sat out due to injury 0–0–7	East Makushita #45; 5–2	West Makushita #27; 3–4	West Makushita #34; Sat out due to injury 0–0–7	West Sandanme #14; Retired; 0–0–7	x
Record given as wins–losses–absences Top division champion Top division runner-up Retired Lower divisions Non-participation Sanshō key: F=Fighting spirit; O=Outstanding performance; T=Technique Also shown: ★=Kinboshi; P=Playoff(s); Divisions: Makuuchi — Jūryō — Makushita — Sandanme — Jonidan — Jonokuchi Makuuchi ranks: Yokozuna — Ōzeki — Sekiwake — Komusubi — Maegashira

== See also ==
- Glossary of sumo terms
- List of past sumo wrestlers
- List of sumo tournament second division champions
