= Kazutaka Kogi =

Japanese academic (born 1933)

- Born: February 26, 1933

Kazutaka Kogi (born 1933) is a Japanese academic known for his contributions to simple, low-cost interventions in small manufacturing enterprises that improve the working conditions for the employees and at the same time also improve the overall productivity of the workforce.

The interventions are based on simple and low-cost modifications, on local solutions to highly specific local problems and specifically on the collaboration between the shopfloor and the managerial level. This collaborative or participatory approach is possible because the intervention is presented as a win-win situation for both parties. Kogi and his colleague Kageyo Noro introduced the concept of participatory ergonomics in Singapore in 1983

Kogi has worked extensively for the International Labour Organization and held the Vice-Presidency for International Commission on Occupational Health (ICOH) in 2006-2009.

In 2022, he was awarded the ICOH Lifetime Achievement Award

== See also ==
- Work improvement in small enterprises
