= Tamakairiki Tsuyoshi =

Japanese sumo wrestler

Personal information
- Native name: 玉海力剛
- Born: Yukio Kawabe; July 16, 1966 (age 60) Shibuya, Tokyo
- Height: 1.83 m (6 ft 0 in)
- Weight: 141 kg (311 lb)

Sport
- Sport: Sumo
- Retired: March, 1996
- Heya: Kataonami
- Record: 408-413-23
- Debut: March, 1982
- Highest rank: Maegashira 8
- Championships: 1 (Sandanme); 1 (Jonidan)

Yukio Kawabe
- Born: July 16, 1966 (age 60); Japan
- Other names: Tamakairiki Tsuyoshi
- Nationality: Japanese
- Height: 1.83 m (6 ft 0 in)
- Weight: 100 kg (220 lb; 16 st)
- Team: Team Tamakairiki

Mixed martial arts record
- Total: 3
- Wins: 0
- By knockout: 0
- By submission: 0
- By decision: 0
- Losses: 3
- By knockout: 1
- By submission: 2
- By decision: 0
- Draws: 0
- No contests: 0

Other information
- Mixed martial arts record from Sherdog

Tamakairiki Tsuyoshi (born July 16, 1966 as Yukio Kawabe) is a Japanese former sumo wrestler and mixed martial artist from Shibuya, Tokyo who fought in Pride Fighting Championships and Pancrase. He was a wrestler in the top makuuchi division during his 14 years as a professional from 1982 until 1996, reaching a highest rank of maegashira 8 in 1992. He suffered a fracture of his right thumb in May 1993 which led to his eventual retirement in March 1996. Upon retirement he opened a chankonabe restaurant in his neighborhood of Shibuya, which now has branches in Musashi Koyama, Akasaka and Shandong. In 2009 he helped found the Japan Beach Sumo Federation, which aims to promote beach sumo as a healthy after-school activity for children. He is a father of two. His daughter is a member of idol group MAJOPICHU. His uncle is shogi player Keiji Mori.

== Sumo tournament record ==
Tamakairiki Tsuyoshi
| Year | January Hatsu basho, Tokyo | March Haru basho, Osaka | May Natsu basho, Tokyo | July Nagoya basho, Nagoya | September Aki basho, Tokyo | November Kyūshū basho, Fukuoka |
|---|---|---|---|---|---|---|
| 1982 | x | (Maezumo) | West Jonokuchi #16; 5–2 | East Jonidan #111; 3–4 | East Jonidan #126; 4–3 | East Jonidan #96; 4–3 |
| 1983 | West Jonidan #72; 1–6 | West Jonidan #107; 6–1 | West Jonidan #39; 7–0–P; Champion | East Sandanme #39; 4–3 | West Sandanme #23; 4–3 | West Sandanme #12; 4–3 |
| 1984 | West Makushita #58; 3–4 | West Sandanme #17; 4–3 | West Sandanme #3; 4–3 | East Makushita #46; 5–2 | East Makushita #25; 3–4 | East Makushita #37; 4–3 |
| 1985 | East Makushita #25; 2–5 | East Makushita #47; 1–6 | West Sandanme #18; 2–5 | West Sandanme #47; 3–4 | West Sandanme #62; 7–0 | East Makushita #55; 5–2 |
| 1986 | East Makushita #34; 4–3 | East Makushita #23; 2–5 | East Makushita #45; 3–4 | East Sandanme #1; 5–2 | West Makushita #33; 5–2 | East Makushita #18; 3–4 |
| 1987 | East Makushita #29; 6–1–P | West Makushita #12; 5–2 | West Makushita #5; 1–6 | East Makushita #26; 3–4 | West Makushita #33; 5–2 | West Makushita #19; 2–5 |
| 1988 | West Makushita #38; 2–5 | West Makushita #60; 3–4 | East Sandanme #13; 5–2 | West Makushita #52; 5–2 | East Makushita #31; 3–4 | West Makushita #42; 6–1 |
| 1989 | East Makushita #20; 5–2 | West Makushita #10; 5–2 | East Makushita #2; 4–3 | East Makushita #1; 5–2 | East Jūryō #12; 7–8 | East Makushita #1; 4–3 |
| 1990 | West Jūryō #13; 8–7 | East Jūryō #9; 8–7 | West Jūryō #4; 6–9 | West Jūryō #9; 8–7 | East Jūryō #6; 7–8 | East Jūryō #9; 8–7 |
| 1991 | West Jūryō #5; 7–8 | East Jūryō #7; 7–8 | West Jūryō #9; 9–6 | East Jūryō #4; 9–6 | West Maegashira #15; 2–11–2 | East Jūryō #7; 9–6 |
| 1992 | East Jūryō #5; 9–6 | East Jūryō #1; 9–6 | East Maegashira #13; 6–9 | East Jūryō #1; 9–6 | East Maegashira #14; 9–6 | East Maegashira #8; 6–9 |
| 1993 | West Maegashira #12; 2–13 | West Jūryō #4; 8–7 | West Jūryō #3; 9–6 | West Jūryō #1; 8–7 | East Maegashira #16; 8–7 | West Maegashira #13; 8–7 |
| 1994 | West Maegashira #9; 2–13 | West Jūryō #4; 5–10 | West Jūryō #9; 7–8 | West Jūryō #11; 8–7 | West Jūryō #8; 6–9 | West Jūryō #11; 8–7 |
| 1995 | West Jūryō #10; 2–13 | West Makushita #6; 0–7 | East Makushita #41; Sat out due to injury 0–0–7 | West Sandanme #21; 2–5 | West Sandanme #51; 3–4 | East Sandanme #70; 3–4 |
| 1996 | East Sandanme #88; Sat out due to injury 0–0–7 | East Jonidan #48; Retired; 0–0 | x | x | x | x |
Record given as wins–losses–absences Top division champion Top division runner-up Retired Lower divisions Non-participation Sanshō key: F=Fighting spirit; O=Outstanding performance; T=Technique Also shown: ★=Kinboshi; P=Playoff(s); Divisions: Makuuchi — Jūryō — Makushita — Sandanme — Jonidan — Jonokuchi Makuuchi ranks: Yokozuna — Ōzeki — Sekiwake — Komusubi — Maegashira

== Mixed martial arts record ==
Professional record breakdown
| 3 matches | 0 wins | 3 losses |
| By knockout | 0 | 1 |
| By submission | 0 | 2 |

| Res. | Record | Opponent | Method | Event | Date | Round | Time | Location | Notes |
|---|---|---|---|---|---|---|---|---|---|
| Loss | 0-3 | Yasuaki Miura | Submission (armbar) | Pancrase: Blow 4 | May 2, 2006 | 1 | 1:43 | Tokyo, Japan | |
| Loss | 0-2 | Masayuki Kono | Technical Submission (kimura) | Pancrase: Spiral 5 | July 10, 2005 | 1 | 1:10 | Yokohama, Japan | |
| Loss | 0-1 | Akira Shoji | TKO (punches) | Pride Bushido 3 | May 23, 2004 | 1 | 0:18 | Yokohama, Japan | |

== See also ==
- Glossary of sumo terms
- List of past sumo wrestlers
