= PIACT =

PIACT is an acronym for programme developed by the International Labour Organization for improvement of occupational health and safety. The acronym is derived from its French name Programme international pour l'amélioration des conditions et du milieu de travail (PIACT), but it is also widely known under its English name Programme for the Improvement of Working Conditions and Environment.

The programme was launched by the International Labour Organisation in 1976 at the request of the International Labour Conference. PIACT is designed to promote or support actions aiming at "making work more human". The programme is concerned with improving the quality of working life in a broad interpretation. This includes prevention of occupational accidents and diseases, wide application of principles of ergonomics, enhancement of organization of work and "a greater concern for human element in the transfer of technology".

PIACT has resulted in various publications, most notably the Work improvement in small enterprises (WISE) manuals.
