= Tatsuhikari Kumagoro =

Sumo wrestler

Personal information
- Native name: 立洸 熊五郎
- Born: Yoshimitsu Ishibashi; October 25, 1969 Shari, Hokkaidō, Japan
- Died: February 24, 2011 (aged 41)
- Height: 1.92 m (6 ft 3 1/2 in)
- Weight: 190 kg (420 lb)

Sport
- Sport: Sumo
- Retired: March, 1999
- Heya: Tatsunami
- Record: 391-356-25
- Debut: March, 1985
- Highest rank: Maegashira 6 (July, 1992)
- Championships: 2 (Jūryō); 2 (Makushita)
- Updated on Sep. 2012

Tatsuhikari Kumagoro (born Yoshimitsu Ishibashi, 25 October 1969 – February 24, 2011) was a former sumo wrestler from Shari, Hokkaidō, Japan. He made his professional debut in March 1985 and reached the top division in January 1992. His highest rank was maegashira 6. He retired from active competition in March 1999 and died in February 2011.

== Career record ==
Tatsuhikari Kumagoro
| Year | January Hatsu basho, Tokyo | March Haru basho, Osaka | May Natsu basho, Tokyo | July Nagoya basho, Nagoya | September Aki basho, Tokyo | November Kyūshū basho, Fukuoka |
|---|---|---|---|---|---|---|
| 1985 | x | (Maezumo) | West Jonokuchi #23; 4–3 | West Jonidan #146; 5–2 | East Jonidan #99; 1–6 | West Jonidan #125; 4–3 |
| 1986 | East Jonidan #104; 4–3 | West Jonidan #71; 3–4 | West Jonidan #91; 6–1 | East Jonidan #23; 2–3–2 | West Jonidan #54; 5–2 | West Jonidan #6; 3–4 |
| 1987 | West Jonidan #22; 6–1 | West Sandanme #62; 5–2 | West Sandanme #36; 2–1–4 | East Sandanme #62; 5–2 | West Sandanme #37; 4–2–1 | East Sandanme #21; 5–2 |
| 1988 | East Makushita #60; 4–3 | East Makushita #45; 3–4 | West Makushita #56; 2–5 | West Sandanme #19; 4–3 | East Sandanme #6; 5–2 | East Makushita #42; 2–5 |
| 1989 | West Sandanme #3; 3–4 | West Sandanme #16; 6–1 | East Makushita #43; 3–4 | West Makushita #53; 7–0–P | East Makushita #8; 3–4 | West Makushita #14; 5–2 |
| 1990 | East Makushita #6; 1–6 | West Makushita #28; 5–2 | East Makushita #15; 5–2 | West Makushita #7; 3–4 | East Makushita #11; 5–2 | East Makushita #4; 7–0; Champion |
| 1991 | East Jūryō #10; 6–9 | West Makushita #2; 7–0; Champion | East Jūryō #10; 10–5 | East Jūryō #2; 6–9 | West Jūryō #5; 9–6 | West Jūryō #2; 10–5–P |
| 1992 | West Maegashira #14; 7–8 | West Maegashira #15; 8–7 | West Maegashira #9; 8–7 | West Maegashira #6; 4–11 | West Maegashira #12; 8–7 | East Maegashira #9; 6–9 |
| 1993 | East Maegashira #13; 2–13 | West Jūryō #5; 7–8 | East Jūryō #7; 8–7 | East Jūryō #6; 12–3; Champion | East Maegashira #15; 2–13 | West Jūryō #9; 9–6 |
| 1994 | East Jūryō #5; 6–9 | West Jūryō #8; 10–5 | East Jūryō #6; 6–9 | East Jūryō #10; 12–3; Champion | West Jūryō #2; 4–6–5 | East Jūryō #10; 2–13 |
| 1995 | West Makushita #10; 2–5 | West Makushita #26; Sat out due to injury 0–0–7 | West Sandanme #6; 4–3 | East Makushita #56; 6–1 | East Makushita #28; 5–2 | East Makushita #15; 6–1 |
| 1996 | West Makushita #4; 3–4 | East Makushita #8; 3–4 | West Makushita #16; 3–4 | East Makushita #22; 4–3 | West Makushita #16; 4–3 | East Makushita #11; 4–3 |
| 1997 | East Makushita #7; 3–4 | West Makushita #13; 5–2 | West Makushita #5; 2–5 | West Makushita #17; 4–3 | East Makushita #13; 4–3 | East Makushita #11; 1–6 |
| 1998 | East Makushita #31; 0–4–3 | East Sandanme #6; 5–2 | West Makushita #47; 5–2 | West Makushita #28; 6–1 | West Makushita #11; 1–5–1 | West Makushita #32; 4–3 |
| 1999 | East Makushita #24; 0–7 | East Makushita #59; Retired; 1–4–2 | x | x | x | x |
Record given as wins–losses–absences Top division champion Top division runner-up Retired Lower divisions Non-participation Sanshō key: F=Fighting spirit; O=Outstanding performance; T=Technique Also shown: ★=Kinboshi; P=Playoff(s); Divisions: Makuuchi — Jūryō — Makushita — Sandanme — Jonidan — Jonokuchi Makuuchi ranks: Yokozuna — Ōzeki — Sekiwake — Komusubi — Maegashira

== See also ==
- List of sumo tournament second division champions
- Glossary of sumo terms
- List of past sumo wrestlers
