= Tokitsunada Hironori =

Japanese sumo wrestler (1969–2019)

Personal information
- Native name: 時津洋 宏典
- Born: Hironori Yoshioka; August 2, 1969 Waki, Tokushima, Japan
- Died: February 14, 2019 (aged 49)
- Height: 1.88 m (6 ft 2 in)
- Weight: 179 kg (395 lb)

Sport
- Sport: Sumo
- Retired: September, 1999
- Heya: Tokitsukaze
- Record: 505-486-10
- Debut: March, 1985
- Highest rank: Maegashira 4 (July, 1993)
- Championships: 2 (Jūryō); 1 (Makushita)
- Updated on Sep. 2012

Tokitsunada Hironori (born Hironori Yoshioka; 2 August 1969 – 14 February 2019) was a sumo wrestler from Waki, Tokushima, Japan. He made his professional debut in March 1985, and reached the top division in May 1992. His highest rank was maegashira 4. He retired in September 1999 and remained in the Sumo Association as jun-toshiyori. He had to leave the Sumo Association in September 2001, having failed to acquire a permanent toshiyori. He was the first jun-toshiyori wrestler to be forced to leave sumo in this way. However he later worked in a private capacity as a coach at Arashio stable. He also ran a chanko restaurant named Tokitsunada in Tokyo.

He died of heart failure in February 2019 at the age of 49.

== Career record ==
Tokitsunada Hironori
Year	January Hatsu basho, Tokyo	March Haru basho, Osaka	May Natsu basho, Tokyo	July Nagoya basho, Nagoya	September Aki basho, Tokyo	November Kyūshū basho, Fukuoka
1985	x	(Maezumo)	West Jonokuchi #11; 4–3	West Jonidan #139; 6–1	West Jonidan #66; 4–3	East Jonidan #45; 3–4
1986	East Jonidan #60; 4–3	East Jonidan #32; 3–4	East Jonidan #52; 3–4	West Jonidan #70; 4–3	East Jonidan #45; 4–3	East Jonidan #17; 3–4
1987	East Jonidan #29; 6–1	East Sandanme #70; 1–6	East Jonidan #6; 5–2	West Sandanme #77; 6–1	West Sandanme #26; 4–3	West Sandanme #13; 5–2
1988	West Makushita #56; 2–5	West Sandanme #22; 4–3	East Sandanme #9; 4–3	West Makushita #58; 3–4	East Sandanme #13; 4–3	West Makushita #58; 6–1
1989	East Makushita #30; 1–6	West Makushita #60; 5–2	West Makushita #38; 2–5	West Sandanme #1; 4–3	West Makushita #46; 3–4	West Sandanme #1; 3–4
1990	East Sandanme #15; 6–1	East Makushita #42; 6–1	East Makushita #20; 4–3	West Makushita #15; 7–0; Champion	East Jūryō #13; 8–7	West Jūryō #8; 4–11
1991	West Makushita #2; 4–3	East Makushita #2; 2–5	West Makushita #13; 5–2	East Makushita #3; 4–3	East Jūryō #13; 8–7	West Jūryō #6; 8–7
1992	East Jūryō #6; 8–7	East Jūryō #4; 10–5	East Maegashira #14; 8–7	West Maegashira #11; 8–7	West Maegashira #7; 6–9	East Maegashira #12; 9–6
1993	East Maegashira #10; 3–12	West Jūryō #2; 11–4; Champion	East Maegashira #13; 10–5	East Maegashira #4; 5–10	West Maegashira #7; 7–8	West Maegashira #10; 6–9
1994	West Maegashira #15; 9–6	East Maegashira #11; 8–7	West Maegashira #6; 5–10	West Maegashira #13; 8–7	West Maegashira #12; 8–7	West Maegashira #5; 2–10–3
1995	West Maegashira #14; 7–8	East Jūryō #1; 10–5–P; Champion	East Maegashira #13; 9–6	West Maegashira #6; 3–12	East Maegashira #15; 6–9	East Jūryō #2; 9–6
1996	West Jūryō #1; 7–8	West Jūryō #2; 9–6	West Jūryō #1; 7–8	East Jūryō #3; 9–6	West Jūryō #1; 7–8	East Jūryō #3; 8–7
1997	East Jūryō #3; 9–6	West Jūryō #1; 7–8	East Jūryō #3; 7–8	West Jūryō #4; 7–8	East Jūryō #6; 9–6	West Jūryō #2; 9–6
1998	East Jūryō #1; 6–9	East Jūryō #5; 7–8	East Jūryō #7; 8–7	East Jūryō #3; 7–8	East Jūryō #4; 6–9	East Jūryō #9; 9–6
1999	West Jūryō #4; 6–9	West Jūryō #7; 7–8	East Jūryō #9; 4–11	East Makushita #1; 3–4	West Makushita #4; Retired; 0–0–7	x
Record given as wins–losses–absences Top division champion Top division runner-up Retired Lower divisions Non-participation Sanshō key: F=Fighting spirit; O=Outstanding performance; T=Technique Also shown: ★=Kinboshi; P=Playoff(s); Divisions: Makuuchi — Jūryō — Makushita — Sandanme — Jonidan — Jonokuchi Makuuchi ranks: Yokozuna — Ōzeki — Sekiwake — Komusubi — Maegashira

== See also ==
- List of sumo tournament second division champions
- Glossary of sumo terms
- List of past sumo wrestlers
