= Work improvement in small enterprises =

Practical programme

Work Improvement in Small Enterprises (WISE) is a practical programme developed by the International Labour Organization for improvement of occupational health and safety conditions - in particular small and medium-sized enterprises (SMEs). It is a highly pragmatic approach that focus on simple low-cost interventions which improve both labor productivity and work conditions at the same time. A complete training package with an action manual and a trainers' manual is available from the ILO.

The programme has found particular use in developing economies.

The programme was originally launched as a PIACT activity in 1976.

== Resources ==
- Thurman, Joseph E.; A. E. Louzine; Kazutaka Kogi (1988). Higher productivity and a better place to work: practical ideas for owners and managers of small and medium-sized industrial enterprises. International Labour Organization. ISBN 978-92-2-106409-1. (Action manual)
- Thurman, Joseph E.; A. E. Louzine; Kazutaka Kogi (1988). Higher productivity and a better place to work: practical ideas for owners and managers of small and medium-sized industrial enterprises. International Labour Organization, Geneva. ISBN 978-92-2-106410-7. (Trainers' manual)
