= Akebono Tarō =

American-born Japanese sumo wrestler (1969–2024)

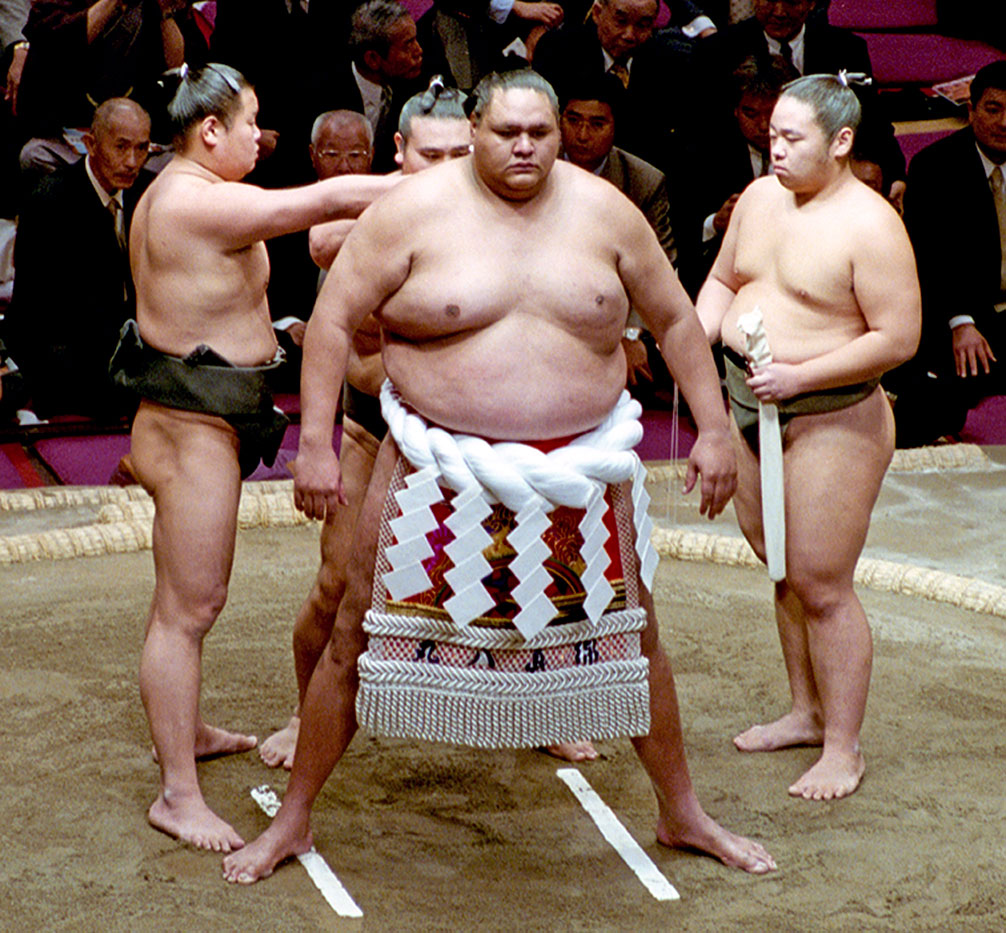
- Akebono in 2001

Personal information
- Native name: 曙太郎
- Born: Chadwick Haʻaheo Rowan; 8 May 1969 Waimānalo, Hawaii, U.S.
- Died: 6 April 2024 (aged 54) Tokyo, Japan
- Height: 203 cm (6 ft 8 in)
- Weight: 233 kg (514 lb; 36.7 st)

Sport
- Sport: Sumo
- Retired: January 2001
- Heya: Azumazeki
- Record: 654–232–181
- Debut: March 1988
- Highest rank: Yokozuna (January 1993)
- Elder name: Akebono
- Championships: 11 (Makuuchi)
- Special Prizes: Outstanding Performance (4); Fighting Spirit (2)
- Gold Stars: 4 Asahifuji (2); Ōnokuni; Hokutoumi
- Updated on June 2020

Akebono Tarō (Japanese: 曙 太郎, Hepburn: Akebono Tarō; born Chadwick Ha’aheo Rowan; 8 May 1969 – 6 April 2024) was an American-born Japanese professional sumo wrestler and professional wrestler from Waimānalo, Hawaii. Joining sumo in Japan in 1988, he was trained by the pioneering Hawaiian wrestler Takamiyama and rose swiftly up the rankings, reaching the top division in 1990. After two consecutive yusho or tournament championships in November 1992 and January 1993 he made history by becoming the first non-Japanese-born wrestler ever to reach yokozuna, the highest rank in sumo.

One of the tallest and heaviest wrestlers ever, Akebono's rivalry with the young Japanese hopefuls Takanohana and Wakanohana was a big factor in the increased popularity of sumo at tournament venues and on TV in the early 1990s. During his eight years at the yokozuna rank, Akebono won a further eight tournament championships, for a career total of eleven, and was a runner-up on thirteen other occasions, despite suffering several serious injuries. Although his rival yokozuna Takanohana won more tournaments in this period, their individual head-to-heads remained very close.

Akebono became a Japanese citizen in 1996, and after retiring in 2001 he worked as a coach at Azumazeki stable before leaving the Sumo Association in 2003. After an unsuccessful period as a K-1 fighter, he became a professional wrestler. In All Japan Pro Wrestling (AJPW) he was a two-time Triple Crown Heavyweight Champion, two-time World Tag Team Champion, and two-time All Asia Tag Team Champion. He also won the 2015 Champion Carnival. He retired from professional wrestling in 2017 because of health problems and died of heart failure in 2024.

== Early life ==
Chad Rowan was born on 8 May 1969, to Randolph and Janice Rowan, and was of Hawaiian descent. He grew up with two younger brothers, one of whom, Ola, also became a sumo wrestler for a brief period after Chad. He attended Kaiser High School, where he played basketball and became an all-star center. He went to Hawaii Pacific University on a basketball scholarship, but sat out his freshman season.

== Sumo career ==
=== Early career ===
Rowan was planning to study for a career in hotel management, but he had always been interested in sumo from watching television broadcasts. A family friend introduced him to Azumazeki Oyakata, the former Takamiyama, who also originally hailed from Hawaii. Azumazeki overcame his initial concerns that Rowan might be too tall and his legs too long for sumo and agreed to let him join his Azumazeki stable, founded in 1986. Rowan flew to Japan in early 1988. Adopting the shikona of Akebono, meaning "new dawn" in Japanese, he made his professional debut in March 1988. This entry cohort was one of the most successful ever, producing two other yokozuna, Takanohana and Wakanohana (sons of the popular champion from the 1970s, Takanohana Kenshi), as well as a great ōzeki, Kaiō.

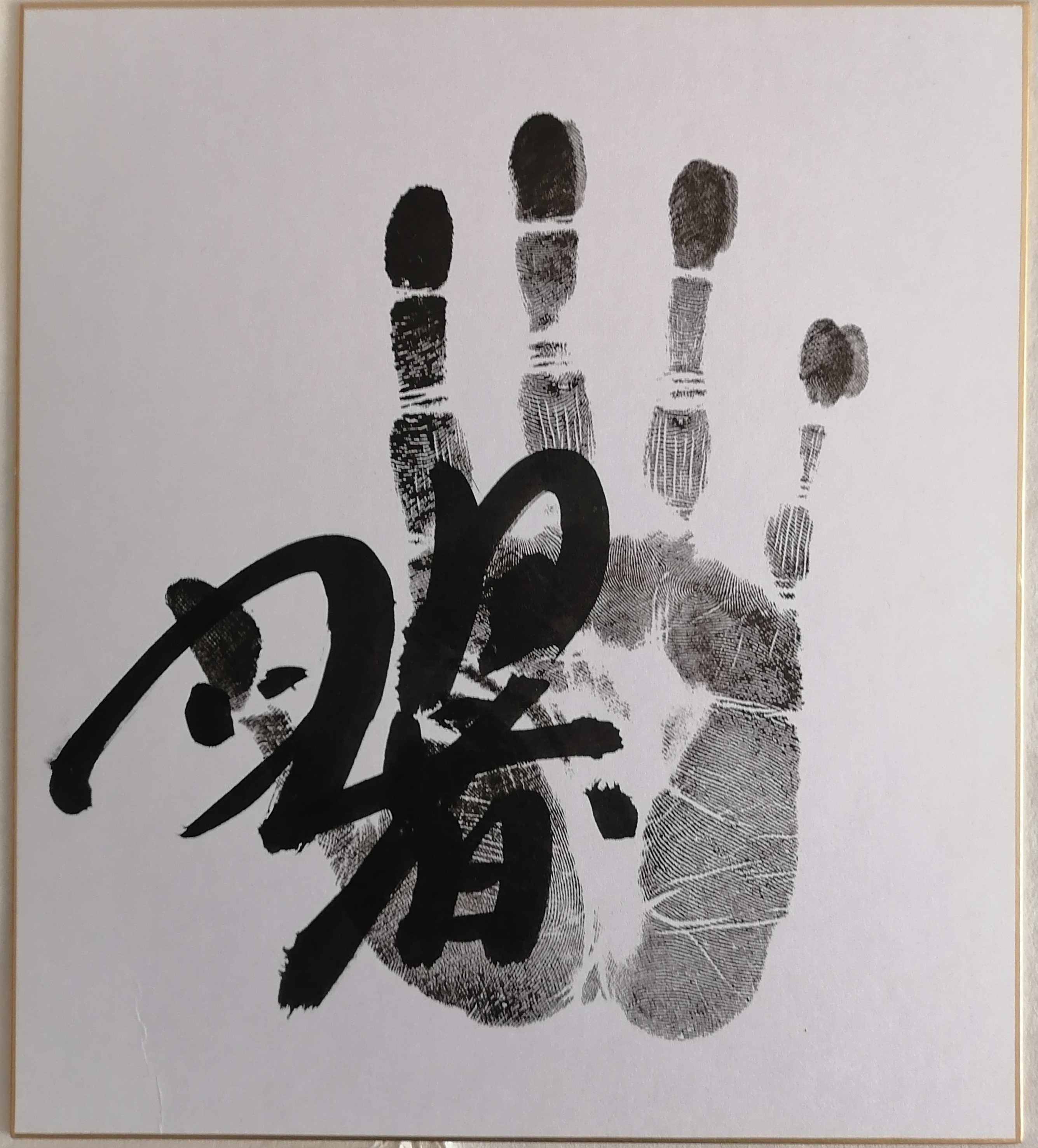
Original tegata (handprint and signature) of sumo wrestler yokozuna Akebono

Akebono rose rapidly through the ranks, equaling the record for the most consecutive kachi-koshi (majority of wins in a sumo tournament) from debut, reaching sekiwake before suffering his first make-koshi or losing record. He was promoted to jūryō in March 1990, the first sekitori from his stable, and to makuuchi in September of the same year. He made his top division debut in the same tournament as Wakanohana, as well as Takatōriki and Daishōyama. In the November 1990 tournament he was awarded his first special prize, for Fighting Spirit, and in January 1991 he earned his first gold star for defeating yokozuna Asahifuji. In March 1991 he defeated ōzeki Konishiki in the first ever match between two non-Japanese wrestlers in the top division.

=== Promotion ===
In 1992, after a year of 8–7 or 7–8 records near the top of the makuuchi division, Akebono suddenly came alive with a 13–2 record in January of that year, narrowly losing the top division championship to Takanohana. A second 13–2 record two tournaments later, in May, saw him win the top division championship for the first time, and with it promotion to ōzeki. After an injury during the summer, he went on to win consecutive championships in November 1992 and January 1993 to win promotion to yokozuna.

At the time of his promotion, the rank of yokozuna had been vacant for eight months (an exceedingly rare occurrence) and his promotion, despite the fact that he was the first foreign yokozuna, was welcomed by many. He had met the stipulation of winning two consecutive tournaments that had been mentioned by the Yokozuna Deliberation Council when turning down Konishiki the previous year, and was also seen as having conducted himself with the dignity and humility necessary for such an exalted rank. One commentator remarked, "He makes me forget he is a foreigner because of his earnest attitude toward sumo."

=== Yokozuna era ===
Akebono was a long-standing and strong yokozuna, lasting nearly eight years in the rank and winning the top division championship on a further eight occasions. His career highlights include the rare achievement of winning the top division championship in three consecutive tournaments, in 1993. In July 1993 he beat Takanohana and Wakanohana in consecutive matches to win the honbasho when all three ended up tied at the end of the 15-day tournament, and in May 1997 he defeated Takanohana twice on the final day, once in their regular match and once in a playoff, to win his first title in over two years. The competition between Akebono and Takanohana, who reached yokozuna himself in 1995, was said to be one of the great defining rivalries of postwar sumo. The two finished their careers with a 25–25 tie in bouts against one another. At the opening ceremony of the 1998 Winter Olympics in Nagano, a professional sumo wrestler was chosen to represent each of the competing countries and lead them into the stadium. After Takanohana fell ill, Akebono was given the honor of representing Japan in the opening ceremony. Akebono also led other sumo wrestlers in a ring cleansing ceremony at the Opening Ceremony (also meant to cleanse the stadium itself).

Akebono suffered frequent injuries during his career. His first serious knee injury came in May 1994 when, after winning his first ten matches of the tournament, he lost a bout to Takatōriki and fell awkwardly. He flew to Los Angeles and underwent career-saving surgery. From November 1998 to March 1999 he missed three successive tournaments due to a herniated disc in his lower back and faced calls for his retirement. After receiving the personal backing of the Chairman of the Japan Sumo Association, he scored a respectable 11–4 record in his comeback tournament in May 1999. In 2000 he enjoyed his first completely injury-free year since 1993 and won two tournaments, finishing as runner-up in three others. He won 76 bouts out of a possible 90, the best record of any wrestler that year.

=== Fighting style ===
Akebono was one of the tallest sumo wrestlers ever, at 203 cm (6 ft 8 in) tall, and also one of the heaviest with a peak weight of 233 kg (514 lb) in March 1999. He was also one of the most aggressive and ferocious sumo wrestlers. Despite having long legs, considered a disadvantage in sumo as it tends to make one top heavy and susceptible to throws, he covered for this by training exceptionally hard, and using his long reach to thrust his opponents out of the dohyō (ring). In his prime, he had incredible thrusting strength and on many occasions would blast lesser wrestlers out of the ring in one or two strokes using tsuppari techniques. His most common winning kimarite was oshi-dashi, a simple push out, and he also regularly won by tsuki-dashi, the thrust out. In later years he also used his reach to more often grab his opponent's mawashi, or belt, and then use his weight and power to force the opponent from the ring by yori-kiri. He liked a migi-yotsu, or left hand outside, right hand inside grip, and was fond of using his left hand to employ uwatenage, or overarm throw.

=== Retirement ===
After winning his eleventh top division title in November 2000, Akebono suffered another injury and, after sitting out the tournament in January 2001, he decided to retire rather than face a daunting struggle back to fighting fitness. Upon retirement, his topknot was ceremonially cut off in the ring by 320 of his friends and previous opponents in front of 11,000 people. After his retirement, he became a member (or elder) of the Japan Sumo Association as a coach, or oyakata, and worked with his former mentor in the Azumazeki stable. He helped train the Mongolian wrestler Asashōryū who also became a yokozuna, and Akebono instructed him on how to perform the dohyō-iri, or yokozuna ring-entering ceremony.

While an oyakata, Akebono also appeared in TV commercials and opened a restaurant called ZUNA.

In June 2013 he returned to Azumazeki stable for the first time since leaving the Sumo Association to oversee some training sessions as an assistant instructor.

== Kickboxing and mixed martial arts career ==
Akebono
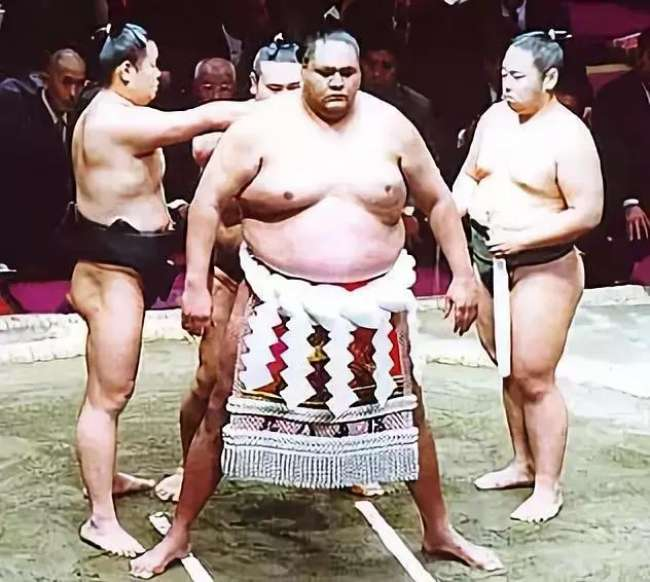
- Born: Chadwick Haheo Rowan; 8 May 1969; Waimānalo, Hawaii, U.S.
- Died: April 2024 (aged 54); Tokyo, Japan
- Other names: Akebono
- Nationality: Japanese
- Height: 6 ft 8 in (203 cm)
- Weight: 514 lb (233 kg; 36 st 10 lb)
- Division: Super heavyweight
- Style: Sumo, Kickboxing
- Stance: Orthodox
- Fighting out of: Tokyo, Japan
- Team: Team Yokozuna
- Rank: Yokozuna in sumo
- Years active: 3 (2003–2006)

Kickboxing record
- Total: 10
- Wins: 1
- Losses: 9
- By knockout: 5

Mixed martial arts record
- Total: 4
- Wins: 0
- Losses: 4
- By submission: 3
- By decision: 1
- Draws: 0

Other information
- Mixed martial arts record from Sherdog

Akebono left the Sumo Association in November 2003 to join K-1. The decision was influenced by financial problems due to the failure of his restaurant, among other financial difficulties. His koenkai, or supporters network, had dissolved after his marriage in 1998, depriving him of a valuable source of income. In addition, he earned far less as an oyakata than he had as a yokozuna. K-1 offered him a chance to clear his debts by fighting for them.

=== K-1 ===
==== 2003–2004 ====
At the time of his debut, Akebono was involved in a highly publicized matchup at K-1 Premium 2003 against popular superheavyweight fighter Bob Sapp. The combined popularity of Sapp and Akebono attracted a crowd of 45,000 to the Nagoya Dome and granted the event a 43% viewership, making it the first time a combat sports event outdrew the NHK music festival Kōhaku Uta Gassen, Japan's traditionally biggest New Year show. The classical matchup of an American foreigner like Sapp against a Japanese national like Taro, a cultural contraposition, also gained comparisons with Japanese professional wrestling legend Rikidōzan in his bouts against The Sharpe Brothers. The match was short and intense. Outweighing Sapp by over 150 pounds (68 kg), Akebono pushed him toward the ring corners with energetic, fast punches, but his stamina fell minutes into the round. The more experienced Sapp then attacked him with low kicks and punching combinations to the head and body, knocking the yokozuna down twice before finishing him by KO at 2:58.

Some months later, Akebono followed with another high level match, this time against the famed Musashi. Akebono had improved his conditioning under Ray Sefo and Fai Falamoe and outweighed Musashi by more than twice his weight, so there was expectation about his performance. As expected, Akebono started strong, overwhelming Musashi with sumo charges against the ropes through the first round. He shocked the crowd with unsportsmanlike conduct in the second, as he suddenly started unloading illegal hooks and rabbit punches on a seated Musashi when the latter slipped and fell. Referee Nobuaki Kakuda warned Akebono while the fight looked to be stopped in a DQ, but a still dazed Musashi insisted to keep on. The fight continued for the remnant time, but although Akebono achieved a significant offense, Musashi ultimately rallied up with punches and several kinds of kicks, controlling the exchanges. After Akebono ended the match with a new foul, a sumo throw, unanimous decision was given to his opponent.

After another decision loss against Chinese fighter Zhang Qingjun in South Korea, Akebono travelled to United States to fight American legend Rick Roufus in K-1 Las Vegas. During the fight, Roufus avoided being cornered by Akebono's pushes and counterattacked with ineffective kicks and punches. Again, Akebono showed an unsportsmanlike side when he tried repeatedly to throw Roufus out of the ring, leading referee Cecil Peoples to warn him. At one point, Akebono even pushed away Peoples himself. Due to the fouls and to Roufus's incessant attacks, decision was given to the American.

The next month, Akebono faced Dutch striker Remy Bonjasky back in Japan. Ignoring his opponent's signature high kicks, Akebono pressed with punches and pushes, but Bonjasky kept dodging and attacking, even landing a sharp kick to the head by springing from the top rope. The bout transpired this way until the third round, when Bonjasky scored a roundhouse kick that knocked Akebono out.

At the end of the year, Akebono had his mixed martial arts debut against Ultimate Fighting Championship pioneer Royce Gracie at K-1 Premium 2004. The bout was not easy to negotiate, as Royce demanded it to be refereed by John McCarthy, former UFC referee and Gracie's trainee, or he would not fight. The yokozuna had trained now under Maz Tanaka and would be Gracie's biggest opponent, so some believed he could overcome the Brazilian jiu-jitsu groundwork by smothering him with his large size advantage. Come the match, Akebono charged toward Gracie and pushed him to the ground, where he passed his guard momentarily before the Brazilian escaped to his feet. Gracie then seized Akebono's arm and locked in an omoplata/wristlock combination, forcing a submission. Akebono was disappointed with his performance: "I did everything my trainers told me not to do."

==== 2005–2006 ====
In March 2005, Akebono was granted a place in the K-1 Korea Grand Prix, whose first round saw him facing Nobuaki Kakuda, a 44 years old Seidokaikan Karate fighter who usually refereed his matches. Through his usual strategy, Akebono surprisingly dominated the match, as Kakuda was unable to mount an offense. After wearing Kakuda down with knees and uppercuts while leaving him no space to counterattack, Akebono was given his first win by unanimous decision. He would advance round to face a fellow superheavyweight, Choi Hong-man, who had just defeated another former sumo wrestler in Wakashoyo. It would be the first time Akebono found an enemy capable to outwrestle him, given Choi's 350 pounds (160 kg) and strong ssireum background, and it showed when the Korean stopped Akebono's first charges, capitalizing too on his large reach to strike freely. The match was stopped at 24 seconds when Akebono's corner threw the towel.

Akebono and Choi rematched in July at K-1 Grand Prix event in Hawaii. Akebono lasted longer, but he found the same problems as the first time, with Choi scoring repeated jabs from the safety of his reach while he blocked the sumo's push and charge style. Akebono was eventually knocked down, and although he resumed his attack, Choi knocked him out to end the match. Akebono then returned to MMA format to end the year, going against former comedian Bobby Ologun at K-1 Premium. The sumo champion neutralized Ologun's striking by taking him down and smothering him during the earlier rounds, but he was later stunned by a barrage of punches and controlled for the rest of the match, losing the decision.

In 2006, Akebono had his third mixed martial arts match against another Ultimate Fighting Championship veteran, Don Frye, at K-1's Hero's 5 event. As usual, Akebono used his size, charging through Frye's punches and clinching him against the ropes and corners. He controlled the first round, but became fatigued at the second, moment in which Frye came back with punches, dropping Akebono multiple times. After some ground and pound, Frye locked a guillotine choke for the win. A rubber match between Akebono and Choi Hong-man happened then, in which would be Akebono's last bout under kickboxing rules. He tried his best to control the fight, but Choi did the same, delivering even a flying knee during the first round. At the last of the second round, the Korean landed a left hook that knocked Akebono out.

Akebono's last MMA match saw him meeting professional wrestler Giant Silva, another sizable opponent. The rikishi started the match pushing Silva against the ropes, both of them almost falling out of the ring due to the combined weight, but Silva interrupted his attack by locking a Kimura lock standing. Although they went to the mat with Akebono on top, Silva finally rolled him over and submitted him to the hold. With this last result, Akebono managed only one win in 14 bouts in his K-1 and mixed martial arts career. Because of this, he was referred to as "Makebono" (make meaning "lose" in Japanese) by some fight fans and magazines in Japan.

=== Rizin Fighting Federation ===
Akebono fought a rematch against Bob Sapp on 31 December 2015, at Rizin Fighting Federation Grand Prix event. He lost the fight by technical decision when a cut on his head could not be stemmed.

== Professional wrestling career ==
Akebono
Personal information
- Born: Chadwick Haheo Rowan; 8 May 1969 Waimānalo, Hawaii
- Died: April 2024 (aged 54) Tokyo, Japan

Professional wrestling career
- Ring name(s): Akebono; Bono-chan; Bono-kun; Bono Tiger; Great Bono; Monster Bono
- Billed height: 203 cm (80 in)
- Billed weight: 200 kg (441 lb)
- Trained by: Riki Choshu; Keiji Muto
- Debut: 31 March 2005
- Retired: 11 April 2017

=== World Wrestling Entertainment (2005) ===
On March 29, 2005, Akebono made an appearance on what would be the March 31, 2005 episode of SmackDown! in Houston, Texas, to accept the Big Show's challenge to a (kayfabe) sumo match at the WrestleMania 21 pay-per-view in Los Angeles, California. Akebono made his wrestling debut later that night, defeating jobber Eddie Vegas. At WrestleMania 21, Akebono defeated Big Show with a koshinage, throwing him entirely out of the ring.

On 1 July, Akebono made an appearance in a house show in Japan to help Big Show during a match against Carlito after Carlito's bodyguard Matt Morgan had interfered. The next day, Akebono teamed with Big Show to defeat Carlito and Morgan in a tag team match.

=== All Japan Pro Wrestling (2005–2007) ===
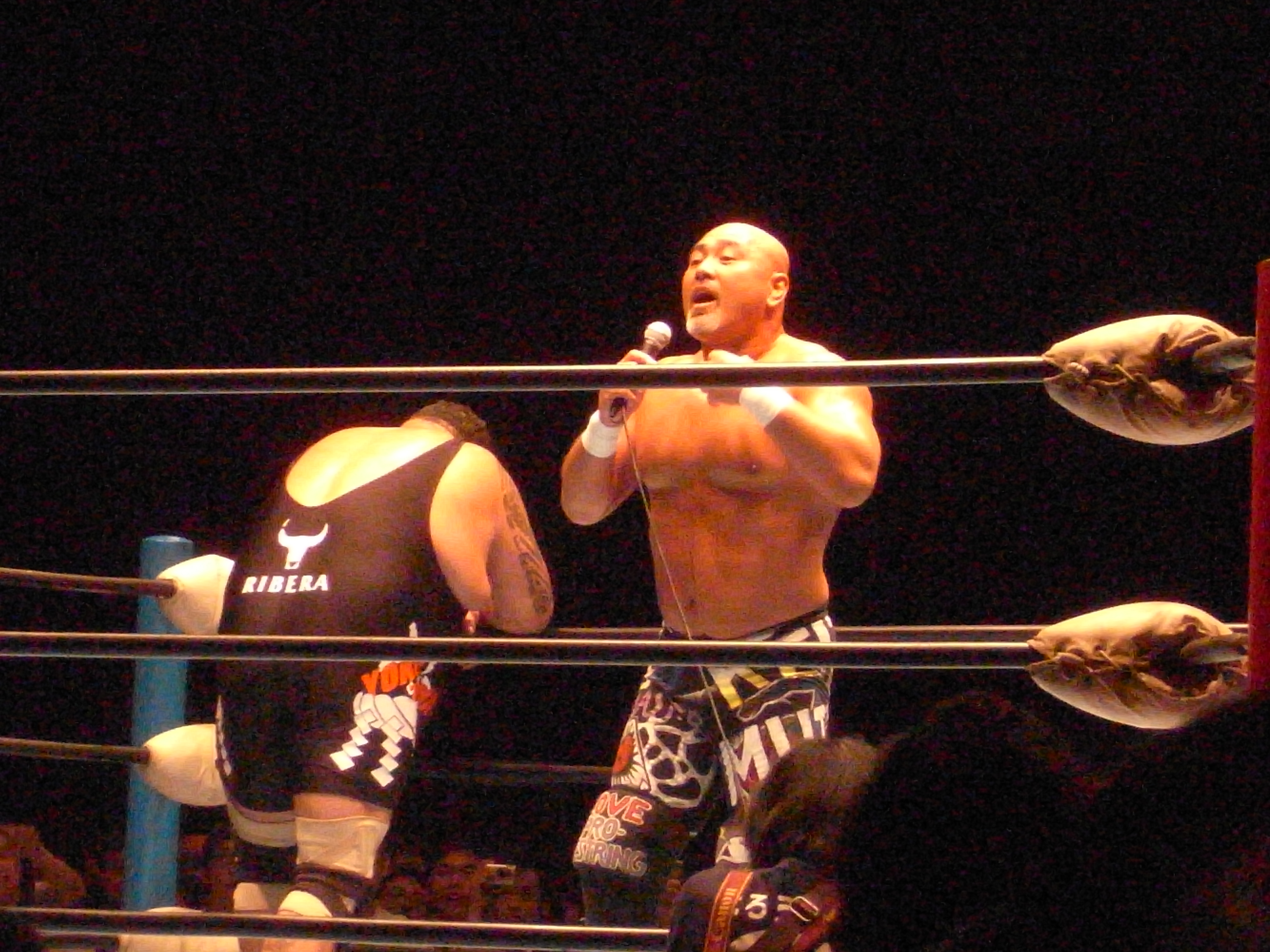
Akebono (left) and his mentor, Keiji Mutoh

On 4 August 2005, Akebono made his official wrestling debut in Japan, appearing at AJPW's Wrestle-1 event against the Great Muta in the first match of the Wrestle-1 Grand Prix Tournament, in a losing effort. The same month, it was announced that Akebono had been hired by AJPW and placed under the tutelage of Keiji Mutoh, the Great Muta's true identity. Akebono took on the role of Mutoh's enforcer and forming a tag team called "Mutoh Room" to combat the heel stable Voodoo-Murders. On 19 November, Akebono defeated Voodoo-Murders member Giant Bernard in a singles match. The same night, Akebono appeared in a match between The Great Muta and the imposter The Great Ruta to defend Muta from Voodoo-Murders, showing his own Muta impersonation called The Great Bono.

Later, Akebono and Mutoh competed in the Real World Tag League 2005, during the tournament, making it all the way to the finals, but were defeated by Team 3D. At the end of the year, Akebono won the Tokyo Sports award for "Rookie of the Year" and "Team of the Year" with Mutoh, who then stated that Akebono had successfully graduated from his lessons, and was then released from his contract to move to other companies and gain experience.

=== New Japan Pro Wrestling (2006–2007) ===
On 4 January 2006, Akebono appeared in New Japan Pro-Wrestling (NJPW) alongside Yutaka Yoshie in a match against Black Strong Machine and Hiro Saito, coming out victorious. Later that month, Akebono competed for Pro Wrestling NOAH, teaming up with his old friend Takeshi Rikio to defeat Junji Izumida and Kenta Kobashi. After the match, Akebono announced that he had been hired by NJPW and was congratulated by Rikio, promising to team again in the future, which never happened due to Rikio having to retire due to his injuries in 2010.

In February, Akebono made his official debut in New Japan as an ally of Riki Choshu, defeating then IWGP Tag Team Champions Cho-Ten (Masahiro Chono and Hiroyoshi Tenzan). On 19 March, he faced Brock Lesnar for the IWGP Heavyweight Championship, but was defeated when Lesnar got the pinfall after hitting him with the title. Months later, after the championship had become vacant, Akebono participated in a tournament for it, defeating Hiroyoshi Tenzan in the first round, but being eliminated by Giant Bernard in the second.

In October, Akebono and Choshu participated in the 2006 G1 Tag League, advancing to the last round before losing to Takashi Iizuka and Yuji Nagata. In August 2007, Akebono participated in the G1 Climax tournament, defeating Togi Makabe and Hiroyoshi Tenzan and completing the tournament with a 2-2-1 record. In October, Akebono and Masahiro Chono competed in the 2007 G1, beating Hirooki Goto and Milano Collection AT, Naofumi Yamamoto and Takashi Iizuka and Manabu Nakanishi and Yuji Nagata, but were eliminated in the final stage by Giant Bernard and Travis Tomko. During his stay at New Japan, Akebono began to show his comedic side and began imitating and parodying other fighters. On 13 September 2006, Akebono was presented with a tiger mask and the name of Bono Tiger to team with Tiger Mask IV. On 4 March 2007, he made a brief appearance in Michinoku Pro Wrestling as The Great Bonosuke, fighting on the side of The Great Sasuke wearing the same outfit. On 17 February 2007, Akebono briefly returned to All Japan Pro Wrestling to team with Toru Owashi against Jonidan (Nobutaka Araya) and SUMO Rikishi in an extravagant match between sumos, resulting in a win for his team. After training with Satoru Sayama (the original Tiger Mask) in MMA and pro wrestling, he returned to the New Japan ring to participate in the 2007 G1 Climax tournament. He defeated Togi Makabe and Hiroyoshi Tenzan but failed to progress to the semifinal stage.

=== Hustle (2007–2009) ===
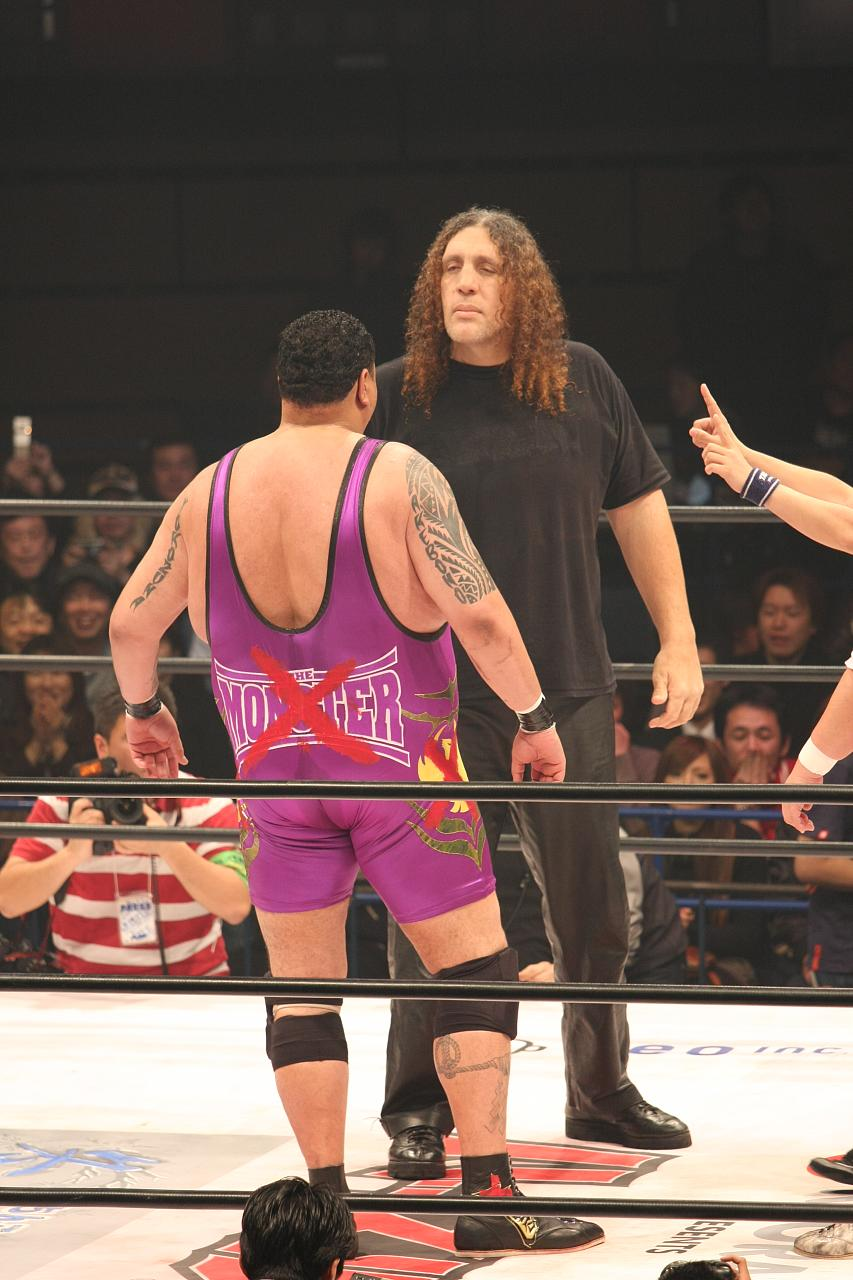
Akebono facing down Takada Monster Army member Giant Silva

Akebono performing the Yokozuna Press on Commander An Jo in Hustle

Akebono debuted in Hustle in 2007, being the storyline son of Yinling and The Great Muta. Under the name Monster Bono, Akebono was introduced being unrealistically born from a giant egg before easily defeating RG in his first bout. After that, Monster Bono (who had a simple, childlike personality), under the control of his mother, entered the service of Takada Monster Army and competed against several other wrestlers in a winning streak. Due to the constant abuse from Yinling, and wanting to meet his father, Monster Bono rebelled against it and left the Monster Army, changing his name to Bono-chan and allying with A-chan and Yoshie-chan to form a sumo-style face stable. Soon after, Yinling faced Bono-chan and demanded that he return to the Monster Army, but the outcome of the battle was a victory for Bono-chan, and Yinling (kayfabe) died under his weight. In retaliation to this, Toshiaki Kawada and Mr. Kawada (Toshiaki's elder father) scheduled a match between them and Bono and his father, The Great Muta, at Hustlemania 2008. Bono and Muta came victorious, but were attacked by The Esperanza, leading Muta to sacrifice himself to drag Esperanza to the underworld. Without his parents, Bono-chan changed his name to Bono-kun as a sign of maturity and joined the Hustle Army, making a promo based on that of Barack Obama campaign slogan "Yes, We Hustle". Later in Hustle Aid, before his scheduled match with Genichiro Tenryu against Arma & Geddon, Bono had a strange dream and transformed into The Great Bono, his last stage of maturity. After The Great Bono defeated their opponents with forcefulness, Hustle announced he was leaving to search for his father.

=== Dragon Gate (2008–2010) ===
On 21 September 2008, Akebono appeared in the Battle Royal of Dragon Gate's Storm Gate 2008 event, which was won by Akira Tozawa. Akebono made some more appearances, defeating the likes of Stalker Ichikawa, Don Fujii and Masaaki Mochizuki. That month, Akebono, Mochizuki and Fujii agreed to form a trio called Chou Zetsurins to face the team of World-1 (BxB Hulk, Masato Yoshino and PAC) for the Open the Triangle Gate Championship, but were defeated. On 14 October 2009, Chou Zetsurins finally won the title, and defended them until May 2010, when they were defeated by Deep Drunkers (Kzy, Takuya Sugawara and Yasushi Kanda).

=== Pro Wrestling Zero1 (2009–2013) ===
In March 2009, Akebono appeared in Pro Wrestling Zero1 defeating Kohei Sato. Later, Akebono joined the Sword Army stable, led by Masato Tanaka. Akebono also participated in the Fire Festival 2009 defeating several other wrestlers, but failed to win in the end. After that, he formed an irregular team with Shinjiro Otani called Kazan, which defeated Masaaki Mochizuki & Masato Tanaka in the final round of the Furinkazan tournament, as well winning the NWA Intercontinental Tag Team Championship on 24 January 2010 before vacating them on December of that year. On 3 February 2013, Akebono teamed with Daisuke Sekimoto to win the vacant championship by defeating Kohei Sato and Zeus.

=== Return to AJPW (2008–2015) ===
Akebono returned to AJPW, allying himself with Ryota Hama. On 23 September 2009, Akebono and Hama, known collectively as S.M.O.P. (Super Megaton Ohzumo Powers), won the All Asia Tag Team Championship, defeating Minoru Suzuki and Nosawa Rongai. S.M.O.P. also participated in the 2009 World's Strongest Tag Determination League, finishing 5th out of 9 teams with four victories and four defeats. S.M.O.P. would only defend the title once before losing them 7 months later to Voodoo-Murders members Big Daddy Voodoo and TARU. After that, Akebono split with Hama and became the enforcer for the group Partisan Forces (Minoru Suzuki, Masakatsu Funaki and Taiyo Kea) to continue his feud with the Voodoo-Murders. Partisan Forces broke up in June 2011, so Akebono reformed S.M.O.P. with Hama. After having an unsuccessful shot at KENSO and The Great Muta for the vacant World Tag Team Championship, Akebono and Hama entered a short feud with Big Daddy and Mazada, whom they defeated on several occasions, and also competed in the 2011 Real World Tag League, receiving two more chances for the All Asia Tag Team Championship against Daisuke Sekimoto and Yuji Okabayashi, lost both times. S.M.O.P. finally regained the All Asia title by defeating Sekimoto and Okabayashi on 1 July 2012, but vacated them on 4 September 2012, due to Akebono being sidelined with pneumonia. In November 2012, Akebono debuted his masked alter ego "Brazo de Bono", based on Brazo de Plata. On 1 September 2013, Akebono signed a contract with All Japan, officially ending his freelancing days. On 11 September, Akebono entered the 2013 Ōdō Tournament and, in his first match under an All Japan contract, defeated former Triple Crown Heavyweight Champion Jun Akiyama, unveiling his new finishing maneuver, Yokozuna Impact, in the process. After wins over Low Ki and Bambi Killer, Akebono reached the finals, where, on 23 September, he defeated Go Shiozaki to win the tournament. On 27 October, Akebono defeated Suwama to win the Triple Crown Heavyweight Championship for the first time. Akebono made his first successful title defense on 24 November against Joe Doering. His second successful defense took place on 3 January 2014, against Takao Omori. On 23 February, Akebono made his third successful title defense against Go Shiozaki. Akebono's fourth title defense took place on 18 March, when he defeated Kento Miyahara. In April, Akebono looked to enter a rare group of men who have won the Champion Carnival, while holding the Triple Crown Championship, but on 22 April, after securing the top spot in his block, Akebono was forced to pull out of the tournament and forfeit his two remaining matches, after being hospitalized with poor health. On 30 May, Akebono officially relinquished the Triple Crown Heavyweight Championship due to his health issues. On 27 July, it was announced that Akebono had been appointed to All Japan's board of directors. Akebono wrestled his return match on 16 August. On 30 August, Akebono received his rematch for the Triple Crown Heavyweight Championship, but was defeated by the defending champion, Joe Doering.

On 22 March 2015, Akebono won the World Tag Team Championship for the second time, when he and Yutaka Yoshie defeated Jun Akiyama and Takao Omori. On 25 April, Akebono defeated Suwama in the finals to win All Japan's premier tournament, the Champion Carnival. In the build-up to Akebono's challenge for the Triple Crown Heavyweight Championship against Go Shiozaki, he and Yoshie lost the World Tag Team Championship to Shiozaki and Kento Miyahara on 6 May. On 21 May, Akebono defeated Shiozaki to win the Triple Crown Heavyweight Championship for the second time. Akebono eventually went on to lose the championship to Jun Akiyama in his third defense on 1 November 2015. The following day, it was announced that Akebono was leaving All Japan and once again becoming a freelancer, looking to return to martial arts. It was also announced that he would continue working for All Japan as a freelancer.

=== Ōdō (2015–2017) ===
On 4 December 2015, Akebono announced he was forming a new company named Ōdō. He would serve as its president with the backing of Motoko Baba, the widow of All Japan founder Giant Baba. On 13 March 2016, Akebono made his debut for AJPW splinter promotion Wrestle-1, reuniting with SMOP partner Ryota Hama. Ōdō held its first event on 20 April in Korakuen Hall. The main event of the show saw Akebono, Ryota Hama and Taiyo Kea defeat Daisuke Sekimoto, Masato Tanaka and Yuji Okabayashi. In early June, Akebono took part in the Lucha Libre World Cup in Mexico. On 16 September, Ōdō formed a partnership with Pro Wrestling Zero1.

Akebono's last recorded match happened on 11 April 2017, for Dramatic Dream Team, where he teamed with Yasu Urano and Harashima and lost to fellow former Triple Crown champion Yoshihiro Takayama and his team with Yuto Aijima and Shigehiro Irie. Following Akebono's heart disability in April 2017 (below), and Motoko Baba's death on 14 April 2018, Ōdō became an inactive promotion.

== Personal life ==
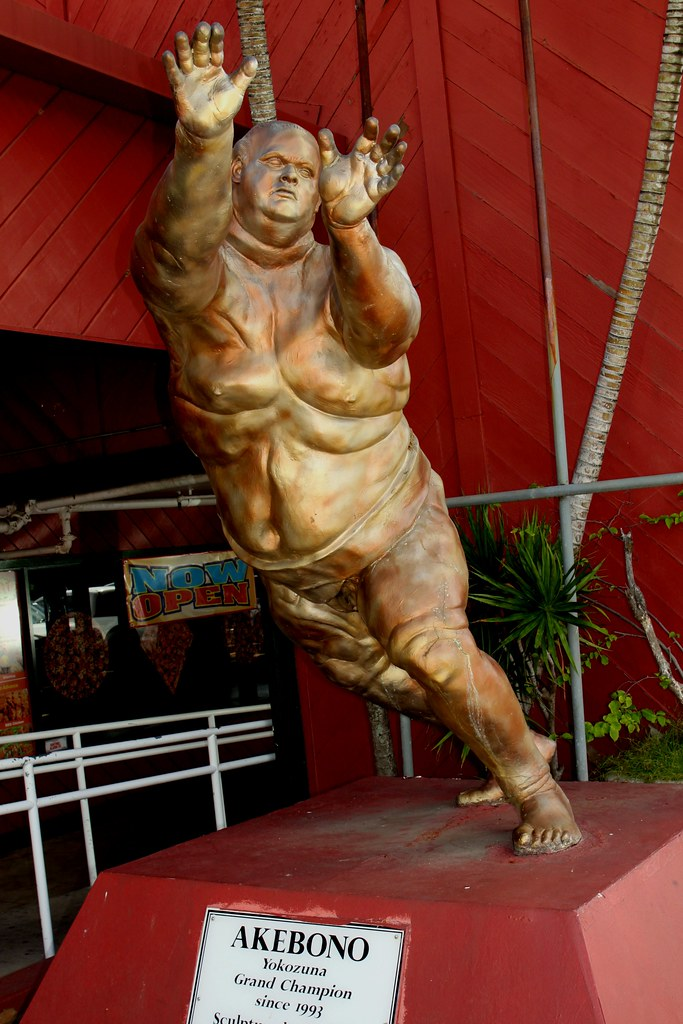
Statue of Akebono in its original location in Waimānalo, Hawaii

Akebono was born to Randy, a taxi driver of Irish and Native Hawaiian descent and Janice, an office worker of Cuban and Native Hawaiian descent. He became a Japanese citizen in 1996, giving up his American citizenship and changing his legal name from Chad Rowan to Akebono Tarō, saying "Changing my nationality has nothing to do with who I am, just like I am still my mother's son even after I became a Japanese [citizen]."

At the end of 1996, he was engaged to Yu Aihara, a television tarento, but broke it off the following year. In February 1998, Akebono announced his engagement to Christiane Reiko Kalina, a teacher who is of Japanese and American descent. They married in September 1998 and have two sons and a daughter.

In April 2017, he was hospitalized after feeling unwell while on a wrestling tour in Kitakyushu. Early reports indicated that he had been placed in a medically-induced coma after suffering a cardiac condition, but his family later released a statement on Akebono's website criticizing "misleading" articles and saying he was undergoing treatment "due to a right leg cellulitis and an infection." A family spokesperson thanked Akebono's fans for their support, saying "The number of messages from around the world has been overwhelming."

The Wrestling Observer Newsletter reported that the original story was correct and the cellulitis claim was a cover story for a serious heart issue. Akebono's wife confirmed in March 2018 that her husband had suffered acute heart failure and had been in a medically induced coma for two weeks. He lost nearly 130 pounds or 60 kilograms, much of it in muscle, and still could not walk, requiring a wheelchair. He was to begin intensive physical therapy.

On 2 January 2019, it was reported that he had lost the use of his legs and suffered from partial memory loss, unable to remember his pro-wrestling days. For a short period, he was unable to speak without the aid of his wife.

Although still unable to walk, he attended a memorial service for his former tsukebito Ushiomaru at Azumazeki stable in December 2019.

Akebono died of heart failure in April 2024 at age 54 after being admitted to a hospital in Tokyo. His death was announced on the morning of April 11 in Japan, and a funeral was held in Tokyo three days later. Akebono's widow Christiane Reiko told reporters after the funeral that he had suffered from arrhythmia for seven years. She also said that Akebono's body would be cremated, with half of his ashes remaining with his family in Japan and the other half placed into the ocean off of the Hawaiian coast.

== Career record ==
Akebono Tarō
Year	January Hatsu basho, Tokyo	March Haru basho, Osaka	May Natsu basho, Tokyo	July Nagoya basho, Nagoya	September Aki basho, Tokyo	November Kyūshū basho, Fukuoka
1988	x	(Maezumō)	East Jonokuchi #19; 6–1	East Jonidan #97; 5–2	East Jonidan #52; 5–2	West Jonidan #15; 6–1
1989	East Sandanme #60; 5–2	East Sandanme #33; 6–1	West Makushita #55; 6–1	East Makushita #28; 5–2	West Makushita #14; 5–2	East Makushita #5; 5–2
1990	East Makushita #2; 4–3	West Jūryō #12; 8–7	West Jūryō #10; 11–4	East Jūryō #3; 11–4	East Maegashira #14; 9–6	West Maegashira #7; 9–6; F
1991	West Maegashira #1; 8–7; O★	East Komusubi #1; 8–7; O	West Sekiwake #1; 7–8	West Maegashira #1; 8–7 ★★	West Komusubi #1; 7–8	West Maegashira #1; 8–7 ★
1992	West Komusubi #1; 13–2; OF	East Sekiwake #1; 8–7	West Sekiwake #1; 13–2; O	East Ōzeki #1; Sat out due to injury 0–0–15	East Ōzeki #2; 9–6	West Ōzeki #1; 14–1
1993	East Ōzeki #1; 13–2	East Yokozuna #1; 10–5	East Yokozuna #1; 13–2	East Yokozuna #1; 13–2–PP	East Yokozuna #1; 14–1	East Yokozuna #1; 13–2–P
1994	East Yokozuna #1; 11–4	East Yokozuna #1; 12–3–PP	East Yokozuna #1; 10–2–3	East Yokozuna #1; Sat out due to injury 0–0–15	East Yokozuna #1; Sat out due to injury 0–0–15	East Yokozuna #1; 10–5
1995	West Yokozuna #1; 12–3	West Yokozuna #1; 14–1	East Yokozuna #1; 13–2	West Yokozuna #1; 11–4	West Yokozuna #1; 12–3	West Yokozuna #1; 7–3–5
1996	West Yokozuna #1; 0–3–12	West Yokozuna #1; Sat out due to injury 0–0–15	West Yokozuna #1; 10–5	West Yokozuna #1; 12–3	West Yokozuna #1; 10–5	West Yokozuna #1; 11–4–P
1997	East Yokozuna #1; 12–3	West Yokozuna #1; 12–3–PP	West Yokozuna #1; 13–2–P	West Yokozuna #1; 12–3	West Yokozuna #1; 9–6	West Yokozuna #1; Sat out due to injury 0–0–15
1998	West Yokozuna #1; 10–5	East Yokozuna #1; 13–2	East Yokozuna #1; 10–5	East Yokozuna #1; 11–4	West Yokozuna #1; 10–5	East Yokozuna #2; Sat out due to injury 0–0–15
1999	East Yokozuna #2; Sat out due to injury 0–0–15	East Yokozuna #2; Sat out due to injury 0–0–15	East Yokozuna #2; 11–4	East Yokozuna #1; 13–2–P	East Yokozuna #1; 2–2–11	East Yokozuna #2; Sat out due to injury 0–0–15
2000	West Yokozuna #2; 11–4	West Yokozuna #1; 12–3	East Yokozuna #1; 13–2	East Yokozuna #1; 13–2	East Yokozuna #1; 13–2	West Yokozuna #1; 14–1
2001	East Yokozuna #1; Retired; 0–0–15	x	x	x	x	x
Record given as wins–losses–absences Top division champion Top division runner-up Retired Non-participation Jūryō Lower divisions Sanshō key: F=Fighting spirit; O=Outstanding performance; T=Technique Also shown: ★=Kinboshi; P=Playoff(s); Divisions: Makuuchi — Jūryō — Makushita — Sandanme — Jonidan — Jonokuchi Makuuchi ranks: Yokozuna — Ōzeki — Sekiwake — Komusubi — Maegashira

== Kickboxing record ==
Akebono Tarō kickboxing record: 1 win, 9 losses
Result	Record	Opponent	Method	Event	Date	Round	Time	Location	Notes
Loss	1–9	(United States) Bob Sapp	Technical decision	Rizin Fighting Federation 2	31 December 2015	2	0:49	Saitama, Saitama, Japan	Shoot boxing rules.
Loss	1–8	(South Korea) Choi Hong-man	KO (left hook)	K-1 World Grand Prix 2006 in Sapporo	30 July 2006	2	0:57	Sapporo, Japan	
Loss	1–7	(South Korea) Choi Hong-man	TKO (referee stoppage)	K-1 World Grand Prix 2005 in Hawaii	29 July 2005	1	2:52	Honolulu, Hawaii, US	
Loss	1–6	(South Korea) Choi Hong-man	TKO (corner stoppage)	K-1 World Grand Prix 2005 in Seoul	19 March 2005	1	0:24	Seoul, South Korea	K-1 Korea Grand Prix semifinal.
Win	1–5	(Japan) Nobuaki Kakuda	Decision (unanimous)	K-1 World Grand Prix 2005 in Seoul	19 March 2005	3	3:00	Seoul, South Korea	K-1 Korea Grand Prix opening round.
Loss	0–5	(Netherlands) Remy Bonjasky	KO (right high kick)	K-1 World Grand Prix 2004 Final Elimination	25 September 2004	3	0:33	Tokyo, Japan	
Loss	0–4	(United States) Rick Roufus	Decision (unanimous)	K-1 World Grand Prix 2004 in Las Vegas II	7 August 2004	3	3:00	Las Vegas, Nevada, US	
Loss	0–3	(China) Zhang Qingjun	Extra round decision (unanimous)	K-1 World Grand Prix 2004 in Seoul	17 July 2004	4	3:00	Seoul, South Korea	K-1 Korea Prix opening round.
Loss	0–2	(Japan) Musashi	Decision (unanimous)	K-1 World Grand Prix 2004 in Saitama	27 March 2004	3	3:00	Saitama, Japan	
Loss	0–1	(United States) Bob Sapp	KO (right hook)	K-1 PREMIUM 2003 Dynamite!!	31 December 2003	1	1:55	Nagoya, Japan	

Legend
Win
Loss
Draw/No contest

== Mixed martial arts record ==
Professional record breakdown
4 matches	0 wins	4 losses
By submission	0	3
By decision	0	1

Akebono Tarō mixed martial arts career statistics
Res.	Record	Opponent	Method	Event	Date	Round	Time	Location	Notes
Loss	0–4	Paulo Cesar Silva	Submission (kimura)	K-1 PREMIUM 2006 Dynamite!!	31 December 2006	1	1:02	Osaka, Japan	
Loss	0–3	Don Frye	Submission (guillotine choke)	Hero's 5	3 May 2006	2	3:50	Tokyo, Japan	
Loss	0–2	Bobby Ologun	Decision (unanimous)	K-1 Premium 2005 Dynamite	31 December 2005	3	5:00	Osaka, Japan	
Loss	0–1	Royce Gracie	Submission (omoplata)	K-1 PREMIUM 2004 Dynamite!!	31 December 2004	1	2:13	Osaka, Japan	

Legend: Win Loss Draw/No contest

== Championships and accomplishments ==
=== Professional wrestling ===
- All Japan Pro Wrestling
  - All Asia Tag Team Championship (2 times) – with Ryota Hama
  - Triple Crown Heavyweight Championship (2 times)
  - World Tag Team Championship (2 times) – with Taiyo Kea (1) and Yutaka Yoshie (1)
  - Champion Carnival (2015)
  - 2 January Korakuen Hall Heavyweight Battle Royal (2010, 2015)
  - Ōdō Tournament (2013)
- Dragon Gate
  - Dragon Gate Open the Triangle Gate Championship (1 time) – with Masaaki Mochizuki and Don Fujii
- DDT Pro-Wrestling
  - KO-D 6-Man Tag Team Championship (1 time) – with Sanshiro Takagi and Toru Owashi
- Pro Wrestling Illustrated
  - Ranked No. 115 of the top 500 wrestlers in the PWI 500 in 2006
- Pro Wrestling Zero1
  - NWA Intercontinental Tag Team Championship (3 times) – with Shinjiro Otani (1), Daisuke Sekimoto (1) and Shogun Okamoto (1)
  - NWA Pan-Pacific Premium Heavyweight Championship (1 time)
  - World Heavyweight Championship (1 time)
  - Furinkazan (2009) – with Shinjiro Otani
- Tokyo Sports
  - Best Tag Team Award (2005) with Keiji Mutoh
  - Best Tag Team Award (2009) with Ryota Hama
  - Newcomer Award (2005)

=== Other accomplishments ===
- Black Belt
  - 1993 Competitor of the Year

== See also ==
- Glossary of sumo terms
- List of non-Japanese sumo wrestlers
- List of past sumo wrestlers
- List of sumo record holders
- List of sumo tournament top division champions
- List of sumo tournament top division runners-up
- List of the heaviest sumo wrestlers
- List of yokozuna

Preceded by Asahifuji Seiya	64th Yokozuna; 1993–2001	Succeeded by Takanohana Kōji
Yokozuna is not a successive rank, and more than one wrestler can hold the title at once
