= Jingaku Takashi =

Japanese sumo wrestler

Personal information
- Native name: 陣岳 隆
- Born: Takashi Nakayama; 24 December 1959 (age 66) Shibushi, Kagoshima, Japan
- Height: 1.88 m (6 ft 2 in)
- Weight: 142 kg (313 lb)

Sport
- Sport: Sumo
- Retired: September, 1991
- Heya: Izutsu
- Record: 499-538-13
- Debut: May, 1977
- Highest rank: Komusubi (November, 1987)
- Elder name: See retirement
- Gold Stars: 2 (Kitanoumi, Ōnokuni)
- Updated on June 25, 2020

Jingaku Takashi (born 24 December 1959 as Takashi Nakayama) is a former sumo wrestler from Shibushi, Kagoshima, Japan. He made his professional debut in May 1977, and reached the top division in January 1983. His highest rank was komusubi and he earned two kinboshi. He retired in September 1991.

== Career ==
He came from the same area of Japan as future stable-mates Sakahoko and Terao. He was fond of kendo at school. He joined Izutsu stable in 1977, and first reached a sekitori rank in July 1982 when he was promoted to the jūryō division. He first made the top makuuchi division in January 1983 but posted a losing record of 4–11 and so was immediately demoted. He won promotion back to the top division in January 1984, and remained there for virtually all of the rest of his career. In September 1984 he defeated a yokozuna for the first time when he upset Kitanoumi in one of the latter's final tournaments. He made the san'yaku ranks for the first time in November 1987 when he reached komusubi, but he proved to be out of his depth and scored only two wins against thirteen losses. He made komusubi once more in September 1990 at the age of 30, but again struggled, winning only three bouts. He suffered from stage fright, losing weight during tournaments because of stomach upsets. This affected his performance against top ranked wrestlers – he stumbled out of the dohyō in a match against Hokutoumi in September 1990 with his opponent barely having to touch him. He was restricted by a foot problem as well as digestive illness towards the end of his career. After 46 consecutive tournaments in the top division he was demoted to juryo after scoring only 4-11 at maegashira 15 in the July 1991 tournament, and he pulled out of the following tournament with a knee injury after fighting only one match. This brought to an end his streak of 1036 consecutive matches from sumo entry. He announced his retirement shortly afterwards.

== Retirement from sumo ==
Jingaku was for one year an elder of the Japan Sumo Association under the name Kasugayama-oyakata, but he was only borrowing the elder name from his stable-mate Sakahoko, and when Sakahoko retired in September 1992 Jingaku was unable to acquire stock elsewhere and had to leave the sumo world. He subsequently worked at a fish processing company.

== Fighting style ==
Jingaku was an exponent of tsuppari, a series of rapid thrusts to the opponent's chest, for which his Izutsu stable was famous, and often won by tsuki-dashi or thrust out. He used a migi-yotsu, or left hand outside, right hand inside grip when fighting on his opponent's mawashi or belt, and yori-kiri (force out) was his most common winning kimarite. He was also known for using tsuri (lifting) techniques, and utchari, the ring edge pivot.

== Personal life ==
Since leaving sumo he has reverted to his birth name, Takashi Nakayama. He is married with two daughters and a son. In his free time he is a keen golfer.

== Career record ==
Jingaku Takashi
Year	January Hatsu basho, Tokyo	March Haru basho, Osaka	May Natsu basho, Tokyo	July Nagoya basho, Nagoya	September Aki basho, Tokyo	November Kyūshū basho, Fukuoka
1977	x	x	(Maezumo)	West Jonokuchi #12; 6–1–P	West Jonidan #63; 4–3	East Jonidan #39; 4–3
1978	West Jonidan #20; 5–2	East Sandanme #71; 3–4	East Sandanme #84; 4–3	West Sandanme #69; 5–2	East Sandanme #42; 6–1	West Makushita #57; 2–5
1979	East Sandanme #20; 2–5	West Sandanme #44; 6–1	East Makushita #58; 4–3	East Makushita #48; 1–6	East Sandanme #19; 5–2	East Makushita #57; 6–1
1980	West Makushita #27; 2–5	East Makushita #45; 4–3	West Makushita #38; 5–2	West Makushita #23; 3–4	West Makushita #30; 4–3	East Makushita #23; 4–3
1981	West Makushita #15; 3–4	East Makushita #22; 4–3	West Makushita #11; 3–4	West Makushita #16; 2–5	East Makushita #38; 6–1	West Makushita #17; 5–2
1982	East Makushita #8; 4–3	East Makushita #5; 5–2	East Makushita #1; 5–2	East Jūryō #11; 8–7	East Jūryō #8; 9–6	East Jūryō #4; 10–5
1983	East Maegashira #13; 4–11	West Jūryō #5; 6–9	West Jūryō #7; 7–8	East Jūryō #9; 8–7	West Jūryō #8; 9–6	West Jūryō #4; 11–4–P
1984	West Maegashira #12; 9–6	West Maegashira #5; 5–10	East Maegashira #12; 9–6	East Maegashira #7; 8–7	West Maegashira #3; 5–10 ★	East Maegashira #10; 8–7
1985	West Maegashira #6; 8–7	West Maegashira #2; 6–9	East Maegashira #5; 6–9	West Maegashira #8; 8–7	West Maegashira #1; 5–10	East Maegashira #9; 8–7
1986	East Maegashira #3; 7–8	West Maegashira #4; 7–8	West Maegashira #5; 8–7	West Maegashira #1; 6–9	West Maegashira #4; 5–10	East Maegashira #9; 8–7
1987	East Maegashira #5; 6–9	East Maegashira #8; 8–7	East Maegashira #3; 3–12	West Maegashira #10; 8–7	West Maegashira #5; 9–6	East Komusubi #1; 2–13
1988	East Maegashira #11; 8–7	East Maegashira #7; 8–7	West Maegashira #3; 6–9	East Maegashira #6; 7–8	West Maegashira #7; 8–7	East Maegashira #3; 5–10
1989	East Maegashira #7; 8–7	East Maegashira #4; 7–8	West Maegashira #5; 8–7	West Maegashira #2; 6–9	West Maegashira #5; 8–7	West Maegashira #1; 3–12
1990	West Maegashira #9; 9–6	East Maegashira #3; 4–11	West Maegashira #8; 8–7	West Maegashira #4; 8–7	West Komusubi #1; 3–12	East Maegashira #9; 9–6
1991	West Maegashira #3; 6–9 ★	West Maegashira #7; 8–7	West Maegashira #3; 2–13	West Maegashira #15; 4–11	West Jūryō #3; Retired; 0–2–13	x
Record given as wins–losses–absences Top division champion Top division runner-up Retired Lower divisions Non-participation Sanshō key: F=Fighting spirit; O=Outstanding performance; T=Technique Also shown: ★=Kinboshi; P=Playoff(s); Divisions: Makuuchi — Jūryō — Makushita — Sandanme — Jonidan — Jonokuchi Makuuchi ranks: Yokozuna — Ōzeki — Sekiwake — Komusubi — Maegashira

== See also ==
- Glossary of sumo terms
- List of past sumo wrestlers
- List of komusubi
