= Nishinoumi Kajirō =

There have been three sumo wrestlers named Nishinoumi Kajirō:

- Nishinoumi Kajirō I (1855-1908) the 16th yokozuna
- Nishinoumi Kajirō II (1880-1931) the 25th yokozuna
- Nishinoumi Kajirō III (1890-1933) the 30th yokozuna
