= Kitanofuji Katsuaki =

Japanese sumo wrestler (1942–2024)

Personal information
- Native name: 北の富士 勝昭
- Born: Takezawa Katsuaki; March 28, 1942 Hokkaido, Japan
- Died: November 12, 2024 (aged 82) Tokyo, Japan
- Height: 1.85 m (6 ft 1 in)
- Weight: 135 kg (298 lb)

Sport
- Sport: Sumo
- Retired: July 1974
- Heya: Dewanoumi → Kokonoe
- Record: 784–426–69
- Debut: January 1957
- Highest rank: Yokozuna (January 1970)
- Elder name: Izutsu → Kokonoe → Jinmaku
- Championships: 10 (Makuuchi); 1 (Jūryō)
- Special Prizes: Outstanding Performance (2); Fighting Spirit (1); Technique (3)
- Gold Stars: 1 (Taihō)

Kitanofuji Katsuaki (Japanese: 北の富士 勝昭; March 28, 1942 – November 12, 2024, born Takezawa Katsuaki (竹澤 勝昭)) was a Japanese professional sumo wrestler from Asahikawa, Hokkaidō. He made his professional debut in 1957, reaching the top makuuchi division in 1964. He was the sport's 52nd yokozuna, a rank he attained in 1970. He won ten tournament championships and was known for his rivalry with Tamanoumi. He retired in 1974 and was the head coach of Kokonoe stable from 1977 to 1992. He left the Japan Sumo Association in 1998, but was still prominent in the sumo world as a commentator in his later years.

== Career ==
Kitanofuji began his professional career in January 1957 at the age of 14 and joined Dewanoumi stable. In November 1963 he achieved a perfect 15–0 score in the second highest jūryō division (a feat not equalled until 43 years later by Baruto) and was promoted to the top makuuchi division. In his debut top division tournament in January 1964 he scored 13 wins, although he faced only his fellow maegashira. He won the Fighting Spirit award and was promoted straight to komusubi. By 1966 he was firmly established in the san'yaku ranks at sekiwake. He reached ōzeki rank in July 1966. Although he had won only 28 bouts in the previous three tournaments (at least 33 are normally needed), Yutakayama was the only ōzeki at the time, and he was promoted largely because of his potential.

In January 1967 he followed the coach who had scouted him, former yokozuna Chiyonoyama, to a new stable, Kokonoe. His first tournament championship came in March of that year. Kitanofuji was competing in an era dominated by Taihō, but he emerged from the great yokozuna's shadow by winning consecutive championships in November 1969 and January 1970 to secure his own promotion to yokozuna. Promoted alongside him was his friend and rival Tamanoumi. His first title as a yokozuna came in May 1970. After a run of relatively mediocre 11–4 marks he won in May 1971 with a perfect record and he took two other championships that year.

However, Tamanoumi's sudden death in October 1971 shook Kitanofuji badly and affected his performance in the ring. Now the sole yokozuna in sumo, he went into a slump. After poor performances in the first two tournaments of 1972, he pulled out of the May 1972 tournament because of insomnia. He took a leave of absence from the next tournament in July, but went on a trip to Hawaii and was caught surfboarding. He was cautioned by the Japan Sumo Association and immediately apologised. He returned to win the next championship with a perfect record in September 1972. His final title came in March 1973, and his last challenge for a championship was in July of that year when he lost a playoff to veteran Kotozakura.

After several more absences Kitanofuji announced his retirement at the age of 32 three days into the July 1974 tournament, acknowledging that there was now a new era being led by Wajima and Kitanoumi, both several years younger than himself. Kotozakura retired in the same week, and Kitanoumi was promoted to yokozuna after the tournament ended. Kitanofuji's total of ten tournament championships was, at the time, behind only Futabayama's 12 and Taiho's 32.

== Retirement from sumo ==
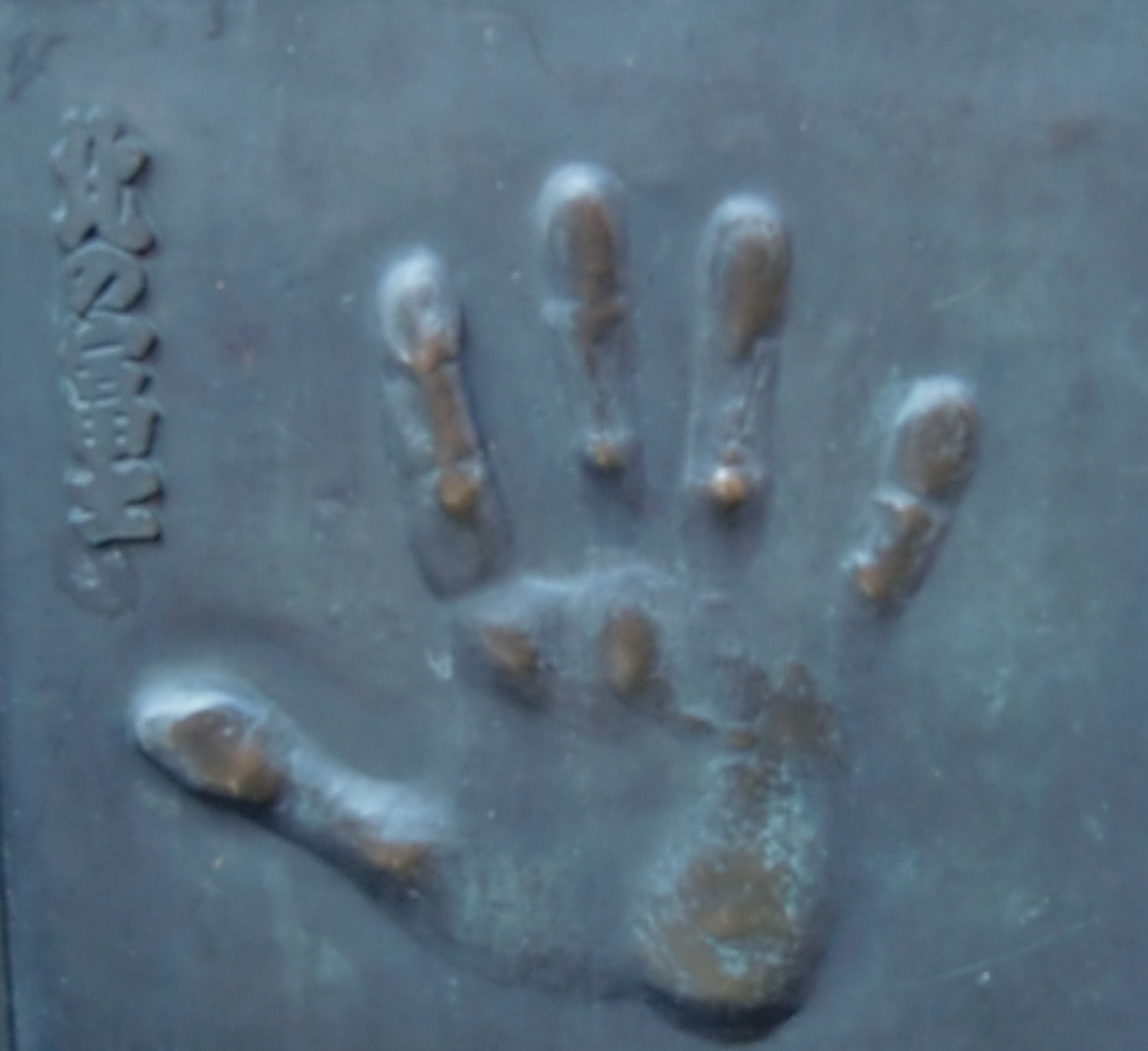
Kitanofuji's handprint displayed on a monument in Ryōgoku, Tokyo

Kitanofuji remained in the Japan Sumo Association after his retirement, initially under the name of Izutsu. Shortly after retiring he branched out and set up his own Izutsu stable. In 1977, however, he became head of the Kokonoe stable of wrestlers following Chiyonoyama's death, and merged his stable back into Kokonoe. He gave the Izutsu name to former sekiwake Tsurugamine and adopted the Kokonoe name. During his tenure as head of Kokonoe stable both Chiyonofuji and Hokutoumi reached the rank of yokozuna, and he produced a number of other top division wrestlers such as Takanofuji and Tomoefuji. He handed over control of the stable to Chiyonofuji in April 1992, but he remained an oyakata under the name Jinmaku. In September 1993 he left Kokonoe stable and joined his former wrestler Hokutoumi's newly established Hakkaku stable. In February 1998 he failed to be re-elected to the Sumo Association's Board of Directors, and citing the lack of support from his fellow oyakata in the Takasago ichimon or group of stables, he decided to leave the organisation several years before the mandatory retirement age. He appeared on television as a sumo analyst for NHK's grand tournament broadcasts, and also wrote sumo commentary for the Chunichi Shimbun newspaper. In 2002, he performed his kanreki dohyō-iri or '60th year ring entrance ceremony' to commemorate his years as yokozuna.

In January 2017 he took a break from sumo commentary in order to recuperate from heart surgery. In 2023, Kitanofuji continued to work as a commentator, at the age of 80, remaining in the public eye despite being outside of the Sumo Association for many years. However, he took a leave of absence from his commentary duties in March for health reasons. In September, his former student Hakkaku (former yokozuna Hokutoumi) reported at his own kanreki dohyō-iri that Kitanofuji had been hospitalized on September 2. At the start of the July 2024 tournament Kitanofuji briefly appeared on the NHK sumo broadcast in a pre-recorded video, in what would be his last on-camera appearance.

== Death ==
Kitanofuji died at a hospital in Tokyo, on November 12, 2024, at the age of 82. His death was announced on November 20, the same day that his funeral was held in private.

On December 18, 2024, a memorial for Kitanofuji was held at Hakkaku stable. Japan Sumo Association chairman Hakkaku said in his speech that he would do all he could to preserve and pass on the tradition of sumo to future generations, as a way of showing gratitude to his former stablemaster.

== Fighting style ==
Kitanofuji's favoured grip was hidari-yotsu (a right hand outside, left hand inside grip on his opponent's mawashi), and his favoured techniques were yori. His most common kimarite (winning techniques) were yorikiri (force out), sotogake (outer leg trip), uwatenage (overarm throw), and hatakikomi (slap down).

== Career record ==
- The Nagoya tournament was first held in 1958.

Kitanofuji Katsuaki
Year	January Hatsu basho, Tokyo	March Haru basho, Osaka	May Natsu basho, Tokyo	July Nagoya basho, Nagoya	September Aki basho, Tokyo	November Kyūshū basho, Fukuoka
1957	(Maezumo)	Shinjo; 2–1	East Jonidan #131; 3–5	Not held	East Jonidan #123; 4–4	West Jonidan #104; 4–4
1958	East Jonidan #91; 6–2	West Jonidan #58; 1–7	West Jonidan #76; 6–2	East Jonidan #39; 3–5	West Jonidan #46; 2–6	West Jonidan #61; 5–3
1959	East Jonidan #48; 6–2	East Jonidan #16; 6–2	East Sandanme #93; 6–2	East Sandanme #65; 2–6	West Sandanme #78; 3–5	West Sandanme #83; 3–5
1960	West Sandanme #94; 7–1–P	West Sandanme #51; 4–4	West Sandanme #48; 4–4	East Sandanme #47; 2–5	West Sandanme #67; Sat out due to injury 0–0–7	West Sandanme #102; 6–1
1961	East Sandanme #62; 5–2	East Sandanme #27; 4–3	West Sandanme #14; 5–2	West Makushita #81; 6–1	West Makushita #54; 2–5	East Makushita #70; 5–2
1962	West Makushita #45; 5–2	West Makushita #32; 4–3	West Makushita #29; 6–1	East Makushita #11; 3–4	West Makushita #12; 3–4	West Makushita #15; 6–1
1963	West Makushita #4; 6–1	West Jūryō #18; 9–6	East Jūryō #11; 10–5	East Jūryō #6; 4–11	East Jūryō #17; 11–4	West Jūryō #5; 15–0; Champion
1964	East Maegashira #10; 13–2; F	East Komusubi #1; 4–11	East Maegashira #5; 9–6; T	West Sekiwake #1; 9–6	East Sekiwake #1; 6–9	East Maegashira #1; 10–5; T
1965	West Sekiwake #1; 8–7	West Sekiwake #1; 5–10	East Maegashira #3; 8–7 ★	East Maegashira #2; 8–7	East Komusubi #1; 10–5	East Sekiwake #1; 9–6
1966	East Sekiwake #1; 10–5; O	East Sekiwake #1; 8–7; O	East Sekiwake #1; 10–5; T	East Sekiwake #1; 10–5	West Ōzeki #1; 10–5	East Ōzeki #1; 10–5
1967	East Ōzeki #1; 10–5	East Ōzeki #1; 14–1	East Ōzeki #1; 5–10	West Ōzeki #1; 7–8	West Ōzeki #2; 10–5	East Ōzeki #1; 8–7
1968	East Ōzeki #2; 10–5	West Ōzeki #1; 9–6	West Ōzeki #2; 10–5	East Ōzeki #2; 10–5	East Ōzeki #2; 8–7	West Ōzeki #1; 11–4
1969	West Ōzeki #1; 11–4	West Ōzeki #1; 9–6	East Ōzeki #2; 9–6	West Ōzeki #1; 9–6	East Ōzeki #2; 12–3	West Ōzeki #1; 13–2
1970	East Ōzeki #1; 13–2–P	East Yokozuna #1; 13–2	West Yokozuna #1; 14–1	East Yokozuna #1; 13–2–P	East Yokozuna #1; 11–4	East Yokozuna #2; 11–4
1971	East Yokozuna #2; 11–4	East Yokozuna #2; 11–4	East Yokozuna #2; 15–0	East Yokozuna #1; 8–7	West Yokozuna #1; 15–0	East Yokozuna #1; 13–2
1972	East Yokozuna #1; 7–7–1	East Yokozuna #1; 9–6	East Yokozuna #1; 3–6–6	East Yokozuna #1; Sat out due to injury 0–0–15	East Yokozuna #1; 15–0	East Yokozuna #1; 10–5
1973	East Yokozuna #1; 10–5	West Yokozuna #1; 14–1	East Yokozuna #1; 9–6	East Yokozuna #2; 14–1–P	West Yokozuna #1; 8–3–4	East Yokozuna #1; 10–5
1974	East Yokozuna #2; 3–6–6	East Yokozuna #2; Sat out due to injury 0–0–15	East Yokozuna #2; Sat out due to injury 0–0–15	East Yokozuna #2; Retired; 0–3	x	x
Record given as wins–losses–absences Top division champion Top division runner-up Retired Lower divisions Non-participation Sanshō key: F=Fighting spirit; O=Outstanding performance; T=Technique Also shown: ★=Kinboshi; P=Playoff(s); Divisions: Makuuchi — Jūryō — Makushita — Sandanme — Jonidan — Jonokuchi Makuuchi ranks: Yokozuna — Ōzeki — Sekiwake — Komusubi — Maegashira

== See also ==
- Glossary of sumo terms
- Kanreki dohyo-iri
- List of past sumo wrestlers
- List of sumo tournament top division champions
- List of sumo tournament top division runners-up
- List of sumo tournament second division champions
- List of yokozuna

Preceded by Tamanoumi Masahiro	52nd Yokozuna; 1970–1974	Succeeded by Kotozakura Masakatsu I
Yokozuna is not a successive rank, and more than one wrestler can hold the title at once
