= Tsurugamine Akio =

Sumo wrestler

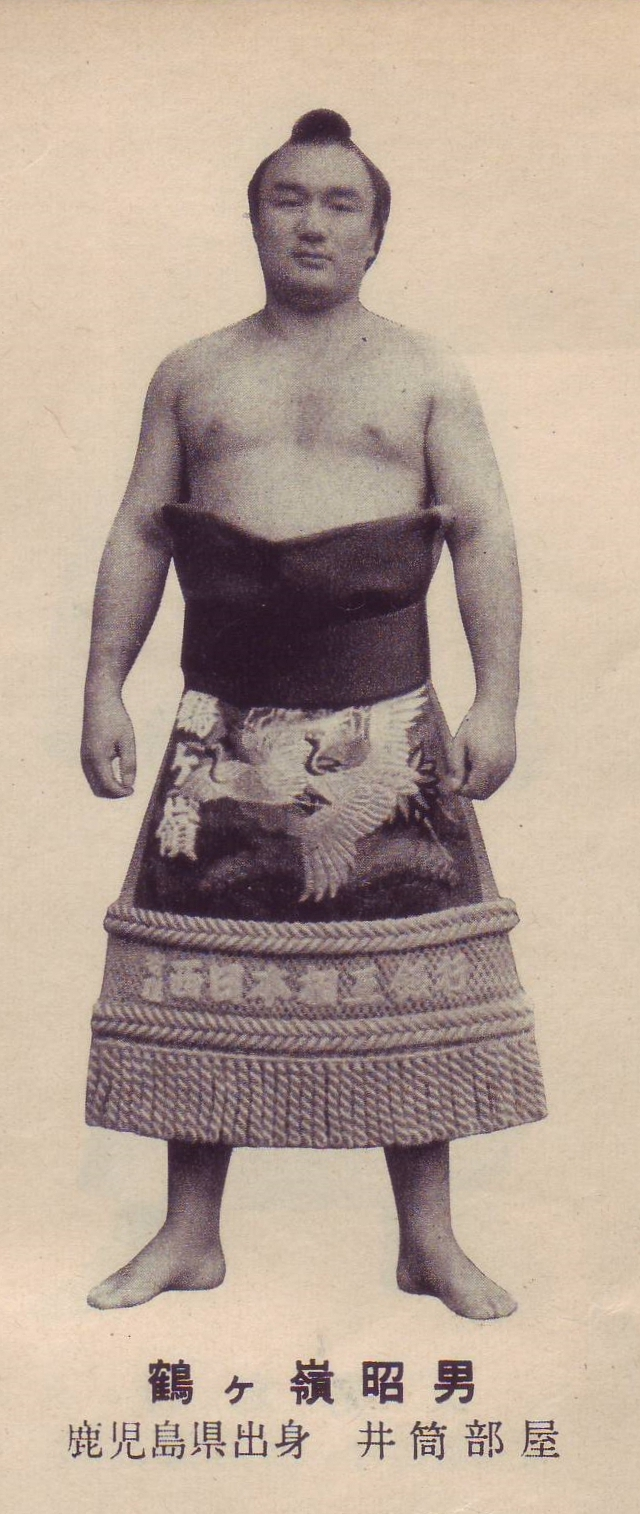

Personal information
- Native name: 鶴ヶ嶺 昭男
- Born: Akio Fukuzono; 26 April 1929 Kagoshima, Japan
- Died: 29 May 2006 (aged 77)
- Height: 1.77 m (5 ft 9 1/2 in)
- Weight: 114 kg (251 lb)

Sport
- Sport: Sumo
- Retired: July, 1967
- Heya: Izutsu
- Record: 682-676-22
- Debut: June, 1947
- Highest rank: Sekiwake (May, 1956)
- Elder name: Izutsu
- Championships: 1 (Jūryō); 1 (Jonokuchi)
- Special Prizes: Outstanding Performance (2); Fighting Spirit (2); Technique (10)
- Gold Stars: 10; Tochinishiki (4); Wakanohana I (3); Asashio III (3)
- Updated on June 2020

Tsurugamine Akio (26 April 1929 – 29 May 2006), real name Akio Fukuzono, was a sumo wrestler from Aira, Kagoshima, Japan. His highest rank was sekiwake. He was twice runner-up in a tournament and won 14 special prizes, including a record ten for Technique, and earned ten gold stars for defeating yokozuna. After his retirement he was the head of Izutsu stable and coached two of his sons, Sakahoko and Terao, to the top division.

== Career ==
Fukuzono was in the navy during World War II, but had an interest in joining sumo. He began his professional career in June 1947, recruited by a fellow Kagoshima Prefecture native, former maegashira Tsurugamine Michiyoshi, who had just retired and become Izutsu Oyakata. He began under his own surname of Fukuzono but in his first official tournament on the banzuke he switched to Kakureizan. He won the jonokuchi yūshō or championship in this tournament. In November 1947 he followed Izutsu Oyakata in leaving Tokitsukaze stable to a newly re-established Izutsu stable. After winning the jūryō championship in September 1952 and following up with a 9–6 record in January 1953, he was promoted to the top makuuchi division. To mark the occasion he adopted his stablemaster's old shikona of Tsurugamine.

He had an exceptionally long top division career, which lasted fourteen years from March 1953 to his retirement in July 1967 at the age of thirty eight. He fought in the top division for 77 tournaments and won 550 bouts there. Both were records at the time, although his makuuchi wins record was surpassed by Taiho (who had fought all of his bouts in the six tournaments per year system) in the following September 1967 tournament and his makuuchi tournaments record was surpassed by Takamiyama in November 1980. His best result was in January 1956 when he lost only one bout and took part in a playoff for the tournament championship with yokozuna Kagamisato. He was also runner-up in the July 1962 tournament. He earned ten kinboshi (gold stars) for defeating yokozuna, four over Tochinishiki, three over Wakanohana and three over Asashio. His highest rank was sekiwake, which he held twice in May 1956 and September 1962.

== Retirement from sumo ==
Following his retirement from active competition Tsurugamine became an elder of the Sumo Association under the toshiyori name of Kimigahama, and set up his own Kimigahama stable. However, he really coveted the stock of his old Izutsu stable, but was unable to come to agreement with the widow of his old boss, who had died in March 1972. In 1977 he was able to purchase the stock from former yokozuna Kitanofuji and became head coach of the renamed Izutsu stable. He was well-known for insisting on intense training or keiko. His wife was the adopted daughter of the adopted daughter of the 25th yokozuna Nishinoumi II, who had founded Izutsu stable in 1909, and all three of his sons joined the stable as new recruits. Two of them, Sakahoko and Terao, emulated their father by having successful top division careers. He also oversaw the promotion of Kirishima to ōzeki in 1990. In 1994 he reached the mandatory retirement age and passed on ownership of the stable to his middle son Sakahoko. Terao founded his own Shikoroyama stable in 2004. His oldest son, who used three different shikona in his career (Fukuzono, Kakureizan and Tsurunofuji) never got beyond the juryo division and did not qualify to become an elder. Instead he ran a chankonabe restaurant after his retirement in 1990.

== Death ==
Tsurugamine died of sepsis in May 2006 at the age of seventy seven.

== Fighting style ==
Tsurugamine was a light but extremely skilful wrestler. His ten sanshō (special prizes) for Technique remain a record to this day. He specialized in morozashi, or getting a mawashi grip with both hands inside his opponent's. (This technique was also a favourite of his son Sakahoko.) His most common winning kimarite were yori-kiri (force out), yori-taoshi (force out and down) and soto-gake (outer leg trip).

== Career record ==
The New Year tournament began and the Spring tournament returned to Osaka in 1953.

Tsurugamine Akio
-	Spring Haru basho, Tokyo	Summer Natsu basho, Tokyo	Autumn Aki basho, Tokyo
1947	x	Shinjo; 3–2	West Jonokuchi #5; 5–1; Champion
1948	Not held	East Jonidan #6; 4–2	West Sandanme #18; 4–2
1949	West Sandanme #5; 7–5	West Makushita #19; 9–6	West Makushita #9; 7–8
1950	East Makushita #11; 7–8	West Makushita #11; 7–8	East Makushita #15; 7–8
1951	West Makushita #16; 6–9	West Makushita #19; 11–4	West Makushita #5; 9–6
1952	East Makushita #1; 11–4	East Jūryō #11; 8–7	East Jūryō #10; 11–4; Champion
Record given as wins–losses–absences Top division champion Top division runner-up Retired Lower divisions Non-participation Sanshō key: F=Fighting spirit; O=Outstanding performance; T=Technique Also shown: ★=Kinboshi; P=Playoff(s); Divisions: Makuuchi — Jūryō — Makushita — Sandanme — Jonidan — Jonokuchi Makuuchi ranks: Yokozuna — Ōzeki — Sekiwake — Komusubi — Maegashira

-	New Year Hatsu basho, Tokyo	Spring Haru basho, Osaka	Summer Natsu basho, Tokyo	Autumn Aki basho, Tokyo
1953	West Jūryō #1; 9–6	East Maegashira #17; 8–7	East Maegashira #16; 3–12	West Jūryō #1; 10–5
1954	East Maegashira #17; 7–8	East Maegashira #19; 8–7	East Maegashira #18; 8–7	East Maegashira #13; 8–7
1955	West Maegashira #12; 9–6	East Maegashira #7; 10–5	East Maegashira #2; 6–9	East Maegashira #5; 5–10 ★
1956	East Maegashira #10; 14–1–P; T	East Komusubi; 9–6; T	West Sekiwake; 7–8	West Komusubi; 7–8
Record given as wins–losses–absences Top division champion Top division runner-up Retired Lower divisions Non-participation Sanshō key: F=Fighting spirit; O=Outstanding performance; T=Technique Also shown: ★=Kinboshi; P=Playoff(s); Divisions: Makuuchi — Jūryō — Makushita — Sandanme — Jonidan — Jonokuchi Makuuchi ranks: Yokozuna — Ōzeki — Sekiwake — Komusubi — Maegashira

== Modern top division record ==
- Since the addition of the Kyushu tournament in 1957 and the Nagoya tournament in 1958, the yearly schedule has remained unchanged.

Year	January Hatsu basho, Tokyo	March Haru basho, Osaka	May Natsu basho, Tokyo	July Nagoya basho, Nagoya	September Aki basho, Tokyo	November Kyūshū basho, Fukuoka
1957	East Komusubi; 5–10	West Maegashira #3; 9–6 ★	East Komusubi; 5–10	Not held	East Maegashira #4; 6–9	East Maegashira #6; 9–6
1958	East Maegashira #2; 3–12	East Maegashira #10; 9–6	West Maegashira #5; 9–6; O★★	West Maegashira #1; 1–6–8	West Maegashira #12; 11–4	East Maegashira #3; 5–10
1959	West Maegashira #8; 10–5	East Maegashira #4; 8–7	West Maegashira #2; 7–8	West Maegashira #3; 9–6; T	East Maegashira #1; 9–6; O★	East Komusubi; 2–13
1960	West Maegashira #5; 10–5 ★	East Maegashira #2; 8–7 ★	East Maegashira #2; 7–8	East Maegashira #3; 6–9	West Maegashira #3; 6–9	East Maegashira #7; 10–5
1961	East Maegashira #3; 10–5; T★	East Komusubi; 4–11	East Maegashira #3; 7–8 ★	West Maegashira #3; 8–7 ★	East Maegashira #1; 7–8	West Maegashira #2; 5–10
1962	West Maegashira #8; 11–4	West Maegashira #3; 1–5–9	West Maegashira #12; 10–5	West Maegashira #7; 11–4; T	West Sekiwake; 7–8	West Komusubi; 4–11
1963	West Maegashira #3; 5–10	West Maegashira #6; 10–5; T	West Maegashira #1; 9–6; T	East Komusubi; 8–7	East Komusubi; 4–11	West Maegashira #4; 5–10
1964	West Maegashira #8; 7–8	West Maegashira #9; 11–4; T	East Maegashira #3; 6–9	West Maegashira #4; 3–12	East Maegashira #10; 11–4	West Maegashira #2; 3–12
1965	West Maegashira #9; 9–6	East Maegashira #4; 3–12	West Maegashira #8; 9–6	East Maegashira #6; 7–8	East Maegashira #7; 7–8	West Maegashira #7; 11–4; T
1966	West Maegashira #2; 5–10	West Maegashira #6; 5–10	East Maegashira #13; 8–7	East Maegashira #11; 11–4; TF	East Maegashira #3; 2–8–5	West Maegashira #10; 11–4; F
1967	East Maegashira #2; 5–10	West Maegashira #6; 6–9	East Maegashira #12; 8–7	East Maegashira #8; Retired; 2–13	x	x
Record given as wins–losses–absences Top division champion Top division runner-up Retired Lower divisions Non-participation Sanshō key: F=Fighting spirit; O=Outstanding performance; T=Technique Also shown: ★=Kinboshi; P=Playoff(s); Divisions: Makuuchi — Jūryō — Makushita — Sandanme — Jonidan — Jonokuchi Makuuchi ranks: Yokozuna — Ōzeki — Sekiwake — Komusubi — Maegashira

== See also ==
- List of sumo record holders
- List of sumo tournament top division runners-up
- List of sumo tournament second division champions
- Glossary of sumo terms
- List of past sumo wrestlers
- List of sekiwake
