= Izutsu stable =

Defunct sumo stable

Coordinates: 35.6925°N 139.7920°E

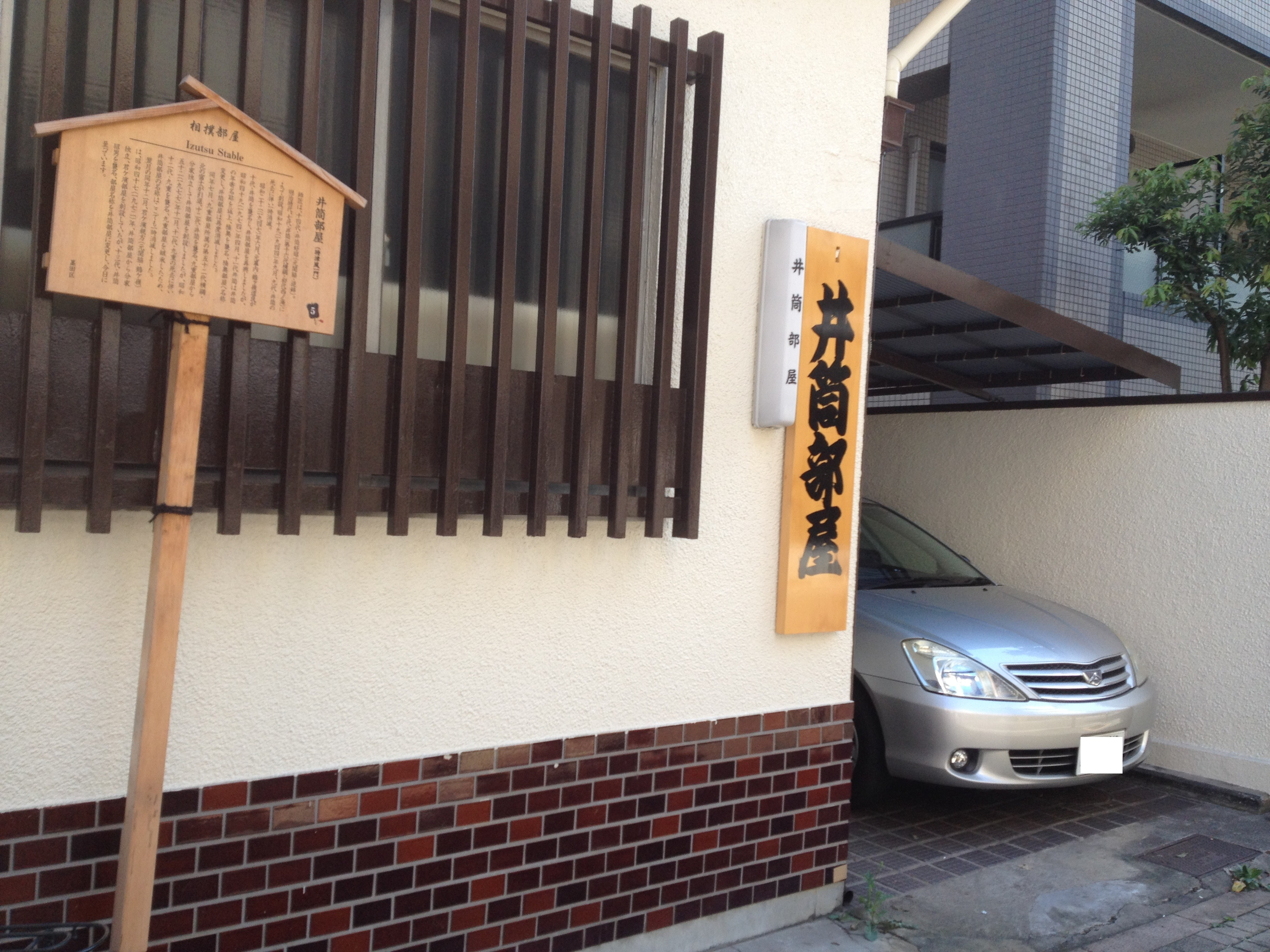
Front of Izutsu stable (2014)

Izutsu stable (Japanese: 井筒部屋, Hepburn: Izutsu beya) (1909–2019) was a sumo stable of the Tokitsukaze group.

Its last incarnation was in existence from 1972 until 2019.

The stable was established in the Meiji era by former yokozuna Nishinoumi Kajirō I, the 16th yokozuna, who became the 7th Izutsu-oyakata. He was succeeded by Nishinoumi Kajirō II, the 25th yokozuna who ran the stable from 1909 until his death in 1931. The latest incarnation of Izutsu stable was in the hands of the same family, having been founded as Kimigahama stable by his grandson-in-law Tsurugamine Akio in 1972 and subsequently renamed Izutsu stable in 1977, after Tsurugamine obtained the stock from former yokozuna Kitanofuji (who would become the head of Kokonoe stable). Tsurugamine Akio had previously attempted to obtain the Izutsu stock from the widow of his old stablemaster, the former maegashira Tsurugamine Michiyoshi, who had run a different version of the stable from 1947 until his death in March 1972, but had been unable to come to an agreement with her. All three of Tsurugamine's sons, Kakureizan, Sakahoko and Terao, were members of the stable, with Sakahoko and Terao emulating their father by reaching the sekiwake rank. Sakahoko took over the stable from his father in 1994. Sakahoko's nephew, Fukuzono Yoichiro, was a wrestler at the stable from 1988 until 2007, reaching a highest rank of jūryō 9. The stable declined from around 20 wrestlers when Sakahoko inherited it to just three as of 2019, of whom the sole sekitori was Kakuryū, who reached the yokozuna rank in March 2014. Sakahoko commented in 2008 that it was difficult to attract new recruits as "there are many heyas nowadays" but that as he was the only coach in the stable, a relatively small number meant he could give each wrestler close attention.

Sakahoko died at the age of 58 in September 2019. The stable's wrestlers and tokoyama were temporarily under the care of Kagamiyama, a director of the Japan Sumo Association and fellow member of the Tokitsukaze group, but moved to Michinoku stable, which is run by the former stablemate of Sakahoko, ōzeki Kirishima, and originally branched off from Izutsu in 1974. Demolition of the building that housed Izutsu stable began on 4 November 2020. The Izutsu elder name was used from 2020 to 2023 by the former Toyonoshima of the affiliated Tokitsukaze stable.

== Ring name conventions ==
Most wrestlers at this stable took ring names or shikona that begin with the character 鶴 (read: tsuru or kaku), meaning crane, in deference to the former owner, who was active as Tsurugamine.

== Owners ==
- 1994–2019: 14th Izutsu (fuku-riji, sekiwake Sakahoko)
- 1977–1994: 13th Izutsu (sekiwake Tsurugamine Akio)
- 1974–1977: 12th Izutsu (yokozuna Kitanofuji)
- 1972–1974: 11th Izutsu (maegashira Hoshikabuto Yoshio)
- 1947–1972: 10th Izutsu (maegashira Tsurugamine Michiyoshi)
- 1931–1944: 9th Izutsu (maegashira Hoshikabuto Saneyoshi)
- 1909–1931: 8th Izutsu (yokozuna Nishinoumi Kajirō II)

== Notable former members ==
- Nishinoumi Kajirō II (25th yokozuna)
- Nishinoumi Kajirō III (30th yokozuna)
- Kakuryū Rikisaburō (71st yokozuna)
- Toyokuni Fukuma (ōzeki)
- Kirishima Kazuhiro (ōzeki)
- Komagatake Kuniriki (ōzeki)
- Terao Tsunefumi (sekiwake)
- 36th Kimura Shōnosuke (given name Toshihiro Yamazaki - chief referee)

== Hairdresser ==
- Tokotsuru (first class tokoyama)

== Location and access ==
Tokyo, Sumida Ward, Ryōgoku 2-2-7
8 minute walk from west exit of Ryōgoku Station on the Sōbu Line

== See also ==
- List of sumo stables
- List of sumo elders
- List of active sumo wrestlers
- List of past sumo wrestlers
- List of years in sumo
- Glossary of sumo terms
