= Nishinoumi Kajirō II =

Japanese sumo wrestler

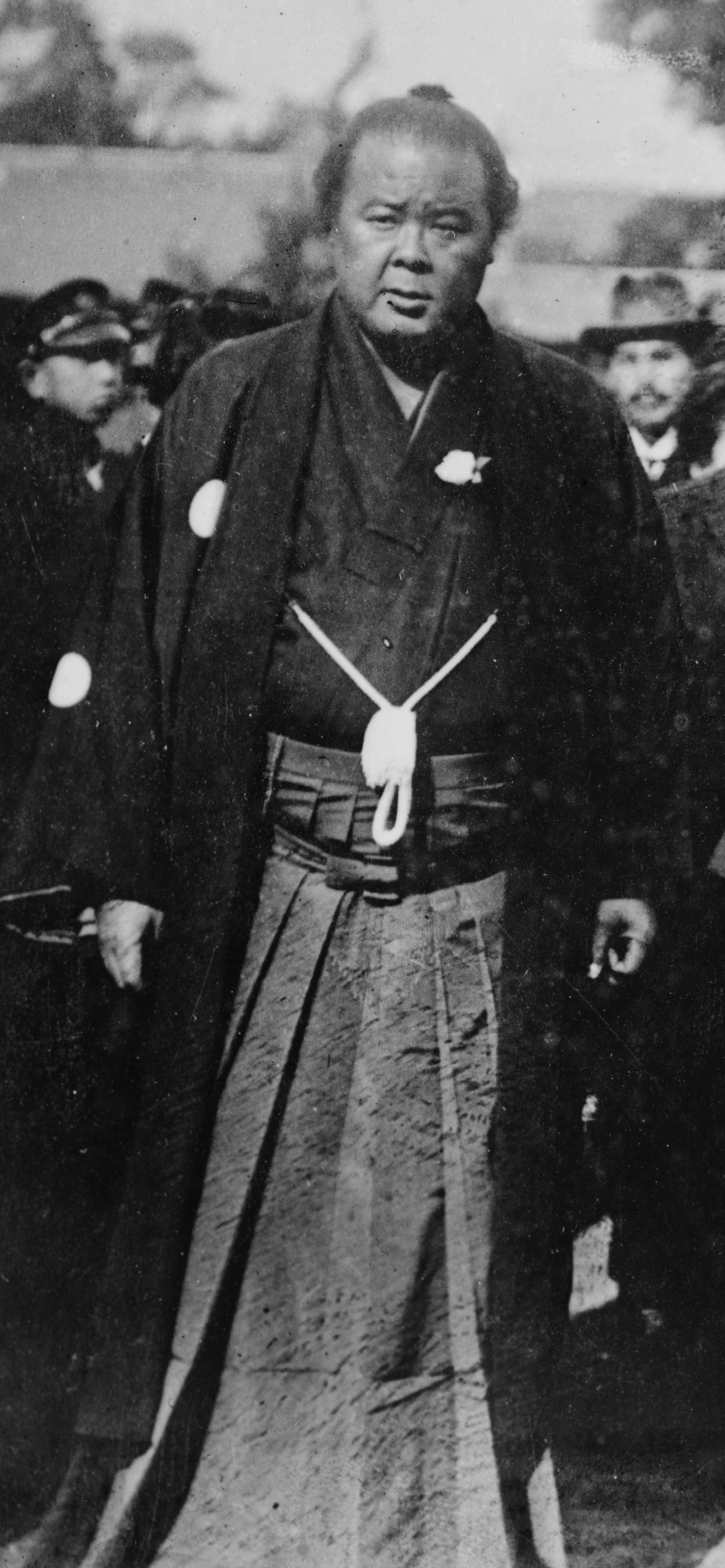
- Nishinoumi Kajirō II, ca. 1916

Personal information
- Native name: 西ノ海 嘉治郎
- Born: Makise Kyūhachi; February 6, 1880 Kagoshima, Japan
- Died: January 27, 1931 (aged 50)
- Height: 1.85 m (6 ft 1 in)
- Weight: 139 kg (306 lb)

Sport
- Sport: Sumo
- Retired: May, 1918
- Heya: Izutsu
- Record: 106-38-70-27draws-9holds (Makuuchi)
- Debut: January, 1900
- Highest rank: Yokozuna (February, 1916)
- Elder name: Izutsu
- Championships: 1 (Makuuchi)
- Updated on June 2020

Nishinoumi Kajirō II (Japanese: 西ノ海 嘉治郎; February 6, 1880 – January 27, 1931) was a Japanese professional sumo wrestler. He was the sport's 25th yokozuna.

== Career ==
His real name was Makise Kyūhachi (牧瀬 休八), but he later changed his surname to Kondō (近藤). He entered sumo in January 1900, using the shikona name Tanegashima (種子ヶ島). He changed it to Nishikinada Yosaburō (錦洋 与三郎) in May 1905, and was promoted to the top makuuchi division in May 1906. A month later he changed his ring name again, this time to Nishinoumi Nadaemon (西ノ海 灘右エ門). He changed his shikona for the last time in January 1914, when he took the given name Kajirō.

Nishinoumi was awarded a yokozuna licence by the house of Yoshida Tsukasa in February 1916 after winning a championship at the January 1916 tournament. He was 36 years old at the time of his promotion, making him the oldest wrestler to be promoted to yokozuna in the 20th century. In the top makuuchi division, he won 106 bouts and lost 38 bouts, recording a winning percentage of 73.6. He was the only wrestler to defeat Tachiyama between 1909 and 1916, his victory in January 1912 preventing Tachiyama from recording 100 straight wins (he had a winning streak of 43 before, and 56 after their bout). Tachiyama claimed many years later that Nishinoumi's win over him had been yaocho (fixed), but there is little evidence for this.

He favoured the yokozuna dohyō-iri (yokozuna ring-entering ceremony) style that has come to be known as Unryū .

After his retirement, he was an elder known as Izutsu and produced many top division wrestlers, such as yokozuna Nishinoumi Kajirō III. During his tenure Izutsu's influence in the Japan Sumo Association increased, but he was accused of using his position unfairly by his opponents after he added a director to the Sumo Association's board from his own ichimon or stable group. He eventually committed suicide by hanging on January 27, 1931.

His adopted daughter's grandsons are Sakahoko Akihiro and Terao Tsunefumi.

== Top division record ==
Nishinoumi
-	Spring	Summer
1906	x	West Maegashira #10; 3–4–1; 1d 1h
1907	West Maegashira #7; 3–1–6	West Maegashira #8; 6–1–1; 2d
1908	West Sekiwake; 4–2–1; 3d	West Sekiwake; 7–1–1; 1d
1909	East Sekiwake; 3–0–7	East Sekiwake; 5–2–1; 2d
1910	East Ōzeki; 2–1–2; 3d 2h	East Ōzeki; 1–1–7; 1h
1911	East Ōzeki; 6–1; 2d 1h	East Ōzeki; 1–2–5; 1d 1h
1912	West Ōzeki; 7–1; 2d	East Ōzeki; 7–2; 1d
1913	East Ōzeki; 4–3; 2d 1h	West Ōzeki; 5–3; 2d
1914	West Ōzeki; 6–2; 1d 1h	East Ōzeki; 6–3; 1d
1915	East Ōzeki; 4–1–3; 1d 1h	East Ōzeki; 6–2–1; 1d
1916	East Ōzeki; 8–0–1; 1d	East Yokozuna; 8–2
1917	West Yokozuna; 2–2–6	West Yokozuna; 2–1–7
1918	Sat out	East Yokozuna; Retired; 0–0–10
Record given as win-loss-absent Top Division Champion Top Division Runner-up Retired Lower Divisions Key:d=Draw(s) (引分); h=Hold(s) (預り); Divisions: Makuuchi — Jūryō — Makushita — Sandanme — Jonidan — Jonokuchi Makuuchi ranks: Yokozuna — Ōzeki — Sekiwake — Komusubi — Maegashira

== See also ==
- Glossary of sumo terms
- List of past sumo wrestlers
- List of sumo tournament top division champions
- List of yokozuna

Preceded by Ōtori Tanigorō	25th Yokozuna; 1916–1918	Succeeded by Ōnishiki Uichirō
Yokozuna is not a successive rank, and more than one wrestler can hold the title at once
