= Nishinoumi Kajirō III =

Japanese sumo wrestler

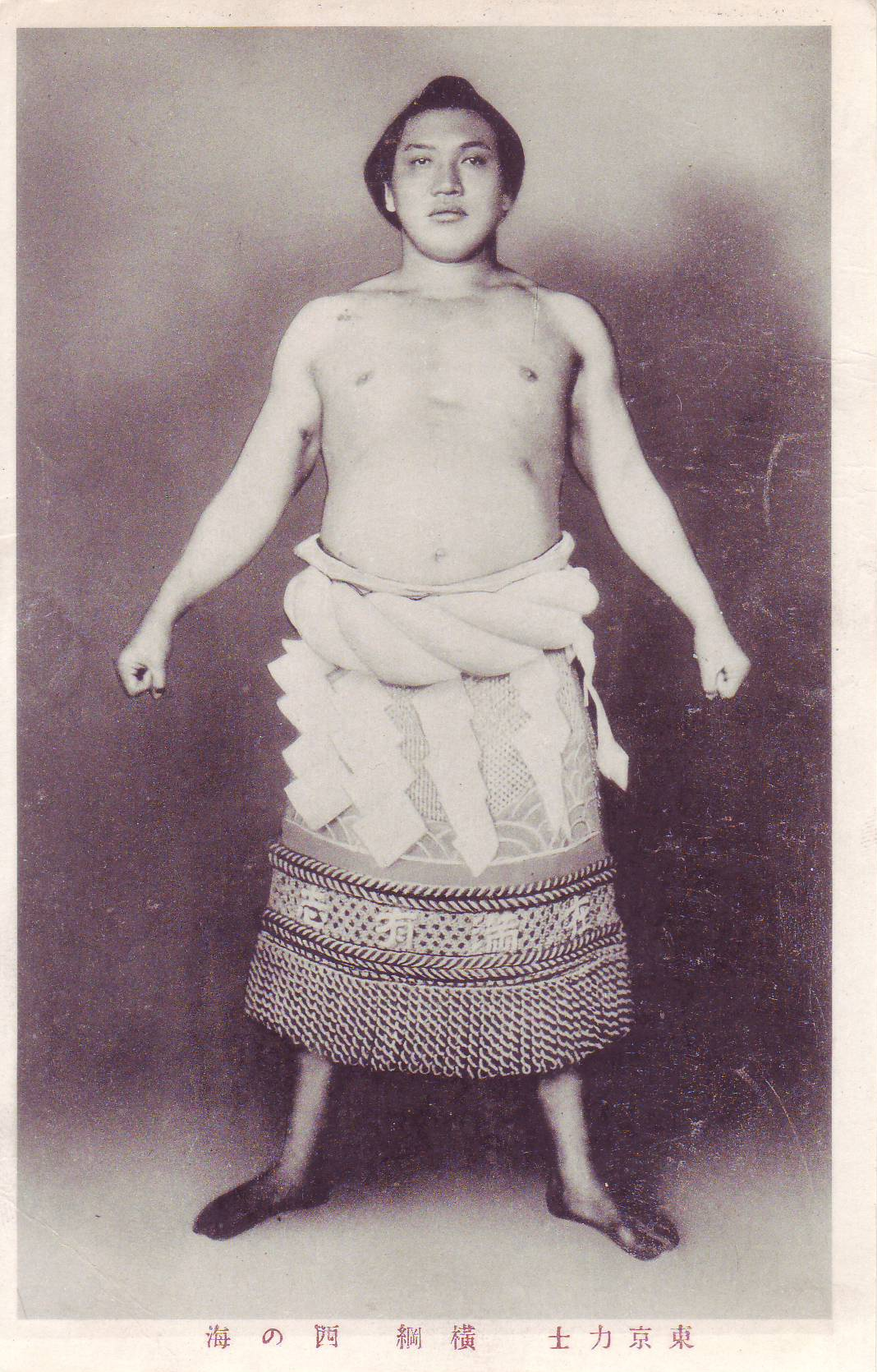

Personal information
- Native name: 西ノ海 嘉治郎
- Born: Matsuyama Isesuke; November 2, 1890 Kagoshima, Japan
- Died: July 28, 1933 (aged 42)
- Height: 1.83 m (6 ft 0 in)
- Weight: 116 kg (256 lb)

Sport
- Sport: Sumo
- Retired: October, 1928
- Heya: Izutsu
- Record: 176-69-121-4draws-2holds (Total); 134-60-116-2draws-2holds (Makuuchi)
- Debut: January 1910
- Highest rank: Yokozuna (April 1923)
- Elder name: Asakayama
- Championships: 1 (Makuuchi); 1 (Jūryō); 1 (Makushita); 1 (Jonidan)
- Updated on June 2020

Nishinoumi Kajirō III (Japanese: 西ノ海 嘉治郎; November 2, 1890 – July 28, 1933) was a Japanese professional sumo wrestler. He was the sport's 30th yokozuna.

== Career ==
He was born Matsuyama Isesuke (松山 伊勢助). He joined Izutsu stable and made a debut in January 1910. His first shikona or ring name was Genjiyama Isesuke (源氏山 伊セ介). In January 1914, he changed its given name to Daigorō (大五郎). He was promoted to the top makuuchi division in January 1916. He was promoted to ōzeki in January 1922.

After Ōnishiki Uichirō left the sumo world, there remained only one yokozuna, Tochigiyama, in Tokyo sumo at that time. The Tokyo Sumo Association wanted to promote one more yokozuna. Although he didn't record significantly superior results, he was awarded a yokozuna licence in April 1923. He was promoted to that rank without winning any championships in the top makuuchi division. Therefore, his promotion was controversial, although championships (yūshō) before January 1926 were officially awarded not by the Sumo Association but by a newspaper, the Osaka Mainichi Shimbun. To mark his promotion he changed his shikona to Nishinoumi Kajirō in January 1924, in honour of his stablemaster who was the 25th yokozuna Nishinoumi Kajirō II.

He won his only championship in May 1925. He was stricken by heart disease in November 1925 and was absent from the next tournament. His strength continued to decline and he retired in October 1928. In the top makuuchi division, he won 134 bouts and lost 60 bouts, recording a winning percentage of 69.1.

Upon his retirement he became an elder of the Japan Sumo Association under the name Asakayama, and in 1929 opened up his own Asakayama stable (unconnected to the stable of the same name established in 2014) which he ran until his death in 1933.

== Top division record ==
- In 1927 Tokyo and Osaka sumo merged and four tournaments a year in Tokyo and other locations began to be held.

Nishinoumi
-	Spring	Summer
1916	East Maegashira #13; 9–1	East Maegashira #3; 2–3–5
1917	West Maegashira #5; 4–5–1	West Maegashira #6; 5–4; 1d
1918	East Maegashira #3; 7–2–1	East Sekiwake; 2–8
1919	East Maegashira #3; 5–4–1	East Maegashira #6; 9–1
1920	East Komusubi; 7–3	West Komusubi; 5–2–3
1921	West Sekiwake; 7–2; 1h	East Sekiwake; 8–2
1922	West Ōzeki; 7–3	Sat out
1923	West Ōzeki; 8–1; 1d	East Yokozuna; 5–2–4
1924	Sat out	West Yokozuna; 5–2–3; 1h
1925	West Yokozuna; 9–2	East Yokozuna; 9–2
1926	Sat out	West Yokozuna; 9–2
Record given as wins–losses–absences Top division champion Top division runner-up Retired Lower divisions Non-participation Sanshō key: F=Fighting spirit; O=Outstanding performance; T=Technique Also shown: ★=Kinboshi; P=Playoff(s); Divisions: Makuuchi — Jūryō — Makushita — Sandanme — Jonidan — Jonokuchi Makuuchi ranks: Yokozuna — Ōzeki — Sekiwake — Komusubi — Maegashira

-	Spring Haru basho, Tokyo	March Sangatsu basho, varied	Summer Natsu basho, Tokyo	October Jūgatsu basho, varied
1927	East Yokozuna; 3–2–6	Sat out	East Yokozuna; 1–2–8	West Yokozuna; 1–2–8
1928	West Yokozuna; 7–3–1	Sat out	Sat out	East Yokozuna; Retired; 0–0
Record given as win-loss-absent Top Division Champion Top Division Runner-up Retired Lower Divisions Key:d=Draw(s) (引分); h=Hold(s) (預り); Divisions: Makuuchi — Jūryō — Makushita — Sandanme — Jonidan — Jonokuchi Makuuchi ranks: Yokozuna — Ōzeki — Sekiwake — Komusubi — Maegashira

== See also ==
- Glossary of sumo terms
- List of past sumo wrestlers
- List of sumo tournament top division champions
- List of sumo tournament second division champions
- List of yokozuna

Preceded by Miyagiyama Fukumatsu	30th Yokozuna; 1923–1928	Succeeded by Tsunenohana Kan'ichi
Yokozuna is not a successive rank, and more than one wrestler can hold the title at once
