= Terao Tsunefumi =

Japanese sumo wrestler (1963–2023)

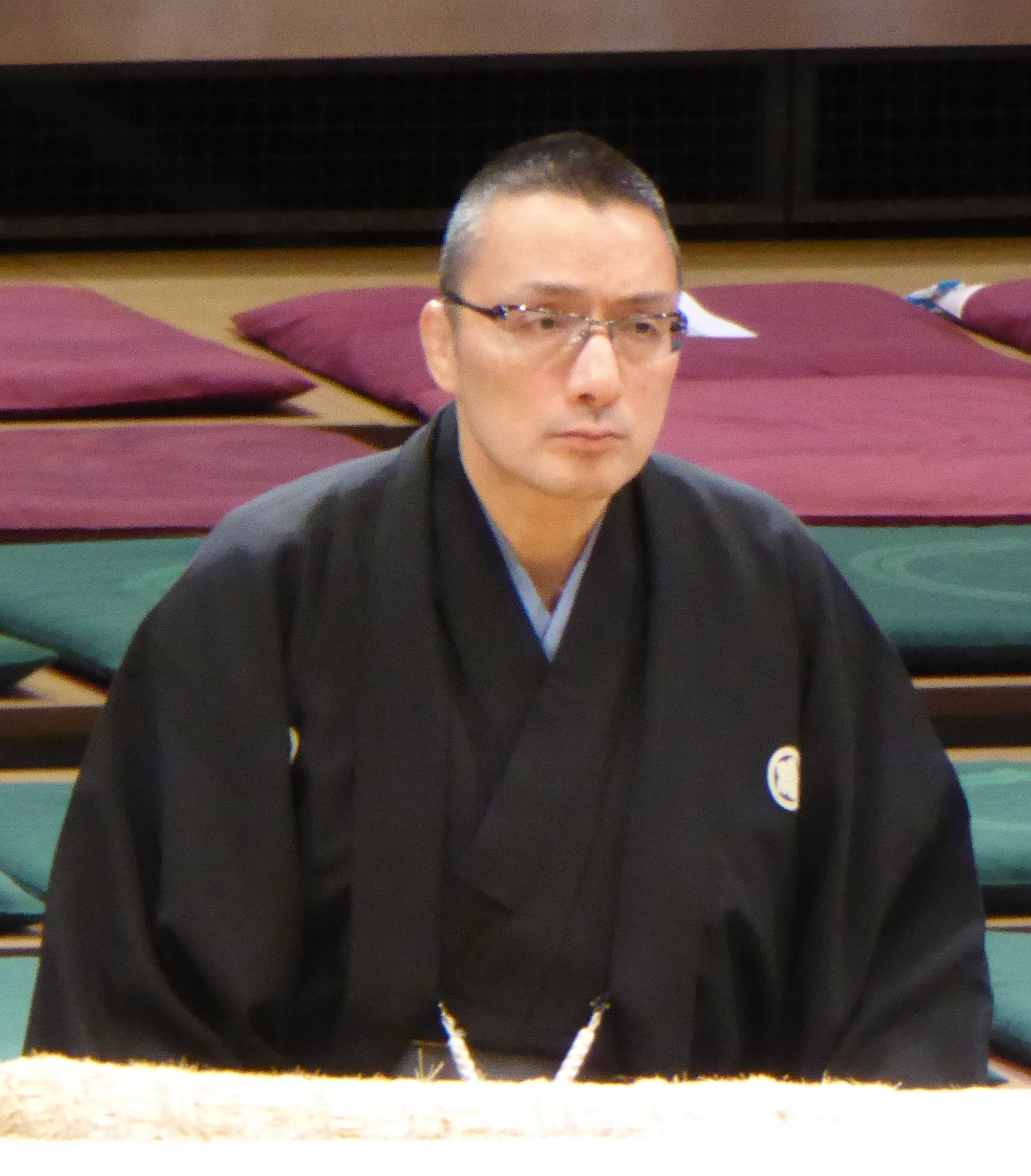
- Tsunefumi in 2016

Personal information
- Native name: 寺尾 常史
- Born: Yoshifumi Fukuzono; 2 February 1963 Tokyo, Japan
- Died: 17 December 2023 (aged 60) Tokyo, Japan
- Height: 1.86 m (6 ft 1 in)
- Weight: 117 kg (258 lb)

Sport
- Sport: Sumo
- Retired: September 2002
- Heya: Izutsu
- Record: 860-938-58
- Debut: July 1979
- Highest rank: Sekiwake (March 1989)
- Elder name: Shikoroyama
- Championships: 2 (Jūryō)
- Special Prizes: Outstanding Performance (3); Fighting Spirit (3); Technique (1)
- Gold Stars: 7 Ōnokuni (3); Chiyonofuji; Hokutoumi; Takanohana II; Musashimaru
- Updated on August 2007

Terao Tsunefumi (寺尾 常史; born as Yoshifumi Fukuzono 福薗 好文; 2 February 1963 – 17 December 2023) was a Japanese sumo wrestler. He was born in Tokyo, but brought up in Kajiki, Aira District, Kagoshima, Japan. He fought out of Izutsu stable. The highest rank he reached was sekiwake. Despite his relatively light weight he had an extremely long career, spanning 23 years from 1979 until 2002, and was known as the "iron man" of sumo. After retiring, he was the owner of the Shikoroyama stable until his death in 2023.

== Sumo family ==
Terao had a long sumo pedigree. He was the third son of former sekiwake Tsurugamine, and younger brother of Kakureizan (former jūryō) and Sakahoko (former sekiwake). His paternal grandfather was a cousin of Satsumanishiki (former makushita). His father married the adopted daughter of former makushita Kaganishiki, who was adopted by Nishinoumi, the 25th yokozuna. His cousin is Tsurunofuji (former jūryō). Terao and his brothers Kakureizan and Sakahoko together hold various sumo records: they are the first three brothers ever to reach sekitori status; in September 1986 Terao and Sakahoko were the first brothers to win prizes together; and in March 1989 they were the first brothers to hold sekiwake rank simultaneously. In November 1990 they appeared together in Chiyonofuji's ring-entering ceremony as sword-bearer and dew-sweeper.

== Career ==
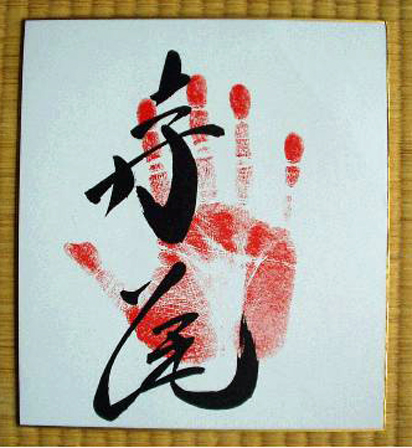
Terao's tegata

Terao took up sumo shortly after his mother died of cancer. He joined Izutsu stable, which was run by his father, alongside his two brothers. He started competing under the name Terao Setsuo (寺尾 節男) after his mother's maiden name Setsuko Terao (寺尾 節子, Terao Setsuko).

Terao first entered the second jūryō division in July 1984. To mark this promotion he changed his name to Genjiyama Rikisaburō, but reverted to Terao Setsuo after a single tournament. After winning the jūryō championship in January 1985 he entered the top makuuchi division, but won only 6 bouts out of 15 and so returned to jūryō. He won the jūryō division the next tournament and so reentered makuuchi in July 1985. In September 1986 he earned nine wins and his first special prize, for Fighting Spirit. This advanced him to his then highest rank, maegashira 1. He changed his name to Terao Tsunefumi in November 1987, on the advice of a fortune-teller. In the following tournament in January 1988, he defeated yokozuna Onokuni to earn his first kinboshi. He defeated Chiyonofuji in the January 1989 tournament and won the Outstanding Performance Award. In the next basho in March 1989, he finally made his breakthrough into the titled san'yaku ranks at sekiwake after four years in the top division, joining his brother at sumo's third highest rank.

Although Terao fought several tournaments at sekiwake he never came close to ōzeki, his best performance as sekiwake being 9–6. His last appearance in san'yaku was at komusubi rank in July 1994. In March 1995 he upset Takanohana for the only time as a yokozuna, earning his last special prize. In November 1999, at the age of 35, he defeated Musashimaru for his final kinboshi. He remained in makuuchi until May 2000 when he was finally demoted at age 37 after 90 consecutive top division tournaments. However, he managed to return to makuuchi for two tournaments in March and May 2001, becoming at 38 years and 24 days the oldest man post World War II to earn promotion to the top division. His last tournament was in September 2002, where he scored only five wins at the rank of jūryō 11 and faced certain demotion to the makushita division.

== Records ==
Despite suffering from a heart condition, Terao enjoyed an exceptionally long and relatively injury-free career from his debut in 1979 aged 16 to his retirement in 2002 aged 39. He was referred to as the Tetsujin, or Iron Man, of sumo. Among his other nicknames were "The Eternal Typhoon," because of both his longevity and his tsuppari fighting style. After being defeated by the 18-year-old Takahanada in March 1991, which he regarded as the most disappointing loss of his career, he was determined to keep fighting for as long as possible.

His total number of bouts is 1795, the fourth highest ever, his total number of makuuchi bouts (1378) is the fifth highest ever. His 860 wins are the tenth highest ever; his 938 losses were the most ever recorded until Kyokutenhō finished his career with 944 losses in 2015. When he had to sit out 1 day of the March 1997 tournament and the whole May 1997 tournament after breaking his big toe in a bout against Kyokushūzan it ended a run of 1359 bouts without absence, the seventh highest ever. 1063 of these were in makuuchi, the fourth highest ever. His 110 tournaments ranked as a sekitori (in the top two divisions) was an all-time record until it was broken by Kaiō in 2010.

== Fighting style ==
Terao was an oshi-sumo specialist, relying on pushing and thrusting techniques, keeping his opponent away from his mawashi. Throughout his career he consistently weighed around 115 kg (254 lb), a considerable disadvantage in an era when most of his opponents were over 150 kg (330 lb). He compensated by relying on his speed and agility, and was often able to use his quick reactions to outwit his heavier opponents. He was well known for his rapid series of thrusts to the chest (tsuppari), enabling him to win many of his matches by hataki-komi (the slap down), oshi-dashi (the push out) and tsuki-dashi (the thrust out). Due to his light weight he was vulnerable to defeat by yori-kiri (force out) if his opponents managed to contain him.

== After retirement ==
Terao was a toshiyori (a sumo elder) known as Shikoroyama Oyakata. In February 2004 he established Shikoroyama stable. He decided not to take any wrestlers from Izutsu stable with him, recruiting all the new stable's wrestlers himself. In January 2006 Hōmashō became his first wrestler to reach sekitori status. Hōmashō retired in January 2015, but later in that same year Seirō became the second wrestler coached by Shikoroyama to reach the top division. Shikoroyama has also produced the sekiwake Abi.

== Personal life ==
While active Terao was friendly with fellow top division wrestlers Masurao and Kotogaume. He was a fan of J-pop. His eldest (adopted) son is actor Yūki Terao.

Sakahoko died in September 2019, and Kakureizan in March 2020, leaving Terao as the only surviving Fukuzono brother. His own health declined in 2022, and he was unable to see his top wrestler Abi win the championship in Kyushu in November as he was hospitalized with arrhythmia.

Terao was admitted to the hospital again in September 2023 with heart issues. His health had been improving, but on 16 December 2023 his condition took a sudden turn for the worse. He died the next evening, on 17 December, at the age of 60.

== Career record ==
Terao Tsunefumi
Year	January Hatsu basho, Tokyo	March Haru basho, Osaka	May Natsu basho, Tokyo	July Nagoya basho, Nagoya	September Aki basho, Tokyo	November Kyūshū basho, Fukuoka
1979	x	x	x	(Maezumo)	East Jonokuchi #34; 6–1	West Jonidan #80; 6–1
1980	East Jonidan #19; 2–5	West Jonidan #42; 6–1	East Sandanme #77; 2–5	West Jonidan #7; 3–4	East Jonidan #21; 5–2	East Sandanme #68; 3–4
1981	West Sandanme #79; 4–3	West Sandanme #58; 3–4	West Sandanme #69; 6–1	East Sandanme #20; 4–3	East Sandanme #8; 4–3	West Makushita #55; 2–5
1982	West Sandanme #14; 6–1	West Makushita #37; 5–2	West Makushita #19; 4–3	West Makushita #16; 4–3	East Makushita #12; 3–4	West Makushita #18; 4–3
1983	East Makushita #11; 3–4	East Makushita #20; 3–4	West Makushita #34; 4–3	East Makushita #23; 3–4	East Makushita #31; 4–3	West Makushita #22; 5–2
1984	West Makushita #10; 5–2	West Makushita #4; 5–2	East Makushita #1; 5–2	East Jūryō #10; 7–8	West Jūryō #11; 8–7	West Jūryō #8; 8–7
1985	West Jūryō #7; 12–3; Champion	West Maegashira #14; 6–9	East Jūryō #3; 12–3; Champion	West Maegashira #12; 10–5	West Maegashira #2; 6–9	West Maegashira #5; 7–8
1986	East Maegashira #7; 7–8	West Maegashira #9; 8–7	West Maegashira #4; 4–11	East Maegashira #12; 8–7	East Maegashira #8; 9–6; F	East Maegashira #1; 6–9
1987	West Maegashira #4; 6–9	East Maegashira #7; 8–7	East Maegashira #2; 5–10	East Maegashira #5; 7–8	East Maegashira #6; 6–9	West Maegashira #9; 8–7
1988	East Maegashira #3; 7–8 ★	West Maegashira #3; 6–9	West Maegashira #6; 8–7	West Maegashira #1; 6–9	West Maegashira #4; 7–8	East Maegashira #6; 8–7
1989	West Maegashira #1; 8–7; O★	West Sekiwake #1; 5–10	East Maegashira #3; 7–8	West Maegashira #3; 10–5; T★	West Sekiwake #1; 8–7; F	West Sekiwake #1; 8–7
1990	East Sekiwake #2; 7–8	West Komusubi #1; 8–7	East Sekiwake #1; 7–8	West Komusubi #1; 8–7	West Sekiwake #1; 9–6	East Sekiwake #1; 5–10
1991	East Maegashira #2; 8–7 ★	West Komusubi #1; 8–7	East Komusubi #1; 5–10	West Maegashira #3; 6–9	East Maegashira #7; 8–7	East Maegashira #4; 6–9 ★
1992	East Maegashira #8; 8–7	West Maegashira #4; 8–7	East Maegashira #2; 2–13	East Maegashira #13; 9–6	East Maegashira #8; 9–6	East Maegashira #2; 7–8
1993	East Maegashira #5; 6–9	West Maegashira #9; 8–7	East Maegashira #5; 5–10	East Maegashira #11; 8–7	West Maegashira #4; 6–9	West Maegashira #6; 7–8
1994	East Maegashira #8; 8–7	West Maegashira #2; 9–6; F	West Komusubi #1; 8–7; O	West Komusubi #1; 4–11	East Maegashira #3; 4–11	West Maegashira #9; 9–6
1995	West Maegashira #2; 5–10	West Maegashira #6; 8–7; O★	East Maegashira #1; 5–10	West Maegashira #5; 5–10	West Maegashira #9; 8–7	East Maegashira #3; 5–10
1996	East Maegashira #7; 6–9	East Maegashira #11; 9–6	East Maegashira #3; 5–10	West Maegashira #6; 5–10	West Maegashira #10; 9–6	East Maegashira #3; 4–11
1997	West Maegashira #8; 8–7	East Maegashira #3; 2–12–1	East Maegashira #13; Sat out due to injury 0–0–15	East Maegashira #13; 9–6	West Maegashira #8; 7–8	West Maegashira #9; 6–9
1998	West Maegashira #13; 9–6	East Maegashira #8; 5–10	West Maegashira #12; 9–6	East Maegashira #9; 4–11	East Maegashira #16; 9–6	West Maegashira #11; 8–7
1999	East Maegashira #7; 8–7	West Maegashira #3; 5–10	West Maegashira #7; 6–9	West Maegashira #11; 8–7	West Maegashira #7; 8–7	East Maegashira #4; 5–10 ★
2000	East Maegashira #7; 5–10	East Maegashira #12; 7–8	West Maegashira #13; 5–10	West Jūryō #3; 6–9	East Jūryō #6; 8–7	East Jūryō #5; 8–7
2001	West Jūryō #2; 8–7	West Maegashira #12; 8–7	East Maegashira #9; 2–13	West Jūryō #3; 9–6–P	West Jūryō #1; 7–8	West Jūryō #2; Sat out due to injury 0–0–15
2002	West Jūryō #2; 5–10	West Jūryō #6; 8–7	West Jūryō #2; 2–3–10	East Jūryō #11; Sat out due to injury 0–0–15	East Jūryō #11; Retired; 5–8–2	x
Record given as wins–losses–absences Top division champion Top division runner-up Retired Lower divisions Non-participation Sanshō key: F=Fighting spirit; O=Outstanding performance; T=Technique Also shown: ★=Kinboshi; P=Playoff(s); Divisions: Makuuchi — Jūryō — Makushita — Sandanme — Jonidan — Jonokuchi Makuuchi ranks: Yokozuna — Ōzeki — Sekiwake — Komusubi — Maegashira

== See also ==
- List of sumo record holders
- List of sumo tournament second division champions
- Glossary of sumo terms
- List of past sumo wrestlers
- List of sumo elders
- List of sekiwake
