= Sakahoko Nobushige =

Japanese sumo wrestler (1961–2019)

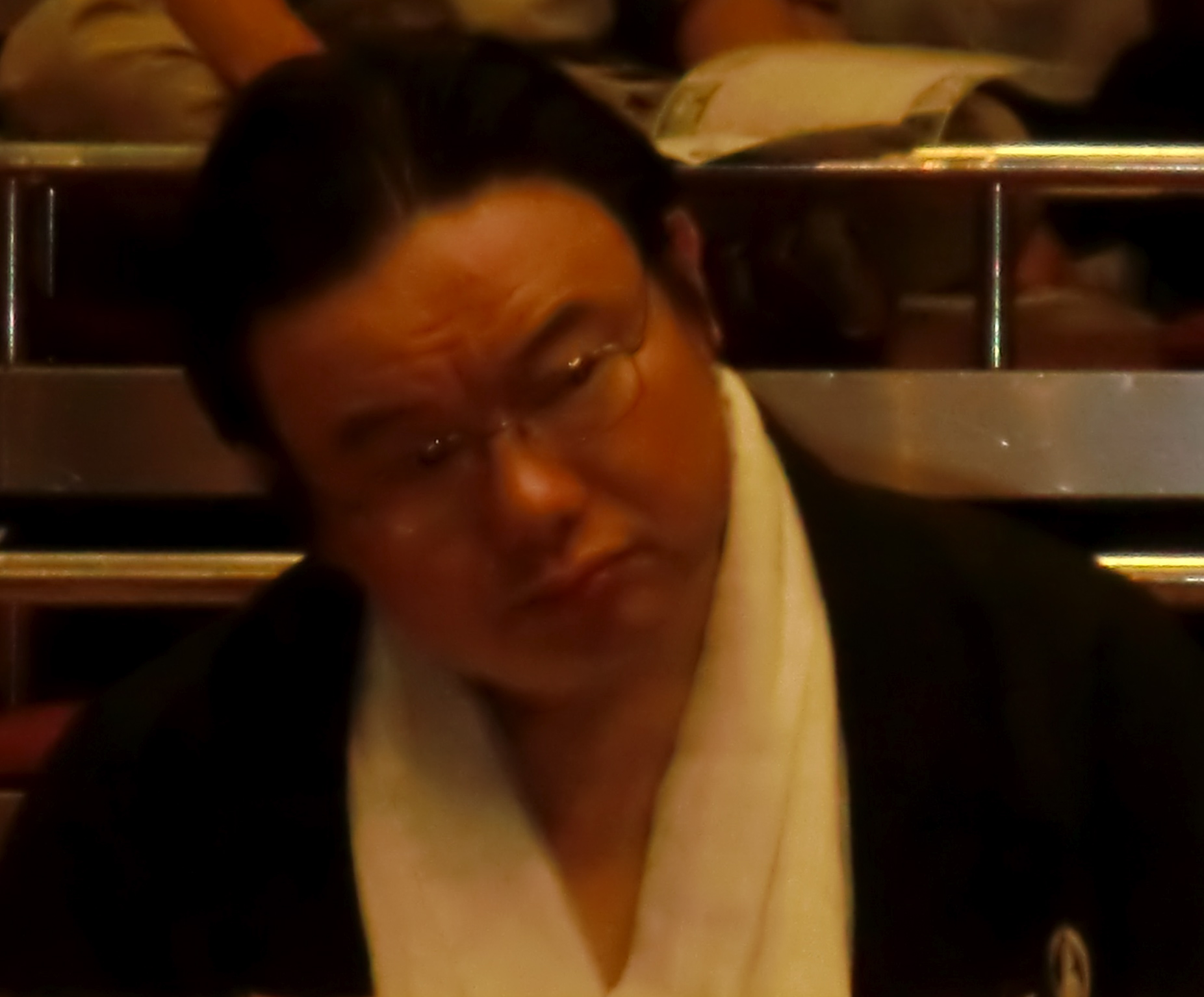
- Sakahoko Nobushige in 2009

Personal information
- Native name: 逆鉾 伸重
- Born: Yoshiaki Fukuzono; 18 June 1961 Kagoshima Prefecture, Japan
- Died: 16 September 2019 (aged 58) Kobe, Japan
- Height: 1.81 m (5 ft 11 1/2 in)
- Weight: 129 kg (284 lb)

Sport
- Sport: Sumo
- Retired: September 1992
- Heya: Izutsu
- Record: 551–567–29
- Debut: January 1978
- Highest rank: Sekiwake (July 1984)
- Elder name: Izutsu
- Championships: (1) Jonokuchi
- Special Prizes: Outstanding Performance (5); Technique (4)
- Gold Stars: 7 (3) Takanosato (2) Chiyonofuji (2)Futahaguro
- Updated on August 2012

Sakahoko Nobushige (born Yoshiaki Fukuzono; 18 June 1961 – 16 September 2019) was a Japanese sumo wrestler. The son of Tsurugamine, he made his professional debut in 1978, reaching the top makuuchi division in 1982. His highest rank was sekiwake. He won nine special prizes and seven gold stars for defeating yokozuna. He retired in 1992 and became the head coach of Izutsu stable in 1994, succeeding his father. He oversaw Kakuryū's promotion to the yokozuna rank in 2014 but also saw the size of his stable decline. He was a deputy director of the Japan Sumo Association and a judge of tournament bouts. He died of pancreatic cancer in 2019. He was the elder brother of fellow top division sumo wrestler Terao Tsunefumi.

== Career ==
Sakahoko made his professional debut in January 1978, dropping out of high school to join Izutsu stable, which was run by his father, ex sekiwake Tsurugamine. His elder brother, Kakureizan, had joined sumo in March 1975, but Sakahoko quickly caught up with him and they made their jūryō debuts together in July 1981. In March 1982 he won out in a rare nine-way playoff to secure the third-division championship. Sakahoko made his debut in the top makuuchi division in November 1982. (His elder brother, meanwhile, never got higher than jūryō 2 and slid down the rankings).

In January 1984 he earned his first kinboshi or gold star for a yokozuna upset when he defeated Takanosato. He celebrated the win making a guts pose on the dohyō, which had not been seen previously from a Japanese wrestler (although Hawaiian Takamiyama had been known to do it). He reached what was to be his highest rank of sekiwake for the first time in July 1984. This was his first ever tournament in the titled san'yaku ranks (jumping over the komusubi rank) and somewhat unusually for a san'yaku debutant he was able to produce a winning score (kachi-koshi) of 8–7. He received the Technique prize for his efforts. In September 1984, the first tournament since new rules for touching down with both fists at the tachi-ai were enforced, he was told to redo his match in which he had seemingly beaten Hokutenyu, and glared at the chief judge, the former Kitanofuji. In March 1985 Sakahoko's younger brother Terao joined him in makuuchi. They were the first pair of brothers to be in the top division simultaneously since Tanikaze and Tatsugesake 200 years before.

In September 1987 he defeated two yokozuna, Chiyonofuji and Futahaguro, and was awarded the Outstanding Performance prize. He was promoted back to sekiwake and proceeded to hold the rank for a then record nine successive tournaments from November 1987 until March 1989, but he was never under consideration for promotion to ōzeki as he could not achieve regular double figure scores, his best result being 9–6. In July 1989, troubled by a shoulder injury, he turned in a 2–13 record and was demoted to the maegashira ranks. He managed to return to komusubi for one tournament in November 1990 but fell to jūryō in 1992 and announced his retirement that September at the age of 31 after 14 years in sumo. (Terao competed for another ten years, until September 2002).

== Retirement from sumo ==
Sakahoko stayed in the sumo world as an elder of the Japan Sumo Association under the toshiyori name of Kasugayama. In 1994, when his father retired, he became Izutsu Oyakata and took over the running of Izutsu stable. The stable had one makuuchi wrestler as of 2019, Kakuryū, who surpassed Sakahoko and his father's achievements by reaching the rank of yokozuna in March 2014. Kakuryū proved to be the only sekitori Izutsu produced, and the stable had just three wrestlers remaining at the time of his death. Izutsu also worked as a judge of tournament bouts and was a deputy Director of the Sumo Association. In May 2016 while on duty as a judge he suffered a broken thigh when Hakuhō gave Yoshikaze an extra shove after the bout was over, causing the wrestler to fall on top of him.

== Fighting style ==
Unlike his brother Terao, who liked pushing and thrusting techniques, Sakahoko took after his father in specialising in yotsu-sumo or grappling techniques. He was well known for favouring the grip on the mawashi with both arms inside the opponent's, called moro-zashi. His most common winning kimarite was overwhelmingly yori-kiri or force out, which accounted for over half his victories at sekitori level.

== Personal life ==
He chose the occasion of taking over as Izutsu Oyakata in 1994 to publicly reveal for the first time that he was married with a seven-year-old daughter. His daughter is now a member of the Takarazuka Revue.. She is married to fellow sumo Shimanoumi Kōyō.

Sakahoko died in Kobe of pancreatic cancer on 16 September 2019. A wake was held on 24 September with the funeral the following day, both at Izutsu stable. His former wrestlers were being looked after by Kagamiyama Oyakata while the Japan Sumo Association decided which stable they will be transferred to. As of 1 October 2019, all personnel belong to Michinoku stable.

In March 2020, his elder brother Kakureizan died, and in December 2023 his younger brother Terao died.

== Career record ==
Sakahoko Nobushige
Year	January Hatsu basho, Tokyo	March Haru basho, Osaka	May Natsu basho, Tokyo	July Nagoya basho, Nagoya	September Aki basho, Tokyo	November Kyūshū basho, Fukuoka
1978	(Maezumo)	West Jonokuchi #14; 6–1; Champion	East Jonidan #45; 4–3	East Jonidan #29; 6–1	East Sandanme #66; 0–1–6	East Jonidan #24; Sat out due to injury 0–0–7
1979	East Jonidan #24; 4–3	West Jonidan #3; 6–1	East Sandanme #43; 4–3	East Sandanme #28; 5–2	West Makushita #60; 2–5	East Sandanme #25; 5–2
1980	West Makushita #59; 5–2	East Makushita #40; 4–3	West Makushita #31; 3–4	East Makushita #40; 4–3	West Makushita #31; 4–3	West Makushita #23; 5–2
1981	West Makushita #10; 5–2	East Makushita #4; 4–3	East Makushita #1; 4–3	West Jūryō #11; 9–6	West Jūryō #9; 8–7	East Jūryō #7; 2–13
1982	West Makushita #9; 6–1	East Makushita #3; 6–1–PPP	West Jūryō #12; 10–5	East Jūryō #2; 8–7	East Jūryō #1; 10–5	West Maegashira #12; 4–10–1
1983	West Jūryō #4; 9–6	West Maegashira #13; 8–7	West Maegashira #5; 7–8	West Maegashira #6; 7–8	West Maegashira #8; 7–8	East Maegashira #9; 9–6
1984	East Maegashira #3; 4–11 ★	West Maegashira #10; 9–6; T	East Maegashira #3; 8–7; O★	West Sekiwake #1; 8–7; T	East Sekiwake #1; 5–10	East Maegashira #4; 6–9 ★
1985	East Maegashira #8; 8–7	West Maegashira #4; 8–7	East Maegashira #1; 6–9	East Maegashira #3; 6–9	West Maegashira #6; 8–7	East Maegashira #1; 6–9
1986	East Maegashira #4; 8–7	East Maegashira #1; 6–9	East Maegashira #3; 5–10	West Maegashira #7; 10–5	West Komusubi #1; 8–7; T	East Komusubi #1; 5–10
1987	West Maegashira #2; 6–9 ★	West Maegashira #5; 9–6	East Maegashira #1; 6–9	East Maegashira #3; 7–8 ★	West Maegashira #4; 8–7; O★★	West Sekiwake #1; 8–7; O
1988	East Sekiwake #1; 9–6; O	East Sekiwake #1; 8–7	East Sekiwake #1; 8–7	East Sekiwake #1; 8–7; O	East Sekiwake #1; 9–6	East Sekiwake #1; 9–6
1989	East Sekiwake #1; 9–6; T	East Sekiwake #1; 7–8	East Komusubi #1; 8–7	West Sekiwake #1; 2–13	East Maegashira #7; 6–9	East Maegashira #12; 10–5
1990	West Maegashira #2; 4–11	West Maegashira #10; 9–6	West Maegashira #2; 5–10	West Maegashira #9; 8–7	West Maegashira #5; 8–7	West Komusubi #1; 5–10
1991	East Maegashira #4; 6–9	West Maegashira #9; 8–7	West Maegashira #5; 6–9	West Maegashira #8; 10–5	West Maegashira #1; 5–10	West Maegashira #7; Sat out due to injury 0–0–15
1992	West Maegashira #7; 6–9	East Maegashira #10; 5–10	West Maegashira #15; 4–11	East Jūryō #5; 5–10	East Jūryō #11; Retired; 4–11	x
Record given as wins–losses–absences Top division champion Top division runner-up Retired Lower divisions Non-participation Sanshō key: F=Fighting spirit; O=Outstanding performance; T=Technique Also shown: ★=Kinboshi; P=Playoff(s); Divisions: Makuuchi — Jūryō — Makushita — Sandanme — Jonidan — Jonokuchi Makuuchi ranks: Yokozuna — Ōzeki — Sekiwake — Komusubi — Maegashira

== See also ==
- Glossary of sumo terms
- List of past sumo wrestlers
- List of sumo elders
- List of sekiwake
