= Sekitori =

Sumo term for high-ranked wrestlers

A sekitori (関取) is a rikishi (力士, sumo wrestler) who is ranked in one of the top two professional divisions: makuuchi and jūryō. The name literally translates to having taken the barrier, as only a relatively small fraction of those who enter professional sumo achieve sekitori status.

Currently there are 70 rikishi in these divisions. The benefits of being a sekitori compared to lower ranked wrestlers are significant and include:

- to receive a salary and bonus (those in the lower divisions merely receive an allowance)
- to have one's own supporters' club
- to wear high quality men's kimono and other items of attire
- to have a private room in the training stable
- to be able to get married and live away from the training stable
- to have junior rikishi to effectively act as their personal servants
- to wear a silk mawashi with stiffened cords (called sagari) in tournament bouts
- to participate in the ring entrance ceremony and wear a keshō-mawashi
- to wear the more elaborate ōichō chonmage hairstyle in competition and on formal occasions
- to become an elder in the Sumo Association if one is sekitori for long enough

== Memorabilia associated with sekitori ==
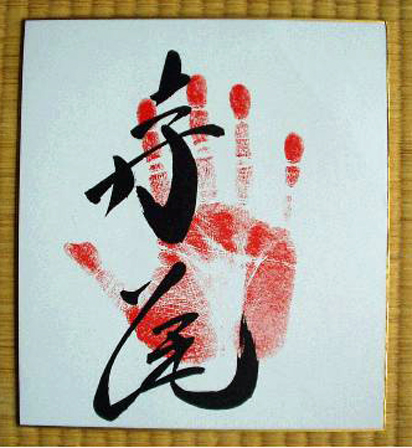
Tegata of the former makuuchi wrestler Terao

The item of memorabilia most often associated with sumo wrestling is tegata (literally hand shape). Only sekitori are allowed to make them for fans. They could be equated to the sumo version of an autograph. Tegata consist of a print of a wrestler's hand using black or red ink accompanied by his ring name written in calligraphic style by the wrestler himself. Original tegata are given out to fans and members of one's supporter club. Printed copies of tegata can also be bought inexpensively.

== Supporter clubs ==
When a wrestler achieves sekitori status, he is allowed to have a fan/supporter club called a kōenkai if he has enough popularity. This is in addition to kōenkai associated with his sumo stable. These clubs often pool their money to buy the wrestler such items as his decorative apron called a keshō-mawashi. For their support, supporter club members expect and receive access to the wrestlers and are given invitations to post-tournament parties and other events where they will have direct contact with them.
