= Toshiyori =

Japan Sumo Association executives

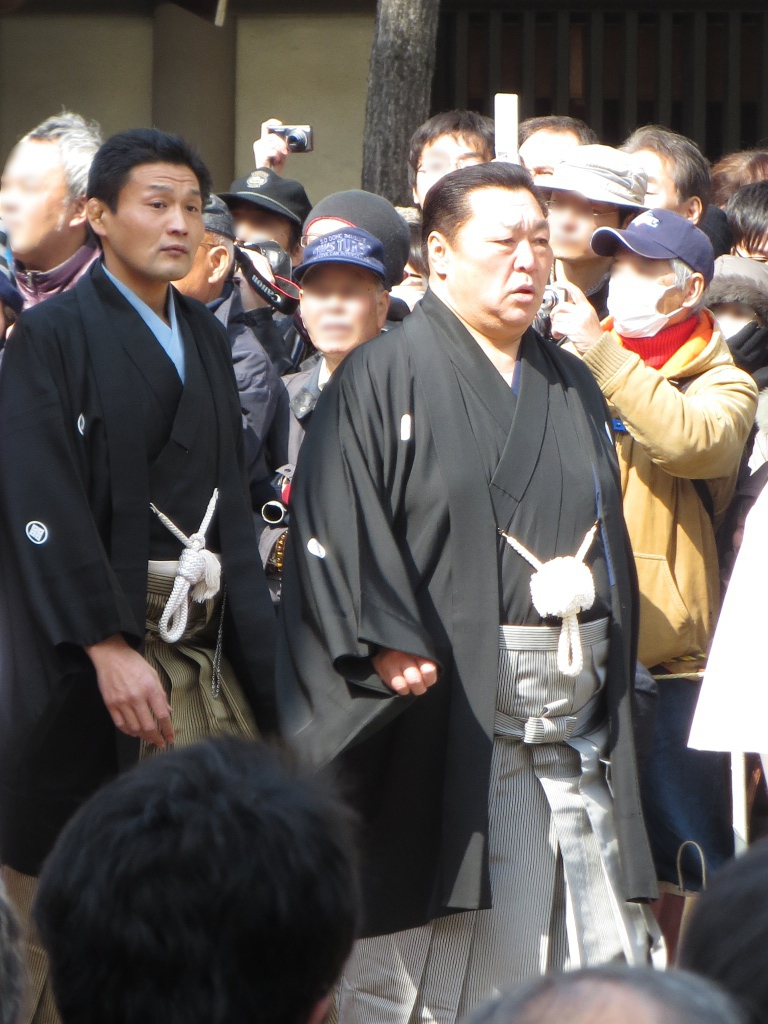
Takanohana and Kitanoumi as toshiyori in 2013

A toshiyori (年寄), also known as an oyakata (親方), is a sumo elder exercising both coaching functions with active wrestlers and responsibilities within the Japan Sumo Association (JSA). All toshiyori are former wrestlers who reached a sufficiently high rank to be eligible to this status. The benefits are considerable, as toshiyori are guaranteed employment until the mandatory retirement age of 65 and are allowed to run and coach in heya (sumo stables), with a comfortable yearly salary averaging around ¥15,000,000 (US$95,000).

Originating from a tradition dating back to the Edo period, the position of toshiyori is founded on a system set up at a time when several sumo associations managed Japan's professional wrestling. To become a toshiyori, a former wrestler has to meet both established and public criteria and be part of a system recognized as opaque. Involving the spending of several million yen to inherit the rights to become a trainer, this system has undergone numerous reforms, firstly limiting the number of people eligible to hold management positions in the Japan Sumo Association, and then more or less partially reforming the system as a whole. Despite this, the position of toshiyori is still highly sought after by wrestlers, maintaining a high level of speculation over the right to practice.

Distributed within the Sumo Association to occupy specific functions, toshiyori also respond to a clear hierarchy, at the top of which are the elected directors of the Japan Sumo Association.

== Designations ==
There are many terms used to define a trainer in the world of professional sumo. Alongside the official term of toshiyori (年寄), a sumo coach is also referred by the terms of oyakata (親方) and shishō (師匠).

Prior to its appearance in the sumo world during the 17th century, the term toshiyori was used primarily in the Edo period and before to refer to central and provincial government administrators as well as community leaders, with a meaning of "senior citizen". For its part, the term oyakata is a suffix used in the honorific system as an honorific attached to proper nouns. Initially the term referred to a person with the status of surrogate parent or big brother, and used to refer to an apprentice master.

The term shishō, or stablemaster, refers specifically to a toshiyori who owns and runs a heya, or sumo stable. At the top of the heya social pyramid, he takes on a paternal role for all under him. Of all the coaches potentially present in the stable, he alone is the owner and therefore the highest authority in communal life.

== History ==
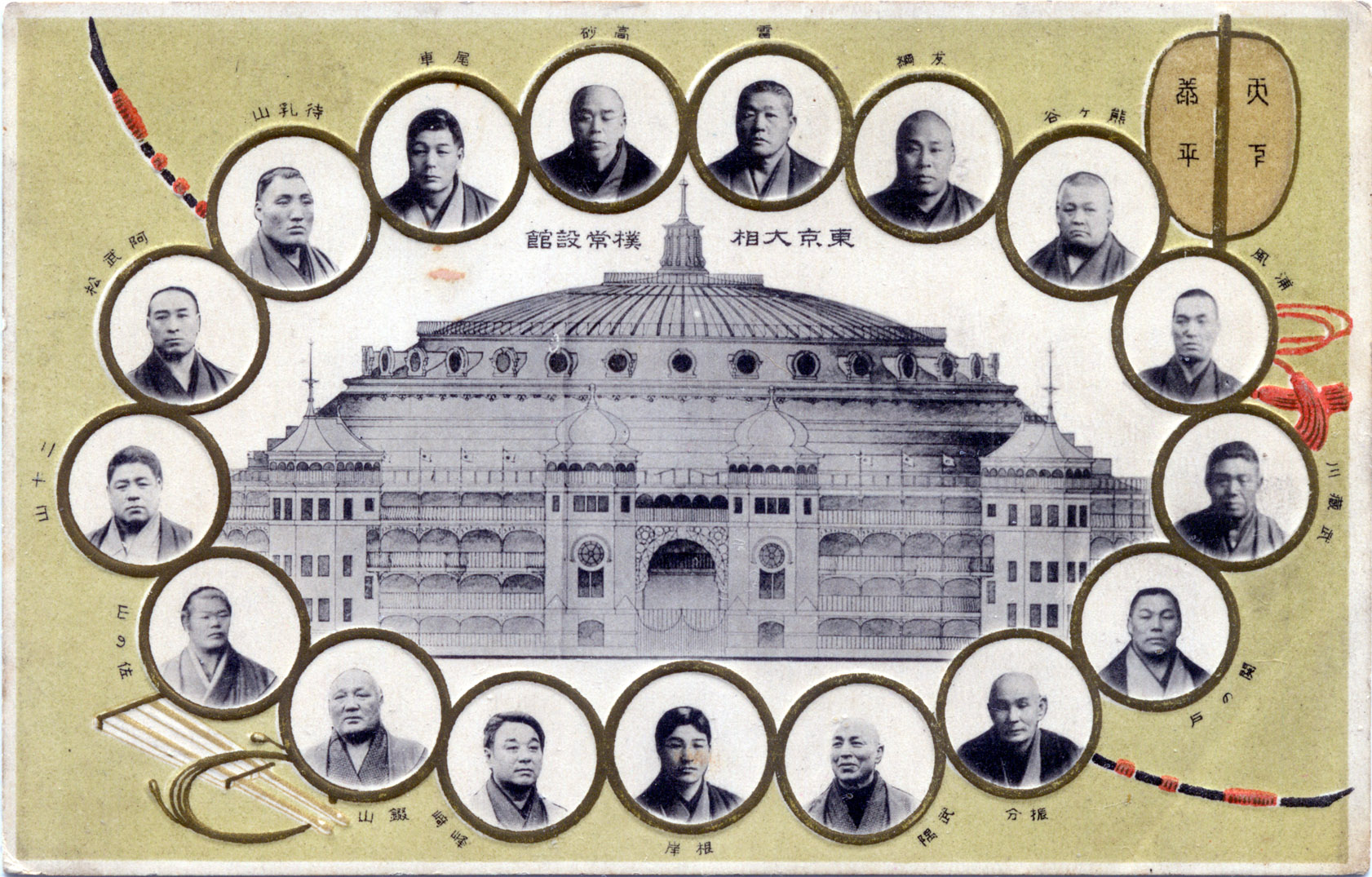
Commemorative postcard of the first Ryōgoku Kokugikan in 1909 surrounded by various toshiyori

The function of sumo elder was born with the organization of the first tournaments authorized by the municipal administrations of major Japanese cities. Although sumo as a sport goes back several centuries, its professionalization dates back to the beginning of the Edo period. During this period, the peace established by the Tokugawa shogunate led to the vagrancy for many samurai who had lost their social standing with their previous masters, who had been deposed or killed so that the shogunate could assert itself. Masterless samurai, called rōnin, had no choice but to put their martial art skills to good use in street sumo tournaments, called tsuji-sumo (辻相撲; lit. 'street-corner wrestling'), for the entertainment of passers-by. Eventually, the mix of disgraced rōnins with the commoners who took part in the contests of strength of the street tournaments created many conflicts over betting money. Tense brawls, even deaths, sometimes occurred. During the Keian era, public order became so disturbed that, in 1648, the Edo authorities issued an edict banning street sumo and matches organized to raise funds during festivities. In 1684 (Jōkyō era), a sumo rōnin named Ikazuchi Gondaiyū obtained permission to lift the sumo ban edicted by the Edo authorities. Because he allowed the return of matches by proposing a new etiquette associated with the conduct of fights, Ikazuchi was recognized as a key interlocutor by the authorities, which earned him a tournament organizer's license referring to him as a "toshiyori", one of the first mentions of the term in sumo. Later, the term was definitively adopted by his successors in the organization of tournaments where it came to be used specifically to refer to the masters at the head of groups of wrestlers who took part in charity tournaments in support of sanctuaries, and who were responsible for enforcing discipline during festivities and avoiding fights. To organize the tournaments, the toshiyori went under their former ring names on delegations to submit petitions to the shogunate officers and secure authorization to hold the tournaments. In parallel with the emergence of toshiyori in the Edo-based sumo association, the associations in the cities of Osaka and Kyoto were organized around elders known as tōdori (頭取).

During the Genroku period, the various sumo groups were no longer scattered across the country, but rather concentrated in the major cities of Edo, Osaka and Kyoto. These groups were self-organised under the leadership of elders, who welcomed the wrestlers into their homes, which took the name of heya (meaning "fraternity house") in reference to the rooms in which these elders met to organise matches during tournaments. In 1719, the Edo municipal authorities issued an edict prohibiting all sumo groups that had not become professionalized from taking part in charity tournaments. The direct consequence of this edict was the disappearance of the elders who came directly from the ranks of the rōnins, and only the elders who were wrestlers who had retired from the ring remained. The organization based on Edo municipality edicts was gradually implemented in the other major sumo associations based in Osaka, Kyoto and Nagoya during the eighteenth century. With the reform of the charity tournaments, the number of elders grew significantly, tripling in Edo between 1720 and 1780. During the Hōreki era, masters began to inherit and assume the names of their predecessors, each share being attached to the ring name of the wrestler who had established himself as a trainer and passed on his license to one of his apprentices. The practice of becoming an elder until death or final retirement also became widespread around this time. From the 1750s onwards, the practice of welcoming novice wrestlers into the elders' homes became more widespread, these houses becoming the first examples of stables.

The practice of allowing former wrestlers to coach new aspirants was eventually capped in 1927, when the sumo associations based in Osaka and Tokyo merged. At that time it was decided that the quota of Tokyo (and its eighty-eight elders) and Osaka (seventeen elders) would form the maximum number of names that could be inherited into the newly proclaimed All Japan Sumo Association. At the beginning of the twentieth century, the conditions for inheriting one's master's name generally became stricter. During the Edo period, any wrestler or referee of any rank could inherit the name of his master, under whose protection he had placed himself, in order to perpetuate his legacy. However, it was decided in 1920 that only wrestlers and referees who had obtained the status of sekitori would be eligible for the privilege of inheriting the names. In 1951, some historical shares (including the name Negishi) were discontinued. In 1958, referees definitively lost their right to inherit a name share.

After the Meiji Restoration, access to toshiyori status was subject to a number of reforms. During the Edo period, when the transmission of the status became established, virtually any wrestler or referee could inherit a share without paying any money, but simply taking responsibility for the livehood of his master and his wife. After World War II, the toshiyori title could be inherited for a few bags of rice, as the period was marked by food shortages. During the 1970s, the question of opening up the toshiyori title, and ultimately the creation of stables, to foreign wrestlers arose for the Japan Sumo Association, the latter declaring firstly that sumo being Japan's national sport, it was inconceivable that a foreigner could participate as a trainer. In 1976, an internal rule defined that only Japanese nationals could become elders, with the unofficial aim of preventing foreigners from having a lasting influence on the sport by occupying decision-making positions within the association. The statement was subsequently severely criticized in the press. There have also been calls for foreign wrestlers with notable careers to benefit from an exceptional regime and inherit toshiyori status. This led the association to correct its position in this regard, with the JSA subsequently declaring that the two rising stars of foreign origin Takamiyama and Kaneshiro would indeed be eligible to become coaches within the association after their retirements. Takamiyama was the first to retire in 1984, becoming a coach under the name Azumazeki and founding Azumazeki stable in 1986, the first foreign-born sumo wrestler to do both. Gradually, the Sumo Association welcomed more and more wrestlers of foreign origin as toshiyori. In 2014, Kotoōshū became the first toshiyori of European origin under the name Naruto. In 2017, Kyokutenhō, who had obtained Japanese nationality in 2005, retired and became the first Mongolian-born wrestler to become toshiyori, taking the name Tomozuna.

Between 1996 and 1998, speculation over share inheritance fees became so intense that Sakaigawa (former Sadanoyama), then chairman of the Sumo Association, proposed a reform of the system, introducing the idea of an outright ban on buying and selling shares and placing unused shares under the association's management. Sakaigawa faced strong opposition from the board of directors, eventually being forced not only to withdraw his reform proposal but also to resign as chairman, the balance of the board shifting from Dewanoumi ichimon to Tokitsukaze ichimon as a result, since an electoral alliance had been formed to oppose the reform in the director elections of the time.

In January 2014, the association shifted to a Public Interest Incorporated Foundation effectively implementing the change from March to coincide with new board of directors elections after difficult negotiations over the status of toshiyori. The articles of association were amended because it was not possible to obtain public foundation status while continuing to authorize what is technically a payment for the right to continue working until retirement age on an unclear market, akin to a black market. Although the system of shares was maintained, it undergone a change of management, becoming a joint share management under the supervision of the Sumo Association and generalizing the theoretical prohibition on the purchase of shares.

== Becoming a toshiyori ==
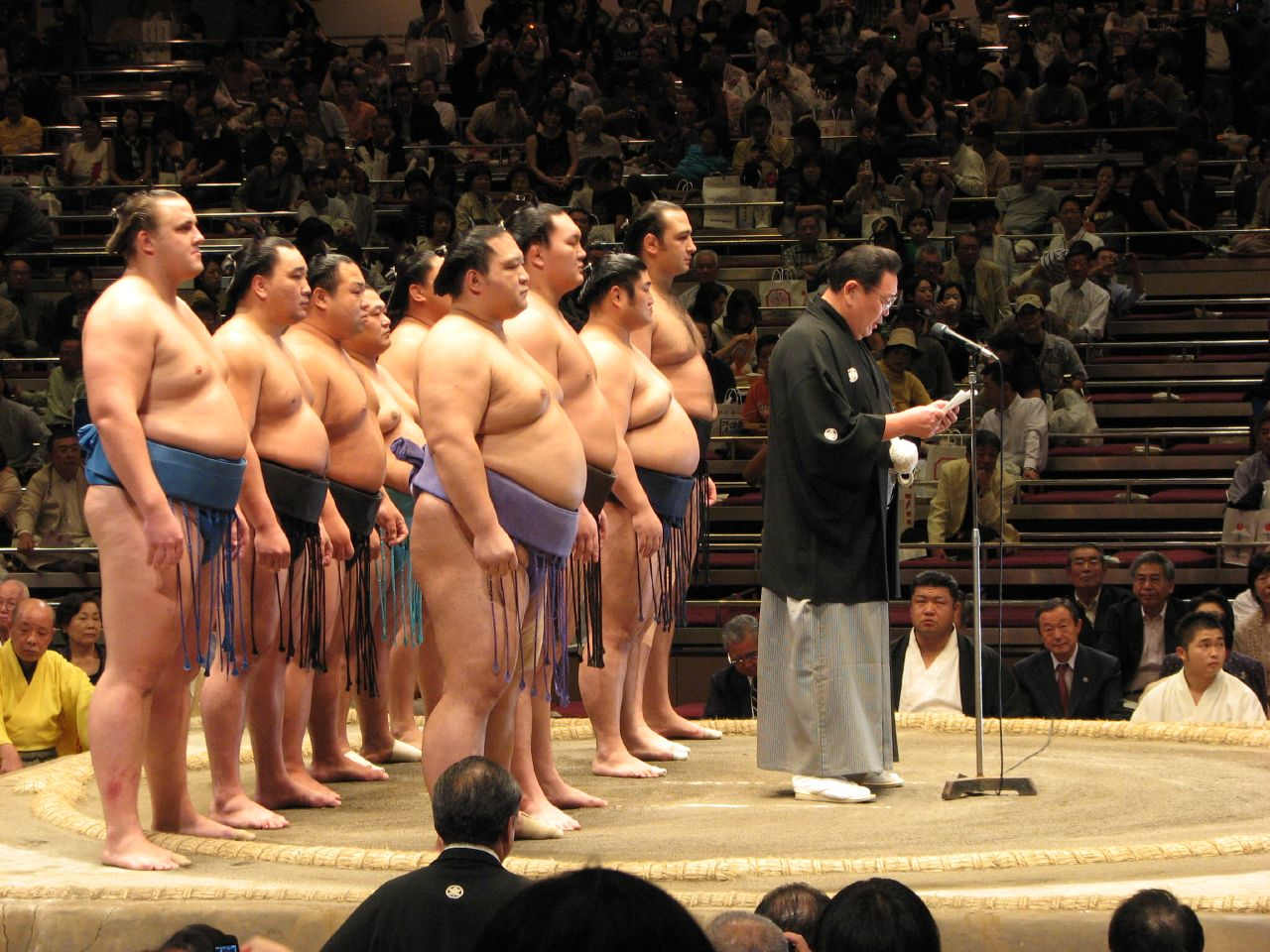
JSA chairman Musashigawa (former Mienoumi) addresses the public at the beginning of the last day of the 2008 September tournament.

The Japan Sumo Association relations between its members are primarily shaped by rules and norms related to the ownership and transfer of "elder shares" held by the association coaches. These shares are known by several names, and can also be referred to as toshiyori kabu, or elder stock. However, all these terms refer to the same situation.

To become a toshiyori, a retired wrestler must first acquire a share, called kabu (株), within the Japan Sumo Association. In professional sumo, a share has the characteristics of an asset, business rights and practice license. Each kabu is named after a myōseki (名跡), a generational family name. Each wrestler inheriting a share has a diploma mentioning the name he has inherited. Although the system dates back to the Edo period, its organization remains opaque.

Current conditions of access to toshiyori status are much stricter than they were in the 1990s. During those years, the conditions were to have competed in one makuuchi tournament or twenty jūryō tournaments. Wrestlers who had competed professionally for a total of twenty-five tournaments in any division were also eligible for a share inheritance. In order to perpetuate the traditions of a particular stable, in the past there was a special rule allowing an apprentice to inherit his stablemaster's share (and thus take over his stable) provided he had participated in at least one tournament in the jūryō division.

=== Common inheritance ===
Only wrestlers who have reached the ranks of san'yaku (meaning yokozuna, ōzeki, sekiwake and komusubi) and have held it for at least one tournament are directly entitled to apply to remain as an executive within the association. Wrestlers who have attained the rank of maegashira must have held their status for twenty tournaments, while jūryō wrestlers must have held theirs for thirty tournaments in the top two divisions. Among sekitori-ranked wrestlers, Yokozuna and ōzeki receive preferential treatment and can remain in the association without acquiring a share for five years (yokozuna) and three years (ōzeki). The wrestler then becomes a coach in the association, in the same way as any other elder, under his ring name and for a fixed period, enabling him to have more time to obtain an authentic share that will allow him to stay in the Sumo Association until the mandatory retirement age.

In September 2021, upon the retirement of former yokozuna Hakuhō, the Sumo Association unusually required him to sign a pledge to uphold "the traditional culture and spirit of sumo", so that he could become a toshiyori under the name Magaki. On his retirement, some elders suggested that conditions be added to the inheritance of the name, such as not operating a stable for a period of ten years, but these were not included in the final pledge.

Share management is closely linked to the families of wrestlers. Since it is not uncommon for several wrestlers to come from the same family, it is commonly accepted that a retiring wrestler can avoid the minimum tournament requirements if he wishes to inherit a share already owned by a family member. In addition, agreements on the transfer of shares remaining within the same family are not traditionally affected by money exchanges. The inheritance of certain shares within a family extends to in-laws. When an elder dies, the management of his share may fall to his family, and more generally to his widow. This type of situation is permitted because, although the name associated with a share can only be used by a former wrestler for activity within the Sumo Association, the diploma associated with it can technically and legally be possessed by a foreign person, putting the Sumo Association in the position of being unable to put pressure on the said outsiders to release the possessed diploma. The situation of a family-run share was illustrated when the former Izutsu (the former Sakahoko) died in 2019, and his share was rented by his family to the former Toyonoshima. Toyonoshima retired from the sport for good, however, when it emerged that the Izutsu share was to be inherited by Shimanoumi, the latter having married Sakahoko's daughter in 2022.

Although shares are essential to the functioning of the Sumo Association, the latter is not directly involved in inheritance matters, although reforms regulate practices. In fact, the inheritance of a share is unique in that the Sumo Association or its board of directors has no theoretical means of influencing the appointment of a successor to a share. Inheritance is based exclusively on a deal between an applicant and his predecessor. Deals are generally no more than oral agreements. The ownership of a share establishes its owner as a manager of the Sumo Association, which has established several rules on the inheritance of shares. A share can be exchanged, making it possible for an elder to own several shares during his coaching career. Elders frequently trade shares because they can be linked to particular stables, and some trades are even made to take over from a stablemaster at the head of a particular stable. However, shares may not be exchanged or loaned to anyone outside the association or who does not meet the inheritance conditions. Although the Sumo Association does not in theory have the power to approve or refuse the transfer of elder shares from the moment the inheritance criteria are met, a retiring wrestler inheriting a kabu must first submit a formal request to the association, called a toshiyori shūmei keishō todoke (年寄襲名継承届). Japanese citizenship is also a prerequisite, and wrestlers of foreign origin must renounce their citizenship and become Japanese citizens before they can apply to become toshiyori. In April 2021, a panel of experts published a report commissioned by the association on the balance between the traditional values of sport and the organization, and the opportunities for extending the influence of sport. The report stated that obtaining Japanese nationality was necessary because toshiyori must have "an intimate understanding of the distinct aspects of Japanese culture and customs". Although the association allows great freedom in the inheritance of shares, it can also exert pressure behind the scenes to disqualify the inheritance for wrestlers involved in scandals, which was notably the case for former komusubi Itai, during the match-fixing scandal, who was denied the inheritance of the Ōnaruto share and ultimately the inheritance of the associated stable, the latter closing upon the retirement of former sekiwake Kōtetsuyama.

Shares are theoretically managed within the same ichimon (groups of stables), with larger clans offering more shares for their wrestlers to inherit when they retire. Since ichimon also serve as political factions within the Sumo Association, share owners belonging to one clan are relatively reluctant to cede a share to a member of another clan. Stable closures and share loans are an opportunity to see names change clan. When, in 2010, Ajigawa (the former Kōbō) voted against the interests of his clan (Tatsunami ichimon) to support the election of Takanohana, the owner of his share (Aminishiki, then still active) asked him to return the name, so that the Ajigawa share would not be managed in the Takanohana ichimon. Also, at the time of former yokozuna Kakuryū's retirement, his interest in the Otowayama share was not seen as a sound investment, as the share was managed within the Nishonoseki ichimon and Kakuryū had wrestled within the Tokitsukaze ichimon. Kakuryū did, however, manage to inherit the share and open the eponymous stable, implying that his inheritance of the Otowayama name was definitive and not simply rented. Also, when the former Sadanofuji (Dewanoumi ichimon) retired, he rented the Nakamura name to its owner, Yoshikaze (Nishonoseki ichimon). It is also forbidden to pass on shares to persons outside the association.

In the event of a dispute over the terms of inheritance of a share between two masters, the Sumo Association may request the resignation of a master on the grounds that possession of the share has not been resolved as a result of the dispute, and that the supposed heir does not actually possess the rights to his kabu, with associated diploma. This was notably the case during the inheritance dispute over the Kasugayama name between the former Kasugafuji and his heir Hamanishiki, which led to the closure of Kasugayama stable and the incorporation of its wrestlers into the Isegahama ichimon.

All former wrestlers who have secured possession of a kabu must relinquish it when they reach the age of 65, which marks the compulsory retirement age within the Sumo Association.

=== Renting process ===
Since shares are difficult to obtain, an active wrestler who matches the inheritance criteria and who has already secured possession of a share can rent it to a retired wrestler in a process known as kari-kabu (借株). This system enables the tenant of the share to work as a toshiyori, while also having more time to obtain a share of his own. For the annuitant, this system ensures an inflow of cash without encroaching on the use of his share, which he retains in full ownership. Since an elder is allowed to own several kabu, some can afford to rent a share while awaiting the retirement of their designated successor. This was notably the case for former ōzeki Kirishima Kazuhiro, who rented the Shikoroyama share from his master, the former Izutsu (former sekiwake Tsurugamine), after his retirement, when the latter had already ceded his Izutsu share to his son (Sakahoko) and was waiting to cede the Shikoroyama name to his second son (Terao). The game of inheritance through share loans has often been compared to a game of musical chairs. Most of the time such arrangements leave a bittersweet feeling, as the tenants of the shares have to keep looking to buy a perennial share or have to leave the Sumo Association. Although it's not uncommon for an elder to have to change names several times during his coaching career in order to stay within the Sumo Association, some, like the former Wakajishi, were known for their impressive luck in always finding a name to borrow. The latter managed to borrow no less than eleven different names between 1983 and 1996. When the a Sumo Association changed its statutes to those of a Public Interest Incorporated Foundation, the lending and borrowing of shares was theoretically prohibited.

=== Extraordinary process ===
An exception to the normal acquisition is made for the most successful rikishi, with era-defining yokozuna being offered a "single generation" or "lifetime" elder share, called ichidai toshiyori kabu (一代年寄株). This process allows a wrestler to stay as an elder without having to use a traditional share in the association, and enter his retirement duties with his ring name. Only wrestlers with extraordinary careers were eligible for this privilege. These elder shares are called "single generation" because they cease to exist after their owners retire, making it impossible for other retired wrestlers to inherit them.

This single generation share has been offered to three former wrestlers : Taihō, Kitanoumi and Takanohana. A fourth, Chiyonofuji, was offered this status but preferred a normal share and became known as Kokonoe. Since all the holders were yokozuna who had completed more than twenty yūshō (championship victories), this prerequisite became a traditional milestone for obtaining the single generation share.

This system of obtaining toshiyori status is the only way to sustainably extend the maximum number of elders within the association. During the 1990s, 107 elders coexisted, with the 105 classic shares and Taihō and Kitanoumi, who had both earned the right to become elders under their ring names.

In October 2021, Yokozuna Hakuhō, the Emperor's Cup number record holder, retired and it was expected that he would earn the right to inherit a Hakuhō share in view of his sporting exploits. Hakuhō was however denied the ichidai toshiyori kabu and Masayuki Yamauchi (a Yokozuna Deliberation Council member) declared to a press conference that "no such system exists" under the new Public Interest Incorporated Foundation statutes of the association, implying that the system would no longer be used. Following the announcement, many critics shared the indignation of not allowing the greatest champion in the history of professional sumo to benefit from this honor, notably accusing the advisory and expert bodies of being more conservative than the personalities from the sport themselves, or of being obsessed by the image of a purely Japanese (Note: Hakuhō was born in Mongolia, and obtained Japanese citizenship in 2019.) sumo, devoid of foreign influence. In particular, several informal comments made to the press referred to the concern of certain Sumo Association executives about Hakuhō's attitude, resurrecting fears of once again having to deal with internal tumult like that caused by Takanohana Kōji, who had enjoyed the honors of the ichidai toshiyori kabu.

== Value and rarity ==
=== Rarity ===
The value of elder shares lies in the fact that many wrestlers have dedicated their lives to the sport, some turning professional before their twenties. When they retire, most wrestlers fall back into anonymity, in a society that offers little in the way of cover for former wrestlers, most of whom are injured. Elder shares therefore represent the last hope of remaining in the sporting world, with the assurance of a salary and the support of their peers. The limited number of shares, their unequal distribution between clans and the inability of some younger generations of wrestlers to find coaching positions were cited as fears that the sport was suffering from atrophy. Lack of share is also cited by wrestlers as one of the reasons why they push themselves beyond their own limits and continue their active wrestling careers beyond reason in the hope that a share will become available.

The number of shares has been fixed, in particular to avoid the proliferation of unnecessary titles. The transfer of a share to a new owner is not automatic, and prospective buyers must wait until an elder has left the association, usually because he has reached the maximum age for membership of the association (set at 65 years old), to obtain his share. In the event of the death of an elder, a purchaser can also obtain the share through the deceased's family. In the latter case, the new buyer is traditionally expected to provide financially for the family of the deceased, although transfers are often simply settled with a sum of money.

=== Payment ===
It can take several years for a share to become available for purchase, during which time many wrestlers retire without being able to continue as coaches in the Sumo Association. Acquiring a share is extremely difficult, as the elders' privileged status within the association, with a guaranteed position and salary, develops a strong demand among retired wrestlers, which keeps the monetary value of a share very high. Purchase prices are never disclosed. The estimated value of a share was often given at around millions of yen, at the very least, being traded in the 1990s at around ¥200 million. Under the new Sumo Association statutes, share purchase prices are still said to be negotiated in millions of yen. Price estimates are made possible, despite the relative secrecy of inheritance negotiations, by court cases opposing the masters over promised and paid inheritance fees (which was the case with the inheritance of the Tatsunami share between Haguroyama and Asahiyutaka), and also by tax returns that highlight the sums received for the inheritance of shares (which was the case when Wakanohana I sold the Futagoyama share to his brother Takanohana Kenshi and had to explain to the Tokyo tax office a failure to declare 300 million yen). After the association became a Public Interest Incorporated Foundation, the sale of shares was theoretically prohibited, under threats of disciplinary action up to and including expulsion. Under the new statutes, all names are theoretically managed by the Sumo Association itself, with the elders retaining the right to recommend successors. Although the payment of sums of money to guarantee an inheritance has been a subject of debate, the association has agreed to allow the payment of a (seemingly optional) consultancy fee. If such fees were paid, an annual report would be required and validated by the association. Finally, the rented-share system was theoretically abolished. Although a period of three years was decided for the implementation of the new rules, the press reported that the Sumo Association had, at best, adopted a laissez-faire attitude and, at worst, had carried out a façade reform, because the consultation fees paid to a former shareholder seem to make no difference to the inheritance fees paid under the old statutes, in effect maintaining the old purchase system. The annual survey on share purchasing was also seen as an excuse, as no rigorous criteria had been set out at the time of the change in status. However, one of the effects of the change in status, however, was a collapse in the value of shares after a period of intense speculation. At the time of the change of status, 10% of shares were vacant due to the retirement of the oldest elders and the uncertainty that investment would continue under the new status. Unusually, there are also situations where an inheritance takes place without the exchange of money, as was the case when the former Ishiura inherited the Magaki share from the former Chikubayama.

The purchase of elder shares is negotiated by spending accumulated bonuses and salaries and by the participation of support groups (called koenkai). It is impossible for retired wrestlers to call banks and take loans, as the Sumo Association prohibits the use of shares as collateral for debts. Only high-ranking wrestlers can have earned enough during their active career to buy shares on their own, and only popular wrestlers can count on the support of koenkai. Although the elder share market creates a strong monetary value attached to share ownership, the Sumo Association does not recognize a specific monetary value for elder shares. Due to speculation, it is generally unprofitable to invest in an elder share, as the salary associated with the status never makes up for the amount spent to obtain the title when the wrestler retired. A large number of wrestlers eligible for a share inheritance are unable to remain in the sport as coaches, precisely because they are in high demand and therefore rare and expensive.

== Known shares ==
=== List of normal shares ===
There are 105 names used to refer to elders within the Sumo Association, all dating back to the early eighteenth century and before. The current number of shares was defined at the time of the merger between the Tokyo and Osaka sumo associations in 1927. At the time, the Osaka association was composed of 17 elders while the Tokyo association was headed by 88 elders. Since the merger, the official elder shares are:

Name of the share		Origins and observations
Rōmaji transliteration	Japanese	Origins and observations
Ajigawa	安治川	The name originates from Takashima stable with the former komusubi Tomoegata (later transferred to Tomozuna stable). After his retirement, he took the name Tamagaki before reviving in 1942 the tradition of the Ajigawa name, which had been discontinued after the merger between the Tokyo and Osaka sumo associations.
Araiso	荒磯	
Arashio	荒汐	
Asahiyama	朝日山	
Asakayama	浅香山	
Azumazeki	東関	
Chiganoura	千賀ノ浦	
Dekiyama	出来山	The name originates from the Edo-based sumo association of the Tenmei era.
Dewanoumi	出羽海	An iconic name in professional sumo, Dewanoumi comes from the Kansei era and was the origin of a wrestler named Dewanoumi Unemon. He and the first successor to his name (Shikamazu Takiemon) were wrestlers who benefited from the patronage of the Shōnai Domain, and Unemon was originally named after the Dewa Province where the fiefdom of his lords was located.
Edagawa	枝川	
Fujigane	富士ヶ根	
Fujishima	藤島	The name originates from the Edo-based sumo association of the Tenmei era.
Furiwake	振分	
Futagoyama	二子山	
Hakkaku	八角	
Hamakaze	浜風	The name originates from the Edo-based sumo association of the Tenmei era.
Hanakago	花籠	The name originates from the Edo-based sumo association of the Tenmei era.
Hanaregoma	放駒	
Hatachiyama	二十山	The name originates from the Edo-based sumo association of the Tenmei era.
Hidenoyama	秀ノ山	The name emerged at the end of the eighteenth century when it was used by a komusubi called Hidenoyama Denjirō, who was still an active wrestler and used the two-licence system to be both a trainer and an active wrestler. In 1828, his name and stable were inherited by former ōzeki Genjiyama.
Ikazuchi	雷	The name originates from the Edo-based sumo association during the Tenmei era. In 1684, the Edo authorities were petitioned by a sumo rōnin named Ikazuchi Gondaiyū, who obtained permission to lift the ban and hold a tournament after proposing a new etiquette associated with matches organization.
Inagawa	稲川	
Irumagawa	入間川	The name originates from the Edo-based sumo association during the Tenmei era.
Isegahama	伊勢ヶ濱	The name first appeared when the fifth Shikimori Inosuke, a gyōji, began training wrestlers using the two-licence system.
Isenoumi	伊勢ノ海	The name originates from the Edo-based sumo association of the Tenmei era. The name originates from the Shikimori gyōji family-line. This family was founded by a former wrestler who became an elder under the name Isenoumi Godaiyū. Isenoumi himself was named after the Ise Bay. Isenoumi later changed his name to Shikimori Godaiyū and launched his own line of referees, while his initial name was kept as an elder share.
Iwatomo	岩友	
Izutsu	井筒	The name originates from the Edo-based sumo association of the Tenmei era.
Jinmaku	陣幕	The name originates from the Osaka-based sumo association.
Kabutoyama	甲山	
Kagamiyama (Note: Although spelled similarly, two shares named Kagamiyama coexisted in the Tokyo and Osaka based sumo association until both merged in 1927, at which point only the Tokyo line survived when the Osaka line was discontinued.)	鏡山	
Kasugano	春日野	
Kasugayama	春日山	The name originates from the Edo-based sumo association of the Tenmei era.
Kataonami	片男波	The name originates from the Edo-based sumo association of the Tenmei era. The name is inspired by Kataonami beach in Wakayama.
Katsunoura	勝ノ浦	The name originates from the Edo-based sumo association of the Tenmei era.
Kimigahama	君ヶ濱	
Kiriyama	桐山	The name originates from the Edo-based sumo association of the Tenmei era.
Kise	木瀬	The name originates from the Edo-based sumo association of the Tenmei era. The name is a contraction of the name of its first holder, the gyōji Kimura Sehei (木村瀬平), who obtained the right to train wrestlers while continuing his activities as a referee. His name is then considered a share in its own right and is inherited by the ninth Kimura Shōnosuke.
Kitajin	北陣	
Kiyomigata	清見潟	The name originates from the Edo-based sumo association of the Tenmei era.
Kokonoe	九重	The name originates from the Edo-based sumo association of the Tenmei era.
Kumagatani	熊ヶ谷	
Kumegawa	粂川	The name originates from the Edo-based sumo association of the Tenmei era.
Magaki	間垣	The name originates from the Edo-based sumo association of the Tenmei era.
Matsuchiyama	待乳山	
Matsugane	松ヶ根	
Michinoku	陸奥	
Mihogaseki	三保ヶ関	The name has its origins in the Osaka-based sumo association. There, it was an iconic share before the two associations merged. Mihogaseki was also the name of a stable that had the distinction of being managed by a wrestler trained in a Mihogaseki stable until the retirement of Masuiyama II in 2013.
Minato	湊	
Minatogawa	湊川	
Minezaki	峰崎	
Miyagino	宮城野	The founder of the name is former sekiwake Miyagino Nishikinosuke, who was named after a locality under the control of his patrons of the Sendai Domain (now Miyagi prefecture).
Musashigawa	武蔵川	The name originates from the Edo-based sumo association of the Tenmei era.
Nakadachi	中立	The name origin is linked to the fourth Kimura Shōnosuke, a gyōji who obtained the right to train wrestlers while continuing his activities as a referee under the name Nakadachi Shōnosuke (中立庄之助).
Nakagawa	中川	
Nakamura	中村	
Naruto	鳴戸	The name originates from the Edo-based sumo association of the Tenmei era.
Nishiiwa	西岩	
Nishikido	錦戸	
Nishikijima	錦島	
Nishonoseki	二所ノ関	The name originated in the late Edo period with former ōzeki Nishonoseki Gunemon who obtained the right to train recruits and continue to compete in tournaments under the double-licence system. Gunemon's name is said to have been inspired by the Nisho shrines that were set up on the edge of the Ōshū Kaidō, on the border of the Hachinohe Domain, which was patron to Gunemon. Today, the stone marking the border is still called Nisho's barrier (二所の関, Nishonoseki).
Oguruma	尾車	
Oitekaze	追手風	The name originates from the Edo-based sumo association of the Tenmei era.
Ōnaruto	大鳴戸	
Onoe	尾上	The name originates from the Edo-based sumo association of the Tenmei era.
Onogawa	小野川	
Ōnomatsu	阿武松	The name originated with the promotion of Ōnomatsu (later regarded as sumo's sixth yokozuna) to the rank of ōzeki in October 1826. Ōnomatsu was given his definitive ring name by his patrons of the Chōshū domain to evoke a famous scenic spot in Hagi, Yamaguchi.
Ōshima	大島	
Oshiogawa	押尾川	The name originates from the Osaka-based sumo association.
Ōtake	大嶽	
Otowayama	音羽山	The name originates from the Edo-based sumo association of the Tenmei era.
Ōyama	大山	The name originates from the Edo-based sumo association of the Tenmei era.
Sadogatake	佐渡ヶ嶽	The name has its origins with a Meiwa era maegashira by the name of Sadogatake Sawaemon, who himself took his name from Sado Island. The name is later attested as that of a toshiyori in the Edo-based sumo association of the Tenmei era.
Sakaigawa	境川	
Sanoyama	佐ノ山	Formerly written 佐野山, the name originates from the Edo-based sumo association of the Tenmei era.
Sekinoto	関ノ戸	
Sendagawa	千田川	
Shibatayama	芝田山	
Shikihide	式秀	The name is a contraction of the name of its first holder, the gyōji Shikimori Hidegorō (式守秀五郎), who obtained the right to train wrestlers while continuing his activities as a referee. At first a name in the gyōji hierarchy, Hidegorō became an official name when the third holder of the title succeeded in imposing his name as a fully-fledged trainer's licence.
Shikoroyama	錣山	The name originates from the Edo-based sumo association of the Tenmei era.
Shiranui	不知火	
Shiratama	白玉	The name originates from the Edo-based sumo association of the Tenmei era.
Taganoura	田子ノ浦	The name originates from the Edo-based sumo association of the Tenmei era.
Takadagawa	高田川	
Takasago	高砂	The name comes from Takasago Uragorō, who, after his retirement, kept his ring name and trained his own recruits. The name itself comes from a Himeji Domain legacy inspired by the Takasago-no-Ura (高砂の浦), a famous beach in Harima Province (now Takasago in Hyōgo Prefecture).
Takasaki	高崎	
Takashima	高島	
Takekuma	武隈	
Takenawa	竹縄	
Tamagaki	玉垣	The name originates from the Edo-based sumo association of the Tenmei era.
Tamanoi	玉ノ井	The name originates from the Edo-based sumo association of the Tenmei era.
Tanigawa	谷川	
Tatekawa	立川	The name originates from the Edo-based sumo association of the Tenmei era.
Tateyama	楯山	The name originates from the Edo-based sumo association of the Tenmei era.
Tatsunami	立浪	The name as a coach's share has its origins in the Meiji Restoration and former maegashira Onigasaki Tsunanosuke, but the reason for its choice is not explained by the sumo historiography.
Tatsutagawa	立田川	The name originates from the Edo-based sumo association of the Tenmei era.
Tatsutayama	立田山	
Tokitsukaze	時津風	The name Tokitsukaze has its origins in the Osaka-based sumo association and had long been used for eleven generations before its incorporation into the Tokyo association.
Tokiwayama	常盤山	The name originates from the Edo-based sumo association of the Tenmei era.
Tomozuna	友綱	The name originates from the Edo-based sumo association of the Tenmei era.
Urakaze	浦風	The name originates from the Edo-based sumo association of the Tenmei era.
Wakafuji	若藤	
Wakamatsu	若松	The name originates from the Edo-based sumo association of the Tenmei era.
Yamahibiki	山響	
Yamashina	山科	
Yamawake	山分	

=== Historical shares ===
Before the establishment of a fixed number of elder shares, the various sumo associations had lineages of elders whose legacy of names has now disappeared. Others, such as the names of the two tate-gyōji, or those of wrestlers who became elder under the lifetime share system, have been discontinued and can no longer be used as elder shares.

Name of the share		Observation
Rōmaji transliteration	Japanese	Observation
Akaō	赤翁	Used by former ōzeki Hiodoshi after his retirement.
Akitsushima	秋津嶋	
Araiwa	荒岩	
Asogatake	阿蘇ヶ嶽	
Chitosegawa	千歳川	
Gofuku	呉服	
Goshoguruma	御所車	
Goshonoura	御所ヶ浦	
Izumigawa	出水川	
Kagamiyama	鏡山	
Kagura	神楽	
Kimenzan	鬼面山	
Kimura Shōnosuke	木村 庄之助	Name of the senior tate-gyōji. Considered an elder share in respect of their rank.
Kitanoumi	北の湖	Lifetime share of the eponymous yokozuna Kitanoumi. The share disappeared at his death in 2015.
Komatsuyama	小松山	
Kujiranami	鯨波	
Kusakaze	草風	
Matawatetsu	捻鉄	
Matsugae	松ヶ枝	
Minanogawa	男女ノ川	
Nagahama	永浜	
Nanatsumori	四賀峰	
Natorigawa	名取川	
Negishi	根岸	Elder share discontinued in 1951. Previously considered as a formal share created in honor of a printer called Mikawa Jiemon who was in charge of printing the banzuke (sumo rankings sheet). At the time of their disappearance, the Negishi elders had been responsible for the banzuke calligraphy since the mid-eighteenth century.
Ōhashi	大橋	
Ōikazuchi	大雷	Honorary title of former yokozuna Umegatani I.
Ōkido	大木戸	
Shikimori Inosuke	式守 伊之助	Name of the junior tate-gyōji. Considered an elder share in respect of their rank.
Taihō	大鵬	Lifetime share of the eponymous yokozuna Taihō. The share ceased to exist at Taihō's definitive retirement.
Takanohana	貴乃花	Lifetime share of the eponymous yokozuna Takanohana. The share disappeared with his resignation and retirement in 2018.
Takeshima	竹嶋	
Tomagashima	笘ヶ嶋	
Yatsugamine	八ッヶ峰	
Yukimiyama	雪見山	
Yotsugamine	四賀峰	

== Hierarchy ==
The toshiyori are not all equal within the Japan Sumo Association. Historically, the beginnings of a hierarchical organization developed around the 1780s, when the highly profitable charity tournaments were organized. During this period, the main tournament organizer and his assistant emerged as the two most important elders of the Edo-based sumo association. Nowadays, positions of influence are shared out in elections held at the end of two-year terms of office.

=== Ranking ===
Much like other staff members of the JSA (such as referees and ushers), elders are also subject to a rank structure; only the lowest-ranking members are strictly known as toshiyori. The current ranks are as follows:

- Rijichō (理事長, Chairman), primus inter pares among riji
- Riji (理事, Director)
- Fuku-riji (副理事, Deputy director)
- Yakuin taigū iin (役員待遇委員, Special executive)
- Iin (委員, Committee member)
- Shunin (主任, Senior member)
- Iin taigū toshiyori (委員待遇年寄, Elder receiving sitting committee privileges)
- Toshiyori (年寄, Elder)
- San'yo (参与, Consultant), elders re-hired as consultant between 65 and 70 years old

When retiring, yokozuna and ōzeki who secured the possession of a share receive automatic promotion to the "Committee Member" rank and are granted the right to sit on committees within the association. Newly retired toshiyori who received sitting committee privileges are entitled to attend meetings of the board of directors but are not yet entitled to vote on the decisions taken there.

The toshiyori who sit as fuku-riji and riji must first be elected by all the elders assembled in a board of trustees called hyōgiin-kai (評議員会). Those who obtain the status of fuku-riji must also be appointed by the board of directors. In the Sumo Association's internal organization, fuku-riji serve as assistants to the department heads. Yakuin taigu iin are named to their position by the chief director.

Directors, called riji, are elected by a single anonymous vote by all the elders in the board of trustees, from candidates selected among the toshiyori. Since 1968, the number of directors on the board has been limited to ten elders, although it was also noted that the number of members of the board of directors could be extended to a maximum of fifteen persons if needed.

The board of directors elects a chairman, called rijichō, from among themselves. Directors other than the chairman serve as department heads. Among them, the role of Operations director (事業部長, jigyō buchō) is considered to be the association's number 2. Each board member serves a two-year term.

In 2014, the association introduced a system of re-employment for up to five years for elders who had reached the normal retirement age of 65. Under this system, an elder can remain a member of the Sumo Association while retaining his share, albeit limited to an advisory role as he is not authorized to be a stablemaster or hold a decision-making position within the association. Furthermore, elders who benefit from this system are only re-employed at 70% of their initial salary. Since san'yo are re-employed and can only have limited responsibilities, they occupy the lowest rank in the toshiyori hierarchy within the Sumo Association.

Still in 2014, a counselor committee was introduced to facilitate dialogue between the ministry and the association. This committee, called hyōgi-in (評議員), is made up equally of retired wrestlers (who were not re-employed under the san'yo consultant system) elected within the association and personalities appointed by the ministry. Their rank equals that of a director to the association's board. Elders on the committee are not allowed to concurrently serve as toshiyori within the Sumo Association, because of the committee authority that allows them to have a say in the appointment and dismissal of directors. Each counselor serves a term of four years. Having the task of "overseeing the execution of duties by the directors", auditors may attend meetings of the board of directors and the board of trustees, but have no voting rights. Former association-elected members who decide to return to the association after their term on the hyōgi-in may do so after being auditioned by a reviewing committee.

In the world of professional sumo, where banzuke (and therefore rank) plays a predominant role, a former wrestler who has become a toshiyori is always referred to by his highest achieved rank. A wrestler is sometimes even considered a second-rate elder if he hasn't achieved a sufficiently high rank in his active career, and this consideration sometimes prevents him from occupying important positions in the association's organization after his retirement.

=== Salary ===
The elders of the Association receive a salary that depends on their rank within the association. The general monthly income of a toshiyori (as of 2018) ranges from ¥1,032,000, for a hierarchical position equivalent to that of toshiyori –which is the lowest rank in the hierarchy– to ¥1,448,000, which corresponds to the income of a director's position.

Salaries (in yen) by rank in the Sumo Association are (as of 2018):

Position			Basic salary	Bonus	
Rank	Rōmaji transliteration	Japanese	Basic salary	Bonus	
Rank	Rōmaji transliteration	Japanese	Basic salary	Basic allocation	Meeting bonus
Chairman	Rijichō	理事長	¥1,16 million	¥288,000	¥50,000
Director	Riji	理事	¥1,16 million	¥288,000	¥50,000
Deputy Director	Fuku-riji	副理事	¥1,02 million	¥249,000	¥50,000
Committee Member	Iin	委員	¥830,000	¥202,000	¥50,000
Senior Member	Shunin	主任	¥700,000	¥175,000	¥50,000
Elder	Toshiyori	年寄	¥650,000	¥158,000	¥50,000
Consultant	San'yo	参与	¥700,000	¥175,000	None

In addition to their salaries, toshiyori are also eligible for a number of contextual bonuses:

Additional bonuses (directors only)
Designation		Bonus amount (monthly)
Headquarter bonus	Chairman	¥50,000
Headquarter bonus	Director	¥40,000
Year-end bonus	Chairman	¥1,1 million
Year-end bonus	Director	¥800,000
Retirement allowance	Chairman	¥1 million
Retirement allowance	Director	¥700,000

Seniority bonus
Years of service	Bonus amount (monthly)
6 years and more	¥5,000
11 years and more	¥8,000
16 years and more	¥11,000
21 years and more	¥14,000
26 years and more	¥17,000
31 years and more	¥20,000

Regional tournaments bonuses (for directors)
Tournament	Bonus amount
Osaka	¥1,550 million
Nagoya	¥1,550 million
Fukuoka	¥1,700 million

Regional tour (for directors)
Per day	¥20,000

=== Disciplinary measures ===
Like active wrestlers toshiyori may be subject to disciplinary measures.

The Japan Sumo Association punishments consists of seven levels (from lightest to heaviest punishment): reprimand, salary reduction, suspension from competition, suspension from association business, demotion, recommendation to retire and dismissal.

It seems that in the event of a breach of their duty to supervise their wrestlers, and particularly in the context of media coverage of violence scandals, the penalty regularly imposed on a toshiyori is a reduction in salary and a two-rank demotion in the hierarchy. In the event of serious misconduct, toshiyori may also lose their right to manage their stable.

The third most important punishment for a master, demotion was used for the first time on a former yokozuna against former Wajima (then known as Hanakago) after he had put up his share in the Association as collateral on a loan. Thirty-three years later, Takanohana was also demoted after the Takayoshitoshi scandal.

== Tasks and occupations ==
Association members who have secured ownership of a share are involved in the management of the association's various departments until their compulsory retirement at the age of 65.

=== Coaching and operating stables ===
Only retired wrestlers can open stables. In sumo, where it is important to attract as many high-potential wrestlers as possible to the stable, the presence of elders who were once popular wrestlers is an important factor in the perpetuation of the sport. The elders who own stables are often the busiest, as they are responsible for maintaining their scouting network and training all the wrestlers who depend on them. Although all elders are able to found or manage their own stables, only about half of them actually exercise this entitlement. This is partly due to the additional requirements the Sumo Association imposes for opening stables. Toshiyori who wish to found a new stable must have a career that has either taken them to the ranks of yokozuna or ōzeki, have them held a san'yaku rank for at least twenty-five tournaments, or have been a maegashira for sixty tournaments. If a stablemaster leaves, a coach at his stable can take over without founding a new stable provided he has competed in at least twelve tournaments in the makuuchi division or twenty tournaments in the jūryō division or higher.

In daily life, the wrestlers join in the training by order of rank and the stablemaster only appears once the sandanme wrestlers have joined. It is often up to the shishō to supervise his heya's training, although if he is absent, another oyakata takes his place. After their final retirement at the age of 65, many elders remain informally attached to their former stables, where they provide advice to active wrestlers in addition to the master who has inherited their share. Because of the deep respect for the toshiyori's status, even after their final retirement, it is common to see retired masters treated with a high degree of respect by all stable personnel. Although a heya's internal hierarchy stipulates that the shishō is the highest authority in the stable, the shishō is not necessarily paid more than the other toshiyori attached to the stable, as each elder has his own internal promotion within the Sumo Association, regardless of how the heya operates. The shishō will, however, receive bonuses from the Sumo Association, linked to the material organization of the stable in his charge.

Elders are not distributed evenly between stables. This distribution creates quite wide discrepancies in the quality of training within the stables, with some, like Musashigawa stable having only the stablemaster for fourteen wrestlers, and others, like Kasugano stable, having seven masters for almost the same number of wrestlers.

=== Running the association ===
Management of the association is organized solely around the elders. Officially, toshiyori are recognized as trustees in the association's statutes. This organization is a particularity of professional sumo, whereas in other sports, the management of organizing bodies is more often entrusted to sports foreigners, chosen by the owners from among lawyers or businessmen. The specificity of the toshiyori's monopoly on running the association lies in the fact that their learning of wrestling codes and their fraternal relationships enable the association to maximize group welfare. The reason why a permanent management system operated by outside personalities has not been implemented, despite the fact that the toshiyori (gathered in a board of trustees) technically possess the capacity to impose this change, is that the management of the association is above all based on the relationships of trust between these leaders. The latter having been built up during their wrestling careers, and for most of them since their teens, it became apparent that requiring the services of foreign personalities would involve training in the codes of the sport and in special relationships of trust, which would take too much time compared to self-management.

Elders are divided into a board of trustees overseeing the actions of a board of directors, itself made up exclusively of elders. Elders who own stables are often expected to be the most involved in the Sumo Association's organization.

The Sumo Association is made up of several departments that oversee all the association's activities and are staffed by elders elected to these positions.

It is also customary for all new elders, even former yokozuna, to be assigned as security guards for the hanamichi in their first tournament after retirement. In the latter case, the young retirees are recognizable by their dark blue uniform jackets bearing the Sumo Association crest. Other tasks entrusted to committee members include manning the ticket booths at the entrance to the Ryōgoku Kokugikan.

Depending on their distribution, elders are also responsible for sweeping or distributing by-products. The elders distributed within the Public Relations Department are also responsible for hosting the toshiyori's own YouTube channel Oyakata-chan (親方ちゃんねるな).

=== Supervising the matches ===
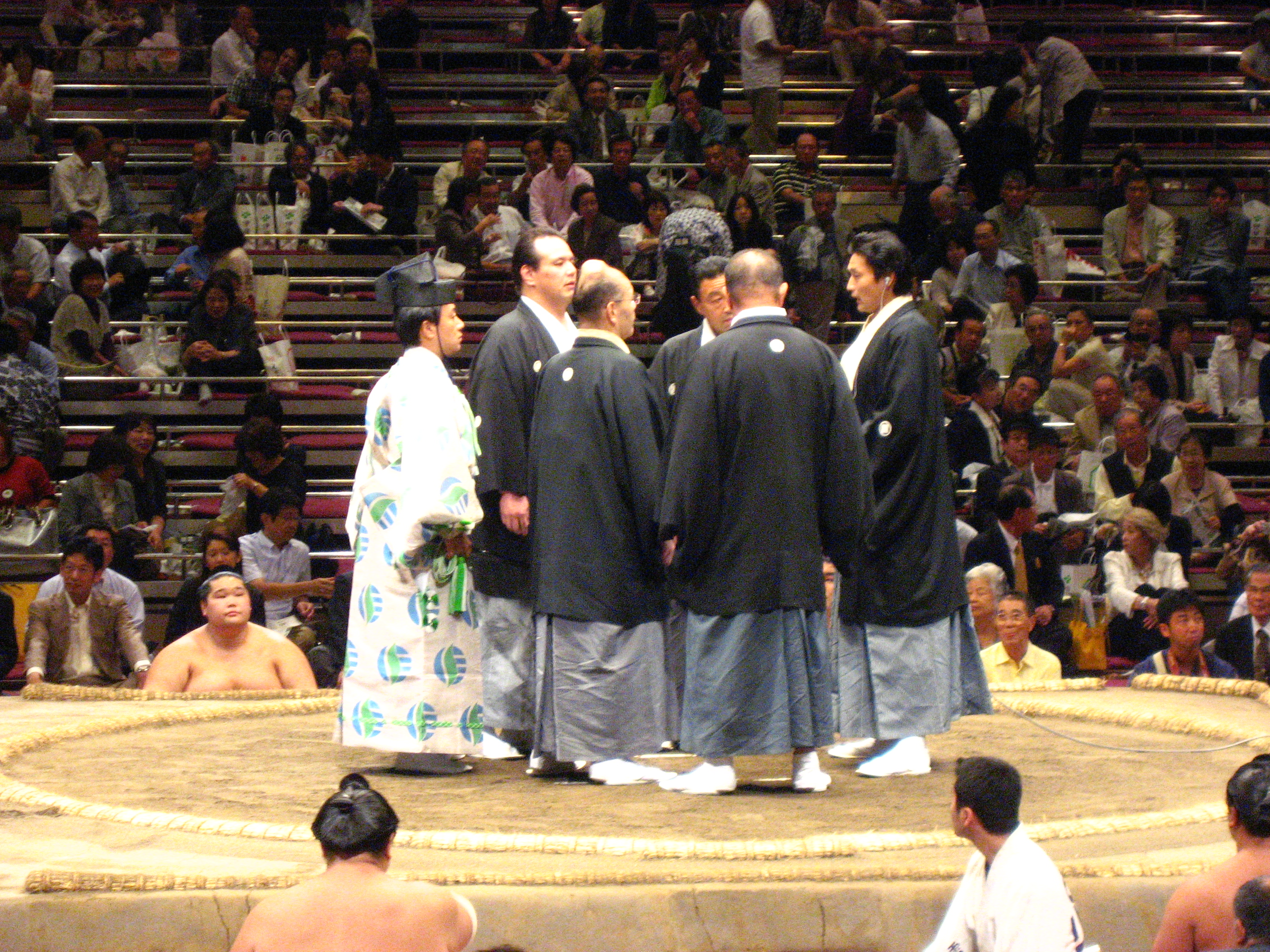
Some toshiyori serve as ring-side judges during matches; seen here debating a call by the gyōji.

The elders' judging function developed around 1750, with the emergence of interests linked to the prestige of local lords. The latter, by sponsoring wrestlers, increasingly questioned the refereeing of matches involving their wrestlers, to the detriment of the gyōji's decisions. To avoid tensions, elders were placed in the corners of the ring to discuss the results of matches.

Like any other senior manager in the Sumo Association, the elders responsible for judging matches have a two-year term. The number of judges is set at twenty, and places are distributed equitably among the various ichimon, or clans, of stables within the association. Among the five judges seated around the ring, one serves as group leader and another as timekeeper. The latter is responsible for keeping the pre-bout rituals on schedule, discreetly announcing to the gyōji (referee) that the time is up. In the event of a disputed result, it is the shimpan who can challenge the gyōji's decision by calling in a mono-ii (物言い; lit. 'talk about things'). When doing so, they correspond through an earpiece to a further two judges in a video review room. Judges can confirm the decision of the gyōji by announcing gunbai-dōri (軍配通り; lit. 'way of the gunbai'), overturn it by announcing gunbai-sashichigae (軍配差し違え; lit. 'gunbai mistake'), or order a torinaoshi (取り直し; rematch).

== See also ==
- Glossary of sumo terms
- Japan Sumo Association
- Sumo stable
- List of sumo elders
- List of past sumo wrestlers
- List of sumo stables
- Coach (sport)
- Japanese honorifics
- Senpai and kōhai
- Sensei
