= Hasegawa Katsutoshi =

Japanese sumo wrestler (1944–2026)

Personal information
- Native name: 長谷川 勝敏
- Born: Katsutoshi Hasegawa; 20 July 1944 Hokkaidō, Japan
- Died: 31 May 2026 (aged 81)
- Height: 1.84 m (6 ft 1/2 in)
- Weight: 127 kg (280 lb)

Sport
- Sport: Sumo
- Retired: May 1976
- Heya: Sadogatake
- Record: 678-577-15
- Debut: March 1960
- Highest rank: Sekiwake (January 1969)
- Elder name: Hidenoyama
- Championships: 1 (Makuuchi); 1 (Jūryō); 1 (Makushita)
- Special Prizes: Outstanding Performance (3); Fighting Spirit (3); Technique(2)
- Gold Stars: 9 Sadanoyama (2); Tochinoumi (2); Kashiwado (2); Kitanofuji (2); Wajima
- Updated on June 2020

Hasegawa Katsutoshi (20 July 1944 – 31 May 2026) was a Japanese sumo wrestler from Kurisawa, Hokkaido (now a part of Iwamizawa city). He began his professional career in 1960 and reached the top division in 1965. Hasegawa won eight special prizes for his achievements in tournaments and earned nine gold stars for defeating yokozuna. He won a tournament championship or yūshō in 1972 and was a runner-up in two other tournaments. His highest rank was sekiwake. Hasegawa retired in 1976 and became an elder of the Japan Sumo Association, working as a coach at Sadogatake stable until his retirement in 2009.

== Career ==
Hasegawa Katsutoshi joined professional sumo in March 1960 at the age of 15, recruited by the former sekiwake Kotonishiki. Unusually, he fought under his own surname for his entire career (he is the only top division wrestler from Sadogatake stable not to have adopted a shikona or fighting name with the prefix "Koto"). He made the jūryō division in January 1963 and was promoted to the top makuuchi division two years later in January 1965.

He quickly rose up the ranks, defeating his first yokozuna (Tochinoumi) in September 1965 and earning his first special prize, for Technique. In the following tournament in November he made his debut in the titled san'yaku ranks at komusubi. He was runner-up to yokozuna Taihō in the May 1967 tournament. He reached sekiwake for the first time in January 1969 and held the rank for eight straight tournaments.

Hasegawa won the top division yūshō or tournament championship at sekiwake rank in March 1972, defeating Kaiketsu in a playoff. However, the Sumo Association decided not to promote him, as there were already four ōzeki at that time, who were generally felt to be performing at a mediocre level. Managing only eight wins in the following tournament in May, he never became an ōzeki. He was a sekiwake for 21 tournaments, a record for the modern era which stood until 2007 when it was broken by Kotomitsuki. His last appearance at sekiwake was in January 1974. After this tournament he changed the second part of his shikona from Katsutoshi to Katsuhiro but it did not bring a change of luck and he remained largely in the maegashira ranks.

== Retirement and death ==
Hasegawa retired in May 1976, but remained in the sumo world as an elder, with the name Hidenoyama Oyakata. Until 2008 he was a Director of the Japan Sumo Association, responsible for the running of the annual honbasho held in Nagoya. He then worked at Special Executive level. Unusually for a senior member of the Association, he did not take charge of a stable, instead working as a coach at Sadogatake stable, firstly under former yokozuna Kotozakura, and from 2005 under former sekiwake Kotonowaka. He reached the mandatory retirement age of 65 in July 2009.

On 8 June 2026, the Japan Sumo Association announced that he had died from pancreatic cancer on 31 May, at the age of 81.

== Fighting style ==
Hasegawa's favoured techniques were hidari-yotsu (a right hand outside, left hand inside grip on the opponent's mawashi), sukuinage (scoop throw), and yorikiri (force out).

== Career record ==
Hasegawa Katsuhiro
Year	January Hatsu basho, Tokyo	March Haru basho, Osaka	May Natsu basho, Tokyo	July Nagoya basho, Nagoya	September Aki basho, Tokyo	November Kyūshū basho, Fukuoka
1960	x	(Maezumo)	West Jonokuchi #11; 7–1	West Jonidan #74; 6–1	West Jonidan #13; 5–2	West Sandanme #79; 6–1
1961	East Sandanme #39; 6–1	West Makushita #83; 6–1	East Makushita #45; 3–4	East Makushita #53; 4–3	East Makushita #49; 4–3	East Makushita #45; 6–1
1962	East Makushita #22; 4–3	West Makushita #19; 4–3	East Makushita #16; 5–2	East Makushita #7; 4–3	West Makushita #3; 4–3	East Makushita #2; 5–2
1963	East Jūryō #17; 9–6	West Jūryō #11; Sat out due to injury 0–0–15	West Makushita #6; 1–6	West Makushita #22; 5–2	East Makushita #16; 4–3	West Makushita #15; 4–3
1964	West Makushita #12; 5–2	East Makushita #4; 7–0–P; Champion	East Jūryō #13; 9–6	East Jūryō #10; 13–2; Champion	West Jūryō #3; 11–4	East Jūryō #1; 8–7
1965	East Maegashira #15; 8–7	East Maegashira #13; 8–7	East Maegashira #8; 10–5	East Maegashira #3; 8–7	East Maegashira #2; 10–5; T★	East Komusubi #1; 7–8
1966	West Maegashira #1; 5–10 ★	West Maegashira #5; 9–6	East Maegashira #2; 9–6	West Komusubi #1; 9–6	East Komusubi #1; 6–9	West Maegashira #2; 4–11 ★
1967	West Maegashira #7; 10–5	West Maegashira #1; 4–11	West Maegashira #7; 13–2; F	East Komusubi #1; 9–6; O	East Komusubi #1; 6–9	East Maegashira #1; 9–6
1968	East Komusubi #1; 5–10	West Maegashira #4; 8–7 ★★	East Maegashira #2; 8–7 ★	West Maegashira #1; 7–8	West Maegashira #2; 9–6	East Maegashira #1; 9–6
1969	West Sekiwake #1; 9–6	East Sekiwake #1; 9–6	East Sekiwake #1; 9–6	East Sekiwake #1; 11–4	East Sekiwake #1; 8–7	West Sekiwake #1; 8–7
1970	West Sekiwake #1; 8–7	East Sekiwake #2; 6–9	East Maegashira #2; 5–10	East Maegashira #5; 10–5	East Komusubi #1; 5–10	West Maegashira #2; 8–7; O★
1971	West Sekiwake #1; 3–12	West Maegashira #2; 8–7	West Sekiwake #1; 9–6	East Sekiwake #1; 8–7	East Sekiwake #1; 8–7; O	West Sekiwake #1; 8–7
1972	East Sekiwake #2; 10–5	East Sekiwake #1; 12–3–P; F	East Sekiwake #1; 8–7	East Sekiwake #3; 5–10	West Maegashira #1; 11–4	East Sekiwake #1; 8–7
1973	East Sekiwake #1; 4–11	East Maegashira #4; 7–8	East Maegashira #5; 8–7	West Maegashira #1; 6–9	East Maegashira #2; 9–6 ★	West Sekiwake #1; 8–7
1974	West Sekiwake #1; 5–10	East Maegashira #2; 10–5; F★	West Komusubi #1; 4–11	East Maegashira #5; 10–5; T	East Komusubi #2; 6–9	West Maegashira #3; 6–9
1975	West Maegashira #5; 9–6	West Maegashira #1; 6–9	West Maegashira #3; 6–9	West Maegashira #6; 8–7	East Maegashira #3; 4–11	West Maegashira #9; 10–5
1976	East Maegashira #3; 7–8	East Maegashira #4; 6–9	East Maegashira #8; Retired; 0–5	x	x	x
Record given as wins–losses–absences Top division champion Top division runner-up Retired Lower divisions Non-participation Sanshō key: F=Fighting spirit; O=Outstanding performance; T=Technique Also shown: ★=Kinboshi; P=Playoff(s); Divisions: Makuuchi — Jūryō — Makushita — Sandanme — Jonidan — Jonokuchi Makuuchi ranks: Yokozuna — Ōzeki — Sekiwake — Komusubi — Maegashira

== See also ==
- List of sumo record holders
- List of sumo tournament top division champions
- List of sumo tournament top division runners-up
- List of sumo tournament second division champions
- Glossary of sumo terms
- List of past sumo wrestlers
- List of sekiwake
