= Terumasa =

- Gender: Male

Origin
- Origin: Japanese
- Meaning: Different meanings depending on the kanji used

Terumasa (written: 輝政, 皓正 or 晴將) is a masculine Japanese given name. Notable people with the name include:

- Terumasa Hino (日野 皓正) (born 1942), Japanese jazz trumpeter
- Ikeda Terumasa (池田 輝政) (1565–1613), Japanese daimyō
- Kotonowaka Terumasa (琴ノ若 晴將) (born 1968), Japanese sumo wrestler
