= Hidenoyama stable =

Stable of sumo wrestlers

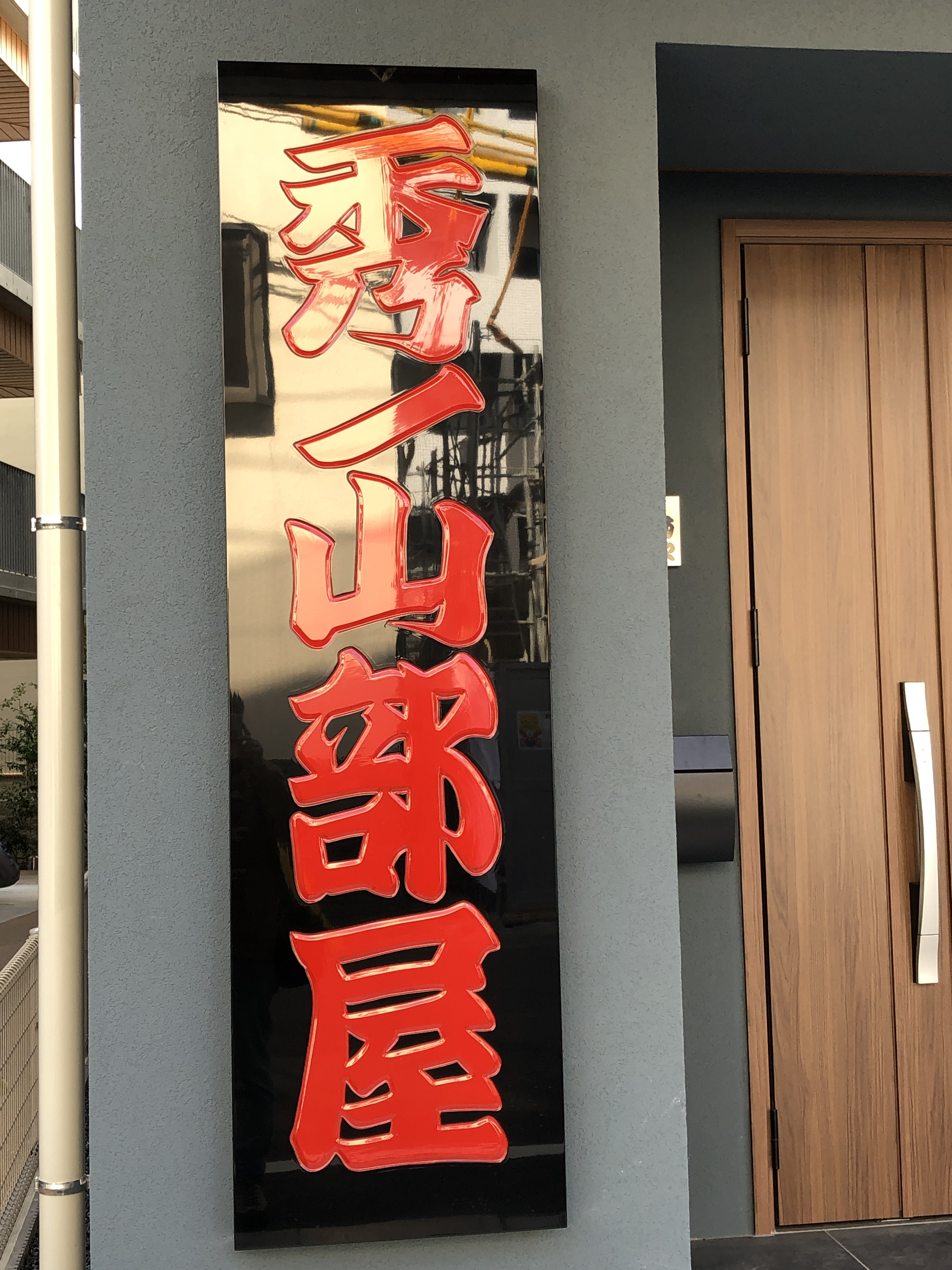

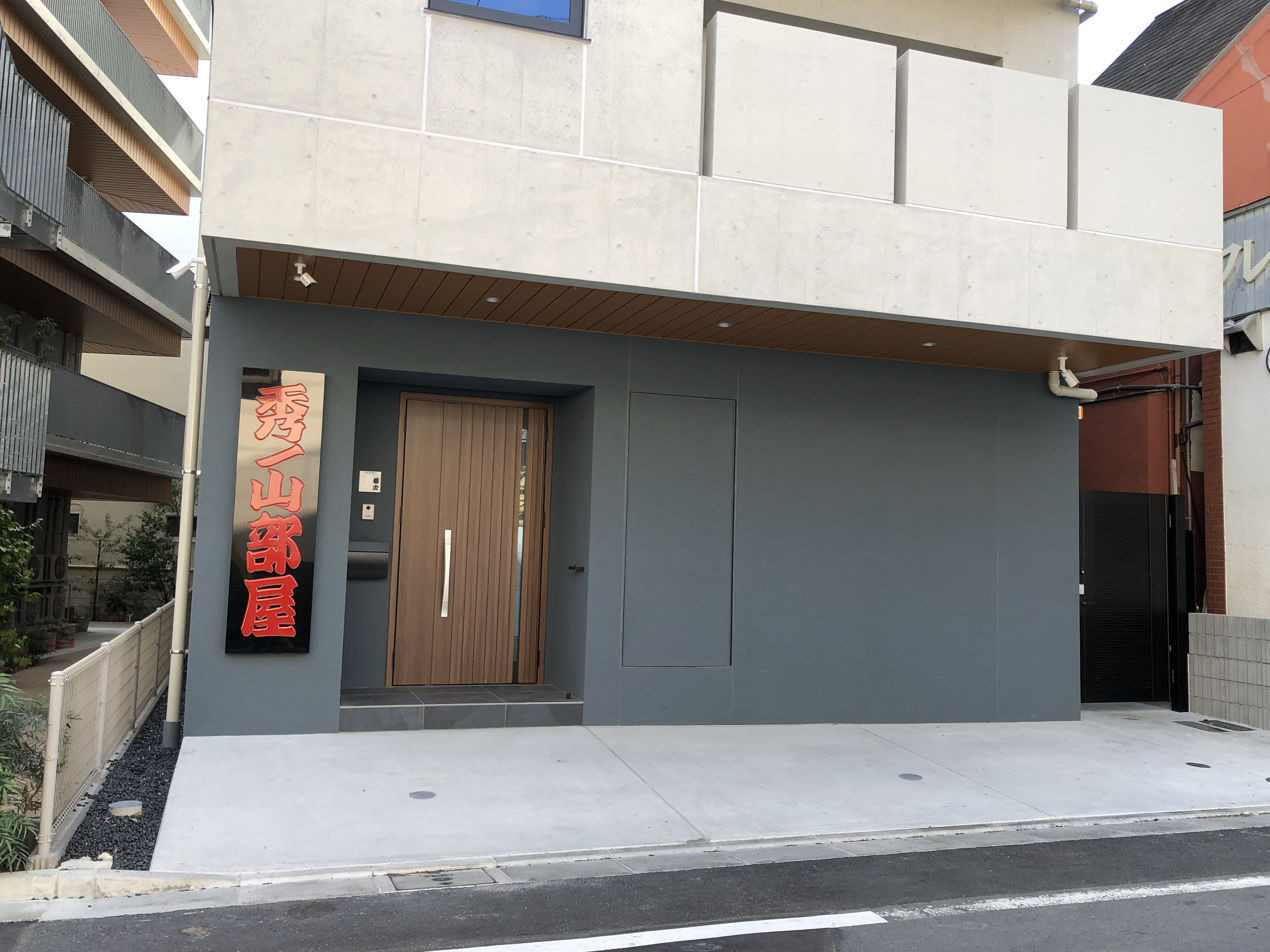

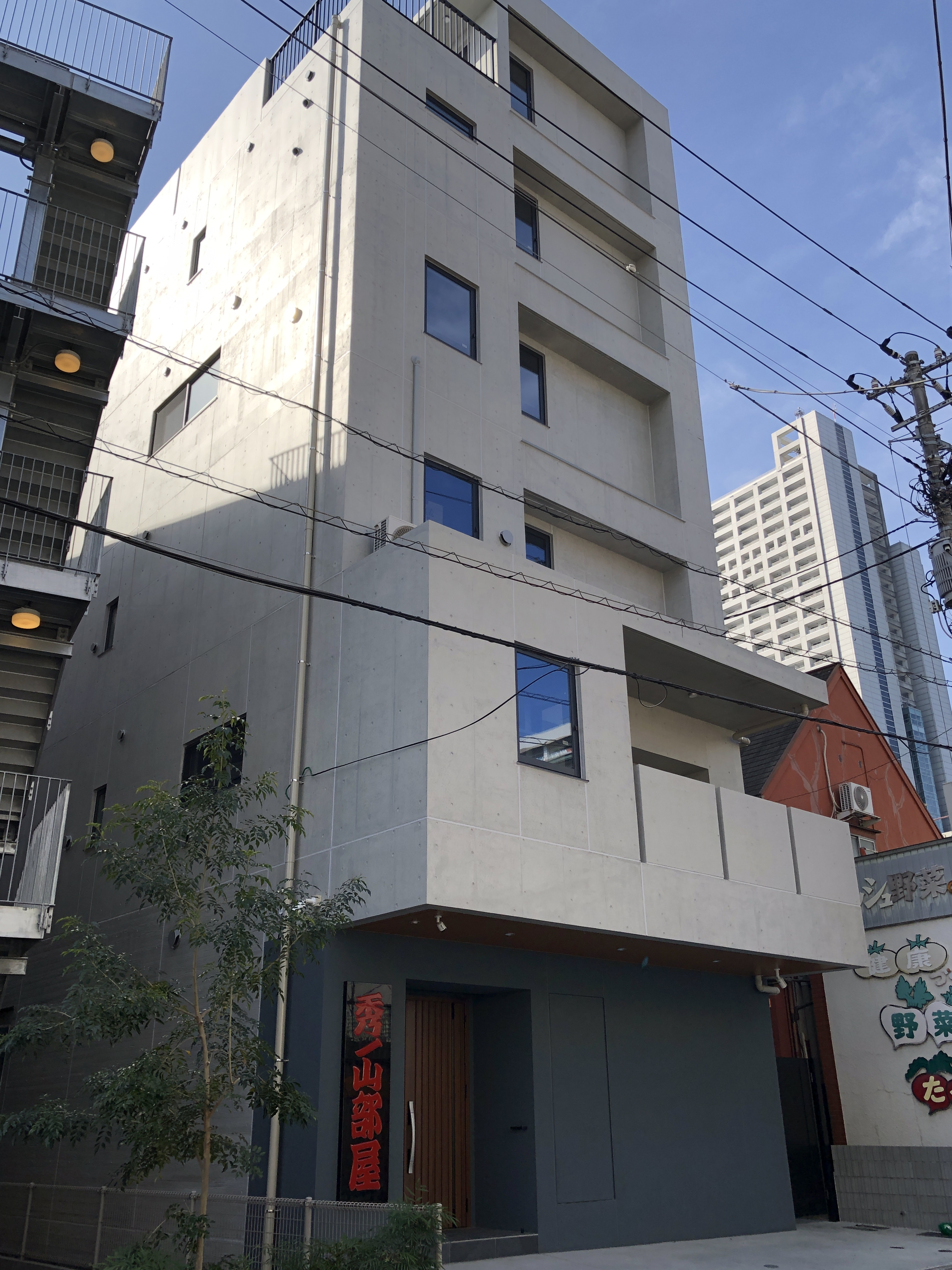

Hidenoyama stable (秀ノ山部屋, Hidenoyama-beya) is a stable of sumo wrestlers, part of the Nishonoseki ichimon, or group of stables. It was formed by former ōzeki Kotoshōgiku in October 2024 after he became independent from Sadogatake stable.

As of May 2026, the stable has 8 active wrestlers.

== History ==
Following Kotoshōgiku's retirement in November 2020, the latter inherited the Hidenoyama (秀ノ山) elder stock and became a coach at Sadogatake stable. In May 2023, Kotoshōgiku announced that he was planning to open his own stable in 2024, and in September 2024 it was confirmed at a meeting of the Japan Sumo Association's board of directors that Kotoshōgiku would be authorized to create Hidenoyama stable as of 19 October of the same year. Early on in the process of creating the new stable, it was announced that four of Sadogatake's youngest wrestlers, all ranked in the jonidan division, would be joining the new establishment, motivated by the links created with Hidenoyama, then in charge of training young recruits at Sadogatake stable. At the time of its foundation, the stable re-established a stable named Hidenoyama for the first time in 110 years.

Located in Higashimukōjima, Sumida, the new stable had a groundbreaking ceremony in November 2023 and was completed in November 2024. Its official inauguration took place in April 2025, in the presence of the two directors of the Nishonoseki ichimon at the time (Takadagawa and Sadogatake). The building has five floors, the first of which serves as the training ground and the second as the dining and bathroom facilities. The third as the dormitories and private rooms for the sekitori, and the fourth as a gym and office. The fifth floor houses the private apartments of the master and his family. The stable's training ring was designed to be seen from the adjacent nursing home. Its sign is made of cypress and was created using a wajima-nuri lacquer method with a bright red color to ward off evil spirits. The sign was originally assembled in Wajima, Ishikawa and was saved in the craftsman's workshop after the 2024 Noto earthquake.

In order to build up his wrestlers' strength, Hidenoyama announced as soon as his stable was founded that he would hire a cook to prepare the meals, so that his wrestlers wouldn't have to leave training early to prepare the food. The training regime has also been adapted to limit exhaustion. In addition, the stable has hired two personal coaches, both former rikishi, to accompany the stablemaster's coaching and educate recruits in professional sumo etiquette.

In preparation for the final tournament of 2024, the first for the now-independent former Sadogatake stable wrestlers, Hidenoyama announced his intention to build his touring camp in his hometown of Yanagawa, Fukuoka.

The stable has launched its own YouTube channel with the aim of opening up to a wider audience and reassuring the apprentices' parents.

== Owners ==
- Hidenoyama Kazuhiro (iin, ōzeki Kotoshōgiku, born 1984)

== Notable active wrestlers ==
- None

== Location and access ==
4-2-10 Higashimukōjima, Sumida, Tokyo
10 minute walk from Higashi-Mukōjima Station (Tobu Skytree Line)

== See also ==
- List of sumo stables
- List of active sumo wrestlers
- List of past sumo wrestlers
- Glossary of sumo terms
