= Kotozakura Masakatsu I =

Japanese sumo wrestler

Kotozakura Masakatsu
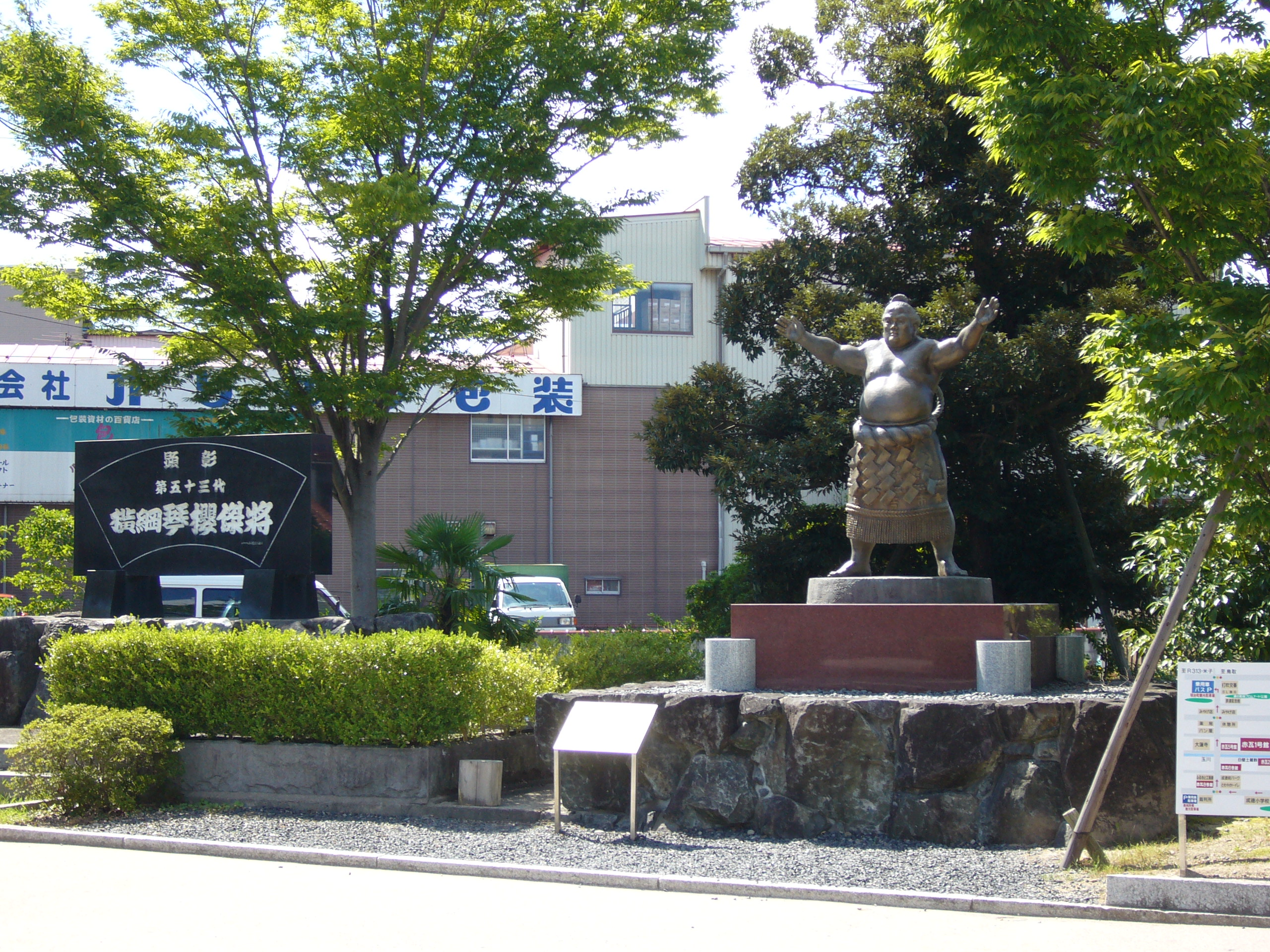
- Bronze statue of Kotozakura Masakatsu in Kurayoshi, Tottori.

Personal information
- Native name: 琴櫻 傑將
- Born: Kamatani Norio; November 26, 1940 Kurayoshi, Japan
- Died: August 14, 2007 (aged 66)
- Height: 1.82 m (5 ft 11 1/2 in)
- Weight: 150 kg (331 lb)

Sport
- Sport: Sumo
- Retired: July 1974
- Heya: Sadogatake
- Record: 723-428-77
- Debut: January 1959
- Highest rank: Yokozuna (March 1973)
- Elder name: Sadogatake
- Championships: 5 (Makuuchi); 2 (Jūryō)
- Special Prizes: Outstanding Performance (4); Fighting Spirit (2)
- Gold Stars: 2 (Kashiwado, Sadanoyama)
- Updated on June 2020

Kotozakura Masakatsu (Japanese: 琴櫻 傑將; November 26, 1940 – August 14, 2007) was a Japanese professional sumo wrestler from Kurayoshi, Tottori. He was the sport's 53rd yokozuna. He made his professional debut in 1959, reaching the top division in 1963. After several years at the second highest rank of ōzeki, in 1973 he was promoted to yokozuna at the age of thirty-two years two months, becoming the oldest wrestler to be promoted to yokozuna since 1958, when the current six tournaments system was established. After his retirement he was head coach of Sadogatake stable and produced a string of top division wrestlers.

== Career ==
Born Kamatani Norio (鎌谷 紀雄), he came from a sumo background, as his father was involved in organising regional amateur sumo tournaments and his grandfather's brother had been a professional rikishi. The young Kamatani at first competed in judo, achieving shodan level while still in middle school. However, after doing well in a national high school sumo competition he decided on a career in professional sumo. Initially his parents wanted him to continue with judo but they were persuaded by former komusubi Kotonishiki Noboru to let him join Sadogatake stable.

Kotozakura made his professional debut in January 1959. He reached the jūryō division in July 1962 and the top makuuchi division in March 1963. After making his san'yaku debut at komusubi in January 1964 he suffered an injury and returned to jūryō, but he quickly recovered. After an 11–4 record at sekiwake in September 1967 he was awarded the Outstanding Performance prize and promotion to ōzeki. He won two tournament championships in July 1968 and March 1969, but by the early 1970s he had begun to be regarded as something of a "perpetual ōzeki", often struggling with injuries and finding it difficult to come up with the necessary wins to maintain his rank. He was kadoban, or in danger of demotion from ōzeki, three times during this period. Remarkably however, he won consecutive championships in November 1972 and January 1973 to earn promotion to yokozuna at the age of thirty two, after thirty two tournaments at ōzeki. In July 1973 he defeated Kitanofuji in a playoff to win his only championship as a yokozuna. After injuring his knee in 1974 he withdrew from several tournaments and announced his retirement that July.

He made an appearance in the 1967 James Bond film You Only Live Twice, seen fighting Fujinishiki.

== After retirement ==
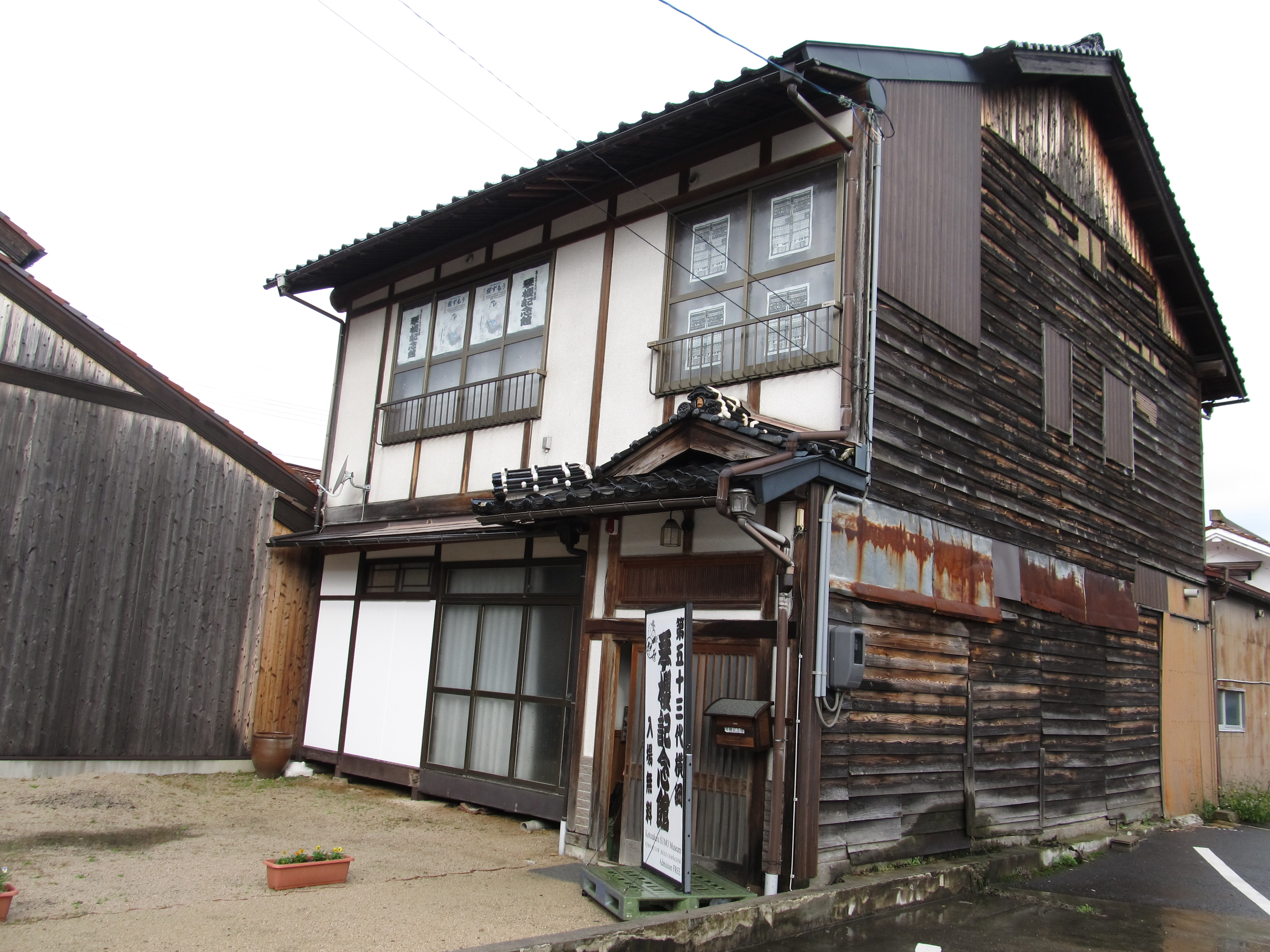
The 53rd Yokozuna Kotozakura Memorial Museum in his hometown of Kurayoshi

Kotozakura had been expecting to open up his own training stable, but when his stablemaster died suddenly just days after Kotozakura's retirement, he took over Sadogatake stable instead. He produced many top division wrestlers over the years, such as ōzeki Kotokaze, Kotoōshū, Kotomitsuki and Kotoshōgiku and sekiwake Kotogaume, Kotofuji, Kotonishiki, and Kotonowaka. When yokozuna Asashōryū was criticized for his behaviour in 2003, Kotozakura defended the Mongolian by pointing out the lack of emotional strength in young Japanese sumo wrestlers at the time. After 31 years as head coach, he passed on ownership of the stable upon reaching the mandatory retirement age of sixty five in November 2005 to Kotonowaka, who had become his son-in-law. Shortly after attending the ōzeki promotion ceremony of Kotomitsuki, Kotozakura died on August 14, 2007. He had battled diabetes for several years and had also suffered the trauma of a leg amputation.

== Fighting style ==
Kotozakura was known for his bull-like rushing style of sumo, earning him the nickname "Mō Gyū" (猛牛; lit. 'Wild Bull'). His favoured techniques were the two most common kimarite in sumo – yorikiri (force out) and oshidashi (push out). When grabbing his opponent's mawashi he preferred a migi-yotsu, or left hand outside, right hand inside grip.

== Career record ==
Kotozakura Masakatsu
Year	January Hatsu basho, Tokyo	March Haru basho, Osaka	May Natsu basho, Tokyo	July Nagoya basho, Nagoya	September Aki basho, Tokyo	November Kyūshū basho, Fukuoka
1959	(Maezumō)	East Jonokuchi #20; 7–1	East Jonidan #93; 6–2	East Jonidan #55; 6–2	West Jonidan #21; 6–2	West Sandanme #85; 6–2
1960	East Sandanme #52; 7–1–PP; Champion	East Sandanme #17; 4–4	East Sandanme #17; 3–5	East Sandanme #29; 6–1	East Makushita #84; 5–2	West Makushita #68; 6–1
1961	West Makushita #46; 5–2	West Makushita #33; 4–3	East Makushita #24; 4–3	West Makushita #20; 3–4	East Makushita #25; 2–5	East Makushita #37; 7–0–P
1962	East Makushita #7; 3–4	East Makushita #9; 5–2	East Makushita #2; 6–1	East Jūryō #16; 11–4–PP; Champion	West Jūryō #7; 7–8	West Jūryō #8; 8–7
1963	West Jūryō #4; 13–2; Champion	East Maegashira #13; 6–9	East Jūryō #2; 11–4	East Maegashira #15; 9–6	West Maegashira #9; 12–3; F	East Maegashira #1; 8–7; O
1964	West Komusubi #1; 3–4–8	East Maegashira #5; Sat out due to injury 0–0–15	East Maegashira #15; 5–10	West Jūryō #2; 9–6	East Jūryō #1; 10–5	East Maegashira #12; 10–5
1965	West Maegashira #4; 10–5	West Komusubi #1; 8–7	West Sekiwake #1; 8–7	East Sekiwake #1; 6–9	East Maegashira #1; 9–6; O★★	West Komusubi #1; 10–5
1966	East Komusubi #1; 8–7	East Komusubi #1; 5–10	East Maegashira #3; 10–5	East Komusubi #1; 9–6	West Sekiwake #1; 7–8	West Komusubi #1; 10–5; O
1967	East Sekiwake #1; 8–7	East Sekiwake #1; 7–8	East Komusubi #1; 10–5	West Sekiwake #1; 11–4; F	East Sekiwake #1; 11–4; O	East Ōzeki #2; 8–7
1968	West Ōzeki #2; 10–5	East Ōzeki #2; 10–5	East Ōzeki #2; 9–6	West Ōzeki #2; 13–2	East Ōzeki #1; 6–5–4	East Ōzeki #2; 10–5
1969	East Ōzeki #2; 5–10	East Ōzeki #2; 13–2	East Ōzeki #1; 8–7	East Ōzeki #2; 11–4	West Ōzeki #1; 10–5	East Ōzeki #2; 9–6
1970	East Ōzeki #2; 9–6	West Ōzeki #1; 10–5	East Ōzeki #1; 9–6	West Ōzeki #1; 11–4	West Ōzeki #1; 8–7	East Ōzeki #2; 9–6
1971	East Ōzeki #2; 9–6	West Ōzeki #1; 11–4	East Ōzeki #1; 2–4–9	West Ōzeki #2; 9–6	East Ōzeki #2; 10–5	West Ōzeki #1; 2–4–9
1972	West Ōzeki #2; 10–5	East Ōzeki #1; 10–5	East Ōzeki #1; 1–2–12	West Ōzeki #2; 8–7	West Ōzeki #1; 9–6	West Ōzeki #2; 14–1
1973	East Ōzeki #1; 14–1	East Yokozuna #1; 11–4	West Yokozuna #1; 10–5	West Yokozuna #1; 14–1–P	East Yokozuna #1; 9–6	West Yokozuna #1; 11–4
1974	West Yokozuna #1; 3–3–9	West Yokozuna #1; 8–7	West Yokozuna #1; 0–4–11	West Yokozuna #1; Retired –	x	x
Record given as wins–losses–absences Top division champion Top division runner-up Retired Non-participation Jūryō Lower divisions Sanshō key: F=Fighting spirit; O=Outstanding performance; T=Technique Also shown: ★=Kinboshi; P=Playoff(s); Divisions: Makuuchi — Jūryō — Makushita — Sandanme — Jonidan — Jonokuchi Makuuchi ranks: Yokozuna — Ōzeki — Sekiwake — Komusubi — Maegashira

== See also ==
- Glossary of sumo terms
- List of past sumo wrestlers
- List of sumo tournament top division champions
- List of sumo tournament top division runners-up
- List of sumo tournament second division champions
- List of yokozuna

Preceded by Kitanofuji Katsuaki	53rd Yokozuna; 1973–1974	Succeeded by Hiroshi Wajima
Yokozuna is not a successive rank, and more than one wrestler can hold the title at once
