= Sadogatake stable =

Stable of sumo wrestlers

Coordinates: 35.7772°N 139.9616°E

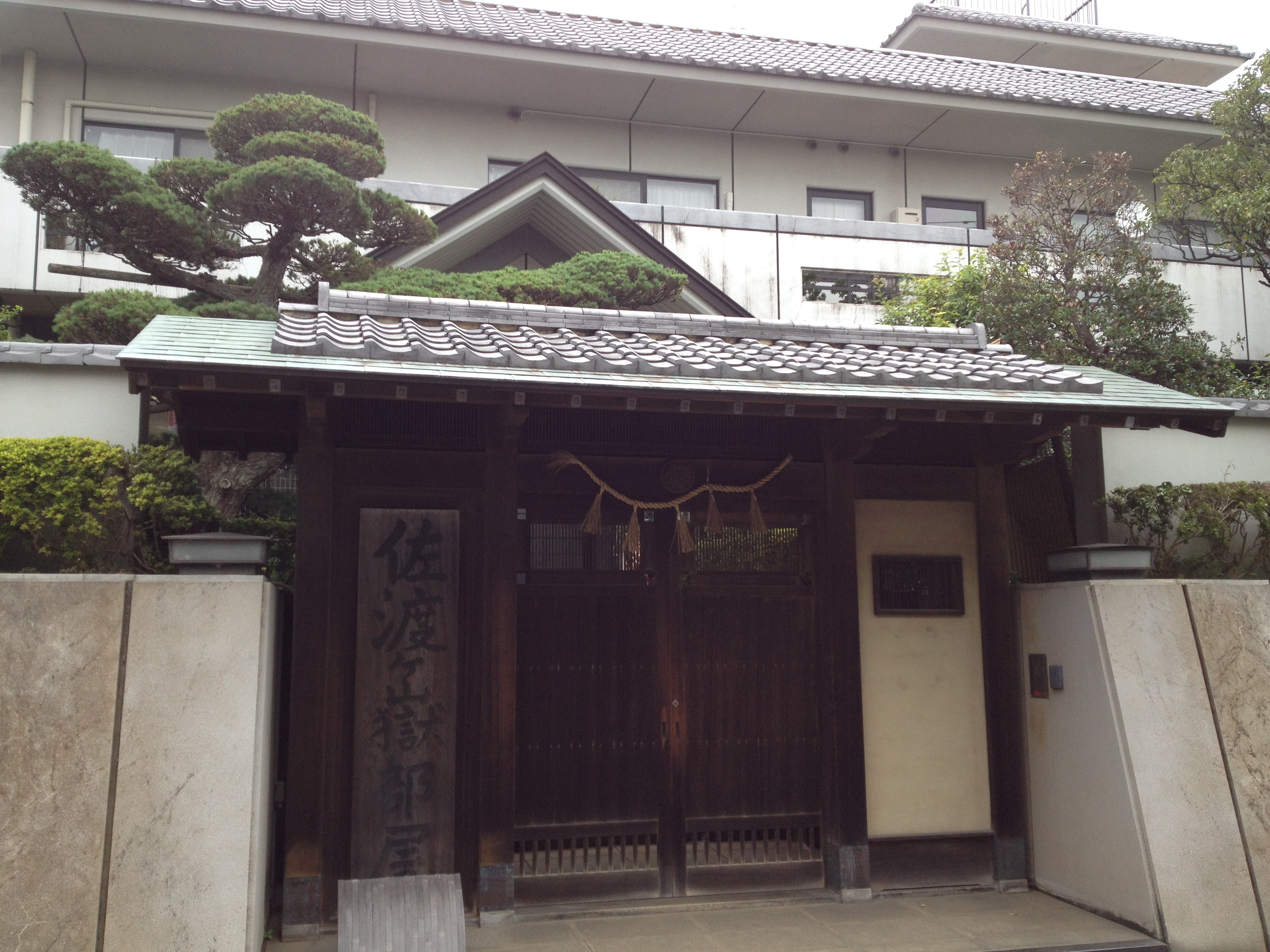

Sadogatake stable (佐渡ヶ嶽部屋, Sadogatake-beya) is a stable of sumo wrestlers belonging to the Nishonoseki group of stables. In its modern form, it dates from September 1955, when it was set up by former komusubi Kotonishiki Noboru. Former yokozuna Kotozakura took over the running of the stable in 1974 following Kotonishiki's death. The stable is located in Matsudo, Chiba prefecture. Over the next thirty years the stable produced a string of top division wrestlers. Kotozakura stood down in November 2005, handing the stable over to his son-in-law, sekiwake Kotonowaka.

A successful stable, Sadogatake is currently the active stable with the longest continuous presence (59 years) of at least one of its wrestlers in the makuuchi division. Between September 2007 and July 2010, it became the first stable since Musashigawa stable in 2001 to have two wrestlers ranked at ōzeki simultaneously, with Kotomitsuki and Kotoōshū. It happened again between November 2011 and November 2013 with Kotoōshū and Kotoshōgiku. In March 2020 Sadogatake's son, who has taken the name Kotozakura after his grandfather, reached the top makuuchi division. On the May 2020 banzuke all five sekitori were ranked in the top division, although none were above maegashira 13. The most the stable has ever had in makuuchi simultaneously is seven, in November 1992 and January 1993.

In April 2024, the stable recruited Kōsei Motomura, a former Hakuhō Cup participant and the first wrestler since the end of the Second World War to measure less than 1.60 m (5 ft 3 in) since the abolition of the weight and height minimums system. In October of the same year, Hidenoyama (ōzeki Kotoshōgiku) broke off from Sadogatake to found his own stable.

As of May 2026, the stable has 17 active wrestlers.

== Controversy ==
In January 2021, junior wrestler Kotokantetsu retired and publicly criticized Sadogatake for not supporting him during his sumo career and not allowing him to sit out that month's honbasho despite his fears of contracting COVID-19 after undergoing cardiac surgery. The former Kotokantetsu, whose real name is Daisuke Yanagihara, subsequently filed a lawsuit against the Japan Sumo Association and Sadogatake in March 2023 for ¥4.1 million in monetary damages over claims of being forced to retire from professional sumo and for violations of his human rights, while also alleging that lower division wrestlers in the stable were mistreated. In a statement to the Foreign Correspondents' Club of Japan in July 2023, Yanagihara said that he wanted to reveal the actual state of the sumo world "which has been shrouded in mystery in the name of traditional culture," adding his concern that the Japanese media was not accurately covering the issue and that there was a possibility it could be covered up. He alleged that in 2011 he was repeatedly slapped by a senior wrestler with traditional footwear that contained metal. He also told reporters that lower-division wrestlers at the stable were often forced to eat rotten meat during their training. Yanagihara showed reporters a picture he took in July 2017 and sent to his mother using the communications app Line of a package of rib roast allegedly served at the stable that had been expired for 5 1/2 years. When asked by Agence France-Presse about the lawsuit in July 2023, the Sumo Association declined to comment.

== Ring name conventions ==
Wrestlers at this stable take ring names or shikona that begin with the character 琴 (read: koto), in deference to the founder, Kotonishiki, and the owners who followed him.

== Owners ==
- 2005–present: 13th Sadogatake (riji, sekiwake Kotonowaka, born 1968)
- 1974–2005: 12th Sadogatake (the 53rd yokozuna, Kotozakura, 1940–2007)
- 1955–1974: 11th Sadogatake (komusubi Kotonishiki, 1922–1974)

== Coaches ==
- Kumegawa Yoshikiro (iin, komusubi Kotoinazuma, born 1962)
- Hamakaze Hideaki (fuku-riji, maegashira Gojōrō, born 1973)
- Shiratama Katsuyuki (san'yo, maegashira Kototsubaki, born 1960)
- Araiso Yuki (shunin, sekiwake Kotoyuki, born 1991)
- Oguruma Mitsutaka (toshiyori, maegashira Kotoekō, born 1991)

== Assistant ==
- Kotoyūshō (wakaimonogashira, jūryō 13, real name Yoshiyuki Inagaki, born 1994)

== Notable active wrestlers ==
- Kotozakura (best rank ōzeki, born 1997)
- Kotoshōhō (best rank sekiwake, born 1999)
- Kotoeihō (best rank maegashira, born 2003)

== Notable former members ==
- Kotozakura (the 53rd yokozuna, 1940–2007)
- Kotogahama (ōzeki, 1927–1981)
- Kotokaze (ōzeki, born 1957)
- Kotomitsuki (ōzeki, born 1976)
- Kotoōshū (ōzeki, born 1983)
- Kotoshōgiku (ōzeki, born 1984)
- Kotogaume (sekiwake, born 1963)
- Hasegawa (sekiwake, 1944–2026)
- Kotonishiki (sekiwake, born 1968)
- Kotonowaka (sekiwake, born 1968)
- Kotofuji (sekiwake, 1964–2025)
- Kotoyūki (sekiwake, born 1991)
- Kotoinazuma (komusubi, born 1962)
- Kotobeppu (maegashira 1, born 1965)
- Kotoryū (maegashira 1, born 1972)
- Kototsubaki (maegashira 3, born 1960)
- Kotoekō (maegashira 4, born 1991)
- Kotokasuga (maegashira 7, born 1977)
- Kotoyūshō (jūryō 13, born 1994)
- Kototenzan (later known as the professional wrestler Earthquake, born 1963)

== Referees ==
- Shikimori Kinosuke (makushita gyōji, real name Kazuki Ikegami, born 1989)

== Ushers ==
- Kotozō (makuuchi yobidashi, real name Tsuyoshi Tsuma, born 1971)
- Kotoyoshi (makuuchi yobidashi, real name Masaki Takahashi, born 1970)

== Hairdresser ==
- Tokoazuma (third class tokoyama, born 1996)
- Tokohibiki (fourth class tokoyama, born 2001)

== Location and access ==
Chiba prefecture, Matsudo City, Kushizaki Minamicho 39
7 minute walk from Matsuhidai Station on the Hokusō Line

== See also ==
- List of sumo stables
- List of active sumo wrestlers
- List of past sumo wrestlers
- Glossary of sumo terms
