= Kotoshōgiku Kazuhiro =

Japanese sumo wrestler (born 1984)

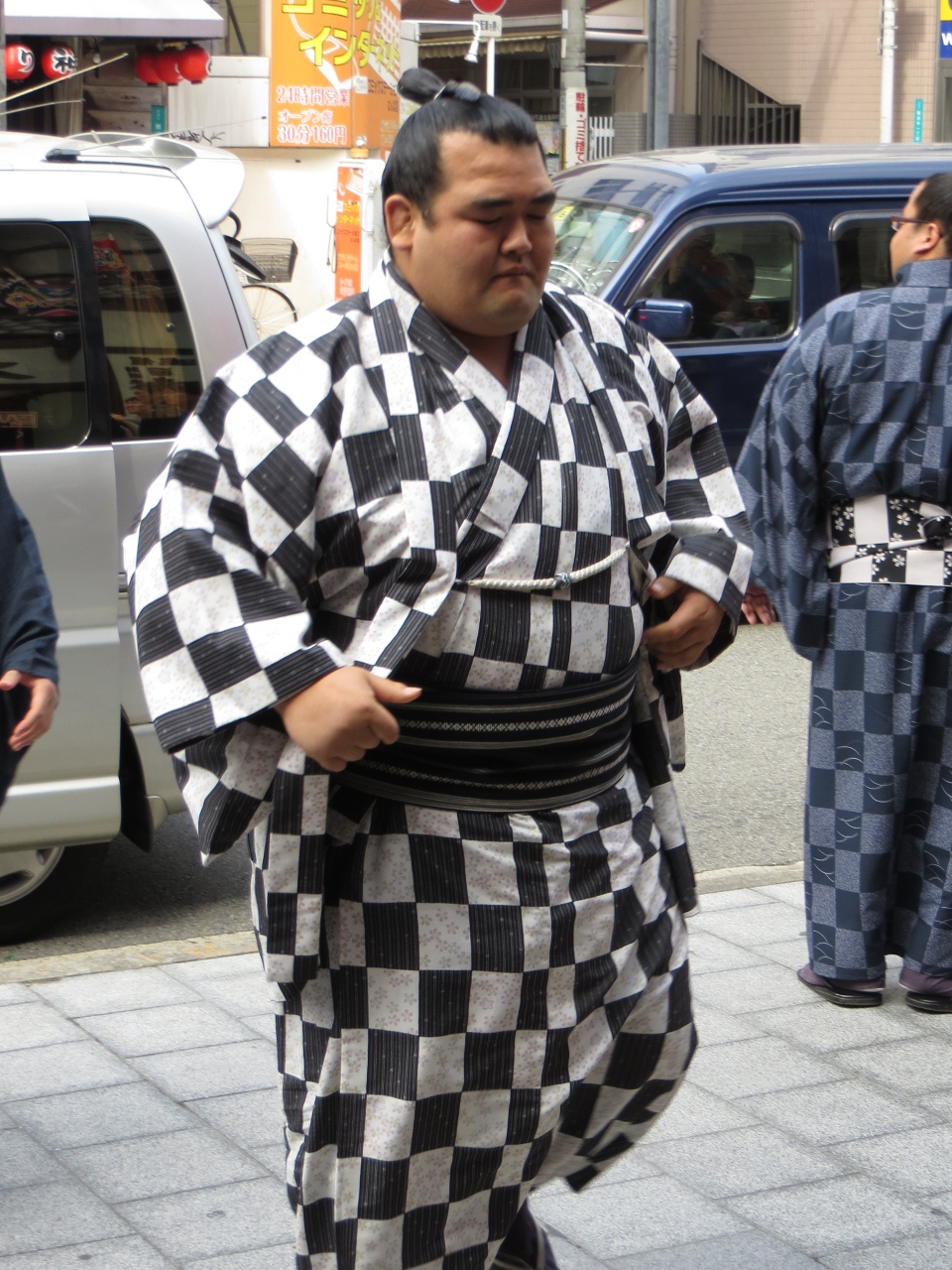
- Kotoshōgiku in 2013

Personal information
- Native name: 琴奨菊 和弘
- Born: Kazuhiro Kikutsugi; 30 January 1984 (age 42) Yanagawa, Fukuoka, Japan
- Height: 1.81 m (5 ft 11 1/2 in)
- Weight: 186 kg (410 lb; 29 st 4 lb)
- Website: https://web.archive.org/web/20080328073138/http://ameblo.jp/kotosyo-blog/page-1.html

Sport
- Sport: Sumo
- Retired: November 2020
- Heya: Sadogatake
- Record: 828-676-41
- Debut: January 2002
- Highest rank: Ōzeki (November 2011)
- Elder name: Hidenoyama
- Championships: 1 Makuuchi; 1 Jūryō
- Special Prizes: Technique (4), Outstanding Performance (3)
- Gold Stars: 3 Harumafuji; Kisenosato; Hakuho
- Updated on October 25, 2020

Kotoshōgiku Kazuhiro (Japanese: 琴奨菊 和弘; born 30 January 1984 as Kazuhiro Kikutsugi (菊次 一弘, Kikutsugi Kazuhiro) in Yanagawa, Fukuoka) is a Japanese former professional sumo wrestler. Wrestling for Sadogatake stable, he made his professional debut in 2002, and reached the top division in 2005. In 2011 he achieved the standard for promotion to the second highest rank of ōzeki by winning 33 bouts over three tournaments, and was formally promoted by the Japan Sumo Association on 28 September.

On 24 January 2016 he became the first Japanese-born wrestler in ten years to win a top-division tournament. He had a long-standing rivalry with Kisenosato against whom he fought a record 66 times, the most between two wrestlers in sumo history. He continued to fight after losing his ōzeki rank in January 2017, and in March 2020 became the oldest active sekitori. He announced his retirement from active competition on 14 November 2020. Kotoshōgiku earned seven special prizes in his career, won one top division tournament, and was runner-up in three others.

== Early life and sumo background ==
Kikutsugi was one of three brothers born to a builder. As a young boy he attended an area sumo exhibition and had his picture taken sitting on the lap of future yokozuna Takanohana. This encouraged him to try out sumo. He transferred to Meitoku Gijuku Junior High School which is well known for its strong sumo program. In 1998, his third year of junior high, he won a national sumo tournament and was named junior high school yokozuna. He continued sumo at Meitoku's high school. In his club were two Mongolians exchange students, the future sekitori Asasekiryū and future yokozuna Asashōryū. Having become known to the owner of Sadogatake for his sumo skills, he joined that stable after graduating from high school.

== Career ==
=== Early career ===
He fought his first professional bout in January 2002 under the shikona of Kotokikutsugi Kazuhiro (琴菊次 一弘). Rising quickly, he changed his ring surname to Kotoshōgiku in January 2004 before reaching jūryō in July 2004 and the top makuuchi division in January 2005. In May 2005 he changed the spelling of his shikona given name to 和弘. He steadily climbed the top division ranks, reaching maegashira 1 in July 2006, but a disastrous 3–12 result sent him back to maegashira 7. However, two 10–5 results in the following two tournaments saw him rise back up to maegashira 1 and earned him his first Technique special prize. He produced a strong 9–6 score in the 2007 New Year tournament.

In March 2007 he made his san'yaku debut at sekiwake rank, the first newcomer to the rank for nine tournaments. He made a poor start to the tournament, losing eight of his first nine bouts, but he showed great strength of character in winning the last six in a row to finish with a 7–8 record and remain in san'yaku, albeit at the lower rank of komusubi. Further losing scores in the next two tournaments caused him to slip to maegashira 3 by September 2007. However, a 10–5 mark in that tournament returned him to the titled ranks for November, again at komusubi. In that tournament he defeated yokozuna Hakuhō on the opening day and picked up his second Technique prize.

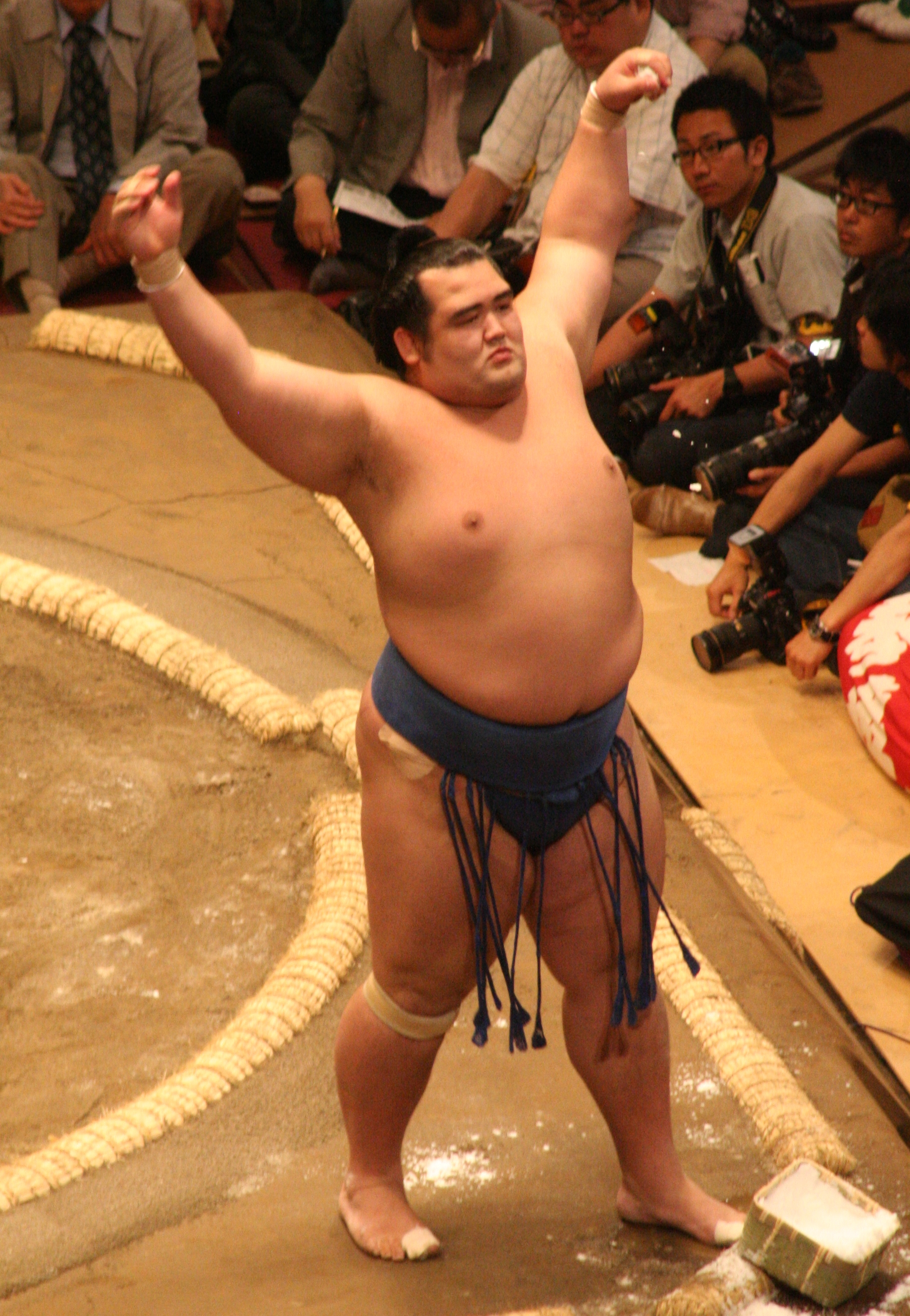
Kotoshōgiku warms up for his first match in the May 2009 tournament.

In January 2008 he was amongst the tournament leaders until he injured his right knee on the eighth day in a loss to Hakuhō and had to withdraw. This was the first time in his career that he had missed any tournament bouts. It was initially reported that he would need ten days of rest, but his stablemaster (the former Kotonowaka) indicated that Kotoshōgiku was keen to return to action as soon as possible. He re-entered the tournament from the 12th day, winning three of his four bouts to finish with nine wins. After this tournament he was named as one of seven wrestlers who NHK commentator Shuhei Nagao (the former Mainoumi) called the "Seven Samurai" and identified as "holding the key" to a Japanese resurgence in sumo, which was dominated by foreigners in the top ranks. (The others were Gōeidō, Kisenosato, Hōmashō, Toyohibiki, Toyonoshima and Tochiōzan).

Kotoshōgiku was promoted back to sekiwake for the March 2008 tournament, where he defeated the eventual tournament winner Asashōryū on the 12th day (his second career win over a yokozuna) to earn the Outstanding Performance award. He maintained his sekiwake rank for three tournaments but returned to the maegashira ranks after scoring only 6–9 in July 2008. In July 2009 he returned to the san'yaku ranks for the first time in six tournaments, at komusubi, and came through with a winning record. He made sekiwake again in September, but fell short with a 6–9 record. He returned to komusubi for the January 2010 tournament, following a strong 10–5 performance at the rank of maegashira 2 the previous November. However, he had only one win over a san'yaku wrestler in this tournament (ōzeki Kaiō) and could score only a make-koshi 6–9. In July 2010 he returned to the sekiwake rank after scoring 9–6 at komusubi in May. Despite admitting some involvement with gambling in the wake of the scandal surrounding his stablemate Kotomitsuki, it was not deemed serious enough to warrant a suspension. He scored only 5–10 in this tournament.

Returning to sekiwake once again in January 2011, he produced double digit wins for the first time in the san'yaku ranks, scoring 11–4 and winning his third Technique prize. Sumo Association official Takanohana indicated that Kotoshōgiku would be considered for ōzeki promotion if he won or came close to winning the following tournament in March. However, that tournament was cancelled due to a match-fixing scandal, and in the following May 2011 'technical examination' tournament he finished out of contention on 10–5. Needing to win at least twelve bouts in July to be considered for ōzeki promotion, Kotoshogiku seemed on course by Day 11 when he defeated Hakuho for just the second time to move to 9–2. However, he then lost two in a row to rank-and-filers Okinoumi and Wakanosato, dashing any hopes of immediate promotion. He finished the tournament on 11–4 and was awarded his second Outstanding Performance prize.

=== Ōzeki ===
In the September 2011 tournament Kotoshōgiku put in another strong performance, faltering only against fellow sekiwake Kakuryū and maegashira Tochiōzan before beating Hakuhō for the second time in a row on Day 13. This put both men at 10–2 and left open the possibility of a playoff for the yūshō on the final day. In the event however, Kotoshōgiku lost his last bout to ōzeki Baruto while Hakuhō won to clinch his twentieth championship. Nevertheless, Kotoshogiku at 12–3 had achieved the necessary number of 33 wins over the last three tournaments to earn ōzeki promotion. Takanohana commented "Beating the yokozuna was a big factor. It was close to a unanimous decision by the judging committee to promote him." Kotoshōgiku became the first Japanese wrestler to be promoted to ōzeki since his former stablemate Kotomitsuki in 2007. He was also awarded special prizes for Outstanding Performance (his third) and Technique (his fourth). In his debut ōzeki tournament he won his first nine matches, although he lost to two fellow ōzeki and yokozuna Hakuhō and finished at 11–4. He did not win more than ten bouts in a basho over the next year, and had to withdraw from the September 2012 tournament after suffering a knee injury. He was injured again and withdrew early in the November 2013 tournament; after returning he had two mediocre performances followed by a very poor 5–10 in May 2014 and was kadoban, at risk of losing his ōzeki status. In the July 2014 tournament, he responded with his best performance as an ōzeki, and was tied for the lead going into the final day before losing to Gōeidō and finishing 12–3. This was his first runner-up performance as an ōzeki and the third overall in his career. After a mediocre 9–6 in September, he once again fell kadoban after a poor 6–9 performance in the November tournament. However, he comfortably held his rank in the opening tournament of 2015. Another 6–9 in May 2015 saw him kadoban yet again. In July his record was 5–7 after twelve days but he preserved his rank with three consecutive wins including a last day victory over Terunofuji. September 2015 saw a return to form as he recorded an 11–4 result to tie for third place. In November he started strongly, winning seven of his first eight matches, but then began to struggle and withdrew injured on day 14 to end with an 8–6–1 record.

The January 2016 tournament marked ten years since Tochiazuma became the last Japanese-born wrestler to win the top-division title. Kotoshōgiku began it with ten straight victories (including wins over Kisenosato and Kakuryū) before attempting to take sole possession of the lead against the similarly undefeated Hakuhō on day 11. Kotoshōgiku had won only four of their previous fifty meetings but started aggressively, forced the yokozuna to the edge and won by oshidashi: Hakuhō said of the winner; "He is better than he's ever been. I thought I had room to work with, but I was on the straw before I knew it". Kotoshōgiku maintained his lead with a win over Harumafuji and said after the contest "I did what I had to do and gave everything I had. I'm getting calmer every passing day. I've come through tough times so I'd like to have the mindset to enjoy this. I just have to win a battle with myself". On day 13 his winning run ended as he sustained an upset loss to the maegashira Toyonoshima, a long-time friend. A win against Tochiōzan meant that he entered the final day one win in front of Hakuhō and Toyonoshima, and needing a win over Gōeidō to claim the championship. He defeated his opponent by tsukiotoshi to win the tournament with a 14–1 record. His parents, who were in attendance, reportedly burst into tears whilst fans in his hometown of Yanagawa celebrated after watching his victory on a big screen. Interviewed after the match he said "I'm so happy, I can't even put it into words. But I'm also thrilled because I'm standing here now thanks to a great number of people who supported me when I struggled and didn't get the results I wanted". At a press conference on 16 February, he reflected on the ten-year wait for a Japanese winner and remarked that his fellow Japanese wrestlers may lack the will to win that Mongolian wrestlers have shown. "All the Japanese wrestlers want to win championships... but sumo is about winning. Maybe we Japanese are too set in our ways, maybe we lack the greed to win at all costs... We can learn from them."

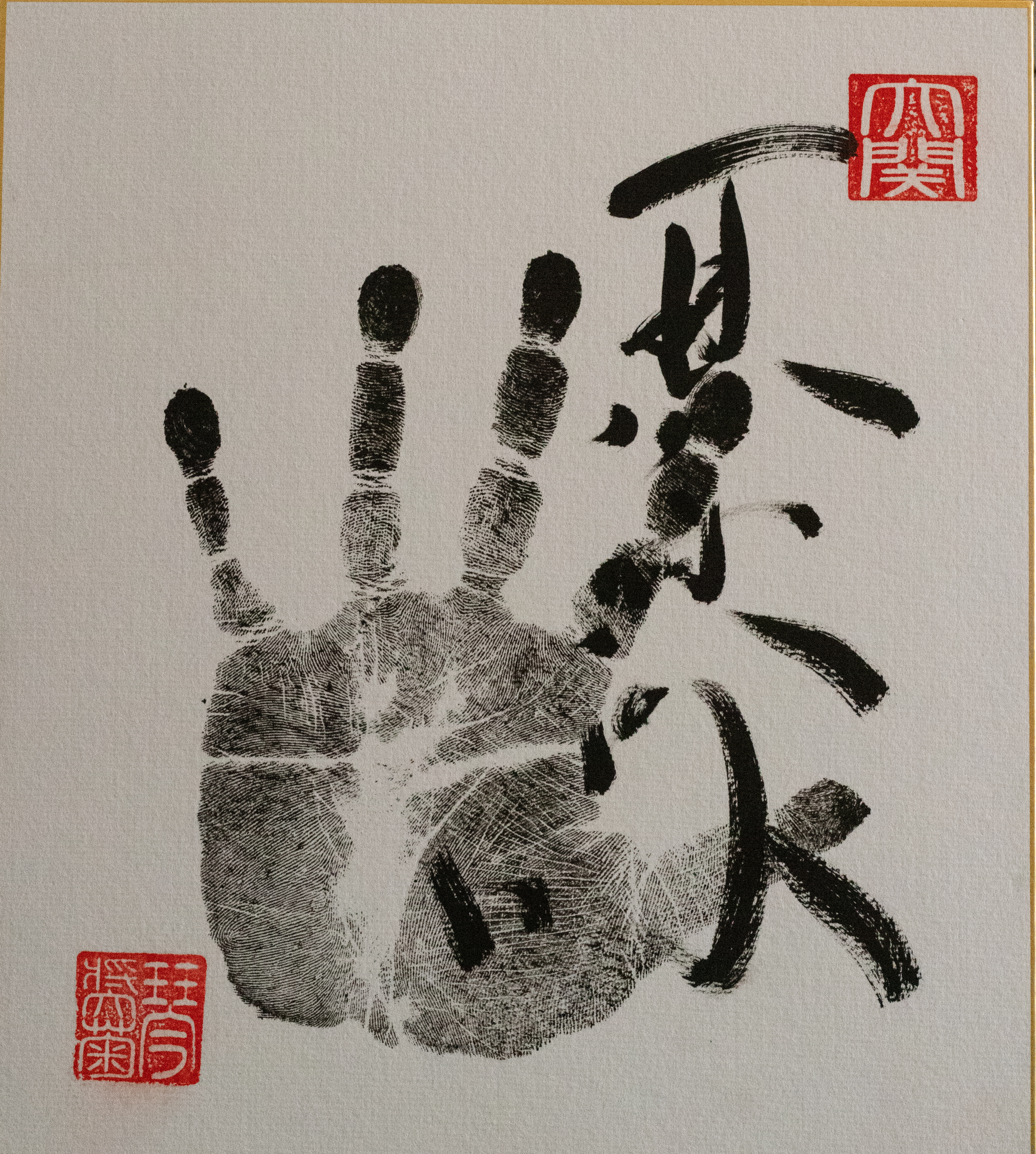
Kotoshogiku Ozeki original tegata (handprint & signature)

The head of the Japan Sumo Association's Judging Department, Isegahama-oyakata, indicated that if he achieved a "high quality championship" in the March Grand Sumo Tournament, he would be recommended for promotion to yokozuna rank. This would have made Kotoshōgiku the first Japanese yokozuna to be promoted since Wakanohana Masaru in 1998. In March he began very strongly to win seven of his first eight matches. His hopes of promotion however, disappeared in the second week as he suffered a series of defeats and ended with an 8–7 record. He withdrew from the July 2016 tournament in Nagoya after suffering five losses in the first six days, citing knee and foot injuries. He escaped demotion with a 9–6 record in September. In November 2016 Kotoshōgiku did not have the best tournament managing only five wins which put him in kadoban status for the January 2017 tournament, the seventh time in his career. Kotoshōgiku did not perform well in the January 2017 tournament and was only able to get a 5–10 record, but was able to give Kisenosato, who ended up winning the tournament, his only defeat. Since Kotoshōgiku was kadoban and failed to get the necessary 8 wins he was demoted to sekiwake after 32 tournaments at ōzeki.

=== Post ōzeki career ===
In March 2017, Kotoshōgiku was unable to obtain the ten wins required to return immediately to ōzeki status, falling one win short at 9–6. His sixth defeat was controversial – up against Terunofuji on Day 14, with Terunofuji among the leaders, Kotoshōgiku needed to win his last two matches for a return to ōzeki. At the tachiai, Terunofuji sidestepped the onrushing Kotoshōgiku and won by hatakikomi, ending the popular Kotoshōgiku's quest for a return to ōzeki with the palpable disapproval of the Osaka crowd. In May he lost seven of his first eight bouts and despite mounting a spirited comeback in the second week he ended with a 7–8 record and was relegated to komusubi. Another 7–8 result followed in July resulting in him dropping to the maegashira ranks. On the third day of the September 2017 tournament he defeated Harumafuji, earning his first career kinboshi for an upset of a yokozuna while ranked as a maegashira. Kotoshogiku is the fourth wrestler to get his first kinboshi as a former ozeki, following Miyabiyama, Takanonami and Noshirogata. He returned to the san'yaku ranks at komusubi for the November 2017 tournament. In January 2018 he defeated Kisenosato to earn his second kinboshi. This was his 66th and final makuuchi bout against Kisenosato, the highest number of contests between two wrestlers in sumo history. He had defeated Kisenosato 34 times, with 29 losses (not including two wins by default and one loss by default). He was forced to withdraw from the July 2018 tournament after suffering a tendon injury in his left elbow during a defeat to Tamawashi on Day 10 in which he was thrown from the dohyo with a kotenage armlock throw. In March 2019 he was in contention for the Fighting Spirit prize but was defeated on the final day; however he still finished with a strong 11–4 record. He defeated Hakuhō on Day 14 of the July 2019 tournament, to earn his third kinboshi, a record for an ex-ōzeki. He was nominated for a fourth Outstanding Performance Prize as a result, but was defeated on the final day of the tournament and so missed out on the award.

By 2020 Kotoshōgiku had fallen towards the bottom of the makuuchi division, although he said he had not lost his motivation to keep fighting. During the January 2020 tournament he tied with Takanohana on 701 top division wins, ninth place on the all-time list, and said he felt honoured to find his name next to him. He surpassed Takanohana and Musashimaru in the following tournament, and Harumafuji and Kisenosato in July, to rise to sixth place on the all-time list, finishing his makuuchi career with 718 wins. His 92 top division tournaments is the seventh highest in history. He became the oldest active sekitori in March 2020, following the retirements of Toyonoshima and Sōkokurai.

== Retirement from sumo ==
Kotoshōgiku withdrew from the September 2020 tournament after a torn muscle in his lower left leg, but returned from Day 7. He was only able to win one more match and finished with a 2–10–3 record. Kotoshōgiku reportedly told the mayor of Yanagawa that he would continue to wrestle, even after being demoted to jūryō. After losing four of his first five matches, he withdrew from the November tournament and retired from competition on Day 6. As the owner of the Hidenoyama toshiyori kabu or elder stock, he assumed the Hidenoyama (秀ノ山) name and became a coach at Sadogatake stable.

Kotoshōgiku's retirement ceremony was held on 1 October 2022 at the Ryōgoku Kokugikan.

In May 2023, Kotoshōgiku announced that he was planning to open his own stable in 2024. Although the groundbreaking ceremony took place in November 2023, the stable officially opened on 19 October 2024, with four wrestlers, all ranked in the jonidan division.

== Personal life ==
Kotoshōgiku announced his engagement in February 2015, revealing that he had proposed the previous October. He credited his fiancée with helping him through his injury in the Kyushu 2013 tournament. Kotoshōgiku had previously announced an engagement in November 2012, but that was broken off three months later. After marrying in the summer of 2015, the wedding reception was held on 30 January 2016, Kotoshōgiku's 32nd birthday, and just a week after his first tournament championship. 630 guests, including former Prime Minister Yoshiro Mori, attended. The couple's first child was born in May 2017.

== Fighting style ==
Kotoshōgiku was a yotsu-sumo specialist, preferring techniques which involved grabbing the opponent's mawashi or belt. He favoured a right hand outside, left hand inside grip (hidari-yotsu). His most common winning technique was a straightforward yori-kiri or force out, which he used in sixty percent of his career victories. His trademark was gaburi-yori, which involves using the torso to bump the opponent out, aided by a low centre of gravity and momentum. The next most often used technique was oshi-dashi or push out. His style was simple, aggressive and direct but could be somewhat predictable, and he was not noted as a technician. He was also notable for the exaggerated back stretch he performed just before the tachiai, dubbed the "Koto Bauer" after the Ina Bauer figure skating move, which often generated a reaction from the audience in attendance. He eventually gave up this routine, but brought it back for his final match before retirement.

== Career record ==
Kotoshōgiku Kazuhiro
| Year | January Hatsu basho, Tokyo | March Haru basho, Osaka | May Natsu basho, Tokyo | July Nagoya basho, Nagoya | September Aki basho, Tokyo | November Kyūshū basho, Fukuoka |
|---|---|---|---|---|---|---|
| 2002 | (Maezumo) | East Jonokuchi #32; 6–1 | East Jonidan #61; 7–0–P | West Sandanme #59; 5–2 | West Sandanme #29; 6–1 | East Makushita #46; 6–1 |
| 2003 | East Makushita #20; 3–4 | East Makushita #30; 4–3 | West Makushita #24; 4–3 | East Makushita #19; 5–2 | West Makushita #10; 3–4 | West Makushita #17; 3–4 |
| 2004 | East Makushita #22; 6–1 | West Makushita #6; 4–3 | West Makushita #5; 5–2 | East Jūryō #13; 10–5 | West Jūryō #5; 9–6 | West Jūryō #3; 10–5 |
| 2005 | East Maegashira #16; 5–10 | East Jūryō #4; 13–2; Champion | East Maegashira #14; 10–5 | East Maegashira #9; 8–7 | East Maegashira #6; 7–8 | East Maegashira #7; 6–9 |
| 2006 | West Maegashira #10; 8–7 | East Maegashira #8; 9–6 | East Maegashira #3; 9–6 | East Maegashira #1; 3–12 | West Maegashira #7; 10–5 | East Maegashira #2; 10–5; T |
| 2007 | East Maegashira #1; 9–6 | West Sekiwake #1; 7–8 | West Komusubi #1; 7–8 | East Maegashira #1; 5–10 | West Maegashira #3; 10–5 | West Komusubi #1; 9–6; T |
| 2008 | East Komusubi #1; 9–4–2 | West Sekiwake #1; 8–7; O | West Sekiwake #1; 8–7 | West Sekiwake #1; 6–9 | East Maegashira #1; 6–9 | East Maegashira #3; 9–6 |
| 2009 | East Maegashira #1; 6–9 | East Maegashira #2; 6–9 | East Maegashira #6; 10–5 | West Komusubi #1; 8–7 | West Sekiwake #1; 6–9 | East Maegashira #2; 10–5 |
| 2010 | East Komusubi #1; 6–9 | West Maegashira #3; 10–5 | East Komusubi #1; 9–6 | West Sekiwake #1; 5–10 | East Maegashira #3; 9–6 | West Maegashira #1; 9–6 |
| 2011 | West Sekiwake #1; 11–4; T | East Sekiwake #1; Tournament Cancelled; Match fixing investigation 0–0–0 | East Sekiwake #1; 10–5 | East Sekiwake #1; 11–4; O | East Sekiwake #1; 12–3; OT | West Ōzeki #2; 11–4 |
| 2012 | West Ōzeki #1; 8–7 | West Ōzeki #3; 9–6 | West Ōzeki #2; 10–5 | West Ōzeki #1; 10–5 | East Ōzeki #2; 2–2–11 | East Ōzeki #2; 8–7 |
| 2013 | West Ōzeki #2; 8–7 | West Ōzeki #2; 8–7 | East Ōzeki #2; 11–4 | West Ōzeki #1; 9–6 | East Ōzeki #2; 10–5 | West Ōzeki #1; 1–2–12 |
| 2014 | East Ōzeki #2; 9–6 | West Ōzeki #1; 8–7 | West Ōzeki #1; 5–10 | West Ōzeki #1; 12–3 | East Ōzeki #1; 9–6 | East Ōzeki #1; 6–9 |
| 2015 | West Ōzeki #1; 9–6 | West Ōzeki #1; 8–7 | West Ōzeki #1; 6–9 | East Ōzeki #2; 8–7 | West Ōzeki #2; 11–4 | East Ōzeki #2; 8–6–1 |
| 2016 | East Ōzeki #2; 14–1 | East Ōzeki #1; 8–7 | East Ōzeki #2; 10–5 | West Ōzeki #1; 1–6–8 | West Ōzeki #2; 9–6 | East Ōzeki #2; 5–10 |
| 2017 | West Ōzeki #2; 5–10 | East Sekiwake #2; 9–6 | East Sekiwake #2; 7–8 | West Komusubi #1; 7–8 | West Maegashira #1; 10–5 ★ | East Komusubi #1; 6–9 |
| 2018 | West Maegashira #2; 7–8 ★ | East Maegashira #3; 6–9 | East Maegashira #5; 8–7 | West Maegashira #1; 3–8–4 | West Maegashira #8; 7–8 | East Maegashira #9; 10–5 |
| 2019 | East Maegashira #4; 6–9 | West Maegashira #8; 11–4 | West Maegashira #1; 6–9 | East Maegashira #5; 7–8 ★ | East Maegashira #7; 6–9 | East Maegashira #9; 6–9 |
| 2020 | East Maegashira #13; 7–8 | East Maegashira #13; 7–8 | East Maegashira #14; Tournament Cancelled; State of Emergency; 0–0–0 | East Maegashira #14; 8–7 | West Maegashira #11; 2–10–3 | West Jūryō #3; Retired; 1–6 |
Record given as wins–losses–absences Top division champion Top division runner-up Retired Lower divisions Non-participation Sanshō key: F=Fighting spirit; O=Outstanding performance; T=Technique Also shown: ★=Kinboshi; P=Playoff(s); Divisions: Makuuchi — Jūryō — Makushita — Sandanme — Jonidan — Jonokuchi Makuuchi ranks: Yokozuna — Ōzeki — Sekiwake — Komusubi — Maegashira

== See also ==
- List of sumo tournament top division champions
- List of sumo tournament top division runners-up
- List of sumo tournament second division champions
- List of sumo record holders
- Glossary of sumo terms
- List of past sumo wrestlers
- List of sumo elders
- List of ōzeki
