= Kotonishiki Noboru =

Sumo wrestler (1922–1974)

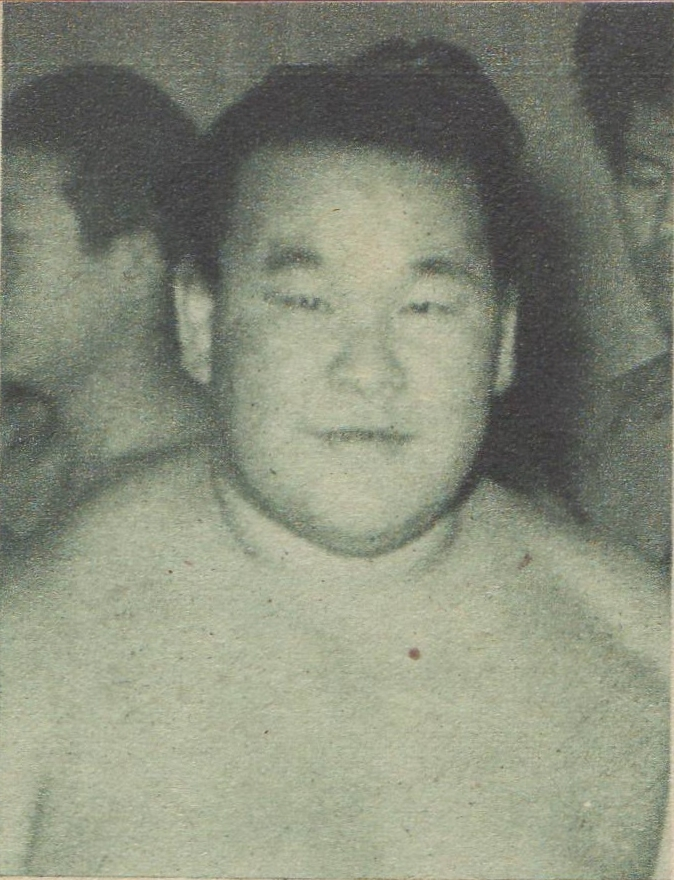

Personal information
- Native name: 琴錦 登
- Born: Noboru Fujimura; March 7, 1922 Kanonji, Kagawa, Japan
- Died: July 14, 1974 (aged 52)
- Height: 177 cm (5 ft 9 1/2 in)
- Weight: 120 kg (265 lb; 18 st 13 lb)

Sport
- Sport: Sumo
- Retired: May 1955
- Heya: Nishonoseki
- Record: 258-256-23
- Debut: January 1938
- Highest rank: Komusubi
- Elder name: Sadogatake
- Championships: 1 (Jonidan)
- Special Prizes: 1 (Fighting Spirit)
- Gold Stars: 7
- Updated on June 2020

Kotonishiki Noboru (March 7, 1922 – July 14, 1974, born Noboru Fujimura) was a sumo wrestler and coach from Kanonji, Kagawa, Japan. His highest rank was komusubi. He was runner-up in the January 1949 tournament and earned seven gold stars for defeating yokozuna. After his retirement in 1955 he founded the Sadogatake stable and produced yokozuna Kotozakura among others. He ran the stable until his death in 1974.

== Career record ==
Kotonishiki Noboru
-	Spring Haru basho, Tokyo	Summer Natsu basho, Tokyo	Autumn Aki basho, Tokyo
1938	(Maezumo)	(Maezumo)	Not held
1939	West Jonokuchi #21; 4–3	East Jonidan #35; 8–0; Champion	Not held
1940	West Sandanme #35; 5–3	East Sandanme #15; 4–4	Not held
1941	East Sandanme #10; 5–3	West Makushita #34; 5–3	Not held
1942	West Makushita #20; 3–5	East Makushita #22; 5–3	Not held
1943	West Makushita #10; 6–2	East Jūryō #12; 9–6	Not held
1944	West Jūryō #6; 10–5	East Jūryō #1; 6–4	East Maegashira #17; 5–5
1945	Not held	West Maegashira #8; 5–2	West Maegashira #2; 3–7
1946	Not held	Not held	West Maegashira #6; 7–6
1947	Not held	East Maegashira #3; 7–3	East Komusubi #2; 4–7
1948	Not held	East Maegashira #3; 4–7	East Maegashira #8; 6–5
1949	East Maegashira #7; 10–3	East Maegashira #2; 4–11 ★★	West Maegashira #6; 8–7
1950	West Maegashira #2; 5–10	West Maegashira #6; 4–11	West Maegashira #11; 7–8
1951	East Maegashira #12; 7–8	West Maegashira #13; 11–4	West Maegashira #3; 8–7
1952	East Komusubi; 8–7	East Komusubi; 5–10	East Maegashira #3; 8–7 ★
Record given as wins–losses–absences Top division champion Top division runner-up Retired Lower divisions Non-participation Sanshō key: F=Fighting spirit; O=Outstanding performance; T=Technique Also shown: ★=Kinboshi; P=Playoff(s); Divisions: Makuuchi — Jūryō — Makushita — Sandanme — Jonidan — Jonokuchi Makuuchi ranks: Yokozuna — Ōzeki — Sekiwake — Komusubi — Maegashira

-	New Year Hatsu basho, Tokyo	Spring Haru basho, Osaka	Summer Natsu basho, Tokyo	Autumn Aki basho, Tokyo
1953	East Maegashira #1; 3–12 ★	East Maegashira #7; 10–5	East Maegashira #4; 6–9 ★	East Maegashira #6; 10–5; F★
1954	East Maegashira #1; 2–9–4 ★	West Maegashira #7; 1–10–4	West Maegashira #16; 11–4	East Maegashira #7; 7–8
1955	East Maegashira #9; 7–8	West Maegashira #10; 5–10	West Maegashira #15; Retired; 0–0–15	x
Record given as wins–losses–absences Top division champion Top division runner-up Retired Lower divisions Non-participation Sanshō key: F=Fighting spirit; O=Outstanding performance; T=Technique Also shown: ★=Kinboshi; P=Playoff(s); Divisions: Makuuchi — Jūryō — Makushita — Sandanme — Jonidan — Jonokuchi Makuuchi ranks: Yokozuna — Ōzeki — Sekiwake — Komusubi — Maegashira

== See also ==
- List of past sumo wrestlers
- List of komusubi
