= Shikona =

Ring name of a sumo wrestler

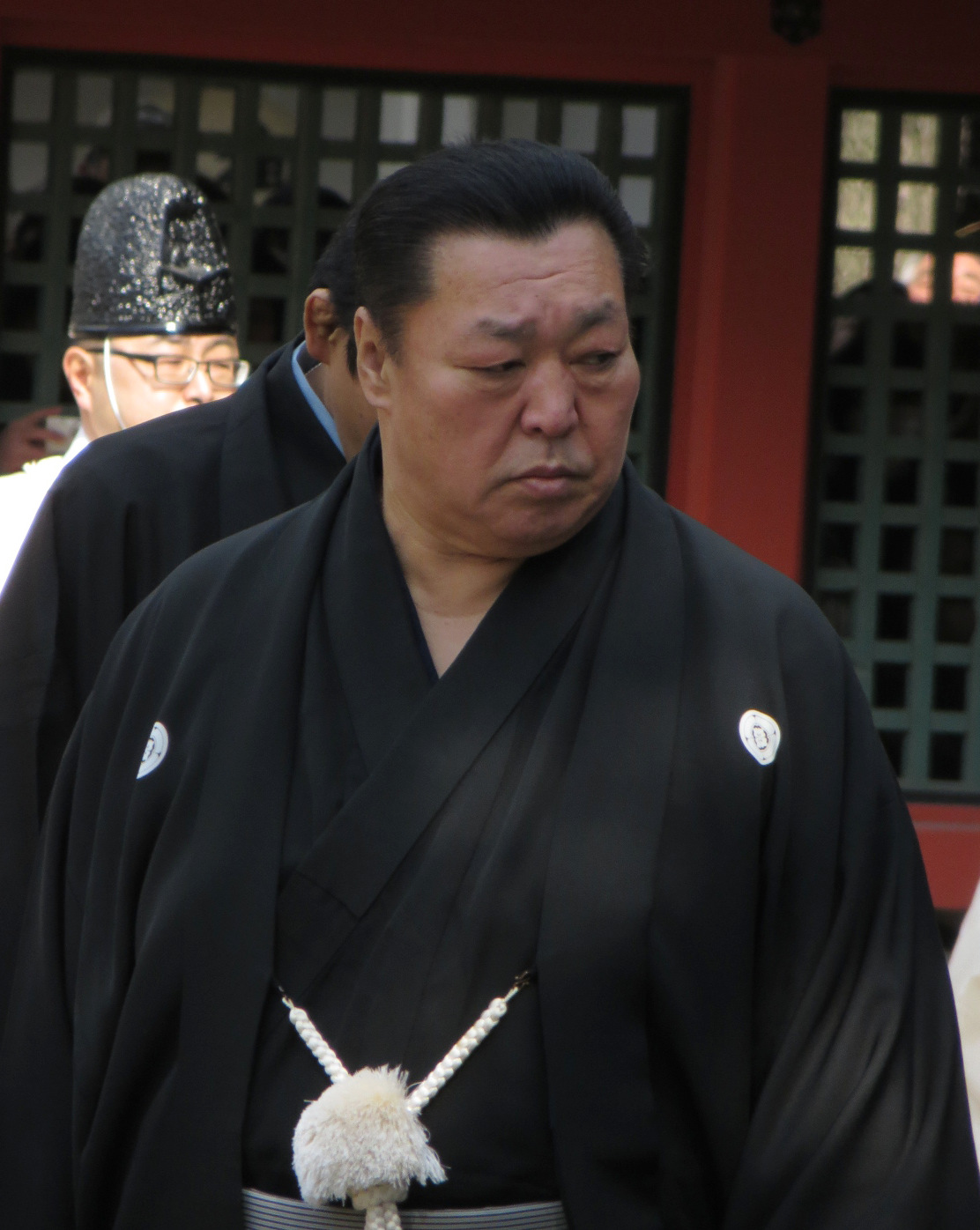
Japanese sumo wrestler Toshimitsu Obata was known by his shikona Kitanoumi Toshimitsu, and he was generally referred to simply as Kitanoumi.

A shikona (Japanese: 四股名 or 醜名) is a sumo wrestler's ring name. The use of ring names in sumo dates back to the Muromachi period and developed further in the Edo period, when ring names were used to hide the identities of early rikishi, many of whom were masterless samurai called rōnins. By the 20th century, use of ring names became governed by customs within the Japan Sumo Association.

Traditionally, a wrestler's shikona is given to him by his master; the wrestler may influence the decision. Inspiration for the ring name is frequently drawn from characters associated with the wrester's family, sumo stable, or master. Other common sources include place names, mythology, and natural phenomena. While unusual, it is also possible for a sekitori to wrestle under his legal name.

The general public is expected to refer to an active wrestler by his ring name. A wrestler may use either his shikona or birth name in private settings, including at his stable. Retired wrestlers who become toshiyori give up their shikona and adopt the name associated with their elder share. Special rules applied to exceptionally successful yokozuna, who until 2021 were sometimes permitted to use their ring name as their coaching name.

== History ==
Sources attesting to the use of pseudonyms by sumo wrestlers and other martial artists date back to the mid-1500s, during the Muromachi period. The archaic spelling of the term used the kanji for ugliness (醜) and had a meaning associated with humility. During the Edo period, the spelling of shikona changed to incorporate the kanji for shiko (四股), the sumo leg-stomping ritual, which had phonetic similarity to the kanji for ugliness. In this period, shikona came to refer exclusively to the ring names of sumo wrestlers.

The period of peace established under the Tokugawa shogunate reduced the daimyō's demand for samurai military service, resulting in an increase in the number of masterless samurai, called rōnin. Due to the rigid social hierarchies of the period, many rōnin struggled to find alternative employment. Some such rōnin leveraged their martial skills in street sumo tournaments, called tsuji-sumo (辻相撲; lit. 'street-corner wrestling'), for the entertainment of passers-by. The shame associated with their loss of status led these samurai to adopt shikona to hide their true identities.

As street sumo increased in popularity, cases of violence began to be reported in the pleasure districts where many matches took place. The Edo authorities addressed the public disorder by implementing restrictions on public sumo, including a ban on the use of shikona by wrestlers. These restrictions culminated in 1661 with a total prohibition against sumo. The practice of sumo continued illegally until 1684, when a rōnin named Ikazuchi Gondaiyū obtained permission from the Edo authorities to hold an official tournament, making sumo and its customs legal again under a new organization. During the Hōreki era, wrestlers who retired and established themselves as coaches began to inherit and assume the names of their predecessors.

From 1941 to 2021, there was a way for exceptional wrestlers to become toshiyori within the Japan Sumo Association under their shikona, on condition that the ring name disappeared after the owner's final retirement.

== Assuming a shikona ==
=== General use ===
In professional sumo, a proverb says that a wrestler has three names: his birth name, his ring name and the name he takes when he can retire and train younger wrestlers. The shikona itself is made up of a family name, which in the traditional presentation of Japanese names comes before the first name, and a given name.

All active wrestlers must have a shikona; in the case the wrestler fights under their birth name, this is considered the shikona. It is common to see new recruits fighting under their birth name before later choosing a pseudonym, while others adopt a new name from their professional debut. Wrestlers who start their career using their birth name typically change their ring name by the time they achieve promotion to the jūryō or makuuchi divisions. While unusual, some choose to wrestle their entire career under their real name, with this becoming more common in the 21st century. Sekitori making this choice include Takayasu, Shōdai, Endō, Ura, Dejima and Wajima, the only yokozuna to have used his real name throughout his career.

Traditionally, wrestlers have no say in the choice of their shikona. The selection may be made by the wrestler's master, the master's wife (the okamisan) or even a sponsor; the name is communicated to the wrester by his master. Informally, however, the master often listens to the opinion of the wrestler who is to inherit the shikona.

It is possible for a wrestler to change his shikona during his career, with some keeping a name throughout their career and others going through multiple changes. A common occasion for adopting a new shikona is in recognition of an important promotion. Other reasons can apply, such as a master changing a wrestler's name in order to inspire him to progress through the ranks.

The history and tradition associated with specific shikona can increase expectations on their bearers. According to the Japan Sumo Association, it is expected that the general public refer to active wrestlers by their shikona. In private, either can be used, with masters often using their wrestlers' birth names during training and wrestlers' relatives continuing to call them by their birth names.

=== After retirement ===
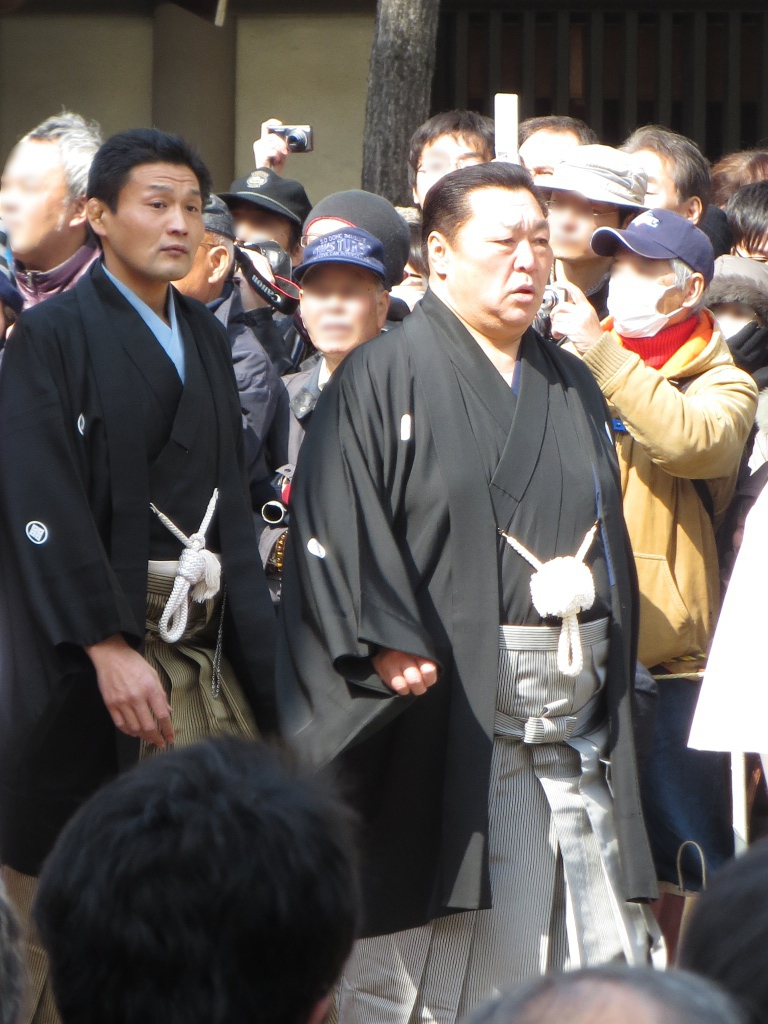
Both yokozuna Takanohana and Kitanoumi were granted the privilege of using their ring names as "lifetime" elder shares.

Specific rules exist for ring names after the retirement of the wrestlers bearing them. For yokozuna, these names are referred to as tomena (止め名; lit. 'stopped name') which are not to be inherited, with the exception of direct disciples of the last holder. Exceptions to the normal acquisition of toshiyori were also made for the most successful rikishi, with certain yokozuna being offered a "single generation" or "lifetime" elder share, called ichidai toshiyori kabu (一代年寄株). This process allowed a wrestler to stay as an elder without having to use a traditional share in the association and enter his retirement duties with his ring name. Only wrestlers with extraordinary careers were eligible for this privilege. In October 2021, yokozuna Hakuhō, the wrestler with the most top-division championships, retired, and it was expected that he would earn the right to inherit a Hakuhō share in view of his sporting exploits. Hakuhō was however denied the ichidai toshiyori kabu and Masayuki Yamauchi (a Yokozuna Deliberation Council member) declared in a press conference that "no such system exists" under the new Public Interest Incorporated Foundation statutes of the association, implying that the system would no longer be used.

When they retire, not all wrestlers are eligible to become toshiyori. Some wrestlers may find official roles within the Japan Sumo Association in subordinate positions as wakaimonogashira or sewanin. These positions are limited, but former wrestlers who are selected for them retain their shikona as their professional name even though they are no longer active. Other retired wrestlers give up their ring names and are subsequently referred to by their birth names.

== Inspirations ==
Although shikona are written with characters that evoke words or ideas, there is usually no literal meaning to the full name.

Early in the Edo period it was common for ring names to refer to places of origin or natural features such as mountains and rivers. Later in the period, ring names became more promotional, with wrestlers often choosing shikona designed to appeal to spectators. Such ring names often incorporated references to storms, wild animals, weapons or gods to present the wrester as strong or fierce. During the Meiji Restoration, wrestlers adopted names referring to their places of birth. With the westernization of Japan, many wrestlers took shikona that reflected new innovations in Japanese life; examples from the period include Shinkeihō Genshichi (新刑法 源七; New penal code) or Denkitō Kōnosuke (電気燈 光之介; Electric light).

It is customary for shikona to be influenced by naming traditions associated with the wrestler's stable. Examples of characters frequently re-used within certain stables include that of Japanese horse-chestnut (栃), within Kasugano stable, or Koto (琴), within Sadogatake stable. The Isegahama and now-defunct Miyagino stables include for tradition the characters for Mount Fuji (富士) and peng (鵬), respectively, of which the latter was inspired by their stable master, Hakuhō Shō.

It is also common for a wrestler to inherit the shikona of a family member who had previously been a wrestler. An example of family transmission would be Kotozakura II, who began his career under his father's shikona before inheriting his grandfather's upon promotion to ōzeki. If a wrestler from outside the family also wishes to inherit the shikona of a former wrestler, it is traditionally required that the master ask permission from the family of the wrestler in question.

Wrestlers often incorporate a character from their master's name into their own name. Sometimes, a master may even propose that one of his wrestlers inherit his own ring name. In 2023, then-sekiwake Kiribayama changed his name to Kirishima when he was promoted to the rank of ōzeki, so that he would evoke his master.

Kanji may be chosen to inspire wrestlers bearing the shikona. For example, in 2023, Ōshōma changed the first name of his shikona, Degi (出喜), with the kanji for energy (出気), with the same pronunciation, to ward off the risk of injury after a series of setbacks. Although any characters can be used for ring names, certain kanji are often found in shikona. These include:

| Characters | | Observations |
| Translation | Japanese | Observations |
|---|---|---|
| Mountain | 山 | |
| Rice field | 田 | |
| Great | 大 | |
| Youth | 若 | |
| Dragon | 龍 | |
| River | 川 | |
| Sea | 海 | |
| Koto | 琴 | Character used consistently within Sadogatake stable. |
| Mount Fuji | 富士 | Characters used consistently within Isegahama stable. |
| Wisteria | 藤 | |
| Brocade | 錦 | |
| Field | 野 | |
| Flower | 花 | |
| Wave | 波 | |
| Noble | 貴 | |
| Country | 国 | |
| Morning | 朝 | |
| North | 北 | |
| Island | 島 | |
| Japanese horse-chestnut | 栃 | Character used consistently within Kasugano stable. |
| Power | 力 | |
| Rising sun | 旭 | |
| Cherry blossom | 櫻 | |
| Abundance | 豊 | |
| Heaven | 天 | |

== Examples ==
=== Inspired by geographical locations ===
| Shikona | | Origins and observations |
| Rōmaji transliteration | Japanese | Origins and observations |
|---|---|---|
| Umegatani | 梅ヶ谷 | The name is that of a village in present-day Fukushima Prefecture. |
| Shiranui | 不知火 | The name of a sea bordering Kumamoto Prefecture. |
| Hitachiyama | 常陸山 | Both names are taken from mountains located in the old Etchū Province. |
| Tachiyama | 太刀山 | Both names are taken from mountains located in the old Etchū Province. |
| Musashiyama | 武藏山 | The former name of Saitama Prefecture. |
| Tochigiyama | 栃木山 | Inspired by Tochigi Prefecture. |
| Kurohimeyama | 黒姫山 | Inspired by Mount Kurohime in Nagano Prefecture. |
| Sentoryū | 戦闘竜 | Transliteration of Sentoryū's hometown name: St. Louis. |
| Kotoōshū | 琴欧洲 | Ring name combining characters from both the Sadogatake stable naming tradition (琴; Koto) and for Europe (欧洲), since Kotoōshū is originally from Bulgaria. |
| Baruto | 把瑠都 | Ring name chosen by transliteration to evoke the Baltic Sea, bordering the wrestler's native Estonia. |
| Shōnanzakura | 勝南桜 | Name given to evoke the Shōnan region in Kanagawa Prefecture. However, the first kanji of the province's name (湘) has been replaced by the kanji meaning victory (勝), with the same pronunciation, to encourage the eponymous wrestler to win matches. |

=== Inspired by a stable tradition ===
| Shikona | | Origins and observations |
| Rōmaji transliteration | Japanese | Origins and observations |
|---|---|---|
| Kashiwado | 柏戸 | A lineage name within Isenoumi stable, this shikona dated from the mid-Edo era and was only given to wrestlers seen as future champions. |
| Takamiyama | 髙見山 | Original name of the founder of Takasago stable (Takasago Uragorō), since inherited by wrestlers of this stable. |

=== Inspired by patrons ===
| Shikona | | Origins and observations |
| Rōmaji transliteration | Japanese | Origins and observations |
|---|---|---|
| Futabayama | 双葉山 | Inspired by the name of one of his patrons (Futaba). |
| Yoshibayama | 吉葉山 | Inspired by the names of doctors who operated on them (Shosaku Yoshiba, Wasaburo Maeda). |
| Maedayama | 前田山 | Inspired by the names of doctors who operated on them (Shosaku Yoshiba, Wasaburo Maeda). |

=== Other inspirations ===
| Shikona | | Origins and observations |
| Rōmaji transliteration | Japanese | Origins and observations |
|---|---|---|
| Moriurara | 森麗 | Ring name of former Morikawa of Ōtake stable, chosen after he suffered a string of 38 consecutive losses to link him to the horse Haru Urara, also known for her long string of consecutive losses. |
| Asahanshin Torakichi | 朝阪神 虎吉 | Ring name chosen by the wrestler to evoke the Hanshin Tigers baseball team in his native Osaka, with both the Hanshin (阪神) part of his surname and the kanji for tiger (虎) in his given name. |

== See also ==
- Glossary of sumo terms
- Japanese name
- Alter ego
- Art name
- Yagō
- Gyōji
- Yobidashi
- Tokoyama
