= Kotomitsuki Keiji =

Japanese sumo wrestler

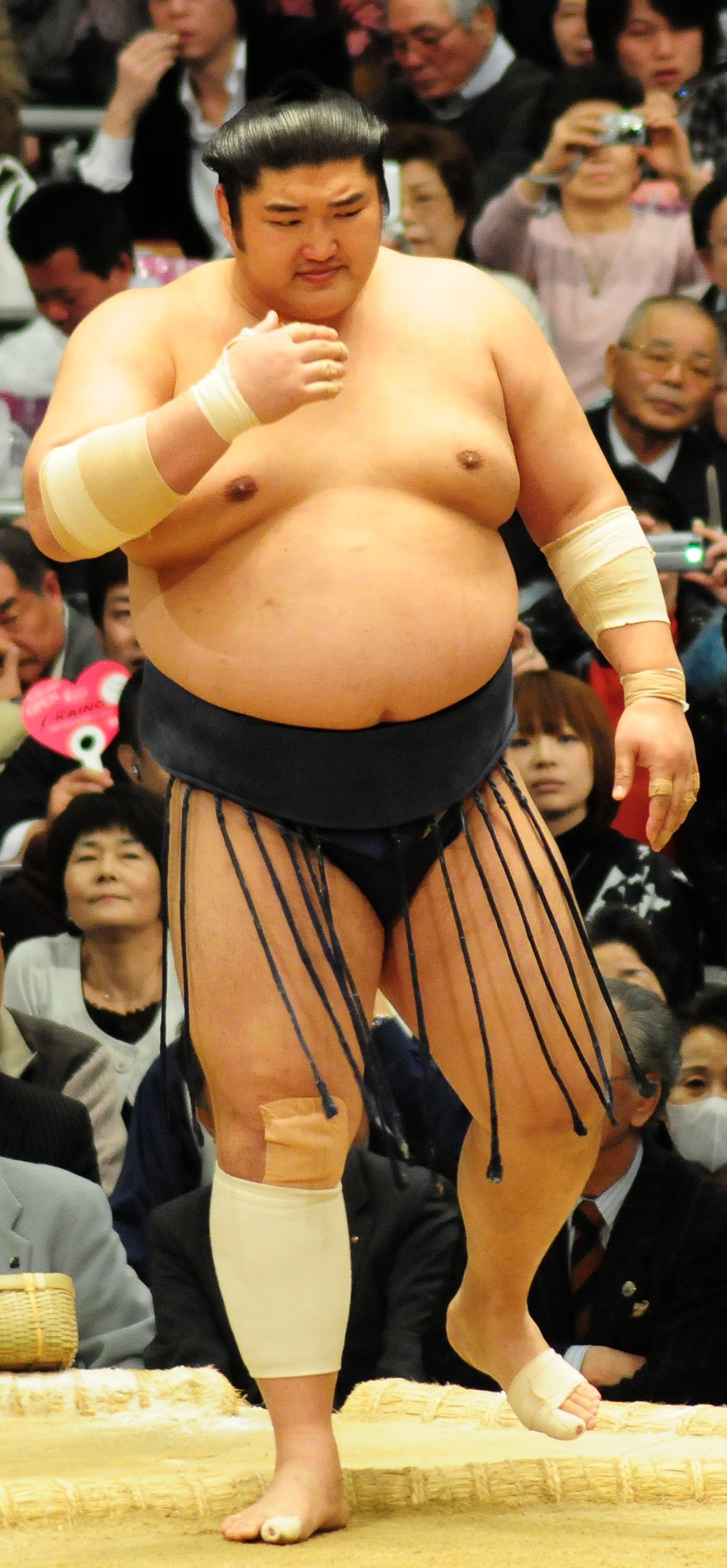
- Kotomitsuki in March 2009

Personal information
- Native name: 琴光喜 啓司
- Born: Keiji Tamiya; April 11, 1976 (age 50) Aichi, Japan
- Height: 1.82 m (5 ft 11 1/2 in)
- Weight: 154 kg (340 lb)

Sport
- Sport: Sumo
- University team: Nihon University
- Retired: July 2010
- Heya: Sadogatake
- Record: 571–367–50
- Debut: March 1999
- Highest rank: Ōzeki (September 2007)
- Championships: 1 (Makuuchi); 1 (Jūryō); 1 (Makushita)
- Special Prizes: Outstanding Performance (2); Fighting Spirit (4); Technique (7)
- Gold Stars: 3 (Musashimaru)
- Updated on November 2010

Kotomitsuki Keiji (琴光喜 啓司; born April 11, 1976 as Keiji Tamiya (田宮 啓司)) is a Japanese former professional sumo wrestler from Okazaki City. A former amateur champion, he turned professional in 1999. He reached the top makuuchi division in November 2000 and won one yūshō or tournament championship, in September 2001. He was a runner-up in eight other tournaments, and earned thirteen sanshō or special prizes. He is one of six wrestlers in the history of sumo to receive all three sanshō in the same tournament, accomplishing the feat in the November 2000 honbasho. After a record 22 tournaments at sekiwake, he achieved promotion to sumo's second highest rank of ōzeki in July 2007 upon winning 35 out of 45 bouts in three consecutive tournaments. This made him at 31 the oldest man to reach ōzeki in the modern era. He wrestled for Sadogatake stable. On July 4, 2010, he was expelled from professional sumo by the Japan Sumo Association for his involvement in an illegal gambling ring.

== Early career ==
Kotomitsuki is a graduate from Tottori Jōhoku High School and had an extremely successful college sumo career, winning a record 27 amateur national titles while at Nihon University. He made his professional debut in March 1999. Because of his achievements as an amateur, he was given makushita tsukedashi status and allowed to leapfrog the lower divisions. Initially fighting under the shikona of Kototamiya, adapted from his own surname, he adopted the name of Kotomitsuki upon reaching the jūryō division in November 1999. He was promoted to the top makuuchi division in May 2000 but missed the entire tournament through injury. On his proper debut three tournaments later, he was runner-up to yokozuna Akebono with an outstanding 13–2 record. He was awarded all three special prizes on offer; a rare achievement. He was immediately promoted to sekiwake.

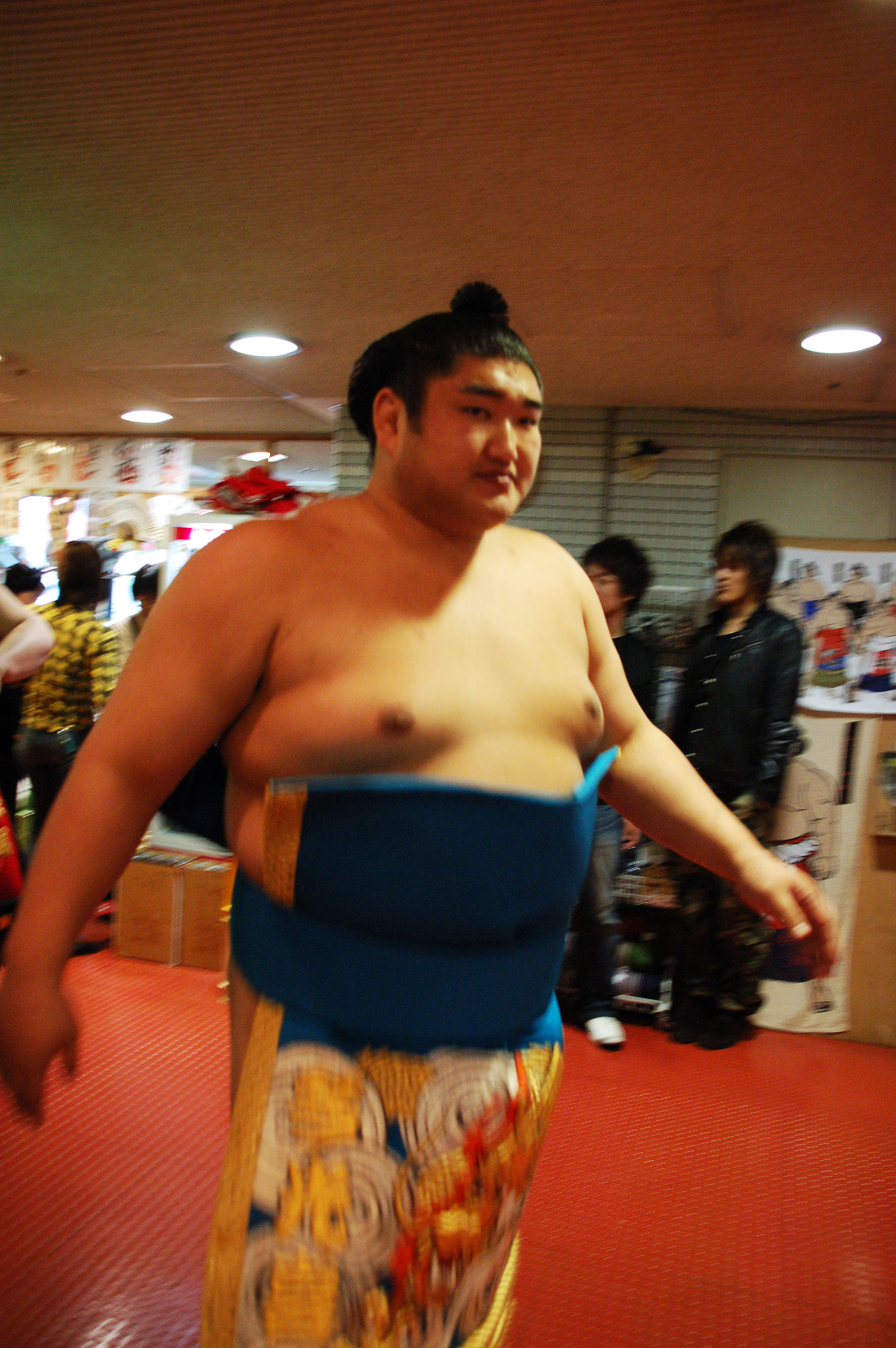
Kotomitsuki in March 2006

Kotomitsuki took his only top division yūshō or championship in September 2001, whilst ranked as a maegashira. He won with a 13–2 record in a tournament that saw only one ōzeki and one yokozuna complete all 15 days. He finished in third place with a strong 12–3 score in January 2002 but suffered a broken jaw on the 14th day of the Osaka tournament in March, which required surgery and forced him to miss the following tournament in May. Due to his stablemaster not submitting the paperwork in time, he failed to get public injury status and fell back to the maegashira ranks. He recovered to produce another runner-up performance in September 2002, and was also runner-up in September 2003 and January 2004, each time from a maegashira position.

Kotomitsuki holds the record for most tournaments spent at sekiwake in the modern era. Although he could only manage four wins at his first attempt at sekiwake, he was ranked there for 22 tournaments in total, including eleven in a row from November 2005 to July 2007. For much of that time he was consistent rather than spectacular, posting a succession of 8–7 scores in 2006.

== Promotion to ōzeki ==
In May 2007 ōzeki Tochiazuma retired, and Hakuhō was promoted to yokozuna. This meant that there were now only three ōzeki rather than five, and Kotomitsuki was once again a strong candidate for promotion. He followed up a 10–5 record in March with a 12–3 score and runner-up honours in May (his first jun-yusho in over two years), with the Sumo Association's chairman Kitanoumi indicating that 12 wins in the following tournament would be enough to clinch ōzeki promotion. In July 2007 Kotomitsuki produced a 13–2 score, defeating west yokozuna Hakuhō and once again finishing runner-up, this time to east yokozuna Asashōryū. He lost to Kisenosato on the final day, missing the chance of a playoff for the championship with Asashōryū and the first yūshō for a Japanese born wrestler since January 2006.

Kotomitsuki's ōzeki promotion, confirmed on 25 July 2007, was of special significance to Kotomitsuki and the Sadogatake-beya. Having missed qualifying in 2002 due to a combination of injuries and bad timing, Kotomitsuki was seen by detractors as having insufficient will and being slightly advanced in age to attain ōzeki status. For comparison, Tochiazuma who reached ōzeki in 2002 is Kotomitsuki's junior by 7 months. At the age of 31 years 3 months, Kotomitsuki proved the naysayers wrong, becoming the oldest wrestler to attain the rank in the modern era.

== Ōzeki career ==
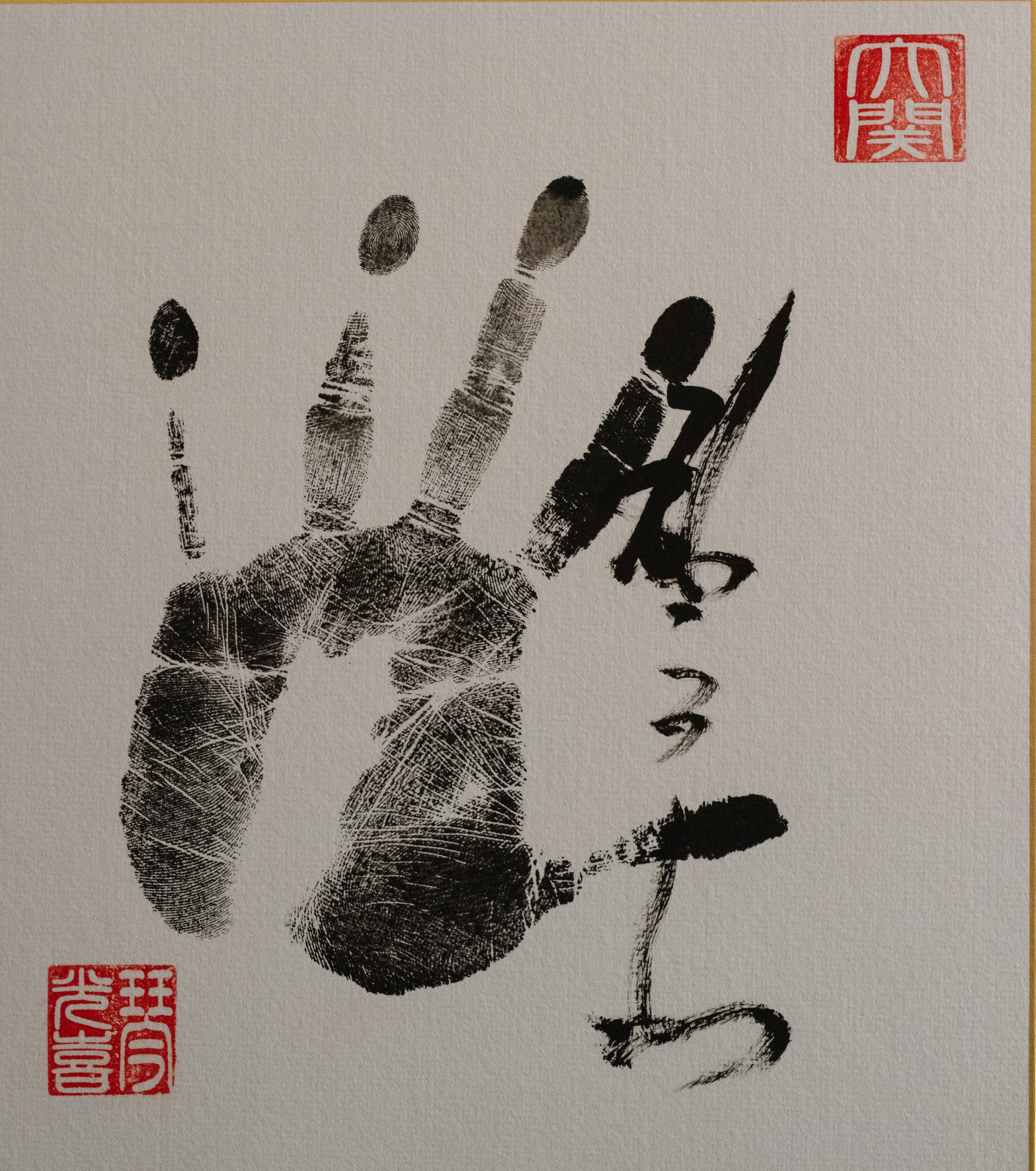
Kotomitsuki tegata (handprint & signature)

Kotomitsuki scored a respectable ten wins on his ōzeki debut in September 2007, but at the end of 2007 he underwent surgery to remove gallstones. He was not at his best in the 2008 New Year tournament but won his eighth bout on the final day to achieve a kachi-koshi or winning score. He produced another unremarkable 8–7 mark in March, but did manage to end his 28 consecutive defeats against his nemesis Asashōryū. In July 2008, in his "home" tournament in Nagoya, he finished as runner-up to Hakuhō on 11–4, the eighth and final time in his career he was a tournament runner-up (and his only as an ōzeki). He matched this score in September, although he finished in third place behind Hakuhō and Ama.

Entering the January 2009 tournament with a gout problem in his right ankle, Kotomitsuki took his first make-koshi or losing record as an ōzeki, breaking a run of twenty consecutive kachi-koshi scores. On Day 12 he was forced to pull out of the tournament, leaving him kadoban (in danger of demotion from ōzeki) for the first time. He secured the necessary number of wins in the following tournament in March, which included another victory over Asashōryū. In July 2009 he defeated Hakuhō and finished in third place with a fine 12–3 score – the last time he was to win more than ten bouts in a tournament. He won his first seven matches in September, the best start in his ōzeki career, but then faded in the second week and finished on 9–6. After a mediocre 8–7 in November, he pulled out on the 8th day of the January 2010 tournament with only one win, citing injuries to his left knee and foot. He held his ōzeki rank with a 9–6 score in March.

=== Gambling scandal and dismissal ===
In May 2010, Kotomitsuki faced allegations of gambling on professional baseball, which is illegal in Japan. He initially denied the claims, which were reported in the tabloid magazine Shukan Shincho. The Sumo Association launched an investigation, and in June he changed his position and admitted in a survey (along with 29 others in the sumo world) that he did indeed bet on baseball games. His stablemaster said Kotomitsuki would sit out the forthcoming Nagoya tournament. Sumo Association official Hakkaku Oyakata said he felt "betrayed" by Kotomitsuki. He was questioned by the Tokyo Metropolitan Police Department on May 22, and his subsequent confession was also reported to the authorities. The head of the Sumo Association Musashigawa Oyakata said that Kotomitsuki had received threats to himself and his family, "and that's why he couldn't (initially) admit he'd been gambling." It emerged that Kotomitsuki had paid 3.5 million yen in "hush money" in December to a former wrestler, Mitsutomo Furuichi, whose brother (an active rikishi) and a tokoyama from Onomatsu stable had acted as intermediaries to collect Kotomitsuki's winnings. Furuichi, who was allegedly accompanied by a member of the Yamaguchi-gumi crime syndicate, then demanded more money from Kotomitsuki the following month, saying that the gang had wanted 100 million yen. Furuichi was subsequently arrested on extortion charges.

On July 4, Kotomitsuki (along with stablemaster Ōtake oyakata) was expelled from sumo, but Kotomitsuki did receive the severance pay to which he was entitled. Despite the fact that he had already been expelled, the following tournament's rankings still had Kotomitsuki's name on the list. The Sumo Association explained there was no time to correct the print, and the resulting 0–0–15 score was not counted in his overall career record.

On September 13, Kotomitsuki filed an injunction with the Tokyo District Court seeking his re-instatement to sumo, arguing that he had not been given a full explanation for his dismissal and that he was made an unfair example by the Sumo Association in comparison with the lighter punishment given to all the other wrestlers who admitted gambling (a one-tournament suspension). On November 30 a group of fans calling themselves "Save Kotomitsuki" handed in a petition with 58,000 signatures to the Sumo Association asking that he either be re-instated or that his expulsion be revised to a retirement, allowing him to remain in the Association as an elder.

In March 2011, prosecutors announced that Kotomitsuki, Ōtake and 25 others would not be indicted on gambling due to lack of implicating evidence. Kotomitsuki announced on 16 April that he was suing the Sumo Association for wrongful dismissal. In October, Furuichi was found guilty of extortion and sentenced to four and a half years in prison.

== Post-sumo activities ==
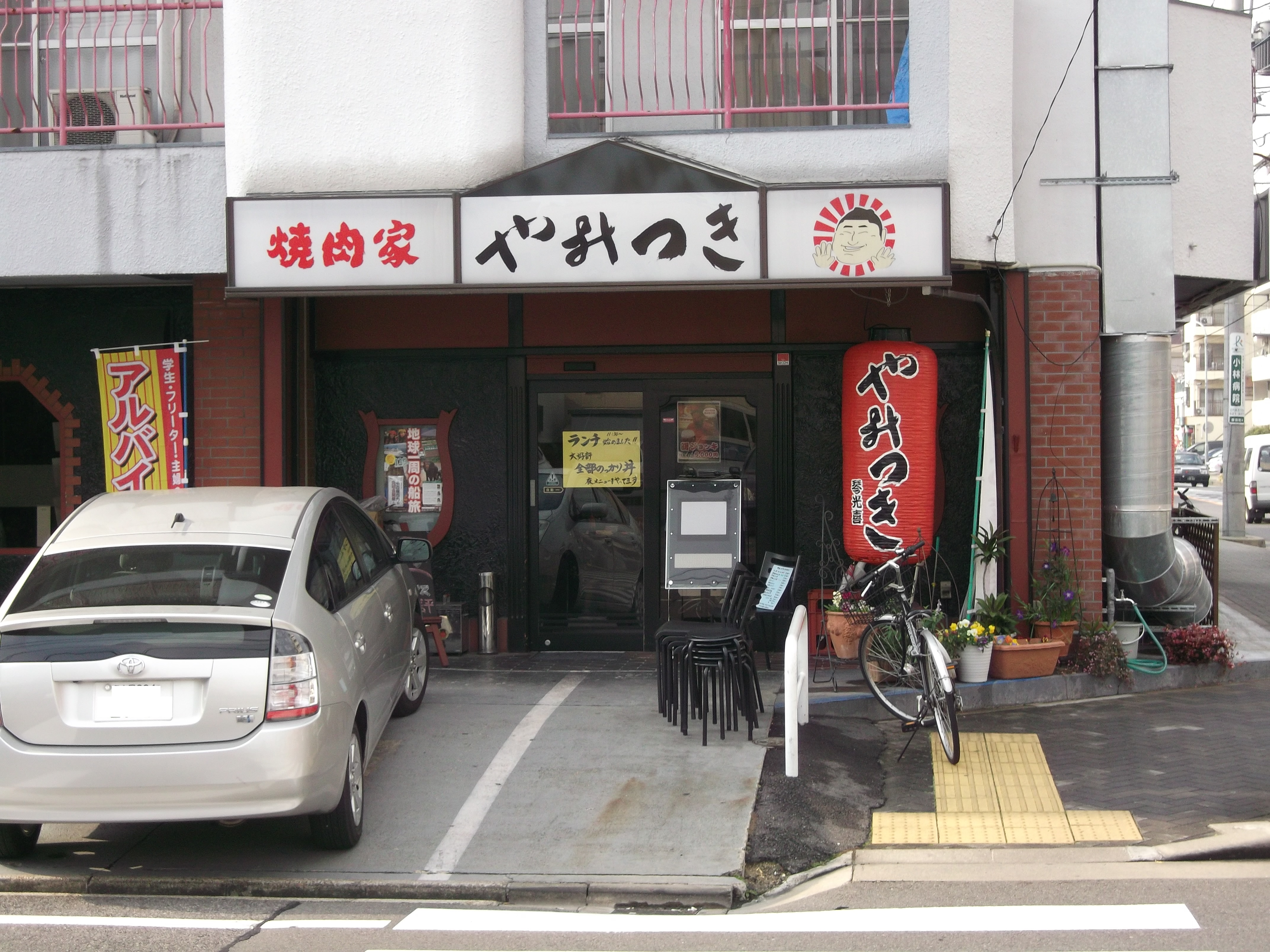
Kotomitsuki's restaurant, Yamitsuki

In April 2012, Kotomitsuki opened a yakiniku restaurant in Nagoya's Nishi Ward, called Yamitsuki (やみつき). Though his lawsuit was still ongoing at the time, he told reporters, "The reality is I won't be reinstated as a wrestler. I would have loved to have become a coach of a sumo stable and train my own wrestlers, but that's impossible now." He was encouraged after struggling with depression to open the restaurant by his fellow dismissed wrestler Takatoriki, who also has an eatery.

In December 2013, Kotomitsuki was arrested for allegedly employing non-Japanese without valid visas at his restaurant.

With his final appeal dismissed, in February 2015 the former Kotomitsuki symbolically accepted his life in sumo was over by having an unofficial danpatsu-shiki, or hair-cutting ceremony, at the Hotel Metropolitan Tokyo. Among the 350 guests were all three active yokozuna, oyakata Takanohana, and his former stablemate Kotoshōgiku.

On New Year's Eve 2017 he took part in a sumo exhibition event streamed online by AbemaTV, challenging Asashōryū.

== Fighting style ==
Kotomitsuki was a yotsu-sumo wrestler, and his favourite grip on the mawashi was migi-yotsu, with his left hand outside and right hand inside his opponent's arms (although he was also capable of fighting in the reverse position, hidari-yotsu). His most common winning kimarite by far was yori-kiri, the force out, followed by oshi-dashi (push out) and hataki-komi (slap down). He was fond of dashinage (pulling throws, both overarm and underarm), and was also one of the few rikishi to employ uchi-muso, a technique which involves tapping the opponent's inner thigh with the back of the hand to off-balance him, before twisting him down.

== Family ==
Shortly before the September 2008 tournament Kotomitsuki announced his engagement, to a former hospital worker from Aichi Prefecture whom he had known since 1999. They married in October and the wedding ceremony was held in April 2009.

Kotomitsuki's eldest son, Aiki Tamiya, is seeking to follow in his father's footsteps and enter the world of sumo. In April 2021 he moved from his parents' home in Inazawa to Saitama Prefecture and started classes at Saitama Sakae High School, a school known for producing a number of professional sumo wrestlers. In August 2023, Tamiya won at the National Junior High School Athletic Championships to earn the title of Junior Yokozuna.

== Career record ==
Kotomitsuki Keiji
Year	January Hatsu basho, Tokyo	March Haru basho, Osaka	May Natsu basho, Tokyo	July Nagoya basho, Nagoya	September Aki basho, Tokyo	November Kyūshū basho, Fukuoka
1999	x	Makushita tsukedashi #60; 5–2	East Makushita #44; 6–1	West Makushita #20; 7–0; Champion	West Makushita #1; 5–2	East Jūryō #12; 9–6
2000	East Jūryō #7; 11–4	West Jūryō #1; 13–2–P	East Maegashira #8; Sat out due to injury 0–0–15	West Jūryō #6; 9–6	East Jūryō #4; 14–1; Champion	West Maegashira #9; 13–2; FOT★
2001	West Sekiwake #1; 4–11	West Maegashira #3; 10–5; T★	East Komusubi #1; 9–6; T	West Sekiwake #1; 6–9	East Maegashira #2; 13–2; OT★	West Sekiwake #1; 9–6
2002	East Sekiwake #1; 12–3; T	East Sekiwake #1; 8–7	West Sekiwake #1; Sat out due to injury 0–0–15	West Maegashira #6; 7–8	East Maegashira #7; 12–3; F	West Sekiwake #1; 8–7
2003	West Sekiwake #1; 9–6	West Sekiwake #1; 6–9	East Maegashira #2; 0–5–10	East Maegashira #13; 9–6	East Maegashira #6; 11–4	West Maegashira #1; 6–9
2004	West Maegashira #4; 13–2; F	West Sekiwake #1; 7–8	West Komusubi #1; 9–6	East Komusubi #1; 7–8	West Komusubi #1; 8–7	East Komusubi #1; 10–5
2005	East Komusubi #1; 7–8	East Maegashira #2; 9–6	East Komusubi #1; 13–2; T	West Sekiwake #1; 7–8	East Komusubi #1; 9–6	West Sekiwake #1; 8–7
2006	East Sekiwake #1; 8–7	West Sekiwake #1; 8–7	East Sekiwake #1; 8–7	West Sekiwake #1; 8–7	West Sekiwake #1; 8–7	West Sekiwake #1; 9–6
2007	East Sekiwake #1; 8–7	East Sekiwake #1; 10–5	East Sekiwake #1; 12–3	East Sekiwake #1; 13–2; FT	West Ōzeki #2; 10–5	East Ōzeki #1; 10–5
2008	West Ōzeki #1; 8–7	West Ōzeki #1; 8–7	East Ōzeki #1; 8–7	West Ōzeki #1; 11–4	East Ōzeki #1; 11–4	East Ōzeki #1; 9–6
2009	East Ōzeki #1; 2–10–3	East Ōzeki #3; 8–7	West Ōzeki #2; 8–7	West Ōzeki #2; 12–3	West Ōzeki #1; 9–6	West Ōzeki #1; 8–7
2010	East Ōzeki #2; 1–7–7	West Ōzeki #2; 9–6	East Ōzeki #2; 9–6	Dismissed	x	x
Record given as wins–losses–absences Top division champion Top division runner-up Retired Lower divisions Non-participation Sanshō key: F=Fighting spirit; O=Outstanding performance; T=Technique Also shown: ★=Kinboshi; P=Playoff(s); Divisions: Makuuchi — Jūryō — Makushita — Sandanme — Jonidan — Jonokuchi Makuuchi ranks: Yokozuna — Ōzeki — Sekiwake — Komusubi — Maegashira

== See also ==
- List of sumo tournament top division champions
- List of sumo tournament top division runners-up
- List of sumo tournament second division champions
- Glossary of sumo terms
- List of past sumo wrestlers
- List of ōzeki
