= Kotonowaka Terumasa =

Japanese former sumo wrestler

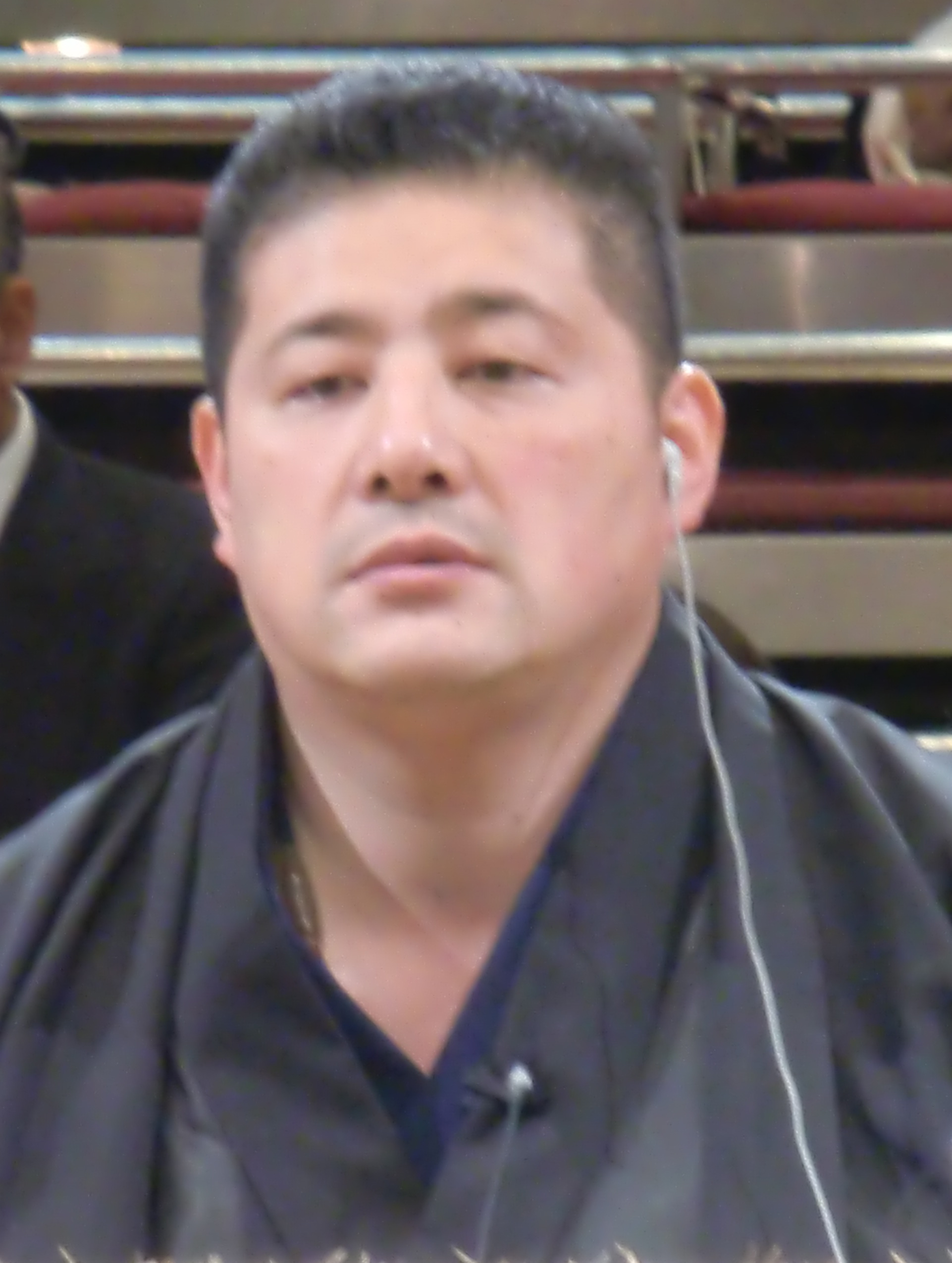

Personal information
- Native name: 琴ノ若 晴將
- Born: Mitsuya Konno; May 15, 1968 (age 58) Obanazawa, Yamagata, Japan
- Height: 1.91 m (6 ft 3 in)
- Weight: 181 kg (399 lb)

Sport
- Sport: Sumo
- Retired: November, 2005
- Heya: Sadogatake
- Record: 785-764-100
- Debut: May, 1984
- Highest rank: Sekiwake (January, 1999)
- Elder name: Sadogatake
- Championships: 2 (Sandanme)
- Special Prizes: Outstanding Performance (2); Fighting Spirit (5)
- Gold Stars: 8 Takanohana II (3); Wakanohana III (2); Asashōryū (2); Akebono
- Updated on July 2007

Kotonowaka Terumasa (Japanese: 琴ノ若 晴將; born May 15, 1968, as Konno Mitsuya (鎌谷 今野, Mitsuya Konno)) is a Japanese former sumo wrestler from Obanazawa. He made his professional debut in 1984 and after reaching the top makuuchi division in 1990, he remained there for 15 years until his retirement in 2005. His highest rank was sekiwake and he earned seven special prizes and eight gold stars during his long makuuchi career. He is now the head coach of Sadogatake stable.

== Career ==
At junior high school, he practiced judo and shot put, and even represented his prefecture at the All Tohoku Shot Put Championships. He was already 1.87 m (6 ft 1 1/2 in) tall by the age of 14. He was scouted into sumo by a supporter of Sadogatake stable. He had intended to join in March 1984 alongside Kotonishiki, but failed the physical because of high blood pressure, delaying his entry by two months.

At first, he wrestled under the name Imano and then Kotokonno, before finally settling on Kotonowaka in 1988. It took him six years to achieve sekitori status by reaching the jūryō division in July 1990. He first reached makuuchi in November 1990 and remained continuously in the top division from March 1991. He advanced several times into the san'yaku ranks, first making komusubi in September 1993. However, he had to wait until January 1999 to achieve his highest rank of sekiwake, following a strong 10-5 showing at komusubi the previous November.

Kotonowaka never won a tournament, but he nevertheless earned eight kinboshi or gold stars for victories against yokozuna while a maegashira, with three such wins coming against Takanohana. He defeated Asashoryu twice as a yokozuna, and also looked to have defeated him in July 2004, but the judges controversially called for a rematch after deciding that Asashoryu had in fact not hit the ground before Kotonowaka touched down. Kotonowaka lost the rematch, but NHK received calls from viewers saying that Asashoryu was shini-tai ("dead body") and should have lost the first bout. He also received five Fighting Spirit and two Outstanding Achievement prizes in the course of his long career, the first coming in July 1995, nearly five years after his top division debut. He was ranked in the top division for 90 tournaments, which is the eighth best in history, and he was one of only a handful of wrestlers to win over 600 top division bouts. He was relatively injury-free until March 2000, when he suffered a serious injury to his left knee in training which was to bother him for the rest of his career. He injured the knee again in November 2003 and was the last wrestler to be able to take advantage of the kosho seido (public injury) system before its abolition, sitting out the January 2004 tournament without affecting his ranking.

His good looks meant he was popular with female sumo fans.

== Fighting style ==
Kotonowaka relied strongly on countering techniques against his opponents, and his bouts were often relatively long as compared to most other wrestlers. This proclivity led to him receiving the nickname "Mr. Ippun" ("Mr. One-Minute"). He favoured a migi-yotsu (left hand outside, right hand inside) grip on his opponent's mawashi. His speciality was uwatenage, or the overarm throw, which he used to win over 20 percent of his matches (the average is only 7 percent).

== Retirement from sumo ==
During the 2005 November tournament, in which, at 37, he was the oldest rikishi in his division, he announced his retirement. He took over immediately as stable master of Sadogatake stable, as the previous head, former yokozuna Kotozakura, had reached the mandatory retirement age of 65. Kotonowaka had been in line to inherit the stable ever since he had married Kotozakura's daughter in March 1996, and changed his legal name from Mitsuya Konno to Mitsuya Kamatani.

Kotonowaka oversaw the promotion of Kotomitsuki to ōzeki in July 2007, and Kotoōshū's first top division championship in May 2008. The first wrestler from his stable to be promoted to the top division since he took over was Kotokasuga, also in May 2008. He produced his first new sekitori, Kotokuni, in January 2009, followed by Kotoyutaka in July 2009, although neither were able to maintain a position in jūryō .

In July 2010, Kotomitsuki was dismissed from sumo for illegal betting on professional baseball, and Sadogatake was punished for his lack of supervision of his top wrestler by being demoted two ranks in the Japan Sumo Association's hierarchy.

In 2011, Sadogatake saw Kotoyūki reach the sekitori ranks, and Kotoshōgiku was promoted to ōzeki, the first Japanese wrestler to reach the rank since Kotomitsuki. Kotoyūki became his first makuuchi debutant in January 2013. Since then, Kotoekō, Kotoshōhō and his own son, then known as Kotonowaka, have reached makuuchi. His son was promoted to the rank of ōzeki, after winning 33 matches at the sekiwake rank between September 2023 and January 2024.

In March 2022, Sadogatake was elected to the Japan Sumo Association's board of directors. In January 2023, he took over as the head of the judging department following the resignation of Isegahama.

== Family ==
Kotonowaka's son Masakatsu Kamatani was born in November 1997, and in November 2015, joined Sadogatake stable, using the fighting name Kotokamatani. He won the jonokuchi championship in January 2016 and reached the makushita division in September 2016. Following the May 2019 tournament, he was promoted to the second jūryō division, adopting his father's shikona "Kotonowaka". It was understood that he would inherit his grandfather's shikona of Kotozakura when he reached the ōzeki rank. At the Haru 2024 basho, ōzeki Kotonowaka achieved kachi-koshi with his 8th win on Day 10, avoiding kadoban and ensuring that he would proceed with the name change to Kotozakura before the start of the May tournament.

== Career record ==
Kotonowaka Terumasa
Year	January Hatsu basho, Tokyo	March Haru basho, Osaka	May Natsu basho, Tokyo	July Nagoya basho, Nagoya	September Aki basho, Tokyo	November Kyūshū basho, Fukuoka
1984	x	x	(Maezumo)	West Jonokuchi #47; 6–1	West Jonidan #99; 4–3	West Jonidan #67; 3–4
1985	West Jonidan #84; 2–5	East Jonidan #106; 5–2	West Jonidan #72; 3–4	East Jonidan #90; 6–1	West Jonidan #22; 4–3	West Jonidan #4; 6–1
1986	East Sandanme #49; 2–5	East Sandanme #81; 4–3	West Sandanme #59; 2–5	West Sandanme #97; 6–1	East Sandanme #39; 3–4	West Sandanme #51; 5–2
1987	East Sandanme #23; 6–1	East Makushita #47; 2–5	East Sandanme #12; 7–0; Champion	East Makushita #15; 3–4	West Makushita #19; 4–3	East Makushita #12; 3–4
1988	West Makushita #19; 3–4	East Makushita #27; 3–4	West Makushita #35; 5–2	East Makushita #23; 3–4	West Makushita #35; Sat out due to injury 0–0–7	East Sandanme #16; 6–1
1989	East Makushita #43; 5–2	West Makushita #26; 1–1–5	East Makushita #55; 4–3	West Makushita #41; 1–2–4	West Sandanme #13; 7–0–P; Champion	East Makushita #13; 3–4
1990	West Makushita #20; 6–1	East Makushita #7; 5–2	West Makushita #2; 6–1–P	West Jūryō #11; 9–6	West Jūryō #6; 11–4–P	West Maegashira #14; 7–8
1991	East Jūryō #1; 10–5	West Maegashira #14; 9–6	East Maegashira #11; 8–7	East Maegashira #8; 8–7	West Maegashira #6; 7–8	East Maegashira #8; 7–8
1992	West Maegashira #9; 7–8	East Maegashira #11; 7–8	West Maegashira #12; 8–7	East Maegashira #10; 8–7	East Maegashira #4; 7–8	East Maegashira #6; 7–8
1993	West Maegashira #8; 6–9	West Maegashira #12; 9–6	West Maegashira #7; 8–7	West Maegashira #2; 8–7	West Komusubi #1; 8–7	East Komusubi #1; 7–8
1994	East Maegashira #1; 6–9	East Maegashira #3; 7–8	West Maegashira #3; 5–10	East Maegashira #7; 8–7	West Maegashira #1; 7–8	East Maegashira #2; 8–7
1995	East Maegashira #1; 5–10	East Maegashira #4; 7–8	East Maegashira #5; 9–6	West Komusubi #1; 9–6; F	East Komusubi #1; 4–11	West Maegashira #3; 8–7
1996	East Maegashira #2; 5–10	West Maegashira #4; 11–4; F	East Komusubi #1; 5–10	East Maegashira #2; 9–6; O★★	West Komusubi #1; 4–11	West Maegashira #3; 5–10
1997	West Maegashira #6; 8–7	West Maegashira #1; 2–10–3 ★	West Maegashira #10; 8–7	West Maegashira #4; 6–9	West Maegashira #6; 6–9	East Maegashira #8; 9–6
1998	West Maegashira #3; 7–8	East Maegashira #4; 8–7	East Maegashira #3; 4–11	West Maegashira #9; 11–4; F	East Maegashira #2; 9–6; O★	West Komusubi #2; 10–5
1999	West Sekiwake #1; 8–7	West Sekiwake #1; 6–9	West Maegashira #1; 2–13	East Maegashira #10; 9–6	West Maegashira #4; 7–8 ★	East Maegashira #5; 8–7
2000	East Maegashira #2; 6–9 ★	West Maegashira #3; Sat out due to injury 0–0–15	West Maegashira #14; 10–5	East Maegashira #7; 8–7	West Maegashira #6; 7–8	East Maegashira #7; 8–7
2001	East Maegashira #2; 5–10	West Maegashira #6; 6–9	West Maegashira #8; 9–6	East Maegashira #2; 8–7	East Maegashira #1; 7–8	East Maegashira #4; 7–8
2002	West Maegashira #5; 8–7	West Maegashira #2; 4–11	East Maegashira #6; 9–6	West Maegashira #1; 2–9–4	East Maegashira #9; Sat out due to injury 0–0–15	East Maegashira #9; 10–5
2003	East Maegashira #3; 7–8	West Maegashira #3; 7–8 ★	West Maegashira #4; 10–5	West Maegashira #2; 1–2–12 ★	East Maegashira #12; Sat out due to injury 0–0–15	East Maegashira #12; 7–3–5
2004	East Maegashira #13; Sat out due to injury 0–0–15	East Maegashira #13; 11–4; F	East Maegashira #5; 8–7	West Maegashira #2; 3–12	East Maegashira #9; 10–5; F	West Maegashira #5; 9–6
2005	East Maegashira #2; 4–11	East Maegashira #9; 8–7	East Maegashira #8; 8–7	East Maegashira #7; 4–11	East Maegashira #13; 8–7	West Maegashira #11; Retired; 5–9
Record given as wins–losses–absences Top division champion Top division runner-up Retired Lower divisions Non-participation Sanshō key: F=Fighting spirit; O=Outstanding performance; T=Technique Also shown: ★=Kinboshi; P=Playoff(s); Divisions: Makuuchi — Jūryō — Makushita — Sandanme — Jonidan — Jonokuchi Makuuchi ranks: Yokozuna — Ōzeki — Sekiwake — Komusubi — Maegashira

== See also ==
- Glossary of sumo terms
- List of past sumo wrestlers
- List of sumo elders
- List of sumo record holders
- List of sekiwake
