= Hitachiiwa Eitarō =

Japanese sumo wrestler

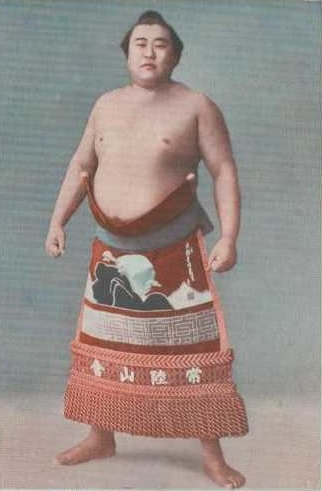

Personal information
- Native name: 常陸岩英太郎
- Born: Eitaro Sakurai; March 9, 1900 Tokyo, Japan
- Died: September 21, 1957 (aged 57)
- Height: 1.73 m (5 ft 8 in)
- Weight: 115 kg (254 lb)

Sport
- Sport: Sumo
- Retired: March 1931
- Heya: Dewanoumi
- Record: 147-74-47-3draws-3holds (Makuuchi)
- Debut: May 1917
- Highest rank: Ōzeki (May 1927)
- Elder name: Sakaigawa
- Championships: 1 (Makuuchi); 1 (Jūryō)
- Updated on June 25, 2020

Hitachiiwa Eitarō (Japanese: 常陸岩英太郎; March 9, 1900 – September 21, 1957) was a Japanese professional sumo wrestler from Tokyo. His highest rank was ōzeki.

== Career ==
Born Eitaro Sakurai (櫻井 英太郎) in Chuo, Tokyo, he joined Dewanoumi stable and was coached by former yokozuna Hitachiyama. He made his debut in May 1917, and was promoted to the jūryō division in May 1922. After winning the jūryō division championship in January 1923 he reached the top makuuchi division in May 1923. In January 1926, at the rank of maegashira 2, he finished as runner-up to yokozuna Tsunenohana with a fine 10–1 record. His earned him promotion to sekiwake, and after two more runner-up performances he was promoted to ōzeki in May 1927.

In January 1928, he won his only top division yūshō, or championship, but it caused great controversy. On Day 10, he scored a win by default (fusensho) against Nishinoumi Kajirō III, who was a no-show for the bout. His rival for the championship, veteran maegashira and former sekiwake Misugiiso, had won all his bouts in actual fights but was then defeated by strong komusubi Tamanishiki (later yokozuna) on the 11th day. At the end of the tournament they both had 10–1 records, as Hitachiiwa had defeated yokozuna Miyagiyama on the final day. Hitachiiwa and Misugiiso were too far apart in rank to have been paired against each other during the tournament, and as there was no playoff system in place at that time, Hitachiiwa, in the higher ōzeki rank was awarded the yūshō. Many people sympathized with Misugiiso as it had cost him his only chance to win a championship. Misugiiso was only able to win two more bouts in his career and retired a year later.

The controversy gathered around the system of keeping score for matches won by default as one wrestler does not appear for their scheduled fight (fusensho). At the time, only in the last two days of a tournament could a win by default be accepted, and there was no formal announcement (kachi-nanori) of the winner by default, so both wrestlers would be scored as not appearing for the match. In the following tournament in March 1928, the modern system was established where the winner by default was officially scored as a win and not a no-show, as it was in the past.

Hitachiiwa fell ill after the dispute and was unable to capitalise on his win, sitting out the March 1928 tournament. He was unable to record consistently good results in his following career and was never in contention for another championship. He retired in March 1931. He remained in the sumo world as an elder, under the name Sakaigawa (境川), and worked as a coach in Dewanoumi stable until his death.

== Career record ==
- In 1927 Tokyo and Osaka sumo merged and four tournaments a year in Tokyo and other locations began to be held.

Hitachiiwa Eitarō
-	Spring Haru basho, varied	Summer Natsu basho, varied
1917	(Maezumo)	Shinjo; 2–1
1918	East Jonokuchi #11; 3–2	West Jonidan #62; 2–3
1919	East Jonidan #60; 5–0	East Sandanme #50; 3–2
1920	West Sandanme #31; 4–1	West Makushita #50; 3–2
1921	East Makushita #27; 4–1	West Makushita #5; 2–3
1922	East Makushita #14; 4–1	East Jūryō #10; 3–2
1923	East Jūryō #6; 8–1; Champion	West Maegashira #16; 7–4
1924	West Maegashira #4; 5–3; 1d	East Maegashira #2; 7–3; 1h
1925	East Maegashira #1; 6–2; 1d 2h	West Sekiwake #1; 0–0–11
1926	West Maegashira #2; 10–1	East Sekiwake #1; 7–4
Record given as wins–losses–absences Top division champion Top division runner-up Retired Lower divisions Non-participation Sanshō key: F=Fighting spirit; O=Outstanding performance; T=Technique Also shown: ★=Kinboshi; P=Playoff(s); Divisions: Makuuchi — Jūryō — Makushita — Sandanme — Jonidan — Jonokuchi Makuuchi ranks: Yokozuna — Ōzeki — Sekiwake — Komusubi — Maegashira

-	Spring Haru basho, Tokyo	March Sangatsu basho, varied	Summer Natsu basho, Tokyo	October Jūgatsu basho, varied
1927	West Sekiwake #1; 9–2	West Sekiwake #1; 9–2	West Ōzeki #1; 7–4	East Ōzeki #2; 8–2; 1d
1928	East Ōzeki #1; 10–1	West Ōzeki #1; 0–0–11	West Ōzeki #1; 4–4–3	West Ōzeki #1; 8–3
1929	East Ōzeki #1; 5–6	East Ōzeki #1; 7–4	East Ōzeki #1; 8–3	East Ōzeki #1; 3–3–5
1930	East Ōzeki #2; 3–3–5	East Ōzeki #2; 8–3	East Ōzeki #2; 5–6	East Ōzeki #2; 6–5
1931	West Ōzeki #2; 5–6	West Ōzeki #2; Retired; 0–0–11	x	x
Record given as win-loss-absent Top Division Champion Top Division Runner-up Retired Lower Divisions Key:d=Draw(s) (引分); h=Hold(s) (預り); Divisions: Makuuchi — Jūryō — Makushita — Sandanme — Jonidan — Jonokuchi Makuuchi ranks: Yokozuna — Ōzeki — Sekiwake — Komusubi — Maegashira

== See also ==
- Glossary of sumo terms
- List of past sumo wrestlers
- List of sumo tournament top division champions
- List of sumo tournament second division champions
- List of ōzeki
