= Yoshinotani Akitoshi =

Japanese sumo wrestler (1949–2000)

Personal information
- Native name: 吉の谷 彰俊
- Born: Sakuri Yoshitani; April 23, 1949 Miiraku, Nagasaki, Japan
- Died: January 14, 2000 (aged 50)
- Height: 1.76 m (5 ft 9 1/2 in)
- Weight: 95 kg (209 lb; 15.0 st)

Sport
- Sport: Sumo
- Retired: May, 1982
- Heya: Dewanoumi
- Record: 461-469-0
- Debut: May, 1965
- Highest rank: Maegashira 4 (September, 1974)
- Elder name: see bio
- Championships: 1 (Jūryō); 2 (Makushita); 1 (Sandanme)
- Updated on June 2020

Yoshinotani Akitoshi (born Sakuri Yoshitani; April 23, 1949 – January 14, 2000) was a sumo wrestler from Miiraku, Nagasaki, Japan. He made his professional debut in May 1965 and reached the top division in January 1974. His shikona was adapted from own surname of Yoshitani after he had previously used Utonoyama. His highest rank was maegashira 4 and he fought in seven top division tournaments, although he struggled with a persistent elbow injury. He was one of the smallest sekitori, weighing less than 100kg for much of his career. He was a contemporary of Washuyama, another small wrestler from Dewanoumi stable. He won the jūryō division championship in September 1973 with an 11–4 record, despite losing his last three matches. In May 1978 he inflicted the first defeat of future ōzeki Asashio's career to secure his majority of wins on the final day of the tournament. His final tournament as a sekitori was in November 1978. He fought in 102 tournaments in total, 27 as a sekitori, with no bouts missed and 930 career matches. Upon retirement from active competition in May 1982 he became an elder in the Japan Sumo Association under a series of different names, since he didn't own a toshiyori-kabu of his own. He died while active as Onaruto-oyakata of multiple organ failure in January 2000, having been ill for several months.

== Career record ==
Yoshinotani Akitoshi
Year	January Hatsu basho, Tokyo	March Haru basho, Osaka	May Natsu basho, Tokyo	July Nagoya basho, Nagoya	September Aki basho, Tokyo	November Kyūshū basho, Fukuoka
1965	x	x	(Maezumo)	West Jonokuchi #22; 4–3	West Jonidan #121; 2–5	East Jonidan #121; 5–2
1966	West Jonidan #67; 4–3	East Jonidan #51; 3–4	West Jonidan #71; 3–4	East Jonidan #81; 4–3	East Jonidan #41; 4–3	West Sandanme #101; 6–1
1967	West Sandanme #56; 3–4	West Sandanme #70; 3–4	West Jonidan #33; 3–4	West Jonidan #43; 4–3	East Jonidan #10; 6–1	East Sandanme #64; 2–5
1968	West Sandanme #84; 3–4	West Sandanme #88; 4–3	West Sandanme #68; 4–3	East Sandanme #54; 3–4	East Sandanme #64; 6–1	West Sandanme #21; 5–2
1969	West Makushita #55; 2–5	East Sandanme #13; 4–3	West Sandanme #6; 2–5	West Sandanme #19; 2–5	East Sandanme #38; 5–2	East Sandanme #13; 3–4
1970	East Sandanme #23; 4–3	West Sandanme #11; 2–5	West Sandanme #30; 7–0; Champion	East Makushita #31; 6–1	West Makushita #11; 3–4	West Makushita #17; 2–5
1971	West Makushita #28; 5–2	East Makushita #16; 5–2	East Makushita #6; 3–4	East Makushita #9; 5–2	East Makushita #3; 3–4	West Makushita #5; 3–4
1972	West Makushita #8; 5–2	East Makushita #3; 4–3	West Jūryō #12; 7–8	West Makushita #1; 4–3	East Jūryō #11; 9–6	West Jūryō #6; 4–11
1973	West Jūryō #12; 10–5	East Jūryō #5; 6–9	West Jūryō #8; 8–7	West Jūryō #5; 7–8	West Jūryō #7; 11–4; Champion	West Jūryō #1; 9–6
1974	West Maegashira #12; 9–6	East Maegashira #8; 5–10	West Maegashira #12; 9–6	West Maegashira #7; 8–7	West Maegashira #4; 7–8	East Maegashira #6; 4–11
1975	West Maegashira #13; 6–9	West Jūryō #2; 3–12	West Jūryō #11; 4–11	East Makushita #7; 2–5	East Makushita #22; 4–3	East Makushita #16; 7–0–P; Champion
1976	East Jūryō #13; 6–9	West Makushita #3; 3–4	West Makushita #6; 7–0; Champion	West Jūryō #9; 9–6	West Jūryō #4; 7–8	East Jūryō #5; 4–11
1977	West Jūryō #12; 2–13	East Makushita #15; 5–2	East Makushita #8; 2–5	East Makushita #22; 5–2	West Makushita #12; 4–3	West Makushita #8; 4–3
1978	West Makushita #7; 6–1–P	West Jūryō #12; 7–8	West Jūryō #13; 8–7	West Jūryō #10; 6–9	East Makushita #2; 4–3	West Jūryō #12; 5–10
1979	West Makushita #4; 3–4	West Makushita #11; 3–4	East Makushita #19; 4–3	East Makushita #14; 4–3	East Makushita #10; 1–6	East Makushita #33; 5–2
1980	West Makushita #19; 3–4	West Makushita #27; 3–4	West Makushita #34; 4–3	West Makushita #25; 2–5	East Makushita #45; 4–3	East Makushita #34; 5–2
1981	East Makushita #20; 2–5	West Makushita #38; 4–3	West Makushita #25; 4–3	West Makushita #17; 4–3	East Makushita #14; 2–5	East Makushita #32; 4–3
1982	West Makushita #19; 1–6	East Makushita #42; 3–4	West Makushita #57; Retired; 3–4–0	x	x	x
Record given as wins–losses–absences Top division champion Top division runner-up Retired Lower divisions Non-participation Sanshō key: F=Fighting spirit; O=Outstanding performance; T=Technique Also shown: ★=Kinboshi; P=Playoff(s); Divisions: Makuuchi — Jūryō — Makushita — Sandanme — Jonidan — Jonokuchi Makuuchi ranks: Yokozuna — Ōzeki — Sekiwake — Komusubi — Maegashira

== See also ==
- Glossary of sumo terms
- List of past sumo wrestlers
- List of sumo tournament second division champions
