= Ōnishiki =

Ōnishiki may refer to:

- Ōnishiki Daigorō (1883–1943), sumo wrestler, the 28th Yokozuna
- Ōnishiki Uichirō (1891–1941), sumo wrestler, the 26th Yokozuna
- Ōnishiki Ittetsu (born 1953), sumo wrestler, former komusubi
