= Dewanohana Kuniichi =

Sumo wrestler

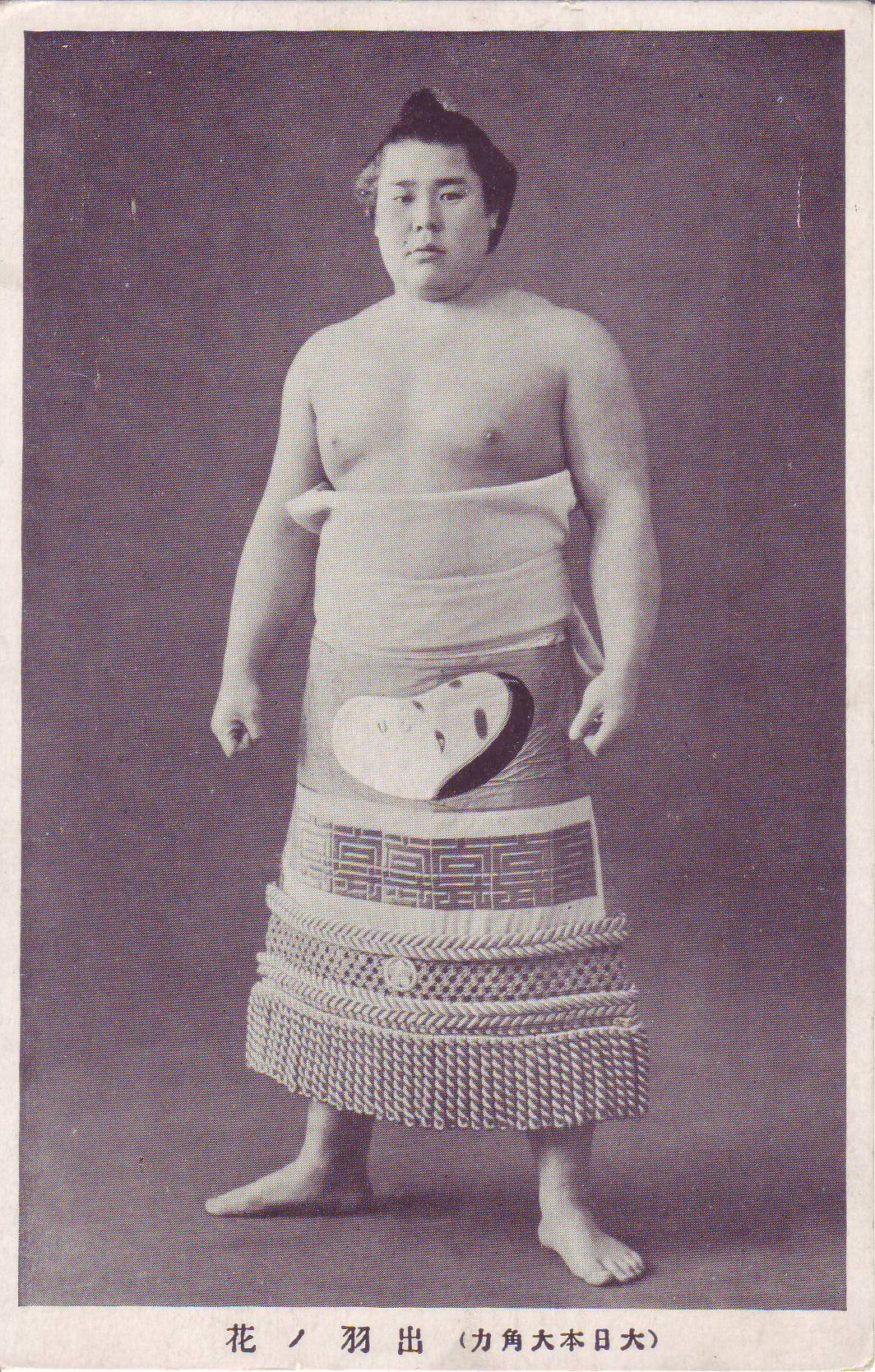

Personal information
- Native name: 出羽ノ花 國市
- Born: Kuniichi Ichikawa; 1 March 1909 Komatsu, Ishikawa, Japan
- Died: 30 May 1987 (aged 78)
- Height: 1.73 m (5 ft 8 in)
- Weight: 110 kg (240 lb; 17 st)

Sport
- Sport: Sumo
- Retired: May 1940
- Heya: Dewanoumi
- Record: 96-104-32
- Debut: January, 1925
- Highest rank: Maegashira 1 (January 1936)
- Elder name: Dewanoumi → Musashigawa
- Updated on June 2020

Dewanohana Kuniichi (Japanese: 出羽ノ花國市; March 1, 1909 – May 30, 1987), born Kuniichi Ichikawa (市川國一), was a Japanese professional sumo wrestler from Komatsu, Ishikawa (Japan). His highest rank was maegashira 1. After retiring from active competition in 1940, he took on a position as coach at Dewanoumi stable, later ascending to head coach from 1960 to 1968 following the death of Tsunenohana. He then was elected chairman (rijichō) of the Japan Sumo Association under the name of Musashigawa from 1968 to 1974. Unlike most of his contemporaries, he had a business education background.

== Dewanoumi succession turmoil ==
Dewanohana became head coach at his stable because he was considered old enough for the responsibility, in contrast to recently retired yokozuna Chiyonoyama who also sought the title. In 1965, Dewanohana's daughter married active yokozuna Sadanoyama, with the avowed objective of the latter inheriting the Dewanoumi stable following the conclusion of his career. This practice was common in the world of sumo, since kabu were traditionally inherited within the same family or between an apprentice and his master.

However, it also denied Chiyonoyama the opportunity to inherit the Dewanoumi name, which he had expected, as he was a senior yokozuna and a coach (under the name Kokonoe) at the stable. Sadanoyama being formally recognized as heir in 1967 created turmoil, resulting in Chiyonoyama resolving to break away from the Dewanoumi stable to found the Kokonoe stable with 10 wrestlers (including then ōzeki Kitanofuji). Because this founding broke the unwritten rule prohibiting oyakata independence from their stable (dating back to Hitachiyama), Dewanohana, after a long debate, permitted the creation of the new stable but expelled Chiyonoyama from the Dewanoumi ichimon.

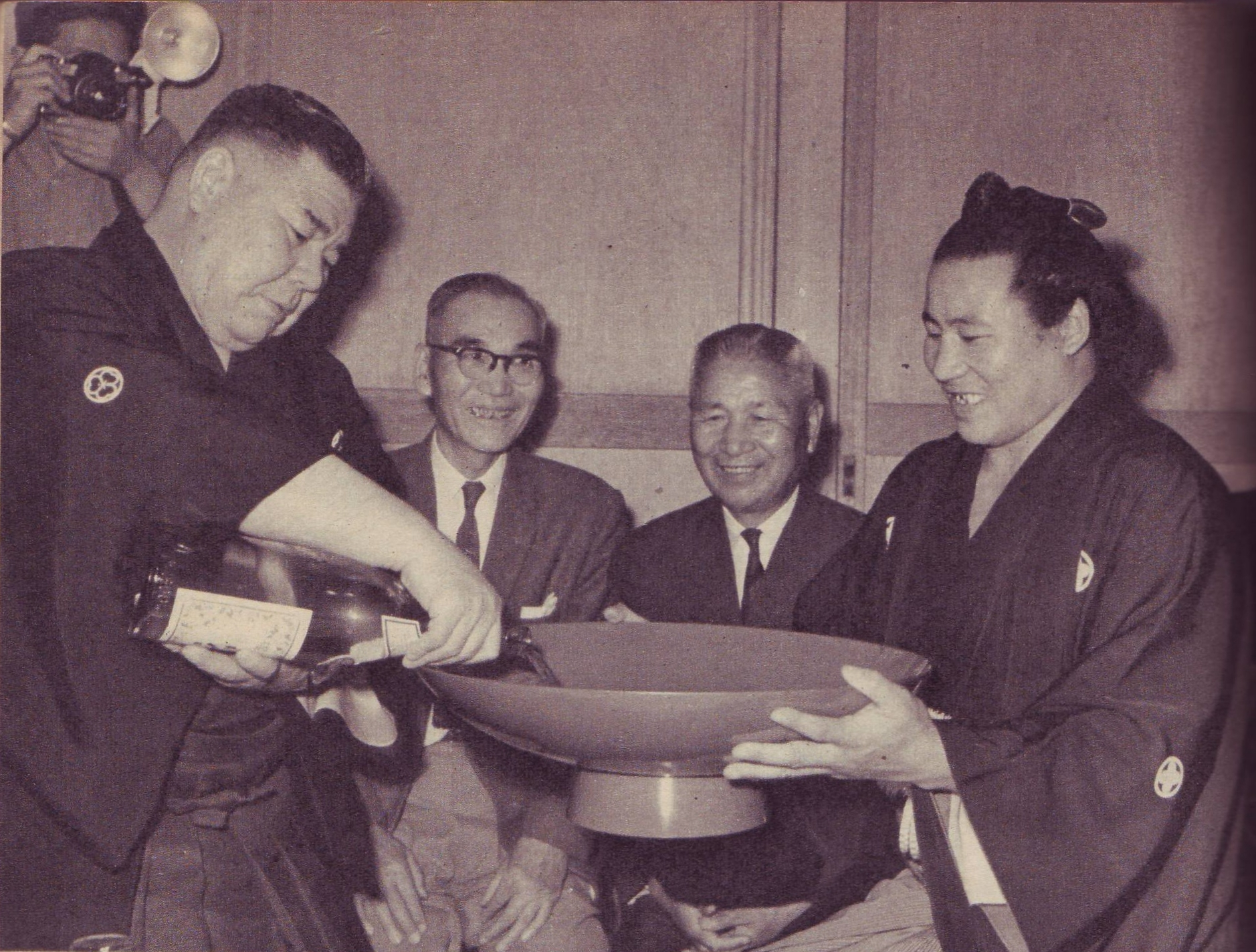
Dewanoumi (Dewanohana) offering sake to Sadanoyama during the celebration of his first yūshō (1961)

== Japan sumo association chairmanship ==
Having handed over the Dewanoumi kabu and stable to his freshly retired son-in-law Sadanoyama in March 1968, Dewanohana, now under the name of Musashigawa, was elected rijichō following the sudden death of the previous Association head Tokitsukaze (former yokozuna Futabayama) in December of the same year. His presidency was marked by several attempts to modernize Sumo, including the introduction of video refereeing (1969) or the renovation of Kuramae Kokugikan (1971). As of 2023 he remains the only former wrestler to ascend to the chairmanship of the modern Japan Sumo Association without having reached at least the rank of ōzeki as an active competitor.

== Later life and death ==
Approaching his mandatory retirement at 65 years of age, Musashigawa was succeeded as chairman by Kasugano (former yokozuna Tochinishiki) in February 1974, although he exceptionally remained a member of the Association to serve as an advisor after his 65th birthday, continuing to use the Musashigawa name. In January 1976 he retired from the Association to become director of the Sumo Museum under his civilian name Kuniichi Ichikawa, a position he held for the rest of his life.

Ichikawa's achievements in serving professional sumo were recognized with the Medal of Honor (Blue Ribbon) in 1970, and the Order of the Sacred Treasure (Third Class) in 1979.

Ichikawa died on May 30, 1987, at the age of 78. After his death, the Japan Sumo Association held an official Association funeral on June 2 to honor his achievements. Posthumously he was bestowed with the senior fifth rank in the Japanese court rank system.

== Career record ==
- In 1927 Tokyo and Osaka sumo merged and four tournaments a year in Tokyo and other locations began to be held.

Dewanohana Kuniichi
-	Spring Haru basho, varied	Summer Natsu basho, varied
1925	(Maezumo)	Shinjo; 0–2
1926	East Jonokuchi #12; 2–3	West Jonokuchi #5; 4–2
Record given as wins–losses–absences Top division champion Top division runner-up Retired Lower divisions Non-participation Sanshō key: F=Fighting spirit; O=Outstanding performance; T=Technique Also shown: ★=Kinboshi; P=Playoff(s); Divisions: Makuuchi — Jūryō — Makushita — Sandanme — Jonidan — Jonokuchi Makuuchi ranks: Yokozuna — Ōzeki — Sekiwake — Komusubi — Maegashira

-	Spring Haru basho, Tokyo	March Sangatsu basho, varied	Summer Natsu basho, Tokyo	October Jūgatsu basho, varied
1927	East Jonidan #29; 4–2	East Jonidan #29; 5–1	West Sandanme #49; 3–3	West Sandanme #31; 3–3
1928	West Sandanme #37; 2–4	West Sandanme #17; 3–3	East Sandanme #41; 4–2	East Sandanme #41; 3–3
1929	West Sandanme #12; 4–2	West Sandanme #12; 4–2	West Makushita #25; 3–3	West Makushita #25; 4–2
1930	West Makushita #11; 6–0	West Makushita #11; 3–3	West Jūryō #9; 2–9	West Jūryō #9; 5–6
1931	East Makushita #3; 3–3	East Makushita #3; 3–3	East Makushita #5; 5–1	East Makushita #5; 2–4
1932	East Maegashira #5; 0–0–8	East Maegashira #5; 0–0–10	East Jūryō #5; 0–0–11	East Jūryō #5; 6–5
Record given as wins–losses–absences Top division champion Top division runner-up Retired Lower divisions Non-participation Sanshō key: F=Fighting spirit; O=Outstanding performance; T=Technique Also shown: ★=Kinboshi; P=Playoff(s); Divisions: Makuuchi — Jūryō — Makushita — Sandanme — Jonidan — Jonokuchi Makuuchi ranks: Yokozuna — Ōzeki — Sekiwake — Komusubi — Maegashira

-	Spring Haru basho, Tokyo	Summer Natsu basho, Tokyo	Autumn Aki basho, Tokyo
1933	West Jūryō #11; 8–3	East Jūryō #3; 7–4	Not held
1934	West Maegashira #14; 6–5	East Maegashira #10; 6–5	Not held
1935	East Maegashira #7; 6–5	West Maegashira #4; 7–4	Not held
1936	East Maegashira #1; 2–9	East Maegashira #9; 5–6	Not held
1937	East Maegashira #10; 5–6	West Maegashira #13; 6–4–3	Not held
1938	West Maegashira #9; 7–6	East Maegashira #8; 5–8	Not held
1939	East Maegashira #13; 7–6	West Maegashira #10; 6–9	Not held
1940	West Maegashira #12; 0–4–11	West Maegashira #19; Retired; 0–0–15	x
Record given as win-loss-absent Top Division Champion Top Division Runner-up Retired Lower Divisions Key:d=Draw(s) (引分); h=Hold(s) (預り); Divisions: Makuuchi — Jūryō — Makushita — Sandanme — Jonidan — Jonokuchi Makuuchi ranks: Yokozuna — Ōzeki — Sekiwake — Komusubi — Maegashira

== See also ==
- Glossary of sumo terms
- List of past sumo wrestlers

Sporting positions
Preceded by Futabayama Sadaji	Chairman of the Japan Sumo Association; 1968–1974	Succeeded by Tochinishiki Kiyotaka
