= Dewanohana =

Dewanohana may refer to:

- Dewanohana Kuniichi (1909–1987), sumo wrestler, former maegashira 1 and chairman of the Japan Sumo Association
- Dewanohana Yoshitaka (born 1951), sumo wrestler, former sekiwake
