= Miyagiyama Fukumatsu =

Japanese sumo wrestler

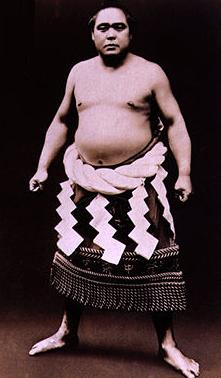
- Fukumatsu, c. 1924-1931

Personal information
- Native name: 宮城山 福松
- Born: Satō Fukumatsu; February 27, 1895 Iwate, Japan
- Died: November 19, 1943 (aged 48)
- Height: 1.76 m (5 ft 9 1/2 in)
- Weight: 113 kg (249 lb)

Sport
- Sport: Sumo
- Retired: January 1931
- Heya: Dewanoumi → Takadagawa
- Record: 90-69-38-1draw (Makuuchi)
- Debut: June 1910
- Highest rank: Yokozuna (February, 1922)
- Elder name: Shiratama
- Championships: 2 (Makuuchi, official); 4 (Osaka Makuuchi, unofficial)
- Updated on June 2025

Miyagiyama Fukumatsu (Japanese: 宮城山 福松; February 27, 1895 – November 19, 1943) was a Japanese professional sumo wrestler from Ichinoseki, Iwate Prefecture. He was the sport's 29th yokozuna, and the last yokozuna in Osaka sumo.

== Career ==
He was born Satō Fukumatsu (佐藤 福松). In the fall of 1909, he joined Dewanoumi stable. He made his professional debut in June 1910 using the shikona name Iwategawa (岩手川). However, he was punched by Kyushuzan Juro and escaped from Tokyo sumo in May 1912. He did not abandon the idea of becoming a wrestler and moved to Osaka sumo. In January 1913 he began using the ring name Miyagiyama (宮木山), before changing it to Miyagiyama Fukumatsu in May 1914.

Miyagiyama reached the top makuuchi division in 1916 and he was promoted to ōzeki after only 2 tournaments. In January 1920, he won his first championship with an 8-1-1draw record. In March 1921, he fought against wrestlers in Tokyo sumo and defeated sekiwake Genjiyama, ōzeki Tsunenohana, yokozuna Ōnishiki and Kyushuzan. Around this time he reconciled with Kyushuzan.

In June 1921, he won the championship with an 8–2 record. In January 1922, he won the championship with a perfect 10–0 record. After winning two consecutive championships, he was awarded a yokozuna licence. He was absent from two tournaments in 1923 due to a phlegmon on the middle finger of his right hand. In January 1926, he won the championship with a 9–1 record.

In 1927, Osaka Sumo Association disbanded and its wrestlers merged with Tokyo sumo. At that time, Osaka sumo's level was very low and he was not considered to be strong enough. However, he felt he had to save the honor of Osaka sumo as yokozuna. Although his strength had already declined, he fought tooth and nail and won 2 championships in Tokyo sumo as part of the Osaka contingent of wrestlers. The first of these, in January 1927, was the first tournament to be held under the auspices of the Dai Nihon Ozumo Kyokai (now the Japan Sumo Association). Considering that he had been retained as a yokozuna simply because there was no precedent for demoting one and to allow Osaka sumo to save face, it was regarded as a sensational result.

After his retirement, he became the 6th head coach of Shibatayama stable. The stable was closed after his death. Afterward, the 62nd yokozuna Ōnokuni became the 12th holder of the Shibatayama name and he opened the modern Shibatayama stable.

== Osaka sumo top division record ==
- Osaka sumo existed independently for many years before merging with Tokyo sumo in 1926. 1–2 tournaments were held yearly, though the actual time they were held was often erratic.

Miyagiyama Fukumatsu
	First	Second
1916	x	East Maegashira #7; 8–1; 1h
1917	East Sekiwake; 8–1; 1h	West Ōzeki; 8–1; 1h
1918	Sat out	West Ōzeki; 8–2
1919	East Ōzeki; 6–3; 1h	East Ōzeki; 7–2–1
1920	East Ōzeki; 8–1; 1d Unofficial	West Ōzeki; 6–3; 1d
1921	West Ōzeki; 2–4–3; 1d	West Ōzeki; 8–2; Unofficial
1922	East Ōzeki; 10–0; Unofficial	East Yokozuna; 7–1; 2d
1923	Sat out	Sat out
1924	East Yokozuna; 2–0–8	Sat out
1925	East Yokozuna; 4–2–3; 1d	East Yokozuna; 1–0–9
1926	East Yokozuna; 9–1; Unofficial	Not held
Record given as win-loss-absent Top Division Champion Top Division Runner-up Retired Lower Divisions Key:d=Draw(s) (引分); h=Hold(s) (預り); Divisions: Makuuchi — Jūryō — Makushita — Sandanme — Jonidan — Jonokuchi Makuuchi ranks: Yokozuna — Ōzeki — Sekiwake — Komusubi — Maegashira

*Championships for the best record in a tournament were not recognized or awarded in Osaka sumo before its merger with Tokyo sumo, and the unofficial championships above are historically conferred. For more information, see yūshō.

== Merged sumo top division record ==
- In 1927 Tokyo and Osaka sumo merged and four tournaments a year in Tokyo and other locations began to be held.

Miyagiyama Fukumatsu
-	Spring Haru basho, Tokyo	March Sangatsu basho, varied	Summer Natsu basho, Tokyo	October Jūgatsu basho, varied
1927	East Yokozuna; 10–1	East Yokozuna; 7–3–1; 1d	East Yokozuna; 3–3–5	West Yokozuna; 4–7
1928	West Yokozuna; 7–4	East Yokozuna; 7–4	East Yokozuna; 7–4	East Yokozuna; 9–2
1929	West Yokozuna; 1–4–6	West Yokozuna; 2–3–6	West Yokozuna; 3–3–5	West Yokozuna; 8–3
1930	West Yokozuna; 6–5	West Yokozuna; 4–7	West Yokozuna; 6–5	West Yokozuna; 1–6–4
1931	East Yokozuna; 5–6	East Yokozuna; Retired –	x	x
Record given as win-loss-absent Top Division Champion Top Division Runner-up Retired Lower Divisions Key:d=Draw(s) (引分); h=Hold(s) (預り); Divisions: Makuuchi — Jūryō — Makushita — Sandanme — Jonidan — Jonokuchi Makuuchi ranks: Yokozuna — Ōzeki — Sekiwake — Komusubi — Maegashira

== References in popular culture ==
Miyagiyama is briefly mentioned in Chapter 17 of Memoirs of a Geisha, when many of the novel's main characters attend a sumo exhibition in Kyoto. He competes in his role as yokozuna, winning his bout by hataki komi (slap down).

He was portrayed by the ex-sumo wrestler Mainoumi Shūhei in the adapted film.

== See also ==
- Glossary of sumo terms
- List of past sumo wrestlers
- List of sumo tournament top division champions
- List of yokozuna

Preceded by Ōnishiki Daigorō	29th Yokozuna; 1922–1931	Succeeded by Nishinoumi Kajirō III
Yokozuna is not a successive rank, and more than one wrestler can hold the title at once
