= Ōnishiki Ittetsu =

Sumo wrestler

Personal information
- Native name: 大錦 一徹
- Born: Morio Obori; 11 September 1953 (age 73) Sado, Niigata, Japan
- Height: 1.84 m (6 ft 1/2 in)
- Weight: 145 kg (320 lb)

Sport
- Sport: Sumo
- Retired: January, 1988
- Heya: Dewanoumi
- Record: 750–745–28
- Debut: May, 1968
- Highest rank: Komusubi (November, 1973)
- Elder name: Yamashina
- Championships: 4 (Jūryō); 1 (Makushita); 1 (Jonidan)
- Special Prizes: Outstanding Performance (1); Fighting Spirit (1); Technique (1)
- Gold Stars: 8 Wakanohana II (3); Wajima (2); Kotozakura; Chiyonofuji; Futahaguro
- Updated on June 2020

Ōnishiki Ittetsu (born 11 September 1953 as Morio Obori) is a former sumo wrestler from Sado, Niigata, Japan. He made his professional debut in May 1968, and reached the top division in September 1973. His highest rank was komusubi. He retired in January 1988 and became an elder in the Japan Sumo Association under the name Yamashina, holding the Special Executive position.

== Career ==
He joined sumo in May 1968 at the age of just 14, competing under his own surname of Obori. He was considered a very promising prospect and after winning his first jūryō division championship in May 1973 he was given the shikona or fighting name Ōnishiki, after a great wrestler from his Dewanoumi stable, the 26th yokozuna Ōnishiki Uichirō. Just two tournaments later he became the first wrestler in sumo history to win all three sanshō or special prizes, for Fighting Spirit, Technique and Outstanding Performance, in his debut top division tournament. He was also runner–up in this basho and earned his first kinboshi or gold star by defeating yokozuna Kotozakura. He was promoted straight to komusubi, which was to be his highest rank, but he suffered a serious back injury and scored only 3–12. He never made the rank again. As well his back problem he also suffered from knee problems and diabetes, and spent the rest of his career moving up and down the ranks of the two salaried divisions. He was to win seven more kinboshi, but he was also demoted to jūryō on a number of occasions, where he picked up three more jūryō championships. He only fell to the third makushita division once during this period though. In this tournament in May 1979 at makushita 1 he posted a perfect 7-0 record, took the championship, and also handed Itai his first defeat in professional sumo, ending a consecutive winning streak from debut which was a record at that time. In September 1982 he became the first wrestler to immediately follow a win by default (over Koboyama) with a loss by default. He retired in January 1988 rather than face demotion to the makushita division again.

== Retirement ==
Onishiki remained in sumo as a toshiyori or elder, and was known as Yamashina Oyakata. He worked as a coach at Dewanoumi stable and as a member of the Japan Sumo Association′s board of directors, holding the Special Executive position. He retired from the Sumo Association in September 2018 after turning 65 years of age.

== Fighting style ==
Onishiki was a yotsu sumo specialist who favoured hidari yotsu, or a right hand outside, left hand inside grip on his opponent′s mawashi. His favourite kimarite or techniques were yori kiri (force out) and uwatenage (overarm throw).

== Career record ==
Ōnishiki Ittetsu
Year	January Hatsu basho, Tokyo	March Haru basho, Osaka	May Natsu basho, Tokyo	July Nagoya basho, Nagoya	September Aki basho, Tokyo	November Kyūshū basho, Fukuoka
1968	x	x	(Maezumo)	(Maezumo)	West Jonokuchi #9; 5–2	West Jonidan #41; 2–5
1969	East Jonidan #59; 1–2–4	East Jonidan #76; 7–0; Champion	West Sandanme #51; 1–6	East Sandanme #77; 3–4	East Sandanme #84; 2–5	West Sandanme #98; 6–1
1970	West Sandanme #45; 4–3	West Sandanme #33; 3–4	West Sandanme #38; 4–3	West Sandanme #19; 4–3	East Sandanme #8; 6–1	East Makushita #39; 4–3
1971	East Makushita #33; 6–1	East Makushita #13; 2–5	East Makushita #30; 5–2	West Makushita #12; 5–2	West Makushita #6; 0–7	East Makushita #35; 4–3
1972	East Makushita #30; 5–2	West Makushita #18; 4–3	East Makushita #14; 5–2	East Makushita #6; 4–3	West Makushita #3; 3–4	West Makushita #5; 4–3
1973	East Makushita #4; 4–3	West Makushita #2; 5–2	West Jūryō #12; 11–4; Champion	West Jūryō #2; 10–5	West Maegashira #11; 11–4; FOT★	East Komusubi #1; 3–12
1974	West Maegashira #9; 5–10	East Jūryō #1; 10–5	West Maegashira #11; 8–7	East Maegashira #9; 10–5	West Maegashira #2; 7–8 ★	East Maegashira #4; 5–10 ★
1975	East Maegashira #9; 7–8	East Maegashira #12; 7–8	West Maegashira #14; 8–7	West Maegashira #10; 6–9	East Maegashira #13; 7–8	West Jūryō #1; 7–8
1976	East Jūryō #2; 5–10	East Jūryō #7; 7–8	West Jūryō #8; 10–5	East Jūryō #2; 10–5	West Maegashira #12; 11–4	East Maegashira #2; 5–10
1977	East Maegashira #8; 7–8	West Maegashira #9; 3–9–3	West Jūryō #4; 8–7	East Jūryō #2; 11–4; Champion	East Maegashira #11; 9–6	East Maegashira #5; 3–12
1978	West Maegashira #13; 5–10	East Jūryō #6; 10–5	West Jūryō #1; 9–6	East Maegashira #11; 5–10	East Jūryō #4; 10–5	East Maegashira #12; 7–8
1979	West Jūryō #1; 5–10	West Jūryō #6; 4–11	East Makushita #1; 7–0; Champion	East Jūryō #5; 6–9	East Jūryō #8; 7–8	East Jūryō #12; 8–7
1980	West Jūryō #8; 6–9	East Jūryō #12; 12–3; Champion	West Jūryō #2; 5–7–3	West Jūryō #8; 7–6–2	West Jūryō #10; 7–8	East Jūryō #11; 10–5
1981	East Jūryō #5; 11–4	West Maegashira #12; 8–7	East Maegashira #8; 9–6	East Maegashira #3; 5–10	East Maegashira #7; 9–6 ★	East Maegashira #3; 6–9 ★
1982	West Maegashira #6; 10–5	East Maegashira #1; 7–8 ★	West Maegashira #2; 6–9	West Maegashira #4; 6–9 ★	East Maegashira #8; 7–3–5	West Maegashira #10; 8–7
1983	West Maegashira #5; 1–3–11	West Jūryō #1; 5–10	West Jūryō #5; 8–7	East Jūryō #4; 8–7	West Jūryō #2; 9–6	East Maegashira #13; 4–11
1984	East Jūryō #6; 12–3; Champion	East Maegashira #13; 10–5	West Maegashira #4; 6–9	East Maegashira #9; 7–8	West Maegashira #10; 9–6	West Maegashira #2; 3–12
1985	West Maegashira #12; 8–7	East Maegashira #10; 11–4	West Maegashira #1; 6–9	West Maegashira #3; 6–9	East Maegashira #7; 8–7	West Maegashira #1; 4–11
1986	East Maegashira #11; 4–11	East Jūryō #3; 10–5	West Maegashira #13; 8–7	East Maegashira #9; 5–10	East Jūryō #1; 9–6	East Maegashira #11; 6–9
1987	East Jūryō #1; 9–6	East Maegashira #11; 7–8	East Maegashira #12; 9–6	West Maegashira #3; 4–11 ★	East Maegashira #11; 2–13	East Jūryō #5; 6–9
1988	West Jūryō #9; Retired; 5–10	x	x	x	x	x
Record given as wins–losses–absences Top division champion Top division runner-up Retired Lower divisions Non-participation Sanshō key: F=Fighting spirit; O=Outstanding performance; T=Technique Also shown: ★=Kinboshi; P=Playoff(s); Divisions: Makuuchi — Jūryō — Makushita — Sandanme — Jonidan — Jonokuchi Makuuchi ranks: Yokozuna — Ōzeki — Sekiwake — Komusubi — Maegashira

== See also ==
- Glossary of sumo terms
- List of sumo tournament top division runners-up
- List of sumo tournament second division champions
- List of past sumo wrestlers
- List of sumo elders
- List of komusubi
