= Tochigiyama Moriya =

Japanese sumo wrestler (1892-1959)

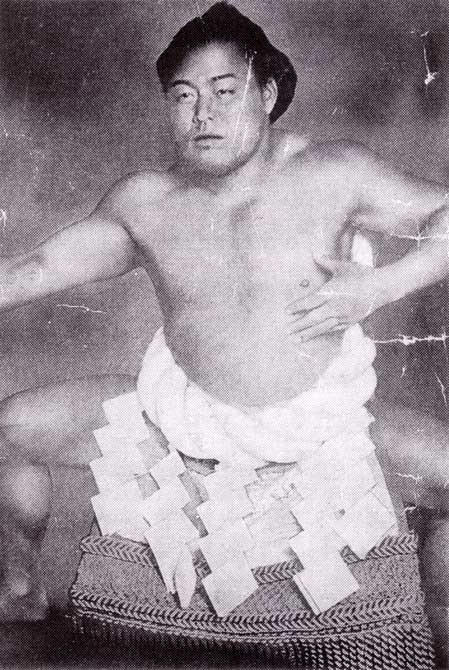
- Tochigiyama, circa 1919

Personal information
- Native name: 栃木山 守也
- Born: Yokoda Moriya; February 5, 1892 Akama (now part of Tochigi), Tochigi, Japan
- Died: October 3, 1959 (aged 67)
- Height: 1.72 m (5 ft 7 1/2 in)
- Weight: 104 kg (229 lb; 16.4 st)

Sport
- Sport: Sumo
- Retired: May, 1925
- Heya: Dewanoumi
- Record: 197-26-24; 7draws-5holds (Total); 166-23-24; 7draws-4holds (Makuuchi)
- Debut: February, 1911
- Highest rank: Yokozuna (February, 1918)
- Elder name: Kasugano
- Championships: 9 (Makuuchi); 1 (Makushita)
- Updated on June 2020

Tochigiyama Moriya (Japanese: 栃木山 守也; February 5, 1892 – October 3, 1959) was a Japanese professional sumo wrestler. He was the sport's 27th yokozuna from 1918 until 1925. Generally he is considered one of the pioneers of modern sumo. He remains the lightest yokozuna in the history of the sport with a weight of 104 kg.

== Early career ==
He was born Yokoda Moriya (横田 守也), but later changed his surname to Nakata (中田). He entered sumo in February 1911, using the shikona Tochigiyama Senjō (栃木山 専成) until changing the given name to Moriya in January 1914. His coach Hitachiyama Taniemon did not expect him to be strong owing to his light weight. However, Tochigiyama lost only 3 bouts on his way to the top makuuchi division, achieving promotion in January 1915. Tochigiyama defeated Tachiyama Mineemon, ending his series of 56 victories, on the 8th day of the May 1916 tournament.

Tochigiyama was promoted to ōzeki in May 1917. After he won his first two championships at ōzeki without suffering a single defeat, he was promoted to yokozuna in February 1918.

== Yokozuna ==
Tochigiyama won a third championship during his first tournament as yokozuna. He also won the following two tournaments, meaning he achieved five consecutive championships between May 1917 and May 1919.

Tochigiyama defeated other wrestlers with his strong oshi, or pushing techniques. He compensated for his lack of weight by training extremely hard. He was nicknamed the "little giant yokozuna". Like Hitachiyama before him, he trained many wrestlers, such as later yokozuna Tamanishiki San'emon, even though they were not members of the Dewanoumi stable.

In May 1925, he suddenly retired after winning three consecutive championships between January 1924 and January 1925. Asked about his retirement, he stated that he wanted to retire while still a strong opponent.

The painter Foujita made his portrait in sumotori in 1926 in Paris; the painting is kept in the musée de Grenoble (France).

Tochigiyama only lost 23 times while an active sumo wrestler in the top makuuchi division, and only eight times during his seven years as yokozuna. His top division winning percentage was 87.8. In addition, his winning percentage as yokozuna reached 93.5, the fourth best in history after Jinmaku, Tachiyama and Tanikaze.

== Retirement from sumo ==
After his retirement, he was permitted to leave Dewanoumi stable and become the eighth head coach of Kasugano stable. He was the adopted son of its previous head coach, referee Kimura Soshiro. In his tenure, Tochigiyama produced yokozuna Tochinishiki Kiyotaka.

In June 1931, Tochigiyama took part in the first Dai-Nippon Rikishi Senshuken (大日本角力選手権), special sumo tournament. To the surprise of many, he defeated Tamanishiki and Tenryū, and won the championship. In the modern age, retired wrestlers can no longer take part in any special sumo tournaments.

In 1952 he performed his kanreki dohyō-iri or '60th year ring entrance ceremony' to commemorate his years as yokozuna. His strength hardly declined long into his retirement. It is reported that Tochigiyama in his sixties easily carried a large hibachi which none of his other junior stable members could move.

He died suddenly in 1959 whilst still in charge of Kasugano stable. Tochinishiki, who Tochigiyama had in turn adopted as his son, took over as head coach of the stable.

== Career record ==
Tochigayama Moriya
-	Spring	Summer
1911	(Maezumo)	Jonokuchi #29; 5–0
1912	Jonidan #37; 5–0	Sandanme #46; 3–0; 1h
1913	East Makushita #49; 5–0; Champion	Makushita #11; 4–1
1914	West Jūryō #10; 4–1	East Jūryō #4; 4–1
1915	East Maegashira #16; 8–2	East Maegashira #2; 5–4; 1d
1916	East Maegashira #1; 7–3	East Komusubi; 6–3–1
1917	West Sekiwake; 6–3–1	West Ōzeki; 9–0; 1h
1918	East Ōzeki; 10–0	East Yokozuna; 9–1
1919	East Yokozuna; 9–0–1	East Yokozuna; 10–0
1920	East Yokozuna; 8–2	West Yokozuna; 8–0; 1d 1h
1921	West Yokozuna; 9–0; 1h	East Yokozuna; 9–1
1922	East Yokozuna; 8–1; 1h	West Yokozuna; 7–1–1; 1d
1923	East Yokozuna; 8–1; 1d	West Yokozuna; 1–0–9; 1h
1924	West Yokozuna; 9–0; 1d	East Yokozuna; 10–1
1925	East Yokozuna; 10–0; 1d	West Yokozuna; Retired; 0–0–11
Record given as win-loss-absent Top Division Champion Top Division Runner-up Retired Lower Divisions Key:d=Draw(s) (引分); h=Hold(s) (預り); Divisions: Makuuchi — Jūryō — Makushita — Sandanme — Jonidan — Jonokuchi Makuuchi ranks: Yokozuna — Ōzeki — Sekiwake — Komusubi — Maegashira

== See also ==
- Glossary of sumo terms
- Kanreki dohyō-iri
- List of past sumo wrestlers
- List of sumo tournament top division champions
- List of yokozuna

Preceded by Ōnishiki Uichirō	27th Yokozuna; February 1918 – May 1925	Succeeded by Ōnishiki Daigorō
Yokozuna is not a successive rank, and more than one wrestler can hold the title at once
