= Shionoumi Unemon =

Japanese sumo wrestler

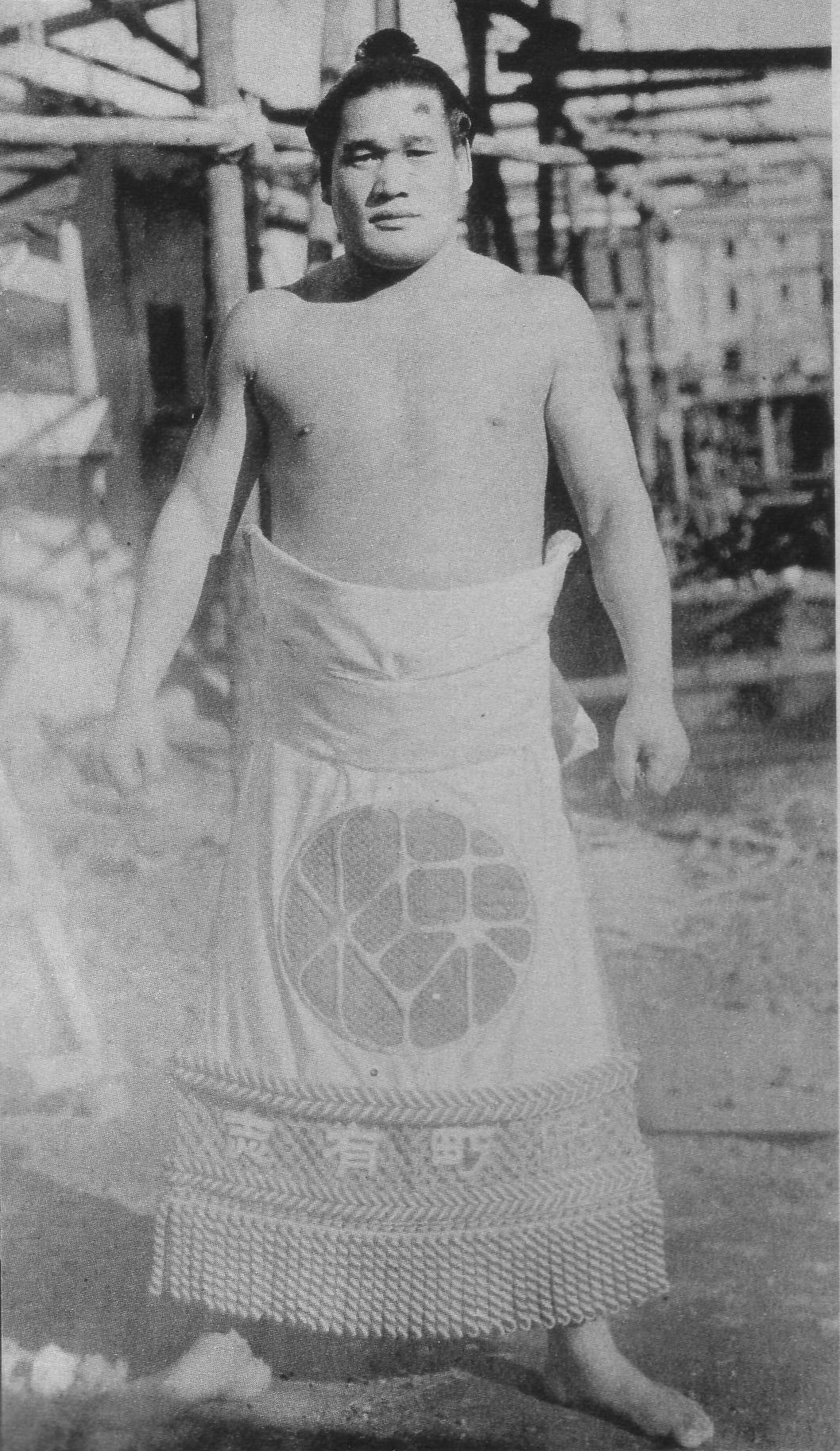

Personal information
- Native name: 汐ノ海運右エ門
- Born: Tadao Kishimoto; March 1, 1918 Himeji, Hyōgo Prefecture, Japan
- Died: July 18, 1983 (aged 65)
- Height: 1.8 m (5 ft 11 in)
- Weight: 113 kg (249 lb)

Sport
- Sport: Sumo
- Retired: May, 1951
- Record: 184-140-16
- Debut: January, 1938
- Highest rank: Ōzeki (June, 1947)
- Elder name: Dekiyama
- Gold Stars: 2 Futabayama; Azumafuji

Shionoumi Unemon (born Tado Kishimoto; 1 March 1918 – 18 July 1983) was a sumo wrestler from Himeji, Japan. He made his professional debut in January 1938, reaching the top makuuchi division in January 1943. His highest rank was ōzeki, which he held in two spells from June 1947 until October 1948, and again from January 1950 until his retirement in May 1951. He then became an elder of the Japan Sumo Association and worked as a coach at Dewanoumi stable until reaching the mandatory retirement age of 65 in 1983. He died later in the same year.

== Career ==
Shionoumi was born in Innan, Hyōgo (present day Himeji). He was known for his strong physique since elementary school, and worked alongside adults in salt making. He was spotted by the top division wrestler Kasagiyama Katsuichi who persuaded him to join the prestigious Dewanoumi stable. At the time, Dewanoumi stable was seeking a way to stop the dominance of Futabayama from the rival Tatsunami stable, and Kasagiyama, a talented Waseda University graduate, was tasked with this research. The young Kishimoto was seen as extremely promising. He made his debut in January 1938 at the age of 20, initially fighting under his own surname. He rose quickly through the lower divisions, and reached sekitori status in January 1942 when he was promoted to the jūryō division. To mark the occasion he changed his shikona to Shionoumi. He made his top makuuchi division debut in January 1943, and in January 1944 earned his first kinboshi, or gold star for a yokozuna upset, when he defeated Futabayama. He progressed into the sanyaku ranks, making komusubi and then sekiwake, and in the only tournament held in 1946 he was runner-up to Haguroyama with an 11–2 record. After this tournament, he was promoted to ōzeki. He scored only five wins against five losses in his debut ōzeki tournament held in June 1947, and was demoted from the rank after two consecutive losing scores in May and October 1948. However, he returned to ōzeki after two strong performances in 1949, defeating yokozuna Azumafuji in May and following up with another 10–5 record at sekiwake in October. He held onto his ōzeki rank in 1950, but had a poor tournament in January 1951, being forced to default after four days, missing the next three through injury and then returning to lose another eight straight to finish with a 0–12–3 record. He retired after the following tournament, facing demotion from ōzeki once again. His career record was 184 wins against 140 losses, with 16 injury absences. His top division record was 125–115. He had shouldered the burden of being the future of Dewanoumi stable, but had been unable to win a championship or defeat Haguroyama in 13 attempts. (The only other ōzeki to face a yokozuna 10 or more times in his career and have no wins was Miyabiyama, who went 0–11 against Takanohana.)

== Retirement from sumo ==
Shionoumi remained in sumo as a coach at Dewanoumi stable, as an elder of the Japan Sumo Association under the name Dekiyama. He was also a judge of tournament bouts. He reached the mandatory retirement age of 65 and left the Sumo Association on 28 February 1983. He worked in a ryokan in Monzennakacho, Kōtō, but died of a myocardial infarction on 18 July of the same year.

== Career record ==
Shionoumi Unemon
-	Spring Haru basho, Tokyo	Summer Natsu basho, Tokyo	Autumn Aki basho, Tokyo
1938	(Maezumo)	West Jonokuchi #8; 5–2	x
1939	East Jonidan #8; 6–1	East Sandanme #9; 6–2	x
1940	West Makushita #31; 3–5	East Makushita #30; 4–4	x
1941	West Makushita #24; 6–2	West Makushita #9; 7–1	x
1942	East Jūryō #12; 9–6	West Jūryō #6; 13–2	x
1943	East Maegashira #18; 12–3	West Maegashira #5; 5–10	x
1944	East Maegashira #12; 8–7 ★	West Maegashira #6; 6–4	West Komusubi #1; 7–3
1945	x	East Sekiwake #2; 3–4	East Komusubi #1; 8–2
1946	x	x	East Sekiwake; 11–2
1947	x	West Ōzeki #3; 5–5	West Ōzeki #2; 8–3
1948	x	West Ōzeki #1; 0–5–6	West Ōzeki #2; 3–8
1949	East Sekiwake #1; 4–9	West Maegashira #2; 10–5 ★	East Sekiwake #1; 10–5
1950	East Ōzeki #2; 10–5	West Ōzeki #1; 6–9	West Ōzeki #2; 8–7
1951	West Ōzeki #1; 0–12–3	East Ōzeki #2; Retired; 1–7–7	x
Record given as wins–losses–absences Top division champion Top division runner-up Retired Lower divisions Non-participation Sanshō key: F=Fighting spirit; O=Outstanding performance; T=Technique Also shown: ★=Kinboshi; P=Playoff(s); Divisions: Makuuchi — Jūryō — Makushita — Sandanme — Jonidan — Jonokuchi Makuuchi ranks: Yokozuna — Ōzeki — Sekiwake — Komusubi — Maegashira

== See also ==
- List of ōzeki
