= Hitachiyama Torakichi =

Japanese professional sumo wrestler

Hitachiyama Torakichi 常陸山 虎吉
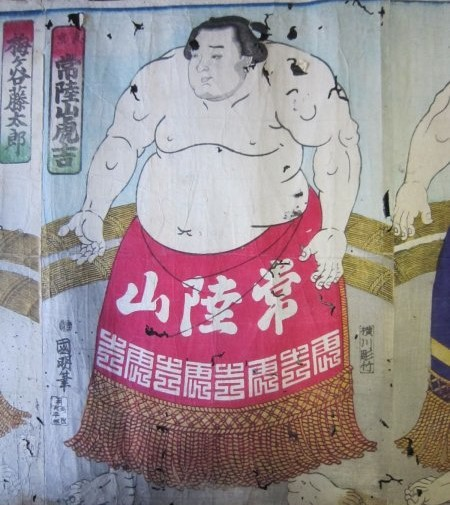

Personal information
- Born: Isoarashi Torakichi; 1850 Ibaraki Prefecture, Japan
- Died: November 1, 1915 (aged 64–65)
- Weight: 90 kg (200 lb; 14 st)

Sport
- Sport: Sumo
- Retired: May 1896
- Heya: Hamakaze → Dewanoumi
- Debut: April 1873
- Highest rank: Maegashira 1 (January 1889)
- Elder name: Dewanoumi
- Updated on October 6, 2022

Hitachiyama Torakichi (Japanese: 常陸山 虎吉; born in 1850 as Isoarashi Torakichi (五十嵐 虎吉, Isoarashi Torakichi)), also known as Dewanoumi Unemon (出羽ノ海 運右エ門, Dewanoumi Unemon), was a Japanese professional sumo wrestler from Ibaraki prefecture. He wrestled for the Hamakaze and Dewanoumi stables. His highest rank was Maegashira 1.

== History ==
Not much is known about Hitachiyama. He began his career in April 1873 and achieved sekitoriship in 1878. Although he never reached san'yaku ranks, he notably achieved wins against sekiwake Asashio Tarō. In 1890, he assumed the shikona of Dewanoumi Unemon. Stables at the time were closer to dojo than contemporary heya, therefore he could assume a toshiyori without actually retiring. During his years as stable master, he raised yokozuna Hitachiyama Taniemon, to whom he bestowed his old shikona in 1894. Hitachiyama Tamiemon was from the same town, Mito, as his stablemaster. In 1895, when Hitachiyama was in the makushita division, Dewanoumi refused him permission to marry Dewanoumi's niece, which so upset Hitachiyama that he ran away from the stable and defected to Osaka sumo before returning two years later. In May 1896, Dewanoumi finally retired and took control of the Dewanoumi stable.

In 1915, he stood down as elder and the stable was inherited by Hitachiyama. Dewanoumi Unemon died in November of the same year.
Hitachiyama was known for being a heavy drinker and was nicknamed "Dobu Tora" (ドブ虎, "drainage ditch Tora") because he drank nothing but cheap unrefined sake.

== Top Division Record ==
Hitachiyama Torakichi
-	Spring	Summer
1873	–	–
1874	–	–
1875	–	–
1876	–	–
1877	–	–
1878	–	West Jūryō #10; 5–3; 1h
1879	East Jūryō #10; 8–0– 1d - 1h	East Jūryō #8; 1–4; 3d - 2h
1880	East Jūryō #9; 4–1; 3d	East Jūryō #1; 3–6
1881	East Jūryō #1; 3–6	East Jūryō #2; 4–2; 3d
1882	West Jūryō #1; 6–3	East Maegashira #7; 3–2–3; 2d
1883	West Maegashira #6; 1–7–1; 1d	West Maegashira #6; 5–2–2; 1d
1884	West Maegashira #5; 2–5–3	East Maegashira #7; 4–2–1; 3 h
1885	West Maegashira #2; 2–4–2; 1d - 1h	West Maegashira #4; 3–4–1; 1d - 1h
1886	West Maegashira #2; 4–3–1; 2d	West Maegashira #2; 4–3–1; 1d - 1h
1887	West Maegashira #2; 3–5–2	West Maegashira #5; 5–2–1
1888	West Maegashira #2; 0–0–10	West Maegashira #5; 5–2–1; 1d - 1h
1889	East Maegashira #1; 2–7–1	West Maegashira #3; 2–5–3
1890	West Maegashira #7; 4–3–1; 1d - 1h	East Maegashira #2; 1–6–1; 1d - 1h
1891	East Maegashira #5; 2–4–1; 3d	East Maegashira #7; 4–4–1; 1d
1892	East Maegashira #8; 6–3–1	East Maegashira #4; 3–4–1; 1d - 1h
1893	East Maegashira #6; 4–4–1; 1d	West Maegashira #4; 1–7–1; 1d
1894	West Maegashira #9; 4–3–1; 2d	East Maegashira #9; 2–4–1; 2d - 1h
1895	West Maegashira #10; 6–1–1; 2d	East Maegashira #8; 3–5–2
1896	East Maegashira #8; 0–7–3	West Maegashira #14; Retired; 0–4–6
Record given as win-loss-absent Top Division Champion Retired Lower Divisions Key: d=Draw(s) (引分); h=Hold(s) (預り); nr=no result recorded Divisions: Makuuchi — Jūryō — Makushita — Sandanme — Jonidan — Jonokuchi Makuuchi ranks: Yokozuna (not ranked as such on banzuke until 1890); Ōzeki — Sekiwake — Komusubi — Maegashira
