= Ōnishiki Daigorō =

Japanese sumo wrestler

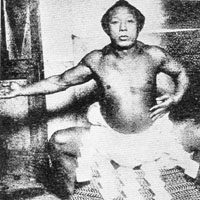

Personal information
- Native name: 大錦 大五郎
- Born: Yamada Daigorō; 1883年7月22日 Aichi, Japan
- Died: 1943年5月16日(59歳没)
- Height: 1.76 m (5 ft 9 1/2 in)
- Weight: 112 kg (247 lb)

Sport
- Sport: Sumo
- Retired: January 1922
- Heya: Asahiyama
- Record: 161-50-2; 13draws-11holds (Makuuchi in Osaka)
- Debut: 1898年(京都)
- Highest rank: Yokozuna (April 1918)
- Championships: 6 (Osaka Makuuchi, unofficial)
- Updated on October 2007

Ōnishiki Daigorō (Japanese: 大錦 大五郎; 22 July 1883 – 16 May 1943) was a Japanese professional sumo wrestler. He was the sport's 28th yokozuna.

== Career ==
He was born Yamada Daigorō (山田 大五郎) in Ama District, Aichi Prefecture, in what is now Yatomi City. There are several conflicting sources as to his specific birth date in 1883, and he later changed his surname to Torii (鳥井)

He started sumo in Kyoto in 1898, later moving to Osaka. He entered the top makuuchi division in February 1906. He was promoted to ōzeki in June 1910. In May 1918 he became the 28th yokozuna (the third in Osaka sumo). The reason for his promotion to yokozuna was cited as being because of his great dignity. He fought in eight tournaments as yokozuna, retiring after the January 1922 basho.

After retirement he ran a tea house in Osaka.

Some of his memorabilia is on display in a museum in Yatomi City.

== Osaka sumo top division record ==
- Osaka sumo existed independently for many years before merging with Tokyo sumo in 1926. 1–2 tournaments were held yearly, though the actual time they were held was often erratic.

Ōnishiki Daigorō
	First	Second
1906	East Maegashira #8; 5–2–1; 1d 1h	East Maegashira #5; 4–1–5
1907	West Maegashira #1; 5–2–1; 2h	West Komusubi; 6–3–1
1908	West Sekiwake; 6–3–1	West Sekiwake; 8–1–1
1909	West Sekiwake; 5–3–2	West Sekiwake; 7–1–2
1910	West Sekiwake; 3–2–3; 1d 1h	West Ōzeki; 5–3–1; 1d
1911	West Ōzeki; 2–3–4; 1d	West Ōzeki; 8–1–1; Unofficial
1912	West Ōzeki; 7–1–1; 1d	Not held
1913	West Ōzeki; 7–2–1	West Ōzeki; 7–2–1; Unofficial
1914	West Ōzeki; 6–1–3	West Ōzeki; 8–0–1; 1d Unofficial
1915	East Ōzeki; 6–2–2	East Ōzeki; 8–0–2; Unofficial
1916	East Ōzeki; 5–2–2; 1h	Not held
1917	East Ōzeki; 8–0; 2h Unofficial	East Ōzeki; 7–1; 1d 1h
1918	West Ōzeki; 8–1; 1h Unofficial	East Yokozuna; 2–4–3; 1d
1919	West Yokozuna; 1–1–8	West Yokozuna; 6–2; 2d
1920	West Yokozuna; 1–1–8	East Yokozuna; 4–3; 2d 1h
1921	Sat out	East Yokozuna; 4–0–5; 1d
1922	West Yokozuna; 3–2–4; 1d	Retired –
Record given as win-loss-absent Top Division Champion Top Division Runner-up Retired Lower Divisions Key:d=Draw(s) (引分); h=Hold(s) (預り); Divisions: Makuuchi — Jūryō — Makushita — Sandanme — Jonidan — Jonokuchi Makuuchi ranks: Yokozuna — Ōzeki — Sekiwake — Komusubi — Maegashira

*Championships for the best record in a tournament were not recognised or awarded in Osaka sumo before its merger with Tokyo sumo, and the unofficial championships above are historically conferred. For more information, see yūshō.

== See also ==
- Glossary of sumo terms
- List of past sumo wrestlers
- List of sumo tournament top division champions
- List of yokozuna

Preceded by Tochigiyama Moriya	28th Yokozuna; 1918–1922	Succeeded by Miyagiyama Fukumatsu
Yokozuna is not a successive rank, and more than one wrestler can hold the title at once
