= Dewanohana Yoshitaka =

Sumo wrestler

Personal information
- Native name: 出羽の花 義貴
- Born: Soichi Nomura; 13 May 1951 (age 75) Nakasato, Aomori, Japan
- Height: 1.85 m (6 ft 1 in)
- Weight: 122 kg (269 lb)

Sport
- Sport: Sumo
- Retired: January, 1988
- Heya: Dewanoumi
- Record: 572-586-6
- Debut: March, 1974
- Highest rank: Sekiwake (March, 1982)
- Elder name: Dekiyama
- Championships: 1 (Jūryō)
- Special Prizes: Outstanding Performance (1); Fighting Spirit (5); Technique (4)
- Gold Stars: 2 Wakanohana II; Takanosato
- Updated on Sep. 2012

Dewanohana Yoshitaka (born 13 May 1951 as Soichi Nomura) is a former sumo wrestler from Nakasato, Aomori, Japan. He made his professional debut in July 1974, and reached the top division in November 1977. His highest rank was sekiwake. He retired in January 1988 and became an elder in the Japan Sumo Association under the name Dekiyama. Upon reaching the mandatory retirement age of 65 in May 2016 he was re-hired by the Sumo Association for five years as a consultant.

== Career ==
Nomura was an amateur champion at Nihon University, earning the amateur yokozuna title, and on entering professional sumo he was given makushita tsukedashi status, allowing him to begin at the bottom of the makushita division. He joined Dewanoumi stable, which was recommended to him by his cousin, a former wrestler at the stable named Dewanohana Yoshihide, and fought his first bout in March 1974. He had a losing record or make-koshi in his debut tournament, and was demoted to the sandanme division. However, five consecutive winning records in his next five tournaments saw him promoted to the jūryō division in May 1975, whereupon his changed his shikona or fighting name from Nomura to Dewanohana. He weighed barely more than 100 kilos and initially struggled as a sekitori, falling back to makushita for five tournaments. Upon his return to jūryō he won the division championship or yūshō with an 11–4 record. In November 1977 he was promoted to the top makuuchi division.

Dewanohana was to spend 62 consecutive tournaments in the top division, compiling a record of 441 wins against 483 losses, with 6 injury absences. He received ten sanshō or special prizes, one for Outstanding Performance, five for Fighting Spirit and four for Technique. He earned two kinboshi or gold stars for defeating a yokozuna when ranked as a maegashira. (He also defeated Kitanoumi twice at sekiwake rank.) His best performance in a tournament was in January 1985 when he was runner-up to Chiyonofuji with an 11–4 record in the first tournament held in the new Ryōgoku Kokugikan. His first appearance in the sanyaku ranks was at komusubi in November 1979, and he spent a total of 19 tournaments in sanyaku, 12 at komusubi and seven at sekiwake. He held the sekiwake rank for four straight tournaments in 1982 but failed to mount a challenge for ōzeki promotion, falling to 6–9 in September 1982. His last appearance in the sanyaku ranks came in September 1987 at the age of 36, where he could only score three wins against twelve losses. He retired just two tournaments later in January 1988, rather than face demotion to jūryō.

== Retirement from sumo ==
He remained in sumo as an elder of the Japan Sumo Association, and worked as a coach at Dewanoumi stable. His elder name for the whole of his post-retirement career was Dekiyama Oyakata. He was a judge of tournament bouts and joined the Sumo Association's executive board in 2014, managing the public relations department. He reached the mandatory retirement age for elders of 65 in 2016, but was re-employed as a consultant for a period of five years on reduced pay, ending upon his 70th birthday in 2021.

== Fighting style ==
Dewanohana was a yotsu-sumo wrestler who grappled rather than pushed, and was noted for his skill on the mawashi. His most common winning kimarite were yorikiri (force out) and uwatenage (overarm throw), and he also liked to employ the rare move komatosukui (over thigh scooping body drop). Among his most memorable rivalries were with Wakashimazu (with whom he had a 15–14 win/loss record in the top division) and Takanosato (12–16).

== Career record ==
Dewanohana Yoshitaka
Year	January Hatsu basho, Tokyo	March Haru basho, Osaka	May Natsu basho, Tokyo	July Nagoya basho, Nagoya	September Aki basho, Tokyo	November Kyūshū basho, Fukuoka
1974	x	Makushita tsukedashi #60; 3–4	East Sandanme #11; 5–2	West Makushita #49; 6–1	East Makushita #18; 6–1	East Makushita #5; 4–3
1975	East Makushita #4; 4–3	East Makushita #3; 5–2	East Jūryō #13; 8–7	West Jūryō #11; 9–6	East Jūryō #8; 6–9	West Jūryō #11; 8–7
1976	West Jūryō #7; 6–9	East Jūryō #11; 9–6	West Jūryō #6; 3–12	West Makushita #1; 4–3	East Makushita #1; 3–4	East Makushita #5; 4–3
1977	East Makushita #4; 4–3	West Makushita #2; 5–2	East Jūryō #13; 11–4; Champion	East Jūryō #3; 8–7	East Jūryō #1; 10–5	West Maegashira #10; 7–8
1978	East Maegashira #11; 8–7	West Maegashira #7; 5–10	East Maegashira #13; 8–7	West Maegashira #9; 10–5; F	East Maegashira #2; 6–9	West Maegashira #5; 7–8
1979	West Maegashira #6; 6–9	East Maegashira #8; 5–10	West Maegashira #12; 8–7	West Maegashira #11; 10–5; F	East Maegashira #2; 8–7 ★	West Komusubi #1; 3–12
1980	East Maegashira #6; 9–6	West Komusubi #1; 4–11	West Maegashira #5; 7–8	East Maegashira #6; 7–8	East Maegashira #7; 8–7	East Maegashira #2; 5–10
1981	West Maegashira #8; 7–8	West Maegashira #8; 8–7	East Maegashira #5; 7–8	West Maegashira #6; 9–3–3	East Maegashira #2; 6–9	East Maegashira #6; 10–5
1982	West Komusubi #1; 10–5	East Sekiwake #1; 9–6; OT	East Sekiwake #1; 11–4; T	East Sekiwake #1; 8–7	West Sekiwake #1; 6–9	West Maegashira #11; 9–6
1983	East Komusubi #1; 7–8	East Maegashira #1; 11–4; T	West Sekiwake #1; 8–7; F	East Sekiwake #1; 7–8	West Sekiwake #1; 3–12	West Maegashira #5; 7–8
1984	West Maegashira #6; 10–5; T	East Komusubi #1; 7–8	West Komusubi #1; 5–10	East Maegashira #6; 7–5–3	East Maegashira #7; 9–6	West Maegashira #1; 4–11
1985	West Maegashira #9; 11–4; F	West Komusubi #1; 3–12	West Maegashira #7; 9–6	West Maegashira #1; 5–10	West Maegashira #4; 7–8 ★	East Maegashira #6; 9–6
1986	East Komusubi #1; 6–9	West Maegashira #1; 9–6	East Komusubi #1; 3–12	West Maegashira #5; 9–6	East Komusubi #1; 3–12	West Maegashira #5; 10–5
1987	East Komusubi #1; 5–10	East Maegashira #4; 6–9	East Maegashira #7; 6–9	East Maegashira #10; 11–4; F	West Komusubi #1; 3–12	East Maegashira #5; 6–9
1988	West Maegashira #7; Retired; 4–11	x	x	x	x	x
Record given as wins–losses–absences Top division champion Top division runner-up Retired Non-participation Jūryō Lower divisions Sanshō key: F=Fighting spirit; O=Outstanding performance; T=Technique Also shown: ★=Kinboshi; P=Playoff(s); Divisions: Makuuchi — Jūryō — Makushita — Sandanme — Jonidan — Jonokuchi Makuuchi ranks: Yokozuna — Ōzeki — Sekiwake — Komusubi — Maegashira

== See also ==
- Glossary of sumo terms
- List of past sumo wrestlers
- List of sumo elders
- List of sumo tournament top division runners-up
- List of sumo tournament second division champions
- List of sekiwake
