= Washūyama Yoshikazu =

Japanese sumo wrestler

Personal information
- Native name: 鷲羽山 佳和
- Born: Yoshikazu Sukui; 2 April 1949 (age 77) Okayama, Japan
- Height: 1.75 m (5 ft 9 in)
- Weight: 110 kg (240 lb)

Sport
- Sport: Sumo
- Retired: November, 1985
- Heya: Dewanoumi
- Record: 699-650-83
- Debut: March, 1967
- Highest rank: Sekiwake (May, 1976)
- Elder name: Dewanoumi
- Championships: 3 (Jūryō)
- Special Prizes: Fighting Spirit (3); Technique (5)
- Gold Stars: 2 (Kotozakura, Kitanoumi)
- Updated on Feb 2015

Washūyama Yoshikazu (born 2 April 1949 as Yoshikazu Sukui) is a former sumo wrestler from Kurashiki, Okayama, Japan. He joined sumo in 1967 and reached the top makuuchi division in 1973. His highest rank was sekiwake. After his retirement in 1985 he became an elder of the Japan Sumo Association and was the head coach of Dewanoumi stable from 1996 until 2014.

== Career ==
His shikona or sumo name was derived from the Washuzan mountain in his native Okayama prefecture. (He was to become so popular that people would refer to the mountain as Washūyama.) He made his professional debut in March 1967, reaching the second highest jūryō division in July 1972. He was promoted to the makuuchi division in May 1973 and made an immediate impression, finishing as the tournament runner-up with 11 wins and earning the Fighting Spirit prize. However, injury problems over the next couple of years prevented him from progressing much further and he was demoted back to the jūryō division on two occasions. His fortunes turned around towards the end of 1975 when he won his second Fighting Spirit prize, and in January 1976 he was once again tournament runner-up. This earned him promotion to the titled san'yaku ranks for the first time in March 1976 at the rank of komusubi. Another strong showing earned him immediate promotion to sekiwake, which was to be his highest rank.

In 1982 Washūyama dropped to the jūryō division once more, although he kept on fighting until November 1985 when he finally announced his retirement at the age of 36.

== Fighting style ==
Washuyama was one of the lightest sumo wrestlers ever seen in the top division, at around 100 kg and rather short at 175 cm. He was very popular with the tournament crowds, earning the nickname of chibikko gangu or "midget gang" for the way he seemed to swarm around his larger opponents attacking from all sides. He became a real nemesis for the giant Hawaiian wrestler Takamiyama, who was nearly twice his size. His technical skill is evidenced by the five Ginosho, or Technique Awards he picked up during his career.

== Retirement from sumo ==
Washūyama remained in the sumo world as a coach at his old stable, under the name Sakaigawa. In 1996 he assumed the Dewanoumi name and took charge of the stable while the previous head, Sadanoyama, became Sakaigawa and concentrated on his role as the Japan Sumo Association chairman. Washūyama was also on the Sumo Association's board as a director. He reached the mandatory retirement age for an oyakata of 65 in April 2014 and handed over control of the stable to former maegashira Oginohana. In March 2018 he was appointed as a hyōgiin or outside voter in the Sumo Association, although he has no oyakata status.

== Top division record ==
Washūyama Yoshikazu
Year	January Hatsu basho, Tokyo	March Haru basho, Osaka	May Natsu basho, Tokyo	July Nagoya basho, Nagoya	September Aki basho, Tokyo	November Kyūshū basho, Fukuoka
1967	x	(Maezumo)	West Jonokuchi #22; 6–1–P	East Jonidan #67; 5–2	East Jonidan #20; 5–2	East Sandanme #85; 5–2
1968	West Sandanme #54; 4–3	East Sandanme #42; 3–4	West Sandanme #55; 2–5	West Sandanme #71; 3–4	West Sandanme #80; 5–2	West Sandanme #47; 4–3
1969	East Sandanme #36; 6–1	East Sandanme #2; 3–4	West Sandanme #7; 5–2	East Makushita #44; 3–4	East Makushita #51; 4–3	West Makushita #40; 5–2
1970	West Makushita #22; 2–5	West Makushita #32; 2–5	West Makushita #46; 3–4	West Makushita #53; 3–4	East Sandanme #2; 6–1	East Makushita #35; 6–1–P
1971	East Makushita #14; 0–3–4	West Makushita #43; 3–4	East Makushita #51; 5–2	West Makushita #27; 6–1	East Makushita #8; 4–3	West Makushita #6; 4–3
1972	West Makushita #3; 3–4	West Makushita #5; 4–3	West Makushita #2; 5–1–1	West Jūryō #10; Sat out due to injury 0–0–15	West Jūryō #10; 7–8	East Jūryō #12; 9–6
1973	East Jūryō #7; 9–6	West Jūryō #2; 9–6	West Maegashira #13; 11–4; F	East Maegashira #2; 6–9	West Maegashira #3; 6–9	West Maegashira #6; 7–8
1974	West Maegashira #7; 8–7	East Maegashira #4; 7–8 ★	West Maegashira #5; 2–6–7	East Jūryō #1; 10–5	East Maegashira #10; 7–8	East Maegashira #12; 1–3–11
1975	East Jūryō #9; 8–7	West Jūryō #7; 8–7	East Jūryō #5; 10–5	West Maegashira #12; 8–7	East Maegashira #7; 11–4; F	East Maegashira #1; 5–10 ★
1976	East Maegashira #6; 12–3; T	East Komusubi #1; 10–5; F	East Sekiwake #1; 8–7; T	West Sekiwake #1; 5–10	East Maegashira #3; 7–8	West Maegashira #4; 10–5; T
1977	West Komusubi; 6–9	West Maegashira #1; 6–9	West Maegashira #4; 8–7; T	West Maegashira #1; 9–6; T	West Sekiwake #1; 3–12	East Maegashira #4; 6–9
1978	West Maegashira #8; Sat out due to injury 0–0–15	East Jūryō #7; 8–7	East Jūryō #6; 11–4–P; Champion	East Jūryō #1; 10–5–PP; Champion	East Maegashira #10; 7–8	East Maegashira #11; 8–7
1979	East Maegashira #7; 8–7	East Maegashira #3; 1–6–8	West Maegashira #13; 4–11	East Jūryō #4; 9–6	West Maegashira #14; 8–7	West Maegashira #10; 9–6
1980	West Maegashira #2; 5–10	East Maegashira #6; 9–6	East Maegashira #1; 3–12	West Maegashira #10; 9–6	East Maegashira #6; 8–7	East Maegashira #1; 5–10
1981	West Maegashira #7; 6–9	West Maegashira #10; 10–5	West Maegashira #3; 7–8	West Maegashira #4; 7–8	West Maegashira #4; 8–7	East Maegashira #1; 4–4–7
1982	East Maegashira #10; Sat out due to injury 0–0–15	West Jūryō #4; 6–9	East Jūryō #9; 7–8	East Jūryō #10; 9–6	West Jūryō #4; 5–10	West Jūryō #9; 10–5
1983	West Jūryō #1; 7–8	East Jūryō #3; 11–4; Champion	West Maegashira #11; 7–8	West Maegashira #12; 6–9	West Jūryō #3; 9–6	East Jūryō #1; 10–5
1984	East Maegashira #11; 5–10	East Jūryō #2; 8–7	West Jūryō #1; 10–5	West Maegashira #11; 6–9	West Jūryō #1; 8–7	East Jūryō #1; 6–9
1985	East Jūryō #7; 6–9	West Jūryō #8; 10–5	East Jūryō #4; 7–8	East Jūryō #6; 7–8	East Jūryō #7; 6–9	West Jūryō #11; Retired; 6–9
Record given as wins–losses–absences Top division champion Top division runner-up Retired Lower divisions Non-participation Sanshō key: F=Fighting spirit; O=Outstanding performance; T=Technique Also shown: ★=Kinboshi; P=Playoff(s); Divisions: Makuuchi — Jūryō — Makushita — Sandanme — Jonidan — Jonokuchi Makuuchi ranks: Yokozuna — Ōzeki — Sekiwake — Komusubi — Maegashira

== See also ==
- Glossary of sumo terms
- List of sumo tournament top division runners-up
- List of sumo tournament second division champions
- List of past sumo wrestlers
- List of sekiwake
