= Dewanoumi stable =

Organization of sumo wrestlers

Coordinates: 35.6924°N 139.7926°E

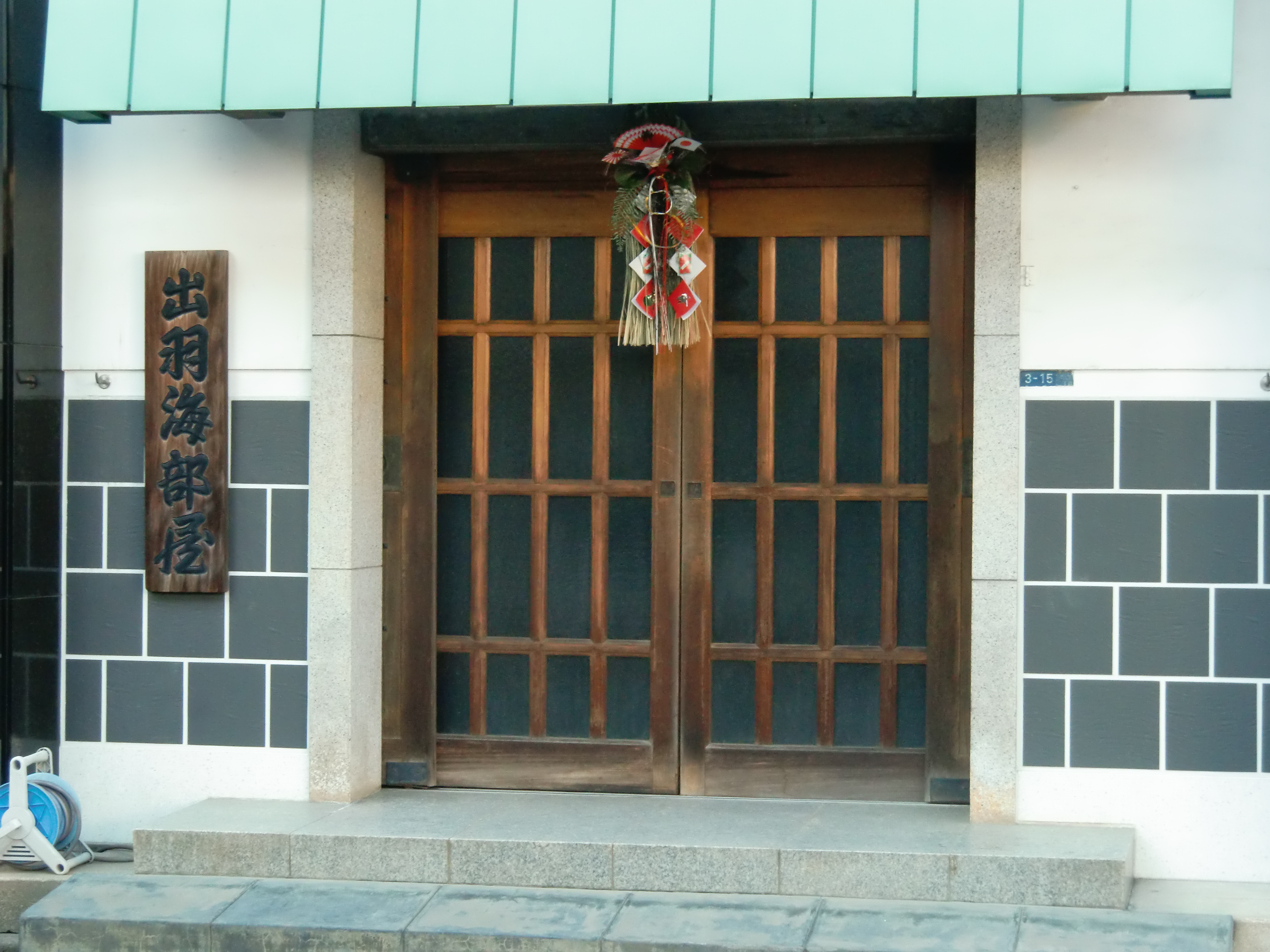
Entrance to Dewanoumi stable

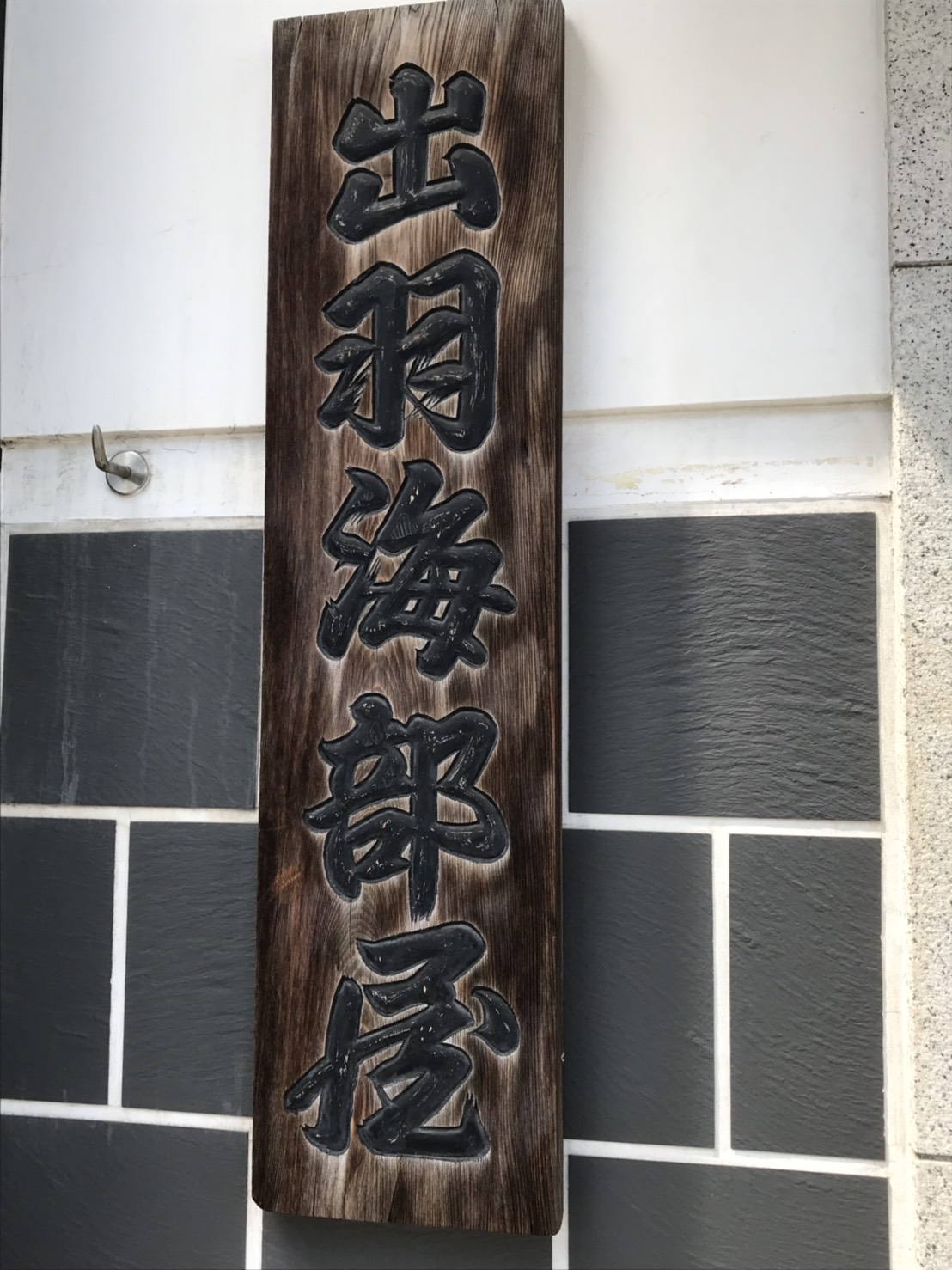

Dewanoumi stable (出羽海部屋, Dewanoumi-beya) is a stable of sumo wrestlers, part of the Dewanoumi ichimon or group of stables. It has a long, prestigious history. Its current head coach is former maegashira Oginohana.

As of May 2026, the stable has 16 active wrestlers.

== History ==
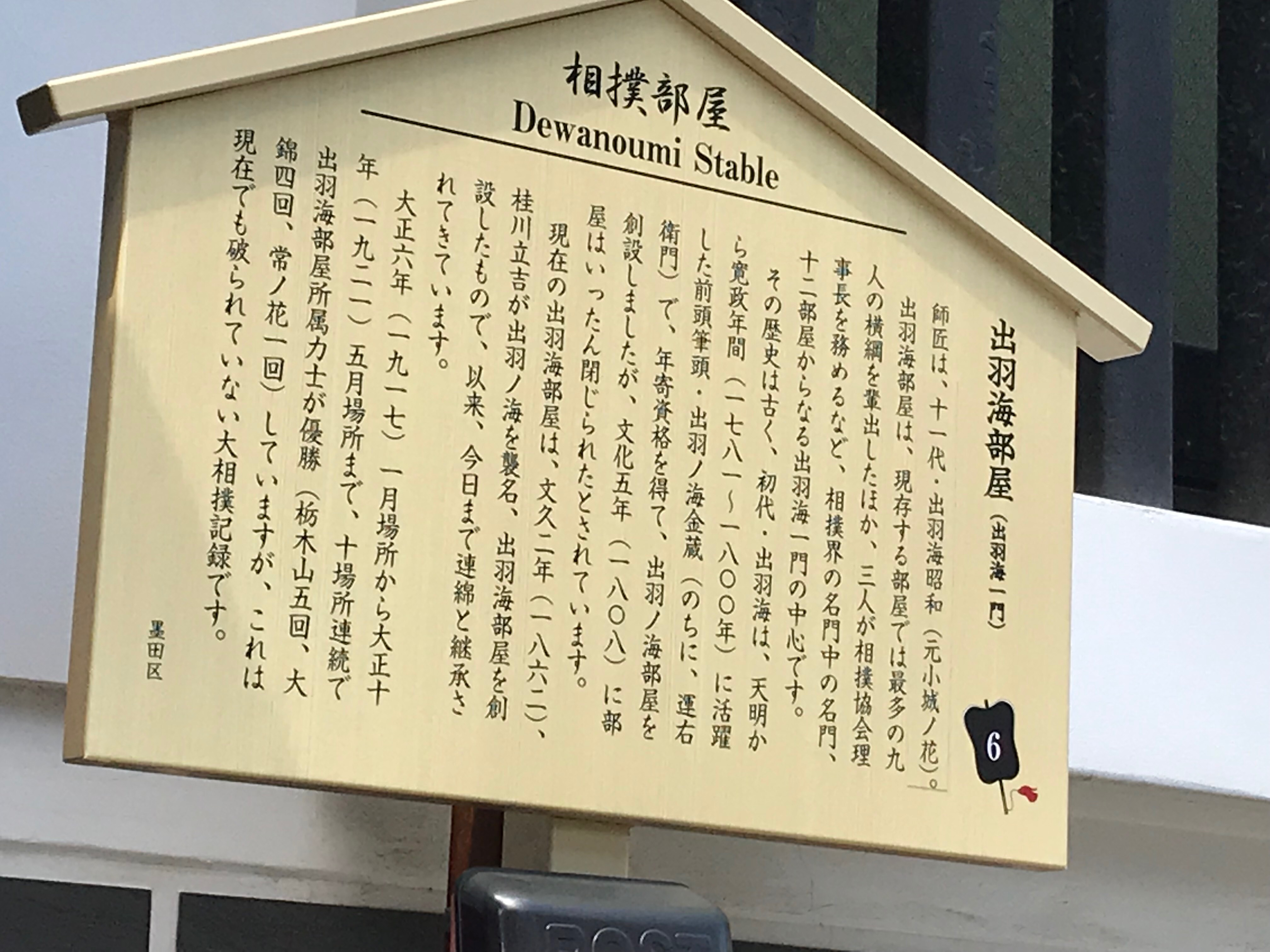
Sign detailing background of the stable

The stable's rise to prominence was due to the 19th yokozuna Hitachiyama, who transformed it from a minor stable when he joined sumo into a powerful recruiting house when he retired in 1914 and became its head coach. Under his leadership the stable produced three yokozuna, Ōnishiki, Tochigiyama and Tsunenohana, ōzeki Kyushuzan, Tsushimanada, Ōnosato, and Hitachiiwa, and 20 other top division wrestlers. At its peak the stable contained over 200 wrestlers, and Hitachiyama's refusal to allow any of his disciples to break away and form new stables when they retired ensured its dominance remained after his death in 1922 at the age of 48. The 57th yokozuna Mienoumi was the first Dewanoumi stable member to be permitted to branch out and open a new stable, which he did in 1981 with Musashigawa stable. (A previous yokozuna from the stable, Chiyonoyama, had been thrown out of the Dewanoumi ichimon in 1967 after setting up Kokonoe stable). Long time head Sadanoyama stood down in 1996, passing control over to former sekiwake Washūyama.

The demotion of Futen'ō to the makushita division in July 2010 left the stable without any sekitori (wrestlers in the salaried divisions) for the first time since 1898. This continued until Dewahayate was promoted to the jūryō division for the November 2014 tournament (in which he managed only five wins and was immediately demoted). In January 2015 the stable saw former maegashira Towanoyama announce his retirement, leaving Dewaōtori and the 44-year-old Dewanosato, with four tournaments in jūryō between them, as the only other wrestlers apart from Dewahayate with any sekitori experience. However shortly afterwards the stable recruited former amateur yokozuna Mitakeumi who quickly made jūryō in July 2015 and the top makuuchi division in January 2016. In July 2017 he became the first member of the stable to reach sekiwake rank since 1982, and in July 2018 the first to win a top division championship for the stable since Mienoumi in 1980. In January 2022, Mitakeumi won his third top division yūshō, and was promoted to ōzeki.

== People ==
=== Ring name conventions ===
Many wrestlers at this stable take ring names or shikona that begin with the characters 出羽 (read: dewa), which are taken from the first two characters of the stable's name.

=== Owners ===
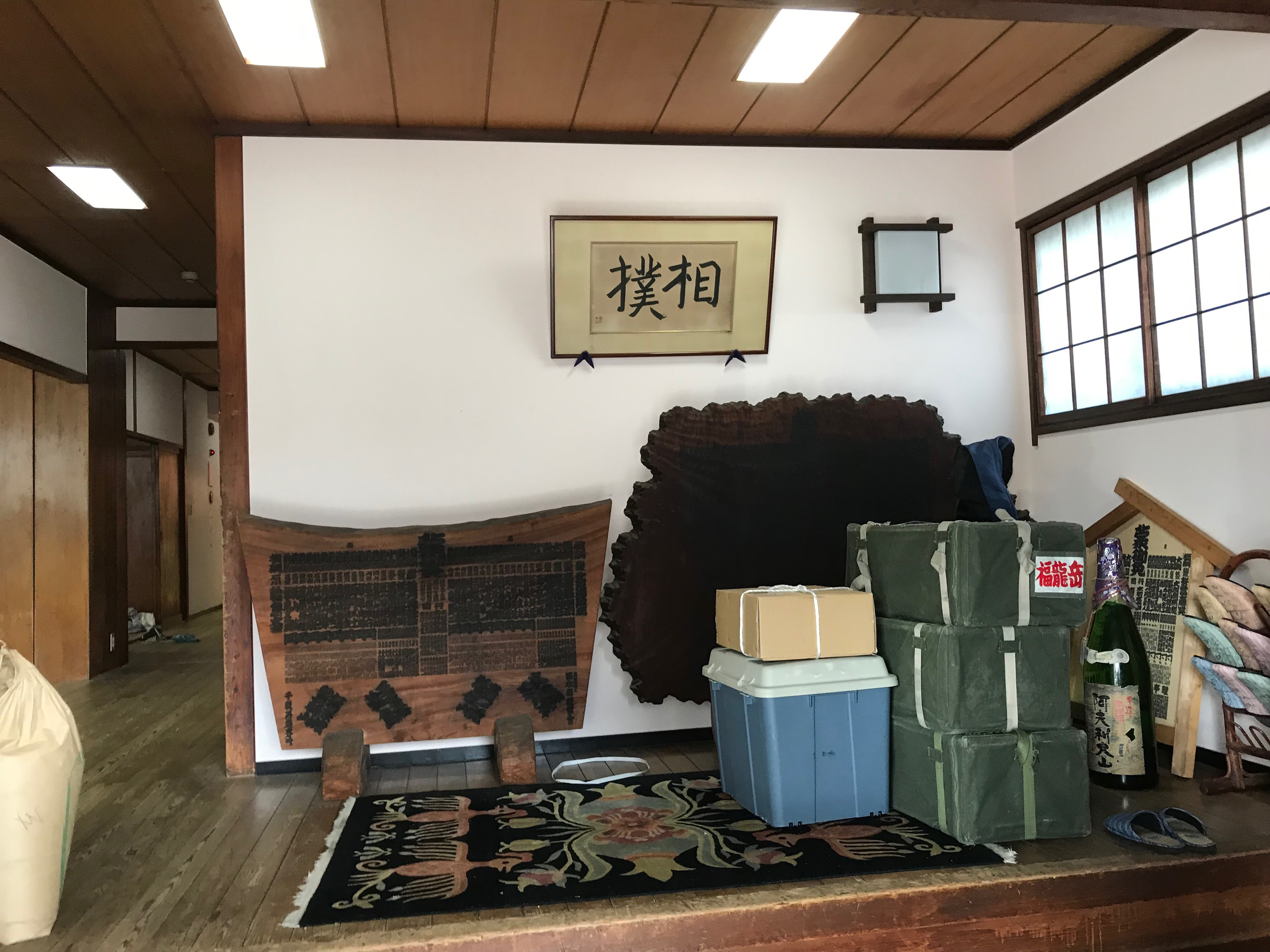
The genkan of Dewanoumi stable

- 2014–present: 11th Dewanoumi Akikazu (riji, maegashira Oginohana)
- 1996–2014: 10th Dewanoumi Yoshikazu (riji, sekiwake Washūyama)
- 1968–1996: 9th Dewanoumi Tomotaka (the 50th yokozuna Sadanoyama)
- 1960–1968: 8th Dewanoumi Yoshihide (maegashira Dewanohana)
- 1949–1960: 7th Dewanoumi Hidemitsu (the 31st yokozuna Tsunenohana)
- 1922–1949: 6th Dewanoumi Kajinosuke (komusubi Ryōgoku)
- 1914–1922: 5th Dewanoumi Taniemon (the 19th yokozuna Hitachiyama)
- 1890–1914: 4th Dewanoumi Unemon (maegashira Hitachiyama)
- c. 1862–1890: 3rd Dewanoumi (makushita Katsuragawa)

=== Coaches ===
- Nakadachi Yasuteru (fuku-riji, komusubi Oginishiki)
- Takasaki Ryūsui (iin, maegashira Kinkaiyama)

=== Notable wrestlers ===
==== Active ====
- Mitakeumi (best rank: ōzeki)
- Dewanoryū (best rank maegashira)

==== Former ====
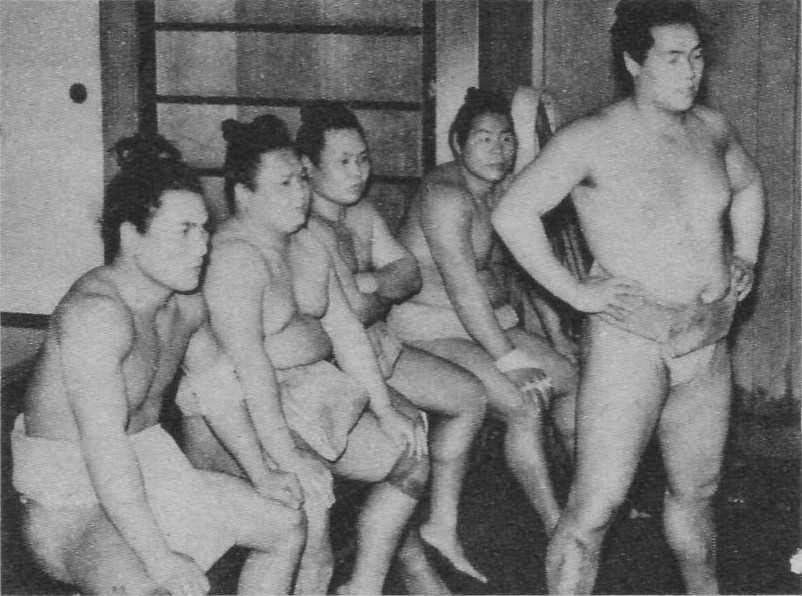
The 37th Yokozuna Akinoumi (far right) training at Dewanoumi stable in 1937

- Hitachiyama (the 19th yokozuna)
- Ōnishiki (the 26th yokozuna)
- Tochigiyama (the 27th yokozuna)
- Tsunenohana (the 31st yokozuna)
- Musashiyama (the 33rd yokozuna)
- Akinoumi (the 37th yokozuna)
- Chiyonoyama (the 41st yokozuna)
- Sadanoyama (the 50th yokozuna)
- Mienoumi (the 57th yokozuna)
- Hitachiiwa (ōzeki)
- Shionoumi (ōzeki)
- Masuiyama (ōzeki)
- Ryōgoku (sekiwake)
- Tenryū (sekiwake)
- Dewaminato (sekiwake)
- Dewanohana (sekiwake)
- Ōnishiki (komusubi)
- Mainoumi (komusubi)
- Dewanohana (maegashira 1)
- Kushimaumi (maegashira 1)

=== Assistant ===
- Kairyū (sewanin, makushita, real name Yudai Yamasaki)

=== Referee ===
- Kimura Chishū (jūryō gyōji, real name Ryōta Kobayashi)

=== Usher ===
- Yōhei (jūryō yobidashi, real name Yōhei Kadooka)

=== Hairdressers ===
- Tokoriki (third class tokoyama)
- Tokosora (fifth class tokoyama)

== Location and access ==
Tokyo, Sumida Ward, Ryōgoku 2-3-15
7 minute walk from Ryōgoku Station on Sōbu Line

== See also ==
- List of sumo stables
- List of active sumo wrestlers
- List of past sumo wrestlers
- Glossary of sumo terms
