= Hitachiyama Taniemon =

Japanese sumo wrestler

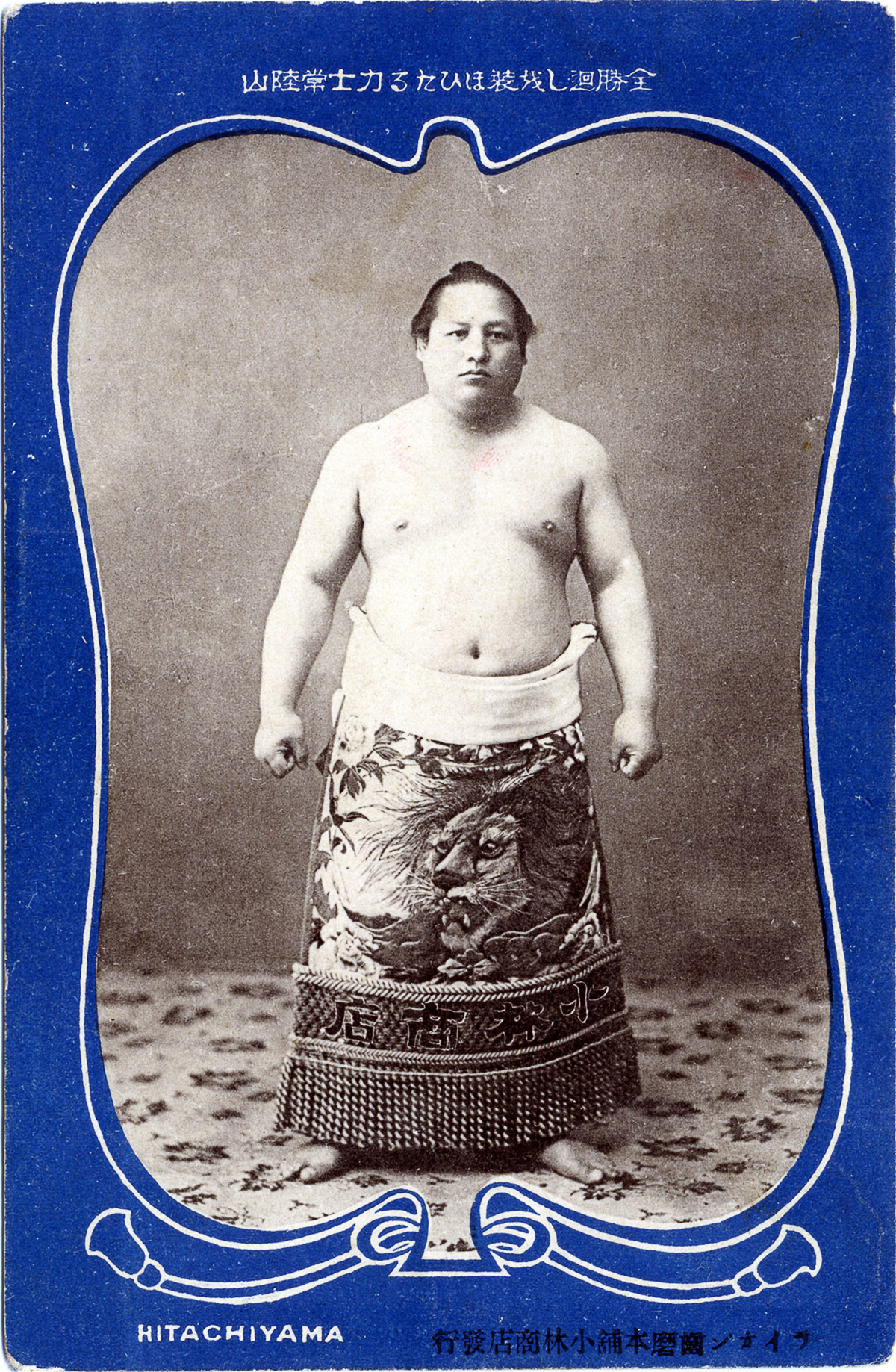
- Hitachiyama in 1903

Personal information
- Native name: 常陸山 谷右衞門
- Born: Ichige Tani; January 19, 1874 Mito, Ibaragi, Japan
- Died: June 19, 1922 (aged 48)
- Height: 1.74 m (5 ft 8 1/2 in)
- Weight: 146 kg (322 lb)

Sport
- Sport: Sumo
- Retired: May, 1914
- Heya: Dewanoumi
- Record: 150-15-131; 22draws-2holds(Makuuchi)
- Debut: June, 1892
- Highest rank: Yokozuna (June, 1903)
- Championships: 1 (Makuuchi, official); 7 (Makuuchi, unofficial)
- Updated on September 2007

Hitachiyama Taniemon (常陸山 谷右衞門; January 19, 1874 – June 19, 1922) was a Japanese professional sumo wrestler from Mito, Ibaraki Prefecture. He was the sport's 19th yokozuna from 1903 till 1914. His great rivalry with Umegatani Tōtarō II created the "Ume-Hitachi Era" and did much to popularise sumo. He is remembered as much for his exploits in promoting the sport as for his strength on the dohyō. In his later years as head coach of Dewanoumi stable he trained hundreds of wrestlers, including three yokozuna. Many consider him the most honorable yokozuna in sumo history, which earned him the nickname "Kakusei" (角聖), or "sumo saint".

== Early career ==
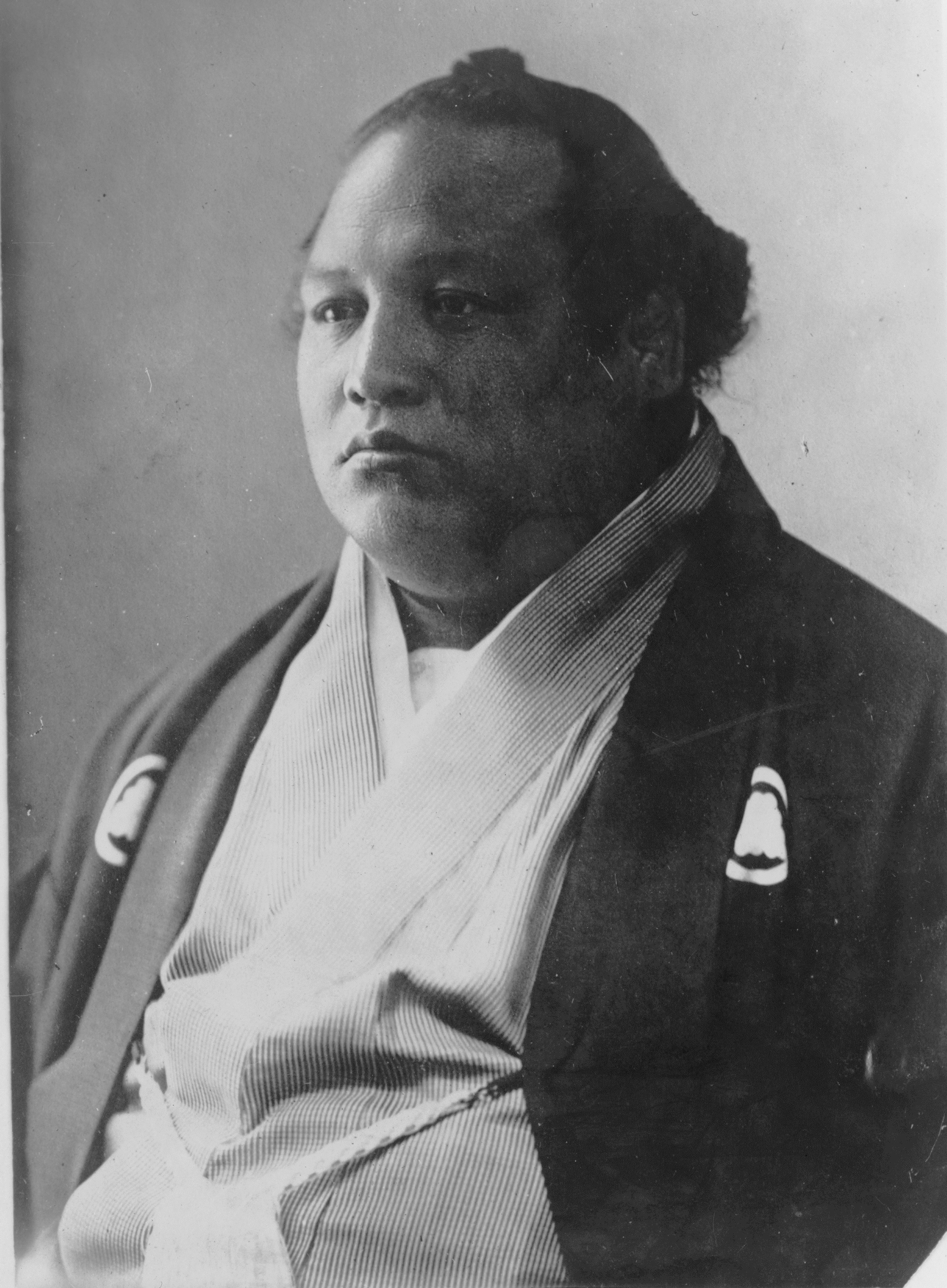
Hitachiyama in New York, 1907

Hitachiyama was born as Ichige Tani (市毛 谷), on January 19, 1874, to a samurai family which belonged to the Mito Domain. His family was dismissed by the Meiji restoration authorities and was ruined financially. He moved to Tokyo and became dependent on his uncle. He attempted to enter Waseda University where his uncle was employed. At around this time, however, his uncle observed that he was able to lift a rock weighing 58 kan, or 217.5 kg (480 lb). His uncle advised him to become a sumo wrestler. At that time, sumo was not seen as a sport of much regard, so his father opposed the idea. Despite his father's protestation, he joined Dewanoumi stable in 1890.

He made his professional debut in June 1892. However, he fell in love with his head coach's niece; and when he was refused permission to wed her, he ran away from Tokyo sumo in the summer of 1894. He moved to Nagoya sumo and then Osaka sumo. He returned to Tokyo sumo in the spring of 1896. He had become much stronger during his absence and won 32 consecutive bouts upon his return. In January 1899, he won a championship at his first tournament in the top makuuchi division. In January 1901 he was promoted to ōzeki. He fought against fellow ōzeki Umegatani Tōtarō II on the final day of May 1903 tournament. He defeated Umegatani and his own promotion to yokozuna was confirmed. Hitachiyama, however, insisted that his rival be promoted as well. Hitachiyama got his wish and he and Umegatani were promoted to yokozuna together in June 1903. With Ōzutsu Man'emon also holding the rank, it was the first occasion that three yokozuna were active at the same time.

== Yokozuna ==
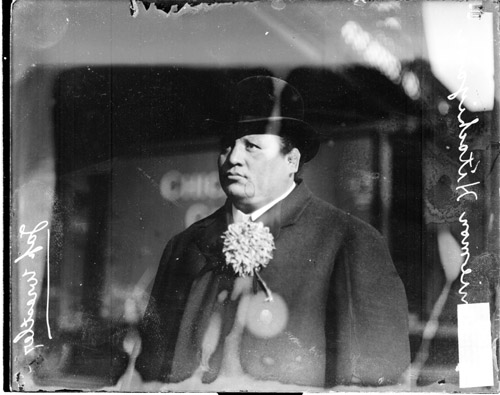
Hitachiyama in Chicago, 1907

Hitachiyama once won 27 bouts in a row, lost one to Araiwa Kamenosuke in his first tournament as yokozuna, then went on another winning streak of 32 bouts. However, he was determined to see sumo held in higher regard within Japanese society, a task he saw as more important than merely winning bouts. In August 1907, he went on a tour of the United States of America and Europe. He met President Theodore Roosevelt and performed the yokozuna dohyō-iri (the yokozuna ring-entering ceremony) in the White House. Although absent from the January 1908 tournament due to the journey, nobody criticized Hitachiyama as he was seen as a visionary and a pioneer for sumo. After his return from the long journey he was not quite as dominant as he had been before, although he still managed to win a title in the first Ryōgoku Kokugikan, which opened in 1909 and which he had helped to build.

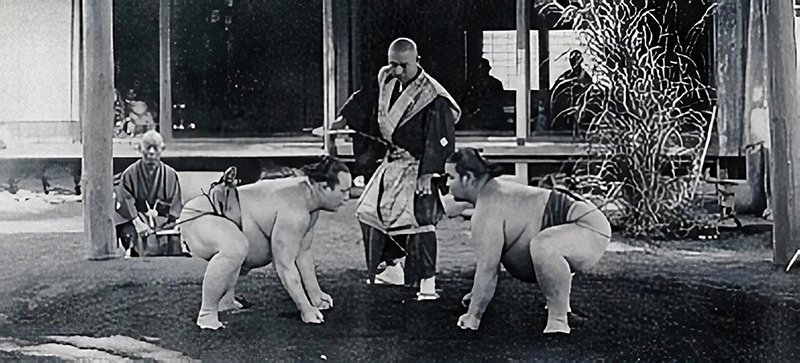
Hitachiyama and Umegatani

In the top makuuchi division, he won 150 bouts and lost only 15 bouts, achieving a winning percentage of 90.9. He is the last yokozuna to have a winning percentage over .900 in the top division. He started his powerful techniques only after his opponents' attack. His fighting style is now seen as a model of yokozuna. He also introduced bushidō into sumo, and raised the status of sumo wrestlers in society. He also performed the yokozuna dohyō-iri in an innovative way. Unlike yokozuna before him, he would at first hold out both arms after he made a clap, and after he did the sumo-style leg stomps, he would raise only his right arm. In the course of his career, he would have the best record in 8 tournaments, but only his last one is counted as an actual championship after the system was established in 1909

== Later years ==
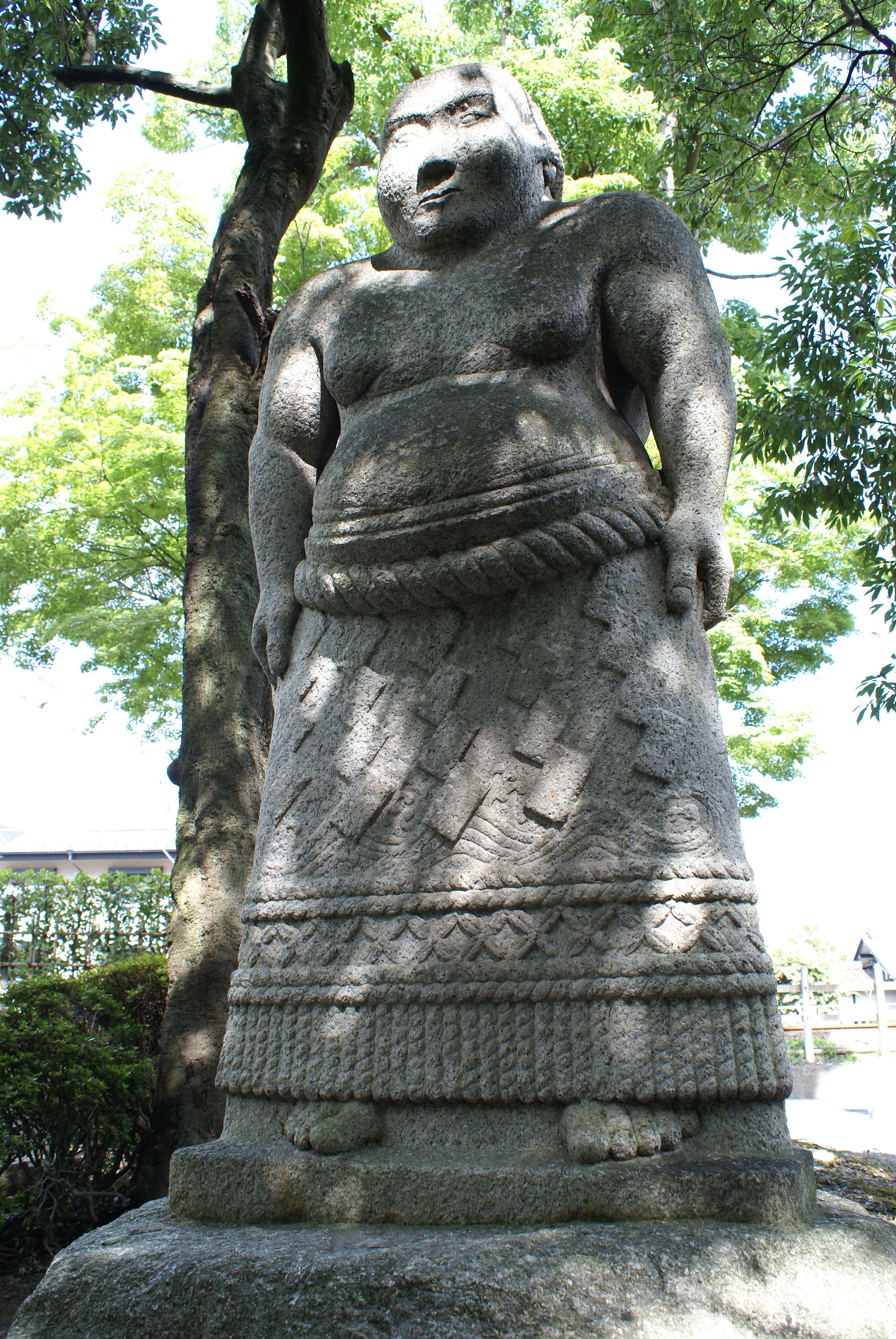
Statue of Hitachiyama in Nagahama, Shiga

After his retirement in May 1914, he became the stablemaster of Dewanoumi stable. It had been a minor heya when he had first joined it, but even while still an active wrestler Hitachiyama had trained many wrestlers, such as later yokozuna Tachiyama Mineemon, even though they were not members of his stable. He was a masterful recruiter and coach. He had such charisma and personality that he was able to tempt many wrestlers away from the less successful Osaka and Kyoto based sumo associations, which caused friction between the rival organisations. As head coach he produced many top division wrestlers, including no fewer than three yokozuna: Ōnishiki Uichirō, Tochigiyama Moriya and Tsunenohana Kan'ichi. At the stable's peak he was in charge of two hundred wrestlers. To feed them, he devised the chankonabe style of food preparation which still prevails in sumo today.

He died suddenly in 1922 at the age of 48. As a much respected figure in the sumo world, he was the first yokozuna for whom the Japan Sumo Association organised a formal funeral. His funeral procession was reportedly 6 kilometres long.

== Top Division Record ==
Hitachiyama
-	Spring	Summer
1899	East Maegashira #4; 8–0–1; 1d Unofficial	Sat out
1900	East Maegashira #1; 7–1–1; 1d	East Sekiwake; 7–1–1; 1d
1901	East Sekiwake; 8–0–1; 1d Unofficial	West Ōzeki; 7–2–1
1902	West Ōzeki; 7–1–2	West Ōzeki; 6–0–4
1903	West Ōzeki; 8–0–1; 1d Unofficial	West Ōzeki; 9–0–1; Unofficial
1904	West Yokozuna; 7–1–2; Unofficial	Sat out
1905	West Yokozuna; 2–0–8	West Yokozuna; 5–0–2; 2d 1h
1906	West Yokozuna; 9–0–1; Unofficial	West Yokozuna; 8–0–2; Unofficial
1907	Sat out	West Yokozuna; 6–2–1; 1d
1908	Sat out for a world tour	West Yokozuna; 5–0–5
1909	East Yokozuna; 6–0–4	East Yokozuna; 7–1; 2d
1910	East Yokozuna; 7–0–1; 2d	East Yokozuna; 2–0–8
1911	East Yokozuna; 5–2; 3d	Sat out
1912	West Yokozuna; 5–1; 4d	Sat out
1913	East Yokozuna; 6–1; 3d	West Yokozuna; 2–0–7; 1h
1914	West Yokozuna; 1–2–7	East Yokozuna; Retired; 0–0–10
Record given as win-loss-absent Top Division Champion Top Division Runner-up Retired Lower Divisions Key:d=Draw(s) (引分); h=Hold(s) (預り); Divisions: Makuuchi — Jūryō — Makushita — Sandanme — Jonidan — Jonokuchi Makuuchi ranks: Yokozuna — Ōzeki — Sekiwake — Komusubi — Maegashira

*Championships for the best record in a tournament were not recognized or awarded before the 1909 summer tournament and the above championships that are labelled "unofficial" are historically conferred. For more information see yūshō.

== See also ==
- Glossary of sumo terms
- List of past sumo wrestlers
- List of sumo tournament top division champions
- List of yokozuna

Preceded by Ōzutsu Man'emon	19th Yokozuna; 1903–1914	Succeeded by Umegatani Tōtarō II
Yokozuna is not a successive rank, and more than one wrestler can hold the title at once
