= Tsunenohana Kan'ichi =

Japanese sumo wrestler

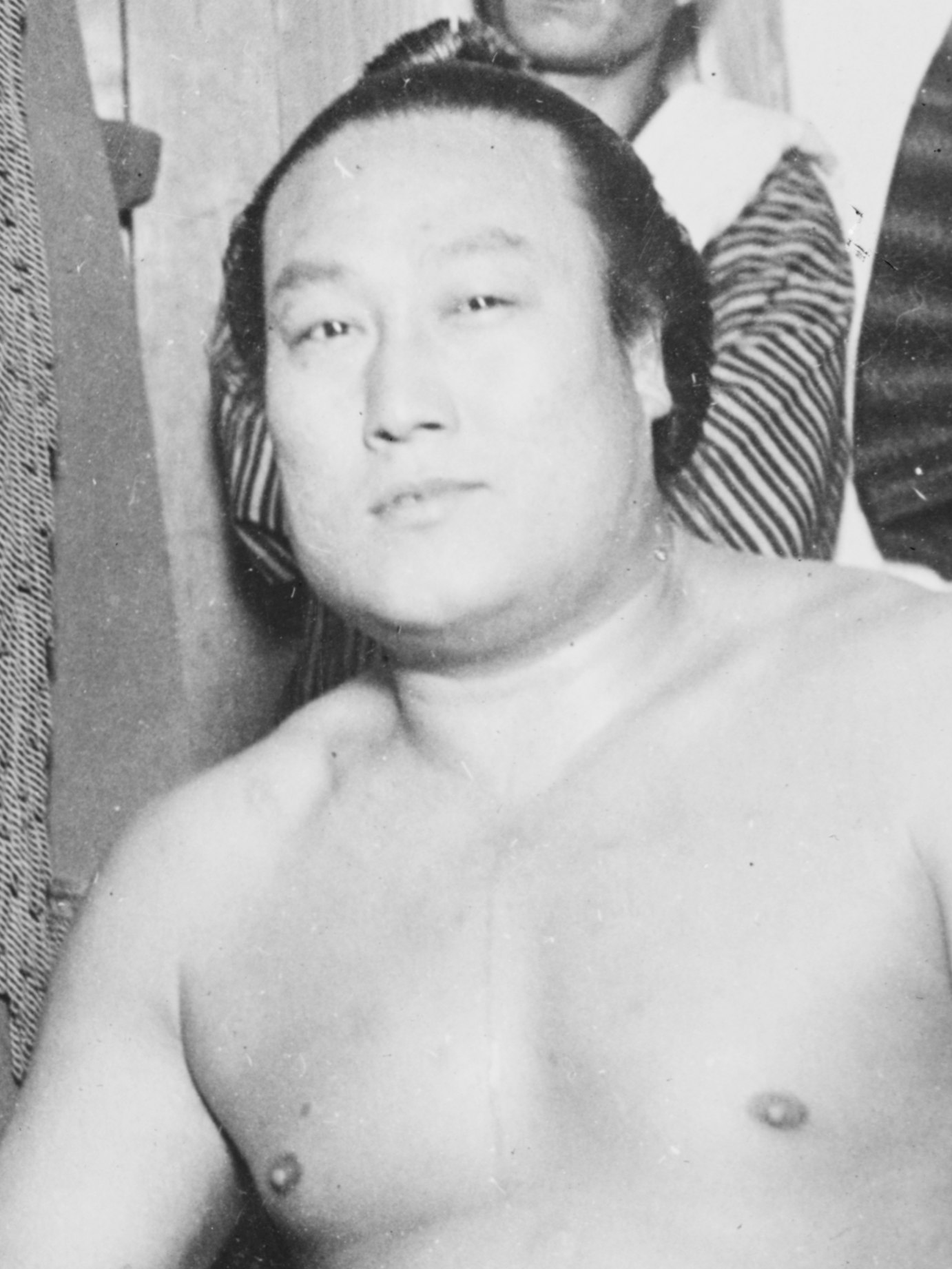
- Tsunenohana Kan'ichi between 1920 and 1925

Personal information
- Native name: 常ノ花 寛市
- Born: Yamanobe Kanichi; November 23, 1896 Okayama, Japan
- Died: November 28, 1960 (aged 64)
- Height: 1.78 m (5 ft 10 in)
- Weight: 115 kg (254 lb)

Sport
- Sport: Sumo
- Retired: October, 1930
- Heya: Dewanoumi
- Record: 263-81-66 (8 draws)
- Debut: January, 1910
- Highest rank: Yokozuna (January, 1924)
- Elder name: Fujishima → Dewanoumi
- Championships: 10 (Makuuchi); 1 (Jūryō)
- Updated on June 2020

Tsunenohana Kan'ichi (Japanese: 常ノ花 寛市; November 23, 1896 – November 28, 1960) was a Japanese professional sumo wrestler from Okayama. He was the sport's 31st yokozuna.

== Career ==
He was born Yamanobe Kanichi (山野辺 寛一). He made his professional debut in January 1910 and reached the top makuuchi division in May 1917. He won his first top division championship in May 1921 from the rank of ōzeki, with a perfect record of ten wins and no losses. After his second championship in May 1923 and a runner-up spot in January 1924, he was promoted to yokozuna. He was to win eight more championships during his yokozuna career, including three in a row in 1927. He was much stronger than his competition and had no serious rivals. As a result, turnout at tournaments tended to be quite poor. His last title came in March 1930. He fought his last bouts in May of that year and officially retired in October. His retirement came very suddenly, as he was at the height of his powers, and it left Miyagiyama as the only yokozuna.

== Retirement ==
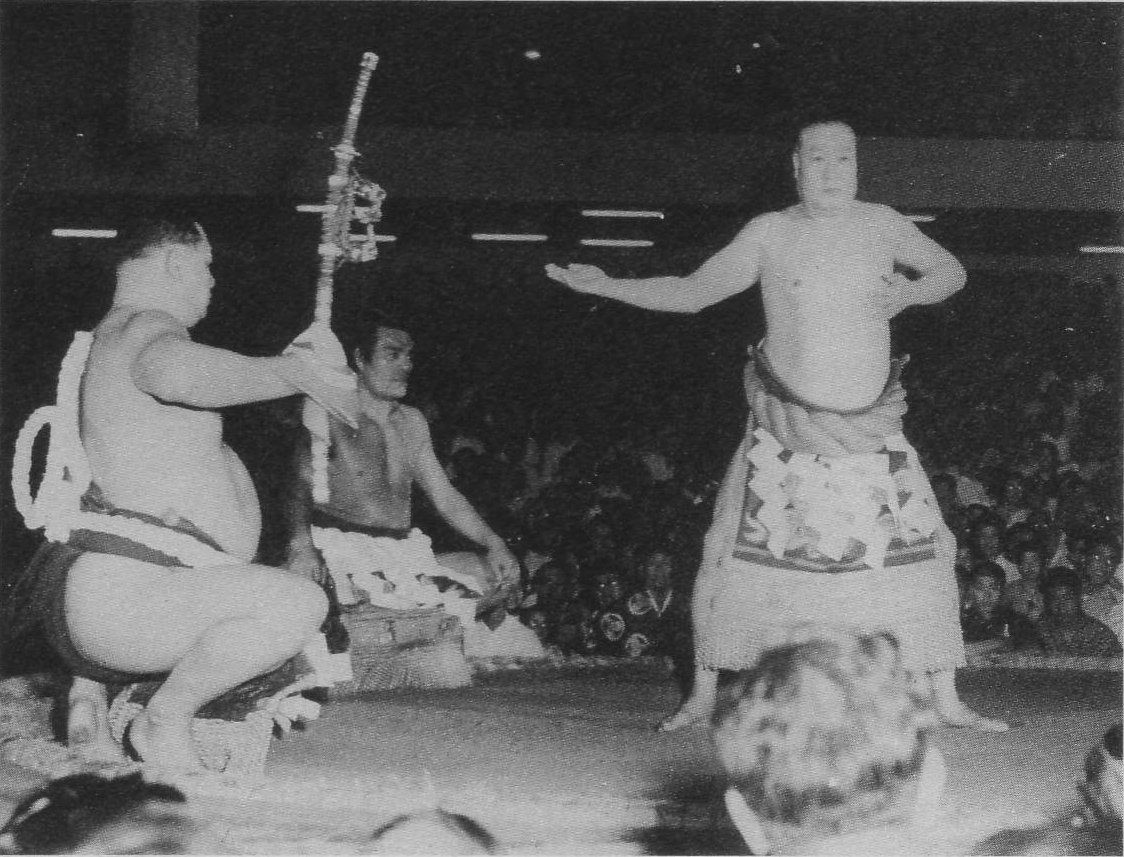
Tsunenohana performs his kanreki dohyō-iri in 1956.

After retiring from active competition in 1930 he became the head of the Dewanoumi stable, initially on an acting basis only, and was known as Fukushima Oyakata. One of his first new recruits was Itsutsushima Narao, who would go on to attain the rank of ōzeki. In 1949 he became the official head coach and the seventh Dewanoumi Oyakata. From 1944 to 1957 was also the chairman of the Sumo Association. During his tenure as chairman, in 1956, he performed his kanreki dohyō-iri or '60th year ring entrance ceremony' to commemorate his years as yokozuna. Later on in his tenure, he began to be blamed for the Sumo Association's problems and attempted to commit suicide by a sword and gas in May 1957. He was rescued, but retired as chairman. He remained the head of Dewanoumi stable until his death in November 1960 at the age of 64.

== Top Division Record ==
- In 1927 Tokyo and Osaka sumo merged and four tournaments a year in Tokyo and other locations began to be held.

Tsunenohana
-	Spring	Summer
1917	x	West Maegashira #12; 6–3; 1h
1918	East Maegashira #4; 5–4–1	East Maegashira #1; 8–1–1
1919	East Sekiwake; 6–3–1	East Sekiwake; 7–2; 1h
1920	East Sekiwake; 6–1–1; 1d 1h	Sat out
1921	West Ōzeki; 9–1	East Ōzeki; 10–0
1922	East Ōzeki; 7–2; 1h	West Ōzeki; 5–4; 1d
1923	East Ōzeki; 4–4; 2d	West Ōzeki; 9–0; 1d 1h
1924	West Ōzeki; 8–2	East Yokozuna; 5–2–1; 2d 1h
1925	East Yokozuna; 0–2–9	West Yokozuna; 3–1–6; 1d
1926	West Yokozuna; 11–0	Sat out
Record given as wins–losses–absences Top division champion Top division runner-up Retired Lower divisions Non-participation Sanshō key: F=Fighting spirit; O=Outstanding performance; T=Technique Also shown: ★=Kinboshi; P=Playoff(s); Divisions: Makuuchi — Jūryō — Makushita — Sandanme — Jonidan — Jonokuchi Makuuchi ranks: Yokozuna — Ōzeki — Sekiwake — Komusubi — Maegashira

-	Spring Haru basho, Tokyo	March Sangatsu basho, varied	Summer Natsu basho, Tokyo	October Jūgatsu basho, varied
1927	West Yokozuna; 7–4	West Yokozuna; 10–1	West Yokozuna; 10–1	East Yokozuna; 10–1
1928	Sat out	West Yokozuna; 10–1	West Yokozuna; 11–0	West Yokozuna; 9–2
1929	East Yokozuna; 4–4–3	Sat out	East Yokozuna; 10–1	East Yokozuna; 8–3
1930	East Yokozuna; 8–3	East Yokozuna; 10–1	East Yokozuna; 5–4	West Yokozuna; Retired –
Record given as win-loss-absent Top Division Champion Top Division Runner-up Retired Lower Divisions Key:d=Draw(s) (引分); h=Hold(s) (預り); Divisions: Makuuchi — Jūryō — Makushita — Sandanme — Jonidan — Jonokuchi Makuuchi ranks: Yokozuna — Ōzeki — Sekiwake — Komusubi — Maegashira

== See also ==
- Glossary of sumo terms
- Kanreki dohyō-iri
- List of past sumo wrestlers
- List of sumo tournament top division champions
- List of yokozuna
- Japan Pro Wrestling Alliance

Preceded by Nishinoumi Kajirō III	31st Yokozuna; 1924–1930	Succeeded by Tamanishiki San'emon
Yokozuna is not a successive rank, and more than one wrestler can hold the title at once

Sporting positions
Preceded by Isamu Takeshita	Chairman of the Japan Sumo Association; 1944–1957	Succeeded by Futabayama Sadaji
