= Ōnishiki Uichirō =

Japanese sumo wrestler

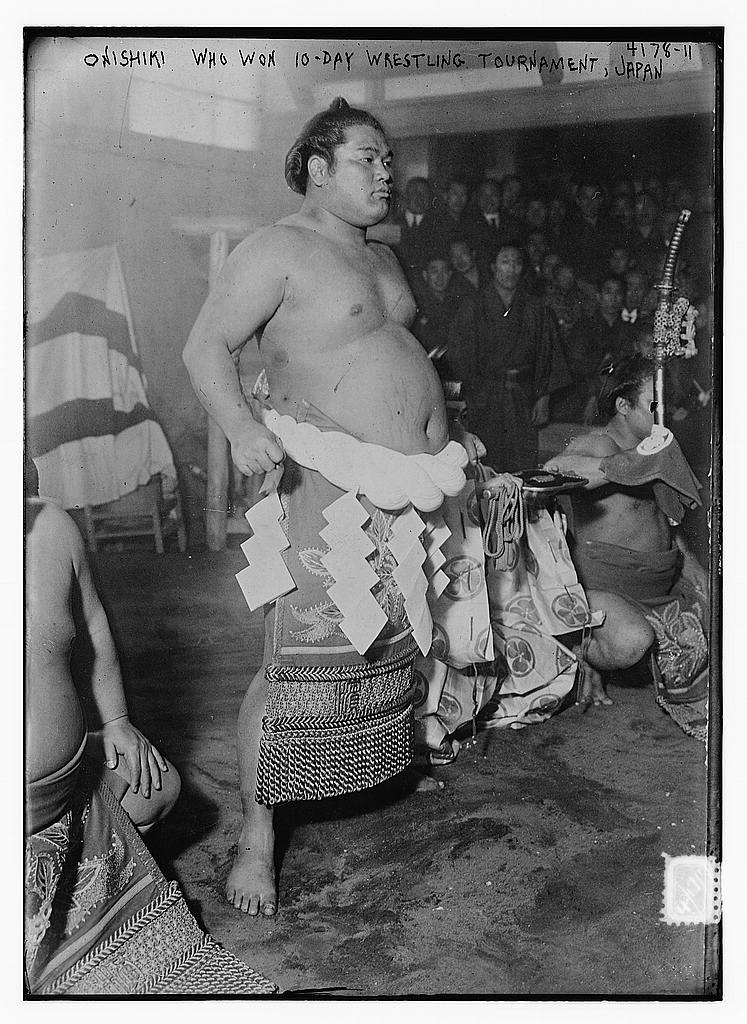
- Ōnishiki, circa 1917

Personal information
- Native name: 大錦 卯一郎
- Born: Hosokawa Uichirō; 25 November 1891 Chūō-ku, Osaka, Japan
- Died: 13 May 1941 (aged 49)
- Height: 1.75 m (5 ft 9 in)
- Weight: 139 kg (306 lb)

Sport
- Sport: Sumo
- Retired: January 1923
- Heya: Dewanoumi
- Record: 119-16-32-3draws (Makuuchi)
- Debut: January 1910
- Highest rank: Yokozuna (May, 1917)
- Championships: 5 (Makuuchi); 1 (Jūryō); 1 (Jonidan)
- Updated on September 2007

Ōnishiki Uichirō (Japanese: 大錦 卯一郎; 25 November 1891 – 13 May 1941) was a Japanese professional sumo wrestler. He was the sport's 26th yokozuna. On 2 November 1922, he became the first yokozuna to perform the yokozuna dohyō-iri at the Meiji Shrine.

== Biography ==
He was born Hosokawa Uichirō (細川 卯一郎), in Osaka on 25 November 1891.

Ōnishiki trained under former yokozuna Hitachiyama Taniemon, joining his Dewanoumi stable. He was promoted to the top makuuchi division in January 1915. After finishing the May 1915 tournament with a 9–1 record at the komusubi rank, he was promoted to ōzeki. He won his first yūshō or championship with a perfect 10–0 record in the January 1917 tournament and was promoted to yokozuna. He reached the top yokozuna rank after only five tournaments, which is the all-time record.

He lost only 16 bouts in his entire career. He won five top division tournament championships and was runner-up in four others. He was very smart in comparison with most sumo wrestlers of his era, and so he was very strong and recorded the high winning percentage of 88.1. He also recorded only three draws.

However, his career suddenly ended. In January 1923, sumo wrestlers went on strike against the Tokyo Sumo Association. The walkout is called the Mikawajima Incident (三河島事件, Mikawajima-Jiken). Ōnishiki attempted to mediate, but failed. After police intervention, the striking wrestlers achieved their demands of better retirement pay. Because he felt responsibility for the incident, Ōnishiki retired from being an active sumo wrestler and left the sumo world. He was critical about tradition in the sumo world.

After his retirement, he entered Waseda University. After the graduation, he worked at the Hochi Shimbun as a sumo essayist. He died on 13 May 1941.

== Top Division Record ==
Onishiki
-	Spring	Summer
1915	East Maegashira #12; 8–1–1	East Komusubi; 9–1
1916	East Ōzeki; 8–2	East Ōzeki; 7–3
1917	West Ōzeki; 10–0	West Yokozuna; 9–1
1918	East Yokozuna; 8–1–1	Sat out
1919	East Yokozuna; 8–2	East Yokozuna; 8–2
1920	East Yokozuna; 8–1; 1d	West Yokozuna; 9–1
1921	West Yokozuna; 10–0	East Yokozuna; 9–0; 1d
1922	Sat out	West Yokozuna #1; 8–1; 1d
1923	East Yokozuna; Retired; 0–0	x
Record given as win-loss-absent Top Division Champion Top Division Runner-up Retired Lower Divisions Key:d=Draw(s) (引分); h=Hold(s) (預り); Divisions: Makuuchi — Jūryō — Makushita — Sandanme — Jonidan — Jonokuchi Makuuchi ranks: Yokozuna — Ōzeki — Sekiwake — Komusubi — Maegashira

== See also ==
- Glossary of sumo terms
- List of past sumo wrestlers
- List of sumo tournament top division champions
- List of sumo tournament second division champions
- List of yokozuna

Preceded by Nishinoumi Kajirō II	26th Yokozuna; 1917–1923	Succeeded by Tochigiyama Moriya
Yokozuna is not a successive rank, and more than one wrestler can hold the title at once
