= Yūshō =

Sports award

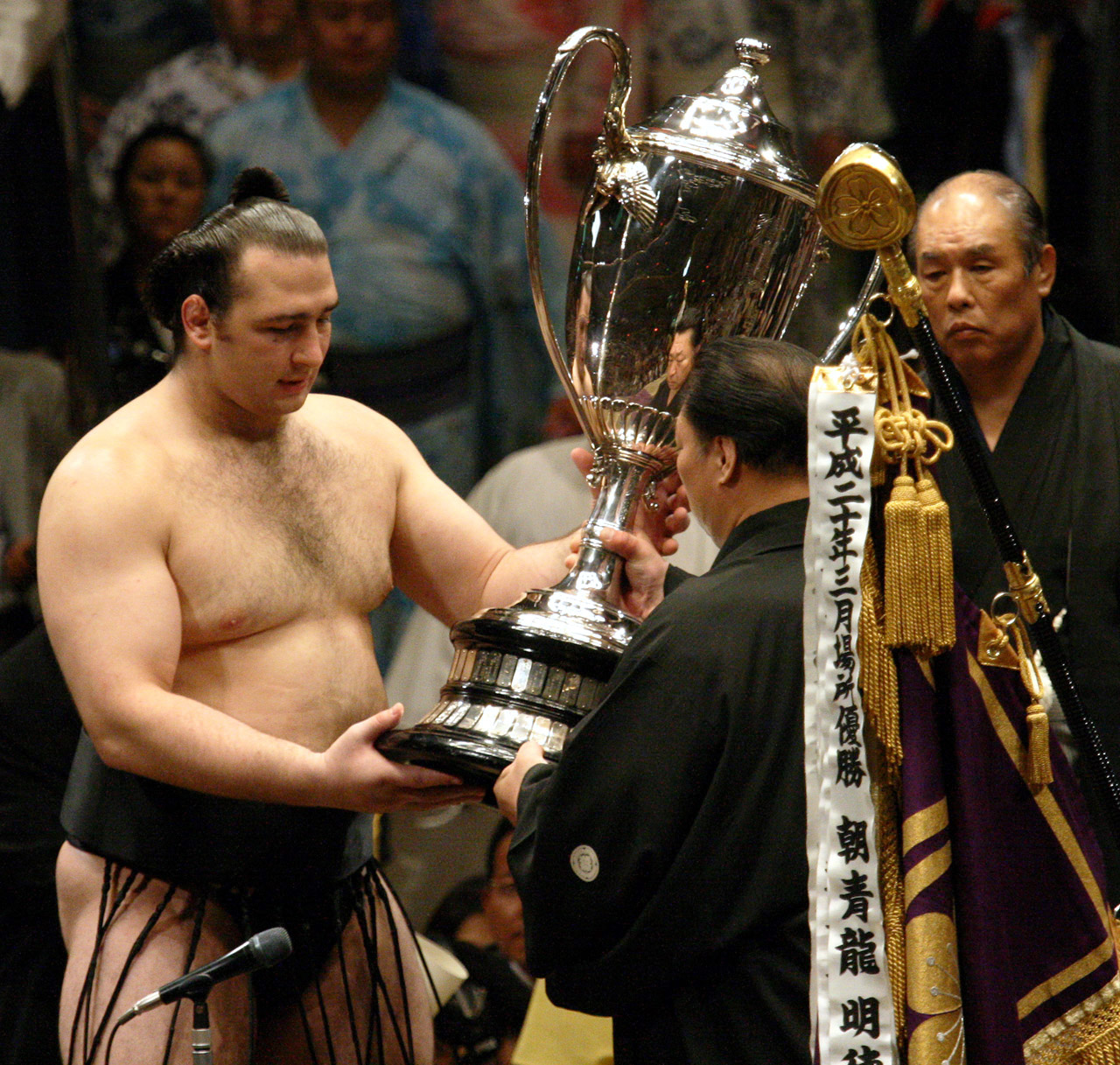
Kotoōshū, winner of the May 2008 yūshō, receives the Emperor's Cup

Yūshō (優勝; victory, championship) is the term for a championship in Japanese. This article focuses on championships in the sport of professional sumo.

It is awarded in each of the six annual honbasho or official tournaments, to the wrestler who wins the most bouts. yūshō are awarded in all six professional sumo divisions. The prize money for a top makuuchi division championship is currently 10 million yen, while for the lowest jonokuchi division the prize is 100,000 yen. A runner-up is referred to as a jun-yūshō.

The individual yūshō idea evolved gradually, from wrestlers simply picking up cash thrown into the ring by spectators after winning matches (common in the Edo period), to wrestlers being given trophies and prizes from private sponsors for performances over an entire tournament (beginning in the Meiji period). Trophies were at first given only for undefeated records, but since draws, no decisions and absences were all possible outcomes, several wrestlers could be eligible and it did not necessarily go to the man with the most wins.

In January 1900, the system recognised today began to take shape when the Osaka Mainichi Shinbun newspaper announced it would give a prize of a keshō-mawashi decorative apron for either an undefeated record or for the fewest losses, and in the event of a tie, the wrestler who had defeated the most high-ranking opponents would win the prize. Thus the principle of an individual champion was established. Takamiyama Torinosuke's victory in June 1909 was the first to be declared a yūshō, and the system was formally recognised by the Japan Sumo Association in 1926 when the Tokyo and Osaka organisations merged.

From June 1909 to October 1931 and from January 1940 to July 1947, there was also a group competition called Tōzai-sei (東西制). The wrestlers were divided into two teams, East and West, and it was the team with the better overall score that was awarded a prize.

Though as noted, all six divisions award a championship, the top division championship receives by far the most attention. Consequently, in addition to their prize money, top division yūshō winners receive the Emperor's Cup (天皇賜杯, Tennō shihai). It was first donated by Hirohito in 1925 as the Prince Regent's cup (摂政宮賜杯, Sesshō-no-miya shihai). It was changed to its current name upon Hirohito's accession to the emperor's throne in December 1926. There is also a banner with the names of past winners. Both are presented by the chairman of the Sumo Association. There are also many prizes and trophies given by prefectural and foreign governments, as well as businesses. For several years the French President Jacques Chirac donated a trophy. The wrestler is given replicas of all the trophies to keep. In July 2010, and again in May 2011, neither the Emperor's Cup nor any other prizes were handed out, because of controversies over illegal betting and match-fixing respectively. However, in both cases the yūshō were still official and counted on the wrestlers' records.

An unbeaten 15–0 score is known as zenshō-yūshō and is fairly rare; most yūshō winning scores are either 14–1 or 13–2; a winning score of 12–3 had been about as rare as a zenshō-yūshō historically, since 2021 has been much more common than a 14–1 however and about as common as a 13–2; by far the most rare top division winning score is a 11–4, having occurred only in 1972, 1996, 2017 and 2023. The wrestler who has won the most top division yūshō is Hakuhō with 45, followed by Taihō with 32, and Chiyonofuji with 31. Futabayama won 12 yūshō in an era when only two tournaments were held each year.

The first foreign wrestler to win the makuuchi division yūshō was the Hawaiian born Takamiyama Daigorō in June 1972. There were no others until Konishiki Yasokichi won his first championship in November 1989. However, due to the dominance of foreign wrestlers in recent years, led by the Mongolian yokozuna Asashōryū and Hakuhō, there were no Japanese-born winners between Tochiazuma Daisuke in January 2006 and Kotoshōgiku in January 2016. The past few years have also brought multiple other Japanese champions.

== Playoffs ==
- Any playoffs are indicated on individual wrestler articles' tournament records and elseplace, as one P for every additional bout fought by the wrestler fought on day 15. (Example given below.)

Since 1947 a playoff system (kettei-sen) has been in place to determine the winner of the yūshō if two or more wrestlers finish with an identical score tied for first place. Until then, the yūshō would go to whoever was the higher in rank, as it was presumed they had faced better quality opposition, but this caused controversy in 1928, when ōzeki Hitachiiwa was chosen over maegashira Misugiiso despite the fact that one of the formers wins had come by default. There was similar criticism when new maegashira Chiyonoyama was denied a championship in November 1945, despite winning all his matches.

The wrestlers who have taken part in the most top division playoffs are Takanohana II with ten (5–5) and Hakuhō with ten (6–4). Chiyonofuji has the highest percentage of victories, with a perfect 6–0 playoff record.

Playoffs with more than two wrestlers involved are fairly common in lower divisions, but have only happened a handful of times in the top division. In such cases lots are drawn to decide who fights first, the sole wrestler to remain undefeated, or to win two consecutive bouts in a three-way (tomoesen), will alone claim the yūshō. A playoff is the only occasion in which wrestlers from the same stable (heya) and relatives can meet in tournament competition.

Three-way playoffs have occurred nine times, first in March 1956 and most recently in July 2026, with Aonishiki winning the yūshō by defeating Atamifuji first, then Kirishima in succession. Furthermore, two cases of four-way playoffs occurred in June 1947 and March 1997 respectively, and a unique five-way playoff in November 1996. – The latter's participants achieving the following scores: Musashimaru 11–4–PPP, Takanonami 11–4–PP, Akebono 11–4–P, Wakanohana Masaru 11–4–P, Kaiō 11–4–P. – Musashimaru had to win thrice to secure the yūshō. Takanonami won once but lost the final bout. Everyone else lost their only bout. Nevertheless, all four losing wrestlers are equally considered to be runners-up. (Jun-yūshō)

== See also ==
- Glossary of sumo terms
- List of sumo tournament top division champions
- List of sumo tournament second division champions
- List of sumo tournament top division runners-up
- List of sumo record holders
