= Dewaminato Rikichi =

Japanese sumo wrestler

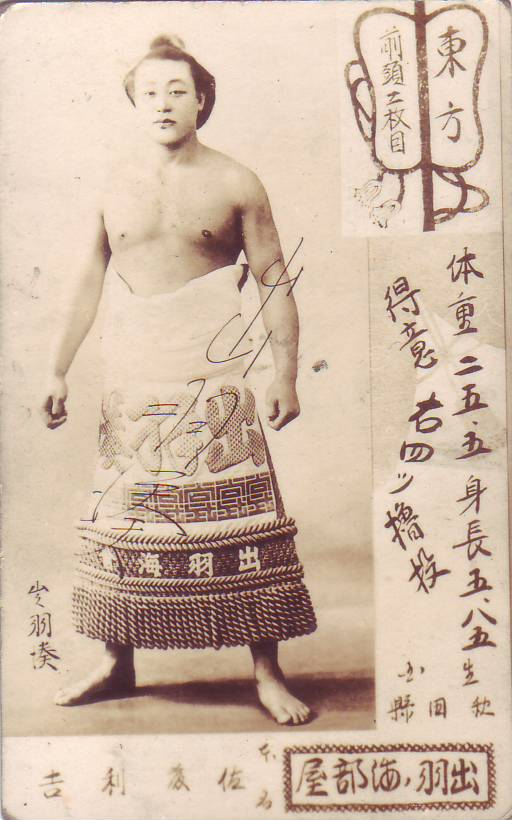

Personal information
- Native name: 出羽湊 利吉
- Born: Rikichi Satō; March 20, 1907 Akita prefecture, Japan
- Died: May 17, 1964 (aged 57)
- Height: 1.77 m (5 ft 9 1/2 in)
- Weight: 98 kg (216 lb)

Sport
- Sport: Sumo
- Retired: November, 1944
- Heya: Dewanoumi
- Record: 197-158-35-1draw
- Debut: March, 1928
- Highest rank: Sekiwake (January, 1937)
- Elder name: Hamakaze
- Championships: (1) (Makuuchi) (1) (Jūryō) (1) (Makushita)
- Gold Stars: 1 (Minanogawa)
- Updated on June 2020

Dewaminato Rikichi (born Rikichi Satō; March 20, 1907 – May 17, 1964) was a professional sumo wrestler with Dewanoumi stable.

He was born in Tsuchizaki-Minato, Akita Prefecture, Japan. He made his debut in 1928, reaching the top makuuchi division in 1935. His highest rank was sekiwake. In January 1939 he won the top division yūshō or championship with an undefeated 13–0 record, ending a run of five straight championships won by Futabayama. After his retirement in 1944 he worked as a coach at his stable until 1963, when he left the sumo world. He died a year later in 1964.

== Career ==
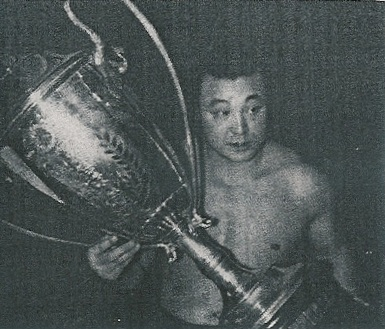
Dewaminato holding the Emperor's cup from his 1939 championship

He first entered the ring in the Summer 1928 tournament. In 1932, he was one of the few unsalaried wrestlers to be expelled from sumo by the Japan Sumo Association for being involved in a strike called the "Shunjuen Incident" that was largely unsuccessful. He, along with many others, was allowed back in from the Spring 1933 tournament. He was allowed into the makushita division, but unranked. His hiatus seemed to have recharged his sumo, as he posted eight winning tournaments over four years from this point. In this period, he also took the makushita championship in the Summer 1933 tournament, and after entering jūryō, in the following tournament, took the jūryō championship with a perfect 11–0 record in the Summer 1934 tournament.

He was promoted to the top makuuchi division for the Spring 1935 tournament. He managed to enter the titled ranks at sekiwake for the Spring 1937 tournament but only managed a 2–9 record and was demoted back to the untitled ranks of maegashira. In the Spring 1938 tournament, though he only had a 2–5 record before pulling out due to injury, he still managed a gold star or kinboshi win over yokozuna Minanogawa, incidentally one of the leaders of the strike back in 1933. He had another losing tournament that he had to withdraw from due to injury in Summer 1938. When he returned for the next tournament in the summer 1939 tournament at maegashira 17, he was on the cusp of relegation to the second division. He responded by posting a 13–0 record, including a victory over future yokozuna Haguroyama and winning the championship. Because he was a lower maegashira, he was not matched against yokozuna Futabayama, who in this same tournament had his record-setting winning streak broken at 69 by Dewaminato's stablemate Akinoumi. The impact of Dewaminato's perfect championship, called a zenshō-yūshō was overshadowed by the fact that Futabayama had achieved zenshō-yūshō in the five previous tournaments up to this point, and would bounce back to achieve yet another one in the following Summer tournament.

Dewaminato fought on after this, managing to stay in the upper maegashira ranks, and even managed to return to sekiwake for two consecutive tournaments in 1942–43. His fortunes began to decline after this however, and after losing all ten of his bouts in the Summer 1944 tournament, he retired before the start of the Autumn 1944 tournament.

== Retirement from sumo ==
He served as a sumo elder under the name Hamakaze Oyakata and worked as a coach at Dewanoumi stable. He left the Sumo Association in July 1963. He died in May 1964 at the age of 57.

== Fighting style ==
Dewaminato's most common winning techniques were hatakikomi (slap down), sotogake (outer leg trip) and sukuinage (scoop throw).

== Career record ==
Dewaminato Rikichi
-	Spring Haru basho, Tokyo	March Sangatsu basho, varied	Summer Natsu basho, Tokyo	October Jūgatsu basho, varied
1928	x	x	(Maezumo)	Jonokuchi –
1929	West Jonidan #40; 6–0	West Jonidan #40; 4–2	East Sandanme #29; 3–3	East Sandanme #29; 4–2
1930	East Sandanme #12; 4–2	East Sandanme #12; 3–3	West Makushita #29; 2–4	West Makushita #29; 5–1
1931	West Makushita #12; 1–5	West Makushita #12; 2–4	West Sandanme #2; 5–1	West Sandanme #2; 4–2
1932	Expelled	Expelled	Expelled	Expelled
Record given as wins–losses–absences Top division champion Top division runner-up Retired Lower divisions Non-participation Sanshō key: F=Fighting spirit; O=Outstanding performance; T=Technique Also shown: ★=Kinboshi; P=Playoff(s); Divisions: Makuuchi — Jūryō — Makushita — Sandanme — Jonidan — Jonokuchi Makuuchi ranks: Yokozuna — Ōzeki — Sekiwake — Komusubi — Maegashira

-	Spring Haru basho, Tokyo	Summer Natsu basho, Tokyo	Autumn Aki basho, Tokyo
1933	Makushita; 7–2	East Makushita #7; 8–3; Champion	Not held
1934	East Jūryō #10; 7–4	East Jūryō #3; 11–0; Champion	Not held
1935	West Maegashira #9; 6–5	West Maegashira #7; 6–5	Not held
1936	East Maegashira #5; 8–3	West Maegashira #1; 7–4	Not held
1937	East Sekiwake; 2–9	East Maegashira #3; 7–6	Not held
1938	East Maegashira #2; 2–5–6 ★	East Maegashira #9; 3–5–5	Not held
1939	West Maegashira #17; 13–0	West Komusubi; 5–10	Not held
1940	West Maegashira #8; 8–7	West Maegashira #2; 10–5	Not held
1941	East Komusubi; 0–2–13	East Maegashira #5; 9–6	Not held
1942	West Maegashira #1; 9–6	West Sekiwake; 8–6; 1d	Not held
1943	East Sekiwake; 3–12	West Maegashira #4; 7–8	Not held
1944	East Maegashira #4; 8–6–1	West Maegashira #2; 0–10	West Maegashira #15; Retired; 0–0–10
Record given as win-loss-absent Top Division Champion Top Division Runner-up Retired Lower Divisions Key: ★=Kinboshi(s); d=Draw(s) (引分); h=Hold(s) (預り); Divisions: Makuuchi — Jūryō — Makushita — Sandanme — Jonidan — Jonokuchi Makuuchi ranks: Yokozuna — Ōzeki — Sekiwake — Komusubi — Maegashira

== See also ==
- Glossary of sumo terms
- List of past sumo wrestlers
- List of sekiwake
- List of sumo tournament top division champions
- List of sumo tournament second division champions
