= Tenryū Saburō =

Japanese sumo wrestler (1903–1989)

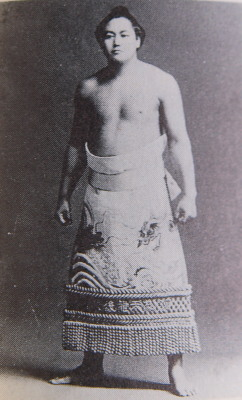

Personal information
- Native name: 天竜 三郎
- Born: Saburō Wakuta; November 1, 1903 Hamana District, Shizuoka Prefecture; Japan
- Died: August 20, 1989 (aged 85)
- Height: 1.87 m (6 ft 1 1/2 in)
- Weight: 116 kg (256 lb)

Sport
- Sport: Sumo
- Retired: January 1932
- Heya: Dewanoumi
- Record: 171–85–18–6 draws
- Debut: May 1920
- Highest rank: Sekiwake (May 1930)
- Championships: (1) (Jūryō) (1) (Sandanme)

Tenryū Saburō, (November 1, 1903 – August 20, 1989) born Saburō Wakuta in the Hamana District, Shizuoka Prefecture (now Hamamatsu) was a professional sumo wrestler of the Dewanoumi stable. His highest rank was sekiwake. He was the ringleader of the Shunjuen Incident, in which many wrestlers went on strike.

== History ==
Born the third son of a farmer, Tenryū was known as an intellectual. He was a student in the electrical department of Kawate Technical School when he decided to enroll in professional sumo. He was spotted by former yokozuna Hitachiyama and joined the Dewanoumi stable. He began his career in 1920, under the shikona, or ring name Mikatagahara (三方ヶ原), after a battle near his hometown. He entered the makuuchi division in May 1928 and was promoted to sekiwake in May 1930. He was a rival of Musashiyama and was popular because of his techniques and handsomeness.

=== The Shunjuen Incident ===
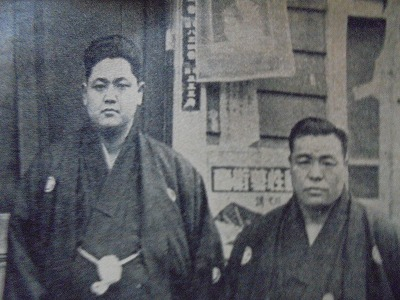
Tenryū (left) and Ōnosato Mansuke (right) after they cut off their ōichōmage

Tenryū became one of the leader of the Shunjuen Incident that broke out on January 6, 1932. One day after the January banzuke release, 32 Dewanoumi ichimon (clan) wrestlers gathered at a Chinese restaurant named Shunjuen, located in Tokyo's Oimachi district. They demanded full scale reforms from the Japan Sumo Association to improve the wrestlers living conditions. Subsequently, a number of sekitori from a non-Dewanoumi ichimon, including then sekiwake Minanogawa, joined the protest. The Association was faced with an unprecedented crisis never before seen in the history of professional sumo and responded quickly to the group's demands, but their responses were considered to be half-hearted and lacking in substance, and eventually, the negotiations collapsed.
Some theories attribute the launch of the strike due to Tenryū's bitterness from being passed over for ōzeki promotion in favor of his rival. Musashiyama was in fact promoted before Tenryū (from komusubi straight to ōzeki) in the January 1932 tournament while Tenryū remained sekiwake for six consecutive tournament despite having a winning record in each.
Just like his comrade Ōnosato Mansuke, Tenryū cut off his ōichōmage top knot and founded with the secessionists the Kansai Sumo Association (Kansai Kakuryoku Kyokai, 関西角力協会) in which he devoted himself as a director. Due to financial problems, the association was however dissolved at the end of 1937.

== Later life ==
Tenryū did not return to the Japan Sumo Association and worked for a time as secretary and assistant to a Cabinet Minister of then Japanese-occupied Manchuria. There, he established the Manchuria Sumo Association, and helped promote sumo by organizing tournaments and developing young rikishi. In 1939, he invited teachers of Japanese martial arts to Manchuria. He discovered the Aiki-Budo of Morihei Ueshiba and became his student the same day. In subsequent years, he became popular as a sumo commentator on TBS for his dry and acerbic style.

He was invited as an advisor by the Japan Sumo Association and was given a special certificate by the Yoshida family for his sumo-related work in Manchuria. In 1957, the reforms Tenryū had supported were implemented as a norm in professional sumo due to the National Diet implementing the reform. He died on August 20, 1989, at the age of 85.

== Career record ==
Tenryū Saburō
-	Spring	Summer
1920	(Maezumo)	East Jonokuchi #18; 0–0–5
1921	East Jonokuchi #11; 1–2–2	East Jonokuchi #9; 2–2; 1d
1922	East Jonidan #26; 4–1	West Sandanme #27; 1–3; 1d
1923	East Sandanme #40; 6–3; 1d	East Sandanme #18; 4–2
1924	East Sandanme #4; 4–0; 1d Championship	East Makushita #14; 4–2
1925	East Makushita #3; 3–3	West Makushita #5; 2–3; 1d
1926	West Makushita #9; 4–2	West Makushita #5; 2–4
Record given as wins–losses–absences Top division champion Top division runner-up Retired Lower divisions Non-participation Sanshō key: F=Fighting spirit; O=Outstanding performance; T=Technique Also shown: ★=Kinboshi; P=Playoff(s); Divisions: Makuuchi — Jūryō — Makushita — Sandanme — Jonidan — Jonokuchi Makuuchi ranks: Yokozuna — Ōzeki — Sekiwake — Komusubi — Maegashira

-	Spring Haru basho, Tokyo	March Sangatsu basho, varied	Summer Natsu basho, Tokyo	October Jūgatsu basho, varied
1927	East Makushita #19; 5–1	East Makushita #19; 5–1	East Jūryō #10; 3–3	West Jūryō #10; 6–5
1928	East Jūryō #10; 10–1; Championship	East Jūryō #2; 7–4	West Maegashira #13; 9–2	West Maegashira #13; 8–3
1929	East Maegashira #2; 0–0–11	East Maegashira #2; 6–5	East Maegashira #6; 8–3	East Maegashira #6; 6–5
1930	East Maegashira #1; 7–4	East Maegashira #1; 10–1	East Sekiwake; 6–4	East Sekiwake; 8–3
1931	West Sekiwake; 8–3	West Sekiwake; 8–3	East Sekiwake; 6–5	East Sekiwake; 8–3
1932	West Sekiwake #1; Retired; 0–0	x	x	x
Record given as win-loss-absent Top Division Champion Top Division Runner-up Retired Lower Divisions Key:d=Draw(s) (引分); h=Hold(s) (預り); Divisions: Makuuchi — Jūryō — Makushita — Sandanme — Jonidan — Jonokuchi Makuuchi ranks: Yokozuna — Ōzeki — Sekiwake — Komusubi — Maegashira

== See also ==
- Glossary of sumo terms
- List of past sumo wrestlers
- List of sekiwake
