= Toyokuni Fukuma =

Japanese sumo wrestler

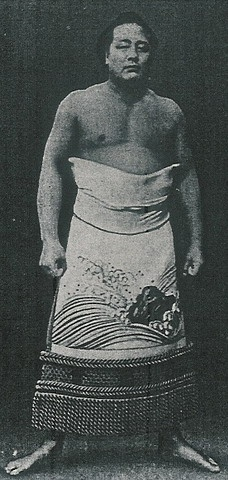
- Toyokuni, circa 1928

Personal information
- Native name: 豊國 福馬
- Born: Takahashi Fukuma; August 9, 1893 Oita prefecture
- Died: May 25, 1942 (aged 48)
- Height: 1.81 m (5 ft 11 1/2 in)
- Weight: 117 kg (258 lb)

Sport
- Sport: Sumo
- Retired: October, 1930
- Heya: Izutsu
- Record: 208-101-36-2d-3a
- Debut: January, 1915
- Highest rank: Ōzeki (October, 1927)
- Elder name: Kokonoe
- Championships: 2 (Makuuchi); 1 (Jonidan)
- Updated on June 2020

Toyokuni Fukuma (Japanese: 豊國 福馬; August 9, 1893 – May 25, 1942) was a Japanese professional sumo wrestler from Oita City. He made his debut in 1915. He won two top division tournament championships. His highest rank was ōzeki. He retired in 1930 and became a sumo coach.

== Early life ==
Born Fukuma Takahashi (高橋 福馬), he had a very large build from a young age. When he was registered for military service at age twenty he measured in at 181 centimeters tall and weighed 80 kilograms. When he joined the Kokura artillery battery, his size was noticed by his commanding officer and he was released from service to enter professional sumo.

== Career ==
The expectations placed on Takahashi when he debuted in sumo are clear from his initial shikona or ring name of Kuganishiki Fukuma (陸錦 福馬) that he was given. It combined one of the characters from the name of recently retired Hitachiyama with one of the characters from the former ring name of the then current yokozuna Nishinoumi Kajirō II, which had been Nishikinada (錦洋). From his entry into sumo in January 1915, he lived up to these expectations and rose steadily through the ranks. In his fourth tournament in January 1917, at jonidan 12 he earned his first championship with a 5–0 record. After four more years of tournaments with straight winning records he reached the top-tier makuuchi division in the May 1921 tournament. On this occasion he would take the new ring name of Onogawa Kiichiro (小野川 喜一郎). In this tournament his record was 4–5 with one draw. This was his first losing tournament in over six years of sumo. He was demoted to jūryō 1 for the following January 1922 tournament. A 5–3 record was enough to put him back into makuuchi for the next tournament, where he would remain for the rest of his career. His success continued and he rose steadily through the ranks of maegashira and a very strong showing of 9–2 at the rank of komusubi in May 1926 would see him promoted to sekiwake. All three of his sekiwake appearances were winning records and in his second and third tournaments at sekiwake he came in second to yokozuna Tsunenohana for the championship. He was promoted to ōzeki for the following October 1927 tournament. In his rise to ōzeki after his initial losing tournament in his makuuchi debut in May 1921, he had only recorded one more losing record in a span of over six years. Ironically, he would miss his entire first tournament at ōzeki due to a bout of influenza. Two tournaments after becoming an ōzeki he changed his name to Toyokuni Fukuma because a sumo elder in Osaka sumo had the name Onogawa. As an ōzeki, Toyokuni's winning streak continued, and in the January 1929 tournament he would come one win short of the championship, losing it to then sekiwake Tamanishiki. The following March tournament, Toyokuni attained his first makuuchi championship. Two tournaments later, in September of the same year he was again the runner up for the championship. The following tournament in January 1930 he attained his second and final makuuchi championship. The following tournament in March of that year, he would finally record his first losing tournament in the san'yaku ranks. He bounced back in the following May tournament with an 8–3 record, but in the subsequent October tournament he withdrew due to a back injury after achieving only a 1–3 record. Afterwards, he soon announced his retirement.

== Post wrestler life ==
Upon retiring, Toyokuni would take the elder name Kokonoe (九重) and soon after became the head of Kokonoe stable, a previous incarnation of the current Kokonoe stable. Later on his health began to suffer and in May 1937 he was obliged to disband the stable and his wrestlers moved to Asahiyama stable. He died in May 1942 at the age of 48.

== Career record ==
- In 1927 Tokyo and Osaka sumo merged and four tournaments a year in Tokyo and other locations began to be held.

Toyokuni Fukuma
-	Spring Haru basho, varied	Summer Natsu basho, varied
1915	(Maezumo)	West Jonokuchi #19; 0–0–5
1916	East Jonokuchi #7; 4–1	West Jonidan #56; 4–1
1917	West Jonidan #12; 5–0; Champion	West Sandanme #39; 5–0
1918	West Makushita #47; 4–1	East Makushita #19; 3–1; 1h
1919	East Jūryō #15; 2–2; 1h	East Makushita #1; 4–1
1920	West Jūryō #8; 3–1; 1d	East Jūryō #7; 4–1
1921	West Jūryō #2; 3–2	East Maegashira #15; 4–5; 1d
1922	West Jūryō #1; 5–3	East Maegashira #16; 7–3
1923	West Maegashira #5; 7–3	East Maegashira #2; 0–0–11
1924	East Maegashira #7; 6–4	West Maegashira #2; 3–8
1925	West Maegashira #5; 6–5	East Maegashira #2; 5–3–2; 1h
1926	East Maegashira #1; 8–3	West Komusubi #1; 9–2
Record given as wins–losses–absences Top division champion Top division runner-up Retired Lower divisions Non-participation Sanshō key: F=Fighting spirit; O=Outstanding performance; T=Technique Also shown: ★=Kinboshi; P=Playoff(s); Divisions: Makuuchi — Jūryō — Makushita — Sandanme — Jonidan — Jonokuchi Makuuchi ranks: Yokozuna — Ōzeki — Sekiwake — Komusubi — Maegashira

-	Spring Haru basho, Tokyo	March Sangatsu basho, varied	Summer Natsu basho, Tokyo	October Jūgatsu basho, varied
1927	East Sekiwake #1; 7–4	East Sekiwake #1; 9–2	East Sekiwake #2; 9–2	West Ōzeki #2; 0–0–11
1928	West Ōzeki #1; 6–5	East Ōzeki #2; 7–4	East Ōzeki #1; 7–4	East Ōzeki #1; 7–4
1929	West Ōzeki #1; 9–2	West Ōzeki #1; 9–2	West Ōzeki #1; 6–5	West Ōzeki #1; 8–3
1930	West Ōzeki #1; 9–2	West Ōzeki #1; 5–6	West Ōzeki #1; 8–3	West Ōzeki #1; Retired; 1–3–7
Record given as win-loss-absent Top Division Champion Top Division Runner-up Retired Lower Divisions Key:d=Draw(s) (引分); h=Hold(s) (預り); Divisions: Makuuchi — Jūryō — Makushita — Sandanme — Jonidan — Jonokuchi Makuuchi ranks: Yokozuna — Ōzeki — Sekiwake — Komusubi — Maegashira

== See also ==
- Glossary of sumo terms
- List of sumo tournament top division champions
- List of past sumo wrestlers
- List of ōzeki
