= Kagamiiwa Zenshirō =

Japanese sumo wrestler

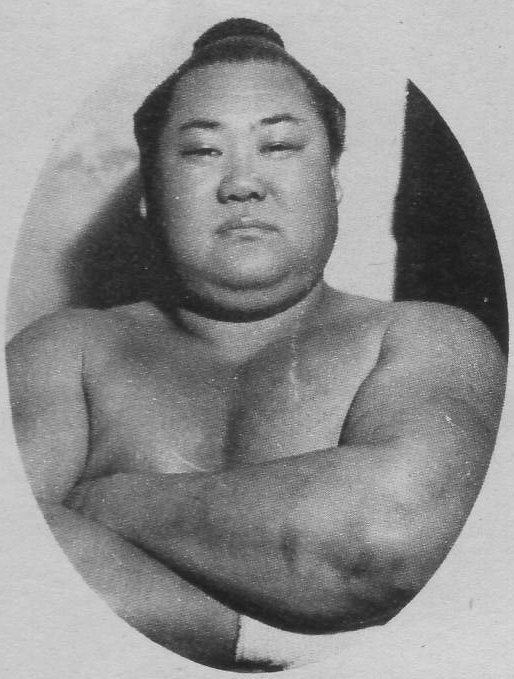

Personal information
- Native name: 鏡岩 善四郎
- Born: Sasaki Zenshirō; 4 May 1902 Aomori, Japan
- Died: 5 August 1950 (aged 48)
- Height: 1.73 m (5 ft 8 in)
- Weight: 113 kg (249 lb)

Sport
- Sport: Sumo
- Retired: May 1939
- Heya: Kumegawa
- Record: 239-183-4-1a
- Debut: January 1921
- Highest rank: Ōzeki (January 1937)
- Elder name: Kumegawa
- Championships: 1 (Makushita); 1 (Jonokuchi)
- Gold Stars: 1 Miyagiyama
- Updated on June 2020

Kagamiiwa Zenshirō (born Zenshirō Sasaki, 4 May 1902 – 5 August 1950) was a sumo wrestler from Aomori Prefecture, Japan. His highest rank was ōzeki.

== Career ==
Making his debut in 1921, he inherited the shikona, or ring name of the founder of his stable and 19th century ōzeki, Kagamiiwa Hamanosuke. He won his first championship in the jonokuchi division in May 1922. He achieved 6 straight winning records and was promoted to makushita in 1925. He then won the makushita championship in May 1927 and was promoted to makuuchi in 1928. He secured his first kinboshi or gold star in January 1930 with a win over Miyagiyama, the first tournament in which the system was introduced. During the January 1931 tournament, he was runner up for the championship. He did not wrestle in 1932, but returned in 1933 and reached his highest rank of komusubi in May 1934. He was runner up for the championship a second time in January 1935 and reached the rank of sekiwake in January 1936. In January 1937, he was promoted to his final rank of ōzeki, simultaneously with Futabayama. At the age of 34 he was the oldest ever to be promoted to ōzeki. In January 1939 he had a bout with Banjaku that went on so long a rest break (mizu-iri) was called. Kagamiiwa chose to forfeit the re-match and so was given a loss by default (fusenpai) but his opponent sportingly refused to accept a default win, so both wrestlers were marked with a loss.

== Retirement from sumo ==
He retired in May 1939. He had become head coach of Kumegawa stable while still active. He recruited and trained yokozuna Kagamisato. In 1941 when Futabayama started his own stable, Kagamiiwa wound up his Kumegawa stable and merged it with Futabayama's (it became Tokitsukaze stable in 1945). He continued to work as a coach there until his death in 1950 at the age of 48.

== Career record ==
- In 1927 Tokyo and Osaka sumo merged and four tournaments a year in Tokyo and other locations began to be held.

Kagamiiwa Zenshiro
-	Spring Haru basho, varied	Summer Natsu basho, varied
1921	(Maezumo)	(Maezumo)
1922	(Maezumo)	East Jonokuchi #18; 5–0; Champion
1923	East Jonidan #12; 6–4	West Sandanme #46; 3–3
1924	West Sandanme #40; 4–0; 1h	West Sandanme #4; 5–1
1925	East Makushita #20; 4–2	East Makushita #8; 3–3
1926	West Makushita #10; 5–1	East Makushita #2; 3–3
Record given as wins–losses–absences Top division champion Top division runner-up Retired Lower divisions Non-participation Sanshō key: F=Fighting spirit; O=Outstanding performance; T=Technique Also shown: ★=Kinboshi; P=Playoff(s); Divisions: Makuuchi — Jūryō — Makushita — Sandanme — Jonidan — Jonokuchi Makuuchi ranks: Yokozuna — Ōzeki — Sekiwake — Komusubi — Maegashira

-	Spring Haru basho, Tokyo	March Sangatsu basho, varied	Summer Natsu basho, Tokyo	October Jūgatsu basho, varied
1927	East Makushita #5; 3–3	East Makushita #5; 4–2	East Makushita #7; 5–1	West Jūryō #9; 9–2
1928	East Jūryō #5; 6–5	West Maegashira #14; 8–3	West; 6–5	West; 8–3
1929	East Maegashira #9; 8–3	East Maegashira #9; 6–5	East Maegashira #5; 5–6	East Maegashira #5; 5–4–2
1930	East Maegashira #6; 6–5 ★	East Maegashira #6; 5–6	West Maegashira #4; 1–10	West Maegashira #4; 2–9
1931	East Maegashira #14; 9–2	East Maegashira #14; 9–2	West Maegashira #4; 8–3	West Maegashira #4; 4–7
1932	East Maegashira #2 – Left the JSA	Left the JSA	Left the JSA	Left the JSA
Record given as wins–losses–absences Top division champion Top division runner-up Retired Lower divisions Non-participation Sanshō key: F=Fighting spirit; O=Outstanding performance; T=Technique Also shown: ★=Kinboshi; P=Playoff(s); Divisions: Makuuchi — Jūryō — Makushita — Sandanme — Jonidan — Jonokuchi Makuuchi ranks: Yokozuna — Ōzeki — Sekiwake — Komusubi — Maegashira

-	Spring Haru basho, Tokyo	Summer Natsu basho, Tokyo	Autumn Aki basho, Tokyo
1933	Maegashira; 1–8–2	East Maegashira #11; 6–5	Not held
1934	East Maegashira #7; 7–4	West Komusubi; 0–11	Not held
1935	East Maegashira #8; 10–1	West Maegashira #1; 7–4	Not held
1936	West Sekiwake; 8–3	East Sekiwake; 9–2	Not held
1937	West Ōzeki #2; 6–5	West Ōzeki #2; 9–4	Not held
1938	West Ōzeki #1; 5–8	West Ōzeki #1; 7–6	Not held
1939	West Ōzeki #1; 5–8	West Ōzeki #1; Retired; 4–11	x
Record given as wins–losses–absences Top division champion Top division runner-up Retired Lower divisions Non-participation Sanshō key: F=Fighting spirit; O=Outstanding performance; T=Technique Also shown: ★=Kinboshi; P=Playoff(s); Divisions: Makuuchi — Jūryō — Makushita — Sandanme — Jonidan — Jonokuchi Makuuchi ranks: Yokozuna — Ōzeki — Sekiwake — Komusubi — Maegashira

== See also ==
- Glossary of sumo terms
- List of sumo tournament top division champions
- List of past sumo wrestlers
- List of ōzeki
