= Ōnosato Mansuke =

Japanese sumo wrestler (1892–1938)

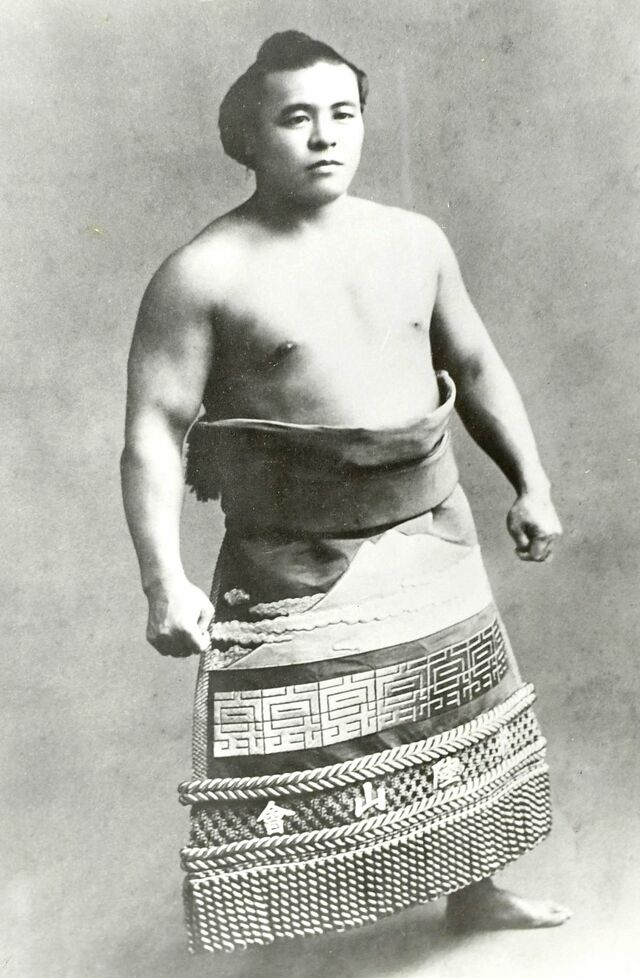

Personal information
- Native name: 大ノ里 萬助
- Born: Mansuke Tennai; April 1, 1892 Fujisaki, Aomori Prefecture, Empire of Japan
- Died: January 22, 1938 (aged 45) Dairen, Manchukuo
- Height: 1.64 m (5 ft 4 1/2 in)
- Weight: 97 kg (214 lb; 15.3 st)

Sport
- Sport: Sumo
- Retired: January 1932
- Heya: Dewanoumi
- Record: 262-160-22-8d-4h
- Debut: January 1912
- Highest rank: Ōzeki (January 1925)
- Gold Stars: 2 (Ōtori, Nishinoumi III)
- Updated on March 6, 2023

Ōnosato Mansuke (Japanese: 大ノ里 萬助; born Mansuke Tennai (天内 萬助), April 1, 1892 - January 22, 1938) was a Japanese professional sumo wrestler from the Minamitsugaru District (now Fujisaki) in the Aomori Prefecture. Nicknamed Sumō no kami-sama (相撲の神様; Sumo god),, he was one of the leaders of the Shunjuen Incident.

== History ==
Born on April 1, 1892, in Aomori Prefecture. He decided to join professional sumo in 1910 after a touring team came to Fujisaki in the summer. Even though he had a small stature, his enthusiasm earned him admission in the Dewanoumi stable, and he stepped in the ring for the first time in 1912.

When he entered the professional world, he was one of the smallest wrestlers listed on the banzuke, earning him the early nickname of Nezumi (ネズミ; lit. 'the mouse'). Ōnosato rose through the ranks through hard work and diligence. However, as might be expected, he was unable to achieve good results at the higher ranks at first due to the weaknesses of his small stature. Ōnosato was however promoted komusubi and sekiwake in the 1922 tournaments, becoming the smallest san'yaku-ranked wrestler of the Shōwa era.

He earned a promotion to the rank of ōzeki in the May 1925 tournament. At the time, he was the fourth ōzeki from Aomori Prefecture and the first promoted at this rank in 55 years, after Ichinoya's promotion in 1889. He held the rank for 7 straight years. Ōnosato earned the nickname 'Sumo god' because of his warm personality and his enthusiastic guidance of young wrestlers, and he became popular with many rikishi.

=== The Shunjuen Incident ===
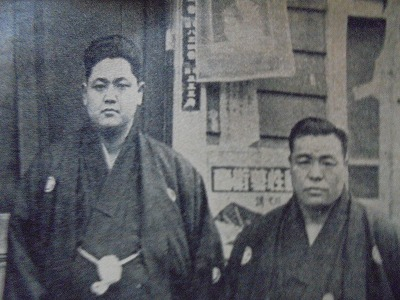
Tenryū Saburō (left) and Ōnosato after they cut off their ōichōmage

Ōnosato became one of the leaders of the Shunjuen Incident that broke out on January 6, 1932. One day after the January banzuke release, 32 Dewanoumi ichimon (clan) wrestlers gathered at a Chinese restaurant named Shunjuen, located in Tokyo's Oimachi district. They demanded full scale reforms from the Japan Sumo Association to improve the wrestlers living conditions. Subsequently, a number of sekitori from a non-Dewanoumi ichimon, including then sekiwake Minanogawa, joined the protest . The Association was faced with an unprecedented crisis never before seen in the history of professional sumo and responded quickly to the group's demands, but their responses were considered to be half-hearted and lacking in substance, and eventually, the negotiations collapsed.
Just like his comrade Tenryū Saburō, Ōnosato cut off his ōichōmage top knot, and founded with the secessionists the Kansai Sumo Association (関西角力協会, Kansai Kakuryoku Kyokai) where he wrestled until 1935. He then served as chairman of this association but his declining health precipitated the fall of the organization and the wrestlers came back to Tokyo.

== Fighting style ==
Ōnosato was known for his short stature and had to compensate for this weak point with his technique. He was particularly known for his tachi-ai and use of the roundness of the ring. His small stature did not prevent him from easily winning matches against much larger opponents, such as Dewagatake, the first recorded wrestler with a height of 2 meters.

== Death and homage ==
Ōnosato, among the wrestlers of the Kansai Sumo Association, took part in a tournament in Manchukuo in 1933. The tournament was to be held to put his association back on track after several successive failures and the desertion of several wrestlers who returned to the Sumo Association in Tokyo. He fell ill and was admitted to a Red Cross hospital in Dalian. He died of pleurisy in January 1938, at the age of 45, after a long illness. The day after the news of Onosato's death, the Dewanoumi ichimon received a final letter from Ōnosato in which he expressed his concern and encouragement for his Kansai disciples who had returned to the stable.

Ōnosato is credited with starting the trend among wrestlers from Aomori Prefecture to include the kanji for 'village' (里) in their shikona (such as Kagamisato, Aonosato, and Takanosato).

On August 1, 1960, a monument was unveiled in the precincts of Kashima Shrine in his hometown of Fujisaki and a competition for elementary school students of the Aomori Prefecture, called the "Ōnosato Cup Youth Sumo Tournament", is held every year in August in that shrine.

The name Ōnosato was also used by Entremet Sato, a company based in his hometown, as the name of a candy.

On February 4, 2023, several of his belongings were donated to his hometown of Fujisaki. The objects were in possession of the family of Ōnosato's former patron. Among the dozen of valuable materials, photographs, his akeni (sumo luggage) and a keshō-mawashi were donated.

In April 2023, his shikona, or ring name, was given to Nishonoseki stable wrestler and amateur tournament star Daiki Nakamura. Although the shikona doesn't feature exactly the same kana, it has been noted that before giving Nakamura his ring name, his master (former yokozuna Kisenosato) consulted a former stablemate, Wakanosato, so that the latter requested permission from Ōnosato Mansuke's family who still reside in Aomori Prefecture.

== Top Division Record ==
Ōnosato Mansuke
-	Spring	Summer
1913	East Jonokuchi #20; 4–1	East Jonidan #60; 4–1
1914	East Sandanme #69; 4–1	East Sandanme #28; 4–1
1915	West Makushita #55; 3–1; 1d	West Makushita #45; 4–0; 1d
1916	East Makushita #16; 4–1	East Jūryō #14; 5–0
1917	East Jūryō #4; 4–3	East Jūryō #2; 3–3
1918	East Jūryō #4; 6–1	East Maegashira #15; 4–5; 1d
1919	East Maegashira #14; 8–1; 1h	East Maegashira #5; 5–4–1
1920	East Maegashira #4; 7–2; 1d ★	West Maegashira #1; 2–8
1921	West Maegashira #6; 2–6; 2h	East Maegashira #9; 7–2–1
1922	East Komusubi #1; 6–3; 1d	West Sekiwake #1; 5–3; 2d
1923	East Sekiwake #1; 4–6	West Maegashira #1; 6–4; 1h ★
1924	West Sekiwake #1; 7–2; 1d	East Sekiwake #1; 9–2
1925	Sat out	West Ōzeki #1; 4–3–4
1926	West Ōzeki #1; 7–4	East Ōzeki #1; 8–3
Record given as win-loss-absent Top Division Champion Top Division Runner-up Retired Lower Divisions Key: ★=Kinboshi(s); d=Draw(s) (引分); h=Hold(s) (預り); Divisions: Makuuchi — Jūryō — Makushita — Sandanme — Jonidan — Jonokuchi Makuuchi ranks: Yokozuna — Ōzeki — Sekiwake — Komusubi — Maegashira

-	Spring Haru basho, Tokyo	March Sangatsu basho, varied	Summer Natsu basho, Tokyo	October Jūgatsu basho, varied
1927	West Ōzeki #1; 6–5	West Ōzeki #1; 9–2	West Haridashi Ōzeki; 2–6–5	East Ōzeki #1; 8–3
1928	East Haridashi Ōzeki; 3–3–5	West Haridashi Ōzeki; 8–3	West Haridashi Ōzeki; 6–5	West Haridashi Ōzeki; 6–5
1929	East Haridashi Ōzeki; 6–5	East Haridashi Ōzeki; 6–5	East Haridashi Ōzeki; 6–5	East Haridashi Ōzeki; 7–4
1930	East Ōzeki #1; 6–5	East Ōzeki #1; 7–4	East Ōzeki #1; 9–2	East Ōzeki #1; 6–5
1931	West Ōzeki #1; 6–5	West Ōzeki #1; 7–4	East Ōzeki #1; 4–7	East Ōzeki #1; 4–7
1932	West Ōzeki #2; Retired; 0–0	x	x	x
Record given as win-loss-absent Top Division Champion Top Division Runner-up Retired Lower Divisions Key: ★=Kinboshi(s); d=Draw(s) (引分); h=Hold(s) (預り); Divisions: Makuuchi — Jūryō — Makushita — Sandanme — Jonidan — Jonokuchi Makuuchi ranks: Yokozuna — Ōzeki — Sekiwake — Komusubi — Maegashira

== See also ==
- Glossary of sumo terms
- List of past sumo wrestlers
- List of ōzeki
