= Noshirogata Kinsaku =

Japanese sumo wrestler

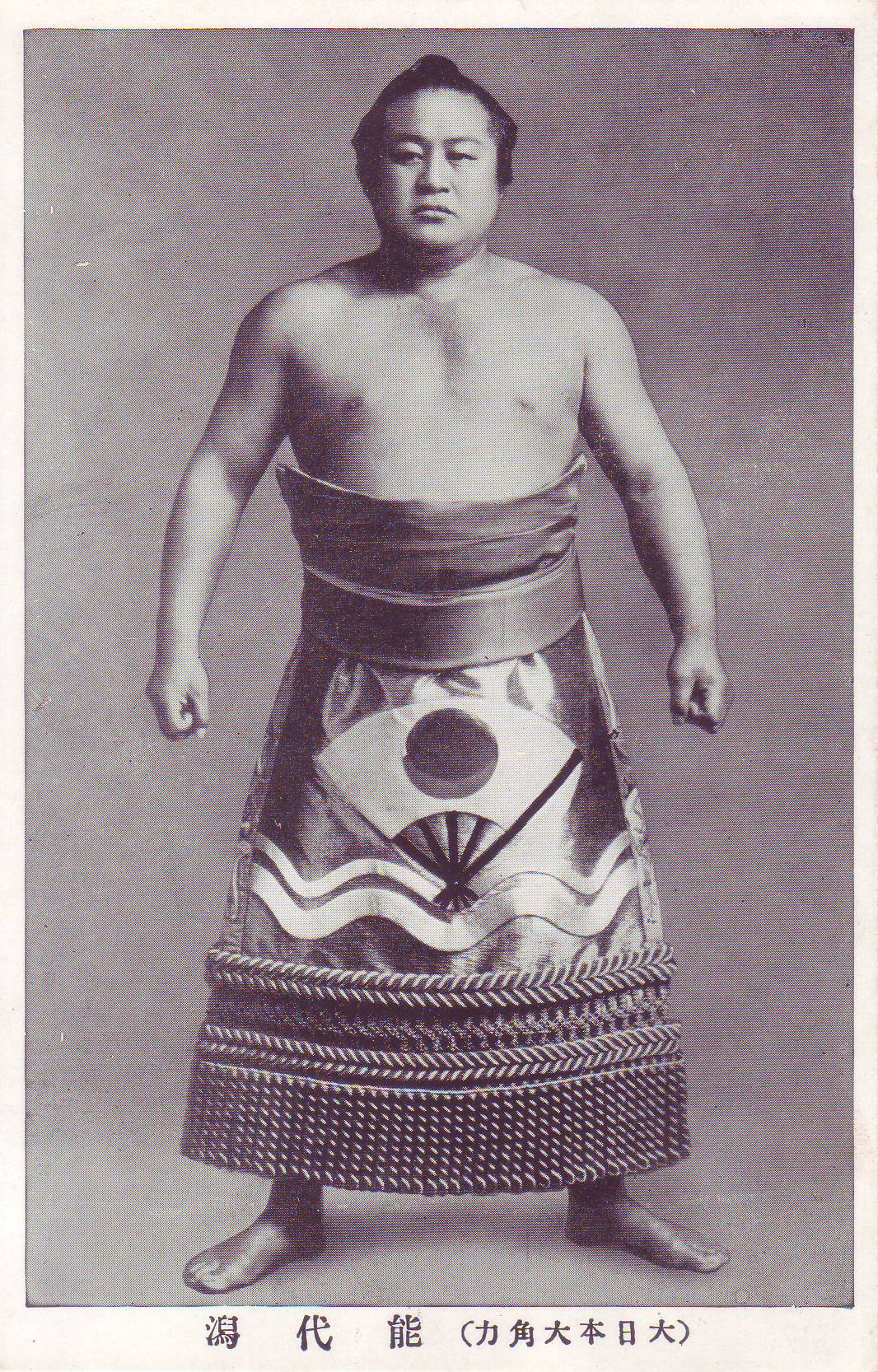

Personal information
- Native name: 能代潟 錦作
- Born: Iwamatsu Ishida; May 4, 1895 Yamamoto, Akita Prefecture; Japan
- Died: June 8, 1973 (aged 78)
- Height: 1.70 m (5 ft 7 in)
- Weight: 124 kg (273 lb; 19.5 st)

Sport
- Sport: Sumo
- Retired: May 1936
- Heya: Nishikijima
- Debut: January 1915
- Highest rank: Ōzeki (January 1927)
- Elder name: Tatsutayama
- Championships: 1 (Makuuchi); 1 (Jūryō)
- Gold Stars: 1 (Tamanishiki)
- Updated on April 12, 2023

Noshirogata Kinsaku (Japanese: 能代潟 錦作; born Iwamatsu Ishida (石田 岩松), April 5, 1895 – June 8, 1973) was a Japanese professional sumo wrestler from Yamamoto (now Mitane), Akita Prefecture. Known as a tenacious wrestler, he reached the makuuchi division in May 1921 and is the first wrestler from Akita Prefecture to have reached the rank of ōzeki before Terukuni in 1942 and Kiyokuni in 1969. He retired in May, 1936 and died in June, 1973.

== History ==
Born on May 5, 1895, in the Fujisato district of Yamamoto, in the Akita Prefecture, Noshirogata was the second son of a family of farmers. Known as a strong child, he participated in amateur tournaments as a country ōzeki. During the 1914 summer, he met a touring group of professional wrestlers and was convinced to become a rikishi. He began his career under the shikona, or ring name, Tsukiyama (突山), which is a reference to a mountain range in his hometown.

Noshirogata later inherited the old shikona of his master at Nishikijima stable (former sekiwake Orochigata). He made his sekitori debut in 1919 and was promoted to the Makuuchi division in May 1921, but had to sit out the tournament and was consequently demoted to the rank of jūryō for the year 1922. Noshirogata however won the jūryō championship in January 1922, securing a makuuchi comeback for the tournament of May of the same year. As a makuuchi wrestler he won a tournament in March 1928 and ended second place in two others.

When the Shunjuen Incident broke out in January 1932, Noshirogata was solicited by the group of strikers ("Great Japan Emerging Rikishi Group"), but he refused to join them. In the January 1933 tournament, he was demoted from the rank of ōzeki strait to komusubi. This was the last known situation where an ōzeki fell directly to the rank of komusubi and the last time an ōzeki who won a tournament fell below the rank of sekiwake. One of his last feats was to win a kinboshi against Yokozuna Tamanishiki during the May 1933 tournament. However, as a 41 years-old veteran wrestler, he began to suffer from neuralgia and asthma, an illness that already forced him to withdraw temporarily from the March 1929 tournament. Noshirogata chose to retire from active competition after two complete absences in the January and May 1936 tournaments.

After retiring, he assumed the elder name Tatsutayama (立田山), and established his own stable. As a stablemaster, he raised Komusubi Matsuragata. However, following an air raid on March 9, 1945, Matsuragata died and the stable closed, its staff being transferred back to Nishikijima stable. Noshirogata was a close friend of Yokozuna Futabayama, and helped trained him. When Futabayama retired and established his Sumo Dojo, Noshirogata became an affiliate and helped coaching Futabayama's wrestlers.

When the Japan Sumo Association introduced a mandatory retirement age in 1961, he retired and died on June 8, 1973, at the age of 78.

As a sports figure, his keshō-mawashi and photographs are exhibited at the History and Folklore Museum in Fujisato, Akita. In May 1989, his family donated a silver cup Noshirogata won in a "prizematch" sumo tournament in 1926.

== Top Division Record ==
Noshirogata
Year	January Hatsu basho, Tokyo	March Haru basho, Osaka	May Natsu basho, Tokyo	July Nagoya basho, Nagoya	September Aki basho, Tokyo	November Kyūshū basho, Fukuoka
1919	Unknown	Not held	East Jūryō #9; 4–1	Not held	Not held	Not held
1920	West Jūryō #1; 5–4	Not held	East Jūryō #1; 5–5	Not held	Not held	Not held
1921	West Jūryō #3; 5–2	Not held	West Maegashira #15; 0–0–10	Not held	Not held	Not held
1922	West Jūryō #4; 7–1; Champion	Not held	East Maegashira #14; 5–5	Not held	Not held	Not held
1923	West Maegashira #11; 7–2; 1d	Not held	East Maegashira #4; 7–1–1; 2d	Not held	Not held	Not held
1924	East Maegashira #1; 2–7; 1d	Not held	West Maegashira #6; 8–2; 1d	Not held	Not held	Not held
1925	West Sekiwake #1; 6–3; 1d-1h	Not held	Sekiwake #2; 8–2; 1d	Not held	Not held	Not held
1926	East Sekiwake #1; 8–3	Not held	West Sekiwake #1; 8–3	Not held	Not held	Not held
1927	East Ōzeki #1; 8–3	East Ōzeki #1; 4–1–6	East Ōzeki #1; 3–8	Not held	Not held	East Ōzeki #1; 10–1
1928	West Haridashi Ōzeki; 3–8	East Ōzeki #1; 10–0; 1d	East Haridashi Ōzeki; 4–7	Not held	Not held	East Haridashi Ōzeki; 9–2
1929	West Haridashi Ōzeki; 7–4	West Haridashi Ōzeki; 4–3–4	West Haridashi Ōzeki; 8–3	Not held	East Haridashi Ōzeki; 4–7	Not held
1930	West Haridashi Ōzeki; 5–6	West Haridashi Ōzeki; 4–7	West Sekiwake #1; 8–3	Not held	West Sekiwake #1; 8–3	Not held
1931	East Haridashi Ōzeki; 6–5	East Haridashi Ōzeki; 4–7	East Haridashi Ōzeki; 6–5	Not held	East Haridashi Ōzeki; 6–5	Not held
1932	Tournament Cancelled; 0–0–15	East Haridashi Ōzeki; 3–5	East Haridashi Ōzeki; 5–5	East Haridashi Ōzeki; 3–7; 1d	East Haridashi Ōzeki; 6–5	Not held
1933	East Komusubi #1; 5–6	Not held	West Maegashira #1; 6–5 ★	Not held	Not held	Not held
1934	East Komusubi #1; 7–4	Not held	East Sekiwake #1; 5–6	Not held	Not held	Not held
1935	East Maegashira #1; 4–7	Not held	East Maegashira #5; 8–3	Not held	Not held	Not held
1936	West Haridashi Komusubi; 0–0–11	Not held	East Maegashira #7; Retired; 0–0–11	x	x	x
Record given as win-loss-absent Top Division Champion Top Division Runner-up Retired Lower Divisions Key: ★=Kinboshi(s); d=Draw(s) (引分); h=Hold(s) (預り); Divisions: Makuuchi — Jūryō — Makushita — Sandanme — Jonidan — Jonokuchi Makuuchi ranks: Yokozuna — Ōzeki — Sekiwake — Komusubi — Maegashira

== See also ==
- Glossary of sumo terms
- List of past sumo wrestlers
- List of ōzeki
