= Ryōgoku Kajinosuke II =

Japanese sumo wrestler (1892–1960)

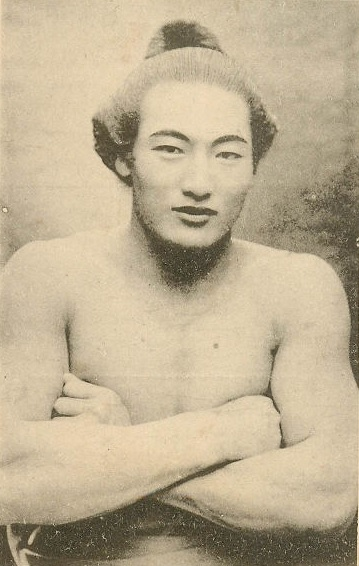

Personal information
- Native name: 両國 勇治郎
- Born: Yujiro Nishimura; March 18, 1892 Daisen, Akita, Japan
- Died: August 10, 1960 (aged 68)
- Height: 1.73 m (5 ft 8 in)
- Weight: 90 kg (200 lb)

Sport
- Sport: Sumo
- Retired: January 1924
- Heya: Dewanoumi
- Record: 92-72-34-2draws-1hold (makuuchi)
- Debut: June 1909
- Highest rank: Sekiwake (June 1915)
- Elder name: Takekuma
- Championships: 1 (Makuuchi)
- Updated on June 2020

Ryōgoku Kajinosuke II (両國 勇治郎, March 18, 1892 – August 10, 1960) was a Japanese sumo wrestler. His highest rank was sekiwake.

== Career ==
He made a debut in June 1909. He reached the top makuuchi division in May 1914 and won the championship with a 9-0-1 record. Until Takerufuji in March 2024, he was the only wrestler since the creation of the official championship system in 1909 to win the top division championship at his first attempt. After the win, he changed his shikona from Ryōgoku Yūjirō to Ryōgoku Kajinosuke. He reached sekiwake rank in January 1915 but was unable to climb any higher and spent most of the rest of his career as a maegashira. He retired in January 1924. After retirement, he worked under the name Takekuma in the Dewanoumi ichimon, and recruited Musashiyama. However, he later left the Dewanoumi ichimon and established Takekuma stable.

== Top division record ==
Ryōgoku
-	Spring	Summer
1914	x	East Maegashira #14; 9–0–1
1915	East Maegashira #3; 7–2–1; 1d	East Sekiwake; 4–5–1
1916	East Maegashira #2; 8–2	East Maegashira #1; 5–4; 1h
1917	West Komusubi; 6–4	West Sekiwake; 5–4; 1d
1918	East Sekiwake; 3–7	Sat out
1919	East Maegashira #8; 7–2–1	East Maegashira #4; 2–3–5
1920	East Maegashira #8; 7–3	West Maegashira #3; 7–3
1921	West Maegashira #1; 8–2	East Komusubi; 3–6–1
1922	East Maegashira #3; 1–9	West Maegashira #6; 3–7
1923	East Maegashira #10; 6–4	West Maegashira #2; 1–5–5
1924	West Maegashira #8; Retired –	x
Record given as win-loss-absent Top Division Champion Top Division Runner-up Retired Lower Divisions Key:d=Draw(s) (引分); h=Hold(s) (預り); Divisions: Makuuchi — Jūryō — Makushita — Sandanme — Jonidan — Jonokuchi Makuuchi ranks: Yokozuna — Ōzeki — Sekiwake — Komusubi — Maegashira

== See also ==
- Glossary of sumo terms
- List of past sumo wrestlers
- List of sumo tournament top division champions
