= List of sumo tournament top division champions =

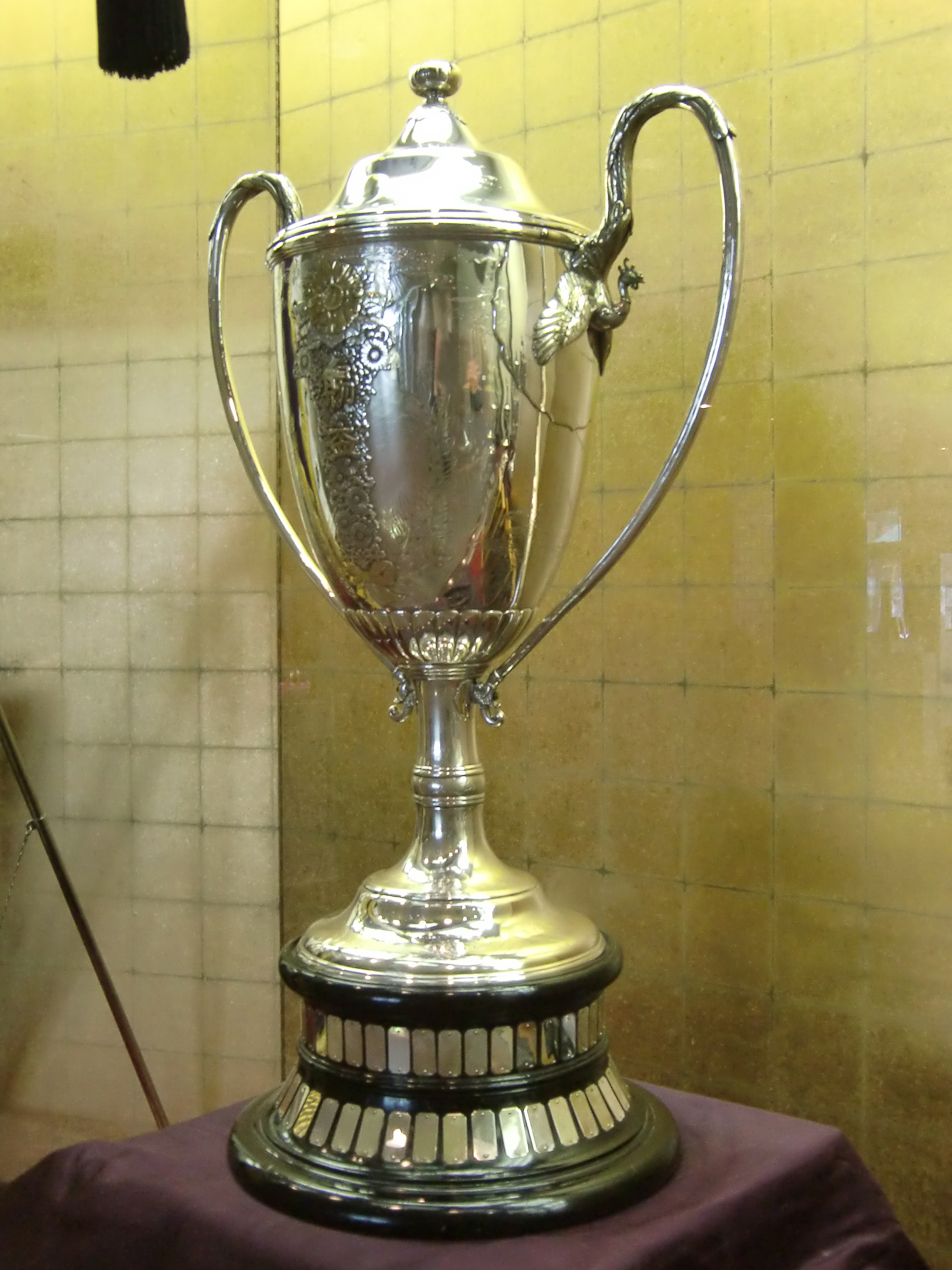
The Emperor's Cup has been awarded to the winner of top division tournaments since 1925.

This is a list of all professional sumo wrestlers who have won the championship for the top division makuuchi at a Japanese grand sumo tournament since 1909, when the current championship system was established.

== 1958 to present ==
The table lists all makuuchi champions since 1958, the advent of the bimonthly tournament schedule. The championship is determined by the wrestler with the highest win–loss score after fifteen bouts, held at a rate of one per day over the duration of the 15-day tournament. In the event of a tie for first place, a play-off is held between the wrestlers concerned.

Below a wrestler's ring name (shikona) their rank and win–loss score that tournament are given. –P indicates an additional bout fought in a yūshō playoff. Number of championships are given in parentheses. (x) marks a singular career championship. ^{†} marks a shikona before a name change. ^{‡} marks a shikona after a name change. Names in bold mark an undefeated tournament victory. Names in italics mark a victory by a maegashira, a wrestler ranked outside of the privileged san'yaku ranks.

	January	March	May	July	September	November
year in sumo	Tokyo	Osaka	Tokyo	Nagoya	Tokyo	Kyushu
2027	**(10–24 Jan)**	**(14–28 Mar)**	**(9–23 May)**	**(11–25 Jul)**	**(12–26 Sep)**	**(14–28 Nov)**
2026	Aonishiki; Ow 12–3–P (2)	Kirishima II^{‡} Se 12–3 (3)	Wakatakakage; Ke 12–3–P (2)	Aonishiki; S2w 12–3–PP (3)	Ōnosato; Ye 12–3 (6)	Ōnosato; Ye 13–2–P (7)
2025	Hōshōryū; O1w 12–3–PP (2)	Ōnosato; Oe 12–3–P (3)	Ōnosato; Oe 14–1 (4)	Kotoshoho; M15e 13–2 (x)	Ōnosato; Ye 13–2–P (5)	Aonishiki; Se 12–3–P (1)
2024	Terunofuji; Y 13–2–P (9)	Takerufuji; M17e 13–2 (x)	Ōnosato; Kw 12–3 (1)	Terunofuji; Y 12–3–P (10)	Ōnosato; S1w 13–2 (2)	Kotozakura II; O1e 14–1 (x)
2023	Takakeishō; O 12–3 (3)	Kiribayama^{†} S2e 12–3–P (1)	Terunofuji; Y 14–1 (8)	Hōshōryū; S1e 12–3–P (1)	Takakeishō; O1w 11–4–P (4)	Kirishima II^{‡} O1w 13–2 (2)
2022	Mitakeumi; Se 13–2 (3)	Wakatakakage; Se 12–3–P (1)	Terunofuji; Y 12–3 (7)	Ichinojō; M2w 12–3 (x)	Tamawashi; M3e 13–2 (2)	Abi; M9w 12–3–PP (x)
2021	Daieishō; M1w 13–2 (x)	Terunofuji (Note: Due to the COVID-19 pandemic in Japan, the tournament was held in Tokyo to avoid unnecessary domestic travel.); Se 12–3 (3)	Terunofuji; O2w 12–3–P (4)	**Hakuhō**; Y 15–0 (45)	Terunofuji; Yw 13–2 (5)	**Terunofuji**; Y 15–0 (6)
2020	Tokushōryū; M17w 14–1 (x)	Hakuhō; Ye 13–2 (44)	**Not held** (COVID-19)	Terunofuji; M17e 13–2 (2)	Shōdai; S1e 13–2 (x)	Takakeishō; O1e 13–2–P (2)
2019	Tamawashi; Sw 13–2 (1)	**Hakuhō**; Ye 15–0 (42)	Asanoyama; M8w 12–3 (x)	Kakuryū; Ye 14–1 (6)	Mitakeumi; Se 12–3–P (2)	Hakuhō; Yw 14–1 (43)
2018	Tochinoshin; M3w 14–1 (x)	Kakuryū; Y1e 13–2 (4)	Kakuryū; Y1e 14–1 (5)	Mitakeumi; Sw 13–2 (1)	**Hakuhō**; Y1w 15–0 (41)	Takakeishō; Ke 13–2 (1)
2017	Kisenosato; O1e 14–1 (1)	Kisenosato; Y2w 13–2–P (2)	**Hakuhō**; Y2w 15–0 (38)	Hakuhō; Y1e 14–1 (39)	Harumafuji; Y1e 11–4–P (9)	Hakuhō; Y1w 14–1 (40)
2016	Kotoshōgiku; O2e 14–1 (x)	Hakuhō; Y1w 14–1 (36)	**Hakuhō**; Y1e 15–0 (37)	Harumafuji; Y2e 13–2 (8)	**Gōeidō**; O2e 15–0 (x)	Kakuryū; Y1w 14–1 (3)
2015	**Hakuhō**; Y1e 15–0 (33)	Hakuhō; Y1e 14–1 (34)	Terunofuji; S1 12–3 (1)	Hakuhō; Y1e 14–1 (35)	Kakuryū; Y1w 12–3–P (2)	Harumafuji; Y2e 13–2 (7)
2014	Hakuhō; Yw 14–1–P (28)	Kakuryū; O1e 14–1 (1)	Hakuhō; Y1e 14–1 (29)	Hakuhō; Y1e 13–2 (30)	Hakuhō; Y1e 14–1 (31)	Hakuhō; Y1e 14–1 (32)
2013	**Harumafuji**; Yw 15–0 (5)	**Hakuhō**; Yw 15–0 (24)	**Hakuhō**; Ye 15–0 (25)	Hakuhō; Ye 12–3 (26)	Hakuhō; Ye 14–1 (27)	Harumafuji; Yw 14–1 (6)
2012	Baruto; O1e 14–1 (x)	Hakuhō; Y 13–2–P (22)	Kyokutenhō; M7w 12–3–P (x)	**Harumafuji**; O2w 15–0 (3)	**Harumafuji**; O1e 15–0 (4)	Hakuhō; Ye 14–1 (23)
2011	Hakuhō; Y 14–1 (18)	**Not held** (match-fixing)	Hakuhō; Y 13–2 (19)	Harumafuji; O1w 14–1 (2)	Hakuhō; Y 13–2 (20)	Hakuhō; Y 14–1 (21)
2010	Asashōryū; Yw 13–2 (25)	**Hakuhō**; Y 15–0 (13)	**Hakuhō**; Y 15–0 (14)	**Hakuhō**; Y 15–0 (15)	**Hakuhō**; Y 15–0 (16)	Hakuhō; Y 14–1–P (17)
2009	Asashōryū; Yw 14–1–P (23)	**Hakuhō**; Yw 15–0 (10)	Harumafuji; O1w 14–1–P (1)	Hakuhō; Ye 14–1 (11)	Asashōryū; Yw 14–1–P (24)	**Hakuhō**; Yw 15–0 (12)
2008	Hakuhō; Ye 14–1 (6)	Asashōryū; Yw 13–2 (22)	Kotoōshū; O2w 14–1 (x)	**Hakuhō**; Yw 15–0 (7)	Hakuhō; Ye 14–1 (8)	Hakuhō; Ye 13–2–P (9)
2007	Asashōryū; Y 14–1 (20)	Hakuhō; O1w 13–2–P (2)	**Hakuhō**; O1e 15–0 (3)	Asashōryū; Ye 14–1 (21)	Hakuhō; Yw 13–2 (4)	Hakuhō; Ye 12–3 (5)
2006	Tochiazuma II; O2e 14–1 (3)	Asashōryū; Y 13–2–P (16)	Hakuhō; O3w 14–1–P (1)	Asashōryū; Y 14–1 (17)	Asashōryū; Y 13–2 (18)	**Asashōryū**; Y 15–0 (19)
2005	**Asashōryū**; Y 15–0 (10)	Asashōryū; Y 14–1 (11)	**Asashōryū**; Y 15–0 (12)	Asashōryū; Y 13–2 (13)	Asashōryū; Y 13–2–P (14)	Asashōryū; Y 14–1 (15)
2004	**Asashōryū**; Y 15–0 (5)	**Asashōryū**; Y 15–0 (6)	Asashōryū; Y 13–2–P (7)	Asashōryū; Y 13–2 (8)	Kaiō; O1e 13–2 (5)	Asashōryū; Y 13–2 (9)
2003	Asashōryū; O1e 14–1 (2)	Chiyotaikai; O2e 13–2 (3)	Asashōryū; Ye 13–2 (3)	Kaiō; O1e 12–3 (4)	Asashōryū; Ye 13–2 (4)	Tochiazuma II; O1w 13–2 (2)
2002	Tochiazuma II; O2w 13–2–P (1)	Musashimaru; Ye 13–2 (10)	Musashimaru; Ye 13–2 (11)	Chiyotaikai; O1e 14–1 (2)	Musashimaru; Ye 13–2 (12)	Asashōryū; O2e 14–1 (1)
2001	Takanohana II^{‡} Y2e 14–1–P (21)	Kaiō; O1e 13–2 (2)	Takanohana II^{‡} Ye 13–2–P (22)	Kaiō; O3e 13–2 (3)	Kotomitsuki; M2e 13–2	Musashimaru; Ye 13–2 (9)
2000	Musōyama; S2e 13–2 (x)	Takatōriki; M14e 13–2 (x)	Kaiō; K1w 14–1 (1)	Akebono; Y1e 13–2 (10)	Musashimaru; Y1w 14–1 (8)	Akebono; Y1w 14–1 (11)
1999	Chiyotaikai; S1e 13–2–P (1)	Musashimaru; O1e 13–2 (4)	Musashimaru; O1e 13–2 (5)	Dejima; S1w 13–2–P (x)	Musashimaru; Y1w 12–3 (6)	Musashimaru; Y1e 12–3 (7)
1998	Musashimaru; O1w 12–3 (3)	Wakanohana III^{‡} O2e 14–1 (4)	Wakanohana III^{‡} O1e 12–3 (5)	Takanohana II^{‡} Y1w 14–1 (19)	Takanohana II^{‡} Y1e 13–2 (20)	Kotonishiki; M12w 14–1 (2)
1997	Wakanohana III^{‡} O1e 14–1 (3)	Takanohana II^{‡} Ye 12–3–PP (16)	Akebono; Yw 13–2–P (9)	Takanohana II^{‡} Ye 13–2 (17)	Takanohana II^{‡} Ye 13–2–P (18)	Takanonami; O1w 14–1–P (2)
1996	Takanonami; O2e 14–1–P (1)	Takanohana II^{‡} Ye 14–1 (12)	Takanohana II^{‡} Ye 14–1 (13)	Takanohana II^{‡} Ye 13–2 (14)	**Takanohana II**^{‡} Ye 15–0 (15)	Musashimaru; O1w 11–4–PPP (2)
1995	Takanohana II^{‡} Ye 13–2–P (8)	Akebono; Yw 14–1 (8)	Takanohana II^{‡} Yw 14–1 (9)	Takanohana II^{‡} Ye 13–2 (10)	**Takanohana II**^{‡} Ye 15–0 (11)	Wakanohana III^{‡} O1w 12–3–P (2)
1994	Takanohana II^{‡} Ow 14–1 (4)	Akebono; Y 12–3–PP (7)	Takanohana II^{‡} Ow 14–1 (5)	**Musashimaru**; O1w 15–0 (1)	**Takanohana II^{‡}** O2w 15–0 (6)	**Takanohana II**^{‡} O1e 15–0 (7)
1993	Akebono; Oe 13–2 (3)	Wakahanada^{†} K1e 14–1 (1)	Takanohana II^{‡} Oe 14–1 (3)	Akebono; Y 13–2–PP (4)	Akebono; Y 14–1 (5)	Akebono; Y 13–2–P (6)
1992	Takahanada^{†} M2e 14–1 (1)	Konishiki; Oe 13–2 (3)	Akebono; Sw 13–2 (1)	Mitoizumi; M1w 13–2 (x)	Takahanada^{†} K1w 14–1 (2)	Akebono; O1w 14–1 (2)
1991	Kirishima I Oe 14–1 (x)	Hokutoumi^{‡} Y1e 13–2 (8)	Asahifuji; Y2e 14–1–P (4)	Kotofuji; M13e 14–1 (x)	Kotonishiki; M5e 13–2 (1)	Konishiki; Ow 13–2 (2)
1990	Chiyonofuji; Y1e 14–1 (30)	Hokutoumi^{‡} Y1w 13–2–PPP (6)	Asahifuji; O2w 14–1 (2)	Asahifuji; O1e 14–1 (3)	Hokutoumi^{‡} Y2e 14–1 (7)	Chiyonofuji; Y2e 13–2 (31)
1989	Hokutoumi^{‡} Y2e 14–1–P (4)	Chiyonofuji; Y1w 14–1 (27)	Hokutoumi^{‡} Y2e 13–2–P (5)	Chiyonofuji; Y2e 12–3–P (28)	**Chiyonofuji**; Y1w 15–0 (29)	Konishiki; O2w 14–1 (1)
1988	Asahifuji; O1e 14–1 (1)	Ōnokuni; Y2e 13–2–P (2)	Chiyonofuji; Y2e 14–1 (23)	**Chiyonofuji**; Y1e 15–0 (24)	**Chiyonofuji**; Y1e 15–0 (25)	Chiyonofuji; Y1e 14–1 (26)
1987	Chiyonofuji; Ye 12–3–P (20)	Hokutoumi^{‡} O1w 12–3 (2)	**Ōnokuni**; O1w 15–0 (1)	Chiyonofuji; Y1e 14–1 (21)	Hokutoumi^{‡} Y1w 14–1 (3)	**Chiyonofuji**; Y2e 15–0 (22)
1986	Chiyonofuji; Ye 13–2 (15)	Hoshi^{†} Sw 13–2 (1)	Chiyonofuji; Y 13–2 (16)	Chiyonofuji; Y 14–1–P (17)	Chiyonofuji; Ye 14–1 (18)	Chiyonofuji; Ye 13–2 (19)
1985	**Chiyonofuji**; Y1e 15–0 (11)	Asashio IV; O2e 13–2 (x)	Chiyonofuji; Ye 14–1 (12)	Hokuten'yū; O2e 13–2 (2)	**Chiyonofuji**; Ye 15–0 (13)	Chiyonofuji; Ye 14–1 (14)
1984	Takanosato; Y1w 13–2 (4)	Wakashimazu; O1e 14–1 (1)	**Kitanoumi**; Y1w 15–0 (24)	**Wakashimazu**; O2e 15–0 (2)	Tagaryū; M12w 13–2 (x)	Chiyonofuji; Y1w 14–1 (10)
1983	Kotokaze; O1w 14–1–P (2)	**Chiyonofuji**; Ye 15–0 (8)	Hokuten'yū; Se 14–1 (1)	Takanosato; O1e 14–1 (2)	**Takanosato**; Y1w 15–0 (3)	Chiyonofuji; Y1w 14–1 (9)
1982	Kitanoumi; Y1wYO 13–2 (23)	Chiyonofuji; Y1w 13–2 (4)	Chiyonofuji; Y1e 13–2–P (5)	Chiyonofuji; Y1e 12–3 (6)	**Takanosato**; Ow 15–0 (1)	Chiyonofuji; Y1e 14–1 (7)
1981	Chiyonofuji; Se 14–1–P (1)	Kitanoumi; Y1e 13–2 (21)	Kitanoumi; Ye 14–1 (22)	Chiyonofuji; O 14–1 (2)	Kotokaze; Se 12–3 (1)	Chiyonofuji; Y2e 12–3–P (3)
1980	**Mienoumi**; Y1e 15–0 (3)	Kitanoumi; Y1w 13–2 (18)	Kitanoumi; Y1e 14–1 (19)	**Kitanoumi**; Y1e 15–0 (20)	Wakanohana II^{‡} Y1w 14–1 (4)	Wajima; Y2e 14–1 (14)
1979	Kitanoumi; Y2e 14–1 (15)	**Kitanoumi**; Y1e 15–0 (16)	Wakanohana II^{‡} Y1w 14–1 (3)	Wajima; Y2e 14–1–P (13)	Kitanoumi; Y1w 13–2 (17)	Mienoumi; Y1wYO 14–1 (2)
1978	**Kitanoumi**; Yw 15–0 (10)	Kitanoumi; Ye 13–2–P (11)	Kitanoumi; Ye 14–1–P (12)	**Kitanoumi**; Y1e 15–0 (13)	Kitanoumi; Y1e 14–1 (14)	**Wakanohana II**^{‡} Y1w 15–0 (2)
1977	Wajima; Yw 13–2 (10)	**Kitanoumi**; Yw 15–0 (8)	Wakamisugi II^{†} O1w 13–2 (1)	**Wajima**; Yw 15–0 (11)	**Kitanoumi**; Yw 15–0 (9)	Wajima; Yw 14–1 (12)
1976	Kitanoumi; Ye 13–2 (5)	Wajima; Yw 13–2–P (8)	Kitanoumi; Yw 13–2–P (6)	Wajima; Ye 14–1 (9)	Kaiketsu; M4w 14–1 (2)	Kitanoumi; M4w 14–1 (7)
1975	Kitanoumi; Ye 12–3 (3)	Takanohana I Oe 13–2–P (1)	Kitanoumi; Ye 13–2 (4)	Kongō; M1w 13–2 (x)	Takanohana I Ow 12–3–P (2)	Mienoumi; S1e 13–2 (1)
1974	Kitanoumi; Se 14–1 (1)	Wajima; Y1e 12–3 (5)	Kitanoumi; O1e 13–2 (2)	Wajima; Y1e 13–2–P (6)	Wajima; Ye 14–1 (7)	Kaiketsu; K2w 12–3–P (1)
1973	Kotozakura; O1e 14–1 (4)	Kitanofuji; Yw 14–1 (10)	**Wajima**; O1e 15–0 (2)	Kotozakura; Y1w 14–1–P (5)	**Wajima**; Y2e 15–0 (3)	Wajima; Y1e 12–2–1 (4)
1972	Tochiazuma I M5w 11–4 (x)	Hasegawa; S1e 12–3–P (x)	Wajima; S1w 12–3 (1)	Takamiyama II; M4e 13–2 (x)	**Kitanofuji**; Y 15–0 (9)	Kotozakura; O2w 14–1 (3)
1971	Taihō; Y1w 14–1–P (32)	Tamanoumi II^{‡} Y1e 14–1 (5)	**Kitanofuji**; Y2e 15–0 (6)	**Tamanoumi II**^{‡} Yw 15–0 (6)	**Kitanofuji**; Yw 15–0 (7)	Kitanofuji; Y 13–2 (8)
1970	Kitanofuji; 01e 13–2–P (3)	Taihō; Y2e 14–1 (31)	Kitanofuji; Y1w 14–1 (4)	Kitanofuji; Y1e 13–2–P (5)	Tamanoumi II^{‡} Y1w 14–1 (3)	Tamanoumi II^{‡} Y1e 14–1–P (4)
1969	**Taihō**; Ye 15–0 (29)	Kotozakura; O2e 13–2 (2)	Taihō; Yw 13–2 (30)	Kiyokuni; O1e 12–3–P (x)	Tamanoshima^{†} O2w 13–2 (2)	Kitanofuji; O1w 13–2 (2)
1968	Sadanoyama; Y1e 13–2 (6)	Wakanami; M8e 13–2 (x)	Tamanoshima^{†} O1e 13–2 (1)	Kotozakura; O2w 13–2 (1)	Taihō; Yw 14–1 (27)	**Taihō**; Ye 15–0 (28)
1967	**Taihō**; Y1e 15–0 (24)	Kitanofuji; O1e 14–1 (1)	Taihō; Y1e 14–1 (25)	Kashiwado; Y1w 14–1 (5)	**Taihō**; Y2e 15–0 (26)	Sadanoyama; Y1w 12–3 (5)
1966	Kashiwado; Y2w 14–1 (4)	Taihō; Y2e 13–2 (19)	Taihō; Y1e 14–1 (20)	Taihō; Y1e 14–1 (21)	Taihō; Y1e 13–2–P (22)	**Taihō**; Y1e 15–0 (23)
1965	Sadanoyama; O1e 14–1 (3)	Taihō; Y1e 14–1 (16)	Sadanoyama; Y1w 14–1 (4)	Taihō; Y1w 13–2 (17)	Kashiwado; Y2e 12–3–PP (3)	Taihō; Y2e 13–2 (18)
1964	**Taihō**; Ye 15–0 (12)	**Taihō**; Y1e 15–0 (13)	Tochinoumi; Y2e 13–2 (3)	Fujinishiki; M9w 14–1 (x)	Taihō; Y1w 14–1 (14)	Taihō; Y1e 14–1 (15)
1963	Taihō; Ye 14–1 (9)	Taihō; Ye 14–1 (10)	**Taihō**; Ye 15–0 (11)	Kitabayama; O3e 13–2–P (x)	**Kashiwado**; Yw 15–0 (2)	Tochinoumi; O1w 14–1 (2)
1962	Taihō; Y1e 13–2 (5)	Sadanoyama; S2e 13–2–P (2)	Tochinoumi; S1w 14–1 (1)	Taihō; Ye 14–1 (6)	Taihō; Ye 13–2–P (7)	Taihō; Ye 13–2 (8)
1961	Kashiwado; O1w 13–2 (1)	Asashio III; Yw 13–2 (5)	Sadanoyama; M13w 12–3 (1)	Taihō; O1e 13–2 (2)	Taihō; O1e 12–3–PP (3)	Taihō; Y1w 13–2 (4)
1960	Tochinishiki; Y1e 14–1 (10)	**Wakanohana I** Y2e 15–0 (8)	Wakamisugi I M4w 14–1 (x)	Wakanohana I Ye 13–2 (9)	Wakanohana I Ye 13–2 (10)	Taihō; S1e 13–2 (1)
1959	Wakanohana I Y1e 14–1 (5)	Tochinishiki; Yw 14–1 (8)	Wakanohana I Y2e 14–1–P (6)	**Tochinishiki**; Y1e 15–0 (9)	Wakanohana I Y1wYO 14–1 (7)	Wakahaguro; Oe 13–2 (x)
1958	Wakanohana I O1e 13–2 (2)	Asashio III; Oe 13–2–P (3)	Tochinishiki; Y2e 14–1 (7)	Wakanohana I Y2e 13–2 (3)	Wakanohana I Y1e 14–1 (4)	Asashio III; O1w 14–1 (4)

== 1909 to 1957 ==
The tables list all makuuchi champions until 1957, before the conception of the current bimonthly schedule. The system was less regularized between years, with a different number of tournaments held at different times and in different venues, and often with a changing number of bouts fought in each tournament.

Playoffs were first introduced in 1947. From 1909 until 1946 a tie for first place would not be resolved, but rather the highest ranked wrestler would automatically be considered the champion.

	January	March	May	September	November
	Tokyo	Osaka	Tokyo	Tokyo	Kyushu
1957	Chiyonoyama; Y2w 15–0 (6)	Asashio III; S1w 13–2 (2)	Annenyama; K1w 13–2 (x)	Tochinishiki; Y1e 13–2 (6)	Tamanoumi I M14e 15–0 (x)

	New Year	Spring	Summer	Autumn
	Tokyo	Osaka	Tokyo	Tokyo
1956	Kagamisato; Y1e 14–1–P (3)	Asashio III; S1e 12–3–PP (1)	Wakanohana I O1e 12–3–P (1)	Kagamisato; Y1w 14–1 (4)
1955	Chiyonoyama; Y1e 12–3–P (4)	Chiyonoyama; Y1e 13–2–P (5)	Tochinishiki; Y1w 14–1 (5)	Kagamisato; Y1w 14–1 (2)
1954	Yoshibayama; O1e 15–0 (x)	Mitsuneyama; Oe 12–3 (x)	Tochinishiki; Ow 14–1 (3)	Tochinishiki; Oe 14–1 (4)
1953	Kagamisato; O1e 14–1 (1)	Tochinishiki; Oe 14–1 (2)	Tokitsuyama; M6e 15–0 (x)	Azumafuji; Y1w 14–1 (6)

	Spring	Summer	Autumn
	Tokyo	Tokyo	Tokyo
1952	Haguroyama; Y2e 15–0 (7)	Azumafuji; Y2w 13–2 (5)	Tochinishiki; S1w 14–1 (1)
1951	Terukuni; Y1e 15–0 (2)	Chiyonoyama; O1e 14–1 (3)	Azumafuji; Y1e 13–1–1a (4)
1950	Chiyonoyama; O1e 12–3 (2)	Azumafuji; Y1w 14–1 (3)	Terukuni; Y2e 13–2–P (1)
1949	Azumafuji; Y2w 10–2–1d (2)	Masuiyama; Ow 13–2–P (2)	Chiyonoyama; O1w 13–2 (1)
1948	Not held	Azumafuji; O2w 10–1 (1)	Masuiyama; Sw 10–1–P (1)
1947	Not held	Haguroyama; Ye 9–1–PP (5)	Haguroyama; Y1e 10–1 (6)
1946	Not held	Not held	Haguroyama; Y1w 13–0 (4)
1945	Not held	Bishūyama; M1e 7–0 (x)	Haguroyama; Y1w 10–0 (3)
1944	Saganohana; Kw 13–2 (x)	Haguroyama; Y1e 10–0 (2)	Maedayama; Ow 9–1 (x)
1943	Futabayama; Y1w 15–0 (11)	Futabayama; Y1e 15–0 (12)	Not held
1942	Futabayama; Y1e 14–1 (9)	Futabayama; Ye 13–2 (10)	Not held
1941	Futabayama; Yw 14–1 (8)	Haguroyama; O1w 14–1 (1)	Not held
1940	Futabayama; Ye 14–1 (7)	Akinoumi; S1w 14–1 (x)	Not held
1939	Dewaminato; M17w 13–0 (x)	Futabayama; Y1e 15–0 (6)	Not held
1938	Futabayama; Y1w 13–0 (4)	Futabayama; Y1e 13–0 (5)	Not held
1937	Futabayama; O1e 11–0 (2)	Futabayama; O1e 13–0 (3)	Not held
1936	Tamanishiki; Ye 11–0 (9)	Futabayama; Sw 11–0 (1)	Not held
1935	Tamanishiki; Y 10–1 (7)	Tamanishiki; Y 10–1 (8)	Not held
1934	Minanogawa^{‡} w 9–2 (2)	Shimizugawa; O1w 11–0 (3)	Not held
1933	Asashio^{†} M9eBS 11–0 (1)	Tamanishiki; Y 10–1 (6)	Not held

	Spring	March	Summer	October
	Tokyo	varied	Tokyo	varied
1932	Shimizugawa; S1w 8–0 (1)	Okitsuumi; K1w 9–1 (x)	Tamanishiki; O1e 10–1 (5)	Shimizugawa; O2e 9–2 (2)
1931	Tamanishiki; O1e 9–2 (3)	Tamanishiki; O1e 10–1 (4)	Musashiyama; K1e 10–1 (x)	Ayazakura; M4e 10–1 (x)
1930	Toyokuni; O1w 9–2 (2)	Tsunenohana; Y1e 10–1 (10)	Yamanishiki; M5e 11–0 (x)	Tamanishiki; O2w 9–2 (2)
1929	Tamanishiki; S1e 10–1 (1)	Toyokuni; O1w 9–2 (1)	Tsunenohana; Y1e 10–1 (8)	Tsunenohana; Y1e 8–3 (9)
1928	Hitachiiwa; O1e 10–1 (x)	Noshirogata; O1e 10–1–1d (x)	Tsunenohana; Y1w 11–0 (7)	Miyagiyama; Y1e 9–2 (2)
1927	Miyagiyama; Y2e 10–1 (1)	Tsunenohana; Y1w 10–1 (4)	Tsunenohana; Y1w 10–1 (5)	Tsunenohana; Y1e 10–1 (6)

- March tournaments were held at the following locations: 1927, 1929, 1930 and October 1931 in Osaka; 1928 and 1931 in Nagoya; 1932 in Kyoto.
- October tournaments were held at the following locations: 1927 and 1932 in Kyoto, 1928 in Hiroshima, 1929 in Nagoya, 1930 in Fukuoka, 1931 in Osaka.
- The October 1929 tournament was actually held in September.
- The Spring 1932 tournament was actually held in February.

	Spring	Summer
1926	Tsunenohana; Yw 11–0 (3)	Orochiyama; M8w 10–1 (x)
1925	Tochigiyama; Y1e 10–0–1d (9)	Nishinoumi III; Y2e 9–2 (x)
1924	Tochigiyama; Yw 9–0–1d (7)	Tochigiyama; Y1e 10–1 (8)
1923	Tochigiyama; Y2e 8–1–1d (6)	Tsunenohana; Ow 9–0–1d–1a (2)
1922	Tsurugahama; M4e 9–1 (x)	Ōnishiki; Y2w 8–1–1d (5)
1921	Ōnishiki; Y1w 10–0 (4)	Tsunenohana; Oe 10–0 (1)
1920	Ōnishiki; Y2e 8–1–1d (2)	Ōnishiki; Y1w 9–1 (3)
1919	Tochigiyama; Y1e 9–0–1 (4)	Tochigiyama; Y1e 10–0 (5)
1918	Tochigiyama; O1e 10–0 (2)	Tochigiyama; Y2e 9–1 (3)
1917	Ōnishiki; O1w 10–0 (1)	Tochigiyama; O1w 9–0–1a (1)
1916	Nishinoumi II; O1e 8–0–1–1d (x)	Tachiyama; Y1w 10–0 (9)
1915	Ōtori; O1w 10–0 (2)	Tachiyama; Y1w 10–0 (8)
1914	Tachiyama; Y1e 10–0 (7)	Ryōgoku; M14e 9–0–1 (x)
1913	Ōtori; O1w 7–0–1–1d–1a (1)	Tachiyama; Y1e 10–0 (6)
1912	Tachiyama; Y1e 8–1–1d (4)	Tachiyama; Y1w 10–0 (5)
1911	Tachiyama; O1w 8–0–1d–1a (2)	Tachiyama; Y1w 10–0 (3)
1910	Hitachiyama; Ye 7–0–1–2d (x)	Tachiyama; O1w 9–0–1d (1)
1909	see below	Takamiyama I M7e 7–0–3d (x)

- Any tournaments predating the second tournament of 1909 did not recognize or award a championship as the yūshō system giving the wrestler with the best tournament record a prize was first introduced by the Mainichi newspaper only in the second half of 1909, and later officially integrated by the JSA in 1926.
- All tournaments were held in Tokyo with the following exceptions: 1918 and 1919, all four in Osaka; Spring 1924 in Nagoya.
- All tournaments were held in either January or May with the following exceptions: Spring 1911 and 1923 in February; Summer 1909, 1910, 1911, 1914 and 1915 in June.
- Any tournaments predating the Summer 1909 did not recognize or award a championship. As a consequence of this, yokozuna Hitachiyama had seven pre-1909 mathematical "championship" equivalents that are uncounted here, and yokozuna Tachiyama had two.

== Most career championships ==
Official (since 1909)

Champions with >10 wins
	Name	Total	Years
1	Hakuhō	45	2006–21
2	Taihō	32	1960–71
3	Chiyonofuji	31	1981–90
4	Asashōryū	25	2002–10
5	Kitanoumi	24	1974–84
6	Takanohana II^{‡}	22	1992–2001
7	Wajima	14	1972–80
8	Futabayama	12	1936–43
8	Musashimaru	12	1994–2002
10	Akebono	11	1992–2000

Champions with 8–10 wins
	Name	Total	Years
11	Tsunenohana	10	1921–30
11	Tochinishiki	10	1952–60
11	Wakanohana I	10	1956–60
11	Kitanofuji	10	1966–73
11	Terunofuji	10	2015–24
16	Tachiyama	9*	1904–16
16	Tochigiyama	9	1917–25
16	Tamanishiki	9	1929–36
16	Harumafuji	9	2009–17
20	Hokutoumi	8	1986–91

Unofficial (before 1909)

Top champions before 1909
	Name	Total	Years	Highest rank
1	Raiden	28	1790–1810	Ōzeki
2	Tanikaze	21	1772–93	Yokozuna
3	Kashiwado	16	1812–22	Ōzeki
4	Inazuma	10	1824–37	Yokozuna
5	Hitachiyama	9*	1899–1910	Yokozuna
5	Umegatani I	9	1874–84	Yokozuna

^Wrestler is currently active.

== See also ==
- List of active sumo wrestlers
- List of past sumo wrestlers
- List of sumo top division runners-up
- List of sumo second division champions
- List of active special prize winners
- List of sumo record holders
- List of years in sumo
- Glossary of sumo terms
