= Shunjuen Incident =

Strike of sumo wrestlers in 1932

Shunjuen Incident 春秋園事件
- Shunshūen jiken
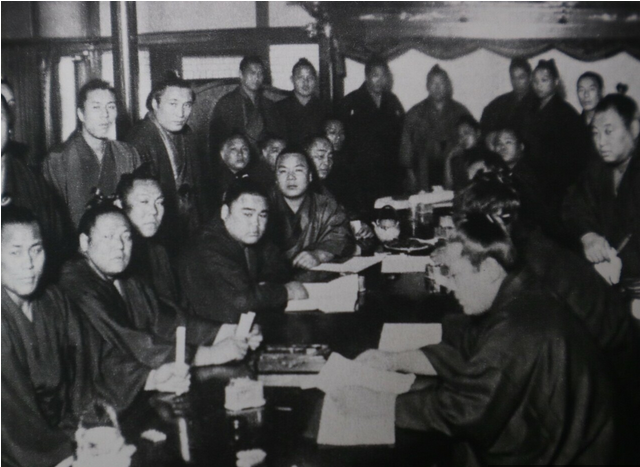
- Sumo wrestlers barricaded in Shunjuen restaurant on January 6, 1932
- Date: January 6, 1932
- Location: Tokyo; Japan
- Goals: Full scale reforms from the Sumo Association executives to improve wrestlers living conditions.
- Methods: Strike
- Result: Expulsion of the 48 strikers Foundation of the Kansai Sumo Association (Kansai Kakuryoku Kyokai, 関西角力協会) Resignation of several Sumo Association stablemasters

Parties
Striking wrestlers	Greater Japan Sumo Association

Lead figures
Tenryū Saburō; Ōnosato Mansuke	Asashio Tarō II; Ryōgoku Kajinosuke I

Number
48 rikishi 32 from Dewanoumi ichimon	Sumo Association board of directors

The Shunjuen Incident (春秋園事件, Shunshūen jiken), also known as the 'Tenryū Incident' or 'Tenryū-Ōnosato Incident' (after the ring name of its ringleaders), was an unprecedented strike launched by professional sumo wrestlers that occurred on January 6, 1932, when 32 wrestlers from the Dewanoumi ichimon went on strike against the Greater Japan Sumo Association, demanding that the organization improve its constitution. The name of the incident derives from the Chinese restaurant Shunjuen (in Shinagawa, Tokyo), in which the strikers vowed to unite and locked themselves in.

== Context ==
Signs of discontent emerged in the Sumo world in the middle of the 1860s, when a group of wrestlers from the Takasago ichimon tried to engage the Tokyo Sumo Association in discussions over a potential reform. This first reform movement didn't succeed and lost momentum during the Meiji restoration in 1867. However, it had regrouped a list of demands to advocate for a sumo reform in 1873. As a result, the wrestlers were expelled from professional sumo in December 1873. The leaders of this first movement briefly established a "reform wrestling team", touring in Japan for a time before being reinstated in Tokyo-sumo. A number of reforms were however carried out, most notably the elections of chairmen instead of their nomination by governors.
During the 10 years from the Great Kantō earthquake to the Mukden Incident of 1931, Japan's economy was in the midst of the Shōwa Depression. During these times, the political climate was unstable and labor-management conflicts were frequent with the rise of socialist movements in many areas. The life of sumo wrestlers was rather difficult, and from the Meiji era to the early Shōwa era, there were frequent incidents of disputes that could be called "rikishi strikes". With damaged Japanese businesses, patrons were less inclined to sponsor sumo wrestlers and unemployed Japanese citizens were unable to afford tickets. Hence, sumo attendances dropped, leaving the sumōtori wages to a historical low. At that time, the average salary of a san'yaku wrestler was 70 yen, a salary which was the same of a government public servant. Meanwhile, the starting salary of a Tokyo University student was 50 yen, and 45 yen for a graduate of a private university. In addition, at that time, the Sumo Association's accounting was unclear, and the wrestlers had no idea how much income they received or how much money they spent on expenses. Stablemasters would also take their share of profits and wrestlers had no good income.

== Conflict ==
=== Unfolding of events ===
On January 6, 1932, the day after the banzuke was announced, several wrestlers of the Dewanoumi stable — 20 makuuchi, 11 jūryō and one makushita — went out to be treated to Chinese cuisine restaurant Shunjuen in Shinagawa, Tokyo, at the demand of sekiwake Tenryū who invited them. At the banquet, Tenryū's delivered a speech advocating for a "reform of sumo society". They vowed to unite and locked themselves in the Shunjuen restaurant to gather their demands to the Association and issued a number of proclamations.

=== Proclamations ===
Immediately after the wrestlers came with demands, four rikishi, Ōnosato (ōzeki), Musashiyama (ōzeki), Tenryū (sekiwake), and Ayazakura (komusubi), went to the Association and submitted ten demands from the rikishi side, demanding a response within 48 hours:

1. Establish an auditing system for the whole Sumo Association and make public the revenues received and expenses used.
2. Change of the basho scheduled hours and conduct the summer basho in the evening.
3. Lower entrance fees, develop the popularity of sumo and reduce of the number of reserved seatings while increasing the number of general admission seats.
4. Abolish the teahouse (chaya) system.
5. Gradually eliminate the toshiyori system.
6. Establish an annuity for wrestlers.
7. Reform the jungyō system.
8. Increase wrestlers income while maintaining their living standards.
9. Better manage the Association's excessive number of employees by dismissing them.
10. Establish a "wrestlers' association" based on a mutual aid system.

While the improvement of their own treatment is at the root of the demands, the first half of the demands contained constructive requests to the Sumo Association for reform because the introduction of an accounting system, the elimination of the sumo teahouses, and the gradual abolition of the toshiyori system were probably because the wrestlers felt that it was unclear how the income from the entertainment businesses was distributed. The JSA, concerned about the worsening situation, sent stablemasters Fujishima (former Tsunenohana) and Kasugano (former Tochigiyama) to the restaurant to urge Tenryū and Ōnosato, the main leaders of the strike, to change their minds. In the end, the Association's response to the strikers on January 7 was considered insincere and lacking in substantive answers. Eventually, the negotiations collapsed and the strikers felt that it "almost omitted or disagreed with the most important demands".

=== Split from the Sumo Association ===
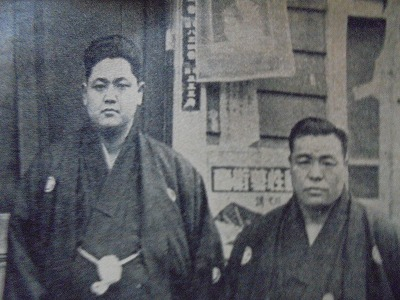
Tenryū (left) and Ōnosato (right) after they cut off their ōichōmage

When news spread that the mediation was unsuccessful, Kagamiiwa and ten non-Dewanoumi stable wrestlers (including Minanogawa), who had been sitting on the sidelines until then, joined in. To show their determination, thirty rikishi performed the ōichōmage cutting ceremony and sent the hairs in signed papers to the Sumo Association headquarter before formally proclaiming their withdrawal from the Association. Meanwhile, the Sumo Association announced the formal expulsion of the 48 wrestlers who went on strike and postponed until further notice every tournament (an unusual decision, considering how rare it is to cancel sumo tournaments). Several stablemasters and coaches, including Ryōgoku Kajinosuke (Dewanoumi), Asashio Tarō II (Takasago) and former gyōji Kimura Soshiro (Irumagawa) resigned in the form of taking responsibility for their apprentices actions and the failure of the negotiations.

The January 1932 honbasho became a phantom tournament as about half of the ranking was dominated by wrestlers from the Dewanoumi stable and no tournament was ever associated with it. Of the 62 sekitori, only 11 makuuchi and three jūryō remained with the Sumo Association. The Sumo Association was faced with an unprecedented crisis never before seen in the history of professional sumo.

==== List of strikers ====
Result legend
shikona (stable)
L/E	Strikers who either left or were expelled
S	Wrestlers who stayed

East	Result	Makuuchi	West	Result
Tamanishiki (Kumegawa)	S	O	Musashiyama (Dewanoumi)	L/E
Noshirogata (Nishikijima)	S	OHD	Ōnosato (Dewanoumi)	L/E
Shimizugawa (Hatachiyama)	S	S	Tenryū (Dewanoumi)	L/E
Hatasegawa (Isegahama)	S	K	Ayazakura (Dewanoumi)	L/E
Okitsūmi (Wakafuji)	S	M1	Dewagatake (Dewanoumi)	L/E
Kagamiiwa (Kumekawa)	L/E	M2	Shinobuyama (Dewanoumi)	L/E
Asashio (Takasago)	L/E	M3	Wakashima (Dewanoumi)	L/E
Takanobori (Takasago)	S	M4	Yamanishiki (Dewanoumi)	L/E
Nishikinada (Izutsu)	L/E	M5	Fujinosato (Dewanoumi)	L/E
Tarōyama (Takasago)	L/E	M6	Yamatonishiki (Dewanoumi)	L/E
Rainomine (Tatsunami)	L/E	M7	Shinkai (Dewanoumi)	L/E
Yoshinoyama (Tatsunami)	S	M8	Takanohana (Dewanoumi)	L/E
Wakabayama (Nijuyama)	S	M9	Kinkazan (Onogawa)	L/E
Koganoura (Miyagino)	S	M10	Hishūzan (Dewanoumi)	L/E
Takaragawa (Tomozuna)	L/E	M11	Ōshima (Dewanoumi)	L/E
Ōshio (Michinoku)	S	M12	Tokiwano (Dewanoumi)	L/E
Ayanonami (Minatogawa)	L/E	M13	Hitachishima (Dewanoumi)	L/E
Wakasegawa (Isegahama)	S	M14	Isenohama (Dewanoumi)	L/E
Kaikōzan (Kumekawa)	L/E	M15	Tamaikari (Dewanoumi)	L/E
Tsurugidake (Tatsunami)	L/E	M16	Sotogahama (Dewanoumi)	L/E
East		Jūryō	West	
Tsunenobori (Dewanoumi)	L/E	J1	Asahikawa (Tatsunami)	S
Kaneminato (Minatogawa)	L/E	J2	Ugohibiki (Dewanoumi)	L/E
Choshinada (Dewanoumi)	L/E	J3	Tachiwaka (Takasago)	L/E
Banshinzan (Hakkaku)	L/E	J4	Ayanobori (Dewanoumi)	L/E
Kasumigaura (Dewanoumi)	L/E	J5	Tatekabuto (Nakamura)	L/E
Futabayama (Tatsunami)	S	J6	Narushio (Takasago)	L/E
Shionohama (Takasago)	L/E	J7	Komanishiki (Dewanoumi)	L/E
Banjaku (Asahiyama)	L/E	J8	Yamatoiwa (Dewanoumi)	L/E
Ōtsuru (Kasugano)	L/E	J9	Narumigata (Dewanoumi)	L/E
Ishiyama (Kasugano)	L/E	J10	Ōnohama (Tatsunami)	S
Ayawaka (Dewanoumi)	L/E	J11	Kamimiyayama (Izutsu)	L/E

==== Banzuke of the February 1932 tournament ====
The Sumo Association then revealed a newly revised banzuke for an eight-day tournament held in February 1932. The Sumo Association, in a desperate measure, moved up the remaining wrestlers through the ranks from jūryō to makuuchi and from makushita to jūryō one after the other. This tournament was however a disaster, despite half-price admission fees and eight days of performances, due to the lack of popular figures. The revenue from the eight-day event was only equivalent to one day's worth of revenue from previous tournaments and the Sumo Association was on the verge of extinction.

Result legend
shikona (stable)
S	Wrestlers who stayed
PJ	Wrestlers promoted from jūryō
PM	Wrestlers promoted from makushita

East	Result	Makuuchi	West	Result
Tamanishiki (Kumegawa)	S	O	Musashiyama (Dewanoumi)	S
Noshirogata (Nishikijima)	S	O		
Hatasegawa (Isegahama)	S	S	Shimizugawa (Hatachiyama)	S
Takanobori (Takasago)	S	K	Okitsūmi (Wakafuji)	S
Wakabayama (Hatachiyama)	S	M1	Yoshinoyama (Tatsunami)	S
Ōshio (Michinoku)	S	M2	Koganoura (Miyagino)	S
Asahikawa (Tatsunami)	PJ	M3	Wakasegawa (Isegahama)	S
Ōnohama (Tatsunami)	PJ	M4	Futabayama (Tatsunami)	PJ
Dewanohana (Dewanoumi)	PM	M5	Kuninohama (Izutsu)	PM
Imizugawa (Takasago)	PM	M6	Takagiyama (Furiwake)	PM
		M7	Tamanoura (Dewanoumi)	PM
East		Jūryō	West	
Yoshinoiwa (Dewanoumi)	PM	J1	Taikyuzan (Dewanoumi)	PM
Wakamonryū (Kumegawa)	PM	J2	Ōyashima (Tatsunami)	PM
Hatsushima (Tomozuna)	PM	J3	Kaigetsu (Hanakago)	PM
Torigamine (Miyagino)	PM	J4	Tomoegata (Takachima)	PM
Matsumaeyama (Takachima)	PM	J5	Nanaogata (Tatsunami)	PM
Sendai (Dewanoumi)	PM	J6	Koshinoumi (Wakafuji)	PM
Akitadake (Kasugano)	PM	J7	Toshūzan (Futagoyama)	PM
Ōnami (Takashima)	PM	J8	Ainohana (Oshiogawa)	PM
Raizan (Isenoumi)	PM	J9	Jōyōzan (Dewanoumi)	PM
Hamanoishi (Dewanoumi)	PM	J10	Shimaizumi (Dewanoumi)	PM

Note

1. Musashiyama reluctantly joined the strikers association and eventually decided to stay within the Sumo Association.

== Aftermath ==
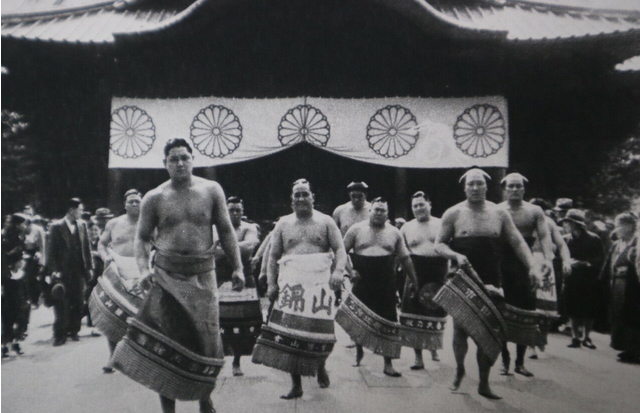
Members of the Dai Nihon Sumo Renmei led by Tenryū (left) in Yasukuni Shrine

The Shunjuen strikers went to create two separate organizations: the "Great Japan Emerging Rikishi Group" (Dainippon Shinjin Rikishi-dan, 大日本新興力士団), by the Dewanoumi ichimon wrestlers, and the "Progressive Rikishi’ Group" (Kakushin rikishi-dan, 革新力士団), by non-Dewanoumi ichimon wrestlers. Both groups jointly organized tournaments and toured the country, performing in various locations such as Hibiya Park. On February 13, 1932, the organizations merged to form the "Greater Japan Sumo Federation" (Dai Nihon Sumo Renmei, 大日本相撲連盟), which held seven days shows in Osaka in March and Nagoya in April of the same year, followed by a 10-day show at the Yasukuni Shrine, in Tokyo, on May 3. The Sumo Renmei worked on a different system than the Greater Japan Sumo Association of the time. The tournaments was a six-day individual competition in which the 31 wrestlers were divided into three ABC classes, with the winners and ranks determined by round-robin competition.

Although temporarily resonating with the first strikers philosophy, the Sumo Renmei grew tired of the new form of sumo and began to drift away from the sport. Eventually Tenryū tried to form the Kansai Sumo Association (Kansai Kakuryoku Kyokai, 関西角力協会) and the unity of the comrades loosened, and from the end of 1932 to January of the following year, 12 makuuchi and 10 jūryō wrestlers left the ranks and returned to the Sumo Association. Meanwhile, the Association had lost a lot of its leading figures, but with the determination to "make up for lack of numbers with enthusiasm," announced a new ranking list centered on then ōzeki Tamanishiki, who remained with the Sumo Association, saying, "I will die for my master". In the spring tournament of January 1933, the popularity of new yokozuna Tamanishiki and the success of 20 returning wrestler, including Kagamiiwa, Minanogawa and Musashiyama (who was one of the first to break away from the strikers organization) restored the prosperity of the Sumo Association's spring and autumn tournaments before the conflict. The Sumo Association, which was on the verge of extinction, began to show signs of recovery. The country was in the midst of an economic boom and, in the world of sumo, Futabayama began a 69-match winning streak on the seventh day of the January tournament in 1936.

The Kansai Sumo Association also continued to exist, but in the shadow of Futabayama's rapid growth. Following a "consolation tour" in occupied Manchuria and Korea, Ōnosato fell ill and had to retire before dying. Without Ōnosato, and failing to create new popular wrestlers, the group began to decline and in December 1937, Tenryū and 32 other remaining wrestlers dissolved the Kansai Sumo Association.

== Questioning the supposed motivations ==
A number of theories surround the real motivations for launching the strike of the Shunjuen incident. Tenryū has a reputation as an opportunist and a revolutionary in the sumo world, sometimes being referred to as a fūunji (風雲児), meaning 'an adventurer who takes advantage of troubled times'. Questionable theories say Tenryū initiated the Shunjuen protest due to his bitterness from being passed over for ōzeki promotion in favor of his rival Musashiyama. Indeed, the latter did get promoted before Tenryū (from komusubi straight to ōzeki) in the January 1932 basho while Tenryū remained sekiwake for six consecutive tournaments despite having a winning record in each. However, Musashiyama did indeed have good enough records to be promoted to ōzeki at the January 1932 tournament. The same theories also impute to Tenryū the recruitment of Ōnosato because the former needed the charisma and the reputation of the latter in order to win the trust of the rikishi.

== Structural evolutions ==
In 1957, an investigation by the National Diet (Committee on Education) into ticket distribution challenged the power of the sumo teahouses system and revealed information about nepotism and arrangements between elders and managers. Former Shunjuen leader Tenryū appeared as a witness before the committee on the issue of the Sumo Association's overly conservative nature, where he had the opportunity to publicly repeat his claims of the past. This investigation led to Sumo Association's chairman Dewanoumi's (former yokozuna Tsunenohana) attempted suicide and reforms such as the introduction of two extra annual tournaments and a modest ticketing reform. After these events, the wrestlers of the first two divisions belonged for a time to a quasi-syndicate called the Rikishi Kai (力士会), presided over by a yokozuna. Since the rikishi kai had no power to negotiate collectively, it sent complaints to the Japan Sumo Association from time to time. These complaints were often taken into consideration, but if nothing happens the wrestlers usually did not go further. In his memoirs, former sekiwake Takamiyama explained that in the rikishi kai meetings, the sekitori sometimes joked about a collective strike, but the action was hardly, if ever, considered. Since the Shunjuen incident, there have been no major incidents of conflict between wrestlers and the Sumo Association. Since sumo's popularity was established by Futabayama, the living conditions of sumo wrestlers have improved. In January 2019, the Association gave a salary raise to its employees thanks to the success of Kisenosato, the first Japanese-born yokozuna in 19 years, which boosted the popularity of sumo.
