= Musashiyama Takeshi =

Japanese sumo wrestler

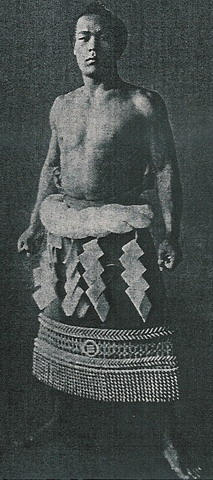
- Musashiyama, circa 1936

Personal information
- Native name: 武藏山 武
- Born: Yokoyama Takeshi; December 5, 1909 Kōhoku, Yokohama, Kanagawa, Japan
- Died: March 15, 1969 (aged 59)
- Height: 1.86 m (6 ft 1 in)
- Weight: 117 kg (258 lb)

Sport
- Sport: Sumo
- Retired: May 1939
- Heya: Dewanoumi
- Record: 240-79-71-2draws
- Debut: January 1926
- Highest rank: Yokozuna (May 1935)
- Elder name: Shiranui
- Championships: 1 (Makuuchi); 1 (Jūryō); 1 (Makushita); 1 (Jonidan)
- Gold Stars: 2 (Miyagiyama)
- Updated on June 2020

Musashiyama Takeshi (Japanese: 武藏山 武; December 5, 1909 – March 15, 1969) was a Japanese professional sumo wrestler from Kōhoku, Yokohama, Kanagawa Prefecture. He was the sport's 33rd yokozuna. He had a rapid rise through the ranks, setting several youth records, and was very popular with the public. However he did not fulfill his great potential at sumo's highest rank, missing many matches because of injury and winning no tournaments.

== Career ==
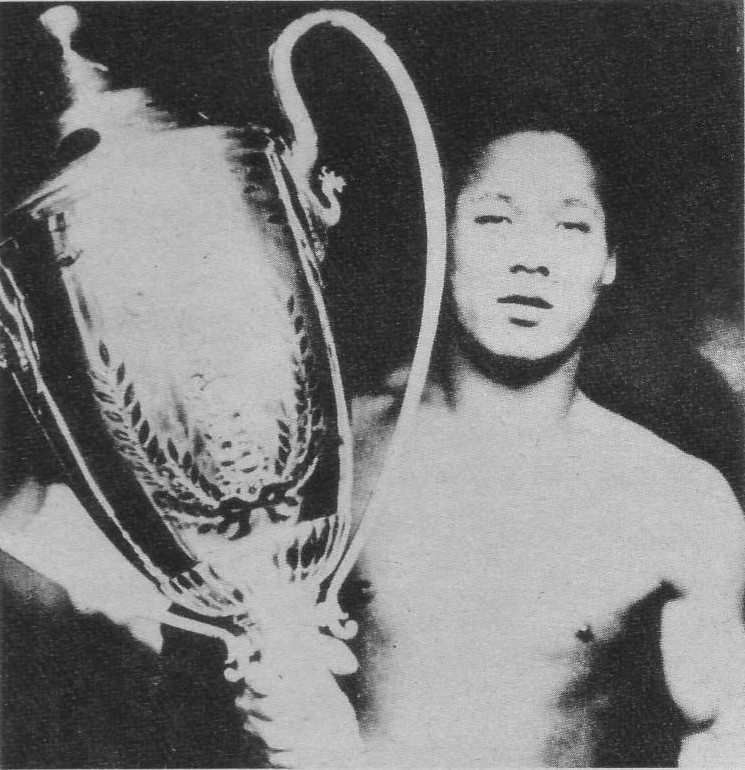
Musashiyama with the Emperor's Cup after winning the May 1931 tournament

Born Yokoyama Takeshi (横山 武) in Kohoku ward, he came from a poor peasant family and entered local sumo tournaments to provide for them. He was scouted by the former Ryōgoku Yūjirō, who persuaded him to join Dewanoumi stable. Musashiyama made his professional debut in January 1926. He was far superior to his early opponents, becoming an elite sekitori at the age of just 19. He reached the top makuuchi division in May 1929, and was runner-up in his second makuuchi tournament. He reached the san'yaku ranks at komusubi in May 1930. His rapid rise was considered miraculous in an era when it was not unusual for new recruits to take several years to even progress from the lowest division. He missed out on the yūshō or tournament championship in March 1931 only because he was of a lower rank than Tamanishiki, who finished with the same score. (There was no playoff system until 1947). However, he won what was to be his only top division championship the next tournament in May 1931.

A lean and handsome wrestler, Musashiyama was popular with tournament crowds. His picture sold more copies than any other wrestler. Fighting alongside other popular rikishi such as Tamanishiki, Minanogawa, and his stable mate, sekiwake Tenryū, Musashiyama was expected to become a figurehead of the sumo world for years to come. Two major events, however, had a severe impact on his career. He injured his right elbow in the October 1931 tournament, which reduced his power and never healed properly. Then in January 1932 he was promoted from komusubi to ōzeki, but in the same month Tenryū and many other top wrestlers went on strike against the Japan Sumo Association, demanding reform of the organization, in what was to become known as the Shunjuen Incident. Musashiyama was criticized for his lukewarm support of the strike, but he never felt close to Tenryū's group. In addition, several people insisted that the reason for Tenryū's walkout was his jealousy of Musashiyama's fast promotion to ōzeki while he remained at sekiwake. Musashiyama had been considering giving up sumo altogether and turning to boxing instead, but eventually decided to stay in the Sumo Association.

He was promoted to yokozuna in 1935, after finishing as runner-up in the May tournament that year. He had had good scores in the previous two tournaments as well, and had never had a make-koshi or losing score in his career. Nevertheless, his promotion at that point came as a surprise, and it was suggested that it had been engineered by the Takasago ichimon or stable group, so that Musashiyama's Dewanoumi group would be obliged to support the promotion of Minanogawa in return. Unfortunately, Musashiyama proved to be one of the least successful yokozuna ever. He was often absent from tournaments because of his elbow injury and did not win any further championships. He was so popular that he was always in demand to perform on regional tours, and rarely had a chance to recuperate properly from his injury. In his eight tournaments at yokozuna rank, he missed five, withdrew from two, and only managed one kachi-koshi or winning score. In his only kachi-koshi tournament, he faced yokozuna Minanogawa in a battle of two 6–6 yokozuna, and he defeated Minanogawa, which resulted in his opponent having a make-koshi, a very rare result for a yokozuna. He retired at the age of 29 without achieving any lasting success as a yokozuna, in May 1939. He had long been overshadowed by Futabayama, then at the peak of his career.

== Retirement from sumo ==
He remained in the sumo world for a time as a coach, and was known as Dekiyama and then Shiranui Oyakata. However, he left the Sumo Association in 1945. He tried his hand at farming, running a restaurant and operating a pachinko parlour in Tokyo, before returning to his home town to work in the real estate business. He died in 1969. His son also became a sumo wrestler at Dewanoumi stable but did not rise higher than the makushita division.

== Career record ==
- In 1927 Tokyo and Osaka sumo merged and four tournaments a year in Tokyo and other locations began to be held.

Musashiyama Takeshi
-	Spring Haru basho, varied	Summer Natsu basho, varied
1926	(Maezumo)	West Jonokuchi #19; 5–1
Record given as wins–losses–absences Top division champion Top division runner-up Retired Lower divisions Non-participation Sanshō key: F=Fighting spirit; O=Outstanding performance; T=Technique Also shown: ★=Kinboshi; P=Playoff(s); Divisions: Makuuchi — Jūryō — Makushita — Sandanme — Jonidan — Jonokuchi Makuuchi ranks: Yokozuna — Ōzeki — Sekiwake — Komusubi — Maegashira

-	Spring Haru basho, Tokyo	March Sangatsu basho, varied	Summer Natsu basho, Tokyo	October Jūgatsu basho, varied
1927	East Jonidan #28; 4–2	East Jonidan #28; 6–0; Champion	West Sandanme #48; 6–0	East Sandanme #11; 5–1
1928	West Makushita #25; 5–1	West Makushita #15; 6–0	East Makushita #2; 6–0; Champion	East Makushita #2; 3–3
1929	West Jūryō #4; 11–0; Champion	West Jūryō #4; 9–2	East Maegashira #8; 9–2	East Maegashira #8; 7–4
1930	East Maegashira #2; 9–2 ★	East Maegashira #2; 8–3 ★	East Komusubi; 6–5	East Komusubi; 9–2
1931	West Komusubi; 7–4	West Komusubi; 10–1	East Komusubi; 10–1	East Komusubi; 8–2–1
1932	West Ōzeki; 5–3	West Ōzeki; 7–3	West Ōzeki; 8–3	West Ōzeki; 8–3
Record given as wins–losses–absences Top division champion Top division runner-up Retired Lower divisions Non-participation Sanshō key: F=Fighting spirit; O=Outstanding performance; T=Technique Also shown: ★=Kinboshi; P=Playoff(s); Divisions: Makuuchi — Jūryō — Makushita — Sandanme — Jonidan — Jonokuchi Makuuchi ranks: Yokozuna — Ōzeki — Sekiwake — Komusubi — Maegashira

-	Spring Haru basho, Tokyo	Summer Natsu basho, Tokyo	Autumn Aki basho, Tokyo
1933	West Ōzeki; 8–3	East Ōzeki; 6–4; 1d	Not held
1934	East Ōzeki; 8–3	East Ōzeki; 9–2	Not held
1935	West Ōzeki; 8–2; 1d	East Ōzeki; 9–2	Not held
1936	West Yokozuna; 3–5–3	West Yokozuna; 0–0–11	Not held
1937	East Yokozuna; 0–0–11	East Yokozuna; 0–0–13	Not held
1938	West Yokozuna; 5–4–4	West Yokozuna; 7–6	Not held
1939	West Yokozuna; 0–0–11	East Yokozuna; Retired; 0–0–15	x
Record given as win-loss-absent Top Division Champion Top Division Runner-up Retired Lower Divisions Key: ★=Kinboshi(s); d=Draw(s) (引分); h=Hold(s) (預り); Divisions: Makuuchi — Jūryō — Makushita — Sandanme — Jonidan — Jonokuchi Makuuchi ranks: Yokozuna — Ōzeki — Sekiwake — Komusubi — Maegashira

== See also ==
- Glossary of sumo terms
- List of past sumo wrestlers
- List of sumo tournament top division champions
- List of sumo tournament second division champions
- List of yokozuna

Preceded by Tamanishiki San'emon	33rd Yokozuna; 1935–1939	Succeeded by Minanogawa Tōzō
Yokozuna is not a successive rank, and more than one wrestler can hold the title at once
