= Tamanishiki San'emon =

Japanese sumo wrestler (1903–1938)

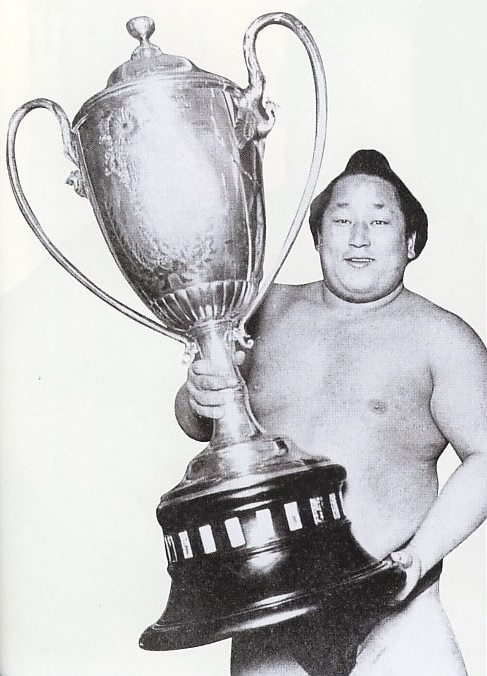
- Tamanishiki holding the Emperor's Cup

Personal information
- Native name: 玉錦 三右衛門
- Born: Nishinouchi Yasuki; December 15, 1903 Kōchi, Japan
- Died: December 4, 1938 (aged 34)
- Height: 1.74 m (5 ft 8 1/2 in)
- Weight: 140 kg (309 lb)

Sport
- Sport: Sumo
- Heya: Nishonoseki
- Record: 308-92-17-3draws (Makuuchi)
- Debut: January 1919
- Highest rank: Yokozuna (November 1932)
- Elder name: Nishonoseki
- Championships: 9 (Makuuchi)
- Updated on June 2020

Tamanishiki San'emon (Japanese: 玉錦 三右衛門; Japanese pronunciation: [ta.ma.ɲiꜜ.ɕi̥.kʲi], December 15, 1903 – December 4, 1938) was a Japanese professional sumo wrestler from Kōchi. He was the sport's 32nd yokozuna. He won a total of nine top division yūshō or tournament championships from 1929 to 1936, and was the dominant wrestler in sumo until the emergence of Futabayama. He died whilst still an active wrestler.

== Career ==
He was born Nishinouchi Yasuki (西ノ内 彌寿喜). He joined Nishonoseki stable but the stable was very small at that time. Therefore, he often visited Dewanoumi stable and was trained by yokozuna Tochigiyama Moriya. He later became head coach of Nishonoseki stable whilst still active in the ring, and under his leadership the stable enjoyed one of its most successful periods in its history.

Tamanishiki was promoted to the rank of ōzeki in May 1930. At the time, he was the first wrestler from Kōchi Prefecture to be promoted to ōzeki since Kunimiyama, 25 years earlier. From October 1930 to March 1931, he won three consecutive championships but was not promoted to yokozuna. In January 1932, the "Shunjuen Incident" (春秋園事件, Shunjuen-Jiken) broke out. The incident was the biggest walkout in sumo history, but Tamanishiki was one of the eleven top division wrestlers who remained in the Sumo Association. After the incident, he became the first head of the Rikishi-kai (力士会), or the association of active sumo wrestlers. He won his fifth top division championship in May 1932 and was finally awarded a yokozuna licence in November 1932. He was the first yokozuna in sumo since the retirement of Miyagiyama a year and a half earlier. His promotion was seen as a reward for staying with the Sumo Association and helping them through the Shunjuen Incident.

Tamanishiki often went to Tatsunami stable and trained wrestlers, such as later yokozuna Futabayama Sadaji. Tatsunami stable was small at that time, but the stable became stronger in the sumo world later on. Tamanishiki defeated Futabayama the first six times they met in competition, but he was never able to beat him again after Futabayama began his record winning run in 1936.

Tamanishiki was the first yokozuna to raise one leg high while performing yokozuna dohyō-iri (the yokozuna ring-entering ceremony). His style was said to have been beautiful and when Futabayama was promoted to yokozuna he emulated this style. This style is very popular now in yokozuna ceremonies.

In 1938, Tamanishiki died while an active sumo wrestler, following a delayed appendectomy.

== Career Record ==
- In 1927 Tokyo and Osaka sumo merged and four tournaments a year in Tokyo and other locations began to be held.

Tamanishiki
-	Spring	Summer
1919	(Maezumo)	(Maezumo)
1920	(Maezumo)	West Jonokuchi #14; 4–1
1921	West Jonidan #16; 3–2	West Sandanme #54; 2–3
1922	West Jonidan #1; 2–3	West Sandanme #43; 3–1; 1h
1923	East Sandanme #13; 7–3	West Makushita #30; 3–3
1924	East Makushita #24; 4–1	West Makushita #3; 4–2
1925	East Jūryō #11; 5–1	East Jūryō #2; 5–2
1926	West Maegashira #13; 8–3	East Maegashira #6; 5–6
Record given as wins–losses–absences Top division champion Top division runner-up Retired Lower divisions Non-participation Sanshō key: F=Fighting spirit; O=Outstanding performance; T=Technique Also shown: ★=Kinboshi; P=Playoff(s); Divisions: Makuuchi — Jūryō — Makushita — Sandanme — Jonidan — Jonokuchi Makuuchi ranks: Yokozuna — Ōzeki — Sekiwake — Komusubi — Maegashira

-	Spring Haru basho, Tokyo	March Sangatsu basho, varied	Summer Natsu basho, Tokyo	October Jūgatsu basho, varied
1927	West Maegashira #3; 6–5	West Maegashira #3; 6–4–1	West Maegashira #1; 6–4–1	East Maegashira #1; 6–4; 1d
1928	East Komusubi; 8–3	West Komusubi; 6–4; 1d	West Sekiwake; 9–2	West Sekiwake; 6–5
1929	East Sekiwake; 10–1	East Sekiwake; 9–2	East Sekiwake; 9–2	East Sekiwake; 7–4
1930	East Sekiwake; 9–2	East Sekiwake; 8–3	West Ōzeki; 9–2	West Ōzeki; 9–2
1931	East Ōzeki; 9–2	East Ōzeki; 10–1	West Ōzeki; 8–3	West Ōzeki; 9–2
1932	East Ōzeki; 7–1	East Ōzeki; 8–2	East Ōzeki; 10–1	East Ōzeki; 7–4
Record given as wins–losses–absences Top division champion Top division runner-up Retired Lower divisions Non-participation Sanshō key: F=Fighting spirit; O=Outstanding performance; T=Technique Also shown: ★=Kinboshi; P=Playoff(s); Divisions: Makuuchi — Jūryō — Makushita — Sandanme — Jonidan — Jonokuchi Makuuchi ranks: Yokozuna — Ōzeki — Sekiwake — Komusubi — Maegashira

-	Spring Haru basho, Tokyo	Summer Natsu basho, Tokyo	Autumn Aki basho, Tokyo
1933	East Yokozuna; 9–1; 1d	East Yokozuna; 10–1	Not held
1934	Sat out due to injury	East Yokozuna; 9–2	Not held
1935	East Yokozuna; 10–1	East Yokozuna; 10–1	Not held
1936	East Yokozuna; 11–0	East Yokozuna; 10–1	Not held
1937	East Yokozuna; 6–1–4	East Yokozuna; 9–4	Not held
1938	West Yokozuna; 10–3	West Yokozuna; 10–3	Retired –
Record given as win-loss-absent Top Division Champion Top Division Runner-up Retired Lower Divisions Key:d=Draw(s) (引分); h=Hold(s) (預り); Divisions: Makuuchi — Jūryō — Makushita — Sandanme — Jonidan — Jonokuchi Makuuchi ranks: Yokozuna — Ōzeki — Sekiwake — Komusubi — Maegashira

== See also ==
- Glossary of sumo terms
- List of past sumo wrestlers
- List of sumo tournament top division champions
- List of yokozuna

Preceded by Tsunenohana Kan'ichi	32nd Yokozuna; 1932–1938	Succeeded by Musashiyama Takeshi
Yokozuna is not a successive rank, and more than one wrestler can hold the title at once
