= Minanogawa Tōzō =

Japanese sumo wrestler

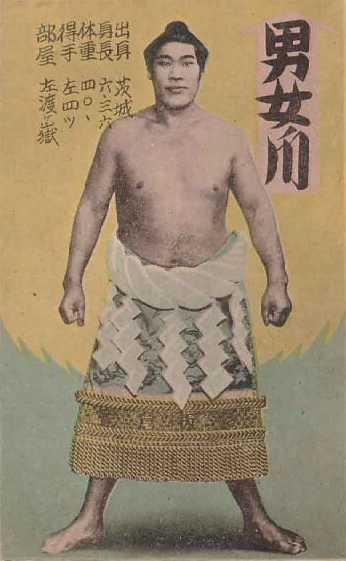

Personal information
- Native name: 男女ノ川 登三
- Born: Sakata Tomojiro; September 17, 1903 Ibaraki, Japan
- Died: January 20, 1971 (aged 67)
- Height: 1.91 m (6 ft 3 in)
- Weight: 146 kg (322 lb)

Sport
- Sport: Sumo
- Retired: January 1942
- Heya: Takasago, Sadogatake
- Record: 294-155-34-1draw
- Debut: January 1924
- Highest rank: Yokozuna (January 1936)
- Elder name: Minanogawa
- Championships: 2 (Makuuchi); 1 (Sandanme)
- Gold Stars: 2 (Tsunenohana, Tamanishiki)
- Updated on June 2020

Minanogawa Tōzō (Japanese: 男女ノ川 登三; September 17, 1903 – January 20, 1971), also known as Asashio Kyojiro (朝潮 供次郎), was a Japanese professional sumo wrestler from Tsukuba, Ibaraki. He was the sport's 34th yokozuna.

== Career ==
He was born Sakata Tomojiro (坂田 供次郎). He had lost his father in the Russo-Japanese War at the age of two, and worked as a labourer to support his mother. Already 1.82 m (5 ft 11 1/2 in) tall at the age of 15, very large for Japanese youths in his time, he was spotted by Takasago stable's Akutsugawa. He made his debut in January 1924 and reached the second highest jūryō division after only six tournaments in January 1927. He initially relied on pushing techniques, or oshi-sumo, but began to develop a more rounded technique after being given instruction by former sekiwake Kiyosegawa.

He was promoted to the top makuuchi division in January 1928. In 1929 Akutsugawa, the wrestler who had discovered him, retired and encouraged him to join his newly established Sadogatake stable. However Takasago's stablemaster, the former ōzeki Asashio Tarō II, did not want his promising rikishi to leave and even changed Minanogawa's shikona to his own of Asashio to obligate him to stay. Eventually a compromise was worked out and Minanogawa divided his time between the two stables.

He made komusubi in January 1930, and had two consecutive runner-up scores in October 1930 and January 1931, the second from the third highest sekiwake rank. Along with the lean and handsome Musashiyama he was one of the most popular men in sumo in this time. However, in 1931 he suffered a series of knee injuries, and in 1932 was caught up in the Shunjuen Incident, when a number of top division wrestlers went on an unprecedented strike. Minanogawa was out of the Japan Sumo Association for four tournaments and he and his followers held a number of their own rival tournaments with knockout rounds.

He returned to the Sumo Association in 1933 and immediately took his first tournament championship with an unbeaten record, defeating Musashiyama, Shimizugawa and yokozuna Tamanishiki, all of whom had stayed with the Association during the strike. He reverted to the Minanogawa ring name and won his second championship in January 1934. This earned him promotion to ōzeki. He was promoted to yokozuna after a 9–2 runner-up score in January 1936, just one tournament after Musashiyama, and it was suggested that the double promotion was as a result of a deal between the Takasago and Dewanoumi factions.

Although his record at yokozuna rank was not as bad as Musashiyama, who managed only one kachi-koshi winning score as a grand champion, Minanogawa was unable to win any further championships, and was overshadowed by Tamanishiki and the dominant Futabayama. He was never able to beat Futabayama as a yokozuna and had only one win over Tamanishiki. In May 1938 he could win only six out of 13 bouts, and became one of the very few yokozuna to compete in a full tournament and turn in a make-koshi losing score. By the start of 1941 he was 37 years old and suffering from injuries, and he wanted to retire, but was asked to stay on until Maedayama or Akinoumi were ready to replace him. He eventually retired in January 1942, a tournament in which Akinoumi produced a strong 13–2 record.

== Retirement from sumo ==
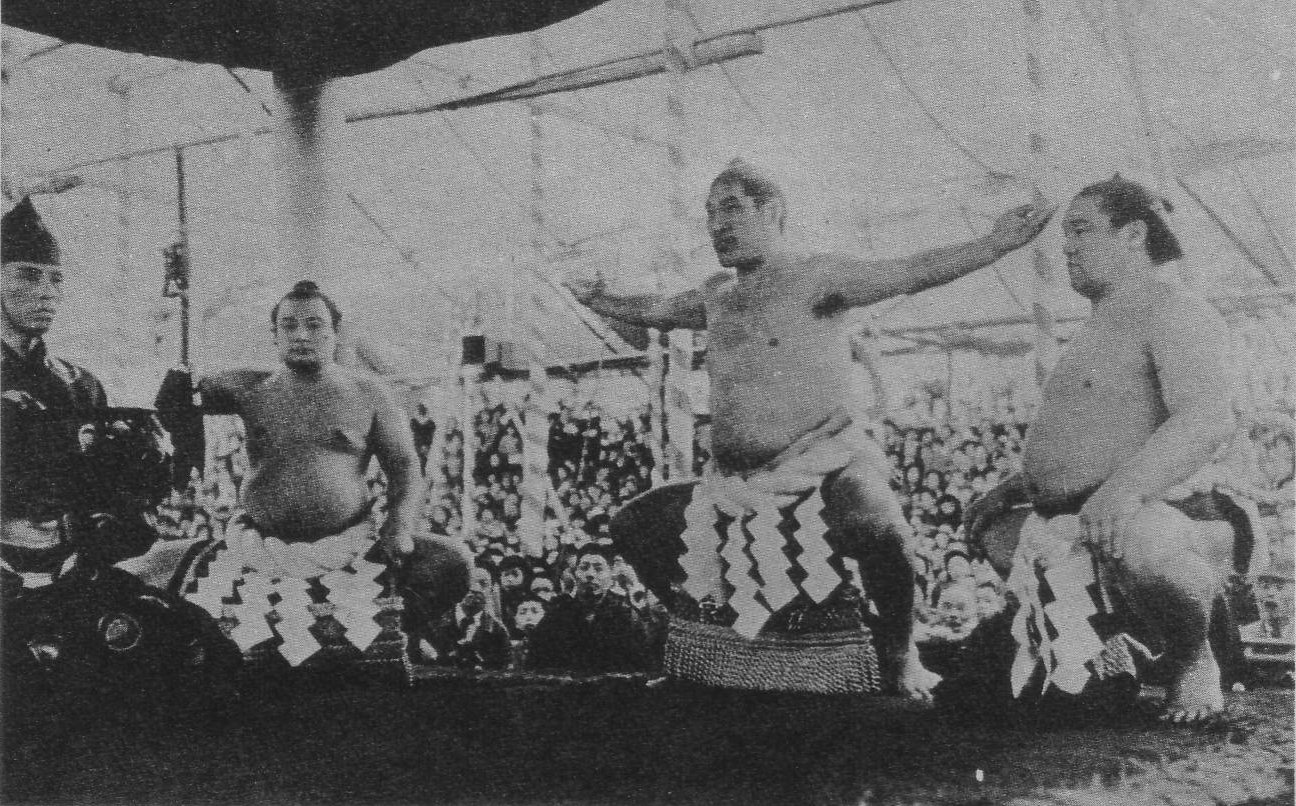
Minanogawa (second from right) during his retirement ceremony at Yasukuni Shrine, May 2, 1942

Minanogawa had been able to stay in sumo as an elder due to his yokozuna ranking, but he had lost interest in sumo. He had recently married and started a family, and had also done a law and economics degree at Waseda University. He decided to resign from the Sumo Association (an irreversible decision) and run for election to parliament. However he lost badly and used up most of his severance pay from the Sumo Association. He also lost money through gambling. He tried a succession of unsuccessful jobs and even had a bit part in a 1958 Hollywood film called The Barbarian and the Geisha. He was eventually divorced from his wife and separated from his children, and in his later years was confined to a rest home and reliant on hand outs from fans and sumo officials. He died in 1971, largely forgotten by the general public.

== Career record ==
- In 1927 Tokyo and Osaka sumo merged and four tournaments a year in Tokyo and other locations began to be held.

Minanogawa Tōzō
-	Spring Haru basho, varied	Summer Natsu basho, varied
1924	(Maezumo)	Jonokuchi #16; 4–2
1925	Jonidan #30; 5–1	Sandanme #48; 5–1
1926	West Sandanme #12; 6–0; Champion	Makushita #10; 4–2
Record given as wins–losses–absences Top division champion Top division runner-up Retired Lower divisions Non-participation Sanshō key: F=Fighting spirit; O=Outstanding performance; T=Technique Also shown: ★=Kinboshi; P=Playoff(s); Divisions: Makuuchi — Jūryō — Makushita — Sandanme — Jonidan — Jonokuchi Makuuchi ranks: Yokozuna — Ōzeki — Sekiwake — Komusubi — Maegashira

-	Spring Haru basho, Tokyo	March Sangatsu basho, varied	Summer Natsu basho, Tokyo	October Jūgatsu basho, varied
1927	East Jūryō #8; 5–1	East Jūryō #8; 4–5	East Jūryō #1; 5–5–1	East Jūryō #6; 9–2
1928	West Maegashira #14; 6–5	East Maegashira #13; 8–3	East Maegashira #10; 7–4	East Maegashira #10; 5–6
1929	West Maegashira #4; 5–5; 1d	West Maegashira #4; 9–2	West Maegashira #2; 6–5	West Maegashira #2; 8–3
1930	West Komusubi #1; 8–3	West Komusubi #1; 6–5	West Maegashira #1; 6–5 ★	West Maegashira #1; 9–2
1931	East Sekiwake #1; 9–2	East Sekiwake #1; 8–3	West Sekiwake #1; 0–0–11	West Sekiwake #1; 1–10
1932	East Maegashira #3 –	Seceded	Seceded	Seceded
Record given as wins–losses–absences Top division champion Top division runner-up Retired Lower divisions Non-participation Sanshō key: F=Fighting spirit; O=Outstanding performance; T=Technique Also shown: ★=Kinboshi; P=Playoff(s); Divisions: Makuuchi — Jūryō — Makushita — Sandanme — Jonidan — Jonokuchi Makuuchi ranks: Yokozuna — Ōzeki — Sekiwake — Komusubi — Maegashira

-	Spring Haru basho, Tokyo	Summer Natsu basho, Tokyo	Autumn Aki basho, Tokyo
1933	Maegashira; 11–0 ★	West Komusubi #1; 8–3	Not held
1934	West Sekiwake #1; 9–2	West Ōzeki #2; 5–6	Not held
1935	West Ōzeki #2; 9–2	West Ōzeki #1; 8–3	Not held
1936	East Ōzeki #1; 9–2	East Yokozuna-Ōzeki #2; 6–5	Not held
1937	West Yokozuna #1; 7–4	West Yokozuna #1; 0–0–13	Not held
1938	West Yokozuna-Ōzeki #2; 7–6	East Yokozuna #2; 6–7	Not held
1939	East Yokozuna #2; 11–2	West Yokozuna #1; 9–6	Not held
1940	West Yokozuna #1; 10–5	West Yokozuna #1; 10–5	Not held
1941	East Yokozuna #1; 10–5	East Yokozuna #1; 2–4–9	Not held
1942	West Yokozuna #1; Retired; 9–6	x	x
Record given as win-loss-absent Top Division Champion Top Division Runner-up Retired Lower Divisions Key: ★=Kinboshi(s); d=Draw(s) (引分); h=Hold(s) (預り); Divisions: Makuuchi — Jūryō — Makushita — Sandanme — Jonidan — Jonokuchi Makuuchi ranks: Yokozuna — Ōzeki — Sekiwake — Komusubi — Maegashira

- Minanogawa, along with many others, was expelled from the Sumo Association for striking. He was allowed to return to the top division for the 1933 Spring tournament but unranked. He still managed to take the championship.

== See also ==
- Glossary of sumo terms
- List of past sumo wrestlers
- List of sumo tournament top division champions
- List of yokozuna

Preceded by Musashiyama Takeshi	34th Yokozuna; 1936–1942	Succeeded by Futabayama Sadaji
Yokozuna is not a successive rank, and more than one wrestler can hold the title at once
