= Futabayama Sadaji =

Japanese sumo wrestler

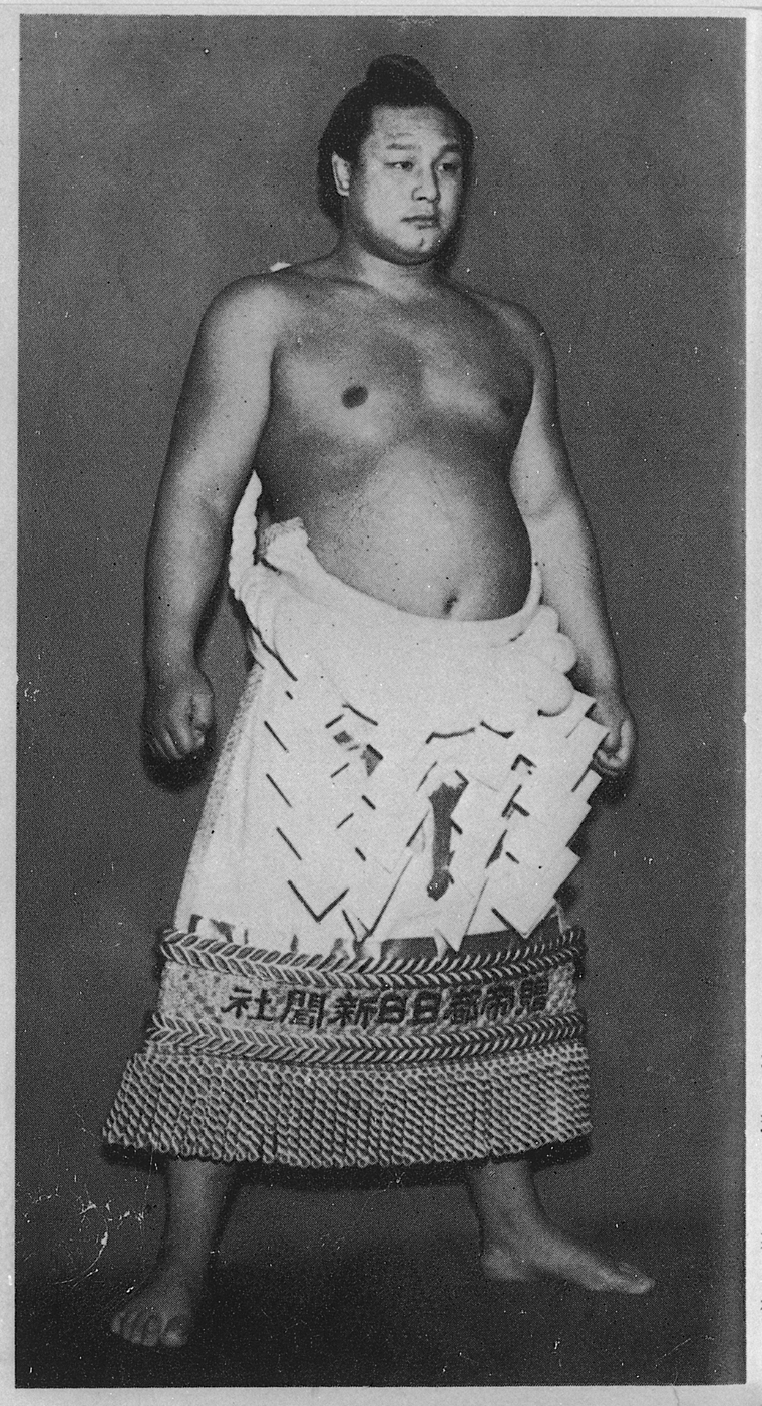
- Futabayama, c. 1939

Personal information
- Native name: 双葉山 定次
- Born: Akiyoshi Sadaji; February 9, 1912 Usa, Oita, Japan
- Died: December 16, 1968 (aged 56)
- Height: 1.79 m (5 ft 10 in)
- Weight: 128 kg (282 lb; 20.2 st)

Sport
- Sport: Sumo
- Retired: November 1945
- Heya: Tatsunami
- Record: 345-113-33 (1 draw)
- Debut: March 1927
- Highest rank: Yokozuna (May 1937)
- Elder name: Tokitsukaze
- Championships: 12 (Makuuchi)
- Gold Stars: 1 (Musashiyama)
- Updated on June 2020

Futabayama Sadaji (双葉山 定次; February 9, 1912 – December 16, 1968) was a Japanese professional sumo wrestler from Oita Prefecture. Entering sumo in 1927, he was the sport's 35th yokozuna from 1937 until his retirement in 1945. He won twelve yūshō or top division championships and had a winning streak of 69 consecutive bouts, an all-time record. because of his dominance he was extremely popular with the public. After his retirement he was head coach of Tokitsukaze stable and chairman of the Japan Sumo Association.

== Career ==
Born Akiyoshi Sadaji (龝吉 定次) in Usa, he worked on fishing boats as young boy. He joined professional sumo in March 1927 at the age of 15, recruited by Tatsunami stable. He entered the top makuuchi division at the beginning of 1932. He was promoted from the middle of the second jūryō division to maegashira 4, as many top division wrestlers had just gone on strike in the Shunjuen Incident, and the Japan Sumo Association needed to fill the gaps in the ranks. However, he soon proved himself worthy of the promotion, finishing as runner-up in his second top division tournament.

Futabayama is particularly remembered for achieving the longest run of consecutive victories in sumo bouts, with 69, a record that still stands today. This represents an unbeaten run which stretched over three years. In a sport where matches often last a few seconds, and a brief lapse in concentration can lead to a loss, this is an exceptional achievement. It began on January 16, 1936 at the rank of maegashira 3. During this run he was promoted from maegashira 3 to yokozuna. It generated such excitement among the public that the Sumo Association extended the number of days per tournament from 11 to 13, and then to 15. He was finally defeated on January 3, 1939 by maegashira Akinoumi (later a yokozuna himself). He lost more to illness than to a superior opponent, as he was suffering from amoebic dysentery at the time.

Futabayama won a total of twelve tournament championships, during a period in which there were only two tournaments held each year. His total remained a record until the number of tournaments was increased to six a year in the 1950s. However, the percentage of championships won in his makuuchi career still compares favorably to the wrestlers who have surpassed his total in the six tournament a year era.

After his retirement Futabayama revealed he was actually blind in one eye, due to an injury suffered in his youth, making his achievements even more remarkable.

He was one of the first top wrestlers to break away from the tradition of marrying his stablemaster's daughter, instead choosing a young heiress from a rich Kansai family. Their reception was held in April 1939 at the Tokyo Kaikan. (His coach's daughter married Haguroyama instead.)

== Fighting style ==
Futabayama was noted for being exceptionally good at the initial phase of a sumo match, the tachi-ai. He was an expert at the gonosen no tachiai or receiving his opponent's charge and immediately countering it. He is believed to have never made a false start. Although he was not particularly large, he had excellent balance. One of his most feared techniques was uwatenage, or overarm throw.

== Retirement from sumo ==
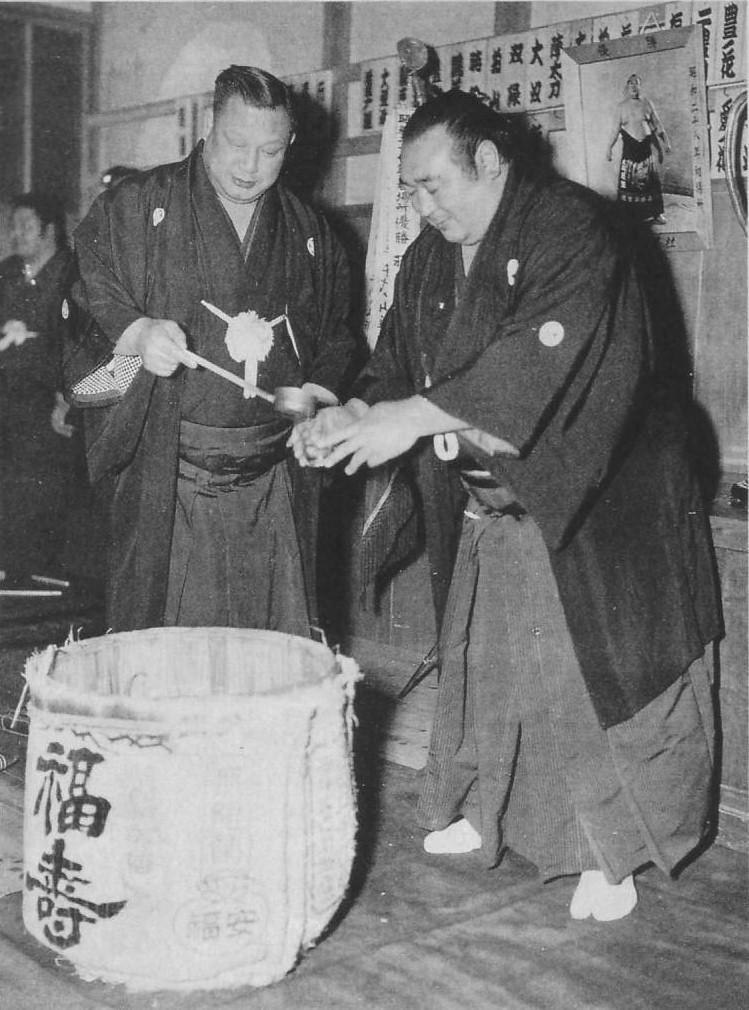
Futabayama (left) celebrates his wrestler Kagamisato's victory in the January 1953 tournament that saw him promoted to yokozuna

The June 1945 tournament was held in a bomb-damaged Kokugikan with barely any spectators, and Futabayama dropped out after the first day. He did not take part in the November 1945 tournament and announced his retirement during it, claiming that he objected to the newly enlarged dohyō that the Sumo Association had introduced with hopes to make the sport more pleasing to the occupying forces. However, he had actually made a decision to retire a year earlier, having suffered a loss to Azumafuji, another future yokozuna.

Futabayama had become head of his own stable, Futabayama Dojo, in 1941 whilst still an active wrestler (a practice now forbidden), and upon his retirement he adopted the Tokitsukaze elder name and renamed his heya Tokitsukaze stable. It grew to become one of sumo's largest stables by the 1950s, and Futabayama produced several strong wrestlers including yokozuna Kagamisato and ōzeki Kitabayama and Yutakayama. He remained in charge of the stable until his death from hepatitis in 1968. From 1957 he was also chairman (rijichō) of the Japan Sumo Association. In his time as chairman he introduced a number of important reforms, such as giving monthly salaries to wrestlers ranked in the top two divisions, and enforcing a mandatory retirement age of 65 for elders and referees.

== Career record ==
- Four tournaments a year, in Tokyo and other locations, were held from 1927–1932. For most of the 1930s and 1940s only two tournaments were held a year in Tokyo only.

Futabayama Sadaji
-	Spring Haru basho, Tokyo	March Sangatsu basho, varied	Summer Natsu basho, Tokyo	October Jūgatsu basho, varied
1927	x	(Maezumo)	Shinjo; 3–3	East Jonokuchi #27; 4–2
1928	East Jonokuchi #9; 5–1	West Jonidan #34; 3–3	East Jonidan #16; 3–3	East Jonidan #16; 4–2
1929	East Sandanme #33; 3–3	East Sandanme #33; 5–1	West Sandanme #7; 4–2	West Sandanme #7; 3–3
1930	West Makushita #24; 4–2	West Makushita #24; 3–3	East Makushita #4; 4–2	East Makushita #4; 3–3
1931	West Makushita #3; 6–1	West Makushita #3; 5–2	West Jūryō #5; 3–8	West Jūryō #5; 7–4
1932	West Maegashira #4; 5–3	West Maegashira #4; 8–2	East Maegashira #2; 6–5	Sat out due to injury
Record given as wins–losses–absences Top division champion Top division runner-up Retired Lower divisions Non-participation Sanshō key: F=Fighting spirit; O=Outstanding performance; T=Technique Also shown: ★=Kinboshi; P=Playoff(s); Divisions: Makuuchi — Jūryō — Makushita — Sandanme — Jonidan — Jonokuchi Makuuchi ranks: Yokozuna — Ōzeki — Sekiwake — Komusubi — Maegashira

-	Spring Haru basho, Tokyo	Summer Natsu basho, Tokyo	Autumn Aki basho, Tokyo
1933	East Maegashira #5; 9–2	East Maegashira #2; 4–7	Not held
1934	West Maegashira #4; 6–5	West Maegashira #1; 6–5	Not held
1935	East Komusubi; 4–6; 1d	East Maegashira #1; 4–7	Not held
1936	East Maegashira #3; 9–2 ★	West Sekiwake; 11–0	Not held
1937	East Ōzeki; 11–0	East Ōzeki; 13–0	Not held
1938	West Yokozuna; 13–0	East Yokozuna; 13–0	Not held
1939	East Yokozuna; 9–4	East Yokozuna; 15–0	Not held
1940	East Yokozuna; 14–1	East Yokozuna; 7–5–3	Not held
1941	West Yokozuna; 14–1	West Yokozuna; 13–2	Not held
1942	East Yokozuna; 14–1	East Yokozuna; 13–2	Not held
1943	West Yokozuna; 15–0	East Yokozuna; 15–0	Not held
1944	East Yokozuna; 11–4	East Yokozuna; 9–1	East Yokozuna; 4–3–3
1945	Not held	West Yokozuna; 1–0–6	West Yokozuna; Retired; 0–0–10
Record given as win-loss-absent Top Division Champion Top Division Runner-up Retired Lower Divisions Key: ★=Kinboshi(s); d=Draw(s) (引分); h=Hold(s) (預り); Divisions: Makuuchi — Jūryō — Makushita — Sandanme — Jonidan — Jonokuchi Makuuchi ranks: Yokozuna — Ōzeki — Sekiwake — Komusubi — Maegashira

== See also ==
- List of sumo record holders
- List of sumo tournament top division champions
- List of yokozuna
- Glossary of sumo terms
- List of past sumo wrestlers

Preceded by Minanogawa Tōzō	35th Yokozuna; 1937–1945	Succeeded by Haguroyama Masaji
Yokozuna is not a successive rank, and more than one wrestler can hold the title at once

Sporting positions
Preceded by Tsunenohana Kan'ichi	Chairman of the Japan Sumo Association; 1957–1968	Succeeded by Dewanohana Kuniichi
