= Wakasugiyama =

Wakasugiyama may refer to:

- Mount Wakasugi, mountain in Tottori Prefecture
- Wakasugiyama (Fukuoka), mountain in Fukuoka Prefecture
- Wakasugiyama Toyoichi, Japanese sumo wrestler
