= List of sumo tournament top division runners-up =

This is a list of all professional sumo wrestlers who have finished runner-up for the championship for the top division makuuchi at a Japanese grand sumo tournament since 1909, when the current championship system was established.

== Top division runners-up 1958 to present ==
The table lists all makuuchi runners-up (jun-yūshō) since 1958, the advent of the bimonthly tournament schedule. The runner-up is determined by the wrestler(s) with the second highest win–loss score after fifteen bouts, held at a rate of one per day over the duration of the 15-day tournament. In the event of a tie for first place, a play-off is held between the wrestlers concerned.

Below a wrestler's ring name (shikona) their rank and win–loss score that tournament are given. –P indicates an additional bout fought in a yūshō playoff. Number of jun-yūshō are given in parentheses. (x) marks a singular career runner-up. ^{†} marks a shikona before a name change. ^{‡} marks a shikona after a name change. Names in italics mark a jun-yūshō by a maegashira, a wrestler ranked outside of the privileged san'yaku ranks.

	January	March	May	July	September	November
year in sumo	Tokyo	Osaka	Tokyo	Nagoya	Tokyo	Kyushu
2027	(10–24 Jan)	(14–28 Mar)	(9–23 May)	(11–25 Jul)	(12–26 Sep)	(14–28 Nov)
2026	Atamifuji; M4w 12–3–P (4)	Hōshōryū; Ye 11–4 (6) Kotoshoho; M5w 11-4 (2)	Kirishima II^{‡} O2e 12–3–P (3)	Kirishima II^{‡} Oe 12–3–PP (4) Atamifuji; S1e 12–3–PP (5)	Aonishiki; O2e 11–4 (2) Fujinokawa; Sw 11–4 (x)	Wakamotoharu; M7e 13–2–P (x)
2025	Oho; M3w 12–3–P (x) Kinbozan; M14w 12–3–P (x)	Takayasu; M5w 12–3–P (9)	Hōshōryū; Ye 12–3 (3) Wakatakakage; Kw 12–3 (3)	Ōnosato; Yw 11–4 (2) Aonishiki; M1e 11–4 (1) Tamawashi; M4w 11–4 (2) Atamifuji; M10e 11–4 (3) Kusano^{†} M14e 11–4 (x)	Hōshōryū; Yw 13–2–P (4)	Hōshōryū; Yw 12–3–P (5)
2024	Kotonowaka^{†} Se 13–2–P (2)	Hōshōryū; O1w 11–4 (1) Ōnosato; M5w 11–4 (1) Takayasu; M8w 11–4 (8)	Kotozakura^{‡} O1w 11–4 (3) Daieisho; M1w 11–4 (3)	Takanoshō; M6e 12–3–P (3)	Kirishima^{‡} S2e 12–3 (2) Wakatakakage; M7e 12–3 (2)	Hōshōryū; O1w 13–2 (2)
2023	Kiribayama^{†} K1e 11–4 (1) Kotoshōhō; M13e 11–4 (1)	Daieisho; K2e 12–3–P (2)	Asanoyama; M14e 12–3 (4)	Hokutōfuji; M9w 12–3–P (2)	Atamifuji; M15e 11–4–P (1)	Kotonowaka^{†} S2e 11–4 (1) Atamifuji; M8w 11–4 (2) Ichiyamamoto; M14w 11–4 (x)
2022	Abi; M6w 12–3 (2)	Takayasu; M7e 12–3–P (5)	Daieisho; Kw 11–4 (1) Takanoshō; M4w 11–4 (2) Sadanoumi; M12w 11–4 (x)	Terunofuji; Y 11–4 (8) Takakeishō; O1e 11–4 (7)	Wakatakakage; S1e 11–4 (1) Takayasu; M4w 11–4 (6) Ryūden; M12w 11–4 (x)	Takakeishō; Oe 12–3–P (8) Takayasu; M1e 12–3–P (7)
2021	Shodai (Note: Due to the COVID-19 pandemic in Japan, the tournament was held in Tokyo to avoid unnecessary domestic travel.); O1w 11–4 (3) Asanoyama; O2e 11–4 (3) Terunofuji; Se 11–4 (6)	Aoiyama; M12w 11–4 (2)	Takakeishō; O1w 12–3–P (5)	Terunofuji; O1e 14–1 (7)	Myogiryu; M10w 11–4 (x) Endo; M11e 11–4 (2)	Takakeishō; Ow 12–3 (6) Abi; M15w 12–3 (1)
2020	Shodai; M4w 13–2 (2)	Kakuryū; Yw 12–3 (8) Takanoshō; M9e 12–3 (1)	Not held (COVID-19)	Asanoyama; Ow 12–3 (2)	Takakeishō; Ow 12–3 (4)	Terunofuji; Ke 13–2–P (5)
2019	Takakeishō; Se 11–4 (2)	Ichinojō; M4w 14–1 (2)	Kakuryū; Yw 11–4 (7)	Hakuhō; Yw 12–3 (22) Terutsuyoshi; M16w 12–3 (x)	Takakeishō; Sw 12–3–P (3)	Asanoyama; K2w 11–4 (1) Shodai; M10w 11–4 (1)
2018	Takayasu; Ow 12–3 (2)	Takayasu; Ow 12–3 (3) Kaisei; M6e 12–3 (2)	Tochinoshin; Se 13–2 (4)	Yutakayama; M9w 12–3 (x)	Gōeidō; O1e 12–3 (7)	Takayasu; O1w 11–4 (4)
2017	Sōkokurai; M10w 12–3 (x)	Terunofuji; Ow 13–2–P (3)	Terunofuji; Oe 12–3 (4) Tochinoshin; M10e 12–3 (3)	Aoiyama; M8e 13–2 (1)	Gōeidō; O1w 11–4–P (6)	Tamawashi; M1e 11–4 (1) Takakeishō; M1w 11–4 (1) Hokutōfuji; M3w 11–4 (1) Okinoumi; M12e 11–4 (3)
2016	Harumafuji^{‡} Y1e 12–3 (7) Hakuhō; Y1w 12–3 (21) Toyonoshima; M7e 12–3 (5)	Kisenosato; O1w 13–2 (9)	Kisenosato; O1e 13–2 (10)	Kisenosato; O1e 12–3 (11) Takanoiwa; M10e 12–3 (x)	Endō; M14e 13–2 (1)	Kisenosato; O1w 12–3 (12)
2015	Harumafuji^{‡} Y2e 11–4 (5) Kisenosato; O1e 11–4 (7) Tokushōryū; M16e 11–4	Terunofuji; Se 13–2 (1)	Hakuhō; Y1e 11–4 (19) Harumafuji^{‡} Y1w 11–4 (6) Kisenosato; O1e 11–4 (8)	Kakuryū; Y2e 12–3 (6) Yoshikaze; M8e 12–3 (x)	Terunofuji; O1e 12–3–P (2)	Hakuhō Y1w 12–3 (20) Ikioi M4e 12–3 (x) Shōhōzan M10w 12–3 (x)
2014	Kakuryū; O1w 14–1–P (4)	Hakuhō; Y1e 12–3 (18) Harumafuji^{‡} Y1w 12–3 (4) Gōeidō; S1e 12–3 (4)	Kisenosato; Oe 13–2 (6)	Kotoshōgiku; Ow 12–3 (3) Gōeidō; Se 12–3 (5)	Ichinojō; M10e 13–2 (1)	Kakuryū; Y1w 12–3 (5)
2013	Hakuhō; Ye 12–3 (16) Takayasu; M7e 12–3 (1)	Okinoumi; M7e 12–3 (2) Takarafuji; M10e 12–3 (x)	Kisenosato; O1e 13–2 (2)	Kisenosato; O1e 11–4 (3) Kaisei; M12e 11–4 (1)	Kisenosato; O1e 11–4 (4) Gōeidō; Sw 11–4 (3)	Hakuhō; Ye 13–2 (17) Kisenosato; O1e 13–2 (5)
2012	Hakuhō; Y 12–3 (13) Gagamaru; M10w 12–3 (1)	Kakuryū; Se 13–2–P (3)	Tochiōzan; M4e 12–3–P (x)	Hakuhō; Ye 14–1 (14)	Hakuhō; Ye 13–2 (15)	Gōeidō; Sw 11–4 (2) Toyonoshima; M6w 11–4 (4)
2011	Kotoshōgiku; Sw 11–4 (1) Gōeidō; M5e 11–4 (1) Okinoumi; M13e 11–4 (1)	Not held (match-fixing)	Kakuryū; Ke 12–3 (2) Tochinoshin; M6w 12–3 (2)	Hakuhō; Y 12–3 (12)	Kotoshōgiku; S1e 12–3 (2) Kisenosato; S1w 12–3 (1)	Wakakōyū; M9w 12–3 (x)
2010	Hakuhō; Ye 12–3 (11) Baruto; Se 12–3 (3)	Baruto; Se 14–1 (4)	Aran; M10e 12–3 (1)	Aran; M2e 11–4 (2) Kakuryū; M6e 12–3 (1) Hōmashō; M13e 12–3 (3)	Takekaze; M12w 12–3 (x)	Toyonoshima; M9w 14–1–P (3)
2009	Hakuhō; Ye 14–1–P (8)	Asashōryū; Ye 11–4 (8) Hōmashō; M7e 11–4 (2)	Hakuhō; Ye 14–1–P (9)	Kotoōshū; O1w 13–2 (4)	Hakuhō; Ye 14–1–P (10)	Tochinoshin; M8w 12–3 (1) Miyabiyama; M9w 12–3 (4)
2008	Asashōryū; Yw 13–2 (6)	Hakuhō; Ye 12–3 (6) Kokkai; M5w 12–3 (x) Baruto; M7e 12–3 (2)	Asashōryū; Ye 11–4 (7) Hakuhō; Yw 11–4 (7) Toyonoshima; M5w 11–4 (2)	Kotomitsuki; O1w 11–4 (8)	Ama^{†} Se 11–4 (2)	Ama^{†} Se 13–2–P (3)
2007	Toyonoshima; M9w 12–3 (1)	Asashōryū; Y 13–2–P (5)	Kotomitsuki; Se 12–3 (6) Asasekiryū; M8w 12–3 (2) Dejima; M10e 12–3 (2)	Kotomitsuki; Se 13–2 (7)	Kyokutenhō; M12w 12–3 (x)	Chiyotaikai; O1w 11–4 (7) Baruto; M16e 11–4 (1)
2006	Hakuhō; Sw 13–2 (3)	Hakuhō; Se 13–2–P (4)	Miyabiyama; Sw 14–1–P (3)	Hakuhō; O1e 13–2 (5)	Aminishiki; M3w 11–4 (2) Ama^{†} M6e 11–4 (1)	Hōmashō; M11e 12–3 (1)
2005	Tochiazuma; S2w 11–4 (5) Hakuhō; Kw 11–4 (2)	Tamanoshima; M7w 12–3 (2)	Kotomitsuki; Ke 13–2 (5)	Kotoōshū; Ke 12–3 (1)	Kotoōshū; Se 13–2–P (2)	Chiyotaikai; O1w 11–4 (6) Kotoōshū; Se 11–4 (3) Tochinohana; M14e 11–4 (x)
2004	Kotomitsuki; M4w 13–2 (4)	Chiyotaikai; O1e 13–2 (5) Kaiō; O1w 13–2 (10) Asasekiryū; M12w 13–2 (1)	Hokutōriki; M1w 13–2–P (3)	Miyabiyama; M7e 12–3 (2) Toyozakura; M12e 12–3 (x)	Tochinonada; M3w 11–4 (2) Kyokushūzan; M10w 11–4 (2)	Kaiō; O1e 12–3 (11) Hakuhō; M1w 12–3 (1)
2003	Wakanosato; Kw 11–4 (1) Dejima; M3w 11–4 (1) Tochinonada; M10e 11–4 (1)	Asashōryū; Yw 10–5 (3) Kaiō; O2w 10–5 (8) Kyokushūzan; M7w 10–5 (1) Hokutōriki; M11e 10–5 (2)	Kaiō; O1w 11–4 (9) Aminishiki; M7w 11–4 (1)	Chiyotaikai; O1w 11–4 (3)	Chiyotaikai; O1w 11–4 (4) Wakanosato; Se 11–4 (2) Iwakiyama; M5e 11–4 (1) Kotomitsuki; M6e 11–4 (3)	Asashōryū; Ye 12–3 (4)
2002	Chiyotaikai; O2e 13–2–P (1)	Kaiō; O2w 12–3 (5)	Kaiō; O1e 11–4 (6) Chiyotaikai; O2w 11–4 (2) Asashōryū; Se 11–4 (1) Hokutōriki; M14e 11–4 (1)	Asashōryū; Se 12–3 (2)	Takanohana II^{‡} Yw 12–3 (16) Kaiō; O2e 12–3 (7) Kotomitsuki; M7e 12–3 (2)	Takanowaka; Kw 11–4 (x)
2001	Musashimaru; Y1w 14–1–P (11)	Takanohana II^{‡} Ye 12–3 (15) Musashimaru; Yw 12–3 (12) Musōyama; O1w 12–3 (4)	Musashimaru; Yw 13–2–P (13)	Musashimaru; Yw 12–3 (14) Tamanoshima; M7w 12–3 (1)	Tochiazuma; Se 12–3 (3)	Tochiazuma; S1e 12–3 (4)
2000	Takanohana II^{‡} Y1w 12–3 (13) Miyabiyama; Kw 12–3 (1)	Akebono; Y1w 12–3 (11) Musōyama; S1e 12–3 (3)	Akebono; Y1e 13–2 (12) Takanohana II^{‡} Y1w 13–2 (14)	Tochiazuma; S1w 12–3 (2)	Akebono; Y1e 13–2 (13)	Kotomitsuki; M9w 13–2 (1)
1999	Wakanohana III^{‡} Y1w 13–2–P (9)	Takanonami; O2w 12–3 (8)	Kaiō; S1w 12–3 (3)	Akebono; Y1e 13–2–P (10)	Akinoshima; M3w 11–4 (2)	Takanohana II^{‡} Y2w 11–4 (12) Kaiō; Se 11–4 (4)
1998	Tochiazuma; Sw 11–4 (1)	Akebono; Y1e 13–2 (9)	Takanonami; O2e 11–4 (7) Kotonishiki; M2e 11–4 (4)	Musashimaru; Ow 12–3 (10)	Wakanohana III^{‡} Y2e 12–3 (8)	Takanohana II^{‡} Y1e 12–3 (11) Tosanoumi; M9e 12–3 (x)
1997	Takanohana II^{‡} Yw 13–2 (8)	Akebono; Yw 12–3–PP (7) Musashimaru; O1w 12–3–P (8) Kaiō; M1e 12–3–P (2)	Takanohana II^{‡} Ye 13–2–P (9)	Akebono; Yw 12–3 (8)	Musashimaru; O1e 12–3–P (9)	Takanohana II^{‡} Ye 14–1–P (10)
1996	Takanohana II^{‡} Ye 14–1–P (7)	Wakanohana III^{‡} 02e 12–3 (4) Musōyama; S2e 12–3 (2)	Wakanohana III^{‡} O1e 12–3 (5) Takanonami; O1w 12–3 (4)	Akebono; Yw 12–3 (5) Takanonami; O1w 12–3 (5)	Wakanohana III^{‡} O1w 11–4 (6) Musashimaru; O2e 11–4 (7) Takatōriki; Sw 11–4 (2)	Akebono; Yw 11–4–P (6) Wakanohana III^{‡} O1e 11–4–P (7) Takanonami; O2e 11–4–PP (6) Kaiō; S1w 11–4–P (1)
1995	Musashimaru; O1w 13–2–P (5)	Takanohana II^{‡} Ye 13–2 (5)	Akebono; Ye 13–2 (3)	Musashimaru; O1e 12–3 (6)	Akebono; Yw 12–3 (4)	Takanohana II^{‡} Ye 12–3–P (6)
1994	Takanonami; Sw 13–2 (1)	Takanonami; O2e 12–3–PP (2) Takatōriki; M12e 12–3–PP (1)	Musashimaru; O2e 12–3 (3)	Wakanohana III^{‡} O2w 14–1 (3)	Musōyama; Se 13–2 (1)	Takanonami (1); O2e 12–3 (3) Musashimaru; O2w 12–3 (4)
1993	Daishoyama; M14w 12–3 (x)	Takanohana II^{‡} Oe 11–4 (2)	Akebono; Y 13–2 (2)	Takanohana II^{‡} Oe 13–2–P (3) Wakanohana III^{‡} Se 13–2–P (2)	Takanohana II^{‡} O1e 12–3 (4)	Musashimaru; S2w 13–2–P (2)
1992	Akebono; Kw 13–2 (1)	Kirishima; Ow 12–3 (6) Tochinowaka; K1e 12–3 (x) Akinoshima; M2w 12–3 (1)	Wakahanada^{†} M7w 11–4 (1)	Kirishima; O2e 11–4 (7) Musashimaru; K1e 11–4 (2)	Kotonishiki; M1e 11–4 (2) Daishōhō; M8w 11–4 (x)	Kotonishiki; K1e 13–2 (3)
1991	Hokutoumi; Y2w 12–3 (8)	Ōnokuni; Y2e 12–3 (7) Takahanada^{†} M13e 12–3 (1)	Konishiki II; Oe 14–1–P (8)	Konishiki II; Oe 12–3 (9)	Kirishima; Ow 12–3 (5)	Kotonishiki; K1w 12–3 (1)
1990	Hokutoumi; Y1w 11–4 (7) Kirishima; Ke 11–4 (2)	Konishiki II; O1e 13–2–PPP (7) Kirishima; Se 13–2–PP (3)	Chiyonofuji; Y1w 13–2 (10)	Chiyonofuji; Y1e 12–3 (11)	Asahifuji; Y1w 13–2 (8) Kirishima; O2e 13–2 (4)	Asahifuji; Y1w 12–3 (9)
1989	Asahifuji; O1e 14–1–P (5)	Asahifuji; O1e 13–2 (6)	Asahifuji; O1e 13–2–P (7)	Hokutoumi; Y1e 12–3–P (5)	Hokutoumi; Y1e 11–4 (6)	Chiyonofuji; Y1e 13–2 (9)
1988	Konishiki II; O2e 13–2 (6)	Hokutoumi; Y1w 13–2–P (4)	Asahifuji; O1e 12–3 (2)	Ōnokuni; Y2e 12–3 (6)	Asahifuji; O1e 12–3 (3)	Asahifuji; O1e 12–3 (4)
1987	Futahaguro^{‡} Yw 12–3–P (6)	Chiyonofuji; Y1e 11–4 (8) Konishiki II; Se 11–4 (5)	Hokutoumi; O1e 13–2 (2)	Ōnokuni; O1e 12–3 (4)	Ōnokuni; O1e 13–2 (5)	Hokutoumi; Y1e 13–2 (3); Futahaguro^{‡} Y2w 13–2 (7)
1986	Ōnokuni; O1w 12–3 (3)	Konishiki II; Ke 12–3 (3) Mitoizumi; M12e 12–3 (2)	Kitao^{†} O1e 12–3 (3)	Kitao^{†} O1e 14–1–P (4)	Hokutoumi; O1e 12–3 (1) Konishiki II; M4e 12–3 (4)	Futahaguro^{‡} Yw 12–3 (5) Kirishima; M7e 12–3 (1)
1985	Hokuten'yū; O2w 11–4 (3) Dewanohana; M9w 11–4 (x) Mitoizumi; M10e 11–4 (1)	Wakashimazu; O1w 12–3 (6)	Konishiki II; Kw 12–3 (2)	Ōnokuni; S1e 12–3 (1) Kitao^{†} M1 12–3 (1)	Ōnokuni; O1w 12–3 (2)	Hokuten'yū; O1w 12–3 (4) Kitao^{†} Se 12–3 (2)
1984	Chiyonofuji; Y1e 12–3 (6)	Hokuten'yū; O2w 12–3 (2)	Takanosato; Y1e 11–4 (8) Chiyonofuji; Y2e 11–4 (7)	Kitanoumi; Y1e 11–4 (16)	Konishiki II; M6 12–3 (1)	Wakashimazu; O1e 11–4 (5) Asahifuji; M5 11–4 (1)
1983	Asashio IV; Sw 14–1–P (3)	Takanosato; O1w 12–3 (5) Asashio IV; Se 12–3 (4) Hokuten'yū; Sw 12–3 (1)	Takanosato; O1e 13–2 (6) Wakashimazu; O2w 13–2 (4)	Chiyonofuji; Y1e 13–2 (4)	Chiyonofuji; Y1e 14–1 (5)	Takanosato; Y1e 13–2 (7)
1982	Chiyonofuji; Y1e 12–3 (3) Takanosato; Se 12–3 (3) Wakashimazu; M2w 12–3 (1)	Kitanoumi; Y1e 11–4 (15) Wakanohana II; Y2e 11–4 (12) Takanosato; Ow 11–4 (4) Kirinji; M5e 11–4 (2)	Asashio IV; Kw 13–2–P (2)	Wakanohana II; Y1w 11–4 (13) Kotokaze; Ow 11–4 (2) Daijuyama; M8w 11–4 (x) Kōbōyama; M11e 11–4 (x)	Wakashimazu; S1e 12–3 (2)	Wakashimazu; Se 12–3 (3)
1981	Kitanoumi; Y2e 14–1–P (13)	Chiyonofuji; Oe 11–4 (1) Ōzutsu; Ke 11–4 (x)	Chiyonofuji; O 13–2 (2)	Kitanoumi; Y1e 13–2 (14)	Wakanohana II; Y2e 11–4 (11)	Asashio IV; K2w 12–3–P (1)
1980	Kitanoumi; Y2e 12–3 (12) Masuiyama II; Se 12–3 (2) Kotokaze; M14w 12–3 (1)	Wakanohana II; Y2e 12–3 (8)	Wakanohana II; Y1w 12–3 (9) Tochihikari^{‡} M10w 12–3 (2)	Takanosato; M12e 12–3 (1)	Takanosato; M1w 13–2 (2)	Wakanohana II; Y1e 13–2 (10)
1979	Kaneshiro^{†} M7w 12–3 (1)	Wajima; Y2e 12–3 (14) Wakanohana II; Y1e 12–3 (5)	Kitanoumi; Y1e 13–2 (11) Mienoumi; O1e 13–2 (4)	Mienoumi; O1e 14–1–P (5)	Wakanohana II; Y2w 11–4 (6) Mienoumi; Y2e 11–4 (6)	Wakanohana II; Y2e 12–3 (7)
1978	Wakanohana II; O1e 13–2	Wakanohana II; O1e 13–2–P (2)	Wakanohana II; O1e 13–2–P (3)	Wajima; Y2e 14–1 (12)	Wakanohana II; Y2e 12–3 (4) Kirinji; M5w 12–3 (1)	Wajima; Y2e 13–2 (13)
1977	Kitanoumi; Y1e 12–3 (7) Takanohana I O1w 12–3 (3)	Takanohana I O1e 13–2 (4)	Kitanoumi; Y1e 12–3 (8)	Kitanoumi; Y1e 13–2 (9)	Asahikuni; O1w 14–1 (4)	Kitanoumi; Y1e 13–2 (10)
1976	Wajima; Y1w 12–3 (8) Asahikuni; S1e 12–3 (2) Washūyama; M6e 12–3 (2)	Asahikuni; S1e 13–2–P (3)	Wajima; Y1e 13–2–P (9)	Kitanoumi; Y1w 12–3 (6)	Wajima; Y1e 12–3 (10)	Wajima; Y1e 13–2 (11)
1975	Kaiketsu; S1e 11–4 (4)	Kitanoumi; Y1e 13–2–P (3)	Kaiketsu; O1w 12–3 (5)	Aobajō; M5e 12–3 (x)	Kitanoumi; Y1e 12–3–P (4)	Kitanoumi; Y1e 12–3 (5)
1974	Wajima; Y1e 12–3 (7)	Asahikuni; M9w 11–4 (1)	Masuiyama II; M4e 12–3 (1)	Kitanoumi; O1e 13–2–P (1)	Mienoumi; M10w 11–3–1d (3)	Kitanoumi; Y1w 12–3–P (2)
1973	Wajima; O1w 11–4 (5) Mienoumi; M3w 11–4 (2) Kaiketsu; M1w 11–4 (3)	Wajima; O1e 13–2 (6)	Kiyokuni; O1w 11–4 (4) Daiju; S1e 11–4 (x) Tochiazuma; M9e 11–4 (3) Washūyama; M13w 11–4 (1)	Kitanofuji; Y2e 14–1–P (4)	Kiyokuni; O2w 11–4 (5) Ōnishiki; M11w 11–4 (x)	Kotozakura; Y1w 11–4 (3) Kurohimeyama; M5w 11–4 (2)
1972	Kotozakura; O2w 10–5 (2) Wajima; K1e 10–5 (2) Hasegawa; S2e 10–5 (2) Fukunohana; M3w 10–5 (2) Wakafutase; M10e 10–5 (x)	Kaiketsu; M7w 12–3–P (1)	Daikirin; O2w 11–4 (4) Takanohana I K1e 11–4 (1) Kaiketsu; K2e 11–4 (2)	Takanohana I S1w 12–3 (2)	Wajima; S2e 13–2 (3)	Wajima; O1e 11–4 (4) Fukunohana; M14w 11–4 (3)
1971	Tamanoumi; Y1e 14–1–P (10)	Taihō; Y1w 12–3 (12)	Tamanoumi; Y1e 13–2 (11) Kiyokuni; O2e 13–2 (3)	Daikirin; O1w 11–4 (3)	Tamanoumi; Y1e 12–3 (12)	Mienoumi; K1w 11–4 (1) Wajima; M1e 11–4 Fujizakura; M6w 11–4 (x) Kurohimeyama; M2w 11–4 (1)
1970	Tamanoumi; O1w 13–2–P (7)	Taihō; Y1e 12–3 (10) Tamanoumi; Y1w 13–2 (8) Kitanofuji; Y1e 13–2 (3)	Tamanoumi; Y2w 12–3 (9) Maenoyama; S1e 12–3 (1)	Maenoyama; S1e 13–2–P (2)	Ryūko; M11e 13–2 (3)	Taihō; Y1w 14–1–P (11)
1969	Tamanoumi; O1e 12–3 (6)	Ryūko; M9w 12–3 (1)	Kiyokuni; S1w 12–3 (2)	Fujinokawa; M5e 12–3–P (2)	Kitanofuji; O2e 12–3 (2)	Daikirin; K1e 11–4 (2) Ryūko; M6w 11–4 (2)
1968	Tamanoumi; O1e 12–3 (3)	Tamanoumi; O1e 12–3 (4) Yutakayama; O2w 12–3 (7) Daikirin; K1e 12–3 (1)	Yutakayama; O1w 10–5 (8) Kitanofuji; O2w 10–5 (1) Fujinokawa; M5e 10–5 (1) Tochiazuma; M2w 10–5 (1)	Mutsuarashi; M5w 12–3 (2)	Myōbudani; M7e 11–4 (4) Tochiazuma; M3w 11–4 (2)	Tamanoumi; O1e 12–3 (5)
1967	Sadanoyama; Y2e 14–1 (9)	Taihō; Y1e 13–2 (8) Mutsuarashi; M14e 13–2 (1)	Kashiwado; Y1w 13–2 (14) Hasegawa; M7w 13–2 (1)	Kotozakura; S1w 11–4 (1) Wakanami; M6e 11–4 (x)	Sadanoyama; Y1w 12–3 (10)	Kashiwado; Y2e 11–4 (15) Taihō; Y1e 11–2–2 (9) Tamanoumi; O1w 11–4 (2) Fukunohana; M5w 11–4 (1)
1966	Tamanoumi; M8w 13–2 (1)	Kōtetsuyama; M9w 11–4 (1)	Kashiwado; Y1w 12–3 (11)	Kashiwado; YO1w 12–3 (12)	Kashiwado; Y1w 13–2–P (13)	Kōtetsuyama; M4w 12–3 (2)
1965	Wakasugiyama; M13w 12–3 (x)	Sadanoyama; Y1w 12–3 (6)	Yutakayama; O1e 11–4 (6) Maedagawa; M9w 11–4 (2) Myōbudani; M4e 11–4 (2)	Kashiwado; Y2e 12–3 (10) Sadanoyama; Y1e 12–3 (7)	Sadanoyama; Y1w 12–3–P (8) Myōbudani; M5e 12–3–P (3)	Wakamisugi; M6w 12–3 (2)
1964	Kiyokuni; M13e 14–1 (1)	Kashiwado; Y1w 14–1 (9)	Kitabayama; O1e 12–3 (3)	Yutakayama; O2w 13–2 (5)	Sadanoyama; O2w 13–2 (4)	Sadanoyama; O1e 13–2 (5)
1963	Yutakayama; S1e 13–2 (3)	Tochihikari; O2e 13–2 (4)	Yutakayama; O2w 13–2 (4)	Sadanoyama; O1w 13–2–P (3)	Taihō; Y1e 14–1 (6)	Taihō; Y1e 12–3 (7) Kainoyama; M6w 12–3 (x)
1962	Yutakayama; M9e 12–3 (1)	Taihō; Y1e 13–2–P (5)	Tochihikari; S2w 13–2 (2) Sadanoyama; O1w 13–2 (1)	Kashiwado; Y1w 11–4 (7) Tochihikari; O2w 11–4 (3) Tsurugamine; M7w 11–4 (2)	Sadanoyama; O2e 13–2–P (2)	Kashiwado; Y1w 12–3 (8) Yutakayama; S1e 12–3 (2) Wakamisugi; M10w 12–3 (1)
1961	Wakanohana I Y1w 12–3 (7) Kotogahama; O2e 12–3 (5)	Kashiwado; O1e 12–3 (4) Taihō; O2w 12–3 (3) Maedagawa; M8w 12–3 (1)	Taihō; O1w 11–4 (4) Kitabayama; S1w 11–4 (2) Hagurohana; M6w 11–4 (x)	Asashio III; Y1w 12–3 (3)	Kashiwado; O1w 12–3–PP (5) Myōbudani; M4w 12–3–PP (1)	Kashiwado; Y2e 12–3 (6)
1960	Taihō; M13w 12–3 (1)	Tochinishiki; Y1e 14–1 (9)	Wakanohana I Y1e 13–2 (6) Wakachichibu; M14w 13–2 (2)	Iwakaze; M7w 12–3 (x)	Kashiwado; O1w 12–3 (3) Taihō; S1w 12–3 (2)	Wakahaguro; S2w 12–3 (3)
1959	Asashio III; O1e 11–4 (1) Kitabayama; M10e 11–4 (1)	Asashio III; O1e 13–2 (2) Kashiwado; M13w 13–2 (1)	Tochinishiki; Y1e 14–1–P (6)	Kotogahama; O1e 12–3 (4) Fujinishiki; M14w 12–3 (1)	Tochinishiki; Y1e 12–3 (7) Wakahaguro; O1w 12–3 (2) Kashiwado; M3e 12–3 (2)	Tochinishiki; Y1w 12–3 (8) Haguroyama; Sw 12–3 (x) Tamanoumi; M1w 12–3 (2) Fujinishiki; M11e 12–3 (2)
1958	Chiyonoyama; Y2e 12–3 (5) Ouchiyama; M14e 12–3 (2)	Kotogahama; S1e 13–2 (3)	Chiyonoyama; Y1e 12–3 (6)	Tochinishiki; Y1e 12–3 (5)	Tokitsuyama; M4e 12–3 (5) Wakachichibu; M18w 12–3 (1)	Wakanohana I Y1e 12–1–1d (5)

== 1909 to 1957 ==
The tables list all makuuchi runners-up until 1957, before the conception of the current bimonthly schedule. The system was less regularized between years, with a different number of tournaments held at different times and in different venues, and often with a changing number of bouts fought in each tournament.

Playoffs were first introduced in 1947. From 1909 until 1946 a tie for first place would not be resolved, but rather the highest ranked wrestler would automatically be considered the champion.

	January	March	May	September	November
	Tokyo	Osaka	Tokyo	Tokyo	Kyushu
1957	Tochihikari; M6w 12–3 (2) Dewanishiki; M7w 12–3 (2)	Tokitsuyama; M5w 12–3 (4) Kotogahama; M8e 12–3 (1) Kitanonada; M11e 12–3 (x)	Tochinishiki; Y1e 12–3 (3) Kotogahama; K2w 12–3 (2)	Wakasegawa; M10w 12–3 (2)	Tochinishiki; Y1w 12–3 (4) Wakanohana I O1e 12–3 (4)

	New Year	Spring	Summer	Autumn
	Tokyo	Osaka	Tokyo	Tokyo
1956	Tsurugamine; M10e 14–1–P (1)	Wakanohana I S1e 12–3–P (2) Wakahaguro; M15e 12–3–P (1)	Ohikari; M9w 12–3–P (1)	Yoshibayama; Y2e 12–3 (5) Wakanohana I O1e 12–3 (3) Tokitsuyama; M7w 12–3 (3)
1955	Tokitsuyama; M9w 12–3–P (1)	Ouchiyama; S1e 13–2–P (1)	Tokitsuyama; M1w 12–3 (2)	Matsunobori; S1e 13–2 (x)
1954	Kagamisato; Y2e 13–2 (5)	Naruyama; M11w 11–4 (2) Futaseyama; M9e 11–4 (x) Daitenryū; M21e 11–4 (x)	Chiyonoyama; Y1w 12–3 (3)	Chiyonoyama; Y1e 12–3 (4)
1953	Tamanoumi; M9e 13–2 (1)	Azumafuji; Y2w 12–3 (6)	Yoshibayama; O1w 14–1 (4)	Naruyama; M17e 12–3 (1)

	Spring	Summer	Autumn
	Tokyo	Tokyo	Tokyo
1952	Chiyonoyama; Y2w 13–2 (2)	Shimizugawa; M10e 12–3 (x) Oiwazan; M19w 12–3 (x)	Kagamisato; O1e 12–3 (4) Yoshibayama; O1w 12–3 (3)
1951	Yoshibayama; S1e 13–2 (2) Mitsuneyama; S2e 13–2 (2)	Azumafuji; Y2e 12–3 (5) Onobori; M14e 12–3 (x)	Kagamisato; Ow 12–3 (3)
1950	Kagamisato; Se 11–4 (2) Wakanohana I M18w 11–4 (1)	Haguroyama; Y1e 12–3 (6)	Yoshibayama; S2e 13–2 (1)
1949	Kotonishiki; M7e 10–3 (x) Kuninobori; M17w 10–3 (x)	Hajimayama; M17w 13–2 (x)	Haguroyama; Y1w 12–3 (5) Kagamisato; M1e 12–3 (1) Tochinishiki; M7w 12–3 (2)
1948	Not held	Terukuni; Y1w 9–2 (5) Tokachiiwa; M11e 9–2 (x) Orochigata; M17w 9–2 (x)	Azumafuji; S1w 10–1–P (4)
1947	Not held	Maedayama; O1w 9–1–PP (3) Azumafuji; O2w 9–1–P (3) Rikidōzan; M8e 9–1–P (x)	Dewanishiki; M11w 9–2 (1) Tochinishiki; M16w 9–2 (1)
1946	Not held	Not held	Maedayama; O2e 11–2 (2) Shionoumi; S1e 11–2 (x) Masuiyama; M6e 11–2 (x) Mitsuneyama; M10w 11–2 (1)
1945	Not held	Akinoumi; Y2e 6–1 (3) Azumafuji; S1e 6–1 (2) Kashimanada; M7e 6–1 (2)	Chiyonoyama; M10e 10–0++ (1)
1944	Haguroyama; Y2w 12–3 (4)	Futabayama; Y2e 9–1 (4)	Azumafuji; S1w 9–1++ (1) Wakasegawa; M14w 9–1++ (1)
1943	Terukuni; Y2e 14–1 (4)	Haguroyama; Y2e 14–1 (3)	Not held
1942	Haguroyama; Y2e 13–2 (2) Akinoumi; O2w 13–2 (1)	Akinoumi; O1w 13–2++ (2) Terukuni; O2w 13–2++ (3)	Not held
1941	Haguroyama; O1w 14–1++ (1)	Futabayama; Y1 13–2 (3) Terukuni; S1e 13–2 (2) Tamanoumi; Kw 13–2 (x)	Not held
1940	Terukuni; M2e 12–3 (1)	Itsutsushima; S2w 13–2 (x)	Not held
1939	Hishuzan; M12w 12–1 (x)	Matsunosato; M14e 12–3 (x)	Not held
1938	Maedayama; Ke 11–2 (1)	Kashimanada; M14e 12–1 (1)	Not held
1937	Kyushuzan; M7w 10–1 (x)	Shimizugawa; O1w 10–3 (5) Ayanobori; M10w 10–3 (3)	Not held
1936	Minanogawa^{‡} Oe 9–2 (9) Futabayama; M3e 9–2 (2)	Tamanishiki; Y 10–1 (11)	Not held
1935	Kagamiiwa; M8e 10–1++ (2)	Musashiyama; O1e 9–2 (7) Ayanobori; M5w 9–2 (2)	Not held
1934	Musashiyama; Oe 8–3 (5) Hatasegawa; M1e 8–3 (x) Taikyuzan; M2e 8–3 (x) Kaikozan; M9e 8–3 (x) Toshuzan; M11w 8–3 (x) Ayanobori; M12e 8–3 (1)	Tamanishiki; Y 9–2 (10) Musashiyama; O1e 9–2 (6) Banshinzan; M8w 9–2 (x)	Not held
1933	Tamanishiki; Y 9–1–1d (9)	Takaragawa; M14w 10–1++ (x)	Not held

	Spring	March	Summer	October
	Tokyo	varied	Tokyo	varied
1932	Tamanishiki; O1e 7–1 (7)	Tamanishiki; O1e 8–2 (8) Shimizugawa; Sw 8–2 (3) Futabayama; M4w 8–2 (1)	Shimizugawa; O2e 10–1++ (4)	Okitsuumi; Se 9–2++ (x) Takanobori; M1w 9–2++ (x) Tamanoura; M6w 9–2++ (x)
1931	Asashio^{†} Se 9–2++ (4) Kagamiiwa; M14e 9–2++ (1)	Musashiyama; Kw 10–1++ (4)	Shimizugawa; M3w 10–1++ (2)	Tamanishiki; O1w 9–2 (6) Shinobuyama; M5e 9–2 (2)
1930	Tamanishiki; Se 9–2++ (4) Musashiyama; M2e 9–2++ (2)	Tenryū; M1e 10–1++ (2)	Ōnosato I O1e 9–2 (4) Tamanishiki; O2w 9–2 (5)	Musashiyama; Ke 9–2++ (3) Asashio^{†} M1w 9–2++ (3) Shimizugawa; M3w 9–2++ (1)
1929	Toyokuni^{‡} O1w 9–2 (3) Shinobuyama; M12e 9–2 (1)	Tamanishiki; Se 9–2++ (2) Asashio^{†} M4w 9–2++ (1)	Tamanishiki; Se 9–2 (3) Wakabayama; K1e 9–2 (x) Wakashima; M7e 9–2 (x) Musashiyama; M8e 9–2 (1)	Miyagiyama; Yw 8–3++ (x) Toyokuni^{‡} O1w 8–3++ (4) Minanogawa^{‡} M2w 8–3++ (2)
1928	Misugiiso; M13w 10–1++ (x)	Tsunenohana; Y1w 10–1++ (3)	Tamanishiki; Sw 9–2 (1) Hoshikabuto; M9e 9–2 (x) Tenryū; M13w 9–2 (1)	Tsunenohana; Y1w 9–2++ (4) Noshirogata; O2e 9–2++ (2)
1927	Hitachiiwa; Sw 9–2 (2)	Ōnosato I O1w 9–2 (3) Onogawa^{†} Se 9–2 (1) Hitachiiwa; Sw 9–2 (3)	Onogawa^{†} S2e 9–2 (2) Rainomine; M15w 9–2 (x)	Noshirogata; O1w 10–1++ (1)

- March tournaments were held at the following locations: 1927, 1929, 1930 and October 1931 in Osaka; 1928 and 1931 in Nagoya; 1932 in Kyoto.
- October tournaments were held at the following locations: 1927 and 1932 in Kyoto, 1928 in Hiroshima, 1929 in Nagoya, 1930 in Fukuoka, 1931 in Osaka.
- The October 1929 tournament was actually held in September.
- The Spring 1932 tournament was actually held in February.

	Spring	Summer
1926	Hitachiiwa; M2w 10–1 (1)	Nishikinada; M12w 10–1++ (x)
1925	Nishinoumi III^{‡} Y2w 9–2 (4)	Dewagatake; M2w 9–2++ (x)
1924	Tsunenohana; Ow 8–2 (2)	Ōnosato I Se 9–2 (2)
1923	Genjiyama^{†} O1w 8–1–1d++ (3)	Orochiyama; M16w 9–1–1++ (x)
1922	Tochigiyama; Y2e 8–1–1a (4)	Asogatake; M10w 7–1–2d (x)
1921	Tochigiyama; Y2w 9–0–1a (3)	Onishiki; Y1e 9–0–1d (4)
1920	Tochigiyama; Y1e 8–2++ (1)	Tochigiyama; Y2w 8–0–1d–1a++ (2)
1919	Ōnosato I M14e 8–1–1a (1)	Genjiyama^{†} M6e 9–1 (2)
1918	Onishiki; Y1e 8–1–1 (3)	Tsunenohana; M1e 8–1–1 (1)
1917	Tachiyama; Y1e 9–1 (4)	Oshio; M13w 9–0–1a++ (x)
1916	Genjiyama^{†} M13e 9–1 (1)	Kanenohana; M7w 8–1–1a (x) Masagoiwa; M10w 8–1–1a (x)
1915	Onishiki; M12e 8–1–1 (1)	Onishiki; K1e 9–1 (2)
1914	Otori; O1e 8–2 (2) Utsunomiya; M18w 8–2 (x)	Tachiyama; Y1w 8–0–1–1a (3)
1913	Hitachiyama; Y1e 6–1–3d (2)	Isenohama; S2e 9–1 (x)
1912	Nishinoumi II; O2w 7–0–1–2d (x)	Otori; Sw 7–1–2d (2) Kashiwado I M17w 7–1–2d (x)
1911	Unryu; M16e 6–0–1–2d–1a (x)	Komagatake; O1e 8–1–1d (x)
1910	Tachiyama; O1w 6–0–1–2d–1a (2)	Kunimiyama; O2w 7–1–2d (x)
1909	see below	Tachiyama; O1w 7–1–2d (1) Hitachiyama; Y1e 8–2 (1)

- Any tournaments predating the second tournament of 1909 did not recognize or award a championship as the yūshō system giving the wrestler with the best tournament record a prize was first introduced by the Mainichi newspaper only in the second half of 1909, and later officially integrated by the JSA in 1926.
- All tournaments were held in Tokyo with the following exceptions: 1918 and 1919, all four in Osaka; Spring 1924 in Nagoya.
- All tournaments were held in either January or May with the following exceptions: Spring 1911 and 1923 in February; Summer 1909, 1910, 1911, 1914 and 1915 in June.

== Most top division runner-up performances ==
	Name	Highest rank	Total
1	Hakuhō	69th yokozuna	22
2	Kitanoumi	55th yokozuna	16
2	Takanohana	65th yokozuna	16
4	Kashiwado	47th yokozuna	15
5	Musashimaru	67th yokozuna	14
5	Wajima	54th yokozuna	14
7	Akebono	64th yokozuna	13
7	Wakanohana II	56th yokozuna	13
9	Kisenosato	72nd yokozuna	12
9	Taihō	48th yokozuna	12
9	Tamanoumi	51st yokozuna	12

== See also ==
- List of active sumo wrestlers
- List of past sumo wrestlers
- List of sumo top division champions
- List of sumo second division champions
- List of active special prize winners
- List of sumo record holders
- List of years in sumo
- Glossary of sumo terms
