= Tokitsuyama Jin'ichi =

Japanese sumo wrestler

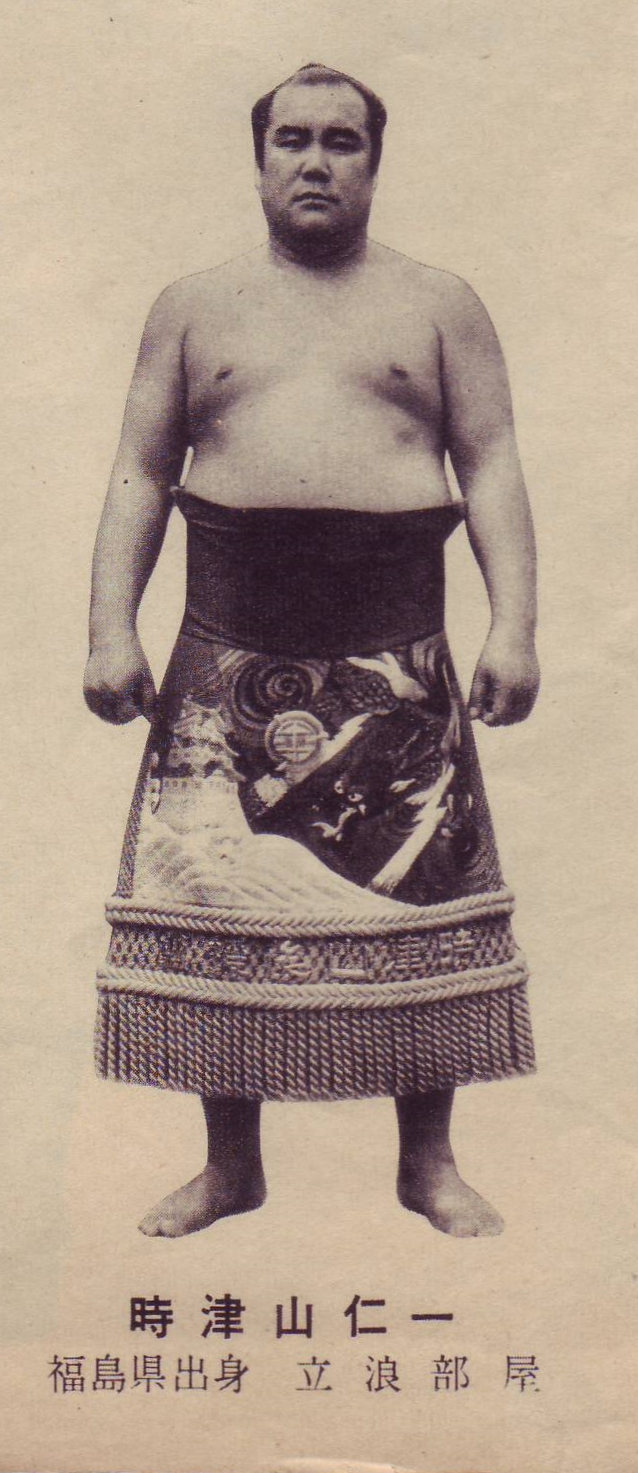

Personal information
- Native name: 時津山 仁一
- Born: Waragai Jin'ichi; March 10, 1925 Iwaki, Fukushima, Japan
- Died: November 21, 1968 (aged 43)
- Height: 1.82 m (5 ft 11 1/2 in)
- Weight: 137 kg (302 lb)

Sport
- Sport: Sumo
- Retired: March, 1961
- Heya: Tatsunami
- Record: 432-390-40
- Debut: May, 1940
- Highest rank: Sekiwake (January 1954)
- Elder name: Oshiogawa
- Championships: 1 (Makuuchi); 1 (Makushita)
- Special Prizes: Outstanding Performance (3); Fighting Spirit (4)
- Gold Stars: 8 Tochinishiki (4); Chiyonoyama (2); Terukuni; Yoshibayama
- Updated on June 2020

Tokitsuyama Jin'ichi (March 10, 1925 – November 21, 1968) was a professional sumo wrestler from Iwaki, Fukushima, Japan who wrestled for Tatsunami stable. He won the top division sumo championship in the summer tournament of 1953 and was runner-up in five other tournaments. His highest rank was sekiwake. After his retirement in 1961 he worked as a coach at Tatsunami stable until his death in 1968.

== Life and career ==
At a young age his parents divorced and he was raised by his grandparents. His first professional tournament was in May 1940 as a wrestler for the former incarnation of Tokitsukaze stable, which was a leftover from the days of Osaka sumo. The stable soon closed however, and he transferred to Tatsunami stable. He tried out a number of ring names before settling on Tokitsuyama to honor the defunct stable he originally debuted for.

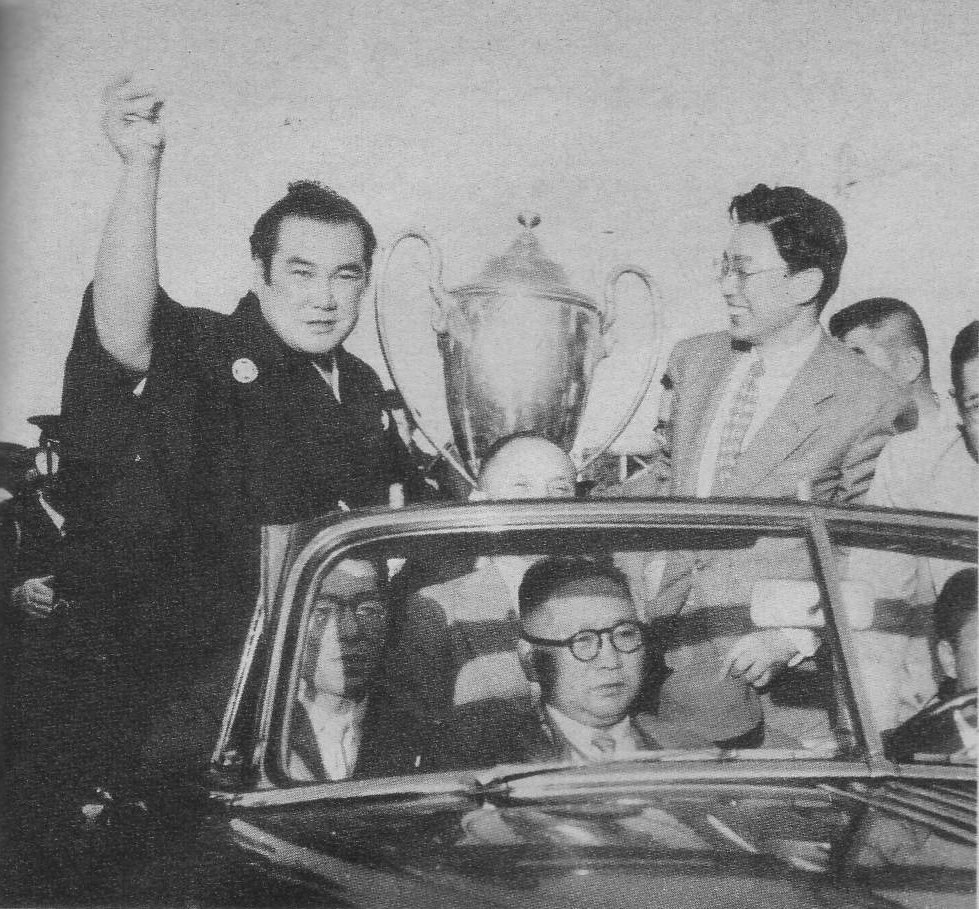
Celebrating his tournament win in May 1953

He was a weak wrestler at first, and he was not able to actually be listed on the sumo ranking sheet known as the banzuke until the January tournament of 1943. He did not really bloom as a strong competitor until after returning as a soldier from World War II. In the 1946 tournament (the only one held that year) he achieved a 7–0 perfect record and also took the championship in the makushita division. Expectations surrounding him began to rise after this. He was promoted to the salaried ranks of jūryō in the following summer tournament of 1947. He was promoted to the top division makuuchi in May 1949, but received a losing record and fell back to jūryō. He was soon back in makuuchi though, and in September 1950 at maegashira 21 he achieved a 12–3 record and the Fighting Spirit Prize. He was a top division regular from then on. Almost three years later, in May 1953 he achieved his one and only top division championship with a perfect 15–0 record. However, as he was only ranked at maegashira 6, the highest ranked opponent he faced that tournament was a komusubi and the two ōzeki at the time Yoshibayama and Tochinishiki, who also had winning streaks in that tournament, never had a chance to face him to even the odds. In the January 1955 tournament he was in a similar situation at maegashira 9. He was in position to win the championship on the final day of the tournament, but this time had to face yokozuna Chiyonoyama in a playoff, which he lost. He was a consistent makuuchi wrestler for many years after this, but began to decline after 1960.

== Retirement from sumo ==
Tokisuyama retired before the 1961 March tournament rather than face demotion to jūryō. He remained in the sumo world after his retirement as an elder of the Japan Sumo Association under the name of Oshiogawa, but died of liver cancer at age 43 in November 1968.

== Fighting style ==
During his career, Tokitsuyama was known for using a variety of techniques such as lifting and inner-thigh throws, and would often twist and turn even the strongest opponents all over the dohyō. This reliance on such techniques also led to inconsistency, and though he was a formidable opponent, he never had more than 12 wins in any tournament besides his championship tournament and was never promoted above sekiwake. Regardless, he was part of a group of well-known top division wrestlers from his same Tatsunami stable at this time, namely Wakahaguro, Annenyama and Kitanonada who were popularly known then as the Four Heavenly Kings, a Buddhist reference.

== Pre-modern sumo record ==
- In 1953 the New Year tournament was begun and the Spring tournament began to be held in Osaka.

Tokitsuyama
-	Spring Haru basho, Tokyo	Summer Natsu basho, Tokyo	Autumn Aki basho, Tokyo
1940	x	(Maezumo)	Not held
1941	(Maezumo)	(Maezumo)	Not held
1942	(Maezumo)	(Maezumo)	Not held
1943	West Jonokuchi #32; 4–4	East Jonidan #77; 5–3	Not held
1944	East Jonidan #29; 3–5	East Jonidan #35; 3–2	East Jonidan #6; 3–2
1945	Not held	Left JSA	East Sandanme #12; 3–2
1946	Not held	Not held	West Makushita #21; 7–0; Champion
1947	Not held	West Jūryō #12; 2–8	East Makushita #1; 4–2
1948	Not held	East Jūryō #10; 6–5	East Jūryō #9; 8–3
1949	West Jūryō #2; 7–6	West Maegashira #21; 4–11	West Jūryō #3; 6–9
1950	East Jūryō #5; 12–3	West Maegashira #18; 6–9	West Maegashira #21; 12–3; F
1951	West Maegashira #7; 8–7	East Maegashira #6; 5–10	West Maegashira #8; 11–4; F
1952	West Komusubi; 2–13	West Maegashira #6; 10–5	West Komusubi; 6–9
Record given as wins–losses–absences Top division champion Top division runner-up Retired Lower divisions Non-participation Sanshō key: F=Fighting spirit; O=Outstanding performance; T=Technique Also shown: ★=Kinboshi; P=Playoff(s); Divisions: Makuuchi — Jūryō — Makushita — Sandanme — Jonidan — Jonokuchi Makuuchi ranks: Yokozuna — Ōzeki — Sekiwake — Komusubi — Maegashira

-	New Year Hatsu basho, Tokyo	Spring Haru basho, Osaka	Summer Natsu basho, Tokyo	Autumn Aki basho, Tokyo
1953	West Maegashira #2; 6–9 ★	West Maegashira #4; 6–9	East Maegashira #6; 15–0; F	East Komusubi; 8–7
1954	East Sekiwake; 6–9	East Maegashira #1; 4–11	West Maegashira #4; 8–7	East Maegashira #2; 3–2–10
1955	West Maegashira #9; 12–3–P; F	East Maegashira #3; 8–7 ★	West Maegashira #1; 12–3; O★	West Sekiwake; 11–4
1956	East Sekiwake; 8–7	West Sekiwake; 7–8	West Komusubi; Sat out due to injury 0–0–15	West Maegashira #7; 12–3
Record given as wins–losses–absences Top division champion Top division runner-up Retired Lower divisions Non-participation Sanshō key: F=Fighting spirit; O=Outstanding performance; T=Technique Also shown: ★=Kinboshi; P=Playoff(s); Divisions: Makuuchi — Jūryō — Makushita — Sandanme — Jonidan — Jonokuchi Makuuchi ranks: Yokozuna — Ōzeki — Sekiwake — Komusubi — Maegashira

== Modern sumo record ==
- Since the addition of the Kyushu tournament in 1957 and the Nagoya tournament in 1958, the yearly schedule has remained unchanged.

Year	January Hatsu basho, Tokyo	March Haru basho, Osaka	May Natsu basho, Tokyo	July Nagoya basho, Nagoya	September Aki basho, Tokyo	November Kyūshū basho, Fukuoka
1957	East Maegashira #1; 5–8–2 ★	West Maegashira #5; 12–3 ★	West Sekiwake; 11–4	Not held	East Sekiwake; 9–6	East Sekiwake; 9–6
1958	West Sekiwake; 6–9	East Maegashira #1; 5–10	East Maegashira #5; 4–6–5 ★	East Maegashira #10; 10–5	East Maegashira #4; 12–3; O★	East Komusubi; 10–5
1959	East Sekiwake; 9–6; O	East Sekiwake; 3–12	West Maegashira #5; 8–7	West Maegashira #2; 2–13	West Maegashira #10; 8–7	West Maegashira #8; 7–8
1960	East Maegashira #9; 6–9	East Maegashira #11; 12–3	East Maegashira #5; 3–12 ★	West Maegashira #10; 9–6	West Maegashira #2; 2–13	West Maegashira #10; 6–9
1961	West Maegashira #14; 1–6–8	West Jūryō #6; Retired; 0–0–15	x	x	x	x
Record given as wins–losses–absences Top division champion Top division runner-up Retired Lower divisions Non-participation Sanshō key: F=Fighting spirit; O=Outstanding performance; T=Technique Also shown: ★=Kinboshi; P=Playoff(s); Divisions: Makuuchi — Jūryō — Makushita — Sandanme — Jonidan — Jonokuchi Makuuchi ranks: Yokozuna — Ōzeki — Sekiwake — Komusubi — Maegashira

== See also ==
- Glossary of sumo terms
- List of past sumo wrestlers
- List of sumo tournament top division champions
- List of sumo tournament top division runners-up
- List of sekiwake
