= Ryūko Seihō =

Japanese sumo wrestler

Personal information
- Native name: 龍虎 勢朋
- Born: Tadakiyo Suzuki; January 9, 1941 Tokyo, Japan
- Died: August 29, 2014 (aged 73)
- Height: 1.86 m (6 ft 1 in)
- Weight: 132 kg (291 lb)

Sport
- Sport: Sumo
- Retired: May, 1975
- Heya: Hanakago
- Record: 357-330-40
- Debut: January, 1957
- Highest rank: Komusubi (March, 1970)
- Elder name: Hanaregoma
- Championships: 2 (Juryo); 2 (Makushita)
- Special Prizes: Outstanding Performance (2); Fighting Spirit (4)
- Gold Stars: 2 (Taihō, Kitanoumi)
- Updated on June 2020

Ryūko Seihō (龍虎 勢朋, Ryūko Seihō; January 9, 1941 – August 29, 2014) was a sumo wrestler with the Hanakago beya, an actor and a celebrity in Japan. He was born in Ōta, Tokyo. His highest rank in sumo was komusubi.

== Sumo ==
=== Career ===
Ryūko made his tournament debut in the January 1957 basho. He reached the juryō division in March 1967, and makuuchi in March 1968. The following year, he defeated yokozuna Taihō, scoring the first of his two kinboshi. He was a runner-up in three top division tournaments, in March 1969, November 1969 and September 1970. His 1970 rise to sanyaku was followed by a 1971 torn achilles tendon, as a result of which he missed three successive tournaments and was demoted from makuuchi all the way down to the third makushita division. He returned to sumo, and after winning championships in the makushita and juryo divisions he regained his position in makuuchi in 1973. He scored his second kinboshi (against Kitanoumi) in 1974. He even managed a return to sanyaku at komusubi in January 1975, the first time that any wrestler had done this after dropping to makushita. However, on the first match of the May tournament in that year, he tore the other Achilles tendon, and retired from sumo. He once told an interviewer that he thought rikishi wrestled too much - "Ninety days a year, such a severe tension, it's too much for a human being."

It was as a direct result of public sympathy for Ryūko's plummet down the rankings that the Japan Sumo Association introduced the kosho seido, or public injury system, whereby a wrestler injured during a tournament could sit out the next one without any effect on his rank.

During his career, he earned several awards, taking the Shukunshō twice and the Kantōshō four times.

=== Fighting style ===
His favourite techniques were tsuppari (thrusting attack), katasukashi (under-shoulder swing down), migi-yotsu (left hand outside, right hand inside mawashi grip), and sotogake (outer leg trip). He most commonly won by hataki-komi (slap down).

=== Retirement ===
After his retirement he worked as a coach at his old stable under the toshiyori or elder name of Hanaregoma, but he left the Sumo Association in February 1977 to seek a new profession.

== Acting ==
Ryūko played the station chief in the 1977 live-actor film version of Kochira Katsushika-ku Kameari Kōen-mae Hashutsujo. He joined the cast of the jidaigeki Abarenbo Shogun during the first series (about 175 episodes), and continued through the second series (about 190 episodes). His character was a retired sumo wrestler named Ryūko. He also appeared as a guest star in an episode of the fifth series.

== Death ==
He died on August 29, 2014, in Kakegawa, Shizuoka of a heart attack.

== Career record ==
- The Nagoya tournament was first held in 1958.

Ryūko Seihō
Year	January Hatsu basho, Tokyo	March Haru basho, Osaka	May Natsu basho, Tokyo	July Nagoya basho, Nagoya	September Aki basho, Tokyo	November Kyūshū basho, Fukuoka
1957	(Maezumo)	(Maezumo)	(Maezumo)	Not held	West Jonokuchi #4; 4–4	East Jonidan #110; 4–4
1958	West Jonidan #96; 4–4	West Jonidan #89; 5–3	East Jonidan #60; 5–3	East Jonidan #38; 4–4	East Jonidan #31; 4–4	West Jonidan #27; 3–5
1959	West Jonidan #34; 3–5	West Jonidan #38; 6–2	West Jonidan #15; 3–5	West Jonidan #19; 4–4	East Jonidan #16; 4–4	West Jonidan #14; 5–3
1960	East Sandanme #101; 3–5	West Sandanme #101; 5–3	East Sandanme #72; 4–4	West Sandanme #67; 4–3	East Sandanme #49; 3–4	East Sandanme #62; 5–2
1961	West Sandanme #34; 6–1	East Makushita #81; 4–3	West Makushita #63; 4–3	East Makushita #55; 3–4	East Makushita #63; 1–6	East Sandanme #2; 5–2
1962	West Makushita #62; 3–4	East Makushita #65; 2–5	East Makushita #79; 6–1	East Makushita #48; 6–1	East Makushita #24; 3–4	West Makushita #23; 3–4
1963	West Makushita #26; 1–5–1	East Makushita #45; 4–3	East Makushita #41; 3–4	West Makushita #44; 4–3	West Makushita #33; 3–4	East Makushita #37; 5–2
1964	East Makushita #24; 3–4	East Makushita #26; 3–4	West Makushita #29; 4–3	West Makushita #25; 2–5	East Makushita #42; 5–2	West Makushita #27; 4–3
1965	East Makushita #25; 3–4	West Makushita #31; 5–2	East Makushita #16; 4–3	West Makushita #12; 4–3	West Makushita #8; 5–2	East Makushita #1; 1–7
1966	East Makushita #16; 4–3	East Makushita #14; 2–5	West Makushita #22; 3–4	West Makushita #26; 3–4	West Makushita #29; 4–3	West Makushita #24; 5–2
1967	East Makushita #14; 7–0; Champion	East Jūryō #16; 10–5	East Jūryō #12; 9–6	West Jūryō #7; 8–7	West Jūryō #4; 5–10	East Jūryō #10; 11–4
1968	East Jūryō #3; 13–2; Champion	West Maegashira #9; 11–4; F	East Maegashira #3; 2–13	West Maegashira #9; 7–8	East Maegashira #10; 9–6	East Maegashira #6; 9–6
1969	East Maegashira #3; 4–11	West Maegashira #9; 12–3; FO	East Maegashira #2; 8–7; O★	East Maegashira #1; 8–7	East Maegashira #1; 3–12	West Maegashira #6; 11–4; F
1970	West Maegashira #1; 9–6	West Komusubi #1; 8–7	East Komusubi #1; 5–10	East Maegashira #3; 2–13	East Maegashira #11; 13–2; F	East Komusubi #1; 6–9
1971	East Maegashira #1; 7–8	West Maegashira #1; 6–9	West Maegashira #2; 4–9–2	East Maegashira #6; 9–6	West Maegashira #1; 6–9	West Maegashira #3; 1–6–8
1972	East Maegashira #12; Sat out due to injury 0–0–15	East Jūryō #8; Sat out due to injury 0–0–15	East Makushita #11; Sat out due to injury 0–0–7	West Makushita #42; 6–1	West Makushita #22; 7–0; Champion	East Makushita #1; 6–1
1973	West Jūryō #8; 8–7	West Jūryō #7; 11–4–P; Champion	West Jūryō #1; 10–5	West Maegashira #12; 10–5	West Maegashira #5; 6–9	West Maegashira #7; 8–7
1974	East Maegashira #5; 7–8	East Maegashira #7; 8–7	East Maegashira #5; 7–8	West Maegashira #4; 5–10	West Maegashira #9; 9–6 ★	West Maegashira #5; 9–6
1975	West Komusubi #1; 3–12	East Maegashira #8; 8–7	West Maegashira #5; Retired; 0–2	x	x	x
Record given as wins–losses–absences Top division champion Top division runner-up Retired Lower divisions Non-participation Sanshō key: F=Fighting spirit; O=Outstanding performance; T=Technique Also shown: ★=Kinboshi; P=Playoff(s); Divisions: Makuuchi — Jūryō — Makushita — Sandanme — Jonidan — Jonokuchi Makuuchi ranks: Yokozuna — Ōzeki — Sekiwake — Komusubi — Maegashira

== See also ==
- Glossary of sumo terms
- List of sumo tournament top division runners-up
- List of sumo tournament second division champions
- List of past sumo wrestlers
- List of komusubi
