= Wakasegawa Taiji =

Sumo wrestler

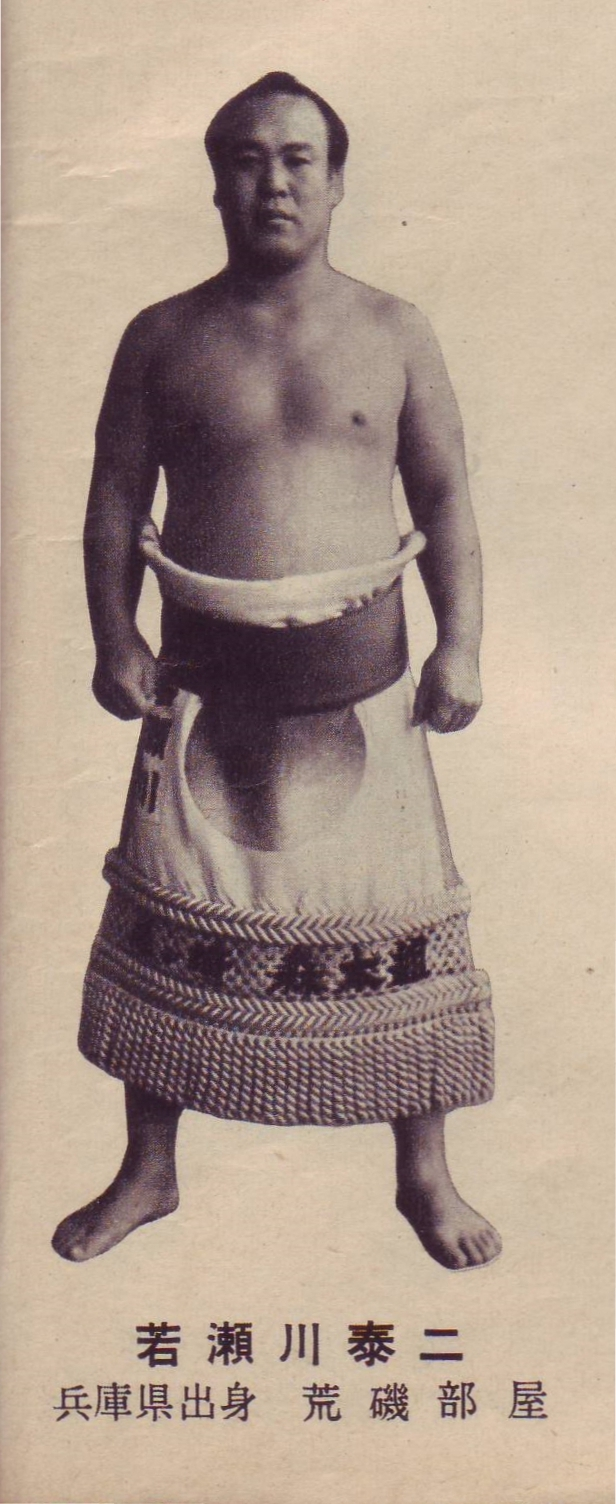

Personal information
- Native name: 若瀬川 泰二 を編集中
- Born: February 20, 1920 Amagasaki, Hyōgo, Japan
- Died: September 3, 1993 (aged 73)
- Height: 176 cm (5 ft 9 in)
- Weight: 110 kg (240 lb)

Sport
- Sport: Sumo
- Retired: January 1939
- Heya: Isegahama, Araiso
- Record: 414-434-19
- Debut: January 1935
- Highest rank: Komusubi (September 1950
- Elder name: Asakayama
- Championships: 1 (Makushita)
- Special Prizes: 3 (Technique); 1 (Fighting Spirit)
- Gold Stars: 7

Wakasegawa Taiji (若瀬川泰二」を編集中, real name Tadao Hattori, 20 February 1920 – 3 September 1993) was a sumo wrestler from Amagasaki, Hyōgo Prefecture, Japan. He made his professional debut in 1935, reaching the top makuuchi division in 1942. His highest rank was komusubi. He was twice runner-up in a tournament and earned seven gold stars for defeating yokozuna and four special prizes. He retired in 1959 at the age of 38 and became an elder of the Japan Sumo Association, working as a coach at Isegahama stable until his mandatory retirement in 1985.

== Career ==
He was a member of the Isegahama stable, a strong stable run by former sekiwake Kiyosegawa that also had yokozuna Terukuni and sekiwake Bishūyama at the time. He fought in the top division for 54 tournaments, which at the time of his retirement was the most ever, winning 352 matches and losing 395, with 19 absences. His best result in a tournament was in November 1944, where at the rank of maegashira 14 he won nine out of his ten bouts, the same as ōzeki Maedayama, but as he was the lower ranking wrestler he had to settle for runner-up honours as there was no playoff system at the time. Thirteen years later in September 1957 he was again runner-up, with a 12–3 record, one win behind yokozuna Tochinishiki. He had to withdraw from the November 1946 tournament through injury, as did Terukuni and Bishuyama, a rare example of three wrestlers from the same stable all missing a tournament. Over his long career he defeated yokozuna seven times, with two wins against Haguroyama, three against Kagamisato, one against Tochinishiki and one against Chiyonoyama. (He had another win over Chiyonoyama by default, which did not count as a kinboshi.) He spent just one tournament in the titled sanyaku ranks, at komusubi in September 1950, where he scored 7–8. He won the prestigious ginosho, or Technique Prize on three occasions, the final time coming in November 1958 at the age of thirty eight years and nine months. This made him the oldest winner of a sanshō until Kyokutenhō surpassed him in November 2014. He also won one Fighting Spirit prize, or kantosho, for his second runner-up performance.

== Retirement from sumo ==
Just one tournament after his final Technique prize, Wakasegawa withdrew on the second day of the January 1959 tournament with an ankle injury and announced his retirement after it ended. He became an elder of the Japan Sumo Association under the name Asakayama. He worked under his former stablemate Terukuni, who had run Araiso stable since his own retirement in 1953, renamed Isegahama stable from 1961. After Terukuni's death in 1977 he worked under the former ōzeki Kiyokuni. He reached the mandatory retirement age in 1985 and left the Sumo Association. He also worked as a sumo commentator for NHK. He died in 1993 at the age of 73 of pancreatic cancer.

== Fighting style ==
Wakasegawa was a yotsu-sumo wrestler, preferring grappling techniques which involved grabbing the opponent's mawashi or belt. His most common winning kimarite was yori-kiri, a straightforward force out. However he was also fond of sotogake, the outer leg trip, winning almost 15 percent of his top division matches this way.

== Career record ==
Wakasegawa Taiji
Year	January Hatsu basho, Tokyo	March Haru basho, Osaka	May Natsu basho, Tokyo	July Nagoya basho, Nagoya	September Aki basho, Tokyo	November Kyūshū basho, Fukuoka
1935	(Maezumo)	x	(Maezumo)	x	x	x
1936	(Maezumo)	x	East Jonokuchi #12; 4–2	x	x	x
1937	West Jonidan #24; 4–2	x	East Sandanme #34; 1–6	x	x	x
1938	East Jonidan #8; 5–2	x	East Sandanme #21; 5–2	x	x	x
1939	West Makushita #35; 6–1	x	East Makushita #7; 4–4	x	x	x
1940	East Makushita #6; 8–0; Champion	x	West Jūryō #6; 4–11	x	x	x
1941	West Jūryō #13; 12–3	x	East Jūryō #2; 9–6	x	x	x
1942	East Maegashira #21; 8–7	x	West Maegashira #11; 6–9	x	x	x
1943	West Maegashira #12; 8–7	x	West Maegashira #9; 8–7	x	x	x
1944	East Maegashira #7; 8–7	x	West Maegashira #3; 1–9	x	x	West Maegashira #14; 9–1
1945	x	x	East Maegashira #4; 4–3	x	x	East Maegashira #3; 5–5
1946	x	x	x	x	x	East Maegashira #3; 4–6–3
1947	x	x	West Maegashira #6; 3–7	x	x	West Maegashira #9; 6–5
1948	x	x	West Maegashira #7; 6–5; T	x	x	West Maegashira #4; 8–3
1949	East Maegashira #1; 7–6	x	East Maegashira #1; 4–11	x	West Maegashira #5; 8–7 ★	x
1950	West Maegashira #1; 7–8	x	West Maegashira #2; 8–7	x	West Komusubi; 7–8	x
1951	West Maegashira #1; 6–9 ★	x	West Maegashira #5; 3–12	x	East Maegashira #9; 9–6	x
1952	East Maegashira #4; 5–10	x	West Maegashira #9; 8–7	x	East Maegashira #5; 6–9	x
1953	East Maegashira #7; 8–7	East Maegashira #5; 9–6	East Maegashira #2; 5–10	x	West Maegashira #4; 4–11	x
1954	West Maegashira #8; 8–7	East Maegashira #6; 9–6; T★	West Maegashira #2; 3–9–3	x	West Maegashira #8; 9–6	x
1955	East Maegashira #6; 9–6 ★★	West Maegashira #3; 4–11 ★	East Maegashira #7; 5–10	x	West Maegashira #11; 9–6	x
1956	West Maegashira #5; 8–7	West Maegashira #1; 2–13 ★	East Maegashira #11; 5–10	x	West Maegashira #17; 9–6	x
1957	West Maegashira #14; 10–5	West Maegashira #6; 6–9	West Maegashira #9; 7–8	x	West Maegashira #10; 12–3; F	West Maegashira #1; 4–11
1958	West Maegashira #6; 9–6	West Maegashira #3; 3–12	West Maegashira #10; 7–8	West Maegashira #11; 8–7	East Maegashira #10; 9–6	East Maegashira #6; 9–6; T
1959	East Maegashira #3; Retired; 0–2–13	x	x	x	x	x
Record given as wins–losses–absences Top division champion Top division runner-up Retired Lower divisions Non-participation Sanshō key: F=Fighting spirit; O=Outstanding performance; T=Technique Also shown: ★=Kinboshi; P=Playoff(s); Divisions: Makuuchi — Jūryō — Makushita — Sandanme — Jonidan — Jonokuchi Makuuchi ranks: Yokozuna — Ōzeki — Sekiwake — Komusubi — Maegashira

== See also ==
- Glossary of sumo terms
- List of sumo tournament top division runners-up
- List of past sumo wrestlers
