= Fukunohana Koichi =

Japanese sumo wrestler

Personal information
- Native name: 福の花 孝一
- Born: Koichi Fukushima; 1 July 1940 (age 86) Kōshi, Kumamoto, Japan
- Height: 1.80 m (5 ft 11 in)
- Weight: 130 kg (290 lb; 20 st)

Sport
- Sport: Sumo
- Retired: November, 1975
- Heya: Dewanoumi
- Record: 638-622-47
- Debut: January, 1958
- Highest rank: Sekiwake (January, 1971)
- Elder name: Sekinoto
- Championships: 1 (Makushita)
- Special Prizes: Fighting Spirit (7)
- Gold Stars: 5 Tamanoumi (2); Kitanofuji (2); Wajima
- Updated on June 2020

Fukunohana Koichi (born 1 July 1940 as Koichi Fukushima) is a former sumo wrestler from Kōshi, Kumamoto, Japan. He made his professional debut in January 1958 and reached the top division in September 1965. His highest rank was sekiwake. He retired in November 1975.

He had been scheduled to fight Kashiwado in July 1969 and Taihō in May 1971, but on both occasions received a fusensho or win by default because the yokozuna both announced their retirements. Fukunohana had never beaten Taihō in the ring, losing to him ten straight times.

He made his only appearance at sekiwake in January 1971, by which time he was already over 30, unusually old for a sekiwake debut at that time. He was three times a tournament runner-up, earned seven special prizes for Fighting Spirit and five gold stars for defeating yokozuna.

In January 1970 he knocked out ōzeki Kitanofuji with a harite or strike with the open hand, a legitimate sumo move, and acquired the nickname "flower of the hook," a play on his shikona Fukunohana.

He became a mentor to Mienoumi, who was a fellow member of Dewanoumi stable, and said that he would not retire until Mienoumi reached the rank of ōzeki. After six straight make-koshi or losing scores in the top division, he announced his retirement after the November 1975 tournament, when Mienoumi's promotion to ōzeki was confirmed.

He became an elder of the Japan Sumo Association under the name Sekinoto, working as a coach at Dewanoumi stable. His wife was the daughter of a previous owner of the Sekinoto elder name, former komusubi Wakashima. He became a special executive in 2000. He left the Sumo Association in 2005 upon turning 65 years of age.

From 2009 until 2011 a junior wrestler at Dewanoumi stable, whose real name was Fukumoto, was given permission to use the Fukunohana shikona.

== Career record ==
Fukunohana Koichi
Year	January Hatsu basho, Tokyo	March Haru basho, Osaka	May Natsu basho, Tokyo	July Nagoya basho, Nagoya	September Aki basho, Tokyo	November Kyūshū basho, Fukuoka
1958	(Maezumō)	(Maezumō)	East Jonokuchi #12; 4–4	West Jonidan #110; 4–4	East Jonidan #103; 5–3	East Jonidan #79; 5–3
1959	West Jonidan #63; 6–2	East Jonidan #32; 4–4	East Jonidan #27; 3–5	West Jonidan #30; 3–5	East Jonidan #37; 4–3–1	East Jonidan #35; 3–2–3
1960	West Jonidan #37; 5–3	West Jonidan #1; 6–2	East Sandanme #65; 5–3	West Sandanme #38; 2–5	East Sandanme #54; 4–3	East Sandanme #42; 5–2
1961	West Sandanme #19; 3–4	East Sandanme #28; 5–2	East Makushita #88; 4–3	East Makushita #77; 5–2	West Makushita #60; 4–3	West Makushita #56; 5–2
1962	West Makushita #36; 5–2	West Makushita #21; 2–5	East Makushita #31; 4–3	West Makushita #25; 2–5	West Makushita #36; 5–2	West Makushita #26; 2–5
1963	West Makushita #36; 4–3	East Makushita #32; 5–2	East Makushita #25; 4–3	West Makushita #19; 3–4	West Makushita #21; 2–5	East Makushita #29; 3–4
1964	West Makushita #36; 4–3	West Makushita #27; 6–1	West Makushita #14; 7–0–P; Champion	West Jūryō #18; 10–5	West Jūryō #9; 8–7	West Jūryō #5; 10–5
1965	West Jūryō #1; Sat out due to injury 0–0–15	East Jūryō #14; 9–6	West Jūryō #5; 8–7	East Jūryō #2; 10–5	East Maegashira #14; 10–5	West Maegashira #5; 6–9
1966	West Maegashira #7; 9–6	East Maegashira #5; Sat out due to injury 0–0–15	West Maegashira #15; 11–4	East Maegashira #7; 9–6	East Maegashira #2; 5–10	East Maegashira #5; 9–6
1967	East Maegashira #1; 8–7	West Komusubi #1; 7–8	West Maegashira #1; 9–6	West Komusubi #1; 2–13	West Maegashira #4; 7–8	West Maegashira #5; 11–4; F
1968	West Komusubi #1; 6–9	East Maegashira #2; 4–11	East Maegashira #7; 4–11	East Jūryō #2; 10–5	West Maegashira #10; 9–6	East Maegashira #7; 9–6
1969	West Maegashira #3; 8–7	West Maegashira #1; 3–9–3	West Maegashira #7; 8–7	West Maegashira #2; 6–9	East Maegashira #4; 5–10	West Maegashira #8; 10–5
1970	East Maegashira #3; 5–10	East Maegashira #6; 8–7	West Maegashira #4; 8–7; F★	East Maegashira #1; 7–8 ★	East Maegashira #2; 6–9 ★	West Maegashira #4; 11–4; F
1971	East Sekiwake #1; 0–9–6	West Maegashira #6; 10–5; F	East Komusubi #1; 7–8	East Maegashira #1; 5–10	West Maegashira #6; 8–7	East Maegashira #3; 6–9
1972	West Maegashira #3; 10–5; F★	West Komusubi #1; 8–7	West Komusubi #1; 6–9	West Maegashira #2; 4–11	West Maegashira #6; 3–12	East Maegashira #14; 11–4; F
1973	East Maegashira #3; 6–9	East Maegashira #6; 8–7	East Maegashira #2; 6–9	East Maegashira #5; 6–5–4	East Maegashira #10; 7–8	East Maegashira #11; 8–7
1974	East Maegashira #10; 9–6	West Maegashira #4; 6–9	West Maegashira #7; 8–7	East Maegashira #3; 5–10	East Maegashira #7; 7–8	West Maegashira #10; 10–5; F★
1975	West Maegashira #1; 6–9	West Maegashira #4; 6–9	West Maegashira #6; 7–8	West Maegashira #7; 7–8	West Maegashira #7; 6–9	East Maegashira #10; Retired; 5–10
Record given as wins–losses–absences Top division champion Top division runner-up Retired Non-participation Jūryō Lower divisions Sanshō key: F=Fighting spirit; O=Outstanding performance; T=Technique Also shown: ★=Kinboshi; P=Playoff(s); Divisions: Makuuchi — Jūryō — Makushita — Sandanme — Jonidan — Jonokuchi Makuuchi ranks: Yokozuna — Ōzeki — Sekiwake — Komusubi — Maegashira

== See also ==
- List of sumo tournament top division runners-up
- Glossary of sumo terms
- List of past sumo wrestlers
- List of sekiwake
