= Wakachichibu Komei =

Japanese sumo wrestler (1939–2014)

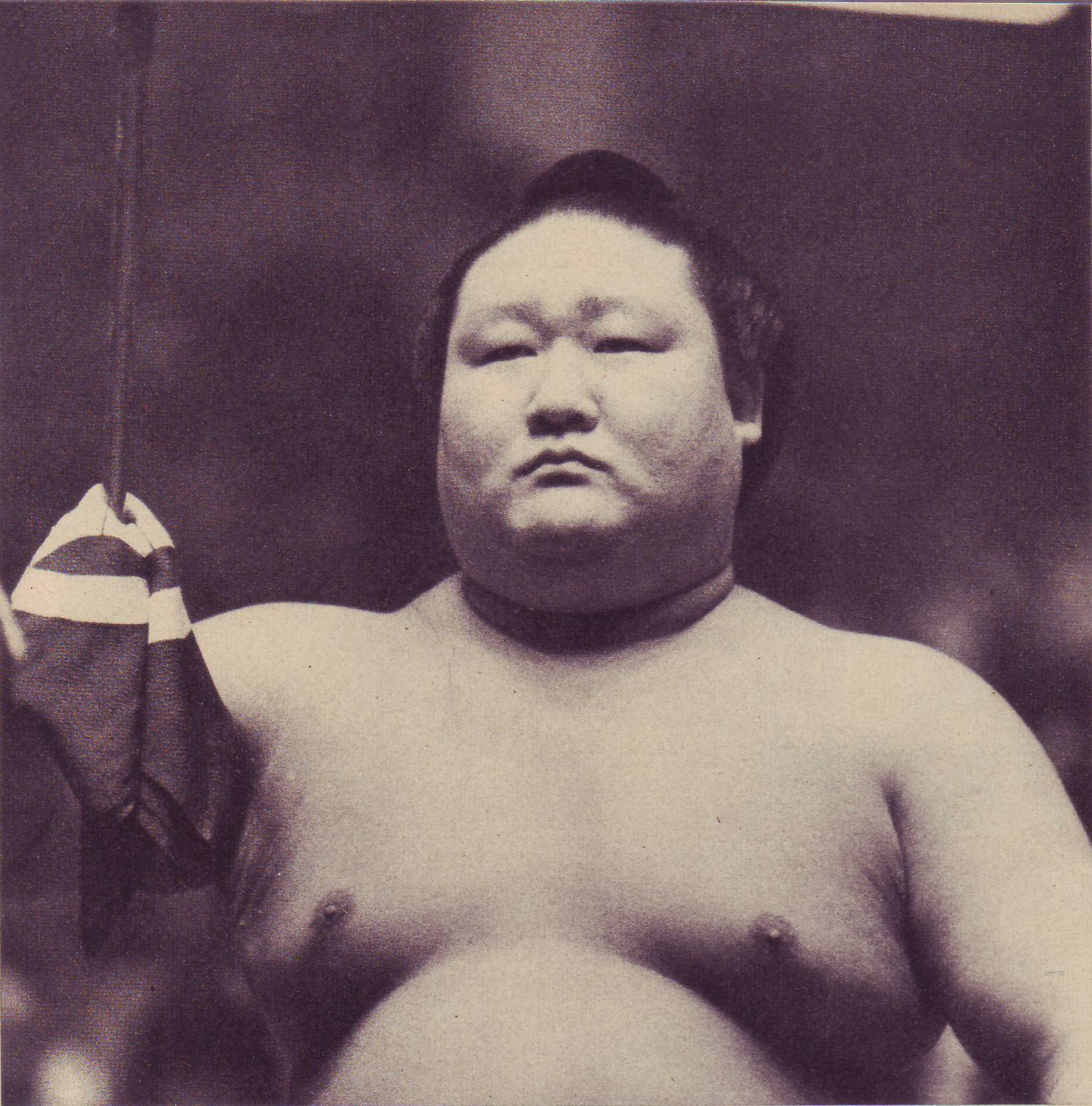

Personal information
- Native name: 若秩父 高明
- Born: Komei Kato; 16 March 1939 Chichibu, Saitama, Japan
- Died: 17 September 2014 (aged 75)
- Height: 1.75 m (5 ft 9 in)
- Weight: 150 kg (330 lb)

Sport
- Sport: Sumo
- Retired: November, 1968
- Heya: Hanakago
- Record: 570-527-5
- Debut: May, 1954
- Highest rank: Sekiwake (July, 1963)
- Elder name: Tokiwayama
- Championships: 2 (Jūryō); 1 (Makushita); 1 (Jonidan)
- Special Prizes: Fighting Spirit (2)
- Gold Stars: 3 Tochinoumi (2); Chiyonoyama
- Updated on June 2020

Wakachichibu Komei (real name Komei Kato, 16 March 1939 – 17 September 2014) was a sumo wrestler from Chichibu, Saitama, Japan. He made his professional debut in May 1954 and reached the top division in September 1958. His highest rank was sekiwake. Upon retirement from active competition he became an elder in the Japan Sumo Association, under the name Tokiwayama. He reached the Sumo Association's mandatory retirement age in March 2004.

== Career record ==
- The Kyushu tournament was first held in 1957, and the Nagoya tournament in 1958.

Wakachichibu Komei
Year	January Hatsu basho, Tokyo	March Haru basho, Osaka	May Natsu basho, Tokyo	July Nagoya basho, Nagoya	September Aki basho, Tokyo	November Kyūshū basho, Fukuoka
1954	x	x	(Maezumo)	Not held	East Jonokuchi #10; 5–3	Not held
1955	East Jonidan #48; 4–4	West Jonidan #31; 4–4	West Jonidan #24; 5–3	Not held	East Jonidan #3; 8–0–PP; Champion	Not held
1956	East Sandanme #59; 8–0–P	West Sandanme #8; 5–3	East Makushita #68; 5–3	Not held	East Makushita #62; 6–2	Not held
1957	East Makushita #46; 6–2	East Makushita #30; 5–3	West Makushita #24; 6–2	Not held	East Makushita #13; 7–1–PPP; Champion	East Makushita #1; 5–3
1958	East Jūryō #24; 11–4	West Jūryō #14; 11–4	West Jūryō #6; 11–4–PPP; Champion	East Jūryō #1; 11–4	West Maegashira #18; 12–3; F	West Maegashira #4; 7–8
1959	West Maegashira #4; 10–5; F★	West Komusubi #1; 2–13	West Maegashira #11; 8–7	East Maegashira #10; 9–6	East Maegashira #4; 7–8	West Maegashira #4; 6–9
1960	West Maegashira #7; 7–8	East Maegashira #9; 5–10	West Maegashira #14; 13–2	East Maegashira #4; 8–7	West Maegashira #1; 4–11	West Maegashira #8; 6–9
1961	West Maegashira #12; 7–8	West Maegashira #12; 4–11	West Jūryō #1; 8–7	East Jūryō #1; 13–2; Champion	West Maegashira #9; 7–8	East Maegashira #10; 10–5
1962	East Maegashira #5; 11–4	East Maegashira #1; 11–4	East Komusubi #1; 5–10	East Maegashira #4; 9–6	East Komusubi #1; 5–10	West Maegashira #3; 6–9
1963	East Maegashira #6; 8–7	West Maegashira #2; 9–6	East Komusubi #1; 11–4	West Sekiwake #1; 8–7	West Sekiwake #1; 5–10	East Maegashira #2; 7–8
1964	East Maegashira #3; 7–8	East Maegashira #3; 2–13	East Maegashira #12; 10–5	East Maegashira #5; 2–13 ★	West Maegashira #13; 10–5	East Maegashira #7; 11–4
1965	East Maegashira #3; 5–10	East Maegashira #7; 10–5	West Maegashira #1; 6–9	West Maegashira #3; 8–7 ★	West Maegashira #2; 4–11	West Maegashira #8; 6–9
1966	West Maegashira #13; 9–6	East Maegashira #10; 9–6	East Maegashira #6; 6–9	West Maegashira #8; 8–7	West Maegashira #5; 5–10	West Maegashira #8; 5–10
1967	East Jūryō #1; 10–5	East Maegashira #13; 8–7	West Maegashira #12; 5–10	East Jūryō #4; 9–6	West Jūryō #1; 8–7	West Maegashira #11; 4–11
1968	West Jūryō #3; 5–10	East Jūryō #9; 8–7	East Jūryō #7; 7–8	West Jūryō #8; 8–7	East Jūryō #5; 3–12	West Jūryō #12; Retired; 1–9–5
Record given as wins–losses–absences Top division champion Top division runner-up Retired Lower divisions Non-participation Sanshō key: F=Fighting spirit; O=Outstanding performance; T=Technique Also shown: ★=Kinboshi; P=Playoff(s); Divisions: Makuuchi — Jūryō — Makushita — Sandanme — Jonidan — Jonokuchi Makuuchi ranks: Yokozuna — Ōzeki — Sekiwake — Komusubi — Maegashira

== See also ==
- Glossary of sumo terms
- List of past sumo wrestlers
- List of sumo tournament top division runners-up
- List of sumo tournament second division champions
- List of sekiwake
