= Kitabayama Hidetoshi =

Japanese sumo wrestler (1935–2010)

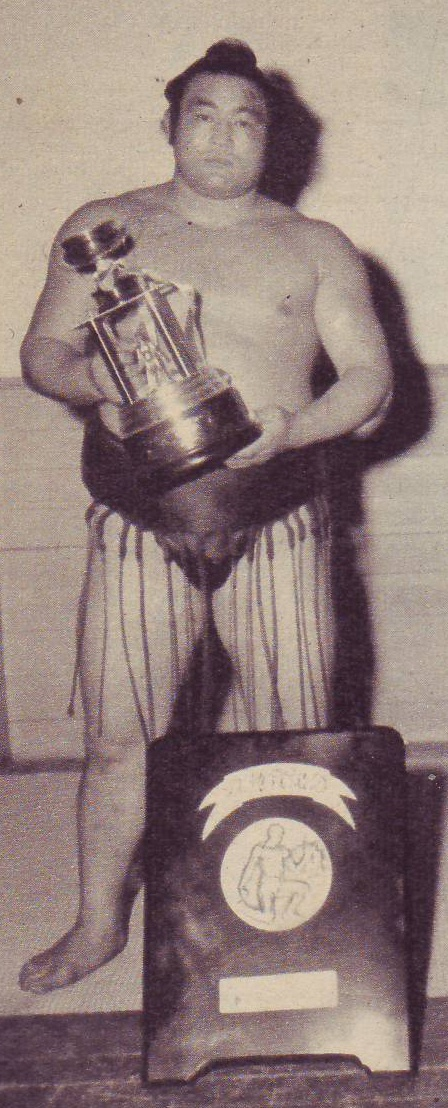
- Kitabayama with his Outstanding Performance Award in 1961

Personal information
- Native name: 北葉山 英俊
- Born: Hidetoshi Yamada; 17 May 1935 Hokkaido, Japan
- Died: 20 July 2010 (aged 75)
- Height: 1.73 m (5 ft 8 in)
- Weight: 119 kg (262 lb)

Sport
- Sport: Sumo
- Retired: May 1966
- Heya: Tokitsukaze
- Record: 522–327–21
- Debut: May 1954
- Highest rank: Ōzeki (July 1961)
- Elder name: Edagawa
- Championships: 1 (Makuuchi); 1 (Jūryō); 1 (Makushita); 1 (Sandanme)
- Special Prizes: Outstanding Performance (1); Fighting Spirit (2)
- Updated on June 2020

Kitabayama Hidetoshi (17 May 1935 – 20 July 2010) was a former sumo wrestler and coach from Muroran, Hokkaidō, Japan. His highest rank was ōzeki.

== Career ==
Kitabayama entered sumo in May 1954, joining Tokitsukaze stable. He was recruited by the legendary former yokozuna Futabayama. He was 173 cm tall and weighed 119 kg, which would make him extremely small by today's sumo standards. After winning the jūryō championship in September 1958 with a 14–1 record he entered the top makuuchi division in November 1958. He was a runner-up in only his second top division tournament and quickly made the san'yaku ranks, reaching sekiwake in November 1959. He was to remain at sekiwake rank for nine of the next ten tournaments. After finishing runner-up to maegashira Sadanoyama in the May 1961 tournament with an 11–4 record he was promoted to ōzeki. He had won 28 bouts over the previous three tournaments, not normally enough for ōzeki promotion, but there were only two ōzeki at the time, and two ageing yokozuna (Asashio and Wakanohana) and so the standard was lowered slightly. In an era dominated by Taihō he was only able to win one tournament championship, in July 1963, when he defeated Sadanoyama in a playoff. He was also runner-up for a third time in the May 1964 tournament. He held his ōzeki rank for a total of 30 tournaments over a period of five years. This was the first time a sumo wrestler has competed as ozeki for thirty or more tournaments.

== Retirement from sumo ==
Kitabayama retired from active competition in May 1966, following two losing scores in his last two tournaments (a third would have seen him demoted from the ōzeki rank). He remained in the sumo world as an elder under the toshiyori name Edagawa and worked as a coach at Tokitsukaze stable. He was also on the board of Directors of the Japan Sumo Association and worked as a judge of tournament bouts. He left the Sumo Association in 2000 upon reaching the mandatory retirement age of sixty-five. He died in 2010 from cancer of the liver.

== Fighting style ==
Kitabayama's favoured techniques were hidari-yotsu (a right hand outside, left hand inside grip on his opponent's mawashi), yori kiri (force out) and utchari (ring edge throw). Other kimarite he regularly used were uwatenage (overarm throw) and tsuridashi (lift out).

== Career record ==
- The Kyushu tournament was first held in 1957, and the Nagoya tournament in 1958.

Kitabayama Hidetoshi
| Year | January Hatsu basho, Tokyo | March Haru basho, Osaka | May Natsu basho, Tokyo | July Nagoya basho, Nagoya | September Aki basho, Tokyo | November Kyūshū basho, Fukuoka |
|---|---|---|---|---|---|---|
| 1954 | x | x | Shinjo; 3–0 | Not held | East Jonidan #54; 8–0–P | Not held |
| 1955 | East Sandanme #76; 6–2 | West Sandanme #41; 4–4 | West Sandanme #34; 8–0; Champion | Not held | West Makushita #46; 3–5 | Not held |
| 1956 | East Makushita #51; 4–4 | West Makushita #50; 6–2 | East Makushita #39; 5–3 | Not held | West Makushita #32; 6–2 | Not held |
| 1957 | East Makushita #21; 6–2 | East Makushita #9; 5–3 | West Makushita #5; 6–2 | Not held | East Makushita #1; 3–5 | East Makushita #4; 3–5 |
| 1958 | East Makushita #10; 8–0; Champion | East Jūryō #18; 10–5 | East Jūryō #13; 11–4–P | East Jūryō #5; 10–5 | East Jūryō #1; 14–1; Champion | West Maegashira #13; 9–6 |
| 1959 | East Maegashira #10; 11–4 | West Maegashira #4; 8–7 | East Maegashira #3; 9–6 | East Komusubi #1; 8–7 | East Komusubi #1; 8–7 | West Sekiwake #1; 8–7 |
| 1960 | West Sekiwake #1; 9–6 | East Sekiwake #1; 10–5; F | East Sekiwake #1; 7–8 | East Komusubi #1; 11–4 | East Sekiwake #1; 11–4; F | West Sekiwake #1; 9–6 |
| 1961 | East Sekiwake #1; 8–7 | East Sekiwake #1; 9–6 | East Sekiwake #1; 11–4; O | East Ōzeki #2; 8–7 | East Ōzeki #2; 8–7 | West Ōzeki #1; 10–5 |
| 1962 | East Ōzeki #1; 8–7 | West Ōzeki #1; 9–6 | East Ōzeki #1; 9–6 | West Ōzeki #1; 9–6 | West Ōzeki #2; 11–4 | East Ōzeki #2; Sat out due to injury 0–0–15 |
| 1963 | West Ōzeki #2; 9–6 | East Ōzeki #3; 8–7 | East Ōzeki #2; 9–6 | East Ōzeki #3; 13–2–P | West Ōzeki #1; 10–5 | West Ōzeki #2; 8–7 |
| 1964 | West Ōzeki #2; 9–6 | West Ōzeki #1; 10–5 | East Ōzeki #1; 12–3 | East Ōzeki #1; 12–3 | West Ōzeki #1; 11–4 | East Ōzeki #2; 8–7 |
| 1965 | East Ōzeki #2; 8–7 | East Ōzeki #2; 3–6–6 | East Ōzeki #2; 10–5 | West Ōzeki #1; 4–11 | East Ōzeki #2; 8–7 | East Ōzeki #1; 5–10 |
| 1966 | West Ōzeki #1; 8–7 | West Ōzeki #1; 7–8 | West Ōzeki #1; Retired; 6–9 | x | x | x |
Record given as wins–losses–absences Top division champion Top division runner-up Retired Lower divisions Non-participation Sanshō key: F=Fighting spirit; O=Outstanding performance; T=Technique Also shown: ★=Kinboshi; P=Playoff(s); Divisions: Makuuchi — Jūryō — Makushita — Sandanme — Jonidan — Jonokuchi Makuuchi ranks: Yokozuna — Ōzeki — Sekiwake — Komusubi — Maegashira

== See also ==
- Glossary of sumo terms
- List of sumo tournament top division champions
- List of sumo tournament top division runners-up
- List of sumo tournament second division champions
- List of past sumo wrestlers
- List of ōzeki
