= Kotogahama Sadao =

Japanese sumo wrestler

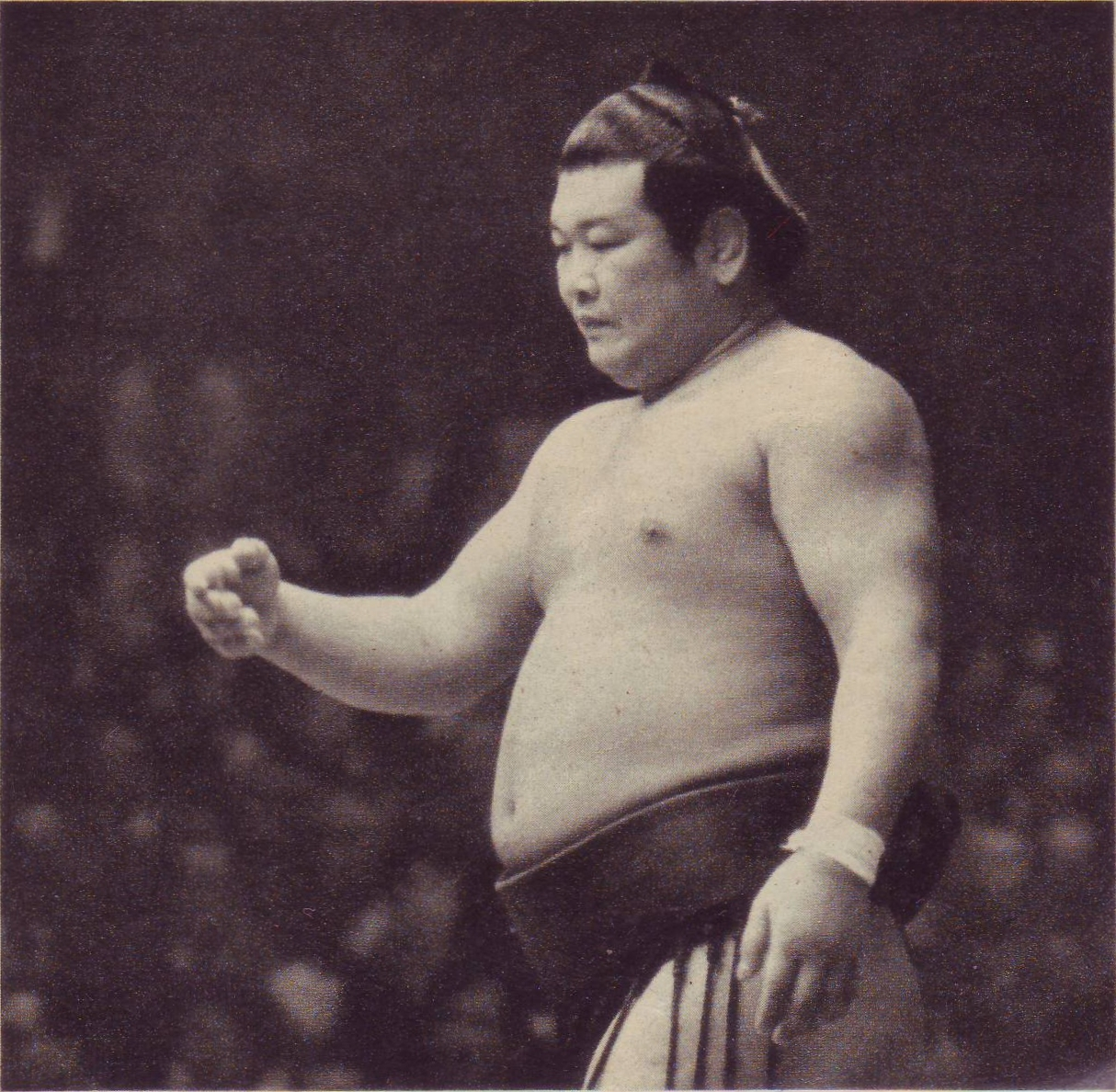

Personal information
- Native name: 琴ヶ濵 貞雄
- Born: Usō Sadao; 10 October 1927 Kanonji, Kagawa, Japan
- Died: 7 June 1981 (aged 53)
- Height: 1.77 m (5 ft 9 1/2 in)
- Weight: 117 kg (258 lb)

Sport
- Sport: Sumo
- Retired: November 1962
- Heya: Nishonoseki → Sadogatake
- Record: 441-352-92
- Debut: November 1945
- Highest rank: Ōzeki (May 1958)
- Elder name: Oguruma
- Special Prizes: Outstanding Performance (2); Technique (5); Fighting Spirit (1)
- Gold Stars: 7 Tochinishiki (3); Chiyonoyama (2); Kagamisato; Yoshibayama
- Updated on June 2020

Kotogahama Sadao (Japanese: 琴ヶ濵貞雄) (10 October 1927 – 7 June 1981) was a sumo wrestler from Kanonji, Kagawa, Japan.

He reached the second highest rank of ōzeki in 1958. He was a tournament runner-up in the top makuuchi division on five occasions and earned seven kinboshi for defeating yokozuna when ranked as a maegashira. After his retirement in 1962 he became an elder in the Japan Sumo Association and worked as a coach at Sadogatake stable. He was offered the chance to take charge of the stable in 1974 but declined, preferring to remain as an assistant coach there until his death in 1981.

== Pre-modern top division record ==
- The New Year tournament began and the Spring tournament returned to Osaka in 1953.

Kotogahama Sadao
-	Spring Haru basho, Tokyo	Summer Natsu basho, Tokyo	Autumn Aki basho, Tokyo
1950	East Jūryō #2; 8–7	West Maegashira #22; 8–7	West Maegashira #17; 9–6
1951	West Maegashira #13; 8–7	East Maegashira #12; 8–7	East Maegashira #7; 6–6–3
1952	East Maegashira #9; 10–5	East Maegashira #4; 6–9	West Maegashira #6; 11–4
Record given as wins–losses–absences Top division champion Top division runner-up Retired Lower divisions Non-participation Sanshō key: F=Fighting spirit; O=Outstanding performance; T=Technique Also shown: ★=Kinboshi; P=Playoff(s); Divisions: Makuuchi — Jūryō — Makushita — Sandanme — Jonidan — Jonokuchi Makuuchi ranks: Yokozuna — Ōzeki — Sekiwake — Komusubi — Maegashira

-	New Year Hatsu basho, Tokyo	Spring Haru basho, Osaka	Summer Natsu basho, Tokyo	Autumn Aki basho, Tokyo
1953	West Komusubi #1; 5–10	East Maegashira #3; 7–8 ★	West Maegashira #4; 5–10	East Maegashira #7; 7–8
1954	East Maegashira #8; 7–8	West Maegashira #9; 9–6	East Maegashira #5; 8–7	West Maegashira #2; 7–8
1955	East Maegashira #4; 7–8 ★	West Maegashira #5; 10–5 ★T	East Maegashira #1; 7–8 ★	West Maegashira #2; 5–10
1956	West Maegashira #6; 10–5 ★	East Maegashira #1; 9–6 ★★	East Komusubi #1; 10–5; T	West Sekiwake #1; 7–8
Record given as wins–losses–absences Top division champion Top division runner-up Retired Lower divisions Non-participation Sanshō key: F=Fighting spirit; O=Outstanding performance; T=Technique Also shown: ★=Kinboshi; P=Playoff(s); Divisions: Makuuchi — Jūryō — Makushita — Sandanme — Jonidan — Jonokuchi Makuuchi ranks: Yokozuna — Ōzeki — Sekiwake — Komusubi — Maegashira

== Modern top division record ==
- Since the addition of the Kyushu tournament in 1957 and the Nagoya tournament in 1958, the yearly schedule has remained unchanged.

Year	January Hatsu basho, Tokyo	March Haru basho, Osaka	May Natsu basho, Tokyo	July Nagoya basho, Nagoya	September Aki basho, Tokyo	November Kyūshū basho, Fukuoka
1957	West Komusubi #2; 1–8–6	East Maegashira #8; 12–3; F	West Komusubi #2; 12–3; T	Not held	West Sekiwake #2; 11–4; T	East Sekiwake #1; 10–5
1958	East Sekiwake #1; 11–4; O	East Sekiwake #1; 13–2; TO	West Ōzeki #1; 11–4	East Ōzeki #1; 10–5	East Ōzeki #1; 11–4	East Ōzeki #1; 10–5
1959	West Ōzeki #1; 2–6–7	West Ōzeki #1; 11–4	East Ōzeki #1; 8–7	East Ōzeki #1; 12–3	East Ōzeki #1; 0–6–9	West Ōzeki #1; 10–5
1960	West Ōzeki #1; 9–6	East Ōzeki #1; 8–7	East Ōzeki #1; 3–7–5	West Ōzeki #1; 10–5	East Ōzeki #1; 6–9	East Ōzeki #2; 1–6–8
1961	East Ōzeki #2; 12–3	East Ōzeki #1; 9–6	West Ōzeki #2; 5–10	West Ōzeki #3; 0–5–10	West Ōzeki #3; 9–6	West Ōzeki #1; 3–7–5
1962	West Ōzeki #1; 9–6	East Ōzeki #1; 4–7–4	West Ōzeki #2; 0–0–15	East Ōzeki #3; 10–5	West Ōzeki #1; 2–8–5	East Ōzeki #3; Retired; 0–0–15
Record given as wins–losses–absences Top division champion Top division runner-up Retired Lower divisions Non-participation Sanshō key: F=Fighting spirit; O=Outstanding performance; T=Technique Also shown: ★=Kinboshi; P=Playoff(s); Divisions: Makuuchi — Jūryō — Makushita — Sandanme — Jonidan — Jonokuchi Makuuchi ranks: Yokozuna — Ōzeki — Sekiwake — Komusubi — Maegashira

== See also ==
- Glossary of sumo terms
- List of past sumo wrestlers
- List of sumo tournament top division runners-up
- List of sumo tournament second division champions
- List of ōzeki
