= Maedagawa Katsu =

Japanese sumo wrestler

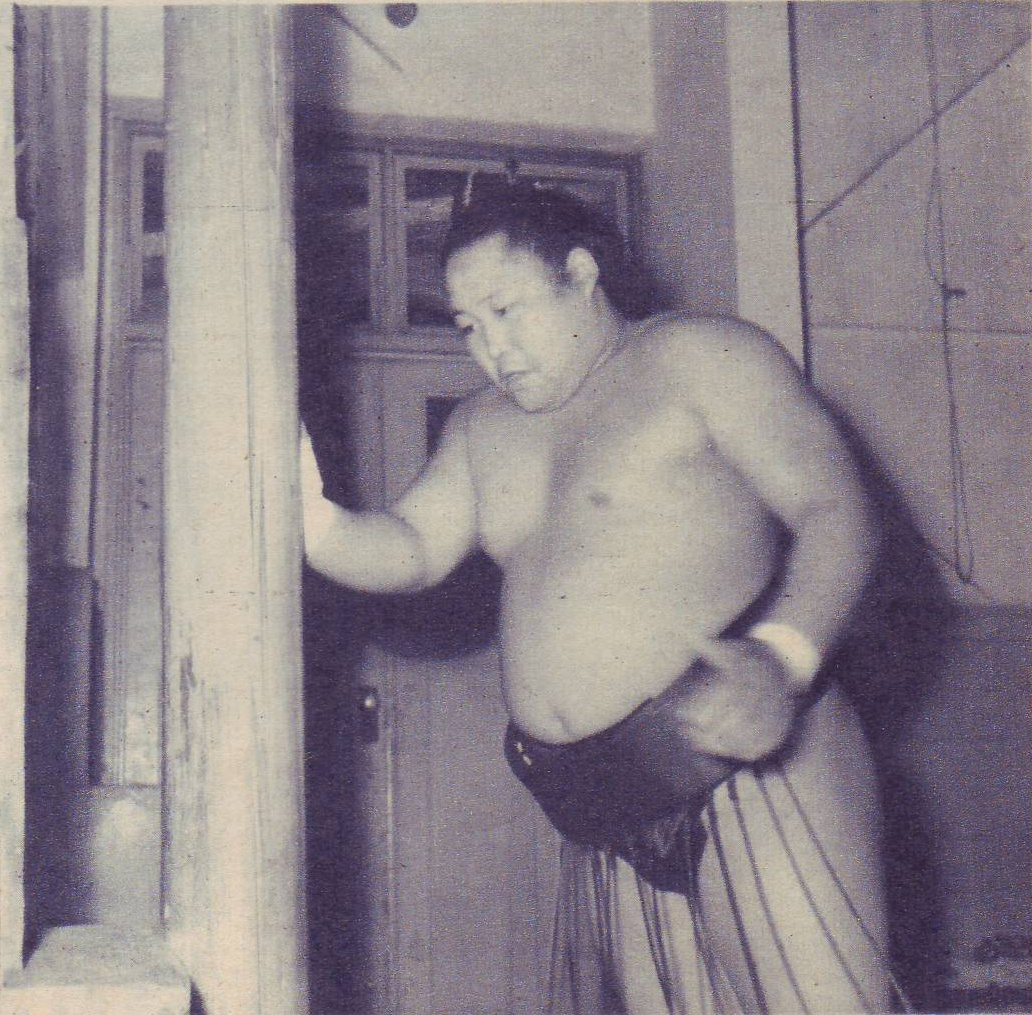

Personal information
- Native name: 前田川 克郎
- Born: Katsuro Takahashi; February 9, 1939 Esashi, Iwate, Japan
- Died: November 4, 1998 (aged 59)
- Height: 1.70 m (5 ft 7 in)
- Weight: 117 kg (258 lb; 18.4 st)

Sport
- Sport: Sumo
- Retired: May, 1967
- Heya: Takasago
- Record: 445-480-0
- Debut: September, 1952
- Highest rank: Sekiwake (July, 1961)
- Special Prizes: Fighting Spirit (2); Technique (1)
- Gold Stars: 1 (Taihō)
- Updated on Sep. 2012

Maedagawa Katsu (born Katsuro Takahashi; February 9, 1939 – November 4, 1998) was a sumo wrestler from Esashi, Iwate, Japan. He made his professional debut in September 1952, and reached the top division in November 1960. His highest rank was sekiwake. He retired from active competition in May 1967.

== Career record ==
- The Kyushu tournament was first held in 1957, and the Nagoya tournament in 1958.

Maedagawa Katsu
Year	January Hatsu basho, Tokyo	March Haru basho, Osaka	May Natsu basho, Tokyo	July Nagoya basho, Nagoya	September Aki basho, Tokyo	November Kyūshū basho, Fukuoka
1952	x	x	x	x	(Maezumo)	Not held
1953	West Jonokuchi #14; 2–7	East Jonidan #45; 3–5	East Jonidan #48; 2–6	Not held	East Jonidan #51; 4–4	Not held
1954	West Jonidan #41; 4–4	East Jonidan #23; 5–3	West Jonidan #4; 2–6	Not held	West Jonidan #12; 6–2	Not held
1955	East Sandanme #62; 6–2	East Sandanme #34; 3–5	West Sandanme #36; 5–3	Not held	East Sandanme #14; 6–2	Not held
1956	West Makushita #57; 7–1	West Makushita #32; 1–7	East Makushita #44; 6–2	Not held	East Makushita #35; 4–4	Not held
1957	East Makushita #33; 5–3	East Makushita #25; 2–6	West Makushita #33; 5–3	Not held	East Makushita #27; 6–2	West Makushita #18; 3–5
1958	East Makushita #24; 3–5	East Makushita #28; 1–7	East Makushita #45; 2–6	East Makushita #54; 3–5	West Makushita #62; 5–3	East Makushita #52; 4–4
1959	West Makushita #50; 4–4	West Makushita #50; 6–2	East Makushita #35; 4–4	East Makushita #34; 7–1–P	West Makushita #17; 5–3	West Makushita #12; 6–2
1960	West Makushita #7; 7–1	East Jūryō #18; 8–7	East Jūryō #13; 9–6	East Jūryō #9; 9–6	East Jūryō #4; 12–3–P	East Maegashira #14; 9–6
1961	West Maegashira #6; 5–10	West Maegashira #8; 12–3; F	East Maegashira #1; 9–6	West Sekiwake #1; 7–8	East Komusubi #2; 2–13	West Maegashira #7; 8–7
1962	East Maegashira #6; 5–10	East Maegashira #12; 9–6	East Maegashira #3; 10–5	West Sekiwake #1; 6–9	East Maegashira #1; 4–11	East Maegashira #8; 7–8
1963	East Maegashira #10; 7–8	West Maegashira #10; 6–9	East Maegashira #12; 10–5	West Maegashira #5; 3–12	West Maegashira #12; 9–6	West Maegashira #5; 8–7
1964	East Maegashira #2; 4–11	West Maegashira #8; 11–4	West Maegashira #2; 3–12 ★	West Maegashira #8; 8–7	East Maegashira #6; 9–6; T	West Komusubi #1; 2–13
1965	West Maegashira #6; 6–9	East Maegashira #8; 6–9	West Maegashira #9; 11–4; F	West Maegashira #2; 2–13	East Maegashira #10; 5–10	West Maegashira #14; 1–14
1966	East Jūryō #8; 5–10	West Jūryō #13; 7–8	East Jūryō #15; 10–5	West Jūryō #7; 7–8	East Jūryō #8; 5–10	West Jūryō #17; 8–7
1967	East Jūryō #12; 6–9	East Jūryō #15; 6–9	West Makushita #1; Retired; 2–5–0	x	x	x
Record given as wins–losses–absences Top division champion Top division runner-up Retired Lower divisions Non-participation Sanshō key: F=Fighting spirit; O=Outstanding performance; T=Technique Also shown: ★=Kinboshi; P=Playoff(s); Divisions: Makuuchi — Jūryō — Makushita — Sandanme — Jonidan — Jonokuchi Makuuchi ranks: Yokozuna — Ōzeki — Sekiwake — Komusubi — Maegashira

== See also ==
- Glossary of sumo terms
- List of past sumo wrestlers
- List of sekiwake
- List of sumo tournament top division runners-up
