= Wakasugiyama Toyoichi =

Japanese sumo wrestler (1933–1999)

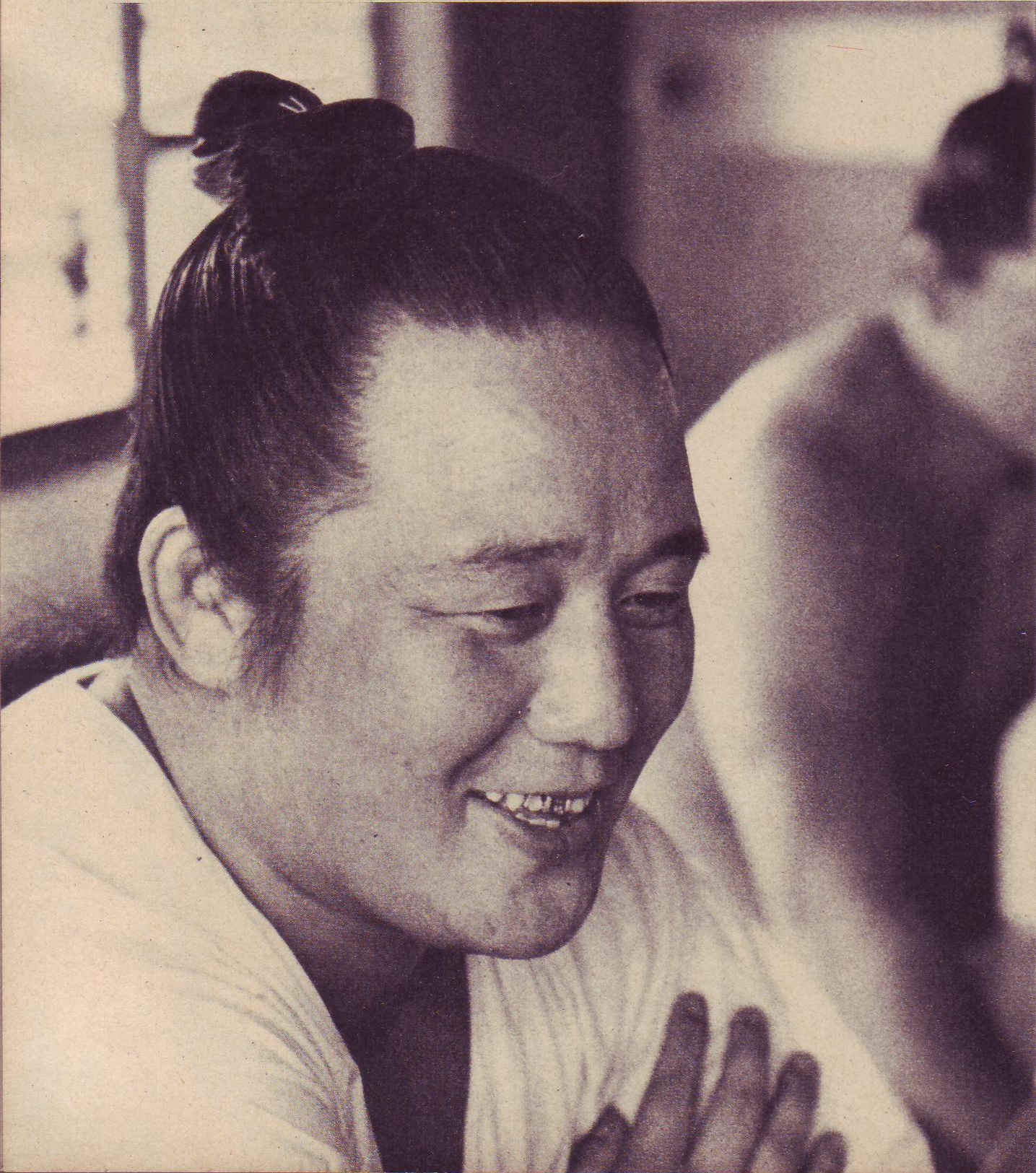

Personal information
- Native name: 若杉山 豊一
- Born: Toyoichi Kumamoto; January 24, 1933 Shime, Fukuoka, Japan
- Died: November 4, 1999 (aged 66)
- Height: 1.77 m (5 ft 9 1/2 in)
- Weight: 120 kg (260 lb; 19 st)

Sport
- Sport: Sumo
- Retired: May, 1967
- Heya: Tokitsukaze
- Record: 496-495-4
- Debut: March, 1953
- Highest rank: Maegashira 1 (March, 1965)
- Championships: 1 (Jūryō)
- Special Prizes: Fighting Spirit (1)
- Gold Stars: 1 (Tochinoumi)
- Updated on Sep. 2012

Wakasugiyama Toyoichi (born Toyoichi Kumamoto; January 24, 1933 – November 4, 1999) was a sumo wrestler from Shime, Fukuoka, Japan. He made his professional debut in March 1953, and reached the top division in March 1959. His highest rank was maegashira 1. He left the sumo world upon retirement from active competition in May 1967.

== Career record ==
- The Kyushu tournament was first held in 1957, and the Nagoya tournament in 1958.

Wakasugiyama Toyoichi
Year	January Hatsu basho, Tokyo	March Haru basho, Osaka	May Natsu basho, Tokyo	July Nagoya basho, Nagoya	September Aki basho, Tokyo	November Kyūshū basho, Fukuoka
1953	x	Shinjo; 3–0	East Jonidan #26; 7–1–P	Not held	East Sandanme #58; 6–2	Not held
1954	East Sandanme #40; 4–4	East Sandanme #32; 4–4	East Sandanme #28; 6–2	Not held	East Sandanme #8; 4–4	Not held
1955	East Sandanme #3; 3–5	West Sandanme #6; 3–5	West Sandanme #8; 4–4	Not held	East Sandanme #3; 7–1	Not held
1956	West Makushita #45; 6–2	East Makushita #32; 4–4	West Makushita #31; 4–4	Not held	West Makushita #31; 3–5	Not held
1957	West Makushita #35; 5–3	West Makushita #26; 6–2	West Makushita #13; 6–2	Not held	West Makushita #3; 3–5	West Makushita #6; 6–2
1958	East Makushita #3; 6–2	East Jūryō #23; 10–5	East Jūryō #17; 10–5	East Jūryō #10; 9–6	East Jūryō #7; 9–6	West Jūryō #3; 5–10
1959	East Jūryō #8; 12–3–P; Champion	East Maegashira #20; 8–7	West Maegashira #17; 7–8	East Maegashira #18; 10–5	West Maegashira #11; 5–10	East Maegashira #15; 3–12
1960	East Jūryō #5; 6–9	East Jūryō #7; 10–5	West Jūryō #1; 9–6	East Maegashira #14; 8–7	West Maegashira #8; 5–10	West Maegashira #13; 8–7
1961	West Maegashira #10; 7–8	West Maegashira #10; 7–8	West Maegashira #10; 5–10	West Maegashira #14; 6–9	West Jūryō #2; 7–8	East Jūryō #4; 6–9
1962	West Jūryō #8; 6–9	East Jūryō #11; 7–4–4	West Jūryō #12; 7–8	West Jūryō #13; 9–6	West Jūryō #9; 9–6	East Jūryō #4; 9–6
1963	East Jūryō #1; 5–10	East Jūryō #6; 10–5	East Jūryō #3; 7–8	East Jūryō #4; 5–10	West Jūryō #9; 6–9	East Jūryō #12; 6–9
1964	West Jūryō #16; 9–6	West Jūryō #7; 9–6	West Jūryō #5; 7–8	East Jūryō #7; 8–7	East Jūryō #5; 10–5	East Jūryō #2; 10–5
1965	West Maegashira #13; 12–3; F	West Maegashira #1; 5–10 ★	West Maegashira #4; 2–13	West Maegashira #11; 9–6	West Maegashira #7; 5–10	East Maegashira #12; 8–7
1966	East Maegashira #11; 2–13	West Jūryō #3; 8–7	West Jūryō #2; 9–6	East Maegashira #15; 4–11	West Jūryō #2; 10–5	West Maegashira #13; 2–13
1967	West Jūryō #6; 4–11	West Jūryō #14; 4–11	East Makushita #8; Retired; 1–6–0	x	x	x
Record given as wins–losses–absences Top division champion Top division runner-up Retired Lower divisions Non-participation Sanshō key: F=Fighting spirit; O=Outstanding performance; T=Technique Also shown: ★=Kinboshi; P=Playoff(s); Divisions: Makuuchi — Jūryō — Makushita — Sandanme — Jonidan — Jonokuchi Makuuchi ranks: Yokozuna — Ōzeki — Sekiwake — Komusubi — Maegashira

== See also ==
- Glossary of sumo terms
- List of past sumo wrestlers
- List of sumo tournament top division runners-up
- List of sumo tournament second division champions
