= Wakahaguro Tomoaki =

Japanese sumo wrestler (1934–1969)

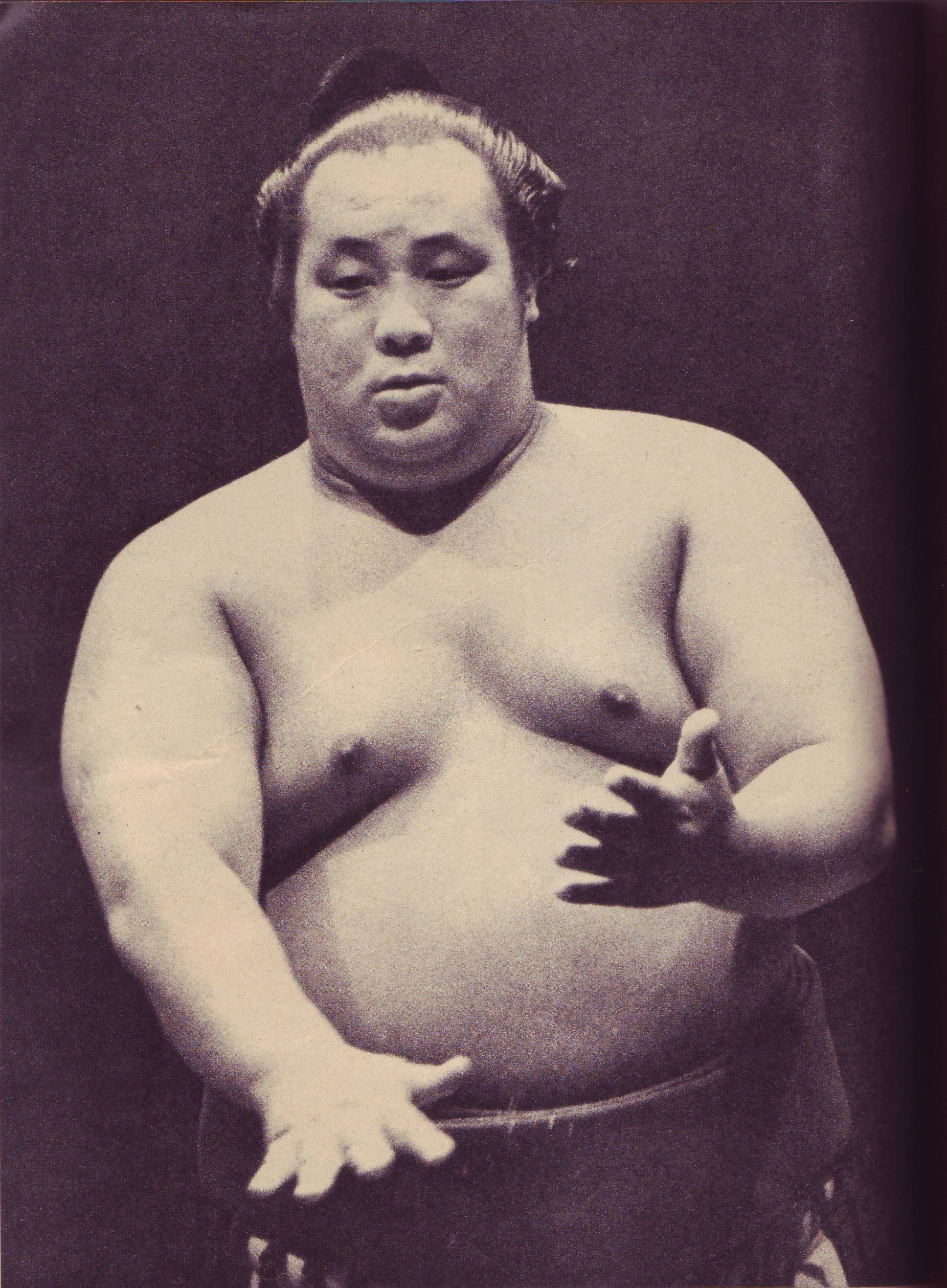

Personal information
- Native name: 若羽黒 朋明
- Born: Tomoaki Kusabuka; 25 November 1934 Naka-ku, Yokohama, Kanagawa, Japan
- Died: 2 March 1969 (aged 34)
- Height: 1.76 m (5 ft 9 1/2 in)
- Weight: 150 kg (330 lb)

Sport
- Sport: Sumo
- Retired: March, 1965
- Heya: Tatsunami
- Record: 555–480–40
- Debut: October, 1949
- Highest rank: Ōzeki (November, 1959)
- Championships: 1 (Makuuchi)
- Special Prizes: Outstanding Performance (1); Fighting Spirit (1); Technique (2)
- Gold Stars: 4 Yoshibayama (3); Tochinishiki
- Updated on August 2012

Wakahaguro Tomoaki (25 November 1934 – 2 March 1969) was a sumo wrestler from Naka, Yokohama, Kanagawa, Japan. His highest rank was ōzeki.

== Career ==
A former swimming champion while at junior high school, Wakahaguro made his professional debut in October 1949, joining Tatsunami stable. To meet the weight requirement, he had to drink an enormous amount of water prior to his physical. However, he was able to put on more weight as he moved up the ranks. He reached the second highest jūryō division in March 1954 and was promoted to the top makuuchi division in March 1955. His first big success in a tournament came in March 1956 when he won 12 out of 15 bouts and took part in a three way playoff for the championship with ōzeki Wakanohana and sekiwake Asashio, the first of its kind in makuuchi. Although he then lost to both each, he was still awarded the Fighting Spirit prize. After three years of steady progress he worked his way up to sekiwake rank and in the September 1959 tournament was runner-up once again. This performance earned him promotion to ōzeki. In his ōzeki debut he took the tournament championship with a 13–2 record, the first ōzeki debutant to do so since Chiyonoyama ten years earlier. After the tournament a party was held at the Imperial Hotel to celebrate both his ōzeki promotion and his engagement.

Wakahaguro was expected to quickly push on to yokozuna promotion, but his second tournament as an ōzeki ended with an extremely disappointing 7–8 record. After this it was clear that Wakahaguro had neither the consistency nor the determination to reach sumo's highest rank, and he was to be overtaken by two younger rivals, Taihō and Kashiwado. In November 1960 Wakahaguro managed to defeat Taihō for the first time in five attempts but could not prevent him from winning his first championship. Wakahaguro's 12–3 runner-up performance was the last time he was able to challenge for a tournament title. In January 1961 it was Kashiwado's turn to win his first championship, and Wakahaguro could produce only a 10–5 score. After a poor 5–10 record in July 1961 he missed the September tournament through injury. In November 1961, the same tournament in which both Taihō and Kashiwado made their yokozuna debuts, Wakahaguro lost his ōzeki rank after managing only a 5–10 record on his comeback. The rules in place at the time meant three consecutive make-koshi or losing scores would result in demotion, and his absences in September were counted as losses.

== Retirement from sumo ==
Wakahaguro spent the last three years of his career in the maegashira ranks, but he was beset by personal problems, including a gambling addiction. He retired in March 1965 and left the sumo world completely as he had no elder stock in the Japan Sumo Association and the regulation allowing a former ōzeki to stay under their fighting names for a grace period did not exist at the time. Heavily in debt, he was further disgraced in May 1965 after being caught attempting to sell smuggled handguns to gangsters, which he had acquired in Los Angeles whilst on an overseas tour. He was tried, convicted and given an 18-month suspended prison sentence. A formal retirement ceremony was impossible in such circumstances so a private one was done quietly at a hotel in Miura city.

== Death ==
Divorced from his wife and separated from his children, Wakahaguro spent his last years working at a sumo fan's restaurant in Okayama city. He died suddenly of a stroke at the age of 34.

== Fighting style ==
Wakahaguro was an oshi-sumo specialist, for which his distinctive round, fleshy body type or anko-gata was ideally suited. He won over 40 percent of his matches by a straightforward oshi-dashi, or push out.

== Pre-modern top division record ==
- The New Year tournament began and the Spring tournament returned to Osaka in 1953.

Wakahaguro Tomoaki
-	Spring Haru basho, Tokyo	Summer Natsu basho, Tokyo	Autumn Aki basho, Tokyo
1949	x	x	(Maezumo)
1950	West Jonokuchi #6; 5–10	West Jonidan #20; 4–11	West Jonidan #16; 8–7
1951	West Jonidan #9; 9–6	East Sandanme #27; 6–9	East Sandanme #34; 9–6
1952	West Sandanme #11; 5–3	West Makushita #35; 9–6	West Makushita #26; 6–5–4
Record given as wins–losses–absences Top division champion Top division runner-up Retired Lower divisions Non-participation Sanshō key: F=Fighting spirit; O=Outstanding performance; T=Technique Also shown: ★=Kinboshi; P=Playoff(s); Divisions: Makuuchi — Jūryō — Makushita — Sandanme — Jonidan — Jonokuchi Makuuchi ranks: Yokozuna — Ōzeki — Sekiwake — Komusubi — Maegashira

-	New Year Hatsu basho, Tokyo	Spring Haru basho, Osaka	Summer Natsu basho, Tokyo	Autumn Aki basho, Tokyo
1953	West Makushita #23; 10–5	East Makushita #12; 5–3	West Makushita #9; 7–1	West Makushita #3; 4–4
1954	East Makushita #3; 6–2	West Jūryō #16; 8–7	West Jūryō #15; 9–6	East Jūryō #10; 11–4
1955	West Jūryō #4; 11–4–P	East Maegashira #19; 7–8	West Maegashira #20; 7–8	West Maegashira #21; 11–4
1956	East Maegashira #12; 6–9	East Maegashira #15; 12–3–PP; F	West Maegashira #2; 8–7 ★★	East Maegashira #1; 9–6; T★
Record given as wins–losses–absences Top division champion Top division runner-up Retired Lower divisions Non-participation Sanshō key: F=Fighting spirit; O=Outstanding performance; T=Technique Also shown: ★=Kinboshi; P=Playoff(s); Divisions: Makuuchi — Jūryō — Makushita — Sandanme — Jonidan — Jonokuchi Makuuchi ranks: Yokozuna — Ōzeki — Sekiwake — Komusubi — Maegashira

== Top division record ==
- The Kyushu tournament was first held in 1957, and the Nagoya tournament in 1958.

Wakahaguro Tomoaki
Year	January Hatsu basho, Tokyo	March Haru basho, Osaka	May Natsu basho, Tokyo	July Nagoya basho, Nagoya	September Aki basho, Tokyo	November Kyūshū basho, Fukuoka
1957	West Komusubi #1; 6–9	East Maegashira #2; 9–6 ★	West Sekiwake #2; 7–8	Not held	West Komusubi #1; 8–7	East Komusubi #1; 9–6; O
1958	East Sekiwake #2; 8–7	West Sekiwake #1; 6–9	East Maegashira #1; 6–9	West Maegashira #3; 8–7	West Komusubi #1; 9–6	West Sekiwake #1; 5–10
1959	West Maegashira #1; 10–5	East Komusubi #1; 10–5	East Sekiwake #1; 7–8	West Komusubi #1; 11–4	West Sekiwake #2; 12–3; T	East Ōzeki #1; 13–2
1960	East Ōzeki #1; 7–8	West Ōzeki #1; 8–7	West Ōzeki #1; 10–5	East Ōzeki #1; 7–8	East Ōzeki #2; 8–7	West Ōzeki #1; 12–3
1961	East Ōzeki #1; 10–5	East Ōzeki #2; 9–6	West Ōzeki #2; 8–7	West Ōzeki #2; 5–10	West Ōzeki #2; Sat out due to injury 0–0–15	East Ōzeki #2; 5–10
1962	West Sekiwake #2; 9–6	West Sekiwake #2; 10–5	East Sekiwake #1; 8–7	East Sekiwake #1; 3–6–6	West Maegashira #6; 4–11	West Maegashira #11; 8–7
1963	West Maegashira #8; 9–6	East Maegashira #2; 6–9	West Maegashira #4; 9–6	East Maegashira #1; 2–13	West Maegashira #11; 9–6	East Maegashira #5; 6–9
1964	East Maegashira #8; 7–8	East Maegashira #9; 4–11	West Maegashira #14; 8–7	East Maegashira #12; 8–7	East Maegashira #9; 8–7	West Maegashira #7; 6–9
1965	East Maegashira #10; 6–9	West Maegashira #13; Retired; 0–0	x	x	x	x
Record given as wins–losses–absences Top division champion Top division runner-up Retired Lower divisions Non-participation Sanshō key: F=Fighting spirit; O=Outstanding performance; T=Technique Also shown: ★=Kinboshi; P=Playoff(s); Divisions: Makuuchi — Jūryō — Makushita — Sandanme — Jonidan — Jonokuchi Makuuchi ranks: Yokozuna — Ōzeki — Sekiwake — Komusubi — Maegashira

== See also ==
- Glossary of sumo terms
- List of past sumo wrestlers
- List of sumo tournament top division champions
- List of sumo tournament top division runners-up
- List of ōzeki
