= Masuiyama Daishirō =

Masuiyama Daishirō may refer to:

- Masuiyama Daishirō I (1919–1985), sumo wrestler
- Masuiyama Daishirō II (1948–2025), also sumo wrestler and son of Masuiyama Daishirō I
