= Wakasugiyama (Fukuoka) =

Mountain in Fukuoka Prefecture, Japan

- 若杉山
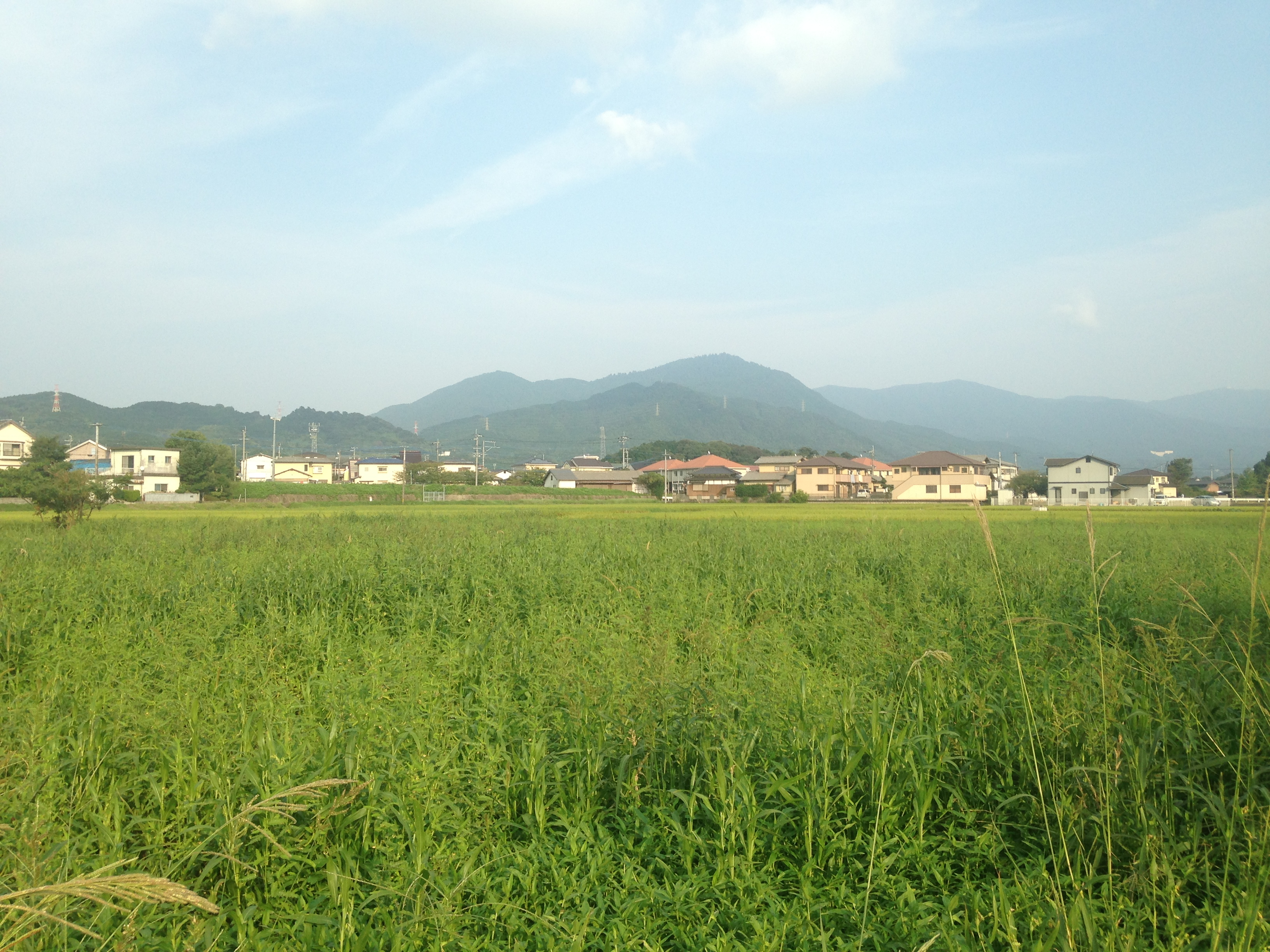
- Mount Wakasugiyama from Sakado Station

Highest point
- Elevation: 681 m (2,234 ft)
- Prominence: 184 m (604 ft)
- Coordinates: 33°35′52″N 130°32′41″E

Geography
- Location: Fukuoka Prefecture, Japan
- Parent range: Kyushu Mountains

Wakasugiyama (若杉山) is a mountain located in Fukuoka Prefecture, Japan. It is part of the Kyushu Mountains.
