= Mount Wakasugi =

Mountain in Tottori Prefecture, Japan

- 若杉山

Highest point
- Elevation: 1,020 m (3,350 ft)
- Prominence: 142 m (466 ft)
- Coordinates: 35°16′54″N 133°50′15″E

Geography
- Location: Misasa, Tottori, Japan
- Parent range: Chūgoku Mountains

Mount Wakasugi (若杉山, Wakasugiyama) is a mountain located in Misasa, Tottori, Japan. It is one of the 100 Famous Mountains of Chūgoku.
