= Shimizugawa Motokichi =

Japanese sumo wrestler (1900–1967)

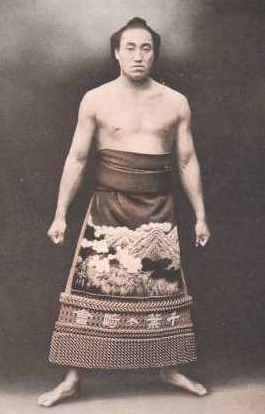

Personal information
- Native name: 清水川 元吉
- Born: 長尾 与楽 (Nagao Yonesaku); 13 January 1900 Goshogawara, Aomori, Japan
- Died: 5 July 1967 (aged 67) Tokyo, Japan
- Height: 1.77 m (5 ft 9 1/2 in)
- Weight: 97 kg (214 lb)

Sport
- Sport: Sumo
- Retired: May 1937
- Heya: Hatachiyama
- Record: 272-157-48-1draw-8holds
- Debut: January 1917
- Highest rank: Ōzeki (May 1932)
- Elder name: Oitekaze
- Championships: 3 (Makuuchi); 2 (Jūryō)
- Updated on June 2020

Shimizugawa Motokichi (清水川 元吉, Shimizugawa Motokichi; 13 January 1900 – 5 July 1967) was a Japanese sumo wrestler from Goshogawara, Aomori, Japan. His highest rank was ōzeki.

== Career ==
Making his debut in January 1917, he was promoted to the top makuuchi division in January 1923 and made the fourth komusubi rank in January 1926, although he did not take part in that tournament. He competed in the maegashira ranks in 1927 but left the Japan Sumo Association temporarily and was not listed on the banzuke ranking sheets in the March and May 1928 tournaments. Returning in October 1928 he was listed at the bottom of the jūryō division and after winning two jūryō tournament titles he returned to the top division in 1930.

Shimizugawa was promoted to the second highest rank of ōzeki in 1932 but never made the highest yokozuna rank, despite winning a total of three top division tournament championships. He was overlooked for promotion while two men with inferior records to him, Musashiyama and Minanogawa, were both promoted to yokozuna instead. It has been suggested that this was because Shimizugawa belonged to a small stable, Hatachiyama, whereas Musashiyama and Minanogawa were both members of much larger and more influential stables (Dewanoumi and Takasago, respectively).

== Retirement from sumo ==
After finishing as runner-up in the May 1937 tournament, his fifth runner-up performance, Shimizugawa announced his retirement. He remained in the sumo world as an elder under the name Oitekaze Oyakata, and was head coach of the Oitekaze stable. Among the wrestlers he produced was a komusubi to whom he gave his old shikona or fighting name, Shimizugawa Akio.

== Career Record ==
- In 1927 Tokyo and Osaka sumo merged and four tournaments a year in Tokyo and other locations began to be held.

Shimizugawa Motokichi
-	Spring	Summer
1917	(Maezumo)	(Maezumo)
1918	East Jonokuchi #25; 3–2	East Jonidan #70; 4–1
1919	West Jonidan #17; 3–1; 1h	East Sandanme #32; 4–1
1920	West Sandanme #3; 4–1	East Makushita #28; 2–2; 1h
1921	East Makushita #26; 3–1; 1h	East Makushita #19; 3–1; 1h
1922	East Jūryō #13; 2–1; 2h	West Jūryō #3; 4–3
1923	West Maegashira #15; 2–7; 1h	East Jūryō #4; 6–3
1924	West Maegashira #13; 4–5; 1h	West Maegashira #12; 4–7
1925	West Maegashira #15; 8–3	East Maegashira #5; 8–2–1; 1d
1926	East Komusubi #1; 0–0–11	West Maegashira #4; 8–3
Record given as wins–losses–absences Top division champion Top division runner-up Retired Lower divisions Non-participation Sanshō key: F=Fighting spirit; O=Outstanding performance; T=Technique Also shown: ★=Kinboshi; P=Playoff(s); Divisions: Makuuchi — Jūryō — Makushita — Sandanme — Jonidan — Jonokuchi Makuuchi ranks: Yokozuna — Ōzeki — Sekiwake — Komusubi — Maegashira

-	Spring Haru basho, Tokyo	March Sangatsu basho, varied	Summer Natsu basho, Tokyo	October Jūgatsu basho, varied
1927	East Maegashira #1; 3–8	East Maegashira #1; 3–8	West Maegashira #7; 0–0–11	East Maegashira #5; 0–0–11
1928	East Maegashira #12; 0–0–11	Left JSA	Left JSA	Makushita #1; 4–3
1929	East Jūryō #12; 8–3	East Jūryō #12; 10–1; Champion	West Jūryō #1; 11–0; Champion	West Jūryō #1; 8–3
1930	East Maegashira #8; 6–5	East Maegashira #8; 7–4	West Maegashira #3; 3–8	West Maegashira #3; 9–2
1931	East Komusubi #1; 5–6	East Komusubi #1; 4–7	West Maegashira #3; 10–1	West Maegashira #3; 6–5
1932	West Sekiwake #1; 8–0	West Sekiwake #1; 8–2	East Ōzeki #2; 10–1	East Ōzeki #2; 9–2
Record given as wins–losses–absences Top division champion Top division runner-up Retired Lower divisions Non-participation Sanshō key: F=Fighting spirit; O=Outstanding performance; T=Technique Also shown: ★=Kinboshi; P=Playoff(s); Divisions: Makuuchi — Jūryō — Makushita — Sandanme — Jonidan — Jonokuchi Makuuchi ranks: Yokozuna — Ōzeki — Sekiwake — Komusubi — Maegashira

-	Spring Haru basho, Tokyo	Summer Natsu basho, Tokyo	Autumn Aki basho, Tokyo
1933	East Ōzeki #1; 5–6	West Ōzeki #1; 7–4	Not held
1934	West Ōzeki #1; 7–4	West Ōzeki #1; 11–0	Not held
1935	East Ōzeki #1; 5–6	West Ōzeki #2; 7–4	Not held
1936	West Ōzeki #1; 4–7	West Ōzeki #1; 6–5	Not held
1937	West Ōzeki #1; 6–5	West Ōzeki #1; 10–3	Retired –
Record given as win-loss-absent Top Division Champion Top Division Runner-up Retired Lower Divisions Key:d=Draw(s) (引分); h=Hold(s) (預り); Divisions: Makuuchi — Jūryō — Makushita — Sandanme — Jonidan — Jonokuchi Makuuchi ranks: Yokozuna — Ōzeki — Sekiwake — Komusubi — Maegashira

*Shimizugawa was runner-up in his final tournament in May 1937

== See also ==
- Glossary of sumo terms
- List of sumo tournament top division champions
- List of past sumo wrestlers
- List of ōzeki
