= Kongō Masahiro =

Japanese sumo wrestler (1948–2014)

Personal information
- Native name: 金剛 正裕
- Born: Masahiro Yoshizawa; November 18, 1948 Hokkaidō, Japan
- Died: August 12, 2014 (aged 65)
- Height: 1.84 m (6 ft 1/2 in)
- Weight: 116 kg (256 lb)

Sport
- Sport: Sumo
- Retired: September, 1976
- Heya: Nishonoseki
- Record: 449–414–0
- Debut: May, 1964
- Highest rank: Sekiwake (September, 1975)
- Elder name: Nishonoseki
- Championships: 1 (Makuuchi); 2 (Jūryō); 1 (Makushita); 1 (Jonokuchi)
- Special Prizes: Outstanding Performance (3)
- Gold Stars: 3 (Kitanoumi)
- Updated on June 2020

Kongō Masahiro (18 November 1948 - 12 August 2014) was a former sumo wrestler from Hokkaidō, Japan. His highest rank was sekiwake and he won a top division tournament championship in 1975. He was a sumo coach and head of the Nishonoseki stable from 1976 until 2013.

== Career ==
He was born in Fukagawa as Masahiro Yoshizawa, and joined the Nishonoseki stable (home of the great Taihō) in May 1964 at the age of 15. He initially wrestled under the shikona of Oyoshizawa, based on his own surname. He first appeared on the banzuke ranking sheets in July 1964 and won all seven of his bouts, taking the jonokuchi championship with a perfect 7–0 record. However his progress slowed somewhat after that. In 1966 he made the third makushita division, and gradually climbed up to makushita 3 before dropping to makushita 6 for the July 1969 tournament. There he took his second divisional championship, again with an unbeaten 7–0 score, and was promoted to the second jūryō division, giving him elite sekitori status. He was relatively light for a sumo wrestler at just 82 kg (181 lb). To mark his promotion he was given the new name of Kongō. He remained in the jūryō division for just over a year, recording a couple of make-koshi or losing scores, but in May and July 1970 he won two consecutive jūryō championships to earn promotion to the top makuuchi division.

He had put on a little more weight, and was now around 100 kg (220 lb), but he remained in the maegashira ranks until May 1972, when a 9–6 score saw him reach the titled san'yaku ranks for the first time at komusubi. He was unable to maintain the rank however, scoring only 5–10. In September 1974 he defeated yokozuna Kitanoumi on the opening day, earning him his first kinboshi or gold star, and at the end of the tournament he was awarded his first sanshō or special prize for Outstanding Performance. He returned to komusubi for the following tournament.

The highlight of his career came in July 1975 when he won the top division championship from the maegashira 1 ranking. Yokozuna Wajima and ōzeki Takanohana both missed the tournament through injury. Kongō defeated Kitanoumi once again on the 7th day and finished one win ahead of fellow maegashira Aobajō with a fine 13–2 record. He won his third Outstanding Performance prize and was promoted straight to sekiwake for the following tournament. This was to be his highest rank, as he could score only 6–9 in the September 1975 tournament and never managed to return to sekiwake.

== Retirement from sumo ==
In 1975 Kongō's stablemaster, former ōzeki Saganohana, died and his widow asked Kongō to marry her second daughter and take over the running of Nishonoseki stable. Kongō agreed and he retired from active competition in 1976 at the age of 27. However, before the marriage could be officially registered, the daughter ran out on Kongō and so the widow adopted him as her foster son instead. and he changed his name to Masahiro Kitamura. Veteran Kirinji, already in the top division when Kongō took over, remained active until 1988, and Kongō produced several other sekitori, such as Hōō, Daitetsu and Daizen. However, with the stablemaster in poor health it went into a gradual decline. Kongō was hospitalized following a stroke in October 2012. In January 2013, the stable's three remaining wrestlers retired and the stable was closed. Kongō himself retired from the Sumo Association in June 2013.

== Death ==
He died of pneumonia on August 12, 2014.

== Career record ==
Kongō Masahiro
Year	January Hatsu basho, Tokyo	March Haru basho, Osaka	May Natsu basho, Tokyo	July Nagoya basho, Nagoya	September Aki basho, Tokyo	November Kyūshū basho, Fukuoka
1964	x	x	(Maezumo)	East Jonokuchi #12; 7–0; Champion	East Jonidan #11; 3–4	East Jonidan #21; 5–2
1965	East Sandanme #81; 3–4	East Jonidan #1; 3–4	West Jonidan #9; 6–1	East Sandanme #49; 5–2	East Sandanme #17; 4–3	East Sandanme #1; 3–4
1966	West Sandanme #10; 5–2	East Makushita #82; 5–2	West Makushita #61; 4–3	East Makushita #54; 4–3	East Makushita #48; 2–5	East Makushita #66; 6–1
1967	West Makushita #35; 4–3	East Makushita #28; 2–5	East Makushita #55; 5–2	East Makushita #32; 4–3	West Makushita #24; 4–3	West Makushita #18; 2–5
1968	East Makushita #33; 4–3	East Makushita #24; 3–4	East Makushita #29; 6–1	East Makushita #12; 5–2	West Makushita #5; 4–3	East Makushita #4; 4–3
1969	East Makushita #3; 3–4	East Makushita #6; 7–0; Champion	East Jūryō #10; 9–6	East Jūryō #5; 7–8	West Jūryō #6; 5–10	West Jūryō #12; 10–5
1970	West Jūryō #5; 7–8	East Jūryō #7; 6–9	East Jūryō #11; 12–3; Champion	West Jūryō #3; 12–3; Champion	West Maegashira #9; 7–8	East Maegashira #11; 9–6
1971	East Maegashira #6; 6–9	East Maegashira #9; 8–7	East Maegashira #7; 7–8	East Maegashira #9; 8–7	East Maegashira #7; 8–7	East Maegashira #4; 5–10
1972	East Maegashira #7; 8–7	West Maegashira #5; 8–7	East Maegashira #1; 9–6	East Komusubi #1; 5–10	West Maegashira #2; 9–6	East Komusubi #1; 5–10
1973	West Maegashira #4; 5–10	East Maegashira #9; 8–7	West Maegashira #7; 8–7	East Maegashira #3; 5–10	West Maegashira #8; 9–6	West Maegashira #4; 5–10
1974	West Maegashira #6; 10–5	West Komusubi #1; 4–11	East Maegashira #6; 8–7	East Maegashira #2; 8–7	East Maegashira #1; 9–6; O★	East Komusubi #1; 8–7
1975	East Komusubi #1; 4–11	West Maegashira #6; 6–9	West Maegashira #9; 10–5; O	West Maegashira #1; 13–2; O★	West Sekiwake #1; 6–9	East Maegashira #2; 7–8
1976	West Maegashira #3; 4–11 ★	West Maegashira #10; 8–7	East Maegashira #7; 9–6	East Maegashira #2; 3–12	East Maegashira #11; Retired –	x
Record given as wins–losses–absences Top division champion Top division runner-up Retired Lower divisions Non-participation Sanshō key: F=Fighting spirit; O=Outstanding performance; T=Technique Also shown: ★=Kinboshi; P=Playoff(s); Divisions: Makuuchi — Jūryō — Makushita — Sandanme — Jonidan — Jonokuchi Makuuchi ranks: Yokozuna — Ōzeki — Sekiwake — Komusubi — Maegashira

== See also ==
- Glossary of sumo terms
- List of past sumo wrestlers
- List of sumo tournament top division champions
- List of sumo tournament second division champions
- List of sekiwake
