= Kamikaze Shoichi =

Japanese sumo wrestler (1921–1990)

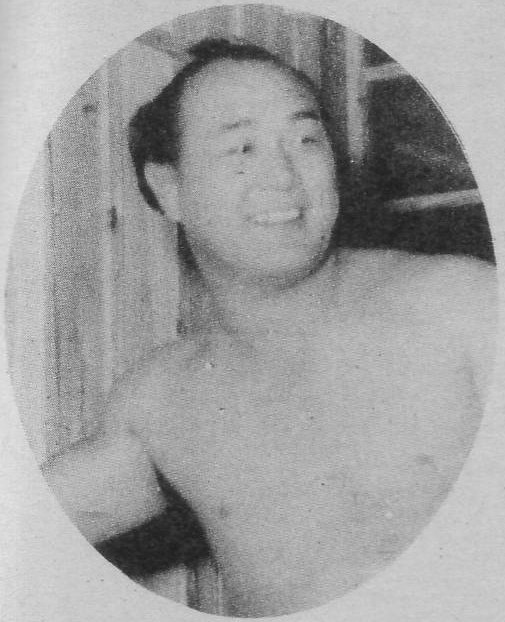

Personal information
- Native name: 神風 正一
- Born: Shoichi Akazawa; October 19, 1921 Higashikagawa, Kagawa Prefecture, Japan
- Died: May 15, 1990 (aged 68)
- Height: 1.79 m (5 ft 10 1/2 in)
- Weight: 98 kg (216 lb; 15 st 6 lb)

Sport
- Sport: Sumo
- Retired: May 1950
- Heya: Nishonoseki
- Record: 172–123–20
- Debut: May 1937
- Highest rank: Sekiwake (November 1944)
- Championships: 1 (Makushita)
- Special Prizes: Technique (1)
- Gold Stars: 6 Akinoumi (2); Azumafuji; Haguroyama; Maedayama; Terukuni
- Updated on May 2013

Kamikaze Shoichi (born Shoichi Akazawa; October 19, 1921 – May 15, 1990) was a sumo wrestler from Higashikagawa, Kagawa Prefecture, Japan. He made his professional debut in May 1937 and reached the top division in May 1942. His highest rank was sekiwake. He won six gold stars against grand champion yokozuna in the course of his career. Upon retirement from active competition he became an elder in the Japan Sumo Association under the name Kataonami. He left the Sumo Association in September 1952.

== Life and career ==
Shoichi joined Nishonoseki stable at the age of 15 years old making his debut in the 1937 Natsu (Summer) Basho and taking the shikona or ring name of Kamikaze meaning divine wind. He would steadily climb the ranks suffering only one make-koshi or losing record and winning the Makushita division yusho on his way to the Juryo division. He would make quick work of the Juryo division spending just two basho there before making his Makuuchi debut.

In the 1942 Haru (Spring) Basho he would make his top division debut at the rank of Maegashira 18. He would do well there finishing with an 11-4 winning record. He would jump up the banzuke to maegashira 6 but could not manage a winning record, finishing 7–8. Despite this he would still rise up the ranks to maegashira 5. This happened fairly often during these times and was due to the fact that East ranked and West ranked wrestlers were treated as two separate groups and if enough wrestlers from one side received bad losing records, other wrestlers from the same side had to be promoted to replace their slot in the rankings for the next tournament even if their records were not much better. Here he would get a 9–6 record which was enough to place him at the top maegashira 1 rank. At this rank he would get his first kinboshi with a win over Yokozuna Akinoumi on day 9 but would finish with just a 5–10 record sending him back down the banzuke.

In the following basho ranked at maegashira 4 he would go 11-4 earning him promotion to the sanyaku ranks. In May 1944 making his sanyaku debut at the rank of Komusubi he would go 8-2 including a win over Yokozuna Terukuni on day 5. For the following basho in November of the same year he would be promoted to the rank of Sekiwake and managed a 5–5 record which would see him demoted. Kamikaze would briefly change his name to Kaizan Taro for the year of 1945. In the summer 1945 tournament in the midst of regular allied bombings, Kaizan had one of his worst top division tournaments of his career. It had been scheduled to be held on the Meiji Shrine grounds in May but had been postponed due to the bombings. The tournament was moved to the Ryōgoku Kokugikan which itself was regularly closed due to the air raids. Under these conditions and with a truncated tournament of only seven days that was closed to the public, Kaizan, at komusubi, could manage just a 2–5 record. he was demoted down to maegashira 4 following this performance. Here he would finish with a 5–5 record and claim his second kinboshi, again from Akinoumi. He would revert to his original shikona of Kamikaze Shoichi following this tournament.

The following year only the Aki (Autumn) Basho was held. Back at the rank of komusubi he would get a 7–6 record and gaining him promotion back to sekiwake. In the following Natsu Basho in 1947 at the rank of Sekiwake he would finish with a score of 7-3 including wins over Ōzeki Maedayama and Shionoumi on days 7 and 8 respectively. The following Basho he would have to pull out on day 6 having just won win over Ōzeki Nayoroiwa to his name. He would see himself a ways down the banzuke in his return the following Basho at maegashira 6 – his lowest ranking since 1942. Here he would post a good 8-3 winning record. At maegashira 1 the following tournament he would get 7–4 record including his third and fourth kinboshi over Yokozuna Maedayama and Terukuni on days 4 and 5 respectively. Shoichi would have a fair start to his 1949 campaign posting 7-5-1 and 8-7 both at komusubi before injury would cause him to pull out midway in the Aki Basho finishing with just a 4-7-4 record. He would come back after this in the 1950 Haru Basho putting up 9–6 record including two kinboshi from Yokozuna Azumafuji and Haguroyama on days 2 and 4 respectively. The 1950 Natsu Basho proved to be his last, after starting with 5 straight loses he would pull out on day 6 and announce his retirement from sumo.

== Retirement from sumo ==
He would stay on as a coach at Nishonoseki stable under the name Kataonami Oyakata. This would last for only a little over two years before in September 1952 retiring from the Japan Sumo Association all together.

== Career record ==
Kamikaze
-	Spring Haru basho, Tokyo	Summer Natsu basho, Tokyo	Autumn Aki basho, Tokyo
1937	x	(Maezumo)	Not held
1938	East Jonokuchi #9; 5–2	East Jonidan #4; 1–4–2	Not held
1939	East Jonidan #20; 5–2	East Sandanme #19; 6–2	Not held
1940	East Makushita #38; 7–1	East Makushita #7; 7–1; Champion	Not held
1941	East Jūryō #7; 9–6	West Jūryō #2; 11–4	Not held
1942	East Maegashira #18; 11–4	East Maegashira #6; 7–8	Not held
1943	West Maegashira #5; 9–6	East Maegashira #1; 5–10 ★	Not held
1944	West Maegashira #4; 11–4	East Komusubi #1; 8–2	East Sekiwake #2; 5–5
1945	Not held	West Komusubi #2; 2–5	West Maegashira #4; 5–5 ★
1946	Not held	Not held	West Komusubi #1; 7–6
1947	Not held	East Sekiwake #1; 7–3	East Sekiwake #1; 1–5–5
1948	Not held	West Maegashira #6; 8–3	East Maegashira #1; 7–4; T★★
1949	East Komusubi #1; 7–5–1	East Komusubi #1; 8–7	West Sekiwake #1; 4–7–4
1950	East Maegashira #2; 9–6 ★★	West Maegashira #1; Retired; 0–6–9	x
Record given as wins–losses–absences Top division champion Top division runner-up Retired Lower divisions Non-participation Sanshō key: F=Fighting spirit; O=Outstanding performance; T=Technique Also shown: ★=Kinboshi; P=Playoff(s); Divisions: Makuuchi — Jūryō — Makushita — Sandanme — Jonidan — Jonokuchi Makuuchi ranks: Yokozuna — Ōzeki — Sekiwake — Komusubi — Maegashira

== See also ==
- Glossary of sumo terms
- List of past sumo wrestlers
- List of sekiwake
