= Oginohana =

Oginohana may refer to:

- Oginohana Masaaki (1935-2006), sumo wrestler
- Oginohana Akikazu (b.1967), also a sumo wrestler, son of the former
