= Kazuto =

- Gender: Male

Origin
- Origin: Japanese
- Meaning: Different meanings depending on the kanji used

Kazuto (written: 一翔, 一人, 一登, 一仁, 一斗, 一刀, 和人, 麗斗 or カズト in katakana) is a masculine Japanese given name. Notable people with the name include:

- Kazuto (カズト), Japanese guitarist, member of the rock band High and Mighty Color
- Kazuto Doi (土居 一斗; born 1992), Japanese sailor
- Kazuto Ioka (井岡 一翔; born 1989), Japanese boxer
- Kazuto Kushida (櫛田 一斗; born 1987), Japanese footballer
- Kazuto Nakazawa (中澤 一登; born 1968), Japanese animator, character designer and anime director
- Ryūkōzan Kazuto (龍興山 一人; 1967–1990), Japanese sumo wrestler
- Kazuto Sakamoto (阪本 一仁; born 1991), Japanese footballer
- Kazuto Sakata (坂田 和人; born 1966), Japanese motorcycle racer
- Kazuto Seki (関 一人; born 1975), Japanese yacht racer
- Kazuto Taguchi (田口 麗斗; born 1995), Japanese baseball player
- Kazuto Tsuyuki (筑城 和人; born 1984), Japanese footballer

== Fictional characters ==
- Kazuto Hongō (北郷 一刀), protagonist of the visual novel series Koihime Musō
- Kazuto Izuka (飯塚 和人), protagonist of the manga series The World of Narue
- Kazuto Kirigaya (桐ヶ谷 和人), protagonist of the light novel series Sword Art Online
- Kazuto Tokino male protagonist of the anime/manga series "UFO Ultramaiden Valkyrie"
