= Kirinji =

Kirinji may refer to:

- Kirinji (band), a Japanese pop band
- Kirinji Kazuharu (born 1953), former sumo wrestler known as Kirinji from 1974 to 1988
- Daikirin Takayoshi (1942–2010), former sumo wrestler known as Kirinji from 1962 to 1970
