= Hōō Umagorō =

Japanese sumo wrestler

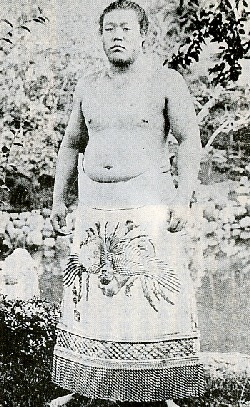

Personal information
- Native name: 鳳凰 馬五郎
- Born: Miyokawa Toranosuke; September 3, 1866 Narashino, Chiba District, Japan
- Died: May 4, 1907 (aged 40)
- Height: 1.80 m (5 ft 11 in)
- Weight: 117 kg (258 lb)

Sport
- Sport: Sumo
- Retired: May, 1903
- Heya: Miyagino
- Record: 109-68-31-7 draws-15 holds
- Debut: May, 1887
- Highest rank: Ōzeki (January, 1897)
- Elder name: Miyagino
- Championships: 3 (Makuuchi, unofficial)
- Updated on February, 2023

Hōō Umagorō (鳳凰 馬五郎; September 3, 1866 – May 4, 1907) was a Japanese professional sumo wrestler from Narashino, Shimōsa. He made his debut in May 1887 and wrestled for Miyagino stable. He reached the makuuchi division in January 1893 and reached the rank of ōzeki in 1897. He retired in May, 1903 and died in May, 1907.

== Career ==
=== Early career ===
His real name was Miyokawa Toranosuke (三代川 寅之助) and was known for his large body and strength since he was a boy. He joined Miyagino stable because the then head coach (Miyagino Umagoro) was from Makuhari, Chiba District and made his professional debut in May 1886 under the shikona Kikutayama (菊田山). It is thought that his first shikona was chosen to pay homage to his hometown shrine of Kikuta. He was later given the shikona Araumi (荒海) in May 1887 before changing it to Ōtori (鳳) in January 1891. Upon promotion to juryō, in June 1892, he was given the shikona Hōō (鳳凰).
He reached the top makuuchi division in January 1893 after only one tournament in juryō. After three years in maegashira, he was promoted to sekiwake in May 1896. During that year, he dominated the competition, claiming both of that year's championships. However, as the yūshō system was not invented until 1909, these championships are now considered unofficial. After his sanyaku debut, Hōō was immediately promoted to ōzeki in January 1897. His years as a top division wrestler were marked by his strong rivalry with Yokozuna Konishiki and then-sekiwake Asashio.

=== Ōzeki career and yokozuna hopes ===
In 1898, Hōō scored his best record with seven wins and two draws (this was his fourth tournament in makuuchi), and won a third championship. He was at the peak of his career and was being presented as a future yokozuna. However, due to heavy drinking problems, Hōō was denied the rank after the May, 1898 tournament and dropped back to maegashira in 1902. In 1903, he changed his shikona to Miyagino (宮城野) in order to build a comeback. However it failed and Hōō retired during the 1903's May tournament.

== Retirement from sumo ==
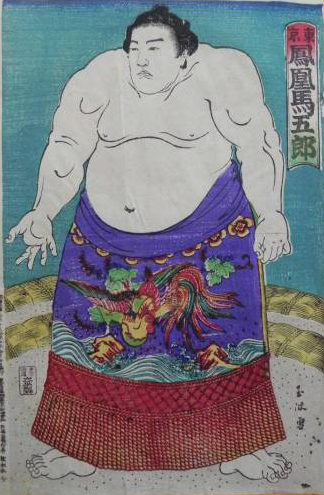
Hōō in an ukiyo-e print (c. 1890)

=== Toshiyori career ===
Hōō Umagorō became a coach in 1894. During that period he took the name of his former master, changing his name to Umagoro, and taking his late master's title of Miyagino. He became an active oyakata while still competing in the makuuchi division. After his retirement, he was a popular master who was well received by younger generations, among whom he recruited future yokozuna Ōtori, to whom he bestowed his old shikona. In the Association, he notably served as shimpan but resigned due to his poor health. He later developed spinal cord disease and died at the young age of 40, in 1907.

=== Trivia ===
In 1974, Nishonoseki stable wrestler Hōō Tomomichi took the Hōō shikona.

== Top division record ==
Hōō Umagorō
-	Spring	Summer
1892	Unknown	East Jūryō #7; 8–1; 1d
1893	West Maegashira #12; 2–3–4; 1h	West Maegashira #11; 2–7–1
1894	East Maegashira #12; 7–2–1	East Maegashira #9; 6–1–2; 1h
1895	West Maegashira #3; 3–3–2; 2h	West Maegashira #1; 6–2–1; 1h
1896	West Maegashira #1; 8–1–1; Unofficial	East Sekiwake #1; 8–0–1; 1h Unofficial
1897	West Ōzeki #2; 6–1–1; 2h	West Ōzeki #1; 5–4–1
1898	West Ōzeki #1; 7–0–1; 2d Unofficial	West Ōzeki #1; 5–3–1; 1h
1899	West Ōzeki #1; 2–3–5	West Ōzeki #2; 6–3–1
1900	West Ōzeki #2; 2–3–1; 2d - 2h	West Maegashira #1; 8–1–1
1901	West Komusubi #1; 4–3–2; 1h	East Sekiwake #1; 5–3–1; 1h
1902	West Sekiwake #1; 2–6–1; 1d	West Maegashira #2; 4–5–1
1903	West Maegashira #2; 1–8–1	East Maegashira #7; Retired; 2–5–1; 1d - 1h
Record given as win-loss-absent Top Division Champion Retired Lower Divisions Key: d=Draw(s) (引分); h=Hold(s) (預り); nr=no result recorded Divisions: Makuuchi — Jūryō — Makushita — Sandanme — Jonidan — Jonokuchi Makuuchi ranks: Yokozuna (not ranked as such on banzuke until 1890); Ōzeki — Sekiwake — Komusubi — Maegashira

*Championships for the best record in a tournament were not recognized or awarded before the 1909 summer tournament and the above championships that are labelled "unofficial" are historically conferred. For more information see yūshō.

== See also ==
- Glossary of sumo terms
- List of past sumo wrestlers
- List of ōzeki
