= Saganohana Katsumi =

Japanese sumo wrestler

佐賀ノ花 勝巳 Saganohana Katsumi
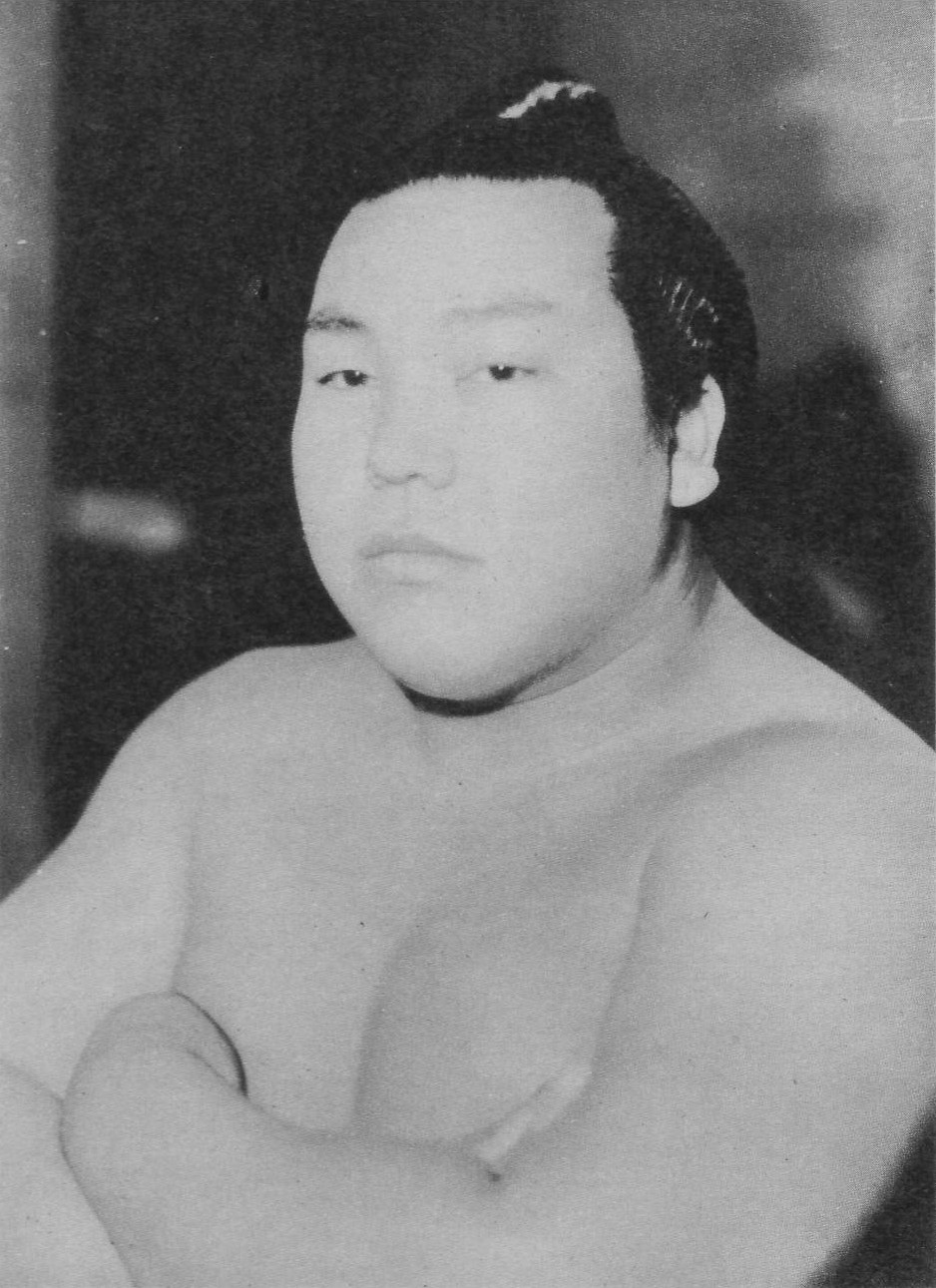

Personal information
- Born: Katsumi Kitamura; December 5, 1917 Saga City, Saga, Japan
- Died: March 28, 1975 (aged 57)
- Height: 1.70 m (5 ft 7 in)
- Weight: 128 kg (282 lb)

Sport
- Sport: Sumo
- Retired: January, 1952
- Heya: Kumegawa→Nishonoseki
- Record: 263-189-30-1draw
- Debut: May, 1934
- Highest rank: Ōzeki (May, 1945)
- Elder name: Nishonoseki
- Championships: 1 (Makuuchi)
- Gold Stars: 2 (Minanogawa)
- Updated on June 2020

Saganohana Katsumi (5 December 1917 – 28 March 1975) was a professional sumo wrestler born as Katsumi Kitamura in Saga City, Japan. His highest rank was ōzeki.

== Sumo career ==
In 1934, with the help of Tamanishiki who had come as part of a regional sumo exhibition, the future Saganohana joined the now defunct Kumegawa stable and first entered the ring in May of that same year. He would later join Tamanishiki's Nishonoseki stable.

He first made it to the top division makuuchi in the Summer 1939 tournament, and continued to find success. He would defeat then yokozuna Minanogawa twice for two gold stars or kinboshi. In the Spring 1941 tournament, he received an 8–7 record at maegashira 1 and it was expected he would be promoted to the titled ranks, called san'yaku. He was however, left at the same rank for the following tournament, but this allowed him another chance to distinguish himself, as he managed an improved 9–6 record and also had his second kinboshi victory against yokozuna Minanogawa. This convincing record finally accorded him promotion to the lowest san'yaku rank of komusubi for the Summer 1942 tournament. An impressive 11–4 record at this rank allowed his immediate promotion to sekiwake for the next tournament. He would post two more winning record tournaments at sekiwake, though he would miss his last two bouts of the Summer 1943 tournament due to injury. Though he was demoted to komusubi for the following Spring 1944 tournament, he excelled, posting a 13–2 record and taking his one and only makuuchi championship.

He was promoted to ōzeki due to his performance, but he had already left for a regional exhibition and was informed of his promotion while attending a memorial service for former yokozuna Tamanishiki, who died of appendicitis while an active wrestler. Before the spirit of the departed, through tears, he announced his promotion to ōzeki.

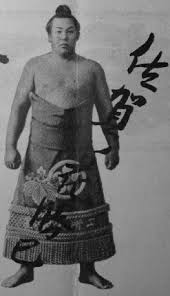

Through the end of World War II and the aftermath, Saganohana was one of the mainstays of sumo. Unusually, in the Autumn 1948 tournament, after the necessary playoff to determine the top division championship between ōzeki Azumafuji and sekiwake Masuiyama, a second playoff to decide the 3rd place was allowed between Saganohana and maegashira Kōzuzan, which Saganohana won. This was the only time before or since that such a playoff was allowed in sumo history. In the Summer 1949 tournament, even though he only had a 7–8 record, he defeated all four yokozuna, the first achievement of its like in history. In the Summer 1951 tournament, after seven years as an ōzeki he was finally demoted. He struggled on for two more tournaments, but upon inheriting Tamanishiki's elder name, he retired before the Spring 1952 tournament to take over management of Nishonoseki stable.

== Coaching career ==
Nishonoseki stable had great success under his management, producing the eventual yokozuna Wakanohana I, ōzeki Kotogahama, sekiwake Tamanoumi Daitarō and later the ōzeki Daikirin and most notably the yokozuna who held the record for most championships in sumo history for many decades, Taihō.

Starting in 1962, the stable would suffer from upheaval beginning with Tamanoumi Daitarō acquiring the Kataonami elder name and breaking off to start his own stable. Saganohana died in 1975, and troubles for his stable only continued, as his apparent successor, the former Daikirin, could not come to agreement with Saganohana's widow. The head of stable eventually went to wrestler Kongō who retired at only 28 to marry Saganohana's daughter and take over, though the daughter backed out of the marriage and Saganohana's wife was obliged to adopt Kongō as her foster son. Daikirin left to form his own Oshiogawa stable.

== Career record ==
Saganohana
-	Spring Haru basho, Tokyo	Summer Natsu basho, Tokyo	Autumn Aki basho, Tokyo
1934	x	(Maezumo)	Not held
1935	East Jonokuchi #5; 5–1	East Jonidan #13; 5–1	Not held
1936	East Sandanme #12; 5–1	East Makushita #20; 5–6	Not held
1937	East Makushita #23; 8–3	West Makushita #6; 9–4	Not held
1938	East Jūryō #11; 10–3	East Jūryō #3; 6–7	Not held
1939	West Jūryō #6; 10–3	West Maegashira #14; 8–7	Not held
1940	East Maegashira #6; 4–11	East Maegashira #13; 10–5 ★	Not held
1941	West Maegashira #1; 8–7	West Maegashira #1; 9–6	Not held
1942	East Maegashira #1; 9–6 ★	East Komusubi; 11–4	Not held
1943	West Sekiwake; 8–7	East Sekiwake; 7–6–2	Not held
1944	West Komusubi; 13–2	East Sekiwake; 7–3	East Ōzeki; 0–3–7
1945	Not held	West Ōzeki; 4–3	West Ōzeki; 4–6
1946	Not held	Not held	West Ōzeki #2; 10–3
1947	Not held	East Ōzeki; 6–4	East Ōzeki; 7–4
1948	Not held	East Ōzeki; 6–4–1draw	East Ōzeki; 9–2
1949	East Ōzeki; 9–4	East Ōzeki; 7–8	East Ōzeki #2; 10–5
1950	West Ōzeki; 9–6	West Ōzeki #2; 9–6	West Ōzeki; 4–11
1951	West Ōzeki #2; 7–8	West Sekiwake; 4–11	East Maegashira #2; 1–8–6
1952	West Maegashira #10; Retired; 0–0–15	x	x
Record given as wins–losses–absences Top division champion Top division runner-up Retired Lower divisions Non-participation Sanshō key: F=Fighting spirit; O=Outstanding performance; T=Technique Also shown: ★=Kinboshi; P=Playoff(s); Divisions: Makuuchi — Jūryō — Makushita — Sandanme — Jonidan — Jonokuchi Makuuchi ranks: Yokozuna — Ōzeki — Sekiwake — Komusubi — Maegashira

== See also ==
- Glossary of sumo terms
- List of past sumo wrestlers
- List of sumo tournament top division champions
- List of ōzeki
