= Daitetsu Tadamitsu =

Sumo wrestler

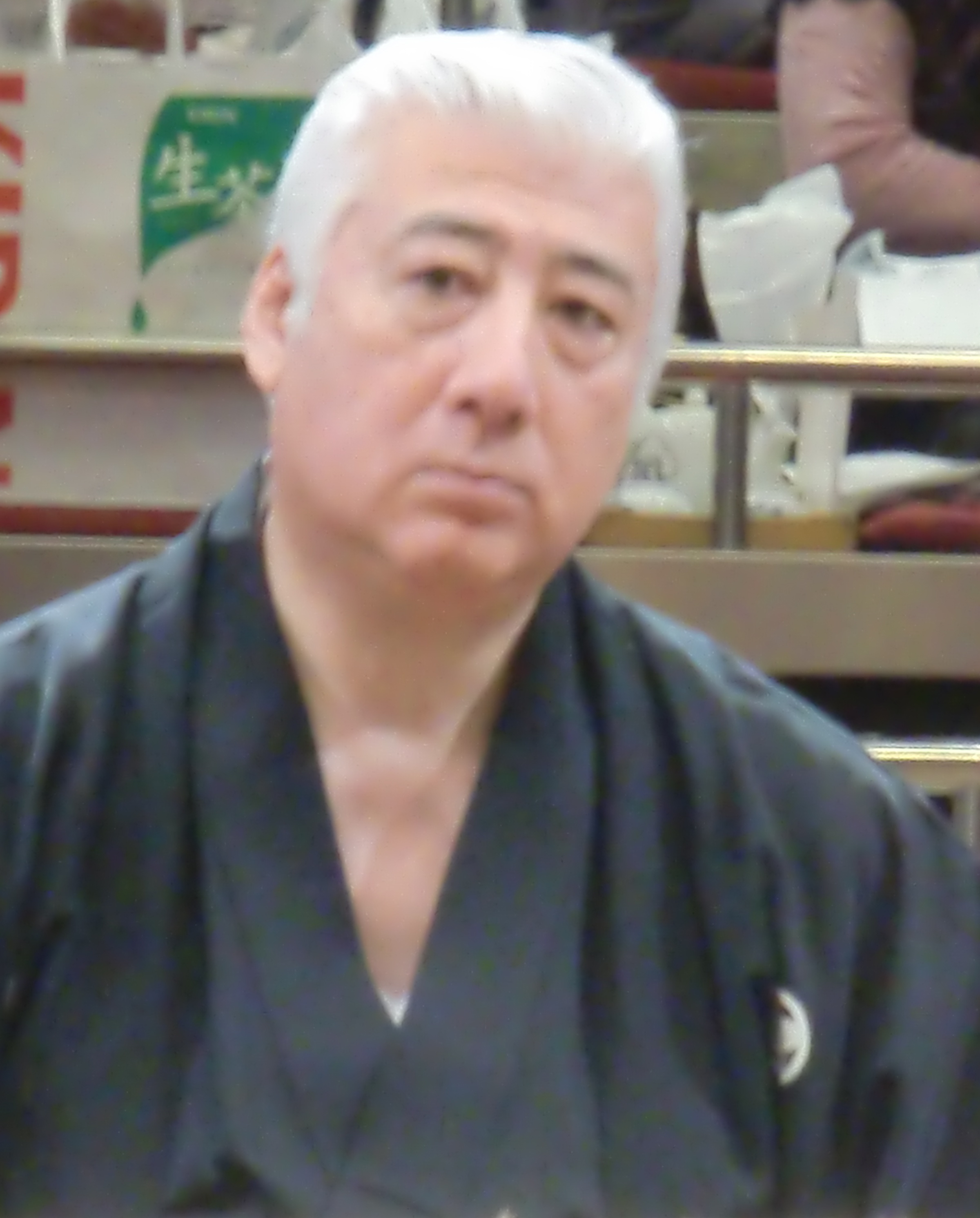

Personal information
- Native name: 大徹 忠晃
- Born: Tadamitsu Minami; 29 October 1956 (age 69) Ōno, Fukui, Japan
- Height: 1.93 m (6 ft 4 in)
- Weight: 126 kg (278 lb)

Sport
- Sport: Sumo
- Retired: September, 1990
- Heya: Nishonoseki
- Record: 587-612
- Debut: July, 1971
- Highest rank: Komusubi (March, 1987)
- Elder name: Minatogawa
- Gold Stars: 1 (Chiyonofuji)
- Updated on 21 October 2021

Daitetsu Tadamitsu (大徹 忠晃; born 29 October 1956 as Tadamitsu Minami (南 忠晃)) is a former sumo wrestler from Ōno, Fukui, Japan. He made his professional debut in July 1971, and reached the top division in November, 1983. His highest rank was komusubi. He retired in September 1990, and has worked as a coach at both the original Nishonoseki stable and the new version of the stable, under the elder name Minatogawa.

== Career ==
He did kendo at junior high school. He entered Nishonoseki stable and began his sumo career in July 1971. In July 1979 he was undefeated in all seven of his makushita bouts but lost a playoff for the yūshō to Sadanoumi. He reached the jūryō division in January 1980, but lasted only one tournament before being demoted. He returned to jūryō in July 1982 and reached the top makuuchi division in November 1983. In July 1985 he defeated yokozuna Chiyonofuji to earn his first kinboshi. In March 1987 he was promoted to komusubi, becoming the first wrestler from Fukui Prefecture to reach a san'yaku rank since the beginning of the Showa era. He held the rank for just a single tournament. He became the only wrestler from the Nishonoseki stable left in makuuchi in September 1988 when Kirinji retired. In January 1989 he returned to the jūryō division where he spent the remainder of his career. He took part in two playoffs for the jūryō championship in May and July 1989, but lost both, to Komafudo and Ryūkōzan, leaving him without a career yūshō in any division. He retired in September 1990. He had not missed a bout in his professional career. He had 587 wins against 612 losses in 1199 bouts over 116 tournaments. His top division record was 209 wins against 256 losses over 31 tournaments.

He was friendly with sumo fan Demon Kogure, and appeared on his radio show All Night Nippon. Demon Kogure was also a guest at Daitetsu's danpatsu-shiki or official retirement ceremony.

== Retirement from sumo ==
Daitestu remained in sumo as an elder of the Japan Sumo Association, under the name of Minatogawa Oyakata. He coached at Nishonoseki stable until it folded in January 2013. He transferred to Matsugane stable, which changed its name to Nishonoseki stable in 2014. He has also been a member of the judging department. From March 2014 until March 2018 he was of three oyakata appointed as members of the board of trustees as the Sumo Association applied for public interest corporation status. He reached the mandatory retirement age for elders of 65 in October 2021, but was re-hired by the Sumo Association as a consultant for a further five years. On 1 July 2024 the Sumo Association announced that Daitetsu had retired early from his consultant role.

== Fighting style ==
Daitetsu was a yotsu-sumo wrestler who preferred a hidari-yotsu (right hand outside, left hand inside) grip on his opponent's mawashi. His most common winning kimarite was yori-kiri (force out). He was above average height which meant he regularly employed tsuri-dashi (lift out). He also used uwatenage (overarm throw).

== Career record ==
Daitetsu Tadamitsu
Year	January Hatsu basho, Tokyo	March Haru basho, Osaka	May Natsu basho, Tokyo	July Nagoya basho, Nagoya	September Aki basho, Tokyo	November Kyūshū basho, Fukuoka
1971	x	x	x	(Maezumo)	East Jonokuchi #9; 4–3	East Jonidan #75; 2–2
1972	East Jonidan #63; 0–3	West Jonidan #87; 0–0	West Jonidan #87; 5–2	West Jonidan #28; 3–4	East Jonidan #36; 4–3	East Jonidan #22; 3–4
1973	East Jonidan #32; 5–2	East Sandanme #71; 2–5	West Jonidan #10; 3–4	West Jonidan #22; 5–2	West Sandanme #66; 4–3	East Sandanme #51; 3–4
1974	East Sandanme #64; 5–2	East Sandanme #38; 4–3	East Sandanme #29; 3–4	East Sandanme #39; 3–4	East Sandanme #47; 4–3	West Sandanme #35; 3–4
1975	East Sandanme #44; 2–5	East Sandanme #62; 4–3	West Sandanme #48; 5–2	West Sandanme #21; 3–4	West Sandanme #32; 5–2	West Sandanme #4; 4–3
1976	East Makushita #53; 4–3	West Makushita #45; 3–4	West Makushita #57; 3–4	West Sandanme #9; 5–2	West Makushita #45; 4–3	West Makushita #32; 2–5
1977	East Makushita #55; 4–3	West Makushita #43; 4–3	West Makushita #31; 5–2	East Makushita #16; 3–4	East Makushita #23; 5–2	East Makushita #11; 3–4
1978	West Makushita #16; 3–4	West Makushita #23; 4–3	East Makushita #18; 3–4	West Makushita #26; 3–4	West Makushita #35; 4–3	East Makushita #28; 4–3
1979	East Makushita #22; 6–1–P	West Makushita #4; 2–5	East Makushita #22; 2–5	West Makushita #41; 7–0–P	East Makushita #5; 4–3	West Makushita #3; 4–3
1980	West Jūryō #12; 2–13	West Makushita #11; 3–4	East Makushita #18; 2–5	West Makushita #37; 3–4	East Makushita #46; 6–1	East Makushita #22; 5–2
1981	East Makushita #10; 4–3	East Makushita #7; 2–5	West Makushita #19; 4–3	West Makushita #11; 4–3	West Makushita #8; 1–6	West Makushita #32; 6–1
1982	East Makushita #10; 4–3	East Makushita #7; 4–3	West Makushita #4; 5–2	West Jūryō #13; 8–7	East Jūryō #9; 10–5	West Jūryō #3; 6–9
1983	East Jūryō #8; 9–6	West Jūryō #4; 9–6	East Jūryō #1; 5–10	East Jūryō #7; 9–6	West Jūryō #4; 11–4	West Maegashira #11; 8–7
1984	East Maegashira #9; 8–7	West Maegashira #4; 5–10	West Maegashira #9; 8–7	West Maegashira #6; 6–9	East Maegashira #11; 8–7	West Maegashira #7; 8–7
1985	West Maegashira #3; 4–11	East Maegashira #12; 8–7	East Maegashira #8; 8–7	East Maegashira #4; 4–11 ★	East Maegashira #12; 9–6	West Maegashira #3; 5–10
1986	West Maegashira #10; 8–7	West Maegashira #7; 7–8	East Maegashira #10; 7–8	West Maegashira #11; 8–7	East Maegashira #7; 8–7	West Maegashira #1; 5–10
1987	East Maegashira #6; 9–6	West Komusubi #1; 3–12	West Maegashira #7; 6–9	West Maegashira #11; 9–6	East Maegashira #4; 4–11	West Maegashira #10; 8–7
1988	East Maegashira #5; 5–10	West Maegashira #11; 9–6	East Maegashira #6; 5–10	West Maegashira #13; 8–7	West Maegashira #8; 6–9	West Maegashira #11; 5–10
1989	East Jūryō #2; 6–9	West Jūryō #5; 6–9	East Jūryō #10; 10–5–P	West Jūryō #3; 5–10	West Jūryō #9; 10–5–P	East Jūryō #5; 5–10
1990	West Jūryō #11; 9–6	West Jūryō #5; 7–8	East Jūryō #7; 8–7	East Jūryō #4; 5–10	West Jūryō #10; Retired; 6–9	x
Record given as wins–losses–absences Top division champion Top division runner-up Retired Lower divisions Non-participation Sanshō key: F=Fighting spirit; O=Outstanding performance; T=Technique Also shown: ★=Kinboshi; P=Playoff(s); Divisions: Makuuchi — Jūryō — Makushita — Sandanme — Jonidan — Jonokuchi Makuuchi ranks: Yokozuna — Ōzeki — Sekiwake — Komusubi — Maegashira

== See also ==
- Glossary of sumo terms
- List of past sumo wrestlers
- List of sumo elders
- List of komusubi
