= Hiodoshi Rikiya =

Japanese sumo wrestler

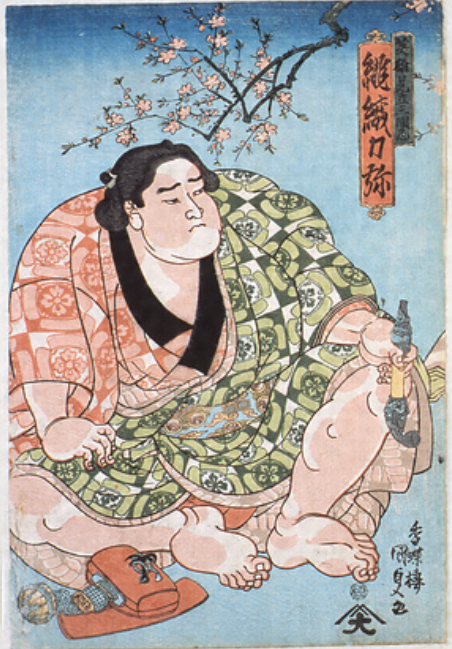
- Hiodoshi II by Utagawa Kunisada I (c. 1827–1843)

Personal information
- Native name: 緋縅 力弥
- Born: Kōtarō Moriwaki; 1799 Kyoto, Yamashiro Province, Japan
- Died: August 15, 1836 (aged 36–37)
- Height: 1.76 m (5 ft 9 1/2 in)
- Weight: 148 kg (326 lb)

Sport
- Sport: Sumo
- Heya: Tamagaki
- Record: 91-32-52-5 draws/12 holds
- Debut: October, 1817
- Highest rank: Ōzeki (November, 1833)
- Championships: 2 (Makuuchi, unofficial)
- Updated on October 2023

Hiodoshi Rikiya (Japanese: 緋縅 力弥; born Kōtarō Moriwaki (森脇 幸太郎, Moriwaki Kōtarō), 1799 – August 15, 1836) was a Japanese professional sumo wrestler from Kyoto. His highest rank was ōzeki, a rank he reached in November 1833, before dying while as an active wrestler in August 1836. As of November 1833, he is the only wrestler from Kyoto Prefecture to have been promoted to sumo's second highest rank.

== Career ==
Hiodoshi began his career in 1817, benefiting from the shinjo system. When promoted in jūryō in 1823, he inherited the shikona, or ring name, of former ōzeki Hiodoshi I, a master in his stable, who was renowned for his longevity because he wrestled in makuuchi for 21 years. His master later adopted him, making Hiodoshi II his master's legitimate heir. In 1824, he was promoted to the makuuchi division and acquired the patronage of the Hirado Domain.

In his second tournament in sumo's highest division, he achieved a very good score, recording 8 victories and beating most of the opponents ranked above him in the rankings, placing him as tournament leader ex-aequo with the then-komusubi Inazuma. Nonetheless, as Inazuma was the highest-ranked of the two, the winner's honours were awarded to him, as was customary at the time. In 1828 he won back-to-back championships, also reaching the san'yaku ranks for the first time with a direct promotion to sekiwake in that year's final tournament. However, as the yūshō system was not introduced until 1909, his two championship victories are now considered unofficial. These two championships in a row would normally have seen him promoted to ōzeki for 1829, but as the ranking was already occupied by stable and successful wrestlers like Inazuma, his promotion was ruled out and he remained in the rank of sekiwake until 1833. During that year, he was promoted because of the absence of Inazuma, which left the rankings unbalanced. After Inazuma's return, he maintained the rank because he was trusted to be a wrestler able to live up to expectations. Promoted to the second-highest rank in sumo, his ōzeki career was marked by an injury that prevented him from competing at this rank, which led to his demotion back to sekiwake. Hiodoshi wrestled two more tournaments at the rank of sekiwake, achieving a majority win each time, but he died while still an active wrestler in August 1836.

As a wrestler he was known as one of the big names of this period along with Inazuma and Ōnomatsu, the public nicknaming this trio of wrestlers "The Three Greats of the Bunsei era's Kakukai" (文政角界の三傑). Although Hiodoshi was inferior to both of them in terms of ability and was never promoted to yokozuna, he had a childlike face and was very popular with the public.

He was renowned for his strength and his pushing and thrusting techniques (tsuki/oshi) so much that his technique later became an illegal move and he was forbidden to use it.

== Top division record ==
- The actual time the tournaments were held during the year in this period often varied.

Hiodoshi Rikiya II
-	Spring	Winter
1824	Unknown	West Jūryō #5; 3–3; 1h
1825	West Maegashira #8; 2–3–3; 2h	West Maegashira #3; 8–1–1
1826	West Maegashira #3; 4–1–2; 3h	West Maegashira #2; 4–4–2
1827	West Maegashira #2; 2–2–2; 1h	Not enrolled
1828	West Maegashira #2; 7–1–2; Unofficial	West Sekiwake #1; 8–0–2; Unofficial
1829	West Sekiwake #1; 5–1–1	West Sekiwake #1; 5–0–2; 2h
1830	West Sekiwake #1; 7–1–2	West Sekiwake #1; 6–2–2
1831	West Sekiwake #1; 5–1–2; 1d-1h	West Sekiwake #1; 5–3
1832	West Sekiwake #1; 4–3–3	Unknown
1833	West Sekiwake #1; 6–1–1; 1d-1h	West Ōzeki #1; 0–0–8
1834	West Ōzeki #1; 0–0–10	Not enrolled
1835	West Haridashi Sekiwake; 2–2–5; 1h	West Sekiwake #1; 4–3–1; 2d
1836	West Sekiwake #1; 4–0–1; 1d	x
Record given as win-loss-absent Top Division Champion Top Division Runner-up Retired Lower Divisions Key:d=Draw(s) (引分); h=Hold(s) (預り); Divisions: Makuuchi — Jūryō — Makushita — Sandanme — Jonidan — Jonokuchi Makuuchi ranks: Yokozuna — Ōzeki — Sekiwake — Komusubi — Maegashira

*Championships for the best record in a tournament were not recognized or awarded before the 1909 summer tournament and the above championships that are labelled "unofficial" are historically conferred. For more information see yūshō.

== See also ==
- Glossary of sumo terms
- List of past sumo wrestlers
- List of ōzeki
