= Hiodoshi Katsugorō =

Japanese sumo wrestler

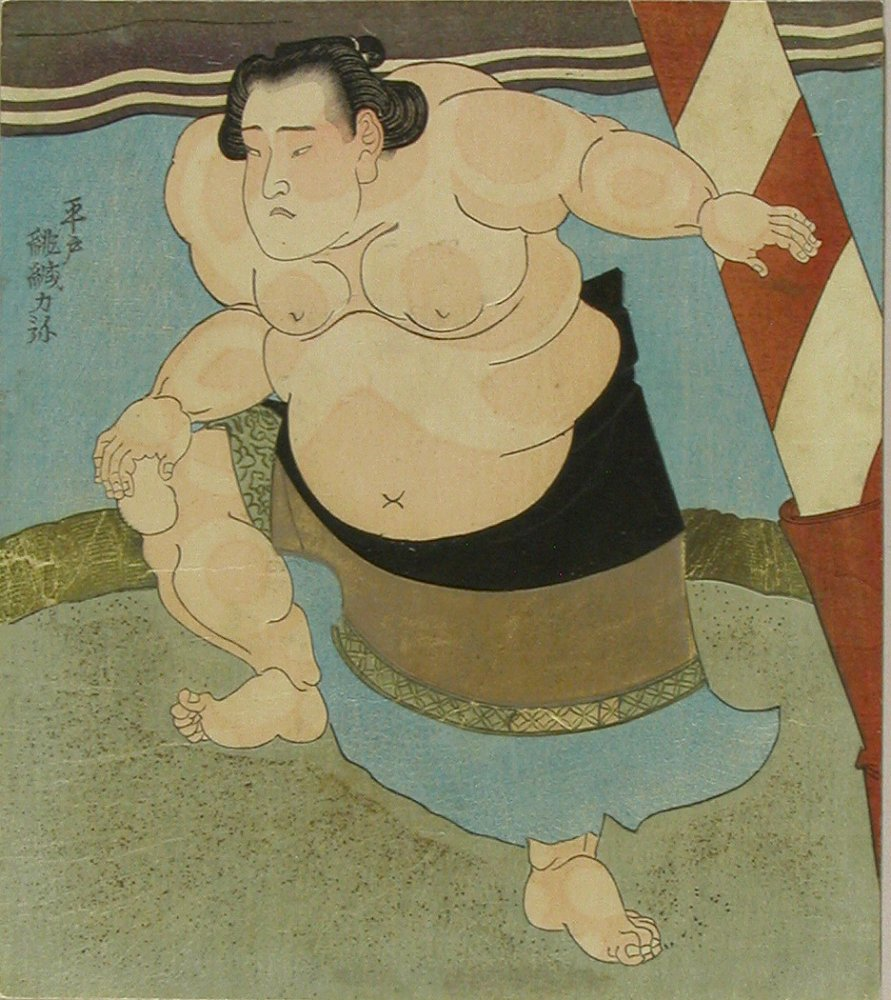
- Hiodoshi when he was still known as "Hiodoshi Rikiya" (c. 1790-1810)

Personal information
- Native name: 緋縅 勝五郎
- Born: Moriwaki ? 1773 Yamagata District, Aki Province, Japan
- Died: February 22, 1830 (aged 56–57)
- Height: 1.77 m (5 ft 9 1/2 in)
- Weight: 116 kg (256 lb)

Sport
- Sport: Sumo
- Retired: February, 1823
- Heya: Tamagaki
- Record: 149-49-92-13 draws/6 holds
- Debut: November, 1794
- Highest rank: Ōzeki (November, 1814)
- Elder name: Akaō
- Updated on October 2023

Hiodoshi Katsugorō (Japanese: 緋縅 勝五郎; born Moriwaki (森脇), 1773 – February 22, 1830) was a Japanese sumo wrestler from Yamagata District, Aki Province (now Kitahiroshima, Hiroshima Prefecture). His highest rank was ōzeki. He is the first wrestler from Hiroshima Prefecture to have been promoted to sumo's second highest rank, and the only one until the promotion of Akinoumi in 1941, 127 years later.

== Career ==
All we know of Hiodoshi's true identity is his family name, Moriwaki. He began his career in the Osaka-based sumo association under the patronage of the Awa-Katsuyama Domain but joined the Edo-based association in 1794 and began his career directly in the sandanme division under the shikona, or ring name, Hiodoshi Rikiya (緋縅 力彌). In 1802 he reached the makuuchi division and acquired the patronage of the Morioka Domain. Known as a wrestler with great stamina, he nevertheless remained in the lower ranks of the division for a long time, suffering from his lack of technique and won few matches against top-ranked wrestlers. In 1813, however, he made his debut in the san'yaku status with a promotion to the rank of komusubi.

In 1814, he was promoted back to back to sekiwake and reached the rank of ōzeki, only retaining it for one tournament. However, Hiodoshi had to miss these tournaments and lost his san'yaku status, only regaining it at the end of his career in 1819 before definitively ending his wrestling career as a maegashira. At the time of his repromotion to san'yaku he changed his shikona to Hiodoshi Katsugorō (緋縅 勝五郎). He retired in January 1822, concluding a career of rare longevity (even by today's standards) of 28 years, including 21 in the top division. After his retirement he became an elder and called himself Akaō (赤翁), meaning 'red elder', and trained ōzeki Hiodoshi II, to whom he gave his former shikona and adopted him as his son.

== Sumo career record ==
- The actual time the tournaments were held during the year in this period often varied.

Hiodoshi Katsugorō
-	Spring	Summer
1800	East Jūryō #2; 2–0; 1h	Unknown
1801	Sat out	Unknown
1802	West Maegashira #3; 4–1–5	West Maegashira #8; 7–0–3
1803	Unknown	East Maegashira #4; 5–1–1; 2d-1h
1804	Unknown	East Maegashira #4; 6–2–1
1805	Unknown	Unknown
1806	Unknown	Unknown
1807	Unknown	East Maegashira #2; 8–1; 1h
1808	Sat out	East Maegashira #2; 7–1–1; 1d
1809	East Maegashira #1; 6–1–1; 1d	East Maegashira #2; 4–1–3; 1h
1810	East Maegashira #1; 8–2	East Maegashira #2; 6–2–1; 1d
1811	East Maegashira #1; 7–2–1	East Maegashira #2; 5–2–2; 1h
1812	Unknown	East Maegashira #1; 5–2–1; 2d
1813	East Komusubi #1; 6–2–1; 1d	East Komusubi #1; 5–1–1; 2d
1814	East Sekiwake #1; 0–0–10	East Ōzeki #1; 0–0–10
1815	Unknown	East Sekiwake #1; 6–2–1
1816	East Sekiwake #1; 5–2; 1h	East Komusubi #1; 4–3–1; 1d
1817	East Komusubi #1; 4–3–2	East Maegashira #2; 6–2; 1d
1818	East Komusubi #1; 5–2–2	East Maegashira #1; 4–2–2
1819	West Komusubi #1; 4–1–5	West Komusubi #1; 4–3–1
1820	West Komusubi #1; 2–1–3	West Maegashira #1; 6–2–1
1821	West Maegashira #1; 5–3–2	West Maegashira #2; 3–2–3
1822	West Maegashira #3; Retired; 0–0–10	x
Record given as win-loss-absent Top Division Champion Top Division Runner-up Retired Lower Divisions Key:d=Draw(s) (引分); h=Hold(s) (預り); Divisions: Makuuchi — Jūryō — Makushita — Sandanme — Jonidan — Jonokuchi Makuuchi ranks: Yokozuna — Ōzeki — Sekiwake — Komusubi — Maegashira

*Championships for the best record in a tournament were not recognized or awarded before the 1909 summer tournament and the above championships that are labelled "unofficial" are historically conferred. For more information see yūshō.

== See also ==
- Glossary of sumo terms
- List of past sumo wrestlers
- List of ōzeki
