= Hōō Tomomichi =

Japanese sumo wrestler (1956–2013)

Personal information
- Native name: 鳳凰 倶往
- Born: 壁谷 友道 Tomomichi Kabetani; 7 December 1956 Gamagori, Aichi, Japan
- Died: 16 January 2013 (aged 56)
- Height: 1.80 m (5 ft 11 in)
- Weight: 148 kg (326 lb)

Sport
- Sport: Sumo
- Retired: May, 1990
- Heya: Nishonoseki
- Record: 617-631-26
- Debut: September, 1971
- Highest rank: Sekiwake (July, 1984)
- Championships: 4 (Jūryō); 1 (Makushita)
- Gold Stars: 3 Wakanohana II (2); Chiyonofuji
- Updated on Sep. 2012

Hōō Tomomichi, born Tomomichi Kabetani (7 December 1956 – 16 January 2013) was a sumo wrestler from Gamagōri, Aichi, Japan. He made his professional debut in September 1971, and reached the top division in July 1979. His highest rank was sekiwake. He is the only sekiwake since the six-tournaments-a-year schedule began in 1958 to never win a sanshō or special prize. He was one of the few wrestlers to face both Takanohana Kenshi and his son Takanohana Kōji, having fought the latter in the makushita division towards the end of his career. He left the sumo world upon retirement in May 1990. He died of heart disease in 2013.

== Career ==
At Nishiura Junior High school he was a member of the judo club and fought in local competitions. He was an admirer of yokozuna Tamanoumi, who had been a member of the same judo club 13 years previously, and when he was in the third grade of junior high he was invited by Hamakaze Oyakata (the former maegashira Miyabashira) to join Tamanoumi's former stable, Nishonoseki. He made his debut in September 1971, fighting under his family name of Kabatani. Unfortunately, Tamanoumi was to die just one month later of peritonitis. Going up through the ranks, because he was still required to complete his junior high education, he was allowed to compete only on Sundays in the January 1972 tournament (on Days 1, 8 and 15) and was not allowed to compete at all in March as the tournament was held away from Tokyo. (Similarly affected were future top division wrestlers Kotokaze and Takarakuni.) In January 1974 he was given the shikona of Hōō, named after an ōzeki of the Meiji era, Hōō Umagorō. In May 1978 he was promoted to jūryō, and in July 1979 at the age of 22 he entered the top makuuchi division for the first time.

His top division results improved after he put on more weight around his hips, and he won two kinboshi or gold stars by defeating yokozuna Wakanohana Kanji II in July 1980 and January 1981. He made his san'yaku debut in November 1980 at komusubi, but inconsistent results saw him fall back to jūryō in July 1981. In September 1981 he won his first ever yūshō or tournament championship and was promoted back to makuuchi. He missed the March 1983 tournament through injury and fell back to jūryō once more, where he achieved the unusual feat for someone who had previously been in san'yaku of winning back-to-back jūryō championships in September and November 1983. Two other former san'yaku wrestlers who have managed this are Washūyama in 1978 and Masurao in 1990. Back in makuuchi Hōō reached his highest rank of sekiwake in July 1984, but scored only 4–11 and never made the rank again. He did achieve a third kinboshi in March 1985 with a win over Chiyonofuji, and competed in a total of 34 top division tournaments, the final one being in January 1989. However, he never did well enough in a tournament to win a sanshō or special prize (he was shortlisted in September 1980 and May 1984 but not chosen), the only wrestler with sekiwake experience not to do so since the introduction of the six tournaments a year system in 1958. In May 1989 he lost all fifteen of his matches in the jūryō division and was demoted to the unsalaried makushita division. He continued to compete, and in July 1989 beat a sixteen-year old Takahanada, later the yokozuna Takanohana Kōji. This made Hōō one of the few wrestlers to have fought both Takanohana Kōji and his father Takanohana Kenshi, who he had met a number of times before the ōzeki's retirement in January 1981. By May 1990 Hōō had fallen to makushita 53, an extremely low rank for a former sekiwake, and he announced his retirement.

== Retirement from sumo ==
Hōō left the Sumo Association and went to work for a company in Tsukiji. However, he did do some unofficial coaching work for Magaki stable and in amateur sumo. In his later years he returned to live in Gamagōri. He died of heart disease on 16 January 2013, at the age of 56.

== Fighting style ==
Hōō was a yotsu-sumo wrestler who preferred fighting on the mawashi or belt, and one of his favourite kimarite was uwatenage, or outer arm throw. He also regularly won by yorikiri (force out) and kotenage (armlock throw).

== Career record ==
Hōō Tomomichi
Year	January Hatsu basho, Tokyo	March Haru basho, Osaka	May Natsu basho, Tokyo	July Nagoya basho, Nagoya	September Aki basho, Tokyo	November Kyūshū basho, Fukuoka
1971	x	x	x	x	(Maezumo)	East Jonokuchi #5; 2–2
1972	West Jonidan #90; 3–0	East Jonidan #37; 0–0	East Jonidan #37; 4–3	East Jonidan #15; 1–6	West Jonidan #40; 3–4	East Jonidan #48; 4–3
1973	West Jonidan #30; 4–3	West Jonidan #18; 3–4	West Jonidan #27; 4–3	East Jonidan #9; 3–4	East Jonidan #29; 6–1	East Sandanme #67; 4–3
1974	East Sandanme #54; 4–3	East Sandanme #43; 5–2	West Sandanme #17; 3–4	West Sandanme #26; 4–3	West Sandanme #12; 5–2	West Makushita #48; 5–2
1975	East Makushita #27; 2–5	East Makushita #44; 4–3	West Makushita #34; 3–4	West Makushita #42; 3–4	West Makushita #54; 4–3	West Makushita #44; 4–3
1976	West Makushita #36; 4–3	East Makushita #32; 3–4	East Makushita #44; 3–4	East Makushita #53; 5–2	East Makushita #33; 4–3	West Makushita #23; 3–4
1977	East Makushita #33; 5–2	West Makushita #17; 4–3	East Makushita #13; 3–4	West Makushita #18; 5–2	West Makushita #10; 2–5	East Makushita #29; 6–1
1978	West Makushita #11; 5–2	West Makushita #2; 5–2	West Jūryō #11; 10–5	West Jūryō #5; 8–7	East Jūryō #3; 8–7	West Jūryō #2; 4–11
1979	West Jūryō #10; 8–7	West Jūryō #8; 8–7	East Jūryō #4; 10–5	East Maegashira #13; 8–7	East Maegashira #9; 9–6	East Maegashira #4; 4–11
1980	West Maegashira #12; 8–7	East Maegashira #9; 8–7	East Maegashira #6; 8–7	East Maegashira #1; 5–10 ★	West Maegashira #7; 10–5	East Komusubi #1; 4–11
1981	East Maegashira #5; 6–9 ★	East Maegashira #8; 6–9	West Maegashira #10; 2–13	West Jūryō #7; 8–7	West Jūryō #5; 11–4; Champion	West Maegashira #11; 9–6
1982	West Maegashira #5; 6–9	West Maegashira #6; 5–10	West Maegashira #11; 8–7	West Maegashira #7; 6–9	East Maegashira #11; 9–6	East Maegashira #5; 6–9
1983	East Maegashira #8; 5–10	East Maegashira #12; Sat out due to injury 0–0–15	East Jūryō #10; 9–6	West Jūryō #5; 6–9	East Jūryō #9; 13–2; Champion	West Jūryō #1; 11–4–PP; Champion
1984	East Maegashira #10; 8–7	East Maegashira #6; 8–7	East Maegashira #2; 8–7	East Sekiwake #1; 4–11	West Maegashira #4; 5–10	East Maegashira #11; 8–7
1985	East Maegashira #7; 8–7	East Maegashira #3; 5–10 ★	West Maegashira #8; 6–9	East Maegashira #13; 9–6	West Maegashira #5; 4–11	East Jūryō #1; 2–13
1986	East Jūryō #12; 5–10	East Makushita #4; 7–0; Champion	East Jūryō #11; 9–6	East Jūryō #6; 11–4	West Jūryō #1; 5–10	West Jūryō #6; 5–10
1987	East Jūryō #13; 5–10	West Makushita #3; 3–4	East Makushita #8; 5–2	East Makushita #3; 5–2	East Jūryō #13; 9–6	West Jūryō #7; 12–3; Champion
1988	West Jūryō #1; 4–11	West Jūryō #6; 7–8	West Jūryō #9; 9–6	East Jūryō #4; 8–7	West Jūryō #2; 10–5	East Maegashira #13; 8–7
1989	East Maegashira #9; 5–10	West Jūryō #1; 6–9	East Jūryō #5; 0–15	West Makushita #6; 3–4	East Makushita #10; 2–5	East Makushita #23; 6–1
1990	East Makushita #8; 2–5	West Makushita #23; 1–2–4	West Makushita #53; Retired; 0–0–7	x	x	x
Record given as wins–losses–absences Top division champion Top division runner-up Retired Lower divisions Non-participation Sanshō key: F=Fighting spirit; O=Outstanding performance; T=Technique Also shown: ★=Kinboshi; P=Playoff(s); Divisions: Makuuchi — Jūryō — Makushita — Sandanme — Jonidan — Jonokuchi Makuuchi ranks: Yokozuna — Ōzeki — Sekiwake — Komusubi — Maegashira

== See also ==
- Glossary of sumo terms
- List of past sumo wrestlers
- List of sumo tournament second division champions
- List of sekiwake
