= Oginohana Masaaki =

Japanese sumo wrestler

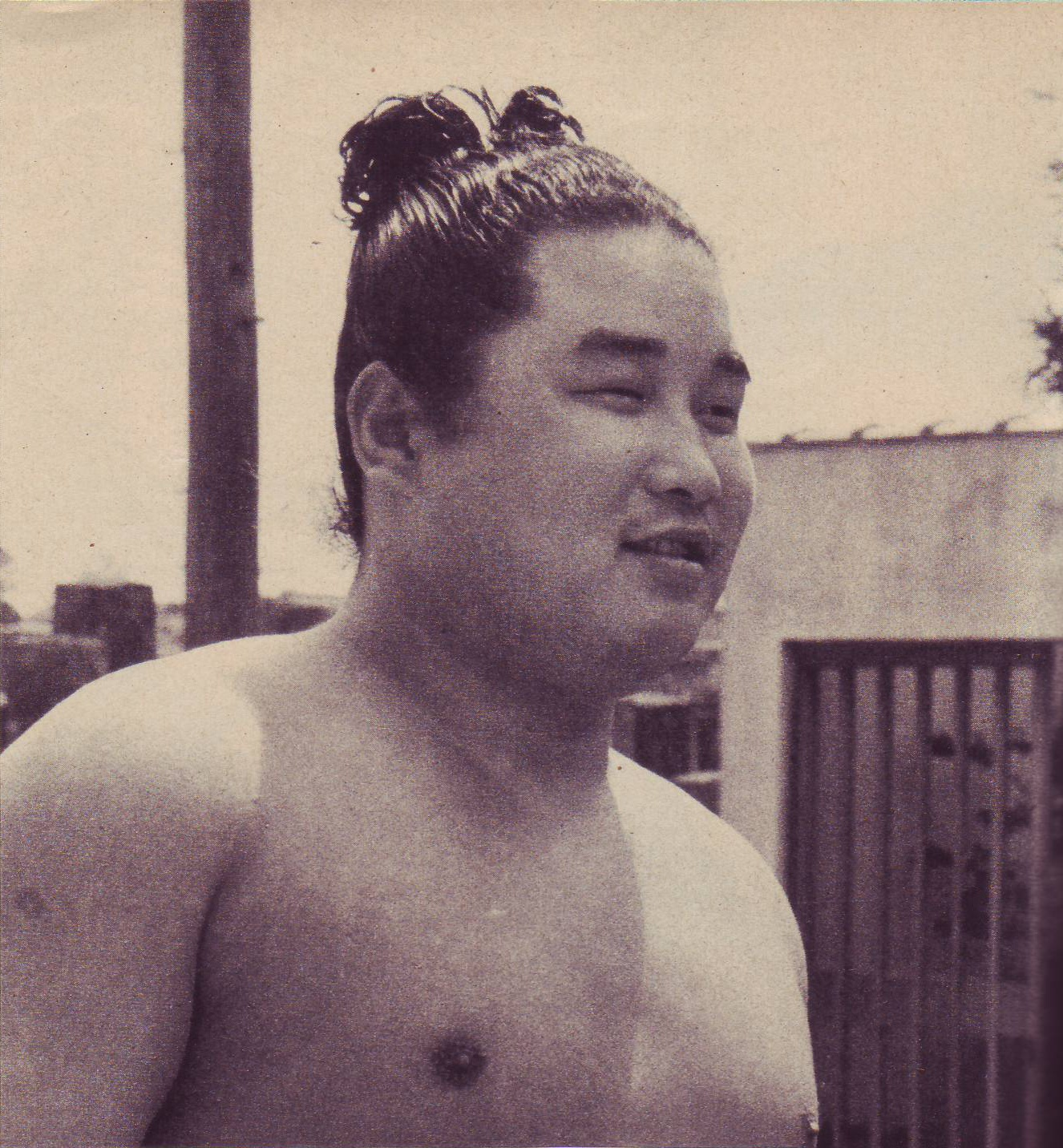
- Masaaki, c. 1959

Personal information
- Native name: 小城ノ花 正昭
- Born: Masaaki Motomura; 29 November 1935 Ogi, Saga, Japan
- Died: 16 December 2006 (aged 71)
- Height: 1.74 m (5 ft 8 1/2 in)
- Weight: 124 kg (273 lb)

Sport
- Sport: Sumo
- Retired: May, 1967
- Heya: Dewanoumi
- Record: 524-522-9
- Debut: January, 1952
- Highest rank: Sekiwake (November, 1962)
- Championships: 1 (Makushita)
- Special Prizes: Technique (1); Outstanding Performance (1)
- Gold Stars: 3

Oginohana Masaaki (born Masaaki Motomura, 29 November 1935 – 16 December 2006) was a sumo wrestler from Ogi, Saga, Japan. He made his professional debut in 1952 and reached the top makuuchi division in 1957. His highest rank was sekiwake. He retired in 1967 and worked as a coach at Dewanoumi stable before leaving the Sumo Association in 2000 upon reaching the mandatory retirement age of 65. He was the father of Oginohana Akikazu and Oginishiki Yasutoshi, both successful sumo wrestlers themselves.

Oginohana Masaaki
Year	January Hatsu basho, Tokyo	March Haru basho, Osaka	May Natsu basho, Tokyo	July Nagoya basho, Nagoya	September Aki basho, Tokyo	November Kyūshū basho, Fukuoka
1952	East Shinjo; 2–1	x	East Jonidan #22; 6–2	x	West Sandanme #45; 3–5	x
1953	East Sandanme #45; 4–4	West Sandanme #41; 5–3	West Sandanme #29; 2–6	x	East Sandanme #36; 3–5	x
1954	East Sandanme #39; 4–4	East Sandanme #31; 6–2	East Sandanme #11; 3–5	x	West Sandanme #13; 3–5	x
1955	West Sandanme #18; 4–4	East Sandanme #13; 5–3	West Makushita #58; 6–2	x	East Makushita #39; 7–1	x
1956	West Makushita #18; 5–2–1	West Makushita #11; 5–3	West Makushita #5; 5–3	x	East Makushita #4; 3–5	x
1957	East Makushita #6; 4–4	West Makushita #4; 8–0; Champion	West Jūryō #12; 12–3	x	West Jūryō #4; 12–3	East Maegashira #18; 7–8
1958	East Maegashira #19; 7–8	East Maegashira #21; 8–7	West Maegashira #16; 9–6	East Maegashira #11; 6–9	West Maegashira #14; 8–7	East Maegashira #13; 9–6
1959	West Maegashira #9; 10–5	East Maegashira #5; 3–12	East Maegashira #14; 9–6	East Maegashira #11; 7–8	East Maegashira #12; 9–6	West Maegashira #6; 6–9
1960	West Maegashira #9; 9–6	West Maegashira #6; 7–8	West Maegashira #8; 8–6–1	East Maegashira #6; 8–7	East Maegashira #2; 9–6; O★	East Komusubi #2; 7–8
1961	West Maegashira #1; 5–10	West Maegashira #5; 6–9	West Maegashira #7; 6–9	East Maegashira #11; 9–6	West Maegashira #5; 10–5	West Maegashira #1; 8–7 ★
1962	East Maegashira #1; 7–8	East Maegashira #2; 6–9	West Maegashira #3; 8–7	East Maegashira #2; 6–9	West Maegashira #4; 10–5	West Sekiwake; 9–6; T
1963	West Sekiwake; 8–7	West Sekiwake; 4–11	East Maegashira #4; 8–7	West Maegashira #1; 6–9	West Maegashira #2; 7–8	West Maegashira #2; 5–10 ★
1964	West Maegashira #6; 7–8	East Maegashira #7; 11–4	East Maegashira #1; 3–12	West Maegashira #7; 4–11	East Maegashira #13; 9–6	East Maegashira #9; 6–9
1965	West Maegashira #11; 7–8	West Maegashira #12; 9–6	East Maegashira #7; 6–9	East Maegashira #9; 6–9	East Maegashira #12; 9–6	East Maegashira #6; 4–11
1966	East Maegashira #15; 8–7	East Maegashira #13; 8–7	East Maegashira #12; 7–8	East Maegashira #13; 6–9	West Maegashira #15; 3–12	East Jūryō #7; 5–10
1967	West Jūryō #12; 8–7	East Jūryō #8; 7–8	East Makushita #2; Retired; 0–0–7	x	x	x
Record given as wins–losses–absences Top division champion Top division runner-up Retired Lower divisions Non-participation Sanshō key: F=Fighting spirit; O=Outstanding performance; T=Technique Also shown: ★=Kinboshi; P=Playoff(s); Divisions: Makuuchi — Jūryō — Makushita — Sandanme — Jonidan — Jonokuchi Makuuchi ranks: Yokozuna — Ōzeki — Sekiwake — Komusubi — Maegashira

== See also ==
- Glossary of sumo terms
- List of past sumo wrestlers
- List of sekiwake
