= Ryūkōzan Kazuto =

Japanese sumo wrestler (1967–1990)

Personal information
- Native name: 龍興山 一人
- Born: Kazuto Miyata; June 23, 1967 Sakai, Osaka, Japan
- Died: February 2, 1990 (aged 22)
- Height: 1.85 m (6 ft 1 in)
- Weight: 160 kg (350 lb; 25 st)

Sport
- Sport: Sumo
- Heya: Dewanoumi
- Record: 170-109-34
- Debut: March, 1983
- Highest rank: Maegashira 5 (March, 1990)
- Championships: 1 (Jūryō); 1 (Jonokuchi)
- Updated on Sep. 2012

Ryūkōzan Kazuto, born Kazuto Miyata (June 23, 1967 – February 2, 1990), was a sumo wrestler from Sakai, Osaka, Japan. He made his professional debut in March 1983, and reached the top makuuchi division in January 1990, alongside his stablemate Oginohana. His highest rank was maegashira 5. He died of a heart attack after only one tournament in the top division.

== Career ==
He was persuaded to give sumo a try while at junior high school, by an acquaintance of makushita wrestler Banshuyama of the Dewanoumi stable, and joined his sumo club. In his third year he decided to enter Dewanoumi stable. He made his professional debut in March 1983, fighting under his family name of Miyata. Unhappy with his lack of progress he ran away from the stable in December 1983. He was eventually persuaded to return by his father, who was being treated for cancer. Miyata had not had his retirement papers handed in or had his top knot cut off, so despite missing four straight tournaments he was able to resume his career in maezumo in September 1984. He won the jonokuchi division championship or yusho with a perfect 7–0 record in the next tournament in November 1984. He rose steadily up the divisions and in May 1989 earned promotion to the jūryō division with a 6–1 record at makushita 5. To mark his promotion his shikona was changed to Ryūkōzan. He came through with a 9–6 record in his jūryō debut, and in the following tournament took the championship with a 10–5 record, defeating Ishinriki and Daitetsu in a three-way playoff. In the next tournament an 11–4 record saw him promoted to the top makuuchi division, alongside his friend and stablemate Oginohana. Both Ryūkōzan and Oginohana came through with winning records in their top division debuts in January 1990.

== Death ==
Ryūkōzan died of a heart attack in training on February 2, 1990, whilst preparing for the next tournament, making him the first sekitori to die whilst active since Tamanoumi in 1971. He was 22 years old. As his rank for the following tournament would have been his highest ever at maegashira 5, his name was included on the March 1990 banzuke instead of the rank being left blank as would normally be the case with a deceased wrestler, to honour him. Following his death the Japan Sumo Association introduced mandatory ECG checks for all wrestlers and required installation of automated external defibrillators at every stable. On 4 July 2019 his former stablemate Oginohana, now Dewanoumi Oyakata, collapsed at a training session whilst supervising jonokuchi wrestlers. It was diagnosed as variant angina and he was saved by the availability of an automated external defibrillator.

== Fighting style ==
Ryukozan was a yotsu-sumo wrestler who preferred a migi-yotsu (left hand outside, right hand inside) grip on his opponent's mawashi. His most common winning kimarite was a straightforward yorikiri, or force out.

== Career record ==
Ryūkōzan Kazuto
Year	January Hatsu basho, Tokyo	March Haru basho, Osaka	May Natsu basho, Tokyo	July Nagoya basho, Nagoya	September Aki basho, Tokyo	November Kyūshū basho, Fukuoka
1983	x	(Maezumo)	West Jonokuchi #19; 3–4	West Jonokuchi #22; 4–3	East Jonokuchi #3; 4–3	East Jonidan #127; 3–4
1984	West Jonidan #127; Sat out due to injury 0–0–7	West Jonokuchi #34; Sat out due to injury 0–0–7	(Banzukegai)	(Banzukegai)	(Maezumo)	West Jonokuchi #38; 7–0; Champion
1985	East Jonidan #55; 5–2	West Jonidan #19; 5–2	West Sandanme #81; 4–3	West Sandanme #62; 5–2	West Sandanme #29; 3–4	West Sandanme #40; 3–4
1986	West Sandanme #55; 2–1–4	East Sandanme #87; 6–1	West Sandanme #32; 6–1	West Makushita #53; 3–4	East Sandanme #7; 4–3	East Makushita #52; 6–1
1987	West Makushita #24; 3–4	East Makushita #33; 4–3	East Makushita #24; 4–3	West Makushita #16; 3–4	West Makushita #21; 5–2	West Makushita #11; 4–3
1988	West Makushita #7; 3–4	West Makushita #11; 4–3	East Makushita #7; 3–3–1	East Makushita #16; 4–3	East Makushita #10; 4–3	East Makushita #7; 3–4
1989	East Makushita #13; 4–3	East Makushita #9; 4–3	East Makushita #5; 6–1	West Jūryō #13; 9–6	East Jūryō #9; 10–5–PP; Champion	West Jūryō #2; 11–4
1990	West Maegashira #10; 9–6	East Maegashira #5; Retired –	x	x	x	x
Record given as wins–losses–absences Top division champion Top division runner-up Retired Lower divisions Non-participation Sanshō key: F=Fighting spirit; O=Outstanding performance; T=Technique Also shown: ★=Kinboshi; P=Playoff(s); Divisions: Makuuchi — Jūryō — Makushita — Sandanme — Jonidan — Jonokuchi Makuuchi ranks: Yokozuna — Ōzeki — Sekiwake — Komusubi — Maegashira

== See also ==
- Glossary of sumo terms
- List of past sumo wrestlers
- List of sumo tournament second division champions
