= Akinoumi Setsuo =

Japanese sumo wrestler

安藝ノ海 節男 Akinoumi Setsuo
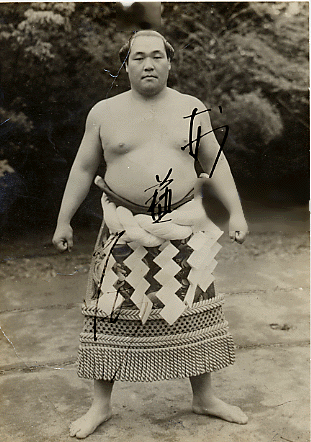

Personal information
- Born: Nagata Setsuo; May 30, 1914 Hiroshima, Japan
- Died: March 25, 1979 (aged 64)
- Height: 1.77 m (5 ft 9 1/2 in)
- Weight: 127.5 kg (281 lb)

Sport
- Sport: Sumo
- Retired: November, 1946
- Heya: Dewanoumi
- Record: 209–101–38
- Debut: February 1932
- Highest rank: Yokozuna (May 1942)
- Elder name: Fujishima
- Championships: 1 (Makuuchi); 1 (Jonokuchi)
- Gold Stars: 1 (Futabayama)
- Updated on June 2020

Akinoumi Setsuo (Japanese: 安藝ノ海 節男, Hepburn: Akinoumi Setsuo; May 30, 1914 – March 25, 1979), born Nagata Setsuo (永田 節男), was a Japanese professional sumo wrestler from Hiroshima. He was the sport's 37th yokozuna.

== Career ==
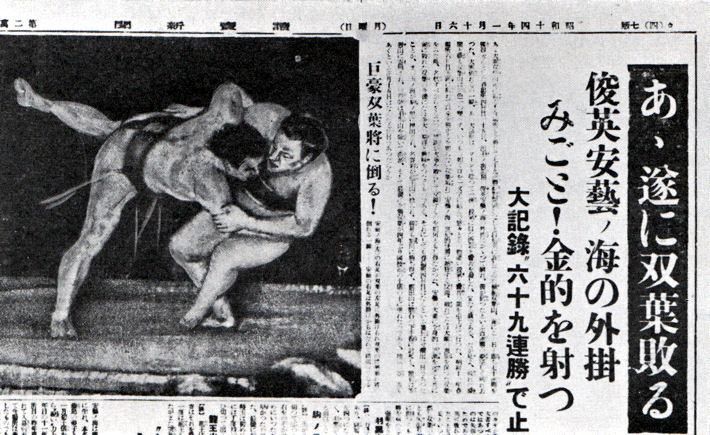
Akinoumi brings Futabayama's record winning streak to an end in January 1939, as reported in the Yomiuri Shimbun

Akinoumi made his professional debut in February 1932 and reached the top makuuchi division in January 1938. He was the man who ended Futabayama's record 69 bout winning streak in January 1939. As he was only ranked as a maegashira at the time, it was regarded as an enormous upset. He defeated the yokozuna by sotogake, an outer leg trip. He had practiced this technique in training with Komanosato, who had been Futabayama's 69th and final defeated opponent. He was overwhelmed by his achievement, but was told by his stablemaster, "Become a rikishi not to be praised when he wins but to cause an uproar when he loses."

His only top division championship came in May 1940 when he was ranked as a sekiwake. At the time of his promotion to ōzeki in 1941, he was the first wrestler from Hiroshima Prefecture to be promoted at this rank since Hiodoshi Katsugorō in 1814, 127 years earlier. Akinoumi earned promotion to yokozuna in May 1942 after two runner-up performances of 13 wins against two losses. He was promoted simultaneously with Terukuni. Akinoumi was not a particularly successful yokozuna, lasting only eight tournaments at the rank and not managing to win any further championships. He is arguably better remembered for his victory over Futabayama than his exploits as a grand champion.

== Retirement from sumo ==
Akinoumi retired in November 1946, and became an elder of the Japan Sumo Association with the name of Fujishima. He married the daughter of Dewanoumi Oyakata, the former yokozuna Tsunenohana, but was unfaithful to her, his geisha mistress giving birth the same day that his wife did. They were later divorced. This put an end to any hopes of becoming the head of Dewanoumi stable, and he left the sumo world in January 1955. He later remarried. He ran a chanko restaurant, and when that went out of business, a clothing store. He also appeared as a sumo commentator on broadcasts of tournaments. He celebrated his 60th birthday in 1974 but for reasons which are unclear, did not get to perform the kanreki dohyō-iri ceremony. He died in 1979 of congestive heart failure.

== Career record ==
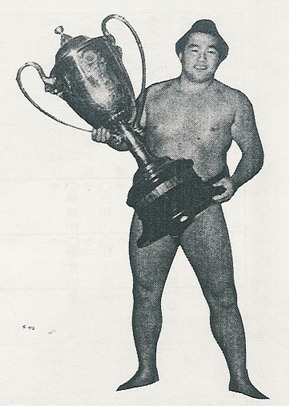
Akinoumi holding the Emperor's Cup after winning the May 1940 tournament

- Through most of the 1930s and 1940s only two tournaments were held a year, and in 1946 only one was held.

Akinoumi Setsuo
-	Spring Haru basho, Tokyo	March Sangatsu basho, varied	Summer Natsu basho, Tokyo	October Jūgatsu basho, varied
1932	(Maezumo)	(Maezumo)	West Jonokuchi #12; 3–3	West Jonokuchi #12; 6–0; Champion
Record given as wins–losses–absences Top division champion Top division runner-up Retired Lower divisions Non-participation Sanshō key: F=Fighting spirit; O=Outstanding performance; T=Technique Also shown: ★=Kinboshi; P=Playoff(s); Divisions: Makuuchi — Jūryō — Makushita — Sandanme — Jonidan — Jonokuchi Makuuchi ranks: Yokozuna — Ōzeki — Sekiwake — Komusubi — Maegashira

-	Spring Haru basho, Tokyo	Summer Natsu basho, Tokyo	Autumn Aki basho, Tokyo
1933	East Jonidan #12; 2–4	West Jonidan #19; 4–2	Not held
1934	West Sandanme #30; 5–1	East Makushita #23; 6–5	Not held
1935	West Makushita #13; 7–4	West Makushita #3; 6–5	Not held
1936	West Jūryō #14; 6–5	West Jūryō #8; 5–6	Not held
1937	West Jūryō #14; 7–4	East Jūryō #8; 10–3	Not held
1938	West Maegashira #16; 8–5	West Maegashira #10; 9–4	Not held
1939	West Maegashira #3; 6–7 ★	East Maegashira #4; 10–5	Not held
1940	West Sekiwake; 10–5	West Sekiwake; 14–1	Not held
1941	East Ōzeki; 12–3	East Ōzeki; 9–6	Not held
1942	West Haridashi Ōzeki; 13–2	West Ōzeki; 13–2	Not held
1943	East Yokozuna-Ōzeki; 12–3	West Haridashi Yokozuna; 11–4	Not held
1944	Sat out due to injury	West Haridashi Yokozuna; 5–5	Sat out due to injury
1945	Not held	East Haridashi Yokozuna; 6–1	East Yokozuna; 4–6
1946	Not held	Not held	East Yokozuna; Retired; 0–0–13
Record given as win-loss-absent Top Division Champion Top Division Runner-up Retired Lower Divisions Key: ★=Kinboshi(s); d=Draw(s) (引分); h=Hold(s) (預り); Divisions: Makuuchi — Jūryō — Makushita — Sandanme — Jonidan — Jonokuchi Makuuchi ranks: Yokozuna — Ōzeki — Sekiwake — Komusubi — Maegashira

== See also ==
- Glossary of sumo terms
- List of past sumo wrestlers
- List of sumo tournament top division champions
- List of yokozuna

Preceded by Haguroyama Masaji	37th Yokozuna; 1941–1953	Succeeded by Terukuni Manzō
Yokozuna is not a successive rank, and more than one wrestler can hold the title at once
