= Terukuni Manzō =

Japanese sumo wrestler

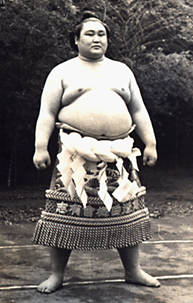
- Terukuni, circa 1943

Personal information
- Native name: 照國 万藏
- Born: Suga Manzō; January 10, 1919 Akita, Japan
- Died: March 20, 1977 (aged 58)
- Height: 1.74 m (5 ft 8 1/2 in)
- Weight: 161 kg (355 lb)

Sport
- Sport: Sumo
- Retired: January, 1953
- Heya: Isegahama
- Record: 313-110-74
- Debut: January 1935
- Highest rank: Yokozuna (May 1942)
- Elder name: Isegahama
- Championships: 2 (Makuuchi); 1 (Jūryō); 1 (Makushita)
- Gold Stars: 1 (Minanogawa)
- Updated on June 2020

Terukuni Manzō (Japanese: 照國 万藏; January 10, 1919 – March 20, 1977) was a Japanese professional sumo wrestler from Ogachi, Akita. He was the sport's 38th yokozuna. He was promoted to yokozuna without any top division tournament titles to his name, although he later attained two.

== Career ==
Born Suga Manzō (菅 萬藏), he later changed his name to Ono Manzō (大野 萬蔵). In the summer of 1930, he was scouted by Isegahama, former sekiwake Kiyosegawa Keinosuke, his distant relative. However, he was largely forgotten due to the disruption caused by the Shunjuen Incident of 1932, in which a large number of wrestlers went on strike. After the dispute was settled, he joined Isegahama stable in 1934, making his debut in January 1935 with the Terukuni Manzō shikona or ring name.

He was promoted to the top makuuchi division in May 1939, and reached the ōzeki rank in May 1941. After two tournaments at ōzeki, he finished in a three-way tie for the championship in May 1942 with Futabayama and Akinoumi, on 13–2. The championship was awarded to Futabayama (whom Terukuni had defeated in their individual match) simply because he was of a higher rank, as was the rule at the time. Nevertheless, after the tournament both Terukuni and Akinoumi were promoted to yokozuna. At 23 years of age, Terukuni was the youngest wrestler to reach the yokozuna rank until the promotion of Taihō in 1961. He did well in his yokozuna debut, scoring 14–1, although he finished one win behind Futabayama, who won his last match by default.

Terukuni was a heavy wrestler for his time, weighing over 160 kg (350 lb). During World War II, his weight declined due to food shortages. He changed the spelling of his shikona given name to 萬藏 in May 1945, but changed it back in October 1949.

Having been a runner-up on five previous occasions, Terukuni finally won his first championship in September 1950, about eight years after his promotion. He won his second championship in the very next tournament with a perfect 15–0 record.

Three days into the January 1953 tournament, he announced his retirement. After the tournament, Kagamisato was promoted to yokozuna, and a photograph was taken of Terukuni and Kagamisato alongside the other grand champions Chiyonoyama, Azumafuji and Haguroyama. As Terukuni had not yet had his official retirement ceremony, some regard January 1953 as being the only occasion on which there were five yokozuna at the same time.

== Retirement from sumo ==
After his retirement, Terukuni became the head coach of Isegahama stable and produced ōzeki Kiyokuni Katsuo. He had already made arrangements to pass control of the stable over to Kiyokuni at the time of his death in 1977 at the age of 58.

== Career record ==
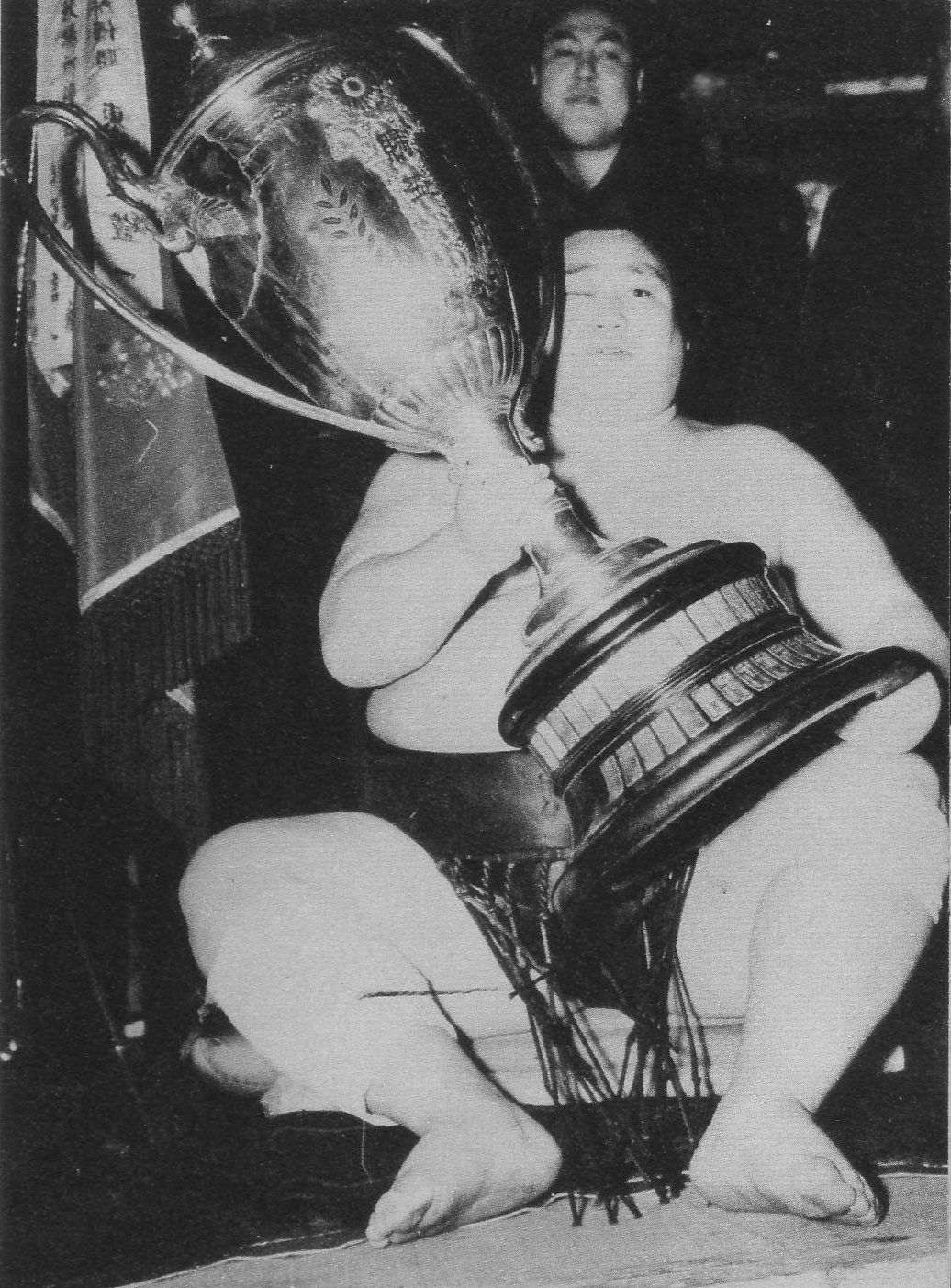
Terukuni holding the Emperor's Cup after winning the January 1951 tournament

- Through most of the 1940s only two tournaments were held a year, and in 1946 only one was held. The New Year tournament began and the Spring tournament moved to Osaka in 1953.

Terukuni Manzō
-	Spring Haru basho, Tokyo	Summer Natsu basho, Tokyo	Autumn Aki basho, Tokyo
1935	(Maezumo)	Shinjo; 1–3	Not held
1936	West Jonokuchi #4; 3–3	East Jonidan #17; 5–1	Not held
1937	West Sandanme #22; 5–1	West Makushita #21; 11–2; Champion	Not held
1938	East Jūryō #13; 6–7	West Makushita #1; 5–2	Not held
1939	East Jūryō #8; 11–2; Champion	West Maegashira #15; 11–4	Not held
1940	East Maegashira #2; 12–3 ★	East Sekiwake #2; 11–4	Not held
1941	West Sekiwake #1; 12–3	West Sekiwake #1; 13–2	Not held
1942	East Ōzeki #1; 12–3	West Ōzeki #2; 13–2	Not held
1943	East Yokozuna #2; 14–1	West Yokozuna-Ōzeki #1; 12–3	Not held
1944	East Yokozuna-Ōzeki #1; 11–4	West Yokozuna-Ōzeki #1; 6–4	West Yokozuna #1; 4–2–4
1945	Not held	East Yokozuna #1; 5–2	East Yokozuna #2; 9–1
1946	Not held	Not held	East Yokozuna #1; 3–3–7
1947	Not held	West Yokozuna #1; 7–3	West Yokozuna #1; 7–4
1948	Not held	West Yokozuna #1; 9–2	East Yokozuna #1; 2–5–4
1949	Sat out due to injury	East Yokozuna #2; 12–3	East Yokozuna #1; 8–2–5
1950	East Yokozuna #2; 2–2–11	East Yokozuna #2; 11–4	East Yokozuna #2; 13–2
1951	East Yokozuna #1; 15–0	East Yokozuna #1; 10–5	West Yokozuna #1; 11–4
1952	West Yokozuna #1; 10–5	East Yokozuna #2; Sat out due to injury 0–0–15	West Yokozuna #2; 6–6–3
Record given as wins–losses–absences Top division champion Top division runner-up Retired Lower divisions Non-participation Sanshō key: F=Fighting spirit; O=Outstanding performance; T=Technique Also shown: ★=Kinboshi; P=Playoff(s); Divisions: Makuuchi — Jūryō — Makushita — Sandanme — Jonidan — Jonokuchi Makuuchi ranks: Yokozuna — Ōzeki — Sekiwake — Komusubi — Maegashira

-	New Year Hatsu basho, Tokyo	Spring Haru basho, Osaka	Summer Natsu basho, Tokyo	Autumn Aki basho, Tokyo
1953	East Yokozuna #2; Retired; 0–3–12	x	x	x
Record given as wins–losses–absences Top division champion Top division runner-up Retired Lower divisions Non-participation Sanshō key: F=Fighting spirit; O=Outstanding performance; T=Technique Also shown: ★=Kinboshi; P=Playoff(s); Divisions: Makuuchi — Jūryō — Makushita — Sandanme — Jonidan — Jonokuchi Makuuchi ranks: Yokozuna — Ōzeki — Sekiwake — Komusubi — Maegashira

== See also ==
- Glossary of sumo terms
- List of past sumo wrestlers
- List of sumo tournament top division champions
- List of yokozuna

Preceded by Akinoumi Setsuo	38th Yokozuna; 1942–1953	Succeeded by Maedayama Eigorō
Yokozuna is not a successive rank, and more than one wrestler can hold the title at once
