= Oginohana Akikazu =

Japanese sumo wrestler

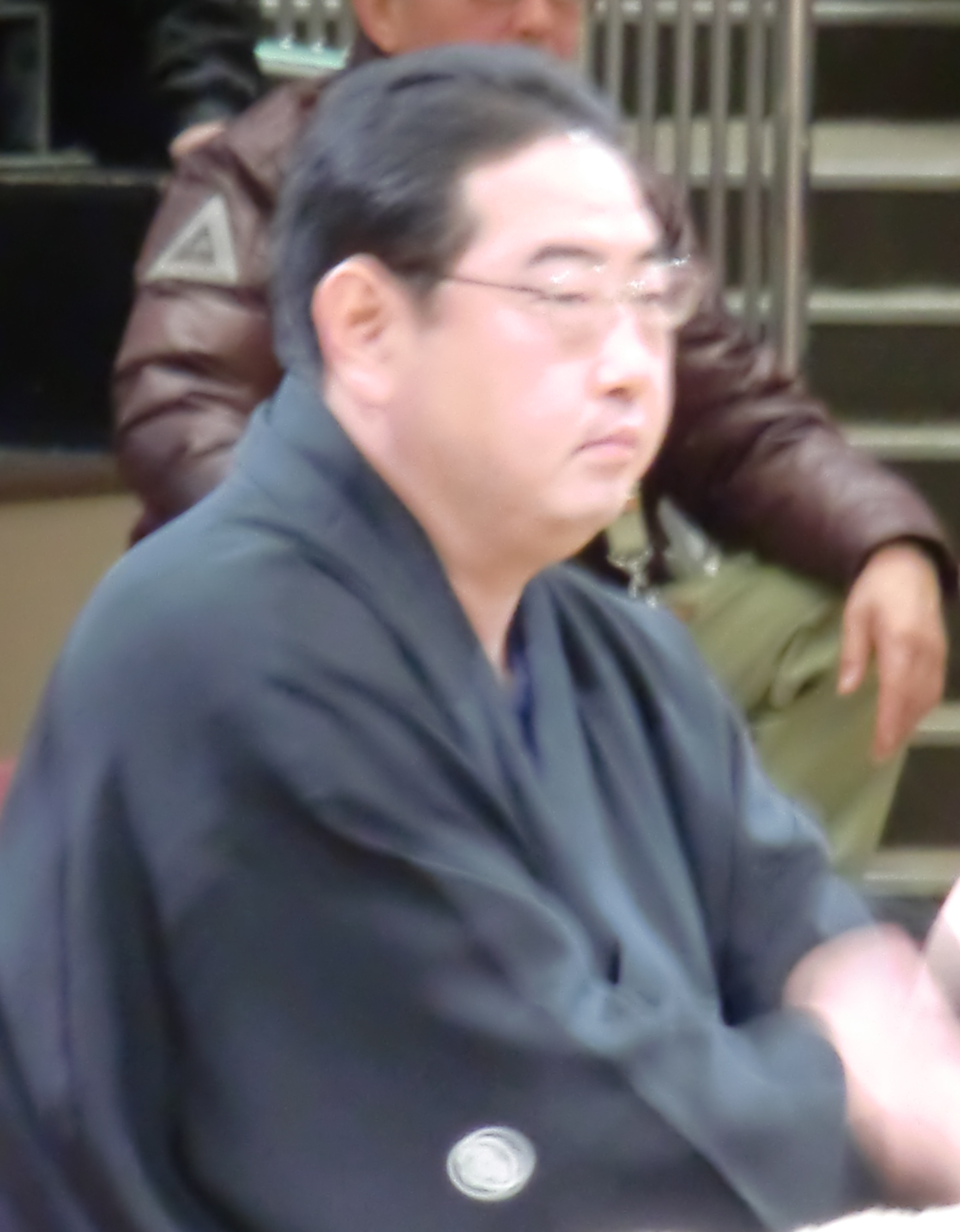

Personal information
- Native name: 小城乃花 昭和
- Born: Akikazu Koiwai; 18 November 1967 (age 58) Ichikawa, Chiba, Japan
- Height: 1.89 m (6 ft 2 1/2 in)
- Weight: 132 kg (291 lb)

Sport
- Sport: Sumo
- Retired: July, 1998
- Heya: Dewanoumi
- Record: 540-491-39
- Debut: July, 1983
- Highest rank: Maegashira 2 (May, 1990)
- Elder name: Dewanoumi
- Championships: 4 (Jūryō); 1 (Makushita)
- Updated on August 2012

Oginohana Akikazu (born 18 November 1967 as Akikazu Koiwai) is a former sumo wrestler from Ichikawa, Chiba, Japan. He made his professional debut in July 1983, and reached the top division in January 1990. His highest rank was maegashira 2. He retired in July 1998. He is the son of former sekiwake Oginohana Masaaki and the elder brother of former komusubi Oginishiki. Since 2014 he has been the head of the Dewanoumi stable.

== Career ==
He had not shown much interest in sumo while at high school and was instead a member of the baseball team. However, while recuperating from a baseball injury he was persuaded to drop out of school and join Dewanoumi stable where his father, the former sekiwake Oginohana Masaaki, worked as a coach. Initially fighting under his family name of Koiwai, he made his professional debut in July 1983. He adopted his father's shikona or fighting name in March 1987. In the same tournament his younger brother joined the stable and began using the family name as a shikona instead (he later became Oginishiki). As he rose up the ranks Oginohana's strong and supple physique, and the power of his right arm overarm throw, were much admired. He bore a physical resemblance to former yokozuna Wakanohana II, and like him was popular with female sumo fans. He won the makushita division championship in May 1988 and reached sekitori level upon promotion to the jūryō division in July 1989. He took the jūryō division championship with a 13-2 record in November 1989 and was promoted to the top makuuchi division for the following tournament in January 1990.

Both Oginohana and his friend and stablemate, Ryūkōzan, came through with winning records in their makuuchi debuts, but Ryūkōzan collapsed and died of a heart attack during a training session a few weeks later. Oginohana seemed to lose a good deal of his fighting spirit after this incident. His expected rise to the san'yaku ranks never materialized, and he never won a sanshō or special prize. Twice he was in a position when he would have been awarded the Fighting Spirit Prize if he had won on the final day of the tournament, but on both occasions he lost (to Terao on his top division debut in January 1990 and Takahanada in March 1991). He fell down to jūryō on a couple of occasions, and ended up winning the jūryō championship four times, second only to Masurao's five. His last appearance in the top division was in March 1996, and he retired in July 1998 when he lost thirteen bouts and was certain to be demoted to the makushita division. His top division record was 169 wins to 216 losses with 5 absences, a winning percentage of .439, and his highest rank was maegashira 2, achieved in May 1990.

== Retirement from sumo ==
Oginohana remained in the sumo world as a coach at Dewanoumi stable and an elder of the Japan Sumo Association. For two years after his retirement he had jun-tosiyori status and used his old fighting name (a practice since abolished), but in 2000 he became Takasaki-oyakata, succeeding his father who had reached the mandatory retirement age for coaches of 65 years old. In February 2014 he became the head coach of Dewanoumi stable, succeeding former sekiwake Washūyama who was also nearing retirement age. He is also a judge of tournament bouts and has deputized for chief judges Kasugano and Fujishima. In January 2016 he was elected to the Sumo Association's board of directors.

Oginohana was one of seven wrestlers born in the 1967–1968 school year to reach the top division, the others being Ryūkōzan, Daishōhō, Takatōriki, Mainoumi, Kenkō and Terunoumi, but he is the only one of those seven still involved in sumo, with Mainoumi choosing to leave upon his retirement, Takatōriki being expelled, and the other four all being deceased. In addition, none of those seven became yokozuna or ōzeki, and in Japan they are compared unfavourably with their contemporaries from professional baseball where "Kuwata–Kiyohara Generation" is regarded as a golden age.

On 4 July 2019 Dewanoumi Oyakata collapsed at a training session whilst supervising jonokuchi wrestlers. It was diagnosed as variant angina and he was saved by the availability of an automated external defibrillator, which was required by the Sumo Association to be installed at every stable following the death of his stablemate Ryūkozan in 1990. He returned to work on 9 July.

== Fighting style ==
Oginohana was a yotsu-sumo wrestler who preferred grappling techniques to pushing and thrusting. His favoured grip on the mawashi was hidari yotsu, a right hand outside, left hand inside position. His speciality was uwatenage, or overarm throw.

== Career record ==
Oginohana Akikazu
Year	January Hatsu basho, Tokyo	March Haru basho, Osaka	May Natsu basho, Tokyo	July Nagoya basho, Nagoya	September Aki basho, Tokyo	November Kyūshū basho, Fukuoka
1983	x	x	x	(Maezumo)	East Jonokuchi #54; 1–2–4	West Jonokuchi #44; Sat out due to injury 0–0–7
1984	West Jonokuchi #44; 6–1–P	East Jonidan #90; 2–5	West Jonidan #119; 3–4	West Jonidan #133; 5–2	West Jonidan #96; 4–3	East Jonidan #64; 3–4
1985	West Jonidan #81; 6–1	West Jonidan #14; 3–4	West Jonidan #32; 4–3	West Jonidan #14; 5–2	East Sandanme #78; 4–3	West Sandanme #59; 4–3
1986	East Sandanme #42; 4–3	West Sandanme #22; 3–4	West Sandanme #37; 6–1	East Makushita #56; 2–5	East Sandanme #19; 3–4	West Sandanme #29; 3–4
1987	East Sandanme #40; 5–2	East Sandanme #16; 5–2	West Makushita #52; 4–3	West Makushita #39; Sat out due to injury 0–0–7	East Sandanme #20; 5–2	East Makushita #53; 3–4
1988	East Sandanme #7; 6–1	East Makushita #37; 4–3	Makushita #29; 7–0; Champion	East Makushita #5; 5–2	East Makushita #1; 3–4	West Makushita #3; 4–3
1989	East Makushita #2; 3–4	West Makushita #5; 5–2	East Makushita #1; 4–3	East Jūryō #13; 10–5	East Jūryō #7; 8–7	West Jūryō #6; 13–2; Champion
1990	West Maegashira #11; 9–6	East Maegashira #7; 8–7	East Maegashira #2; 4–11	East Maegashira #11; 5–10	West Jūryō #2; 11–4–P; Champion	East Maegashira #11; 5–10
1991	West Jūryō #2; 12–3–P	East Maegashira #14; 10–5	West Maegashira #6; 6–9	West Maegashira #10; 7–8	West Maegashira #11; 5–10	East Jūryō #2; 8–7
1992	West Jūryō #1; 11–4	West Maegashira #11; 6–9	West Maegashira #13; 9–6	West Maegashira #8; 8–5–2	West Maegashira #3; 5–7–3	West Maegashira #9; 8–7
1993	East Maegashira #8; 8–7	East Maegashira #4; 5–10	West Maegashira #10; 9–6	East Maegashira #3; 4–11	West Maegashira #9; 7–8	West Maegashira #12; 4–11
1994	West Jūryō #4; 5–10	East Jūryō #9; 11–4	West Jūryō #3; 12–3; Champion	West Maegashira #14; 7–8	East Jūryō #2; 9–6	West Maegashira #15; 6–9
1995	East Jūryō #3; 10–5	West Jūryō #1; 7–8	West Jūryō #3; 10–5	East Jūryō #1; 6–9	West Jūryō #4; 11–4	East Maegashira #15; 9–6
1996	East Maegashira #11; 8–7	East Maegashira #2; 3–12	West Maegashira #11; 4–11	West Jūryō #3; 8–7	East Jūryō #2; 6–9	West Jūryō #5; 7–8
1997	West Jūryō #6; 10–5	East Jūryō #3; 9–6	East Jūryō #1; 4–11	West Jūryō #7; 7–8	West Jūryō #8; 12–3; Champion	West Jūryō #2; 4–11
1998	West Jūryō #8; 9–6	West Jūryō #4; Sat out due to injury 0–0–15	West Jūryō #4; 6–9	East Jūryō #8; Retired; 1–13–1	x	x
Record given as wins–losses–absences Top division champion Top division runner-up Retired Lower divisions Non-participation Sanshō key: F=Fighting spirit; O=Outstanding performance; T=Technique Also shown: ★=Kinboshi; P=Playoff(s); Divisions: Makuuchi — Jūryō — Makushita — Sandanme — Jonidan — Jonokuchi Makuuchi ranks: Yokozuna — Ōzeki — Sekiwake — Komusubi — Maegashira

== See also ==
- Glossary of sumo terms
- List of past sumo wrestlers
- List of sumo elders
- List of sumo tournament second division champions
