= Nishonoseki stable (1911–2013) =

Stable of sumo wrestlers

Nishonoseki stable (二所ノ関部屋, Nishonoseki-beya) (1935–2013) was a sumo stable of the Nishonoseki group.

It first appeared in the late eighteenth century and was re-established in 1935 by the 32nd yokozuna Tamanishiki while still active. The former ōzeki Saganohana produced the stable's greatest wrestler, yokozuna Taihō, who won a record for the time of 32 yūshō or tournament championships between 1961 and 1971. The stable's last head coach, sekiwake Kongō, took charge in 1976, when he was adopted by the widow of the previous head. He was also on the board of directors of the Japan Sumo Association.

The stable's fortunes declined in later years. It had no sekitori wrestlers after the retirement of Daizen in 2003 and at the end had just three active wrestlers, all in sandanme or below (and one of whom, Kasachikara, was 41 years old, and the second oldest active wrestler in sumo). The naturalisation of a Chinese born rikishi, Ryūtei, opened up another spot in the stable for a foreigner, and a Mongolian wrestler was recruited in March 2010, Kengo, but he retired in May 2011 having missed several tournaments due to suffering a traumatic brain injury.

In February 2010 general affairs manager Yoshiyuki Inoguchi, a former wrestler for the stable from 1975 to 1993 under the shikona of Nijodake, was found hanged in an apparent suicide.

The stable closed after the January 2013 tournament, due to the ill health of the stablemaster at the time and the lack of a suitable successor to him at the time. All three of its wrestlers retired, with the rest of the personnel (except Fujigane-oyakata) moving to Matsugane stable.

The name of the stable was written in three-storey-high characters down the front of the building. It has since been demolished to make way for apartment blocks. But was later reformed in 2021 after an 8-year dormancy Nishonoseki stable (2021) in a new place and location.

== Owners ==
- 1976–2013: 10th Nishonoseki (sekiwake Kongō Masahiro)
- 1975–1976: 9th Nishonoseki (maegashira Tokachiiwa Yutaka)
- 1952–1975: 8th Nishonoseki (ōzeki Saganohana Katsumi)
- 1938–1952: 7th Nishonoseki (sekiwake Tamanoumi Umekichi)
- 1935–1938: 6th Nishonoseki (32nd yokozuna Tamanishiki San'emon)

== Coaches ==
- Kitajin (sekiwake Kirinji)
- Minatogawa (komusubi Daitetsu)
- Fujigane (komusubi Daizen)

== Notable members ==
- Taihō (48th yokozuna)
- Daikirin (ōzeki)
- Saganohana (ōzeki)
- Rikidōzan (sekiwake)
- Tamanoumi (sekiwake)
- Kongō (sekiwake)
- Kamikaze (sekiwake)
- Hasegawa / Junzo Kamiwaka / Yoshinosato

== Referee ==
- Shinnosuke Shikimori (Hiromitsu Oshida) - jūryō referee

== See also ==
- List of sumo stables
- List of sumo elders
- List of active sumo wrestlers
- List of past sumo wrestlers
- List of years in sumo
- Glossary of sumo terms
