= Kirinji Kazuharu =

Japanese sumo wrestler (1953–2021)

Personal information
- Native name: 麒麟児 和春
- Born: Kazuharu Tarusawa; 9 March 1953 Chiba, Japan
- Died: 1 March 2021 (aged 67)
- Height: 1.82 m (5 ft 11 1/2 in)
- Weight: 144 kg (317 lb)

Sport
- Sport: Sumo
- Retired: September, 1988
- Heya: Nishonoseki
- Record: 773-792-34
- Debut: May, 1967
- Highest rank: Sekiwake (July, 1975)
- Elder name: Kitajin
- Championships: 1 (Jūryō); 2 (Makushita)
- Special Prizes: Outstanding Performance(4); Fighting Spirit (4); Technique (3)
- Gold Stars: 6 Mienoumi (2); Wajima; Kitanoumi; Wakanohana II; Ōnokuni
- Updated on June 2020

Kirinji Kazuharu, real name Kazuharu Tarusawa (9 March 1953 – 1 March 2021) was a sumo wrestler from Kashiwa, Chiba Prefecture, Japan. He made his professional debut in 1967, reaching the top makuuchi division in 1974. His highest rank was sekiwake. During his long career he won several awards and set a number of longevity records. Upon his retirement in 1988 he became a sumo coach and elder of the Japan Sumo Association, until reaching 65 years of age in 2018.

== Career ==
He made his professional debut in May 1967 at the age of just 14, joining Nishonoseki stable. At first he fought under his own surname of Tarusawa, before adopting the shikona of Kirinji in January 1974 upon promotion to the second highest jūryō division. The shikona had previously been used by one of his stablemates, ozeki Daikirin.

Kirinji reached the top makuuchi division in September 1974 and remained there for 84 tournaments, a record at the time second only to Takamiyama's 97. The run was not consecutive however, as he dropped to jūryō briefly in November 1979 after sitting out the previous tournament through injury. He fought in 1221 top division bouts in total, the eleventh highest in history. He spent ten tournaments at komusubi rank, the first in March 1975 and the last thirteen years later in January 1988, making him one of the oldest postwar sanyaku wrestlers. He reached his highest rank of sekiwake for the first time in July 1975 and held it on seven occasions in total. He never won a top division tournament but was a runner-up on two occasions, to Kitanoumi in September 1978 and to Chiyonofuji in March 1982. He won eleven sanshō, or special prizes, placing him joint tenth on the all-time list, and earned six kinboshi or gold stars for defeating yokozuna. His last kinboshi against Onokuni in May 1988 came just two tournaments before his retirement.

His spirited match with Fujizakura in May 1975 was particularly memorable and was enjoyed by Emperor Shōwa, a noted sumo fan. After fierce thrusting attacks from both sides, Kirinji eventually won the bout with an uwatenage, or outer arm throw. He was awarded the Fighting Spirit prize at the end of that tournament. The bout was later released on DVD as one of the "Best Matches in the 20th Century."

== Retirement from sumo ==
Two days into the September 1988 tournament, where at 35 years of age he was the oldest in his division, Kirinji pulled out with a knee injury. He announced his retirement from sumo on the 14th day. He remained in the sumo world as a coach at Nishonoseki stable under the elder name Kitajin Oyakata. Although the stable closed in January 2013, the stable to which he moved, Matsugane, was renamed Nishonoseki stable in 2014. He reached the mandatory retirement age for coaches of 65 in March 2018 and left the Japan Sumo Association. On 13 April 2021, the Sumo Association announced that he had died of multiple organ failure on 1 March at the age of 67.

== Career record ==
Kirinji Kazuharu
Year	January Hatsu basho, Tokyo	March Haru basho, Osaka	May Natsu basho, Tokyo	July Nagoya basho, Nagoya	September Aki basho, Tokyo	November Kyūshū basho, Fukuoka
1967	x	x	(Maezumo)	(Maezumo)	East Jonokuchi #14; 3–4	East Jonokuchi #5; 3–4
1968	West Jonidan #125; 4–3	East Jonidan #85; 2–5	East Jonidan #98; 5–2	West Jonidan #55; 3–4	West Jonidan #62; 3–4	West Jonidan #66; 3–4
1969	East Jonidan #70; 6–1	West Jonidan #15; 4–3	West Sandanme #95; 3–4	West Sandanme #99; 3–4	East Jonidan #10; 5–2	East Sandanme #78; 6–1
1970	West Sandanme #36; 1–6	East Sandanme #64; 3–4	West Sandanme #69; 4–3	East Sandanme #46; 6–1	East Sandanme #14; 2–5	East Sandanme #32; 5–2
1971	East Sandanme #3; 4–3	West Makushita #52; 6–1	East Makushita #24; 4–3	West Makushita #18; 4–3	East Makushita #16; 2–5	East Makushita #31; 5–2
1972	East Makushita #17; 5–2	East Makushita #7; 3–4	East Makushita #12; 4–3	East Makushita #8; 2–5	West Makushita #21; 3–4	East Makushita #28; 5–2
1973	East Makushita #14; 4–3	West Makushita #11; 3–4	West Makushita #15; 3–4	East Makushita #21; 3–4	West Makushita #30; 7–0; Champion	East Makushita #2; 7–0; Champion
1974	East Jūryō #9; 8–7	East Jūryō #7; 6–9	West Jūryō #10; 9–6	West Jūryō #2; 12–3; Champion	East Maegashira #9; 9–6	East Maegashira #5; 8–7
1975	East Maegashira #1; 10–5; F★	East Komusubi #1; 8–7; T	East Komusubi #1; 9–6; F	West Sekiwake #1; 8–7	West Sekiwake #2; 8–7; O	East Sekiwake #2; 7–8
1976	West Maegashira #1; 4–11	East Maegashira #8; 6–9	East Maegashira #11; 10–5	West Maegashira #4; 11–4; TO★★	East Sekiwake #1; 8–7; O	East Sekiwake #2; 5–10
1977	West Maegashira #3; 6–9	West Maegashira #6; 8–7	East Maegashira #3; 4–7–4	West Maegashira #9; 9–6	East Maegashira #4; 8–7	West Komusubi #1; 3–12
1978	East Maegashira #8; 9–6	West Maegashira #2; 4–11	East Maegashira #10; 11–4	West Maegashira #1; 5–10	West Maegashira #5; 12–3; T	East Komusubi #1; 8–7; O
1979	West Sekiwake #1; 8–7	West Sekiwake #1; 5–6–4	West Maegashira #3; 3–12	West Maegashira #12; 9–6	East Maegashira #4; Sat out due to injury 0–0–15	East Jūryō #2; 10–5
1980	East Maegashira #13; 8–7	East Maegashira #10; 11–4	West Maegashira #1; 5–10 ★	East Maegashira #4; 8–7 ★	West Komusubi #1; 7–8	West Maegashira #1; 6–9
1981	West Maegashira #4; 5–10	West Maegashira #9; 9–6	East Maegashira #4; 8–7	East Maegashira #1; 9–6	East Komusubi #2; 4–11	West Maegashira #6; 9–6
1982	East Maegashira #2; 6–9	East Maegashira #5; 11–4; F	East Komusubi #1; 2–13	West Maegashira #9; 9–6	West Maegashira #4; 4–11	East Maegashira #12; 11–4
1983	East Maegashira #2; 3–12	East Maegashira #10; 10–5	West Komusubi #1; 2–13	West Maegashira #9; 10–5	West Maegashira #1; 3–12	East Maegashira #10; 10–5
1984	East Maegashira #1; 4–11	East Maegashira #9; 11–4	East Komusubi #1; 5–10	East Maegashira #5; 8–7	East Maegashira #2; 3–12	West Maegashira #12; 8–7
1985	East Maegashira #9; 9–6	East Maegashira #4; 4–11	East Maegashira #12; 9–6	West Maegashira #6; 6–9	East Maegashira #11; 9–6	East Maegashira #2; 5–10
1986	Maegashira #8; 5–10	West Maegashira #3; 6–9	West Maegashira #8; 8–7	East Maegashira #5; 7–8	West Maegashira #6; 6–9	East Maegashira #10; 10–5
1987	East Maegashira #2; 4–11	East Maegashira #10; 9–6	West Maegashira #2; 3–12	East Maegashira #9; 9–6	East Maegashira #1; 5–10	East Maegashira #7; 9–6
1988	West Komusubi #1; 2–13	West Maegashira #7; 10–5; F	East Maegashira #1; 6–9 ★	East Maegashira #4; 3–12	East Maegashira #13; Retired; 0–2–11	x
Record given as wins–losses–absences Top division champion Top division runner-up Retired Lower divisions Non-participation Sanshō key: F=Fighting spirit; O=Outstanding performance; T=Technique Also shown: ★=Kinboshi; P=Playoff(s); Divisions: Makuuchi — Jūryō — Makushita — Sandanme — Jonidan — Jonokuchi Makuuchi ranks: Yokozuna — Ōzeki — Sekiwake — Komusubi — Maegashira

== See also ==
- Glossary of sumo terms
- List of past sumo wrestlers
- List of sumo elders
- List of sumo tournament top division runners-up
- List of sumo tournament second division champions
- List of sumo record holders
- List of sekiwake
