= Ōkido Moriemon =

Japanese sumo wrestler

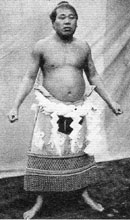
- Ōkido, circa 1912

Personal information
- Native name: 大木戸 森右衛門
- Born: Uchida Mitsuzō; November 2, 1876 Higashinada-ku, Kōbe, Hyōgo, Japan
- Died: November 7, 1930 (aged 54)
- Height: 1.78 m (5 ft 10 in)
- Weight: 125 kg (276 lb)

Sport
- Sport: Sumo
- Retired: January 1914
- Heya: Minato
- Record: 143-20-22-10draws (Makuuchi)
- Debut: September 1899
- Highest rank: Yokozuna (December 1912)
- Elder name: Minato
- Championships: 10 (Osaka makuuchi, unofficial)
- Updated on August 2008

Ōkido Moriemon (Japanese: 大木戸 森右衛門; November 2, 1878 – November 7, 1930) was a Japanese professional sumo wrestler. He was the sport's 23rd yokozuna. He was the second yokozuna to be recognised from Osaka sumo, and the only yokozuna who spent his whole active career in this city.

== Early life and career ==
His real name was Uchida Mitsuzō (内田 光蔵). Uchida was born into a family that had been in the sake barrel manufacturing business for generations. He began to be interested in sumo as a child and participated in children sumo events, reaching the rank of ōzeki in these competitions. Around 18 years-old, he participated in amateur sumo competitions while working in the Onohama Shipyards. During the Sino-Japanese War, he served in Taiwan where he met professional wrestlers from the Osaka-sumo Association. After the war, he joined Minato stable. He began his professional career in September 1899, under the shikona, or ring name, of Ōkido (大城戸) and knew a rapid ascent in the ranking. Upon promotion to makushita, he changed the spelling of his shikona to Ōkido (大木戸). Between January 1908 and May 1909, he recorded 28 consecutive wins without a single draw or hold, a rarity at the time. In 1904, at the rank of komusubi, he won a bout against Osaka yokozuna Wakashima. From that point, his popularity soared and he became sekiwake in May 1938 and then ōzeki, a rank he held for ten tournaments.

== Yokozuna promotion ==
Being in good grace in Tokyo sumo, thanks to his friendship with yokozuna Hitachiyama, Ōkido thought for a time to move to Tokyo to continue wrestling. Hitachiyama had contributed to his quick rise in the ranks by training him. However, Osaka-sumo already lost yokozuna Wakashima, who retired due to injury in 1907, and Osaka-sumo chairman and patrons heavily insisted that Ōkido stayed in Osaka-sumo. At this time the Osaka Sumo Association attempted to promote him to yokozuna, looking for the support of Tokyo's Yoshida family. After the refusal of Tokyo Sumo Association, the Osaka Sumo Association arbitrarily granted the yokozuna license on January 5, 1910. The turmoil that ensued saw both sumo associations cut ties. Later, the relations between the two associations were rebuilt and Ōkido was awarded an official yokozuna licence by the Tokyo association in December 1912.

== Retirement and death ==
Ōkido was past his prime when he was promoted to yokozuna. Later, it was found he suffered from cerebral hemorrhage. After three months of treatment at the Kure Mutual Aid Hospital, he returned to Osaka, but he was paralyzed and could not continue to wrestle, so he retired at the end of February 1914 and became head coach of his stable under the name of Minato. After his retirement he became chairman of the Osaka Sumo Association, but his health did not improve and he was unable to go to work, so he resigned in 1930. He died on October 7, 1930. The current Japan Sumo Association includes Ōkido, and four other wrestlers from the Osaka Association, in its list of past yokozuna. In his hometown, a modest stone marks his birthplace and achievements.

== Fighting style ==
He had a strong two-handed thrust, usually sending his opponents into a two-handed thrust, and even when he was in a four-way right hand, he had the advantage of hanging and throwing. At his prime, he was considered the only rikishi who could compete with Wakashima Gonshirō, the first officially recognized yokozuna in Osaka-sumo. He was the only ōzeki-ranked wrestler to defeat Wakashima twice in the main tournament of the Osaka Sumo Tournament.

== Osaka sumo top division record ==
- Osaka sumo existed independently for many years before merging with Tokyo sumo in 1926. 1–2 tournaments were held yearly, though the actual time they were held was often erratic.

Ōkido Moriemon
	First	Second
1903	West Maegashira #6; 6–3	West Maegashira #1; 6–2–1
1904	West Komusubi; 8–0–1; 1d Unofficial	West Sekiwake; 8–0–1; 1h Unofficial
1905	West Ōzeki; 9–0–1; Unofficial	West Ōzeki; 6–1–1; 2d
1906	West Ōzeki; 9–0–1; Unofficial	West Ōzeki; 8–1–1; Unofficial
1907	East Ōzeki; 3–1–4; 2h	East Ōzeki; 7–0–2; 1h
1908	East Ōzeki; 7–2–1	East Ōzeki; 9–0–1; Unofficial
1909	East Ōzeki; 9–0–1; Unofficial	East Ōzeki; 9–0–1; Unofficial
1910	East Yokozuna; 6–2–1; 1d	East Yokozuna; 8–1–1; Unofficial
1911	East Yokozuna; 7–1–1; 1d Unofficial	East Yokozuna; 6–2–2
1912	East Yokozuna; 7–1–1; 1d	Not held
1913	East Yokozuna; 5–3–2	Sat out
1914	Retired –	x
Record given as win-loss-absent Top Division Champion Top Division Runner-up Retired Lower Divisions Key:d=Draw(s) (引分); h=Hold(s) (預り); Divisions: Makuuchi — Jūryō — Makushita — Sandanme — Jonidan — Jonokuchi Makuuchi ranks: Yokozuna — Ōzeki — Sekiwake — Komusubi — Maegashira

*Championships for the best record in a tournament were not recognized or awarded in Osaka sumo before its merger with Tokyo sumo, and the unofficial championship above are historically conferred. For more information, see yūshō.

== See also ==
- Glossary of sumo terms
- List of past sumo wrestlers
- List of yokozuna

Preceded by Tachiyama Mineemon	23rd Yokozuna; 1912–1914	Succeeded by Ōtori Tanigorō
Yokozuna is not a successive rank, and more than one wrestler can hold the title at once
