= Ōtori Tanigorō =

Japanese sumo wrestler (1887–1956)

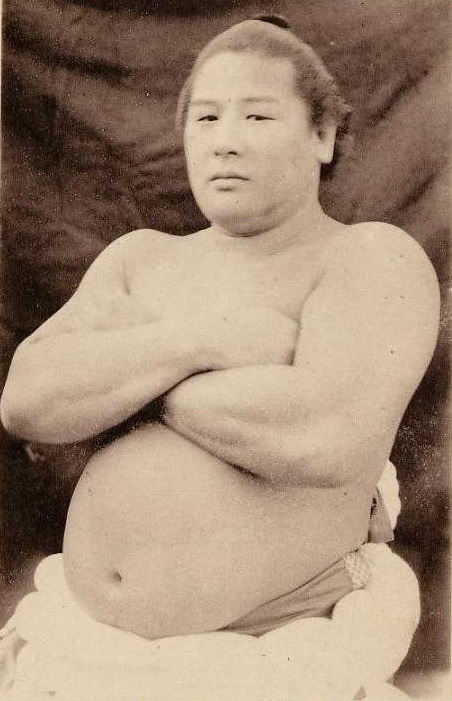

Personal information
- Native name: 鳳 谷五郎
- Born: Takita Akira; April 3, 1887 Chiba, Japan
- Died: November 16, 1956 (aged 69)
- Height: 1.74 m (5 ft 8 1/2 in)
- Weight: 113 kg (249 lb)

Sport
- Sport: Sumo
- Retired: May, 1920
- Heya: Miyagino
- Record: 107-49-68-6draws-10holds (Makuuchi)
- Debut: May, 1903
- Highest rank: Yokozuna (February, 1915)
- Elder name: Miyagino
- Championships: 2 (Makuuchi)
- Updated on June 2020

Ōtori Tanigorō (Japanese: 鳳 谷五郎; April 3, 1887 – November 16, 1956) was a Japanese professional sumo wrestler from Inzai, Chiba Prefecture. He was the sport's 24th yokozuna.

== Career ==
=== Early life and career ===
His real name was Takita Akira (瀧田 明). Son to a former professional sumo wrestler, he however had to appeal to his father to become a sumo wrestler. He joined Miyagino stable because the head coach of that time (former ōzeki Hōō) was also from Chiba Prefecture. Takita Akira made his debut in the jonokuchi division in May 1903, with his shikona name spelled Ōtori (大鳥). In May 1908, he was given the former ring name of his master, Ōtori (鳳). He quickly gained popularity because of his style and his famed beauty, calling back yokozuna Futabayama.

=== Makuuchi career ===
At the time of his makuuchi debut in 1909, he was one of the last rikishi to compete in the Ekō-in temple before the opening of the old Ryōgoku Kokugikan. During his first makuuchi tournament he was surprisingly paired against ōzeki Komagatake but managed to score a surprise victory. Ōtori knew a rapid ascent. He was promoted to san'yaku twice (in 1910 and 1911), but was rebuffed both times. In 1913 he was promoted to the second highest rank in professional sumo, ōzeki, becoming the first wrestler from Chiba Prefecture to be promoted at that rank since the promotion of his master Hōō in 1897. Ōtori won his first tournament championship in his debut tournament at the rank of ōzeki in January 1913. He was undefeated in that tournament, recording seven wins, one draw and one no decision. His second championship in January 1915, which he took with ten straight wins, saw him promoted to yokozuna. His promotion was subject to debate within the Japan Sumo Association as the Yoshida family refused him the promotion, arguing it was premature and that the promotion should be put on hold for one more tournament, but the Association pushed through, and Ōtori was given a yokozuna license. Ōkuma Shigenobu presented him a tachi, or long sword, to use during his yokozuna dohyō-iri.
However, due to injuries to his legs and diabetes, his record at sumo's highest rank was very patchy and he did not manage to win any further championships. He was the first yokozuna in history to lose all of his matches in a single tournament. His record as yokozuna was 35 wins against 24 defeats, compared with 36 wins and only four defeats at ōzeki. He retired in May 1920, after the death of his patron Yoshimizu Shigemune (president of Meidensha). In makuuchi, Ōtori won 108 bouts and lost 49, recording a winning percentage of 68.8.

== Fighting style ==
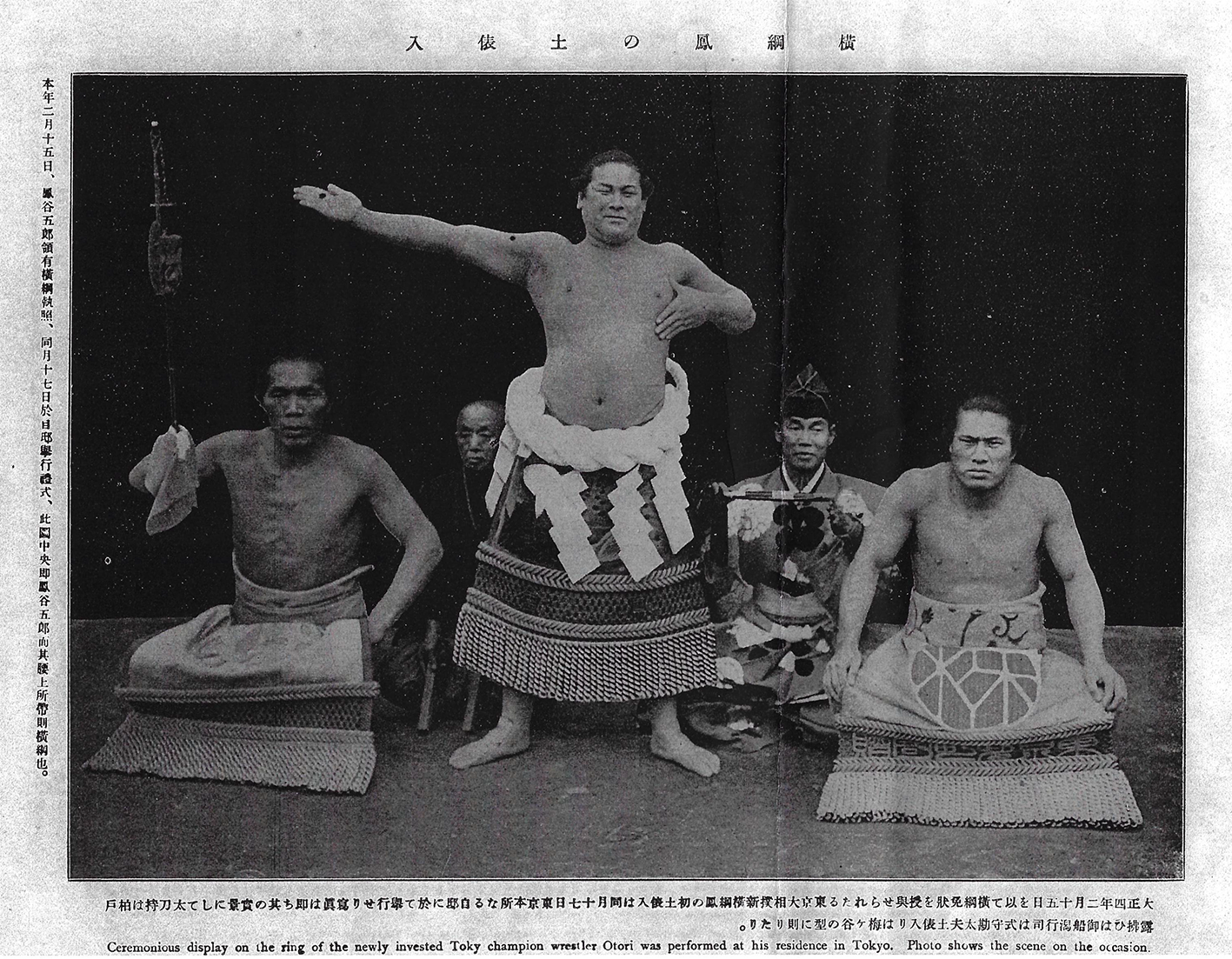
New yokozuna, Ōtori, performing his yokozuna dohyō-iri for the first time (1915).

Ōtori was known for his speedy and flamboyant modern sumo, frequently using techniques such as kakenage or katasukashi. He became popular for his distinctive style and brilliant moves amid the strict and old-fashioned top rankers of the time. His techniques earned him the nickname of Ōtori no kenken (鳳のケンケン), "hopping Ōtori". His style was however regarded as unacceptable by some, as yokozuna Hitachiyama, sumo's top performer of the time, style was regarded as both traditional and efficient.

== Retirement from sumo ==
He was head coach of Miyagino stable from 1916 until his death in 1956, succeeding in this to the former maegashira Goshoguruma. At the time, active wrestlers could both compete and train junior wrestlers under a double licence system. There was also no mandatory retirement age for elder at that time. During his coaching career, he raised maegashira Fukunosato who later became his son in law. He also served as a director on the Association's board of directors.
In 1944, Ōtori fell into alcoholism and moved back in his home prefecture of Chiba, leaving his apprentices to train in Tatsunami stable. After stepping back from his duties as an elder, he insisted that his successor had to be a yokozuna, so the Miyagino stable became inactive for a while, its wrestlers joining yokozuna Yoshibayama dojo. Eventually Yoshibayama revived the stable and assumed the Miyagino name in 1960.

== Death and homage ==
During the war, he was confined to Chiba-city because of a chronic gout. He died on November 16, 1956. On November 11, 2006, a monument to Ōtori was established in his home city of Inzai. On February 16, 2014, a one meter high cenotaph was erected and an official ceremony was held to honor him in his hometown temple of the Chokaru-ji, Inzai. His remains were still in the Takita family vault at the Enju-ji temple in Yanaka, Tokyo.

A number of Japanese public figures can today trace a family link with Ōtori, including Japanese actor Takita Sakae, who is his elder brother's grandson, and Japanese baseball player Tanaka Akira, who is his great-grandson.

== Top division record ==
Ōtori Tanigorō
-	Spring	Summer
1909	West Maegashira #10; 4–3–1; 2h	West Maegashira #2; 7–2; 1d
1910	West Sekiwake; 2–6; 2h	West Maegashira #3; 5–3–1; 1h
1911	West Komusubi; 0–3–6; 1h	West Maegashira #6; 5–1–3; 1h
1912	East Komusubi; 6–2–1; 1h	West Sekiwake; 7–1; 2d
1913	West Ōzeki; 7–0–1; 1d 1h	East Ōzeki; 8–1; 1d
1914	East Ōzeki; 8–2	West Ōzeki; 3–1–6
1915	West Ōzeki; 10–0	West Yokozuna; 2–2–6
1916	West Yokozuna; 6–3; 1d	Sat out
1917	East Yokozuna; 8–2	East Yokozuna; 3–2–5
1918	West Yokozuna; 7–3	West Yokozuna; 0–1–9
1919	West Yokozuna; 3–1–5; 1h	West Yokozuna; 3–6–1
1920	West Yokozuna; 3–4–3	East Yokozuna; Retired; 0–0–10
Record given as win-loss-absent Top Division Champion Top Division Runner-up Retired Lower Divisions Key:d=Draw(s) (引分); h=Hold(s) (預り); Divisions: Makuuchi — Jūryō — Makushita — Sandanme — Jonidan — Jonokuchi Makuuchi ranks: Yokozuna — Ōzeki — Sekiwake — Komusubi — Maegashira

== See also ==
- Glossary of sumo terms
- List of past sumo wrestlers
- List of sumo tournament top division champions
- List of yokozuna

Preceded by Ōkido Moriemon	24th Yokozuna; 1915–1920	Succeeded by Nishinoumi Kajirō II
Yokozuna is not a successive rank, and more than one wrestler can hold the title at once
