= Wakashima Gonshirō =

Japanese sumo wrestler

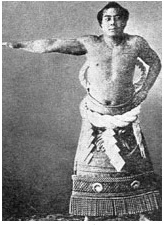

Personal information
- Native name: 若島 権四郎
- Born: Katō Daigorō; January 19, 1876 Chiba, Japan
- Died: October 23, 1943 (aged 67)
- Height: 1.78 m (5 ft 10 in)
- Weight: 116 kg (256 lb)

Sport
- Sport: Sumo
- Retired: January, 1907
- Heya: Tateyama → Tomozuna → Nakamura
- Record: 82-33-13draws (Makuuchi)
- Debut: May, 1891
- Highest rank: Yokozuna (April, 1905)
- Championships: 4 (Osaka makuuchi, unofficial)
- Updated on October 2007

Wakashima Gonshirō (Japanese: 若島 権四郎; January 19, 1876 – October 23, 1943) was a Japanese professional sumo wrestler from Ichikawa, Chiba Prefecture. He was the sport's 21st yokozuna and the first official yokozuna from the Osaka Sumo Association.

== Early life and career ==
Wakashima was born in Ichikawa-city, Chiba, under the name of Katō Daigorō (加藤大五郎). His date of birth has been dated either August 2, 1874, or January 19, 1876. Known for his large body, he was recruited by former Tokyo-sumo ōzeki Wakashima Kyūzaburō and started wrestling in Tokyo under the shikona, or ring name, of Matsuwaka (松若). His master died while he was promoted to juryō, and he had to be transferred to Tomozuna stable.

While touring in Ōgaki, Gifu Prefecture, he was hit by the Great Nōbi Earthquake and was only alive thanks to the efforts of his brother, Tatekō, who died in the earthquake. To pay homage to his brother, Matsuwaka changed his shikona to Tatekō (楯甲). He reached the top makuuchi division in 1896, peaking at maegashira 7 and never reaching sanyaku.

Tatekō was really popular among the public. Being renown as handsome, and having a good voice, he was popular with the ladies and was a regular member of the pleasure quarters. This affected his training and Tatekō never practiced much. In the hope of arousing a burst of pride in Tatekō, his master transmitted to him his master's old shikona: Wakashima (若島). After he contracted smallpox and was unable to budge, he escaped from Tokyo-sumo, cut his topknot, and entered the Kusakaze stable in Kyoto, then moved to the Nakamura stable in Osaka, where he settled.

In the Osaka Sumo Association, Wakashima ascended rapidly. He was quickly promoted to komusubi and reached the ōzeki rank in 1901.

== Yokozuna career ==
In 1903, he was granted a yokozuna license by the Yoshida family. At the time he was the only wrestler active in Osaka sumo to ever receive this recognition. It is believed he was awarded an unofficial Osaka Sumo Association yokozuna license by the Gojō family in January 1903, though the evidence of this actually occurring is obscure. In June 1903, he fought against wrestlers from the Tokyo Sumo Association. He gave a very strong performance, defeating yokozuna Umegatani Tōtarō II and emerged as a threat to the dominance of the strongest yokozuna in Tokyo sumo, Hitachiyama.

== Retirement from sumo ==
Following a bicycle accident in 1905, he contracted a head injury and declared himself kyūjō for the whole of 1906. In 1907, his condition worsened to the point that his brain would not support a bout against another yokozuna and Wakashima chose to retire. After his retirement, he once became a chairman of the Osaka Sumo Association, but soon after, he chose to run a theatrical troupe and became an entertainer. However, management was left roughly to others, and by the beginning of the Taishō era (1912-1926), he had reached the end of his touring activities. In 1925, he was elected as a town councilor of Yonago, Tottori Prefecture. On his way to the Sumo Association in Tokyo, he suffered a cerebral hemorrhage in Kobe and died on October 23, 1943.

== Fighting style ==
Although he was not able to beat Tokyo yokozuna Hitachiyama, he had gained enough strength to be able to compete with Ōzutsu and Umegatani on equal footing and is considered a leading figure in the revival of Osaka-sumo. His flashy ring style, which included powerful pulling throws, and the sharpness of his strong thrusts, made him a threat even to Tokyo-sumo top wrestlers.

== Top division record ==
=== Tokyo sumo top division record ===
Wakashima
-	Spring	Summer
1896	West Maegashira #12; 4–2–1; 3d	West Maegashira #7; 1–7–1; 1h
1897	West Maegashira #12; 1–7–2	West Maegashira #14; 4–5–1
1898	West Maegashira #13; 3–5–1; 1d	Sat out
Record given as win-loss-absent Top Division Champion Top Division Runner-up Retired Lower Divisions Key:d=Draw(s) (引分); h=Hold(s) (預り); Divisions: Makuuchi — Jūryō — Makushita — Sandanme — Jonidan — Jonokuchi Makuuchi ranks: Yokozuna — Ōzeki — Sekiwake — Komusubi — Maegashira

=== Osaka sumo top division record ===
- Osaka sumo existed independently for many years before merging with Tokyo sumo in 1926. 1–2 tournaments were held yearly, though the actual time they were held was often erratic.
- In his first Osaka tournament Wakashima competed at makuuchi, but was unranked.

Wakashima Gonshiro
	First	Second
1898	Maegashira; 4–1–3; 1d	West Maegashira #12; 7–2
1899	West Maegashira #8; 7–1–1	Not held
1900	West Komusubi; 7–0–1; 1d 1h Unofficial	Not held
1901	West Ōzeki; 7–0–1; 1h Unofficial	Not held
1902	East Ōzeki; 8–0; 1h Unofficial	Not held
1903	East Yokozuna; 8–1	East Yokozuna; 4–0–4; 1d
1904	East Yokozuna; 6–1–2	East Yokozuna; 7–1–1; 1d
1905	Sat out	East Yokozuna; 8–0–1; 1d Unofficial
1906	Sat out	Sat out
1907	Retired –	x
Record given as win-loss-absent Top Division Champion Top Division Runner-up Retired Lower Divisions Key:d=Draw(s) (引分); h=Hold(s) (預り); Divisions: Makuuchi — Jūryō — Makushita — Sandanme — Jonidan — Jonokuchi Makuuchi ranks: Yokozuna — Ōzeki — Sekiwake — Komusubi — Maegashira

*Championships for the best record in a tournament were not recognized or awarded in Osaka sumo before its merger with Tokyo sumo, and the unofficial championships above are historically conferred. For more information, see yūshō.

== See also ==
- Glossary of sumo terms
- List of past sumo wrestlers
- List of yokozuna

Preceded by Umegatani Tōtarō II	21st Yokozuna; 1905–1907	Succeeded by Tachiyama Mineemon
Yokozuna is not a successive rank, and more than one wrestler can hold the title at once
