= Ōzutsu Man'emon =

Japanese sumo wrestler

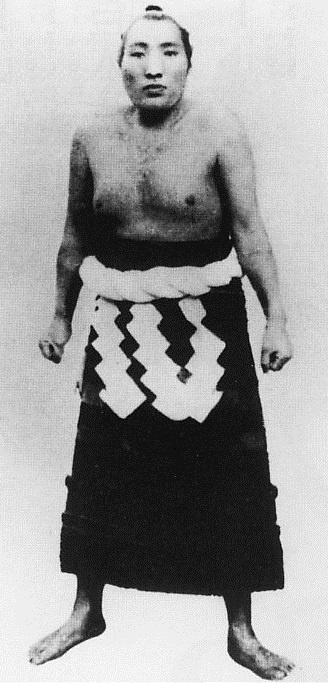

Personal information
- Native name: 大砲 万右衛門
- Born: Kakubari Manji; 30 December 1869 Miyagi, Japan
- Died: 27 May 1918 (aged 48)
- Height: 1.97 m (6 ft 5 1/2 in)
- Weight: 131 kg (289 lb)

Sport
- Sport: Sumo
- Retired: January 1908
- Heya: Oguruma
- Record: 98-29-138-51draws-4holds (Makuuchi)
- Debut: January 1885
- Highest rank: Yokozuna (April 1901)
- Elder name: Matsuchiyama
- Championships: 2 (Makuuchi, unofficial)
- Updated on October 2007

Ōzutsu Man'emon (大砲 万右衛門; 30 December 1869 – 27 May 1918) was a Japanese professional sumo wrestler from Shiroishi, Miyagi Prefecture. He was the sport's 18th yokozuna.

== Early life and career ==
His real name was Kakubari Manji (角張 萬次), before changing his given name to Man'emon (萬右衛門). He was born in Misawa, Otakazawa in present-day Shiroishi City, and was called "Monster child of Misawa" (三沢の怪童, "Misawa no Kaidai"). Kakubari was known for his large and strong body, and, at the age of 13, it was said that he could easily carry two bales of rice.
At an unknown age he was spotted by the wife of a former rikishi of the Isenoumi stable, who heard rumors of the boy's excellent physique, and in the spring of 1884 he moved to Tokyo and joined the Oguruma stable at age 17. Despite his outward appearance, he was reputed as a fine-tuned, quick-witted man, good at arithmetic and a good debater. He was also a good salesman during the traveling tournaments. In professional sumo, he began using the shikona, or ring name, Misawataki (三沢滝) in May 1884 in honour of his hometown. Ōzutsu was tall compared to other wrestlers of his time, but when he first joined his stable, his legs and back were so weak that he was ridiculed and nicknamed konnyaku (コンニャク, solidified jelly).
Through training, he was rapidly promoted and changed his shikona to Ōzutsu (大砲) in 1888. Ōzutsu was promoted to juryō in 1892. Having scored a make-kochi record (3 wins and 6 losses), he was however promoted thanks to the impression he left on the crowds thanks to his size. Ōzutsu reached sekiwake only three tournaments after entering the top makuuchi division. His strength increased and he was promoted to ōzeki in May 1899.

== Yokozuna career ==
He had never lost any bouts as ōzeki and was awarded a yokozuna licence by the Yoshida family in April 1901. In May 1902, he had the best record in the tournament with no defeats. At some point, he was advised to assume the ring name of past yokozuna Tanikaze Kajinosuke, which was supposed to be his legacy within the Tokyo Sumo Association since both of them were from Miyagi Prefecture, but he declined saying that he did not want to become a laughingstock in the future.
However, his strength rapidly declined after taking part in the Russo-Japanese War. He was absent for three tournaments due to the war.

== Fighting style ==
Despite being gifted with a great strength of body, Ōzutsu struggled at the beginning of his career, and people said "he was clumsy and weak in the waist" and "could never win a bout because he was too big for his own good". With time, he began to take advantage of his strength by prodding from afar and pulling in slowly. While not being an agile person, he developed a method preventing his adversary to stand up, he would catch them with his favoured right hand grip and hold them down, never letting go.

== Retirement and death ==
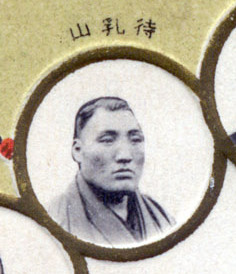
Ōzutsu on a commemorative postcard depicting the first Ryōgoku Kokugikan in 1909

After his return from the war, his chronic rheumatism had worsened and Ōzutsu sat out the 1907 second tournament. He chose to retire in the next year, assuming the name of Matsuchiyama. In his retirement speech, he said that former yokozuna Umegatani Tōtarō I had taught him that a yokozuna must not be defeated. In the top makuuchi division, he won 98 bouts and lost 29 bouts, recording a winning percentage of 77.2. He also recorded 51 draws. In 1915, he was hospitalized with a stomach ulcer on his back and became seriously ill. He died on May 27, 1918, of diabetes that he developed after the surgery at 48 years old.
His grave is located in the premises of the Ekō-in temple in Tokyo.

== Homage ==
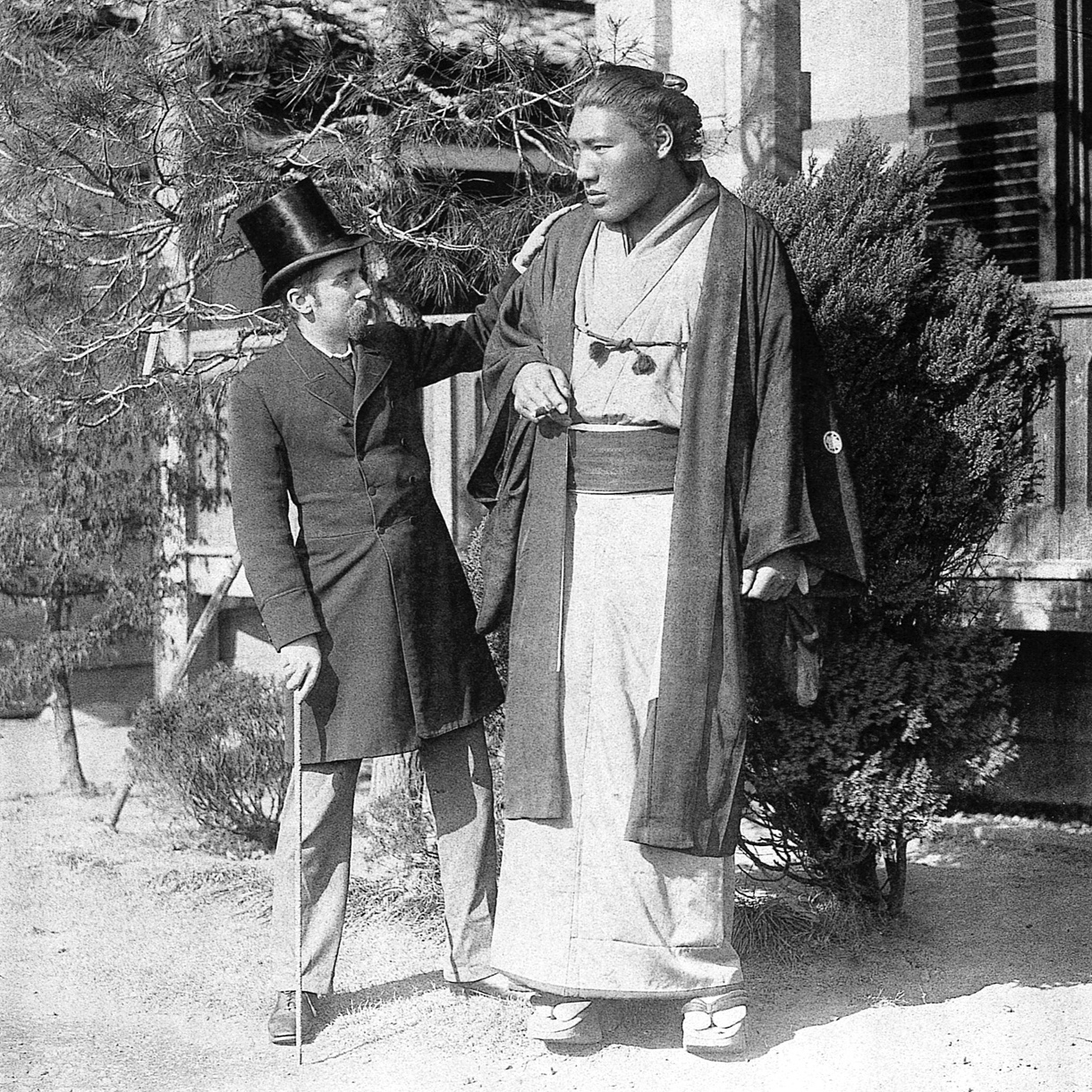
Then-komusubi Ōzutsu and William K. Burton in 1895.

A bronze statue of Ōzutsu was erected at the ruins of Shiroishi Castle, Shiroishi, Miyagi.

== Top division record ==
Ozutsu
-	Spring	Summer
1892	x	West Maegashira #6; 3–6–1
1893	Sat out	West Maegashira #2; 5–4–1
1894	West Sekiwake; 2–2–6	West Maegashira #1; 4–2–2; 2d
1895	West Komusubi; 2–1–7	West Komusubi; 7–0–2; 1d Unofficial
1896	West Sekiwake; 3–1–5; 1d	Sat out
1897	West Maegashira #1; 6–2–1; 1d	West Komusubi; 4–3–1; 2d
1898	West Komusubi; 4–0–2; 4d	West Sekiwake; 6–0–2; 2d
1899	West Sekiwake; 4–1–1; 4d	West Ōzeki; 1–0–6; 2d 1h
1900	Sat out due to injury 0–0–15	West Ōzeki; 6–0–1; 2d 1h
1901	West Ōzeki; 7–0–2; 1d	East Yokozuna; 6–1–1; 1draw 1h
1902	East Yokozuna; 6–2–1; 1d	East Yokozuna; 8–0–1; 1d Unofficial
1903	East Yokozuna; 7–1–1; 1d	Sat out for military service
1904	Sat out for military service	Sat out for military service
1905	East Yokozuna; 3–1–5; 1h	East Yokozuna; 2–1–1; 6d
1906	East Yokozuna; 1–0–1; 8d	Sat out
1907	East Yokozuna; 1–1–6; 2d	East Yokozuna; 0–0–1; 9d
1908	East Yokozuna; Retired; 0–0	x
Record given as win-loss-absent Top Division Champion Top Division Runner-up Retired Lower Divisions Key:d=Draw(s) (引分); h=Hold(s) (預り); Divisions: Makuuchi — Jūryō — Makushita — Sandanme — Jonidan — Jonokuchi Makuuchi ranks: Yokozuna — Ōzeki — Sekiwake — Komusubi — Maegashira

*Championships for the best record in a tournament were not recognised or awarded before the 1909 summer tournament and the above unofficial championships are historically conferred. For more information see yūshō.

== See also ==
- Glossary of sumo terms
- List of past sumo wrestlers
- List of yokozuna

Preceded by Konishiki Yasokichi I	18th Yokozuna; 1901–1908	Succeeded by Hitachiyama Taniemon
Yokozuna is not a successive rank, and more than one wrestler can hold the title at once
