= List of yokozuna =

Yokozuna is the highest rank of sumo wrestling. It was not recorded on the banzuke until 1890 and was not officially recognised as sumo's highest rank until 1909. Until then, yokozuna was merely a license given to certain ōzeki to perform the dohyō-iri ceremony. It was not always the strongest ōzeki but those with the most influential patrons who were chosen.

The first list of yokozuna (with 17 names in total) was compiled by the 12th yokozuna Jinmaku Kyūgorō in 1900 but was not regarded as official until 1926 when it was published by the newly formed Japan Sumo Association and updated to 31 names. Since that time, 44 more yokozuna have been promoted. The Sumo Association has overseen all promotions since Chiyonoyama's in 1951. Two consecutive tournament championships or an "equivalent performance" at ōzeki level are the minimum requirement for promotion to yokozuna in modern sumo.

The longest serving yokozuna ever was Hakuhō, who was promoted in 2007 and retired in 2021.

The number of top division championships (yūshō) won by each yokozuna is also listed. Those listed for yokozuna active before the summer tournament of 1909 are historically conferred from the win–loss records of the time as no system of championships existed up to this time.

== List ==
?	Information is uncertain
†	Wrestler died as yokozuna
¤	Elder left their position early and quit the Sumo Association

No.	Name		Yūshō	Stable (Note: At the time of promotion)	Home town (Note: Modernized, as listed by the Japan Sumo Association)	Promoted (Note: Yokozuna was not listed as a rank on the banzuke until 1890, so all promotion dates from the 4th yokozuna Tanikaze until the 16th Nishinoumi Kajirō I are in fact the date they were given a yokozuna licence by House of Yoshida Tsukasa, who controlled Tokyo based sumo. The first yokozuna, Akashi Shiganosuke, was awarded the title posthumously, and little is known about the careers of Ayagawa Gorōji and Maruyama Gondazaemon. The 21st yokozuna Wakashima, the 23rd Okido, the 28th Ōnishiki Daigorō and the 29th Miyagiyama competed in the rival Osaka based sumo organisation and were initially given licences by the House of Gojo. The date given is their official acceptance by the Tokyo House.)	Retired	Style	Elder name (Note: This column shows the name used as an elder of the Japan Sumo Association after retirement. Only the final elder name is listed; other names may have been used. For example, Sadanoyama was known as Dewanoumi for much of his time as an elder, and Kitanofuji as Kokonoe.)
No.	Rōmaji	Japanese	Yūshō	Stable	Home town	Promoted	Retired	Style	Elder name
1	Akashi Shiganosuke	明石 志賀之助	—N/a	—N/a	(Tokugawa shogunate) Utsunomiya, Tochigi ?	?	1649 ? †	—N/a	None
2	Ayagawa Gorōji	綾川 五郎次	—N/a	—N/a	(Tokugawa shogunate) Tochigi ?	?	1765 ? †	—N/a	None
3	Maruyama Gondazaemon	丸山 権太左衛門	—N/a	Nanatsumori	(Tokugawa shogunate) Tome, Miyagi	1749	1749 †	—N/a	None
4	Tanikaze Kajinosuke	谷風 梶之助	21	Isenoumi	(Tokugawa shogunate) Sendai, Miyagi	1789	1795 †	—N/a	None
5	Onogawa Kisaburō	小野川 喜三郎	7	Onogawa	(Tokugawa shogunate) Ōtsu, Shiga	1789	1797	—N/a	Onogawa
6	Ōnomatsu Midorinosuke	阿武松 緑之助	5	Shikoroyama	(Tokugawa shogunate) Noto, Ishikawa	1828	1835	—N/a	Onomatsu
7	Inazuma Raigorō	稲妻 雷五郎	10	Sadogatake	(Tokugawa shogunate) Inashiki, Ibaraki	1830	1839	—N/a	None
8	Shiranui Dakuemon	不知火 諾右衛門	1	Urakaze	(Tokugawa shogunate) Uto, Kumamoto	1840	1844	—N/a	Minato
9	Hidenoyama Raigorō	秀の山 雷五郎	6	Hidenoyama	(Tokugawa shogunate) Kesennuma, Miyagi	1847	1850	—N/a	Hidenoyama
10	Unryū Kyūkichi	雲龍 久吉	7	Jinmaku	(Tokugawa shogunate) Yanagawa, Fukuoka	1861	1865	Shiranui	Oitekaze
11	Shiranui Kōemon	不知火 光右衛門	3	Sakaigawa	(Tokugawa shogunate) Matsue, Shimane	1863	1869	Unryū	Minato
12	Jinmaku Kyūgorō	陣幕 久五郎	5	Hidenoyama	(Tokugawa shogunate) Ichikawa, Chiba	1867	1867	—N/a	None
13	Kimenzan Tanigorō	鬼面山 谷五郎	7	Takekuma	(Empire of Japan) Yōrō, Gifu	1869	1870	—N/a	None
14	Sakaigawa Namiemon	境川 浪右衛門	3	Sakaigawa	(Empire of Japan) Ōzu, Kumamoto	1877	1881	—N/a	Minato
15	Umegatani Tōtarō I	梅ケ谷 藤太郎 (初代)	9	Tamagaki	(Empire of Japan) Asakura, Fukuoka	1884	1885	—N/a	Ikazuchi
16	Nishinoumi Kajirō I	西ノ海 嘉治郎 (初代)	2	Takasago	(Empire of Japan) Satsumasendai, Kagoshima	1890	1896	—N/a	Izutsu
17	Konishiki Yasokichi I	小錦 八十吉 (初代)	7	Takasago	(Empire of Japan) Yokoshibahikari, Chiba	1896	1901	—N/a	Hatachiyama
18	Ōzutsu Man'emon	大砲 万右衛門	2	Oguruma	(Empire of Japan) Shiroishi, Miyagi	1901	1908	—N/a	Matsuchiyama
19	Hitachiyama Taniemon	常陸山 谷右衛門	8	Dewanoumi	(Empire of Japan) Mito, Ibaraki	1903	1914	—N/a	Dewanoumi
20	Umegatani Tōtarō II	梅ヶ谷 藤太郎 (二代)	3	Ikazuchi	(Empire of Japan) Toyama	1903	1915	Unryū	Ikazuchi
21	Wakashima Gonshirō	若島 権四郎	4	Nakamura	(Empire of Japan) Ichikawa, Chiba	1905	1907	—N/a	Wakashima ¤
22	Tachiyama Mineemon	太刀山 峰右衛門	11	Tomozuna	(Empire of Japan) Toyama	1911	1918	Shiranui	Azumazeki ¤
23	Ōkido Moriemon	大木戸 森右衛門	10	Minato	(Empire of Japan) Kobe, Hyōgo	1912	1914	—N/a	Minato
24	Ōtori Tanigorō	鳳 谷五郎	2	Miyagino	(Empire of Japan) Inzai, Chiba	1915	1920	Unryū	Miyagino
25	Nishinoumi Kajirō II	西ノ海 嘉治郎 (二代)	1	Izutsu	(Empire of Japan) Nishinoomote, Kagoshima	1916	1918	Unryū	Izutsu
26	Ōnishiki Uichirō	大錦 卯一郎	5	Dewanoumi	(Empire of Japan) Osaka	1917	1923	Unryū	None
27	Tochigiyama Moriya	栃木山 守也	9	Dewanoumi	(Empire of Japan) Tochigi	1918	1925	Unryū	Kasugano
28	Ōnishiki Daigorō	大錦 大五郎	6	Asahiyama	(Empire of Japan) Yatomi, Aichi	1918	1922	Unryū	None
29	Miyagiyama Fukumatsu	宮城山 福松	6	Takadagawa	(Empire of Japan) Ichinoseki, Iwate	1922	1931	Unryū	Shibatayama
30	Nishinoumi Kajirō III	西ノ海 嘉治郎 (三代)	1	Izutsu	(Empire of Japan) Kirishima, Kagoshima	1923	1928	Unryū	Asakayama
31	Tsunenohana Kan'ichi	常ノ花 寛市	10	Dewanoumi	(Empire of Japan) Okayama	1924	1930	Unryū	Dewanoumi
32	Tamanishiki San'emon	玉錦 三右衛門	9	Nishonoseki	(Empire of Japan) Kōchi	1932	1938 †	Unryū	None
33	Musashiyama Takeshi	武蔵山 武	1	Dewanoumi	(Empire of Japan) Yokohama, Kanagawa	1935	1939	Unryū	Dekiyama ¤
34	Minanogawa Tōzō	男女ノ川 登三	2	Sadogatake	(Empire of Japan) Tsukuba, Ibaraki	1936	1942	Unryū	Minanogawa ¤
35	Futabayama Sadaji	双葉山 定次	12	Tatsunami	(Empire of Japan) Usa, Ōita	1937	1945	Unryū	Tokitsukaze
36	Haguroyama Masaji	羽黒山 政司	7	Tatsunami	(Empire of Japan) Niigata	1941	1953	Shiranui	Tatsunami
37	Akinoumi Setsuo	安藝ノ海 節男	1	Dewanoumi	(Empire of Japan) Hiroshima	1942	1946	Unryū	Fujishima ¤
38	Terukuni Manzō	照國 万蔵	2	Isegahama	(Empire of Japan) Yuzawa, Akita	1942	1953	Unryū	Isegahama
39	Maedayama Eigorō	前田山 英五郎	1	Takasago	(Japan) Yawatahama, Ehime	1947	1949	Unryū	Takasago
40	Azumafuji Kin'ichi	東富士 欽壱	6	Takasago	(Japan) Taitō, Tokyo	1948	1954	Unryū	Nishikido ¤
41	Chiyonoyama Masanobu	千代の山 雅信	6	Dewanoumi	(Japan) Fukushima, Hokkaido	1951	1959	Unryū	Kokonoe
42	Kagamisato Kiyoji	鏡里 喜代治	4	Tokitsukaze	(Japan) Sannohe, Aomori	1953	1958	Unryū	Tatsutagawa
43	Yoshibayama Junnosuke	吉葉山 潤之輔	1	Takashima	(Japan) Ishikari, Hokkaido	1954	1958	Shiranui	Miyagino
44	Tochinishiki Kiyotaka	栃錦 清隆	10	Kasugano	(Japan) Edogawa, Tokyo	1954	1960	Unryū	Kasugano
45	Wakanohana Kanji I	若乃花 幹士 (初代)	10	Hanakago	(Japan) Hirosaki, Aomori	1958	1962	Unryū	Futagoyama
46	Asashio Tarō III	朝潮 太郎 (三代)	5	Takasago	(Japan) Tokunoshima, Kagoshima	1959	1962	Unryū	Takasago
47	Kashiwado Tsuyoshi	柏戸 剛	5	Isenoumi	(Japan) Tsuruoka, Yamagata	1961	1969	Unryū	Kagamiyama
48	Taihō Kōki	大鵬 幸喜	32	Nishonoseki	(Japan) Teshikaga, Hokkaido	1961	1971	Unryū	Taihō
49	Tochinoumi Teruyoshi	栃ノ海 晃嘉	3	Kasugano	(Japan) Inakadate, Aomori	1964	1966	Unryū	Kasugano
50	Sadanoyama Shinmatsu	佐田の山 晋松	6	Dewanoumi	(Japan) Shin-Kamigotō, Nagasaki	1965	1968	Unryū	Nakadachi
51	Tamanoumi Masahiro	玉の海 正洋	6	Kataonami	(Japan) Gamagōri, Aichi	1970	1971 †	Shiranui	None
52	Kitanofuji Katsuaki	北の富士 勝昭	10	Kokonoe	(Japan) Asahikawa, Hokkaido	1970	1974	Unryū	Jinmaku
53	Kotozakura Masakatsu I	琴櫻 傑将 (初代)	5	Sadogatake	(Japan) Kurayoshi, Tottori	1973	1974	Shiranui	Sadogatake
54	Wajima Hiroshi	輪島 大士	14	Hanakago	(Japan) Nanao, Ishikawa	1973	1981	Unryū	Hanakago ¤
55	Kitanoumi Toshimitsu	北の湖 敏満	24	Mihogaseki	(Japan) Sōbetsu, Hokkaido	1974	1985	Unryū	Kitanoumi
56	Wakanohana Kanji II	若乃花 幹士 (二代)	4	Futagoyama	(Japan) Ōwani, Aomori	1978	1983	Unryū	Magaki
57	Mienoumi Tsuyoshi	三重ノ海 剛司	3	Dewanoumi	(Japan) Matsusaka, Mie	1979	1980	Unryū	Musashigawa
58	Chiyonofuji Mitsugu	千代の富士 貢	31	Kokonoe	(Japan) Fukushima, Hokkaido	1981	1991	Unryū	Kokonoe
59	Takanosato Toshihide	隆の里 俊英	4	Futagoyama	(Japan) Aomori	1983	1986	Shiranui	Naruto
60	Futahaguro Kōji	双羽黒 光司	0	Tatsunami	(Japan) Tsu, Mie	1986	1988	Shiranui	None
61	Hokutoumi Nobuyoshi	北勝海 信芳	8	Kokonoe	(Japan) Hiroo, Hokkaido	1987	1992	Unryū	Hakkaku
62	Ōnokuni Yasushi	大乃国 康	2	Hanaregoma	(Japan) Memuro, Hokkaido	1987	1991	Unryū	Shibatayama
63	Asahifuji Seiya	旭富士 正也	4	Ōshima	(Japan) Tsugaru, Aomori	1990	1992	Shiranui	Isegahama
64	Akebono Tarō	曙 太郎	11	Azumazeki	Oʻahu, Hawaii, United States	1993	2001	Unryū	Akebono ¤
65	Takanohana Kōji	貴乃花 光司	22	Futagoyama	(Japan) Nakano, Tokyo	1994	2003	Unryū	Takanohana ¤
66	Wakanohana Masaru	若乃花 勝	5	Futagoyama	(Japan) Nakano, Tokyo	1998	2000	Shiranui	Fujishima ¤
67	Musashimaru Kōyō	武蔵丸 光洋	12	Musashigawa	Oʻahu, Hawaii, United States	1999	2003	Unryū	Musashigawa
68	Asashōryū Akinori	朝青龍 明徳	25	Takasago	Ulaanbaatar, Mongolia	2003	2010	Unryū	None
69	Hakuhō Shō	白鵬 翔	45	Miyagino	Ulaanbaatar, Mongolia	2007	2021	Shiranui	Miyagino ¤
70	Harumafuji Kōhei	日馬富士 公平	9	Isegahama	Govi-Altai, Mongolia	2012	2017	Shiranui	None
71	Kakuryū Rikisaburō	鶴竜 力三郎	6	Izutsu	Sükhbaatar, Mongolia	2014	2021	Unryū	Otowayama
72	Kisenosato Yutaka	稀勢の里 寛	2	Tagonoura	(Japan) Ushiku, Ibaraki	2017	2019	Unryū	Nishonoseki
73	Terunofuji Haruo	照ノ富士 春雄	10	Isegahama	Ulaanbaatar, Mongolia	2021	2025	Shiranui	Isegahama
74	Hōshōryū Tomokatsu	豊昇龍 智勝	2	Tatsunami	Ulaanbaatar, Mongolia	2025	active	Unryū	—N/a
75	Ōnosato Daiki	大の里 泰輝	7	Nishonoseki	(Japan) Tsubata, Ishikawa	2025	active	Unryū	—N/a

== See also ==
- Glossary of sumo terms
- List of active sumo wrestlers
- List of past sumo wrestlers
- List of sumo top division champions
- List of sumo top division runners-up
- List of ōzeki
- List of sekiwake
- List of komusubi
- Makuuchi
