= Yokozuna Deliberation Council =

Advisory body of Japanese professional sumo

The Yokozuna Deliberation Council (横綱審議委員会, Yokozuna shingī iinkai), sometimes called Yokozuna Promotion Council, and usually abbreviated in Japanese as Yokoshin (よこしん), is an advisory body to the Japan Sumo Association. The council considers candidates for promotion to sumo's top rank of yokozuna, before passing its recommendations to the Sumo Association. It also gives comments about san'yaku ranked wrestlers anticipating their potential promotions.

== Creation ==
The reason the council was created is because of a scandal at the beginning of 1950. All of the three yokozuna of the time (Azumafuji, Terukuni and Haguroyama) were absent for most of the January tournament, driving intense criticism. The Sumo Association even began to think about a demotion system applied to yokozuna but the idea was later dropped under pressure from sumo purists and traditionalists. To maintain the dignity of the rank, it was instead decided that yokozuna should be recommended by experts with a deep knowledge of sumo, like the House of Yoshida Tsukasa (who controlled the world of sumo during the Edo period). The Yokozuna Deliberation Council was established on April 21, 1950 as an advisory body to the Japan Sumo Association. The council was officially established by the Ministry of Education, Science, Sports and Culture.

The first chairman of the council was Tadamasa Sakai, a former count and member of the House of Peers. Its ten members were all distinguished members in fields unrelated to sumo; they include college administrators, business directors, sociologists, writers and newspaper editors. In January 1951 the Sumo Association declared that the yokozuna licenses would be, from that moment on, entirely under the control of the Yokozuna Deliberation Council and the directors of the Sumo Association, transforming the traditional recommendation and approval of the House of Yoshida Tsukasa into a pure ceremony.

== Composition and operation ==
The Yokozuna Deliberation Council is constituted on the basis of Article 52 of the Japan Sumo Association statutes. A purely advisory body, the council is a pro forma organ within professional sumo.

The council is composed of prominent Japanese citizens from various fields who are said to share a passion for sumo and have a deep understanding of it. Since it is made up of personalities not employed by the Japan Sumo Association, the council is supposed to represent public opinion on wrestlers promoted to the supreme rank of yokozuna.

During the emergence of foreign wrestlers in Japan's national sport, the media platform offered to council members revealed differences of opinion within it. Some council members publicly sided with opening the supreme rank of yokozuna to foreigners, citing in particular that it "makes no difference if the open door would create a desirable stimulus" for the sport, notably to motivate Japanese wrestlers then perceived as "lazy and slack". Others took a public stand in favor of excluding wrestlers from the rank, deigning that they did not, by definition, possess the dignity necessary to practice at the highest level of the banzuke.

Sumo Association members cannot be appointed in the council and its members are unpaid. Since 1997, it was decided that members would serve terms of two years, with a maximum of five terms. The number of members is limited to 15 and there are currently 9 members on the council. The council is directed by a chairman elected by mutual vote of members. The chairman's term of office is 2 years, up to 2 terms. Sumo Association members can also attend and take part at the meeting; the Sumo Association's chairman and other directors usually attend the meeting.

The meeting of the council is held after the announcement of each tournament ranking and before the final ranking organization meeting. It is also held the day after each tournament's senshūraku. At the request of the Sumo Association, the council will report to the association's consultation on yokozuna recommendation based on the wrestler's hinkaku (品格, dignity) and other yokozuna-related matters, or make recommendations based on its suggestions. Should a wrestler emerge as a contender for the highest rank in professional sumo, the Sumo Association will formally request the opinion of the council, which will vote to approve or disapprove the wrestler in question. Although the Sumo Association is free to ignore the advice of the council, it is customary to follow its recommendation. Moreover, it is rare for the council to oppose the choice of wrestler presented by the association, as debates on the wrestler's qualities are generally internal.

The council also usually provides three types of advice to the already existing yokozuna it examines:

- Encouragement (激励, gekirei)
- Warning (注意, chūi)
- Recommendation to Retire (引退勧告, intai kankoku)

For the yokozuna promotion process, the internal rule is that an ōzeki wins two tournaments in a row in principle. This rule was established following the promotion of the yokozuna Futahaguro in 1986. The Sumo Association was looking for an opponent to Chiyonofuji who was a dominant yokozuna. Futahaguro's performance suggested that he would win tournaments quickly, and the Sumo Association decided to promote him to yokozuna before he had actually won any Emperor's Cup. However, Futahaguro's results never matched his rank and his attitude problems led to his forced retirement in 1988.

From that day on the Association decided to organise a more efficient filtering of wrestlers eligible for the rank of yokozuna by unofficially requiring two tournaments won in a row. Since Asahifuji in 1990, every yokozuna promoted until Kakuryū won two tournaments in a row. Today, the Sumo Association seems to consider that results "equivalent to a tournament victory" can also be considered sufficient for promotion to the sumo supreme title. When recommending a wrestler with similar results, two-thirds or more of the attending council members must agree. The council also report on the second highest rank of sumo because ōzeki are at the gateway of the yokozuna rank. Therefore, in 2022, the Yokozuna Deliberation council delivered harsh comments on the attitude and performances of the three ōzeki at that time (Takakeishō, Shōdai and Mitakeumi), even going as far as proposing a harsher system in case of an ōzeki demotion. In the meantime, the council also gives praises to promising talents. For example, during the same period, the council praised sekiwake Wakatakakage and maegashira Tamawashi on their tournament.

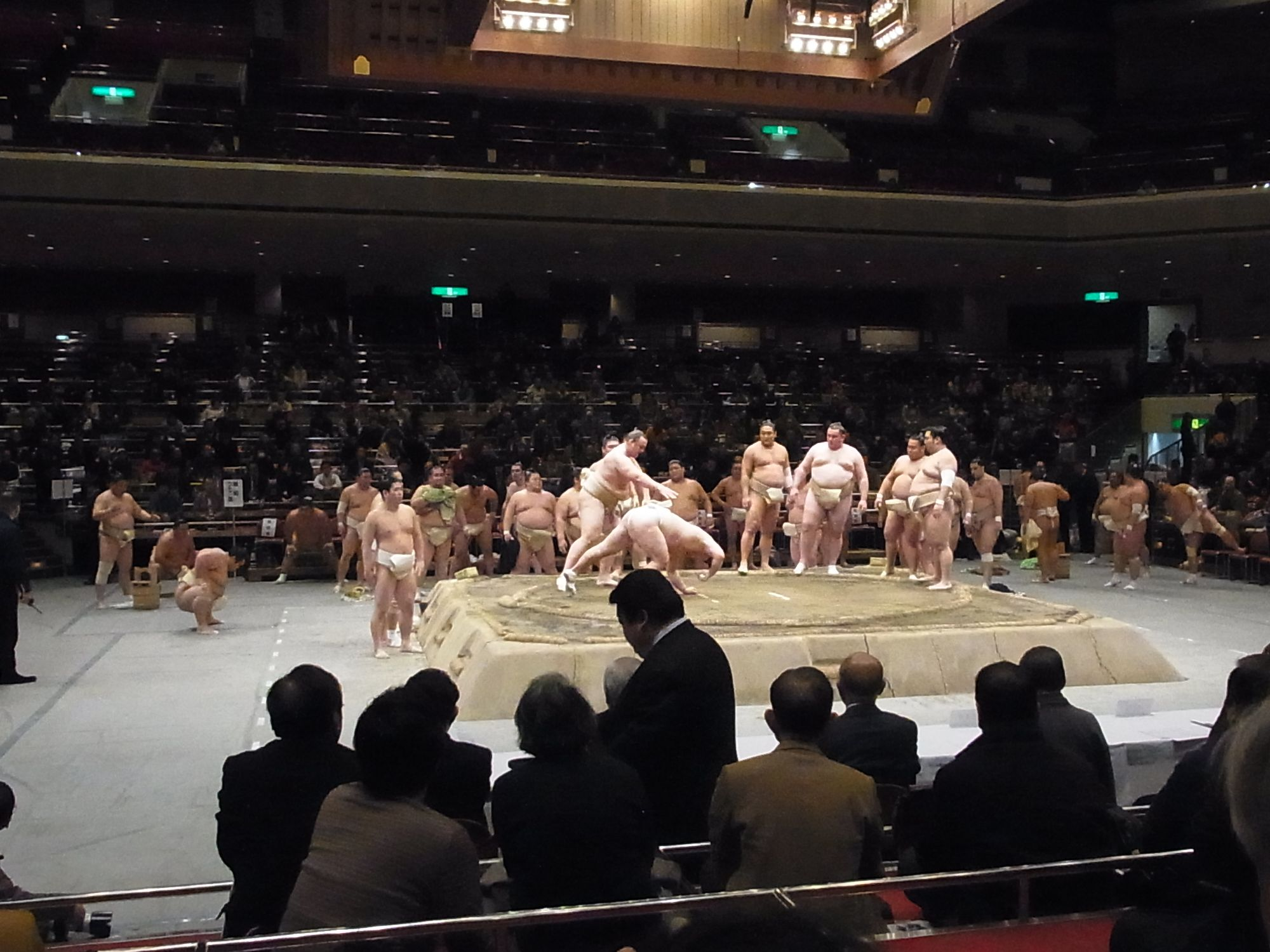
The December 2011 sōken practice.

Finally, the council also hold an open keiko session (called sōken, 総見) at the Ryōgoku Kokugikan, in front of a considerable number of toshiyori, as well as many members of the sports and mainstream media. The event is also filmed by at least six different entities. The sōken was opened to the general public and held in the main area of the Kokugikan, but in 2023 the Japan Sumo Association and the yokoshin decided to move the training to the sumo school rings with a limited attendance.

In September 2023, it was decided that the sōken would once again be open to the public. This event, the first public one in four years, also marked the first time that a Yokozuna Deliberation Council event coincided with a kanreki dohyō-iri, the chairman of the Japan Sumo Association, Hakkaku (the former Hokutoumi), having celebrated his sixtieth birthday on the same date.

In 2000, the Ministry of Education, Culture, Sports, Science and Technology appointed Makiko Uchidate as a member of the council. It was the first time a woman was made a member of the yokoshin. In 2022, the Ministry appointed Konno Misako and Ikenobō Yasuko as members of the Yokozuna Deliberation Council and, for the first time, two women became members at the same time of an organization linked to the Japanese Sumo Association.

=== Notices ===
Notices have been issued three times since the council's inception in 1950:

- January 2010: Recommendation to Retire issued to Asashōryū.
  The recommendation was issued following allegations that Asashōryū punched and injured an acquaintance in a drunken brawl at a nightclub during the January 2010 tournament. It has been suggested in the media that Asashōryū chose to retire before the Sumo Association could follow through on the council's recommendation.
- November 2018: Encouragement issued to Kisenosato.
  The council issued its first Encouragement notice of its history because Kisenosato lost his first five matches in the November 2018 tournament before withdrawing. Prior to that, he had withdrawn (either partially or fully) without a winning record in eight out of ten tournaments as yokozuna. The withdrawals were due in part to injuries suffered at the end of his winning tournament run in March 2017. He eventually retired from the sport after three consecutive defeats in the January 2019 basho.
- November 2020: Warning issued to two yokozuna, Hakuhō and Kakuryū.
  According to the council, both wrestlers did not perform to the level required of the yokozuna rank between November 2019 and November 2020. In that timeframe, Hakuhō sufficiently performed three times (yūshō in November 2019 and March 2020, plus a 10-win performance in July 2020) while Kakuryū sufficiently performed just once (runner-up in March 2020 with 12 wins). Both of them sat out of the September 2020 and November 2020 tournaments due to injury.
  The warning to Hakuhō and Kakuryū was upheld in March 2021. Kakuryū sat out for two additional tournaments since the warning was first issued, eventually retiring during the March 2021 basho. After sitting out of the January 2021 tournament due to COVID-19, Hakuhō won two matches in March before withdrawing when doctors told him that he would require kneecap surgery.

== Current members ==
As of January 2025.

Name	Appointed since	Notes
Tadamori Ōshima	January 2023	Chairman of the Yokozuna Deliberation Council. Former member of the House of Representatives (Liberal Democratic Party).
Uichirō Ōshima	January 2020	President of the Chunichi Shimbun.
Yasuko Ikenobō	March 2022	Former Minister of Education, Culture, Sports, Science and Technology; Former member of the House of Representatives (Komeito Party).
Misako Konno	March 2022	Actress.
Shigeru Uehara	January 2023	Taisho Pharmaceutical president.
Shigeru Kashima	February 2024	French literature scholar and literary critic at Meiji University.
Kazumi Murose	January 2025	Professional lacquerer. Living National Treasure for his maki-e work.
Yasushi Manago	January 2025	Former Vice-Minister of Finance.
Masahiko Ichiriki	January 2025	Representative director of Kahoku Shimpo Publishing Co.. External director at Tohoku Broadcasting Company.

== List of past chairmen ==
Name	Tenure	Note
Tadamasa Sakai †	1950-1969	Member of the first council after its foundation. Elected chairman until his death in 1969.
Seiichi Funahashi †	1969-1976	Writer and novelist.
Mitsujirō Ishii †	1976-1981	Former deputy prime minister. Former president of the Japan Sports Association.
Takahashi Yoshitaka †	1981-1990	Scholar of German literature, critic and essayist.
Hideo Ueda †	1990-1993	Former Professor at the Faculty of Medicine, University of Tokyo. Resigned from the chairmanship due to health problem in 1993.
Seiki Watanabe †	1993-1997	Former Asahi Shimbun president.
Tomokazu Sakamoto †	1997-1999	Former NHK chairman.
Kazuo Ichiriki †	1999-2001	Former Kahoku Shimpō chairman.
Tsuneo Watanabe †	2001-2003	Former Yomiuri Shimbun chairman.
Yoshio Ishibashi †	2003-2007	Former Kyoritsu Women's University president.
Katsuji Ebisawa	2007-2009	Journalist, Former NHK president. Former chairman of Japan Sumo Association's Counselor committee.
Takuhiko Tsuruta †	2009-2013	Former Nikkei, Inc. chairman. Actively participated to Sumo reforms under Hiroyoshi Murayama term and before the Association became a Public Interest Incorporated Foundation.
Hitoshi Uchiyama †	2013-2015	Former Yomiuri Shimbun counselor.
Hideshige Moriya	2015-2017	Professor Emeritus at Chiba University.
Masatō Kitamura	2017-2019	Advisor to the Mainichi Shimbun's board and former Japan Newspaper Publishers and Editors Association president.
Hironori Yano	2019-2022	Central Nippon Expressway Company advisor.
Masahiko Kōmura	2022-2023	Former Minister of Defense and Foreign Affairs.
Masayuki Yamauchi	2023-2025	Professor Emeritus at the University of Tokyo.
