= Tachiyama Mineemon =

Japanese sumo wrestler

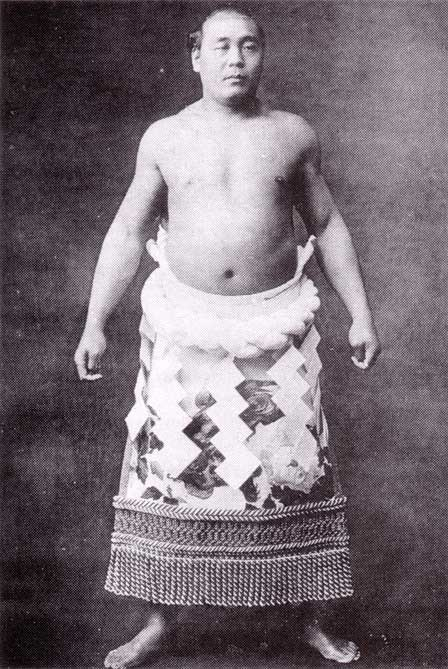
- Tachiyama, circa 1916

Personal information
- Native name: 太刀山 峯右衞門
- Born: Oimoto Yajirō; August 15, 1877 Toyama, Japan
- Died: April 3, 1941 (aged 63)
- Height: 1.88 m (6 ft 2 in)
- Weight: 150 kg (331 lb)

Sport
- Sport: Sumo
- Retired: January, 1918
- Heya: Tomozuna
- Record: 211-30-73(11 draws)
- Debut: May, 1900
- Highest rank: Yokozuna (February, 1911)
- Elder name: Azumazeki
- Championships: 9 (Makuuchi, official); 2 (Makuuchi, unofficial)
- Updated on June 25, 2020

Tachiyama Mineemon (Japanese: 太刀山 峯右衞門; August 15, 1877 – April 3, 1941) was a Japanese professional sumo wrestler from Toyama City, Toyama Prefecture. He was the sport's 22nd yokozuna. He was well known for his extreme strength and skill. He won 99 out of 100 matches from 1909 to 1916 (not counting draws), and also won eleven top division tournament championships (two of them unofficial as they were before the championship system was established in 1909).

== Career ==
His real name was Oimoto Yajirō (老本 弥次郎). Tachiyama joined Tomozuna stable at the insistence of Itagaki Taisuke and Saigō Tsugumichi. There, he became stablemate with Kunimiyama, who later became an ōzeki. However he was so strong that most of the wrestlers in the stable were unable to practice with him. Therefore, Hitachiyama Taniemon became his practical coach. He was promoted to yokozuna in February 1911.

His most feared skill was tsuki, or pushing. On the 3rd day of June 1910 tournament, Tachiyama's thrusts caused komusubi Kohitachi Yoshitaro to fly over spectators where he fell in the fourth row of seats. Kohitachi was wounded and left the tournament. Tachiyama is reported to have waved a shell weighing 400 kg (880 lb) with one arm. He was, however, good on the mawashi as well.

Much taller and stronger than his contemporaries, Tachiyama never had a losing record (make-koshi) in his eighteen-year career, and whilst at the yokozuna rank lost only three bouts. He once won 43 bouts in a row, lost one to Nishinoumi Kajirō II, then won another 56 in a row. If he had not lost that match (which he claimed many years later was deliberate, to help out his rival yokozuna who was struggling at the time), he would have set an all-time record of 100 consecutive wins. As it stands, his second winning streak of 56 bouts, which began on the 9th day of the January 1912 tournament, is the fifth best in history after Futabayama, Tanikaze, Hakuho and Umegatani I.

His run ended on the 8th day of May 1916 tournament, when he was finally defeated by Tochigiyama Moriya. This tournament saw his final championship win, and he still holds the record for the oldest ever yūshō winner as of 2022. On the final day of January 1917 tournament, he was defeated by Ōnishiki Uichirō. Tochigiyama and Ōnishiki were pupils of Hitachiyama. After this second loss, he retired.

In 1917, he said to wrestlers, "I will give you one bale of rice if you can walk around the dohyō shouldering me." A boy, who had not made his debut in professional sumo yet, acceded to his request. He failed at the first attempt but succeeded at the second. About 15 years later, that boy became yokozuna Tamanishiki San'emon.

His style of yokozuna dohyō-iri (ring-entering ceremony) came to be known as Shiranui after it was imitated by later yokozuna Haguroyama. However, he insisted that his style was Unryū Kyūkichi's.

His sheer strength and physical presence drew comparisons with Raiden Tameemon, but also meant he was perhaps less popular with the general public than his predecessors Hitachiyama and Umegatani II.

After retiring from active competition he was briefly an elder of the Sumo Association under the name Azumazeki, but left the sumo world in May 1919. In 1937 he became the first yokozuna to perform a kanreki dohyō-iri, or '60th year ring entrance ceremony' to commemorate his years as yokozuna.

== Top Division Record ==
Tachiyama
-	Spring	Summer
1903	East Maegashira #9; 6–3–1	East Maegashira #2; 4–4–1; 1d
1904	East Maegashira #2; 7–2–1	East Maegashira #1; 8–1–1; Unofficial
1905	East Maegashira #1; 7–1–1; 1h	East Sekiwake; 5–2–2; 1d
1906	East Sekiwake; 7–2–1	East Sekiwake; 4–1–5
1907	East Sekiwake; 5–1–3; 1d	East Sekiwake; 8–1–1; Unofficial
1908	East Sekiwake; 6–2–1; 1h	East Sekiwake; 7–1–1; 1d
1909	West Sekiwake; 6–1–2; 1d	West Ōzeki; 8–2
1910	West Ōzeki; 6–0–1; 2d 1h	West Ōzeki; 9–0; 1d
1911	West Ōzeki; 8–0; 1d 1h	West Yokozuna; 10–0
1912	East Yokozuna; 8–1; 1d	West Yokozuna; 10–0
1913	Sat out	East Yokozuna; 10–0
1914	East Yokozuna; 10–0	West Yokozuna; 8–0–1; 1h
1915	Sat out	West Yokozuna; 10–0
1916	Sat out	West Yokozuna; 9–1
1917	East Yokozuna; 9–1	Sat out
1918	West Yokozuna; Retired –	x
Record given as win-loss-absent Top Division Champion Top Division Runner-up Retired Lower Divisions Key:d=Draw(s) (引分); h=Hold(s) (預り); Divisions: Makuuchi — Jūryō — Makushita — Sandanme — Jonidan — Jonokuchi Makuuchi ranks: Yokozuna — Ōzeki — Sekiwake — Komusubi — Maegashira

*Championships for the best record in a tournament were not recognized or awarded before the 1909 summer tournament and the above championships that are labelled "unofficial" are historically conferred. For more information see yūshō.

== See also ==
- Glossary of sumo terms
- Kanreki dohyo-iri
- List of past sumo wrestlers
- List of sumo tournament top division champions
- List of yokozuna

Preceded by Wakashima Gonshirō	22nd Yokozuna; 1911–1918	Succeeded by Ōkido Moriemon
Yokozuna is not a successive rank, and more than one wrestler can hold the title at once
