= House of Yoshida Tsukasa =

Japanese clan once responsible for the organization of professional sumo in Japan

House of Yoshida Tsukasa 吉田司家 Yoshida tsukasa-ke
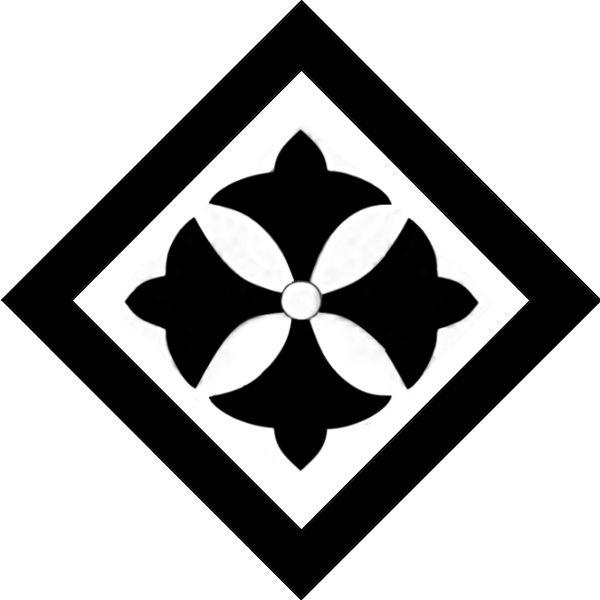
- kamon of the House of Yoshida Tsukasa
- Home province: Bungo later Kumamoto Prefecture
- Titles: Bungonokami; Oikaze
- Founder: Yoshida Ietsugu
- Final ruler: Yoshida Nagayoshi
- Current head: Yoshida Nagataka
- Founding year: 1186
- Dissolution: still extant
- Ruled until: 1951 (emergence of the Yokozuna Deliberation Council)

The House of Yoshida Tsukasa (吉田司家), also commonly called Yoshida family, is a Japanese aristocratic family who was once responsible for the organization of professional sumo in feudal Japan, controlling rikishi (professional wrestlers) and gyōji (sumo referees) throughout the country, making sure that sumo etiquette was strictly observed, and granting the rank of yokozuna and tate-gyōji through a license system.

Although still in existence today, the Yoshida family saw its authority over the sumo world diminish significantly during the Meiji restoration, and was only figurative by the early 1950s, until it ceased to be a nominating body when the Yokozuna Deliberation Council was created.

== History ==
=== Origin ===
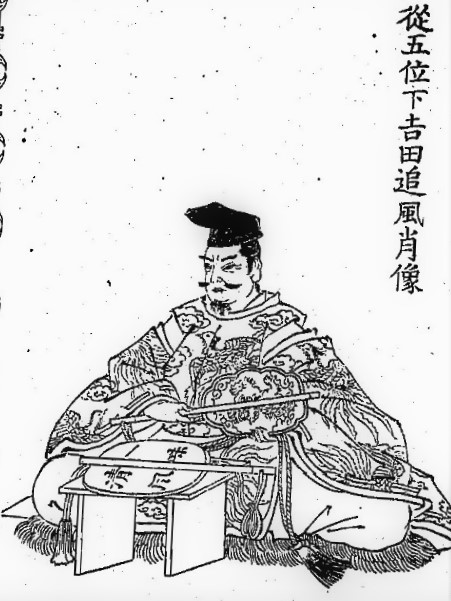
Yoshida Ietsugu, semi-mythical founder and first "Oikaze" of the House of Yoshida Tsukasa

At the beginning of the reign of shogun Tokugawa Ienari, the Edo-sumo organization elders undertook to make sumo charity events more respectable. In 1789, in response to edicts requiring official documents for the practice of certain activities and offices, Yoshida Oikaze (also known as Yoshida Zenzaemon), who had become a very influential man in Edo-sumo under the patronage of the Hosokawa clan of the Kumamoto Domain, submitted to the official of Edo shrines a number of documents authenticating both his own authority over the sumo world and the supposed historicity of some of the sumo traditions.

According to these documents, later grouped together in the Yoshida-ke senzo-sho (吉田家先祖書), the "Yoshida Family Ancestors Book", Oikaze claimed, through a family tree he produced, to descent from a warrior named Yoshida Ietsugu, from the province of Echizen. The Echizen Province was home to the very first family of referee: the line of Shiga no Seirin (sometimes spelled Shigano Seirin or called Shiga Seirin), a powerful wrestler appointed by Emperor Shōmu as official referee of the Heian court in the early 8th century. Shiga no Seirin is generally acknowledged as the first man who established the original forty-eight sumo techniques and as the founder of the gyōji profession. When the lineage of Shiga no Seirin ended for lack of descendants at the end of the 12th century, Ietsugu would have been chosen by Emperor Go-Toba to officiate as referee for the court banquet-tournaments. His name was changed to Oikaze (追風), and he was given a war fan to lead the matches. In addition, he was also appointed Bungonokami (豊後守), an honorary title given by the imperial court of Kyoto that does not reflect real power like that of the governor of Bungo Province, appointed by the shogunate. The name of Yoshida Oikaze appears as a referee in the oldest known banzuke, in 1699 in Kyoto.

During the Edo period it was traditional for provincial lords and military leaders to have in their retinue martial artists and to appoint officials to train them. The majority of the mentors in that period came from another noble family, the Gojō family from Kyoto. This family was a branch of the Sugawara clan and was founded at the end of the Kamakura period. It claimed descent from the legendary Nomi no Sukune, and emerged during the latter part of the Muromachi period. As noble patrons of the sumo world, the Gojō became a symbol of authority, and those who wanted to become sumo officials sought their support in order to gain their recognition. Among these aspirants was the founder of the House of Yoshida Tsukasa.

=== Growing power in the Edo era ===
During the Edo period, under the reign of Shogun Tsuneyoshi, the warlord attended a sumo match led by the then-current Yoshida Oikaze on a visit to the province of Higo in Kyushu. The shogun was so impressed by his performance that he authorised one of his own vassals to become a disciple of the Yoshida family, and declared that from then on referees and wrestlers would only be licensed by the Yoshida family. After Tsunayoshi's death, however, the Gojō family of Kyoto also obtained permission to grant licences through a ruling by Judge Shikimori Gōdaiyu. In 1789, Yoshida Oikaze saw the Gojō license as a threat to his absolute control of the sumo world. Along with his family family tree he produced in 1789, Yoshida Oikaze added a request to the Edo authorities for official recognition of his own power to issue what he called, for the first time, the yokozuna licence. Oikaze's claim was accepted, and he was recognised by the Edo authorities as the official for court sumo events. Just before the tournament in the eleventh month of that year, he issued yokozuna licences to the champions Tanikaze and Onogawa. Ten days later Tanikaze performed the first yokozuna ring-entering ceremony in the grounds of the Fukagawa Hachiman shrine. The power of the Yoshida family was officially established, but the Gojō family continued to be known as an influential family for well over a century, extending its influence into Edo's rival major cities, such as Osaka and his native Kyoto. It soon became customary for licences to be issued jointly by the two families if a wrestler who did not belong to the Edo-sumo association attained a status that allowed him to be promoted to yokozuna.

The work of the House of Yoshida Tsukasa culminated in the match between Tanikaze and Onogawa on June 11, 1791, in the Fukiage gardens in Edo citadel. This tournament marked a milestone in professional sumo as Tokugawa Ienari (the 11th Tokugawa shogun) attended the matches in person. The desire of Ienari and his predecessors to organize sumo had gradually shifted tournaments from the authority of the imperial court to that of the shogun. Encouraged by the Hosokawa clan, who wished to gain influence through their vassal Oikaze, the shogun agreed to hold a tournament in his presence for the first time, in the imperial palace. To be worthy of the honour of the occasion, the Edo-sumo elders, led by the 19th Yoshida Oikaze, established a set of rules which form the basis of the sumo rituals still practised today, consolidating the authority of the Yoshida Tsukasa family by including notions of respectability and high spiritual values into sumo. At the time, the matches were often associated with carnival like atmosphere. Sumo began to take on elements of the Shinto tradition and referees, as fight controllers, took on the role of substitute priests, further developing the importance of the licences to appoint referees and wrestlers held by the Gojō and Yoshida Tsukasa families.

The Gojō family and the House of Yoshida Tsukasa had a long rivalry over the granting of the yokozuna licence. Although the House of Yoshida Tsukasa licensed the vast majority of wrestlers of its own accord, it did have to license a number of wrestlers after they had already been recognised as yokozuna by the Gojō family, like Sakaigawa or Wakashima. Finally, the influence of the House of Yoshida Tsukasa was so great that the heads of this family could also afford not to license wrestlers from families descending from the Tokugawa line, with the exception of Inazuma, although this was in reaction to the licence offered to him by the Gojō family. This is one of the hypothesis put forward to explain the failure to promote Raiden to the rank of yokozuna. Without exception, all the yokozuna promoted by the Yoshida family after Inazuma come from non-Tokugawa domains.

=== Diminishing power ===
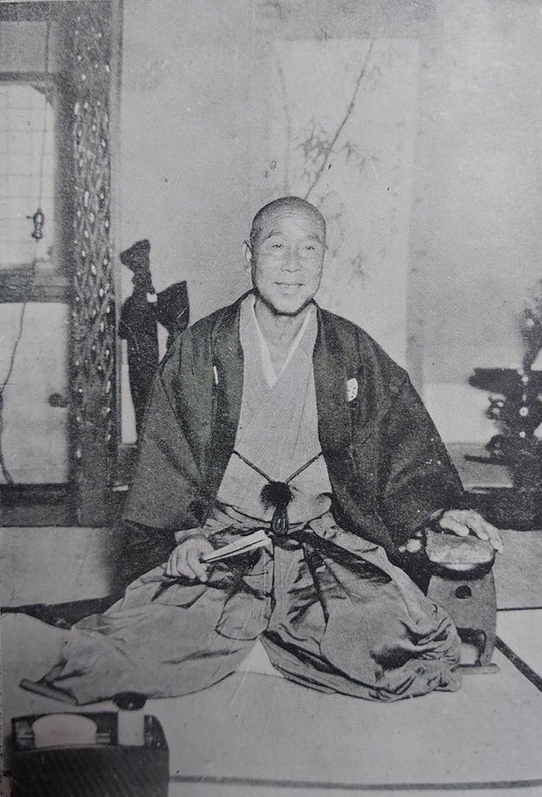
The 23rd Yoshida Oikaze.

During the Boshin War, the civil war forced the cancellation of the sumo tournaments. The head of the Yoshida family (the 23rd Yoshida Oikaze, appointed in 1871) surrendered after fighting for his Hosokawa masters against Saigō Takamori's forces, and the Yoshida family was unable to grant a yokozuna license for any wrestler. The authority of the Yoshida family fell because of these events and the detention of the head of the family.

Since the fall of the Tokugawa shogunate and the establishment of the Meiji Restoration, the Gojō family of Kyoto began to thrive, taking advantage of the decline of the powerful Yoshida patrons, the Hosokawa clan. They began to produce an incomprehensible abundance of yokozuna. In 1877, the 23rd Yoshida Oikaze served again in the Satsuma Rebellion but was defeated and captured. With its leader in prison, the House of Yoshida was unable to oppose the appointment that same year of Yokozuna Sakaigawa, nominated by the Gojō family, and had to approve this choice. Sakaigawa was promoted yokozuna during this period of turmoil, and he was the only yokozuna to be officially recognized at the end of that period of "overproduced yokozuna", also known as the "yokozuna abuse era" (横綱濫造時代). In 1884, however, Umegatani I received a double license from the Yoshida and Gojō families at his request, resulting in the Yoshida family's survival. The 23rd Oikaze of the Yoshida family continued to award official licences to yokozuna until the 35th, Futabayama, in 1937.

In 1950, the 24th Yoshida Oikaze (Yoshida Nagayoshi) retired from his duties after he squandered his clan's funds on a baseball betting scheme, which caused a scandal. After discussions between the Sumo Association and the House of Yoshida Tsukasa, it was decided that yokozuna (starting with Chiyonoyama) would be decided by the Sumo Association in consultation with the Yokozuna Deliberation Council, the head house being only present at the ceremony to award the yokozuna certificate of authenticity in a purely ceremonial role.

In 1986, the ceremony of conferring yokozuna was fully entrusted to the Japan Sumo Association. Thus, since May 1986, the Japan Sumo Association has been appointing yokozuna on its own. Ruined, the House of Yoshida Tsukasa lost its estate, which is now used as a residential building in Kumamoto.

The family still exists today, although it has been ruined by the financial scandal in which it was involved. In 2015, the House of Yoshida Tsukasa moved to Aso, Kumamoto Prefecture.

== Legacy in current sumo ==
=== Yokozuna ===
Since Chiyonoyama in 1951, when a yokozuna is up for promotion, he is first examined by the Yokozuna Deliberation Council, which assesses whether he is worthy of promotion by analyzing his performance in the ring and his conduct. The council's agreement is then relayed to the Japan Sumo Association, which relays the promotion to the interested wrestler. Before this system was integrated, it was the Yoshida family who gave de facto approval for promotions, fulfilling the same purpose as the deliberation council. At the time, when a strong wrestler (rikishi) was desired to be elevated to the rank of yokozuna by the Sumo Association, the elders would submit a request to the Yoshida family in Kumamoto for a yokozuna license, and if approved, the wrestler would travel to Kumamoto with a representative of the JSA to receive a yokozuna diploma, a certificate of historical significance, and a yokozuna title from the Yoshida family. The term "yokozuna", which originally referred to the certification of a champion to perform the entrance ceremony on the dohyō, eventually came to designate the wrestler himself. Yokozuna was not considered a rank in the banzuke until 1909.

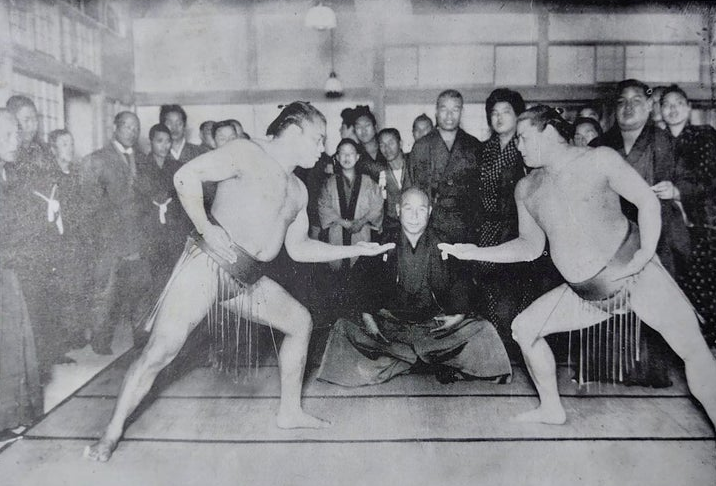
Sandangamae ceremony rehearsal between Yokozuna Tochigiyama (left) and Yokozuna Ōtori (right) under the supervision of Gyōji Yoshida Oikaze (sitting in the center).

The Yoshida family issued the yokozuna certificate to 37 yokozuna, with the exception of the first three, who were later added to the family annals. Akashi, Ayagawa and Maruyama and certain Osaka sumo-based yokozuna received their yokozuna licenses initially from the Gojō family, which caused fierce battles between the two rival families. The Gojō family-appointed yokozuna were the Inazuma, Jinmaku, Sakaigawa and Umegatani I. who received his licenses from both Osaka (Gojō) and Tokyo (Yoshida) Sumo Associations at his request. The 23rd yokozuna Ōkido was independently awarded the title by the Osaka Sumo Association which caused a deep and lasting rift between the Tokyo and Osaka associations.

The Yoshida family's influence was not limited to simply formalizing promotions, and Yoshida Oikaze also had a major influence on the ceremonial surrounding the yokozuna and their regalia. Among the documents provided by the 19th Yoshida Oikaze to attest to his clan's superiority over sumo rituals, is the origin of the emblematic port of the rope; called yokozuna (横綱), lit. 'horizontal rope'. According to Oikaze, there was a great early 9th-century wrestler by the name of Hajikami, from Ōmi Province. One day, while performing ritual sumo fights at the Sumiyoshi shrine in Settsu Province, he outclassed his opponents so much that the referee, the legendary Shiga no Seirin, seized the shimenawa in front of the shrine and wrapped it around Hajikami's waist, proclaiming that if even one wrestler was able to place his hand on the rope, he would be declared the winner. Hajikami still faced his opponents one by one, but even then none of them could get close to the rope. According to Yoshida documents it was common practice long before the 18th century for one or two of the strongest wrestlers of their era to take part in the consecration ceremonies preceding the construction of castles or large residences. During the ritual, straw ropes were spread out on the ground, and wrestlers, designated as literal yokozuna (横綱), would perform exorcism rites on top of those ropes, stamping their feet hard on the ground to drive away evil spirits. To purify his own body, the wrestler wore a shimenawa. On these occasions, wrestlers are granted a special license to testify to their initiation into the secrets required to perform the ritual.

=== Tate-gyōji ===
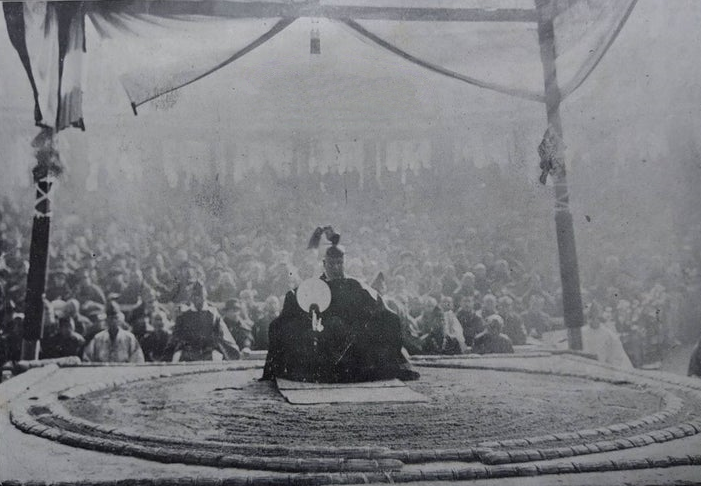
The House of Yoshida Tsukasa introduced the ring consecration ceremony tradition (here performed by the 23rd Yoshida Oikaze)

At the beginning of the 18th century, the Yoshida family dominated the world of referees without question. In 1726 the referee Kimura Shōnosuke sought official recognition from the Yoshida for his duties, followed in 1729 by Shikimori Godaiyū. Both of them then founded hereditary lines that became the references in Edo and that still exist today. A list of referees endorsed as disciples of the Yoshida family around 1770 includes Kimura and Shikimori in Edo, "Iwai Sauma" in Kyoto, "Shakushi Ichigaku" in Osaka, "Hattori Shikiemon" in Higo and "Suminoe Shikikuro" in Nagasaki. Only the Nagase family remains totally independent from the Yoshida Tsukasa, but they never had any influence outside their fiefdom of Ōshū. These families were gradually eliminated, and at the end of the Edo period, only two families, Kimura and Shikimori, remained.

=== Shimpan and dohyō ===
While preparing the tournament for Shogun Tokugawa Ienari, the 19th Yoshida Oikaze also drew up plans specifying the presence of a Shinto roof over the dohyō and how to build it. The presence of four sumo judges to referee the matches is also mentioned for the first time.
