= Chiyonoyama Masanobu =

Japanese sumo wrestler

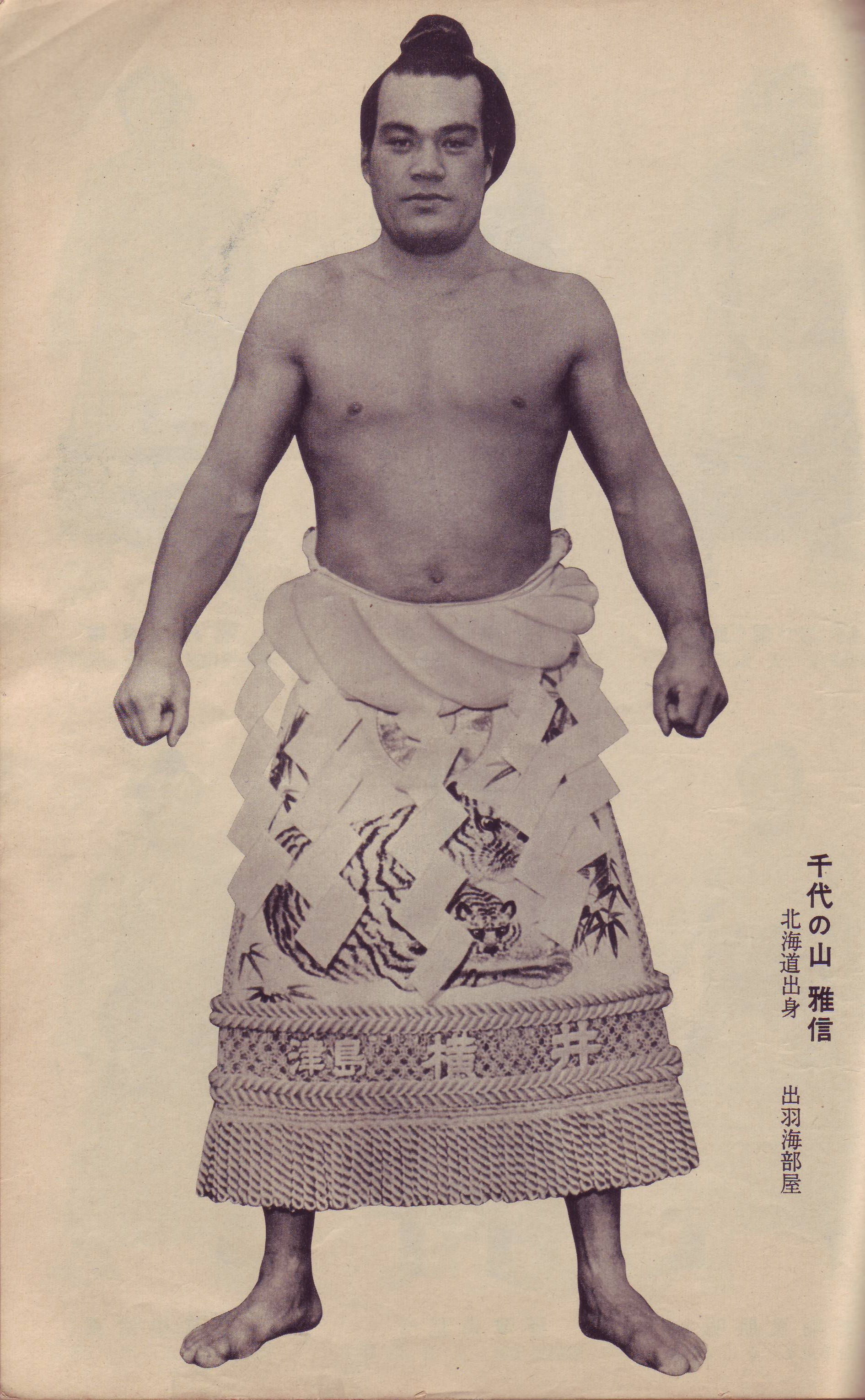

Personal information
- Native name: 千代の山 雅信
- Born: Sugimura Masaharu; June 2, 1926 Fukushima, Hokkaidō, Japan
- Died: October 29, 1977 (aged 51) Sapporo, Japan
- Height: 1.90 m (6 ft 3 in)
- Weight: 122 kg (269 lb)

Sport
- Sport: Sumo
- Retired: January 1959
- Heya: Dewanoumi
- Record: 403-158-147 (2 draws)
- Debut: January 1942
- Highest rank: Yokozuna (May 1951)
- Elder name: Kokonoe
- Championships: 6 (Makuuchi); 2 (Jūryō)
- Special Prizes: Outstanding Performance (1); Fighting Spirit (1)
- Gold Stars: 3 Haguroyama; Terukuni; Maedayama
- Updated on June 2020

Chiyonoyama Masanobu (Japanese: 千代の山 雅信; June 2, 1926 – October 29, 1977) was a Japanese professional sumo wrestler from Fukushima, Hokkaidō. He was the sport's 41st yokozuna, between 1951 until 1959. He is regarded as the first "modern" yokozuna in that he was promoted by the Japan Sumo Association itself and not the House of Yoshida Tsukasa. He was the first yokozuna from Hokkaidō, which was also the birthplace of the subsequent yokozuna Yoshibayama, Taihō, Kitanoumi and his own recruits Kitanofuji and Chiyonofuji. After his retirement he left the Dewanoumi group of stables and founded Kokonoe stable in 1967. He died in 1977 while still an active stablemaster.

== Career ==
Chiyonoyama was born Sugimura Masaharu (杉村 昌治), the fifth son of a squid fisherman. He joined Dewanoumi stable in January 1942. Chiyonoyama injured his knee in his first tournament, an injury that was to trouble him for the rest of his career. He reached the second highest jūryō division in November 1944 and made his debut in the top makuuchi division in November 1945. He had been an admirer of yokozuna Futabayama but his dream of facing him in competition ended after Futabayama announced his retirement during Chiyonoyama's makuuchi debut. In this first tournament he won all ten of his bouts but was denied the championship as in the absence of any playoff system in the event of a tie, it was simply awarded to the wrestler higher in rank (in this case, yokozuna Haguroyama).

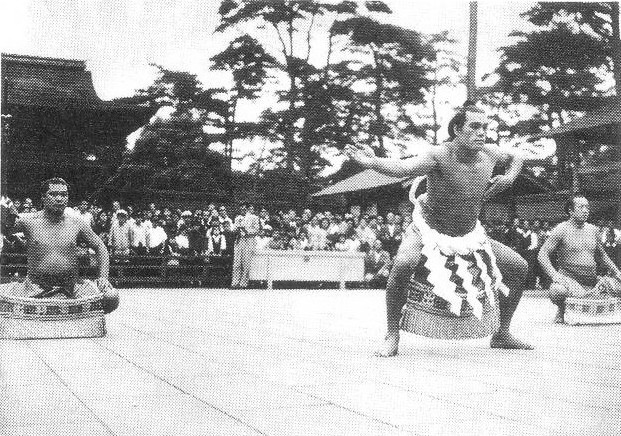
Chiyonoyama performing the yokozuna dohyo-iri at the Meiji Shrine in June 1951, shortly after his promotion.

In May 1949 Chiyonoyama defeated three yokozuna, finishing with a 12–3 record, and was promoted to ōzeki. He won two consecutive championships in October 1949 and January 1950 but was denied promotion to yokozuna as the Sumo Association felt he was rather young at twenty three and with his second championship being "only" a 12–3 they wanted to wait until they were sure he was ready. His October 1949 victory also coincided with the controversy over struggling yokozuna Maedayama being told to retire after being seen at a baseball game while he was supposed to be recuperating from illness. Chiyonoyama was eventually promoted in May 1951 after winning his third championship with a 14–1 record. He was the first yokozuna to be promoted without being awarded a licence by the house of Yoshida Tsukasa. During his yokozuna career he missed many bouts due to injury and in 1953 even asked to be demoted back to ōzeki so he could start over again. The Sumo Association refused this unprecedented request. Chiyonoyama finally took his first championship as a yokozuna in January 1955 with a playoff win over Tokitsuyama and won two more thereafter, in March 1955 and January 1957. Increasingly troubled by his knee injury to the point where he could sometimes barely walk due to the pain, he announced his retirement in January 1959.

== Retirement from sumo ==
Chiyonoyama had expected to take over as head coach of Dewanoumi stable after the death of Dewanoumi Oyakata in 1960, but he was considered too young for the responsibility at 34, and he lost a succession battle to former maegashira Dewanohana. After yokozuna Sadanoyama married Dewanohana's daughter, Chiyonoyama realised he had no chance to take over and so asked to leave and set up his own stable. This was allowed on the condition that he also leave the Dewanoumi ichimon (group of stables). Previously the Dewanoumi camp had, since the days of Hitachiyama, always prevented ex-wrestlers from branching out. In March 1967 he set up Kokonoe stable, taking ōzeki (later yokozuna) Kitanofuji and nine other recruits with him. In 1970 future yokozuna Chiyonofuji, also from Fukushima, Hokkaidō, joined the stable. Chiyonoyama was unable to see Chiyonofuji reach the yokozuna rank as he died of liver cancer aged fifty one in 1977, but his widow attended Chiyonofuji's promotion ceremony in 1981.

== Personal life ==
In September 1952 he married the daughter of an Osaka restaurant owner.

== Fighting style ==
Early in his career Chiyonoyama was known for the power of his tsuppari (thrusting) attack but during his successful run to yokozuna in 1951 he made an effort to improve his yotsu-sumo (grappling) techniques under the supervision of ex-yokozuna Tochigiyama of Kasugano stable and his own head coach, former yokozuna Tsunenohana. He liked a migi-yotsu (left hand outside, right hand inside) grip on his opponent's mawashi and his favourite kimarite was uwatenage (overarm throw).

== Career record ==
Through most of the 1940s, only two tournaments were held a year, and only one was held in 1946. The New Year tournament began and the Spring tournament returned to Osaka in 1953.

Chiyonoyama
-	Spring Haru basho, Tokyo	Summer Natsu basho, Tokyo	Autumn Aki basho, Tokyo
1942	(Maezumo)	Shinjo; 4–0	Not held
1943	East Jonidan #37; 8–0	West Sandanme #17; 5–3	Not held
1944	West Makushita #46; 6–2	West Makushita #12; 4–1	West Jūryō #13; 8–2; Champion
1945	Not held	East Jūryō #2; 6–1; Champion	East Maegashira #10; 10–0
1946	Not held	Not held	East Maegashira #1; 10–3
1947	Not held	West Sekiwake #1; Sat out due to injury 0–0–15	West Maegashira #1; 8–3 ★
1948	Not held	West Sekiwake #1; 4–6–1draw	West Maegashira #1; 8–3; F★★
1949	West Sekiwake #1; 8–5	East Sekiwake #1; 12–3; O	West Ōzeki #1; 13–2
1950	East Ōzeki #1; 12–3	East Ōzeki #1; 9–6	East Ōzeki #1; 11–4
1951	East Ōzeki #1; 8–7	East Ōzeki #1; 14–1	West Yokozuna #2; 9–6
1952	West Yokozuna #2; 13–2	West Yokozuna #1; 10–5	West Yokozuna #1; 11–4
Record given as wins–losses–absences Top division champion Top division runner-up Retired Lower divisions Non-participation Sanshō key: F=Fighting spirit; O=Outstanding performance; T=Technique Also shown: ★=Kinboshi; P=Playoff(s); Divisions: Makuuchi — Jūryō — Makushita — Sandanme — Jonidan — Jonokuchi Makuuchi ranks: Yokozuna — Ōzeki — Sekiwake — Komusubi — Maegashira

-	New Year Hatsu basho, Tokyo	Spring Haru basho, Osaka	Summer Natsu basho, Tokyo	Autumn Aki basho, Tokyo
1953	East Yokozuna #1; 4–4–7	East Yokozuna #2; 1–5–9	East Yokozuna #2; Sat out due to injury 0–0–15	West Yokozuna #2; 11–4
1954	West Yokozuna #1; 10–5	East Yokozuna #2; 10–5	West Yokozuna #1; 12–3	East Yokozuna #1; 12–3
1955	East Yokozuna #1; 12–3–P	East Yokozuna #1; 13–2–P	East Yokozuna #1; 8–7	East Yokozuna #2; 10–4–1draw
1956	West Yokozuna #1; 4–1–10	West Yokozuna #2; 8–7	West Yokozuna #2; 11–4	East Yokozuna #1; Sat out due to injury 0–0–15
Record given as wins–losses–absences Top division champion Top division runner-up Retired Lower divisions Non-participation Sanshō key: F=Fighting spirit; O=Outstanding performance; T=Technique Also shown: ★=Kinboshi; P=Playoff(s); Divisions: Makuuchi — Jūryō — Makushita — Sandanme — Jonidan — Jonokuchi Makuuchi ranks: Yokozuna — Ōzeki — Sekiwake — Komusubi — Maegashira

== Modern top division record ==
- Since the addition of the Kyushu tournament in 1957 and the Nagoya tournament in 1958, the yearly schedule has remained unchanged.

Year	January Hatsu basho, Tokyo	March Haru basho, Osaka	May Natsu basho, Tokyo	July Nagoya basho, Nagoya	September Aki basho, Tokyo	November Kyūshū basho, Fukuoka
1957	West Yokozuna #2; 15–0	East Yokozuna #1; 10–5	East Yokozuna #2; Sat out due to injury 0–0–15	Not held	West Yokozuna #2; 5–8–2	West Yokozuna #2; Sat out due to injury 0–0–15
1958	West Yokozuna #2; 12–3	East Yokozuna #1; 12–3	East Yokozuna #1; 12–3	West Yokozuna #1; Sat out due to injury 0–0–15	East Yokozuna #2; 1–4–10	East Yokozuna #2; Sat out due to injury 0–0–15
1959	East Yokozuna #2; Retired; 3–3–9	x	x	x	x	x
Record given as wins–losses–absences Top division champion Top division runner-up Retired Lower divisions Non-participation Sanshō key: F=Fighting spirit; O=Outstanding performance; T=Technique Also shown: ★=Kinboshi; P=Playoff(s); Divisions: Makuuchi — Jūryō — Makushita — Sandanme — Jonidan — Jonokuchi Makuuchi ranks: Yokozuna — Ōzeki — Sekiwake — Komusubi — Maegashira

== See also ==
- Glossary of sumo terms
- List of past sumo wrestlers
- List of sumo tournament top division champions
- List of sumo tournament top division runners-up
- List of yokozuna

Preceded by Azumafuji Kin'ichi	41st Yokozuna; 1951–1959	Succeeded by Kagamisato Kiyoji
Yokozuna is not a successive rank, and more than one wrestler can hold the title at once
