= Makuuchi =

Highest-ranking of the six divisions of professional sumo

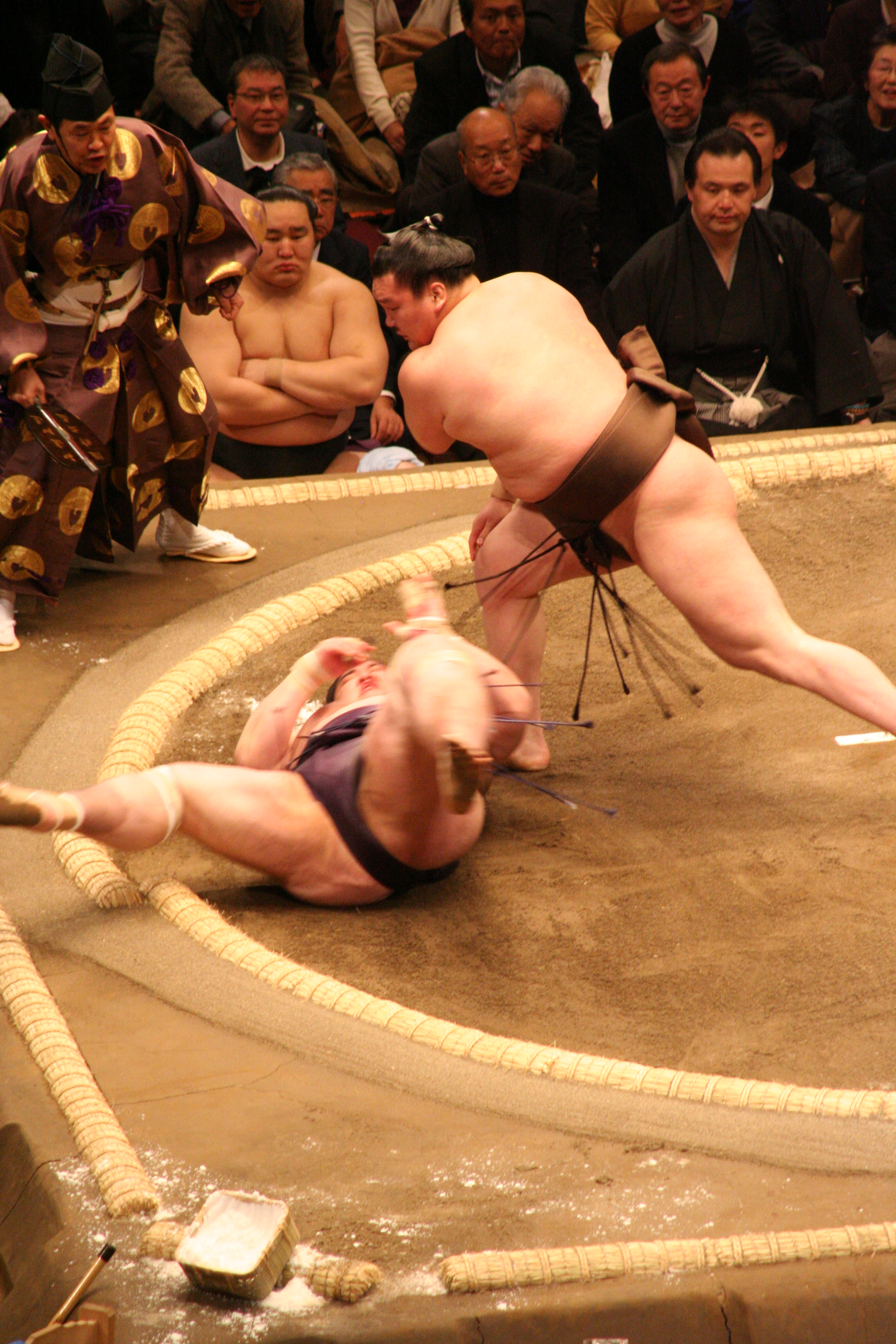
A makuuchi match with the 69th yokozuna Hakuhō defeating Dejima as the 68th yokozuna Asashōryū watches in the background

Makuuchi (幕内), or makunouchi (幕の内), is the top division of the six divisions of professional sumo. Since 2004 its size is fixed at 42 wrestlers (rikishi), ordered into five ranks according to their ability as defined by their performance in previous tournaments.

This is the only division that is featured on NHK's standard live coverage of sumo tournaments. The lower divisions are shown on their satellite coverage, with only the makuuchi broadcast having bilingual English commentary.

Makuuchi literally means "inside the curtain", a reference to the early period of professional sumo, when there was a curtained-off area reserved for the top ranked wrestlers, to sit before appearing for their bouts.

Wrestlers are considered for promotion or demotion in rank before each grand tournament according to their performance in the previous one. Generally, a greater number of wins than losses (kachi-koshi) results in a promotion, and the reverse (make-koshi) results in demotion. There are stricter criteria for promotion to the top two ranks, which are also privileged when considered for demotion.

== Overview ==
At the top fixed positions of the division are the "titleholder" or san'yaku ranks of yokozuna, ōzeki, sekiwake and komusubi. There are typically 8–12 san'yaku wrestlers, with the remainder, called maegashira, ranked in numerical order from 1 downwards.

San'yaku (三役) literally means "the three ranks", even though it has actually comprised four ranks since 1909. The discrepancy arose because the yokozuna was traditionally regarded as an ōzeki with a special license to wear a particular rope around his waist and perform a distinctive ring-entry ceremony. In modern use san'yaku has a somewhat flexible definition. This is largely because the top two ranks of yokozuna and ōzeki have significant differences from the lower two ranks and from each other. Therefore, a reference to san'yaku can sometimes mean only the bottom three ranks, or in other cases only sekiwake and komusubi.

For each banzuke, there must be at least one sekiwake and komusubi on each side, east and west, normally two of each rank, but there may be more. Although there is usually a yokozuna there is no requirement for one, and it has sometimes happened that no active yokozuna or no ōzeki were listed in the ranks. If there is more than one yokozuna but only one ōzeki, the lower rank will be filled out by designating one of the yokozuna as yokozuna-ōzeki. There is no recorded instance of there being fewer than two yokozuna and ōzeki in total.

There are a number of privileges and responsibilities associated with the san'yaku ranks. Any wrestler who reaches one of them is entitled to purchase one of the membership shares in the Japan Sumo Association, regardless of the total number of tournaments they have spent in the top makuuchi division. They may be called on to represent all sumo wrestlers on certain occasions. For example, when the president of the Sumo Association makes a formal speech on the opening and closing days of a tournament, he is flanked by all the san'yaku wrestlers in their mawashi. Similarly they may be called to assist in welcoming a VIP, such as members of the Imperial Family, to the arena.

The san'yaku can be split into two groups: the senior yokozuna and ōzeki, and the junior sekiwake and komusubi.

The former group have special promotion criteria and higher salaries, and have additional perks such as a higher number of junior wrestlers to assist them, an entitlement to park in the Sumo Association compound and voting rights in the election for Association directors. Senior yokozuna and ōzeki also have added responsibilities. They are expected to represent wrestler views to the Association, assist in advertising events and meet event sponsors.

The latter group, sekiwake and komusubi, have lesser responsibilities and just like maegashira are still eligible for one of the three special prizes (sanshō) that are awarded for exceptional performance of lower ranking wrestlers at the end of each tournament.

== Yokozuna ==
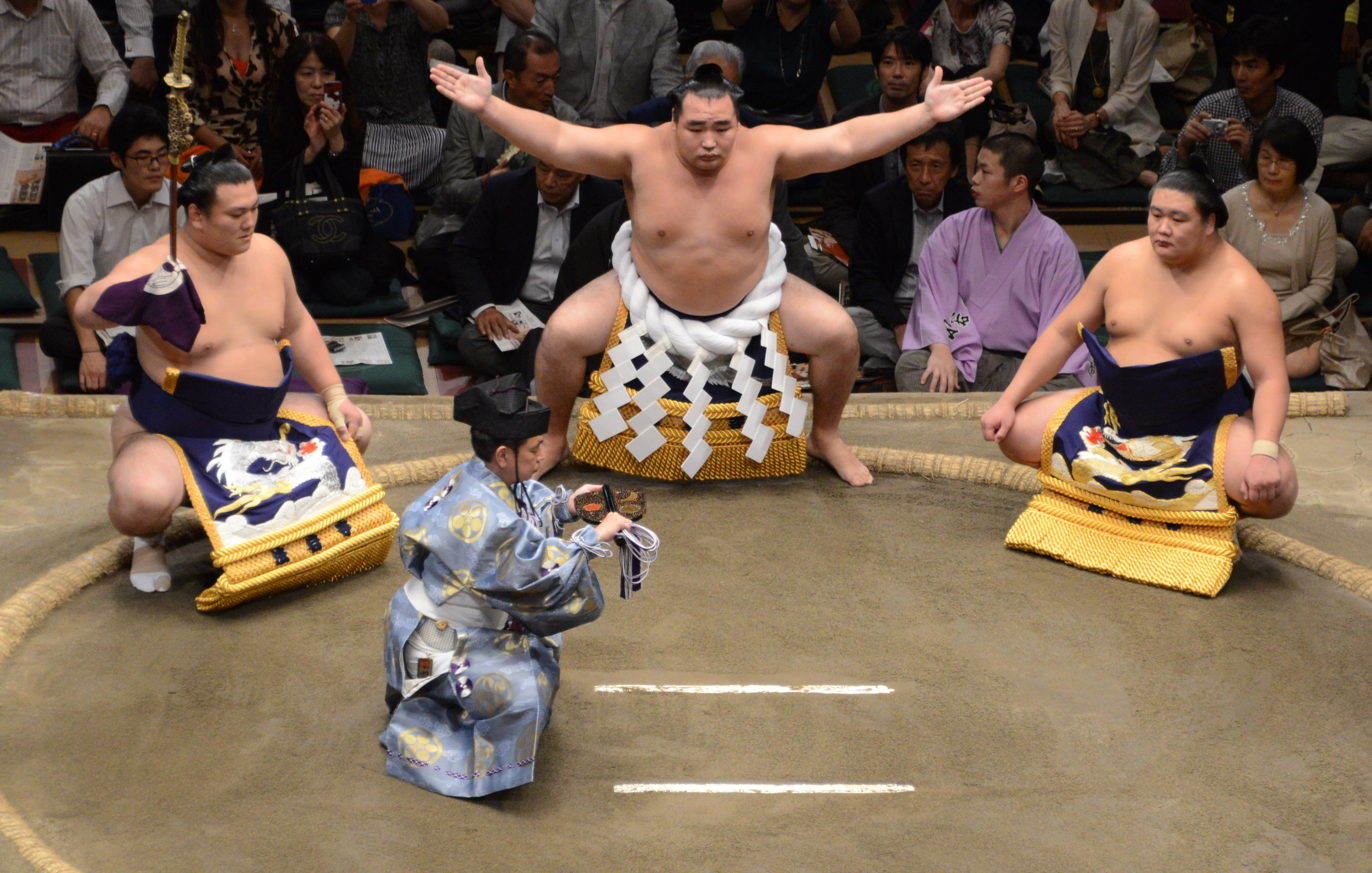
yokozuna Kakuryū Rikisaburō (center) performing the ring-entering ceremony while flanked by a sword bearer on the left and dew sweeper on the right

Yokozuna (横綱; IPA: [jo̞ko̞d͡zɯᵝna]) is the highest rank in sumo. The name literally means 'horizontal rope' and comes from the most visible symbol of their rank, the rope (綱, tsuna) worn around the waist. The rope is similar to the shimenawa used to mark off sacred areas in Shinto, and like the shimenawa it serves to purify and mark off its content. The rope, which may weigh up to 20 kilograms (44 lb), is not used during the matches themselves, but is worn during the yokozuna's dohyō-iri ring entrance ceremony.

As of May 2025, a total of 75 sumo wrestlers are officially recognized by the Japan Sumo Association to have earned the rank of yokozuna; considering that formal record-keeping only began with Tanikaze Kajinosuke and Onogawa Kisaburō in 1789, this roughly averages out to one every three years.

=== History ===
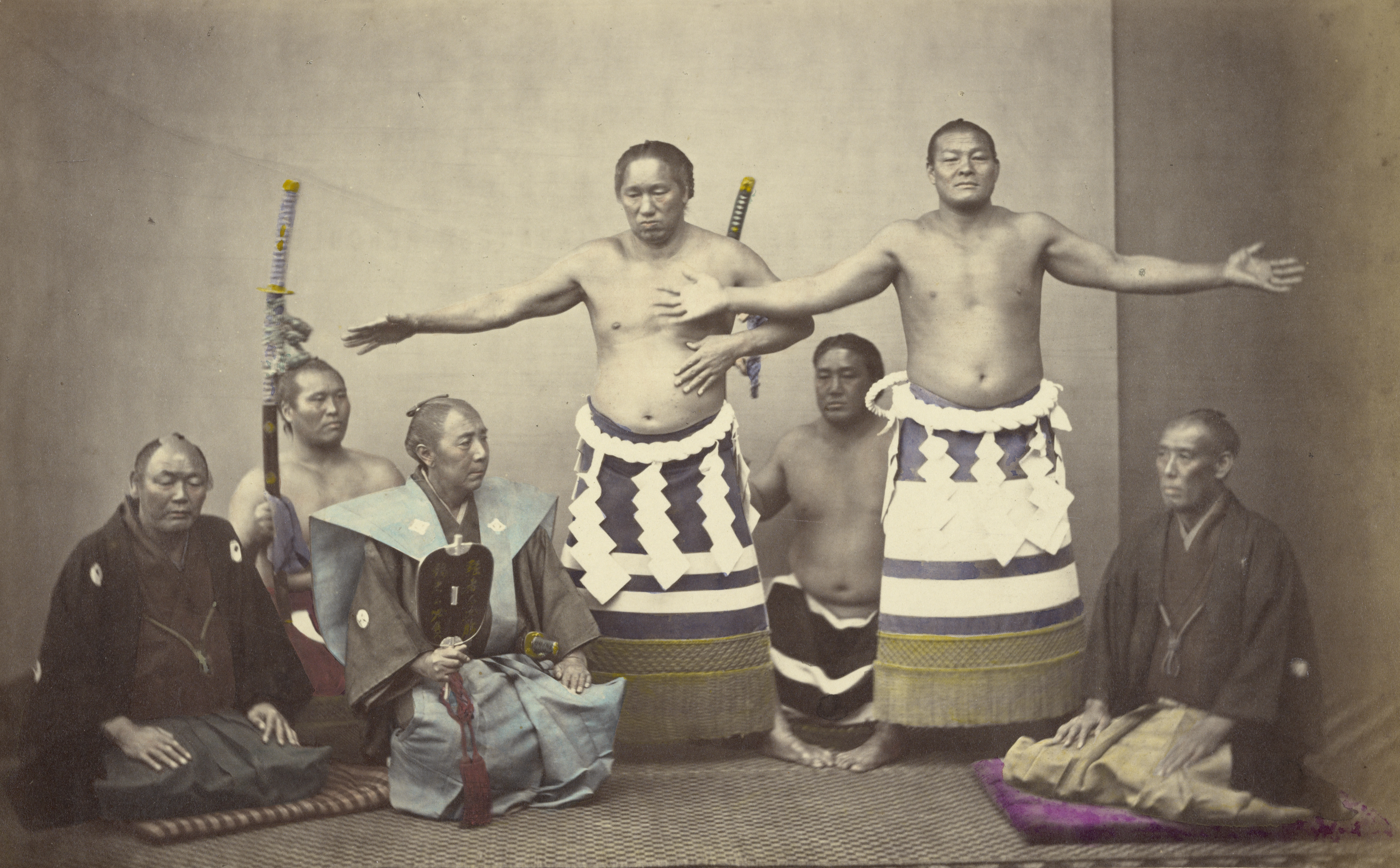
The 11th yokozuna, Shiranui Kōemon and the 13th yokozuna, Kimenzan Tanigorō (1866)

There are two competing legends regarding the origin of the yokozuna rank. According to one, a 9th-century wrestler named Hajikami tied a shimenawa around his waist as a handicap and dared anyone to touch it, creating sumo as it is now known in the process. According to the other, legendary wrestler Akashi Shiganosuke tied the shimenawa around his waist in 1630 as a sign of respect when visiting the Emperor and was posthumously awarded the title for the first time. There is little supporting evidence for either theory—in fact, it is not even certain that Akashi actually existed—but it is known that by November 1789, yokozuna starting from the fourth yokozuna, Tanikaze Kajinosuke, and the fifth yokozuna, Onogawa Kisaburō, were depicted in ukiyo-e prints as wearing the shimenawa. These two wrestlers were both awarded yokozuna licences by the prominent Yoshida family.

Before the Meiji era, the title yokozuna was conferred on ōzeki who performed sumo in front of the shōgun. This privilege was more often determined by a wrestler's patron having sufficient influence rather than purely on the ability and dignity of the wrestler. Thus, there are a number of early wrestlers who were, by modern standards, yokozuna in name only. In these early days, yokozuna was also not regarded as a separate rank in the listings, but as an ōzeki with special dispensation to perform his own ring entering ceremony.

At first, the Yoshida family and the rival Gōjō family fought for the right to award a wrestler a yokozuna license. The Yoshida family won this dispute, because the 15th yokozuna Umegatani Tōtarō I, one of the strongest wrestlers of his time, expressed his wish that he be awarded a license by the Yoshida family in February 1884, and consequently Gōjō family licenses were no longer officially recognized.

In May 1890, the name yokozuna was written on the banzuke for the first time due to the 16th yokozuna Nishinoumi Kajirō I's insistence that his yokozuna status be recorded. In February 1909, during the reigns of the 19th yokozuna, Hitachiyama Taniemon, and the 20th, Umegatani Tōtarō II, it was officially recognized as the highest rank. Since the establishment of the Yokozuna Deliberation Council (横綱審議委員会, Yokozuna-shingi-iinkai) on 21 April 1950, wrestlers have been promoted to yokozuna by the Japan Sumo Association. The first yokozuna promoted by the Sumo Association was the 41st yokozuna Chiyonoyama Masanobu.

=== Criteria for promotion ===
In modern sumo, the qualifications that an ōzeki must satisfy to be promoted are that he has enough power, skill and dignity/grace (品格 hinkaku) to qualify. There are no absolute criteria, nor is there a set quota: there have been periods with no wrestlers at yokozuna rank, and there have been periods with as many as four simultaneously.

The power and skill aspects are usually considered with reference to recent tournament performance. The de facto standard is to win two consecutive championships as ōzeki or an equivalent performance. In the case where the "equivalent performance" criterion is used, the wrestler's record over the previous three tournaments is taken into account with an expectation of at least one tournament victory and one runner-up performance, with none of the three records falling below twelve wins. Thus, a consistent high level of performance is required. Winning two tournaments with a poor performance between them is not usually sufficient. Also, achieving runner-up performance in three consecutive tournaments is not sufficient: an example is ōzeki Kisenosato in 2013 and 2016. The rules are not set in stone; hence, in reaching their conclusion the Yokozuna Deliberation Council and Sumo Association can interpret the criteria more leniently or strictly and also take into account other factors, such as total number of tournament victories, the quality of the wins, and whether the losses show any serious vulnerabilities.

The issue of hinkaku (dignity and grace) is more contentious, as it is essentially a subjective issue. For example, Hawaiian-born ōzeki Konishiki, in particular, was felt by many to be unfairly kept from yokozuna status due to his non-Japanese origin, and many Sumo Association members even openly said that foreigners (gaijin) could never achieve the hinkaku needed to be a yokozuna. In the case of Konishiki, other issues such as his weight were also cited. The debate concerning foreigners having the dignity to be a yokozuna was finally laid to rest on 27 January 1993, when Hawaiian-born ōzeki Akebono was formally promoted to yokozuna after only eight months as an ōzeki. Since then, the issue of whether foreigners have the necessary dignity has become irrelevant as seven of the ten wrestlers to achieve sumo's ultimate rank following Akebono in 1993 were not born in Japan: Musashimaru in the United States and Asashōryū, Hakuhō, Harumafuji, Kakuryū, Terunofuji, and Hōshōryū all in Mongolia.

Other wrestlers have also been held back. For example, Chiyonoyama in the 1950s was not immediately promoted due to his relative youth despite winning consecutive tournaments, although he later achieved the top rank. On the other hand, Futahaguro was given the title of yokozuna in 1986, despite immaturity being cited in opposition to his promotion. After being promoted, he was involved in several misbehaviors that embarrassed the Sumo Association such as hitting one of his tsukebito (manservant or personal assistant) over a trivial matter in a scandal that had six of his seven tsukebito decide to leave him. The promotion again proved to be a fiasco when it was later revealed that he had a heated argument with his stable boss, Tatsunami, and stormed out of the heya, allegedly striking Tatsunami's wife on the way. Futahaguro eventually retired after only one and a half years at the top rank and became the only yokozuna in sumo history ever to retire without having won at least one top division championship.

=== Becoming ===
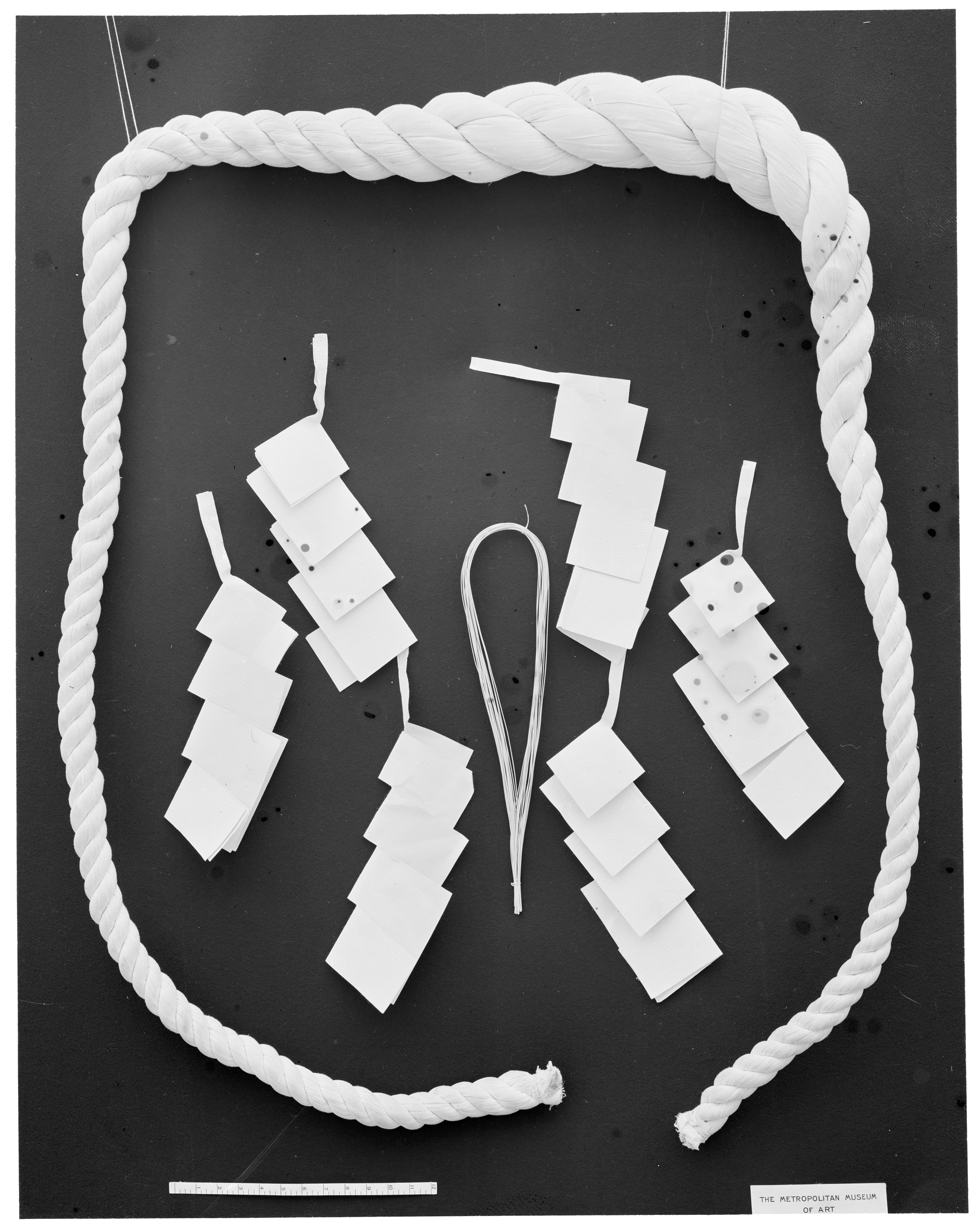
A tsuna belonging to the Metropolitan Museum of Art

Elevation to yokozuna rank is a multi-stage process. After a tournament, the Yokozuna Deliberation Council, a body of lay people (that is, not former sumo wrestlers) who are appointed by the Japan Sumo Association to provide an independent quality control on yokozuna promotion, meet and discuss the performance of the top-ranked wrestlers. Usually, at the instigation of the Japan Sumo Association, they can make a recommendation that a particular ōzeki-ranked wrestler has the necessary attributes to be promoted. Their recommendation is then passed to the Judging division and then the Board of Directors of the Sumo Association who make the final decision.

If a wrestler is deemed to have met the criteria, then he will be visited in his training stable by a member of the Sumo Association Board of Directors who will formally give him the news. In the following days, a tsuna or ceremonial rope will then be made in his stable, and he will practice the ring entrance ceremony with advice from a previous or current yokozuna. Finally, he will have his inaugural ceremonial ring entry ceremony held at Meiji Shrine in Tokyo, which is usually completed within a couple of weeks of the tournament end.

=== Retiring ===
Unlike other sumo ranks, a yokozuna cannot be demoted, but in exchange their performance is held to a very high standard. A yokozuna is expected to regularly win championships, or at least be a serious contender for them, and even a single make-koshi (losing record) can pose concerns. It is common for a yokozuna to withdraw from a tournament for health reasons, even after the tournament has started, if they find themselves unable to perform at the expected level. A yokozuna who is consistently unable to compete at the peak of the sport is expected to retire from competition altogether. The strength and informal nature of these expectations are a major reason that the promotion criteria for yokozuna are so strict in the first place.

Retirement can also in some cases (such as Futahaguro, Asashōryū, or Harumafuji) be prompted by a judgment that the yokozuna has not upheld the dignity of the rank, independent of tournament performance.

=== Notices ===
In extremely rare instances the Yokozuna Deliberation Council can, with over two-thirds of the members in favor, issue notices to yokozuna whose performance as well as poise and character are contrary to what is expected of the rank. These notices are, in increasing level of severity:

- Encouragement (激励, gekirei)
- Warning (注意, chūi)
- Recommendation to Retire (引退勧告, intai kankoku)

Notices have been issued three times since the council's inception in 1950:

- January 2010: Recommendation to Retire issued to Asashōryū.
  The recommendation was issued following allegations that Asashōryū punched and injured an acquaintance in a drunken brawl at a nightclub during the January 2010 tournament. It has been suggested in the media that Asashōryū chose to retire before the Sumo Association could follow through on the council's recommendation.
- November 2018: Encouragement issued to Kisenosato.
  Kisenosato lost his first five matches in the November 2018 tournament before withdrawing. Prior to that, he had withdrawn (either partially or fully) without a winning record in eight out of ten tournaments as yokozuna. The withdrawals were due in part to injuries suffered at the end of his winning tournament run in March 2017. He eventually retired from the sport after three consecutive defeats in the January 2019 basho.
- November 2020: Warning issued to two yokozuna, Hakuhō and Kakuryū.
  According to the council, both wrestlers did not perform to the level required of the yokozuna rank between November 2019 and November 2020. In that timeframe, Hakuhō sufficiently performed three times (yūshō in November 2019 and March 2020, plus a 10-win performance in July 2020) while Kakuryū sufficiently performed just once (runner-up in March 2020 with 12 wins). Both of them sat out of the September 2020 and November 2020 tournaments due to injury.
  The warning to Hakuhō and Kakuryū was upheld in March 2021. Kakuryū sat out for two additional tournaments since the warning was first issued, eventually retiring during the March 2021 basho. After sitting out of the January 2021 tournament due to COVID-19, Hakuhō won two matches in March before withdrawing when doctors told him that he would require kneecap surgery. Hakuhō returned to win the July 2021 tournament with a perfect 15–0 record before retiring.

=== Yokozuna ceremonies and traditions ===
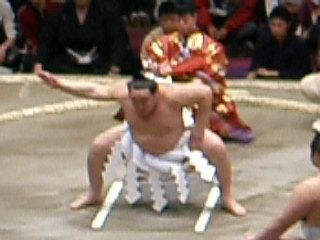
68th yokozuna Asashoryū's Unryū-style Yokozuna Dohyō-iri

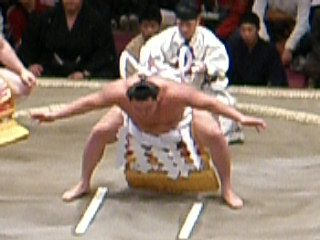
69th yokozuna Hakuhō's Shiranui-style Yokozuna Dohyō-iri

The formal establishment of the rank from Tanikaze's time appears to have in part come from a desire to let the very best have a separate ring entry ceremony (dohyō-iri) from the remaining top division wrestlers. The dohyō-iri is a ceremonial presentation of all the top-division wrestlers that is held before the competitive bouts of the day. The normal ceremony for top-division wrestlers is to be introduced and form a circle around the wrestling ring (dohyō) wearing specially decorated heavy silk "aprons", called keshō-mawashi. A brief symbolic "dance" is carried out before filing off to change into their fighting mawashi and prepare for their bouts.

A yokozuna, however, is introduced after the lower-ranked wrestlers and is flanked by two other top-division wrestler "assistants". The "dewsweeper" or tsuyuharai precedes the yokozuna, while the "sword bearer" or tachimochi follows him into the arena. The sword is a Japanese katana and symbolises the samurai status of the yokozuna. The tachimochi will always be the more highly ranked of the assisting wrestlers. As indicated above, during the ceremony the yokozuna will wear his tsuna around his waist. The ceremonial aprons of all three form a matching set.

Once in the ring, the yokozuna takes centre stage and performs a much more complex ritual dance. The dance can take one of two forms, one of which the yokozuna usually chooses when he is first promoted. In addition to the slightly different routine, the choice of the yokozuna's ritual can also be determined by the knot used to tie the rope around his waist: the "Unryū" style has only one loop at the back, while the "Shiranui" style has two. The styles are named after 10th yokozuna Unryū Kyūkichi and 11th yokozuna Shiranui Kōemon of the Edo period, although there is no historical proof that they actually carried out the dances that have been attributed to them. Indeed, some scholars believe that earlier historians have confused the ring-entering rituals of these two yokozuna.

When a former yokozuna reaches the age of 60, he usually performs a special ring-entering ceremony known as kanreki dohyō-iri, wearing a red tsuna, in celebration of his longevity. This ceremony first took place with the former yokozuna Tachiyama in 1937.

=== Active yokozuna ===
- Hōshōryū, the 74th yokozuna, from Mongolia, promoted January 2025
- Ōnosato, the 75th yokozuna, from Japan, promoted May 2025

== Ōzeki ==
Ōzeki (大関), or champion rank, is immediately below yokozuna in the ranking system. Until the yokozuna rank was introduced, ōzeki was the highest rank attainable. Technically, there must always be a minimum of two ōzeki on the banzuke, one on the east side and one on the west. If there are fewer than two regular ōzeki in practice, then one or more yokozuna will be designated "yokozuna-ōzeki". This was seen for five tournaments from May 1981 to January 1982, when three yokozuna (Wakanohana, Chiyonofuji and Kitanoumi) fulfilled this role at various times. The designation would not be used again until the March 2020 banzuke, when only Takakeishō held the ōzeki rank and Kakuryū was designated yokozuna-ōzeki. In the first three tournaments of 2023, Takakeishō again was the only ōzeki and the yokozuna-ōzeki designation was given to Terunofuji. The promotion of Ōnosato to yokozuna in May 2025 left Kotozakura as the lone ōzeki, and so Ōnosato was given the special designation.

There is no strict limit to the number of ōzeki. In 2012, the banzuke listed a record-high six ōzeki for the May, July, and September tournaments.

=== Promotion to ōzeki ===
The promotion of a wrestler to ōzeki is a multi-tournament process. A wrestler typically will be considered for promotion if he has achieved a total of at least 33 wins over the three most recent tournaments at the rank of either komusubi or sekiwake, including ten or more wins as a sekiwake in the last completed tournament. Promotion is discretionary and there are no hard-and-fast rules, though a three-tournament record of 33 wins while ranked san'yaku throughout is considered a near-guarantee. Starting an ōzeki run from the rank of maegashira is possible as well, but an even higher standard will be applied, such as winning a yūshō and securing 34 wins or more. Other factors toward promotion will include tangibles such as defeating the yokozuna and fellow ōzeki, and the wrestler's overall consistency, prowess, and quality of sumo — for example, a record of illegal maneuvers or reliance on certain dodging techniques would count against the dignity expected of an ōzeki.

Promotions are recommended by the Judging Division to the board of directors of the Japan Sumo Association. If it is a first promotion to the rank, a member of the Board of Directors will formally visit the wrestler's stable to inform the new ōzeki of his promotion. The ōzeki will usually make a speech on this occasion, promising to do his best to uphold the dignity of the rank.

During the Edo period, wrestlers often made their debuts as ōzeki based on size alone, though their real competitiveness had not been tested. The system was called kanban ōzeki (看板大関, guest ōzeki). Most of these vanished from the banzuke soon after, but a few wrestlers, notably Tanikaze Kajinosuke, remained as real wrestlers.

=== Demotion from ōzeki ===
Like the other san'yaku ranks, but unlike a yokozuna, an ōzeki may be relegated. For an ōzeki, relegation is a two-step procedure. First, the ōzeki must have a losing record in a tournament (7–8 or worse), known as a make-koshi. At this point, the ōzeki is called kadoban. If he makes a winning record (8–7 or better) in the next tournament (which is called kachi-koshi), he is restored to regular ōzeki status. If, on the other hand, he suffers another losing record in the next tournament while kadoban, he is relegated to sekiwake in the following tournament. (No matter how badly he does, he will not fall lower than sekiwake.)

If he wins ten or more bouts in this tournament, he is restored to ōzeki for the following tournament. However, if he fails to win ten or more bouts, he is treated just like any other wrestler in any further attempts at being promoted back to ōzeki. This system has been in place since the Nagoya Tournament of 1969. Since that time, seven wrestlers have managed an immediate return to ōzeki: Mienoumi, Takanonami, Musōyama, Tochiazuma (who managed it on two occasions), Tochinoshin, Takakeishō and Aonishiki. Three others–Kaiketsu, Terunofuji and Kirishima–failed to secure ten wins after their first ōzeki demotion, but eventually returned to the ōzeki rank.

Mitakeumi is the only wrestler to be demoted from ōzeki after three consecutive losing records instead of two. He entered the July 2022 basho at kadoban status, but withdrew in the middle of the tournament after a stablemate tested positive for COVID-19. Under the Sumo Association's COVID protocols at the time, Mitakeumi's ōzeki rank and kadoban status were extended to the following tournament in September, where he sustained another losing record and was subsequently demoted.

=== Benefits of being an ōzeki ===
In addition to a salary increase, there are a number of perks associated with reaching ōzeki rank:

- He is guaranteed a higher rank in the Sumo Association when he first retires.
- He will be given a three-year temporary membership of the Sumo Association on his retirement if he does not yet own a share.
- He will receive a special merit payment on his retirement (the amount decided by his strength and longevity as an ōzeki).
- He is given a parking space at the Sumo Association headquarters.
- He can vote in the election of the Sumo Association directors.
- Normally, he will receive additional support from his stable in terms of junior wrestlers to act as his manservants.
- He can wear purple fringed ceremonial aprons (keshō-mawashi).
- He may be called on to represent the wrestlers on formal occasions such as when VIPs visit a sumo tournament, or on formal visits to Shinto shrines.

=== List of active ōzeki ===
- Kirishima, since May 2026 (and previously from July 2023 to May 2024)
- Kotozakura, since March 2024
- Aonishiki, since September 2026 (and previously from January 2026 to May 2026)

=== List of active former ōzeki ===
- Takayasu, from July 2017 to December 2019
- Asanoyama, from May 2020 to July 2021
- Shōdai, from November 2020 to November 2022
- Mitakeumi, from March to September 2022

== Sekiwake ==
Sekiwake (関脇) is the third-highest rank in professional sumo wrestling, and is one of the san'yaku ranks. The term is believed to derive from guarding the ōzeki (大関 or 関) at his side (脇).

It represents the highest rank a wrestler can achieve by continuously making a kachi-koshi (a winning record in the tournament) in tournaments. Promotion to sekiwake depends on either a space being available, which is quite common, or having a record in the previous tournament that is very convincing. Typically 11–4 or better as a komusubi is sufficient for promotion to sekiwake even with no normal space available; lower ranks need progressively more wins. There are special promotion criteria, typically a minimum of 33 wins over three tournaments, for advancement from sekiwake to ōzeki; merely recording consecutive winning records while at the sekiwake rank is not enough to advance. In the 1980s, Sakahoko stayed at sekiwake for nine consecutive tournaments without even getting close to ōzeki consideration, and Goeidō was stuck at the rank for fourteen consecutive tournaments, a modern-day record, between May 2012 and July 2014, before being promoted to ōzeki in September 2014.

Unlike the higher ranks of ōzeki and yokozuna, a wrestler will nearly always lose the rank immediately after having a make-koshi tournament (a losing record during a tournament). Very occasionally, however, a lucky sekiwake might keep his rank even with a 7–8 record if there are no obvious candidates to replace him, as when the komusubi and the upper maegashira have also had losing records. This has happened five times since the six-tournaments-a-year era began in 1958, most recently with Gōeidō in July 2013. In each case, the wrestler was merely moved from the sekiwake East rank to the less prestigious West side.

For many purposes, sekiwake and the komusubi rank are treated together as the junior san'yaku ranks, as opposed to ōzeki and yokozuna. For example, records of number of tournaments ranked in junior san'yaku are often referred to collectively in sumo publications.

For wrestlers reaching this rank, the benefits are similar to that for a komusubi. The salary is higher than for a maegashira and also the wrestler is usually called to appear to flank the chairman of the Sumo Association during the speeches he makes on opening and closing days of the 15-day tournaments that are held six times a year. He may also be called on to represent the wrestlers on behalf of the Sumo Association at other events, especially if the number of ōzeki and yokozuna is low. If this is the highest rank a wrestler reaches, even if it is only for one tournament, he will always be referred to as "former sekiwake (ring name)" after his retirement, an indicator of a successful sumo career, even if not achieving the exceptional standards of the two highest ranks.

Any banzuke must have a minimum of two wrestlers ranked at sekiwake. If circumstances require this can rise to three or four, for example if both sekiwake have winning records and an ōzeki has been demoted. However, this is relatively rare. The minimum of two requirement means that a certain amount of luck can lead to wrestlers achieving this rank on occasion, if the performance of other wrestlers leaves no obvious candidates to fill the rank. This luck factor is less common than it is for komusubi promotions.

=== List of active sekiwake ===
- Atamifuji, since May 2026 (previous rank: komusubi)
- Fujinokawa, since September 2026 (previous rank: maegashira 1)

=== Wrestlers with most sekiwake appearances in history ===
Names in bold indicate a still active wrestler.

| | Name | Total | First | Last | Highest rank |
|---|---|---|---|---|---|
| 1 | Tamagaki | 25 | October 1797 | November 1811 | ōzeki |
| 2 | Kotomitsuki | 22 | January 2001 | July 2007 | ōzeki |
| 3 | Hasegawa | 21 | January 1969 | January 1974 | sekiwake |
| 3 | Kaiō | 21 | January 1995 | July 2000 | ōzeki |
| 3 | Kotonishiki | 21 | November 1990 | January 1997 | sekiwake |
| 6 | Musōyama | 20 | March 1994 | March 2000 | ōzeki |
| 7 | **Mitakeumi** | 19 | November 2016 | November 2022 | ōzeki |
| 8 | Tochiazuma | 17 | September 1997 | November 2001 | ōzeki |
| 8 | Wakanosato | 17 | January 2001 | September 2005 | sekiwake |
| 9 | Nayoroiwa | 15 | May 1938 | March 1953 | ōzeki |
| 9 | Takatōriki | 15 | July 1991 | November 1998 | sekiwake |
| 9 | Gōeidō | 15 | May 2009 | July 2014 | ōzeki |

== Komusubi ==
Komusubi (小結) literally means "the little knot", the knot referring to the match-up between two wrestlers. It is the fourth highest rank in sumo wrestling and is the lowest of the titleholder ranks, or san'yaku.

At komusubi, achieving winning tournament (8–7 or better) is not sufficient to guarantee promotion to a higher rank. Promotion to the next highest rank, sekiwake, depends on either a space being available, which is quite common, or having at least 11 wins in the previous tournament if no normal sekiwake slot is available. This general requirement can be seen by the promotion of Tochiōzan to a third sekiwake slot for March 2014 with 11 wins when the other two sekiwake had winning records, while Tochinoshin was not promoted with 10 wins for November 2015 in a similar situation.

For many purposes, this and the sekiwake rank are treated together as the junior san'yaku ranks, as opposed to ōzeki and yokozuna, where extremely stringent promotion criteria exist. For example, records of number of tournaments ranked in junior san'yaku are often referred to collectively in sumo publications.

For wrestlers reaching this rank, the benefits are a salary increase and also appearing to flank the chairman of the Sumo Association during the speeches he makes on opening and closing days of the official tournaments, held six times a year. He may also be called on to represent the wrestlers on behalf of the Sumo Association at other events, especially if the number of ōzeki and yokozuna are low. If this is the highest rank a wrestler reaches, even if it is only for one tournament, he will always be referred to as "former komusubi (ring name)" after his retirement, an indicator of a successful sumo career, even if not achieving the exceptional standards of the two highest ranks.

Any banzuke must have a minimum of two wrestlers ranked at komusubi. If circumstances require this can rise to three or four, for example if both komusubi have winning records and an upper maegashira produces such a good score that he cannot reasonably be denied a promotion. However, this is relatively rare. The minimum of two requirement means that a certain amount of luck can lead to wrestlers achieving this rank on occasion, if the performance of other wrestlers leaves no obvious candidates to fill the rank.

Komusubi is widely regarded as a difficult rank to maintain, as wrestlers at this rank are likely to face all the ōzeki and yokozuna in the first week of a tournament, with a yokozuna normally scheduled for the opening day. Komusubi face mainly maegashira in the second week, but often by this time wrestlers new to the rank are exhausted and demoralized such that they lose these matches too. Few men making their komusubi debut return a kachi-koshi or winning record in the ensuing tournament, and those that do are likely to promote even higher.

Before World War II, when there were fewer tournaments per year and more weight was placed on the performance at each tournament, there were several instances of komusubi immediately advancing to ōzeki after nearly winning a tournament, but there have been no instances of this since then. Today being currently ranked at sekiwake is a necessary condition for any further promotion in addition to exceptional performance.

=== List of active komusubi ===
- Hakunofuji, since September 2026 (previous rank: maegashira 3)
- Daieishō, since September 2026 (previous rank: maegashira 4)

=== Wrestlers with most komusubi appearances in history ===
Names in bold indicate a still active wrestler.

| | Name | Total | First | Last | Highest rank |
|---|---|---|---|---|---|
| 1 | Miyagino | 23 | October 1818 | January 1834 | sekiwake |
| 2 | Takamiyama | 19 | November 1969 | January 1979 | sekiwake |
| 3 | Akinoshima | 15 | November 1988 | September 2000 | sekiwake |
| 4 | Dewanishiki | 14 | May 1950 | May 1962 | sekiwake |
| 4 | **Takayasu** | 14 | September 2013 | May 2026 | ōzeki |
| 4 | Tochiōzan | 14 | May 2009 | September 2017 | sekiwake |
| 6 | Amatsukaze | 13 | March 1765 | March 1778 | sekiwake |
| 6 | Kotonishiki | 13 | September 1990 | January 1999 | sekiwake |
| 6 | Tosanoumi | 13 | January 1996 | September 2003 | sekiwake |
| 6 | Wakabayama | 13 | January 1925 | May 1933 | sekiwake |

== Maegashira ==
Maegashira (前頭) is the lowest of five ranks in the top makuuchi division.

All the makuuchi wrestlers who are not ranked in san'yaku are ranked as maegashira, numbered from one at the top downwards. In each rank there are two wrestlers, the higher ranked is designated as "east" and the lower as "west", so No. 1 east is treated as a higher rank than No. 1 west, and so on.

The number of wrestlers in makuuchi is fixed (at 42 since 2004) but the number in san'yaku is not. Thus, the number of maegashira ranks can vary, but is typically between 15 and 17. (This gives a makuuchi division split of around 10 san'yaku and 32 maegashira).

Movement within the maegashira ranks can be minor or extreme, depending on a wrestler's score in the previous 15-bout tournament. For example, a maegashira 2 who has an 8–7 record might only be promoted one level to maegashira 1 for the next tournament. Conversely, a maegashira 14 who wins the division championship could be promoted as high as komusubi. Indeed, this happened in March 2000 when Takatōriki won the championship with a 13–2 record.

Maegashira ranked five or below are likely to only fight amongst themselves (unless their winning record in the middle of a tournament prompts their scheduling with higher-ranked wrestlers) while those ranked maegashira four or above (jōi-jin) are likely to have several matches against san'yaku wrestlers, including ōzeki and yokozuna. Wrestlers at maegashira 1 and 2 will usually face everybody in the san'yaku (outside of their own stable and family), and these are therefore considered very difficult ranks to maintain. If a lower-ranked maegashira has a score which puts them in contention for the title in the second week of the tournament, it is common for them to be matched against increasingly higher-ranked opponents later in the basho; for instance, in January 2020, the lowest-ranked wrestler in the tournament, maegashira 17 Tokushōryū, was in contention for the title having only faced opponents in the lower half of the banzuke and was matched against ōzeki Takakeisho, the highest-ranked rikishi participating in the tournament, on the final day, clinching the yūshō with his victory.

When a maegashira defeats a yokozuna, it is called a gold star or kinboshi and he is rewarded monetarily for the victory for the remainder of his career. A bout where a wrestler earns a kinboshi by defeating a yokozuna generally causes great excitement at a sumo venue and it used to be common for audience members to throw their seat cushions into the ring (and onto the wrestlers) after such a bout, though this is technically prohibited and has significantly decreased in recent times.

=== Wrestlers with most maegashira appearances without a san'yaku title ===
Names in bold indicate a still active wrestler.

| Total | Wrestler | First | Last | Highest rank |
|---|---|---|---|---|
| 60 | **Sadanoumi** | May 2014 | November 2025 | Maegashira 1 |
| 53 | Higonoumi | March 1993 | November 2001 | Maegashira 1 |
| 52 | Asanowaka | March 1994 | May 2004 | Maegashira 1 |
| 52 | Toyohibiki | July 2007 | May 2017 | Maegashira 2 |
| 51 | Kotoryū | July 1996 | March 2005 | Maegashira 1 |
| 50 | Tokitsuumi | September 1998 | September 2007 | Maegashira 3 |
| 49 | Kitakachidoki | January 1989 | May 1998 | Maegashira 1 |
| 46 | Minatofuji | July 1993 | July 2001 | Maegashira 2 |
| 44 | Narutoumi | October 1949 | November 1960 | Maegashira 1 |
| 43 | Daiyū | May 1963 | September 1972 | Maegashira 1 |
| 43 | Hirosegawa | January 1943 | May 1958 | Maegashira 3 |

== See also ==
- Glossary of sumo terms
- List of sumo record holders
- List of sumo top division champions
- List of sumo top division runners-up
- Professional sumo divisions
- List of active sumo wrestlers
- List of past sumo wrestlers
