= Kurohimeyama Hideo =

Japanese sumo wrestler (1948–2019)

Personal information
- Native name: 黒姫山 秀男
- Born: Hideo Tanaka; 12 November 1948 Ōmi, Niigata, Japan
- Died: 25 April 2019 (aged 70)
- Height: 1.82 m (5 ft 11 1/2 in)
- Weight: 143 kg (315 lb)

Sport
- Sport: Sumo
- Retired: January, 1982
- Heya: Tatsunami
- Record: 677-691-2
- Debut: March, 1964
- Highest rank: Sekiwake (July, 1974)
- Elder name: Takekuma
- Special Prizes: Outstanding Performance (4); Fighting Spirit (3); Technique (1)
- Gold Stars: 6 Kitanoumi (3); Kitanofuji; Kotozakura; Wajima
- Updated on June 2020

Kurohimeyama Hideo (12 November 1948 – 25 April 2019), born as Hideo Tanaka, was a sumo wrestler from Ōmi, Niigata, Japan.

== Career ==
Growing up he was not a fan of sumo, preferring professional wrestling. However he decided to try professional sumo after completing junior high primarily to relieve the burden on his family, as they were poor with his father relying on migrant work. He was surprised to discover after joining sumo that his professional wrestling hero Rikidozan had started out as a sumo wrestler. He was recruited by Tatsunami stable, whose stablemaster, ex-yokozuna Haguroyama, was also a Niigata Prefecture native. He made his professional debut in March 1964. He was given the shikona of Kurohimeyama after a mountain range in Itoigawa. The stable was large, with around 60 wrestlers, and he was expected to get up early to begin training, which was not a problem for him as he had had an early morning newspaper round as a child. Moving up the ranks he was a personal attendant or tsukebito to Annenyama and former ōzeki Wakahaguro. He made the jūryō division in March 1969 (alongside stablemate Asahikuni and also Mienoumi) and reached the top makuuchi division just two tournaments later in July 1969.

After he was re-promoted to the top division in November 1969 he fought there for 71 consecutive tournaments and 1065 matches, never missing a single bout. He made his sanyaku debut at komusubi in November 1970 and although he only scored six wins against nine losses, he defeated yokozuna Taihō in this tournament. His highest rank was sekiwake, which he finally obtained in July 1974. He made 18 appearances in the lower sanyaku ranks (sekiwake or komusubi) but unusually for someone with that level of success never won a tournament championship (yusho) in any division. He was twice runner-up in the top division however, in November 1971 (where he defeated the eventual winner, yokozuna Kitanofuji, to earn the first of his six career kinboshi) and in November 1973 (where he also defeated the tournament winner Wajima, but only by default, as the yokozuna had injured himself the previous day and withdrew). Both of these were 11–4 performances. He had another resurgence in late 1978 and early 1979, where for three straight tournaments he earned a special prize – one Fighting Spirit and two Outstanding Performance – and defeated a yokozuna (Kitanoumi twice and Wajima once). His other kinboshi came against Kotozakura in March 1973 and Kitanoumi in May 1975. He had four career wins over Kitanoumi in total when he was at the yokozuna rank, although one was when Kurohimeyama was ranked as a sekiwake (in May 1977) so he did not get a kinboshi credit on that occasion. His final makuuchi tournament was in July 1981, and he retired three tournaments later when demotion to makushita was certain. His final career record was 677 wins against 691 losses, with just two absences early in his career, in the sandanme division.

== Retirement from sumo ==
He retired in January 1982 and became an elder in the Japan Sumo Association. He worked as a coach at Tatsunami stable, and his two sons were both wrestlers there under the shikona of Haguronada and Hagurokuni. He borrowed the Nishikijima, Yamahibiki, Dekiyama and Kitajin elder names before permanently acquiring the Takekuma name in 1988, upon the mandatory retirement of ex-sekiwake Kitanonada (who was his father-in-law, as he had married Kitanonada's daughter in 1973). Following the retirement of Tatsunami's stablemaster (ex-Annenyama) in 1999 he branched out to open up his own Takekuma stable, not wishing to overshadow Tatsunami's new stablemaster (ex-komusubi Asahiyutaka) who was some 20 years his junior. He took his sons with him, but Takekuma attracted no new recruits and folded in 2004 after only five years when his only remaining wrestler (Hagurokuni) retired. He moved to Tomozuna stable in an assistant coach role, and reached the Sumo Association's mandatory retirement age of 65 in November 2013.

He suffered a cerebral infarction in March 2018, and died at the age of 70 on 25 April 2019 from pneumonia.

== Fighting style ==
He was primarily a pusher-thruster, his most common winning kimarite or technique being oshi dashi or push out. Due to his strong tachi–ai or initial charge he was nicknamed Degoichi (デゴイチ) after the D51 steam locomotive.

== Personal life ==
Kurohiyama has a grandson (Toranosuke) who wrestles for Sakaigawa stable since 2018, because he wanted the challenge of joining a stable with no connection to his grandfather's. In April 2023, another of his grandson, Kaito Fujihara (the son of his eldest daughter), became a professional wrestler under his own name at Tokitsukaze stable. He decided to join professional sumo at the age of 15 on the advice of his grandfather who wanted him to become a professional only after graduating from junior high school. At the July 2023 banzuke announcement, it was announced that his grandson Toranosuke, who wrestled in the makushita division under the ring name "Tanakayama", would inherit his grandfather's shikona.

== Career record ==
Kurohimeyama Hideo
Year	January Hatsu basho, Tokyo	March Haru basho, Osaka	May Natsu basho, Tokyo	July Nagoya basho, Nagoya	September Aki basho, Tokyo	November Kyūshū basho, Fukuoka
1964	x	(Maezumo)	East Jonokuchi #6; 4–3	East Jonidan #100; 5–2	West Jonidan #46; 5–2	East Jonidan #1; 4–3
1965	West Sandanme #80; 3–4	West Sandanme #95; 1–4–2	West Jonidan #21; 5–2	West Sandanme #75; 5–2	East Sandanme #45; 3–4	East Sandanme #55; 4–3
1966	West Sandanme #44; 5–2	East Sandanme #21; 4–3	West Sandanme #12; 2–5	West Sandanme #31; 5–2	East Makushita #96; 5–2	West Makushita #69; 5–2
1967	East Makushita #53; 4–3	West Makushita #43; 5–2	West Makushita #38; 4–3	West Makushita #29; 6–1	West Makushita #12; 5–2	East Makushita #6; 2–5
1968	West Makushita #20; 3–4	East Makushita #25; 6–1	East Makushita #9; 5–2	East Makushita #3; 5–2	West Makushita #1; 3–4	West Makushita #4; 5–2
1969	West Makushita #1; 5–2	West Jūryō #10; 10–5	West Jūryō #2; 9–6	West Maegashira #11; 4–11	West Jūryō #4; 11–4	East Maegashira #12; 9–6
1970	East Maegashira #5; 9–6; F	East Maegashira #1; 3–12	East Maegashira #10; 8–7	West Maegashira #5; 6–9	West Maegashira #6; 9–6	West Komusubi #1; 6–9
1971	West Maegashira #1; 4–11	East Maegashira #4; 7–8	West Maegashira #4; 6–9	West Maegashira #5; 10–5; T	West Komusubi #1; 5–10	West Maegashira #2; 11–4 ★O
1972	West Komusubi #1; 5–10	West Maegashira #4; 7–8	East Maegashira #6; 8–7	West Maegashira #3; 8–7	East Maegashira #2; 7–8	East Maegashira #4; 7–8
1973	West Maegashira #5; 9–6	East Maegashira #1; 8–7 ★	West Komusubi #1; 6–9	West Maegashira #2; 6–9	East Maegashira #4; 7–8	West Maegashira #5; 11–4; F
1974	West Komusubi #2; 8–7	East Komusubi #1; 8–7	East Komusubi #1; 9–6	West Sekiwake #2; 7–8	West Komusubi #2; 9–6	West Sekiwake #1; 9–6
1975	West Sekiwake #2; 8–7	West Sekiwake #1; 3–12	West Maegashira #4; 6–9 ★	East Maegashira #7; 8–7	East Maegashira #4; 6–9	West Maegashira #7; 8–7
1976	West Maegashira #4; 7–8	West Maegashira #6; 6–9	East Maegashira #10; 8–7	West Maegashira #7; 8–7	West Maegashira #5; 9–6	East Komusubi #1; 8–7
1977	East Komusubi #1; 8–7	East Sekiwake #1; 8–7	East Sekiwake #1; 8–7; O	East Sekiwake #1; 3–12	West Maegashira #7; 9–6	West Maegashira #1; 5–10
1978	West Maegashira #6; 8–7	West Maegashira #3; 5–10	West Maegashira #8; 8–7	East Maegashira #5; 5–10	West Maegashira #9; 7–8	East Maegashira #10; 9–6 ★F
1979	West Maegashira #3; 8–7 ★O	West Maegashira #1; 8–7 ★O	West Sekiwake #1; 4–11	East Maegashira #4; 7–8	West Maegashira #6; 6–9	East Maegashira #9; 8–7
1980	East Maegashira #4; 5–10	West Maegashira #10; 9–6	West Maegashira #4; 5–10	West Maegashira #7; 8–7	East Maegashira #5; 6–9	West Maegashira #8; 8–7
1981	East Maegashira #4; 5–10	East Maegashira #9; 6–9	East Maegashira #11; 9–6	East Maegashira #9; 4–11	West Jūryō #1; 6–9	East Jūryō #5; 6–9
1982	West Jūryō #8; Retired; 2–10	x	x	x	x	x
Record given as wins–losses–absences Top division champion Top division runner-up Retired Lower divisions Non-participation Sanshō key: F=Fighting spirit; O=Outstanding performance; T=Technique Also shown: ★=Kinboshi; P=Playoff(s); Divisions: Makuuchi — Jūryō — Makushita — Sandanme — Jonidan — Jonokuchi Makuuchi ranks: Yokozuna — Ōzeki — Sekiwake — Komusubi — Maegashira

== See also ==
- Glossary of sumo terms
- List of past sumo wrestlers
- List of sumo tournament top division runners-up
- List of sumo tournament second division champions
- List of sekiwake
