= Hanakaze Daisaku =

Japanese sumo wrestler

Hanakaze Daisaku 華吹 大作
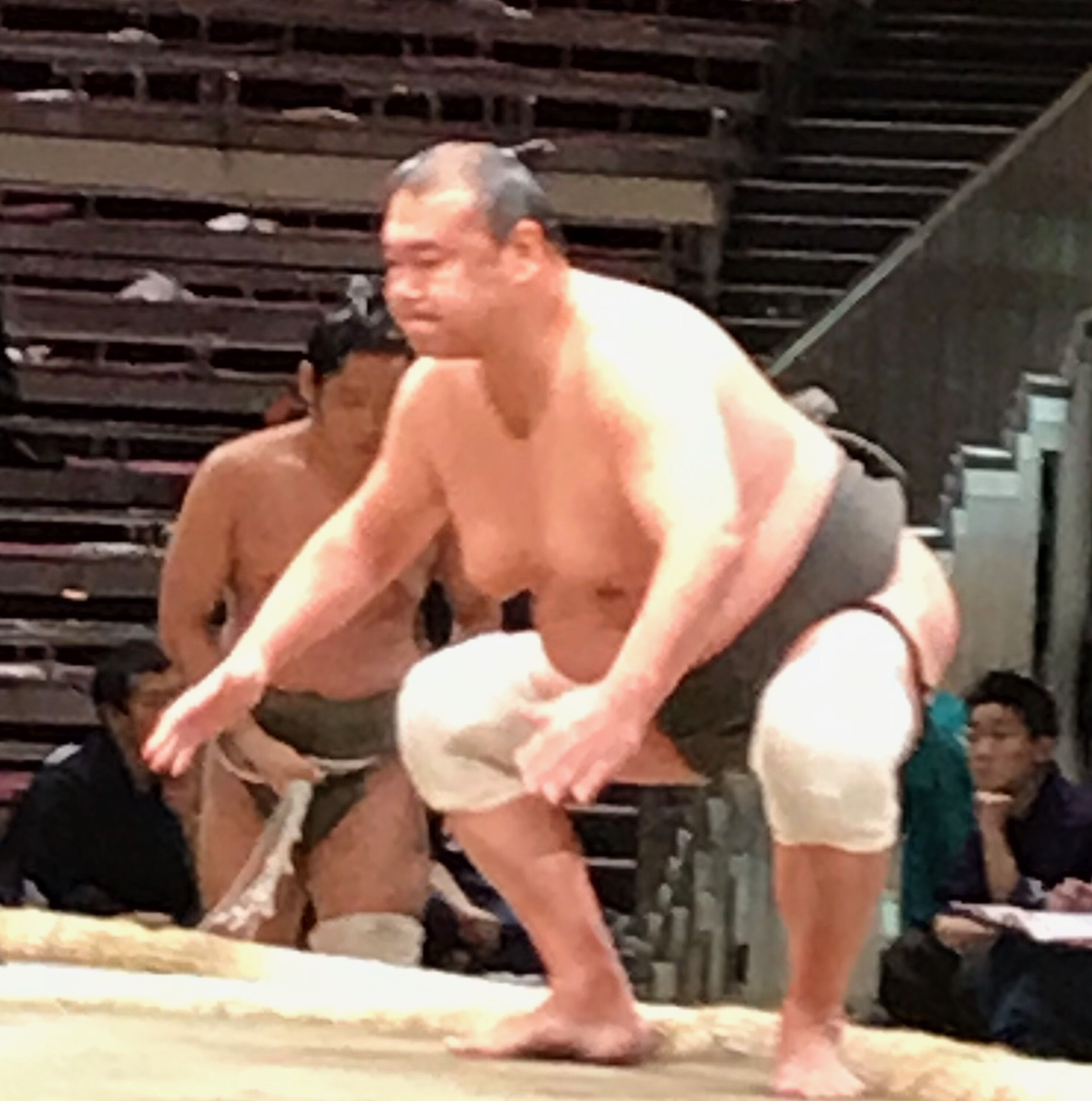
- Hanakaze in 2019

Personal information
- Born: Yamaguchi Daisaku; May 28, 1970 (age 56) Adachi, Tokyo
- Height: 1.8 m (5 ft 11 in)
- Weight: 129 kg (284 lb)

Sport
- Sport: Sumo
- Retired: January 2022
- Heya: Tatsunami
- Record: 683-788-13
- Debut: March, 1986
- Highest rank: Sandanme 18 (November 2003)
- Updated on 25 January 2022

Hanakaze Daisaku (Japanese: 華吹 大作; born 28 May 1970 as Daisaku Yamaguchi (山口 大作)) is a retired Japanese professional sumo wrestler from Tokyo. He made his debut in March, 1986 and wrestled for Tatsunami stable. Despite never rising higher than the fourth division (sandanme), he has set several records for longevity in the sport. He competed in a total of 214 tournaments, and was the last wrestler who began his career in the Shōwa era to retire. Consequently, he is the only wrestler to fight in the Shōwa, Heisei and Reiwa eras. He is also one of very few in sumo's long history who wrestled into his sixth decade.

== Career ==
Daisaku Yamaguchi joined sumo out of junior high school in March 1986, in the era of the yokozuna Futahaguro and Hokutoumi, and one year before his future stablemaster, the 7th Tatsunami elder, former komusubi, Asahiyutaka.

In the beginning of his career, he had three losing tournaments in a row, missing his fourth tournament, and dropped off the banzuke by the end of 1986. He returned to active sumo in March 1987, exactly one year after his initial debut. In this tournament he became the first wrestler to win a match in the newly rebuilt Osaka Prefectural Gymnasium. He would compete in every tournament for the next 31 years, although he would occasionally miss matches within tournaments due to injury. It would be July 1987 before he would receive his first kachi-koshi (majority of wins) in a tournament. He got his first 6–1 record in November 1988, a feat he achieved nine times in his career. He never had an undefeated 7-0 tournament. Conversely, in tournaments he was active in, he had a winless 0–7 tournament three times in his career. Two of those occasions were the first and last tournaments of the Heisei era (January 1989 and March 2019). His highest rank achieved is sandanme 18 in November 2003, which was incidentally one of his winless tournaments. He battled for thirteen years with the shikona of Tatsuyamaguchi before changing it to Hanakaze in July 1999. He was promoted to the sandanme division a record 19 times. Restricted by injuries, in 2019 he briefly fell into the lowest jonokuchi division for the first time in 31 years.

Though Hanakaze never reached the top, salaried ranks, he has a number of notable longevity records. Upon the retirement of Tochitenkō in May 2011 he became the oldest active wrestler in sumo, and also simultaneously tied with Hokutōryū for longest active career as they both joined sumo in March 1986. In 2016, both Hanakaze and Hokutōryū simultaneously became the longest serving sumo wrestlers ever, passing the largely uninterrupted, nearly 30-year career set by the legendary Miyagino Nishikinosuke (active 1766–1796, a contemporary of Tanikaze, historically accepted as the sport's first documented yokozuna). After Hokutōryū retired following the March 2017 tournament, Hanakaze solely holds the record for longest career ever in the centuries long history of sumo; a career spanning 33 years as of March 2019. He was also the last remaining active wrestler who began his career in the Shōwa era, which ended in January 1989. He reached another milestone in the following May tournament, when he passed already retired Ichinoya to become the oldest wrestler since the beginning of the Shōwa era, which began in 1926.

Other records he holds are most tournaments ever in the history of sumo (214) and the record for most consecutive tournaments, from March 1987 to January 2022. As of January 2022 he has fought 1471 bouts, with 683 wins against 788 losses, plus 13 injury absences. As he has only fought seven matches per tournament, as opposed to sekitori ranked wrestlers who fight all 15 days, he does not hold any record for most bouts contested or most consecutive bouts. He has the sixth highest number of wins among active wrestlers.

Hanakaze turned 50 years of age in May 2020. By comparison, the mandatory retirement age for elders is 65. His stablemaster attributed his longevity to his "abundance of spiritual power and physical durability" and commented "the important duties in our communal kitchen make him irreplaceable". Having never reached the sekitori level, he was not eligible for any retirement benefits despite his many years in sumo. Former yokozuna Kitanofuji has reportedly said, "If you can’t climb any higher than the third division, you’re better off quitting and returning home to the countryside."

In July 2020 he fought the 42-year-old Tenichi for the first time since July 1996 – a gap between meetings of 24 years. The combined age of the two wrestlers was 92.

== Retirement from sumo ==
The Sumo Association announced Hanakaze's retirement on 25 January 2022. He had originally planned to retire in 2020 when he turned 50, but this was delayed due to the coronavirus pandemic. He is involved in the opening of a chankonabe restaurant in Hyogo Prefecture.

== Fighting style ==
Hanakaze’s most common winning kimarite were uwatenage (overarm throw) hatakikomi (slap down) and yorikiri (force out).

== Career record ==
Hanakaze Daisaku
Year	January Hatsu basho, Tokyo	March Haru basho, Osaka	May Natsu basho, Tokyo	July Nagoya basho, Nagoya	September Aki basho, Tokyo	November Kyūshū basho, Fukuoka
1986	x	(Maezumo)	West Jonokuchi #49; 2–5	West Jonokuchi #50; 3–4	West Jonokuchi #44; 3–4	East Jonokuchi #32; Sat out due to injury 0–0–7
1987	(Maezumo)	West Jonokuchi #37; 3–4	West Jonidan #152; 3–4	West Jonokuchi #3; 4–3	West Jonidan #126; 3–4	East Jonidan #137; 2–5
1988	East Jonokuchi #14; 2–5	East Jonokuchi #19; 2–2–3	East Jonokuchi #1; 3–4	West Jonokuchi #8; 4–3	West Jonidan #128; 3–4	West Jonidan #143; 6–1
1989	West Jonidan #69; 0–7	East Jonidan #125; 5–2	East Jonidan #83; 3–4	West Jonidan #108; 3–4	West Jonidan #125; 4–3	West Jonidan #85; 3–4
1990	West Jonidan #105; 4–3	East Jonidan #72; 4–3	West Jonidan #41; 1–6	East Jonidan #87; 4–3	East Jonidan #53; 3–4	West Jonidan #70; 3–4
1991	West Jonidan #92; 4–3	East Jonidan #58; 4–3	West Jonidan #34; 3–4	West Jonidan #52; 4–3	East Jonidan #27; 2–5	West Jonidan #50; 4–3
1992	West Jonidan #30; 2–5	West Jonidan #62; 2–5	East Jonidan #100; 4–3	West Jonidan #72; 4–3	East Jonidan #51; 5–2	West Jonidan #10; 2–5
1993	East Jonidan #42; 2–5	West Jonidan #77; 6–1	East Jonidan #8; 3–4	West Jonidan #27; 3–4	East Jonidan #47; 3–4	West Jonidan #65; 5–2
1994	West Jonidan #34; 3–4	West Jonidan #57; 2–5	East Jonidan #85; 6–1	West Jonidan #14; 4–3	West Sandanme #93; 3–4	West Jonidan #14; 3–4
1995	West Jonidan #30; 3–4	East Jonidan #55; 6–1	East Sandanme #93; 4–3	West Sandanme #75; 2–5	West Jonidan #10; 4–3	West Sandanme #89; 2–5
1996	West Jonidan #20; 6–1	East Sandanme #63; 4–3	West Sandanme #44; 2–5	West Sandanme #72; 3–4	East Sandanme #89; 3–4	West Jonidan #5; 4–3
1997	West Sandanme #85; 6–1	East Sandanme #32; 1–6	East Sandanme #69; 4–3	West Sandanme #50; 3–4	West Sandanme #68; 4–3	West Sandanme #50; 2–5
1998	West Sandanme #74; 4–3	West Sandanme #56; 4–3	East Sandanme #43; 2–5	East Sandanme #63; 2–5	West Sandanme #85; 2–5	West Jonidan #9; 4–3
1999	East Sandanme #93; 2–5	West Jonidan #17; 4–3	West Sandanme #98; 4–3	West Sandanme #78; 3–4	West Sandanme #88; 2–5	East Jonidan #13; 2–5
2000	East Jonidan #39; 4–3	East Jonidan #17; 1–6	West Jonidan #47; 5–2	West Jonidan #8; 6–1	West Sandanme #55; 2–5	East Sandanme #76; 3–4
2001	West Sandanme #96; 4–3	East Sandanme #79; 2–5	East Jonidan #1; 5–2	East Sandanme #67; 3–4	West Sandanme #84; 4–3	East Sandanme #68; 4–3
2002	East Sandanme #51; 2–5	East Sandanme #77; 3–4	East Sandanme #98; 2–5	West Jonidan #21; 3–4	East Jonidan #42; 5–2	West Jonidan #2; 2–5
2003	West Jonidan #31; 4–3	East Jonidan #11; 3–4	East Jonidan #30; 4–3	East Jonidan #8; 5–2	West Sandanme #74; 6–1	East Sandanme #18; 0–7
2004	East Sandanme #69; 2–5	West Sandanme #92; 3–4	East Jonidan #11; 3–4	West Jonidan #28; 4–3	West Jonidan #8; 3–4	East Jonidan #27; 5–2
2005	East Sandanme #92; 4–3	East Sandanme #73; 4–3	East Sandanme #56; 2–5	West Sandanme #77; 2–5	West Jonidan #6; 4–3	West Sandanme #88; 4–3
2006	West Sandanme #69; 1–6	East Jonidan #8; 4–3	West Sandanme #89; 3–4	East Jonidan #5; 2–5	East Jonidan #34; 3–4	East Jonidan #54; 5–2
2007	West Jonidan #13; 5–2	East Sandanme #83; 2–5	East Jonidan #13; 4–3	East Sandanme #93; 3–4	West Jonidan #9; 2–5	East Jonidan #39; 4–3
2008	West Jonidan #14; 2–5	East Jonidan #42; 4–3	East Jonidan #16; 3–4	West Jonidan #34; 4–3	West Jonidan #9; 0–4–3	West Jonidan #69; 5–2
2009	West Jonidan #32; 4–3	West Jonidan #11; 3–4	East Jonidan #33; 2–5	East Jonidan #70; 4–3	West Jonidan #43; 5–2	East Jonidan #5; 2–5
2010	East Jonidan #39; 4–3	East Jonidan #16; 5–2	West Sandanme #84; 2–5	East Jonidan #15; 3–4	West Jonidan #36; 3–4	West Jonidan #64; 4–3
2011	West Jonidan #35; 3–4	Tournament Cancelled; 0–0–0	West Jonidan #61; 5–2	East Jonidan #9; 2–5	West Jonidan #40; 4–3	East Jonidan #22; 3–4
2012	West Jonidan #45; 3–4	West Jonidan #71; 4–3	West Jonidan #44; 4–3	West Jonidan #19; 3–4	West Jonidan #45; 4–3	West Jonidan #20; 3–4
2013	West Jonidan #42; 4–3	East Jonidan #16; 3–4	East Jonidan #46; 3–4	West Jonidan #71; 3–4	West Jonidan #84; 6–1	East Jonidan #11; 3–4
2014	East Jonidan #31; 1–6	West Jonidan #68; 4–3	East Jonidan #41; 3–4	East Jonidan #64; 4–3	East Jonidan #35; 5–2	East Sandanme #99; 3–4
2015	East Jonidan #19; 2–5	West Jonidan #50; 4–3	East Jonidan #25; 3–4	West Jonidan #44; 4–3	West Jonidan #20; 3–4	West Jonidan #45; 4–3
2016	West Jonidan #21; 5–2	West Sandanme #86; 1–6	East Jonidan #28; 5–2	West Sandanme #93; 1–6	East Jonidan #32; 3–4	West Jonidan #57; 4–3
2017	East Jonidan #30; 2–5	West Jonidan #60; 4–3	West Jonidan #28; 2–5	West Jonidan #61; 4–3	East Jonidan #35; 2–5	East Jonidan #71; 5–2
2018	East Jonidan #26; 2–5	East Jonidan #53; 3–4	West Jonidan #79; 4–3	West Jonidan #51; 3–4	East Jonidan #78; 4–3	East Jonidan #52; 2–5
2019	East Jonidan #86; 4–3	East Jonidan #56; 0–7	West Jonokuchi #4; 5–2	West Jonidan #61; 1–6	East Jonidan #104; 2–5	West Jonokuchi #5; 4–3
2020	West Jonidan #75; 2–5	West Jonidan #99; 4–3	West Jonidan #68; Tournament Cancelled; 0–0–0	West Jonidan #68; 2–5	East Jonidan #84; 3–4	East Jonidan #101; 1–6
2021	East Jonokuchi #9; 4–3	West Jonidan #77; 2–5	West Jonidan #94; 3–4	East Jonidan #100; 3–4	West Jonidan #101; 4–3	West Jonidan #59; 1–6
2022	West Jonidan #89; Retired; 2–5	x	x	x	x	x
Record given as wins–losses–absences Top division champion Top division runner-up Retired Lower divisions Non-participation Sanshō key: F=Fighting spirit; O=Outstanding performance; T=Technique Also shown: ★=Kinboshi; P=Playoff(s); Divisions: Makuuchi — Jūryō — Makushita — Sandanme — Jonidan — Jonokuchi Makuuchi ranks: Yokozuna — Ōzeki — Sekiwake — Komusubi — Maegashira

== See also ==
- Glossary of sumo terms
- List of past sumo wrestlers
