= Miyagino =

Miyagino may refer to:

- Miyagino-ku, Sendai
- Miyagino Nishikinosuke, a sumo wrestler
- Miyagino stable, a sumo stable or heya
- 4539 Miyagino, an asteroid
