= Meisei Chikara =

Japanese sumo wrestler

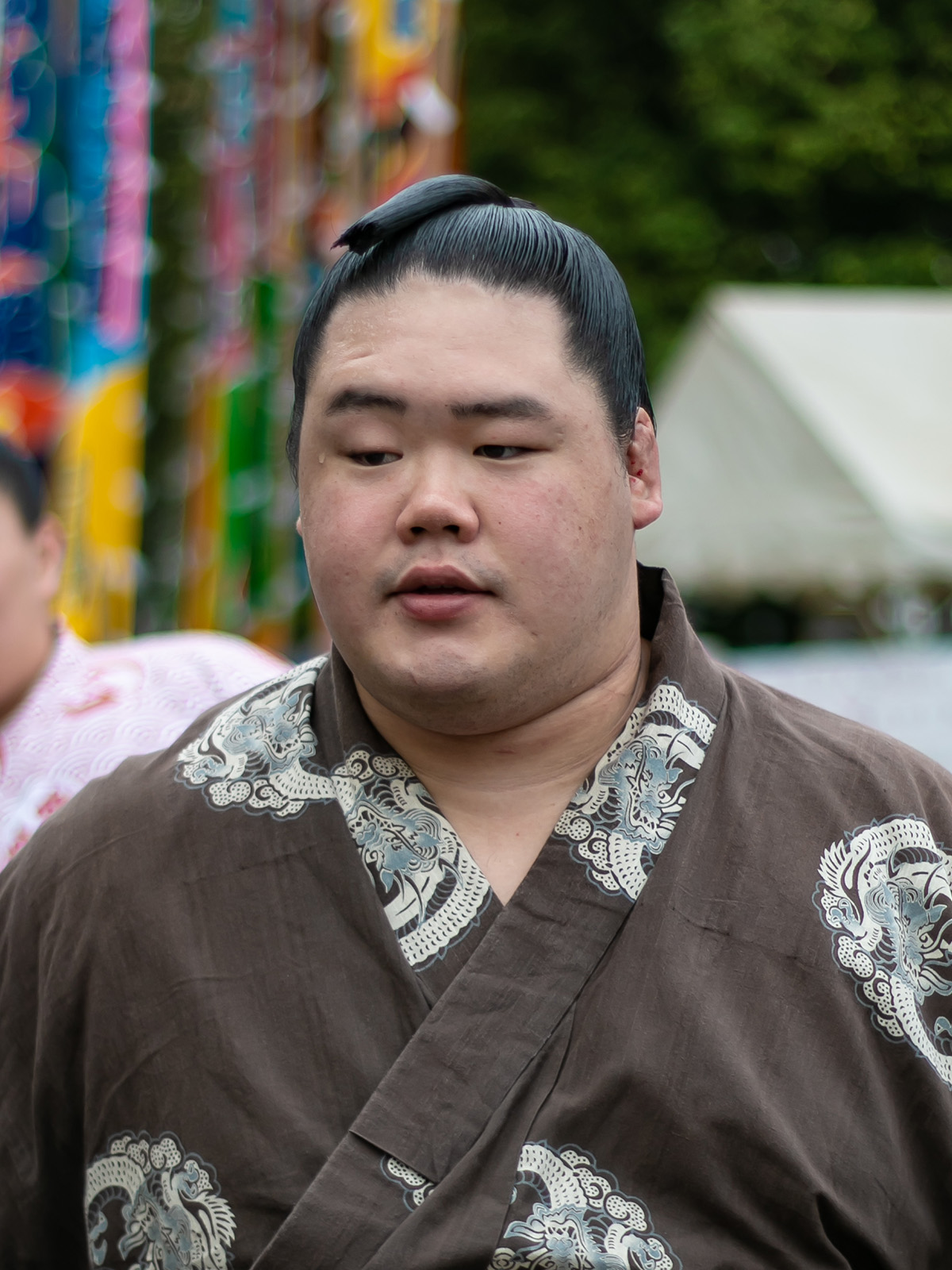
- Meisei in May 2019

Personal information
- Native name: 明生 力
- Born: Meisei Kawabata; July 24, 1995 (age 31) Setouchi, Kagoshima, Japan
- Height: 1.80 m (5 ft 11 in)
- Weight: 155 kg (342 lb; 24.4 st)

Sport
- Sport: Sumo
- Rank: see below
- Heya: Tatsunami
- Debut: May 2011
- Highest rank: Sekiwake (September, 2021)
- Championships: 1 (Jūryo)
- Special Prizes: 1 (Outstanding Performance); 1 (Fighting Spirit)
- Gold Stars: 2 (Terunofuji)
- Updated on 13 March 2024

Meisei Chikara (Japanese: 明生 力; born Meisei Kawabata (川畑 明生, Kawabata Meisei) on July 24, 1995) is a Japanese professional sumo wrestler from Setouchi, Kagoshima. He debuted in sumo wrestling in July 2011 and made his makuuchi debut in July 2018. His highest rank has been sekiwake. He wrestles for Tatsunami stable. Unusually for a top-class sumo wrestler, he uses his given name as his shikona.

== Background ==
Meisei was born in Setouchi, a town on Amami Ōshima, one of the Ryukyu Islands. He began sumo at the age of five and was strongly encouraged by his father and other family members. When his elementary school closed their sumo programme he joined a sumo club in a neighboring town and in sixth grade he won the All-Japan Primary School Sumo Tournament. He moved to the Kamogawa Junior High School and competed in national championships but failed to win any further championships. Although he considered attending High School he took his father's advice and left education at the age of 15 to pursue a career in professional sumo.

== Career ==
=== Early career ===
In 2011 Meisei joined the Tatsunami stable, bringing him under the tutelage of the former komusubi Asahiyutaka. Unlike most new wrestlers who begin their careers under their family names he took his given name as his shikona surname. Shortly before his sixteenth birthday he began his professional career in July 2011 and recorded four wins in seven bouts in the jonokuchi division to secure promotion to jonidan. A 5–2 result in November saw him promoted to the fourth sandanme division but in January 2012 he won only two matches and returned to jonidan after posting his first make-koshi (losing record). He returned to sandanme after a 6–1 record in March 2012 and a run of kachi-koshi (winning records) saw him promoted to makushita (third division) in January 2013. After moving up and down between sandanme and makushita several times he established himself in the higher division and began a steady climb through the ranks. In September 2016 a 4–3 result at the rank of makushita 3 saw him promoted to the second jūryō division for the first time. He returned to makushita after recording a 5–10 record in November but was promoted back to jūryō after two consecutive kachi-koshi. A series of solid results saw him rise to the top of the second division and in May 2018 a 10–5 record at jūryō saw him promoted to the makuuchi division.

=== Makuuchi career ===
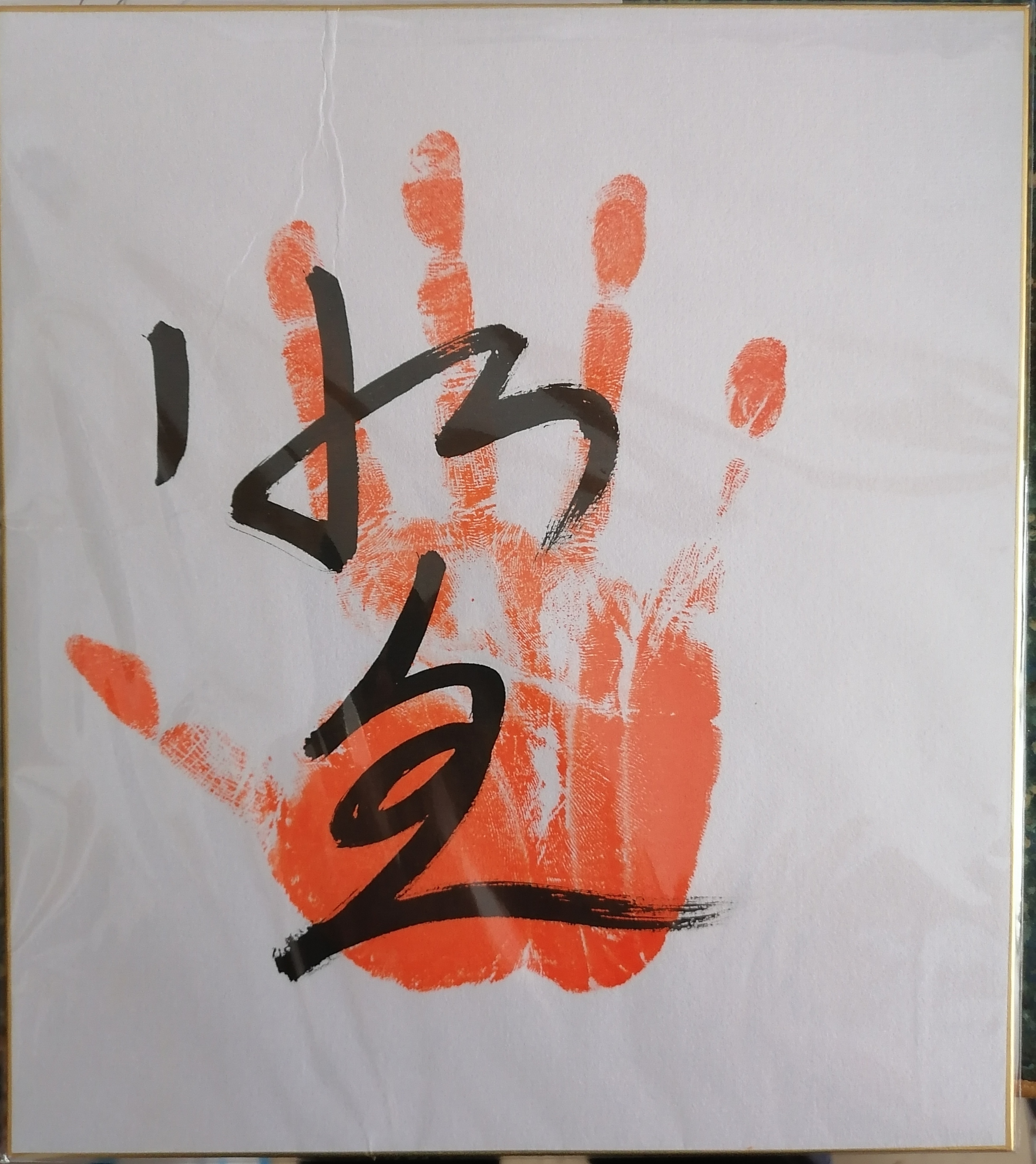
Original tegata (handprint and signature ) of sumo wrestler Meisei

In his first tournament in the top division Meisei was assigned the rank of maegashira 16. His kesho-mawashi, which featured the sun rising from the sea was embroidered by Miyuki Tanaka whose previous clients had included Chiyonofuji. He recorded six wins including victories over Hokutofuji and Chiyomaru but was relegated back to juryo. Nine wins at juryo 2 saw him return to the top division in November 2018 when he posted a 9–6 record including wins over Chiyomaru and Ōnoshō. In January he reached a score of 6–7 after 13 days but reached his kachi-koshi by beating Yoshikaze and Onosho in his last two bouts. Competing a career high of maegashira 11 in March 2019 he won nine of his fourteen bouts highlighted by an uwatedashinage win over the former ōzeki Kotoshogiku on day 13. In the following tournament, at another career high rank of maegashira 7 he lost his first three bouts but won ten of his remaining twelve matches including a victory over Tochinoshin. He reached maegashira 2 in November 2019.

On December 28 during training at his stable he injured his left upper arm muscle. He still entered the January 2020 tournament but withdrew on Day 8 with only one win. He failed to make kachi-koshi in March 2020 at the rank of maegashira 17, and secured his demotion to jūryō. In July 2020, he won the jūryō championship following a six-man playoff, ensuring his return to makuuchi.

After several solid performances saw him rise to maegashira 3 by March 2021, he produced a 10–5 record to win his first Fighting Spirit prize. In July 2021 he made his sanyaku debut at the rank of komusubi. He was the first wrestler from Tatsunami stable to reach that rank since Tomonohana in 1994. The following tournament he was promoted to sekiwake, the first from Tatsunami since Kitao in 1985. He earned his first win over a yokozuna on Day 12 of the September tournament when he defeated Terunofuji, although as he was not ranked as a maegashira he did not get a kinboshi. He finished the November 2021 tournament with a 7–8 record.

In the January 2022 banzuke he was demoted from sekiwake back to komusubi. In the New Year tournament he posted a 5–10 record. This led to his demotion to the rank of maegashira 3 in the following rankings. At the March tournament he had a 1–14 record. He was then ranked maegashira 13 for the May tournament. He then posted winning records in each of the four remaining tournaments of 2022.

In the first banzuke of 2023 he was promoted back to the rank of komusubi. However, at the January 2023 tournament his kachi-koshi streak was ended on day 12 after a loss to Sadanoumi. He finished the tournament with a 5–10 record. On the ninth day of the 2023 summer tournament, Meisei achieved kachi-koshi and won his first kinboshi by dealing yokozuna Terunofuji his only loss in this tournament. Meisei would lose all his remaining matches and end up with an 8–7 record. Nevertheless, he was awarded the Outstanding Performance prize because of his win over Terunofuji.

During the March 2024 tournament, Meisei, then ranked at West Maegashira 2 wrestlers, defeated Yokozuna Terunofuji to record his second kinboshi against him.

Meisei withdrew ahead of the November 2025 tournament, with his medical certificate revealing that he underwent surgery the previous month for a disc herniation. Stablemaster Tatsunami (former sekiwake Asahiyutaka) said that Meisei underwent surgery due to worsening back pain. He left open the possibility that Meisei could join the tournament midway, adding: "We won't push him too hard." It was later reported that Meisei would enter the tournament on Day 10.

== Fighting style ==
Meisei has shown a preference for yotsu techniques which involve grasping his opponent's mawashi or belt and favors the hidari-yotsu, or left-hand inside grip. His most common kimarite or winning move is yorikiri, the force-out.

== Personal life ==
On 8 January 2026, Meisei announced that he had married a younger woman in February 2025. Their wedding reception was held on 21 February 2026 with about 700 people in attendance. It was reported that Meisei proposed to the woman, named Konatsu, on Christmas Day in 2024 after about a year and a half of dating. Few other details about the wife were revealed, and photos of the woman were not shown to the press.

== Career record ==
Meisei Chikara
Year	January Hatsu basho, Tokyo	March Haru basho, Osaka	May Natsu basho, Tokyo	July Nagoya basho, Nagoya	September Aki basho, Tokyo	November Kyūshū basho, Fukuoka
2011	x	Tournament Cancelled; Match fixing investigation 0–0–0	(Maezumō)	West Jonokuchi #2; 4–3	East Jonidan #73; 5–2	East Jonidan #31; 5–2
2012	West Sandanme #96; 2–5	East Jonidan #31; 6–1	West Sandanme #67; 5–2	West Sandanme #35; 4–3	West Sandanme #20; 4–3	East Sandanme #10; 4–3
2013	West Makushita #59; 4–3	East Makushita #51; 3–4	East Sandanme #9; 4–3	West Makushita #59; 3–4	West Sandanme #11; 4–3	West Makushita #60; 3–4
2014	East Sandanme #8; 4–3	West Makushita #58; 3–4	East Sandanme #14; 6–1	East Makushita #38; 6–1	East Makushita #16; 4–3	West Makushita #13; 3–4
2015	West Makushita #18; 5–2	East Makushita #11; 4–3	West Makushita #8; 4–3	East Makushita #7; 2–5	West Makushita #19; 5–2	East Makushita #9; 3–4
2016	West Makushita #17; 3–4	West Makushita #23; 5–2	West Makushita #12; 5–2	East Makushita #5; 4–3	East Makushita #3; 4–3	West Jūryō #14; 5–10
2017	East Makushita #6; 4–3	West Makushita #3; 5–2	East Jūryō #14; 9–6	West Jūryō #11; 9–6	West Jūryō #8; 9–6	East Jūryō #4; 7–8
2018	West Jūryō #4; 8–7	East Jūryō #3; 7–8	East Jūryō #4; 10–5	West Maegashira #16; 6–9	East Jūryō #2; 9–6	West Maegashira #15; 9–6
2019	West Maegashira #12; 8–7	West Maegashira #11; 9–6	West Maegashira #7; 10–5	East Maegashira #4; 4–11	West Maegashira #10; 10–5	West Maegashira #2; 6–9
2020	East Maegashira #5; 1–7–7	East Maegashira #17; 7–8	East Jūryō #1; Tournament Cancelled; State of Emergency; 0–0–0	East Jūryō #1; 10–5–PPP; Champion	East Maegashira #13; 9–6	West Maegashira #10; 9–6
2021	East Maegashira #7; 8–7	East Maegashira #3; 10–5; F	East Maegashira #2; 8–7	West Komusubi #1; 8–7	West Sekiwake #1; 8–7	West Sekiwake #1; 7–8
2022	East Komusubi #1; 5–10	West Maegashira #3; 1–14	West Maegashira #13; 8–7	West Maegashira #10; 9–6	West Maegashira #2; 8–7	East Maegashira #2; 9–6
2023	East Komusubi #2; 5–10	West Maegashira #4; 5–10	East Maegashira #6; 8–7; O★	West Maegashira #3; 8–7	West Maegashira #1; 7–8	West Maegashira #2; 4–11
2024	West Maegashira #9; 9–6	West Maegashira #2; 6–9 ★	West Maegashira #5; 10–5	East Maegashira #1; 4–11	East Maegashira #6; 5–10	West Maegashira #11; 8–7
2025	West Maegashira #10; 6–9	West Maegashira #11; 9–6	East Maegashira #10; 9–6	West Maegashira #5; 3–12	East Maegashira #13; 5–10	East Maegashira #18; 1–5–9
2026	East Jūryō #8; 8–7	East Jūryō #7; 8–7	West Jūryō #6; 7–8	West Jūryō #7; 4–11	East Jūryō #13; 7–8	East Jūryō #13; 5–10
Record given as wins–losses–absences Top division champion Top division runner-up Retired Non-participation Jūryō Lower divisions Sanshō key: F=Fighting spirit; O=Outstanding performance; T=Technique Also shown: ★=Kinboshi; P=Playoff(s); Divisions: Makuuchi — Jūryō — Makushita — Sandanme — Jonidan — Jonokuchi Makuuchi ranks: Yokozuna — Ōzeki — Sekiwake — Komusubi — Maegashira

== See also ==
- Glossary of sumo terms
- List of active sumo wrestlers
- List of active gold star earners
- List of active special prize winners
- List of sumo second division champions
- List of sekiwake
