= Ichinoya =

Ichinoya may refer to:

- Ichinoya Mitsuru (一ノ矢 充) (born 1960), Japanese former sumo wrestler
- Ichinoya Tōtarō (一ノ矢 藤太郎) (1856–1923), Japanese sumo wrestler
