= Ōshima stable =

Defunct sumo stable

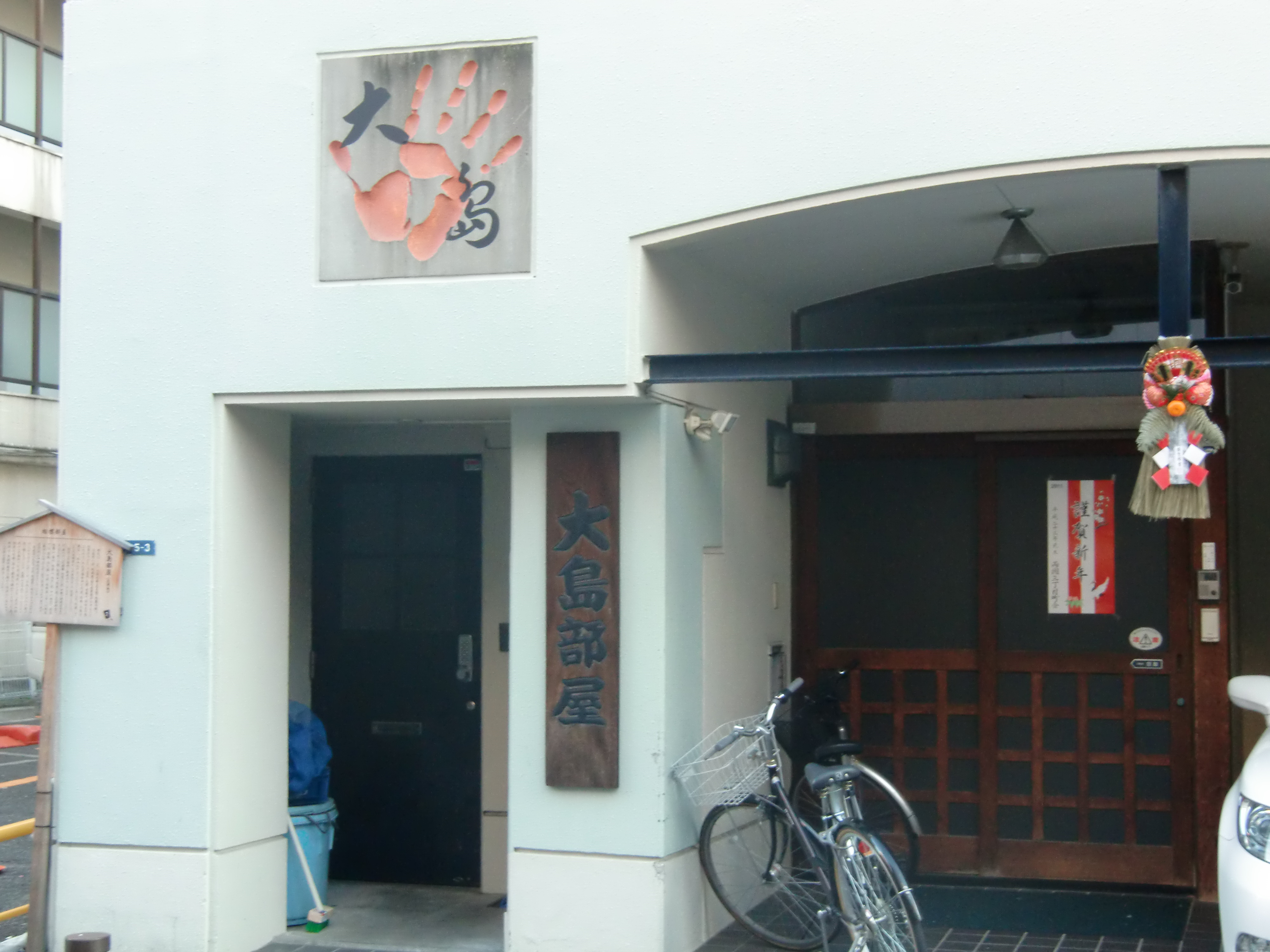

Ōshima stable (大島部屋, Ōshima-beya) (1980–2012) was a sumo stable of the Tatsunami group.

It was set up in 1980 by former ōzeki Asahikuni, who branched off from Tatsunami stable. The head of Tatsunami stable opposed the setting up of the new stable, and did not speak to Ōshima until Asahifuji was promoted to ōzeki in 1987. Ōshima produced ten sekitori, all of whom went on to reach the top makuuchi division.

Ōshima's senior wrestler in later years was the Mongolian-born veteran Kyokutenhō, who has Japanese citizenship and was seen as the successor to Ōshima. However, after Kyokutenhō indicated a desire to continue wrestling, the stable instead closed on 25 April 2012 when Ōshima reached the mandatory retirement age of 65, with its wrestlers (including Kyokutenhō) transferring to Tomozuna stable. Kyokutenhō took over Tomuzuna stable in 2017 and renamed it to Ōshima stable in 2022.

== Ring name conventions ==
Most wrestlers at this stable took ring names or shikona starting with the character 旭 meaning "sunrise", that can be read as either asahi or kyoku, in deference to their coach and the stable's owner, the former Asahikuni.

== Owner ==
1980–2012: 2nd Ōshima (ōzeki Asahikuni)

== Notable wrestlers ==
- Asahifuji (the 63rd Yokozuna)
- Kyokutenhō (sekiwake)
- Kyokudōzan (komusubi)
- Asahiyutaka (komusubi)
- Kyokushūzan (komusubi)
- Kyokunankai (maegashira)
- Kyokugōzan (maegashira)
- Kyokushūhō (maegashira)
- Kyokutaisei (maegashira)
- Asahisato (maegashira)
- Asahishō (maegashira)

== Referees ==
- Shozaburo Kimura (real name Saburo Hatakeyama) - san'yaku referee
- Hisayuki Kimura (Toshikazu Hata) - makuuchi referee

== Usher ==
- Akira (Toshiyuki Ichikawa) - makuuchi usher

== Location ==
3-5-3 Ryōgoku, Sumida, Tokyo, 10 minute walk from Ryōgoku Station

== See also ==
- List of sumo stables
- List of sumo elders
- List of active sumo wrestlers
- List of past sumo wrestlers
- List of years in sumo
- Glossary of sumo terms
