= Tatsunami stable =

Organization of sumo wrestlers

Coordinates: 35.9928°N 140.0361°E

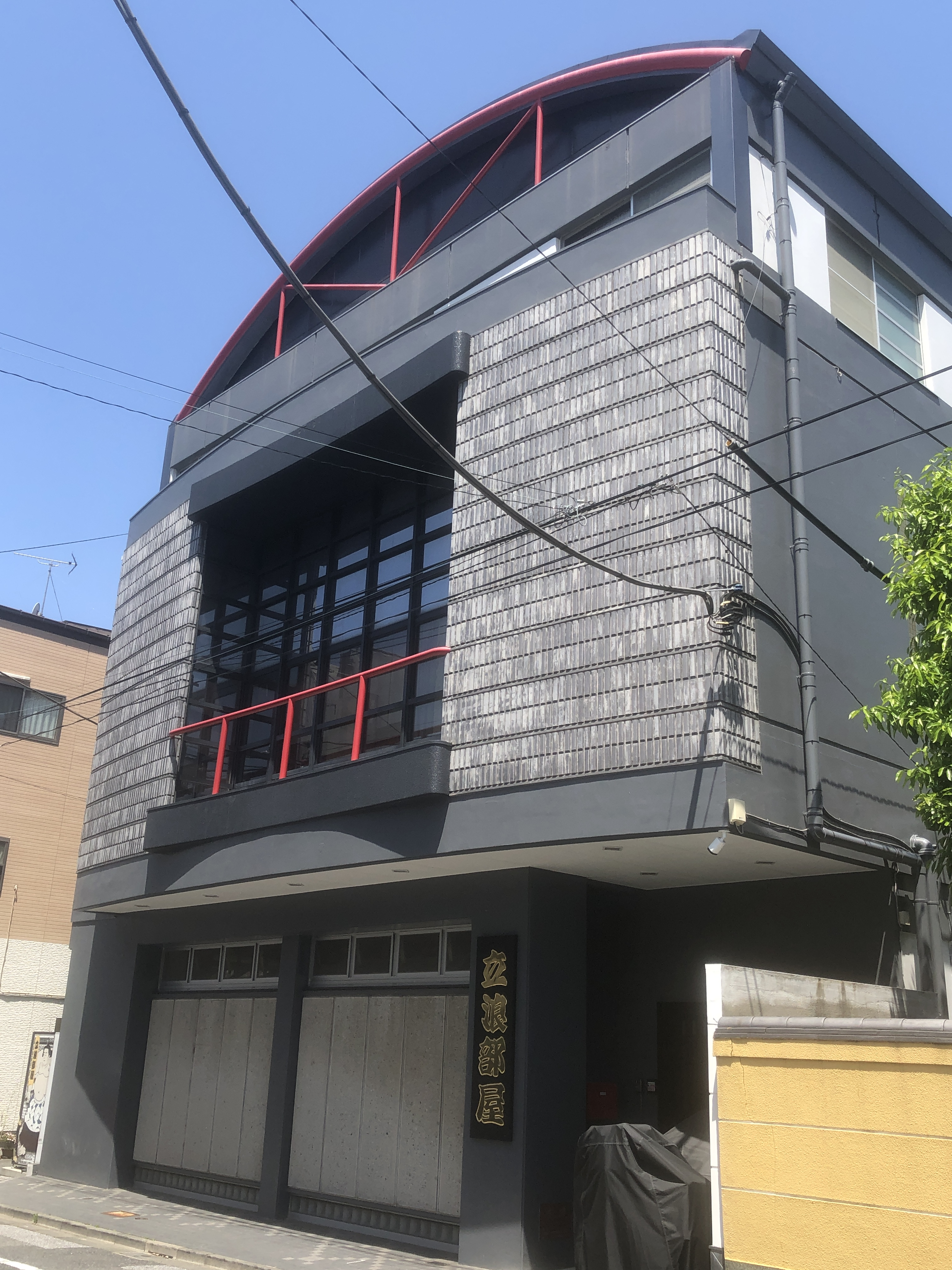

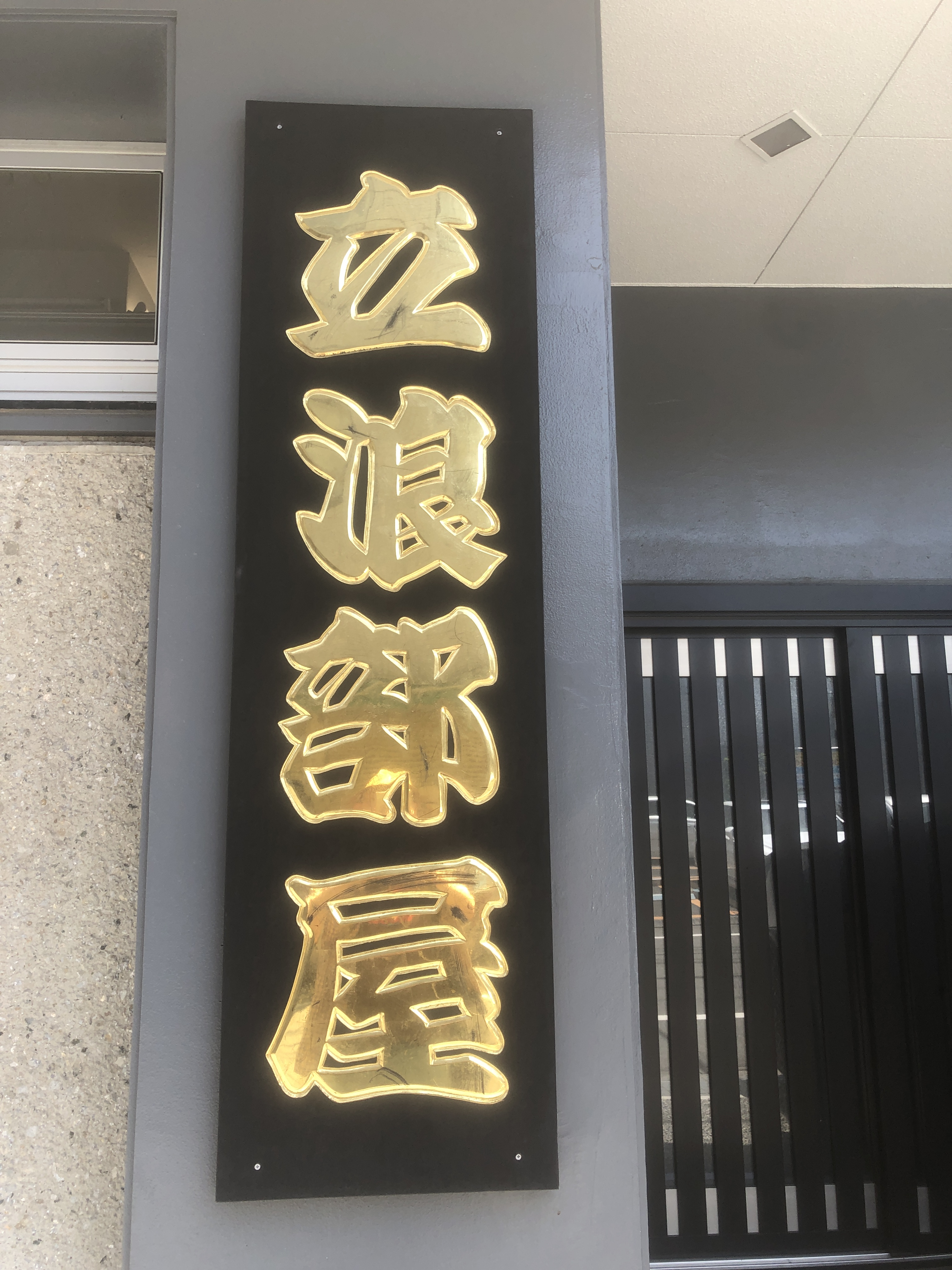

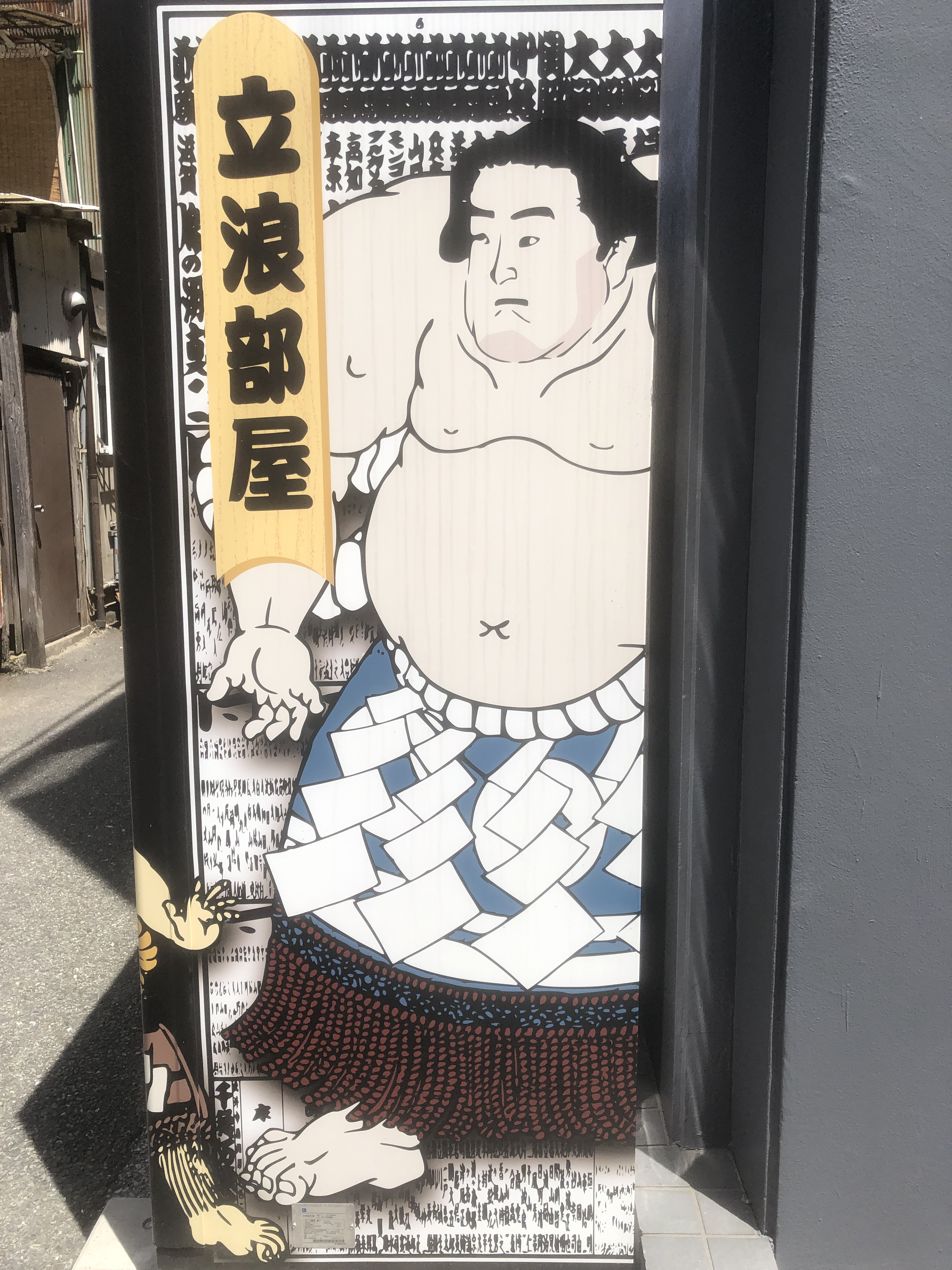
Vending machine next to stable

Tatsunami stable (立浪部屋, Tatsunami-beya) is a stable of sumo wrestlers, formerly the head of the Tatsunami ichimon or group of stables.

Previously situated in sumo's heartland of Ryōgoku nearby the Kokugikan stadium, it briefly moved in 2020 to Ibaraki Prefecture and alongside Shikihide stable was one of the furthest from Ryōgoku. In April 2021 the stable announced it was moving to Taitō, to occupy the premises previously used by Tokiwayama stable. It now resides in this large building with the practice dohyo on the ground floor.

As of May 2026, the stable has 16 active wrestlers.

== History ==
The stable is one of the most prestigious in sumo. It was founded in 1876 by Onigazaki, but the current incarnation dates from 1915. In the 1930s, led by former komusubi Midorishima (1878-1952), the stable produced the 35th yokozuna Futabayama, the 36th yokozuna Haguroyama and ōzeki Nayoroiwa, and ended the Dewanoumi stable's long period of dominance in sumo. Futabayama left to found his own stable in 1941. After Haguroyama married the previous stablemaster's daughter, he became the new head in December 1952 while still an active yokozuna. Haguroyama produced several strong wrestlers, including ōzeki Wakahaguro and sekiwake Annenyama. Annenyama in turn married Haguroyama's daughter and succeeded to the leadership of the stable upon his father-in-law's death in 1969.

Annenyama produced Asahikuni, an ōzeki in the 1970s, and sekiwake Kurohimeyama. Asahikuni retired in 1979 and left to found Ōshima stable in 1980, despite his stablemaster's opposition to the move. By the early 1980s the strength of the stable had declined and it was without any sekitori until Kitao was promoted to jūryō in 1984. Kitao became the 60th yokozuna Futahaguro in 1986, the first grand champion the Tatsunami ichimon had produced in decades, but at the end of 1987 Anneneyama and Futahaguro had a row which ended with the yokozuna kicking the elderly chairman of the stable's supporter group and pushing his stablemaster's wife as he stormed out. Futahaguro was forced to leave the Sumo Association as a result.

In the early 1990s the stable produced top division wrestlers such as komusubi Daishōhō and maegashira Daishōyama, both amateur champions from Nihon University. Asahiyutaka of Ōshima stable married Annenyama's daughter in 1995 and became the new head of Tatsunami when Annenyama reached the mandatory retirement age of 65 in 1999. However the two had a falling out and after Asahiyutaka was divorced, Annenyama sued him for 175 million yen as Asahiyutaka had obtained the Tatsunami elder name for free instead of having to pay the market value, although the award was reversed. Annenyama also attempted to evict Asahiyutaka from the stable premises.

In April 2011, the stable's last sekitori at that point, the Mongolian wrestler Mōkonami, was forced to retire after being found guilty of match-fixing. Tatsunami stayed five and a half years without any wrestlers in the top two professional divisions, before Meisei was finally promoted to jūryō after the September 2016 tournament. Meisei made the top division in July 2018. Another notable member is Hanakaze, who holds the distinction of having the longest career in the centuries long history of sumo, a career that began in 1986, one year before his current stablemaster.

The stable's success was reflected in its postwar status as the leading stable in its ichimon or group of stables, which was called Tatsunami-Isegahama ichimon until 2006, when it became simply Tatsunami ichimon (reflecting the decline of the old Isegahama stable under former ōzeki Kiyokuni's leadership). However, in 2012, due to the head coach voting against the ichimon's will in the Sumo Association's board elections, Tatsunami stable moved to the Takanohana ichimon. Tatsunami ichimon then renamed itself Isegahama ichimon in January 2013. Tatsunami stable went independent in 2018, but after the Sumo Association indicated that stables must belong to an ichimon, it aligned itself with the Dewanoumi group.

The stable's foreign recruit is Hōshōryū, the Mongolian nephew of former yokozuna Asashōryū, who joined the stable in November 2017 and made his first tournament appearance in January 2018. He became a sekitori in November 2019 and reached the top division in September 2020. He was promoted to komusubi in March 2022, elevated to sekiwake in September 2022, and was promoted to ōzeki after winning his first top-division championship in July 2023. Hōshōryū was promoted to yokozuna in January 2025. In November 2020, Akua became the fifth member of Tatsunami stable to reach the top division under the present stablemaster, following Ōhinode, Mōkonami, Meisei and Hōshōryū.

In July 2021 Meisei became the first Tatsunami stable wrestler to reach the komusubi rank since Tomonohana in 1994 and for the September 2021 tournament he became its first sekiwake since Kitao in 1985.

In February 2024, two of the stable's wrestlers received a letter of commendation from the Tokyo Fire Department for providing first aid to an 87-year-old man drowning after a cardiac arrest in the public baths.

Following the 2026 Kumamoto earthquake, the stable announced that the upcoming release of a fan book (the "Tatsunami Stable Fan Book 2026") would also serve to donate a portion of the proceeds to the communities affected by the disaster.

== People ==
=== Ring name conventions ===
Many wrestlers at this stable have taken ring names or shikona that end with the character 浪 (read: nami), which is the last character of the elder name associated with ownership of the stable. Examples include Kokuryūnami and Taranami.

=== Owners ===
- 1999–present: 7th Tatsunami (iin, komusubi Asahiyutaka, born 1968)
- 1969–1999: 6th Tatsunami (sekiwake Annenyama, 1934–2021)
- 1952–1969: 5th Tatsunami (36th yokozuna Haguroyama, 1914–1969)
- 1915–1952: 4th Tatsunami (komusubi Midorishima)

=== Notable active wrestlers ===
- Hōshōryū (74th yokozuna, born 1999)
- Meisei (best rank sekiwake, born 1995)
- Akua (best rank maegashira, born 1990)
- Kiryūkō (best rank jūryō, born 2002)
- Okaryu (best rank jūryō)

=== Notable former members ===
- Futabayama (35th yokozuna, 1912–1968)
- Haguroyama (36th yokozuna, 1914–1969)
- Futahaguro (60th yokozuna, 1963–2019)
- Nayoroiwa (ōzeki, 1914–1971)
- Wakahaguro (ōzeki, 1934–1969)
- Asahikuni (ōzeki, 1947–2024)
- Annenyama (sekiwake, 19342021)
- Kitanonada (sekiwake, 1923–2002)
- Tokitsuyama (sekiwake, 1925–1968)
- Kurohimeyama (sekiwake, 1948–2019)
- Mōkonami (maegashira 6, born 1984)
- Midorimine (makushita 13, 1948–2020)
- Hanakaze (sandanme 18, born 1970)
- 35th Kimura Shōnosuke (given name Jun'ichi Uchida - tate-gyōji)

=== Referees ===
- Kimura Senshin (jonokuchi gyōji, real name Seia Koga, born 2008)

=== Ushers ===
- Yūto (makushita yobidashi, real name Yūto Kawashima, born 1987)

=== Hairdresser ===
- Tokokei (fifth class tokoyama, born 2003)

== Location and access ==
1 Chome-16-5 Hashiba, Taito City, Tokyo 111-0023, Japan

== See also ==
- List of sumo stables
- List of active sumo wrestlers
- List of past sumo wrestlers
- Glossary of sumo terms
