= Asahikuni Masuo =

Japanese sumo wrestler (1947–2024)

Personal information
- Native name: 旭國 斗雄
- Born: Takeo Ōta; April 25, 1947 Hokkaidō, Japan
- Died: October 22, 2024 (aged 77)
- Height: 1.74 m (5 ft 9 in)
- Weight: 121 kg (267 lb)

Sport
- Sport: Sumo
- Retired: September, 1979
- Heya: Tatsunami
- Record: 635-479-72
- Debut: July, 1963
- Highest rank: Ōzeki (May, 1976)
- Elder name: Ōshima
- Championships: 1 (Jūryō); 1 (Makushita)
- Special Prizes: Fighting Spirit (1); Technique(6)
- Gold Stars: 2 (Kotozakura, Kitanofuji)
- Updated on June 2020

Asahikuni Masuo (Japanese: 旭國 斗雄; April 25, 1947 – October 22, 2024), born Takeo Ōta (太田武雄, Ōta Takeo), was a Japanese sumo wrestler from Hokkaidō, Japan. His highest rank was ōzeki. After his retirement he set up Ōshima stable which he ran from 1980 until he left the Japan Sumo Association in 2012 upon reaching the age of 65.

== Career ==
Born in Aibetsu, Kamikawa District, Asahikuni made his professional debut in July 1963, joining Tatsunami stable. He reached the second highest jūryō division in March 1969 and the top makuuchi division just two tournaments after that. In 1970 he dropped to jūryō once again but he returned to the top division in 1972, reaching sekiwake in November.

At the beginning of 1976 Asahikuni put together two strong records of 12–3 and 13-2, finishing as runner-up in both tournaments, and this earned him promotion to the rank of ōzeki. It had taken him 77 tournaments from his professional debut to reach ōzeki, which at the time was the slowest ever. His best tournament result came in July 1977 when he lost just one bout, but he finished as runner-up to Kitanoumi who won with a perfect record. Asahikuni was never able to win a top division championship, this being his fourth and final runner-up performance.

He retired in September 1979 after 21 tournaments as an ōzeki. His retirement was enforced, as he had broken his shoulder in a bout with Mienoumi. The two wrestlers had been friends as well as rivals, having made their professional debuts in the same month, and their friendship survived the incident.

== Fighting style ==
Asahikuni was an extremely skilful wrestler, earning the nickname "the PhD of sumo", such was his knowledge of a wide variety of techniques. He won the prestigious Ginō-shō, or Technique prize, on six occasions. He achieved this despite the fact that he suffered regularly from pancreatitis and was known even to commute to tournaments from hospital. He specialised in a left hand outside, right hand inside grip on his opponent's mawashi, migi-yotsu, from which he regularly won by shitatenage, or underarm throw. He was also one of very few wrestlers to use tottari, or arm pull.

== Retirement from sumo ==
Asahikuni stayed in the sumo world as an elder at Tatsunami stable under the name of Ōshima Oyakata. In 1980 he established Ōshima stable, despite strong opposition from his old stable boss Tatsunami, who did not want him to break away from the stable even though Asahikuni did not take any high ranking wrestlers with him. Ōshima stable eventually produced Asahifuji, and when he was promoted to ōzeki in 1987 Ōshima exchanged some words with his former stablemaster for the first time since he left Tatsunami stable seven years previously. Asahifuji went on to reach the yokozuna rank in 1990.

In 1992 Ōshima became the first stablemaster to recruit Mongolians, with six joining for the March 1992 tournament. Two of them, Kyokushūzan and Kyokutenhō, reached the top division, rising to komusubi and sekiwake respectively. In all Ōshima produced ten sekitori, including komusubi Kyokudōzan and Asahiyutaka. He also worked as a judge of tournament bouts and was on the Japan Sumo Association's board of directors until 2010 when he lost an election to Takanohana. Upon reaching the mandatory retirement age of 65 in April 2012 Ōshima stable was dissolved with its wrestlers moving to Tomozuna stable. Kyokutenhō, who had once been considered a future head of Ōshima stable, instead became head of Tomozuna stable in 2017.

== Personal life and death ==
Asahikuni had two sons, both of whom joined his stable, but neither reached the elite sekitori ranks. His elder son, Tomō, born in 1978, joined in 1994 and was known as Kyokuhoten. He retired in November 1999 after a long injury layoff, with a highest rank of sandanme 26. His younger son Kunihiro, born in 1979, made his debut in 1995 and fought under the similar ring name of Kyokushoten. He had a much longer and marginally more successful career, reaching a highest rank of makushita 46 before retiring in January 2011.

Asahikuni died on October 22, 2024, at the age of 77.

== Career record ==
Asahikuni Masuo
Year	January Hatsu basho, Tokyo	March Haru basho, Osaka	May Natsu basho, Tokyo	July Nagoya basho, Nagoya	September Aki basho, Tokyo	November Kyūshū basho, Fukuoka
1963	x	x	x	(Maezumo)	West Jonokuchi #11; 6–1	West Jonidan #11; 6–1
1964	West Sandanme #84; 5–2	West Sandanme #53; 5–2	East Sandanme #25; 5–2	East Makushita #93; 4–3	West Makushita #81; 2–5	West Sandanme #6; 4–3
1965	East Makushita #90; 4–3	West Makushita #78; 3–4	West Makushita #87; 1–6	East Sandanme #21; 4–3	East Sandanme #9; 5–2	East Makushita #79; 5–2
1966	East Makushita #66; 4–3	East Makushita #60; 4–3	East Makushita #55; 2–5	West Makushita #73; 4–3	West Makushita #63; 5–2	West Makushita #44; 3–4
1967	West Makushita #50; 4–3	West Makushita #39; 7–0; Champion	East Makushita #11; 3–4	West Makushita #13; 2–5	East Makushita #26; 5–2	West Makushita #12; 4–3
1968	West Makushita #9; 3–4	West Makushita #11; 4–3	East Makushita #8; 5–2	East Makushita #2; 2–5	East Makushita #11; 4–3	East Makushita #6; 5–2
1969	West Makushita #3; 5–2	West Jūryō #13; 10–5	West Jūryō #5; 11–4	East Maegashira #11; 7–8	West Maegashira #12; 8–7	East Maegashira #6; 6–9
1970	West Maegashira #11; 8–7	East Maegashira #9; 6–7–2	East Maegashira #13; 9–6	West Maegashira #6; 4–11	East Jūryō #1; 8–7	West Jūryō #1; Sat out due to injury 0–0–15
1971	East Jūryō #10; 8–7	East Jūryō #9; 7–8	West Jūryō #10; 9–6	East Jūryō #5; 8–7	East Jūryō #3; 12–3; Champion	East Maegashira #10; 8–7
1972	West Maegashira #4; 0–1–14	East Jūryō #1; 10–5	West Maegashira #10; 8–7	West Maegashira #7; 9–6	West Maegashira #3; 10–5; T	West Sekiwake #1; 4–11
1973	East Maegashira #5; 8–7	West Maegashira #1; 8–7	East Maegashira #1; 6–9	West Maegashira #3; 8–7	West Sekiwake #1; 0–3–12	East Maegashira #8; 9–6
1974	West Maegashira #2; 4–11	West Maegashira #9; 11–4; T	West Maegashira #1; 9–6 ★	East Maegashira #1; 8–7 ★	West Komusubi #1; 7–8	West Maegashira #1; 7–8
1975	West Maegashira #2; 10–5	West Komusubi #1; 4–2–9	East Maegashira #4; 11–4; T	East Komusubi #1; 11–4; T	West Sekiwake #1; 9–6; T	West Sekiwake #1; 8–7
1976	East Sekiwake #1; 12–3; F	East Sekiwake #1; 13–2–P; T	East Ōzeki #1; 9–6	West Ōzeki #1; 9–6	West Ōzeki #1; 10–5	West Ōzeki #1; 10–5
1977	East Ōzeki #1; 0–3–12	East Ōzeki #3; 9–6	East Ōzeki #2; 9–6	East Ōzeki #2; 9–6	West Ōzeki #1; 14–1	East Ōzeki #1; 8–7
1978	West Ōzeki #2; 10–5	East Ōzeki #2; 10–5	West Ōzeki #1; 8–7	West Ōzeki #1; 9–6	West Ōzeki #1; 3–12	West Ōzeki #2; 9–6
1979	West Ōzeki #2; 9–6	West Ōzeki #2; 3–6–6	West Ōzeki #2; 8–7	West Ōzeki #2; 8–7	West Ōzeki #1; Retired; 4–4	x
Record given as wins–losses–absences Top division champion Top division runner-up Retired Lower divisions Non-participation Sanshō key: F=Fighting spirit; O=Outstanding performance; T=Technique Also shown: ★=Kinboshi; P=Playoff(s); Divisions: Makuuchi — Jūryō — Makushita — Sandanme — Jonidan — Jonokuchi Makuuchi ranks: Yokozuna — Ōzeki — Sekiwake — Komusubi — Maegashira

== See also ==
- Glossary of sumo terms
- List of sumo tournament top division runners-up
- List of sumo tournament second division champions
- List of past sumo wrestlers
- List of ōzeki
