= Kyokugōzan Kazuyasu =

Sumo wrestler

Personal information
- Native name: 旭豪山和泰
- Born: Taizan Kimura; 18 September 1968 (age 58) Ichikawa, Chiba, Japan
- Height: 1.81 m (5 ft 11 1/2 in)
- Weight: 169 kg (373 lb)

Sport
- Sport: Sumo
- Retired: September, 1996
- Heya: Ōshima
- Record: 426-428-7
- Debut: March, 1984
- Highest rank: Maegashira 9 (July, 1990)
- Championships: 1 (Jūryō)
- Updated on Sep. 2012

Kyokugōzan Kazuyasu (born 18 September 1968 as Taizan Kimura) is a former sumo wrestler from Ichikawa, Chiba, Japan. He made his professional debut in March 1984, and reached the top division in November 1989. His highest rank was maegashira 9. He left the sumo world upon retirement in September 1996.

== Career record ==
Kyokugōzan Kazuyasu
Year	January Hatsu basho, Tokyo	March Haru basho, Osaka	May Natsu basho, Tokyo	July Nagoya basho, Nagoya	September Aki basho, Tokyo	November Kyūshū basho, Fukuoka
1984	x	(Maezumo)	East Jonokuchi #18; 3–4	West Jonokuchi #23; 6–1	East Jonidan #81; 5–2	West Jonidan #41; 3–4
1985	West Jonidan #56; 3–4	East Jonidan #72; 4–3	West Jonidan #46; 4–3	West Jonidan #21; 5–2	West Sandanme #85; 5–2	East Sandanme #55; 3–4
1986	West Sandanme #71; 5–2	East Sandanme #35; 4–3	East Sandanme #17; 5–2	West Makushita #49; 3–4	East Sandanme #1; 2–5	West Sandanme #24; 5–2
1987	West Makushita #60; 4–3	West Makushita #46; 5–2	East Makushita #28; 3–4	East Makushita #40; 4–3	West Makushita #28; 4–3	West Makushita #17; 4–3
1988	West Makushita #11; 3–4	West Makushita #17; 5–2	West Makushita #9; 4–3	West Makushita #6; 5–2	West Makushita #1; 5–2	East Jūryō #12; 9–6
1989	East Jūryō #6; 8–7	East Jūryō #4; 5–10	West Jūryō #11; 10–5–P	West Jūryō #4; 8–7	West Jūryō #3; 9–6	West Maegashira #14; 4–11
1990	West Jūryō #4; 10–5	West Jūryō #1; 9–6	East Maegashira #13; 8–7	East Maegashira #9; 6–9	West Maegashira #13; 1–14	West Jūryō #10; 9–6
1991	East Jūryō #5; 6–9	West Jūryō #9; 11–4; Champion	West Jūryō #2; 7–8	East Jūryō #3; 8–7	East Maegashira #16; 4–11	East Jūryō #5; 7–8
1992	East Jūryō #7; 6–9	East Jūryō #10; 7–8	East Jūryō #12; 9–6	West Jūryō #6; 8–7	East Jūryō #4; 8–7	East Jūryō #1; 8–7
1993	West Maegashira #16; 4–11	West Jūryō #7; 9–6	West Jūryō #4; 8–7	West Jūryō #3; 7–8	West Jūryō #6; 8–7	East Jūryō #5; 8–7
1994	East Jūryō #4; 8–7	West Jūryō #3; 8–7	West Jūryō #2; 6–9	West Jūryō #6; 8–7	East Jūryō #5; 8–7	West Jūryō #2; 8–7
1995	West Jūryō #1; 6–9	West Jūryō #4; 8–7	East Jūryō #3; 7–8	East Jūryō #5; 6–9	West Jūryō #10; 1–14	West Makushita #9; 4–3
1996	East Makushita #5; 2–5	East Makushita #20; 3–4	East Makushita #28; 0–7	East Sandanme #3; 3–4	West Sandanme #18; Retired; 0–0–7	x
Record given as wins–losses–absences Top division champion Top division runner-up Retired Lower divisions Non-participation Sanshō key: F=Fighting spirit; O=Outstanding performance; T=Technique Also shown: ★=Kinboshi; P=Playoff(s); Divisions: Makuuchi — Jūryō — Makushita — Sandanme — Jonidan — Jonokuchi Makuuchi ranks: Yokozuna — Ōzeki — Sekiwake — Komusubi — Maegashira

== See also ==
- Glossary of sumo terms
- List of past sumo wrestlers
- List of sumo tournament second division champions
