= Miyagino Nishikinosuke =

Japanese sumo wrestler

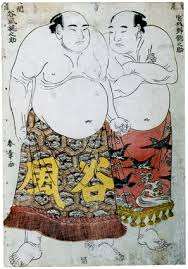
- Miyagino to the right, depicted next to his more well-known contemporary, Tanikaze

Personal information
- Native name: 宮城野 錦之助
- Born: Daihachi Koshima; 1744 Esashi, Iwate, Japan
- Died: July 18, 1798 (aged 54)
- Height: 1.82 m (5 ft 11 1/2 in)
- Weight: 116 kg (256 lb)

Sport
- Sport: Sumo
- Retired: March 1796
- Heya: Sanoyama
- Record: 61-30-86; 14draws-6holds-12no results
- Debut: October 1766
- Highest rank: Sekiwake (March 1786)
- Updated on May 2017

Miyagino Nishikinosuke (宮城野 錦之助, 1744 – July 18, 1798) was a Japanese sumo wrestler. His highest rank was sekiwake. He was an active top makuuchi division wrestler at the age of 52, which is the all-time recognized record.

== Career ==
His shikona was named after Miyagino because he worked under the Sendai Domain. He made his debut in October 1766. He was promoted to the top makuuchi division in March 1781. He was demoted to jūryō in November 1794, but returned to makuuchi in March 1796 at the age of 52. After that tournament, he retired. His relatively uninterrupted career lasted 30 years, a record broken only in 2016 by Hanakaze and Hokutōryū, who both made their debuts in 1986.

After retiring, he became a toshiyori (or sumo elder), but died only two years later. The modern Miyagino stable was named after him and he is regarded as the first Miyagino oyakata.

== Top Division Record ==
- The actual time the tournaments were held during the year in this period often varied.

Miyagino Nishikinosuke
-	Spring	Winter
1781	West Maegashira #1; 6–0–3; 1h	West Maegashira #3; 5–1; 1d 1h 2nr
1782	West Komusubi; 4–0–4; 1d 1h	West Komusubi; 2–1–4; 2d 1nr
1783	West Maegashira #1; 3–2–3; 1d 1nr	West Komusubi; 5–1–4
1784	West Komusubi; 2–1–7	West Komusubi; 4–1–3; 1d 1nr
1785	Not held	Not held
1786	West Sekiwake; 3–0–7	West Sekiwake; 4–2–3; 1d
1787	Called off due to bad harvest	Not enrolled
1788	West Maegashira #5; 1–1–6; 1d 1nr	Sat out
1789	West Maegashira #1; 2–5–1; 2nr	West Komusubi; 2–3–1; 1d 1h 2nr
1790	West Komusubi; 4–1–1; 3d	West Maegashira #1; 3–2–2; 1d 2h
1791	West Maegashira #1; 3–2–3; 1d 1nr	Sat out
1792	West Sekiwake; 5–1–3; 1nr	Sat out
1793	Not enrolled	Not enrolled
1794	West Maegashira #3; 2–3–5	West Jūryō #3; 1–1; 2d
1795	West Jūryō #3; 1–3; 1d	West Jūryō #1; 1–3; 1d
1796	West Maegashira #7; Retired; 1–3–6	x
Record given as win-loss-absent Top Division Champion Retired Lower Divisions Key: d=Draw(s) (引分); h=Hold(s) (預り); nr=no result recorded Divisions: Makuuchi — Jūryō — Makushita — Sandanme — Jonidan — Jonokuchi Makuuchi ranks: Yokozuna (not ranked as such on banzuke until 1890); Ōzeki — Sekiwake — Komusubi — Maegashira

== See also ==
- Glossary of sumo terms
- List of past sumo wrestlers
