= Ichinoya Mitsuru =

Japanese sumo wrestler

Personal information
- Native name: 一ノ矢 充
- Born: Tetsuhiro Matsuda; 28 December 1960 (age 65) Kagoshima, Japan
- Height: 1.65 m (5 ft 5 in)
- Weight: 98.5 kg (217 lb)
- Website: http://www2s.biglobe.ne.jp/~wakamatu/

Sport
- Sport: Sumo
- University team: Ryukyu University
- Retired: November, 2007
- Heya: Takasago
- Record: 484-518-6
- Debut: November, 1983
- Highest rank: Sandanme 6 (July, 1991)
- Championships: 2 (Jonidan)
- Updated on June 2020

Ichinoya Mitsuru (born 28 December 1960 as Tetsuhiro Matsuda) is a former sumo wrestler from Tokunoshima, Ōshima, Kagoshima Prefecture, Japan. His highest rank was sandanme 6. He is a rare example of a national university graduate joining professional sumo. Entering the Takasago stable at age 23, he wrestled until the age of 46, making him one of the oldest ever rikishi.

== Career ==
At 46 years of age, Ichinoya was the oldest man in professional sumo since the start of the Shōwa era in 1926. When he began his sumo career in November 1983 his stablemate, former yokozuna Asashōryū was just three years old. He was the oldest wrestler in sumo for 62 tournaments, from the retirement of Dairyū in July 1997 until his own retirement in November 2007.

Ichinoya was interested in sumo from a very young age. He grew up on Tokunoshima island, which was the birthplace of the 46th Yokozuna Asashio Tarō III. He studied physics at the University of the Ryukyus in Okinawa, and started up a sumo club there. Upon graduation he attempted to enter professional sumo but was turned away by a number of stables due to lack of height (at 166 cm he was below the minimum requirement of 173 cm). After help from Wakamatsu Oyakata (the former Fusanishiki) he moved into Wakamatsu stable and did chores there and worked on stretching exercises before making his official debut in the November 1983 tournament. The next tournament he found himself in a rare six-way playoff for the sixth division title, but ultimately lost to the two last rivals standing (tomoesen). In July 1989 he became the first graduate of a national university to win a yūshō or tournament championship when he took the jonidan division title.

In 1990 his stable master retired due to ill health and was replaced by the former Asashio Tarō IV. In 2002 Wakamatsu stable merged with Takasago stable. He never rose higher than the fourth sandanme division, but he was much admired simply for his longevity and his determination in fighting opponents more than twenty years his junior. At the tournament in May 2007, ranked at Jonidan 87, he fought back from 0-3 down to achieve a 4–3 score and kachi-koshi. In November 2007, having completed 1000 professional bouts, he announced that he was retiring after 24 years in sumo. He also announced his intention to marry.

Ichinoya remained as the general manager of Takasago stable, looking after its day-to-day running. He is also a keen computer enthusiast and keeps a regular blog on the heya's website.

In February 2008 Ichinoya had his retirement ceremony, or danpatsu-shiki, at a hotel in Tokyo, along with his wedding reception. Asashōryū was among the attendees.

Interviewed in 2020 upon the occasion of his successor as oldest wrestler since the Showa era, Hanakaze, turning 50, Ichinoya (now known as Tetsuhiro Matsuda again) argued that although older wrestlers may not contribute much to sumo in sporting terms, they were important to the successful running of stables and the hosting of the tournaments.

== Career record ==
Ichinoya Mitsuru
Year	January Hatsu basho, Tokyo	March Haru basho, Osaka	May Natsu basho, Tokyo	July Nagoya basho, Nagoya	September Aki basho, Tokyo	November Kyūshū basho, Fukuoka
1983	x	x	x	x	x	(Maezumo)
1984	West Jonokuchi #43; 6–1–PPPP	West Jonidan #89; 3–4	East Jonidan #111; 5–2	West Jonidan #68; 2–5	West Jonidan #60; 2–5	West Jonidan #90; 2–2–3
1985	East Jonidan #123; 6–1	East Jonidan #49; 2–5	East Jonidan #77; 4–3	West Jonidan #51; 3–4	East Jonidan #73; 4–3	East Jonidan #53; 4–3
1986	East Jonidan #30; 2–5	West Jonidan #61; 3–4	West Jonidan #82; 4–3	East Jonidan #43; 5–2	East Jonidan #7; 5–2	East Sandanme #68; 1–6
1987	West Jonidan #6; 2–5	East Jonidan #34; 1–6	West Jonidan #80; 6–1	East Jonidan #14; 4–3	West Sandanme #93; 3–4	West Jonidan #5; 2–5
1988	West Jonidan #34; 5–2	West Sandanme #97; 4–3	West Sandanme #73; 3–4	West Sandanme #90; 5–2	East Sandanme #57; 2–5	West Sandanme #86; 4–3
1989	East Sandanme #66; 3–4	East Sandanme #80; 2–5	West Jonidan #10; 3–4	East Jonidan #28; 7–0–P; Champion	West Sandanme #37; 3–4	West Sandanme #53; 3–4
1990	West Sandanme #74; 3–4	West Sandanme #97; 5–2	West Sandanme #55; 4–3	East Sandanme #37; 4–3	East Sandanme #22; 3–4	East Sandanme #35; 3–4
1991	East Sandanme #53; 3–4	East Sandanme #71; 4–3	West Sandanme #51; 6–1	East Sandanme #6; 1–6	West Sandanme #43; 3–4	West Sandanme #53; 1–6
1992	West Sandanme #89; 3–4	East Jonidan #7; 3–4	East Jonidan #31; 4–3	West Jonidan #6; 3–4	East Jonidan #27; 2–5	East Jonidan #59; 4–3
1993	East Jonidan #30; 7–0–P; Champion	East Sandanme #35; 2–5	East Sandanme #59; 3–4	East Sandanme #73; 4–3	West Sandanme #53; 1–6	East Sandanme #90; 3–4
1994	West Jonidan #6; 2–5	West Jonidan #42; 5–2	West Jonidan #4; 3–4	West Jonidan #19; 4–3	East Sandanme #100; 3–4	West Jonidan #19; 4–3
1995	West Sandanme #97; 3–4	West Jonidan #22; 2–5	West Jonidan #53; 6–1	East Sandanme #89; 1–6	West Jonidan #31; 3–4	West Jonidan #52; 2–5
1996	West Jonidan #89; 5–2	West Jonidan #42; 3–4	West Jonidan #68; 3–4	East Jonidan #94; 3–4	East Jonidan #116; 5–2	East Jonidan #67; 3–4
1997	East Jonidan #89; 4–3	East Jonidan #62; 4–3	West Jonidan #38; 4–3	West Jonidan #15; 3–4	West Jonidan #36; 3–4	East Jonidan #57; 3–4
1998	East Jonidan #76; 3–4	East Jonidan #94; 4–3	West Jonidan #73; 4–3	West Jonidan #48; 3–4	East Jonidan #66; 5–2	West Jonidan #23; 5–2
1999	West Sandanme #93; 3–4	West Jonidan #9; 3–4	West Jonidan #32; 3–4	West Jonidan #48; 3–4	West Jonidan #67; 3–4	East Jonidan #84; 4–3
2000	West Jonidan #59; 4–3	West Jonidan #34; 1–6	East Jonidan #65; 4–3	East Jonidan #41; 2–5	West Jonidan #71; 6–1	East Jonidan #1; 2–5
2001	East Jonidan #35; 2–5	East Jonidan #59; 4–3	East Jonidan #36; 4–3	West Jonidan #15; 3–4	West Jonidan #36; 1–6	West Jonidan #69; 2–5
2002	East Jonidan #98; 6–1	West Jonidan #20; 3–4	East Jonidan #43; 3–4	West Jonidan #57; 2–5	West Jonidan #87; 4–3	West Jonidan #60; 4–3
2003	West Jonidan #39; 3–4	East Jonidan #54; 4–3	West Jonidan #29; 2–5	East Jonidan #60; 5–2	West Jonidan #17; 3–4	East Jonidan #41; 3–4
2004	West Jonidan #62; 4–3	East Jonidan #38; 1–6	West Jonidan #77; 5–2	East Jonidan #32; 2–5	East Jonidan #61; 4–3	East Jonidan #39; 3–4
2005	West Jonidan #66; 4–3	West Jonidan #41; 2–5	West Jonidan #66; 5–2	East Jonidan #25; 2–5	West Jonidan #59; 3–4	East Jonidan #78; 2–5
2006	East Jonidan #108; 3–4	East Jonokuchi #2; 4–3	West Jonidan #89; 3–4	East Jonidan #111; 4–3	East Jonidan #84; 3–4	East Jonidan #102; 4–3
2007	East Jonidan #72; 4–3	West Jonidan #46; 1–6	East Jonidan #87; 4–3	East Jonidan #61; 3–1–3	East Jonidan #83; 3–4	East Jonidan #103; Retired; 4–3
Record given as wins–losses–absences Top division champion Top division runner-up Retired Lower divisions Non-participation Sanshō key: F=Fighting spirit; O=Outstanding performance; T=Technique Also shown: ★=Kinboshi; P=Playoff(s); Divisions: Makuuchi — Jūryō — Makushita — Sandanme — Jonidan — Jonokuchi Makuuchi ranks: Yokozuna — Ōzeki — Sekiwake — Komusubi — Maegashira

== See also ==
- Glossary of sumo terms
- List of past sumo wrestlers
