= Kōji Kitao =

Japanese professional wrestler and sumo wrestler (1963–2019)

- Born: 12 August 1963; Tsu, Mie, Japan
- Died: 10 February 2019 (aged 55); Japan
- Citizenship: Japan
- Professional wrestling career
- Ring name(s): Kitao; Kōji Kitao; Mitsuharu Kitao; Monster Machine
- Billed height: 2.01 m (6 ft 7 in)
- Billed weight: 160 kg (353 lb)
- Trained by: NJPW Dojo; Brad Rheingans; Masa Saito
- Debut: November 18, 1989
- Retired: October 11, 1998
- Martial arts career
- Other names: Mitsuharu
- Division: Super heavyweight
- Team: Bukō Dōjō

Mixed martial arts record
- Total: 3
- Wins: 1
- By knockout: 0
- By submission: 1
- By decision: 0
- Losses: 2
- By knockout: 2
- By submission: 0
- By decision: 0
- Draws: 0

Other information
- Mixed martial arts record from Sherdog

Kōji Kitao (Japanese: 北尾 光司; August 12, 1963 – February 10, 2019) was a Japanese sumo wrestler (rikishi), professional wrestler, and mixed martial artist.

As Futahaguro Kōji (双羽黒 光司) he was sumo's 60th yokozuna, and the only one in sumo history not to win a top division tournament championship. He was forced to leave sumo at the end of 1987 after a falling-out with his stable master Tatsunami, and became a professional wrestler in 1990, primarily for New Japan Pro-Wrestling (NJPW) and Super World of Sports (SWS).

He also had a short film career as an actor, portraying a sumo wrestler in Jean-Claude Van Damme's 1996 martial arts film The Quest.

== Sumo wrestling career ==
Futahaguro Kōji
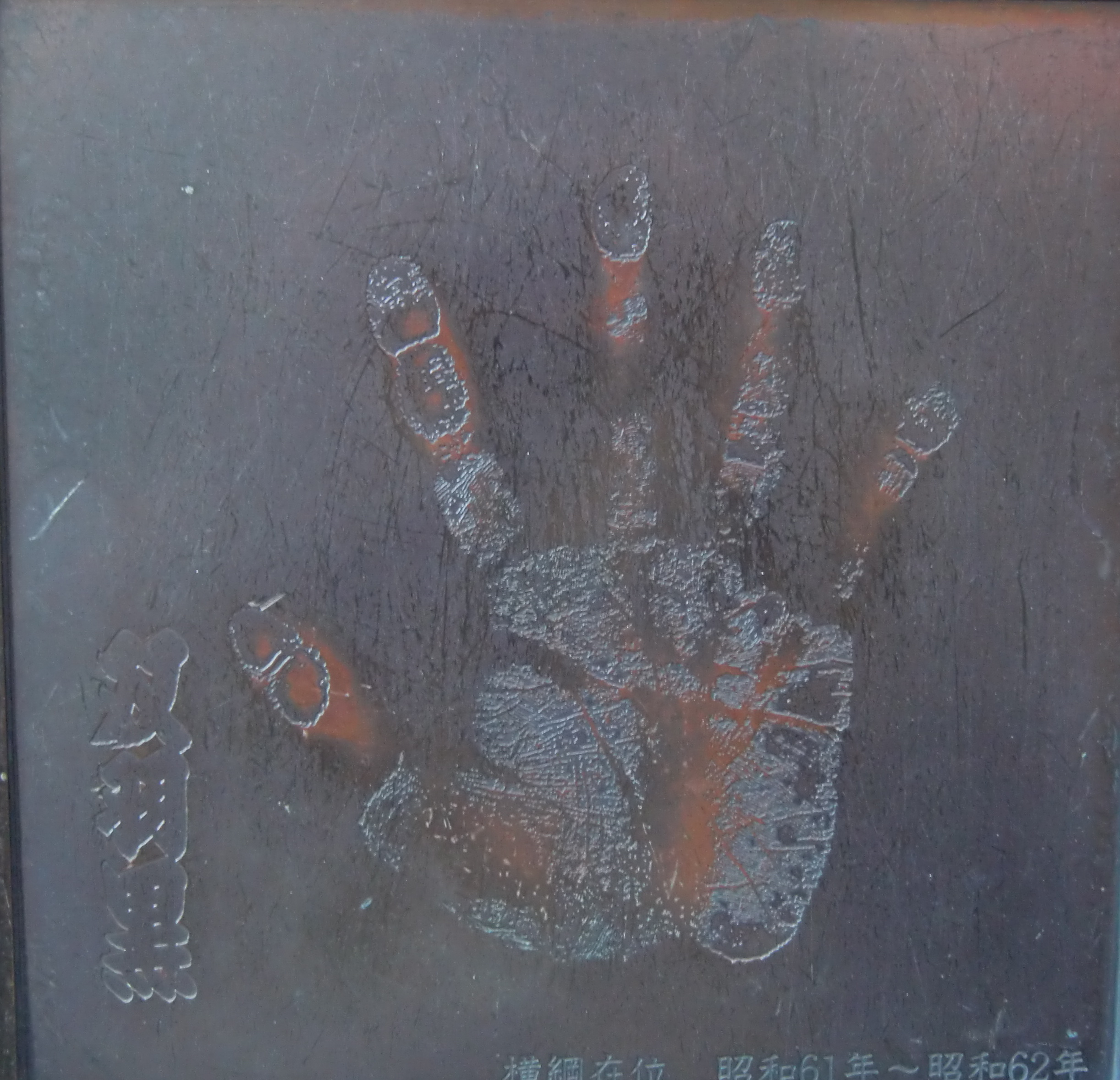

Personal information
- Native name: 双羽黒光司
- Height: 2.01 m (6 ft 7 in)
- Weight: 160 kg (353 lb; 25 st 3 lb)

Sport
- Sport: Sumo
- Retired: December, 1987
- Heya: Tatsunami
- Record: 348–184–24
- Debut: March, 1979
- Highest rank: Yokozuna (July, 1986)
- Championships: 1 (Jūryō); 1 (Jonokuchi)
- Special Prizes: Outstanding Performance (5); Technique (2)
- Gold Stars: 3 Kitanoumi; Chiyonofuji; Takanosato

=== Early career ===
Born in Tsu, Kitao made his professional sumo debut in March 1979 at the age of 15, joining Tatsunami stable. In March 1983 he ended up in a rare eight-way playoff for the third-division championship but failed to win the final bout. He reached the top makuuchi division in September 1984 after winning the championship in the jūryō division. In his second tournament in the top division he defeated yokozuna Kitanoumi and was awarded the Outstanding Performance prize and promotion to komusubi. He made his sekiwake debut in May 1985. In July 1985 he was back in the maegashira ranks but defeated two more yokozuna and was tournament runner-up with twelve wins. After finishing runner-up once more in November 1985 he was promoted to the second-highest rank of ōzeki. Kitao continued his rapid rise with his third runner-up performance in May 1986, followed by a 14–1 score in July, his only loss being to Hoshi. He defeated yokozuna Chiyonofuji on the final day to force a playoff with him, which Kitao lost.

=== Promotion to yokozuna ===
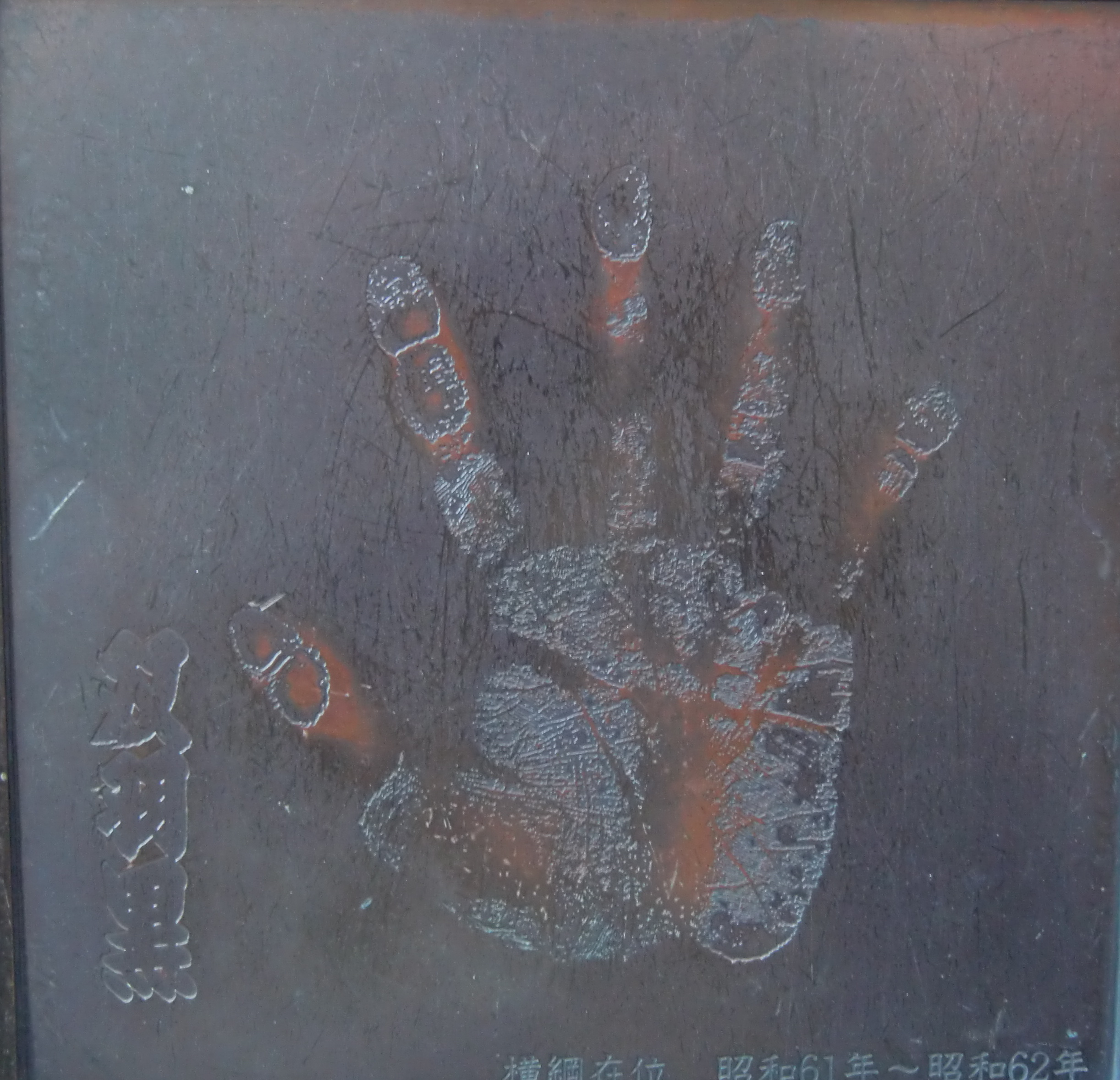
Futahaguro's handprint displayed on a sumo monument in Ryōgoku, Tokyo

After this result the Japan Sumo Association were faced with a difficult decision as there was only one yokozuna on the banzuke or rankings list, but five ōzeki, with a sixth wrestler – Hoshi (who would become yokozuna Hokutoumi), winner of the March 1986 tournament, already performing to ōzeki standards. The Association decided to promote Kitao to yokozuna and Hoshi to ōzeki. Kitao had won 36 bouts in the last three tournaments and been runner-up in the last two, so the de facto promotional standard of "two tournament championships or the equivalent" was interpreted rather loosely. He was just 22 years old and the first person to be promoted to yokozuna without any top division tournament titles since Terukuni in 1942. The Sumo Association insisted that Kitao could no longer compete under his family name at such an exalted rank so he adopted the shikona of Futahaguro, the name being formed from those of two highly successful former yokozuna from his stable, Futabayama and Haguroyama.

=== Downfall and expulsion ===
The decision to promote Futahaguro backfired and he proved to be a great embarrassment to the sumo establishment. His debut as a yokozuna in the September 1986 tournament saw him pull out on the seventh day with only three wins, and after two runner-up scores in November 1986 and January 1987, a series of mediocre performances followed. His best result as a yokozuna came in November 1987 when he was runner-up for the seventh time, with a 13–2 record (losing at the hands of maegashira and also future professional wrestler, Takanofuji). However, controversy was never far away from him. Several tsukebito (junior members) of his stable refused to serve under him following an incident on the 1987 winter tour in which he physically punished one of them and as a result of this, in December 1987 he had a heated argument with his stable boss, Tatsunami, and stormed out, allegedly striking Tatsunami's wife on the way (however this is almost certainly not true; see the § Sumo coaching role section). His stablemaster handed in Futahaguro's retirement papers without consulting him and the elders of the Sumo Association voted, without giving Futahaguro a hearing, to accept it. Futahaguro became the first yokozuna ever to be expelled from sumo this way. He had lasted just eight tournaments at yokozuna rank and had proved unable to win a championship.

=== Fighting style ===
Futahaguro preferred a migi-yotsu (left hand outside, right hand inside) grip on his opponent's mawashi. His favourite techniques were yori-kiri (force out) and sukui-nage (scoop throw).

== Sumo career record ==
Futahaguro Kōji
Year	January Hatsu basho, Tokyo	March Haru basho, Osaka	May Natsu basho, Tokyo	July Nagoya basho, Nagoya	September Aki basho, Tokyo	November Kyūshū basho, Fukuoka
1979	x	(Maezumō)	East Jonokuchi #5; 7–0–P; Champion	East Jonidan #21; 4–3	East Jonidan #2; 4–3	East Sandanme #78; 4–3
1980	West Sandanme #56; 4–3	West Sandanme #40; 2–5	West Sandanme #69; 4–3	East Sandanme #55; 4–3	East Sandanme #36; 5–2	West Sandanme #9; 4–3
1981	West Makushita #55; 4–3	West Makushita #40; 5–2	East Makushita #23; 4–3	West Makushita #15; 3–4	West Makushita #21; 4–3	West Makushita #13; 4–3
1982	East Makushita #9; 3–4	East Makushita #15; 0–1–6	East Makushita #50; 6–1–P	East Makushita #22; 5–2	West Makushita #11; 4–3	East Makushita #9; 3–4
1983	East Makushita #15; 4–3	East Makushita #12; 4–3	East Makushita #7; 4–3	East Makushita #3; 2–3–2	East Makushita #18; 6–1–PPP	West Makushita #4; 4–3
1984	East Jūryō #13; 8–7	East Jūryō #9; 10–5	East Jūryō #7; 10–5	West Jūryō #1; 12–3; Champion	East Maegashira #8; 8–7	West Maegashira #3; 8–7; O★
1985	West Komusubi #1; 10–5; T	East Komusubi #1; 10–5; O	West Sekiwake #1; 6–6–3	East Maegashira #1; 12–3; OT★★	West Sekiwake #1; 11–4; O	East Sekiwake #1; 12–3; O
1986	East Ōzeki #2; 10–5	West Ōzeki #1; 10–5	East Ōzeki #1; 12–3	East Ōzeki #1; 14–1–P	West Yokozuna #1; 3–4–8	West Yokozuna #1; 12–3
1987	West Yokozuna #1; 12–3–P	West Yokozuna #1; 7–3–5	West Yokozuna #1; 10–5	West Yokozuna #1; 8–7	East Yokozuna #2; 9–6	West Yokozuna #2; 13–2
1988	East Yokozuna #2; Retired –	x	x	x	x	x
Record given as wins–losses–absences Top division champion Top division runner-up Retired Non-participation Jūryō Lower divisions Sanshō key: F=Fighting spirit; O=Outstanding performance; T=Technique Also shown: ★=Kinboshi; P=Playoff(s); Divisions: Makuuchi — Jūryō — Makushita — Sandanme — Jonidan — Jonokuchi Makuuchi ranks: Yokozuna — Ōzeki — Sekiwake — Komusubi — Maegashira

== Professional wrestling career ==
Upon being dismissed by the Sumo Association, Kitao was linked with a move to America's National Football League, but instead turned to professional wrestling. To mollify the association, he dropped the shikona and reverted to his real name.

=== American Wrestling Association (1989) ===
To prepare for his debut in Japan, he debuted in the United States for Verne Gagne's American Wrestling Association on November 18, 1989, through Masa Saito's connections. To keep his identity a secret to the Japanese press, he wrestled under the masked persona, Monster Machine. He defeated Frankie DeFalco in his singles debut and also teamed with Saito defeating Jim Evans & Randy Fox.

=== New Japan Pro-Wrestling (1990) ===
Trained at the New Japan Pro-Wrestling (NJPW) dojo, he made his Japanese debut on February 10, 1990, at the NJPW/AJPW Supershow in the Tokyo Dome under his name Koji Kitao, and called himself "Warue", which translated to "bad man" in English, but later changed to "Thunder Storm", where he defeated Bam Bam Bigelow in a highly anticipated match. In the beginning, Kitao was liked by the audience thanks to his huge hype and image, however, in the weeks that followed, he started to get intensely negative reactions from the entire crowd of all arenas he wrestled, mostly because of his wrestling style being considered lazy and over the top, where oftentimes, the heels he fought got cheered instead. In the recurring weeks of that year, Kitao, alongside Masa Saito, Shinya Hashimoto, Kengo Kimura and Riki Choshu, had many encounters with Bigelow, "Dr. Death" Steve Williams and Big Van Vader, feuding with the latter, in which Kitao lost most of their matches. However later that July, he was fired for disrespectful conduct and racism towards Riki Choshu, who was of Zainichi Korean descent. His last match occurred on July 22, defeating Russian amateur wrestler Vladimir Berkovich in both men's last match.

=== Super World of Sports (1990–1991) ===
Upon joining SWS in November 1990, he joined the Revolution stable and teamed with fellow former sumo wrestler Genichiro Tenryu.

==== John Tenta shoot and firing ====
On April 1, 1991, Kitao was booked in a match against John "Earthquake" Tenta, another former sumotori, at a show jointly produced by SWS and the WWF at World Memorial Hall in Kobe. Kitao, who was booked to lose, broke kayfabe by no-selling Tenta's attacks, openly stalled the match, and legitimately attempted to gouge Tenta's eyes (which Tenta blocked). The match devolved into an awkward shoot fight, with Kitao attempting to throw a table at Tenta from outside the ring. After being shouted at by Tenta and with the crowd chanting Tenta's name, Kitao kicked the referee and was disqualified. Afterwards he picked up a microphone and in a shoot promo announced that wrestling was fake and Tenta could never really beat him, as other Japanese wrestlers attempted to restrain him.

According to Masakatsu Funaki and Yoshiaki Yatsu, Kitao rushed back to the locker room straight to the office of Hachiro Tanaka, SWS's manager, and was met by his wife, who called him out for his attitude. In response to her scolding, he threw a chair at her direction and left to get a taxi called in by KY Wakamatsu to be taken away safely, as wrestlers like Bret Hart, Randy Savage and in particular Hulk Hogan, who was scheduled to face Yatsu later in the night, were reportedly angry and were waiting for him at the locker rooms, while Akio Sato had to calm them all down. Days later, Kitao apologized to Tanaka and Tenryu, but due to the heavy demand of his expulsion, he was fired from SWS as a result, due to promotion officials being concerned that Kitao might further expose the business to national newspapers; The Great Kabuki was also eventually relegated and later fired as a SWS booker when officials discovered he had advised Tenta to stiff Kitao in an attempt to provoke his temper and get him expelled.

Bruce Prichard claimed on his podcast that Kitao was to blame for the encounter, as he was unwilling to sell for Tenta, whom he considered an inferior wrestler. Mike D'Orso suggested the two had a backstage rivalry dating back to their respective sumo careers.

=== World Wrestling Federation (1991) ===
Kitao made an appearance at the World Wrestling Federation's WrestleMania VII, with Genichiro Tenryu as they defeated Demolition.

=== Later career (1991–1998) ===
Kitao then wandered in martial arts and got a black belt in karate. In 1992 he returned to wrestling under his new martial arts persona by appearing in a UWF International event, defeating Kazuo Yamazaki. This enabled him to face UWF-i top star Nobuhiko Takada in a worked shoot wrestling match. Pre-match discussions over the outcome of the match led to an agreement being reached for a draw, but Takada saw an opportunity and double-crossed Kitao during the match, legitimately KO'ing him with a kick to the head. Takada had won, but the importance of the match was that Kitao was truly back in puroresu. Moreover, Kitao displayed a more respectful attitude than in the past, bowing to the crowd and shaking hands with Takada after the match.

In the following years he was recruited by Genichiro Tenryu for his Wrestle Association R promotion. Kitao also formed his own dojo and promotion called "Kitao Dojo", later changed to "Bukō Dōjō". Among the wrestlers that came out of the dojo were Masaaki Mochizuki, Yoshikazu Taru, and Takashi Okamura, who later became business partners of Último Dragón in his junior heavyweight ventures. In WAR, they competed as a stable led by Kitao, also called Bukō Dōjō.

On May 5, 1995, Kitao appeared in New Japan Pro-Wrestling to reconcile with Riki Choshu, and wrestled a match alongside Antonio Inoki against Choshu and Tenryu. Kitao participated in some Martial Arts Festivals arranged by Inoki, beating foreign wrestlers like Crusher Kline, Glen Jacobs, and Mabel.

In 1997, he won his only title, the WAR World Six-Man Tag Team Championship, with Mochizuki and WAR rookie Nobukazu Hirai in October 1997. They retained it for a year, dropping it in 1998 against Koki Kitahara, Lance Storm and Nobutaka Araya. Koji retired from pro wrestling in October 1998, celebrating his retirement ceremony in the PRIDE 4 event.

== Mixed martial arts career ==
From 1996 to 1997, Kitao would have three mixed martial arts bouts. The first of them was for the Brazilian company Universal Vale Tudo Fighting, where he faced Luta Livre veteran Pedro "The Pedro" Otavio. Kitao fought as a Bukō Dōjō representative, wearing his sleeveless karategi and being cornered by his apprentices. At the start of the fight, Kitao immediately rushed Pedro to the corner and took him down, gaining dominant position over him thanks to his much bigger size. The sumo champion spent most of the bout smothering Otavio from the half guard, but the Brazilian lutador eventually managed to get free and gain Kitao's back, from where he threw three vicious elbow strikes to the back of his head and neck. Kitao tapped out, but Otavio still threw four more elbows before the referee's intervention and also stepped on the back of his head after the stoppage.

Kitao's second MMA fight was at the Ultimate Fighting Championship event UFC 9, facing Mark Hall. The fight was fast, as though Kitao took him down in seconds, one of Hall's punches broke his nose and made him bleed profusely, forcing the referee to stop the match for Hall's win. Koji later was invited to PRIDE 1, where he faced future WWE employee Nathan Jones. The Australian fighter caught Kitao in a standing guillotine choke and hit some knee strikes to the gut, but Koji trapped his leg and took him down, landing in side control. Kitao then worked an americana and Jones immediately tapped.

== Sumo coaching role ==
In the summer of 2003 he made a surprise return to the world of sumo when he was invited to oversee some practice sessions at his former Tatsunami stable. His return was possible thanks to the retirement of Kitao's old stablemaster Haguroyama Sojō, who had been accused of illegally pocketing money from the stable fundings. Kitao was invited by the new stablemaster thanks to the makushita Haguroumi, who had served as a tsukebito to Kitao in the past. Though Kitao and Haguroumi were on bad terms, Haguroumi asked for a reappraisal of Kitao's case, and it was clear that most of what was alleged to have taken place between Kitao and Sojō was made up by the latter. Kitao was keen to continue his work at Tatsunami, but was prevented from doing so by ill health.

== Other media ==
- In 1996, he had an appearance in the Jean-Claude Van Damme movie The Quest as the fighting representative of Japan, a sumo champion.
- Kitao appears unofficially in the games WCW vs. nWo: World Tour, and WCW/nWo Revenge, as Kim Chee.

== Personal life and death ==
In 2013, Kitao was diagnosed with kidney disease.

On March 29, 2019, his wife announced that Kitao had died on February 10 from chronic renal failure at the age of 55. She said in a television interview in June 2019 that her husband had also suffered from diabetes and he refused doctor's advice that he have a double leg amputation, instead nursing him at home with their daughter.

== Mixed martial arts record ==
Professional record breakdown
3 matches	1 win	2 losses
By knockout	0	2
By submission	1	0
By decision	0	0

Res.	Record	Opponent	Method	Event	Date	Round	Time	Location	Notes
Win	1–2	Nathan Jones	Submission (keylock)	Pride 1	11 October 1997	1	2:14	Tokyo, Japan	
Loss	0–2	Mark Hall	TKO (doctor stoppage)	UFC 9	17 May 1996	1	0:40	Detroit, Michigan, United States	
Loss	0–1	Pedro Otavio	TKO (submission to elbows)	Universal Vale Tudo Fighting 1	5 April 1996	1	5:49	Japan	

== Championships and accomplishments ==
- Kitao Dojo
  - Bukō Dojo Tournament (1995)
- Pro Wrestling Illustrated
  - Ranked No. 113 of the top 500 singles wrestlers of the PWI 500 in 1996
- Super World of Sports
  - One Night Tag Team Tournament (1990) – with Genichiro Tenryu
- Tokyo Sports
  - Topic Award (1990)
- Wrestle Association R
  - WAR World Six-Man Tag Team Championship (1 time) – with Nobukazu Hirai and Masaaki Mochizuki

== See also ==
- Glossary of sumo terms
- List of sumo tournament top division runners-up
- List of sumo tournament second division champions
- List of past sumo wrestlers
- List of yokozuna

Preceded by Takanosato Toshihide	60th Yokozuna; July 1986 – December 1987	Succeeded by Hokutoumi Nobuyoshi
Yokozuna is not a successive rank, and more than one wrestler can hold the title at once
