= Haguroyama Sojō =

Japanese sumo wrestler (1934–2021)

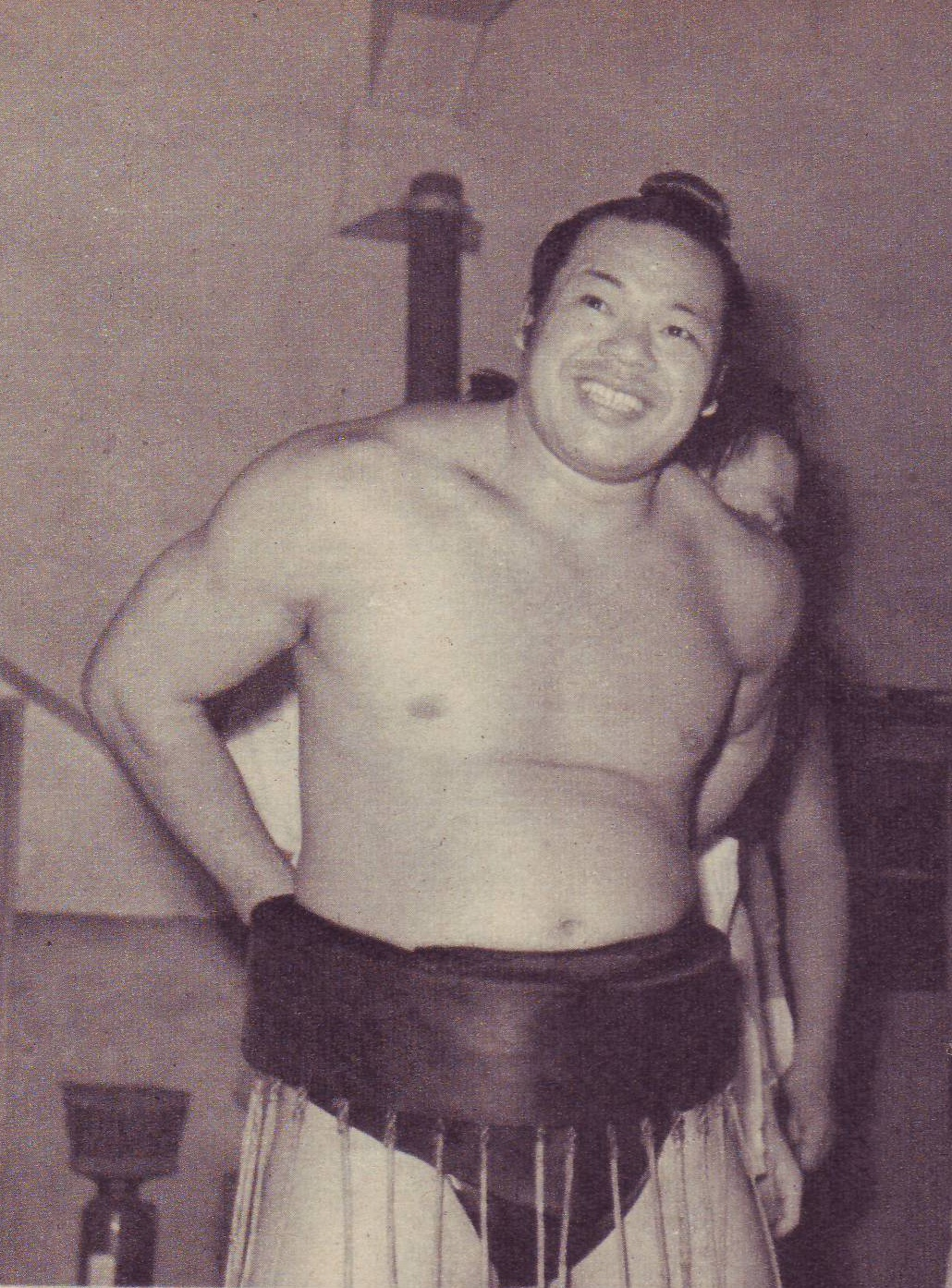
- Annenyama in 1961, around the time of his name change to Haguroyama.

Personal information
- Native name: 羽黒山 礎丞
- Born: Osamu Annen; 23 February 1934 Kamikawa, Hokkaidō
- Died: 8 February 2021 (aged 86) Tokyo, Japan
- Height: 1.81 m (5 ft 11 1/2 in)
- Weight: 111 kg (245 lb)

Sport
- Sport: Sumo
- Retired: March, 1965
- Heya: Tatsunami
- Record: 544-506-29-1draw
- Debut: January, 1950
- Highest rank: Sekiwake (September, 1957)
- Elder name: Tatsunami
- Championships: 1 (Makuuchi); 1 (Makushita)
- Special Prizes: Outstanding Performance (3); Fighting Spirit (1)
- Gold Stars: 10; Tochinishiki (4); Chiyonoyama (3); Wakanohana I (2); Asashio III
- Updated on June 2020

Haguroyama Sojō, born as Osamu Annen (23 February 1934 — 8 February 2021) was a Japanese sumo wrestler from Hokkaidō.

== Sumo career ==
As an active wrestler he was first known as Annenyama and reached a highest rank of sekiwake upon winning the top makuuchi division tournament championship in May 1957. Later in his career he was granted the sumo name Haguroyama, in honour of his father-in-law and stable boss, the 36th Yokozuna Haguroyama Masaji. He was also runner-up in the November 1959 tournament and over the course of his top division career earned ten gold stars for defeating yokozuna. However, he also lost all of 21 bouts against yokozuna Taihō Kōki.

== Coaching career ==
After retiring in 1965 he remained in the sumo world as an elder under the name Oitekaze. He became head coach of Tatsunami stable in 1969 upon Haguroyama Masaji's death and adopted the name Tatsunami Oyakata. He inherited a number of strong wrestlers such as future ōzeki Asahikuni. He coached Kōji Kitao to the top division in 1984, who became the 60th Yokozuna Futahaguro in 1986. However, after the two had a heated argument in December 1987 Futahaguro struck Tatsunami's wife and stormed out of the stable. Futahaguro was forced to resign by the Japan Sumo Association and Tatsunami filled out the yokozuna's retirement papers, the first time this had ever been done to a wrestler with elite sekitori status. Tatsunami was punished by a salary cut and told to stay away from all Sumo Association functions for three months. He later produced a number of other top division wrestlers such as Daishōhō and Daishōyama.

In February 1999 he reached the mandatory retirement age and passed on control of the stable to former komusubi Asahiyutaka, who had become his son-in-law and adopted son in April 1995. After their relationship soured and Asahiyutaka was divorced, he was ordered by the Tokyo District Court in February 2003 to pay Annen 175 million yen, the sum he would have had to pay for the right to the Tatsunami elder stock had he not been married to Annen's daughter. This was the first time a price had been revealed for elder stock, as the sums are normally kept secret. However, the Tokyo High Court in January 2004 overturned the original verdict.

== Personal life and death ==
Haguroyama died in a hospital in Tokyo, on 8 February 2021, at the age of 86. His death was not formally announced by the Japan Sumo Association until December of the same year.

== Career record ==
- The Kyushu tournament was first held in 1957, and the Nagoya tournament in 1958.

Haguroyama Sojo
-	Spring Haru basho, Tokyo	Summer Natsu basho, Tokyo	Autumn Aki basho, Tokyo
1950	West Banzuke-gai; 0–8	West Jonokuchi #6; 7–7–1	West Jonidan #17; 10–5
1951	East Jonidan #1; 9–6	West Sandanme #23; 10–5	East Sandanme #10; 9–6
1952	East Makushita #31; 10–5	East Makushita #19; 8–7	West Makushita #12; 7–8
Record given as wins–losses–absences Top division champion Top division runner-up Retired Lower divisions Non-participation Sanshō key: F=Fighting spirit; O=Outstanding performance; T=Technique Also shown: ★=Kinboshi; P=Playoff(s); Divisions: Makuuchi — Jūryō — Makushita — Sandanme — Jonidan — Jonokuchi Makuuchi ranks: Yokozuna — Ōzeki — Sekiwake — Komusubi — Maegashira

-	New Year Hatsu basho, Tokyo	Spring Haru basho, Osaka	Summer Natsu basho, Tokyo	Autumn Aki basho, Tokyo
1953	West Makushita #12; 8–7	East Makushita #8; 5–3	West Makushita #5; 7–1; Champion	East Jūryō #17; 7–8
1954	East Maegashira #20; 9–6	Not held	West Maegashira #12; 8–7	Not held
1955	West Maegashira #11; 8–6–1draw	East Maegashira #8; 9–6	West Maegashira #2; 8–7 ★	West Maegashira #1; 6–9 ★
1956	East Maegashira #4; 7–8	East Maegashira #4; 7–8	West Maegashira #4; 8–7 ★	West Maegashira #4; 5–10
Record given as wins–losses–absences Top division champion Top division runner-up Retired Lower divisions Non-participation Sanshō key: F=Fighting spirit; O=Outstanding performance; T=Technique Also shown: ★=Kinboshi; P=Playoff(s); Divisions: Makuuchi — Jūryō — Makushita — Sandanme — Jonidan — Jonokuchi Makuuchi ranks: Yokozuna — Ōzeki — Sekiwake — Komusubi — Maegashira

Year	January Hatsu basho, Tokyo	March Haru basho, Osaka	May Natsu basho, Tokyo	July Nagoya basho, Nagoya	September Aki basho, Tokyo	November Kyūshū basho, Fukuoka
1957	East Maegashira #6; 8–7	East Maegashira #4; 9–6 ★	West Komusubi; 13–2; O	Not held	West Sekiwake; 9–6	West Sekiwake; 6–9
1958	East Maegashira #1; 5–10	West Maegashira #5; 10–5 ★	West Sekiwake; 2–13	West Maegashira #4; 11–4; O★	West Sekiwake; 5–10	East Maegashira #2; 10–5; F★
1959	East Komusubi; 4–11	West Maegashira #3; 6–9	East Maegashira #8; 10–5	West Maegashira #1; 9–6	West Komusubi; 8–7	West Sekiwake; 12–3; O
1960	East Sekiwake; 8–7	West Sekiwake; 6–9	West Maegashira #1; 8–7 ★★	East Maegashira #1; 10–5	West Sekiwake; 8–7	West Sekiwake; 7–8
1961	West Komusubi; 8–7	West Komusubi; 5–10	West Maegashira #2; 10–5 ★	West Sekiwake; 7–8	West Komusubi; 9–6	West Sekiwake; 8–7
1962	East Sekiwake; 10–5	East Sekiwake; 8–7	East Sekiwake; 5–8–2	West Maegashira #2; 2–7–6	East Maegashira #9; 9–6	East Maegashira #3; 8–7
1963	West Komusubi; 2–13	West Maegashira #7; 10–5	East Maegashira #2; 2–13	West Maegashira #12; 11–4	East Maegashira #2; 5–10	East Maegashira #7; 10–5
1964	East Maegashira #1; 6–9	East Maegashira #4; 4–11	West Maegashira #6; 7–8	East Maegashira #7; 5–10	East Maegashira #12; 9–6	West Maegashira #8; 8–5–2
1965	East Maegashira #5; 1–10–4	West Maegashira #14; Retired; 0–0	x	x	x	x
Record given as wins–losses–absences Top division champion Top division runner-up Retired Lower divisions Non-participation Sanshō key: F=Fighting spirit; O=Outstanding performance; T=Technique Also shown: ★=Kinboshi; P=Playoff(s); Divisions: Makuuchi — Jūryō — Makushita — Sandanme — Jonidan — Jonokuchi Makuuchi ranks: Yokozuna — Ōzeki — Sekiwake — Komusubi — Maegashira

== See also ==
- List of sumo record holders
- List of sumo tournament top division champions
- Glossary of sumo terms
- List of past sumo wrestlers
- List of sekiwake
