= Haguroyama Masaji =

Japanese sumo wrestler

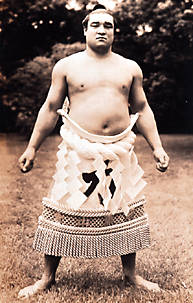
- Haguroyama, circa 1943

Personal information
- Native name: 羽黒山 政司
- Born: Kobayashi Masaji; November 18, 1914 Nakanokuchi, Japan
- Died: October 14, 1969 (aged 54)
- Height: 1.79 m (5 ft 10 1/2 in)
- Weight: 129.5 kg (285 lb)

Sport
- Sport: Sumo
- Retired: September, 1953
- Heya: Tatsunami
- Record: 359-99-117-1 draw
- Debut: January, 1934
- Highest rank: Yokozuna (May, 1941)
- Elder name: Tatsunami
- Championships: 7 (Makuuchi); 1 (Jūryō); 1 (Makushita); 1 (Sandanme); 1 (Jonidan); 1 (Jonokuchi)
- Updated on June 2020

Haguroyama Masaji (Japanese: 羽黒山 政司; November 18, 1914 – October 14, 1969) was a Japanese professional sumo wrestler from Nakanokuchi, Niigata. He was the sport's 36th yokozuna. He was a yokozuna for a period of twelve years and three months dating from his promotion to that rank in May 1941 until his retirement in September 1953, which was an all-time record until surpassed in 2019 by Hakuhō. During his career Haguroyama won seven top division championships and was runner-up on six other occasions. However, he was always in the shadow of yokozuna Futabayama, who came from the same stable. After his retirement he was the head coach of Tatsunami stable until his death in 1969.

== Career ==
Haguroyama's birth name was Kobayashi Masaji (小林 正治). Haguroyama made his professional debut in January 1934 at age 19, joining Tatsunami stable. His progression was remarkably rapid. He passed through all the lower divisions in just one tournament each, in every case winning the divisional championship – a feat unlikely ever to be equalled. He made his debut in the top makuuchi division in May 1937. He was promoted to the ōzeki rank after just one tournament at sekiwake. At the time of his promotion, he was the first wrestler from Niigata Prefecture to be promoted to this rank since Kagamiiwa Hamanosuke, 90 years earlier. After finishing as runner-up in the January 1941 tournament and winning his first top division title in May 1941 he was promoted to yokozuna. He chose the Shiranui style of yokozuna dohyō-iri (ring-entering ceremony) in honour of the recently deceased Tachiyama Mineemon. After three more runner-up performances he won his first championship as a yokozuna in May 1944.

Upon the retirement of his great rival Futabayama in November 1945 he became dominant, winning four consecutive tournaments. However, in November 1947 he severed his Achilles tendon and was out of action until May 1949. He won his final championship in January 1952 at age 37 with a perfect 15–0 record. It was his first tournament win in over four years. He retired in September 1953, when he was nearly 39.

He was known for his hard training and his great strength, and was said to be "made of steel."

== Retirement from sumo ==
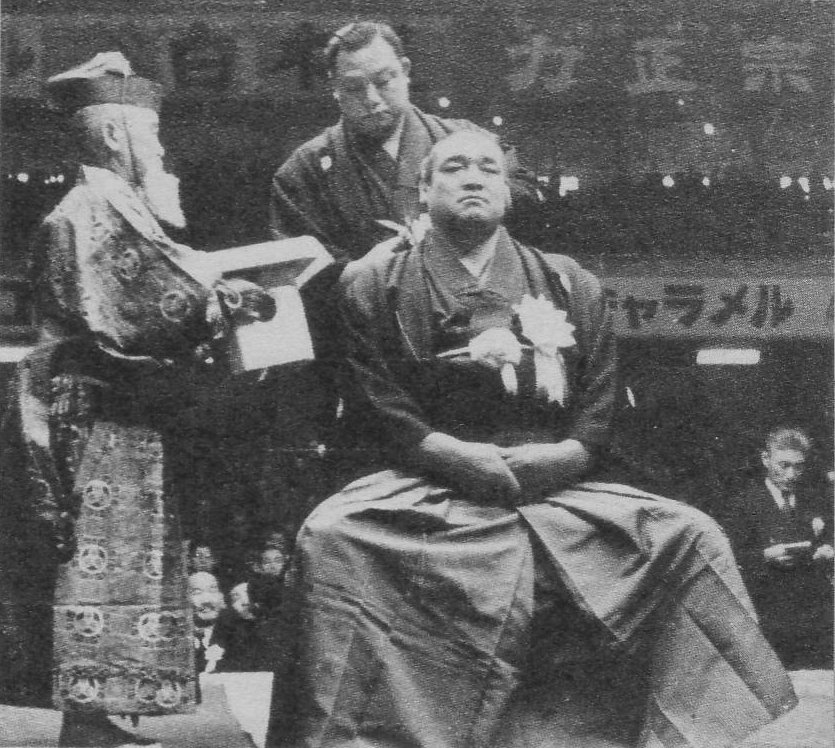
Haguroyama's danpatsu-shiki or retirement ceremony held in 1954

Haguroyama married the daughter of his stablemaster, which enabled him to become head coach of Tatsunami stable after retiring from the ring. He produced ōzeki Wakahaguro and several other top wrestlers. When he died in 1969 the title of Tatsunami Oyakata passed onto his son-in-law, former sekiwake Annenyama.

== Career Record ==
- Through most of the 1930s and 1940s only two tournaments were held a year, and in 1946 only one was held. The New year tournament began and the Spring tournament returned to Osaka in 1953.

Haguroyama Masaji
-	Spring Haru basho, Tokyo	Summer Natsu basho, Tokyo	Autumn Aki basho, Tokyo
1934	(Maezumo)	Shinjo; 2–1	Not held
1935	East Jonokuchi #1; 5–1; Champion	West Jonidan #10; 6–0; Champion	Not held
1936	East Sandanme #8; 6–0; Champion	West Makushita #12; 10–1; Champion	Not held
1937	East Jūryō #8; 9–2; Champion	West Maegashira #16; 9–4	Not held
1938	East Maegashira #5; 10–3	East Komusubi; 7–6	Not held
1939	East Komusubi; 8–4–1	East Sekiwake; 11–4	Not held
1940	East Ōzeki; 11–4	East Ōzeki #1; 7–5–3	Not held
1941	West Ōzeki; 14–1	West Ōzeki; 14–1	Not held
1942	East Yokozuna; 13–2	East Yokozuna; 2–4–9	Not held
1943	West Yokozuna; 13–2	East Yokozuna; 14–1	Not held
1944	West Yokozuna; 12–3	East Yokozuna; 10–0	East Yokozuna; 7–3
1945	Not held	East Yokozuna; 5–2	East Yokozuna; 10–0
1946	Not held	Not held	West Yokozuna; 13–0
1947	Not held	East Yokozuna; 9–1–PP	East Yokozuna; 10–1
1948	Not held	Sat out due to injury	Sat out due to injury
1949	Sat out due to injury	West Yokozuna; 11–4	West Yokozuna; 12–3
1950	East Yokozuna; 6–4–5	East Yokozuna; 12–3	West Yokozuna; 4–1–10
1951	East Yokozuna; 12–3	West Yokozuna; 10–5	East Yokozuna; 10–5
1952	East Yokozuna; 15–0	East Yokozuna; 7–3–5	East Yokozuna; 4–3–8
Record given as wins–losses–absences Top division champion Top division runner-up Retired Lower divisions Non-participation Sanshō key: F=Fighting spirit; O=Outstanding performance; T=Technique Also shown: ★=Kinboshi; P=Playoff(s); Divisions: Makuuchi — Jūryō — Makushita — Sandanme — Jonidan — Jonokuchi Makuuchi ranks: Yokozuna — Ōzeki — Sekiwake — Komusubi — Maegashira

-	New Year Hatsu basho, Tokyo	Spring Haru basho, Osaka	Summer Natsu basho, Tokyo	Autumn Aki basho, Tokyo
1953	West Yokozuna; 9–6	Sat out due to injury	West Yokozuna; 0–3–12	East Yokozuna; Retired; 0–0–15
Record given as wins–losses–absences Top division champion Top division runner-up Retired Lower divisions Non-participation Sanshō key: F=Fighting spirit; O=Outstanding performance; T=Technique Also shown: ★=Kinboshi; P=Playoff(s); Divisions: Makuuchi — Jūryō — Makushita — Sandanme — Jonidan — Jonokuchi Makuuchi ranks: Yokozuna — Ōzeki — Sekiwake — Komusubi — Maegashira

== See also ==
- Glossary of sumo terms
- List of past sumo wrestlers
- List of sumo tournament top division champions
- List of yokozuna

Preceded by Futabayama Sadaji	36th Yokozuna; 1941–1953	Succeeded by Akinoumi Setsuo
Yokozuna is not a successive rank, and more than one wrestler can hold the title at once
