= Asahiyutaka Katsuteru =

Japanese sumo wrestler

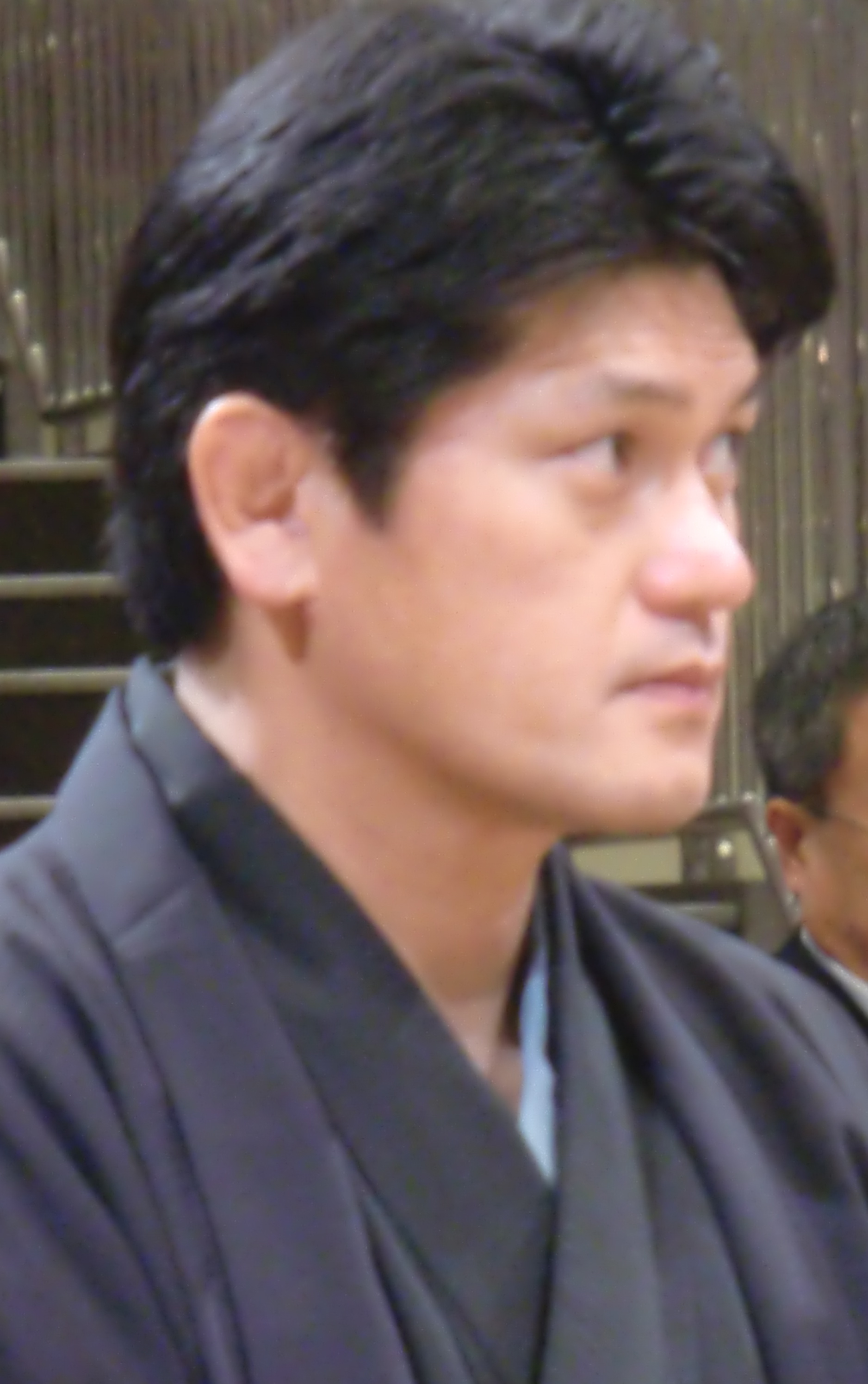

Personal information
- Native name: 旭豊 勝照
- Born: Taiji Ichikawa; 10 September 1968 (age 58) Kasugai, Aichi
- Height: 1.91 m (6 ft 3 in)
- Weight: 145 kg (320 lb)

Sport
- Sport: Sumo
- Retired: January 1999
- Heya: Ōshima
- Record: 364-341-28
- Debut: March, 1987
- Highest rank: Komusubi (May, 1996)
- Elder name: Tatsunami
- Championships: 1 (Jūryō); 2 (Makushita)
- Special Prizes: Fighting Spirit (1); Outstanding Performance (1)
- Gold Stars: 4 Akebono (2); Takanohana II (2)
- Updated on July 2008

Asahiyutaka Katsuteru (born 10 September 1968) is a former sumo wrestler from Kasugai, Aichi, Japan. His highest rank was komusubi. He is now the head coach of Tatsunami stable.

== Career ==
Asahiyutaka joined Ōshima stable and made his professional debut in March 1987, and was ranked in the lowest jonokuchi division in his first tournament. However, due to various injury problems he fell off the banzuke ranking sheets and did not have his first win in the jonokuchi division until May 1988. By May 1990 he had progressed to the makushita division and in September 1993 after taking his second makushita yusho (tournament championship), he was promoted to the second highest jūryō division. In January 1995, after winning the jūryō yusho he made the top makuuchi division.

Asahiyutaka was ranked in the top division for 24 tournaments, winning two special prizes for Outstanding Performance and Technique. He also earned four kinboshi or gold stars for defeating yokozuna. He reached his highest rank of komusubi in 1996 and held it for three tournaments, but he lacked the weight to regularly beat the top men, and never managed to progress further.

== Retirement from sumo ==
In 1995 he had married the daughter of Osamu Annen, the head coach of the Tatsunami stable, and was legally adopted by him as his son, changing his legal name from Taiji Ichikawa to Taiji Annen. This enabled him to take over the Tatsunami stable when Annen reached the mandatory retirement age of sixty five, in February 1999. Asahiyutaka had lost his top division status at the previous tournament in January, recording only four wins at maegashira 13, and had announced his retirement from active competition.

Asahiyutaka's marriage allowed him to inherit the Tatsunami elder name and stable, but the couple divorced in August 2001. In February 2003, Annen took Asahiyutaka to court, demanding that he be paid for the elder stock that Asahiyutaka had received for free as a result of his marriage. Annen was initially awarded 175 million yen, but Asahiyutaka appealed and the decision was overturned by a higher court in January 2004. Annen did succeed however, in evicting Asahiyutaka from the stable premises.

In 2005, Asahiyutaka moved Tatsunami stable to a new site and remarried. He recruited the Mongolian wrestler Mōkonami who reached the top division in 2009, but Mokonami was forced to retire in 2011 after he was found guilty of match-fixing.

Asahiyutaka voted against the Tatsunami-Isegahama group of stables preferred candidate for the head of the Sumo Association in the 2012 elections, and left the group as a result, aligning his stable with the Takanohana group instead. That group was dissolved by the Sumo Association after high profile scandals involving Takanohana and the stable went independent in 2018, but after the Sumo Association indicated that stables must belong to an ichimon, it aligned itself with the Dewanoumi group. After several years without any sekitori, Meisei reached the jūryō division in 2016. Although he also raised Akua, who reached sekitori status in 2018, his most successful apprentice is Hōshōryū, nephew of former yokozuna Asashōryū, who reached sekitori status in 2019, was promoted to ōzeki in 2023, and yokozuna in 2025.

== Fighting style ==
Asahiyutaka was a yotsu-sumo wrestler who specialised in grappling rather than pushing techniques. His preferred grip on the opponent's mawashi was hidari-yotsu, a right hand outside, left hand inside position. His favourite kimarite were uwatenage (overarm throw) and katasukashi (under-shoulder swing down).

== Career record ==
Asahiyutaka Katsuteru
Year	January Hatsu basho, Tokyo	March Haru basho, Osaka	May Natsu basho, Tokyo	July Nagoya basho, Nagoya	September Aki basho, Tokyo	November Kyūshū basho, Fukuoka
1987	x	(Maezumo)	West Jonokuchi #9; Sat out due to injury 0–0–7	(Banzukegai)	(Banzukegai)	West Jonokuchi #44; 0–2–5
1988	East Jonokuchi #45; Sat out due to injury 0–0–7	(Banzukegai)	West Jonokuchi #9; 5–2	East Jonidan #101; 6–1	East Jonidan #31; 5–2	West Sandanme #93; Sat out due to injury 0–0–7
1989	West Jonidan #53; 4–3	East Jonidan #27; 4–3	West Jonidan #7; 5–2	West Sandanme #71; 5–2	East Sandanme #35; 3–4	West Sandanme #51; 4–3
1990	East Sandanme #32; 5–2	East Sandanme #6; 5–2	West Makushita #44; 1–6	East Sandanme #17; 3–4	West Sandanme #34; 6–1	East Makushita #54; 4–3
1991	West Makushita #40; 2–5	West Sandanme #4; 5–2	East Makushita #44; 4–3	West Makushita #29; 5–2	East Makushita #16; 5–2	East Makushita #7; 3–4
1992	East Makushita #13; 2–5	West Makushita #28; 3–4	West Makushita #41; 6–1	East Makushita #18; 5–2	East Makushita #10; 3–4	West Makushita #16; 7–0; Champion
1993	East Makushita #1; 2–6	West Makushita #13; 5–2	West Makushita #5; 5–2	West Makushita #1; 3–4	East Makushita #4; 7–0; Champion	West Jūryō #10; 8–7
1994	East Jūryō #7; 7–8	East Jūryō #8; 10–5	East Jūryō #5; 8–7	West Jūryō #2; 7–8	West Jūryō #5; 7–8	West Jūryō #6; 9–6
1995	East Jūryō #2; 11–4–PP; Champion	East Maegashira #15; 8–7	East Maegashira #10; 6–9	West Maegashira #15; 9–6	East Maegashira #7; 7–8	East Maegashira #8; 8–7
1996	West Maegashira #4; 6–9	East Maegashira #6; 9–6; O★	West Komusubi #1; 8–7	East Komusubi #1; 7–8	East Maegashira #1; 9–6; F★	East Komusubi #1; 5–10
1997	East Maegashira #3; 4–11	East Maegashira #8; 6–9	West Maegashira #12; 9–6	West Maegashira #5; 6–9	West Maegashira #7; 8–7	East Maegashira #2; 6–9 ★
1998	West Maegashira #4; 3–12 ★	East Maegashira #11; 8–7	West Maegashira #6; 7–8	East Maegashira #8; 8–7	East Maegashira #3; 3–12	East Maegashira #10; 6–9
1999	East Maegashira #13; Retired; 4–9	x	x	x	x	x
Record given as wins–losses–absences Top division champion Top division runner-up Retired Lower divisions Non-participation Sanshō key: F=Fighting spirit; O=Outstanding performance; T=Technique Also shown: ★=Kinboshi; P=Playoff(s); Divisions: Makuuchi — Jūryō — Makushita — Sandanme — Jonidan — Jonokuchi Makuuchi ranks: Yokozuna — Ōzeki — Sekiwake — Komusubi — Maegashira

== See also ==
- Glossary of sumo terms
- List of sumo tournament second division champions
- List of past sumo wrestlers
- List of sumo elders
- List of komusubi
