= Hakuhō Shō =

Japanese sumo wrestler (born 1985)

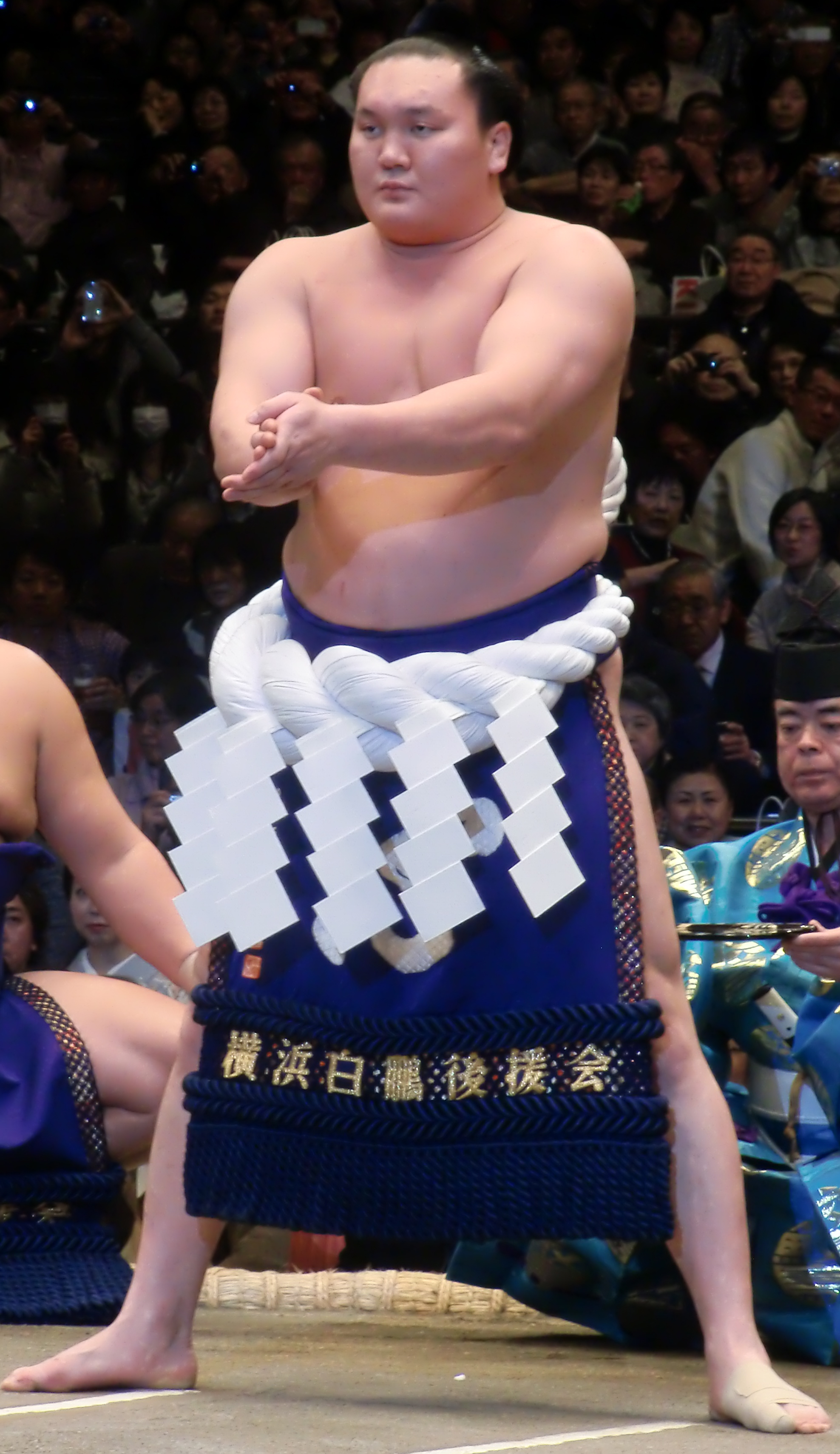
- Hakuhō in January 2012

Personal information
- Native name: 白鵬 翔
- Born: Mönkhbatyn Davaajargal; 11 March 1985 (age 41) Ulaanbaatar, Mongolian People's Republic
- Height: 192 cm (76 in)
- Weight: 155 kg (342 lb; 24 st)

Sport
- Sport: Sumo
- Retired: September 30, 2021
- Heya: Miyagino
- Record: 1187–247–253
- Debut: March 2001
- Highest rank: Yokozuna (May 2007)
- Elder name: Miyagino
- Championships: 45 (Makuuchi); 1 (Jūryō)
- Special Prizes: Outstanding Performance (3); Fighting Spirit (1); Technique (2)
- Gold Stars: 1 (Asashōryū)
- Updated on 28 January 2023

Hakuhō Shō (Japanese: 白鵬 翔; born 11 March 1985 as Mönkhbatyn Davaajargal (Mongolian: Мөнхбатын Даваажаргал; IPA: [mөnxpatʰin taw̜aːt͡ʃargaɮ])) is a Mongolian-born former professional sumo wrestler (rikishi) from Ulaanbaatar, Mongolia. Making his debut in March 2001, he reached the top makuuchi division in May 2004. In May 2007 at age 22, he became the second native of Mongolia, the fourth non-Japanese, and 69th overall rikishi to be promoted to the highest rank in sumo, yokozuna. With a record 45 total championships (yūshō) at the top makuuchi division, he is widely considered to be the greatest sumo wrestler of all time. He acquired Japanese citizenship in 2019.

In 2009, he broke the record for the most wins in a calendar year, winning 86 out of 90 bouts, and repeated this feat with the same record again in 2010 when he established the second longest winning streak in sumo history. He also holds the record for the most undefeated tournament championships at sixteen, which is eight more than any other sumo wrestler in history.

He was the only active yokozuna from 2010, following the retirement of his rival and fellow Mongolian Asashōryū, until 2012 with the promotion of fellow Mongolian Harumafuji. In March 2021, he became the only active yokozuna once again following the retirement of his rival and fellow Mongolian Kakuryū until the promotion of fellow Mongolian Terunofuji four months later.

In January 2015, he broke Taihō's long-standing record by winning his 33rd top division championship, the most in the history of sumo. He holds the records for most wins in the top division, achieved in May 2016, and most career wins, achieved in July 2017. He was the longest-serving yokozuna of all-time, having surpassed Haguroyama's record in 2019, and fought his 1000th bout as a yokozuna in July 2020.

Hakuhō retired from professional sumo at the end of September 2021, closing out a 20-year career in the sport. Sumo commentator John Gunning noted that Hakuhō left an unmatchable legacy, while Washington Post columnist Stephen Stromberg called him "possibly the most accomplished figure in any sport, ever".

Hakuhō departed from the Japan Sumo Association in June 2025, after he was relieved from overseeing his stable in early 2024 following an investigation into assaults on the part of his wrestler Hokuseihō.

== Early life and sumo background ==
Like many of his countrymen in professional sumo, Hakuhō belongs to a family in the Mongolian wrestling tradition. His father Jigjidiin Mönkhbat won a silver medal in freestyle wrestling at the 1968 Summer Olympics, his country's first ever Olympic medal, and held the highest ranking in Mongolian wrestling, "Darkhan Avarga" (meaning "Undisputed Champion"), which is the Mongolian equivalent of yokozuna. Davaajargal did not however have any formal training in Mongolian wrestling himself, as his father wished him to try other sports, and he concentrated on basketball as a child instead. However, at an early age he would be seen reading sumo magazines, and when his father asked him why he liked sumo so much, he responded by saying he wanted to be as big as a sumo wrestler one day. At that time he was considered below average in size.

He went to Japan in October 2000 when he was fifteen years old, invited by pioneering Mongolian wrestler Kyokushūzan. Because he weighed only 62 kg (137 lb), no sumo training stable (heya) was prepared to accept him. Hearing this, Kyokushūzan asked heya master Miyagino-oyakata to intercede, and Davaajargal was accepted to Miyagino stable on the last day of his two-month stay in Japan, 24 December 2000. He was given the ring name (shikona) Hakuhō, with haku meaning "white" and hō, meaning the Chinese mythological bird Peng. His shikona also emulates that of former yokozuna Taihō, whose rivalry with Kashiwado became known as the Hakuhō era.

Hakuhō made his professional debut at the March tournament (honbasho) in Osaka in 2001 despite having no previous wrestling experience. His weight increased steadily as he rose in the ranks reaching the second highest jūryō division in January 2004, and the top makuuchi division in May of the same year. In his very first top-division tournament, he scored twelve wins against three losses and was awarded a special prize (sanshō) for Fighting Spirit. He also enjoyed great success in subsequent tournaments, winning a gold star (kinboshi) for defeating yokozuna Asashōryū in November 2004 while still at the lowest makuuchi rank of maegashira. This tournament also saw him finish as runner-up for the first time. He achieved a rapid promotion to the rank of komusubi in January 2005 and sekiwake only one tournament later. His progress was delayed by an injury which forced him to take leave (zen-kyu) from the Nagoya tournament in 2005.

His ōzeki promotion came in March 2006 after a 13–2 record, which included a playoff for the championship (which he lost to Asashōryū) and also earned him two special prizes for Outstanding Performance and Technique. This gave him a three tournament record of 35 wins against ten losses. His promotion was confirmed just a few weeks after his twenty-first birthday, making him the fourth youngest wrestler to reach ōzeki in modern sumo history.

== Ōzeki ==
At his first tournament as ōzeki in May 2006, with Asashōryū absent, Hakuhō won his first championship (yūshō) with a 14–1 record, defeating Miyabiyama in another playoff. After another strong performance (13–2) in July, in which he finished as runner-up to Asashōryū and defeated him on the final day, Hakuhō was denied promotion to yokozuna, despite the Japan Sumo Association's chairman Kitanoumi saying before the tournament that he would be considered if he posted 13 wins. Hakuhō told an interviewer that he had expected to be promoted. An uncharacteristically poor 8–7 showing in September put an end to any immediate promotion hopes. An injury sustained in training prevented him from participating in the November tournament, putting him at risk for demotion (kadoban) in January 2007, when he scored a respectable ten wins on his return to the ring.

== Promotion to yokozuna ==
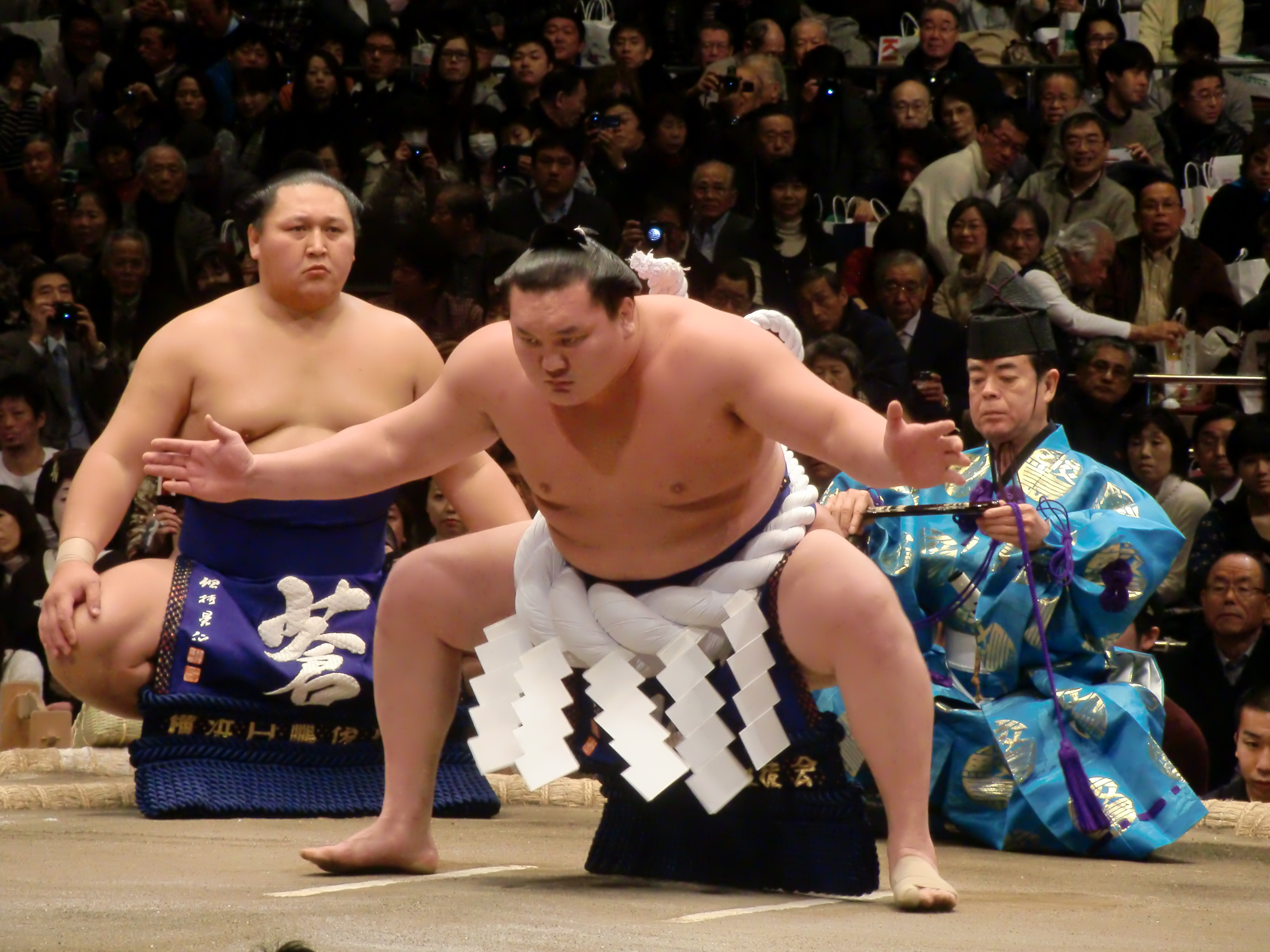
Hakuhō performs the Shiranui style dohyō-iri.

In March 2007 Hakuhō won his second championship in Osaka and a third championship in the very next tournament in May, with a perfect 15–0 (zenshō) record. Winning two consecutive championships satisfies the de facto requirements for promotion to the top rank in sumo. On the day following the tournament, the Yokozuna Deliberation Council unanimously recommended his promotion to yokozuna which was formally announced by the Japan Sumo Association on 30 May 2007. He had become yokozuna at the age of 22 years and two months – only Kitanoumi and Taihō had been younger when they were promoted. He performed his inaugural ring-entering ceremony (dohyō-iri) at the Meiji Shrine (in the lesser-used Shiranui style) on 1 June. He performed the ceremony at the Kokugikan during Kyokushūzan's retirement ceremony (danpatsu-shiki) on 2 June.

== Yokozuna ==
=== 2007 ===
Hakuhō's first tournament as a yokozuna was in July 2007. His 25 match winning streak was brought to an end by Kotomitsuki on the 10th day, and further losses to Kotoōshū and Chiyotaikai put him out of contention for the title. He finished the tournament with an 11–4 record.

Hakuhō's first tournament championship as a yokozuna came in September 2007 with a 13–2 record, triumphing over Chiyotaikai on the last day. His second title as a yokozuna, and fifth overall, came in the following tournament in November with a 12–3 score. He lost to Kotomitsuki on the final day but the championship had already been decided earlier in the day when his only challenger Chiyotaikai pulled out through injury. His yokozuna rival Asashōryū missed both these tournaments through suspension.

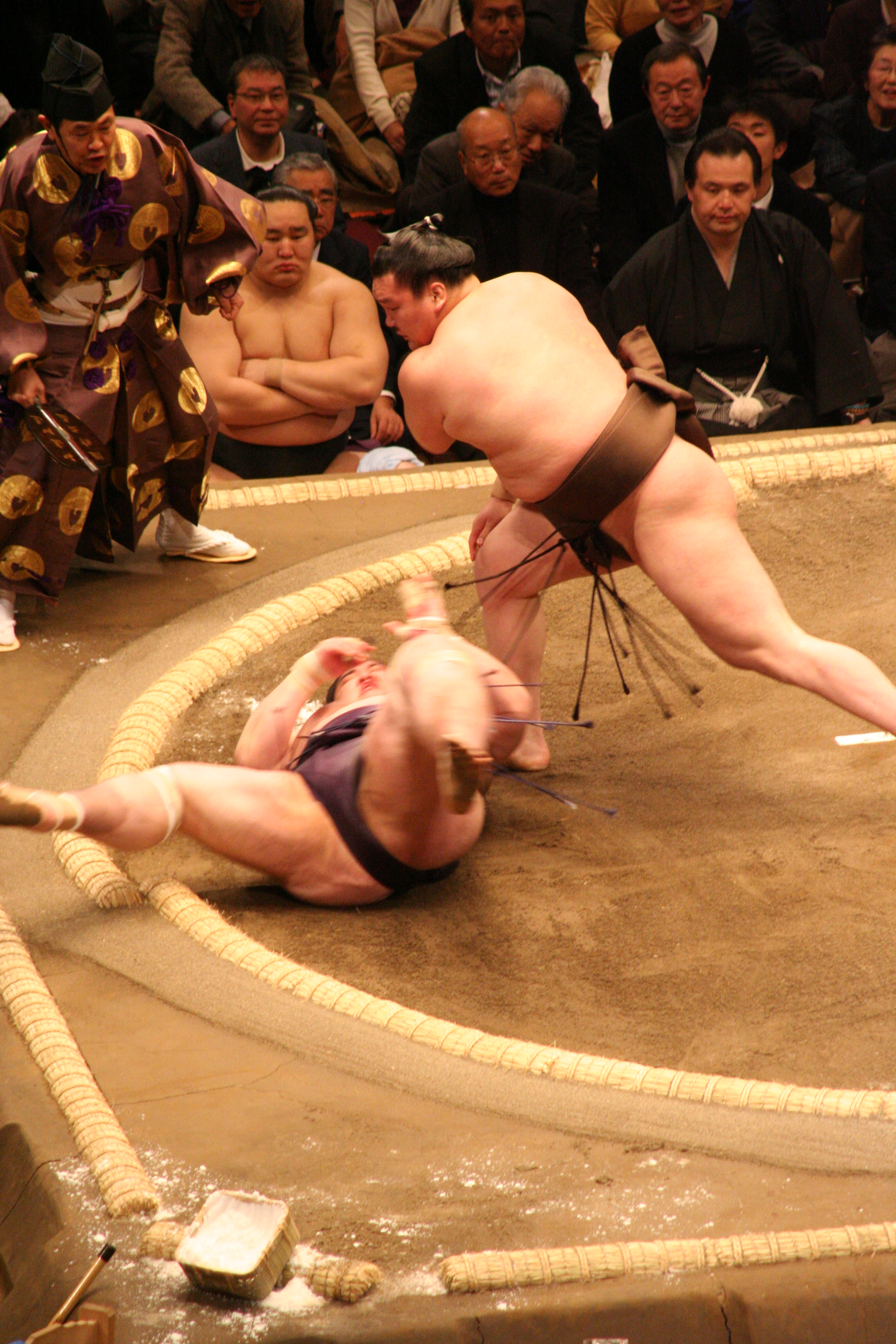
Hakuhō throws Dejima in the January 2008 tournament

=== 2008 ===
In the January 2008 tournament, he faced the returning Asashōryū on the final day with both wrestlers having a 13–1 score. In a bout lasting nearly a minute, Hakuhō defeated Asashōryū, winning his 6th championship with a 14–1 record. In the March 2008 tournament the two yokozuna met once again to decide the title and this time Asashōryū got his revenge, with Hakuhō finishing as runner-up.

In the May 2008 tournament, he won his first nine consecutive bouts. On the 10th day, however, he lost to Ama for the fourth time in their last five meetings, injuring his ankle in the process. Subsequent losses to Kotoōshū (the eventual winner of the tournament) and Kotomitsuki put him out of contention for the championship. He finished on 11–4, losing to Asashōryū on the final day in a match that sparked scandal after the two yokozuna nearly came to blows when Asashōryū gave Hakuhō an extra shove after the bout was over. Both wrestlers were given a warning over their conduct by the Japan Sumo Association.

In July 2008, with Asashōryū pulling out through injury he won his seventh championship without a serious challenge, securing victory by the 13th day: the first time this had been achieved since January 2005. He finished the tournament unbeaten; his second zenshō-yūshō. Although he lost on day five of the September tournament, he still dominated all other opponents and secured another championship on the 14th day. He finished the tournament with a 14–1 record.

In the November tournament Hakuhō was once again the sole yokozuna participating. He lost his opening bout to Aminishiki and his 12th day bout to Ama. Both Hakuhō and Ama finished with a 13–2 record and the eventual play-off was won by Hakuhō, handing him his fourth yūshō of the season and ninth in total.

=== 2009 ===
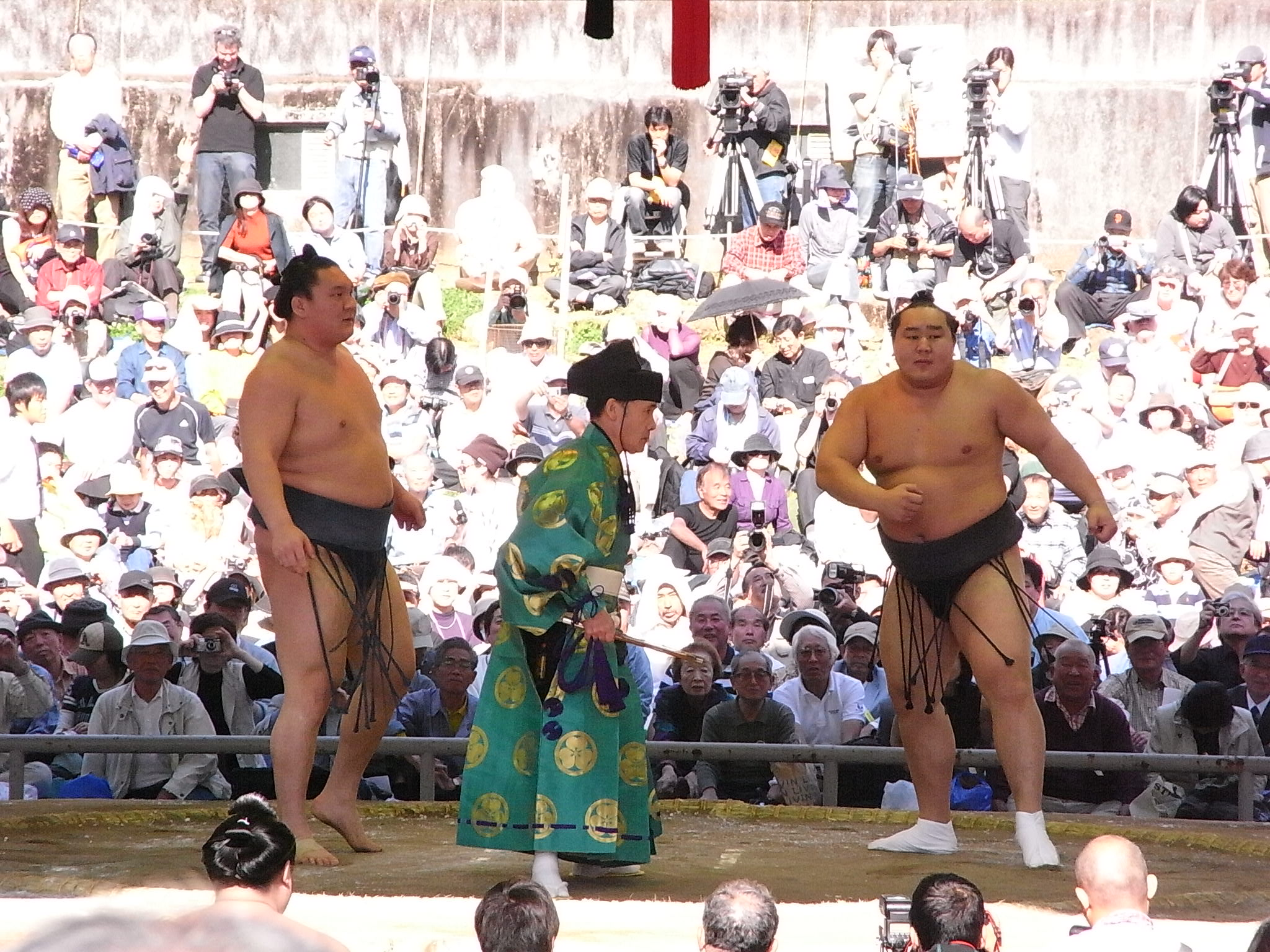
Hakuhō fights Asashōryū in an exhibition bout on 10 April 2009.

In the January 2009 tournament Hakuhō defeated Asashōryū on the final day in their first meeting since May, handing his fellow yokozuna his first defeat of the tournament and leaving both men with identical 14–1 records. Hakuhō was however beaten in the subsequent playoff. Hakuhō defeated Asashōryū again in the March tournament, this time capping off an undefeated 15–0 championship, his third zenshō-yūshō and his tenth championship overall.

In May he extended his winning run to 33 regulation bouts, the best since Asashōryū's 35 in 2004, until he was defeated by Kotoōshū on Day 14. He recovered to beat Asashōryū on Day 15 to finish at 14–1, but he lost the playoff bout to Harumafuji who claimed his first championship.

In July he won his eleventh championship, finishing one win ahead of Kotoōshū with another 14–1 score. He almost pulled off his twelfth championship in the following September tournament. One win behind Asashōryū for most of the tournament after giving away his first kinboshi in a year (to Shōtenrō) he forced a playoff by beating his rival on the final day, but then lost in the succeeding playoff bout. This was a very similar scenario to his loss to Asashōryū in the preceding January tournament. Regardless of this loss, he still managed to become the first makuuchi wrestler ever to win fourteen or more bouts in five consecutive tournaments. He also became the first wrestler ever to lose three makuuchi playoffs in one year. After the tournament he was diagnosed with ligament damage in his left elbow; however surgery was not required.

On 28 November, the fourteenth day of the Kyūshū basho, he clinched his twelfth tournament championship and broke Asashōryū's 2005 record for most bouts won in a calendar year, which had stood at 84. He defeated Asashōryū the following day to secure his fourth career zenshō-yūshō and set his 2009 record total at 86 wins. This was also his fourteenth consecutive yūshō or jun-yūshō (winner or runner-up) performance, another record.

=== 2010 ===
In the opening tournament of the year Hakuhō's 30 bout winning streak was ended by Baruto on Day 7, and he suffered consecutive losses to ozeki Harumafuji and Kaiō on Days 12 and 13 to concede the title to Asashōryū by Day 14. He gained some consolation by beating his yokozuna rival for the seventh straight time in regulation bouts on the final day to finish the tournament on 12–3.

Hakuhō expressed his shock at the retirement of Asashōryū in February, following allegations his fellow yokozuna had assaulted a man in a drunken brawl outside a nightclub during the previous tournament. Fighting back tears he said, "I don't want to believe it. I was honoured to wrestle in the same era as him." After getting regularly beaten by Asashōryū earlier in his career, Hakuhō came to completely dominate him, winning all of their last seven regulation matches (excluding two tournament-playoff defeats) and finishing with a 14–13 record over his greatest rival.

He won the Osaka tournament in March with a perfect 15–0 record, his fifth undefeated score and thirteenth championship overall. After his victory he spoke of the extra pressure now that he was sumo's lone yokozuna and his relief at the win.

Hakuhō wrapped up his fourteenth championship in May by Day 13 (his earliest yūshō win since July 2008) and went on to record his sixth zenshō-yūshō, the first time he has achieved this in consecutive tournaments. With the win, he equalled the number of yūshō won by yokozuna Wajima, and to commemorate this he switched to wearing Wajima's trademark gold coloured mawashi.

In July 2010 a special committee reviewing the extent of illegal gambling within sumo revealed that Hakuhō had bet several tens of thousands of yen on hanafuda Japanese card games with his fellow wrestlers twice a year or so. However, the committee said that he would not be punished as it was not considered a serious offence. He nonetheless appeared along with nearly 80 other wrestlers at a press conference and apologised to sumo fans for his actions. On the 14th day of the Nagoya tournament he won his 46th consecutive bout, surpassing Taihō's 45, behind only Chiyonofuji's 53 and Futabayama's 69 as the longest winning run since the beginning of the Shōwa era. He clinched his fifteenth yūshō on the same day, and on the final day he secured his third consecutive 15–0 record, the first wrestler ever to achieve this. However, he did not receive the Emperor's Cup or any other trophy, as the Sumo Association decided to withdraw them in response to the gambling scandal. Hakuhō commented, "I hope we will not have a tournament like this ever again."

On Day 6 of the Aki basho in September he equalled the 53-bout winning streak of Chiyonofuji with a win over Kotoshōgiku, and surpassed it the following day by pushing out Kisenosato in front of the first sell-out crowd of the tournament so far. He said afterwards that he felt "I really repaid my debt of gratitude" to the former Chiyonofuji. He secured his fourth consecutive yūshō on the fourteenth day when rank-and-filers Yoshikaze and Takekaze suffered defeats, and he moved to 14–0 (and 61 consecutive wins) by beating Kotoōshū. Asked about Futabayama's record of 69 wins, set in the two tournament a year era from 1936 to 1939, he responded, "It is truly amazing that he was able to continue winning for almost three years." Former Sumo Association Kitanoumi estimated that Hakuhō had a possibility of "about 80 percent" of breaking the record, which he would achieve on the eighth day of the November tournament. Hakuhō wrapped up the Aki basho by defeating Harumafuji to achieve his fourth perfect record in a row. This was also his eighth zenshō-yūshō overall, equalling the record held jointly Futabayama and Taihō.

On the first day of the November 2010 tournament, Hakuhō defeated Tochinoshin, tying the consecutive wins record of Tanikaze with 63. However, on the following day his run was finally brought to an end when he was defeated by Kisenosato. This was only the fifth time in his yokozuna career that Hakuhō has been defeated by a maegashira, and Kisenosato is the first to earn more than one kinboshi from him, having previously upset him in September 2008. However, Hakuhō won all his remaining bouts and defeated maegashira Toyonoshima in a playoff to win the championship. He finished the year on 86 wins in regulation matches, equalling the record he set in 2009. At a press conference following his victory, he revealed that having his winning run halted before breaking Futabayama's record affected him so badly that he considered withdrawing from the tournament.

On 21 December he was awarded the Japan Professional Sports Grand Prize, receiving the Prime Minister's Trophy from Naoto Kan.

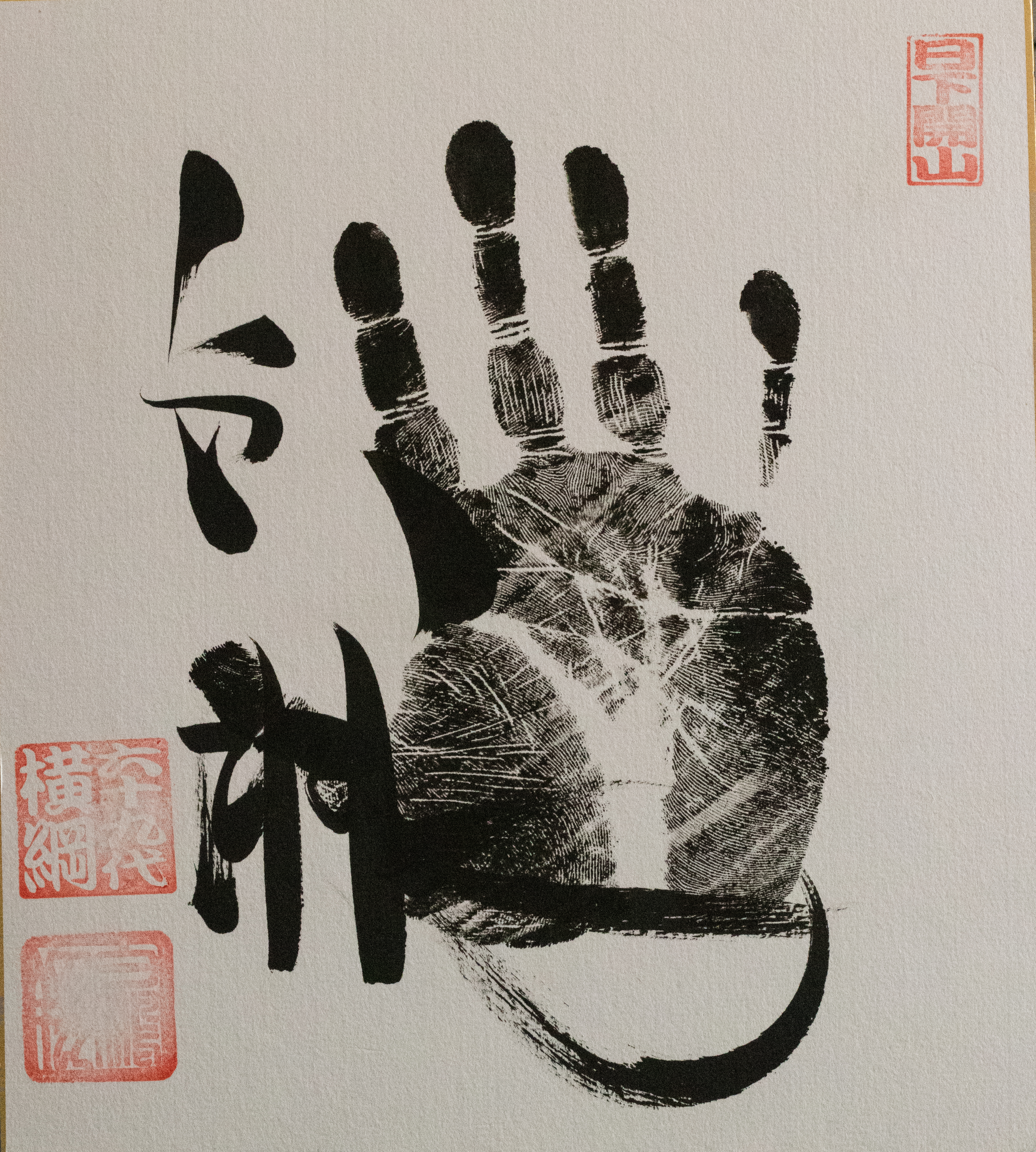
Yokozuna Hakuho original tegata (handprint & signature)

=== 2011 ===
In the January 2011 tournament in Tokyo he was surprisingly beaten by Kisenosato for the second time in a row but he secured his eighteenth championship on the fourteenth day. In doing so Hakuhō became only the third man after Taihō and Asashōryū to win six consecutive tournaments.

During the May "technical examination tournament" Hakuhō notched up his 500th win in the top division, with a victory over Kitataiki on Day 5. He achieved this total with the loss of just 99 top division bouts since his debut in May 2004 – a winning percentage of 83%. He was defeated by Harumafuji on Day 13 but went on to win his seventh straight championship, equalling Asashōryū's record, despite losing to Kaiō on the final day.

Hakuhō was defeated on the eleventh day of the July 2011 tournament by sekiwake Kotoshōgiku and his quest for a record eighth straight yūshō ended on Day 14 when he was beaten by Harumafuji to drop two wins behind. He also lost his final day match to Baruto to finish on 12–3, his poorest result since January 2010. Nevertheless, it was still enough for runner-up honours, his twelfth.

He was defeated by Kisenosato for the third time in five meetings on Day 12 of the September tournament and then lost to Kotoshōgiku for the second time in a row the following day. However he rallied to beat Baruto on Day 14 and then Harumafuji on the final day to clinch his twentieth tournament championship. On 25 November 2011, he won his 21st tournament title in Fukuoka, moving to 13–0 with none of his rivals scoring better than 10–3. He finished the tournament on 14–1, his only loss coming to Baruto on the final day.

=== 2012 ===
Hakuhō finished second to Baruto in the opening tournament of 2012, losing to Kakuryū, Harumafuji and Kotoōshū. He did however maintain his record of finishing runner-up or better in his last 26 tournaments. In the March basho, Hakuhō won his twenty-second yūshō after beating Kakuryū in a playoff, finishing with a 13–2 record. Hakuhō's only losses came to Kakuryū on the 9th day and Kisenosato on the 13th day. Kakuryū had entered the final day of the tournament one match ahead of the yokozuna but lost to Gōeidō, and Hakuhō beat Baruto to force a playoff. This marked the first time a wrestler had come from one win behind to claim the yūshō on the final day since Asashōryū defeated Hokutōriki in a playoff in May 2004. With this victory Hakuhō drew level with Takanohana in fifth place on the all–time list of most top division tournament championships.

In the May 2012 tournament Hakuhō fractured his left index finger in an opening day loss to Aminishiki, and he dropped further matches to Toyohibiki, Gōeidō and Toyonoshima on Days 7, 8 and 9 to stand at only 5–4 after nine days. However he then won five bouts in a row and was even in with an outside chance of claiming the yūshō until it was announced that Kotoōshū was withdrawing on the final day and giving Tochiōzan an automatic twelfth win. Hakuhō's defeat by Harumafuji on Day 15 meant he finished on 10–5, his worst ever score as a yokozuna and the first time since his debut at the rank, 29 tournaments ago, that he failed to be at least the runner–up.

After losing to Harumafuji on the last day in both the July and September tournaments (as well as maegashira Tochiōzan in September) and seeing his fellow Mongolian claim the yūshō in both and earn promotion to yokozuna himself, Hakuhō came back to win his 23rd championship in November, losing only to Kotoōshū on Day 11. He also finished as the wrestler with the most wins in the calendar year for the sixth consecutive time, a record. His victory was also his sixth straight Kyushu tournament triumph, the best run since Chiyonofuji's record eight in a row from 1981 to 1988.

=== 2013 ===
Hakuhō finished joint runner up on 12–3 in the opening tournament of 2013, giving up a kinboshi to Myōgiryū on Day 3 and also losing to Kotoōshū and Harumafuji. However he captured his 24th title in the Haru basho in March, remaining undefeated for the whole fifteen days. This was his first zenshō-yūshō since his record winning streak of 2010 and also the ninth of his career, breaking the all-time record he had shared with Taihō and Futabayama. It also drew him level with Kitanoumi in fourth place on the list of most career championships, behind only Asashōryū with 25, Chiyonofuji with 31 and Taihō with 32. Hakuhō also recorded his 650th win in the top division in this tournament, moving him into eighth place all-time. In the May tournament he won his 25th championship, equaling Asashōryū's mark. By again recording an undefeated tournament record, his final two victories coming over Kisenosato and Harumafuji, he increased his winning streak to 30 bouts.

Hakuhō extended his streak to 43 bouts by winning his first 13 matches in the Nagoya tournament in July, assuring himself of his 26th tournament victory with two days to spare. He was finally defeated by Kisenosato on Day 14, and also lost to Harumafuji on the final day. He won his fourth tournament in a row, and the 27th of his career, in the Aki basho in September, losing only one bout to Gōeidō. In November he went into a final day showdown with his fellow yokozuna Harumafuji, with both men tied on 13–1. Harumafuji won this bout to claim his sixth championship, with Hakuhō having to settle for his 17th second-place result. He finished the year with 82 wins out of 90 bouts, a record that has only been bettered by himself (twice) and Asashōryū.

=== 2014 ===
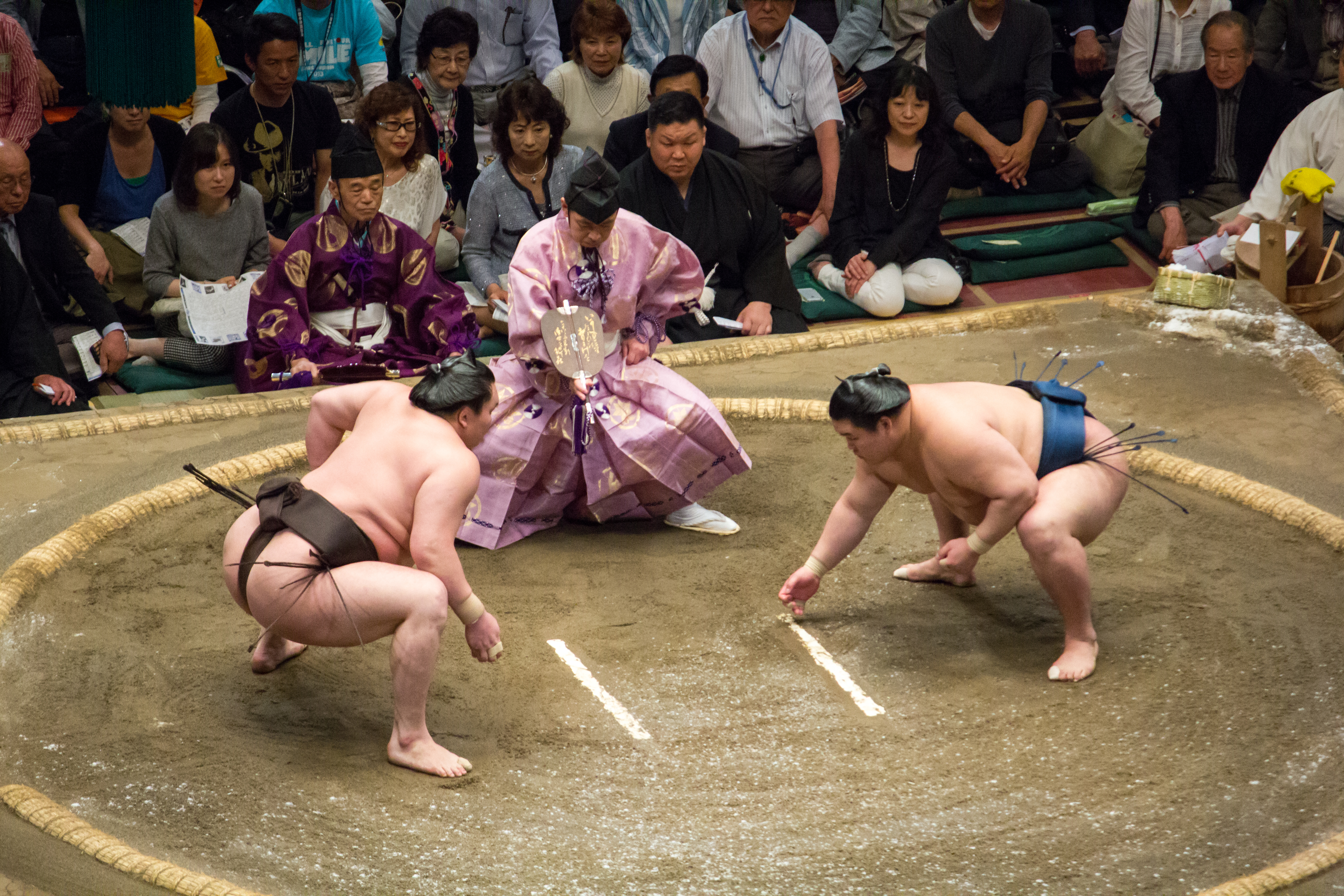
Hakuhō (left) about to begin his match with Gōeidō, May 2014

Hakuhō won the first tournament of 2014. After going undefeated in his first 14 matches, Hakuhō lost to Kakuryū on the final day. As Kakuryū had a 14–1 record, this prompted the two to again meet in a tie-breaking bout. After losing 20 minutes prior, Hakuhō won his twenty-eighth yūshō by defeating Kakuryū in this tie breaker.

In the March tournament, Hakuhō was bested by Kakuryū and finished runner-up, tied with Gōeidō at 12–3. He returned in May to win his twenty-ninth yūshō with a record of 14–1, only losing once to Gōeidō. He then won his thirtieth yūshō with a 13–2 record in July, becoming only the third man in history to have 30 or more top division championships.

On Day 14 of the September tournament, he defeated the up-and-coming Ichinojō, who he was tied with at 12–1. The following day, Hakuhō clinched the championship, winning his third tournament in a row, and the 31st of his career, having lost only one bout, to Gōeidō. It also drew him level with Chiyonofuji in second place on the list of most career championships.

In the next tournament in Fukuoka, he continued his dominance, again losing only one bout (against Takayasu on day six) and taking the championship to tie him with Taihō for the most championships in sumo history, defeating fellow yokozuna Kakuryū with a yorikiri push-out, for a 14–1 record and his 32nd Emperor's Cup. Hakuhō finally was able to fulfill a promise he had made during a visit to Taihō just two days before his death in January 2013 and equal the record, which had stood for over 40 years. After an emotional presentation ceremony Hakuhō remarked, "I could achieve this accomplishment because the soul of the Japanese and the god of sumo gave a mandate to my efforts".

=== 2015 ===
Hakuhō broke Taihō's record in the opening tournament of 2015, clinching the championship on the 13th day by defeating Kisenosato, and maintaining a perfect score into the final days. Hakuhō finished the tournament with a perfect score of 15–0 while all contenders had at least four losses. Sumo Association chairman Kitanoumi commented, "Nobody can touch Hakuho... I’d like to see him go for 40 titles. If he keeps going the way he is, that’s a possibility." He was however criticized for turning up an hour late to his press conference the next day, having reportedly been out drinking until 7am celebrating his victory.

In Osaka in March Hakuhō won his sixth consecutive championship, a feat only achieved four times previously (twice by Taihō, once by Asashōryū and once by himself). His 36 bout winning streak was brought to an end by Terunofuji on Day 13, but he won all his other matches to finish one ahead of Terunofuji on 14–1. During this tournament he also overtook Chiyonofuji to move into second place on the all-time list of most wins in the top division, behind only Kaiō. In May he lost on the opening day of a tournament for the first time in three years, to Ichinojo. He ended up finishing runner-up to Terunofuji on 11–4, thus ending his hopes of equalling his and Asashōryū's record of seven straight championships. However, he won his 35th title in Nagoya in July, finishing two wins ahead of the rest of the field on 14–1.

In September Hakuhō lost to Okinoumi and Yoshikaze on the first two days, and then announced that he would miss the rest of the tournament owing to an injury which was diagnosed as tendinitis in the left quadriceps. After withdrawing from a tournament for the first time since 2006 Hakuhō said "I couldn’t get any power. I apologize to everyone. I can’t step into the ring with half-hearted feelings". His withdrawal brought to an end his run of 722 consecutive matchdays competing as a yokozuna and 51 consecutive tournaments with a score of 10–5 or better, both records. On his return in November he appeared to be in dominant form and won his first twelve matches, but defeats in the last three days to Harumafuji, Terunofuji and Kakuryū saw him end the tournament in a three-way tie for second place. His most unusual win came on day 10 when he used the rarely-seen nekodamashi ("cat trick") technique to defeat Tochiōzan.

=== 2016 ===
In January 2016 Hakuhō won his first ten matches but then lost to Kotoshōgiku, the eventual winner of the tournament, on Day 11. He also lost his last two bouts to Kisenosato and Harumafuji to end with a 12–3 record and a tie for second place. This result meant he had gone three tournaments without winning the championship for the first time since 2012. In March he lost to Takarafuji on the first day, but won his remaining fourteen matches to take his 36th championship. His win was poorly received as he employed a henka (sidestep at the initial charge) to defeat Harumafuji on the final day and clinch the title. Speaking after the match Hakuhō said that he had never planned to win with a henka "and I feel really bad about that."

On the opening day of the May tournament in Tokyo he equalled Kaiō's record of 879 top division wins, and surpassed it the next day by gaining revenge over Takarafuji who had defeated him in the previous tournament. He secured his 37th championship on the fourteenth day when his only challenger Kisenosato fell to his second loss, and he rounded off the tournament by defeating Kakuryū with a rare backward pivot throw (utchari) to ensure a 29th consecutive victory and a perfect 15–0 record. His winning streak of 33 bouts was brought to an end on the 5th day of the July 2016 tournament when he lost once again to Takarafuji. He finished the tournament with a mediocre 10–5 record, hampered by an injury to his right big toe. He struggled to recover from his injuries and on 8 September he announced that he would miss the whole of the upcoming tournament explaining "I’m sorry to the fans. I want to work on healing in time for the autumn regional tour and the Kyushu Basho".

After undergoing surgery on his toe injury Hakuhō returned to action at the November tournament. On the third day he became only the third wrestler, after Chiyonofuji and Kaiō, to reach 1000 career wins. Afterwards he admitted to nerves having fallen short of his target with a 10–5 record in July and then having to sit out the September tournament, and expressed relief that he was "finally able to do it." Hakuhō went on to get an 11–4 record in November.

=== 2017 ===
In the opening tournament of 2017 Hakuhō lost on Day 8 to maegashira Arawashi (a rare example of him losing to a wrestler he had never fought before) and komusubi Takayasu on Day 9. After being defeated on the last two days by Takanoiwa and tournament winner Kisenosato, he finished in a share for third place. This marked the first time in Hakuhō's yokozuna career that he had gone four tournaments without winning the championship. He pulled out of the March tournament on the fifth day because of toe and thigh injuries.

The May 2017 tournament saw Hakuhō ranked as a yokozuna on the banzuke for the 59th time, putting him level with Chiyonofuji in second place on the all-time list. He won the summer tournament or Natsu Basho, with a zenshō, a perfect 15–0 score. Hakuhō entered the July tournament in Nagoya with two long-standing records in view: he needed nine wins to equal Chiyonofuji's career mark of 1045 and eleven to match Kaiō's all-time record of 1047. His task was made somewhat less challenging when Kakuryū, Kisenosato and Terunofuji withdrew with injuries in the first week. He drew level with Chiyonofuji with a win over Kagayaki on day nine and moved ahead of the late yokozuna by beating Chiyoshoma (a pupil of Chiyonofuji) on the following day. After an upset loss to Mitakeumi on day 11 he recovered to beat Tamawashi and Takayasu to break Kaiō's all-time record. He entered the final day one win ahead of the maegashira 8 Aoiyama and clinched his 39th title with a win over Harumafuji. After receiving his trophy he said "I lost on the 11th day, but the way I turned back the tide after that was in my head so I was able to get on the ring relaxed today. To be able to break Kaio's 1,047 record and Chiyonofuji's 1,045 mark at the same tournament is gratifying. I'd like to go back to my hometown and rest up tomorrow but the thing in my head right now is 1,000 wins in makuuchi."

Hakuhō missed the September 2017 tournament because of a knee injury, meaning three yokozuna were absent from the start of a tournament for the first time since the beginning of the Shōwa era. He said at an exhibition in October that he would like to continue wrestling until the 2020 Summer Olympics which will be held in Tokyo. He returned in November to win the tournament with a 14–1 record. He was the only yokozuna to complete the tournament and secured the yūshō on the fourteenth day when his only challengers, maegashira Hokutofuji and Okinoumi, both lost. Hakuhō's only defeat was to Yoshikaze on Day 11, after which he appealed to the ringside judges to declare the match a false start and initially refused to climb back on the dohyō and accept the loss. Following his 40th career championship Hakuhō commented on his fellow Mongolians Harumafuji and Takanoiwa, who were both absent from the tournament after Harumafuji assaulted Takanoiwa during drinks with other wrestlers in Tottori the previous month, saying "I want Harumafuji and Takanoiwa back in the dohyō." Hakuhō, who was present at the alleged assault, promised to investigators to "tell them exactly what I saw." On 20 December 2017 the Sumo Association announced that he was being docked all of his salary for January 2018, and half for February, for failing to act when Takanoiwa was attacked. Fellow yokozuna Kakuryū was docked just his January pay. The chairman of the Yokozuna Deliberation Council said, "Hakuho and Kakuryu were not able to stop the incident from happening and being taken too far. Their responsibility should not be taken lightly. They should be given a strong warning."

=== 2018 ===
Hakuhō pulled out of the January 2018 tournament on Day 5 after injuring his left big toe in a defeat to Yoshikaze the previous day. He also lost to Hokutofuji on Day 3, the first time he has lost to maegashira ranked wrestlers on consecutive days since his promotion to yokozuna. He was ranked as a yokozuna for the 64th time on the March 2018 banzuke, breaking the previous record of 63 tournaments as a yokozuna held by Kitanoumi. However, his stablemaster announced that he would sit out the tournament because ligament damage in the left big toe required three weeks of recovery time. On 9 April 2018 his father Jigjidiin Mönkhbat died. He returned to competition at the Natsu tournament in May, finishing with an 11–4 record.

He withdrew on Day 4 of the July tournament at the beginning of the day's bouts, due to a right knee injury.

On 22 September 2018, the 14th day of the Aki Basho, Hakuhō created history by winning his 41st Emperor's Cup and scoring his 1000th victory in sumo's top makuuchi division. The following day he completed the tournament undefeated, the 14th time he had achieved a zensho-yusho, extending his own record. His victory also meant he had won at least one top division championship for 13 consecutive years, beating the previous record of 12 held by Taihō.

He withdrew from the regional tour following the September tournament because of a recurrence of his right knee injury and underwent surgery on 18 October. He confirmed on 8 November that he was withdrawing from the November tournament because of persistent pain in the knee. This is the first year since 2006 that he has won only one tournament in a calendar year.

=== 2019 ===
Hakuhō won his first ten matches in January 2019, but then lost three in a row to Mitakeumi, Tamawashi and Takakeishō. He withdrew from the tournament on Day 14, with his stablemaster revealing that Hakuhō injured his right knee on Day 4 and his left ankle on Day 5. It was his 11th career withdrawal, and his fifth in the last seven tournaments.

At the March 2019 tournament, which was the last in the Heisei era, Hakuhō won his 42nd top division yūshō with a perfect 15–0 record, his 15th zenshō-yūshō of his career. He sealed his perfect record with a hard-fought shitatenage victory over Kakuryū on the final day. Interviewed after his triumph he said "I entered sumo at the tournament in Osaka, and now I’m here as we ring out the end of the Heisei era, so Osaka has a special place in my heart. I am a creature of this era. Nine years ago in Nagoya, I received a letter from the emperor. This Heisei era means everything to me." Despite appearing to be in pain from an arm injury he then led the crowd in a tejime, a clapping ceremony to mark the end of the era. This was seen as a breach of etiquette as the tournament ceremonies had not yet concluded, and after criticism by the Yokozuna Deliberation Council Hakuhō and his stablemaster apologized to the Sumo Association. Hakuho was issued an official reprimand by the Sumo Association the following month for his actions.

Hakuhō revealed on 31 March that the injury suffered in the March tournament was a muscle tear in his upper right arm, and that he had opted for rest rather than surgery. He only performed the yokozuna dohyo-iri ceremony during the spring tour, and on 9 May his stablemaster confirmed that he would be sitting out the Natsu tournament as he had only begun basic training routines. He resumed full training at the beginning of June, and shortly before the Nagoya tournament declared himself fit to enter.

In the July tournament Hakuhō was defeated by Ichinojō and Kotoshōgiku but still had a chance to force a playoff on the final day against Kakuryū, who led him 13–1 to 12–2 on the leaderboard. However Kakuryū won the match, his third victory over Hakuhō in their last five meetings, and Hakuhō finished as runner-up alongside maegashira Terutsuyoshi. It was his first runner-up performance since January 2016. He withdrew from the September 2019 tournament on the second day with a fractured finger. He returned in November 2019 and won the tournament with a 14–1 record, three wins ahead of the rest of the field. He told reporters after the tournament that he had feared he might never win another title, as his doctor had warned his March arm injury might never completely heal. He also said he was aiming for 50 championships before retiring.

In December Hakuhō was nominated by Sumida, one of Tokyo's wards, to be a torchbearer for the 2020 Olympics.

=== 2020 ===
Hakuhō withdrew from Day 4 of the January 2020 tournament, with his stablemaster citing a fever and inflammation of his lower back. He had suffered consecutive defeats to maegashira Endō and Myōgiryū. Having pulled out of four tournaments in 2018 and three in 2019, he had not completed two tournaments in a row since May and July 2017.

At the March 2020 tournament, Hakuhō won his 44th top division yūshō with a 13–2 record. On the last day he faced fellow yokozuna Kakuryū with both having a 12–2 score, the first time in seven years that two yokozuna had faced each other in the final match of the tournament with an identical record. His victory took place in a virtually empty arena due to the COVID-19 pandemic, the first time since 1945 that a tournament had been held without paying spectators.

Hakuho withdrew from the July tournament due to an injury sustained to his right knee late in the tournament; he subsequently had endoscopic surgery on the knee and missed both the September and November tournaments as a result, the first time since his debut that he had missed two consecutive tournaments.

Following the November 2020 basho, Hakuhō - along with fellow yokozuna Kakuryū - were issued warnings by the Sumo Association's Yokozuna Deliberation Council due to lack of participation in recent sumo tournaments. This is the middle of three notices that the council can issue between a letter of encouragement and a recommendation for retirement. It is the first time in history that warning notices have been issued.

=== 2021 ===
The Sumo Association announced on 5 January 2021 that Hakuhō tested positive for COVID-19. He had reported a loss of the sense of smell the day before. The news broke with just five days until the scheduled start of the January 2021 Tournament. Therefore he was absent from the tournament. Hakuhō left hospital on 14 January to continue his recovery at home. The whole of the Miyagino stable also sat out the tournament.

Upon the release of the March 2021 banzuke Hakuhō became the first wrestler to spend 100 straight tournaments in makuuchi from his top division debut (without ever falling to jūryō).

After winning his first two bouts of the March tournament, Hakuhō withdrew after doctors informed him that he needed surgery on his right kneecap requiring approximately two months of rehabilitation, meaning that Hakuhō would miss the May 2021 basho. Miyagino Oyakata said that Hakuhō would decide whether or not to continue competing based on his results in the July tournament. He underwent endoscopic surgery on 19 March. This was the same knee that had also been operated on in August of the previous year.

On 29 March, the Yokozuna Deliberation Council upheld the warning that was first issued to Hakuhō following the November 2020 tournament. The council announced it would revisit the issue at the end of the July 2021 tournament, which Hakuho referred to as "make or break" for his continued participation in active competition.

Following the retirement of Kakuryū, Hakuho was the sole yokozuna listed on the May 2021 banzuke. This marked the first time since September 2012 that there was only one active yokozuna, and uniquely, Hakuhō was also the sole yokozuna on that occasion. He formally withdrew from the May tournament on 7 May, due to his knee surgery, making it the sixth straight tournament he would fail to complete.

Mounting a comeback in July 2021, Hakuhō went undefeated for the first 14 days of the competition and faced ōzeki Terunofuji, who was also undefeated and vying for yokozuna promotion, in the final match of the tournament. Hakuhō defeated Terunofuji with an armlock throw (kotenage) to win his 45th top division championship and secure his 16th zenshō. Hakuhō expressed relief after the match, saying that he did not expect to win the basho with a perfect record at his age. His yūshō win at the age of 36 years and four months surpassed that of fellow yokozuna Chiyonofuji, who won his final championship at 35 years and five months. Speaking to reporters the next day, Hakuhō said, "The prospect for retirement was looming large, right before me, so I fired myself up more than before."

Hakuhō did not take part in practice sessions for the September 2021 tournament and gave no indication that he was ready to compete. In the event he was withdrawn from the tournament along with the rest of Miyagino stable after two wrestlers tested positive for COVID-19. It was the second time in 2021 that the stable had to withdraw from a basho because of a coronavirus outbreak.

== Retirement ==
Reports emerged after the September 2021 tournament that Hakuhō intended to retire, with his long-standing knee injuries leading him to believe he could no longer complete a 15 day tournament. Japan Sumo Association board member Shibatayama confirmed that Hakuhō's retirement papers had been received on 27 September, and that a meeting would be scheduled to approve Hakuhō's acquisition of the Magaki elder stock, which Hakuhō had discussed his hopes to acquire back in March 2021. In April 2021 a committee outside of the Sumo Association had declared that the ichidai-toshiyori system, in which exceptional yokozuna are given special one-generation elder status and allowed them to keep their shikona after retirement, did not in fact exist. This was controversial as it was seen to be aimed at Hakuhō, who would have been the first wrestler since Takanohana in 2003 to be given the honour.

The Sumo Association's Board of Directors officially finalized Hakuhō's retirement on 30 September. Unusually, before approving Hakuhō's acquisition of the Magaki stock the Sumo Association required him to sign a pledge that he would carry out the duties of an elder and that he would not act in ways that went against the "spirit of the way of sumo." At a press conference held the following day, Hakuhō told reporters that he was filled with a sense of relief. He said that he had made the decision to retire after achieving double-digit wins at the July tournament in Nagoya, and waited for the right time because of several factors, including Terunofuji's promotion to yokozuna, the Tokyo Olympic and Paralympic Games, and the COVID-19 outbreak that prevented his stable from competing in the September basho. He was assigned to the Guidance and Promotion Department of the Sumo Association, until the division of duties was decided again in February 2022. When the banzuke for the November 2021 tournament in Fukuoaka was released, there were only 41 wrestlers in the top division instead of the usual 42. Hakuhō's retirement announcement on September 30 had come after the banzuke committee meeting to draw up the new rankings, but an extra wrestler from jūryō was not promoted and instead Hakuhō's name was effectively blanked out from the yokozuna spot he would have occupied. Hakuhō was seen at this tournament in the Sumo Association's blue security uniform, as it is customary for new oyakata to start out as a tournament security guard. Hakuhō's danpatsu-shiki (retirement ceremony) was held at the Ryōgoku Kokugikan on 28 January 2023. Billed as "The Retirement Ceremony of Hakuho Sho and the Succession of the Name Miyagino" (白鵬引退宮城野襲名披露) when it was announced in September 2022, Hakuhō viewed the ceremony as repaying the fans that had supported him ever since his retirement. Accompanied by ōzeki Takakeishō and sekiwake Hōshōryū, serving as the tachimochi (sword bearer) and tsuyuharai (dew sweeper) respectively, Hakuhō performed his last yokozuna dohyō-iri, or ring entering ceremony. About 300 people took turns to cut the ōichōmage bun, with former Miyagino stablemaster Chikubayama making the final cut. The ceremony was also marked by the performance of a sanbasō (三番叟), a ceremonial dance for good omens, by the leading actor of kabuki's Naritaya house, Ichikawa Danjūrō XIII. Prior to the ceremony, there had been speculation that Hakuhō was intending to open a stable of his own in Tokyo, but he decided to remain at Miyagino stable.

== Career as stablemaster ==
On 28 July 2022 the Japan Sumo Association announced that he had inherited the Miyagino elder stock and would become the head coach of the stable, as the then Miyagino-oyakata (former Chikubayama) would reach the mandatory retirement age of 65 in August 2022. The two swapped elder names, with the former Miyagino becoming Magaki-oyakata and staying on as a consultant. Hakuhō had already recruited several wrestlers himself while still an active wrestler, including former maegashira Daikihō, popular lightweight Enhō and Ishiura, and the 2 m (6 ft 6 1/2 in) tall Mongolian-born Hokuseihō. Miyagino continued to recruit high-potential wrestlers, particularly in amateur circles. In September 2022, former amateur-yokozuna Kihō became the first wrestler recruited by Hakuhō since taking over the Miyagino name. In December of the same year, Miyagino recruited one of the stars of amateur competitions, two-time high school titleholder and corporate champion Hakuōhō. Nicknamed 'Reiwa Monster', Hakuōhō achieved record-breaking promotions and achievements in the space of just 7 months since his official debut as a professional wrestler. With Tenshōhō's promotion to jūryō after the July 2023 tournament, Miyagino successfully raised three new sekitori after only a little over a year at the head of his stable. At a career conference in September 2023, Miyagino made no secret of his hopes to train two yokozuna himself during his coaching career.

=== Hokuseihō's violence scandal and Miyagino stable's closure ===
In February 2024, it was announced by the Sumo Association that Hokuseihō, the protégé of Hakuhō, had assaulted several stablemates and that an investigation had been launched after one of them made a formal complaint to the association. Hakuhō was summoned to inform him that disciplinary proceedings had been launched against both of them, risking a salary deduction and a demotion in the toshiyori hierarchy (the elders in charge of running the association). On 23 February, the Sumo Association met and accepted their Compliance Committee's report. The board accepted the resignation of Hokuseihō, who had submitted his retirement papers the previous day. Hakuhō told reporters after the board meeting "I'm so sorry for causing concern to the sumo association, fans and those who support me."

Disciplinary decisions also targeted Hakuhō, because the Sumo Association found that he had learned about an assault committed by Hokuseihō that took place during the July 2020 tournament, but did not confirm the incident with either party involved nor report it to the association. Hakuhō was demoted from iin (committee member) to the lowest ranking of toshiyori (elder) and received a salary cut of 20 percent for three months. In the comments to the report submitted to the association, the auditors wrote that had he acted as a stablemaster, it could have possibly prevented the further acts of violence that later occurred over the span of a year. The Sumo Association commented after the affair that more serious disciplinary sanctions could be applied in the event of a new scandal; with spokesman Shibatayama (the 62nd yokozuna Ōnokuni) telling reporters that a suggestion had been made at the Compliance Committee meeting to remove Hakuhō from the association entirely.

Following publication of the association's investigation, the association decided to apply additional disciplinary sanctions with Hakuhō effectively removed as stablemaster of Miyagino stable in all but name for an indefinite period; the Sumo Association commenting at the time that he "lacks a great deal of knowledge and awareness as a master." In practice, the board decision led to the temporary appointment of Tamagaki (the former Tomonohana), a member of the Isegahama ichimon, to supervise Miyagino stable during the March 2024 tournament. After that tournament, the Sumo Association formally announced the closure of Miyagino stable and the transfer of all the wrestlers and coaches (including Hakuhō) to Isegahama stable.

After the scandal, Hakuhō visited the families of all of his wrestlers to apologize to them and to alleviate their concerns, something he had been advised to do after a meeting with Isegahama on 3 April. He reported that the families had shown signs of encouragement towards him. During the May tournament, his actions within Isegahama stable received positive feedback, particularly with regard to his commitment during the training sessions, in which he took part fighting against the stable's sekitori. In particular, his training against Takarafuji received positive comments, the latter having been one of the leading wrestlers during the first half of the tournament.

In early 2025, with the organization of his eponymous amateur tournament (the Hakuhō Cup) confirmed, it was interpreted by the press that staging the event could be a first step towards Miyagino's rehabilitation, since holding the event at Ryōgoku Kokugikan required the green light from the Japan Sumo Association and Miyagino's guardian, stablemaster Isegahama (the former Asahifuji).

=== Resignation ===
In April 2025 both Miyagino and Isegahama denied reports from multiple Japanese tabloids, including Shūkan Bunshun and Shūkan Shinchō, that Miyagino was planning to fully retire from sumo after the May 2025 tournament.

Although Miyagino again denied the reports when asked, upon the conclusion of that tournament, the daily sports newspaper Sports Nippon published an article on May 29 stating that Miyagino had indeed submitted a resignation request, but that it had not been immediately taken into account by the board of directors. His decision would date back to the March 2025 tournament, where he would have already announced his decision to make it official in the spring. According to reports, Miyagino had numerous exchanges with Asakayama (the former Kaiō), board director for the Isegahama clan, and with Isegahama himself, who sought to dissuade him from resigning.

On the same day as the Sports Nippon article, the Sumo Association declared at an ordinary meeting of its board that the question of allowing Miyagino to be released from his punishment would be discussed at an extraordinary meeting, the date of which was set on 2 June to coincide with the definitive retirement of Isegahama (the former yokozuna Asahifuji). Still according to Sports Nippon, Miyagino had already made arrangements with his backers and sponsors, however, refusing to admit his resignation publicly to avoid overshadowing Ōnosato's promotion to yokozuna which took place during the same period.

Among the reasons cited by Sports Nippon's sources to explain Miyagino's resignation, was the likelihood that he would remain under the tutelage of Isegahama stable after the retirement of stablemaster Isegahama (the former yokozuna Asahifuji) and under the authority of his successor, Terunofuji, who is Miyagino's junior in terms of both achievements and coaching career and with whom he does not have a good relationship. Other sources also reported on the uncertain status of the masters of the former Miyagino stable, who were apparently left in doubt as to the conditions for reopening the stable, with Asakayama declaring that the clan had been trying since early 2025 to reopen the stable, without success. Coaches from Miyagino stable were also subject to a ten-year ban on holding positions on the association's board of directors and on recruiting wrestlers while the stable remained closed.

On 2 June 2025 the Sumo Association unanimously decided that Miyagino's resignation would be considered as accepted on 9 June. It was reported that Miyagino would address the press on that day. Following the announcement, details were given on the fate of the wrestlers who were part of his former stable and on his elder stock. The Miyagino name should in fact be inherited by Isegahama (the former Asahifuji) in a context of re-employment after the mandatory age of 65 and in a context that should see him cede his stable and his Isegahama name to his pupil Terunofuji. According to the press conference, this choice is explained by Miyagino's desire to see his former apprentices supervised, as they should now belong permanently to the Isegahama stable.

On 9 June 2025, the date of his departure from the Sumo Association, Hakuhō held a press conference in which he expressed his desire to remain involved with the sport from the outside. "I want to develop sumo from an outside perspective," he said. "I want to share sumo's appeal with many people around the world, not just in Japan." He told reporters that he had struggled in his decision to quit sumo's governing body, considering the impact it would have on the wrestlers he had been training. He also told reporters when asked that he would have had "no problem at all" if he had worked under new Isegahama stablemaster Terunofuji.

== After professional sumo ==
It was reported after Hakuhō's departure from the Japan Sumo Association in June 2025 that Hakuhō owned a plot of land in Tokyo's Chuo ward, initially meant to be the home of a new Miyagino stable, that he would likely use for a building related to a new sumo-related company. The building would include a sumo ring on the ground floor that could be seen from the outside through glass walls. On 14 June Hakuhō announced the establishment of his new sumo promotion company, Hakuhō Dayan Sumo & Sports, named in part for Mongolian emperor Dayan Khan who reigned from 1480 until 1517. The company expects to receive support from long-time Hakuhō supporter and Toyota chairman Akio Toyoda, who was named to lead the amateur Japan Sumo Federation on the same day.

At the end of October 2025, it was announced that he would be one of the winners of the HEROs AWARD, alongside Megumi Ikeda. The prize is delivered by the Nippon Foundation and aimed at recognizing athletes who promote social action through sport for his work with children's sumo wrestling. During the ceremony, he praised the success of his Hakuhō Cup tournament, noting that both current yokozuna (Ōnosato and Hōshōryū) were former participants, and reiterated his goal of making sumo an Olympic sport by promoting women's participation in the sport.

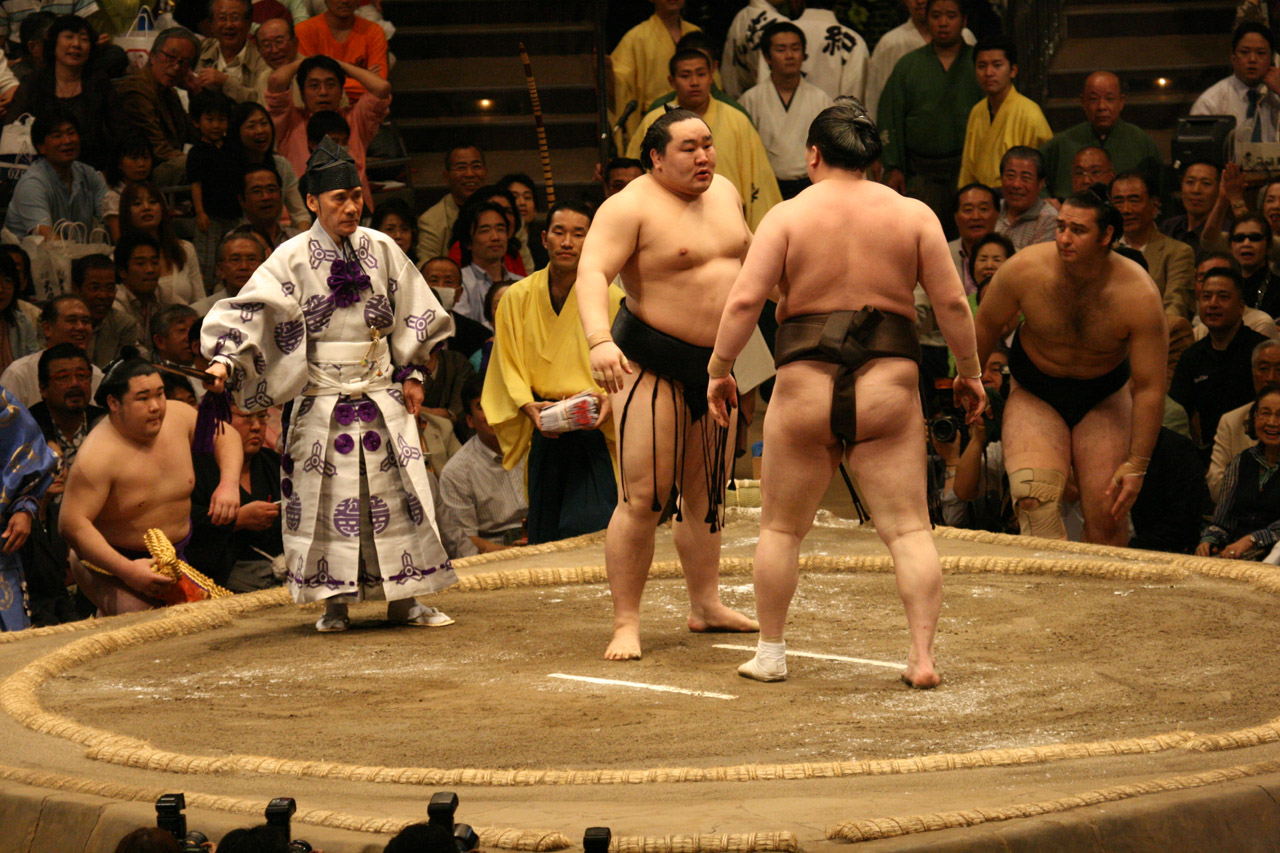
The rivalry between Hakuhō and Asashōryū and their heated confrontation was the subject of one of the first YouTube videos on Hakuhō's official channel.

On March 11, 2026, Hakuhō launched his own YouTube channel called Hakuho_Official. Among the videos, he conducted an interview with Asashōryū, looking back on their rivalry and their famous match that ended in a stand-off. In late May 2026, Hakuhō made a public appearance at the retirement ceremony for Kiriyama (former sekiwake Takarafuji). This appearance, three days after the association had definitively confirmed the closure of Miyagino stable and one month after his former disciple Enhō had regained his sekitori status, drew numerous questions, to which Hakuhō offered only evasive answers.

=== Involvement within the International Sumo Federation ===
In September 2025 Hakuhō was named as an advisor for the International Sumo Federation. In October 2026, he succeeded Akio Toyoda as head of the federation, reiterating his desire to develop the sport on an international and Olympic level.

== Fighting style ==
Hakuhō had a straightforward but effective style, reminiscent of yokozuna Takanohana. He has been called the "quintessential all-round sumo wrestler" because of his strength in both grappling and pushing techniques, and his ability to read and respond to his opponent's intentions. However, he said he did not have a special or favourite kimarite, and that "the only thing I am very good at is yorikiri (force-out)". This technique, the most common kimarite in sumo, was used by Hakuhō to win 28% of his matches. He favoured the migi-yotsu position, meaning his right hand was inside and his left hand outside his opponent's arms, and he became famous for his left hand outside grip. He also regularly employed uwate-nage, or overarm throw. While meeting foreign journalists in April 2009, Hakuhō said he was studying the techniques of the 35th yokozuna Futabayama, a wrestler whom he greatly admires, in particular his go-no-sen approach to the tachi-ai or initial charge. He also tried to use Wakanohana I's trademark move of yobimodoshi, or pulling body slam, in his own bouts.

Hakuhō was criticized for giving his opponents an unnecessary final shove after the bout was already over (dameoshi). He did this on Day 4 of the March 2016 tournament in his win over Okinoumi and again on Day 8, when he sent Yoshikaze crashing into the ring side judge Izutzu Oyakata, fracturing Izutzu's left femur and putting him out of action for three months. Hakuhō was warned by the head of the judging committee, Isegahama Oyakata, who said, "he has to understand completely that (such) redundant finishing blows are dangerous." Hakuhō apologized, calling his actions "inexcusable... Even I have weaknesses in the ring that I want to correct." Speaking after his tournament victory in May 2016 he commented, "I don’t know why but when I get into the ring, I turn into a different Hakuho. I think there are two Hakuhos. I'm gentler when I'm not in the ring."

The Yokozuna Deliberation Council criticized him in January 2018 for using slaps to the face (harite) and leading with the forearm and elbow (kachiage) at the tachi-ai; while both moves are technically legal, they are usually considered beneath the dignity of a yokozuna. Hakuhō continued to use these tactics, however, and was condemned once again by the Council after his championship-clinching win over Terunofuji in July 2021. Hakuho responded to criticism of his style in this match and in the previous day's win over Shōdai, in which he stood far back at the tachi-ai and kept his distance throughout the match, by saying he was trying to protect his weak right knee.

== Personal life ==
In February 2007 Hakuhō married Sayoko Wada, then 22 years old, a Japanese university student and glamour model, after a three-year relationship. The wedding ceremony took place at Meiji Shrine. The couple have four children.

In July 2017 he was reported to be considering taking Japanese citizenship, which is required to stay in the Japan Sumo Association as an elder after retirement. This would involve giving up Mongolian citizenship, which Hakuhō was reportedly reluctant to do while his father Jigjidiin Mönkhbat was still living. After Mönkhbat's death in April 2018 Hakuhō's mother denied that her husband had been opposed to the idea and said she felt Hakuhō's change in nationality was inevitable. It was reported in April 2019 that Hakuhō had begun the process by applying for renunciation of his Mongolian citizenship, and he announced in September 2019 that he had acquired Japanese citizenship. He chose to change his legal name to his shikona, Hakuhō Shō.

== Other activities ==
Since 2010 Hakuhō has hosted the Hakuhō Cup, an annual amateur sumo event for elementary to middle school children, from both inside and outside Japan, and held at the Ryōgoku Kokugikan. In January 2024 he also announced that he would be the sponsor of the first Dream Girls Cup, a sumo competition open to girls from first grade of elementary school to third grade of high school. The tournament, held in February, is also promoted by Shōko Kanazawa and aims to promote women's sumo.

== List of records ==
On 4 December 2021 Hakuhō was recognized by Guinness World Records for the following records:

- Most top division championships: 45
- Most career wins: 1187
- Most top division wins: 1093
- Most undefeated championships: 16
- Most tournaments ranked as yokozuna: 84

Hakuhō also holds a number of other records, such as most wins as yokozuna (899), most consecutive wins in the 6 tournaments per year era (63, absolute record is 69) and most wins in a calendar year (86, achieved twice). In October 2022, he set the Guinness World Record for creating 104 tegata hand prints in one minute.

== Career record ==
Hakuhō Shō
Year	January Hatsu basho, Tokyo	March Haru basho, Osaka	May Natsu basho, Tokyo	July Nagoya basho, Nagoya	September Aki basho, Tokyo	November Kyūshū basho, Fukuoka
2001	x	(Maezumo)	East Jonokuchi #16; 3–4	East Jonokuchi #18; 5–2	East Jonidan #97; 5–2	West Jonidan #55; 4–3
2002	East Jonidan #33; 5–2	East Sandanme #98; 6–1	East Sandanme #38; 4–3	West Sandanme #23; 3–4	West Sandanme #44; 4–3	West Sandanme #28; 4–3
2003	East Sandanme #16; 5–2	West Makushita #54; 4–3	West Makushita #44; 5–2	East Makushita #30; 4–3	East Makushita #23; 6–1	East Makushita #9; 6–1
2004	East Jūryō #12; 9–6	West Jūryō #8; 12–3–P; Champion	East Maegashira #16; 12–3; F	East Maegashira #8; 11–4	East Maegashira #3; 8–7	West Maegashira #1; 12–3; O★
2005	West Komusubi #1; 11–4; T	West Sekiwake #1; 8–7	East Sekiwake #1; 9–6	East Sekiwake #1; 6–3–6	West Maegashira #1; 9–6	West Komusubi #1; 9–6
2006	West Sekiwake #1; 13–2; O	East Sekiwake #1; 13–2–P; OT	West Ōzeki #3; 14–1–P	East Ōzeki #1; 13–2	East Ōzeki #1; 8–7	West Ōzeki #2; Sat out due to injury 0–0–15
2007	West Ōzeki #3; 10–5	West Ōzeki #1; 13–2–P	East Ōzeki #1; 15–0	West Yokozuna #1; 11–4	West Yokozuna #1; 13–2	East Yokozuna #1; 12–3
2008	East Yokozuna #1; 14–1	East Yokozuna #1; 12–3	West Yokozuna #1; 11–4	West Yokozuna #1; 15–0	East Yokozuna #1; 14–1	East Yokozuna #1; 13–2–P
2009	East Yokozuna #1; 14–1–P	West Yokozuna #1; 15–0	East Yokozuna #1; 14–1–P	East Yokozuna #1; 14–1	East Yokozuna #1; 14–1–P	West Yokozuna #1; 15–0
2010	East Yokozuna #1; 12–3	East Yokozuna #1; 15–0	East Yokozuna #1; 15–0	East Yokozuna #1; 15–0	East Yokozuna #1; 15–0	East Yokozuna #1; 14–1–P
2011	East Yokozuna #1; 14–1	East Yokozuna #1; Tournament Cancelled; Match fixing investigation 0–0–0	East Yokozuna #1; 13–2	East Yokozuna #1; 12–3	East Yokozuna #1; 13–2	East Yokozuna #1; 14–1
2012	East Yokozuna #1; 12–3	East Yokozuna #1; 13–2–P	East Yokozuna #1; 10–5	East Yokozuna #1; 14–1	East Yokozuna #1; 13–2	East Yokozuna #1; 14–1
2013	East Yokozuna #1; 12–3	West Yokozuna #1; 15–0	East Yokozuna #1; 15–0	East Yokozuna #1; 13–2	East Yokozuna #1; 14–1	East Yokozuna #1; 13–2
2014	West Yokozuna #1; 14–1–P	East Yokozuna #1; 12–3	East Yokozuna #1; 14–1	East Yokozuna #1; 13–2	East Yokozuna #1; 14–1	East Yokozuna #1; 14–1
2015	East Yokozuna #1; 15–0	East Yokozuna #1; 14–1	East Yokozuna #1; 11–4	East Yokozuna #1; 14–1	East Yokozuna #1; 0–3–12	West Yokozuna #1; 12–3
2016	West Yokozuna #1; 12–3	West Yokozuna #1; 14–1	East Yokozuna #1; 15–0	East Yokozuna #1; 10–5	West Yokozuna #1; Sat out due to injury 0–0–15	East Yokozuna #2; 11–4
2017	East Yokozuna #2; 11–4	East Yokozuna #1; 2–3–10	West Yokozuna #2; 15–0	East Yokozuna #1; 14–1	East Yokozuna #1; Sat out due to injury 0–0–15	West Yokozuna #1; 14–1
2018	East Yokozuna #1; 2–3–10	West Yokozuna #1; Sat out due to injury 0–0–15	West Yokozuna #1; 11–4	West Yokozuna #1; 3–1–11	West Yokozuna #1; 15–0	East Yokozuna #1; Sat out due to injury 0–0–15
2019	West Yokozuna #1; 10–4–1	East Yokozuna #1; 15–0	East Yokozuna #1; Sat out due to injury 0–0–15	West Yokozuna #1; 12–3	West Yokozuna #1; 0–2–13	West Yokozuna #1; 14–1
2020	East Yokozuna #1; 1–3–11	East Yokozuna #1; 13–2	East Yokozuna #1; Tournament Cancelled; State of Emergency; 0–0–0	East Yokozuna #1; 10–3–2	East Yokozuna #1; Sat out due to injury 0–0–15	East Yokozuna #1; Sat out due to injury 0–0–15
2021	East Yokozuna #1; Sat out due to COVID rules 0–0–15	East Yokozuna #1; 2–1–12	East Yokozuna #1; Sat out due to injury 0–0–15	East Yokozuna #1; 15–0	East Yokozuna #1; Sat out due to COVID rules 0–0–15	Retired –
Record given as wins–losses–absences Top division champion Top division runner-up Retired Lower divisions Non-participation Sanshō key: F=Fighting spirit; O=Outstanding performance; T=Technique Also shown: ★=Kinboshi; P=Playoff(s); Divisions: Makuuchi — Jūryō — Makushita — Sandanme — Jonidan — Jonokuchi Makuuchi ranks: Yokozuna — Ōzeki — Sekiwake — Komusubi — Maegashira

== See also ==
- Glossary of sumo terms
- List of past sumo wrestlers
- List of Mongolian sumo wrestlers
- List of non-Japanese sumo wrestlers
- List of sumo record holders
- List of sumo top division champions
- List of sumo top division runners-up
- List of sumo second division champions
- List of yokozuna

Preceded by Asashōryū Akinori	69th Yokozuna; 2007 – 2021	Succeeded by Harumafuji Kōhei
Yokozuna is not a successive rank, and more than one wrestler can hold the title at once
