= List of sumo record holders =

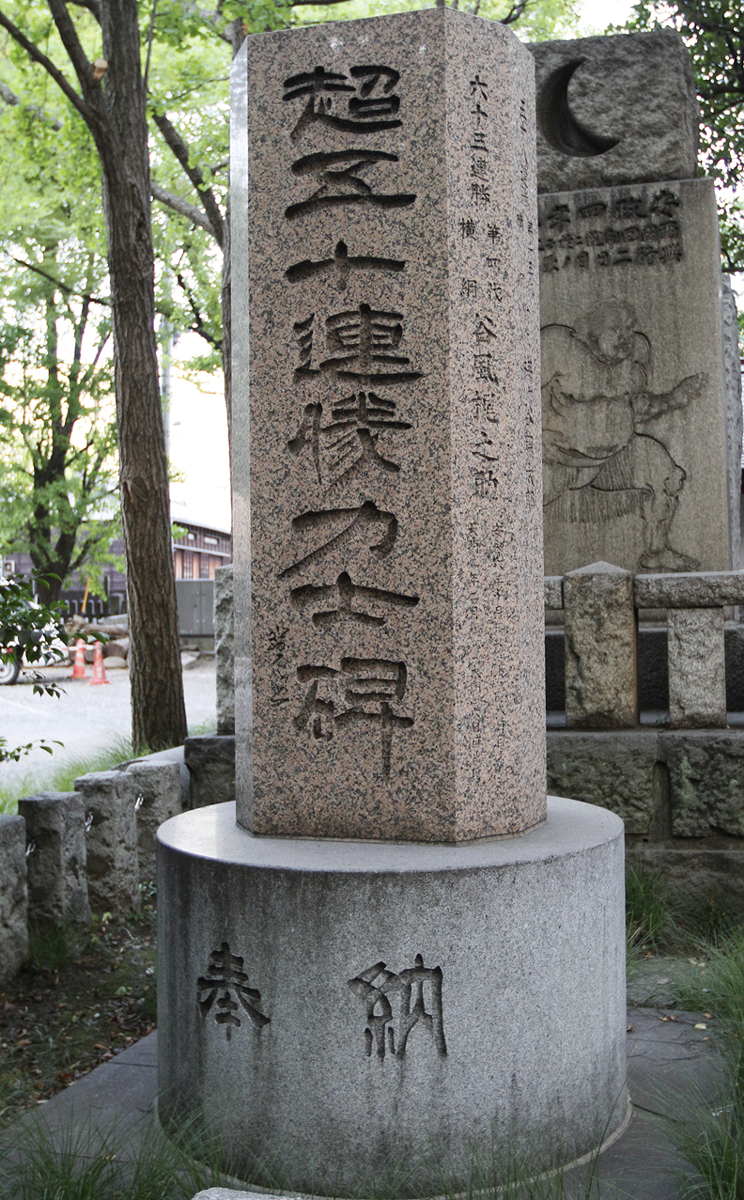
The Rikishi Monument for Over 50 Consecutive Wins at Tomioka Hachiman Shrine. As of November 2014, the monument carries the names of Tanikaze (63 consecutive wins), Umegatani (58), Tachiyama (56), Futabayama (69), Chiyonofuji (53) and Hakuhō (63).

This is a list of records held by wrestlers of professional sumo. Only performances in official tournaments or honbasho are included here. Since 1958, six honbasho have been held every year, giving wrestlers from the modern era more opportunities to accumulate championships and wins. Before this, tournaments were held less frequently; sometimes only once or twice per year.

Names in bold indicate a still active wrestler. Record streaks that are still ongoing are marked as 'current'.

The tables are up to date as of the end of the November 2026 tournament.

== Most top division championships ==
=== Most career championships ===
Official championships since 1909^{+}
	Name	Total	Years
1	Hakuhō	45	2006–2021
2	Taihō	32	1960–1971
3	Chiyonofuji	31	1981–1990
4	Asashōryū	25	2002–2010
5	Kitanoumi	24	1974–1984
6	Takanohana II	22	1992–2001
7	Wajima	14	1972–1980
8	Futabayama	12	1936–1943
8	Musashimaru	12	1994–2002
10	Akebono	11	1992–2000

^{+} Raiden is said to have had the best record in 28 tournaments between 1790 and 1810, Tanikaze 21 between 1772 and 1793, and Kashiwado 16 between 1812 and 1822. Tachiyama won two unofficial championships and nine official, giving him a total of 11.

=== Most undefeated championships ===
Zenshō-yūshō since 1949^{+}
	Name	Total	Years
1	Hakuhō	16	2007–2021
2	Futabayama	8	1936–1943
2	Taihō	8	1963–1969
4	Tachiyama	7	1910–1915
4	Kitanoumi	7	1977–1984
4	Chiyonofuji	7	1983–1989
7	Tochigiyama	6	1917–1925
8	Asashōryū	5	2004–2006
9	Haguroyama	4	1944–1952
9	Tsunenohana	4	1921–1928
9	Takanohana II	4	1994–1996

^{+} Tournaments have been consistently fifteen days long since May 1949. Before that date there were a number of different lengths, including ten, eleven, twelve, and thirteen days. The records of Tachiyama, Tochigiyama and Tsunenohana also include some draws, holds and rest days.

=== Most consecutive championships ===
Consecutive championships
	Name	Total	Years
1	Hakuhō	7^{+}	2010–2011
1	Asashōryū	7^{†}	2004–2005
3	Hakuhō	6	2014–2015
3	Taihō	6	1966–1967
3	Taihō	6	1962–1963
5	Futabayama	5^{‡}	1936–1938
5	Kitanoumi	5	1978
5	Chiyonofuji	5	1986–1987

^{+} Four of these titles were in perfect tournaments (zenshō-yūshō) and were part of Hakuhō's second-place streak of 63 consecutive wins.
^{†} Includes a sweep of all six tournaments in 2005. Asashōryū remains the only wrestler to have won all tournaments in a six-tournament calendar year (post-1949).
^{‡} All of Futabayama's victories in this streak were in perfect tournaments and were part of Futabayama's record setting 69 consecutive wins.
^{÷} Raiden is said to have had the best record in nine consecutive tournaments between 1806 and 1810.

=== Most championship playoffs ===
Most playoffs
	Name	Total	W	L
1	Hakuhō	10	6	4
1	Takanohana II	10	5	5
3	Kitanoumi	8	3	5
4	Akebono	7	4	3
4	Musashimaru	7	1	6
6	Chiyonofuji	6	6	0
6	Asashōryū	6	5	1
6	Taihō	6	4	2
6	Terunofuji	6	3	3
10	Hokutoumi	5	3	2
10	Takakeishō	5	2	3

== Most wins ==
Wins within a playoff are never included in any of the statistics concerning wins or win ratios.

=== Most career wins ===
	Name	Wins	Years	Highest rank
1	Hakuhō	1187	2001–2021	Yokozuna
2	Kaiō	1047	1988–2011	Ōzeki
3	Chiyonofuji	1045	1970–1991	Yokozuna
4	Ōshio	964	1962–1988	Komusubi
5	Kitanoumi	951	1967–1984	Yokozuna
6	Kyokutenhō	927	1992–2015	Sekiwake
7	**Tamawashi**	926	2004–**current**	Sekiwake
8	Wakanosato	914	1992–2015	Sekiwake
9	Aminishiki	907	1997–2019	Sekiwake
10	Taihō	872	1956–1971	Yokozuna

=== Most top division wins ===
	Name	Wins	Years	Highest rank
1	Hakuhō	1093	2004–2021	Yokozuna
2	Kaiō	879	1993–2011	Ōzeki
3	Chiyonofuji	807	1975–1991	Yokozuna
4	Kitanoumi	804	1972–1984	Yokozuna
5	Taihō	746	1960–1971	Yokozuna
6	**Tamawashi**	724	2008–**current**	Sekiwake
7	Kotoshōgiku	718	2005–2020	Ōzeki
8	Kisenosato	714	2004–2019	Yokozuna
9	Harumafuji	712	2004–2017	Yokozuna
10	Musashimaru	706	1991–2003	Yokozuna

=== Most wins in a calendar year ===
	Name	Wins	Year
1	Hakuhō	86 (Note: An additional 87th win was scored in a playoff.)	2010
1	Hakuhō	86 (Note: One of these 86 wins came by default. An additional two playoff bouts were both lost.)	2009
3	Asashōryū	84	2005
4	Hakuhō	82	2013
4	Kitanoumi	82 (Note: An additional 83rd and 84th win was scored in a playoff.)	1978
6	Hakuhō	81 (Note: An additional 82nd win was scored in a playoff.)	2014
6	Taihō	81	1963
8	Chiyonofuji	80	1985
8	Kitanoumi	80	1977
8	Takanohana II	80 (Note: An additional 81st win was scored in a playoff.)	1995
8	Takanohana II	80	1994

- The perfect score is 90 wins in a year, 15 wins per 6 tournaments each.
- A special trophy is awarded to each year's biggest cumulative winner.
- The most wins over any period of 6 tournaments are held by Hakuho, collecting 88 wins in regulation between March 2010 and January 2011. An additional 89th win was scored in a playoff.

=== Most consecutive wins ===
The table lists undefeated streaks in regular bouts. The streaks of Tanikaze, Umegatani, and Tachiyama were interrupted by draws and rest days as was common at that time. The streaks of Futabayama, Hakuho, Chiyonofuji and Taiho were all wins only. As this list contains records from different eras, duration of undefeated streaks varies considerably from months to years.

	Name	Wins	Start	End	Duration	Defeated by
1	Futabayama	69	January 1936	January 1939	3 years	Akinoumi
2	Tanikaze	63 (Note: 63 wins, 3 draws, 5 absence.)	March 1778	February 1782	3 years, 11 months	Onogawa
2	Hakuhō	63	January 2010	November 2010	9 months, 3 weeks	Kisenosato
4	Umegatani I	58 (Note: 58 wins, 12 draws, 25 absence.)	April 1876	January 1881	4 years, 9 months	Wakashima
5	Tachiyama	56 (Note: 56 wins, 2 draws, 1 absence.)	January 1912	May 1916	4 years, 4 months	Tochigiyama
6	Chiyonofuji	53	May 1988	November 1988	6 months, 3 weeks	Ōnokuni
7	Taihō	45	September 1968	March 1969	6 months	Haguroiwa
8	Raiden I	44	March 1797	October 1800	3 years, 7 months	Shachihoko
9	Hakuhō	43	March 2013	July 2013	4 months, 1 week	Kisenosato
9	Raiden II	43	c. 1870	(not recorded)	(not recorded)	(not recorded)
9	Tachiyama	43 (Note: 43 wins, 6 draws, 1 absence.)	June 1909	January 1912	2 years, 7 months	Nishinoumi II
9	Tanikaze	43 (Note: 43 wins, draws, absence.)	February 1782	November 1786	4 years, 9 months	Onogawa

=== Most consecutive wins from sumo debut ===
The table lists winning streaks in regular bouts. Wins and losses in a playoff (kettai-sen) are denoted as [+1|-1], no playoff participation as [+0]. Pre-sumo bouts (maezumo) are disregarded.

	Name	Wins	Start	End	Defeated by	Jūryō debut	Highest rank
1	Jōkōryū (Note: Jōkōryū lost the jonidan playoff to Watanabe in September 2011. Jōkōryū would nonetheless claim the championship in his makushita debut, winning three additional bouts in an eight-way playoff. Record achieved under the name "Sakumayama ".)	27 [+2|-1]	July 2011	January 2012	Senshō	May 2012	Komusubi
2	Itai	26 [+1]	November 1978	May 1979	Ōnishiki	September 1979	Komusubi
2	Tochiazuma II (Note: Tochiazuma's debut started with three absences, none of which resulted in default losses issued against him. Record achieved under the name "Shiga".)	26 [+3]	January 1995	September 1995	Dewaarashi	May 1996	Ōzeki
4	**Asahifuji** (Note: Asahifuji would nonetheless claim the championship in his makushita debut, winning three additional bouts in a seven-way playoff. Only the third in history to win four lower divisional championships from debut, following Miyabiyama winning four in 1998, and Haguroyama winning five in 1935.)	25 [+3]	January 2026	July 2026	Nabatame	November 2026	Jūryō 12
5	**Ōshōryū** (Note: Record achieved under the name "Motobayashi".)	24 [+2]	July 2019	January 2020	Kotodaigō	(not achieved)	Makushita 2
6	Tokitenkū	22 [+2]	September 2002	March 2003	Furuichi	March 2004	Komusubi
7	Kototenzan (Note: Kototenzan retired from sumo undefeated admidst disagreements with his elders. Record achieved under the name "Kototenta".)	21 [+1]	January 1986	July 1986	(retirement)	(not achieved)	Makushita 43
7	**Enhō**	21 [+2]	May 2017	November 2017	Jōkōryū	March 2018	Maegashira 4
7	Hokuseihō	21 [+0]	July 2020	March 2021	Tokihayate	September 2021	Maegashira 6
7	**Fujiseiun** (Note: Fujiseiun lost the jonidan playoff to Osanai in July 2021.)	21 [+1|-1]	May 2021	November 2021	Kamito	March 2023	Maegashira 2

== Best top division win ratios ==
=== All time ===
The list includes yokozuna and ōzeki (the highest rank before the yokozuna rank was introduced), but excludes so-called kanban or "guest ōzeki" (usually big men drawn from local crowds to promote a tournament who would never appear on the banzuke again) and wrestlers for which insufficient data is available.

	Name	Win–loss	Years	Rate
1	Raiden	254–10	1790–1811	96.2%
2	Umegatani I	116–6	1874–1885	95.1%
3	Tanikaze	258–14	1769–1794	94.9%
4	Jinmaku	87–5	1858–1867	94.6%
5	Onogawa	144–13	1781–1797	91.7%

=== Modern era ===
In 1927, the Tokyo Sumo Association merged with the Osaka Sumo Association to form the Japan Sumo Association, and most of the sumo systems were changed, so any pre-1927 records are disregarded. Losses by default are excluded, but wins by default are included; as is standard in sumo records.

	Name	Win–loss	Years	Rate
1	Hakuhō	1093–199	2001–2021	84.6%
2	Taihō	746–144	1960–1971	83.8%
3	Futabayama	276–68	1932–1945	80.2%
4	Asashōryū	596–153	2001–2010	79.6%
5	Haguroyama	321–94	1937–1953	77.3%
6	Kitanoumi	804–247	1972–1985	76.5%

- Among active wrestlers, Ōnosato achieved a career-high rate of 75.76%, 125 wins against 40 losses, after winning the September 2025 tournament.

== Most bouts ==
Losses by default are excluded.

=== Most career bouts ===
	Name	Total	Years	Highest rank
1	Ōshio	1891	1962–1988	Komusubi
2	Kyokutenhō	1870	1992–2015	Sekiwake
3	**Tamawashi**	1838	2004–**current**	Sekiwake
4	Aminishiki	1805	1997–2019	Sekiwake
5	Terao	1792	1979–2002	Sekiwake
6	Kaiō	1731	1988–2011	Ōzeki
7	Wakanosato	1691	1992–2015	Sekiwake
8	Takamiyama	1654	1964–1984	Sekiwake
9	**Sadanoumi**	1638	2003–**current**	Maegashira 1
10	Aobajō	1630	1964–1986	Sekiwake

=== Most top division bouts ===
	Name	Total	Years	Highest rank
1	**Tamawashi**	1512	2008–**current**	Sekiwake
2	Kyokutenhō	1470	1998–2015	Sekiwake
3	Kaiō	1444	1993–2011	Ōzeki
4	Takamiyama	1430	1968–1984	Sekiwake
5	Aminishiki	1399	2000–2018	Sekiwake
6	Terao	1378	1985–2001	Sekiwake
7	Kotoshōgiku	1332	2005–2020	Ōzeki
8	Akinoshima	1283	1988–2003	Sekiwake
9	Hakuhō	1282	2004–2021	Yokozuna
10	Kotonowaka	1260	1990–2005	Sekiwake

=== Most consecutive career bouts ===
	Name	Total	Years	Highest rank
1	**Tamawashi***	1838 (Note: Tamawashi was forced to withdraw from Day 13 of the July 2022 tournament under COVID-19 protocols. The Japan Sumo Association has said his streak should be recognized as continuing.)	2004–**current**	Sekiwake
2	Aobajō*	1630	1964–1986	Sekiwake
3	Fujizakura	1543	1963–1984	Sekiwake
4	Takatōriki*	1456	1983–2002	Sekiwake
5	Takamiyama	1425	1964–1981	Sekiwake
6	**Yoshiazuma***	1440 (Note: Yoshiazuma was forced to withdraw from the September 2020 tournament and Day 11 of the July 2022 tournament under COVID-19 protocols. However, this was not considered an interruption to his streak of consecutive appearances.)	1996–**current**	Maegashira 12
7	Takarafuji*	1398	2009–2025	Sekiwake
8	Dairyūgawa*	1367	1961–1979	Maegashira 1
9	Terao	1356	1979–1997	Sekiwake
10	Toyonoumi*	1316	1981–1999	Maegashira 1

* No bouts missed in career/career to date

=== Most consecutive top division bouts ===
	Name	Total	Years	Highest rank
1	Takamiyama	1231	1968–1981	Sekiwake
2	Ōzutsu	1170	1979–1992	Sekiwake
3	**Tamawashi**	1152	2013–2026	Sekiwake
4	Kurohimeyama	1065	1969–1981	Sekiwake
5	Terao	1063	1985–1997	Sekiwake
6	Hasegawa	1024	1965–1976	Sekiwake
7	Takarafuji	990	2013–2024	Sekiwake
8	Takatōriki	975	1990–2001	Sekiwake
9	Ōhikari	945	1950–1963	Komusubi
10	Aonosato	885	1959–1968	Sekiwake
10	Kaneshiro	885	1974–1984	Sekiwake

== Most tournaments ==
The March 2011 and May 2020 tournaments were cancelled for all wrestlers and are disregarded in these totals.
Tournaments sat out by individual wrestlers are included, with the exception of "outside the banzuke" status (banzuke-gai).

=== Most career tournaments ===
	Name	Total	First	Last	Highest rank
1	Hanakaze	214	March 1986	January 2022	Sandanme 18
2	**Tenichi**	201	March 1993	**current**	Makushita 10
2	**Terunosato**	201	March 1993	**current**	Sandanme 23
4	**Itakozakura**	195	March 1994	**current**	Jonidan 19
5	**Shōketsu**	189	March 1995	**current**	Makushita 4
6	Hokutoryū	187	March 1986	March 2017	Sandanme 53
6	Sawaisamu	187	July 1992	May 2025	Jonidan 53
8	**Yoshiazuma**	184	January 1996	**current**	Maegashira 12
9	**Dairaido**	183	March 1996	**current**	Jūryō 2
10	**Musashiumi**	177	March 1997	**current**	Makushita 5

=== Most top division tournaments ===
	Name	Total	First	Last	Highest rank
1	Kaiō	107	July 1993	July 2011	Ōzeki
2	Hakuhō	103	May 2004	September 2021	Yokozuna
3	**Tamawashi**	101	September 2008	**current**	Sekiwake
4	Kyokutenhō	99	January 1998	July 2015	Sekiwake
5	Takamiyama	97	January 1968	January 1984	Sekiwake
5	Aminishiki	97	July 2000	May 2018	Sekiwake
7	Terao	93	March 1985	May 2001	Sekiwake
8	Kotoshōgiku	92	January 2005	November 2020	Ōzeki
8	**Takayasu**	92	July 2007	**current**	Ōzeki
10	Akinoshima	91	March 1988	May 2003	Sekiwake

=== Most tournaments ranked at yokozuna ===
	Name	Total	First	Last
1	Hakuhō	84	July 2007	September 2021
2	Kitanoumi	63	September 1974	January 1985
3	Chiyonofuji	59	September 1981	May 1991
4	Taihō	58	November 1961	May 1971
5	Takanohana II	49	January 1995	January 2003
6	Akebono	48	March 1993	January 2001
7	Kashiwado	47	November 1961	July 1969
7	Wajima	47	July 1973	March 1981
9	Asashōryū	42	March 2003	January 2010
10	Kakuryū	41	May 2014	March 2021

- Of the wrestlers listed above, all but one ended their careers due to injury or old age. Asashōryū was forced to retire due to an assault allegation.

=== Most tournaments ranked at ōzeki ===
	Name	Total	First	Last	Ended by
1	Chiyotaikai	65	March 1999	November 2009	Demotion
1	Kaiō	65	September 2000	July 2011	Retirement
3	Takanohana I	50	November 1972	January 1981	Retirement
4	Kotoōshū	47	January 2006	November 2013	Demotion
5	Hokuten'yū	44	July 1983	September 1990	Retirement
6	Konishiki	39	July 1987	November 1993	Demotion
7	Takanonami	37	March 1994	May 2000	Demotion
8	Asashio	36	May 1983	March 1989	Retirement
9	Yutakayama	34	March 1963	September 1968	Retirement
10	Gōeidō	33	September 2014	January 2020	Retirement

- Of the wrestlers listed above, none achieved the highest rank of yokozuna. Kaiō failed his 2004 yokozuna run by a single win.

=== Most tournaments ranked at sekiwake or komusubi ===
	Name	S+K	S	K	First	Last	Highest rank
1	Kotonishiki	34	21	13	September 1990	September 1999	Sekiwake
2	Kaiō	32	21	11	May 1994	July 2000	Ōzeki
3	Musōyama	31	20	11	March 1994	September 2000	Ōzeki
4	Hasegawa	30	21	9	November 1965	September 1974	Sekiwake
4	Kotomitsuki	30	22	8	January 2001	July 2007	Ōzeki
6	**Mitakeumi**	29	19	10	November 2016	November 2022	Ōzeki
7	Akinoshima	27	12	15	November 1988	September 2000	Sekiwake
7	Takamiyama	27	8	19	November 1969	September 1982	Sekiwake
7	Tamagaki III	27	25	2	October 1796	November 1811	Ōzeki
10	Takatōriki	26	15	11	May 1991	May 2000	Sekiwake
10	Wakanosato	26	17	9	November 2000	September 2005	Sekiwake

- The lower san'yaku ranks of sekiwake and komusubi are often collectively referred to and classified as 'junior san'yaku'.

=== Most tournaments ranked at maegashira without a san'yaku title ===
	Name	M	First	Last	Highest rank
1	**Sadanoumi**	60	May 2014	November 2025	Maegashira 1
2	Higonoumi	53	March 1993	November 2001	Maegashira 1
3	Asanowaka	52	March 1994	May 2004	Maegashira 1
3	Toyohibiki	52	July 2007	May 2017	Maegashira 2
5	Kotoryū	51	July 1996	March 2005	Maegashira 1
6	Tokitsuumi	50	September 1998	September 2007	Maegashira 3
7	Kitakachidoki	49	January 1989	May 1998	Maegashira 1
8	**Chiyoshōma**	47	September 2016	September 2026	Maegashira 2
9	Minatofuji	46	July 1993	July 2001	Maegashira 2
10	Narutoumi	44	October 1949	November 1960	Maegashira 1

== Progress to top division ==
The table for the fastest progress shows wrestlers with the fewest tournaments from their professional debut to their top division debut since the six tournaments a year system was introduced in 1958. It excludes makushita tsukedashi and sandanme tsukedashi entrants who made their debut in the third makushita division or the fourth sandanme division.

=== Fastest progress to top division ===
Lowest number of tournaments to reach makuuchi from a maezumo debut.

	Name	Tour	Pro Debut	Top division debut	Highest rank
1	Jōkōryū	9	May 2011	November 2012	Komusubi
1	**Takerufuji**	9	September 2022	March 2024	Maegashira 4
1	**Aonishiki**	9	September 2023	March 2025	Ōzeki
4	Ōsunaarashi	10	March 2012	November 2013	Maegashira 1
4	Hokutōfuji	10	March 2015	November 2016	Komusubi
6	Kotoōshū	11	November 2002	September 2004	Ōzeki
6	Aran	11	January 2007	November 2008	Sekiwake
6	**Shōdai**	11	March 2014	January 2016	Ōzeki
6	**Tomokaze**	11	May 2017	March 2019	Maegashira 3
10	Itai	12	September 1978	September 1980	Komusubi
10	Konishiki	12	July 1982	July 1984	Ōzeki
10	Tochiazuma II	12	November 1994	November 1996	Ōzeki
10	Asashōryū	12	January 1999	January 2001	Yokozuna
10	Tokitenkū	12	July 2002	July 2004	Komusubi
10	Yoshikaze	12	January 2004	January 2006	Sekiwake
10	Baruto	12	May 2004	May 2006	Ōzeki
10	Sakaizawa	12	March 2006	March 2008	Maegashira 15
10	Yamamotoyama	12	January 2007	January 2009	Maegashira 9
10	**Ura**	12	March 2015	March 2017	Komusubi
10	**Atamifuji**	12	November 2020	November 2022	Sekiwake

- The fastest rise to makuuchi from a tsukedashi debut is shared by Endō and Hakunofuji, tied at three. Another six managed to ascent in four, including Miyabiyama's streak of four consecutive lower divisional championships on debut.

=== Slowest progress to top division ===
Highest number of tournaments to reach makuuchi from debut.

	Name	Tour	Pro Debut	Top division debut	Highest rank
1	Hoshiiwato	115	May 1970	July 1989	Maegashira 14
2	Kyokunankai	105	March 1993	September 2010	Maegashira 16
3	**Yoshiazuma**	93	January 1996	September 2011	Maegashira 12
4	Kotokasuga	91	March 1993	May 2008	Maegashira 7
5	Kototsubaki	89	March 1976	January 1991	Maegashira 3
6	Toyozakura	88	March 1989	November 2003	Maegashira 5
7	Takanomine	87	September 1974	March 1989	Maegashira 12
8	Kitazakura	86	March 1987	July 2001	Maegashira 9
9	Daimanazuru	85	May 1992	July 2006	Maegashira 16
9	**Kitaharima**	85	March 2002	July 2016	Maegashira 15

== Most special prizes ==
Special prizes (sanshō) were first awarded in 1947. They are given to wrestlers ranked sekiwake, komusubi or maegashira in acknowledgement of exceptional tournament performance.

	Name	Total	F	O	T	Years	Highest rank
1	Akinoshima	19	8	7	4	1988–1999	Sekiwake
2	Kotonishiki	18	3	7	8	1990–1998	Sekiwake
3	Kaiō	15	5	10	0	1994–2000	Ōzeki
4	Asashio	14	3	10	1	1979–1983	Ōzeki
4	Takatōriki	14	10	3	1	1990–2000	Sekiwake
4	**Takayasu**	14	7	4	3	2013–2026	Ōzeki
4	Tsurugamine	14	2	2	10	1956–1966	Sekiwake
8	Kotomitsuki	13	4	2	7	2000–2007	Ōzeki
8	Musōyama	13	4	5	4	1994–2000	Ōzeki
8	Tosanoumi	13	5	7	1	1995–2003	Sekiwake

== Most gold stars ==
Gold stars (kinboshi) were first awarded in 1930. They are given to maegashira ranked wrestlers who defeat a yokozuna, excluding wins by default or in a playoff.

	Name	Total	Years	Highest rank
1	Akinoshima	16	1988–1999	Sekiwake
2	Takamiyama	12	1968–1978	Sekiwake
2	Tochinonada	12	1998–2008	Sekiwake
4	Tosanoumi	11	1995–2003	Sekiwake
5	Kitanonada	10	1954–1961	Sekiwake
5	Haguroyama	10	1955–1961	Sekiwake
5	Tsurugamine	10	1955–1961	Sekiwake
5	Dewanishiki	10	1949–1963	Sekiwake
5	Ōzutsu	10	1979–1986	Sekiwake
10	Mitsuneyama	9	1944–1957	Ōzeki
10	Tamanoumi	9	1953–1958	Sekiwake
10	Hasegawa	9	1965–1974	Sekiwake
10	Fujizakura	9	1973–1981	Sekiwake
10	Takatōriki	9	1990–1998	Sekiwake
10	Ichinojō	9	2014–2022	Sekiwake

== Youngest yokozuna at time of promotion ==
The table lists those wrestlers who achieved sumo's highest rank at a young age, irrespective of their age at entry into sumo and the time they had spent in climbing through the ranks.

	Yokozuna	Birthday	Date of promotion	Age at promotion
1	Kitanoumi	May 16, 1953	July 24, 1974	21 years, 2 months, 8 days
2	Taihō	May 29, 1940	September 27, 1961	21 years, 3 months, 29 days
3	Hakuhō	March 11, 1985	May 30, 2007	22 years, 2 months, 19 days
4	Takanohana II	August 12, 1972	November 23, 1994	22 years, 3 months, 11 days
5	Asashōryū	September 27, 1980	January 29, 2003	22 years, 4 months, 2 days
6	Kashiwado	November 29, 1938	September 27, 1961	22 years, 9 months, 29 days
7	Futahaguro	August 12, 1963	July 23, 1986	22 years, 11 months, 11 days
8	Terukuni	January 10, 1919	May 27, 1942	23 years, 4 months, 17 days
9	Akebono	May 8, 1969	January 27, 1993	23 years, 8 months, 19 days
10	Hokutoumi	June 22, 1963	May 20, 1987	23 years, 10 months, 28 days

== See also ==
- Glossary of sumo terms
- List of active sumo wrestlers
- List of past sumo wrestlers
- List of sumo top division champions
- List of sumo top division runners-up
- List of sumo second division champions
- List of sumo stables
- List of years in sumo
- Makuuchi
