= Raiden Tameemon =

Japanese sumo wrestler

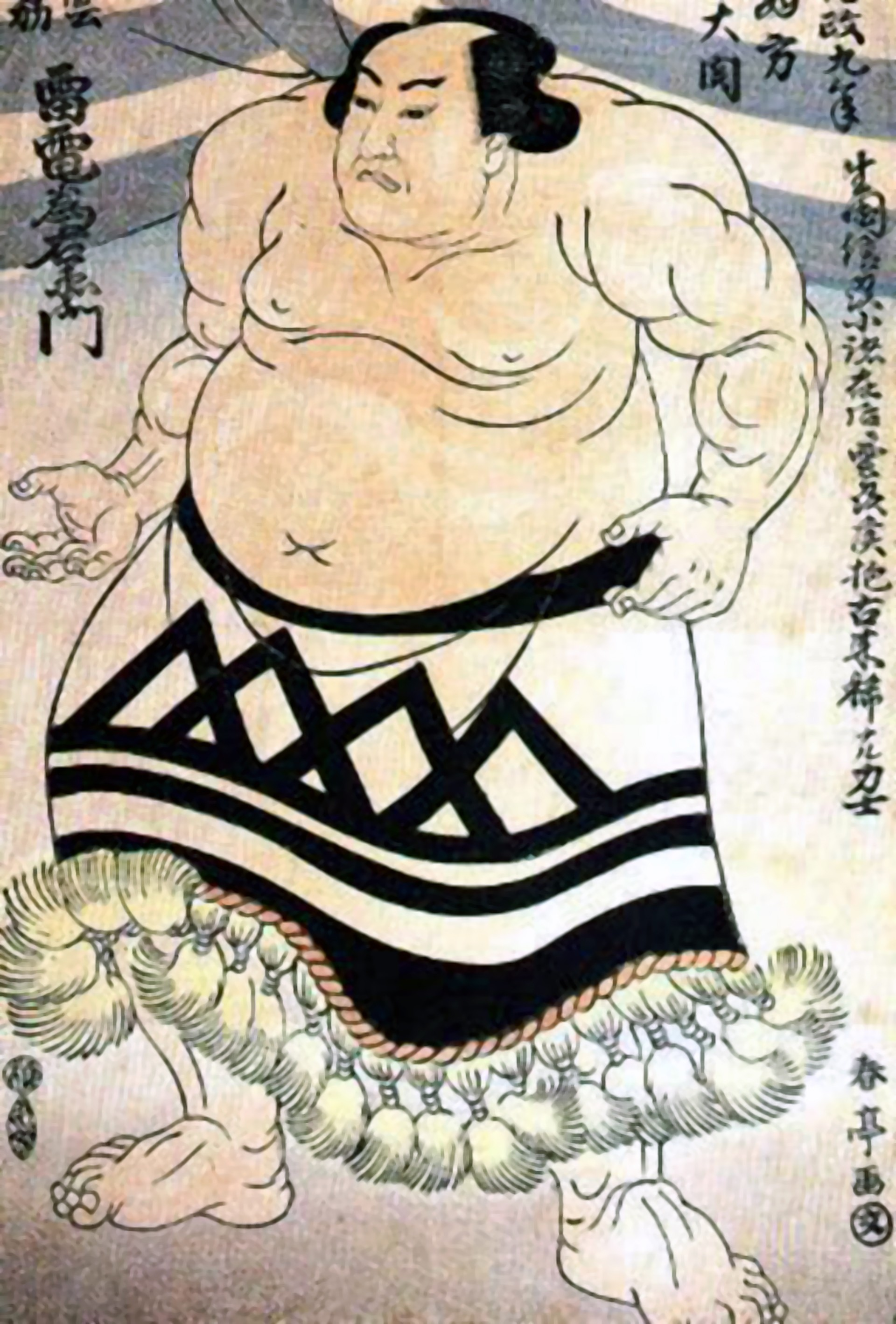

Personal information
- Native name: 雷電爲右衞門
- Born: Seki Tarōkichi; January 1767 Tōmi, Nagano, Japan
- Died: February 11, 1825 (aged 58)
- Height: 197 cm (6 ft 5.6 in)
- Weight: 169 kg (373 lb)

Sport
- Sport: Sumo
- Retired: February 1811
- Heya: Urakaze (Isenoumi)
- Record: 254–10–41
- Debut: November 1790
- Highest rank: Ōzeki (March 1795)
- Championships: 28 (Makuuchi, unofficial)
- Updated on June 2013

Raiden Tameemon (雷電爲右衞門), born Seki Tarōkichi (January 1767 – 11 February, 1825), was a Japanese sumo wrestler from Tōmi, Nagano Prefecture. He is considered one of the greatest rikishi in history, although he was never promoted to yokozuna. To date, he holds the record for best top division win ratio of all time.

== Early life ==
Raiden was born to a farming family in a village in rural Shinano Province. He is said to have possessed great physical strength even in childhood. His father Hanemon, who enjoyed sumo as much as sake, allowed 14-year-old Raiden to attend sumo classes at Nagaze (today called Murokocho), the neighboring village. When Raiden was 17, the Urakaze-beya stablemaster noticed him when he came through the area while on jungyō (regional tour) with his wrestlers. He was especially impressed with the young man's physique, which was extraordinary at the time. Young Raiden was 1.97 meters (6 ft 5.6 in) tall, which was three head lengths taller than most of his contemporaries. He also had matching long arms and large hands; a handprint at the Shofukuji temple near Okayama, which is said to be of Raiden's hand, measures 24 cm (9.4 in) from the wrist to the tip of the middle finger. When Raiden trained as a wrestler, he developed a weight of 169 kg (373 lb).

When Urakaze Kazuki invited him to Edo and started training him, it turned out that Raiden possessed not only the body of a giant (by 18th-century Japanese standards), but also a talent for sumo wrestling. He was especially talented in oshi-sumo techniques and was able to move at a high speed considering his size. Soon Raiden left his stable and unofficially joined Isenoumi-beya, where yokozuna Tanikaze became his coach.

== Professional sumo career ==
In 1789, the shikona (wrestler name) "Raiden", which means "thunder bolt", appeared in the banzuke ranking, although Raiden did not have his debut until fall 1790. Raiden was ranked as a sekiwake, as was common practice then. He had the best record in the basho (tournament) without a defeat. After Tanikaze's death, Raiden was promoted to ōzeki in March 1795, a rank he retained for nearly 17 years. Between November 1793 and April 1800, Raiden finished with the best record in all tournaments he participated in, ahead of the other great fighters of his time, Tanikaze and Onogawa. After 1800, he remained dominant, and sumo officials even disallowed him to use his favorite techniques in order to keep his matches interesting.

Of the 35 tournaments in which he participated (there were only two basho a year at the time), Raiden had the best record in no fewer than 28. In seven of those, he won without suffering a single defeat or draw. In total, he achieved 254 victories and only ten defeats, a winning percentage of 96.2, an all-time record. His longest winning streaks were eleven consecutive tournaments, or 44 bouts. Raiden's championships are, however, regarded as unofficial by the Japan Sumo Association, as before the current yūshō system was established in 1909, there was no prize given for individual performances in tournaments.

== Retirement from sumo ==
Finally, in spring 1811, Raiden retired from sumo at the age of 44. He became chairman of the sumo association of Izumo Province (in today's Shimane Prefecture), where his sponsor daimyō resided. In 1816, he moved to Edo and finished his diary Shokoku Sumo Hikae-cho ("journal of sumo in various regions"), which describes his time as an active wrestler since 1789.

After his death, he was buried in Akasaka in Edo. Two locks of his hair are buried in other graves which are located in his home village and in Matsue in Shimane.

When Raiden was still an active wrestler, his home village's residents built monuments honoring his parents. Raiden himself contributed a sake barrel made of stone in memory of his father. Since his death, Raiden has appeared not only as subject of a number of statues, but also on postage stamps, beer labels, anime and manga.

== Lack of yokozuna promotion ==
Despite his dominance at the time, Raiden never was promoted to yokozuna, the highest rank in sumo. The exact reason for this remains a mystery in the history of the sport.

Journalist Masahiko Nomi theorized that the 19th Yoshida Oikaze granted yokozuna licences to only two wrestlers, Tanikaze and Onogawa, and not intended to honor any more in the future. Decades later, the 20th Yoshida Oikaze attempted to defeat the Gojo family, which wanted to promote Kashiwado and Tamagaki to yokozuna, by awarding a yokozuna licence to Ōnomatsu Midorinosuke. Ōnomatsu became the first new yokozuna in nearly 40 years.

Another theory has suggested that the reason for the snub may have been due to clan politics. Raiden's sponsor, Daimyo Matsudaira Harusato, was a descendant of Yūki Hideyasu, a son of Tokugawa Ieyasu. The Yoshida family, who held the privilege of awarding the yokozuna licenses, supported the Hosokawa clan, who had a history of supporting Ishida Mitsunari.

Yokozuna was not formally recognized as rank on the banzuke until the beginning of the 20th century. When Jinmaku Kyūgorō erected the yokozuna memorial monument at Tomioka Hachiman Shrine in 1900, he included Raiden's name as a "peerless rikishi", in spite of his never having been officially promoted.

== Top division record ==
- The actual time the tournaments were held during the year in this period often varied.

Raiden Tamemon
-	Spring	Winter
1790	x	West Sekiwake; 8–0–2; 2h Unofficial
1791	West Sekiwake; 6–1–2; 1nr	West Sekiwake; 8–0–1; 1h
1792	Not enrolled	West Sekiwake; 2–0–1
1793	West Sekiwake; 8–1	West Sekiwake; 8–0–1; 1h Unofficial
1794	West Komusubi; 6–0–2; 1d 1h Unofficial	West Sekiwake; 8–0–1; 1h Unofficial
1795	West Ōzeki; 5–0; Unofficial	Not enrolled
1796	Not enrolled	West Ōzeki; 9–0–1; Unofficial
1797	West Ōzeki; 8–1–1; Unofficial	West Ōzeki; 10–0; Unofficial
1798	West Ōzeki; 8–0–1; 1nr Unofficial	West Ōzeki; 9–0–1; Unofficial
1799	West Ōzeki; 6–0–1; Unofficial	West Ōzeki; 9–0–1; Unofficial
1800	Not enrolled	West Ōzeki; 6–1–2; 1h
1801	West Ōzeki; 6–0–3; 1h Unofficial	Not enrolled
1802	Not enrolled	West Ōzeki; 8–0–2; Unofficial
1803	West Ōzeki; 5–0; 2h Unofficial	West Ōzeki; 9–0–1; Unofficial
1804	Not enrolled	West Ōzeki; 8–1–1; Unofficial
1805	West Ōzeki; 10–0; Unofficial	West Ōzeki; 9–1; Unofficial
1806	West Ōzeki; 3–1–1	West Ōzeki; 9–0; 1h Unofficial
1807	West Ōzeki; 8–0–1; 1h Unofficial	West Ōzeki; 8–0; 1h 1nr Unofficial
1808	West Ōzeki; 7–0–2; 1nr Unofficial	West Ōzeki; 9–1; Unofficial
1809	West Ōzeki; 8–0–1; 1h Unofficial	West Ōzeki; 7–1–2; Unofficial
1810	West Ōzeki; 9–0; 1nr Unofficial	West Ōzeki; 7–1–1; 1d Unofficial
1811	West Ōzeki; Retired; 0–0–10	x
Record given as win-loss-absent Top Division Champion Retired Lower Divisions Key: d=Draw(s) (引分); h=Hold(s) (預り); nr=no result recorded Divisions: Makuuchi — Jūryō — Makushita — Sandanme — Jonidan — Jonokuchi Makuuchi ranks: Yokozuna (not ranked as such on banzuke until 1890); Ōzeki — Sekiwake — Komusubi — Maegashira

*Championships for the best record in a tournament were not recognized or awarded before the 1909 summer tournament and the above unofficial championships are historically conferred. For more information see yūshō.

== See also ==
- List of sumo record holders
- Glossary of sumo terms
- List of past sumo wrestlers
- List of ozeki
