= Onogawa Kisaburō =

Japanese sumo wrestler

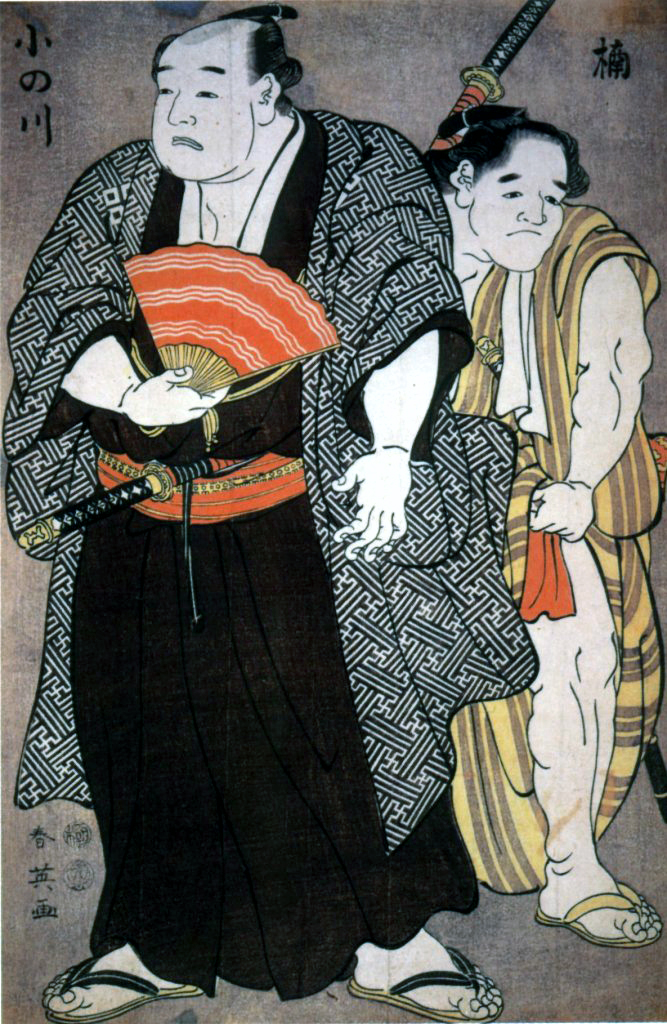
- 19th-century woodblock print of Onogawa (left)

Personal information
- Native name: 小野川喜三郎
- Born: 川村 喜三郎; Kawamura Kisaburō; 1758 Ōmi Province, Japan
- Died: April 30, 1806 (aged 48)
- Height: 1.76 m (5 ft 9 in)
- Weight: 116 kg (256 lb)

Sport
- Sport: Sumo
- Retired: October, 1798
- Heya: Kusazuri → Onogawa
- Record: 144-13-40; 4draws-10holds-3no results (Makuuchi)
- Debut: October, 1779
- Highest rank: Yokozuna (November, 1789)
- Elder name: Onogawa
- Championships: 7 (Makuuchi, unofficial)
- Updated on October 2007

Onogawa Kisaburō (Japanese: 小野川喜三郎; 1758 – April 30, 1806) was a Japanese sumo wrestler from Ōtsu, Ōmi Province (now Shiga Prefecture). He was the sport's 5th yokozuna. Along with Tanikaze, Onogawa was the first to be given a yokozuna licence during his lifetime. He is described as a leading figure of sumo during the Kansei era.

== Career ==
His real name was Kawamura Kisaburō (川村 喜三郎). When he was 14 years old, he became a pupil of Kusazuri Iwanosuke (草摺岩之助) in Osaka-sumo, and took the shikona, or ring name, Sagamigawa (相模川). The following year, he was adopted by his master, Onogawa Saisuke (小野川才助), and stepped in the ring for the first time in May of 1772. He later changed his ring name to Onogawa Kisaburō (小野川喜三郎) and moved to Edo-sumo in 1779. Onogawa was promoted to the top makuuchi division in March 1781 and began to wrestle for the Kurume Domain. In February 1782, he defeated ōzeki Tanikaze. The victory surprised people in Edo as it brought to an end Tanikaze's 63 consecutive victories, after four years and seven unbeaten seasons in Edo. Since then, the match between Tanikaze and Onogawa has been passed down in the annals of the sumo's history as one of the greatest matches of all time. Onogawa became a rival of Tanikaze and was popular with the public, although in reality he was quite far behind his rival and won only seven tournament titles to Tanikaze's 21.
In November 1789, the Yoshida family certified both Onogawa and Tanikaze as yokozuna in a ceremony which was also featured the introduction of the yokozuna dohyō-iri ceremony and the first appearance of the yokozuna 's belt. At the time however, the belt was closer to a shimenawa rope than the current tsuna. Onogawa was however past his prime and did not participate in many tournaments anymore. He broke his shoulder during training in March 1794, and his retirement was hastened by the sudden death of Tanikaze. After Tanikaze's death, Onogawa refused to wrestle ōzeki Raiden Tameimon, who was Tanikaze's apprentice. His withdrawal led to a period of dominance where Raiden had no rivals. Onogawa's popularity waned without any opportunities to be seen in the ring and he retired in October 1797. Onogawa won 91.7% of his bouts, winning 144 times and losing only 13 times. The next yokozuna, Ōnomatsu, was not appointed for another thirty years.
Some sources say that after retirement he returned to Osaka and opened a teahouse in Haramachi (now Kawachinagano, Osaka Prefecture), which became prosperous. A more likely source wants him to have stayed as an elder in Edo under his ring name. He died on March 12, 1806. His grave is in the premises of the Enjōin temple in Tennōji, Osaka.

A popular story holds that Onogawa studied jujutsu with renowned Kyūshin Ryū Sōke Inugami Gunbei after being thrown down twice in a casual match with that master outside a teahouse.

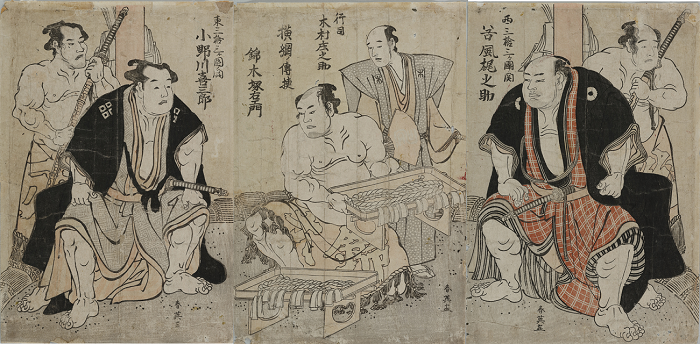
Sekiwake Onogawa Kisaburō (left) and Tanikaze Kajinosuke (right) are given shimenawa belts representing their future status of yokozuna. They are the first wrestlers in sumo history to be given this status in their lifetime.

Another story tells that, after Onogawa became an official rikishi of the lord of the Kurume domain, he exterminated the ghosts that plagued the lord's domain at night by his boldness, as depicted in an ukiyo-e woodblock print produced by Yoshitoshi in his series on the 'One Hundred Ghost Stories of China and Japan'.

== Fighting style ==
Onogawa was much shorter than Tanikaze at only 1.76 m (5 ft 9 1/2 in) but he had a speedy, crowd pleasing sumo style which helped him overcome his small physique. Onogawa is often depicted as good at standing his ground, careful and seamless.

== In popular culture ==
Onogawa makes an appearance in the Record of Ragnarok manga series, where he cheers on Raiden during his fight.

== Top division record ==
- The actual time the tournaments were held during the year in this period often varied.

Onogawa
-	Spring	Winter
1781	East Maegashira #3; 5–1–3; 1h	East Jūryō #5; 6–2
1782	East Jūryō #3; 5–1	East Maegashira #4; 7–1–1; 1d
1783	East Maegashira #4; 5–0–3; 1h 1nr	East Maegashira #2; 6–0–2; 1d 1h
1784	East Komusubi; 6–2; 2h	East Sekiwake; 9–0–1; Unofficial
1785	Not held	Not held
1786	Unenrolled	East Sekiwake; 7–0–3; Unofficial
1787	Called off due to bad harvest	East Sekiwake; 7–1–2
1788	East Sekiwake; 7–2–1	East Sekiwake; 7–1–1; 1h
1789	East Sekiwake; 10–0; Unofficial	East Sekiwake; 8–0; 1d 1h Unofficial
1790	East Ōzeki; 8–0; 1nr Unofficial	East Ōzeki; 6–1–2; 1h
1791	East Ōzeki; 8–0–1; 1nr Unofficial	East Ōzeki; 8–0–1; 1h Unofficial
1792	Unenrolled	Unenrolled
1793	Unenrolled	East Ōzeki; 8–1; 1d
1794	East Ōzeki; 3–0–7	Sat out
1795	East Ōzeki; 4–0–1	Unenrolled
1796	Unenrolled	East Ōzeki; 7–2–1
1797	Unenrolled	East Ōzeki; Retired; 8–1–1
Record given as win-loss-absent Top Division Champion Retired Lower Divisions Key: d=Draw(s) (引分); h=Hold(s) (預り); nr=no result recorded Divisions: Makuuchi — Jūryō — Makushita — Sandanme — Jonidan — Jonokuchi Makuuchi ranks: Yokozuna (not ranked as such on banzuke until 1890); Ōzeki — Sekiwake — Komusubi — Maegashira

*Championships for the best record in a tournament were not recognized or awarded before the 1909 summer tournament, and the unofficial championships above are historically conferred. For more information, see yūshō.

== See also ==
- List of yokozuna
- List of past sumo wrestlers
- Glossary of sumo terms

Preceded by Tanikaze Kajinosuke	5th Yokozuna; 1789–1798	Succeeded by Ōnomatsu Midorinosuke
Yokozuna is not a successive rank, and more than one wrestler can hold the title at once
