= Tanikaze Kajinosuke =

Japanese sumo wrestler (1750–1795)

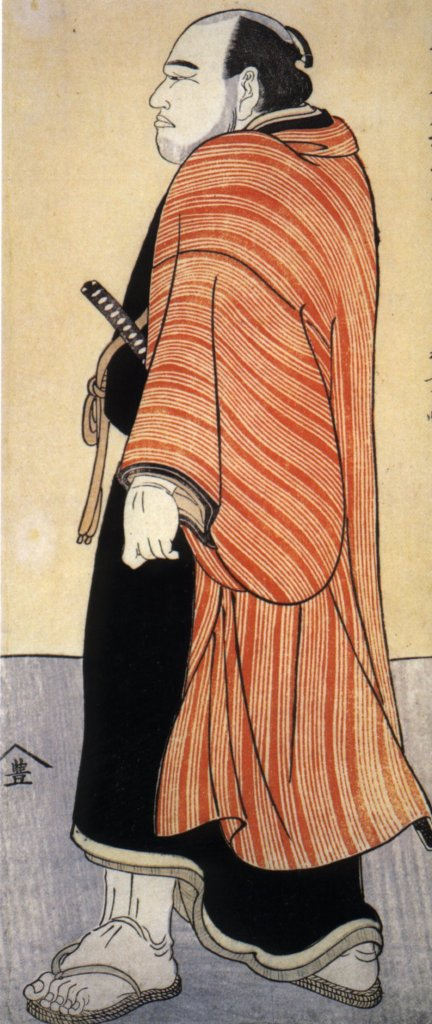

Personal information
- Native name: 谷風 梶之助
- Born: 金子 与四郎; Kaneko Yoshirō; September 8, 1750 Miyagi District, Mutsu Province, Japan
- Died: February 27, 1795 (aged 44)
- Height: 1.89 m (6 ft 2 in)
- Weight: 169 kg (373 lb; 26.6 st)

Sport
- Sport: Sumo
- Heya: Isenoumi
- Record: 258-14-112
- Debut: April 1769
- Highest rank: Yokozuna (November 1789)
- Championships: 21 (unofficial)
- Updated on July 2007

Tanikaze Kajinosuke (Japanese: 谷風梶之助; September 8, 1750 – February 27, 1795) was a Japanese sumo wrestler from the Edo period. Officially recognized as the fourth yokozuna, he was however effectively the first, as he was the first (along with Onogawa) to be awarded the title during his lifetime. He achieved great fame and, though championships from this period are unofficial, he achieved the equivalent of 21 tournament championships. He was also the coach of Raiden Tameemon.

== Early career ==
Tanikaze was born Kaneko Yoshirō (金子 与四郎) in Miyagi District, Mutsu Province (now Wakabayashi, Sendai). He was known for having an outstanding physique from an early age and became an apprentice of a wrestler named Sekinoto in 1768. Later Sekinoto inherited the name Isenoumi. With a height of 189 cm and a weight of 169 kg, Tanikaze was extremely large in comparison with most Japanese men of his era. In April of the following year, he went to Edo-sumo and was given the shikona, or ring name, Tatsugaseki (達ヶ関) by the Date clan. He briefly held the title of kanban-ōzeki (看板大関), 'guest ōzeki'. Kanban-ōzeki were sumo wrestlers who were listed as ōzeki in the ranking simply because they were big and good-looking enough to briefly fill a gap when an official ōzeki was absent. The real talents were below the sekiwake rank, and the ōzeki rarely wrestled, and if they did, it was only against other kanban-ōzeki or lower-ranked rikishi. Most of the kanban-ōzeki disappeared after Tanikaze career peak. Tanikaze was recognised for his ability and had to relinquish his title, dropping to maegashira, from where he retained his san'yaku rank on merit. In 1776, he changed his ring name to Tanikaze Kajinosuke (谷風 梶之助), starting with the May 1776 Osaka tournament.

=== Winning streak ===
From March 1778 to February 1782, Tanikaze scored 63 consecutive victories. During this period, he only lost one bout to Onogawa Kisaburō in February 1782. This streak was recorded as the longest run of consecutive victories in sumo bouts at that time. This record remained unbroken until Futabayama, 150 years later, who scored 69 consecutive victories in 1938. At the time however, rikishi travelled freely between Edo, Kyoto and Osaka, and performed at each tournament. Although Tanikaze wrestled in other cities and gained a record of 98 consecutive wins, his official record for consecutive victories generally refers to '63 consecutive victories in the Edo main tournament'.
After losing to Onogawa, Tanikaze won another 43 consecutive victories in a row.

== Yokozuna ==
On November 19, 1789, he and Onogawa were granted a special yokozuna license by the Yoshida family. He also became one of the first two sumo wrestlers to be allowed to perform a yokozuna dohyō-iri. At the time of his promotion, he and Onogawa were ranked as sekiwake. At the time, the rank of yokozuna was more of an honorary title and wrestlers weren't designated as such in the banzuke, or ranking sheet, hence explaining why the two wrestlers are promoted while being ranked at sekiwake. Officially Tanikaze is recorded as being the 4th yokozuna in sumo history but is effectively the first, as the first three were awarded the title posthumously.

== Death and posthumous influence ==
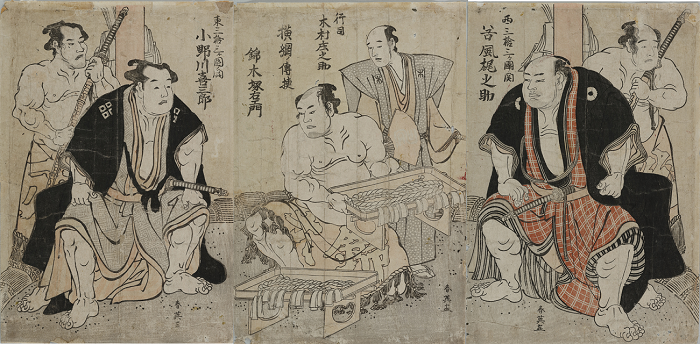
Sekiwake Onogawa Kisaburō (left) and Tanikaze Kajinosuke (right) are given shimenawa belts representing their future status of yokozuna. They are the first wrestlers in sumo history to be given this status in their lifetime.

On 9 January 1795, Tanikaze contracted influenza, which spread throughout Edo, and died suddenly at the age of 44 while still active. The wrestler who succeeded Tanikaze as ōzeki was Raiden Tameemon, who was an apprentice of Tanikaze. He was on another winning streak of 35 bouts at the time of his death, making him a leading figure of sumo during the Tenmei and Kansei eras. In the top makuuchi division, Tanikaze won 258 bouts and lost only 14 bouts, achieving a winning percentage of 94.9. Tanikaze was buried in his hometown of Wakabayashi, Sendai and his tomb serves as a monument in a residential area.
The Tanikaze shikona became a prestigious name in the Edo-sumo association and several wrestlers were given the opportunity to take it, but all declined. Today, the name is said to be tome-na (止め名), meaning that it is a name which is no longer allowed to be used.
Tanikaze was a very popular rikishi. Unlike other wrestlers of his day, many nishiki-e portraits and images of him participating in bouts still remain.

== Fighting style ==
Tanikaze's reputation at the time was that he had a great strength. He is frequently described as an expert in sumo, short in the waist and quick in the stride, with a strong back and quick feet.

== Family ==
He had a younger brother, Dategaseki Moriemon (1756-1807), who was also a sumo wrestler and reached the top division himself in 1791. They were the second pair of brothers in sumo history to both reach makuuchi.

== Homage ==
Tanikaze is the wrestler chosen to represent sumo in the popular nishiki-e 'The three pleasures of Edo', representing the three most popular entertainments at the time (sumo, kabuki and yoshiwara).

Tanikaze makes an appearance in the Record of Ragnarok manga series, where he appears on flashbacks at the time of his retirement and cheers on Raiden during his fight.

== Top division record ==
- The actual time the tournaments were held during the year in this period often varied.
- Tanikaze's first three tournaments were as a "guest" ōzeki, see above.
- Tanikaze's record for the Spring 1776 tournament is unknown.

Tanikaze
-	Spring	Winter
1769	West Ōzeki; 4–0–3	West Ōzeki; 0–1–7
1770	West Ōzeki; 3–0–5	West Maegashira #1; 7–1
1771	Sat out	West Komusubi #1; 5–0; 1d 2h
1772	West Komusubi #1; 6–0–2; Unofficial	Not held
1773	West Maegashira #1; 5–1; 1d 1h	West Maegashira #1; 5–2; 1h
1774	West Maegashira #1; 6–0–2; Unofficial	West Komusubi; 5–0–1; 2d
1775	West Komusubi; 4–0; Unofficial	West Komusubi; 5–1–1; 2h
1776	West Maegashira #1 –	West Komusubi; 7–0; 1nr Unofficial
1777	West Sekiwake; 2–1–5	West Komusubi; 5–1; 1d 1h Unofficial
1778	West Sekiwake; 9–0–1; Unofficial	Sat out
1779	West Sekiwake; 9–0–1; Unofficial	West Sekiwake; 9–0; 1d Unofficial
1780	West Sekiwake; 6–0; Unofficial	West Sekiwake; 8–0; 2h Unofficial
1781	West Ōzeki; 9–0–1; Unofficial	West Sekiwake; 9–0–1; Unofficial
1782	West Ōzeki; 6–1–3	West Ōzeki; 7–0–1; 1h 1nr Unofficial
1783	West Ōzeki; 5–0–4; 1nr Unofficial	West Ōzeki; 8–0–1; 1d Unofficial
1784	West Ōzeki; 6–0–2; 2h Unofficial	West Ōzeki; 3–0–7
1785	Not held	Not held
1786	West Ōzeki; 10–0; Unofficial	West Ōzeki; 3–1–6
1787	Called off due to bad harvest	West Sekiwake; 6–1–1; 1d 1h
1788	West Sekiwake; 7–0–1; 1d 1h Unofficial	West Sekiwake; 7–0–1; 1d 1h
1789	West Sekiwake; 7–1–1; 1d	West Sekiwake; 6–0–3; 1d
1790	West Ōzeki; 4–0–2; 1d 1h 1nr	West Ōzeki; 7–1–1; 1d
1791	West Ōzeki; 6–1–2; 1nr	Sat out
1792	West Ōzeki; 8–0–2; Unofficial	West Ōzeki; 3–0; Unofficial
1793	West Ōzeki; 7–0–2; Unofficial	West Ōzeki; 5–0–3; 2d
1794	West Ōzeki; 5–0–5	West Ōzeki; 4–0–6
Record given as win-loss-absent Top Division Champion Retired Lower Divisions Key: d=Draw(s) (引分); h=Hold(s) (預り); nr=no result recorded Divisions: Makuuchi — Jūryō — Makushita — Sandanme — Jonidan — Jonokuchi Makuuchi ranks: Yokozuna (not ranked as such on banzuke until 1890); Ōzeki — Sekiwake — Komusubi — Maegashira

*Championships for the best record in a tournament were not recognized or awarded before the 1909 summer tournament, and the unofficial championships above are historically conferred. For more information, see yūshō.

== See also ==
- List of sumo record holders
- List of yokozuna
- Glossary of sumo terms
- List of past sumo wrestlers

Preceded by Maruyama Gondazaemon	4th Yokozuna; 1789–1794	Succeeded by Onogawa Kisaburō
Yokozuna is not a successive rank, and more than one wrestler can hold the title at once
