= Kagamiiwa Hamanosuke II =

Japanese sumo wrestler

Kagamiiwa Hamanosuke
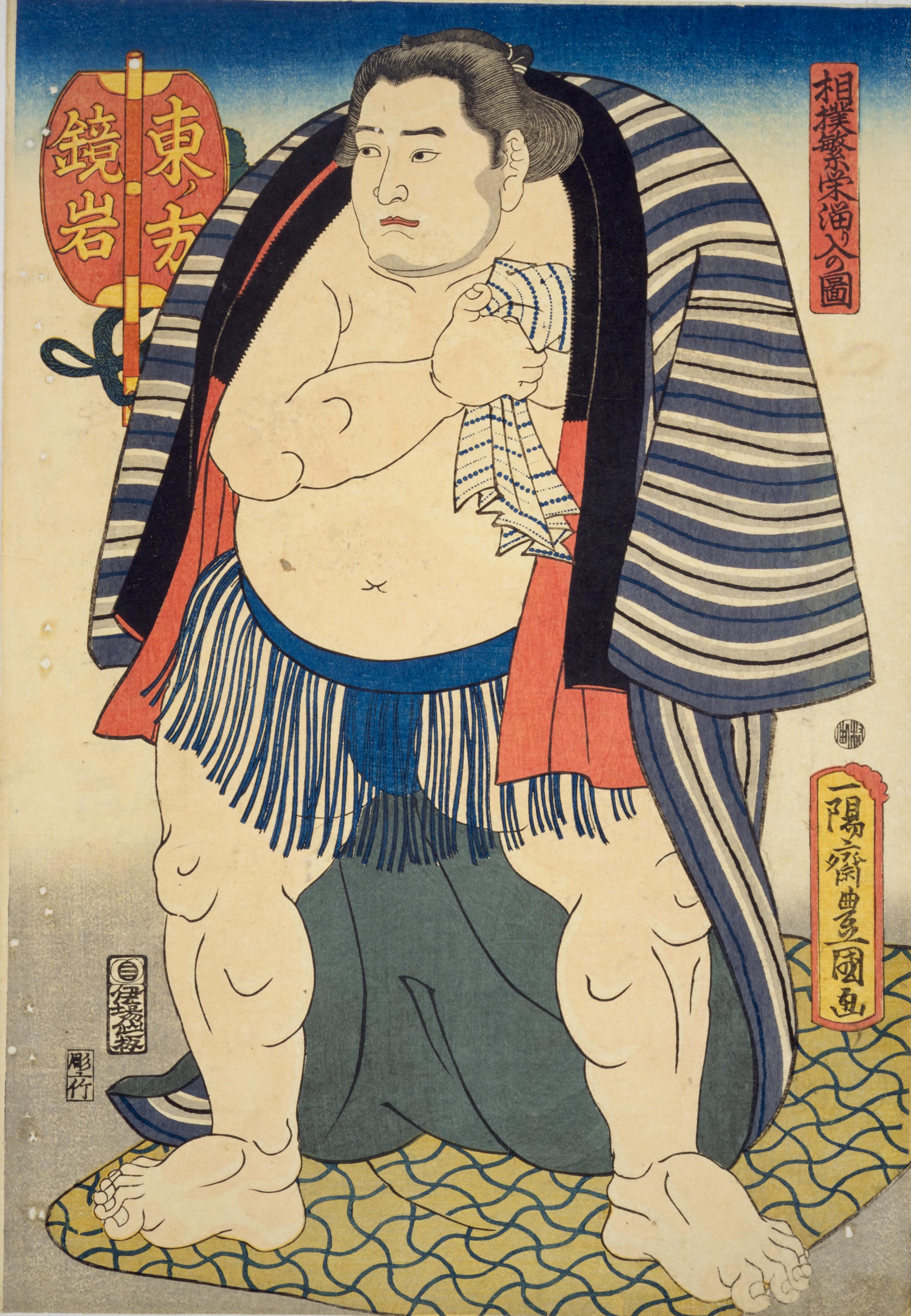

Personal information
- Native name: 鏡岩 濱之助
- Born: Hirose (family name); 1809 Monou District, Mutsu Province, Japan
- Died: November 4, 1866 (aged 56–57)

Sport
- Sport: Sumo
- Retired: January, 1856
- Heya: Ikazuchi
- Record: 176-63-87-19 draws/16 holds
- Debut: March, 1830
- Highest rank: Ōzeki (November, 1850)
- Elder name: Kumegawa
- Championships: 1 (Makuuchi, unofficial)
- Updated on October 2023

Kagamiiwa Hamanosuke (Japanese: 鏡岩 濱之助; born Hirose (広瀬), 1809 – November 4, 1866) was a Japanese sumo wrestler from Nakakanbara District, Echigo Province (now Gosen in Niigata Prefecture, following the merger of Muramatsu). His highest rank was ōzeki. He is the third wrestler from this prefecture to have been promoted to this rank and the first since Kumonryū in 1787, 63 years earlier. He is also the last wrestler to hold that title until the promotion of Haguroyama in 1940, 90 years later.

== Career ==
Nothing is known of him before he became a wrestler by joining the Edo-based sumo association, joining Ikazuchi stable in 1830 under the teaching of yokozuna Umegatani I. In 1835 he was given the shikona, or ring name, Wadanoura Hamagorō (和田ノ浦 濱五郎). The next year, he was promoted to the makuuchi division. In 1838, he again changed his shikona to Kagamiiwa Hamanosuke (鏡岩 濱之助), a shikona used by a komusubi and a maegashira in Ikazuchi stable between 1794 and 1826. Due to a period of recession at the time, he took part in only one six-day tournament, winning five of those matches and claiming the equivalent of a championship win. However, as the yūshō system wasn't invented until 1909, this championship victory is today considered unofficial. He wasn't known as a flamboyant or dominant wrestler, but he consistently climbed the rankings not winning much against strong opponents such as Inazuma, Shiranui, Hidenoyama or Tsurugizan.

Having attained the rank of sekiwake in November 1845 he maintained this rank for 5 years before being promoted to ōzeki after Hidenoyama's retirement. At this rank, he was recognized as having fulfilled his duties without causing any surprises, being a stable ōzeki. He rarely won against higher-ranked wrestlers but he was evenly matched with other ōzeki and did not lose much against those below the rank of sekiwake. He retired in 1856, remaining in the association as a master under the name Kumegawa Hamanosuke (粂川 濱之助) and founding his own stable. As a coach he raised maegashira Kiryūzan I who later inherited his name and stable.

He died on November 4, 1866. His tomb is located on the site of the Nanzo-in temple in Toshima, Tokyo. With him are buried the seventh (maegashira Kiryūzan II) and eighth (ōzeki Kagamiiwa) generations of Kumegawa, as was traditional at the time.

The eighth generation of Kumegawa, Kagamiiwa inherited his shikona in 1921 after joining the stable he had founded, and reached the rank of ōzeki in 1937.

== Top division record ==
- The actual time the tournaments were held during the year in this period often varied.

Kagamiiwa Hamanosuke
-	Spring	Winter
1830	Unknown	Unknown
1831	Unknown	Unknown
1832	Unknown	Unknown
1833	Unknown	Unknown
1834	Unknown	Unknown
1835	Unknown	Unknown
1836	East Jūryō #6; 1–3	West Jūryō #6; 5–3
1837	West Jūryō #1; 4–3	East Maegashira #7; 3–3–3; 1d
1838	West Maegashira #6; 5–1; Unofficial	East Maegashira #3; 4–1–4; 1h
1839	East Maegashira #2; 4–1–4; 1d	East Maegashira #2; 5–1–2; 2d
1840	East Maegashira #2; 5–2–1; 2d	East Maegashira #1; 6–1–2; 1d
1841	East Komusubi #1; 6–1–1; 2h	East Komusubi #1; 5–3
1842	East Maegashira #1; 6–0–2; 1d	East Maegashira #1; 5–2–2; 1d
1843	East Komusubi #1; 7–2–1	East Komusubi #1; 5–1–3; 1h
1844	East Komusubi #1; 3–2–2; 2d-1h	East Komusubi #1; 5–1–3
1845	East Komusubi #1; 4–1–2; 1d	East Sekiwake #1; 3–0–6; 1h
1846	East Sekiwake #1; 4–1–5	East Sekiwake #1; 6–2–1
1847	Sat out	East Sekiwake #1; 4–2–2; 1d
1848	East Sekiwake #1; 5–1–3; 1h	East Sekiwake #1; 5–2–1; 2h
1849	East Sekiwake #1; 5–3–1; 1d	East Sekiwake #1; 6–1–2; 1h
1850	West Sekiwake #1; 5–0–4; 1d	West Ōzeki #1; 5–2–1; 2d
1851	West Ōzeki #1; 4–1	West Ōzeki #1; 6–1–3
1852	West Ōzeki #1; 3–3–3; 1d	West Ōzeki #1; 4–3–1; 1h
1853	West Ōzeki #1; 7–2–1	West Ōzeki #1; 4–2–2; 1d
1854	West Ōzeki #1; 5–0–3; 1d-1h	West Ōzeki #1; 4–2–2; 2h
1855	Sat out	Unknown
1856	West Ōzeki #1; Retired; 3–3–4	x
Record given as win-loss-absent Top Division Champion Retired Lower Divisions Key: d=Draw(s) (引分); h=Hold(s) (預り); nr=no result recorded Divisions: Makuuchi — Jūryō — Makushita — Sandanme — Jonidan — Jonokuchi Makuuchi ranks: Yokozuna (not ranked as such on banzuke until 1890); Ōzeki — Sekiwake — Komusubi — Maegashira

*Championships for the best record in a tournament were not recognized or awarded before the 1909 summer tournament and the above unofficial championships are historically conferred. For more information see yūshō.

== See also ==
- Glossary of sumo terms
- List of past sumo wrestlers
- List of ōzeki
