= Asahidake Tsurunosuke =

Japanese sumo wrestler

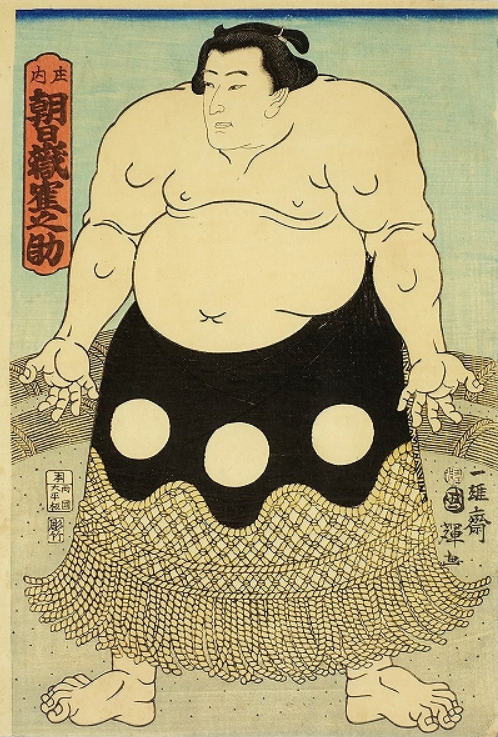
- Asahidake in 1865

Personal information
- Native name: 朝日嶽 鶴之助
- Born: Shōzō Honma; 1840 Tsuruoka, Yamagata Prefecture, Japan
- Died: April 4, 1882 (aged 41–42)
- Height: 1.80 m (5 ft 11 in)
- Weight: 113 kg (249 lb)

Sport
- Sport: Sumo
- Retired: June, 1878
- Heya: Tatsutagawa
- Record: 104-45-45-42 draws/7 holds
- Debut: October, 1860
- Highest rank: Ōzeki (December, 1877)
- Elder name: Tatsutagawa
- Updated on September, 2023

Asahidake Tsurunosuke (朝日嶽 鶴之助; 1840 – April 4, 1882) was a Japanese professional sumo wrestler from Tsuruoka, Yamagata Prefecture. His highest rank was ōzeki. He is the fourth ōzeki from Yamagata Prefecture and the first promoted at this rank since Genjiyama in October 1825, 52 years earlier.

== History ==
Asahidake was born in Tsuruoka, Yamagata Prefecture into a farming family and worked for a time as a fisherman. He eventually moved to Murakami, Echigo Province and began working as a boatman for the Shōnai Domain. He was noticed by the clan lord because of his strength and was brought to Edo to take part in the construction effort of the Odaiba. While in Edo, he was scouted by the stablemaster of Tatsutagawa stable and decided to join the Edo-based sumo association to train as a wrestler.

He began wrestling actively in October 1860 under the shikona, or ring name, Yuranoumi (由良ノ海) and under the patronage of the Shōnai Domain. He later changed his ring name to evoke a mountain in his home prefecture. In 1867, while still a jūryō wrestler, he inflicted defeat on Shiranui, who was by then already a respected ōzeki and winner of several tournaments. Asahidake was finally promoted to the makuuchi division at the following tournament and during his career in sumo's highest division, he held most of the ranks in san'yaku. Just after his promotion to makuuchi, he succeeded his master at the head of his stable and became an elder under the name Tatsutagawa, although he continued to fight under the two-licence system. Asahidake was not known as a prodigious wrestler, but climbed the rankings steadily. Popular with the public, a saying was associated with him and said he was "a Jinmaku for his technique, a Sakaigawa for his belly: Asahi is just right" (相撲なら陣幕、腹で境川、程よいのは朝日).

During the events of the Boshin War in 1868, Asahidake briefly left his stable to fight alongside the Sakai clan in the Battle of Toba-Fushimi, during which he served as a banner-bearer for his patrons. In 1877 he was finally promoted to ōzeki, but only held the rank for two tournaments before retiring as a wrestler. After his retirement he remained within the sumo association and devoted himself entirely to training his wrestlers. In 1878, when he visited his hometown Yamagata on a regional tour, the prefectural governor at the time, Mishima Michitsune, arranged for the Gojō family to grant Asahidake a yokozuna licence, allowing him to perform a yokozuna ring-entering ceremony. However, as Asahidake was not licensed by the Yoshida family, he is not counted among the list of official yokozuna. For some time, Asahidake hoped to obtain an official licence from the Yoshida family, but without success.

Asahidake eventually fell ill and died four years after his retirement on 4 April 1882.

== Career record ==
Asahidake Tsurunosuke
-	Spring	Summer
1865	Jūryō #30; 0–0	Jūryō #30; 0–0
1866	West Jūryō #6; 4–2; 1d	West Jūryō #5; 6–1; 1d-1h
1867	West Jūryō #1; 4–2; 2d	West Jūryō #1; 8–0; 1d
1868	West Maegashira #4; 1–2–7	West Maegashira #3; 0–0–10
1869	West Maegashira #5; 4–3–2; 1d	West Maegashira #3; 4–3–2; 1d
1870	West Maegashira #2; 5–2–1; 1d-1h	West Maegashira #2; 5–0–1; 3d-1h
1871	West Maegashira #1; 3–4–1; 2d	East Maegashira #1; 4–2–4
1872	East Komusubi #1; 4–2–1; 2d-1h	West Maegashira #1; 4–3–1; 2d
1873	West Komusubi #1; 4–1–1; 1d	West Komusubi #1; 4–2–1; 2d-1h
1874	West Sekiwake #1; 6–1–1; 2d	West Sekiwake #1; 5–1–1; 3d
1875	West Sekiwake #1; 5–1–1; 2d-1h	West Sekiwake #1; 3–1–1; 2d-1h
1876	West Sekiwake #1; 5–3–1; 1d	West Sekiwake #1; 4–2–2; 2d
1877	West Sekiwake #1; 5–3–1; 1d	West Ōzeki #1; 5–3–1; 1d
1878	West Ōzeki #1; Retired; 2–1–4; 3d	
Record given as win-loss-absent Top Division Champion Retired Lower Divisions Key: d=Draw(s) (引分); h=Hold(s) (預り); nr=no result recorded Divisions: Makuuchi — Jūryō — Makushita — Sandanme — Jonidan — Jonokuchi Makuuchi ranks: Yokozuna (not ranked as such on banzuke until 1890); Ōzeki — Sekiwake — Komusubi — Maegashira

*Championships for the best record in a tournament were not recognized or awarded before the 1909 summer tournament and the above championships that are labelled "unofficial" are historically conferred. For more information see yūshō.

== See also ==
- Glossary of sumo terms
- List of past sumo wrestlers
- List of ōzeki
