= Ayasegawa Sanzaemon =

Japanese sumo wrestler

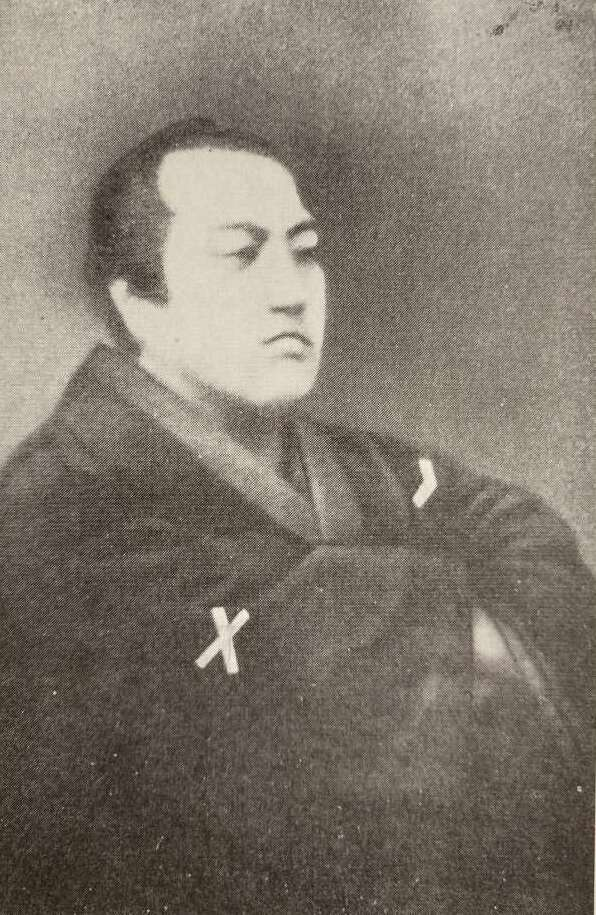

Personal information
- Native name: 綾瀬川 山左エ門
- Born: Tōjirō Kawamura; October , 1835 Higashinari, Settsu Province, Japan
- Died: March 8, 1877 (aged 41)
- Height: 1.73 m (5 ft 8 in)
- Weight: 113 kg (249 lb)

Sport
- Sport: Sumo
- Retired: April, 1876
- Heya: Minato → Hidenoyama
- Record: 94-22-46-24 draws/2 holds
- Debut: October, 1861
- Highest rank: Ōzeki (April, 1872)
- Championships: 1 (Makuuchi, unofficial)
- Updated on September 2023

Ayasegawa Sanzaemon (Japanese: 綾瀬川 山左エ門; born Tōjirō Kawamura (川村 藤次郎, Kawamura Tōjirō), October 1835 – March 8, 1877) was a Japanese sumo wrestler from Higashinari, Settsu Province (now part of Osaka in the eponymous prefecture). His highest rank was ōzeki. He is the first wrestler from Osaka Prefecture to have been promoted at this rank in sumo history, and the only one until Ōnishiki's promotion in 1916, 44 years later.

== Career ==
Little is known about Ayasegawa's origins. Although his birthplace is generally associated with Higashinari, Settsu Province, it is sometimes mentioned that he was actually born in Nakashima, Owari. He began his wrestling career by joining the Osaka-based sumo association and joined the Minato stable, under the tutelage of yokozuna Shiranui Dakuemon. Eventually, he left Osaka in the first year of the Bunkyū era to join the Edo-based association and was recruited into Hidenoyama stable, now being trained by the eponymous yokozuna and being stablemate with Jinmaku. In 1866, while still in makushita, he received a patronage proposal from the Himeji Domain and was given the shikona, or ring name, Aioi Matsugorō (相生 松五郎). After going undefeated in the first jūryō tournament of 1868, Ayasegawa was promoted to sumo's top division, makuuchi. At the time, the second makuuchi tournament of 1868 wasd the first held in the Meiji era, making Ayasegawa the first wrestler promoted to makuuchi of this era. Ayasegawa progressed rapidly, even winning the equivalent of a tournament in 1871. However, as the yūshō system wasn't invented until 1909, this championship victory is today considered unofficial. Between 1870 and 1872, he recorded the equivalent of 27 consecutive victories. He quickly became popular with the public for his sharp appearance and jinku folk-songs were written in his name.

During the abolition of the han system, Ayasegawa found himself without a patron but swore with Takasago Uragorō (then still known under the shikona "Takamiyama") to no longer compete with other patrons. Nevertheless, Ayasegawa was recruited by the Yamauchi clan and Yamauchi Toyoshige, the clan lord, gave him his definitive shikona of Ayasegawa Sanzaemon (綾瀬川 山左エ門). Because of this act of betrayal, Takamiyama attacked Ayasegawa's property, demanding compensation. The conflict was eventually settled by the mediation of other wrestlers, and Takamiyama, as a reward for his loyalty to the Sakai clan, was given his historic name of "Takasago".

In 1876, he announced his retirement and decided not to remain with the association as an elder. Instead, he opened an inn in the Kakigaracho district of Chūō, Tokyo. In 1877, he moved back to Osaka, but died the same year, on March 8, 1877. His tomb is located on the grounds of Isshin-ji temple in Osaka.

A number of personalities can trace their roots to Ayasegawa, including actor and newspaper reporter Sagoromo Kurishima, his second son, and actress Sumiko Kurishima, his granddaughter.

== Top division record ==
- The actual time the tournaments were held during the year in this period often varied.

Ayasegawa Sanzaemon
-	Spring	Summer
1867	West Jūryō #10; 8–1; 1d	West Jūryō #7; 6–2; 1d
1868	East Jūryō #2; 9–0	East Maegashira #5; 5–3–1; 1h
1869	East Maegashira #5; 5–3–1; 1d	East Maegashira #2; 6–3–1
1870	East Maegashira #1; 5–0–3; 1d-1h	East Maegashira #1; 5–0–2; 3d
1871	East Komusubi #1; 8–0–1; 1d Unofficial	East Komusubi #1; 5–0–3; 2d
1872	East Haridashi Ōzeki; 6–1–3	West Ōzeki #1; 6–1–1; 2d
1873	West Ōzeki #1; 1–2–5; 2d	West Ōzeki #1; 4–1–3; 2d
1874	West Ōzeki #1; 6–1–1; 2d	West Ōzeki #1; 5–1–1; 3d
1875	West Ōzeki #1; 2–1–7	Unknown
1876	West Ōzeki #1; 2–4–1; 3d	West Ōzeki #1; Retired; 0–0–10
Record given as win-loss-absent Top Division Champion Top Division Runner-up Retired Lower Divisions Key:d=Draw(s) (引分); h=Hold(s) (預り); Divisions: Makuuchi — Jūryō — Makushita — Sandanme — Jonidan — Jonokuchi Makuuchi ranks: Yokozuna — Ōzeki — Sekiwake — Komusubi — Maegashira

*Championships for the best record in a tournament were not recognized or awarded before the 1909 summer tournament, and the unofficial championships above are historically conferred. For more information, see yūshō.

== See also ==
- Glossary of sumo terms
- List of past sumo wrestlers
- List of ōzeki
