= Unryū Kyūkichi =

Japanese sumo wrestler

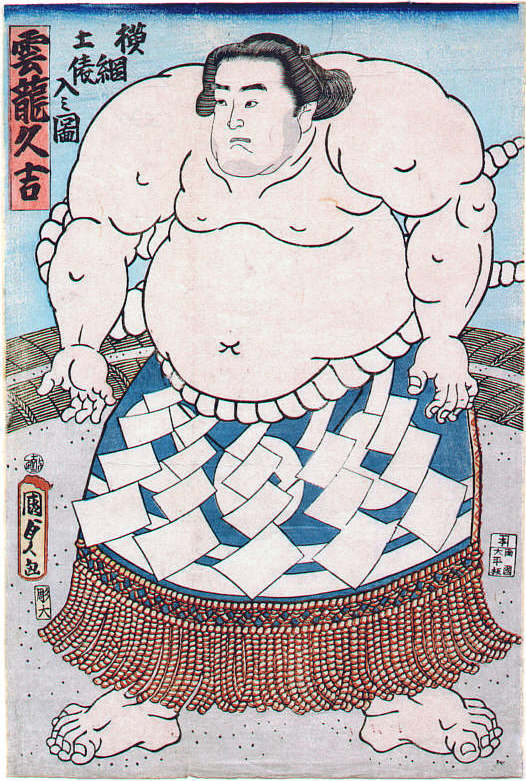
- Woodblock print of Unryū by Utagawa Kunisada II, 1864

Personal information
- Native name: 雲龍 久吉
- Born: Shiozuka Kyūkichi; 1822 Yanagawa, Chikugo, Japan
- Died: June 15, 1890 (aged 68)
- Height: 1.78 m (5 ft 10 in)
- Weight: 135 kg (298 lb)

Sport
- Sport: Sumo
- Retired: February, 1865
- Heya: Jinmaku → Oitekaze
- Record: 127-32-55; 15draws-5holds(Makuuchi)
- Debut: November, 1847
- Highest rank: Yokozuna (September 1861)
- Elder name: Oitekaze
- Championships: 7 (Makuuchi, unofficial)
- Updated on October 2007

Unryū Kyūkichi (Japanese: 雲龍 久吉; 1822 – June 15, 1890; name also read as Unryū Hisakichi) was a Japanese sumo wrestler from Yanagawa, Chikugo Province. He was the sport's 10th yokozuna. Although the name of the style of the yokozuna 's in-ring ceremony is named after him, the fact that he himself practiced this style is highly debated.

== Early life and career ==
He was born Shiozuka Kyūkichi (塩塚 久吉) in Yanagawa, Fukuoka, but would later change his name to Satō Kitarō (佐藤 喜太郎). He lost his parents and grandmother in 1833 and had to work to help his three younger siblings. In 1841, a group from Edo-sumo, led by Oitekaze (an active ōzeki who was also a stablemaster), made a tour in Kyūshū to distract people after a period of famine. They went around and spotted the young man during an amateur tournament. Kyūkichi was reluctant to step into the ring, but Oitekaze was stunned by his ability to easily take over his opponents.
He made his debut in by joining the Jinmaku stable in Osaka-sumo in the summer of 1845. He was given the shikona, or ring name, of Unryū Kyūkichi (雲龍 久吉) and never changed it. He later after moved to Edo in 1847, after being recruited by Edo-sumo ōzeki Oitekaze Kitarō. There, he wrestled for the Yanagawa Domain and was promoted to the top makuuchi division in February 1852. He was a very good fighter, but at that time, the position in the ranking was closer to a preferential treatment, so he did not receive promotions along his good performances. He won the equivalent of four consecutive tournaments. His wrestling is said to have been cautious and subdued. On the occasion of Matthew C. Perry's visit to Japan, he had an opportunity to display his wrestling prowess in a tournament Perry and his military advisors attended.

== Yokozuna ==
He was promoted to ōzeki in the January 1858 tournament, and was given a yokozuna license by the Yoshida family in the September 1861 tournament. As a yokozuna he was not known for his performance but rather his generosity, holding exhibition shows in his hometown and donating the proceeds to shrines, including a torii gate and lanterns. More than 10,000 spectators gathered, making the events the most successful since the founding of Yanagawa, Fukuoka. In the top makuuchi division, he won 127 bouts and lost 32 bouts, recording a winning percentage of 79.9.

== Retirement from sumo ==
He retired in February 1865 and took the name Oitekaze. He later led the Edo Sumo Association as its chairman, and he acquired a reputation for honesty. He continued to gift temples and notably gave their gates to the Ekō-in temple and the Asakusa Shrine. It is said that it was under his mandate that the first three yokozuna in history (Akashi Shiganosuke, Ayagawa Gorōji and Maruyama Gondazaemon) began to be considered as official wrestlers and no longer as myths of which we did not really know if they had existed. He died on June 15, 1890.

== Yokozuna in-ring ceremony ==
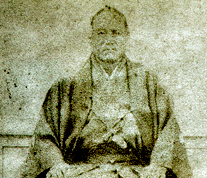
Unryū Kyūkichi as an elder

The name of one style of yokozuna dohyō-iri (the yokozuna ring-entering ceremony) came from him. His ritual choreography was said to be beautiful but it isn't proven that he performed the ritual movements in the Unryū-style. His style is said to have been imitated by Tachiyama Mineemon but Tachiyama's style is called Shiranui-style now and Unryū is credited with inventing the Shiranui-style. The common theory is that the names of the Unryū and Shiranui styles were switched. This was due to sumo scholar Kozo Hikoyama, who without researching properly, labelled Tachiyama's style as being that of Shiranui Kōemon, whereas it was in fact created by Unryū. Hikoyama was such an authority that no one contradicted him, and the Shiranui name has stuck. Some believe that the Unryū and Shiranui ring-entering ceremonies were so beautiful that only the names were retained in later generations and that the names were switched because they were not thoroughly investigated when the style were officially named. It has been determined in later years from nishiki-e and photographs, what styles Unryū and Shiranui actually performed with evidence like a nishiki-e of Unryū performing a yokozuna ring-entering with his arms extended just like the Shiranui-style and a photograph of Shiranui posing in the Unryū-style.

== Top division record ==
- The actual time the tournaments were held during the year in this period often varied.

Unryu
-	Spring	Winter
1852	East Maegashira #7; 8–0–1; 1d Unofficial	East Maegashira #3; 7–1–1; 1draw Unofficial
1853	East Maegashira #2; 6–0–2; 1d 1h Unofficial	East Maegashira #1; 8–0–2; Unofficial
1854	East Komusubi; 3–3–1; 3d	East Komusubi; 5–1–1; 2d 1h
1855	Called off due to fire	Not held
1856	East Komusubi; 4–1–4; 1h	East Sekiwake; 9–0–1; Unofficial
1857	East Sekiwake; 7–1	East Sekiwake; 7–1–1; 1h Unofficial
1858	East Ōzeki; 5–2–3	Called off due to fire
1859	East Ōzeki; 5–2–3	East Ōzeki; 3–1–4; 1d 1h
1860	East Ōzeki; 5–2–1; 2d	East Ōzeki; 5–1–1
1861	East Ōzeki; 3–1–6	East Ōzeki; 7–2–1
1862	East Ōzeki; 6–2–2	East Ōzeki; 6–1–2; 1d Unofficial
1863	East Ōzeki; 4–3–3	East Ōzeki; 5–1–1; 2d
1864	East Ōzeki; 5–3–1; 1d	East Ōzeki; 4–3–3
1865	East Ōzeki; Retired; 0–0–10	x
Record given as win-loss-absent Top Division Champion Retired Lower Divisions Key: d=Draw(s) (引分); h=Hold(s) (預り); nr=no result recorded Divisions: Makuuchi — Jūryō — Makushita — Sandanme — Jonidan — Jonokuchi Makuuchi ranks: Yokozuna (not ranked as such on banzuke until 1890); Ōzeki — Sekiwake — Komusubi — Maegashira

*Championships for the best record in a tournament were not recognized or awarded before the 1909 summer tournament and the above unofficial championships are historically conferred. For more information see yūshō.

== See also ==
- List of yokozuna
- List of past sumo wrestlers
- Glossary of sumo terms

Preceded by Hidenoyama Raigorō	10th Yokozuna; 1861–1865	Succeeded by Shiranui Kōemon
Yokozuna is not a successive rank, and more than one wrestler can hold the title at once
