= Kyukichi =

Kyukichi, Kyūkichi (久吉) is a Japanese given name and surname. Notable people with the name include:

- Kyukichi Kishida (1888–1968), Japanese zoologist
- Unryū Kyūkichi (1822–1890), Japanese sumo wrestler
