= Oitekaze Kitarō =

Japanese sumo wrestler

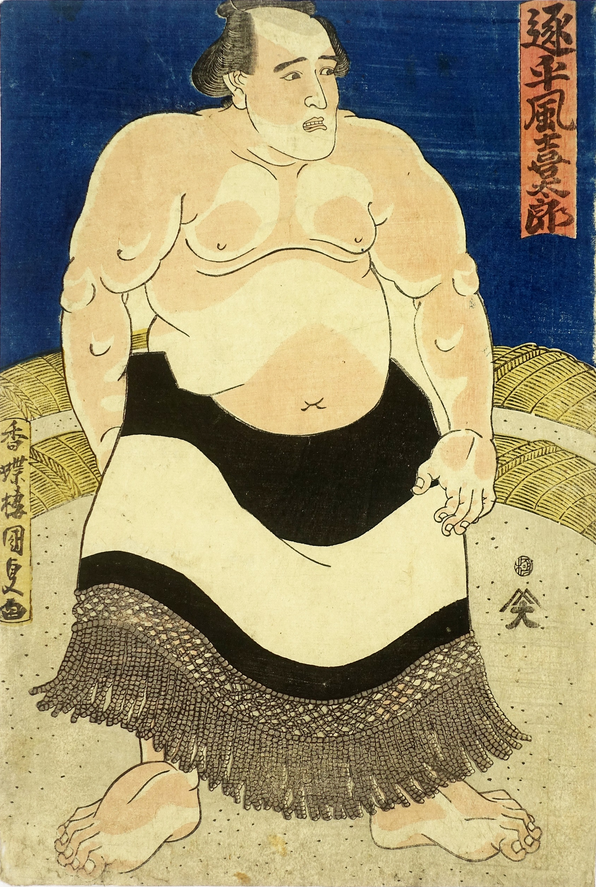
- Oitekaze by Utagawa Kunisada (c. 1832)

Personal information
- Native name: 追手風 喜太郎
- Born: Matsujirō Satō; 1799 Tsukui District, Sagami Province, Japan
- Died: May 4, 1865 (aged 65–66)

Sport
- Sport: Sumo
- Retired: March, 1839
- Heya: Oitekaze
- Record: 108-56-91-23 draws/11 holds
- Debut: October, 1817
- Highest rank: Ōzeki (November, 1836)
- Elder name: Oitekaze
- Championships: 1 (Makuuchi, unofficial)
- Updated on October 2023

Oitekaze Kitarō (Japanese: 追手風 喜太郎; born Matsujirō Satō (佐藤 松次郎, Satō Matsujirō), 1799 – May 4, 1865) was a Japanese professional sumo wrestler from Tsukui District, Sagami Province (now Sagamihara, Kanagawa Prefecture). His highest rank was ōzeki. Overall, he is the third wrestler from Kanagawa Prefecture to have been promoted to this rank and the last until the promotion of Musashiyama in 1932, 96 years later.

== Career ==
Oitekaze's interest in sumo began when the master of the Oitekaze stable, the former makushita Wadagahara Kitarō, visited his hometown during a tour, encouraging him to become a wrestler when he was just 9 years old. He began his career by being recruited directly into Oitekaze stable in October 1817. He first wrestled under the shikona, or ring name, Kuroyanagi Matsujirō (黒柳 松治郎). In October 1824, he was promoted to sumo's highest division, makuuchi. In his first tournament in that division he defeated ōzeki Kashiwado during the last three matches of the tournament and received the bow strings as a reward because he fought in the penultimate bout. In 1831, he became an elder under the name Oitekaze Kitarō (追手風 喜太郎), to inherite the stable after the death of his master in 1829. He however continued to wrestle under a two-license system.

After nine years in makuuchi, he finally began wrestling into the san'yaku ranks with a promotion to the rank of komusubi in 1834. Oitekaze went through a period of promotion and demotion in these ranks for the rest of his career. In November 1834, however, he was promoted to the rank of ōzeki directly from komusubi, as one of the champions of the time, Inazuma, sat out that tournament. As Inazuma returned to compete later that year, Oitekaze lost his rank and continued to wrestle as a sekiwake for the rest of his career, retiring in March 1839. He was a sekiwake for 12 tournaments, and although he gave off the image of a solid wrestler in the junior san'yaku ranks, he was regularly beaten by wrestlers higher up the rankings.

After his retirement, he devoted himself to training his pupils and showed great teaching skill. As a coach he raised yokozuna Unryū who later inherited the stable because he became his adopted son. As an elder, he was a prominent figure, even becoming chairman of the association from 1862 to 1864 under the name "Ikazuchi". After his term, he returned to his former position and took the Oitekaze name again. He died on 4 May 1865. His grave is located on the premises of the Kaizō-ji temple in Bunkyō, Tokyo.

Oitekaze had the reputation of being a very pious man, and after his retirement he donated several statues to the Mihashira shrine in his hometown, representing the Four Symbols, which are also protective deities in the sumo world. It used to be presented at the Sanbashira shrine festival, but was donated to Sagamihara cultural department for conservation in October 2019.

== Top division record ==
- The actual time the tournaments were held during the year in this period often varied.

Oitekaze Kitarō
-	Spring	Winter
1823	West Jūryō #7; 4–3	West Jūryō #4; 6–1; 1h
1824	West Jūryō #2; 4–3	West Maegashira #7; 4–3–3
1825	West Maegashira #7; 3–3–1; 2h	West Maegashira #6; 4–2–1; 3h
1826	West Maegashira #6; 7–1–2; Unofficial	West Maegashira #3; 2–4–3; 1d
1827	West Maegashira #4; 3–1–3	West Maegashira #2; 0–2–4
1828	Sat out	West Maegashira #1; 5–3–1; 1h
1829	West Maegashira #1; 2–2–3	West Maegashira #1; 5–0–4; 1d
1830	West Maegashira #1; 0–3–7	West Maegashira #1; 2–0–3; 3d-2h
1831	West Maegashira #1; 2–3–4; 1h	West Maegashira #1; 5–1–1; 1h
1832	Unknown	West Maegashira #1; 5–2–2; 1d
1833	West Maegashira #1; 6–1–1; 2d	West Komusubi #1; 4–2–1; 1d
1834	West Komusubi #1; 4–2–2; 2d	West Sekiwake #1; 3–3–3; 1d
1835	West Sekiwake #1; 1–3–5; 1d	West Komusubi #1; 5–0–2; 3d
1836	West Komusubi #1; 4–2	West Ōzeki #2; 4–1–4; 1d
1837	West Sekiwake #1; 3–0–7	West Sekiwake #1; 3–2–2; 3d
1838	West Sekiwake #1; 2–1–2; 1d	West Sekiwake #1; 4–1–4; 1d
1839	West Sekiwake #1; Retired; 2–1–6; 1d	x
Record given as win-loss-absent Top Division Champion Top Division Runner-up Retired Lower Divisions Key:d=Draw(s) (引分); h=Hold(s) (預り); Divisions: Makuuchi — Jūryō — Makushita — Sandanme — Jonidan — Jonokuchi Makuuchi ranks: Yokozuna — Ōzeki — Sekiwake — Komusubi — Maegashira

*Championships for the best record in a tournament were not recognized or awarded before the 1909 summer tournament and the above championships that are labelled "unofficial" are historically conferred. For more information see yūshō.

== See also ==
- Glossary of sumo terms
- List of past sumo wrestlers
- List of ōzeki
