= Genjiyama Tsunagorō =

Japanese sumo wrestler

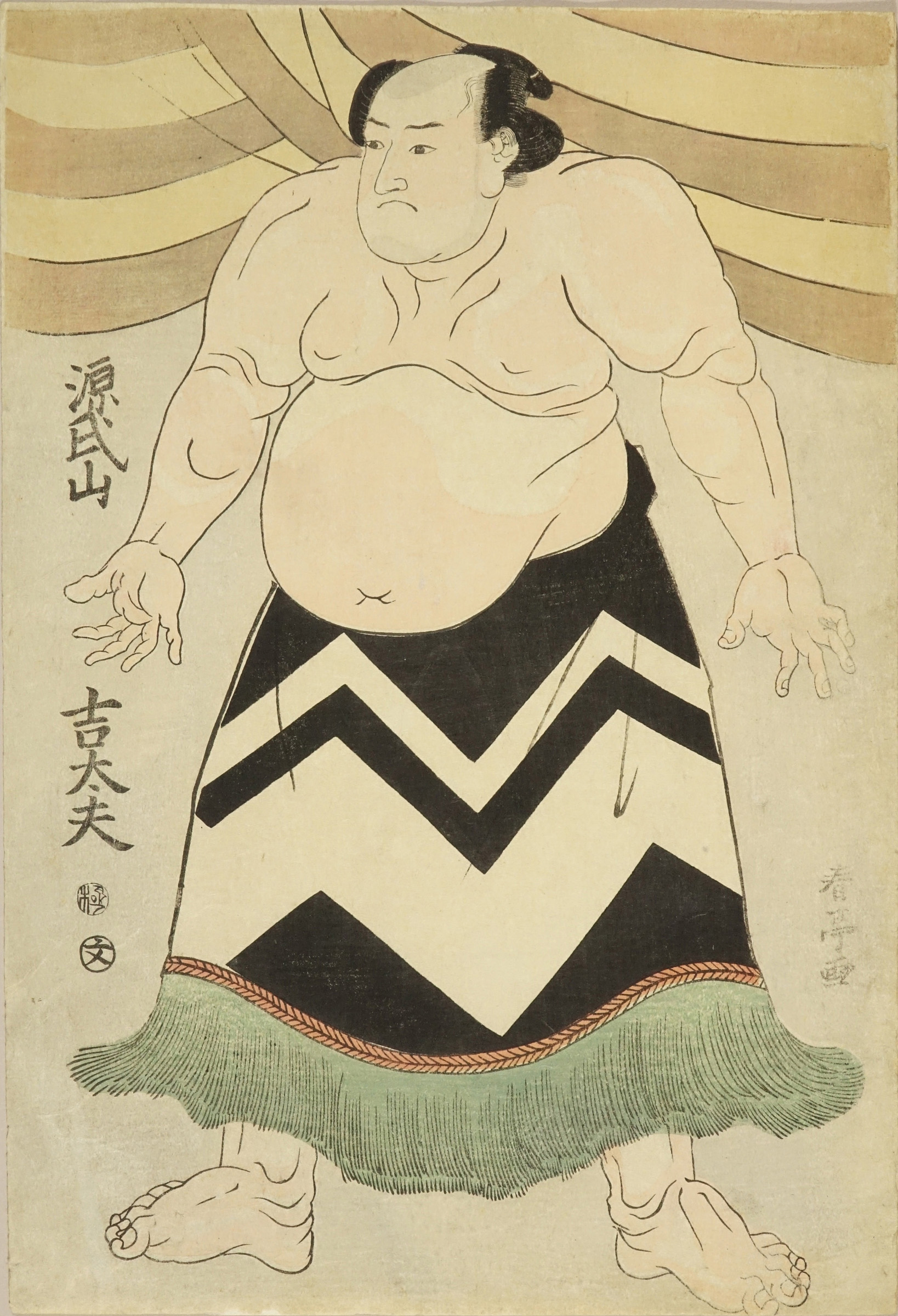
- Genjiyama Tsunagorō when he was still known as Genjiyama Kichidayū

Personal information
- Native name: 源氏山 綱五郎
- Born: Hanroku Seno; 1786 Higashimurayama District, Dewa Province, Japan
- Died: April 8, 1844 (aged 57–58)
- Height: 1.82 m (5 ft 11 1/2 in)
- Weight: 131 kg (289 lb)

Sport
- Sport: Sumo
- Retired: March, 1828
- Heya: Hidenoyama
- Record: 13-48-78-7 draws/1 hold
- Debut: November, 1807
- Highest rank: Ōzeki (October, 1825)
- Elder name: Hidenoyama
- Championships: 1 (Makuuchi, unofficial)
- Updated on October 2023

Genjiyama Tsunagorō (Japanese: 源氏山 綱五郎; born Hanroku Seno (瀬野 半六, Seno Hanroku), 1786 – April 8, 1844) was a Japanese professional sumo wrestler from Higashimurayama District, Dewa Province (now Tendō, Yamagata Prefecture). His highest rank was ōzeki. He is the third wrestler from Yamagata Prefecture to have been promoted to this rank, the first since Ichinokami Asaemon in 1802, 23 years earlier, and the last until the promotion of Asahidake in 1877, 52 years later.

== Career ==
Genjiyama was born the second son of his family. He made his professional debut within Hidenoyama stable under the tutelage of former komusubi Hidenoyama Denjirō (秀ノ山伝治郎) in November 1807. He was given the shikona, or ring name, Nawabari Tsunaemon (縄張 綱右エ門) and reached sumo's highest division, makuuchi, in November 1814. Upon promotion, he received the patronage of the Hirosaki Domain. He made his san'yaku debut as a komusubi in February 1818. Upon promotion to sekiwake in 1819 he was given the ring name Genjiyama Kichidayū (源氏山 吉太夫) by his patron because this name is associated with them.

Genjiyama remained in the junior san'yaku ranks for seven years, although he won the equivalent of a tournament in 1823. In October 1825, he was promoted to ōzeki, taking advantage of the retirement of the dominant Kashiwado, which left the ranking unbalanced. His ōzeki career was mixed, however, winning a sufficient number of victories without being able to establish himself as a dominant wrestler. He was eventually demoted in the rankings in favour of Ōnomatsu (then called Koyanagi), a dominant wrestler who had already won the equivalent of two tournaments. He retired shortly after his demotion, in March 1828.

After retiring, he assumed the name Hidenoyama and ran the eponymous stable as its second generation master. As a coach, he raised Hidenoyama, sumo's 9th yokozuna, who later inherited his stable because Genjiyama adopted him.

In December 2001, a bronze statue of him was erected in his home town near the Terazu locality. The inauguration ceremony was attended by wrestlers from the prefecture such as Kotonowaka I.

== Top division record ==
- The actual time the tournaments were held during the year in this period often varied.

Genjiyama Tsunagorō
-	Spring	Winter
1812	Unknown	East Jūryō #7; 4–2; 1d
1813	West Jūryō #2; 4–4	Sat out
1814	Unknown	West Maegashira #6; 5–1–4
1815	West Maegashira #4; 2–3–3; 2d	Unknown
1816	Unknown	West Maegashira #6; 6–1–2
1817	West Maegashira #5; 4–1–2; 1d	West Maegashira #3; 6–2
1818	West Komusubi #1; 7–1–1	West Komusubi #1; 6–1–2
1819	East Sekiwake #1; 6–2–1	East Komusubi #1; 5–2–1
1820	East Komusubi #1; 5–1	East Sekiwake #1; 6–2–1
1821	East Sekiwake #1; 6–1–1; 1d	East Sekiwake #1; 6–2–1
1822	East Sekiwake #1; 6–2–1	East Sekiwake #1; 6–2–1
1823	East Sekiwake #1; 6–1; Unofficial	Sat out
1824	East Sekiwake #1; 2–5–2; 1d	Sat out
1825	Sat out	East Ōzeki #1; 5–3–2
1826	East Ōzeki #1; 4–3–3	East Sekiwake #1; 2–3–4; 1d
1827	East Sekiwake #1; 1–0–6	West Sekiwake #1; 3–3
1828	West Maegashira #1; Retired; 0–0–10	x
Record given as win-loss-absent Top Division Champion Top Division Runner-up Retired Lower Divisions Key:d=Draw(s) (引分); h=Hold(s) (預り); Divisions: Makuuchi — Jūryō — Makushita — Sandanme — Jonidan — Jonokuchi Makuuchi ranks: Yokozuna — Ōzeki — Sekiwake — Komusubi — Maegashira

*Championships for the best record in a tournament were not recognized or awarded before the 1909 summer tournament and the above championships that are labelled "unofficial" are historically conferred. For more information see yūshō.

== See also ==
- Glossary of sumo terms
- List of past sumo wrestlers
- List of ōzeki
