= Akashi Shiganosuke =

17th-century Japanese sumo wrestler

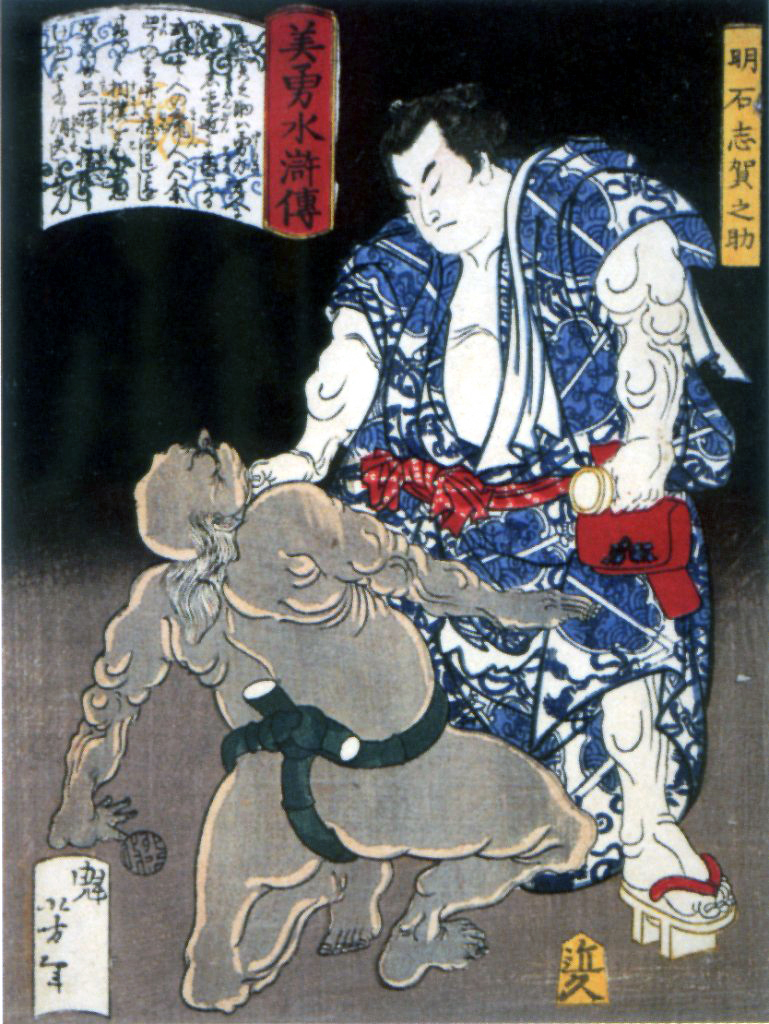
- Akashi strangling an opponent in a woodcut by Yoshitoshi

Personal information
- Native name: 明石 志賀之助
- Born: 明石 志賀之助; Akashi Shiganosuke c.1600 Utsunomiya, Tochigi prefecture, Japan
- Died: c.1649
- Height: 2.58 m (8 ft 6 in)
- Weight: 340 kg (750 lb; 54 st)

Sport
- Sport: Sumo
- Retired: c. 1643
- Record: Not physically recorded
- Debut: c. 1624
- Highest rank: Yokozuna (Posthumous Promotion)
- Updated on August 2025

Akashi Shiganosuke (Japanese: 明石 志賀之助; c. 1600 – c. 1649) is purported to be a Japanese sumo wrestler who is formally recognized as the first yokozuna. A legendary figure, his historicity is disputed. He is said to have been active in the Kan'ei era (1624–1643). He was described as being of gigantic size, at 2.58 m (8 ft 6 in) tall and weighing 340 kg (750 lb).

He is said to have been born in Utsunomiya, Tochigi prefecture in central Japan, the son of Yamanouchi Shuzen, a samurai who served Sumaura Rinemon.

According to sumo folklore, he took part in a sumo tournament in Yotsuya, Tokyo in 1624 and became an instant star, enabling sumo organisers to charge admission for the first time. He is said to have been given the title of Hinoshita Kaisan (a Buddhist term signifying a man of exceptional power) by the third Tokugawa shōgun, Iemitsu.

By 1800, his legendary reputation as a huge and powerful rikishi had been solidified, and his exploits were retold and embellished through the years. He became so legendary that when the 12th yokozuna Jinmaku Kyugoro came to compile the first list of yokozuna in 1900, Akashi was placed at the beginning, followed by two dominant champions from the Edo period, Ayagawa Goroji and Maruyama Gondazaemon. Despite this, Tanikaze was the first to receive a yokozuna licence and perform the yokozuna dohyo-iri and so is often regarded as the first "real" yokozuna.

== See also ==
- Glossary of sumo terms
- List of past sumo wrestlers
- List of yokozuna

Preceded by –	1st Yokozuna	Succeeded by Ayagawa Gorōji
Yokozuna is not a successive rank, and more than one wrestler can hold the title at once
