= Sakaigawa Namiemon I =

Japanese sumo wrestler (born 1819)

Sakaigawa Namiemon
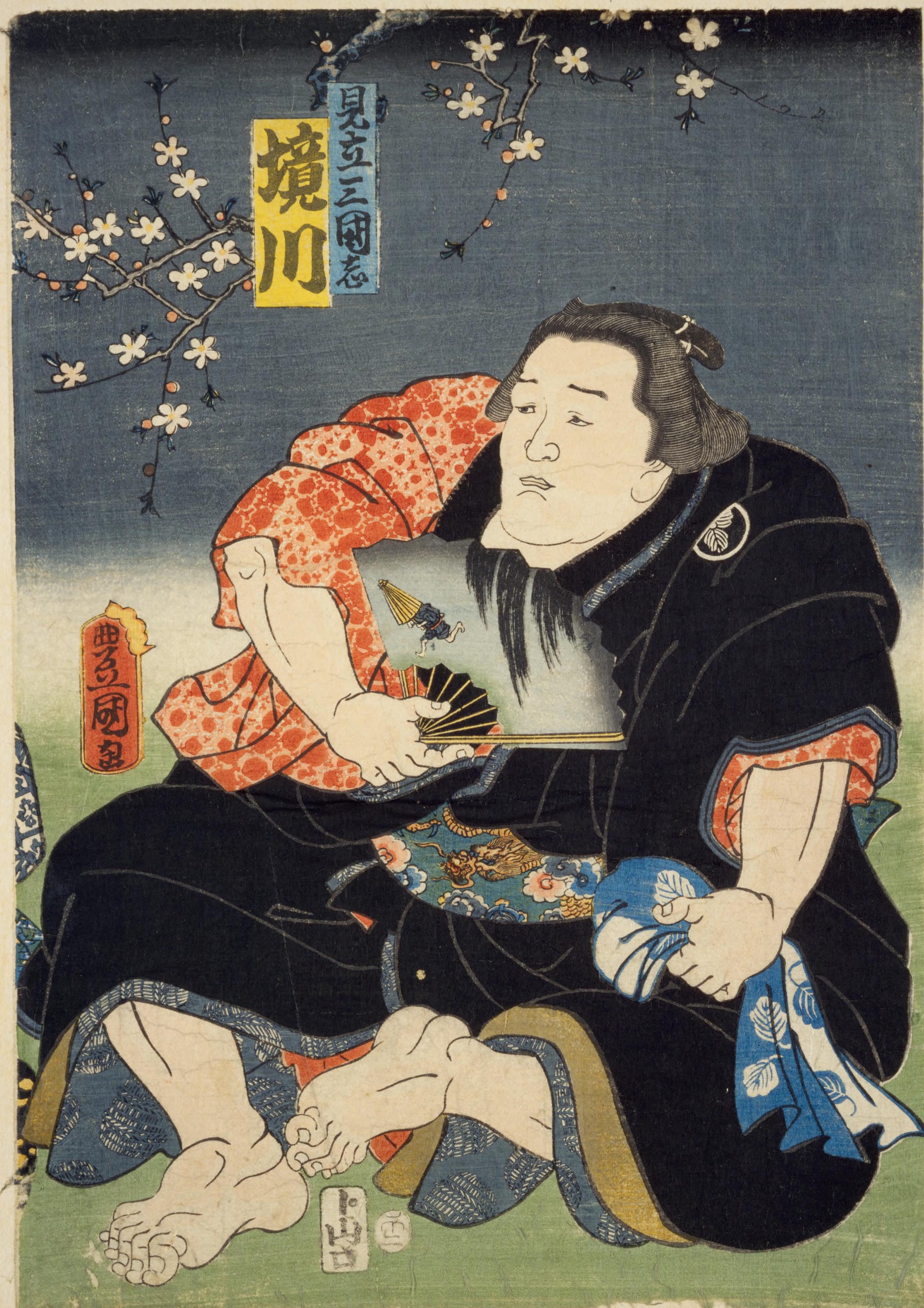

Personal information
- Native name: 境川 浪右衛門 (初代)
- Born: Genjirō Furumura; 1819 Kuwana District, Shima Province, Japan
- Died: September 8, 1867 (aged 47–48)
- Height: 1.90 m (6 ft 3 in)
- Weight: 140 kg (310 lb)

Sport
- Sport: Sumo
- Retired: October, 1861
- Heya: Mihogaseki → Sakaigawa
- Record: 123-38-40-11 draws/2 holds
- Debut: October, 1843
- Highest rank: Ōzeki (November, 1857)
- Elder name: Sakaigawa
- Championships: 2 (Makuuchi, unofficial)
- Updated on September 2023

Sakaigawa Namiemon (Japanese: 境川浪右衛門; born Genjirō Furumura (古村 源次郎, Furumura Genjirō), 1819 – September 8, 1867) was a Japanese sumo wrestler from Kuwana District, Shima Province (now Kuwana, Mie Prefecture). His highest rank was ōzeki. He was the first wrestler from Mie prefecture to reach this rank and the only titleholder before Mienoumi's promotion in 1976, 119 years later.

== Career ==
Little is known about Sakaigawa who, despite having attained the rank of ōzeki, is often overshadowed by his apprentice and illustrious successor in the name of Sakaigawa, the 14th yokozuna Sakaigawa Namiemon.

Sakaigawa began his wrestling career with the Mihogaseki stable in the Osaka-based sumo association. Eventually, he decided to leave Osaka and move to Edo, being recruited by the Sakaigawa stable, run by former maegashira Kimigatake, in 1843. That same year he fought for the first time in October under the shikona, or ring name, Masuizan Iwanosuke (増位山 岩之助). He reached the makuuchi division in March 1850 and established himself as a good wrestler, winning the equivalent of two tournaments between 1851 and 1856. However, as the yūshō system was not introduced until 1909, these championship victories are now considered unofficial. According to sources, he scouted a young boy who worked at a liquor store, hence persuading future-yokozuna Sakaigawa Namiemon to become a professional wrestler, between 1847 or 1857. In February 1851 he was given the ring name Mutsugamine Iwanosuke (六ツヶ峰 岩之助). In 1854, he made his san'yaku debut, being promoted at komusubi.

In 1856, he officially inherited the Sakaigawa stable from his master, who had died two years earlier. He then took the name Sakaigawa Namiemon (境川浪右衛門) and continued to wrestle while looking after his apprentices under the two-licence system. In November 1857 he was the first wrestler in Mie Prefecture to be promoted to the rank of ōzeki. In total, he held the rank of ōzeki for three years. Sakaigawa decided to retire in October 1861, devoting himself entirely to training his wrestlers.

Sakaigawa died on 8 September 1867. As a master, he raised Sakaigawa (then known as Masuizan), who reached the rank of yokozuna in 1877, into the makuuchi division. His stable remained without a master for some time, but was probably led by Sakaigawa II, who renamed himself Sakaigawa Namiemon in 1870, three years after the death of his master, officially inheriting the stable.

== Top division record ==
- The actual time the tournaments were held during the year in this period often varied.

Sakaigawa Namiemon I
| - | Spring | Summer |
|---|---|---|
| 1848 | Jūryō #30 – | Jūryō #30 – |
| 1849 | East Jūryō #10; 7–2 | East Jūryō #2; 5–1 |
| 1850 | East Maegashira #7; 5–2–2; 1d | East Maegashira #7; 7–2–1 |
| 1851 | West Maegashira #6; 2–1–1; 1d | West Maegashira #6; 7–1–1; 1d Unofficial |
| 1852 | West Maegashira #3; 5–1–3; 1d | West Maegashira #3; 7–2–1 |
| 1853 | West Maegashira #2; 5–1–1; 1d-1h | West Maegashira #2; 2–1–7 |
| 1854 | West Maegashira #2; 6–1–3 | West Komusubi #1; 4–3–2; 1d |
| 1855 | Sat out | Unknown |
| 1856 | West Komusubi #1; 8–0–1; 1d Unofficial | West Sekiwake #1; 7–1–1; 1d |
| 1857 | West Sekiwake #1; 6–1; 1d | West Ōzeki #1; 7–2–1 |
| 1858 | West Sekiwake #1; 2–5–3 | Sat out |
| 1859 | West Ōzeki #1; 6–2–2 | West Ōzeki #1; 5–2–2; 1h |
| 1860 | West Ōzeki #1; 6–3–1 | West Ōzeki #1; 4–1–1; 1d |
| 1861 | West Ōzeki #1; 4–1–4; 1d | West Ōzeki #1; Retired; 6–2–2 |
Record given as win-loss-absent Top Division Champion Top Division Runner-up Retired Lower Divisions Key:d=Draw(s) (引分); h=Hold(s) (預り); Divisions: Makuuchi — Jūryō — Makushita — Sandanme — Jonidan — Jonokuchi Makuuchi ranks: Yokozuna — Ōzeki — Sekiwake — Komusubi — Maegashira

*Championships for the best record in a tournament were not recognized or awarded before the 1909 summer tournament and the above championships that are labelled "unofficial" are historically conferred. For more information see yūshō.

== See also ==
- Glossary of sumo terms
- List of past sumo wrestlers
- List of ōzeki
