= Kimenzan Tanigorō =

Japanese sumo wrestler

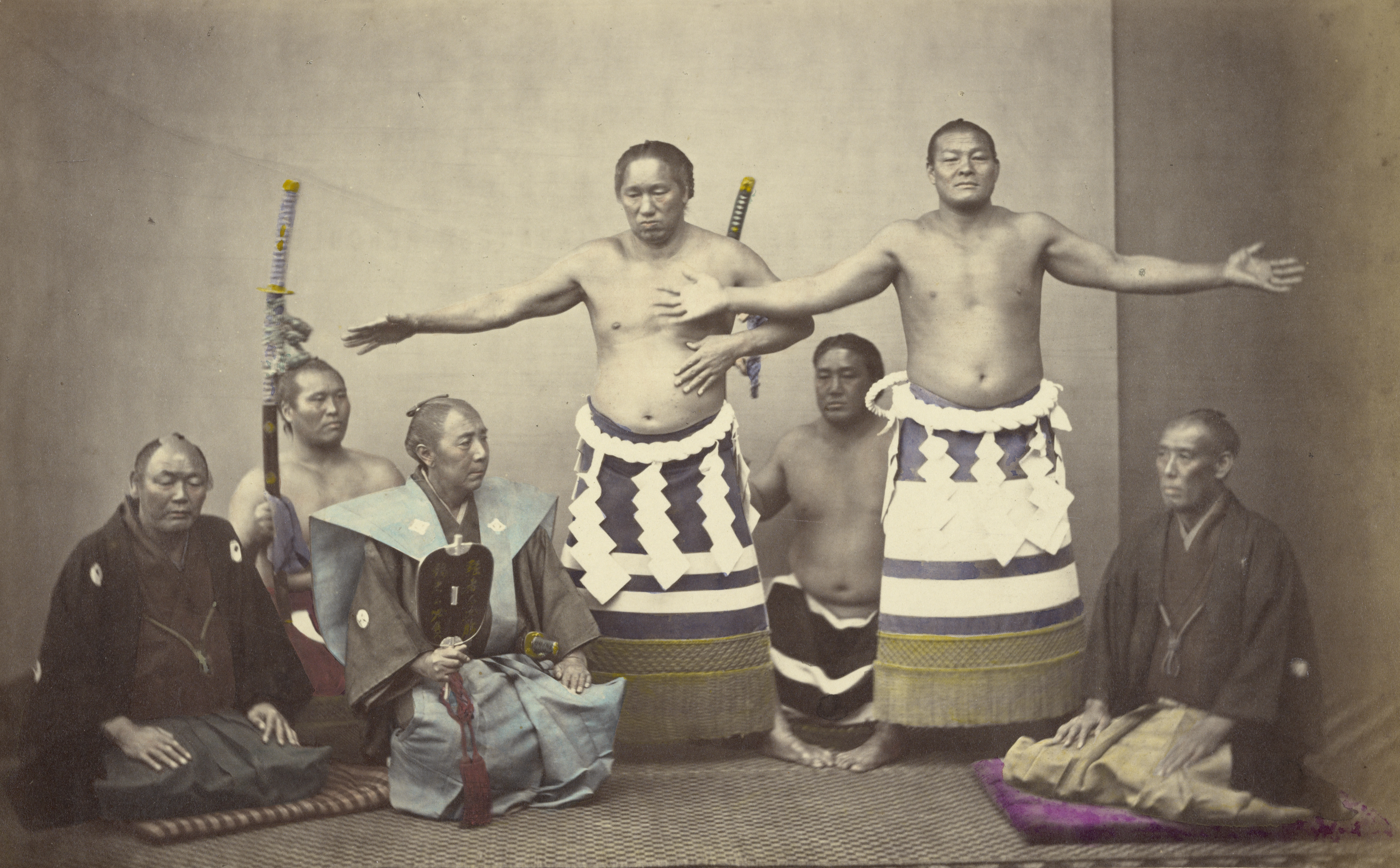
- Shiranui (left) and Kimenzan (right) in 1869

Personal information
- Native name: 鬼面山 谷五郎
- Born: Tanaka Shin'ichi; 1826 Washizu District, Mino, Japan
- Died: September 7, 1871 (aged 45)
- Height: 1.86 m (6 ft 1 in)
- Weight: 140 kg (310 lb)

Sport
- Sport: Sumo
- Retired: November, 1870
- Heya: Takekuma
- Record: 143-24-63; 16draws-8holds(Makuuchi)
- Debut: February 1852
- Highest rank: Yokozuna (April 1869)
- Elder name: Kimenzan
- Championships: 7 (Makuuchi, unofficial)
- Updated on June 2020

Kimenzan Tanigorō (鬼面山 谷五郎; 1826? – September 7, 1871) was a Japanese professional sumo wrestler. He was the sport's 13th yokozuna and the first to be promoted during the Meiji era.

== Career ==
Kimenzan was born in Washizu District, Mino Province (now Yōrō, Gifu Prefecture). His real name was Tanaka Shin'ichi (田中 新一). He was born to a family that ran a farm. While serving as a stone-carrier, he grew in strength and decided to enter Takekuma stable at age 13, under the tutelage of former Edo-sumo ōzeki Kotōzan.
In the February 1852 tournament, he stepped in the ring for the first time under the shikona, or ring name, Hamaikari (濱碇) before changing it to Iyatakayama (彌高山). At this time, he was known as one of the "Four Heavenly Kings of Awa" along with Jinmaku, Onaruto and Nijigatake, all of whom were rikishi in the Tokushima domain. At the time, wrestlers were appointed as vassals of feudal lords, having a status similar to that of a samurai as well as being the champions of the feudal domain to which they were linked. However, because Jinmaku later switched to the Matsue Domain and then Satsuma Domain, it is said that Kimenzan and Jinmaku developed a strong rivalry which resulted in several "grudge matches".
He was promoted to ōzeki in November 1865. However, he was unenrolled in the November 1866 banzuke. It was reportedly because he had a quarrel with sumo elders. He was promoted to ōzeki again in June 1868. In the February 1869 tournament, he was the first wrestler of the Meiji era to be granted a yokozuna license by the Yoshida family. He was already 43 years old, making him the oldest yokozuna to be promoted in the history of sumo. Because of his age, he did not have a long career as a yokozuna, and retired from the ring only in November 1870. He was known for his strong offensive attack from a solid right-hand stance, but even when he established a solid position, his attack itself sometimes seemed forced, and thus he was often left behind. His record since his license was 17 wins, 3 losses, 2 draws, 14 holds. In the top makuuchi division, he won 143 bouts and lost 24 bouts, recording a winning percentage of 85.6. Because of his rank of yokozuna, he was given the privilege of being an ichidai-toshiyori under his shikona. He died on September 7, 1871, less than a year after his retirement, at the age of 46. His grave can be found in the Tokurin-ji temple, in his hometown of Yōrō, Gifu.

== Homage ==
There is a monument to him in Yōrō, Gifu.

== Top division record ==
- The actual time the tournaments were held during the year in this period often varied.

Kimenzan Tanigorō
-	Spring	Winter
1857	East Maegashira #7; 8–0–2	East Maegashira #4; 6–2–2
1858	East Maegashira #2; 8–0–2; Unofficial	Called off due to fire
1859	East Komusubi; 8–0–1; 1h Unofficial	East Komusubi; 6–2–2
1860	East Komusubi; 8–1–1	East Komusubi; 6–0–1; Unofficial
1861	East Komusubi; 3–1–5; 1h	East Komusubi; 6–1–3
1862	East Komusubi; 6–1–2; 1d	East Sekiwake; 6–3–1
1863	East Sekiwake; 7–0–1; 1d 1h Unofficial	East Sekiwake; 7–0–2; 2d Unofficial
1864	East Sekiwake; 5–0–3; 2d	East Sekiwake; 5–3–2
1865	East Sekiwake; 5–2–2; 1h	East Ōzeki; 4–0–3; 3d 1h
1866	East Ōzeki; 7–0–1; 1d 1h Unofficial	Not enrolled
1867	East Komusubi; 5–0–1; 3d 1h	East Komusubi; 4–0–5; 1d
1868	West Ōzeki; 1–2–6; 1h	West Ōzeki; 9–0–1; Unofficial
1869	West Ōzeki; 7–2–1	West Ōzeki; 6–0–2; 2d
1870	West Ōzeki; 4–1–5	West Ōzeki; Retired; 0–0–10
Record given as win-loss-absent Top Division Champion Retired Lower Divisions Key: d=Draw(s) (引分); h=Hold(s) (預り); nr=no result recorded Divisions: Makuuchi — Jūryō — Makushita — Sandanme — Jonidan — Jonokuchi Makuuchi ranks: Yokozuna (not ranked as such on banzuke until 1890); Ōzeki — Sekiwake — Komusubi — Maegashira

*Championships for the best record in a tournament were not recognized or awarded before the 1909 summer tournament and the above unofficial championships are historically conferred. For more information see yūshō.

== See also ==
- Glossary of sumo terms
- List of past sumo wrestlers
- List of yokozuna

Preceded by Jinmaku Kyūgorō	13th Yokozuna; 1869–1870	Succeeded by Sakaigawa Namiemon
Yokozuna is not a successive rank, and more than one wrestler can hold the title at once
