= Ayagawa Gorōji =

Japanese sumo wrestler

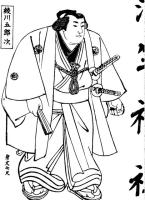
- A woodblock print of Ayagawa

Personal information
- Native name: 綾川 五郎次
- Born: 綾川 五郎次; Ayagawa Gorōji; 1703 Tochigi prefecture, Japan
- Died: March 14, 1765
- Height: 2 m (6 ft 7 in)
- Weight: 150 kg (330 lb; 24 st)

Sport
- Sport: Sumo
- Record: Not physically recorded
- Debut: circa 1717
- Highest rank: Yokozuna (Posthumous Promotion)
- Updated on August 2025

Ayagawa Gorōji (Japanese: 綾川 五郎次; c. 1703 – March 14, 1765) was a Japanese sumo wrestler, who is formally recognised as the second yokozuna.

Ayagawa came from Tochigi prefecture and was promoted to ōzeki in 1717. According to tradition, he was the strongest wrestler in the Genbun era. He was a famous sumo wrestler in Edo, Osaka and Kyoto. The 17th Oikaze of the Yoshida family, allowed Ayagawa to be his pupil. Very little is known about his sumo career. He was of legendary size, perhaps 2 m (6 ft 7 in) tall and 150 kg (330 lb) in weight.

He died on March 14, 1765. His grave can be found in Tochigi.

It was not until over 150 years after his death that he was recognised as the 2nd yokozuna by later yokozuna Jinmaku when he was compiling a formal list for a monument.

His career predates banzuke and tournament records so no record of his rank and bouts exists.

== See also ==
- Glossary of sumo terms
- List of past sumo wrestlers
- List of yokozuna

Preceded by Akashi Shiganosuke	2nd Yokozuna	Succeeded by Maruyama Gondazaemon
Yokozuna is not a successive rank, and more than one wrestler can hold the title at once
