= Sakaigawa Namiemon =

Japanese sumo wrestler (born 1841)

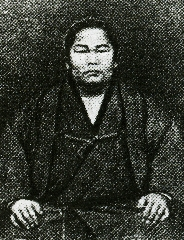

Personal information
- Native name: 境川 浪右衛門
- Born: Udagawa Masakichi; May 28, 1841 Katsushika District, Shimōsa, Japan
- Died: September 16, 1887 (aged 46)
- Height: 1.68 m (5 ft 6 in)
- Weight: 128 kg (282 lb)

Sport
- Sport: Sumo
- Retired: January, 1881
- Heya: Sakaigawa
- Record: 118–23–63; 71 draws-5 holds (Makuuchi)
- Debut: November, 1857
- Highest rank: Yokozuna (February 1877)
- Elder name: Sakaigawa
- Championships: 5 (Makuuchi, unofficial)
- Updated on July 2008

Sakaigawa Namiemon (境川 浪右衛門; May 28, 1841 – September 16, 1887) was a Japanese professional sumo wrestler from Katsushika District, Shimōsa Province. He was the sport's 14th yokozuna. Nicknamed "Tanikaze of the Meiji era", he's the only officially recognized yokozuna of the "yokozuna abuse era" following the fall of the Tokugawa shogunate.

== Early life and career ==
He was born Udagawa Masakichi (宇田川 政吉). At the age of 13, he went to work for a sake wholesaler in Shinkawa, Edo (now located in Chūō, Tokyo). It is said that he was encouraged to join sumo when the owner, who saw Masakichi carrying a large barrel with ease, and who loved sumo, enthusiastically told him to become a wrestler. Masakichi joined the Sakaigawa stable where he was trained by the eponymous ōzeki (who held that rank from 1857 to 1861) and began his career in November 1857. He reached the top makuuchi division in April 1867. Masakichi adopted the shikona, or ring name, of Konishikawa (小西川) before changing it for Shihoyama (四方山) and Masuizan (増位山). Both shikona were inspired by the name of his previous employer's shop, and by the name of a famous sake brewery. Shihoyama brewery also purchased a new keshō-mawashi set.

Despite his small stature, Sakaigawa had a drum belly and a strong body, and rose steadily through the ranks. During his time in the makuuchi ranks, he did not suddenly defeat any opponent, but rather allowed his opponent to wrestle sufficiently before going on to win the match, and his opponents were impressed by his ring attitude even after his defeat. He won the equivalent of his first tournament championship in June 1868 from the maegashira ranks, emerging undefeated with eight wins (though this was before the championship system established in 1909). He was promoted to ōzeki in April 1870 after winning two tournaments in a row from the rank of sekiwake. Following his promotion, he changed his ring name to Sakaigawa Namiemon (境川 浪右衛門) and became the head of his stable while still competing.

== Yokozuna ==
In 1877, the Emperor Meiji was scheduled to hold a tournament at the Shimazu clan's residence in Azabu, Tokyo. In February of the same year, he was invited to a Gojō family Sumo tournament in Osaka.

Sakaigawa was initially offered a yokozuna licence by the Osaka based Gojō family and he was admitted as a yokozuna by the Yoshida family in February 1877. However the civil war forced the cancellation of the sumo tournaments. The head of the Yoshida family (the 23rd Yoshida Oikaze) surrendered after fighting against Saigō Takamori's forces, and the Yoshida family was unable to grant a yokozuna license to Sakaigawa. The authority of the Yoshida family fell because of these events, and since the fall of the Tokugawa shogunate, the Gojō family of Osaka has been thriving, producing an incomprehensible abundance of yokozuna. Sakaigawa was promoted yokozuna during this period of turmoil, and he was the only yokozuna to be officially recognized at the end of that period of "overproduced yokozuna", known as the "yokozuna abuse era" (横綱濫造時代). His record after being licensed as yokozuna was 20 wins, 8 losses, 20 draws, 3 holds, and 30 absences. In the top makuuchi division, he won 118 bouts and lost 23 bouts, recording a winning percentage of 83.7. However, he also recorded 71 draws because he often let his opponent attack first.

== Retirement from sumo and death ==
Sakaigawa retired in January 1881 and became a full time stablemaster at Sakaigawa stable. In 1870, he had married his master's daughter allowing him to inherit both the Sakaigawa name and the stable. He developed drinking problems and died on September 16, 1887.

== Top division record ==
- The actual time the tournaments were held during the year in this period often varied. The spring tournament recorded for 1878 was actually held in December of the previous year.

Sakaigawa
-	Spring	Winter
1867	West Maegashira #6; 4–1–1; 4d	West Maegashira #4; 4–1–1; 4d
1868	East Maegashira #2; 8–0–1 d1 Unofficial	East Komusubi; 4–2–1; 3d
1869	East Sekiwake; 8–0–1; 1d Unofficial	East Sekiwake; 7–0–1; 2d Unofficial
1870	East Ōzeki; 6–0–2; 2d Unofficial	East Ōzeki; 6–1–1; 2d
1871	East Ōzeki; 5–0–2	East Ōzeki; 6–0–2; 1d 1h Unofficial
1872	East Ōzeki; 4–1–1; 4d	East Ōzeki; 3–1–1; 5d
1873	East Ōzeki; 6–0–1; 3d	East Ōzeki; 3–2–2; 3d
1874	East Ōzeki; 4–1–1; 3d 1h	East Ōzeki; 6–1–1; 2d
Record given as win-loss-absent Top Division Champion Retired Lower Divisions Key: d=Draw(s) (引分); h=Hold(s) (預り); nr=no result recorded Divisions: Makuuchi — Jūryō — Makushita — Sandanme — Jonidan — Jonokuchi Makuuchi ranks: Yokozuna (not ranked as such on banzuke until 1890); Ōzeki — Sekiwake — Komusubi — Maegashira

-	Spring	Summer
1875	East Ōzeki; 4–1–2; 3d	Not held
1876	East Ōzeki; 6–1–1; 2d	East Ōzeki; 4–2–1; 3d
1877	East Ōzeki; 4–0–6	East Ōzeki; 4–2–1; 3d
1878	East Ōzeki; 4–1–2; 2d 1h	East Ōzeki; 3–1–2; 3d 1h
1879	East Ōzeki; 1–1–3; 5d	East Ōzeki; 2–2–1; 4d 1h
1880	Sat out	East Ōzeki; 2–1–4; 3d
1881	East Ōzeki; Retired; 0–0–10	x
Record given as win-loss-absent Top Division Champion Retired Lower Divisions Key: d=Draw(s) (引分); h=Hold(s) (預り); nr=no result recorded Divisions: Makuuchi — Jūryō — Makushita — Sandanme — Jonidan — Jonokuchi Makuuchi ranks: Yokozuna (not ranked as such on banzuke until 1890); Ōzeki — Sekiwake — Komusubi — Maegashira

Championships for the best record in a tournament were not recognized or awarded before the 1909 summer tournament and the above unofficial championships are historically conferred. For more information see yūshō.

== See also ==
- Glossary of sumo terms
- List of past sumo wrestlers
- List of yokozuna

Preceded by Kimenzan Tanigorō	14th Yokozuna; 1877–1880	Succeeded by Umegatani Tōtarō I
Yokozuna is not a successive rank, and more than one wrestler can hold the title at once
