= Hidenoyama Raigorō =

Japanese sumo wrestler

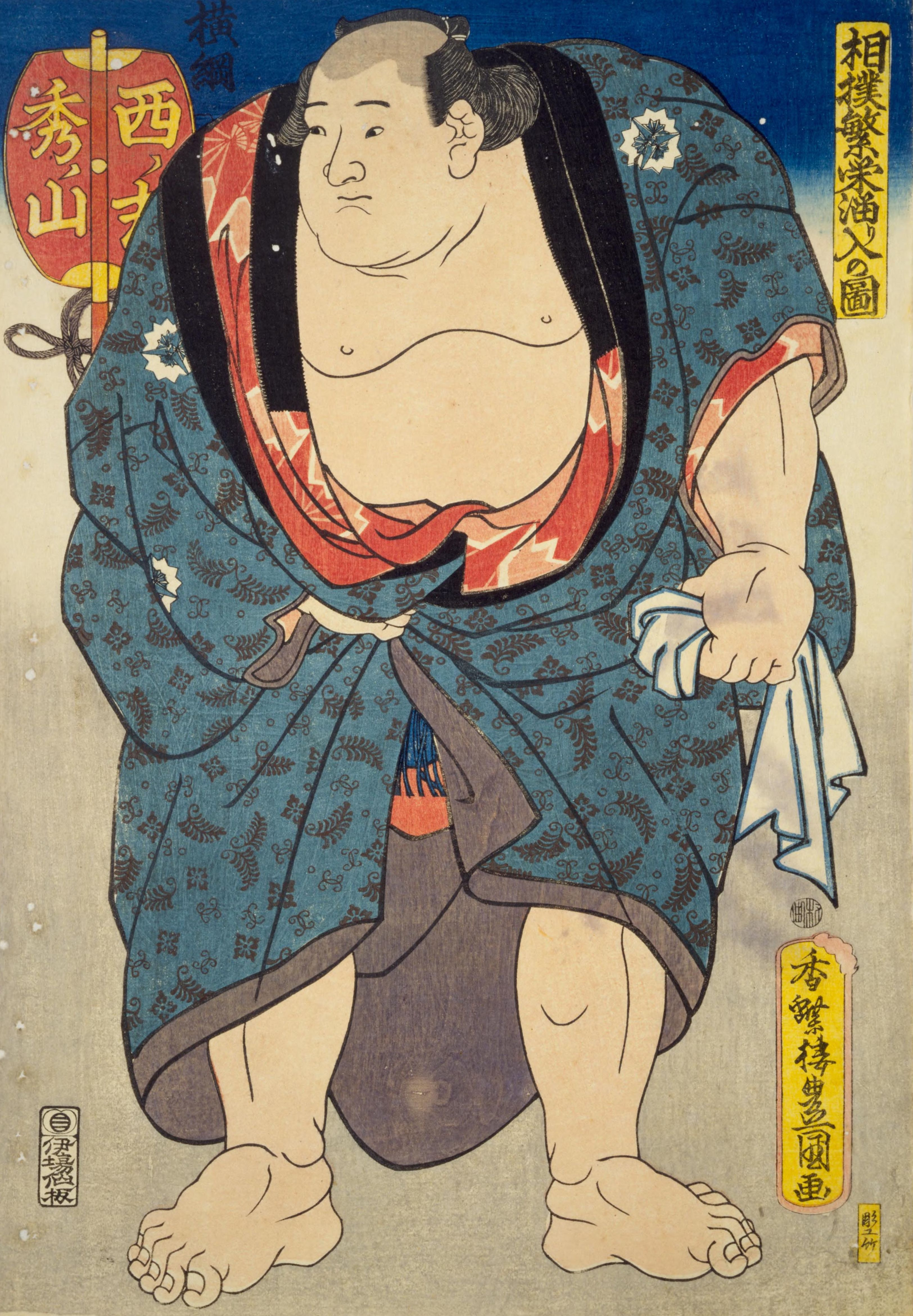
- Woodblock print of Hidenoyama by Kunisada, circa 1850

Personal information
- Native name: 秀ノ山 雷五郎
- Born: Kikuta Tatsugorō; 1808 Kesennuma, Mutsu, Japan
- Died: June 16, 1862 (aged 54)
- Height: 1.64 m (5 ft 5 in)
- Weight: 135 kg (298 lb)

Sport
- Sport: Sumo
- Retired: March, 1850
- Heya: Sekinoto → Hidenoyama
- Record: 112-21-96; 33draws-2holds (Makuuchi)
- Debut: March, 1828
- Highest rank: Yokozuna (September 1847)
- Elder name: Hidenoyama
- Championships: 6 (Makuuchi, unofficial)
- Updated on October 2007

Hidenoyama Raigorō (秀ノ山 雷五郎; 1808 – June 16, 1862) was a Japanese sumo wrestler from Kesennuma, Mutsu Province. He was the sport's 9th yokozuna.

== Career ==
Born Kikuta Tatsugorō (菊田 辰五郎), he later took the surname Hashimoto (橋本). He aspired to become a rikishi because his second brother was an ōzeki. In 1823, he attempted to make his debut in Sekinoto stable, but he was completely ignored by his master (komusubi Arakuma Rikinosuke) due to his short height of only 1.51 m (4 ft 11 1/2 in), and did nothing but chores and was not allowed to train or even step in the ring. He joined Hidenoyama stable, led by ōzeki Genjiyama, in 1827 and made his debut in March 1828, under the shikona, or ring name, Kitayama Tatsugorō (北山 辰五郎). Then, he wrestled for the Matsuidara clan under the shikona Amatsukaze Kumoemon (天津風 雲右衛門). Due to the poor financial situation of the Matsuidara clan, he was removed from his position around 1827. After reaching the rank of sekiwake he was given the shikona Tatsugami Kumoemon (立神 雲右衞門) and reached ōzeki. However, it is said that his promotion was more of a fill-in for Shiranui's repeated failures to appear, and he was dropped back at sekiwake. In 1844, after he was promoted back to ōzeki he changed his shikona twice by taking the name of Iwamigata Jōemon (岩見潟 丈右衞門) and then succeeding to his master by taking the name Hidenoyama Raigorō (秀ノ山 雷五郎).

== Yokozuna ==
He received his yokozuna licence from the Yoshida family in September 1845. His height of 1.64 m (5 ft 4 1/2 in) is lowest among all yokozuna in sumo's long history. He was not one of the greatest wrestlers of his time, but received the licence because he had influential backers and is even sometimes assimilated as a full member of the Yoshida family. Ōzeki Tsurugizan Taniemon reportedly handed over the yokozuna licence to Hidenoyama.

== Retirement from sumo ==
He retired in March 1850, as he was 41 or 42 years old at the time, and is said to have performed in the yokozuna ring-entering ceremony until 1861. He recorded 30 consecutive wins and won the equivalent of six championships before the modern yūshō system was established. In the top makuuchi division, he won 112 bouts and lost 21 bouts, recording a winning percentage of 84.2. After his retirement, he was an elder known as Hidenoyama and later trained yokozuna Jinmaku and ōzeki Ayasegawa. Hidenoyama died in June, 1862 and sekiwake Kasagiyama (笠置山) succeeded the name Hidenoyama.

=== The "Kaei turmoil" ===
Hidenoyama served as a judge (naka-aratame, modern shimpan) but this gave him many opportunities to give favourable decisions to his own pupils. At that time, there were many lower division wrestlers and they were sometimes forced to be absent from sumo bouts. They attempted to have their number of sumo bouts increased. He had the right of deciding their attendances and rejected this, excluding his own pupils. The other lower ranking wrestlers were angry, accusing him of bias, and went on strike because of his practices in 1851. It was the first walkout in sumo history and the event is now known as the 'Kaei turmoil' (嘉永の紛擾). Hidenoyama eventually apologized to the wrestlers.

== Fighting style ==
He was not good at wrestling against skillful wrestlers like sekiwake Inagawa (稲川) and ōzeki Tsurugizan, but he was able to compensate for his small size, roundness and fragility by training hard. He is also said to have a great fighting spirit.

== Homage ==
A 10-ton bronze statue of Hidenoyama was erected in Kesennuma, Miyagi Prefecture, at the entrance of the bay. In 2011, the statue became a symbol of resilience after surviving the Great East Japan Earthquake.

== Top division record ==
- The actual time the tournaments were held during the year in this period often varied.

Hidenoyama
-	Spring	Winter
1837	West Maegashira #7; 4–1–5	West Maegashira #4; 0–3–5; 2d
1838	West Maegashira #4; 3–0–3	West Maegashira #4; 8–0–1; 1h Unofficial
1839	West Maegashira #1; 7–0–2; 1d Unofficial	West Komusubi; 6–0–2; 2d Unofficial
1840	West Sekiwake; 7–1–1; 1d	West Sekiwake; 5–1–2; 2d
1841	West Ōzeki; 6–1–2; 1d	West Ōzeki; 5–2; 1d
1842	West Ōzeki; 3–2–1; 4d	West Sekiwake; 5–1–1; 3d
1843	West Sekiwake; 5–0–4; 1d Unofficial	West Sekiwake; 5–1–3; 1d
1844	West Sekiwake; 5–1–2; 2d	West Ōzeki; 8–0–2; Unofficial
1845	West Ōzeki; 6–0–2; 2d Unofficial	West Ōzeki; 6–1–2; 1d
1846	West Ōzeki; 2–0–7; 1d	Sat out
1847	West Ōzeki; 3–3–1; 3d	West Ōzeki; 4–0–3; 3d
1848	West Ōzeki; 4–2–3; 1d	West Ōzeki; 5–1–2; 1d 1h
1849	Sat out	Sat out
1850	West Ōzeki; Retired; 0–0–10	x
Record given as win-loss-absent Top Division Champion Retired Lower Divisions Key: d=Draw(s) (引分); h=Hold(s) (預り); nr=no result recorded Divisions: Makuuchi — Jūryō — Makushita — Sandanme — Jonidan — Jonokuchi Makuuchi ranks: Yokozuna (not ranked as such on banzuke until 1890); Ōzeki — Sekiwake — Komusubi — Maegashira

*Championships for the best record in a tournament were not recognized or awarded before the 1909 summer tournament and the above unofficial championships are historically conferred. For more information see yūshō.

== See also ==
- Glossary of sumo terms
- List of past sumo wrestlers
- List of yokozuna

Preceded by Shiranui Dakuemon	9th Yokozuna; 1847–1850	Succeeded by Unryū Kyūkichi
Yokozuna is not a successive rank, and more than one wrestler can hold the title at once
