= Shiranui Kōemon =

Japanese sumo wrestler

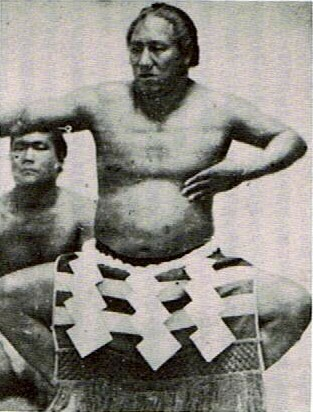

Personal information
- Native name: 不知火 光右衛門
- Born: Harano Minematsu; 3 March 1825 Kikuchi, Higo, Japan
- Died: 24 February 1879 (aged 53)
- Height: 1.76 m (5 ft 9 in)
- Weight: 124 kg (273 lb)

Sport
- Sport: Sumo
- Retired: November 1869
- Heya: Minato → Sakaigawa
- Record: 119-35-75; 15draws-9holds(Makuuchi)
- Debut: November, 1850
- Highest rank: Yokozuna (October 1863)
- Elder name: Shiranui
- Championships: 3 (Makuuchi, unofficial)
- Updated on October 2007

Shiranui Kōemon (不知火 光右衛門; 3 March 1825 – 24 February 1879) was a Japanese professional sumo wrestler from Kikuchi, Higo Province. He was the sport's 11th yokozuna. He gives his name to one of the two styles for the yokozuna's in-ring ceremony, although the question of whether he himself practiced this style is highly debated.

== Early life and career ==
Born Harano Minematsu (原野 峰松), he later changed his surname to Chikahisa (近久). He was born in March 1825 (in now Kumamoto Prefecture). His grandfather was an ōzeki named Aramaki, who was well known in the neighborhood.
In the fall of 1846, he went to Osaka to join Minato stable, because the stablemaster (former yokozuna Shiranui Dakuemon) was also from Kumamoto and powerful within the Osaka Sumo Association. In 1847, he was given the shikona, or ring name, Shingari Minematsu (殿リ 峰松). and started his professional debut in Osaka sumo. His stablemaster realised his potential, and in 1849, he transferred to Sakaigawa stable in Edo-sumo, where he started using the shikona Shingari Minegorō (殿 峯五郎). Shiranui was then recruited to wrestle for the Hosokawa clan. He reached the top makuuchi division in November 1856. He was given the ring name Shiranui Kōemon (不知火 光右衛門), which was the combination of the name of his former master in Osaka and the name of a Kansei era ōzeki that the Hosokawa lord liked.

== Yokozuna ==
He was promoted to ōzeki in March 1862, but had to withdraw from the 1863 tournament due to an event called the 'Koyanagi murder' (the murder of maegashira Koyanagi). In October 1863, he was awarded a yokozuna licence by the Yoshida family. Shiranui became a yokozuna at the age of 38, even though his record as an ōzeki had not been particularly strong. The granting of the licence was more due to his popularity with the public and long years of service, and the fact that he was close to the Yoshida, which awarded the licences. His ring-entering performances were so spectacular that a nishiki-e woodblock print of him entering the ring was soon published and sold very well. After his promotion, he did not decline much, and left Edo in November 1869. He became a ringside promoter in Osaka, where he remained until July 1872. His record after his license was 63 wins, 16 losses, 5 holds, 2 draws, and 40 rests. In the top makuuchi division, Shiranui won 119 bouts and lost 35 bouts, recording a winning percentage of 77.3. After retiring from the ring completely, he founded his own stable (under the name Shiranui Dakuemon (不知火 諾右衛門)) and led the Osaka Sumo Association as its chairman. Shiranui died in 1879. His grave is located in Ōtsu, Kamimashiki District, Kumamoto.

== Yokozuna in-ring ceremony ==
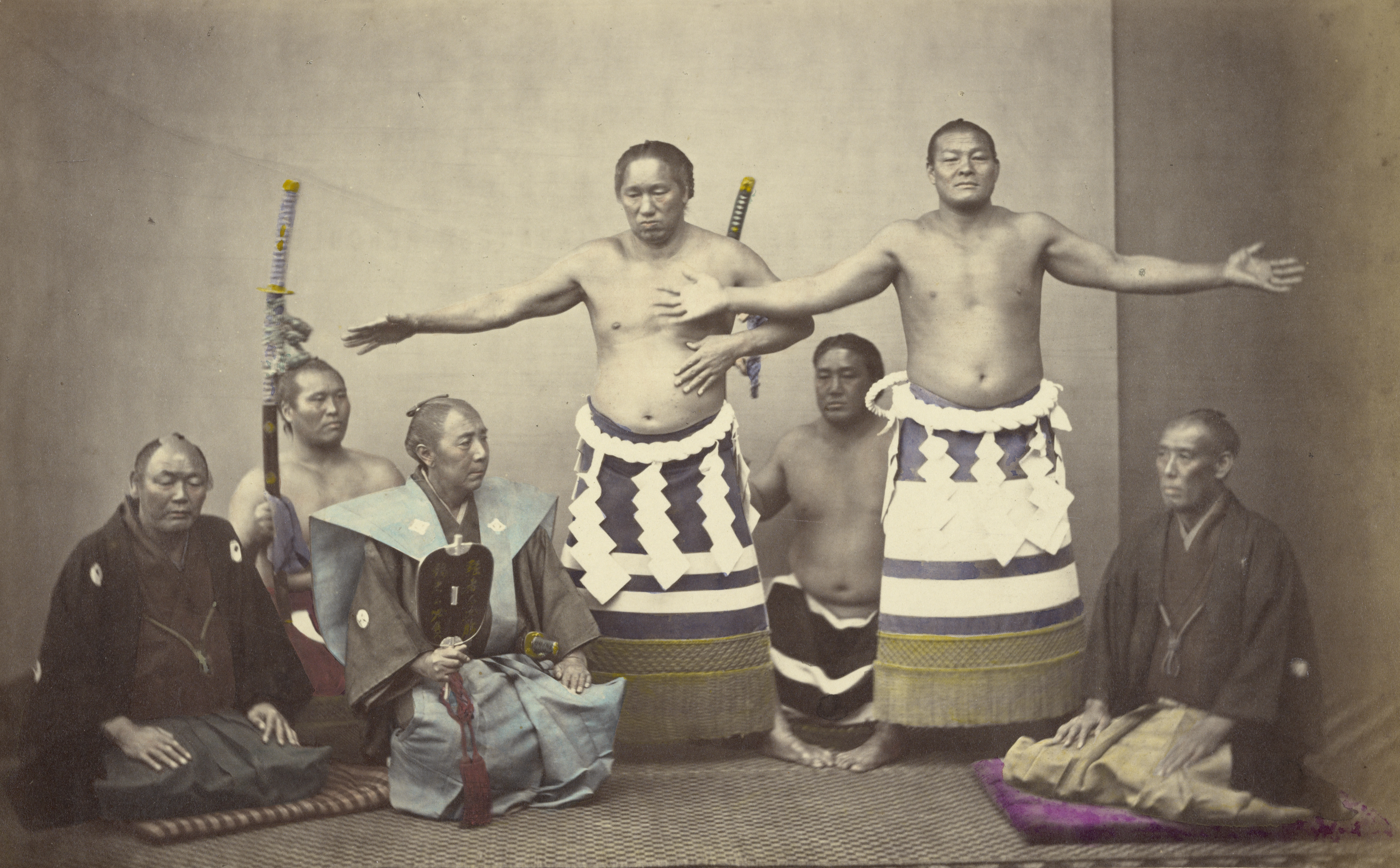
Shiranui (left) and Kimenzan (right) photographed by Felice Beato in 1869. Note Shiranui's left hand cupped to his chest, which indicates the Unryū ring-entering style, not the one that carries his namesake.

The name of one style of yokozuna dohyō-iri (the yokozuna ring-entering ceremony) came from him. His ritual style was said to be beautiful, and his ceremony was always a highlight for tournament crowds, sometimes more than the bouts themselves. He continued to perform it for three years after his retirement. However it is unproven that he actually performed what is now called the Shiranui style. In fact, he is considered by most sumo historians today to be the organizer of the Unryū style. There is a picture of him performing the ceremony holding his arm to his chest, which indicates an Unryū rather than Shiranui style. The 22nd Yokozuna Tachiyama, who was credited as perfecting the Shiranui style (with both arms held out), said his dohyō-iri was based on Unryū Kyūkichi's style. In addition, yokozuna Unryū Kyūkichi, who is said to have developed the Unryū style, is often represented on nishiki-e woodblock prints with his arms expanded, like the current Shiranui style.

== Fighting style ==
Although his performance was not particularly outstanding, he gradually rose in the ranks. Shiranui never won many major victories, but he rose steadily in the ranks and annoyed his opponents with his skill in the right-handed grip. He was more known for his technique than his strength, he was an expert at leg grabs, once downing Ryōgoku Kajinosuke I, himself an expert on the technique, with one clean move.

== Top division record ==
- The actual time the tournaments were held during the year in this period often varied.

Shiranui
-	Spring	Winter
1856	x	West Maegashira #7; 5–0–4; 1h
1857	West Maegashira #6; 2–2; 2d 2h	West Maegashira #4; 4–2–1; 1d 2h
1858	West Maegashira #3; 5–2–2; 1d	Called off due to fire
1859	West Sekiwake; 4–2–1; 2d 1h	West Komusubi; 6–1–2; 1d
1860	West Komusubi; 8–0–1; 1d Unofficial	West Sekiwake; 3–3–1
1861	West Sekiwake; 4–2–4	West Sekiwake; 6–1–2; 1h
1862	West Ōzeki; 4–1–4; 1d	West Ōzeki; 5–3–1; 1d
1863	West Ōzeki; 4–2–3; 1h	Sat out
1864	West Ōzeki; 7–1–2; Unofficial	West Ōzeki; 7–0–1; 1d 1h Unofficial
1865	West Ōzeki; 1–0–8; 1d	West Ōzeki; 6–1; 2d
1866	West Ōzeki; 6–2–2	East Ōzeki; 6–1–3
1867	East Ōzeki; 7–1–2	East Ōzeki; 2–2–5; 1d
1868	East Ōzeki; 6–1–3	East Ōzeki; 5–3–2
1869	East Ōzeki; 6–2–2	East Ōzeki; Retired; 0–0–10
Record given as win-loss-absent Top Division Champion Retired Lower Divisions Key: d=Draw(s) (引分); h=Hold(s) (預り); nr=no result recorded Divisions: Makuuchi — Jūryō — Makushita — Sandanme — Jonidan — Jonokuchi Makuuchi ranks: Yokozuna (not ranked as such on banzuke until 1890); Ōzeki — Sekiwake — Komusubi — Maegashira

*Championships for the best record in a tournament were not recognized or awarded before the 1909 summer tournament and the above unofficial championships are historically conferred. For more information see yūshō.

== See also ==
- List of yokozuna
- List of past sumo wrestlers
- Glossary of sumo terms

Preceded by Unryū Kyūkichi	11th Yokozuna; 1863–1869	Succeeded by Jinmaku Kyūgorō
Yokozuna is not a successive rank, and more than one wrestler can hold the title at once
