= Maruyama Gondazaemon =

Japanese sumo wrestler

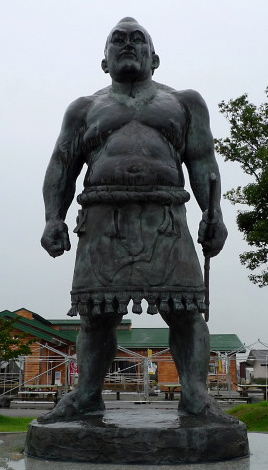
- Statue of Maruyama in Tome, Miyagi

Personal information
- Native name: 丸山 権太左衛門
- Born: 芳賀 銀太夫; Haga Gindayu; December 23, 1713 Mutsu Province, Japan
- Died: November 14, 1749 (aged 35)
- Height: 1.97 m (6 ft 6 in)
- Weight: 166 kg (366 lb)

Sport
- Sport: Sumo
- Heya: Nanatsumori stable
- Debut: c. Genbun
- Highest rank: Yokozuna (August 1749)
- Updated on September 2007

Maruyama Gondazaemon (Japanese: 丸山 権太左衛門; December 23, 1713 – November 14, 1749) was a Japanese sumo wrestler, who is formally recognised as the third yokozuna. His real name was Haga Gindayu (芳賀 銀太夫). He came from Mutsu Province in the Sendai Domain (part of what is now Miyagi Prefecture).

== Career ==
Maruyama went to Edo (now Tokyo) at the age of just 17, and was trained by Nanatsumori Oriemon (七ツ森折右衛門). His height was 197 cm and his weight was 166 kg. He left Edo to fight in Osaka sumo. In Osaka, he debuted at west ōzeki in 1737. It is said that he lost only two bouts in his career.

He is considered to have been a strong wrestler, but it has not been proven that he was awarded a yokozuna license. In honor of him, the house of Yoshida Tsukasa allowed him to be their disciple from August 1749, but this did not confer him the status of yokozuna. However, there are tales told that he wore a black-and-white rope. Though it was not a traditional shimenawa, Masahiko Nomi conjectured that it may have been related to the shimenawa.

Maruyama died in Nagasaki while an active sumo wrestler on November 14, 1749, possibly from dysentery. His grave lies in Nagasaki, Nagasaki Prefecture. A statue of him stands in Yoneyama, Tome, Miyagi.

It was not until over 150 years after his death that Maruyama was recognised as the third yokozuna by later yokozuna Jinmaku when he was compiling a formal list for a monument.

His life and career predate banzuke and tournament records, so no record of his rank and bouts exists.

== See also ==
- Glossary of sumo terms
- List of yokozuna
- List of past sumo wrestlers

Preceded by Ayagawa Gorōji	3rd Yokozuna	Succeeded by Tanikaze Kajinosuke
Yokozuna is not a successive rank, and more than one wrestler can hold the title at once
