= Inazuma Raigorō =

Japanese sumo wrestler

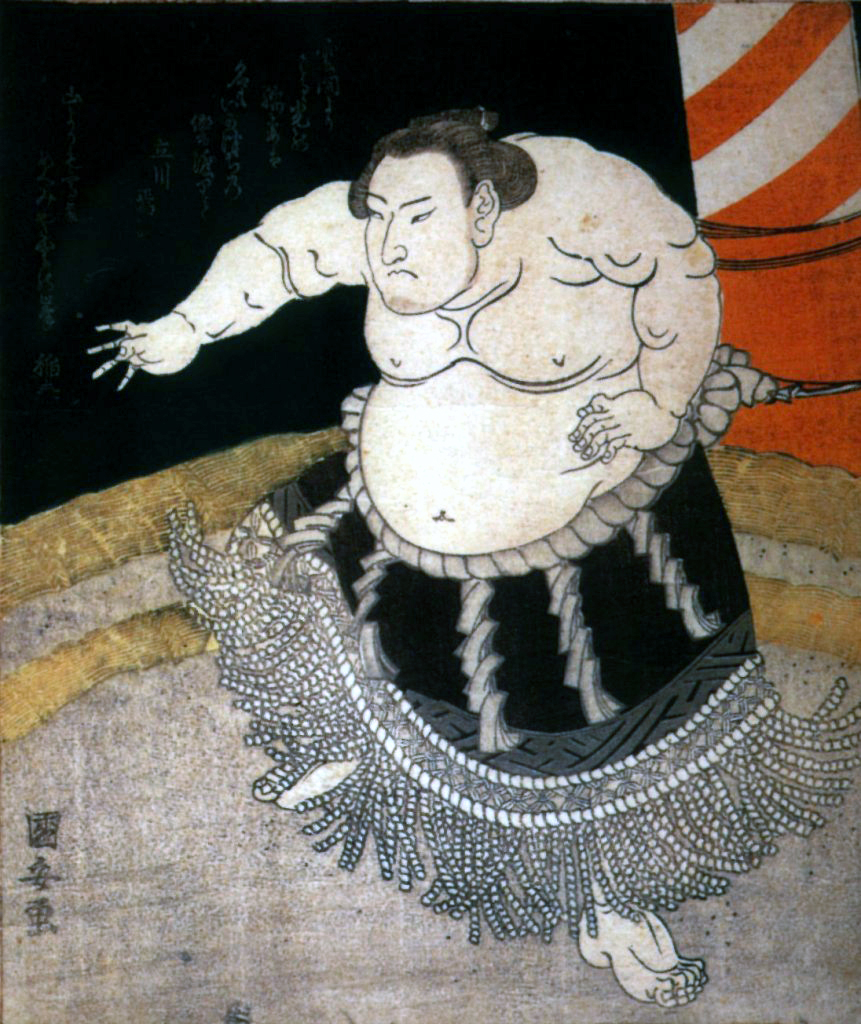
- 19th century print of Inazuma

Personal information
- Native name: 稲妻 雷五郎
- Born: Nemoto Saisuke; 1802 Awazaki, Hitachi Province, Japan
- Died: March 29, 1877 (aged 75) Tokyo Prefecture, Empire of Japan
- Height: 1.88 m (6 ft 2 in)
- Weight: 142 kg (313 lb)

Sport
- Sport: Sumo
- Retired: November 1839
- Heya: Sadogatake
- Record: 130-13-73; 14draws-3holds-1no result (Makuuchi)
- Debut: February 1821
- Highest rank: Yokozuna (September 1830)
- Championships: 10 (Makuuchi, unofficial)
- Updated on October 2007

Inazuma Raigorō (Japanese: 稲妻 雷五郎; 1802 – March 29, 1877) was a Japanese sumo wrestler from Awazaki, Hitachi Province (now Inashiki, Ibaraki Prefecture). He was the sport's 7th yokozuna.

== Early life and career ==
Born Nemoto Saisuke (根本 才助), his birth date is ambiguous. Although the date of 1802 is commonly accepted, some say he was born between 1795 or 1798. If the former is correct, he was the youngest yokozuna until the promotion of Umegatani Tōtarō II in 1903. The details of his younger days are unclear.
He entered the Sadogatake stable in 1821, under the shikona, or ring name, Makinoshima (巻ノ嶋). There, he began to wrestle for the Matsudaira clan, under which legendary sumo wrestler Raiden wrestled. Other sources state that he only started wrestling for the Matsudaira clan after he left his stable for the Nishikiyama stables. Upon promotion to komusubi in 1824, he changed his ring name to Inazuma Raigorō (稲妻 雷五郎), meaning "lightning bolt" in Japanese. He reached the highest rank of ōzeki on ability alone, after only 6 tournaments (some ōzeki of the period were merely given the rank because of their size or status). Ōnomatsu is said to have been his rival and their competition established the golden age of sumo in the late Edo period.
In 1828, the Gojō family offered him a yokozuna license and two years later he received one from the Yoshida family, and thus has been accepted as an official yokozuna.

In the top makuuchi division, he won 130 bouts and lost only 13 bouts, achieving a winning percentage of 90.9.

== Retirement from sumo ==
After his retirement, he moved to Matsue but he returned to Tokyo in the Meiji period. He was known as a good calligrapher and a skilled writer, leaving behind him a lot of haiku. He died on March 29, 1877. His last words were "Lightning (Inazuma (稲妻)) is passing away in the wind and the autumn sky". He was buried in the graveyard of the Myoen-ji temple in Shibuya, Tokyo. A bronze statue of Inazuma was erected in front of the Inashiki Municipal Museum of History and Folklore.

=== The sumo precepts ===
Inazuma is credited to have wrote the "Sumo Precepts" (sumo kun, 相撲訓), a combination of teachings related to sumo that warned rikishi against coarse behavior and taught them how to cultivate their fighting spirit. These precepts include notions like the cardinal values of Sumo (wisdom, humanity and courage) and disciplinary advices (wrestlers are not to indulge in the vices of alcohol and gambling). The "Sumo Precepts" also give advices to wrestlers when in bouts (do not show mercy to your opponent, do not underestimate him, do not fear him, do not scheme against him and follow your breathing while observing the moves).

== Top division record ==
- The actual time the tournaments were held during the year in this period often varied.

Inazuma
| - | Spring | Winter |
|---|---|---|
| 1824 | x | West Maegashira #5; 7–0–2; 1h Unofficial |
| 1825 | West Komusubi; 5–2–3 | West Komusubi; 8–1–1; Unofficial |
| 1826 | West Sekiwake; 6–1–2; 1d | West Sekiwake; 7–0–1; 1d 1h |
| 1827 | West Sekiwake; 5–0–2; Unofficial | Not enrolled |
| 1828 | Not enrolled | West Ōzeki; 4–1–5 |
| 1829 | West Ōzeki; 6–0–1; Unofficial | West Ōzeki; 8–0–1; 1d Unofficial |
| 1830 | West Ōzeki; 8–0–2; Unofficial | West Ōzeki; 6–1–2; 1h |
| 1831 | West Ōzeki; 3–1–6 | West Ōzeki; 8–0; Unofficial |
| 1832 | Not held | West Ōzeki; 8–0–1; 1d Unofficial |
| 1833 | West Ōzeki; 9–0; 1d Unofficial | Not enrolled |
| 1834 | Not enrolled | Not enrolled |
| 1835 | West Ōzeki; 5–0–3; 2d | West Ōzeki; 6–2–2 |
| 1836 | Sat out | West Ōzeki; 3–0–7 |
| 1837 | West Ōzeki; 5–0–4; 1d Unofficial | West Ōzeki; 5–1–1; 2d 1nr |
| 1838 | West Ōzeki; 3–0–3 | Sat out |
| 1839 | West Ōzeki; 1–3–5; 1d | West Ōzeki; Retired; 4–0–3; 3d |
Record given as win-loss-absent Top Division Champion Retired Lower Divisions Key: d=Draw(s) (引分); h=Hold(s) (預り); nr=no result recorded Divisions: Makuuchi — Jūryō — Makushita — Sandanme — Jonidan — Jonokuchi Makuuchi ranks: Yokozuna (not ranked as such on banzuke until 1890); Ōzeki — Sekiwake — Komusubi — Maegashira

*Championships for the best record in a tournament were not recognized or awarded before the 1909 summer tournament and the above unofficial championships are historically conferred. For more information see yūshō.

== See also ==
- Glossary of sumo terms
- List of past sumo wrestlers
- List of yokozuna

| Preceded by Ōnomatsu Midorinosuke | 7th Yokozuna; 1830–1839 | Succeeded by Shiranui Dakuemon |
Yokozuna is not a successive rank, and more than one wrestler can hold the title at once
