= Shiranui Dakuemon =

Japanese sumo wrestler

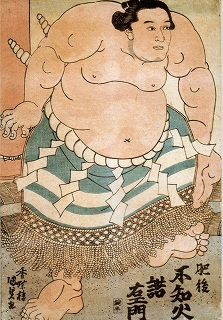
- 19th century woodblock print of Shiranui by Kunisada.

Personal information
- Native name: 不知火 諾右衛門
- Born: Chikahisa Shinji; October 1801 Uto, Higo, Japan
- Died: August 20, 1854 (aged 52)
- Height: 1.76 m (5 ft 9 in)
- Weight: 135 kg (298 lb)

Sport
- Sport: Sumo
- Retired: January 1844
- Heya: Urakaze
- Record: 48-15-65; 3draws-2holds-1no result (Makuuchi)
- Debut: November 1830
- Highest rank: Yokozuna (November 1840)
- Elder name: Minato
- Championships: 1 (Makuuchi, unofficial)
- Updated on October 2007

Shiranui Dakuemon (Japanese: 不知火 諾右衛門; October 1801 – August 20, 1854, name also read as Shiranui Nagiemon) was a Japanese sumo wrestler from Uto, Higo Province. He was the sport's 8th yokozuna, and is the only yokozuna in history to have been demoted.

== Early life ==
His real name was Chikahisa Shinji (近久 信次) and his father was a government official. After his father's death he took over his position at age 15. He married early, at the age of 19, and had two sons. In 1823, he got into an argument with the head of his village. Forgetting his own strength, he pushed the village head too harshly. The village head fell to the floor and was knocked unconscious. Knowing the trouble this would cause him, he escaped from his hometown, leaving his family. He found refuge in Sakai, Osaka Prefecture and became the pupil of a wrestler named Hatsuarashi Fumigoro (初嵐文五) who later bestowed his shikona, or ring name, to him. Another version makes him the apprentice of Minato Yuraemon (湊 由良右衛門).

== Professional sumo career ==
He entered Osaka-sumo and made his debut in May 1824 under the name Todatsuno Fujiyoshi (戸立野 藤吉) but changed his shikona multiple times. He didn't find much success in Osaka-sumo and transferred to Edo-sumo in November 1830 where he became the pupil of a wrestler named Urakaze Ichiemon (浦風 市右エ門) and wrestled for the Unshu domain (雲州藩). In March, 1839 he began to wrestle for the Kumamoto Domain in Higo and was promoted to ōzeki under the name Noginosato Nouemon (濃錦里 諾右衛門). He won only one tournament in February 1840 with an 8-0-2 record. He wasn't a particularly strong wrestler, but around the end of the Edo period the promotion in the ranking had less to do with ability and more to do with the influence of one's backers and Shiranui had powerful patrons. His promotion to ōzeki is also said to be because of the repeated failure of ōzeki (yokozuna) Inazuma to appear.

== Yokozuna promotion ==
While being an ōzeki, he was given a yokozuna license. The actual date he was awarded the title is obscure, but the date is officially recognized as being in November 1840. His name was not written on the banzuke for the next tournament in January 1841 and he was absent from the November 1841 tournament for unknown reasons. He was demoted to sekiwake in February 1842 and changed his shikona to Shiranui Dakuemon (不知火 諾右衛門). At that time, yokozuna was not a rank but a title. He is the only former yokozuna to be demoted from the ōzeki rank. In the top makuuchi division, Shiranui won 48 bouts and lost 15 bouts, recording a winning percentage of 76.2.

== Retirement from sumo ==
He retired from an active wrestler after the January 1844 tournament. He stayed in sumo as an elder after his retirement, under the name Minato (湊), and served as chairman of Osaka-sumo. The name of the Shiranui yokozuna dohyō-iri (ring entering ceremony) came not from him, but from the 11th yokozuna Shiranui Kōemon, whom he trained. Shiranui died in August, 1854 at 52. His grave is located on the hillside where he was born, in his hometown of Uto, Kumamoto. The place in considered a designated historic site and it's customary for Shiranui-style yokozuna to perform an in-ring ceremony when the Japan Sumo Association tours in the province.

== Top division record ==
- The actual time the tournaments were held during the year in this period often varied.

Shiranui
-	Spring	Winter
1837	West Maegashira #4; 3–0–7	West Maegashira #3; 5–1–3; 1nr
1838	West Maegashira #1; 2–1–3	West Maegashira #1; 7–1–2
1839	West Ōzeki; 2–4–4	West Sekiwake; 6–1–3
1840	West Ōzeki; 8–0–2; Unofficial	Sat out
1841	Not enrolled	Sat out
1842	West Sekiwake; 6–1–2; 1h	West Ōzeki; 4–1–5
1843	Sat out	West Ōzeki; 2–4–4
1844	West Ōzeki; Retired; 3–1–2; 3d 1h	x
Record given as win-loss-absent Top Division Champion Retired Lower Divisions Key: d=Draw(s) (引分); h=Hold(s) (預り); nr=no result recorded Divisions: Makuuchi — Jūryō — Makushita — Sandanme — Jonidan — Jonokuchi Makuuchi ranks: Yokozuna (not ranked as such on banzuke until 1890); Ōzeki — Sekiwake — Komusubi — Maegashira

*Championships for the best record in a tournament were not recognized or awarded before the 1909 summer tournament and the above unofficial championships are historically conferred. For more information see yūshō.

== See also ==
- Glossary of sumo terms
- List of yokozuna
- List of past sumo wrestlers

Preceded by Inazuma Raigorō	8th Yokozuna; 1840–1844	Succeeded by Hidenoyama Raigorō
Yokozuna is not a successive rank, and more than one wrestler can hold the title at once
