= Jinmaku Kyūgorō =

Japanese sumo wrestler

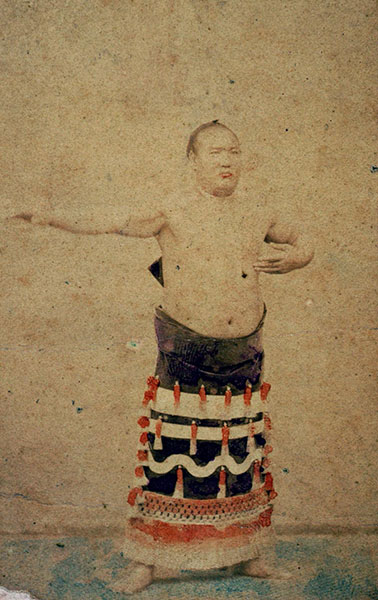

Personal information
- Native name: 陣幕 久五郎
- Born: Ishigura Shintarō; June 4, 1829 Itō, Izumo, Japan
- Died: October 21, 1903 (aged 74)
- Height: 1.74 m (5 ft 9 in)
- Weight: 138 kg (304 lb)

Sport
- Sport: Sumo
- Retired: November, 1867
- Heya: Hidenoyama
- Record: 87-5-65-17draws-3holds (Makuuchi)
- Debut: November, 1850
- Highest rank: Yokozuna (July, 1867)
- Championships: 5 (Makuuchi, unofficial)
- Updated on June 2013

Jinmaku Kyūgorō (陣幕 久五郎; June 4, 1829 – October 21, 1903) was a Japanese professional sumo wrestler from Itō, Izumo Province. He was the sport's 12th yokozuna and one of its most important record keepers and historians.

== Career ==
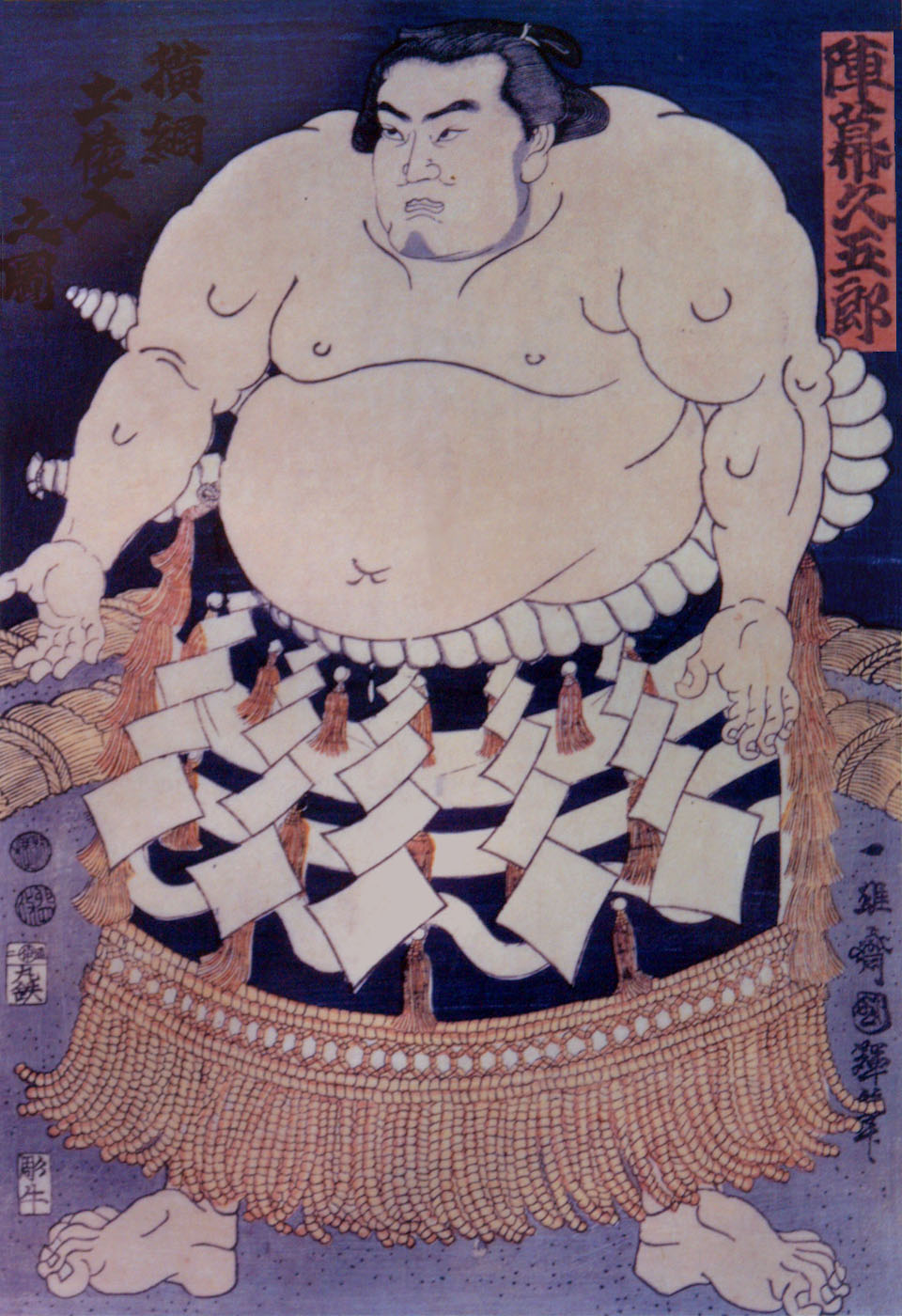
Woodblock print of Jinmaku

Jinmaku was born in Ou District, Izumo Province (modern Matsue, Shimane Prefecture). His real name was Ishigura Shintarō (石倉 槇太郎). In 1847, he became a pupil of a wrestler named Hatsushio Kyūgorō in Onomichi, Bingo Province (now in Hiroshima Prefecture). When Hatsushio died in 1848, he moved to Osaka and became a pupil of Asahiyama Shirouemon, fighting his first bout in 1850 and taking the shikona, or ring name, Kuroodoshi Makinosuke (黒縅 巻之助). In 1850 he was sent in excursion to Edo (now modern day Tokyo) and briefly became a pupil of Hidenoyama Raigorō, the 9th yokozuna. He worked under Tokushima Domain and took the shikona Jinmaku Kyūgorō (陣幕 久五郎). There he was known as one of the "Four Heavenly Kings of Awa" along with Kimenzan, Onaruto and Nijigatake, all of whom wrestled for the Tokushima. He then moved under the Matsue Domain and then Satsuma Domain to wrestle in Edo. His change of affiliation laid the groundwork for a rivalry between Jinmaku and the other Tokushima domain wrestlers, which resulted in several grudge matches.
He was absent from four consecutive tournaments from 1863 to 1865, and was expelled from one of these tournaments. He returned in November 1865 and became ōzeki in November 1866. He received a yokozuna licence by the Gojō family and not the Edo-based Yoshida family. He was awarded an official yokozuna licence in July 1867 but the November 1867 tournament became his last active tournament. It is said that he left Edo to inform Saigō Takamori in Kyoto of the burning of the Satsuma residence. In the context of the Boshin War he remained in Osaka to protect Shimazu Tadayoshi from harm. The banzuke, or ranking, was later revised and reprinted, and Jinmaku was given a haridashi rank and was also listed in the director's section. He also appeared in the Osaka-sumo Tournament of March 1890, only performing a ring-entering ceremony. He was yokozuna for only one tournament.
Jinmaku won 87 bouts and lost only 5 bouts in the top makuuchi division. All his defeats came when he was ranked as a maegashira and sekiwake. He is the only wrestler to have never lost a bout as a yokozuna. His winning percentage reached 94.6.

== Retirement from sumo and death ==
Because of his insight and political links, he was appointed Osaka-sumo supervisor by the Governor of Osaka Prefecture. With this momentum, Jinmaku worked hard to make Osaka-sumo independent and strengthened. On 6 June 1873, he organised a match at the tenran-zumō tournament at the Osaka Mint Palace, but Saigō Takamori was not satisfied with the organisation. He also supervised two Osaka-yokozuna promotions. He also managed a stable with Asahiyama (former komusubi Hiraishi, deceased 1877). However, Osaka-sumo has been in constant turmoil, with many deserters and with the death of his collaborator Asahiyama, the power of Jinmaku rapidly declined. His other collaborator, Shiranui, died and he finally retired in September 1890. In 1901, he was called to the completion ceremony of Yasukuni Shrine's haiden hall and performed a ring-entering ceremony. Jinmaku died in 1903.

== Yokozuna monument ==
Jinmaku was known as a 'monument fanatic' as he was particularly active in building monuments related to sumo all over the country and spent his fortune on building various monuments. In 1900, he erected the Yokozuna Rikishi Memorial Monument in the grounds of the Tomioka Hachiman Shrine in the Koto ward of Tokyo. It was the culmination of a lengthy personal project to properly acknowledge all his fellow yokozuna. For the first time, Akashi Shiganosuke, Ayagawa Gorōji and Maruyama Gondazaemon were recognised as the first three yokozuna.

== Top division record ==
- The actual time the tournaments were held during the year in this period often varied.

Jinmaku
-	Spring	Winter
1858	East Maegashira #6; 5–0–2; 3d	Called off due to fire
1859	East Maegashira #7; 3–0–6; 1d	East Maegashira #2; 6–2–1; 1h
1860	East Maegashira #2; 4–1–3; 2d	East Maegashira #2; 5–0; 2d
1861	East Maegashira #2; 9–0–1; Unofficial	East Maegashira #2; 5–0–4; 1d
1862	East Maegashira #2; 4–1–4; 1d	East Maegashira #2; 5–0–3; 2d
1863	East Sekiwake; 7–0–2; 1d	Sat out
1864	Not enrolled	Sat out
1865	Sat out	East Sekiwake; 6–0–1; 1d 1h Unofficial
1866	East Sekiwake; 6–1–2; 1h	West Ōzeki; 8–0–1; 1d Unofficial
1867	West Ōzeki; 7–0–1; 2d Unofficial	West Ōzeki; 7–0–3; Unofficial
1868	Retired –	x
Record given as win-loss-absent Top Division Champion Retired Lower Divisions Key: d=Draw(s) (引分); h=Hold(s) (預り); nr=no result recorded Divisions: Makuuchi — Jūryō — Makushita — Sandanme — Jonidan — Jonokuchi Makuuchi ranks: Yokozuna (not ranked as such on banzuke until 1890); Ōzeki — Sekiwake — Komusubi — Maegashira

*Championships for the best record in a tournament were not recognized or awarded before the 1909 summer tournament and the above unofficial championships are historically conferred. For more information see yūshō.

== See also ==
- Glossary of sumo terms
- List of past sumo wrestlers
- List of yokozuna

Preceded by Shiranui Kōemon	12th Yokozuna; 1867–1867	Succeeded by Kimenzan Tanigorō
Yokozuna is not a successive rank, and more than one wrestler can hold the title at once
