= Kitanowaka Daisuke =

Japanese sumo wrestler

Personal information
- Native name: 北の若 大輔
- Born: Daisuke Saitō; November 12, 2000 (age 26) Sakata, Yamagata Prefecture, Japan
- Height: 1.91 m (6 ft 3 in)
- Weight: 159 kg (351 lb; 25.0 st)

Sport
- Sport: Sumo
- Rank: see below
- Heya: Hakkaku
- Debut: March 2019
- Highest rank: Maegashira 14 (March 2024)
- Championships: 1 (Jūryō)
- Updated on September 27, 2026

Kitanowaka Daisuke (Japanese: 北の若 大輔; born 12 November 2000 as Daisuke Saitō (齋藤 大輔, Saitō Daisuke)) is a Japanese professional sumo wrestler from Sakata, Yamagata Prefecture.

== Early life and sumo background ==
Daisuke started sumo in a club in third grade at Miyanoura Elementary School. There, he won the Iwate prefectural tournament without any previous experience of sport. When he was still in primary school, his sumo club was invited to Hakkaku stable to be housed and trained there during a national wanpaku sumo tournament. Daisuke remembers having an excellent impression of the Hakkaku wrestlers, particularly Ōiwato, a wrestler who also comes from Yamagata.

He then continued to do sumo in junior high school and senior high school, leaving his native prefecture to join Saitama Sakae High School, a school with a renowned sumo club. There, he won his first national championship during his junior high school years and won five individual titles in total. In his third year of senior high school, he came out first at the heavyweight category during the World Junior Championship; and won both the team and individual championships at the National High School Tournament, hence becoming the 2018 high-school yokozuna.

He considered to pursue an amateur career at the university level but decided instead to turn pro in February 2019. He attributed this decision to a meeting he had with former yokozuna Kitanofuji in the yokozuna sister's chankonabe restaurant in Sakata, Yamagata. He has been a Kitanofuji fan ever since he watched yokozuna Kashiwado's (who is from his prefecture) matches against him as a child. Because of his prior connections with Hakkaku stable and the fact that Kitanofuji was the master of Hakkaku-oyakata (former yokozuna Hokutoumi), Daisuke logically joined Hakkaku stable. Thanks to Kitanofuji's role in this recruitment, Kitanowaka is sometimes nicknamed Kitanofuji's treasured son (北の富士さんの秘蔵っ子).

Kitanowaka (北の若)'s shikona, or ring name, was given to him at the behest of Kitanofuji (北の富士), who wanted the young wrestler to inherit the 'Kitano' (北の) kanji from his own name.

== Early career ==
Kitanowaka began his professional career in May 2019, and scored a kachi-koshi record of 6–1 in his first tournament, after suffering an upset defeat in his fourth match. Kitanowaka spent the rest of his first professional year steadily climbing the rankings, reaching the sandanme division for the November tournament. There, he competed for the championship but was defeated on the final day by Naruto stable's Motobayashi. His score of 6–1, however, allowed Kitanowaka to join the makushita division for the first tournament of 2020, where he wrestled throughout the year. In 2021, Kitanowaka once again found himself in a position to potentially win a championship when he recorded 6 consecutive victories in the September 2021 makushita tournament. However, he was defeated again in his final match, losing the championship to Takasago stable's Fukai. Between 2020 and 2021, Kitanowaka came up against the makushita wall, climbing up the rankings thanks to some good results but without registering any championship wins. On two occasions he even suffered make-koshi negative scores, delaying his promotion to the jūryō division. Nevertheless, promoted to the top of his division, during the last tournament of the year he managed to secure promotion to sekitori status by securing promotion to the jūryō division by defeating upper division wrestler Kyokushūhō. At the time, Kitanowaka was promoted along Shiden and Kotoyūshō. He became the first sekitori raised in Hakkaku stable in five and a half years, and the first since Hokutofuji.

During his first jūryō tournament, Kitanowaka, despite a barely achieved positive record, received the compliments of Kitanofuji who praised his progress since his years in makushita. Securing promotion in this division, he was promoted to jūryō 5 for the May 2022 tournament after a good performance in March. Nevertheless, he was injured during that tournament and had to declare himself kyūjō (absent) for the sixth day of the tournament citing a right thigh flexor tendon injury, and allowing Ryūden to win by default. Kitanowaka nevertheless returned on Day 12 to avoid demotion to the makushita division, and won two of his four matches to stay in the jūryō division.

In January 2023, Kitanowaka, then defeated by Asanoyama, received harsh comments from Kitanofuji, who felt that Kitanowaka had shown no resistance and had not been training hard enough since the retirement of his senior stablemate Okinoumi. Promoted to his highest rank in September 2023, it was noted that Kitanowaka was in a position for imminent promotion to sumo's top division, makuuchi. As his master Hakkaku neared the mandatory retirement age of 65, it was also noted that his promotion would allow former Hokutoumi to leave having solidified the legacy of his stable. On the twelfth day of the September tournament of the same year, Kitanowaka inflicted defeat on Ōnosato, hampering the latter's progress in the race for the jūryō title and declaring after the match "I was looking forward to this", both opponents having been yokozuna in their respective amateur careers. On the fourteenth day of the tournament, Kitanowaka also inflicted a defeat on the tournament's second leader, Ichiyamamoto, recording an eighth victory and boosting his own chances of promotion to the makuuchi division.

== Makuuchi promotion ==
When the banzuke for the November 2023 tournament was released, it was confirmed that Kitanowaka would indeed be promoted to sumo's highest division. This promotion makes Kitanowaka the eighth wrestler from Yamagata Prefecture to reach the rank of maegashira and the first since Ōiwato in March 2013.

On the first day of the competition, Kitanowaka distinguished himself by winning his first makuuchi victory on his birthday and by performing his first makuuchi ring-entering ceremony using a keshō-mawashi designed with Koitarō Samejima, the main character of the sumo manga Bachi Bachi, created by the late Takahiro Satō, an artist from the same hometown. After a poor performance, Kitanowaka was relegated to the jūryō division and failed to maintain a standard that would allow him to assert himself later in the year in the makuuchi division. In addition, he was injured during the May 2024 tournament, having to declare himself kyūjō.

On Day 8 of the January 2025 tournament, Kitanowaka lost his match against Takerufuji after getting his right foot trapped on the straw bales while retreating from an attack. Kitanowaka was removed from the dohyō in a wheelchair and was subsequently diagnosed with a broken ankle, forcing his withdrawal from the tournament and complete absence from the next, ultimately leading to a demotion to makushita.

Kitanowaka returned to the sekitori ranks for the November 2025 tournament. At the September 2026 tournament, he put in a strong performance, qualifying for the jūryō championship through a three-wrestler playoff. Kitanowaka defeated Kagayaki and then Kayō to win the championship.

== Fighting style ==
Kitanowaka's most common kimarite (winning-technique), is yori-kiri, force out victory, preferring a migi-yotsu, (left hand outside, right hand inside grip) on his opponent's mawashi. He also regularly wins by oshi-dashi, push out victory, and uwatenage, overarm throw. When he joined Hakkaku stable, his master, former yokozuna Hokutoumi, tried to teach him an always forward style, based on pushing-style techniques.

== Career record ==
Kitanowaka Daisuke
Year	January Hatsu basho, Tokyo	March Haru basho, Osaka	May Natsu basho, Tokyo	July Nagoya basho, Nagoya	September Aki basho, Tokyo	November Kyūshū basho, Fukuoka
2019	x	(Maezumō)	East Jonokuchi #16; 6–1	West Jonidan #46; 5–2	East Jonidan #7; 6–1	East Sandanme #46; 6–1
2020	East Makushita #57; 5–2	East Makushita #34; 5–2	West Makushita #20; Tournament Cancelled; State of Emergency; 0–0–0	West Makushita #20; 4–3	West Makushita #14; 4–3	West Makushita #9; 3–4
2021	East Makushita #11; 4–3	East Makushita #8; 3–4	East Makushita #14; 3–4	East Makushita #21; 5–2	East Makushita #11; 6–1	East Makushita #3; 5–2
2022	West Jūryō #12; 8–7	East Jūryō #10; 11–4	East Jūryō #5; 3–7–5	East Jūryō #12; 8–7	West Jūryō #11; 10–5	West Jūryō #6; 6–9
2023	West Jūryō #8; 5–10	West Jūryō #11; 8–7	West Jūryō #10; 8–7	West Jūryō #5; 10–5	East Jūryō #2; 8–7	East Maegashira #17; 5–10
2024	West Jūryō #3; 10–5	West Maegashira #14; 3–12	West Jūryō #5; 8–5–2	East Jūryō #3; 8–7	West Maegashira #16; 6–9	East Jūryō #1; 9–6
2025	West Maegashira #15; 4–5–6	West Jūryō #2; Sat out due to injury 0–0–15	East Makushita #1; 3–4	West Makushita #3; 4–3	West Makushita #1; 5–2	East Jūryō #12; 8–7
2026	West Jūryō #8; 7–8	West Jūryō #8; 9–6	West Jūryō #5; 8–7	East Jūryō #5; 7–8	East Jūryō #6; 11–4–PP; Champion	West Maegashira #15; 9–6
Record given as wins–losses–absences Top division champion Top division runner-up Retired Non-participation Jūryō Lower divisions Sanshō key: F=Fighting spirit; O=Outstanding performance; T=Technique Also shown: ★=Kinboshi; P=Playoff(s); Divisions: Makuuchi — Jūryō — Makushita — Sandanme — Jonidan — Jonokuchi Makuuchi ranks: Yokozuna — Ōzeki — Sekiwake — Komusubi — Maegashira

== See also ==
- Glossary of sumo terms
- List of active sumo wrestlers
- List of sumo second division champions
