= Kitaseumi Hiromitsu =

Japanese sumo wrestler (1948–2026)

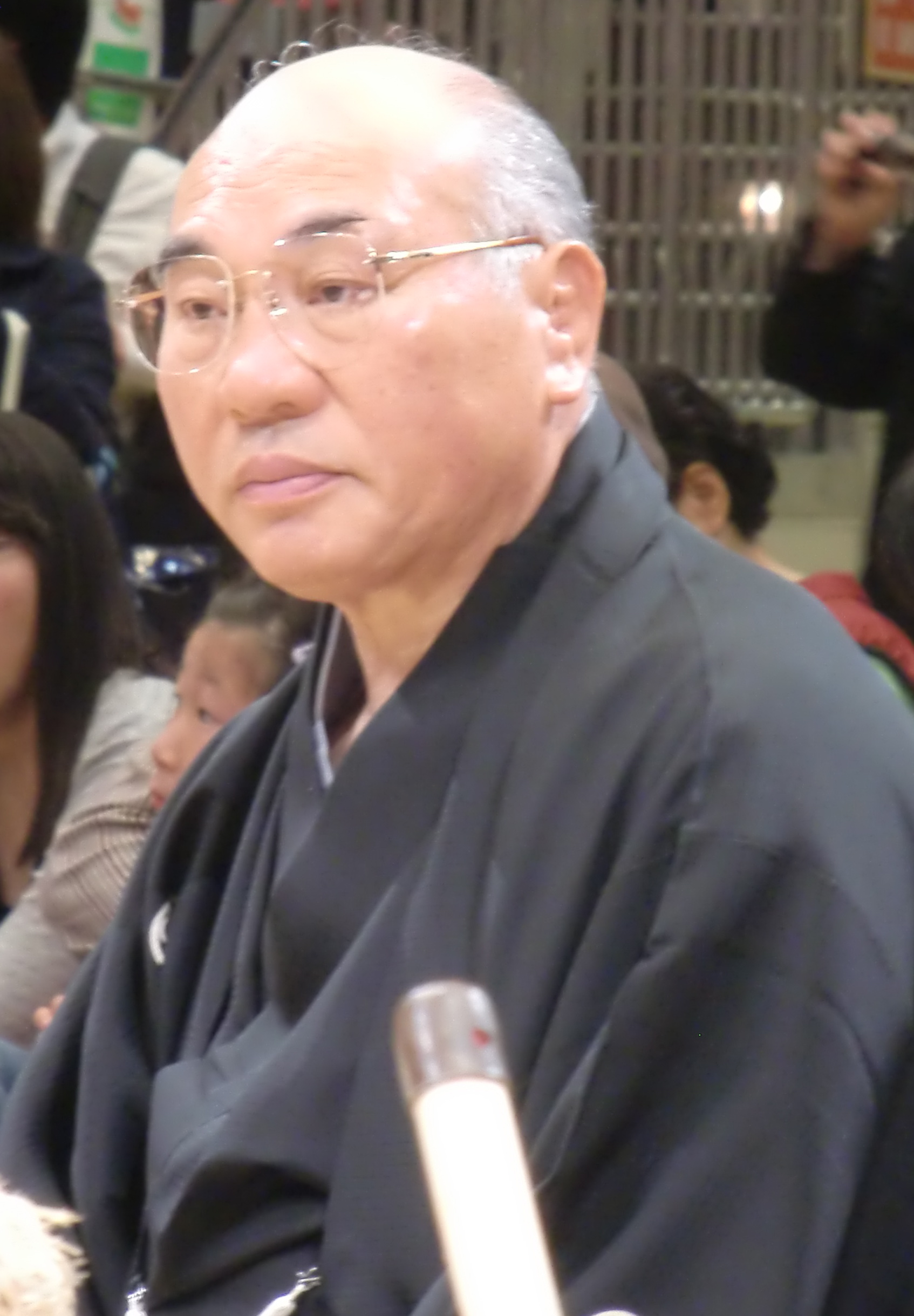

Personal information
- Native name: 北瀬海 弘光
- Born: Takashi Tsuchiya; July 2, 1948 Kitahiyama, Hokkaidō, Allied-occupied Japan
- Died: July 26, 2026 (aged 78) Tokyo, Japan
- Height: 1.75 m (5 ft 9 in)
- Weight: 109 kg (240 lb)

Sport
- Sport: Sumo
- Retired: May 1979
- Heya: Dewanoumi → Kokonoe
- Record: 536-526-6
- Debut: July 1964
- Highest rank: Sekiwake (July 1976)
- Elder name: Kimigahama
- Championships: 1 (Jūryō); 1 (Makushita)
- Special Prizes: Outstanding Performance (2); Technique (1)
- Gold Stars: 1 (Wajima)
- Updated on June 2020

Kitaseumi Hiromitsu (Japanese: 北瀬海 弘光; July 2, 1948 – July 26, 2026), born Takashi Tsuchiya (土谷 孝), was a Japanese sumo wrestler from Kitahiyama, Hokkaidō. He made his professional debut in July 1964, and reached the top division in March 1972. His highest rank was sekiwake. He retired in May 1979 and was an active elder in the Japan Sumo Association under the name "Kimigahama".

As Kimigahama he first coached at Kokonoe stable, but in 1993, moved to Hakkaku stable when it was started up by former Kokonoe wrestler Hokutoumi (the 61st Yokozuna). He reached the Sumo Association's mandatory retirement age of 65 in July 2013. The Kimigahama toshiyori-kabu (or elder name) was acquired by Hakkaku wrestler Okinoumi in October 2013.

Hiromitsu died at a hospital in Tokyo, on July 26, 2026, at the age of 78.

== Career record ==
Kitaseumi Hiromitsu
Year	January Hatsu basho, Tokyo	March Haru basho, Osaka	May Natsu basho, Tokyo	July Nagoya basho, Nagoya	September Aki basho, Tokyo	November Kyūshū basho, Fukuoka
1964	x	x	x	(Maezumo)	East Jonokuchi #19; 6–1	East Jonidan #82; 5–2
1965	East Jonidan #32; 3–4	West Jonidan #48; 4–3	East Jonidan #20; 4–3	West Sandanme #83; 3–4	West Sandanme #93; 2–5	East Jonidan #12; 6–1
1966	East Sandanme #63; 3–4	East Sandanme #67; 4–3	West Sandanme #54; 2–5	East Sandanme #75; 4–3	West Sandanme #50; 4–3	West Sandanme #19; 6–1
1967	West Makushita #83; 4–3	West Makushita #69; 4–3	West Sandanme #9; 2–5	East Sandanme #28; 5–2	East Sandanme #4; 3–4	East Sandanme #12; 5–2
1968	West Makushita #49; 4–3	West Makushita #38; 5–2	West Makushita #26; 4–3	East Makushita #21; 4–3	West Makushita #17; 3–4	West Makushita #23; 5–2
1969	East Makushita #13; 5–2	West Makushita #5; 4–3	East Makushita #3; 3–4	West Makushita #6; 7–0; Champion	West Jūryō #9; 7–8	East Jūryō #11; 6–9
1970	East Makushita #2; 4–3	East Makushita #1; 3–4	West Makushita #3; 5–2	East Jūryō #13; 10–5	West Jūryō #5; 6–9	East Jūryō #10; 8–7
1971	East Jūryō #8; 8–7	East Jūryō #7; 7–8	East Jūryō #8; 6–9	West Jūryō #12; 8–7	East Jūryō #11; 8–7	East Jūryō #8; 11–4; Champion
1972	West Jūryō #1; 8–7	East Maegashira #13; 10–5	East Maegashira #2; 4–11	West Maegashira #8; 8–7	West Maegashira #5; 5–10	East Maegashira #10; 8–7
1973	East Maegashira #7; 9–6	East Maegashira #2; 5–10	West Maegashira #9; 8–7	West Maegashira #6; 6–9	West Maegashira #10; 9–6	East Maegashira #6; 8–7
1974	West Maegashira #3; 8–7	East Maegashira #1; 4–11	West Maegashira #10; 8–7	East Maegashira #8; 3–12	West Jūryō #1; 9–6	East Maegashira #13; 8–7
1975	West Maegashira #9; 9–6	West Maegashira #3; 3–12	West Maegashira #10; 7–8	East Maegashira #11; 8–7	West Maegashira #6; 6–9	East Maegashira #9; 6–9
1976	West Maegashira #12; 8–7	West Maegashira #11; 12–3; O★	West Komusubi #1; 10–5; O	East Sekiwake #1; 3–12	West Maegashira #6; 8–7	West Maegashira #2; 4–11
1977	West Maegashira #9; 10–5	East Maegashira #1; 9–6; T	West Sekiwake #1; 3–6–6	West Maegashira #4; 5–10	East Maegashira #10; 8–7	West Maegashira #8; 6–9
1978	West Maegashira #11; 10–5	East Maegashira #5; 6–9	West Maegashira #9; 5–10	West Jūryō #2; 9–6	East Jūryō #1; 7–8	West Jūryō #4; 8–7
1979	West Jūryō #2; 9–6	East Maegashira #13; 8–7	West Maegashira #8; Retired; 1–11	x	x	x
Record given as wins–losses–absences Top division champion Top division runner-up Retired Lower divisions Non-participation Sanshō key: F=Fighting spirit; O=Outstanding performance; T=Technique Also shown: ★=Kinboshi; P=Playoff(s); Divisions: Makuuchi — Jūryō — Makushita — Sandanme — Jonidan — Jonokuchi Makuuchi ranks: Yokozuna — Ōzeki — Sekiwake — Komusubi — Maegashira

== See also ==
- Glossary of sumo terms
- List of past sumo wrestlers
- List of sumo tournament second division champions
- List of sekiwake
