= Fujinoshin Tsukasa =

Japanese sumo wrestler

Personal information
- Native name: 富士乃真 司
- Born: Tetsuya Yagi; 6 November 1960 (age 65) Funabashi, Chiba, Japan
- Height: 1.80 m (5 ft 11 in)
- Weight: 131 kg (289 lb)

Sport
- Sport: Sumo
- Retired: September, 1990
- Heya: Izutsu → Kokonoe
- Record: 408-386-47
- Debut: March, 1976
- Highest rank: Maegashira 1 (January, 1988)
- Elder name: Jinmaku
- Updated on Sep. 2012

Fujinoshin Tsukasa (born 6 November 1960 as Tetsuya Yagi) is a former sumo wrestler from Funabashi, Chiba, Japan. He made his professional debut in March 1976, and reached the top division in September 1986. His highest rank was maegashira 1. He retired in September 1990 after suffering multiple injuries and became an elder in the Japan Sumo Association.

== Career ==
He was born in Funabashi, Chiba, not far from the Kuramae Kokugikan. At the age of 15 in March 1976 he joined Izutsu stable (later renamed Kokonoe stable), recruited by former yokozuna Kitanofuji. He switched from his family name of Yagi to the ring name of Fujihikari in 1978. After several years in the lower divisions he broke into jūryō division in January 1985, but only stayed there for two tournaments. He returned to jūryō in January 1986 and made the top makuuchi division in September of that year, before falling back to jūryō. In November 1987 he returned to the top division and stayed there for two years, reaching a highest rank of maegashira 1 in January 1988, although he was unable to defeat a yokozuna or win a special prize. During this period he was part of a stable that included two yokozuna, Chiyonofuji and Hokutoumi, as well as fellow maegashira Takanofuji.

The beginning of the end of Fujinoshin′s career came on Day 12 of the Aki basho in September 1989 when he had his ankle broken by a wrestler (Misugisato) who fell on it while Fujinoshin was sitting by the dohyō waiting for his match. He was unable to compete and had to default and withdraw from the tournament. The kosho or public injury system which protected a wrestler′s rank for one tournament did not apply in his case as the injury did not occur in a tournament bout itself, and as a result he fell back to the jūryō division. He returned to sumo in January 1990 but was unable to win promotion back to makuuchi and announced his retirement in September 1990 having fallen into the makushita division after another enforced absence.

== Retirement from sumo ==
Fujinoshin has remained in the sumo world as a toshiyori or elder of the Japan Sumo Association and has worked as a coach at Kokonoe stable and Hakkaku stable. Until 1998 he was known as Nishikido Oyakata, but when his old boss Kitanofuji quit the Sumo Association that year he switched to the Jinmaku elder name.

== Fighting style ==
Fujinoshin employed a wide variety of techniques but was regarded by some commentators as a jack of all trades, master of none. He favoured a right hand outside, left hand inside grip (hidari-yotsu) on his opponent's mawashi or belt. His most common winning technique was yori-kiri (force out) but he also tried oshi–dashi (push out), hataki–komi (slap down), yori–taoshi (force out and down), uwate–nage (overarm throw), shitate–nage (underarm throw), uwatedashi–nage (pulling overarm throw) and katasukashi (armlock throw).

== Career record ==
Fujinoshin Tsukasa
Year	January Hatsu basho, Tokyo	March Haru basho, Osaka	May Natsu basho, Tokyo	July Nagoya basho, Nagoya	September Aki basho, Tokyo	November Kyūshū basho, Fukuoka
1976	x	(Maezumo)	East Jonokuchi #21; 5–2	East Jonidan #77; 4–3	East Jonidan #57; 2–5	West Jonidan #84; 5–2
1977	East Jonidan #35; 3–4	East Jonidan #44; 4–3	East Jonidan #19; 5–2	West Sandanme #67; 3–4	East Sandanme #82; 4–3	East Sandanme #64; 3–4
1978	East Sandanme #79; 3–4	East Sandanme #87; 3–4	East Jonidan #11; 2–3–2	East Jonidan #35; 5–2	East Sandanme #90; 6–1	East Sandanme #38; 4–3
1979	West Sandanme #26; 2–5	East Sandanme #49; 2–5	East Sandanme #74; 6–1	West Sandanme #24; 1–6	East Sandanme #56; 4–3	West Sandanme #41; 2–5
1980	West Sandanme #64; 2–5	East Sandanme #90; 6–1	East Sandanme #42; 3–4	West Sandanme #54; 6–1	East Sandanme #9; 4–3	East Makushita #56; 3–4
1981	West Sandanme #11; 5–2	West Makushita #50; 5–2	West Makushita #28; 3–4	East Makushita #35; 5–2	East Makushita #22; 4–3	West Makushita #15; 3–4
1982	East Makushita #23; 2–5	East Makushita #40; 4–3	East Makushita #30; 3–4	East Makushita #45; Sat out due to injury 0–0–7	West Sandanme #20; 4–3	East Sandanme #7; 3–4
1983	West Sandanme #23; 4–3	East Sandanme #9; 3–4	West Sandanme #27; 4–1–2	East Sandanme #16; Sat out due to injury 0–0–7	East Sandanme #16; 4–3	East Sandanme #7; 6–1
1984	East Makushita #36; 5–2	West Makushita #21; 3–4	East Makushita #31; 5–2	East Makushita #17; 6–1	East Makushita #6; 5–2	West Makushita #1; 5–2
1985	West Jūryō #11; 7–8	West Jūryō #12; 3–12	West Makushita #10; 3–4	West Makushita #15; 4–3	East Makushita #10; 5–2	West Makushita #4; 6–1
1986	West Jūryō #10; 8–7	West Jūryō #6; 8–7	East Jūryō #4; 8–7	East Jūryō #3; 10–5	West Maegashira #13; 6–9	East Jūryō #5; 6–9
1987	East Jūryō #9; 9–6	West Jūryō #5; 9–6	West Jūryō #2; 8–7	West Jūryō #1; 9–6	West Maegashira #13; 9–6	West Maegashira #6; 8–7
1988	East Maegashira #1; 5–10	West Maegashira #4; 5–6–4	West Maegashira #9; 7–8	East Maegashira #11; 8–7	West Maegashira #6; 5–10	West Maegashira #10; 9–6
1989	East Maegashira #4; 6–9	West Maegashira #7; 5–10	East Maegashira #11; 9–6	East Maegashira #6; 8–7	West Maegashira #3; 3–10–2	East Maegashira #14; Sat out due to injury 0–0–15
1990	East Jūryō #10; 8–7	East Jūryō #7; 5–10	West Jūryō #13; 4–11	West Makushita #9; Sat out due to injury 0–0–7	East Makushita #49; Retired; 2–4–1	x
Record given as wins–losses–absences Top division champion Top division runner-up Retired Lower divisions Non-participation Sanshō key: F=Fighting spirit; O=Outstanding performance; T=Technique Also shown: ★=Kinboshi; P=Playoff(s); Divisions: Makuuchi — Jūryō — Makushita — Sandanme — Jonidan — Jonokuchi Makuuchi ranks: Yokozuna — Ōzeki — Sekiwake — Komusubi — Maegashira

== See also ==
- Glossary of sumo terms
- List of past sumo wrestlers
- List of sumo elders
