= Hokutofuji Daiki =

Japanese sumo wrestler (born 1992)

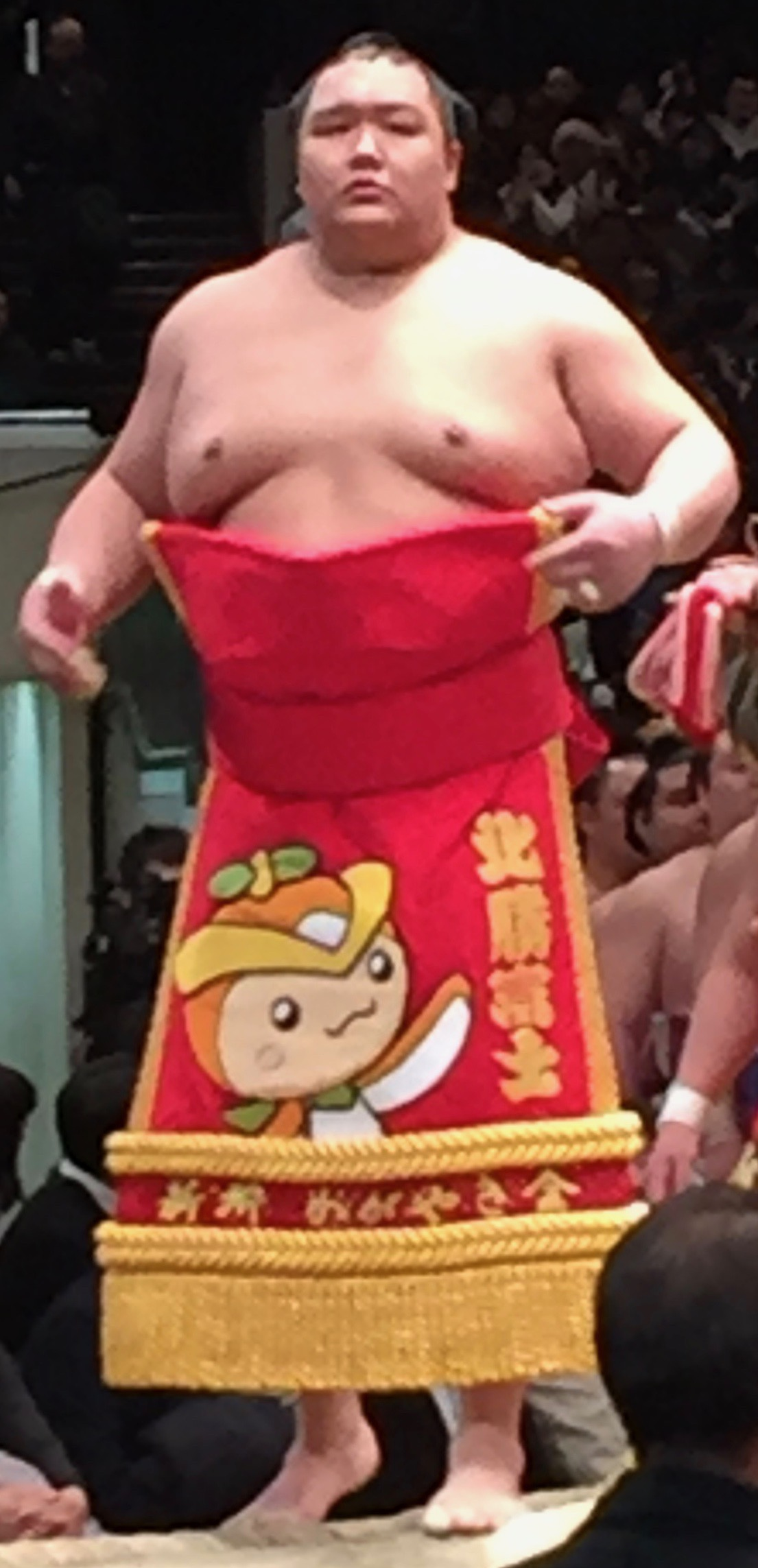
- Hokutofuji in 2017

Personal information
- Native name: 北勝富士 大輝
- Born: Daiki Nakamura; 15 July 1992 (age 34) Tokorozawa, Saitama
- Height: 1.84 m (6 ft 0 in)
- Weight: 159 kg (351 lb; 25.0 st)

Sport
- Sport: Sumo
- University team: Nippon Sport Science University
- Retired: 15 May 2025
- Heya: Hakkaku
- Record: 424-368-39
- Debut: March 2015
- Highest rank: Komusubi (March 2019)
- Elder name: Ōyama
- Championships: 1 (Jūryō); 1 (Sandanme); 1 (Jonidan)
- Special Prizes: Technique (2); Fighting Spirit (1)
- Gold Stars: 7 Kakuryū (2); Harumafuji; Kisenosato (2); Hakuhō (2)
- Updated on 15 May 2025

Hokutofuji Daiki (Japanese: 北勝富士 大輝; born 15 July 1992 as Daiki Nakamura (中村 大輝, Nakamura Daiki)) is a Japanese former professional sumo wrestler from Tokorozawa, Saitama. His debut in maezumō was in March 2015, and his first makuuchi division honbasho was the Kyūshū tournament in November 2016. His highest rank has been komusubi. He has seven kinboshi or gold stars for a defeat of a yokozuna and two special prizes for Technique and one for Fighting spirit. He wrestled for Hakkaku stable.

== Career ==
=== Early career ===
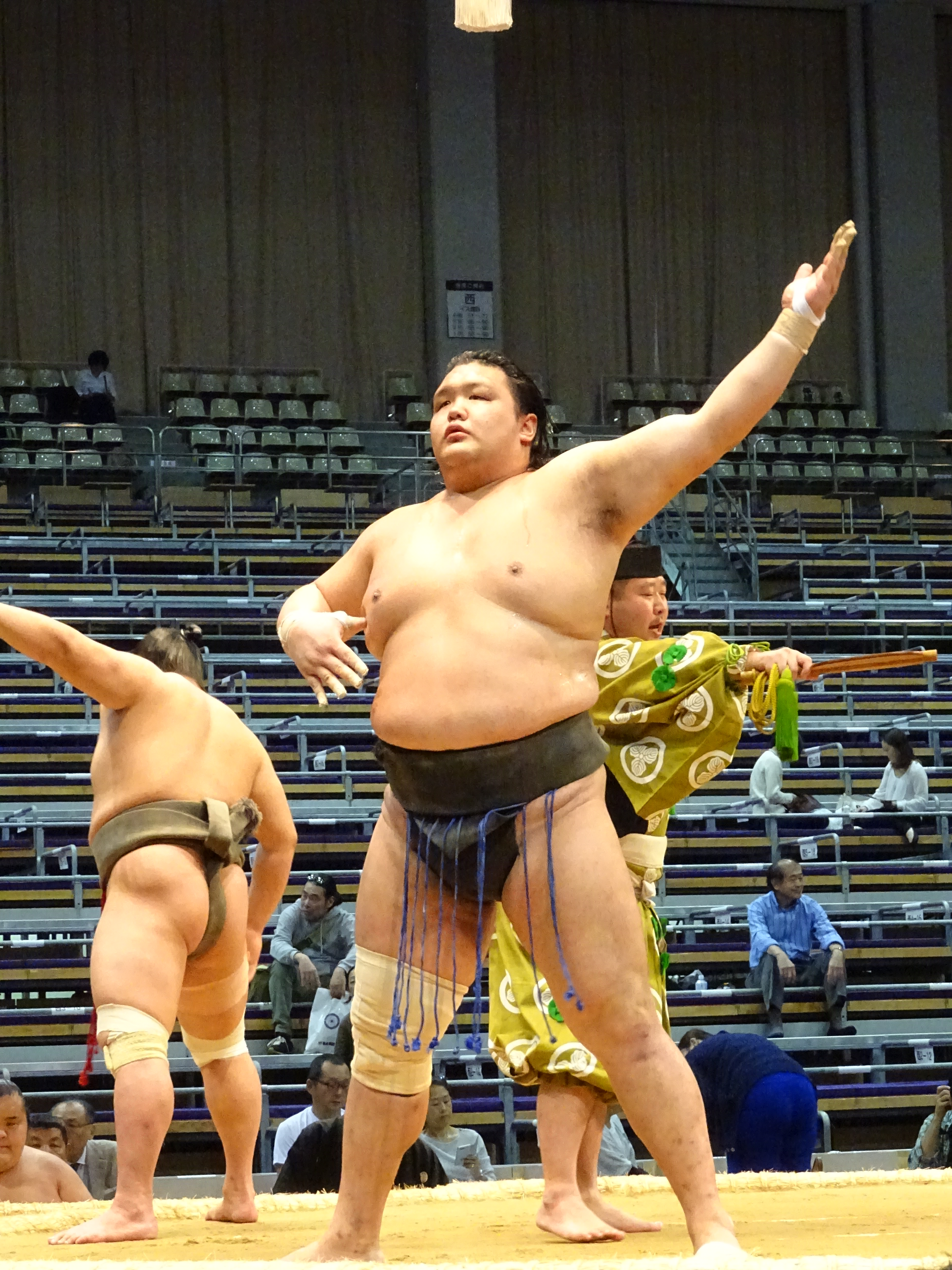
Still under the name Daiki in November 2015, his first tournament in the makushita division

Hokutofuji was a high school yokozuna at Saitama Sakae High School (also the alma mater of Gōeidō) and won multiple major amateur champions before his senior year at Nippon Sport Science University. If he had entered professional sumo in either of those years he would have started as a makushita tsukedashi and skipped the lower divisions, but his parents wanted him to complete his education. So instead he made his debut in March 2015 at the maezumō level. He was unable to compete under his family name of Nakamura as that was already taken by Nakamura Oyakata (former sekiwake Kotonishiki), so instead he used his given name, Daiki. He rose up the ranks quickly, winning the yūshō or tournament championships in the jonidan and sandanme divisions with perfect 7-0 records. He became a sekitori upon reaching the jūryō division in July 2016, and he won the jūryō championship in September with a 12–3 record, which saw him promoted to the top makuuchi division. His rise to the top division in ten tournaments was the second fastest of modern times behind that of Jōkōryū who achieved the feat in nine tournaments in 2012. At this point he changed his shikona from Daiki to Hokutofuji, which was derived from the shikona of his stablemaster, former yokozuna Hokutoumi, and Hokutoumi's own stablemaster, former yokozuna Kitanofuji.

In August 2014, he participated in the Openweight competition at the Sumo World Championships held in Taiwan and finished third, behind Ukrainian wrestler Oleksandr Veresiuk and Mongolian Baasansuren Turbold, who won that year's tournament.

=== Makuuchi career ===
Hokutofuji came through with a solid 9–6 record in his top division debut and recorded 9 wins again in January 2017. In March he recorded the first make-koshi (losing record) of his career, but a 10–5 result in May saw him move up the rankings. In the July 2017 tournament he earned a kinboshi or gold star in his first ever match against a yokozuna, defeating Kakuryū, and finished with eight wins. On Day 4 of the September tournament he beat yokozuna Harumafuji to claim his second kinboshi. He was a runner-up to Hakuhō in the November 2017 tournament with an 11–4 record, and was awarded his first special prize, for Technique. He also defeated yokozuna Kisenosato in this tournament, earning his third kinboshi in his last three tournaments. In January 2018 he won a fourth straight kinboshi by defeating Hakuhō on Day 3, making him the second sumo wrestler after Tosanoumi to collect a gold star in four consecutive tournaments, but he finished the tournament with only four wins against eleven losses. In the May 2018 tournament he suffered a concussion during a false start at the tachi-ai in his match against Ryūden on Day 10. He withdrew from the rest of the tournament. Returning in July ranked at the bottom of the division at maegashira 16, he secured a winning record.

In March 2019 he made his sanyaku debut at komusubi rank. He was the third komusubi from Saitama Prefecture after Wakabayama in September 1951 and Wakachichibu in March 1959. He is also the fourth komusubi from Hakkaku stable following Kaiho, Hokutoriki and Okinoumi. In September 2019 he picked up his sixth kinboshi by defeating Hakuhō on the opening day. Following this victory he lost his next six matches to fall to 1-6 but made an impressive recovery by winning his final 8 matches to finish the tournament at 9-6. He returned to the komusubi rank in November, one of four komusubi in that tournament, but fell just short of a majority of wins with a 7–8 record. Back in the maegashira ranks in January 2020 he earned his seventh kinboshi by defeating Kakuryū on Day 3. He also beat both ōzeki, and finished the tournament with eleven wins and his second Technique Prize. He returned to the komusubi rank in March, and defeated Kakuryū again on Day 2, but finished the tournament with a 4–11 record. He has remained in the maegashira ranks since July 2020, and has alternated between winning and losing records for 16 straight tournaments up until May 2022. He was forced to withdraw from the July tournament on the final day due to COVID-19 protocols, although he already had a losing record by that point. In September he was the tournament leader after winning his first nine matches, but he lost five of his last six matches to finish with a 10–5 record.

In July 2023, Hokutofuji had a solid tournament, winning his twelfth match against ōzeki-promotion seekers, Hōshōryū. He also topped the rankings after the thirteenth day of the tournament, following a victory over maegashira Endō. Commenting on his performance, he expressed his desire to break his record for makuuchi wins with a twelfth victory over one of the other wrestlers competing for the title, the newly promoted Hakuōhō. In September, Hokutofuji revealed he injured his right calf during a training session prior to the sixth day of the tournament.

During the September tournament, Hokutofuji put in a remarkable performance on the first three days. At the rank of maegashira 1, he faced the three ōzeki of the time (Takakeishō, Kirishima and Hōshōryū) and won each of these matches. In an editorial for Sports Nippon, Tamanoi-oyakata praised Hokutofuji and his "veteran skills" and for overcoming his neck and knee injuries. This performance marks only the fifth time since the beginning of the Shōwa era that a wrestler not ranked in san'yaku has won three consecutive victories over ōzeki-ranked wrestlers. He was promoted to komusubi for the fourth time in November 2023, but won just 5 out of 15 matches and was demoted back to the maegashira ranks.

On Day 8 of the January 2024 tournament, Hokutofuji landed awkwardly at the end of his match against Hōshōryū. After he was helped up by attendants, Hokutofuji was taken to the Kokugikan's medical clinic in a wheelchair. He withdrew from the tournament the next day, with his medical certificate noting a right knee contusion requiring about two weeks of treatment.

=== Demotion and retirement ===
At the start of the January 2025 tournament it was announced that Hokutofuji underwent knee surgery and had also developed a herniated disc, resulting in his withdrawal. The health issues were expected to take until the end of that month to heal. In March 2025 he was demoted to jūryō for the first time in over eight years, and won only three matches before pulling out on the final day.

A few days after the start of the May 2025 tournament Hokutofuji, then ranked at makushita 3, announced his retirement from professional sumo. At his retirement press conference with his stablemaster and Sumo Association president Hakkaku, Hokutofuji recalled how he had started sumo at the age of 10 and had been working hard wearing the mawashi for 23 years. He recalled that his favorite matches were against Hakuhō and Mitakeumi, the latter he considered to be a rival since his school days. Hokutofuji intended to remain with the Sumo Association and Hakkaku stable as a coach under the elder name Ōyama.

Hokutofuji's retirement ceremony was held at the Ryōgoku Kokugikan on 30 May 2026. About 300 people attended the ceremony, including Muneo Suzuki, chairman of the Hakkaku stable support association, Chiharu Matsuyama and Takeshi Aikoh.

== Fighting style ==
Hokutofuji's performances suggested that he was an oshi-sumo specialist who favoured pushing techniques to fighting on the mawashi or belt. The oshidashi (push out) accounted for nearly half of his victories. Some of his other winning techniques included yorikiri (force out) and tsukiotoshi (thrust down).

== Personal life ==
Hokutofuji was married on 6 January 2020 to a Japanese woman named Manami, who is four years his senior. The couple's first child, a boy, was born in March 2021.

Hokutofuji and his wife were initially unable to hold a formal wedding reception due the COVID-19 pandemic. The wedding reception was officially held on 17 February 2024 at a hotel in Tokyo with about 600 attendees, including his stablemaster and Sumo Association president Hakkaku.

In July 2025, two months after retiring from professional competition, Hokutofuji told reporters that he had lost about 36 kg (79 lb) of weight, dropping to 128 kg (282 lb).

== Career record ==
Hokutofuji Daiki
Year	January Hatsu basho, Tokyo	March Haru basho, Osaka	May Natsu basho, Tokyo	July Nagoya basho, Nagoya	September Aki basho, Tokyo	November Kyūshū basho, Fukuoka
2015	x	(Maezumo)	East Jonokuchi #11; 6–1	East Jonidan #36; 7–0; Champion	East Sandanme #36; 7–0; Champion	East Makushita #25; 5–2
2016	East Makushita #16; 5–2	West Makushita #8; 5–2	West Makushita #1; 4–3	West Jūryō #13; 10–5	West Jūryō #6; 12–3; Champion	West Maegashira #11; 9–6
2017	East Maegashira #8; 9–6	West Maegashira #5; 7–8	East Maegashira #7; 10–5	West Maegashira #2; 8–7 ★	East Maegashira #2; 7–8 ★	West Maegashira #3; 11–4; T★
2018	East Maegashira #1; 4–11 ★	West Maegashira #6; 6–9	West Maegashira #9; 4–7–4	East Maegashira #16; 11–4	East Maegashira #9; 9–6	West Maegashira #1; 7–8 ★
2019	West Maegashira #2; 9–6	West Komusubi #1; 7–8	East Maegashira #1; 7–8	West Maegashira #1; 9–6	East Maegashira #1; 9–6 ★	East Komusubi #2; 7–8
2020	East Maegashira #2; 11–4; T★	East Komusubi #1; 4–11	West Maegashira #5; Tournament Cancelled; State of Emergency; 0–0–0	West Maegashira #5; 9–6	East Maegashira #2; 6–9	East Maegashira #4; 11–4
2021	East Maegashira #1; 7–8	East Maegashira #2; 9–6	West Maegashira #1; 6–9	East Maegashira #3; 8–7	East Maegashira #2; 2–3–10	West Maegashira #12; 11–4
2022	West Maegashira #4; 6–9	East Maegashira #6; 9–6	East Maegashira #3; 5–10	West Maegashira #7; 6–9	West Maegashira #8; 10–5	East Maegashira #5; 7–8
2023	East Maegashira #6; 7–8	East Maegashira #7; 7–8	East Maegashira #7; 6–9	West Maegashira #9; 12–3–P; F	East Maegashira #1; 8–7	West Komusubi #1; 5–10
2024	West Maegashira #3; 4–5–6	East Maegashira #9; 6–9	West Maegashira #11; 7–8	East Maegashira #13; 6–9	East Maegashira #13; 8–5–2	East Maegashira #12; 7–8
2025	East Maegashira #14; Sat out due to injury 0–0–15	East Jūryō #8; 3–12	West Makushita #3; Retired; 0–0–2	x	x	x
Record given as wins–losses–absences Top division champion Top division runner-up Retired Lower divisions Non-participation Sanshō key: F=Fighting spirit; O=Outstanding performance; T=Technique Also shown: ★=Kinboshi; P=Playoff(s); Divisions: Makuuchi — Jūryō — Makushita — Sandanme — Jonidan — Jonokuchi Makuuchi ranks: Yokozuna — Ōzeki — Sekiwake — Komusubi — Maegashira

== See also ==
- List of sumo tournament top division runners-up
- List of sumo tournament second division champions
- List of komusubi
- List of past sumo wrestlers
- Glossary of sumo terms
