= Takahiro Satō =

Japanese manga artist (1976–2018)

- 佐藤 タカヒロ
- Born: July 24, 1976
- Died: July 3, 2018 (aged 41)
- Notable work: Bachi Bachi
- Style: Manga

Takahiro Satō (佐藤 タカヒロ, Satō Takahiro; 24 July 1976 – 3 July 2018) was a Japanese manga artist from Yamagata prefecture.

Satō created the manga Bachi Bachi, a sumo series that ran in Weekly Shōnen Champion from 2009 to 2012. Bachi Bachi went on to spawn two sequel series, Bachi Bachi BURST and Samejima, Saigo no Jūgonichi. Satō suffered a sudden death on 3 July 2018 at the age of 41 due to acute coronary syndrome. Samejima, Saigo no Jūgonichi was still running at the time of his death, and the last issue was published in July 2018. The final chapters were compiled into the 20th volume, which went on to be published posthumously in October of the same year.

Sumo magazine Great Sumo Journal honored Satō with a special issue following his death, which featured the main character of Bachi Bachi. In November 2023, makuuchi-ranked wrestler Kitanowaka also paid tribute to Satō by performing his ring-entering ceremony with a keshō-mawashi made in the image of Samejima, the main character in Bachi Bachi.

== Bibliography ==
- Ippon (いっぽん!), Weekly Shōnen Champion, 2004–2006, 14 volumes
- Bachi Bachi (バチバチ), Weekly Shōnen Champion, 2009–2012, 16 volumes
  - Bachi Bachi Burst (バチバチ BURST), Weekly Shōnen Champion, 2012–2014, 12 volumes
  - Samejima, Saigo no Jūgonichi (鮫島、最後の十五日), Weekly Shōnen Champion, 2014–2018, 20 volumes
