= Kokonoe stable =

Organization of sumo wrestlers

Coordinates: 35.7000°N 139.8057°E

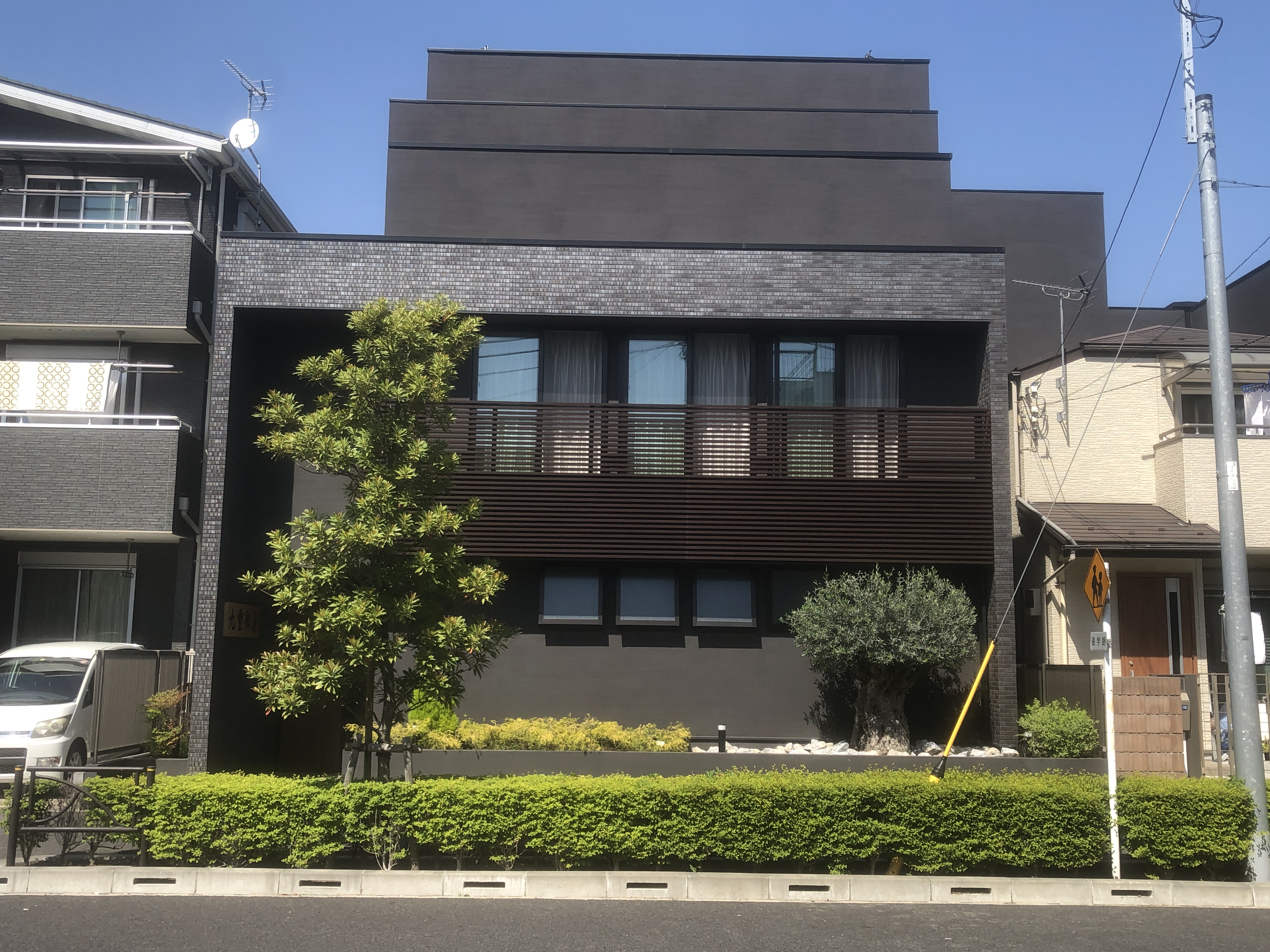

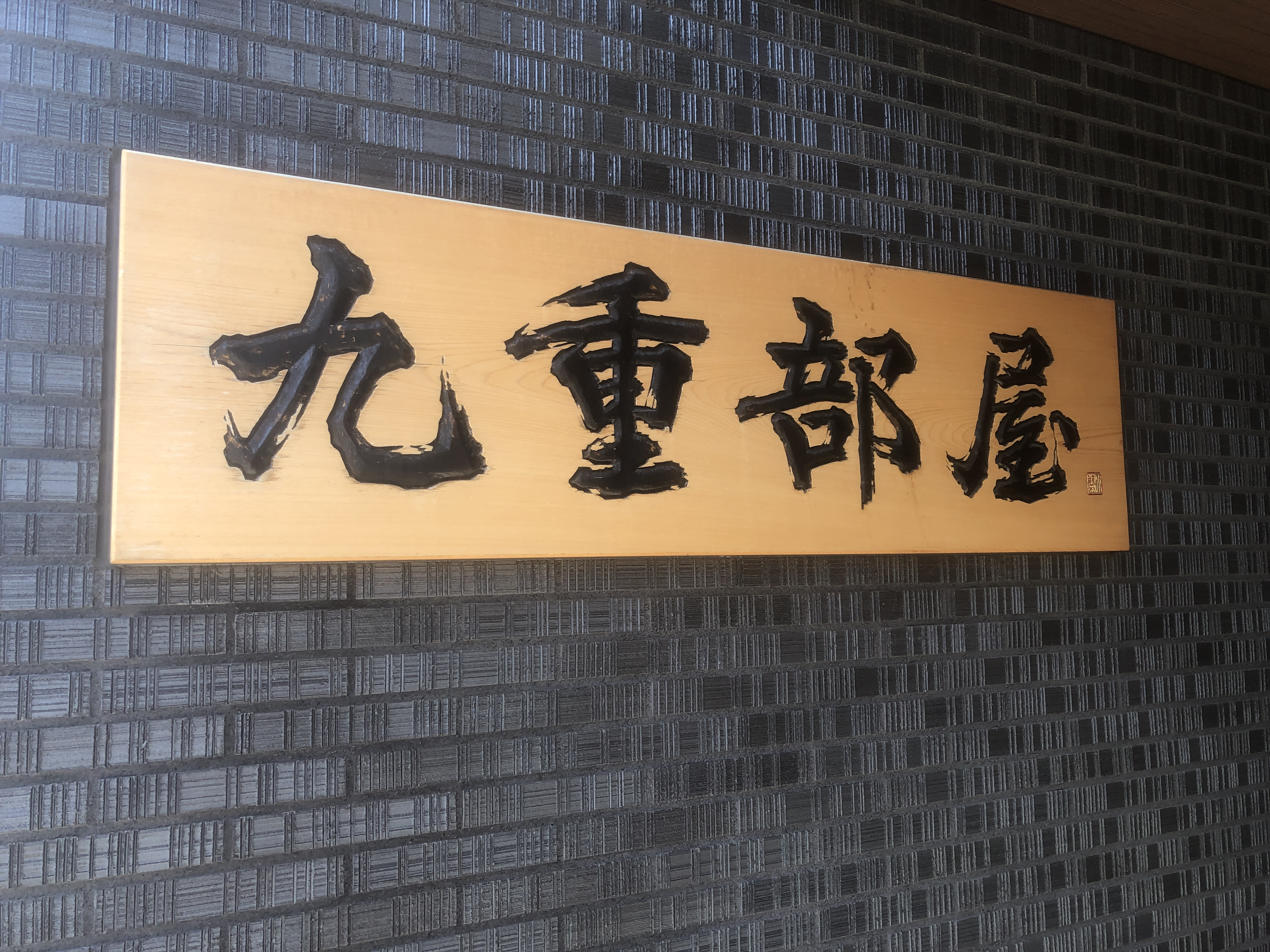

Kokonoe stable (九重部屋, Kokonoe beya) is a stable of sumo wrestlers, one of the Takasago group of stables. It was formed in 1967 and until 2021 was located in Ishiwara, Sumida, Tokyo. It is the most successful stable in terms of total yūshō won by its wrestlers, with 52.

As of May 2026, the stable has 19 active wrestlers.

== History ==
Former yokozuna Chiyonoyama of Dewanoumi stable had wanted to succeed to the Dewanoumi name, but the then Dewanoumi stablemaster (wrestler Dewanohana) had already decided to pass the name to former yokozuna Sadanoyama. Accordingly, in January 1967, he set up his own stable, taking with him, amongst others, then ōzeki Kitanofuji and attaching the new stable to the Takasago group of stables.

After Chiyonoyama died in 1977, Kitanofuji, who had already revived Izutsu stable, became the 11th Kokonoe, merging his stable with Kokonoe's and giving up the Izutzu elder name. He raised Chiyonofuji, then a makuuchi wrestler, to the great yokozuna he became. Later he also saw Hokutoumi become a yokozuna. Takanofuji and Fujinoshin also reached the top division.

In 1992, the year after Chiyonofuji retired from the ring, Kitanofuji handed over the stable to him. Chiyonofuji and Kitanofuji swapped names, Chiyonofuji becoming Kokonoe and gaining control of the stable, whilst Kitanofuji became Jinmaku, attached to Hakkaku stable, set up by the former Hokutoumi in 1993. In the early 1990s Kokonoe stable was one of the largest in sumo but had only one sekitori, Tomoefuji. Kokonoe eventually produced Chiyotenzan, briefly a komusubi in 1999, and long serving ōzeki Chiyotaikai (1999–2009), his most successful wrestler. Following the retirements of Chiyotaikai in January 2010 and Chiyohakuhō in April 2011, the stable had no sekitori for a short time, but Chiyonokuni reached jūryō in July 2011 and the top division in January 2012. Chiyotairyū followed afterwards and reached makuuchi in May 2012. By March 2014, Kokonoe stable was one of the most successful stables in sumo, with three men (Chiyotairyū, Chiyoōtori and Chiyomaru) in the top division and two (Chiyonokuni and Chiyonoō) in jūryō. In January 2016 the stable moved up to six sekitori with the promotion of Chiyoshōma, the most of any stable. As of September 2020 it remains at six, now level with Kise and one behind new leader Oitekaze.

Chiyonofuji died in July 2016. Sanoyama (the former Chiyotaikai) succeeded him as the Kokonoe stablemaster.

In February 2021 Kokonoe stable moved to new premises in Okudo, Katsushika ward. The previous space in Sumida was converted into a restaurant, Chanko Chiyonofuji, named after the late grand champion. The restaurant opened in February 2023 and overlooks the dohyō training space formerly used by the stable. Various trophies won by Chiyonofuji over the years are also displayed.

On 7 February 2023, Kokonoe stable, along with Ōshima stable and Futagoyama stable, signed a partnership and cooperation agreement with the Katsushika Ward of Tokyo. The agreement was presented as having the objective of cooperating further in a wide range of areas, including tourism, culture, sports, and educational promotion, and work closely to revitalize local communities.

In October 2023 it was announced that an underage makushita division wrestler was found to have been drinking during the autumn regional tour. The wrestler in question had arrived to the tour venue in Ōbu, Aichi on the morning of 15 October and was then transported to a hospital for acute alcohol poisoning. Kokonoe and the other wrestlers involved were expelled from the tour and returned to their stable in Tokyo. On 24 October it was announced that Kokonoe had been suspended for an undetermined amount of time, along with the underage wrestler. A second wrestler was suspended the following day. On 26 October Nikkan Sports, quoting a source, reported that Kononoe berated the wrestler that was caught drinking, both in the hospital and during a Sumo Association inquiry. The source added that Kokonoe had punished the wrestler during sumo workouts and had banned him from going out for one year. A few days before the suspensions were announced, the wrestler was said to have run away from Kokonoe stable to return to his parents and had his top knot cut off at a barber shop.

== Ring name conventions ==
Traditionally many wrestlers at this stable, often on reaching the sandanme division, take ring names or shikona that begin with the characters 千代 (read: chiyo), meaning "a thousand generations", in deference to the founder, Chiyonoyama and also his later successor Chiyonofuji. As of March 2018, all wrestlers at the stable, including those in the bottom two divisions, have this prefix.

== Owners ==
- 2016–present: 14th Kokonoe (yakuin taigū iin, ōzeki Chiyotaikai Ryūji)
- 1992–2016: 13th Kokonoe (Chiyonofuji Mitsugu, the 58th yokozuna)
- 1977–1992: 12th Kokonoe (Kitanofuji Katsuaki, the 52nd yokozuna)
- 1967–1977: 11th Kokonoe (Chiyonoyama Masanobu, the 41st yokozuna)

== Coach ==
- Tanigawa Hideki (iin, sekiwake Hokutōriki)
- Nishikijima Yūki (shunin, komusubi Chiyoōtori)
- Sanoyama Toshiki (toshiyori, maegashira Chiyonokuni)

== Assistant ==
- Chiyomaru (wakaimonogashira, maegashira, real name Kazuki Kinoshita)

== Notable active wrestlers ==
- Chiyoshōma (best rank maegashira)
- Chiyonoō (best rank maegashira)

== Notable former members ==
- Kitanofuji (the 52nd yokozuna)
- Chiyonofuji (the 58th yokozuna)
- Hokutoumi (the 61st yokozuna)
- Chiyotaikai (former ōzeki)
- Kitaseumi (former sekiwake)
- Chiyotairyū (former komusubi)
- Chiyotenzan (former komusubi)
- Takanofuji (former komusubi)
- Tomoefuji (former komusubi)
- Chiyomaru (former maegashira)
- Chiyonoumi (former jūryō)
- Chiyosakae (former jūryō)

== Referees ==
- 44th Shikimori Inosuke (tate-gyōji, real name Toshiaki Kojima)
- Kimura Ryunosuke (sandanme gyōji, real name Haruto Kajita)

== Ushers ==
- Shigeo (san'yaku yobidashi, real name Takumi Taniguchi)
- Shigetarō (jūryō yobidashi, real name Katsunori Hattori)
- Shigejiro (makushita yobidashi, real name Keisuke Miyagi)

== Hairdressers ==
- Tokotake (first class tokoyama)
- Tokokyū (second class tokoyama)

== See also ==
- List of sumo stables
- List of active sumo wrestlers
- List of past sumo wrestlers
- Glossary of sumo terms
