= Takeshi Aikoh =

Japanese baseball player (born 1962)

- Infielder
- Born: August 15, 1962 (age 63); Kanagawa, Japan
- Batted: Left Threw: Left

debut
- April 6, 1981, for the Lotte Orions

Last appearance
- 2000, for the Chunichi Dragons

NPB statistics
- Win–loss record: 0-2
- Earned run average: 6.70
- Strikeouts: 23
- Batting average: .269
- Home runs: 108
- Runs batted ins: 513
- Hits: 1,142

Teams
- Lotte Orions/Chiba Lotte Marines (1981–1995); Chunichi Dragons (1996–2000)

Takeshi Aikoh (愛甲 猛, Aikō Takeshi; born August 15, 1962 in Kanagawa, Japan) is a retired Nippon Professional Baseball player who played for the Lotte Orions and the Chunichi Dragons.
