= Hokutōriki Hideki =

Sumo wrestler

北勝力 英樹 Hokutōriki Hideki
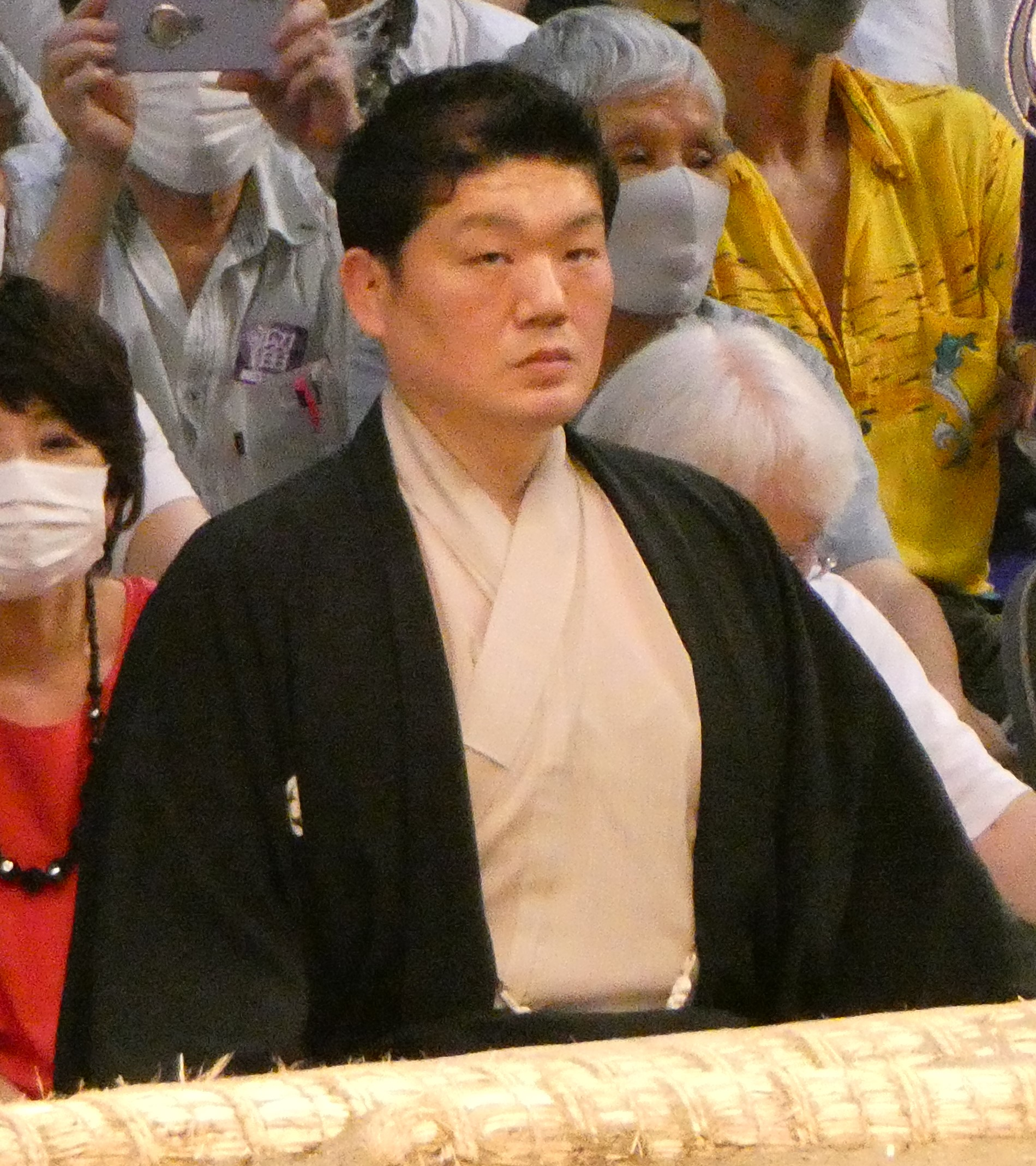

Personal information
- Born: Hideki Kimura; October 31, 1977 (age 48) Tochigi, Japan
- Height: 1.83 m (6 ft 0 in)
- Weight: 147 kg (324 lb; 23.1 st)

Sport
- Sport: Sumo
- Retired: May, 2011
- Heya: Hakkaku
- Record: 573-566-50
- Debut: March, 1993
- Highest rank: Sekiwake (July, 2004)
- Elder name: Tanigawa
- Championships: 1 (Sandanme)
- Special Prizes: Outstanding Performance (1); Fighting Spirit (3)
- Gold Stars: 1 (Asashōryū)
- Updated on May 2011

Hokutōriki Hideki (born October 31, 1977, as Hideki Kimura) is a former sumo wrestler, from Tochigi, Japan. He reached the top makuuchi division in 2002 and was runner-up in three tournaments. He had four special prizes in his career and a gold star for defeating a yokozuna. The highest rank he reached was sekiwake. He retired in May 2011 and is an elder of the Japan Sumo Association and a coach at Kokonoe stable.

== Career ==
He was born in Kurobane, a town in the Nasu District of Tochigi Prefecture. Hokutōriki made his professional debut in March 1993, joining Kokonoe stable. In October of that year he transferred to the newly created Hakkaku stable run by former yokozuna Hokutoumi. It took nearly nine years for him to achieve sekitori status by gaining promotion to the second jūryō division in January 2002. However, it took him only two further tournaments to reach the top makuuchi division. On his debut outing in makuuchi in May 2002 he made an immediate impression, finishing as runner-up with a strong 11–4 record and the fighting spirit prize. He was also a runner-up in the March 2003 tournament.

The highlight of Hokutōriki's career came in May 2004, the only occasion when he recorded a winning score from the upper maegashira ranks. Ranked at maegashira 1, he sensationally defeated Asashōryū on the sixth day - his first ever victory over a yokozuna. Asashōryū had won the previous two tournaments with unbeaten 15-0 records and was on a 35 bout winning streak. With Asashōryū suffering another defeat to Kyokutenhō on Day 11, Hokutōriki came into the final day the sole leader on 13–1, his only defeat in the tournament thus far being to Wakanosato on Day 8. However, he lost his senshuraku bout to Hakuhō, then in his debut top division tournament, being sidestepped by the 19-year-old after two false starts. With Asashōryū defeating Chiyotaikai, both Asashōryū and Hokutōriki were tied on 13-2 and had to meet again in a playoff for the championship, which Hokutōriki lost. Nevertheless, he was rewarded with special prizes for Fighting spirit and Outstanding Performance, and after the tournament he was promoted to sumo's third highest rank of sekiwake.

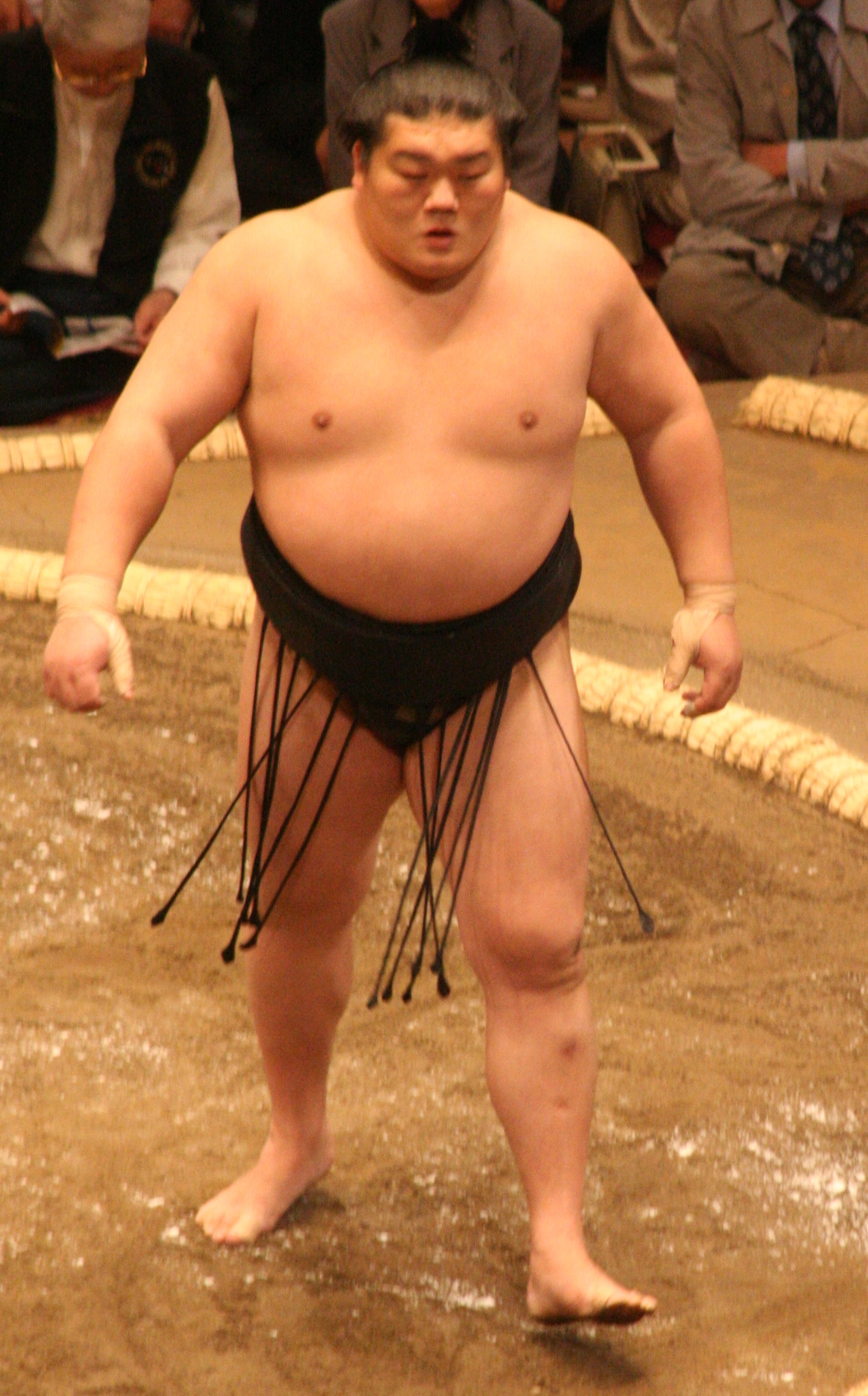
Hokutōriki in May 2009

Hokutōriki managed only a 3–12 record in his sekiwake debut and never managed a return to the san'yaku ranks, instead bouncing up and down the maegashira ranks. He is one of the few wrestlers (along with Kotetsuyama and Hayateumi) whose only tournament in san'yaku was at sekiwake rather than komusubi. He won another Fighting Spirit Award for his twelve wins from maegashira 11 in January 2006, but in November of that year he pulled out of the tournament on the ninth day with no wins at all and was relegated to the jūryō division. However, a 9–6 record at jūryō 4 in March 2007 was good enough to earn promotion back to the top division for the May 2007 tournament. Although he remained in makuuchi he did not manage to defeat a yokozuna again and had several disastrous openings to tournaments, going 0–10 in July 2008 from maegashira 2 and 0–12 in March 2009 from maegashira 1. In May 2009 another poor record of 4-11 saw him demoted to jūryō for the second time. However, an 11–4 score there returned him immediately to the top division.

He withdrew from the September 2010 tournament on the 13th day after suffering a neck injury, which also kept him out of the following tournament in November. Falling to the bottom of the jūryō division, he was unable to enter the January 2011 basho as well.

== Retirement from sumo ==
Hokutōriki did not enter the May 2011 technical examination tournament, at which he had fallen to the rank of makushita 13, and announced his retirement on Day 7. He remained in sumo as a coach at Hakkaku stable under the toshiyori or elder name of Tanigawa-oyakata. His danpatsu-shiki or retirement ceremony was held in May 2012. In June 2018 he transferred to Kokonoe stable.

== Fighting style ==
Hokutōriki relied almost exclusively on pushing and slapping techniques, with over a third of his wins coming by oshidashi, or push-out. He was usually defeated if his opponents managed to grab hold of his mawashi or belt. He often used henka, or sidestepping, to wrong-foot his opponents, and was adept at pull-downs and slap-downs. However, in the January 2008 tournament he was himself a victim of the henka tactic on three consecutive days, slipping from a score of 6–5 to 6–8.

== Personal life ==
Hokutōriki is married, and his first child, a daughter, was born in December 2007.

== Career record ==
Hokutōriki Hideki
Year	January Hatsu basho, Tokyo	March Haru basho, Osaka	May Natsu basho, Tokyo	July Nagoya basho, Nagoya	September Aki basho, Tokyo	November Kyūshū basho, Fukuoka
1993	x	(Maezumo)	West Jonokuchi #47; 4–3	West Jonidan #194; 3–4	West Jonokuchi #17; 3–4	East Jonokuchi #29; 5–2
1994	West Jonidan #156; 3–4	West Jonidan #177; 4–3	West Jonidan #138; 5–2	West Jonidan #90; 4–3	East Jonidan #66; 3–4	West Jonidan #83; 5–2
1995	East Jonidan #36; 4–3	East Jonidan #19; 0–7	West Jonidan #74; 4–3	East Jonidan #54; 6–1	East Sandanme #92; 3–4	West Jonidan #10; 4–3
1996	West Sandanme #90; 6–1	East Sandanme #36; 2–5	East Sandanme #68; 4–3	West Sandanme #48; 4–3	West Sandanme #30; 5–2	East Sandanme #5; 1–6
1997	East Sandanme #40; 4–3	East Sandanme #26; 5–2	West Sandanme #1; 5–2	West Makushita #39; 3–4	East Makushita #49; 5–2	East Makushita #30; 5–2
1998	West Makushita #17; 1–6	East Makushita #43; 4–3	East Makushita #35; 1–6	West Sandanme #2; 7–0; Champion	West Makushita #9; 3–4	West Makushita #14; 3–4
1999	West Makushita #22; 2–5	West Makushita #35; 4–3	East Makushita #27; 3–4	East Makushita #34; 6–1	East Makushita #14; 4–3	East Makushita #9; 2–5
2000	East Makushita #25; 5–2	East Makushita #12; 1–1–5	West Makushita #32; Sat out due to injury 0–0–7	West Makushita #32; 6–1	East Makushita #13; 5–2	East Makushita #6; 5–2
2001	West Makushita #3; 2–5	East Makushita #12; 3–4	East Makushita #18; 6–1	West Makushita #8; 4–3	West Makushita #6; 6–1	East Makushita #1; 5–2
2002	West Jūryō #10; 10–5	East Jūryō #6; 11–4	East Maegashira #14; 11–4; F	West Maegashira #5; 7–8	East Maegashira #6; 9–6	West Maegashira #2; 5–10
2003	East Maegashira #6; 4–11	East Maegashira #11; 10–5	West Maegashira #5; 6–9	West Maegashira #7; 10–5	West Maegashira #2; 4–11	East Maegashira #7; 10–5
2004	West Maegashira #1; 5–10	East Maegashira #6; 9–6	West Maegashira #1; 13–2–P; FO★	West Sekiwake #1; 3–12	East Maegashira #6; 5–10	West Maegashira #11; 8–7
2005	East Maegashira #8; 8–7	West Maegashira #5; 7–8	West Maegashira #6; 8–7	East Maegashira #5; 6–9	East Maegashira #7; 8–7	West Maegashira #1; 2–13
2006	East Maegashira #11; 12–3; F	West Maegashira #2; 1–14	West Maegashira #13; 10–5	East Maegashira #7; 4–11	East Maegashira #13; 10–5	East Maegashira #5; 0–9–6
2007	East Jūryō #1; 6–9	West Jūryō #4; 9–6	East Maegashira #16; 9–6	West Maegashira #10; 10–5	East Maegashira #3; 3–12	East Maegashira #10; 8–7
2008	West Maegashira #6; 7–8	West Maegashira #7; 8–7	West Maegashira #6; 10–5	West Maegashira #2; 4–11	East Maegashira #9; 8–7	West Maegashira #3; 5–10
2009	East Maegashira #7; 9–6	East Maegashira #1; 2–13	East Maegashira #13; 4–11	East Jūryō #4; 11–4	West Maegashira #14; 11–4	East Maegashira #4; 8–7
2010	East Maegashira #3; 3–12	West Maegashira #11; 6–9	West Maegashira #14; 7–8	West Maegashira #15; 8–7	East Maegashira #10; 4–9–2	East Maegashira #17; Sat out due to injury 0–0–15
2011	East Jūryō #12; Sat out due to injury 0–0–15	Tournament Cancelled; 0–0–0	West Makushita #13; Retired; 0–0–4	x	x	x
Record given as wins–losses–absences Top division champion Top division runner-up Retired Lower divisions Non-participation Sanshō key: F=Fighting spirit; O=Outstanding performance; T=Technique Also shown: ★=Kinboshi; P=Playoff(s); Divisions: Makuuchi — Jūryō — Makushita — Sandanme — Jonidan — Jonokuchi Makuuchi ranks: Yokozuna — Ōzeki — Sekiwake — Komusubi — Maegashira

== See also ==
- List of sumo tournament top division runners-up
- Glossary of sumo terms
- List of past sumo wrestlers
- List of sumo elders
- List of sekiwake
