= Hakkaku stable =

Organization of sumo wrestlers

Coordinates: 35.6975°N 139.7989°E

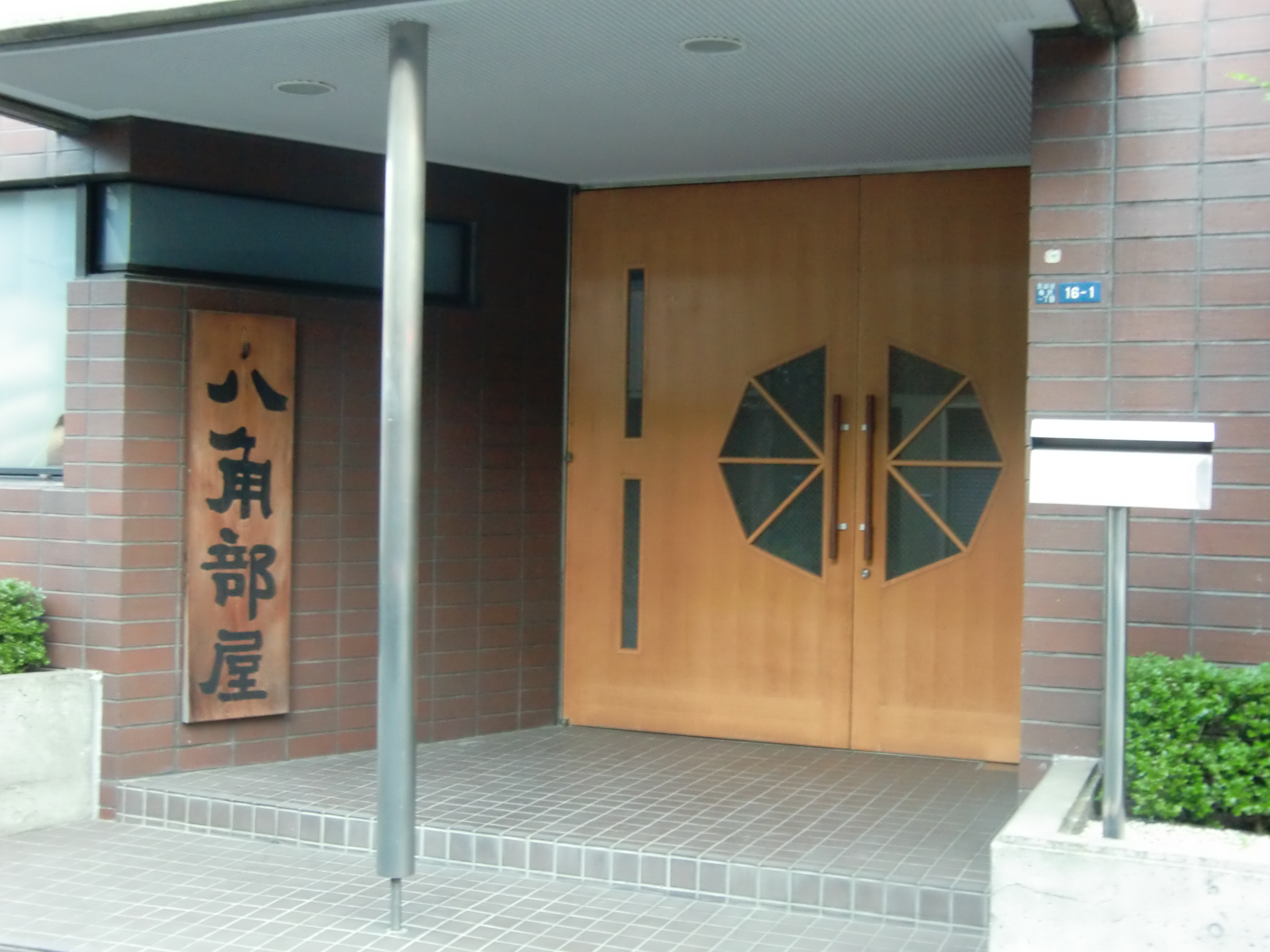
Entrance to Hakkaku stable

Hakkaku stable (八角部屋, Hakkaku-beya) is a stable of sumo wrestlers, part of the Takasago ichimon or group of stables. It was established in September 1993 by former yokozuna Hokutoumi, who took with him four wrestlers from Kokonoe stable. The stable has so far produced nine sekitori, four of whom have reached the makuuchi division.

Many Hakkaku wrestlers have the kanji 北勝 (pronounced hokuto or hokutō) in their ring name, taken from the former name of their head coach.

As of May 2026, the stable has 11 active wrestlers.

== Ring name conventions ==
Many wrestlers at this stable take ring names or shikona that begin with the character 北 (hoku, north) in deference to their coach and the stable's owner, the former Hokutoumi.

== Owner ==
- 1993–present: 8th Hakkaku Nobuyoshi (rijichō, the 61st yokozuna Hokutoumi, born 1963)

== Notable active wrestlers ==
- Kitanowaka (best rank maegashira, born 2000)

== Coaches ==
- Kimigahama Ayumi (shunin, sekiwake Okinoumi, born 1985)
- Azumazeki Seiken (iin, komusubi Takamisakari, born 1976)
- Ōyama Daiki (toshiyori, komusubi Hokutofuji, born 1992)
- Jinmaku Tetsuya (san'yo, maegashira Fujinoshin, born 1960)

== Assistant ==
- Okinofuji (sewanin, makushita 11, real name Kazuya Takedani, born 1988)

== Notable former members ==
- Hokutōriki Hideki (sekiwake, born 1977)
- Okinoumi Ayumi (sekiwake, born 1985)
- Kaihō Ryōji (komusubi, born 1973)
- Hokutofuji (komusubi, born 1992)
- Hokutoarashi Ryōta (makushita 6, born 1979)
- Hokudōzan Kazusada (makushita 45, born 1988)

== Referee ==
- Kimura Yōnosuke (makuuchi gyōji, real name Masashi Okuno, born 1975)
- Kimura Kozaburo (juryo gyōji, real name Ryōsuke Miyasaka, born 1983)

== Usher ==
- Daikichi (makuuchi yobidashi, real name Yūji Ōba, born 1972)

== Hairdresser ==
- Tokomichi (third class tokoyama, born 1987)
- Tokosho (fifth class tokoyama, born 2004)

== Location and Access ==
Tokyo, Sumida Ward, Kamezawa 1-16-1
3 minute walk from Toei Oedo Line Ryōgoku Station and 7 minute walk from Sōbu Line Ryōgoku Station
Adjacent to sister stable, Nishikido

== See also ==
- List of sumo stables
- List of active sumo wrestlers
- List of past sumo wrestlers
- Glossary of sumo terms
