= Chiyonofuji Mitsugu =

Japanese sumo wrestler (1955–2016)

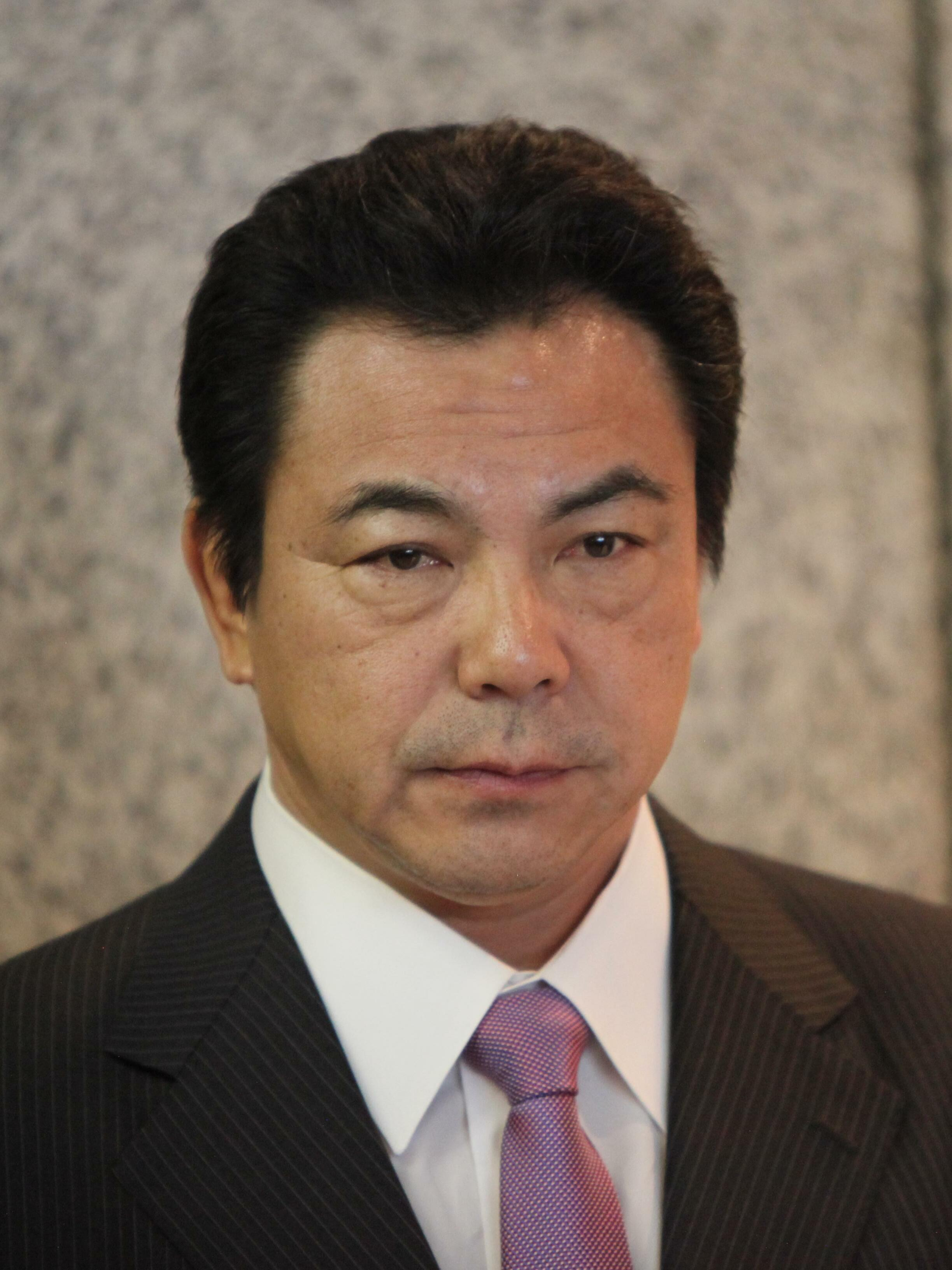
- Chiyonofuji in 2010

Personal information
- Native name: 千代の富士 貢
- Born: Mitsugu Akimoto; June 1, 1955 Fukushima, Hokkaido, Japan
- Died: July 31, 2016 (aged 61) Tokyo, Japan
- Height: 183 cm (6 ft 0 in)
- Weight: 126 kg (278 lb; 19 st 12 lb)

Sport
- Sport: Sumo
- Retired: May, 1991
- Heya: Kokonoe
- Record: 1045-437-170
- Debut: September, 1970
- Highest rank: Yokozuna (July, 1981)
- Elder name: Kokonoe
- Championships: 31 (Makuuchi); 1 (Makushita)
- Special Prizes: Outstanding Performance (1); Fighting Spirit (1); Technique (5)
- Gold Stars: 3 Mienoumi (2); Wakanohana II
- Updated on June 2020

Chiyonofuji Mitsugu (Japanese: 千代の富士 貢; June 1, 1955 – July 31, 2016), born Mitsugu Akimoto (秋元 貢, Akimoto Mitsugu), was a Japanese professional sumo wrestler and the 58th yokozuna of the sport.

Chiyonofuji is considered one of the greatest yokozunas in sumo's history, winning 31 tournament championships (yūshō) at the top division (makuuchi). This was second only to Taihō at the time of Chiyonofuji's retirement. He was particularly remarkable for his longevity in sumo's top rank, which he held for a period of ten years from 1981 to 1991. Promoted at the age of twenty-six after winning his second championship, his performance improved with age, winning more tournaments in his thirties than any other wrestler and dominating the sport in the second half of the 1980s. He finally retired in May 1991, just short of his thirty-sixth birthday. Following his retirement as a wrestler, he became an elder (oyakata) of the Japan Sumo Association and became the Kokonoe-oyakata the following year in 1992, serving as the stable master of Kokonoe stable until his death.

During his 21-year professional career, Chiyonofuji set records for most career victories (1045) and most wins in the top makuuchi division (807), earning an entry in the Guinness World Records, although both of these records were later broken by Kaiō. He won the November Kyushu tournament, one of the six annual honbasho, a record eight consecutive years from 1981 until 1988, and also set the record for the longest postwar run of consecutive wins (53 bouts in 1988). That record stood for 22 years until Hakuhō broke it with his 54th straight win in September 2010.

In a sport where weight is often regarded as vital, Chiyonofuji was comparatively light at around 120 kg (260 lb), making him the lightest yokozuna since Tochinoumi during the 1950s and 60s; he primarily relied on his muscle and superior technique to defeat his opponents. Chiyonofuji was a popular sumo wrestler who also went by his nickname "The Wolf" (ウルフ, Urufu) due to his muscular build atypical of most other sumo wrestlers, his competitive ferocity, and his appeal as a sex symbol owing to his body and his masculine facial features.

== Early life ==
He was born in Fukushima, a town in the Matsumae District of Hokkaido, northern Japan. He was a son of a fisherman. At school he excelled in athletics events, particularly running. He was scouted at the age of 15 by Kokonoe stable's head Chiyonoyama, who had served as the 41st yokozuna and was from the same Fukushima town. Chiyonoyama promised him a trip to Tokyo in an airplane, which excited the young Akimoto as he had never flown before.

== Early career ==
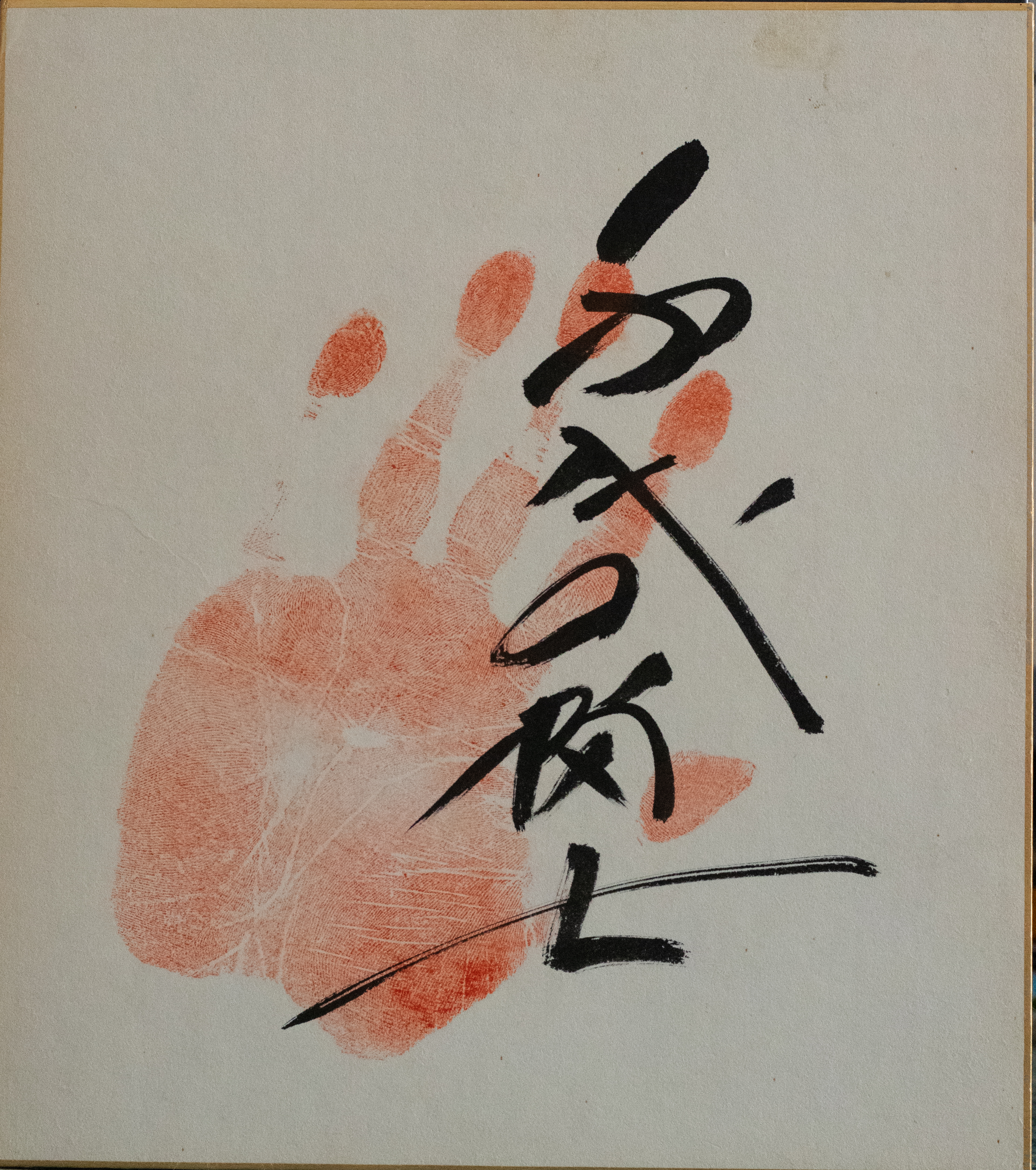
Chiyonofuji original tegata (handprint and signature)

When Mitsugu started his professional sumo career, he was given his shikona (ring name) surname of Chiyonofuji (千代の富士), which was formed from those of the two previous yokozuna from his stable, Chiyonoyama and Kitanofuji. Chiyo (千代, "thousand years") is a word used to mean forever, and Fuji (富士) is the same as that in Mount Fuji (富士山). At the time of his professional debut, he weighed just 71 kg (157 lb).

Chiyonofuji began his career in September 1970. He reached the second highest jūryō division in November 1974, and was promoted to the top makuuchi division in September 1975. However, he lasted only one tournament before being demoted again, and recurring shoulder dislocation injuries led to him falling back to the unsalaried ranks. During his time back below the salaried (sekitori) divisions, Chiyonoyama, his original master and the one who scouted and convinced him to join Kokonoe stable, died in 1977, after which Kitanofuji, the 52nd yokozuna and also a Hokkaido native, took over the stable.

He finally won promotion back to the top division in January 1978. After receiving a fighting spirit prize in May, Chiyonofuji reached komusubi (the fourth-highest rank) for the first time. During his early top division career he was often compared to another lightweight wrestler popular with sumo fans, Takanohana I. Takanohana had first come across Chiyonofuji whilst on a regional tour and encouraged him to give sumo a try. Later, he also advised Chiyonofuji to give up smoking, which helped him put on some extra weight.

In 1979, due to his shoulder trouble, Chiyonofuji briefly fell to the second division, but he soon came back. Encouraged by his stablemaster, he began to rely not only on throwing techniques, which increased the risk of re-injuring his shoulders, but also on gaining ground quickly and forcing out his opponents. Showing much more consistency, he earned three kinboshi by defeating yokozuna in the March and July 1980 tournaments, where he also got technique prizes. He fought again as a komusubi in the May and September tournaments, in the latter of which he won 10 matches in the top division for the first time. Chiyonofuji reached sekiwake (the third-highest rank), and stayed at this rank for only two tournaments. As a sekiwake, he scored 11–4 in November, and in January 1981 he scored 14–1, losing only one regular match to dominating yokozuna Kitanoumi, and then defeated him in the subsequent playoff to win a top makuuchi division title for the first time. This earned him promotion to ōzeki, the second-highest rank. While making this speedy rise, he won the technique prize in the three previous tournaments, and won it again in that January 1981 tournament where he also earned the outstanding performance prize. As an ōzeki he scored well in the following three tournaments up to July 1981, where he again defeated Kitanoumi and won his second title. After this victory, he was promoted to yokozuna, the 58th in sumo history.

== Yokozuna ==
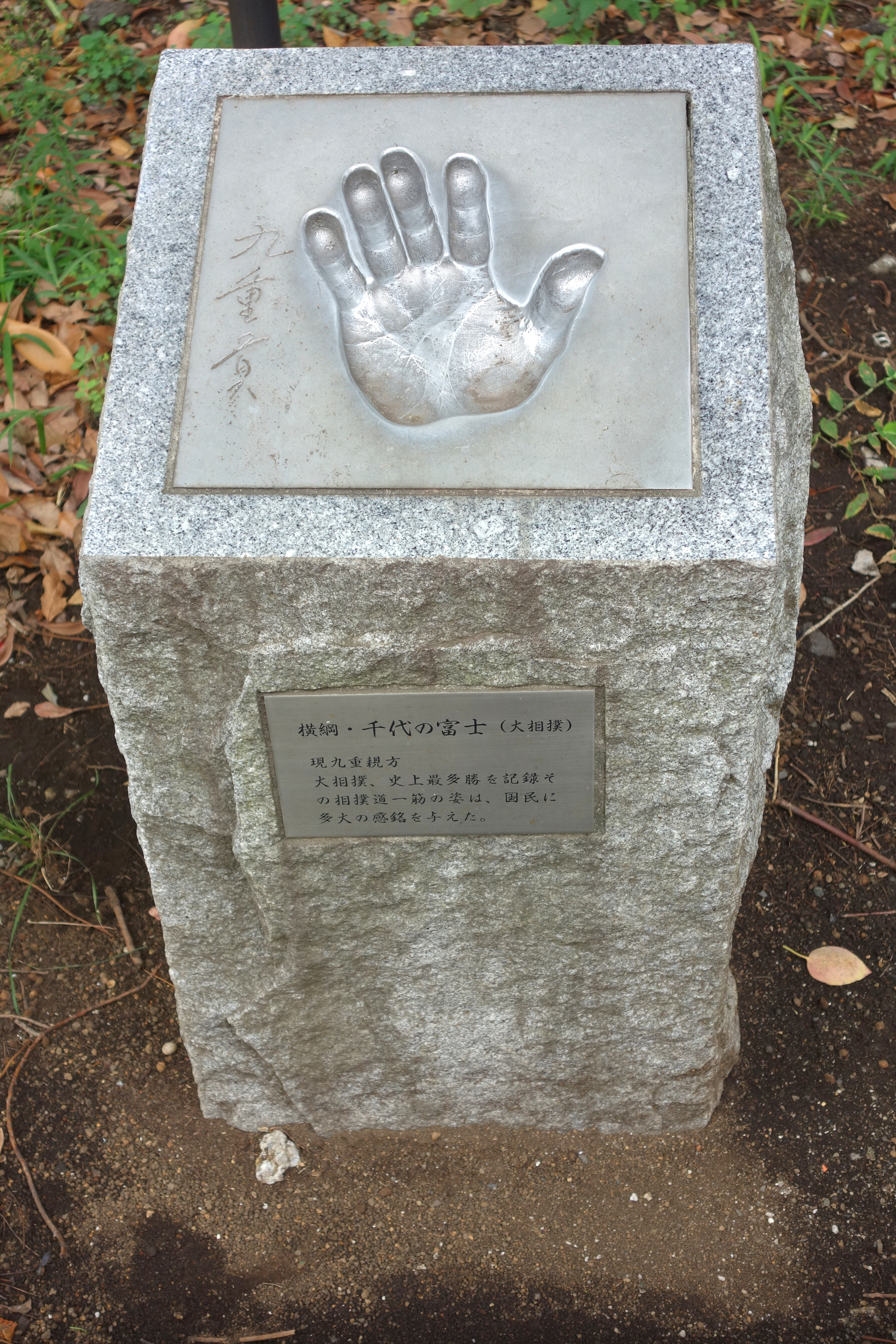
A stone marker of Chiyonofuji's handprint

Chiyonofuji had to pull out of his first tournament as a yokozuna with an injury, but he returned to win the championship in November, defeating Asashio in a playoff. He later said that this victory was the foundation upon which he built his subsequent success as a yokozuna. He was to win the Kyushu tournament eight consecutive years from 1981 to 1988, a record dominance of any of the six specific honbasho.

As his rival Kitanoumi went into a long slump, Chiyonofuji dominated sumo in 1982, winning four of the six tournaments. However, another yokozuna, Takanosato, emerged over the next two years to challenge him, and he also suffered a number of injury problems. Chiyonofuji was restricted to just one championship in the nine tournaments held from May 1983 to September 1984. But Kitanoumi retired in January 1985, with the aging Takanosato following a year later, and Chiyonofuji resumed his dominance. In 1986 he won five out of the six tournaments held, the first time this had been done since Kitanoumi in 1978. Despite being older and lighter than nearly all his opponents, he dominated the sport throughout the 1980s.

In 1988, he went on a winning streak of 53 bouts, the third longest in sumo history, behind yokozuna Hakuhō's 63, and Futabayama's all-time record of 69. The sequence began on the 7th day of the May 1988 tournament with victory over Hananoumi and continued through the July and September 1988 tournaments, ending only on the final day of the November 1988 tournament when he was defeated by Ōnokuni. Had he won that bout, he would have been the first wrestler ever to win three consecutive tournaments with 15–0 records. Nonetheless, his winning run was the best ever in the postwar period, surpassing the 45 bouts won by Taihō in 1968 and 1969. In July 1989 he took his 28th championship in a playoff from his stablemate Hokutoumi, marking the first time ever that two yokozuna from the same stable had met in competition. In September 1989 Chiyonofuji surpassed Ōshio's record of 964 career wins and became the first sumo wrestler to receive the People's Honour Award from the Japanese Prime Minister. In March 1990, he secured his 1000th win. A 32nd tournament title would have tied the record set by Taihō in 1971, but his 31st championship in November 1990 proved to be his last.

In the opening tournament of 1991, Chiyonofuji surpassed Kitanoumi's record of 804 top division wins but injured himself on the second day and had to withdraw. He returned in May, but he lost on the opening day of the tournament to the 18-year-old rising star and future yokozuna Takanohana Kōji (then known as Takahanada). It was estimated that half of the Japanese population watched the match on TV. Coincidentally, Takahanada's father, Takanohana Kenshi, had retired in 1981 shortly after losing to Chiyonofuji. Chiyonofuji beat Itai on the next day, but this was to be his final win. After losing another match with Takatōriki on the third day, Chiyonofuji announced his own retirement, a few weeks short of his 36th birthday.

== Retirement from the ring ==
In September 1989 while Chiyonofuji was still active, the Japan Sumo Association decided to proffer the special status of ichidai-toshiyori (one-generation sumo-elder using his ring name as his elder name) to him, but he declined it because he intended to inherit another elder name. Following his retirement from the ring in May 1991, Chiyonofuji inherited the elder name of Jinmaku; then in 1992 he purchased the Kokonoe stable from Kitanofuji and the two exchanged their elder names (Jinmaku and Kokonoe). The purchase price of the stable was reported as being around 50 million yen, below the market rate for a stable. Under his leadership, the stable produced several top wrestlers including former ōzeki Chiyotaikai, former komusubi Chiyotenzan and former maegashira Chiyohakuhō. At the time of his death in 2016, Kokonoe stable was one of the most successful stables in sumo in terms of quantity of sekitori, with four men (Chiyotairyū, Chiyomaru, Chiyonokuni, and Chiyootori) in the top division and two (Chiyoshoma and Chiyonoō) in jūryō. He also served for some years as a ringside judge.

In February 2008, he joined the board of directors of the Japan Sumo Association, where he was responsible for organising the regional tours or jungyō, but he had to resign in April 2011 after his wrestler Chiyohakuhō admitted involvement in match-fixing and retired from sumo. He returned in the January 2012 elections as the Operations director (the second most senior position in the Association's hierarchy), but was unseated two years later. He chose not to run for a board position in the 2016 elections, citing a lack of support.

On May 31, 2015, he marked his 60th birthday by performing the kanreki dohyō-iri at the Ryōgoku Kokugikan, becoming the tenth former yokozuna to do so. Two active yokozuna were his attendants, with Hakuhō the tachimochi and Harumafuji acting as tsuyuharai.

== Family ==
Chiyonofuji announced his engagement to Kumiko Akimoto shortly after his fifth tournament championship in May 1982. They had a son and three daughters. His second daughter, Kozue Akimoto, born in 1987, is a fashion model. His youngest daughter Ai died at the age of four months, shortly before the July tournament of 1989.

== Death ==
Chiyonofuji had surgery for pancreatic cancer in July 2015, and was noticeably weak when speaking to reporters at the Aki basho in September of that year. Having reportedly told associates that the cancer had spread to his heart and lungs, he had been hospitalized since the fourth day of the Nagoya tournament in 2016. He died in Tokyo on July 31, 2016, at the age of 61. The chairman of the Japan Sumo Association, former yokozuna Hokutoumi who was a stablemate and protégé of Chiyonofuji, was too grief-stricken to speak to the press in the immediate aftermath of Chiyonofuji's death. His former stablemaster, ex-yokozuna Kitanofuji, said that he was "blessed with a wonderful disciple". Another former yokozuna, Takanohana, who hastened Chiyonofuji's retirement by defeating him in 1991, recalled his fear of Chiyonofuji's "metal body" when training with him. On August 2 the Sumo Association announced that a farewell ceremony for Chiyonofuji would be held at the entrance of the Ryōgoku Kokugikan on October 1.

== Fighting style ==
Throughout his career, Chiyonofuji's trademark kimarite or technique was uwatenage, or overarm throw. He preferred a migi-yotsu, or left hand outside, right hand inside grip on his opponent's mawashi. His left hand outer grip was so effective that some commentators referred to it as his "death grip". Uwatenage was his second most common winning technique at sekitori level after yorikiri, or force out. He was also well known for tsuridashi, or lift out. He had knowledge of a wide range of other techniques as well, employing 41 different kimarite in his career. In January 1987, he won with the very rare amiuchi, or fisherman's net casting throw, and joked to the press afterwards that it was appropriate for him as he was the son of a fisherman. Chiyonofuji's muscular physique, athleticism and dramatic throws made him the most successful and one of the most popular wrestlers of his day.

== Career record ==
Chiyonofuji Mitsugu
| Year | January Hatsu basho, Tokyo | March Haru basho, Osaka | May Natsu basho, Tokyo | July Nagoya basho, Nagoya | September Aki basho, Tokyo | November Kyūshū basho, Fukuoka |
|---|---|---|---|---|---|---|
| 1970 | x | x | x | x | (Maezumō) | East Jonokuchi #10; 5–2 |
| 1971 | East Jonidan #57; 4–3 | West Jonidan #38; 4–3 | West Jonidan #19; 4–3 | West Jonidan #5; 3–4 | West Jonidan #26; 5–2 | East Sandanme #61; Sat out due to injury 0–0–7 |
| 1972 | West Jonidan #19; 5–2 | West Sandanme #60; 5–2 | East Sandanme #31; 4–3 | West Sandanme #20; 5–2 | East Makushita #59; 3–4 | East Sandanme #8; 4–3 |
| 1973 | East Makushita #59; 4–3 | East Makushita #51; 4–3 | East Makushita #45; 2–2–3 | West Sandanme #2; 6–1 | East Makushita #31; 5–2 | West Makushita #18; 3–4 |
| 1974 | West Makushita #25; 5–2 | East Makushita #15; 4–3 | East Makushita #11; 3–4 | East Makushita #20; 5–2 | East Makushita #11; 7–0–P; Champion | East Jūryō #12; 9–6 |
| 1975 | West Jūryō #4; 6–9 | West Jūryō #8; 8–7 | West Jūryō #6; 9–6 | East Jūryō #2; 9–6 | East Maegashira #12; 5–10 | East Jūryō #4; 4–8–3 |
| 1976 | West Jūryō #13; 4–11 | East Makushita #7; 5–2 | West Makushita #1; 4–3 | West Jūryō #13; 9–6 | East Jūryō #10; 8–7 | East Jūryō #6; 5–10 |
| 1977 | East Jūryō #11; 8–7 | West Jūryō #10; 10–5 | East Jūryō #2; 5–10 | West Jūryō #9; 8–7 | East Jūryō #7; 10–5 | East Jūryō #1; 9–6 |
| 1978 | East Maegashira #12; 8–7 | East Maegashira #8; 8–7 | East Maegashira #5; 9–6; F | West Komusubi #1; 5–10 | East Maegashira #4; 4–11 | West Maegashira #10; 9–6 |
| 1979 | East Maegashira #4; 5–10 | West Maegashira #8; 2–6–7 | West Jūryō #2; 9–4–2 | West Maegashira #14; 8–7 | East Maegashira #10; 8–7 | East Maegashira #7; 7–8 |
| 1980 | East Maegashira #8; 8–7 | East Maegashira #3; 8–7; T★★ | West Komusubi #1; 6–9 | West Maegashira #2; 9–6; T★ | East Komusubi #1; 10–5; T | East Sekiwake #1; 11–4; T |
| 1981 | East Sekiwake #1; 14–1–P; TO | East Ōzeki #1; 11–4 | East Ōzeki #1; 13–2 | East Ōzeki #1; 14–1 | West Yokozuna-Ōzeki #1; 1–2–12 | East Yokozuna #2; 12–3–P |
| 1982 | East Yokozuna #2; 12–3 | West Yokozuna #1; 13–2 | East Yokozuna #1; 13–2–P | East Yokozuna #1; 12–3 | East Yokozuna #1; 10–5 | East Yokozuna #1; 14–1 |
| 1983 | East Yokozuna #1; 12–3 | East Yokozuna #1; 15–0 | East Yokozuna #1; Sat out due to injury 0–0–15 | East Yokozuna #1; 13–2 | East Yokozuna #1; 14–1 | West Yokozuna #1; 14–1 |
| 1984 | East Yokozuna #1; 12–3 | West Yokozuna #1; 4–4–7 | East Yokozuna #2; 11–4 | Yokozuna #2; Sat out due to injury 0–0–15 | East Yokozuna #2; 10–5 | West Yokozuna #1; 14–1 |
| 1985 | East Yokozuna #1; 15–0 | East Yokozuna #1; 11–4 | East Yokozuna #1; 14–1 | East Yokozuna #1; 11–4 | East Yokozuna #1; 15–0 | East Yokozuna #1; 14–1 |
| 1986 | East Yokozuna #1; 13–2 | East Yokozuna #1; 1–2–12 | East Yokozuna #1; 13–2 | East Yokozuna #1; 14–1–P | East Yokozuna #1; 14–1 | East Yokozuna #1; 13–2 |
| 1987 | East Yokozuna #1; 12–3–P | East Yokozuna #1; 11–4 | East Yokozuna #1; 10–5 | East Yokozuna #1; 14–1 | East Yokozuna #1; 9–2–4 | East Yokozuna #2; 15–0 |
| 1988 | East Yokozuna #1; 12–3 | East Yokozuna #1; Sat out due to injury 0–0–15 | East Yokozuna #2; 14–1 | East Yokozuna #1; 15–0 | East Yokozuna #1; 15–0 | East Yokozuna #1; 14–1 |
| 1989 | East Yokozuna #1; 11–4 | West Yokozuna #1; 14–1 | East Yokozuna #1; Sat out due to injury 0–0–15 | East Yokozuna #2; 12–3–P | West Yokozuna #1; 15–0 | East Yokozuna #1; 13–2 |
| 1990 | East Yokozuna #1; 14–1 | East Yokozuna #1; 10–5 | West Yokozuna #1; 13–2 | East Yokozuna #1; 12–3 | East Yokozuna #1; Sat out due to injury 0–0–15 | East Yokozuna #2; 13–2 |
| 1991 | East Yokozuna #1; 2–1–12 | West Yokozuna #2; Sat out due to injury 0–0–15 | West Yokozuna #2; Retired; 1–3 | x | x | x |
Record given as wins–losses–absences Top division champion Top division runner-up Retired Non-participation Jūryō Lower divisions Sanshō key: F=Fighting spirit; O=Outstanding performance; T=Technique Also shown: ★=Kinboshi; P=Playoff(s); Divisions: Makuuchi — Jūryō — Makushita — Sandanme — Jonidan — Jonokuchi Makuuchi ranks: Yokozuna — Ōzeki — Sekiwake — Komusubi — Maegashira

== Honours ==
- People's Honour Award (1989)
- Order of the Rising Sun, 3rd Class, Gold Rays with Neck Ribbon (2016, posthumous)
- Junior Fourth Rank (2016, posthumous)

== See also ==
- Glossary of sumo terms
- Kanreki dohyo-iri
- List of past sumo wrestlers
- List of sumo record holders
- List of sumo tournament top division champions
- List of sumo tournament top division runners-up
- List of yokozuna

== Bibliography ==
- Sharnoff, Lora (1993). Grand Sumo:The Living Sport and Tradition. Weatherhill. ISBN 0-8348-0283-X.

| Preceded by Mienoumi Tsuyoshi | 58th Yokozuna; 1981–1991 | Succeeded by Takanosato Toshihide |
Yokozuna is not a successive rank, and more than one wrestler can hold the title at once
