= Okinoumi Ayumi =

Japanese sumo wrestler

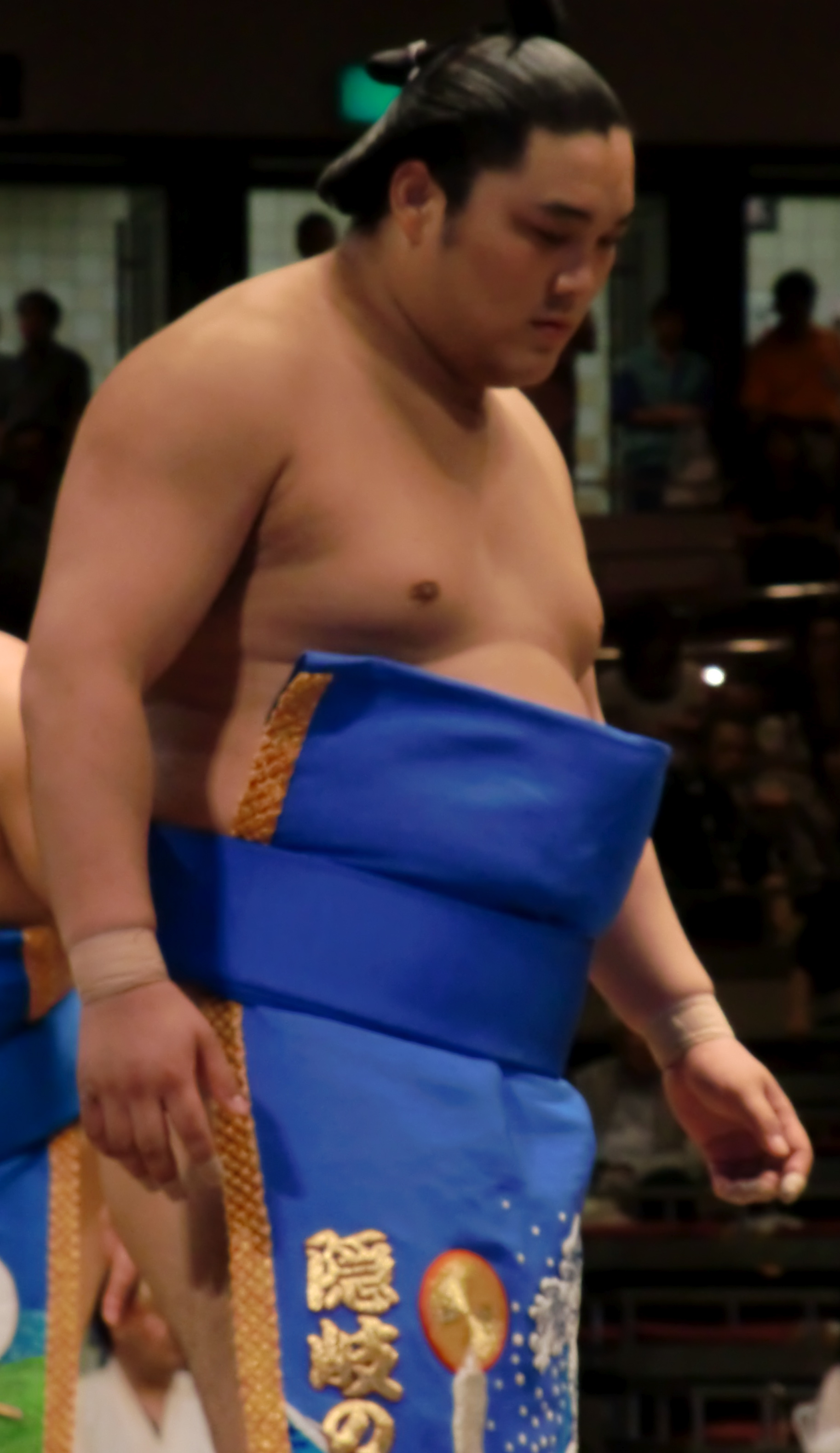
- Okinoumi in 2009

Personal information
- Born: Ayumi Fukuoka; 29 July 1985 (age 41) Okinoshima, Shimane, Japan
- Height: 1.91 m (6 ft 3 in)
- Weight: 158 kg (348 lb; 24.9 st)

Sport
- Sport: Sumo
- Retired: 14 January 2023
- Heya: Hakkaku
- Record: 674-675-33
- Debut: January, 2005
- Highest rank: Sekiwake (Mar, 2015)
- Elder name: Kimigahama
- Championships: 1 (Makushita)
- Special Prizes: Fighting Spirit (4); Outstanding Performance (1)
- Gold Stars: 4 Harumafuji (3); Kakuryū (1)
- Updated on 14 January 2023

Okinoumi Ayumi (Japanese: 隠岐の海 歩, Hepburn: Okinoumi Ayumi; born 29 July 1985 as Ayumi Fukuoka (福岡 歩, Fukuoka Ayumi)) is a former Japanese professional sumo wrestler from Okinoshima, Shimane. He joined professional sumo in 2005, reaching the top division in 2010. He was runner-up in makuuchi three times in the January 2011, March 2013, and November 2017 tournaments, all with an 11–4 record. His highest rank was sekiwake, which he held for one tournament in March 2015 and then held again in November 2016. He has won four Fighting Spirit prizes, one prize for Outstanding Performance, and four gold stars for defeating yokozuna. He wrestled for Hakkaku stable. Upon his retirement, Okinoumi became a sumo coach under the name of Kimigahama.

== Early life and sumo background ==
At school he attended local sumo clubs and took part in national competitions, but had no desire to take up sumo as a profession, instead wanting to go to sea and taking examinations to become a licensed mariner. However, he ended up dropping out of high school and was introduced by an acquaintance to Hakkaku-oyakata, the 61st yokozuna Hokutoumi, who persuaded him to join his Hakkaku stable.

Okinoumi is known for his good looks. His stablemaster joked at a press conference after Okinoumi's promotion to jūryō that this made him envious.

== Career ==
He began his professional career in January 2005, fighting under his family name of Fukuoka. He was promoted to the second highest jūryō division after taking the yūshō or tournament championship in the makushita division in January 2009 with a perfect 7–0 record. He changed his shikona to Okinoumi, a reference to his birthplace of Okinoshima (a tiny and remote island in Western Japan) which had been suggested by his father. He became the first sekitori from the Oki Islands since 1960. Troubled by a shoulder injury, he was demoted from jūryō after two losing records, but after reverting to the name Fukuoka he won immediate promotion back to jūryō in July 2009. Fighting as Okinoumi once again, in January 2010 he won promotion to the top makuuchi division, becoming the first wrestler from Shimane Prefecture to do so in 88 years. He came through with a kachi-koshi or winning record in his debut makuuchi tournament in March, winning his last three bouts to score 8–7. This saw him promoted to maegashira 10 for May.

He was suspended from the July 2010 tournament, along with several other wrestlers, after admitting involvement in illegal gambling on baseball. As a result, he dropped back to jūryō for September. Ranked at jūryō 8, a 10–5 record was enough to return him to the top division for the November tournament, where he secured his majority of wins on the final day. His best performance to date came in the January 2011 tournament where he finished runner-up to yokozuna Hakuhō and received his first sanshō award, for Fighting Spirit. This saw him promoted to a new highest rank of maegashira 4 for the May 2011 "technical examination tournament." There he fought all the top-ranked men for the first time and defeated three ōzeki: Kaiō, Harumafuji and Kotoōshū. He lost his last two bouts, to komusubi Kakuryū and Toyonoshima, to fall to a make-koshi 7–8 but remained at the same rank for the next tournament. Securing his majority of wins on the final day of the July tournament, he reached a new highest rank of maegashira 1 in September. He achieved his first gold star win against Harumafuji in November 2012, and his second Fighting Spirit award and second runner-up performance at maegashira 7 in March 2013. He managed two non-consecutive komusubi appearances in 2013, but he slid down the rankings after four consecutive losing tournaments in 2014.

Following the January tournament in 2015 he was promoted to sekiwake from the relatively low rank of maegashira 6, benefiting from the failure of most of those ranked directly above him to get winning records. He was the first sekiwake from Shimane Prefecture in 121 years. He was injured in his sekiwake debut and had to withdraw from the tournament. Nine wins in May and eleven in July 2015 saw him promoted to the san'yaku ranks for the fourth time (three at komusubi, and one at sekiwake). He was unable to hold the rank, scoring 6–9, and he also had a losing record in his fourth attempt at komusubi in May 2016. He picked up a kinboshi from maegashira 2 in July 2016, and had a very successful start to the September tournament, defeating ōzeki Kisenosato on opening day, Kakuryū on Day 2 and Harumafuji on Day 3. By the sixth day he had defeated two yokozuna and three ozeki and was the undefeated tournament co-leader. However he began losing in the second week of the tournament and finished on 9–6. He was rewarded for this efforts with his first Outstanding Performance Prize, and promotion back to sekiwake.

The November 2016 tournament did not go well for Okinoumi who had a lingering injury that had caused him to miss the autumn tour. He ended the tournament with only a 5–10 record and fell back to the maegashira ranks. In the November 2017 tournament Okinoumi was a runner-up to Hakuhō with an 11–4 record, and was awarded his third Fighting Spirit prize, shared with Aminishiki. In September 2019 Okinoumi won his first eight matches to lead the tournament outright. He finished on 11–4 and received his fourth (and final) Fighting Spirit Award. In July 2020 Okinoumi returned to the komusubi rank for the first time since 2016, and secured his first winning record in san'yaku with a 9–6 score.

== Retirement ==
Okinoumi withdrew from the January 2023 tournament after he was defeated in his first five matches. On the day of his withdrawal the Sanin Chūō Shimpō newspaper reported that Okinoumi had decided to retire. His retirement was confirmed by the Japan Sumo Association the next day, on 14 January 2023. At the time of his retirement he was the second-oldest active wrestler in the top two divisions behind Tamawashi. At his retirement press conference, Okinoumi said that for several years he had to rely on mental strength to overcome his inability to perform his style of sumo and that it had recently become too exhausting.

Okinoumi finished his career with a total of 75 tournaments ranked in the top division, eight of them in san'yaku. He had acquired toshiyori kabu, or elder stock, in the Sumo Association prior to his retirement. He is now a coach under the name of Kimigahama-oyakata. He opened his own Twitter account on the day of his retirement, as he was no longer subject to the Sumo Association's SNS ban.

On 30 September 2023 Okinoumi's danpatsu-shiki (retirement ceremony) was held at the Ryōgoku Kokugikan. About 300 people took turns in the ceremonial snipping of Okinoumi's ōichōmage before the final cut was made by his stablemaster and Sumo Association chairman Hakkaku. During the ceremony, Okinoumi's final match was held against his sandanme-ranked stablemate Okinofuji, who is also from Okinoumi's home town of Okinoshima. The matches were held in a traditional sumo style unique to Okinoshima called okikoten-zumō, which involved ringside spectators throwing generous amounts of salt toward the competitors as a method of encouragement.

== Fighting style ==
Okinoumi was a yotsu-sumo fighter, preferring grappling techniques to pushing or thrusting. His most common winning kimarite was yori-kiri or force out, and he favoured a migi-yotsu grip on the mawashi, with his left hand outside and right hand inside his opponent's arms. He also regularly used uwatenage, or overarm throw.

== Career record ==
Okinoumi Ayumi
Year	January Hatsu basho, Tokyo	March Haru basho, Osaka	May Natsu basho, Tokyo	July Nagoya basho, Nagoya	September Aki basho, Tokyo	November Kyūshū basho, Fukuoka
2005	(Maezumo)	West Jonokuchi #33; 4–3	East Jonidan #112; 6–1	East Jonidan #30; 5–2	East Sandanme #95; 4–3	West Sandanme #77; 6–1
2006	West Sandanme #21; 5–2	East Makushita #58; 4–3	West Makushita #48; 5–2	East Makushita #29; 2–5	West Makushita #48; 5–2	West Makushita #33; 5–2
2007	East Makushita #21; 4–3	East Makushita #16; 3–4	East Makushita #24; 3–4	West Makushita #32; 2–5	West Makushita #47; 5–2	West Makushita #31; 5–2
2008	East Makushita #19; 2–5	West Makushita #33; 5–2	East Makushita #18; 5–2	West Makushita #9; 4–3	West Makushita #7; 5–2	West Makushita #1; 5–2
2009	East Makushita #1; 7–0; Champion	East Jūryō #7; 4–11	East Jūryō #13; 5–10	East Makushita #4; 4–3	West Jūryō #14; 10–5	West Jūryō #5; 8–7
2010	East Jūryō #2; 10–5	East Maegashira #12; 8–7	West Maegashira #10; 5–10	West Maegashira #14; Suspended; 0–0–15	East Jūryō #8; 10–5	West Maegashira #16; 8–7
2011	East Maegashira #13; 11–4; F	East Maegashira #4; Tournament Cancelled; Match fixing investigation 0–0–0	East Maegashira #4; 7–8	East Maegashira #4; 8–7	West Maegashira #1; 8–7	East Maegashira #1; 7–8
2012	East Maegashira #2; 4–11	East Maegashira #9; 8–7	East Maegashira #5; 10–5	West Maegashira #2; 4–11	West Maegashira #8; 11–4	East Maegashira #1; 2–8–5 ★
2013	West Maegashira #10; 8–7	East Maegashira #7; 11–4; F	West Komusubi #1; 4–11	West Maegashira #6; 9–6	East Maegashira #2; 8–7	West Komusubi #1; 7–8
2014	West Maegashira #1; 7–8	East Maegashira #2; 4–11	West Maegashira #9; 6–9	East Maegashira #13; 6–8–1	West Maegashira #15; 10–5	East Maegashira #7; 8–7
2015	East Maegashira #6; 9–6	West Sekiwake #1; 0–4–11	West Maegashira #10; 9–6	East Maegashira #5; 11–4	West Komusubi #1; 6–9	West Maegashira #2; 5–10
2016	West Maegashira #6; 10–5	East Maegashira #2; 8–7	West Komusubi #1; 6–9	East Maegashira #2; 8–7 ★	East Maegashira #1; 9–6; O★★	West Sekiwake #1; 5–10
2017	East Maegashira #3; 4–11	West Maegashira #8; 10–5	East Maegashira #2; 3–12	West Maegashira #9; 5–10	West Maegashira #14; 8–7	East Maegashira #12; 11–4; F
2018	East Maegashira #5; 5–10	East Maegashira #9; 7–8	East Maegashira #10; 5–10	West Maegashira #14; 8–7	East Maegashira #12; 8–7	West Maegashira #11; 11–4
2019	West Maegashira #4; 7–8	East Maegashira #6; 8–7	East Maegashira #4; 5–10	West Maegashira #8; 8–7	East Maegashira #8; 11–4; F	West Maegashira #1; 6–9
2020	East Maegashira #4; 8–7	East Maegashira #2; 8–7	West Komusubi #1; Tournament Cancelled; State of Emergency; 0–0–0	West Komusubi #1; 9–6	East Komusubi #1; 4–11	West Maegashira #3; 6–9
2021	West Maegashira #5; 7–8	West Maegashira #5; 3–12	West Maegashira #12; 9–6	East Maegashira #5; 5–10	East Maegashira #8; 10–5	East Maegashira #3; 7–8
2022	East Maegashira #4; 4–11	West Maegashira #7; 5–10	East Maegashira #10; 9–6	East Maegashira #7; 4–10–1	East Maegashira #12; 6–9	East Maegashira #13; 8–7
2023	West Maegashira #12; Retired; 0–6–1	x	x	x	x	x
Record given as wins–losses–absences Top division champion Top division runner-up Retired Lower divisions Non-participation Sanshō key: F=Fighting spirit; O=Outstanding performance; T=Technique Also shown: ★=Kinboshi; P=Playoff(s); Divisions: Makuuchi — Jūryō — Makushita — Sandanme — Jonidan — Jonokuchi Makuuchi ranks: Yokozuna — Ōzeki — Sekiwake — Komusubi — Maegashira

== See also ==
- List of sumo tournament top division runners-up
- List of active gold star earners
- Glossary of sumo terms
- List of active sumo wrestlers
- List of sekiwake
- Active special prize winners
