= Hokutoumi Nobuyoshi =

Japanese sumo wrestler

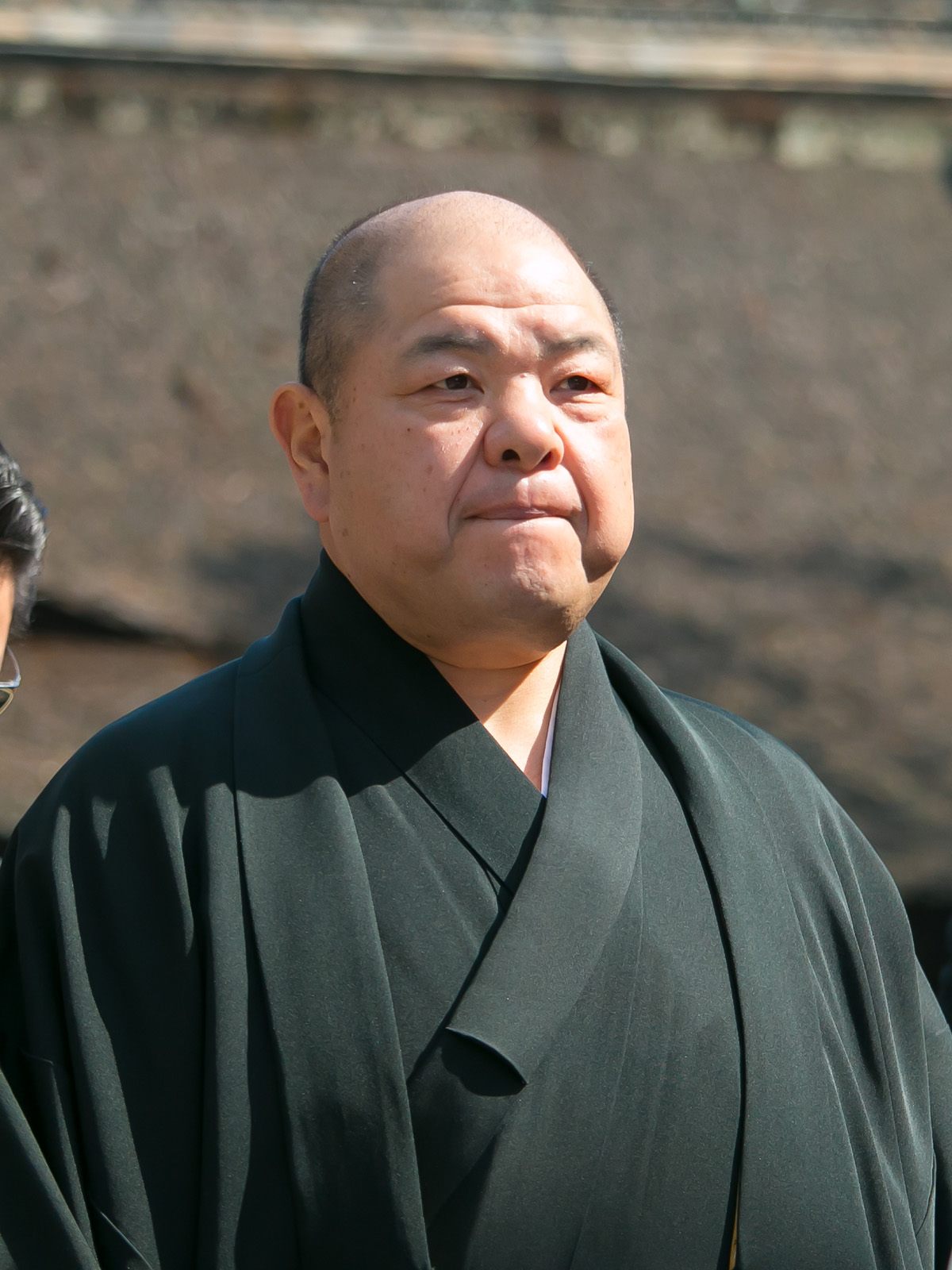
- Hokutoumi at Sumiyoshi-taisha, March 2017

Personal information
- Native name: 北勝海 信芳
- Born: Nobuyoshi Hoshi; June 22, 1963 (age 63) Hiroo, Hokkaidō, Japan
- Height: 1.81 m (5 ft 11 in)
- Weight: 151 kg (333 lb)

Sport
- Sport: Sumo
- Retired: May 1992
- Heya: Kokonoe
- Record: 591-286-109
- Debut: March 1979
- Highest rank: Yokozuna (May, 1987)
- Elder name: Hakkaku
- Championships: 8 (Makuuchi); 1 (Jūryō); 1 (Makushita); 1 (Jonidan)
- Special Prizes: Outstanding Performance (3); Fighting Spirit (3); Technique (5)
- Gold Stars: 1 (Kitanoumi)

Hokutoumi Nobuyoshi (Japanese: 北勝海 信芳; born June 22, 1963 as Nobuyoshi Hoshi (保志 信芳)) is a Japanese former professional sumo wrestler from Hokkaidō. He was the sport's 61st yokozuna and won eight top division championships. He wrestled for Kokonoe stable. In 1989 he and Chiyonofuji were the first yokozuna stablemates to take part in a play-off for the championship. After a number of injury problems he retired in 1992, and is now the head coach of Hakkaku stable. In November 2015 he was appointed chairman of the Japan Sumo Association, following the death of Kitanoumi, initially to serve until the end of March 2016. He was then elected as head for a full term by his fellow board members in a vote held in March 2016. He was reappointed to a full term as chairman five times, most recently in 2026.

== Early life ==
Hoshi was born in Hiroo, Hokkaidō. An uncle was an acquaintance of former yokozuna Kitanofuji, who by then had retired from competition and was running Kokonoe stable, and at his invitation Hoshi moved to Tokyo. Upon leaving school, his first appearance in the ring was March 1979, aged just 15, using his real name as his shikona or ring name. Also starting at the same time was future yokozuna Futahaguro.

== Makuuchi ==
It took him four years to reach the second-highest jūryō division in March 1983, aged 19, the same time as fellow Tokachi district rival Ōnokuni entered the top division. By this time his stablemate Chiyonofuji had been promoted to yokozuna. Hokutoumi made his debut in the top makuuchi division in September 1983. He changed the spelling of his shikona's given name to 延芳 in November 1985.

In March 1986 at the sekiwake rank he won his first yūshō or tournament championship with a record of thirteen wins and two losses. Despite this impressive result he was not immediately promoted to the second-highest ōzeki rank as he had not done particularly well in the previous two tournaments, only managing 30 wins in the most recent three tournaments when 33 is generally required. It also did not help his cause that there were already five ōzeki, leaving the Sumo Association with no incentive to loosen the promotion criteria. However, he carried on producing excellent results with an 11–4 in May, and then went 12–3 in July, securing his promotion for the September tournament. Futahaguro was promoted to yokozuna at the same time.

At this point, his coach decided a new ring name was appropriate. He wished to acknowledge his home district of Tokachi, but the kanji for it literally means "ten wins" and it was felt that this might be bad luck, limiting his wins in any tournament to ten. As a compromise he adopted the surname Hokutoumi, taking 勝 ("win") from the second kanji in Tokachi, but pronouncing it to like the first kanji in the district's name. He also changed the spelling of Nobuyoshi back to his legal way.

== Yokozuna ==
After his second tournament title in March 1987 and a runner-up performance in May, he was promoted to yokozuna for the July tournament. During his yokozuna dohyō-iri at the Meiji Shrine in 1987, Hokutoumi unusually used a set of personal keshō-mawashi because his master Kokonoe (former yokozuna Kitanofuji) had had three keshō-mawashi made in his name for him while he was still ōzeki. In 1988 he suffered a severe back injury which kept him out of three tournaments. It also appeared he would miss the start of the January 1989 tournament, but it was delayed due to the death of the emperor, and he went on to win the tournament. He also won the May tournament. In July, he took part in an historic play-off with Chiyonofuji – the first time ever that two yokozuna from the same stable had met in the ring (the rules of sumo state that wrestlers from the same stable can only fight each other in a play-off); Hokutoumi ending up losing the playoff and the championship to Chiyonofuji.

On the last day of the March 1990 tournament, he fought in a rare three-way play-off with ōzeki Konishiki and sekiwake Kirishima. In a play-off, wrestlers fight each other in turn, the first to win two consecutive bouts winning the tournament. First, Hokutoumi fought Konishiki and lost. Konishiki was then drawn up against Kirishima. Konishiki only needed to win this bout for the tournament, but Kirishima won. Next was Kirishima against Hokutoumi, Kirishima needing just this bout for his first yūshō. Hokutoumi won. Hokutoumi then beat Konishiki in the next bout, thus winning the tournament.

On the fourteenth day of the March 1991 tournament, he injured his left knee during a bout with Ōnokuni, but managed to go on to win the tournament with 13 wins. After this, Hokutoumi had many absences due to his knee. In October 1991 he was awarded the Japan Festival Trophy after winning an exhibition tournament at the Royal Albert Hall in London. At the start of 1991 there were four yokozuna, but Chiyonofuji retired in May 1991, Ōnokuni in July and Asahifuji in January of the next year (1992), leaving Hokutoumi the sole yokozuna. Left with this responsibility he struggled on, but he withdrew from the March 1992 tournament after losing his first two matches to Mitoizumi and Kushimaumi, and announced his retirement shortly before the May 1992 tournament at the age of 28 years and 10 months. Citing shoulder, elbow and knee injuries, he said he had "lost my fighting spirit to continue training." In the space of just one year, all four yokozuna had retired. Hokutoumi had fought 29 basho as yokozuna. Following his retirement, there were no yokozuna on the banzuke for the first time in 60 years, and sumo went without one for the next eight months, until the promotion of Akebono in January 1993.

== Retirement from the ring ==
Following his retirement Hokutoumi became a member of the Japan Sumo Association with the toshiyori name "Hakkaku". He opened up his own stable, Hakkaku stable, which has had four top division wrestlers, Hokutōriki, Kaihō, Okinoumi, and Hokutofuji. He occasionally appears on NHK sumo broadcasts as a commentator and analyst.

On December 18, 2015, he was appointed chairman of the Japan Sumo Association, after former chairman Kitanoumi died in office on November 20, 2015. He had been serving as an executive director of the board under Kitanoumi since 2012. His appointment lasted until the end of March 2016. He then won a contested ballot on March 28, 2016, defeating Takanohana, and was confirmed for a further two-year term. He was re-elected for additional two-year terms in 2018, 2020 and 2022.

Taking advantage of his abundant work experience and broad perspective, such as the general manager of the public relations department and the general manager of the business department, he implemented various reforms and fan services as the chairman. In January 2017, the "Social Contribution Department" was established for the purpose of supporting areas affected by various disasters. At the Nagoya Basho in July of the same year, a donation box was set up in the venue to support the areas affected by the heavy rains in northern Kyushu, and he said, "I hope it helps."

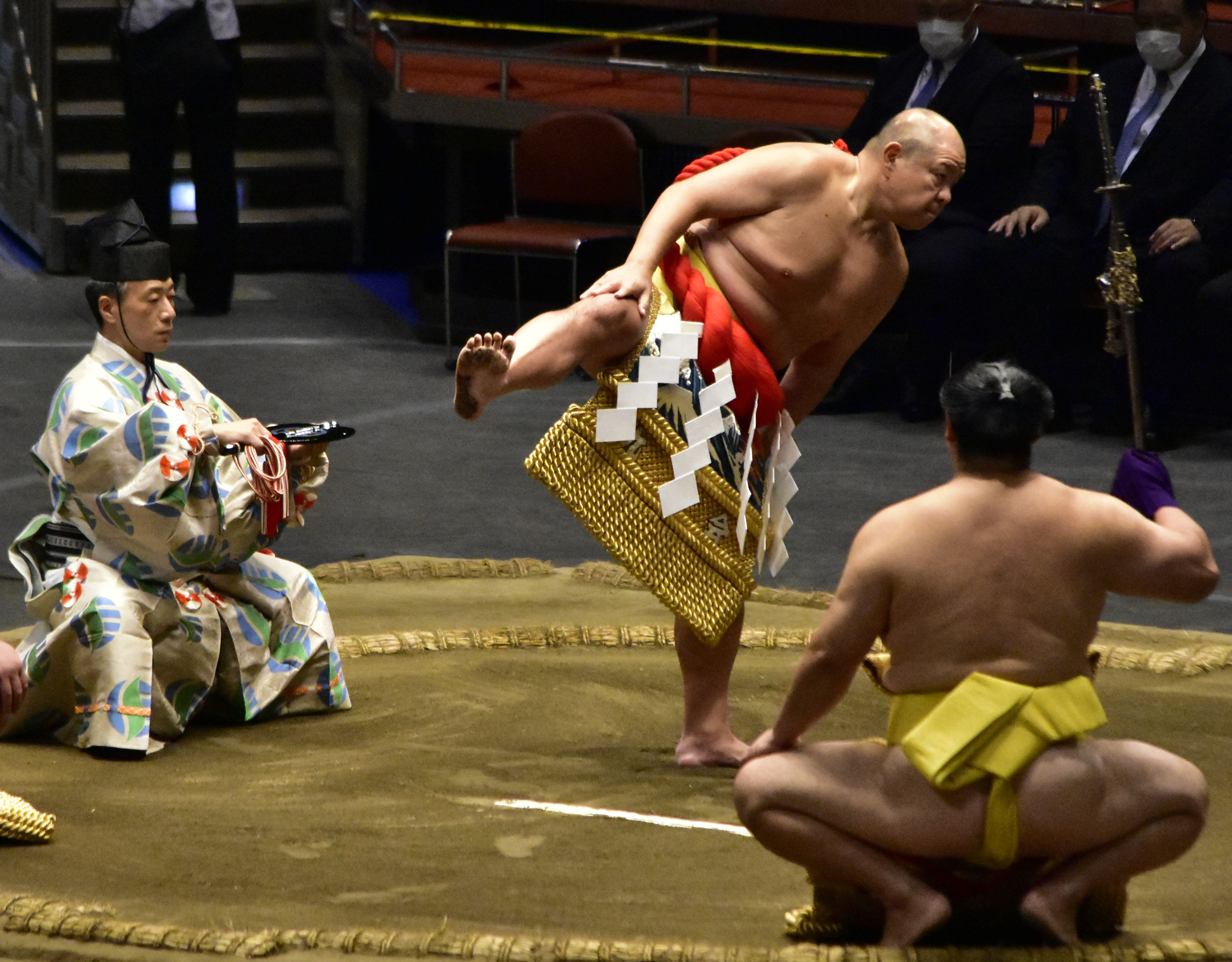
Hokutoumi performing his kanreki dohyō-iri in 2023

On his sixtieth birthday, on 22 June 2023, Hokutoumi declared his intention to perform a kanreki dohyō-iri at the Ryōgoku Kokugikan on 2 September of the same year. The event is of particular importance as it is expected to be the result of a combination of several major factors. The event marks 30 years since the creation of Hakkaku stable and, to celebrate the occasion, the Yokozuna Deliberation Council will also be holding a training session (sōken) which will be public and free for the first time in four years since the COVID crisis. The organisation of this training session in parallel with the 60th anniversary ceremony makes this kanreki dohyō-iri the first event of its kind to be free and open to the public. Hokutoumi also announced his choice of attendants for the event, in the person of his two students, Okinoumi, as tachimochi (sword-bearer), and Hokutofuji as tsuyuharai (dew sweeper). For the event Hokutoumi also chose to wear the keshō-mawashi set he wore during his first yokozuna dohyō-iri at the Meiji Shrine in 1987. The event will be the first time in ten years that a Sumo Association chairman performed his kanreki dohyō-iri since Kitanoumi Toshimitsu performed it during his fourth term in 2013. On 23 August 2023 members of Hakkaku stable participated in the tsunauchi to create the red tsuna that Hokutoumi will wear for the ceremony. Hokutoumi's kanreki dohyō-iri was held on 2 September 2023 at the Ryōgoku Kokugikan in front of approximately 4,000 people who came to attend the Yokozuna Deliberation Council's training session. Commenting after the ceremony, Hokutoumi said he was relieved. "I thought I was going to have fun and take it slow," he said, "but it just happened in the blink of an eye".

Following the London tour organized by the Japan Sumo Association in October 2025, Hokutoumi was awarded honorary citizenship of the City of London in recognition of "his significant contribution to the field of sports and the success of the London event".

== Fighting style ==
Hokutoumi was primarily an oshi-sumo specialist, preferring pushing and thrusting techniques that got his opponents out of the ring as quickly as possible. He had a powerful tachi-ai, or initial charge, and his specialty was nodowa, a single-handed push to the throat. To do this he would lock up his opponent's right arm with his left (a technique known as ottsuke) and thrust with his right. His most common winning kimarite by far were oshi-dashi and yori-kiri, which together accounted for around 60 percent of his wins at sekitori level. When fighting on the mawashi he preferred a migi-yotsu (left hand outside, right hand inside) grip. He said in an interview with Channel 4 television that the technique he most enjoyed was tsuri-dashi or lift out, although he was only credited with this kimarite once in official tournament competition (against Terao in November 1989).

== Career record ==
Hokutoumi Nobuyoshi
Year	January Hatsu basho, Tokyo	March Haru basho, Osaka	May Natsu basho, Tokyo	July Nagoya basho, Nagoya	September Aki basho, Tokyo	November Kyūshū basho, Fukuoka
1979	x	(Maezumo)	East Jonokuchi #15; 5–2	West Jonidan #84; 7–0; Champion	West Sandanme #85; 3–4	West Jonidan #6; 3–4
1980	West Jonidan #20; 5–2	East Sandanme #71; 3–4	West Sandanme #88; 4–3	West Sandanme #78; 4–3	East Sandanme #61; 4–3	East Sandanme #39; 2–5
1981	East Sandanme #60; 6–1	East Sandanme #14; 5–2	East Makushita #50; 3–4	East Makushita #57; 5–2	East Makushita #39; 4–3	East Makushita #29; 5–2
1982	East Makushita #14; 4–3	East Makushita #10; 3–4	East Makushita #18; 5–2	East Makushita #10; 3–4	East Makushita #22; 6–1	East Makushita #7; 4–3
1983	East Makushita #4; 7–0; Champion	West Jūryō #10; 8–7	East Jūryō #6; 8–7	East Jūryō #5; 10–5–P; Champion	West Maegashira #13; 8–7	East Maegashira #7; 9–6; F
1984	East Komusubi #1; 9–6; F	West Sekiwake #1; 6–9	East Maegashira #1; 6–9	West Maegashira #3; 9–6	East Komusubi #1; 7–8	East Maegashira #1; 9–6; T★
1985	West Sekiwake #1; 10–5; O	East Sekiwake #1; 8–7	East Sekiwake #2; 7–8	West Komusubi #1; 10–5; T	East Komusubi #1; 8–7	West Sekiwake #1; 9–6; T
1986	East Sekiwake #1; 8–7; T	West Sekiwake #1; 13–2; TO	East Sekiwake #1; 11–4; F	East Sekiwake #1; 12–3; O	East Ōzeki #1; 12–3	East Ōzeki #1; 8–7
1987	East Ōzeki #2; 11–4	West Ōzeki #1; 12–3	East Ōzeki #1; 13–2	East Yokozuna #2; 11–4	West Yokozuna #1; 14–1	East Yokozuna #1; 13–2
1988	West Yokozuna #1; 11–4	West Yokozuna #1; 13–2–P	East Yokozuna #1; 11–4	West Yokozuna #1; Sat out due to injury 0–0–15	East Yokozuna #2; Sat out due to injury 0–0–15	East Yokozuna #2; Sat out due to injury 0–0–15
1989	East Yokozuna #2; 14–1–P	East Yokozuna #1; 11–4	East Yokozuna #2; 13–2–P	East Yokozuna #1; 12–3–P	East Yokozuna #1; 11–4	West Yokozuna #1; 11–4
1990	West Yokozuna #1; 11–4	West Yokozuna #1; 13–2–PPP	East Yokozuna #1; 10–5	West Yokozuna #1; 10–5	East Yokozuna #2; 14–1	East Yokozuna #1; 9–6
1991	West Yokozuna #2; 12–3	East Yokozuna #1; 13–2	East Yokozuna #1; Sat out due to injury 0–0–15	West Yokozuna #1; 9–6	East Yokozuna #1; Sat out due to injury 0–0–15	West Yokozuna #1; 4–4–7
1992	East Yokozuna #1; Sat out due to injury 0–0–15	East Yokozuna #1; 0–3–12	East Yokozuna #1; Retired –	x	x	x
Record given as wins–losses–absences Top division champion Top division runner-up Retired Lower divisions Non-participation Sanshō key: F=Fighting spirit; O=Outstanding performance; T=Technique Also shown: ★=Kinboshi; P=Playoff(s); Divisions: Makuuchi — Jūryō — Makushita — Sandanme — Jonidan — Jonokuchi Makuuchi ranks: Yokozuna — Ōzeki — Sekiwake — Komusubi — Maegashira

== See also ==
- Glossary of sumo terms
- List of sumo elders
- List of past sumo wrestlers
- List of sumo tournament top division champions
- List of sumo tournament top division runners-up
- List of sumo tournament second division champions
- List of yokozuna

Preceded by Futahaguro Kōji	61st Yokozuna; July 1987 – March 1992	Succeeded by Ōnokuni Yasushi
Yokozuna is not a successive rank, and more than one wrestler can hold the title at once

Sporting positions
Preceded by Kitanoumi Toshimitsu	Chairman of the Japan Sumo Association; 2015–	Succeeded by Incumbent
