= 2008 sumo cannabis scandal =

Drug scandal in professional sumo

There was a series of cannabis scandals in professional sumo beginning in August 2008. Four sekitori ranked wrestlers, Wakanohō, Rohō, Hakurozan and Wakakirin, were dismissed from professional sumo, and the chairman of the Japan Sumo Association (JSA), Kitanoumi Toshimitsu, resigned his post to take the blame. It was the first case in which active wrestlers have been dismissed from sumo. After that, the JSA added rules that any retirement package for dismissed members would be reduced or denied, and that those who use illegal drugs would be dismissed without benefits. Many Japanese news and some English news, such as BBC News and The Daily Telegraph, reported on the scandal. According to The Japan Times, it was the largest sports scandal of drugs that Japan had ever seen.

== Background ==
Since 2007, scandals and allegations about professional sumo have occasionally occurred. In February 2007, the Japanese magazine Shūkan Gendai reported allegations of yaocho (match fixing). The JSA sued the magazine for $4 million. In June 2007, a 17-years-old wrestler Takashi Saito died as a result of hazing at the Tokitsukaze stable. His stablemaster Futatsuryū and three other wrestlers were arrested in February 2008, and his coach was sentenced to six years in prison in 2009. In August 2007, Asashōryū, the yokozuna ranked Mongolian wrestler, was suspended from the next two tournaments due to faking injuries. It was the first case that yokozuna received such a punishment. On July 26, 2007 Asashōryū played in a charity soccer event in Mongolia despite having submitted a medical report about his injuries before. His injuries were regarded as having been faked in order to avoid the summer regional tour, and so the JSA decided to suspend him from the next two tournaments and cut his salary.

According to the Japan Today, the chairman of the JSA Kitanoumi was often censured seriously by the media for his irresponsible reaction in these cases.

== Scandals of four wrestlers ==
=== Wakanohō ===
On August 18, 2008, Wakanohō Toshinori was arrested for possession of cannabis. He became the first active sekitori to be arrested. In other words, it was the first case that a sumo wrestler of the top two division was arrested.

On June 24, 2008, a woman found a dropped wallet at Kinshi, Sumida, Tokyo and turned it into the police box. Police found his alien registration card and a Russian made cigarette containing 0.368 gram of dried plants including cannabis component. On August 19, police also searched the Magaki stable and his apartment, and found a pipe and a cigarette in his private room at the stable, and two pipes and a bag with a little of cannabis at the apartment. On August 21, the Japan Sumo Association (JSA) held a meeting of the board of directors and decided to dismiss him. In addition, Magaki stablemaster, who was his coach, became the first director of the JSA to resign. Tsuneo Suzuki, the Minister of Education, Culture, Sports, Science and Technology, told the JSA to swiftly appoint external directors. On August 26, he told police that he had bought the drug and pipes for 20,000 yen from two African and Russian men at a disco in Roppongi, Tokyo in June. On September 8 Wakanohō was released, and on September 12 the Tokyo District Public Prosecutors Office decided to suspend an indictment, probably because he was a minor at that time, had not been arrested before, and had only a small amount of cannabis.

On September 11, he filed a suit against the JSA for dismissing him and applied for provisional disposition, insisting that his penalty was much heavier than previous cases of misconduct in sumo. On September 29, he hold a press conference and claimed that "I was forcibly handed money to fight unfair bouts." He also insists that other wrestlers and coaches were smoking cannabis but they were not being punished. According to Doreen Simmons, a sumo commentator for NHK, it would seem that nobody expect such turn of events. Wakanohō's lawyer said that he did not know about it until the day before and he was sorry that he couldn't stop it. Simmons also said, "It looks to me as if Wakanoho has nothing to lose and is looking to get 10 million yen in damages out of the JSA."

The trial started on October 27, and on October 30 Tokyo District Court rejected his application. He made an immediate appeal against the sentence, but Tokyo High Court also dismissed it on December 9. He withdrew a suit and decided to go back to Russia in February 2009.

=== Rohō and Hakurozan ===
On September 2, 2008, the JSA published that the unannounced drug test by urinalysis for sekitori, 69 wrestlers in the sport's top two divisions, showed that Rohō Yukio and Hakurozan Yūta, brothers from Russia, were positive for cannabis. On September 8, the JSA decided to dismiss them, because the more detailed tests by Mitsubishi Chemical Medience, which has the only WADA accredited laboratory in Japan, showed that their result was much higher than WADA standard value of cannabis. Their stablemasters also lost their positions. Kitanoumi Toshimitsu, the coach of Hakurozan, resigned his post as chairman of the JSA to accept responsibility, and Ōtake stablemaster, the coach of Rohō, was demoted from the committee member to toshiyori, the lowest rank of stablemasters. Musashigawa, the former sumo wrestler of the highest rank yokozuna and the stablemaster of Musashigawa stable, replaced Kitanoumi as the JSA's chairman. On the other hand, Rohō and Hakurozan denied using cannabis, and police couldn't find any evidence during a domiciliary search.

They also filed a suit against the JSA for dismissing them, and the trial began on February 6, 2009. On April 19, 2010, the Tokyo District Court rejected their claim, and in November the Tokyo High Court also rejected it.

In addition, they claimed 100 million yen compensation for the inappropriate process of drug tests and dismiss, but Tokyo District Court also rejected it on December 10, 2010.

=== Wakakirin ===
On January 30, 2009, Wakakirin Shinichi was arrested for possession of cannabis. He was the first Japanese wrestler in these scandals.

When the JSA tested wrestlers of the top two division without prior notice on September 2, 2008, he was tested three times, and the first and second tests showed inconclusive results, but the result of the third check was negative. On January 30, 2009, when police searched the office of a CD shop in Roppongi to investigate another case, he tried to hide cannabis by wrapping it in paper. He admitted his guilt. On February 2, he was dismissed and his coach, Oguruma stablemaster, was demoted to the lowest rank toshiyori.

On April 22, 2009, Yokohama District Court gave him 10 months' imprisonment with a three years' stay of execution.

== See also ==
- 2008 in sumo
- 2009 in sumo
- Controversies in professional sumo
- Cannabis in sport
