= Wakanohō Toshinori =

Russian sumo wrestler (born 1988)

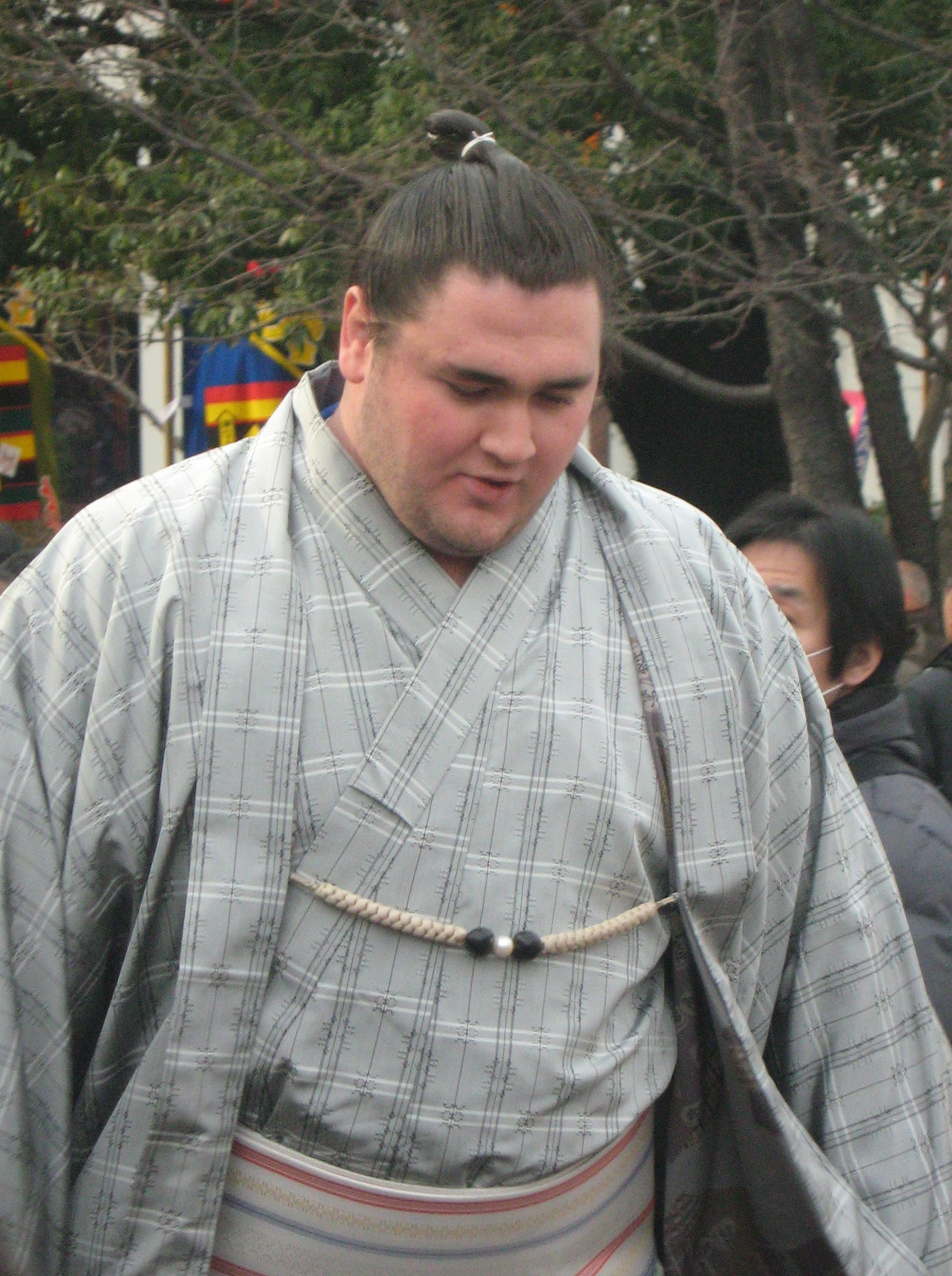

Personal information
- Native name: 若ノ鵬 寿則
- Born: Soslan Aleksandrovich Gagloev; July 8, 1988 (age 38) Alagir, North Ossetian ASSR, Soviet Union
- Height: 1.95 m (6 ft 5 in)
- Weight: 156 kg (344 lb)

Sport
- Sport: Sumo
- Retired: August, 2008
- Heya: Magaki
- Record: 131–81–0
- Debut: March 2005
- Highest rank: Maegashira 1 (July, 2008)
- Championships: 1 (Jonidan)
- Updated on August 2008

Wakanohō Toshinori (born July 8, 1988 as Soslan Aleksandrovich Gagloev (Russian: Сосла́н Алекса́ндрович Гагло́ев)) is a retired Russian sumo wrestler. His highest rank was maegashira 1. He became the first active wrestler to be dismissed from sumo, after being arrested for possession of cannabis in August 2008. He has also played college football at the University of South Florida, Webber International University, and Warner University. As of July 2014, he lives in Florida.

== Career ==
He was a freestyle wrestler in Russia, but as his weight continued to increase past the 120-kilogram (260-pound) upper limit for competitions, he switched to sumo. Having known fellow Russian sumo wrestler Rohō for many years, when he first arrived in Japan he stayed at Rohō's training stable, Ōtake-beya, for about six months to learn the basics. Due to the restrictions on foreigners, he could not join that stable, but its stablemaster Taihō had connections to the former Wakanohana Kanji II, and he joined Magaki stable instead. His shikona of Wakanohō was formed as a combination of Wakanohana II and Taihō's names.

Wakanohō made his professional debut in March 2005. He moved through the lower divisions quickly, winning the championship in the jonidan division in May 2005 with a perfect 7–0 record. It took him a year to climb up the third makushita division and in November 2006 a 4–3 record at Makushita 1 East earned him promotion to the second jūryō division and elite sekitori status. At 18 years and five months, he was the youngest foreign-born wrestler to do so. In his jūryō debut he managed only five wins against ten losses, his first-ever make-koshi, or losing score, and was demoted. However, he returned to the second division in May 2007 and three solid performances of 10–5, 8–7 and 10–5 earned him promotion to the top makuuchi division in November 2007. He was the sixth-youngest wrestler to reach makuuchi in the modern era. He came through with nine wins against six losses in his top division debut, and a 10–5 mark in January 2008 saw him move into the upper maegashira ranks for the March 2008 tournament. Fighting all the top-ranked wrestlers for the first time, he defeated ozeki Kaiō and secured his kachi-koshi, or winning record, on the final day.

During the May 2008 tournament he was reprimanded by the Japan Sumo Association after he smashed a door in the dressing room following a defeat to Harumafuji (then known as Ama) by the technique of utchari. However, he once again secured his majority of wins on the final day, his fourth straight kachi-koshi in the top division. However, in the July 2008 tournament, fighting from what was to be his highest rank of maegashira 1 he lost his first eight bouts and finished on 4–11.

Wakanoho had winning records against Kakuryu, Harumafuji, Kisenosato and Goeido, and was considered to have potential to reach ozeki, but suffered from a lack of guidance at his stable, following the death of the stablemaster's wife and Magaki himself having a stroke.

== Fighting style ==
Wakanohō favoured belt techniques and preferred a migi-yotsu (left hand outside, right hand inside) grip his opponent's mawashi. He was known for occasionally jumping straight up into the air at the tachi-ai, or initial charge, a highly unorthodox move which some commentators put down to youthful bravado. He was also criticised for relying too much on side-steps and slap-downs. Although his most common winning technique was yorikiri (force-out), the slap-down, or hatakikomi, was second and he had a much higher percentage of wins with this technique than most of his contemporaries.

== Arrest and dismissal ==
On 18 August 2008, Wakanohō was arrested for possession of cannabis. A wallet belonging to Wakanohō was found on 24 June and handed in to police. It contained a Russian made cigarette mixed with what appeared to be cannabis, and the wrestler's identification. Wakanohō said he bought two bags of marijuana, a rolled joint, a pipe and two Russian cigarettes from a Russian and a black man for 20,000 yen in a club in Roppongi. Police had also searched his apartment and private quarters at Magaki stable and recovered a small quantity of cannabis in a bag, and a pipe used to smoke the drug.

On 21 August, the Japan Sumo Association held a meeting of the board of directors and decided on the immediate dismissal of Wakanohō. It was the first time an active rikishi has been dismissed. He could have faced up to five years in prison or deportation from Japan. However, on 8 September, after eight days in police detention, he was released without punishment, as he was a minor at the time of the incident and the amount of cannabis in his possession was very small. Speaking to the press Wakanoho apologised for his actions and asked for forgiveness, but denied ever smoking with Rohō and Hakurozan, both of whom were also dismissed after failing drug tests for cannabis. He visited the Ryōgoku Kokugikan and asked to be readmitted to sumo, but the Sumo Association's directors refused his request. He responded by filing a lawsuit for unfair dismissal against the Association.

In an odd twist, Wakanoho had his kesho-mawashi, ceremonial apron, sponsored by the Japanese Drug Abuse Prevention Center.

In the banzuke of the aki basho in September 2008, the East Maegashira #8 ranking that had been scheduled to be allocated for Wakanohō was left vacant. The last time this happened was when Tokitsuumi retired in October 2007 and was left off the November 2007 banzuke.

In January 2009 Wakanoho dropped all legal action against the Sumo association and the two sides reached an amicable agreement regarding his severance pay, believed to be 5.8 million yen. He had an informal hair-cutting ceremony or danpatsu-shiki, symbolically accepting that his sumo career was at an end. It was held in an hotel in Tokyo with no other rikishi or coaches attending. On 13 February, Wakanohō returned to Russia, as his working visa had expired.

== Allegations of match-fixing ==
During a press conference on 29 September 2008 Wakanoho claimed he was forced to accept bribes to forfeit sumo matches. He said he would appear for the Shukan Gendai magazine's defence of the lawsuit brought by the Sumo Association over other match-fixing allegations. In an interview for the tabloid he claimed that ozeki Kotoōshū and jūryō wrestler Kasuganishiki had asked him to throw matches against them. Both wrestlers denied the allegations. Wakanoho also called sumo a "show" and a "circus." In another instalment for the same magazine he made similar allegations against ozeki Kaio and Chiyotaikai, who also denied the claims. In a third article he suggested that he smoked cannabis in Magaki stable with Georgian wrestler Tochinoshin, contradicting his sworn police statement that he was alone.

On 28 November he retracted these claims and apologised to those he had implicated, saying he had been told by the magazine that he would be back in the Sumo Association "in one week" if he made the allegations. He said the Shukan Gendai made up the story and cited the names of the four wrestlers, for which he received 2.5 million yen in cash. The magazine responded by saying his retraction "(did) not make any sense and cannot be thought of as true."

In February 2011, following a match-fixing scandal involving Kasuganishiki, Chiyohakuho and a number of other juryo wrestlers, the former Wakanoho changed his position once again, and said he had been involved in yaocho after all. He explained that the reason that he denied his original yaocho claims was because the Japan Sumo Association promised to pay him retirement money if he did, and that they later reneged on this agreement (the Sumo Association has denied any such agreement ever taking place). He also named 21 other wrestlers against whom he performed yaocho in the February 21, 2011 edition of Shukan Gendai magazine.

== Post-sumo career ==
In 2010, Gagloev began playing college football for Webber International University, a National Association of Intercollegiate Athletics (NAIA) school in Florida. He later transferred to the top-level program at the University of South Florida (USF) as a walk-on in 2012 and sat out a year due to NCAA transfer rules. However, after USF suffered a three-win season, the entire coaching staff was replaced by a new staff who chose to cut Gagloev from the team. After USF, he received a scholarship from Warner University, another NAIA school in Florida where he switched to offensive line. The next year, he decided to forgo his final year of eligibility at Warner to pursue the NFL.

During this time Gagloev's first marriage ended and former wife returned to her home in Russia with their daughter; he has since remarried Dakota Polkowska Springfields, an American, on May 22, 2014 in St. Pete Beach, FL.

He took part in the 2014 US Sumo Open held in Long Beach, California, but lost out to the eventual winner Byambajav Ulambayar. He has appeared in exhibition sumo events with other ex professional sumo wrestlers across the US, and was due to take part in the "Ultimate Sumo League" in Las Vegas in April 2018, although the event was postponed.

== Career record ==
Wakanohō Toshinori
Year	January Hatsu basho, Tokyo	March Haru basho, Osaka	May Natsu basho, Tokyo	July Nagoya basho, Nagoya	September Aki basho, Tokyo	November Kyūshū basho, Fukuoka
2005	x	(Maezumo)	East Jonokuchi #18; 6–1	West Jonidan #64; 5–2	West Jonidan #26; 7–0–P; Champion	East Sandanme #30; 6–1
2006	West Makushita #49; 6–1–PP	West Makushita #21; 5–2	West Makushita #12; 5–2	East Makushita #7; 4–3	East Makushita #6; 6–1	East Makushita #1; 4–3
2007	West Jūryō #12; 5–10	East Makushita #2; 5–2	East Jūryō #13; 10–5	East Jūryō #4; 8–7	West Jūryō #1; 10–5	West Maegashira #13; 9–6
2008	East Maegashira #10; 10–5	East Maegashira #4; 8–7	West Maegashira #2; 8–7	West Maegashira #1; 4–11	Dismissed	x
Record given as wins–losses–absences Top division champion Top division runner-up Retired Lower divisions Non-participation Sanshō key: F=Fighting spirit; O=Outstanding performance; T=Technique Also shown: ★=Kinboshi; P=Playoff(s); Divisions: Makuuchi — Jūryō — Makushita — Sandanme — Jonidan — Jonokuchi Makuuchi ranks: Yokozuna — Ōzeki — Sekiwake — Komusubi — Maegashira

== See also ==
- Match-fixing in professional sumo
- Glossary of sumo terms
- List of non-Japanese sumo wrestlers
- List of past sumo wrestlers
