= Chiyohakuhō Daiki =

Japanese sumo wrestler

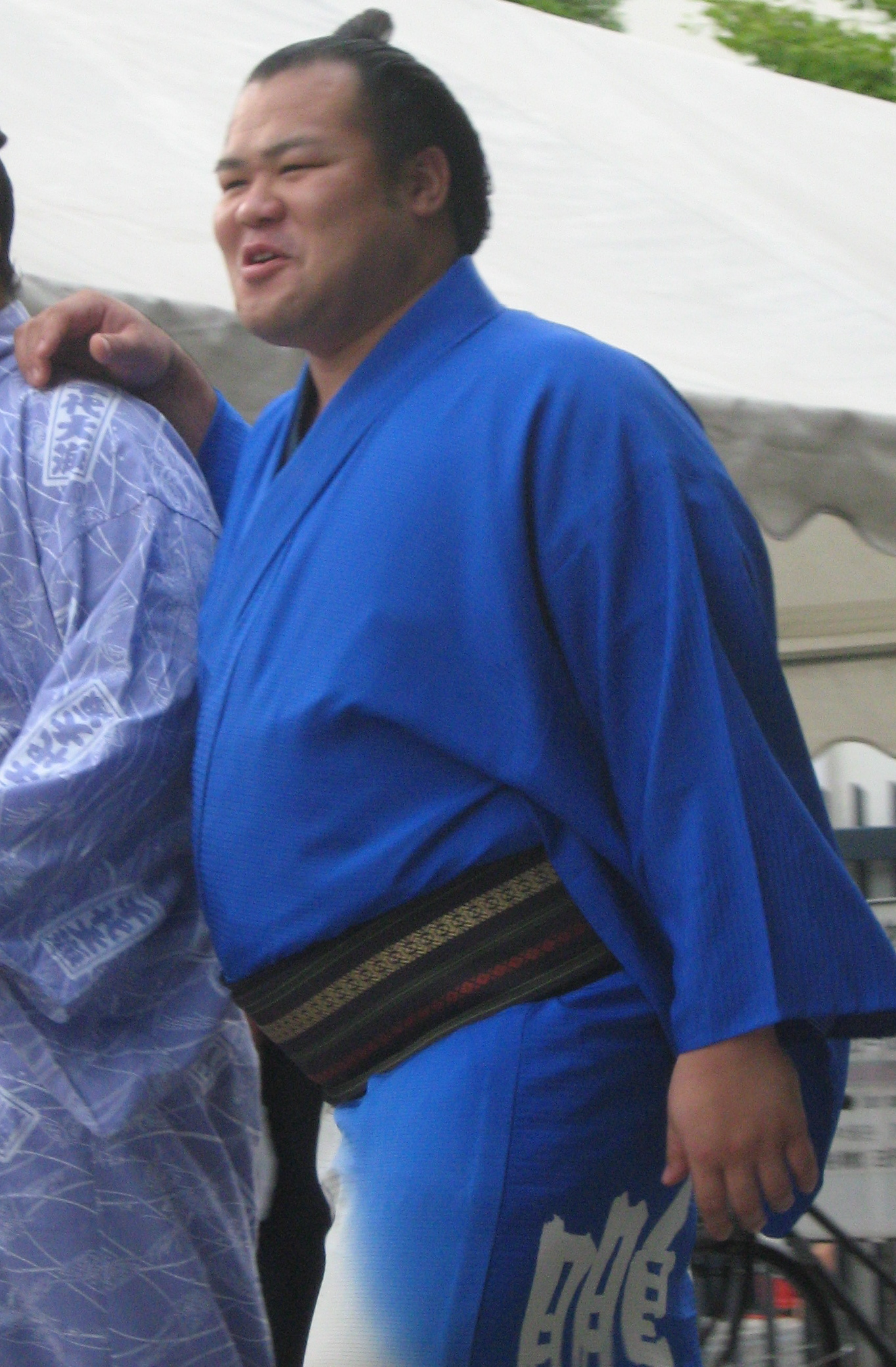

Personal information
- Native name: 千代白鵬 大樹
- Born: Daiki Kakiuchi; 21 April 1983 (age 43) Yamaga, Kumamoto, Japan
- Height: 1.80 m (5 ft 11 in)
- Weight: 135 kg (298 lb; 21.3 st)

Sport
- Sport: Sumo
- Retired: April 2011
- Heya: Kokonoe
- Record: 343-296-50
- Debut: March, 1999
- Highest rank: Maegashira 6 (May, 2009)
- Championships: 1 (Makushita); 1 (Jūryō)
- Updated on Jan 2011

Chiyohakuhō Daiki (born 21 April 1983 as Daiki Kakiuchi) is a former sumo wrestler from Yamaga, Kumamoto, Japan. He made his professional debut in 1999 and broke into the top makuuchi division nine years later in 2008. His highest rank was maegashira 6. He wrestled for Kokonoe stable. After he admitted to his involvement in match-fixing, he retired from the sport in 2011 following an investigation by the Japan Sumo Association.

== Career ==
At high school he preferred judo, and had little sumo experience, but his judo teacher was a friend of Kokonoe-oyakata, the 58th yokozuna Chiyonofuji. After being introduced he joined Kokonoe stable, making his professional debut in March 1999. His stablemate, Chiyotaikai, made his debut at the rank of ōzeki in the same tournament. He initially fought under his own surname, before adopting the shikona of Chiyohakuhō in November 1999. (He has no connection to the better known wrestler Hakuhō, who did not make his debut until March 2001.) He was first promoted to the third highest makushita division in November 2001.

Chiyohakuhō slowly climbed the makushita division and upon taking his first tournament championship in January 2005 with a perfect 7–0 record from the rank of makushita 4 he earned automatic promotion to the elite sekitori ranks. However, he had to pull out of his debut tournament in the second highest jūryō division with an injury and fell back to makushita. He did not re-establish himself as a sekitori wrestler until May 2007. After six unremarkable tournaments he took the jūryō division championship with a 13–2 record in May 2008, and this was just enough to earn him promotion to the top makuuchi division at the lowest rank of maegashira 16.

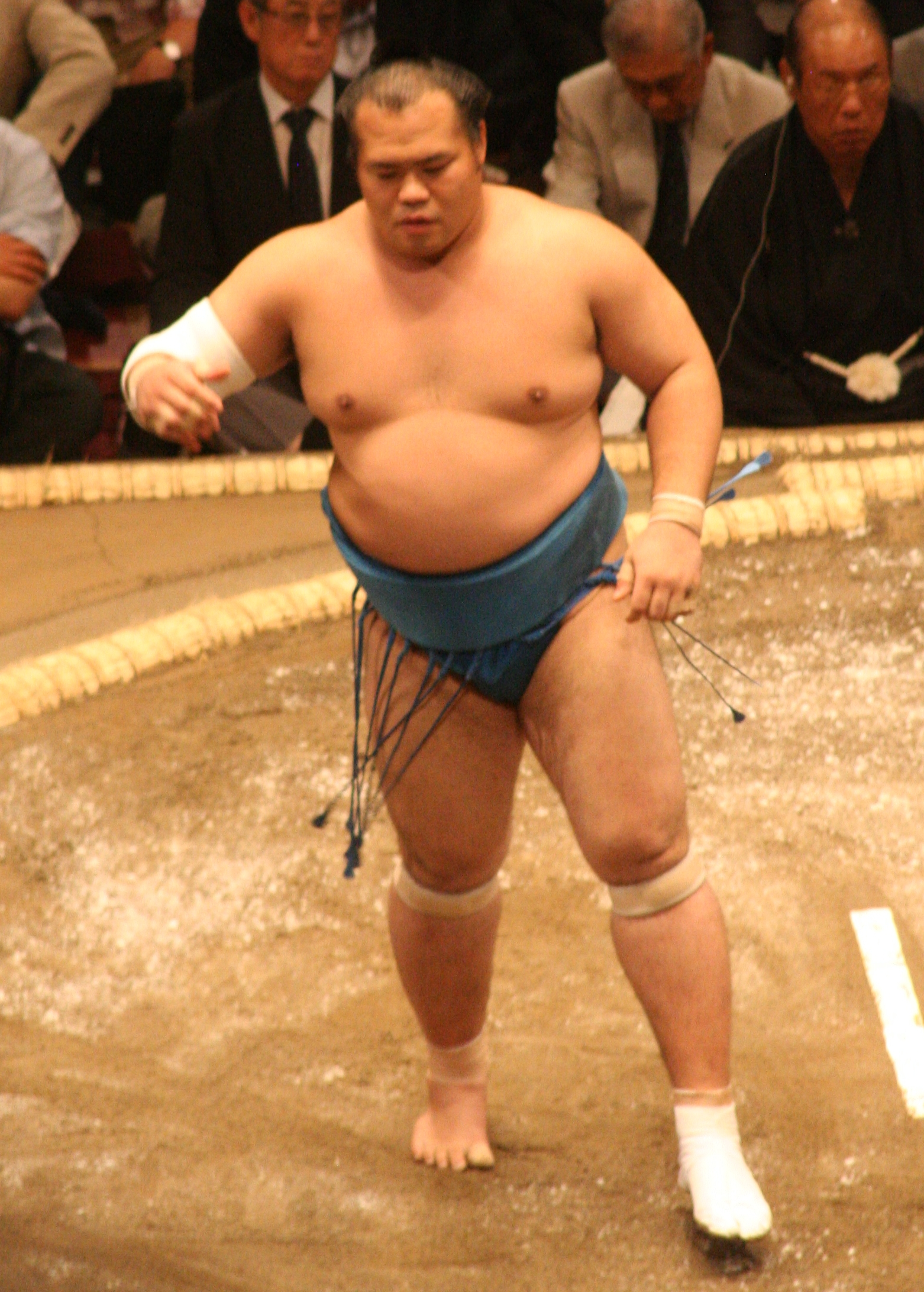
Chiyohakuhō in May 2009

Chiyohakuhō came through with a bare majority of eight wins against seven losses in his top division debut in July 2008. He could only manage six wins in the next tournament but remained in the division, and a score of 9–6 in November pushed him up to maegashira 9 for the January 2009 tournament. He recorded six wins against nine losses there. Falling to maegashira 13, he produced a strong 10–5 record in March, which sent him up to what was to be his highest rank of maegashira 6.

He made a good start to the May 2009 tournament but was forced to pull out after damaging knee ligaments in his Day 4 defeat to Kisenosato. He was demoted back to the jūryō division for July 2009 as a result. He was unable to secure an immediate return to the top division, scoring only 7–8 in the July tournament. In September 2009 he withdrew once again after winning only three bouts in the first ten days, and he remained in jūryō after that.

== Controversy ==
In September 2008 Chiyohakuhō was the only wrestler who did not take part in the surprise drug tests of the seventy sekitori that led to the dismissals of Rohō and Hakurozan. In June 2009, along with other members of the Kokonoe stable and four other sables, he was tested, and he expressed his relief at finally having done so.

He was suspended along with over a dozen other wrestlers from the July 2010 tournament after admitting involvement in illegal betting on baseball. As a result, he fell to the makushita division in September. This also left Kokonoe stable without any sekitori. However, he scored 6-1 from the rank of makushita 5, enough for an immediate return to jūryō.

In February 2011, Chiyohakuhō reportedly admitted to fixing or throwing bouts in which he was involved in advance, after police investigating the baseball affair found text messages on his mobile phone apparently arranging the outcome of matches and discussing payments. On February 4, he tendered his resignation to the Japan Sumo Association. However, no decision on his future was made until an investigation into the affair by an independent panel concluded on April 1, when the Sumo Association announced the "advised retirements" of 21 wrestlers and two coaches. Because he admitted his involvement Chiyohakuhō was given a two-year suspension instead, along with coach Takenawa (former maegashira Kasuganishiki) and suspected go-between Enatsukasa. However, his letter of resignation was accepted. Chiyohakuho gave a public apology, saying "I'm very sorry for causing trouble to the JSA and sumo fans."

== Fighting style ==
Like his stablemate Chiyotaikai, Chiyohakuhō favoured pushing and thrusting techniques, as opposed to grabbing the opponent's mawashi. His most common winning techniques were oshidashi, the push-out, hatakikomi, the slap down, and tsukiotoshi, the thrust over.

== Career record ==
Chiyohakuhō Daiki
Year	January Hatsu basho, Tokyo	March Haru basho, Osaka	May Natsu basho, Tokyo	July Nagoya basho, Nagoya	September Aki basho, Tokyo	November Kyūshū basho, Fukuoka
1999	x	(Maezumo)	East Jonokuchi #17; 5–2	East Jonidan #138; 4–3	West Jonidan #109; 7–0–P	East Sandanme #90; 5–2
2000	West Sandanme #55; 3–4	East Sandanme #72; 4–3	West Sandanme #54; 2–5	West Sandanme #78; 2–5	East Jonidan #2; 6–1	West Sandanme #40; 4–3
2001	East Sandanme #27; 2–5	West Sandanme #48; 4–3	West Sandanme #32; 3–4	West Sandanme #43; 4–3	East Sandanme #29; 6–1	East Makushita #47; 4–3
2002	East Makushita #39; 5–2	East Makushita #28; 2–5	West Makushita #46; 5–2	East Makushita #27; 2–5	East Makushita #45; 4–3	West Makushita #35; 3–4
2003	East Makushita #44; 4–1–2	East Makushita #36; Sat out due to injury 0–0–7	East Makushita #36; 6–1	West Makushita #12; 0–7	West Makushita #47; 4–3	East Makushita #40; 5–2
2004	West Makushita #21; 5–2	West Makushita #10; 4–3	East Makushita #8; 3–4	East Makushita #11; 5–2	East Makushita #5; 3–4	East Makushita #8; 4–3
2005	East Makushita #4; 7–0; Champion	West Jūryō #9; 3–8–4	East Makushita #2; 4–3	East Jūryō #14; 6–9	West Makushita #2; 2–5	East Makushita #11; 4–3
2006	West Makushita #7; 2–5	East Makushita #17; Sat out due to injury 0–0–7	West Makushita #57; 5–1–1	East Makushita #37; 5–2	West Makushita #22; 4–3	West Makushita #15; 6–1
2007	East Makushita #3; 4–3	West Makushita #1; 4–3	East Jūryō #14; 7–8	West Jūryō #14; 9–6	East Jūryō #8; 9–6	East Jūryō #5; 8–7
2008	East Jūryō #2; 5–10	East Jūryō #6; 5–10	East Jūryō #11; 13–2; Champion	West Maegashira #16; 8–7	East Maegashira #13; 6–9	West Maegashira #16; 9–6
2009	West Maegashira #9; 6–9	East Maegashira #13; 10–5	West Maegashira #6; 2–3–10	East Jūryō #1; 7–8	East Jūryō #3; 3–8–4	East Jūryō #12; 9–6
2010	West Jūryō #7; 7–8	West Jūryō #8; 9–6	West Jūryō #3; 6–9	West Jūryō #6; Suspended; 0–0–15	West Makushita #5; 6–1	East Jūryō #12; 7–8
2011	East Jūryō #13; 7–8	Tournament Cancelled; 0–0–0	East Jūryō #14; Retired –	x	x	x
Record given as wins–losses–absences Top division champion Top division runner-up Retired Lower divisions Non-participation Sanshō key: F=Fighting spirit; O=Outstanding performance; T=Technique Also shown: ★=Kinboshi; P=Playoff(s); Divisions: Makuuchi — Jūryō — Makushita — Sandanme — Jonidan — Jonokuchi Makuuchi ranks: Yokozuna — Ōzeki — Sekiwake — Komusubi — Maegashira

== See also ==
- List of sumo tournament second division champions
- Glossary of sumo terms
- List of past sumo wrestlers
