= 2008 in sumo =

The following are the events in professional sumo during the year 2008.

== Tournaments ==
=== Hatsu basho ===
Ryogoku Kokugikan, Tokyo, 13 January – 27 January

2008 Hatsu basho results - Makuuchi Division
W		L		A	East			Rank	West			W		L		A
14	-	1	-	0		(Mongolia)	**Hakuhō**	Y		(Mongolia)	**Asashōryū**	13	-	2	-	0
0	-	8	-	7	ø	(Japan)	Chiyotaikai	O		(Japan)	**Kotomitsuki**	8	-	7	-	0
8	-	7	-	0		(Japan)	**Kaiō**	O		(Bulgaria)	**Kotoōshū**	9	-	6	-	0
5	-	10	-	0		(Japan)	Aminishiki	S		(Mongolia)	**Ama**	9	-	6	-	0
9	-	4	-	2		(Japan)	**Kotoshōgiku**	K		(Japan)	Dejima	3	-	12	-	0
10	-	5	-	0		(Japan)	**Kisenosato**	M1		(Mongolia)	Tokitenkū	6	-	9	-	0
6	-	9	-	0		(Japan)	Toyonoshima	M2		(Japan)	Miyabiyama	7	-	8	-	0
5	-	10	-	0		(Japan)	Gōeidō	M3		(Japan)	Tochinonada	5	-	10	-	0
7	-	8	-	0		(Japan)	Wakanosato	M4		(Mongolia)	**Asasekiryū**	10	-	5	-	0
7	-	8	-	0		(Russia)	Rohō	M5		(Japan)	Tamakasuga	4	-	11	-	0
7	-	8	-	0		(Estonia)	Baruto	M6		(Japan)	Hokutōriki	7	-	8	-	0
12	-	3	-	0		(Japan)	**Takekaze**	M7		(Japan)	Hōmashō	4	-	11	-	0
11	-	4	-	0		(Mongolia)	**Kakuryū**	M8		(Japan)	Toyohibiki	6	-	9	-	0
9	-	6	-	0		(Georgia (country))	Kokkai	M9		(Japan)	Wakakirin	4	-	11	-	0
10	-	5	-	0		(Russia)	**Wakanohō**	M10		(Mongolia)	**Kyokutenhō**	10	-	5	-	0
6	-	9	-	0		(Japan)	Kakizoe	M11		(South Korea)	**Kasugaō**	8	-	7	-	0
8	-	7	-	0		(Japan)	**Futen'ō**	M12		(Japan)	Tosanoumi	5	-	10	-	0
9	-	6	-	0		(Japan)	**Iwakiyama**	M13		(Japan)	Tamanoshima	3	-	12	-	0
8	-	7	-	0		(Japan)	**Takamisakari**	M14	ø	(Japan)	Shimootori	1	-	1	-	13
8	-	7	-	0		(Japan)	**Tochiōzan**	M15		(Japan)	Yoshikaze	8	-	7	-	0
8	-	7	-	0		(Japan)	**Ichihara**	M16		(Japan)	Kaihō	8	-	7	-	0

ø - Indicates a pull-out or absent rank
**winning record in bold**
**Yusho Winner**

=== Haru basho ===
Osaka Prefectural Gymnasium, Osaka, 9 March – 23 March

2008 Haru basho results - Makuuchi Division
W		L		A	East			Rank	West			W		L		A
12	-	3	-	0		(Mongolia)	**Hakuhō**	Y		(Mongolia)	**Asashōryū**	13	-	2	-	0
2	-	7	-	6	ø	(Bulgaria)	Kotoōshū	O		(Japan)	**Kotomitsuki**	8	-	7	-	0
8	-	7	-	0		(Japan)	**Kaiō**	O		(Japan)	**Chiyotaikai**	8	-	7	-	0
8	-	7	-	0		(Mongolia)	**Ama**	S		(Japan)	**Kotoshōgiku**	8	-	7	-	0
8	-	7	-	0		(Japan)	**Kisenosato**	K		(Japan)	Takekaze	3	-	12	-	0
8	-	7	-	0		(Mongolia)	**Asasekiryū**	M1		(Mongolia)	Kakuryū	6	-	9	-	0
6	-	9	-	0		(Japan)	Aminishiki	M2		(Japan)	Miyabiyama	7	-	8	-	0
7	-	8	-	0		(Mongolia)	Tokitenkū	M3		(Japan)	Toyonoshima	6	-	9	-	0
8	-	7	-	0		(Russia)	**Wakanohō**	M4		(Mongolia)	**Kyokutenhō**	9	-	6	-	0
5	-	10	-	0		(Japan)	Wakanosato	M5		(Georgia (country))	**Kokkai**	12	-	3	-	0
6	-	9	-	0		(Russia)	Rohō	M6		(Japan)	Dejima	6	-	9	-	0
12	-	3	-	0		(Estonia)	**Baruto**	M7		(Japan)	**Hokutōriki**	8	-	7	-	0
8	-	7	-	0		(Japan)	**Gōeidō**	M8		(Japan)	**Tochinonada**	8	-	7	-	0
7	-	8	-	0		(Japan)	Iwakiyama	M9		(South Korea)	**Kasugaō**	8	-	7	-	0
10	-	5	-	0		(Japan)	**Futen'ō**	M10		(Japan)	Tamakasuga	6	-	9	-	0
5	-	10	-	0		(Japan)	Toyohibiki	M11		(Japan)	**Takamisakari**	10	-	5	-	0
11	-	4	-	0		(Japan)	**Tochiōzan**	M12		(Japan)	Yoshikaze	6	-	9	-	0
9	-	6	-	0		(Japan)	**Hōmashō**	M13	ø	(Japan)	Ichihara	0	-	2	-	13
4	-	11	-	0		(Japan)	Kaihō	M14		(Japan)	**Kakizoe**	8	-	7	-	0
6	-	9	-	0		(Japan)	Wakakirin	M15	ø	(Japan)	Sakaizawa	3	-	5	-	7
5	-	10	-	0		(Japan)	Ōtsukasa	M16		(Mongolia)	Ryūō	5	-	10	-	0

ø - Indicates a pull-out or absent rank
**winning record in bold**
**Yusho Winner**

=== Natsu basho ===
Ryogoku Kokugikan, Tokyo, 11 May – 25 May

2008 Natsu basho results - Makuuchi Division
W		L		A	East			Rank	West			W		L		A
11	-	4	-	0		(Mongolia)	**Asashōryū**	Y		(Mongolia)	**Hakuhō**	11	-	4	-	0
8	-	7	-	0		(Japan)	**Kotomitsuki**	O		(Japan)	**Kaiō**	8	-	7	-	0
5	-	10	-	0		(Japan)	Chiyotaikai	O		(Bulgaria)	**Kotoōshū**	14	-	1	-	0
9	-	6	-	0		(Mongolia)	**Ama**	S		(Japan)	**Kotoshōgiku**	8	-	7	-	0
10	-	5	-	0		(Japan)	**Kisenosato**	K		(Mongolia)	Asasekiryū	6	-	9	-	0
3	-	12	-	0		(Georgia (country))	Kokkai	M1		(Estonia)	Baruto	5	-	10	-	0
4	-	11	-	0		(Mongolia)	Kyokutenhō	M2		(Russia)	**Wakanohō**	8	-	7	-	0
6	-	9	-	0		(Japan)	Miyabiyama	M3		(Mongolia)	Kakuryū	5	-	10	-	0
6	-	9	-	0		(Mongolia)	Tokitenkū	M4		(Japan)	**Aminishiki**	10	-	5	-	0
5	-	10	-	0		(Japan)	Tochiōzan	M5		(Japan)	**Toyonoshima**	11	-	4	-	0
9	-	6	-	0		(Japan)	**Futen'ō**	M6		(Japan)	**Hokutōriki**	10	-	5	-	0
7	-	8	-	0		(Japan)	Takamisakari	M7		(Japan)	**Gōeidō**	8	-	7	-	0
9	-	6	-	0		(Japan)	**Tochinonada**	M8		(Japan)	Takekaze	6	-	9	-	0
3	-	6	-	6	ø	(South Korea)	Kasugaō	M9	ø	(Russia)	**Rohō**	8	-	6	-	1
8	-	7	-	0		(Japan)	**Dejima**	M10		(Japan)	**Wakanosato**	10	-	5	-	0
8	-	7	-	0		(Japan)	**Iwakiyama**	M11		(Japan)	**Hōmashō**	9	-	6	-	0
6	-	9	-	0		(Japan)	Tosanoumi	M12		(Japan)	**Tamakasuga**	8	-	7	-	0
6	-	9	-	0		(Japan)	Kakizoe	M13		(Japan)	**Tamanoshima**	9	-	6	-	0
7	-	8	-	0		(Georgia (country))	Tochinoshin	M14		(Japan)	Yoshikaze	7	-	8	-	0
4	-	11	-	0		(Russia)	Hakurozan	M15		(Japan)	**Toyohibiki**	8	-	7	-	0
4	-	11	-	0		(Japan)	Kotokasuga	M16		(Mongolia)	Hakuba	4	-	11	-	0

ø - Indicates a pull-out or absent rank
**winning record in bold**
**Yusho Winner**

=== Nagoya basho ===
Aichi Prefectural Gymnasium, Nagoya, 13 July – 27 July

2008 Nagoya basho results - Makuuchi Division
W		L		A	East			Rank	West		W		L		A
3	-	3	-	9	ø	(Mongolia)	Asashōryū	Y	(Mongolia)	**Hakuhō**	15	-	0	-	0
9	-	6	-	0		(Bulgaria)	**Kotoōshū**	O	(Japan)	**Kotomitsuki**	11	-	4	-	0
9	-	6	-	0		(Japan)	**Kaiō**	O	(Japan)	**Chiyotaikai**	9	-	6	-	0
10	-	5	-	0		(Mongolia)	**Ama**	S	(Japan)	Kotoshōgiku	6	-	9	-	0
6	-	9	-	0		(Japan)	Kisenosato	K	(Japan)	**Toyonoshima**	10	-	5	-	0
6	-	9	-	0		(Japan)	Aminishiki	M1	(Russia)	Wakanohō	4	-	11	-	0
8	-	7	-	0		(Mongolia)	**Asasekiryū**	M2	(Japan)	Hokutōriki	4	-	11	-	0
3	-	12	-	0		(Japan)	Futen'ō	M3	(Japan)	Tochinonada	7	-	8	-	0
5	-	10	-	0		(Japan)	Wakanosato	M4	(Japan)	Gōeidō	7	-	8	-	0
9	-	6	-	0		(Japan)	**Miyabiyama**	M5	(Estonia)	**Baruto**	10	-	5	-	0
9	-	6	-	0		(Japan)	**Hōmashō**	M6	(Mongolia)	Tokitenkū	7	-	8	-	0
9	-	6	-	0		(Russia)	**Rohō**	M7	(Mongolia)	**Kakuryū**	8	-	7	-	0
6	-	9	-	0		(Japan)	Takamisakari	M8	(Japan)	Dejima	6	-	9	-	0
10	-	5	-	0		(Mongolia)	**Kyokutenhō**	M9	(Japan)	**Iwakiyama**	8	-	7	-	0
7	-	8	-	0		(Japan)	Tamanoshima	M10	(Georgia (country))	Kokkai	5	-	10	-	0
9	-	6	-	0		(Japan)	**Tochiōzan**	M11	(Japan)	Tamakasuga	3	-	12	-	0
7	-	8	-	0		(Japan)	Takekaze	M12	(Japan)	Kimurayama	7	-	8	-	0
10	-	5	-	0		(Japan)	**Toyohibiki**	M13	(Mongolia)	Kōryū	3	-	12	-	0
5	-	10	-	0		(Japan)	Tosanoumi	M14	(Georgia (country))	**Tochinoshin**	8	-	7	-	0
8	-	7	-	0		(Japan)	**Yoshikaze**	M15	(Japan)	Kakizoe	7	-	8	-	0
10	-	5	-	0		(Japan)	**Masatsukasa**	M16	(Japan)	**Chiyohakuhō**	8	-	7	-	0

ø - Indicates a pull-out or absent rank
**winning record in bold**
**Yusho Winner**

=== Aki basho ===
Ryogoku Kokugikan, Tokyo, 14 September – 28 September

2008 Aki basho results - Makuuchi Division
W		L		A	East			Rank	West			W		L		A
14	-	1	-	0		(Mongolia)	**Hakuhō**	Y	ø	(Mongolia)	Asashōryū	5	-	5	-	5
11	-	4	-	0		(Japan)	**Kotomitsuki**	O		(Bulgaria)	**Kotoōshū**	8	-	7	-	0
9	-	6	-	0		(Japan)	**Kaiō**	O		(Japan)	**Chiyotaikai**	9	-	6	-	0
12	-	3	-	0		(Mongolia)	**Ama**	S		(Japan)	Toyonoshima	6	-	9	-	0
8	-	7	-	0		(Estonia)	**Baruto**	K		(Mongolia)	Asasekiryū	4	-	11	-	0
6	-	9	-	0		(Japan)	Kotoshōgiku	M1		(Japan)	Miyabiyama	4	-	11	-	0
6	-	9	-	0		(Japan)	Kisenosato	M2	ø	(Japan)	Hōmashō	0	-	0	-	15
6	-	9	-	0		(Mongolia)	Kyokutenhō	M3	ø	(Russia)	Rohō	0	-	0	-	0
8	-	7	-	0		(Japan)	**Aminishiki**	M4		(Japan)	Tochinonada	6	-	9	-	0
7	-	8	-	0		(Mongolia)	Kakuryū	M5		(Japan)	**Gōeidō**	10	-	5	-	0
8	-	7	-	0		(Japan)	**Toyohibiki**	M6		(Japan)	Tochiōzan	6	-	9	-	0
1	-	2	-	12	ø	(Japan)	Iwakiyama	M7		(Mongolia)	Tokitenkū	6	-	9	-	0
					ø			M8		(Japan)	Masatsukasa	5	-	10	-	0
8	-	7	-	0		(Japan)	**Hokutōriki**	M9		(Japan)	**Wakanosato**	9	-	6	-	0
8	-	7	-	0		(Georgia (country))	**Tochinoshin**	M10		(Japan)	**Futen'ō**	11	-	4	-	0
7	-	8	-	0		(Japan)	Yoshikaze	M11		(Japan)	Takamisakari	6	-	9	-	0
7	-	8	-	0		(Japan)	Tamanoshima	M12		(Japan)	**Dejima**	9	-	6	-	0
6	-	9	-	0		(Japan)	Chiyohakuhō	M13		(Japan)	Kitataiki	7	-	8	-	0
9	-	6	-	0		(Japan)	**Takekaze**	M14		(Japan)	Kimurayama	7	-	8	-	0
4	-	11	-	0		(Mongolia)	Tamawashi	M15		(South Korea)	Kasugaō	2	-	13	-	0
8	-	7	-	0		(Georgia (country))	**Kokkai**	M16		(Japan)	**Kakizoe**	10	-	5	-	0

ø - Indicates a pull-out or absent rank
**winning record in bold**
**Yusho Winner**

=== Kyushu basho ===
Fukuoka International Centre, Kyushu, 9 November – 23 November

2008 Kyushu basho results - Makuuchi Division
W		L		A	East			Rank	West			W		L		A
13	-	2	-	0		(Mongolia)	**Hakuhō***	Y	ø	(Mongolia)	Asashōryū	0	-	0	-	15
9	-	6	-	0		(Japan)	**Kotomitsuki**	O	ø	(Japan)	Kaiō	1	-	3	-	11
8	-	7	-	0		(Japan)	**Chiyotaikai**	O		(Bulgaria)	**Kotoōshū**	8	-	7	-	0
13	-	2	-	0		(Mongolia)	**Ama**	S		(Estonia)	**Baruto**	9	-	6	-	0
5	-	10	-	0		(Japan)	Gōeidō	K		(Japan)	**Aminishiki**	8	-	7	-	0
9	-	6	-	0		(Japan)	**Toyonoshima**	M1		(Japan)	Futen'ō	5	-	10	-	0
0	-	0	-	15	ø	(Japan)	Toyohibiki	M2		(Japan)	Wakanosato	6	-	9	-	0
9	-	6	-	0		(Japan)	**Kotoshōgiku**	M3		(Japan)	Hokutōriki	5	-	10	-	0
11	-	4	-	0		(Japan)	**Kisenosato**	M4		(Georgia (country))	Tochinoshin	3	-	12	-	0
5	-	10	-	0		(Mongolia)	Asasekiryū	M5		(Japan)	Dejima	6	-	9	-	0
5	-	6	-	4	ø	(Mongolia)	Kakuryū	M6		(Mongolia)	**Kyokutenhō**	10	-	5	-	0
10	-	5	-	0		(Japan)	**Miyabiyama**	M7		(Japan)	Tochinonada	5	-	10	-	0
9	-	6	-	0		(Japan)	**Takekaze**	M8		(Japan)	Kakizoe	5	-	10	-	0
6	-	9	-	0		(Japan)	Tochiōzan	M9		(Mongolia)	Tokitenkū	7	-	8	-	0
8	-	7	-	0		(Japan)	**Bushūyama**	M10		(Russia)	**Aran**	8	-	7	-	0
9	-	6	-	0		(Georgia (country))	**Kokkai**	M11		(Mongolia)	Kōryū	6	-	9	-	0
11	-	4	-	0		(Japan)	**Yoshikaze**	M12	ø	(Japan)	Kasuganishiki	2	-	3	-	10
6	-	9	-	0		(Japan)	Masatsukasa	M13		(Japan)	Tamanoshima	6	-	9	-	0
10	-	5	-	0		(Japan)	**Takamisakari**	M14		(Japan)	Kitataiki	2	-	13	-	0
6	-	9	-	0		(Japan)	Kimurayama	M15		(Japan)	Hōmashō	7	-	8	-	0
9	-	6	-	0		(Japan)	**Tosanoumi**	M16		(Japan)	**Chiyohakuhō**	9	-	6	-	0

ø - Indicates a pull-out or absent rank
**winning record in bold**
**Yusho Winner**
***Won Playoff**

== News ==
=== January ===
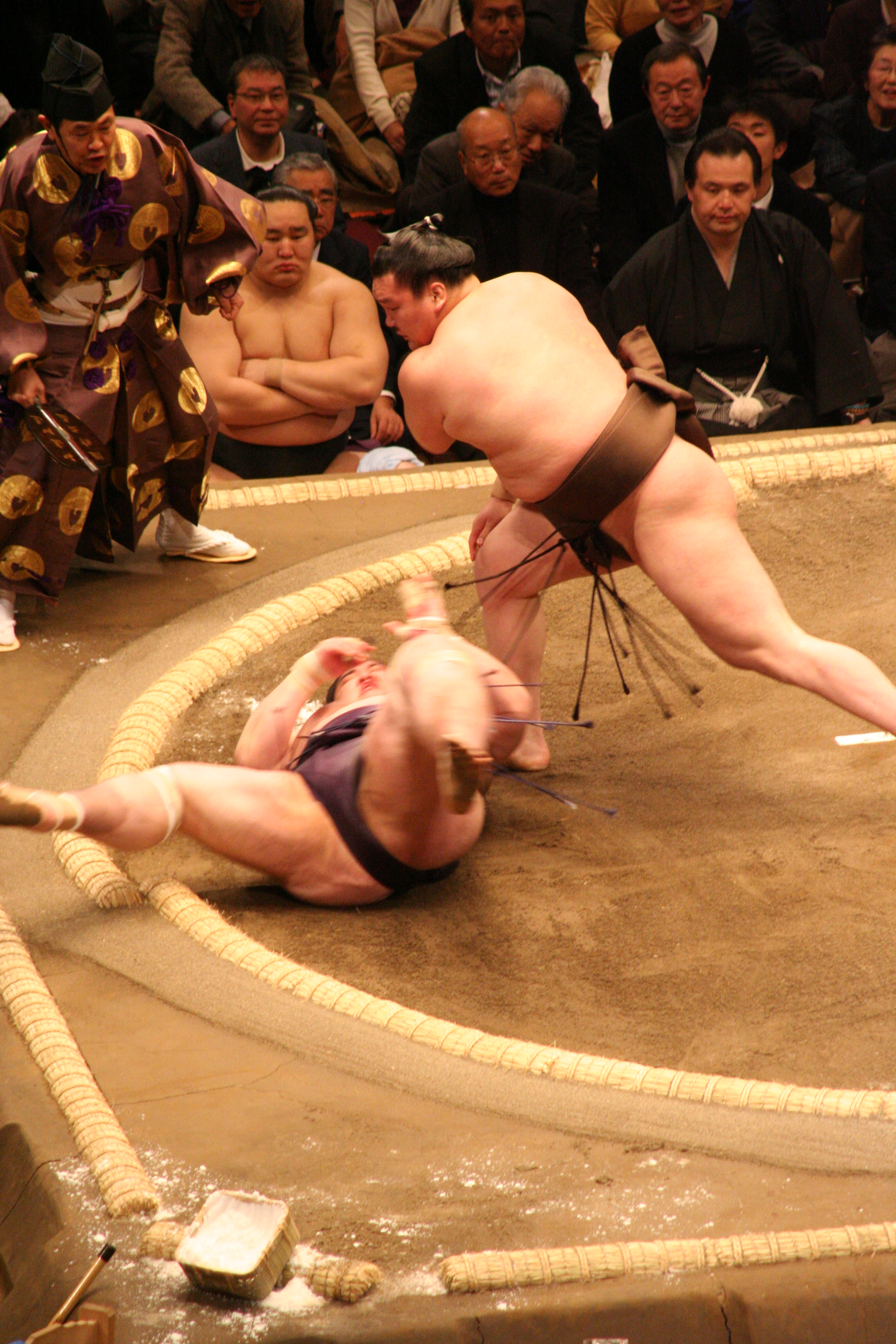
Hakuho on the opening day of the January tournament

- 27th: Yokozuna Asashoryu, making his return from a two tournament suspension, enters the final day of the Hatsu basho in Tokyo in the joint lead for the championship, but is defeated by fellow yokozuna Hakuho, who wins his sixth top division yusho with a 14–1 record. Asashoryu finishes on 13–2 with runner-up honours. Another Mongolian, Kakuryu, wins 11 matches and receives the Technique Award. Rank-and-filer Takekaze scores 12–3 and wins the Fighting Spirit Award, and Kisenosato scores 10–5 and receives the Outstanding Performance Award for his victory over Asashoryu on the 2nd day. Georgian Tochinoshin, making his debut in the second highest juryo division, wins the yusho with a 12–3 record. Yamamotoyama takes the makushita division championship with a perfect 7–0 record. Announcing their retirements from active competition are former top division wrestlers Tochinohana, Tochisakae, Kobo and Chiyotenzan, as well as Kyokutenho's brother Fudoyama and Tamanoshima's brother Tamamitsukuni.

=== February ===
- 2nd: The danpatsu-shiki or retirement ceremony of former ozeki Tochiazuma takes place at a packed Kokugikan.
- 7th: The former head of the Tokitsukaze stable, Junichi Yamamoto, and three non sekitori wrestlers from the stable are arrested on charges of assault leading to the death of trainee Tokitaizan. The Aichi Prefecture Police Department allege that on 25 June 2007, the night before his death, Tokitaizan was struck on the head with a beer bottle and then tied to a pole and beaten with a wooden stick, on the orders of Yamamoto. The following day Tokitaizan was forced into an intense 30 minute training session and repeatedly hit in the face, kicked and beaten with an aluminium bat, resulting in his collapse and death.
- 10th: Asashoryu wins a one-day tournament held at the Ryogoku Kokugikan, defeating Miyabiyama, Asasekiryu and Tokitenku.

=== March ===
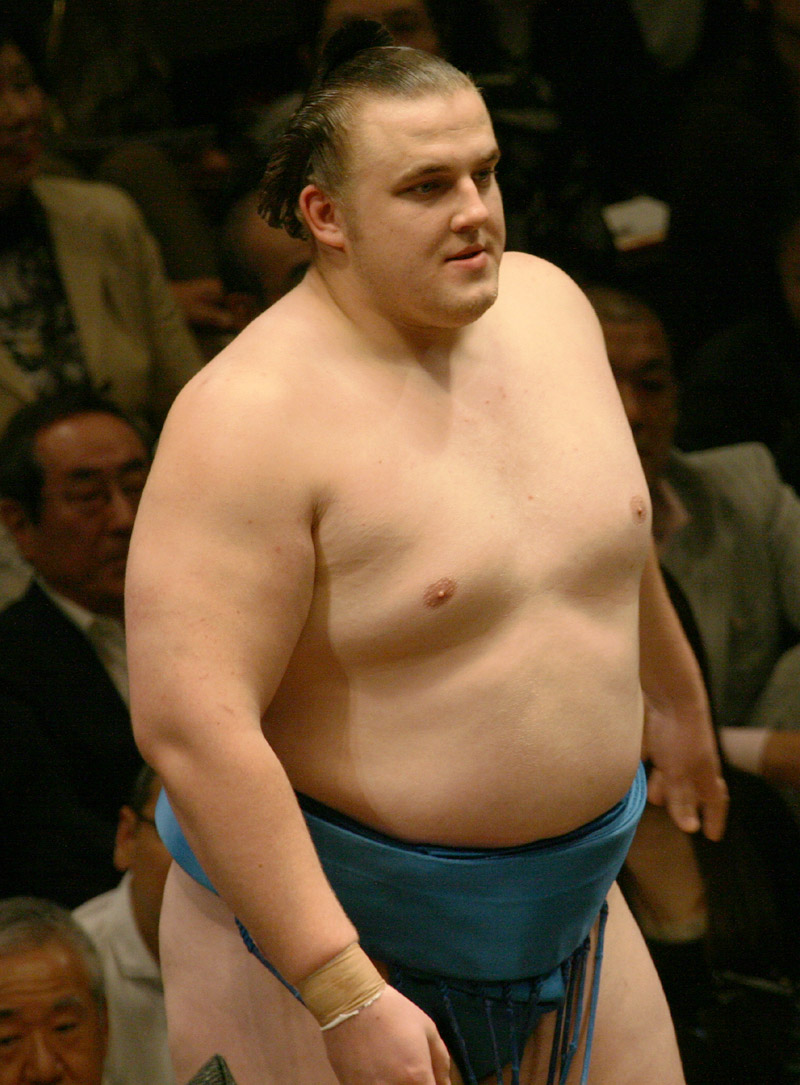
Baruto was a runner-up in March

- 23rd: In a reversal of fortunes from the January tournament in Tokyo, Asashoryu defeats Hakuho on the final day in Osaka to win his 22nd yusho, and his first since July 2007, with a 13–2 score. Hakuho finishes runner-up on 12–3, level with the maegashira Kokkai and Baruto, who each receive a share of the Fighting Spirit Award. Tochiozan wins 11 bouts and the Technique Award, while sekiwake Kotoshogiku is awarded the Outstanding Performance prize for being the first wrestler to beat Asashoryu on Day 12. Ozeki Kotoōshū withdraws through injury with only two wins, meaning he will be kadoban (in danger of demotion) in May. Kimurayama wins his first juryo division championship. Announcing their retirements are former maegashira Shunketsu, and makushita wrestler Asahimaru, an extremely successful amateur champion who missed the whole of 2003 through injury and was never able to make the sekitori ranks.

=== May ===
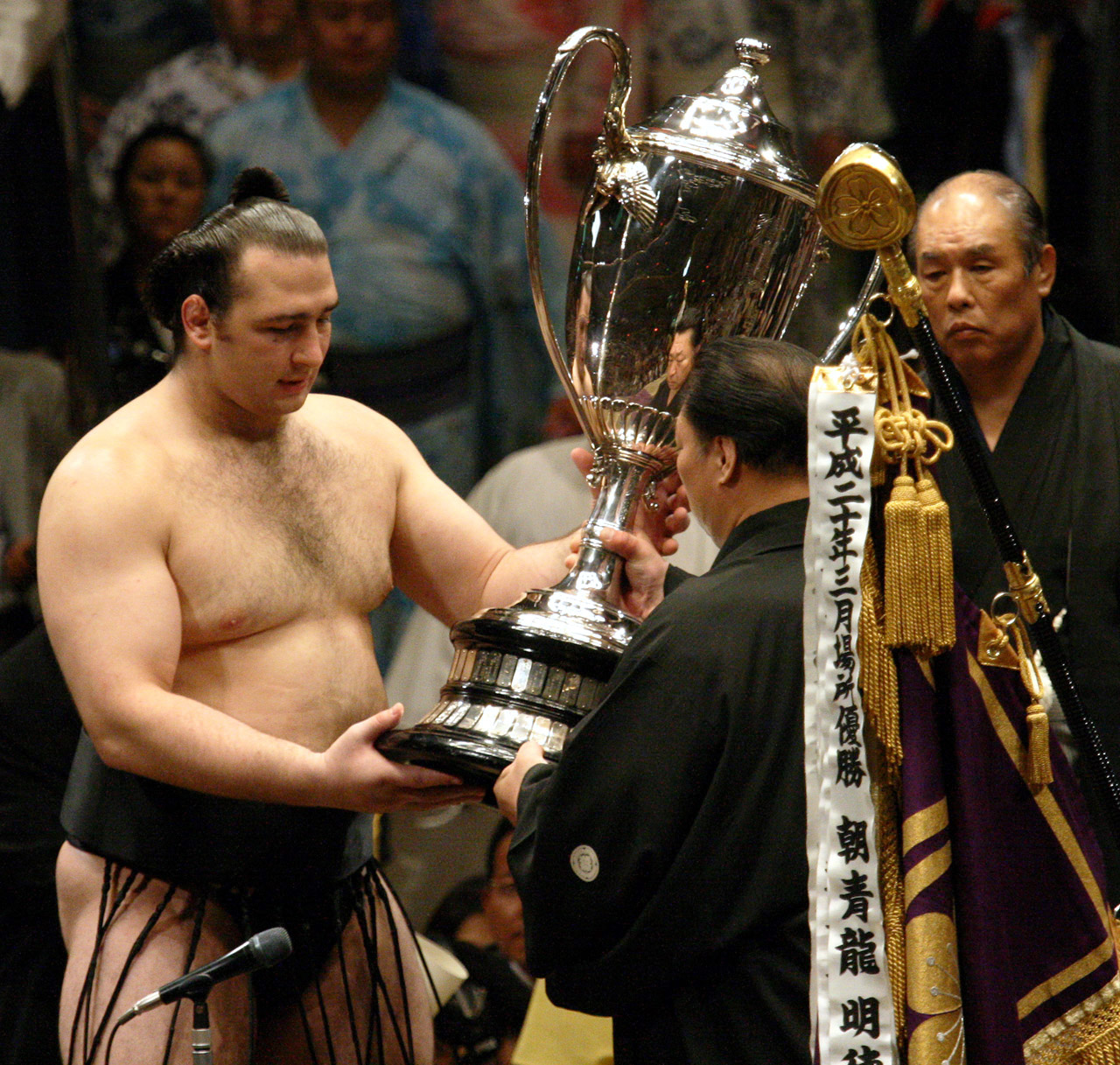
Kotooshu receives the Emperor's Cup in May

- 26: Bulgarian Kotooshu bounces back from his disappointing performance in March to win his first top division championship with a 14–1 record, becoming the first European to do so. His only defeat was to Aminishiki on Day 13, who wins his third Outstanding Performance Award. Asashoryu and Hakuho finish behind the pace on 11–4 and attract controversy after bad-temperedly pushing and glaring at each other after their match on the final day. Toyonoshima also wins 11 bouts and receives the Fighting Spirit Award. Kisenosato is also awarded the Fighting Spirit prize for his 10–5 mark at the rank of komusubi, while sekiwake Ama earns his third Technique Award. In the juryo division Chiyohakuho wins his first yusho, and former maegashira Tamaasuka wins the makushita championship.
- 27: The head of the Sumo Association sees both Asashoryu and Hakuho separately and gives each a strict warning over their conduct in the previous day's bout.

=== June ===
- 7–8: An exhibition tournament is held in Los Angeles for the first time in 27 years, at the Memorial Arena.

=== July ===
- 2nd: Asashoryu uses his position as head of the wrestlers union to call for all salaried rikishi to be given a pay raise of ten percent (which would be their first pay raise since 2001) to compensate for the rising cost of food and fuel. The Sumo Association are reportedly unimpressed with his remarks.
- 27th: Hakuho wins the tournament held in Nagoya with a perfect 15–0 record. His yokozuna rival Asashoryu withdraws after a defeat to Tochinonada on day 5, citing an injury to his elbow. Talk of Kotooshu's possible promotion to yokozuna is silenced after he turns in a mediocre 9–6 score. Ozeki Kotomitsuki finishes as runner-up to Hakuho, but four wins behind. Ama wins another Technique award and scores 10–5, while Toyonoshima also finishes on 10–5 and receives the Outstanding Performance prize. The Fighting Spirit award goes to maegashira Toyohibiki for his ten wins. Veteran Bushuyama wins the juryo division championship. Former maegashira Satoyama wins the makushita yusho, defeating Yamamotoyama, amongst others, in a playoff. Yamamotoyama is nonetheless promoted to the juryo division after the tournament.

=== August ===
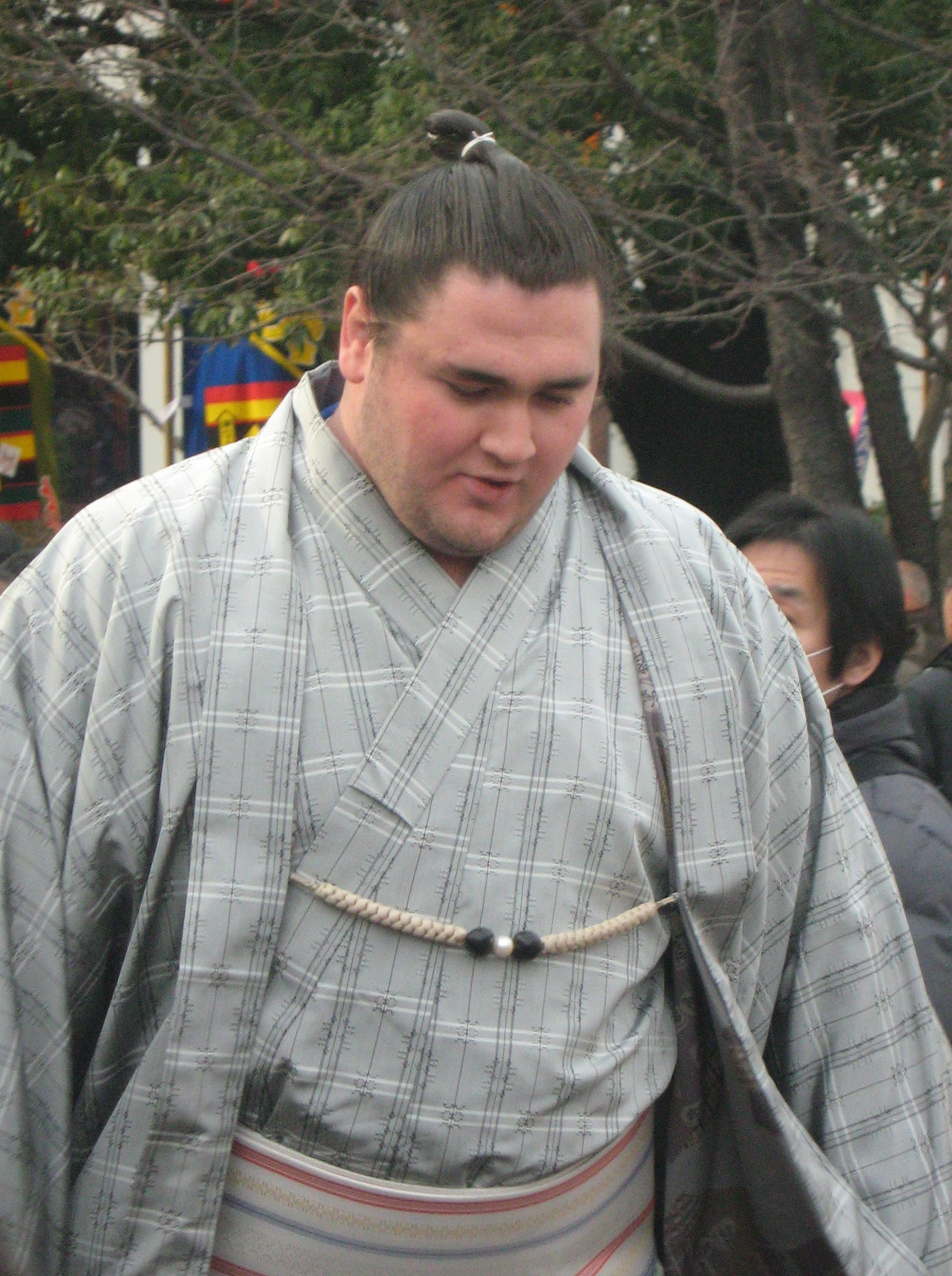
Wakanoho

- 18th: Russian maegashira Wakanoho is arrested for cannabis possession after his wallet, lost in June, is turned in to police and found to contain a cigarette mixed with the illegal drug. Police search his home and discover more evidence of cannabis use.
- 21st: The elders of the Sumo Association meet and decide on the immediate dismissal of Wakanoho. His name is removed from the banzuke ranking sheets for the September tournament, with the Maegashira 8 East position left blank. His stablemaster Magaki (the former yokozuna Wakanohana II) steps down from the Association's board of directors.
- 28th: Asashoryu defeats Hakuho in a playoff to win an exhibition tournament held in Mongolia and receives a trophy from Mongolian President Nambaryn Enkhbayar. The tournament attracts live television and front-page newspaper coverage in Mongolia.

=== September ===
- 2nd: Drug tests are carried out on all sekitori ranked wrestlers in the wake of Wakanoho's dismissal, and two other Russian wrestlers, brothers Roho and Hakurozan, test positive for cannabis.
- 8th: The Sumo Association announce the immediate dismissals of Roho and Hakurozan, who both deny ever taking banned substances. The head of the Sumo Association Kitanoumi, who is also Hakurozan's stablemaster, announces his resignation, although he remains on the board of directors. He is replaced as chairman by Musashigawa (former yokozuna Mienoumi). On the same day, police charges against Wakanoho are dropped due to his age and the small quantity of the drug found in his possession, and he is released from jail.
- 10th: Wakanoho visits the Sumo Association and asks to be readmitted to sumo, but his request is turned down.
- 11th: Wakanoho files a lawsuit against the Sumo Association claiming unfair dismissal.
- 14th: The Aki basho opens, without Wakanoho, Roho or Hakurozan. New chairman Musashigawa announces that judges have been instructed to call back any wrestlers who do not perform the tachi-ai properly and make them start the bout again. This leads to a large number of false starts and criticism from commentators over the new rules.

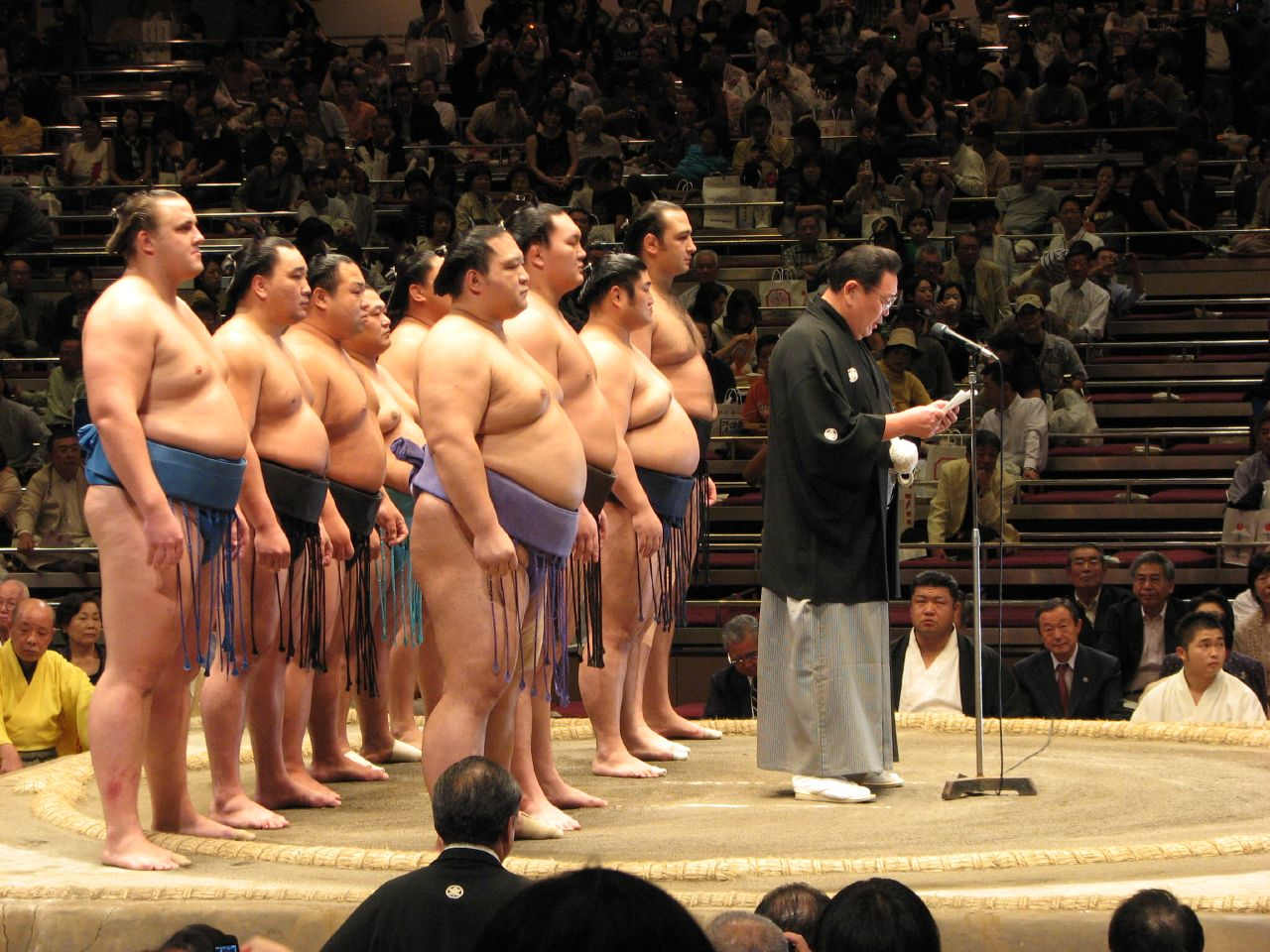
New JSA head Musashigawa addresses the crowd on the final day of the September tournament

- 28th: Hakuho wins the tournament with a 14–1 record. Once again he does not have to face Asashoryu, who withdraws on Day 10, prompting speculation about his possible retirement. Ama finishes as runner-up with twelve wins and wins the Outstanding Performance Award, and is seen as a candidate for promotion to ozeki next time. Goeido takes the Fighting Spirit prize. The one remaining Russian sekitori, Aran, wins the juryo championship. Veteran former sekiwake Tamakasuga announces his retirement.
- 28th: The small Araiso stable closes, as its stablemaster is approaching the mandatory retirement age.
- 29th: At a press conference, the former Wakanoho alleges he was involved in match-fixing or yaocho, which he details in a series of interviews with the tabloid Shukan Gendai. The opponents he names all deny the allegations.
- 30th: Three external directors are added to the Sumo Association's board, as demanded by the Ministry of Education after the recent scandals.

=== October ===
- 3rd: In the first ever court appearance by a yokozuna, Asashoryu takes the stand on behalf of the Sumo Association in a lawsuit brought against the Shukan Gendai over separate match-fixing allegations made by the magazine in January 2007. He denies ever taking part in rigged bouts, calling the allegations "complete lies." (In March 2009 a judge rules in favour of the Sumo Association.)
- 6th: Asashoryu travels to his homeland of Mongolia to receive treatment for his injured elbow. He sits out this month's regional tour and also misses the Kyushu honbasho.
- 7th: The trial begins in the Nagoya District Court of the three wrestlers from the Tokitsukaze stable alleged to have caused bodily injury resulting in the death of trainee Tokitaizan, real name Takashi Saito. The three admit wrongdoing but say they were only following the orders of their former stablemaster Junichi Yamamoto, who denies the charges and is being tried at a later date.
- 28th: Roho and Hakurozan launch a lawsuit against the Sumo Association seeking their re-admission to sumo.
- 29th: The Tokyo District Court turns down Wakanoho's lawsuit seeking to nullify his dismissal by the Sumo Association.

=== November ===
- 23rd: In the Kyushu basho in Fukuoka Hakuho wins his third straight championship, defeating Ama in a playoff after both men finish with 13–2 records. Ama seals his promotion to ozeki and receives the Technique Prize. Asashoryu misses the tournament, and ozeki Kaio pulls out after three days. Aminishiki wins the Outstanding Performance Award, and maegashira Yoshikaze gets the Fighting Spirit Prize for his fine 11–4 score. Mongolian Shotenro wins the juryo yusho at his first attempt.
- 26th: Ama's promotion to ozeki is officially confirmed. To mark the occasion his ring name is changed to Harumafuji.
- 28th: Wakanoho retracts all his match-fixing allegations and issues an apology.

=== December ===
- 10th: The Tokyo High Court rejects an appeal brought by Wakanoho over a lower court ruling that his dismissal from sumo was fair.
- 18th: The three Tokitsukaze stable wrestlers are found guilty and given suspended sentences of between two and a half and three years. All are also dismissed from the Sumo Association.
- 19th: The Sumo Association announces the cancellation of the scheduled overseas exhibition tournament in London that was due to take place in 2009, because of uncertainties caused by the 2008 financial crisis. it is the first time a foreign jungyo has been cancelled.

== Deaths ==
- 11 August: Former sekiwake Arase, aged 59.
- 15 December: Former makushita Wakamiume, aged 25, of leukemia.

== See also ==
- Glossary of sumo terms
- List of active sumo wrestlers
- List of past sumo wrestlers
- List of years in sumo
- List of yokozuna
