= Kotokasuga Keigo =

Japanese sumo wrestler (born 1977)

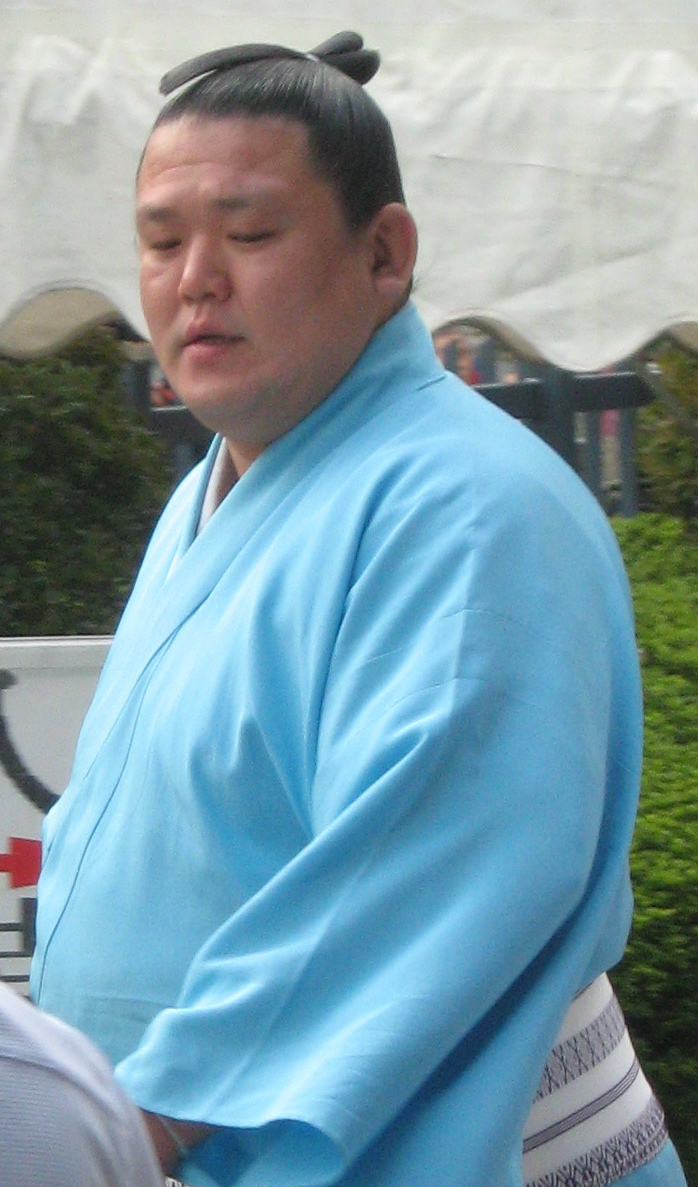

Personal information
- Native name: 琴春日 桂吾
- Born: Keigo Yamada; 25 August 1977 (age 49) Kasuga, Fukuoka, Japan
- Height: 1.82 m (5 ft 11 1/2 in)
- Weight: 148 kg (326 lb; 23.3 st)

Sport
- Sport: Sumo
- Retired: April. 2011
- Heya: Sadogatake
- Record: 491–457–9
- Debut: March, 1993
- Highest rank: Maegashira 7 (November, 2010)
- Updated on January 2011

Kotokasuga Keigo (琴春日 桂吾, Kotokasuga Keigo; born 25 August 1977 as Keigo Yamada) is a former sumo wrestler from Kasuga, Fukuoka Prefecture, Japan. He began his professional career in 1993, reaching the top makuuchi division some 15 years later in 2008. His highest rank was maegashira 7. He retired in April 2011 after the Japan Sumo Association found him guilty of involvement in match-fixing.

== Career ==
At elementary school he was a softball player and at junior high school he excelled at baseball. After his graduation he was recruited by Sadogatake stable, and made his professional debut in March 1993. Initially fighting under the shikona of Kotonoyama, he progressed to the sandanme division in 1995, and first reached the makushita division in 1997. He adopted the name of Kotokasuga in 1999, in honour of his hometown. In November 2004 he finally made the elite sekitori ranks when he was promoted to the jūryō division. He was ranked in jūryō for four further tournaments in May, July and September 2005 and January 2006, but then struggled again in makushita. After injuries to both his elbows he considered retiring, but he won promotion back to jūryō in September 2007 at the age of 30, and then four consecutive kachi-koshi or winning records saw him promoted to the top makuuchi division in May 2008. It had taken him 91 tournaments from his professional debut to get there, the second slowest ever at the time. He could only manage a 4–11 record in his top division debut and dropped back to jūryō. However, he made a return to makuuchi in September 2010, and on this occasion came through with a winning score of 9–6. This saw him promoted to his highest rank of maegashira 7 for the November 2010 tournament.

== Retirement from sumo ==
In April 2011, along with 19 other wrestlers and coaches, he was ordered to retire by the Sumo Association after an investigation found he arranged the result of matches. He submitted retirement papers on 4 April. His danpatsu-shiki or retirement ceremony was held at the Ryogoku Kokugikan in June 2011. He now runs a yakiniku restaurant in Fukuoka city.

== Fighting style ==
Kotokasuga was an oshi-sumo specialist who preferred pushing and thrusting to fighting on the mawashi. His most common winning kimarite was oshi-dashi (push out), closely followed by yori-kiri (force out). Together these two techniques accounted for half his career victories.

== Personal life ==
Kotokasuga announced upon his promotion to the top division in May 2008 that he was marrying an old classmate who he became re-acquainted with after the March tournament of 2006 and who he began dating in May of that year. Kotokasuga pointed out that he had not had a make-koshi or losing record since they got together. He had first proposed to her in November 2009, but her father had insisted that Kotokasuga reach makuuchi first.

== Career record ==
Kotokasuga Keigo
Year	January Hatsu basho, Tokyo	March Haru basho, Osaka	May Natsu basho, Tokyo	July Nagoya basho, Nagoya	September Aki basho, Tokyo	November Kyūshū basho, Fukuoka
1993	x	(Maezumo)	East Jonokuchi #32; 4–3	West Jonidan #178; 4–3	West Jonidan #144; 4–3	West Jonidan #112; 3–4
1994	East Jonidan #140; 4–3	West Jonidan #111; 4–2–1	East Jonidan #91; 5–2	West Jonidan #51; 3–4	East Jonidan #75; 3–4	West Jonidan #90; 6–1
1995	East Jonidan #18; 3–4	West Jonidan #40; 4–3	West Jonidan #16; 3–4	East Jonidan #31; 5–2	West Sandanme #97; 3–4	East Jonidan #14; 5–2
1996	East Sandanme #71; 2–5	East Sandanme #99; 5–2	West Sandanme #60; 5–2	West Sandanme #26; 4–3	West Sandanme #11; 3–4	East Sandanme #26; 4–3
1997	East Sandanme #13; 5–2	West Makushita #54; 1–6	East Sandanme #28; 5–2	West Makushita #60; 4–3	West Makushita #50; 2–5	East Sandanme #11; 4–3
1998	East Makushita #59; 4–3	East Makushita #50; 2–5	West Sandanme #10; 5–2	East Makushita #51; 2–5	East Sandanme #13; 4–3	West Sandanme #2; 3–4
1999	West Sandanme #16; 5–2	East Makushita #56; 2–5	West Sandanme #22; 4–3	East Sandanme #10; 3–4	West Sandanme #21; 6–1	West Makushita #47; 3–4
2000	West Sandanme #2; 5–2	East Makushita #41; 2–5	West Makushita #56; 2–5	East Sandanme #23; 5–2	West Makushita #59; Sat out due to injury 0–0–7	East Sandanme #39; 5–2
2001	East Sandanme #13; 3–4	West Sandanme #26; 5–2	East Sandanme #2; 6–1	East Makushita #29; 3–4	West Makushita #40; 3–4	East Makushita #53; 1–6
2002	West Sandanme #25; 5–2	West Makushita #59; 4–3	West Makushita #51; 5–2	West Makushita #30; 4–3	West Makushita #22; 3–4	West Makushita #30; 3–4
2003	East Makushita #41; 4–3	East Makushita #33; 4–3	East Makushita #28; 4–3	East Makushita #21; 4–3	West Makushita #15; 5–2	East Makushita #8; 3–4
2004	West Makushita #10; 4–3	East Makushita #8; 6–1	East Makushita #1; 3–4	East Makushita #4; 4–3	West Makushita #1; 4–3	East Jūryō #14; 7–8
2005	East Makushita #1; 3–4	East Makushita #4; 4–3	West Jūryō #13; 8–7	West Jūryō #8; 6–9	West Jūryō #10; 5–10	West Makushita #1; 4–3
2006	West Jūryō #12; 5–10	West Makushita #2; 1–6	West Makushita #22; 2–5	West Makushita #37; 4–3	East Makushita #30; 5–2	East Makushita #18; 5–2
2007	East Makushita #8; 4–3	East Makushita #7; 4–3	West Makushita #4; 5–2	East Makushita #1; 6–1	East Jūryō #10; 9–6	West Jūryō #6; 8–7
2008	East Jūryō #4; 8–7	East Jūryō #3; 8–7	East Maegashira #16; 4–11	East Jūryō #5; 6–8–1	East Jūryō #8; 6–9	East Jūryō #11; 10–5
2009	West Jūryō #4; 6–9	West Jūryō #8; 8–7	West Jūryō #5; 7–8	East Jūryō #7; 8–7	West Jūryō #3; 6–9	West Jūryō #6; 8–7
2010	West Jūryō #2; 5–10	East Jūryō #6; 9–6	West Jūryō #2; 8–7	East Jūryō #1; 8–7	East Maegashira #11; 9–6	East Maegashira #7; 5–10
2011	West Maegashira #13; 8–7	Tournament Cancelled; 0–0–0	East Maegashira #13; Retired –	x	x	x
Record given as wins–losses–absences Top division champion Top division runner-up Retired Lower divisions Non-participation Sanshō key: F=Fighting spirit; O=Outstanding performance; T=Technique Also shown: ★=Kinboshi; P=Playoff(s); Divisions: Makuuchi — Jūryō — Makushita — Sandanme — Jonidan — Jonokuchi Makuuchi ranks: Yokozuna — Ōzeki — Sekiwake — Komusubi — Maegashira

== See also ==
- Glossary of sumo terms
- List of past sumo wrestlers
