= Match-fixing in professional sumo =

Match-fixing in professional sumo is an allegation that has plagued professional sumo for decades. Due to the amount of money changing hands depending on rank and prize money, there had been numerous reports of yaochō (八百長) (corruption, bout-fixing) in professional sumo for years before it was finally definitively proven to exist in 2011. The hierarchical structure of the sport, in which a minority of top-ranked wrestlers have great advantages in salary, privileges, and status over the lower-ranked wrestlers that make up the majority of sumo participants, may have contributed to the use of match-fixing in order to prolong careers for top-ranked wrestlers and assist in the distribution of promotions.

== Previous speculation ==
In 2002, Steven Levitt and Mark Duggan published a paper using econometrics in order to suggest that corruption in sumo exists. Popularized in Levitt's book Freakonomics, the study found that 70% of wrestlers with 7–7 records on the final day of the tournament (i.e., seven wins and seven losses, and one fight to go) won. The percentage was found to rise the more times the two wrestlers had met, and decrease when the wrestler was due to retire. The study found that the 7–7 wrestlers won around 80% of the time when statistics suggest they had a probability of winning only 48.7% of the time against their opponents. Levitt and Duggan concluded that those who already have 8 wins collude with those who are 7–7 and let them win, since the 8-win wrestlers had already secured their ranking.

A possible counter-argument to the Freakonomics conclusion is that a 7–7 rikishi (wrestler) was highly motivated to win his last match to gain promotion, rather than demotion, while the 8–6 rikishi had already guaranteed his promotion, so was not as motivated. The authors revealed a more damning statistic, however. According to their research, the next tournament in which the two wrestlers met, there was a significant advantage to the 8–6 wrestler over the 7–7, regardless of the performance of either wrestler. The previously 7–7 wrestler would win only 40% percent of the rematches with the 8–6 wrestler. The authors suggested that winning 80% in the first match and then only 40% in the rematch (and back to the expected 50% in subsequent matches) between the same wrestlers suggested a rigging of the bouts. Additionally, the authors found that after allegations of rigging by the media, 7–7 wrestlers won only 50% of their matches against 8–6 wrestlers instead of 80%.

== Previous allegations ==
When the former sumo wrestler Kōnoshin Suga, also known as Onaruto stablemaster, and his supporter Seiichiro Hashimoto came forward with allegations of match rigging, drug use, sexcapades, tax evasion, and close ties to the Yakuza, both were found dead in the same hospital, hours apart on April 14, 1996, though there was no proof of poisoning. Weekly tabloid Shūkan Gendai alleged in a series of articles in the 1980s and 1990s that bouts were fixed.

In 2000, in both speeches and a tell-all book, former wrestler Keisuke Itai stated that up to 80% of sumo bouts were fixed. In 2007, Shūkan Gendai reported that yokozuna Asashōryū had been paying wrestlers to throw matches to him. A court later ordered Kodansha, the journal's publisher, to pay ¥44 million to the Japan Sumo Association over the allegations.

In September 2008, Soslan Gagloev, a Russian rikishi who wrestled under the shikona Wakanohō who was expelled for violation of drug policy, claimed he was forced to accept bribes to forfeit sumo matches. He implicated fellow Eastern European rikishi, ōzeki Kotoōshū, then jūryō wrestler Kasuganishiki and later ōzeki Kaiō and Chiyotaikai. He would later retract these claims, but then changed his position in 2011 yet again, when definitive allegations of match-fixing came to light.

== 2011 investigation ==
In February 2011, Japan's Ministry of Education, Culture, Sports, Science and Technology and National Police Agency announced that an investigation into allegations of baseball gambling by sumo wrestlers and officials had discovered cell phone text messages indicating that some matches had been fixed. Allegedly, 14 wrestlers or stablemasters were involved. Three wrestlers, Chiyohakuhō, Kasuganishiki (who had recently retired to become a coach under the elder name Takenawa), and Enatsukasa, reportedly admitted to throwing or fixing bouts. As a result of the independent investigation, the board of directors of the Japan Sumo Association (JSA) decided in an extraordinary meeting to cancel the March 2011 tournament in Osaka. The last time a Grand Tournament had been canceled was in 1946, when repairs to the old Ryōgoku Kokugikan, which had been extensively damaged in World War II, were not completed in time. Also, a regional exhibition tournament in Akita Prefecture on August 8, 2011, was cancelled.

In the end, 23 wrestlers in total were judged guilty of match-fixing and all were expelled. The JSA's investigative panel stated in May 2011 that match-fixing appears to have been widespread. The panel stated that it would be difficult to discover, however, the full extent of the problem. Uncovering the problem is made even more difficult by the existence of a separate form of collusion ("koi ni yoru mukiryoku-zumo" in Japanese, meaning deliberate lack of effort in a sumo bout), which refers to a rikishi going lightly on an opponent without the exchange of money. In sumo culture especially, individual gain must be subordinated to the rights of the group, meaning that certain wrestlers have appeared duty-bound by their organization's style to help popular or senior wrestlers in need.

The wrestlers not listed above who admitted to match-fixing and accepted expulsion are as follows: Asōfuji, Hakuba, Hoshihikari, Kasugaō, Kiyoseumi, Kirinowaka, Kōryū, Kotokasuga, Kyokunankai, Masatsukasa, Mōkonami, Sakaizawa, Shimotori, Shirononami, Tokusegawa, Toyozakura, Wakatenro, and Yamamotoyama. Two more wrestlers, Hoshikaze and Sōkokurai, never admitted any involvement and were forcibly expelled several days later. Sōkokurai was later exonerated and reinstated; see below for more information.

== Policies to combat match-fixing ==
Soon after the match-fixing scandal, in March 2011, an 8-member committee commissioned by the JSA put forth six recommendations, later expanded to eight, for preventing future match-fixing:

1. Strengthening the investigative panel.
2. A system of regulations for conduct in dressing rooms (where much of the match-fixing collusion was alleged to have taken place) as well as strengthening of existing regulations.
3. Establishing a hotline for anonymous reporting of match-fixing.
4. Adopting expanded regulations for disciplining of wrestlers for intentional "lethargic sumo" (a long used euphemism for letting one's opponent win).
5. Guidance and training for stable owners.
6. Guidance and education for wrestlers.
7. Considering the establishment of a new system exempting wrestlers on injured leave from pay deduction or demotion (this was an acknowledgement that the pressure of being demoted and losing significant salary after injury was a contributing factor in many cases of match-fixing).
8. Consideration of a policy to encourage a resurgence in competitive spirit in sumo.

== Court cases ==
Two of the wrestlers implicated by the JSA, Hoshikaze and Sōkokurai, never admitted any wrongdoing and were expelled when they refused to submit resignation papers. Both wrestlers, in separate cases, took the JSA to court. Hoshikaze lost his court case in May 2012 and an appeal was denied in October of that year, with a final appeal also denied in October 2013. Sōkokurai succeeded in his case, and the JSA decided not to appeal. Sōkokurai was reinstated and re-appeared on the banzuke for the July 2013 tournament with his prior rank restored.

== See also ==
- Controversies in professional sumo
- 2011 in sumo
