= Hakurozan Yūta =

Sumo wrestler

Personal information
- Native name: 白露山 佑太
- Born: Batraz Feliksovich Boradzov; February 6, 1982 (age 44) Ordzhonikidze, North Ossetian ASSR, Russian SFSR, USSR
- Height: 1.89 m (6 ft 2 1/2 in)
- Weight: 137 kg (302 lb)

Sport
- Sport: Sumo
- Retired: September, 2008
- Heya: Kitanoumi, formerly Hatachiyama
- Record: 233-218-0
- Debut: May 2002
- Highest rank: Maegashira 2 (July 2006)
- Updated on September 2008

Hakurozan Yūta (born February 6, 1982, as Batraz Feliksovich Boradzov, Russian: Батраз Феликсович Борадзов) is a former sumo wrestler. The highest rank he reached was maegashira 2. His older brother is also a former sumo wrestler under the name of Rohō of Ōtake stable. In September 2008, both were dismissed from professional sumo after testing positive for cannabis.

== Career ==
Hakurozan began wrestling at the age of 14, winning the world junior championship aged 16. He started sumo at age 18, winning the Moscow over 100 kg championship.

He came to Japan in February 2002 with his brother. They had intended to join the same stable, but sumo regulations limit the number of foreign wrestlers to one per stable, so Batraz joined Hatachiyama stable while Soslan entered Ōtake stable. As with his brother, his shikona contains the character 露, which can mean Russia. Hatachiyama stable folded upon the death of its stablemaster, former ōzeki Hokutenyū, and Hakurozan joined the Kitanoumi stable.

Hakurozan fought his first bout in May 2002, rising to jūryō in September 2004, and makuuchi in July 2005. After a 10–5 result in May 2006 he reached maegashira 2, but a disastrous 2-13 the following tournament took him down to maegashira 10. He clung on to his top division status with an 8–7 mark at maegashira 14 in January 2007, but a poor 5–10 record in March meant he was demoted back to jūryō for the May 2007 tournament. He achieved nine wins there, which was enough to earn promotion to the top division in July. However, hampered by chronic knee problems, he could manage only three wins in the November 2007 tournament and was demoted to the second division once again. Scraping by with two 8-7 marks in the first two tournaments of 2008, he returned to makuuchi at maegashira 15 in May. Once again he could not maintain his top division ranking, only managing to win four matches.

== Fighting style ==
Hakurozan often relied on sidestepping at the tachi-ai, like his brother. He frequently employed pull-down techniques such as hataki-komi and hiki-otoshi. Although yorikiri, or force out, was listed on his Sumo Association profile as his favourite technique, with a migi-yotsu or left hand outside and right hand inside grip as his preference, he ended up using hataki-komi more than any other winning technique throughout his career.

== Cannabis scandal and dismissal ==
On September 2, 2008, he and his brother Rohō had a positive test result for cannabis. This test occurred less than two weeks after fellow Russian Wakanohō was sacked after being arrested for cannabis possession, and the surprise inspection was taken on 69 jūryō and higher ranked wrestlers including the two yokozuna. Although the Metropolitan Police Department questioned the two wrestlers and searched their rooms, no further legal action was taken because it is not illegal to fail a drug test under Japanese law.

On September 6, Hakurozan and Rohō failed a second, more detailed set of doping tests conducted by an internationally certified laboratory, Mitsubishi Chemical Medience Corp, which showed levels of the drug far beyond what could be consumed by secondhand smoke.

On September 8, the Japan Sumo Association held a meeting of the board of directors and decided on the dismissals of Rohō and Hakurozan. The chairman of the Sumo Association, Kitanoumi, resigned to take responsibility as Hakurozan belonged to his stable. Kitanoumi said that Hakurozan "had told me he had not used it, and I believed him." Both wrestlers moved out of their respective stables but stayed in Japan on short term visas and continued to deny any wrongdoing.

On October 28, the brothers filed a lawsuit against the Sumo Association with the Tokyo District Court seeking to revoke their dismissals, claiming the tests were administered incorrectly. They also sought 100 million yen in damages. Their demands were rejected by the court in March 2009, the judge saying "“It is recognisable that the two used marijuana...and the use of marijuana was an act to damage trust of the association." The lawyer for the brothers indicated that they would appeal the ruling.

The brothers reappeared in court on June 29, 2009, testifying for two and a half hours and criticising the conduct of the tests once again. Cross-examination of witnesses began on August 31, with Isenoumi Oyakata, Tomozuna Oyakata and Otake Oyakata among those called. Kitanoumi, Hakrozan's stablemaster, testified on December 21, saying he voted for expulsion "mainly because Hakurozan was my deshi and I didn't want to be seen as protecting him." Unlike his brother, Hakurozan was not in attendance as he has returned to Russia.

The court found in favour of the Sumo Association on April 19, 2010, with the judge saying, "It has been proven that urine samples which showed positive results for marijuana were theirs, and it is unthinkable that they were mixed up with samples of others... the association's decision to dismiss them was adequate given that the use of illegal drugs had become a serious social problem." The District Court's ruling was upheld by the Tokyo High Court on November 18, 2010.

== Career record ==
Hakurozan Yūta
Year	January Hatsu basho, Tokyo	March Haru basho, Osaka	May Natsu basho, Tokyo	July Nagoya basho, Nagoya	September Aki basho, Tokyo	November Kyūshū basho, Fukuoka
2002	x	x	(Maezumo)	East Jonokuchi #41; 6–1	East Jonidan #70; 5–2	West Jonidan #28; 6–1
2003	West Sandanme #64; 6–1	West Sandanme #9; 5–2	West Makushita #49; 5–2	East Makushita #32; 3–4	West Makushita #40; 4–3	West Makushita #33; 3–4
2004	West Makushita #37; 4–3	West Makushita #28; 4–3	East Makushita #23; 6–1	West Makushita #5; 5–2	East Jūryō #14; 8–7	West Jūryō #12; 8–7
2005	East Jūryō #7; 10–5	West Jūryō #1; 6–9	West Jūryō #3; 10–5	West Maegashira #14; 8–7	East Maegashira #12; 7–8	East Maegashira #13; 10–5
2006	East Maegashira #4; 4–11	East Maegashira #12; 9–6	West Maegashira #8; 10–5	East Maegashira #2; 2–13	West Maegashira #10; 5–10	West Maegashira #14; 7–8
2007	West Maegashira #14; 8–7	East Maegashira #13; 5–10	West Jūryō #2; 9–6	East Maegashira #12; 6–9	East Maegashira #15; 9–6	West Maegashira #12; 3–12
2008	West Jūryō #3; 8–7	East Jūryō #2; 8–7	East Maegashira #15; 4–11	West Jūryō #4; 7–8	Dismissed	x
Record given as wins–losses–absences Top division champion Top division runner-up Retired Lower divisions Non-participation Sanshō key: F=Fighting spirit; O=Outstanding performance; T=Technique Also shown: ★=Kinboshi; P=Playoff(s); Divisions: Makuuchi — Jūryō — Makushita — Sandanme — Jonidan — Jonokuchi Makuuchi ranks: Yokozuna — Ōzeki — Sekiwake — Komusubi — Maegashira

== See also ==
- Glossary of sumo terms
- List of non-Japanese sumo wrestlers
- List of past sumo wrestlers
