= Rohō Yukio =

Russian-Japanese sumo wrestler

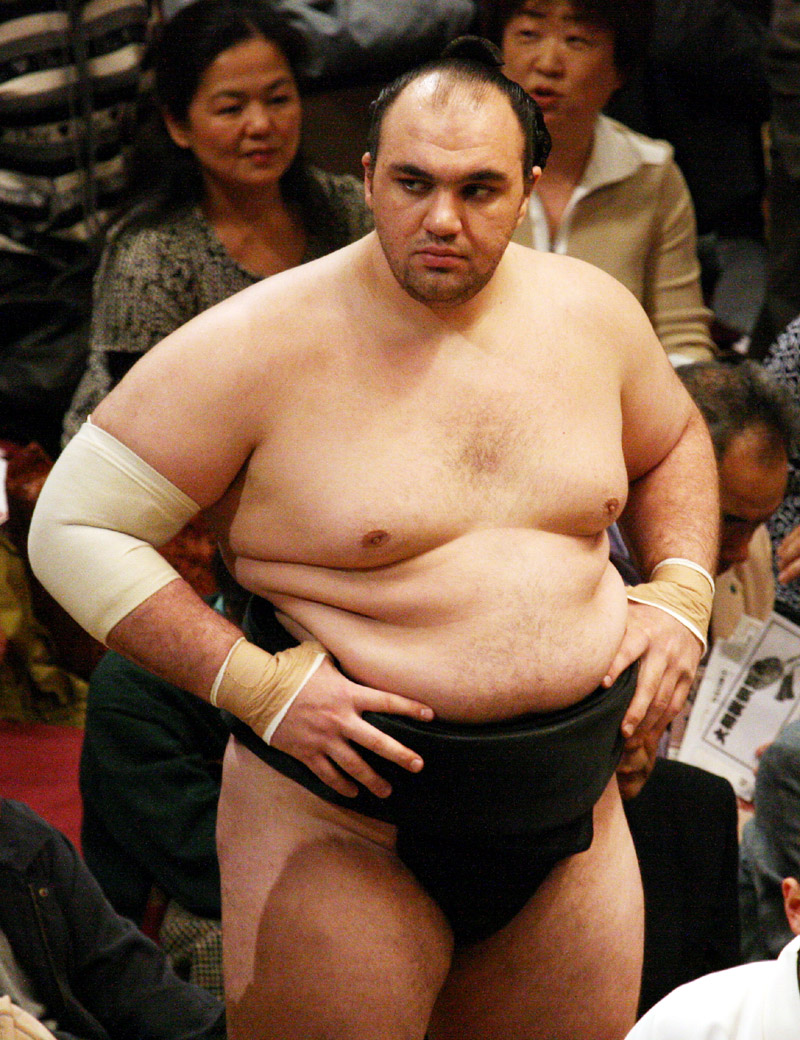

Personal information
- Native name: 露鵬 幸生
- Born: Soslan Feliksovich Boradzov; March 9, 1980 (age 46) Russia
- Height: 1.95 m (6 ft 5 in)
- Weight: 153 kg (337 lb)

Sport
- Sport: Sumo
- Retired: September, 2008
- Heya: Ōtake, formerly Taihō
- Record: 267–198–18
- Debut: May, 2002
- Highest rank: Komusubi (March, 2006)
- Championships: 1 (Jonidan); 1 (Jonokuchi)
- Special Prizes: Fighting Spirit (1)
- Updated on September 2008

Rohō Yukio (born March 9, 1980, as Soslan Feliksovich Boradzov, Russian: Сослан Феликсович Борадзов, in Vladikavkaz, Republic of North Ossetia–Alania in the Russian Federation) is a former sumo wrestler. The highest rank he achieved was komusubi. His younger brother is also a former sumo wrestler, under the name of Hakurozan. In September 2008 both were banned from the sport for life after testing positive for cannabis.

== Career ==
Rohō began wrestling at the age of 16. At 18 he won the world junior freestyle championship. As his weight increased beyond 130 kg he was unable to continue wrestling, so he took up sumo at the age of 20. In 2001 he came third in the heavyweight class in the Sumo World Championships, and won the European championship.

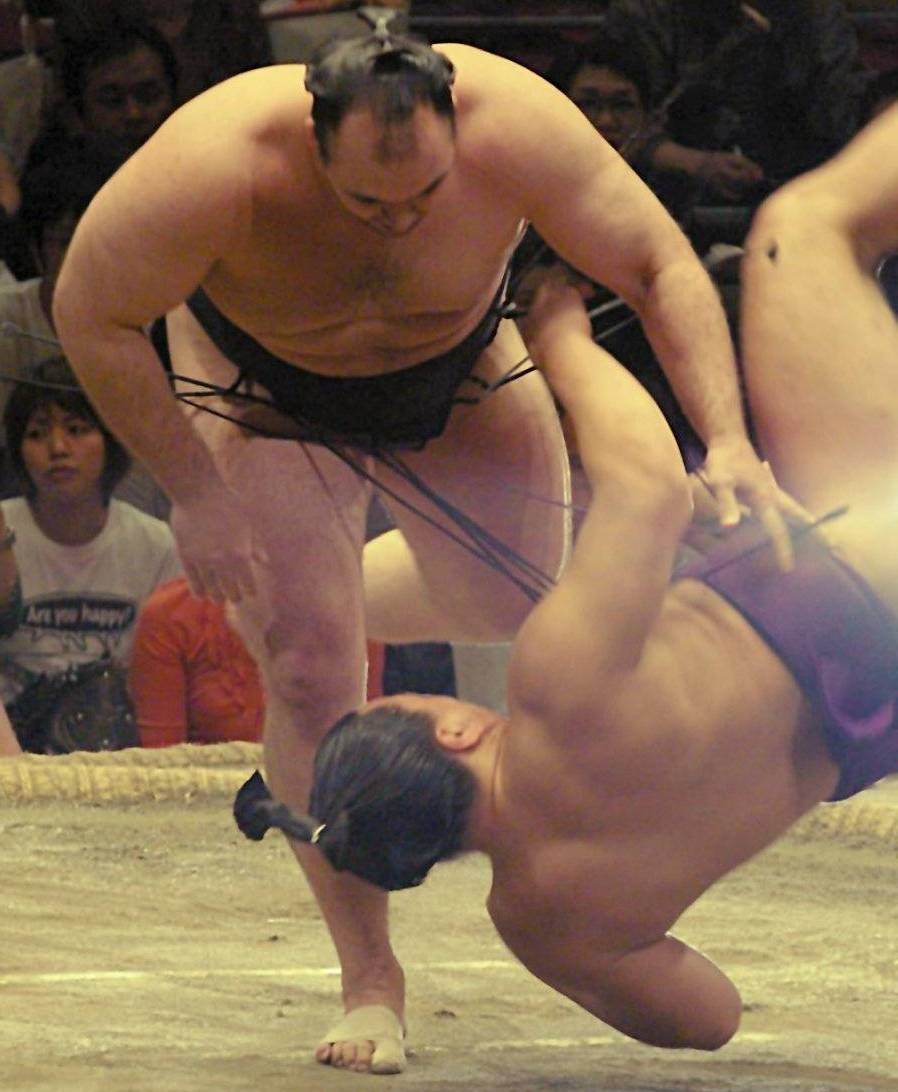
Roho throws Ama

He came to Japan in February 2002 with his brother, joining the stable of former Yokozuna Taihō (since transferred to Taihō's son-in-law, the former Takatōriki, and renamed Ōtake stable). His first appearance was in May 2002, and he won his first 19 bouts. He was promoted to jūryō in January 2004, then makuuchi for the September 2004 tournament. His result was 10–5 in this tournament, earning him the Fighting Spirit prize. He also achieved 10 wins in the November 2004 tournament, and by May 2005 reached maegashira 1, but suffered a losing tournament and so failed to reach sanyaku. In the next tournament, as a result of a leg injury, he only achieved 3 wins, with 8 losses and 4 absences. He won 8 bouts in the September tournament, then 10 in November (the same as his brother Hakurozan). In January 2006, ranked maegashira 2, he won 9 bouts and achieved promotion to east komusubi, the first Russian to reach this rank. In March of the same year he won only 4 bouts.

By the end of the sixth day of the July tournament he had achieved 4 wins and 2 losses. On the seventh day following a loss to Chiyotaikai, the two glared at each other and exchanged angry words. He later smashed a glass door of the bathroom and received a strong warning, but later assaulted two cameramen and was punished by suspension for three days. He returned on the 11th day to beat Kotoshōgiku, and went on to achieve a satisfactory 8–5–2 record for the tournament. In the next tournament, as M1, he achieved a good result of 10–5, returning to komusubi for November. Unusually, there were four komusubi in that tournament, as Aminishiki had achieved 11 wins in September, and Kisenosato and Kokkai had both achieved kachi-koshi.

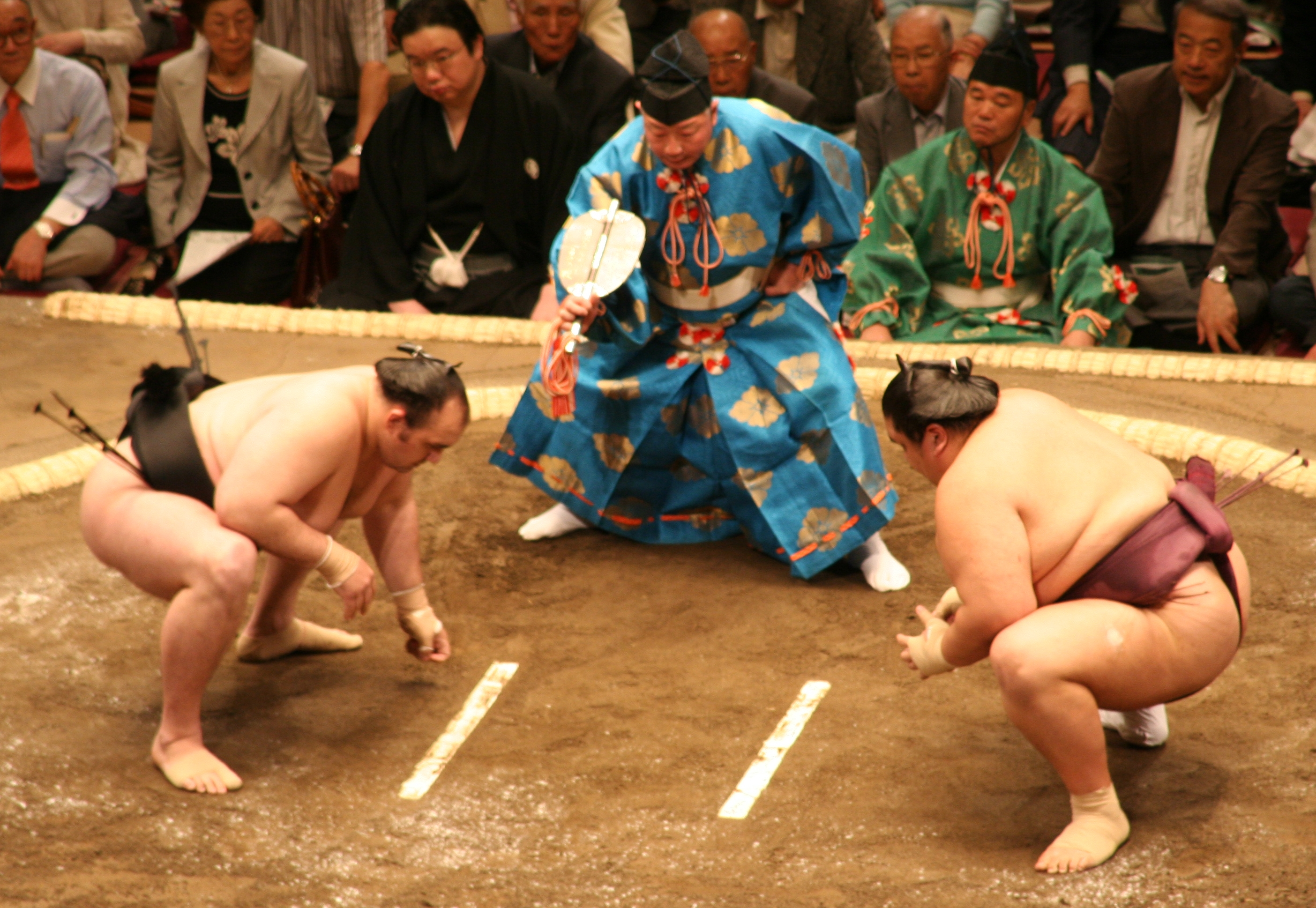
Rohō (left) faces Miyabiyama in a controversial bout.

After a poor 3–12 showing in January 2007 Rohō was demoted from komusubi. Back in the mid-maegashira ranks for March, he surprisingly failed to achieve a winning tournament, falling to his eighth defeat on the final day. Controversy continued to follow Rohō into the 2007 May tournament, where after a day one loss against Miyabiyama, Rohō claimed that he was not ready to start the bout and that it should have been declared a false start. However, neither the referee nor the judges intervened at the time and the result stood. In an interview after the match, Rohō questioned the referee's judgement. After criticism from the Sumo Association that such behaviour was not appropriate for a sumo wrestler, Rohō apologised. He ended the tournament with a solid 10–5 record. In July 2007, after winning his first three bouts, he injured his back and had to withdraw from the tournament. He remained in the middle maegashira ranks after that, and did not look like returning to sanyaku. He had to withdraw from the May 2008 tournament after injuring his back once again, but he had already attained eight wins.

He is a fan of Russian wrestler Fedor Emelianenko, and his interests include Russian cinema and music.

== Fighting style ==
Roho was a yotsu-sumo specialist, who preferred a migi-yotsu, or left hand outside, right hand inside grip on his opponent's mawashi. His favourite techniques were yorikiri (force out) and uwatenage (overarm throw), although he also relied heavily on henka (side stepping) and pull-downs. Hataki-komi, the slap-down, was his second most commonly used technique after yorikiri. Henka in particular is looked down upon by sumo purists, and Roho believed that his failure to receive a special prize from the Sumo Association in the March 2005 tournament, despite winning eleven bouts, was due to use of henka in his victory over Kotomitsuki.

== Cannabis scandal and dismissal ==
On September 2, 2008, he and his brother Hakurozan had a positive test result for cannabis. This test occurred less than two weeks after fellow Russian Wakanohō was sacked after being arrested for cannabis possession, and the surprise inspection was taken on 69 jūryō and higher ranked wrestlers, including the two yokozuna. Although the Metropolitan Police Department questioned the two wrestlers and searched their rooms, no further legal action was taken because it is not illegal to fail a drug test under Japanese law.

On September 6, Roho and Hakurozan failed a second, more detailed set of doping tests, and he announced that he would not accept the outcome of a second positive reading for drug use on the next day.

On September 8, the Japan Sumo Association held a meeting of the board of directors and decided on the dismissals of Rohō and Hakurozan. Both wrestlers moved out of their respective stables but remained in Japan on short term visas and continued to deny any wrongdoing. However it was reported by the Sumo Association that the brothers had admitted to officials at the testing that they had smoked cannabis whilst on a tour of Los Angeles in June.

On October 28, the brothers filed a lawsuit with the Tokyo District Court seeking to revoke their dismissals, arguing that the tests were administered incorrectly. They also sought 100 million yen in damages. Their demands were rejected by the court in March 2009, the judge saying "“It is recognisable that the two used marijuana...and the use of marijuana was an act to damage trust of the association." The lawyer for the brothers indicated that they would appeal the ruling.

They reappeared in court on June 29, 2009, testifying for two and a half hours and once again criticised the conduct of the tests. Cross examination of witnesses began on August 31, with Isenoumi Oyakata, Tomozuna Oyakata and Otake Oyakata called to the stand. Otake said he was promised by Isenoumi that Roho would not be dismissed if he agreed to take the more detailed tests. Isenoumi responded that Otake's testimony was "regrettable." Former Sumo Association chairman Kitanoumi testified on December 21, saying it was the supposed admission by the brothers that they had smoked on the LA tour that tipped the balance in favour of expulsion. Roho was in attendance, still wearing the traditional kimono and mage of a rikishi.

The Tokyo District Court found in favour of the Sumo Association on April 19, 2010, with the judge saying, "It has been proven that urine samples which showed positive results for marijuana were theirs, and it is unthinkable that they were mixed up with samples of others... the association's decision to dismiss them was adequate given that the use of illegal drugs had become a serious social problem." The court's ruling was upheld by the Tokyo High Court on November 18, 2010.

== Career record ==
Rohō Yukio
Year	January Hatsu basho, Tokyo	March Haru basho, Osaka	May Natsu basho, Tokyo	July Nagoya basho, Nagoya	September Aki basho, Tokyo	November Kyūshū basho, Fukuoka
2002	x	x	(Maezumo)	West Jonokuchi #40; 7–0; Champion	East Jonidan #31; 7–0–P; Champion	West Sandanme #32; 6–1
2003	West Makushita #49; 5–2	West Makushita #33; 4–3	West Makushita #28; 5–2	East Makushita #16; 4–3	West Makushita #12; 5–2	East Makushita #5; 5–2
2004	West Jūryō #9; 11–4–PPP	West Jūryō #3; 6–9	West Jūryō #6; 10–5	East Jūryō #1; 10–5	East Maegashira #15; 10–5; F	West Maegashira #9; 10–5
2005	East Maegashira #5; 7–8	West Maegashira #6; 11–4	West Maegashira #1; 7–8	East Maegashira #3; 3–8–4	West Maegashira #10; 8–7	East Maegashira #8; 10–5
2006	East Maegashira #2; 9–6	East Komusubi #1; 4–11	West Maegashira #5; 8–7	East Maegashira #3; 8–5–2	West Maegashira #1; 10–5	West Komusubi #2; 8–7
2007	West Komusubi #1; 3–12	West Maegashira #7; 7–8	East Maegashira #9; 10–5	West Maegashira #3; 3–1–11	East Maegashira #9; 6–9	East Maegashira #12; 10–5
2008	East Maegashira #5; 7–8	East Maegashira #6; 6–9	West Maegashira #9; 8–6–1	East Maegashira #7; 9–6	Dismissed	x
Record given as wins–losses–absences Top division champion Top division runner-up Retired Lower divisions Non-participation Sanshō key: F=Fighting spirit; O=Outstanding performance; T=Technique Also shown: ★=Kinboshi; P=Playoff(s); Divisions: Makuuchi — Jūryō — Makushita — Sandanme — Jonidan — Jonokuchi Makuuchi ranks: Yokozuna — Ōzeki — Sekiwake — Komusubi — Maegashira

== See also ==
- Glossary of sumo terms
- List of non-Japanese sumo wrestlers
- List of past sumo wrestlers
- List of komusubi
