= Tachi-ai =

Sumo technique

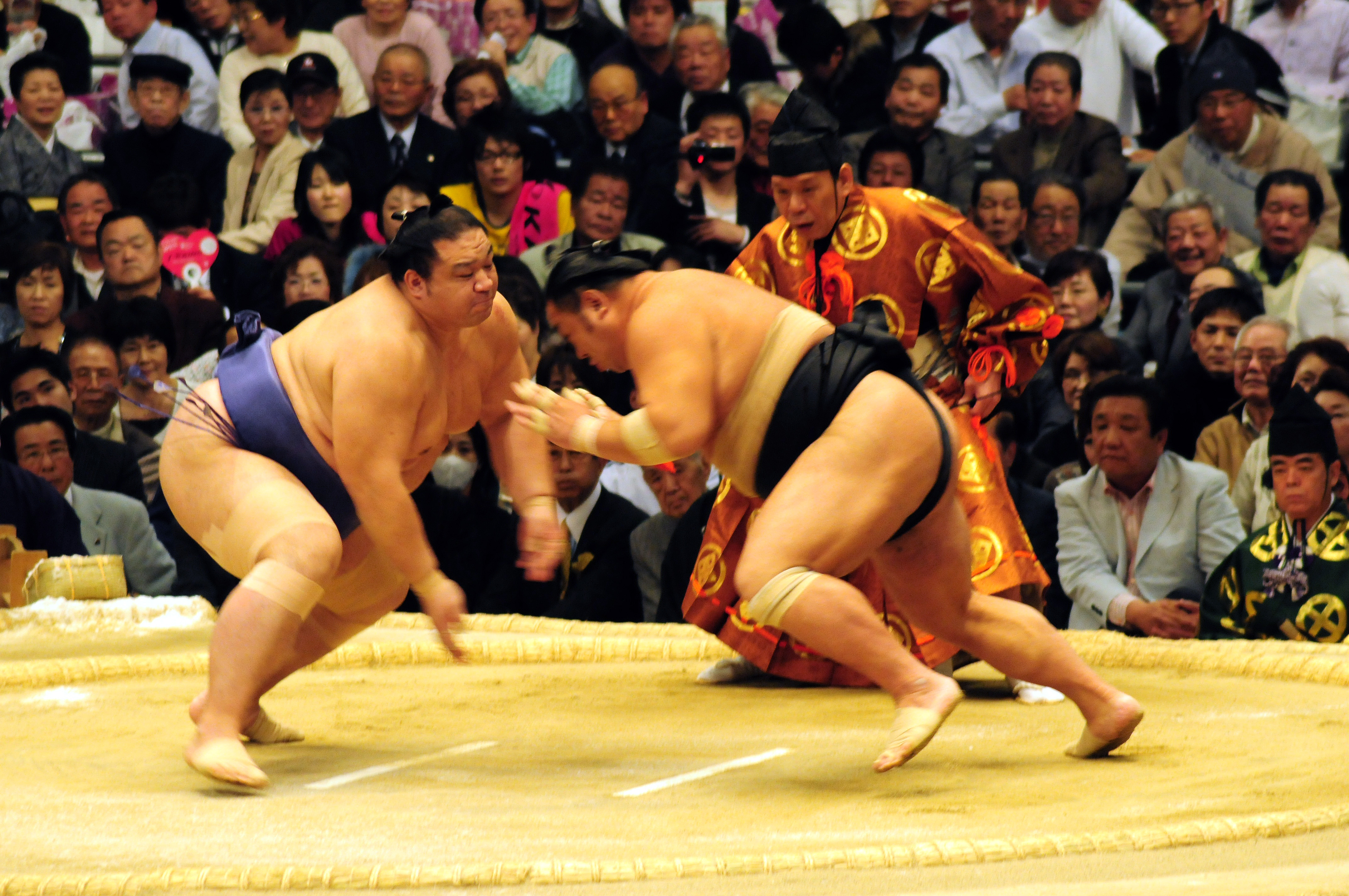
Kaiō and Chiyotaikai charging at each other at the tachi-ai (March 2009)

The tachi-ai (立合い) is the initial charge between two sumo wrestlers at the beginning of a bout. It is a combination of two Japanese words that mean “stand” and “meet”.

There are several common techniques that wrestlers use at the tachi-ai, with the aim of getting a decisive advantage in the bout:

Charge head-first
Usually to attempt to use one's weight and momentum to force the opponent backwards out of the ring. Such a headlong charge in a low position can lead a more agile opponent to dodge out of the way and slap the charger on the back to push him to his knees.
Try to raise the opponent up into a vertical position
Makes the opponent more vulnerable to being pushed backwards toward the ring edge and also to certain types of throw and pull down moves.
Thrust the opponent's chest
Again force the opponent backwards towards the ringedge, or to unbalance him sufficiently to execute a beltless arm throw or a pull down move. Powerful thrusts can on occasion be enough to force the opponent to fall over in the ring.
Slap the opponent's face
Shock the opponent into lowering his guard to gain an advantageous position, in certain cases the slap has been known to be enough to stun an opponent into falling to his knees.
Grab the opponent's belt
Use the belt to gain leverage to force an opponent backwards, or to execute a belt throw
React to the opponent's move
Includes dodging out of the way of an incautious charge as described above (known as henka), or dodging the attempted slap and using the opponent's lack of balance to gain an advantageous position.
Jump over the opponent
Used famously by retired rikishi Hayateumi and Mainoumi, involves jumping high at the charge and hoping the opponent charges out of the ring.
Surprise the opponent
Includes such moves as clapping one hands in front of the opponent's face (nekodamashi) and using the momentary blink to duck underneath to get a strong belt or leg grip to try to subsequently throw the opponent. See also Henka.

The rules state that the wrestlers must touch down both fists on the floor before the tachi-ai. By the 1970s and early 1980s, the rule had come to be widely ignored, with wrestlers charging from a virtually standing position. A crackdown by the Japan Sumo Association in 1984 led to the fist-down rule being enforced once again, but has also led to concerns that it increases the likelihood of wrestlers charging head-first into each other and suffering concussion.
