= Chiyotaikai Ryūji =

Japanese sumo wrestler (born 1976)

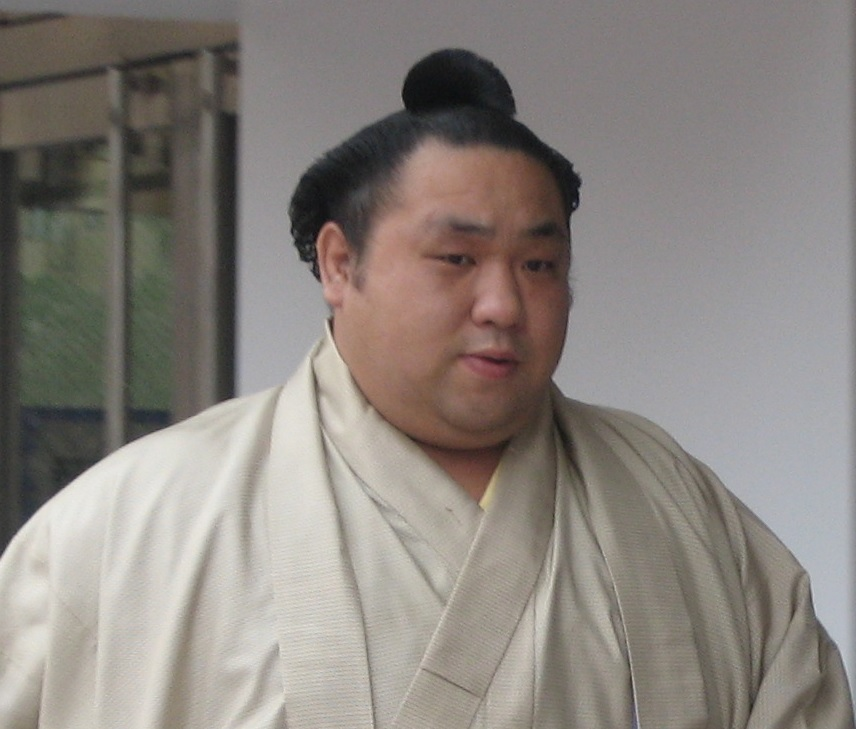

Personal information
- Native name: 千代大海 龍二
- Born: Ryūji Hiroshima (広島 龍二); April 29, 1976 (age 50) Chitose, Hokkaido, Japan
- Height: 1.81 m (5 ft 11 1/2 in)
- Weight: 158 kg (348 lb; 24.9 st)
- Website: http://ameblo.jp/chiyotaikai/

Sport
- Sport: Sumo
- Retired: January 2010
- Heya: Kokonoe
- Record: 771-524-115
- Debut: November 1992
- Highest rank: Ōzeki (March 1999)
- Elder name: Kokonoe
- Championships: 3 (Makuuchi); 2 (Jūryō); 1 (Sandanme); 1 (Jonokuchi)
- Special Prizes: Outstanding Performance (1); Fighting Spirit (1); Technique (3)
- Gold Stars: 1 (Takanohana II)
- Updated on Jan 2010

Ryūji Chiyotaikai (千代大海 龍二, Chiyotaikai Ryūji; born April 29, 1976) is a Japanese former sumo wrestler. He made his professional debut in 1992 and reached the top makuuchi division in 1997. He held the second highest rank of ōzeki or champion for 65 consecutive tournaments from 1999 until 2009, making him the longest serving ōzeki in the modern era.

He won three top division yūshō or tournament championships, and was a runner-up on seven other occasions. However, he also held the dubious record of being in danger of demotion from ōzeki fourteen times. He wrestled for Kokonoe stable until his retirement in January 2010 at the age of 33. He remained in sumo as a coach at Kokonoe stable, and became the head coach in August 2016 following the death of Chiyonofuji.

== Career ==
After his father's death, Chiyotaikai's family moved to Ōita, which is considered his hometown and listed as such on the banzuke ranking sheets. When he was eleven, his mother remarried, to a local businessman. (In May 2009, Chiyotaikai finally adopted his mother's remarried surname of Sudō as his own.) He was an enthusiastic player of baseball and football as well as martial arts. He excelled at karate, and in judo he came third in the All-Japan Middle School Judo Championships. However, he also got into fights and petty crime as a member of a gang of youths. After graduating junior high school, he worked as a construction worker before he decided on his mother's prompting to apprentice himself to Kokonoe-oyakata, the former Chiyonofuji, the 58th Yokozuna and one of the strongest wrestlers in sumo history, who managed the Kokonoe stable. Kokonoe initially refused the new wrestler because of his bleached hair and obliged him to get a haircut before allowing him to join.

Chiyotaikai was given his shikona (wrestler name) in honour of his stablemaster and joined professional sumo in November 1992 and became a sekitori in July 1995 upon entering the second highest jūryō division. He remained in jūryō for another two years, but after winning two jūryō championships in March and July 1997 he reached makuuchi, the top division. In May 1998, Chiyotaikai was made komusubi and never left the san'yaku ranks after that. He won the prestigious Technique Prize three times that year. In January 1999, he won his first top division championship, defeating yokozuna Takanohana and Wakanohana on the last two days, and Wakanohana once again in a play-off. He had compiled a three tournament record of 32–13, and he was promoted to ōzeki after the tournament, the first newcomer to the rank since Musashimaru and Takanonami five years earlier. Even though he had to bow out from his very first tournament that he fought as an ōzeki in March 1999 after breaking his nose, he retained his rank until November 2009. In July 2007 he broke Takanohana Kenshi's record of fifty tournaments at ōzeki rank, which had stood for over 25 years, and extended his record to 65 consecutive tournaments.

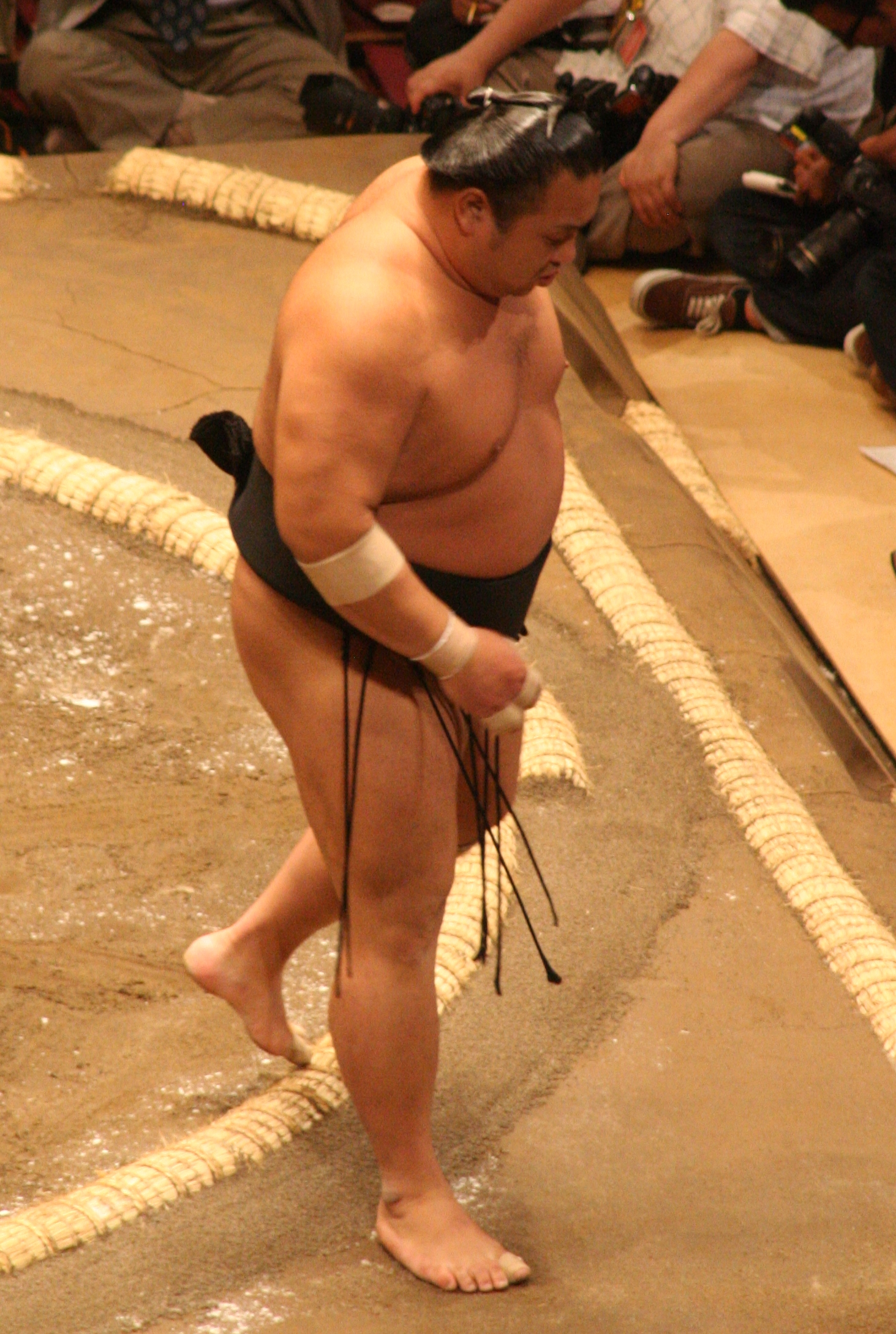
Chiyotaikai in May 2009

The reverse side of his longevity as an ōzeki was his inability to achieve promotion to yokozuna. After his first tournament win he performed at a rather mediocre level for some time; his next big success being the near-winner in the January tournament of 2002, where he lost a playoff to fellow ōzeki Tochiazuma having led going into the final day. After finishing as runner-up in May 2002 he then won his second championship in the next tournament in Nagoya. His first title since becoming an ozeki was achieved losing just one match, his best ever result. However, he was able to win only ten bouts in the next tournament, and following injury problems it took him until March 2003 to achieve his third and final tournament victory. After finishing as a runner-up in July 2003, September 2003 and March 2004, he struggled again until the November 2005 tournament where he was runner-up for the sixth time. After another lean couple of years, in November 2007 he was the tournament co-leader until the 14th day when he lost to Hakuhō. He injured his elbow during this match and had to default on the final day. He was still troubled by the injury in the January 2008 tournament and withdrew after losing his first seven bouts. He was never again to produce a winning score in double figures.

Chiyotaikai's 2–13 score in March 2009 was the worst record ever compiled by an ōzeki, and meant he was kadoban (in danger of demotion from ōzeki status) for a record thirteenth time in May. After bringing a 7–7 record into the final day's competition, he managed to win his last match and thereby return to full ōzeki status. He had been restricted by a left side ache and high blood sugar levels, and sat out the regional tour in April due to a fractured rib.

== Retirement ==
In September 2009 Chiyotaikai withdrew from the tournament after suffering eight defeats in the first ten days. He had an injury to his left knee in addition to his elbow problem, and commented, "I have no power to fight once I get in the ring." Kadoban for the fourteenth time in the Kyushu tournament in November, he won his first two bouts but then lost eight in a row, his demotion from ōzeki being confirmed on Day 10 when he was lifted out by Asashōryū. He withdrew from the tournament after this defeat, but announced that he would return at sekiwake rank in January to try to win necessary 10 bouts designated by the JSA that would allow him to regain his ōzeki status. He stated he would retire if he failed to achieve this.

After three straight losses in the January 2010 tournament, Chiyotaikai announced his retirement from sumo. His final match was against his longtime ōzeki rival Kaiō (who also broke the record for most makuuchi wins in this bout.) "I gave myself an ultimatum, so I don't have any regrets. I just don't have the power to continue wrestling my brand of sumo anymore," said Chiyotaikai. He remained as a coach at his stable under the toshiyori name of Sanoyama-oyakata. He had his danpatsu-shiki, or formal retirement ceremony, at the Ryōgoku Kokugikan on October 2, 2010. Shortly after the death of Chiyonofuji on July 31, 2016, Chiyotaikai was confirmed as the new head coach of Kokonoe stable, changing his name from Sanoyama to Kokonoe-oyakata.

In January 2021 he and several of his wrestlers tested positive for COVID-19. The whole of the Kokonoe stable sat out the New Year tournament.

In October 2023, Chiyotaikai was suspended after an underage makushita wrestler from his stable got drunk and had to be transferred to the hospital. He and the wrestlers involved in the drinking spree were subsequently expelled from the autumn tour. Nikkan Sports, quoting a source, later reported that Chiyotaikai berated the wrestler that was caught drinking, both in the hospital in Aichi where he had been transported and during a Sumo Association inquiry after returning to Tokyo. The source added that Chiyotaikai had punished the wrestler by making him do pushups for 30 minutes during sumo workout hours, and had banned the wrestler from going out for one year. A few days before the suspensions were announced, the wrestler was said to have run away from Kokonoe stable to return to his parents and had his top knot cut off at a barber shop.

== Fighting style ==
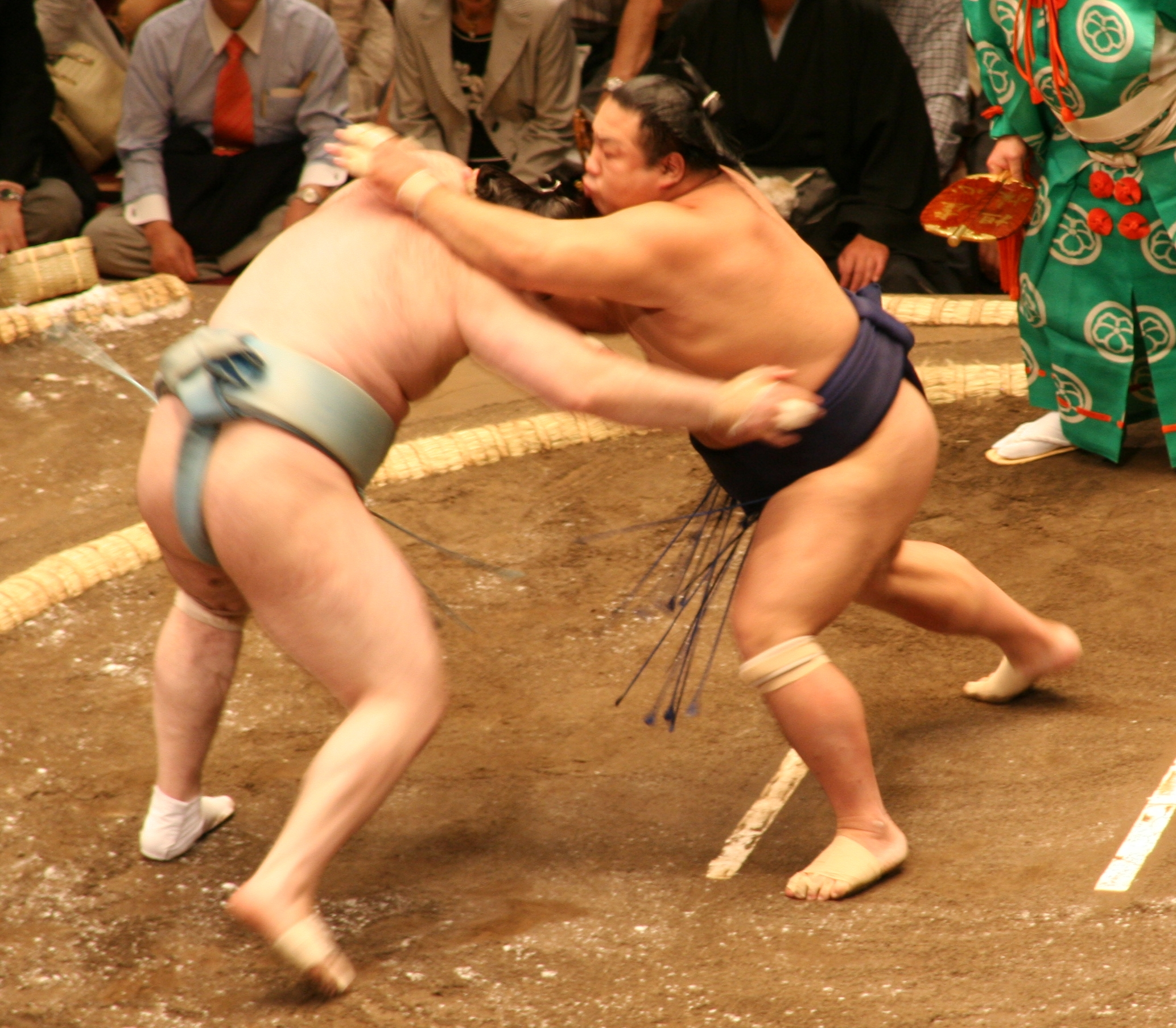
Chiyotaikai in action, May 2007.

Chiyotaikai was somewhat above average in size (1.81 m/158 kg), but was nonetheless a very agile fighter who preferred quick decisions by oshi-sumo. He was known mostly for his explosive charge at the beginning of his matches (the tachi-ai) and his trademark barrage of forward thrusting hand-slaps (tsuppari). Indeed, he was so famous for them that he was sometimes criticized by sumo fans for being a "one-trick pony." If Chiyotaikai's opponents managed to grab hold of his mawashi, he usually lost the match.

His most common winning kimarite was oshi-dashi, which accounted for roughly a third of his wins. He also regularly used hataki-komi, the slap down, and tsuki-dashi, the thrust out. Only around five percent of his victories were achieved by yori-kiri, the most common overall technique in sumo.

== Personal life ==
Chiyotaikai's paternal grandfather is of Taiwanese descent.

From 2003 until 2005 Chiyotaikai had a relationship with television personality Hikaru Kawamura. His stablemaster reportedly refused to countenance any wedding until he had reached the yokozuna rank. However, in a TV appearance with Kazuko Hosoki in 2007 Chiyotaikai indicated that he was seriously looking for a bride.

== Career record ==
Chiyotaikai Ryūji
Year	January Hatsu basho, Tokyo	March Haru basho, Osaka	May Natsu basho, Tokyo	July Nagoya basho, Nagoya	September Aki basho, Tokyo	November Kyūshū basho, Fukuoka
1992	x	x	x	x	x	(Maezumō)
1993	East Jonokuchi #47; 7–0; Champion	West Jonidan #43; 2–5	West Jonidan #74; 6–1	East Jonidan #6; 5–2	West Sandanme #68; 5–2	East Sandanme #40; 5–2
1994	West Sandanme #15; 7–0–P; Champion	East Makushita #12; 4–3	East Makushita #7; 3–4	West Makushita #13; 3–4	East Makushita #22; 5–2	West Makushita #14; 4–3
1995	East Makushita #10; 4–3	East Makushita #6; 6–1	East Makushita #1; 4–3	West Jūryō #13; 8–7	East Jūryō #12; 8–7	East Jūryō #10; 6–9
1996	East Jūryō #12; 9–6	West Jūryō #9; 8–7	East Jūryō #6; 8–7	West Jūryō #2; 5–10	East Jūryō #6; 8–7	West Jūryō #3; 11–4
1997	East Jūryō #1; 2–13	East Jūryō #9; 11–4; Champion	West Jūryō #1; 9–6	East Jūryō #1; 11–4; Champion	West Maegashira #11; 8–7	East Maegashira #5; 6–9
1998	East Maegashira #8; 9–6	East Maegashira #1; 8–7; T★	East Komusubi #1; 8–7	West Sekiwake #1; 11–4; T	East Sekiwake #1; 9–6; T	East Sekiwake #1; 10–5
1999	East Sekiwake #1; 13–2–P; FO	West Ōzeki #1; 3–8–4	West Ōzeki #2; Sat out due to injury 0–0–15	West Ōzeki #1; 10–5	East Ōzeki #1; 10–5	East Ōzeki #1; 9–6
2000	West Ōzeki #1; 9–6	West Ōzeki #1; 8–7	East Ōzeki #2; 11–4	East Ōzeki #1; 11–4	East Ōzeki #1; 10–5	West Ōzeki #1; 9–6
2001	West Ōzeki #1; 2–2–11	East Ōzeki #3; Sat out due to injury 0–0–15	East Ōzeki #3; 12–3	East Ōzeki #1; 11–4	West Ōzeki #1; 4–5–6	West Ōzeki #1; Sat out due to injury 0–0–15
2002	East Ōzeki #2; 13–2–P	West Ōzeki #1; 7–8	West Ōzeki #2; 11–4	West Ōzeki #1; 14–1	East Ōzeki #1; 10–5	West Ōzeki #1; 6–3–6
2003	West Ōzeki #2; Sat out due to injury 0–0–15	East Ōzeki #2; 12–3	East Ōzeki #1; 10–5	West Ōzeki #1; 11–4	West Ōzeki #1; 11–4	East Ōzeki #1; 10–5
2004	West Ōzeki #1; 10–5	East Ōzeki #1; 13–2	East Ōzeki #1; 9–6	West Ōzeki #1; 10–5	West Ōzeki #1; 8–7	West Ōzeki #1; 7–8
2005	West Ōzeki #1; 8–7	East Ōzeki #1; 6–9	West Ōzeki #2; 10–5	East Ōzeki #1; 3–6–6	West Ōzeki #2; 10–5	West Ōzeki #1; 11–4
2006	East Ōzeki #1; 4–4–7	East Ōzeki #2; 9–6	East Ōzeki #2; 10–5	West Ōzeki #1; 9–6	West Ōzeki #1; 10–5	East Ōzeki #1; 9–6
2007	West Ōzeki #2; 10–5	East Ōzeki #1; 7–8	West Ōzeki #3; 10–5	West Ōzeki #1; 9–6	East Ōzeki #1; 9–6	West Ōzeki #1; 11–4
2008	East Ōzeki #1; 0–8–7	West Ōzeki #2; 8–7	East Ōzeki #2; 5–10	West Ōzeki #2; 9–6	West Ōzeki #2; 9–6	East Ōzeki #2; 8–7
2009	West Ōzeki #1; 8–7	West Ōzeki #1; 2–13	East Ōzeki #3; 8–7	East Ōzeki #3; 8–7	East Ōzeki #3; 2–9–4	East Ōzeki #3; 2–9–4
2010	West Sekiwake #1; Retired; 0–4	x	x	x	x	x
Record given as wins–losses–absences Top division champion Top division runner-up Retired Non-participation Jūryō Lower divisions Sanshō key: F=Fighting spirit; O=Outstanding performance; T=Technique Also shown: ★=Kinboshi; P=Playoff(s); Divisions: Makuuchi — Jūryō — Makushita — Sandanme — Jonidan — Jonokuchi Makuuchi ranks: Yokozuna — Ōzeki — Sekiwake — Komusubi — Maegashira

== See also ==
- Glossary of sumo terms
- List of sumo elders
- List of past sumo wrestlers
- List of non-Japanese sumo wrestlers
- List of sumo record holders
- List of sumo top division champions
- List of sumo top division runners-up
- List of sumo second division champions
- List of ōzeki
