= Kaidō Yasuhiro =

Japanese former sumo wrestler

Personal information
- Native name: 魁道 康弘
- Born: Yasuhiro Tanaka; October 24, 1975 (age 50) Tokyo, Japan
- Height: 1.78 m (5 ft 10 in)
- Weight: 152 kg (335 lb; 23.9 st)

Sport
- Sport: Sumo
- University team: Chuo University
- Retired: September, 2006
- Heya: Tomozuna
- Record: 222-201-22
- Debut: March, 1998
- Highest rank: Jūryō 4 (May, 2004)
- Updated on June 2020

Kaidō Yasuhiro (魁道 康弘) (born October 24, 1975, as Yasuhiro Tanaka (田中 康弘, Tanaka Yasuhiro)) is a former sumo wrestler from Fuchu, Tokyo, Japan. His highest rank was jūryō 4. He was a member of the Tomozuna stable, and he was a tsukebito or personal attendant to ōzeki Kaiō for a number of years, as well as a frequent training partner of Sentoryū. He retired in 2006.

== Career ==
As a child he played baseball. Kaidō went to Meiji Nakano High School where he was a year senior of Tochiazuma, and he was named the High School Yokozuna in 1990. He was an amateur sumo champion at Chuo University before making his professional debut in March 1998, at the bottom of the third highest makushita division as a makushita tsukedashi entrant. He initially fought under the shikona of Tanaka, before changing to Kaito and then Kaidō (the character "Kai" being a common one in his stable or heya). He never made the top makuuchi division, but he spent 11 tournaments in the second highest jūryō division, which he first reached in 2003, reaching a high of jūryō 4. He was demoted to makushita in May 2005 and never made his way back. For many years he was a training partner to Sentoryū, as the two were the second and third most senior members of the Tomozuna stable behind longtime ōzeki Kaiō. Kaidō served as Kaiō's tsukebito or personal assistant when he was in the lower ranks and credited his senior stablemate for encouraging him when he was struggling with injuries.

== Retirement from sumo ==
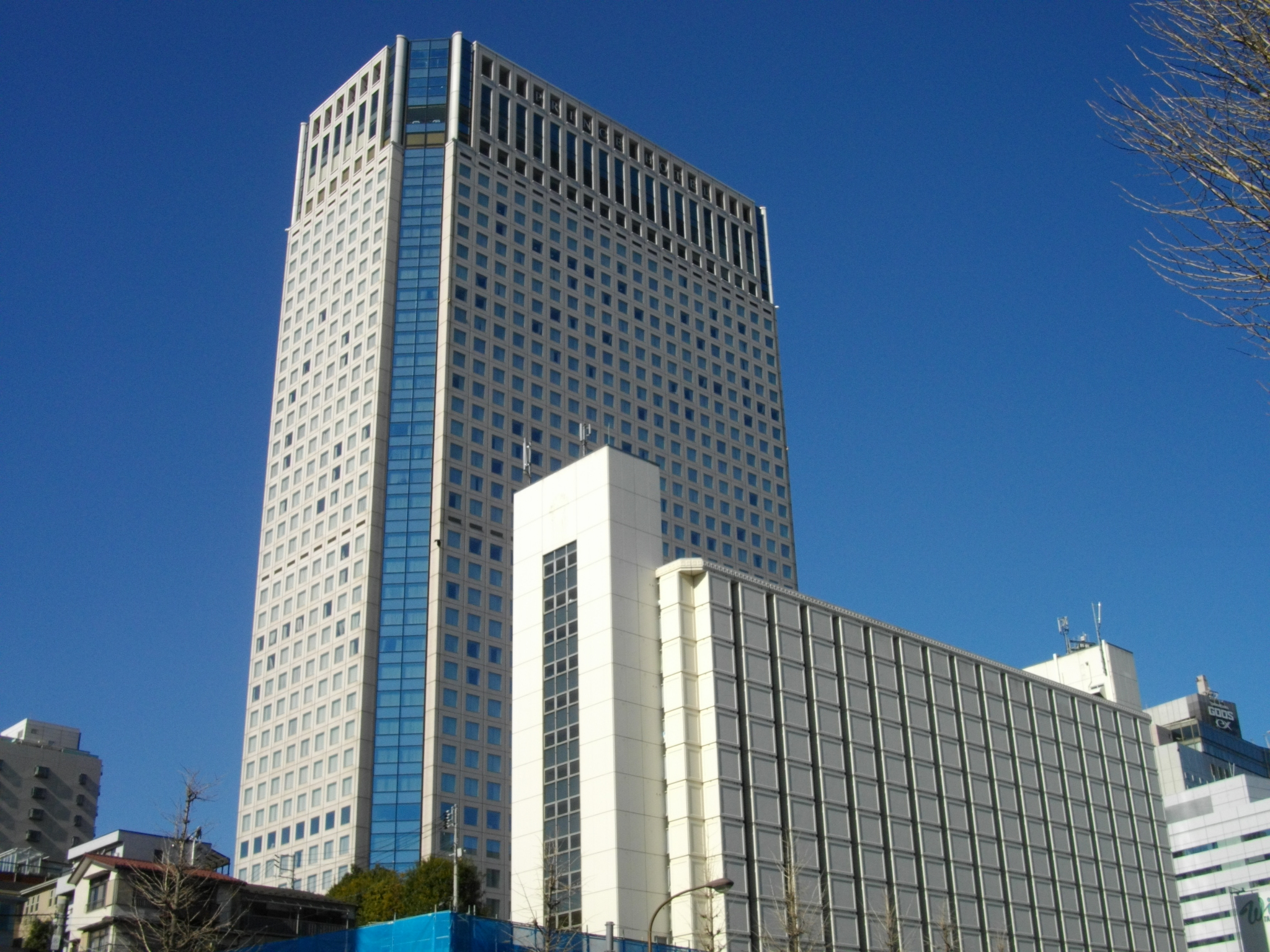
Kaidō had his retirement ceremony at the Shinagawa Prince Hotel in Tokyo.

He announced his retirement on August 18, 2006. He had been injury-prone throughout his career, suffering a number of knee injuries, although diabetes was the major factor in his decision. His danpatsu-shiki or official retirement ceremony was held in the Shinagawa Prince hotel in Takanawa, Tokyo on October 15, 2006. In 2007 he began running a yakiniku restaurant called "Sakigo" in Ogawamachi, Tokyo.

== Fighting style ==
Kaidō's favourite techniques were hidari-yotsu, a right hand outside, left hand inside grip on the opponent's mawashi, and yori-kiri (force out). He also regularly used uwate-nage, or overarm throw, and like Kaiō was keen on arm grabs such as tottari and kote-nage.

== Career record ==
Kaidō Yasuhiro
Year	January Hatsu basho, Tokyo	March Haru basho, Osaka	May Natsu basho, Tokyo	July Nagoya basho, Nagoya	September Aki basho, Tokyo	November Kyūshū basho, Fukuoka
1998	x	Makushita tsukedashi #60; 6–1	West Makushita #32; 3–4	West Makushita #41; 3–4	East Makushita #50; 2–5	West Sandanme #13; 5–2
1999	West Makushita #50; 5–2	West Makushita #33; 5–2	West Makushita #19; 3–4	West Makushita #25; 4–3	East Makushita #18; 4–3	East Makushita #14; 4–3
2000	West Makushita #10; 4–3	East Makushita #6; 3–4	East Makushita #11; 6–1	East Makushita #4; 2–5	West Makushita #14; 5–2	West Makushita #6; 3–4
2001	East Makushita #11; 6–1	West Makushita #1; 3–4	West Makushita #4; 4–3	East Makushita #3; 0–1–6	East Makushita #38; Sat out due to injury 0–0–7	East Makushita #38; 5–2
2002	East Makushita #22; 5–2	West Makushita #14; 4–3	West Makushita #12; 4–3	West Makushita #8; 4–1–2	West Makushita #4; Sat out due to injury 0–0–7	West Makushita #4; 3–4
2003	West Makushita #9; 4–3	West Makushita #5; 5–2	West Jūryō #13; 7–8	East Makushita #1; 5–2	West Jūryō #10; 9–6	West Jūryō #6; 5–10
2004	East Jūryō #8; 8–7	West Jūryō #4; 8–7	East Jūryō #4; 4–11	East Jūryō #10; 6–9	East Jūryō #13; 10–5	West Jūryō #8; 6–9
2005	East Jūryō #11; 6–9	West Jūryō #14; 7–8	East Makushita #1; 3–4	East Makushita #3; 1–6	East Makushita #22; 2–5	West Makushita #39; 4–3
2006	East Makushita #31; 4–3	West Makushita #25; 4–3	East Makushita #15; 4–3	West Makushita #11; 4–3	West Makushita #9; Retired –	x
Record given as wins–losses–absences Top division champion Top division runner-up Retired Lower divisions Non-participation Sanshō key: F=Fighting spirit; O=Outstanding performance; T=Technique Also shown: ★=Kinboshi; P=Playoff(s); Divisions: Makuuchi — Jūryō — Makushita — Sandanme — Jonidan — Jonokuchi Makuuchi ranks: Yokozuna — Ōzeki — Sekiwake — Komusubi — Maegashira

== See also ==
- Glossary of sumo terms
- List of past sumo wrestlers
