= Kyokukaiyū Ren =

Japanese sumo wrestler

Personal information
- Native name: 旭海雄 蓮
- Born: Shagdarsuren Dalaibaatar; April 4, 2000 (age 26) Bayankhongor, Mongolia
- Height: 1.83 m (6 ft 0 in)
- Weight: 165 kg (364 lb; 26.0 st)

Sport
- Sport: Sumo
- Rank: see below
- University team: Nippon Sport Science University
- Heya: Ōshima
- Debut: November 2023
- Highest rank: Maegashira 16 (November 2026)
- Championships: 1 Sandanme
- Updated on 28 July 2026

Kyokukaiyū Ren (Japanese: 旭海雄 蓮), born April 4, 2000 as Shagdarsuren Dalaibaatar (Mongolian: Шагдарсүрэн Далайбаатар) is a Mongolian professional sumo wrestler from Bayankhongor. He wrestles for Ōshima stable. He has won a sandanme division championship. Kyokukaiyū's highest rank is maegashira 16.

== Early life and sumo background ==
Kyokukaiyū was recruited to Asahigaoka High School, and was one of the first international students there, along with Ōnokatsu. During his second year of high school, he placed third in the National High School Sumo Selection Tournament. In his third year, Kyokukaiyū placed third at the Kanto Tournament's open weight division.

After finishing high school, Kyokukaiyū attended Nippon Sport Science University. He continued pursuing sumo, placing third at the East Japan Rookie Tournament in his first year, third at the +135 kg division of the East Japan Collegiate Weight-Class Tournament and top 8 at the All Japan Sumo Championship during his second year, and top 16 at the National Student Sumo Championship during his fourth year. Upon graduating university, Kyokukaiyū joined Ōshima stable.

== Career ==
Kyokukaiyū competed at the November 2023 tournament in maezumo. He entered the jonokuchi division in January 2024. He succeeded in his first two official tournaments, and was promoted to sandanme for the May 2024 tournament. In the May 2024 tournament, Kyokukaiyū won all seven rounds and placed first, winning the sandanme yusho. He was promoted to makushita for the July 2024 tournament. He reached the rank of makushita 8 for the November tournament, but finished with a record of 3-4, the first makekoshi (losing record), of his career. Kyokukaiyū's performance soon recovered, and he was promoted to juryo for the September 2025 tournament, making him the first rikishi from Ōshima stable to reach the juryo division under the stablemaster Oshima Oyakata (former sekiwake Kyokutenho). However, his 6-9 losing record in the September 2025 tournament saw him demoted back to makushita. Kyokukaiyū had a 5-2 record in the November 2025 tournament, and was promoted back to juryo for the January 2026 tournament, where he achieved a strong 10-5 record. He continued to maintain a winning record until the July 2026 tournament, where he had a 7-8 record.

Kyokukaiyū's shikona was given to him by his stablemaster, Oshima Oyakata (former sekiwake Kyokutenho). It incorporates kyoku (旭), a character shared by his stablemaster and many of his stablemates. Kai (海) (sea) and yū (雄) (heroic/male) are a reference to his birth name, 'Dalaibaatar', which means 'hero of the sea' in Mongolian. The second part of Kyokukaiyū's name, Ren (蓮), is the same name as the stablemaster's eldest son.

== Career record ==
Kyokukaiyū Ren
| Year | January Hatsu basho, Tokyo | March Haru basho, Osaka | May Natsu basho, Tokyo | July Nagoya basho, Nagoya | September Aki basho, Tokyo | November Kyūshū basho, Fukuoka |
|---|---|---|---|---|---|---|
| 2023 | x | x | x | x | x | (Maezumō) |
| 2024 | East Jonokuchi #15; 6–1 | West Jonidan #32; 5–2 | West Sandanme #87; 7–0; Champion | East Makushita #58; 6–1 | West Makushita #28; 6–1 | East Makushita #8; 3–4 |
| 2025 | East Makushita #16; 5–2 | East Makushita #9; 5–2 | East Makushita #5; 5–2 | East Makushita #1; 5–2 | East Jūryō #13; 6–9 | West Makushita #1; 5–2 |
| 2026 | West Jūryō #12; 10–5 | West Jūryō #7; 9–6 | East Jūryō #4; 9–6 | West Jūryō #1; 7–8 | West Jūryō #1; 8–7 | West Maegashira #16; 8–7 |
Record given as wins–losses–absences Top division champion Top division runner-up Retired Non-participation Jūryō Lower divisions Sanshō key: F=Fighting spirit; O=Outstanding performance; T=Technique Also shown: ★=Kinboshi; P=Playoff(s); Divisions: Makuuchi — Jūryō — Makushita — Sandanme — Jonidan — Jonokuchi Makuuchi ranks: Yokozuna — Ōzeki — Sekiwake — Komusubi — Maegashira

== See also ==
- Glossary of sumo terms
- List of active sumo wrestlers
- List of Mongolian sumo wrestlers
- List of non-Japanese sumo wrestlers
