= Kaiki Nobuhide =

Japanese sumo wrestler

Personal information
- Native name: 魁輝 薫秀
- Born: Masaaki Nishino; 12 June 1952 (age 74) Aomori, Japan
- Height: 1.82 m (5 ft 11 1/2 in)
- Weight: 148 kg (326 lb)

Sport
- Sport: Sumo
- Retired: March 1987
- Heya: Tomozuna
- Record: 744–790–25
- Debut: September 1965
- Highest rank: Sekiwake (July 1979)
- Elder name: Tomozuna
- Special Prizes: Fighting Spirit (1)
- Gold Stars: 3 Kitanoumi; Wakanohana II; Takanosato
- Updated on July 2008

Kaiki Nobuhide (born 12 June 1952 as Masaaki Nishino) is a former sumo wrestler from Tenmabayashi, Aomori, Japan. He made his professional debut in 1965, and was promoted to the top makuuchi division in 1975. He earned three gold stars for defeating yokozuna and one special prize. His highest rank was sekiwake, which he reached in July 1979. He retired in 1987 and was the head coach of the Tomozuna stable from 1989 until 2017, training ōzeki Kaiō among others. He was also a Director of the Japan Sumo Association. In 2017 he was re-hired by the Sumo Association as a consultant after retiring as head coach.

== Career ==
Making his debut in September 1965 at the age of just 13, he stood at only 1.70 m (5 ft 7 in) and weighed just 90 kg (200 lb). He initially fought under his own surname of Nishino, becoming Nishinishiki in 1973. In September 1973 he became a fully fledged sekitori, and he adopted the ring name of Kaiki in 1975. He eventually reached the top makuuchi division in November 1975, ten years after his debut but still aged only 23. He fought in the top makuuchi division for 66 tournaments in total and earned three gold stars for defeating yokozuna. He earned one sanshō or special prize, which came in his debut tournament at the rank of komusubi in May 1979 when he shared the Fighting Spirit Award with Ōzutsu. He was promoted to sekiwake for the following tournament in July 1979. Although he scored only three wins against twelve losses in what was to be his only tournament at sekiwake, two of those wins were against yokozuna Kitanoumi and ōzeki Asahikuni. He made the san'yaku ranks twice more, in July 1980 and January 1981, but on both occasions had a make-koshi or losing record at komusubi. He fought in the maegashira ranks until November 1986 when he was demoted to the jūryō division. He retired two tournaments later after the March 1987 honbasho.

== Retirement from sumo ==
Upon his retirement he became an elder of the Japan Sumo Association under the name Takashima Oyakata, working as a coach. He recruited Kaiō in March 1988, whom he had been aware of when he was still an active wrestler. He became head of the Tomozuna stable in May 1989 upon the mandatory retirement of the previous head, former jūryō Ichinishiki (who was also his father-in-law). In 1993 Kaiō reached the top division, and became an ōzeki in 2000. In 2006 Tomozuna Oyakata became a Director on the board of the Sumo Association, initially in charge of the Education department and running the sumo school. He continued to produce top level wrestlers, with Kaisei reaching the top division in 2011. In April 2012 Tomozuna stable absorbed Ōshima stable when its stablemaster retired. Kyokutenhō then immediately won the top division championship in May 2012, giving Tomozuna stable another championship to go with the five won by Kaiō.

In an interview in 2006 Tomozuna criticized his former wrestler Sentoryū, and yokozuna Akebono, who both moved into mixed martial arts, for continuing to use their traditional ring names outside of the sumo world.

In June 2017 he passed on ownership of the Tomozuna name to the former Kyokutenhō and retired from his head coach role upon reaching 65 years of age, although he was re-hired as a consultant on reduced pay for a period of five years. He went back to the Tomozuna name in February 2022 when Tomozuna stable was renamed Ōshima stable.

Tomozuna's consultancy role expired upon his 70th birthday in June 2022, ending his 57-year stay in the Japan Sumo Association.

== Personal life ==
His son, Kuniaki, was born in 1979 and in 1995 entered sumo himself. He was known as Kaishoryū and retired in 2010, having never achieved sekitori status. His highest rank was makushita 6.

== Career record ==
Kaiki Nobuhide
Year	January Hatsu basho, Tokyo	March Haru basho, Osaka	May Natsu basho, Tokyo	July Nagoya basho, Nagoya	September Aki basho, Tokyo	November Kyūshū basho, Fukuoka
1965	x	x	x	x	(Maezumo)	West Jonokuchi #26; 2–2–3
1966	East Jonokuchi #17; 2–5	West Jonokuchi #9; 3–4	East Jonokuchi #4; 3–4	East Jonokuchi #2; 3–4	West Jonokuchi #1; 5–2	East Jonidan #39; 4–3
1967	West Jonidan #9; 5–2	West Sandanme #73; 3–4	East Jonidan #38; 2–5	East Jonidan #60; 4–3	West Jonidan #23; 4–3	West Sandanme #98; 5–2
1968	West Sandanme #65; 2–5	East Sandanme #84; 6–1	East Sandanme #46; 4–3	East Sandanme #37; 3–4	East Sandanme #51; 4–3	West Sandanme #36; 2–5
1969	East Sandanme #51; 5–2	East Sandanme #28; 2–5	West Sandanme #46; 4–3	East Sandanme #31; 5–2	East Sandanme #1; 4–3	West Makushita #50; 5–2
1970	East Makushita #35; 4–3	East Makushita #30; 6–1	East Makushita #11; 1–6	East Makushita #30; 4–3	West Makushita #23; 3–4	West Makushita #30; 1–6
1971	East Makushita #57; 6–1	West Makushita #30; 4–3	West Makushita #24; 4–3	East Makushita #19; 4–3	West Makushita #16; 3–4	West Makushita #21; 4–3
1972	West Makushita #16; 4–3	East Makushita #12; 5–2	West Makushita #4; 2–5	East Makushita #16; 4–3	East Makushita #15; 5–2	West Makushita #7; 3–4
1973	West Makushita #13; 5–2	West Makushita #4; 4–3	East Makushita #2; 4–3	West Makushita #1; 4–3	West Jūryō #13; 9–6	West Jūryō #10; 7–8
1974	East Jūryō #11; 8–7	East Jūryō #9; 8–7	East Jūryō #6; 9–6	West Jūryō #1; 5–10	East Jūryō #6; 7–8	East Jūryō #9; 8–7
1975	West Jūryō #6; 6–9	West Jūryō #11; 8–7	East Jūryō #10; 8–7	West Jūryō #7; 8–7	East Jūryō #6; 10–5	East Maegashira #14; 5–10
1976	East Jūryō #4; 10–5	West Maegashira #14; 10–5	West Maegashira #4; 6–7–2	East Maegashira #8; 8–7	East Maegashira #6; 7–8	East Maegashira #7; 8–7
1977	East Maegashira #4; 5–10	East Maegashira #11; 10–5	West Maegashira #3; 5–10	West Maegashira #8; 9–6	East Maegashira #2; 3–12	East Maegashira #11; 10–5
1978	West Maegashira #5; 5–10	West Maegashira #9; 7–8	East Maegashira #12; 8–7	East Maegashira #9; 9–6	East Maegashira #3; 5–10	West Maegashira #9; 7–8
1979	East Maegashira #10; 8–7	East Maegashira #5; 10–5	East Komusubi #1; 8–7; F	East Sekiwake #1; 3–12	West Maegashira #8; 9–6	East Maegashira #3; 4–11 ★
1980	East Maegashira #11; 10–5	West Maegashira #1; 5–10	East Maegashira #5; 9–6	East Komusubi #1; 5–10	West Maegashira #3; 6–9	East Maegashira #5; 9–6
1981	West Komusubi #1; 3–12	East Maegashira #6; 3–7–5 ★	East Maegashira #12; Sat out due to injury 0–0–15	East Maegashira #12; 7–8	West Maegashira #12; 8–7	East Maegashira #9; 8–7
1982	East Maegashira #7; 5–10	East Maegashira #10; 8–7	East Maegashira #6; 8–7	East Maegashira #2; 5–10	West Maegashira #6; 8–7	West Maegashira #2; 7–8
1983	East Maegashira #4; 5–10	West Maegashira #8; 5–10	West Maegashira #12; 8–7	East Maegashira #7; 7–8	West Maegashira #9; 8–7	West Maegashira #3; 4–11
1984	West Maegashira #11; 8–7	East Maegashira #8; 5–10	West Maegashira #13; 9–6	East Maegashira #8; 8–7	East Maegashira #4; 7–8 ★	East Maegashira #6; 7–8
1985	West Maegashira #7; 7–8	West Maegashira #9; 7–8	East Maegashira #11; 7–8	East Maegashira #14; 8–7	East Maegashira #10; 8–7	East Maegashira #4; 5–10
1986	West Maegashira #11; 9–6	East Maegashira #6; 6–9	West Maegashira #11; 7–8	East Maegashira #13; 8–7	East Maegashira #11; 7–8	West Maegashira #12; 3–12
1987	East Jūryō #5; 8–7	East Jūryō #3; Retired; 4–11	x	x	x	x
Record given as wins–losses–absences Top division champion Top division runner-up Retired Lower divisions Non-participation Sanshō key: F=Fighting spirit; O=Outstanding performance; T=Technique Also shown: ★=Kinboshi; P=Playoff(s); Divisions: Makuuchi — Jūryō — Makushita — Sandanme — Jonidan — Jonokuchi Makuuchi ranks: Yokozuna — Ōzeki — Sekiwake — Komusubi — Maegashira

== See also ==
- Glossary of sumo terms
- List of past sumo wrestlers
- List of sumo elders
- List of sekiwake
