= Kaishō Asaki =

Japanese sumo wrestler

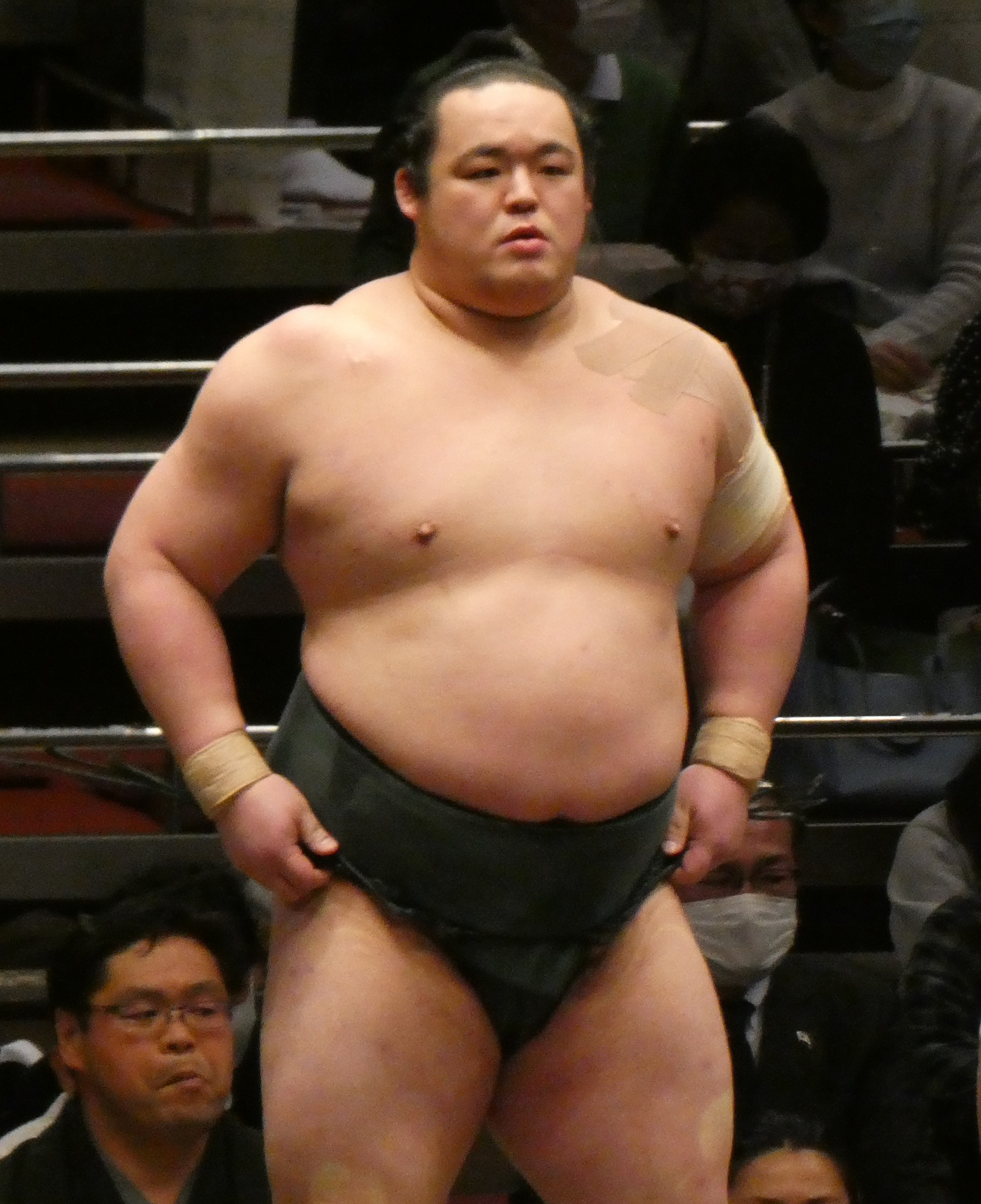

Personal information
- Native name: 魁勝 旦祈
- Born: Asaki Honda; January 28, 1995 (age 31) Aichi, Japan
- Height: 182 cm (5 ft 11 1/2 in)
- Weight: 155 kg (342 lb; 24 st 6 lb)

Sport
- Sport: Sumo
- Rank: See below
- Heya: Tomozuna→Asakayama
- Debut: March 2013
- Highest rank: Jūryō 2 (November 2021)
- Championships: 1 (Sandanme)
- Updated on 28 May 2023

Kaishō Asaki (Japanese: 魁勝 旦祈; born January 28, 1995 as Asaki Honda (本多 旦祈)) is a Japanese professional sumo wrestler from Nishio, Aichi Prefecture. He made his professional debut in March 2013, joining Tomozuna stable, and reached the jūryō division in September 2019. His highest rank has been jūryō 2. He has one sandanme division championship or yūshō.

== Early life ==
Asaki Honda was born in Nishio, a city located in Aichi Prefecture. He started practicing judo since his childhood being taught by his father. In his third year at Aichisangyodaigaku Mikawakoto High School he would rank second in the 100 kg weight division of the Aichi Prefectural tournament gaining him the nickname "Terminator of Mikawa". He would never compete in sumo before his debut, but was convinced by his cousin who had a connection with a Miyagino stable junior wrestler. After being introduced to Asakayama oyakata, the former ōzeki Kaiō and a member of the same ichimon, Honda would choose to forego university in favor of joining Tomozuna stable.

== Career ==
Honda would make his debut in March 2013 alongside future sekitori Endō, Daishōhō, Takagenji, and Takanofuji. Honda wrestled in maezumo with his surname, but switched to the shikona Kaishō following his jonokuchi debut. In January 2014 he would follow Asakayama oyakata who established a stable of the same name, being one of its founding disciples. After transferring, Kaishō would regularly train at Azumazeki stable, receiving peronalized training from former komusubi Takamisakari. Kaishō had a strong start, and breezed through the first two divisions with relative ease. He switched his shikona to Kaiseiō for the July 2014 tournament. After three straight kachi-koshi, or winning records in sandanme, Kaiseiō earned promotion to the makushita division for the May 2015 tournament.

Kaiseiō had a strong showing in his first two tournaments in makushita. He reached the upper-half of the division by his third tournament. However, for the May 2016 tournament, Kaiseiō had a right ankle surgery and had to miss out on every match. This result demoted him back to the sandanme division. Even though he wasn't completely healed, he still participated and finished with a 5–2 in the following July tournament. Kaiseiō became a makushita mainstay for around three years, with the exception of a couple tournaments in sandanme. In January 2018, Kaiseiō reverted to his old shikona of Kaishō and immediately won all seven matches in sandanme. He was placed in a playoff against Tochikodai, which he won as well. He spent the following tournaments in upper level makushita, and after a win against jūryō-ranked wrestler Arawashi, Kaishō earned promotion to the jūryō division for the September 2019 tournament following a 4–3 record at makushita 4. He was selected ahead of Wakamotoharu who had scored 5–2 at makushita 5, despite losing to Wakamotoharu during the tournament, a fact that his own stablemaster thought might count against him.

Kaisho was the first wrestler from Asakayama stable to earn sekitori status. In his jūryō debut, Kaishō lost his first three matches but, would bounce back and win 8 out of the 10 following matches. He lost his final three matches to finish with a decent 8–7 record. This promoted him to jūryō 11 for the November 2019, tournament. Kaishō struggled in the tournament and finished with a 5–10 record. This regulated him back to the makushita division, where he would remain for all of 2020. He would return to jūryō in July 2021 and posted a strong 11–4 record, which would include a win over Abi, ending the latter's 21-match winning streak since his return from suspension. He would follow this up with a 8–7 record in September. This would see him promoted up to jūryō 2 for the November tournament. A good tournament here would have seen him likely promoted to the top makuuchi division for the new year but, he would falter going 5–10 by the finish.

He was forced to withdraw from the July 2022 tournament on Day 12, with his score at 5–6, due to a COVID-19 outbreak at his stable.

== Fighting style ==
Kaishō is a yotsu-sumo wrestler, preferring grappling techniques to pushing and thrusting. His most common winning kimarite is a straightforward yori-kiri, or force out, and he uses a hidari-yotsu grip on the mawashi or belt, with his right hand outside and left hand inside his opponent's arms.

== Career record ==
Kaishō Asaki
Year	January Hatsu basho, Tokyo	March Haru basho, Osaka	May Natsu basho, Tokyo	July Nagoya basho, Nagoya	September Aki basho, Tokyo	November Kyūshū basho, Fukuoka
2013	x	(Maezumō)	West Jonokuchi #6; 4–3	East Jonidan #65; 3–4	West Jonidan #82; 6–1	West Jonidan #10; Sat out due to injury 0–0–7
2014	West Jonidan #80; Sat out due to injury 0–0–7	West Jonokuchi #11; 4–3	East Jonidan #65; 6–1	West Sandanme #92; 3–4	West Jonidan #13; 6–1	West Sandanme #51; 5–2
2015	West Sandanme #22; 4–3	East Sandanme #7; 4–3	West Makushita #56; 4–3	East Makushita #46; 5–2	West Makushita #29; 2–5	West Makushita #47; 4–3
2016	East Makushita #38; Sat out due to injury 0–1–6	West Sandanme #18; 5–2	West Makushita #56; 6–1	West Makushita #24; 4–3	West Makushita #18; 2–5	East Makushita #31; 0–7
2017	West Sandanme #6; 5–2	West Makushita #46; 5–2	West Makushita #35; 2–5	West Makushita #55; 5–2	East Makushita #37; 2–5	East Makushita #56; 3–4
2018	West Sandanme #8; 7–0; Champion	West Makushita #12; 2–5	West Makushita #26; 2–5	East Makushita #42; 4–3	East Makushita #34; 6–1	West Makushita #13; 5–2
2019	East Makushita #7; 4–3	East Makushita #4; 3–4	West Makushita #7; 4–3	West Makushita #4; 4–3	West Jūryō #14; 8–7	East Jūryō #11; 5–10
2020	East Makushita #1; 2–5	East Makushita #9; 4–3	East Makushita #6; Tournament Cancelled; State of Emergency; 0–0–0	East Makushita #6; 5–2	East Makushita #3; 5–2	East Makushita #7; 2–5
2021	West Makushita #13; 5–2	West Makushita #7; 5–2	West Makushita #2; 6–1	East Jūryō #13; 11–4	West Jūryō #4; 8–7	West Jūryō #2; 5–10
2022	East Jūryō #5; 8–7	West Jūryō #4; 5–10	East Jūryō #9; 7–8	East Jūryō #9; 5–7–3	West Jūryō #9; 7–8	West Jūryō #10; 5–10
2023	West Jūryō #13; 5–10	West Makushita #4; 3–4	West Makushita #9; 4–3	West Makushita #6; 4–3	East Makushita #3; 2–5	East Makushita #10; 1–6
2024	East Makushita #29; 4–3	West Makushita #23; 5–2	West Makushita #14; 4–3	West Makushita #9; 4–3	West Makushita #6; 4–3	West Makushita #3; 2–5
2025	West Makushita #15; 5–2	West Makushita #8; 2–5	East Makushita #22; 3–4	East Makushita #28; 3–4	East Makushita #38; 4–3	East Makushita #30; 3–3–1
2026	West Makushita #36; 2–5	East Makushita #57; 5–2	West Makushita #34; 3–4	East Makushita #44; 5–2	West Makushita #29; 2–5	East Makushita #45; 4–3
Record given as wins–losses–absences Top division champion Top division runner-up Retired Non-participation Jūryō Lower divisions Sanshō key: F=Fighting spirit; O=Outstanding performance; T=Technique Also shown: ★=Kinboshi; P=Playoff(s); Divisions: Makuuchi — Jūryō — Makushita — Sandanme — Jonidan — Jonokuchi Makuuchi ranks: Yokozuna — Ōzeki — Sekiwake — Komusubi — Maegashira

== See also ==
- Glossary of sumo terms
- List of active sumo wrestlers
