= Asakayama stable =

Stable of sumo wrestlers

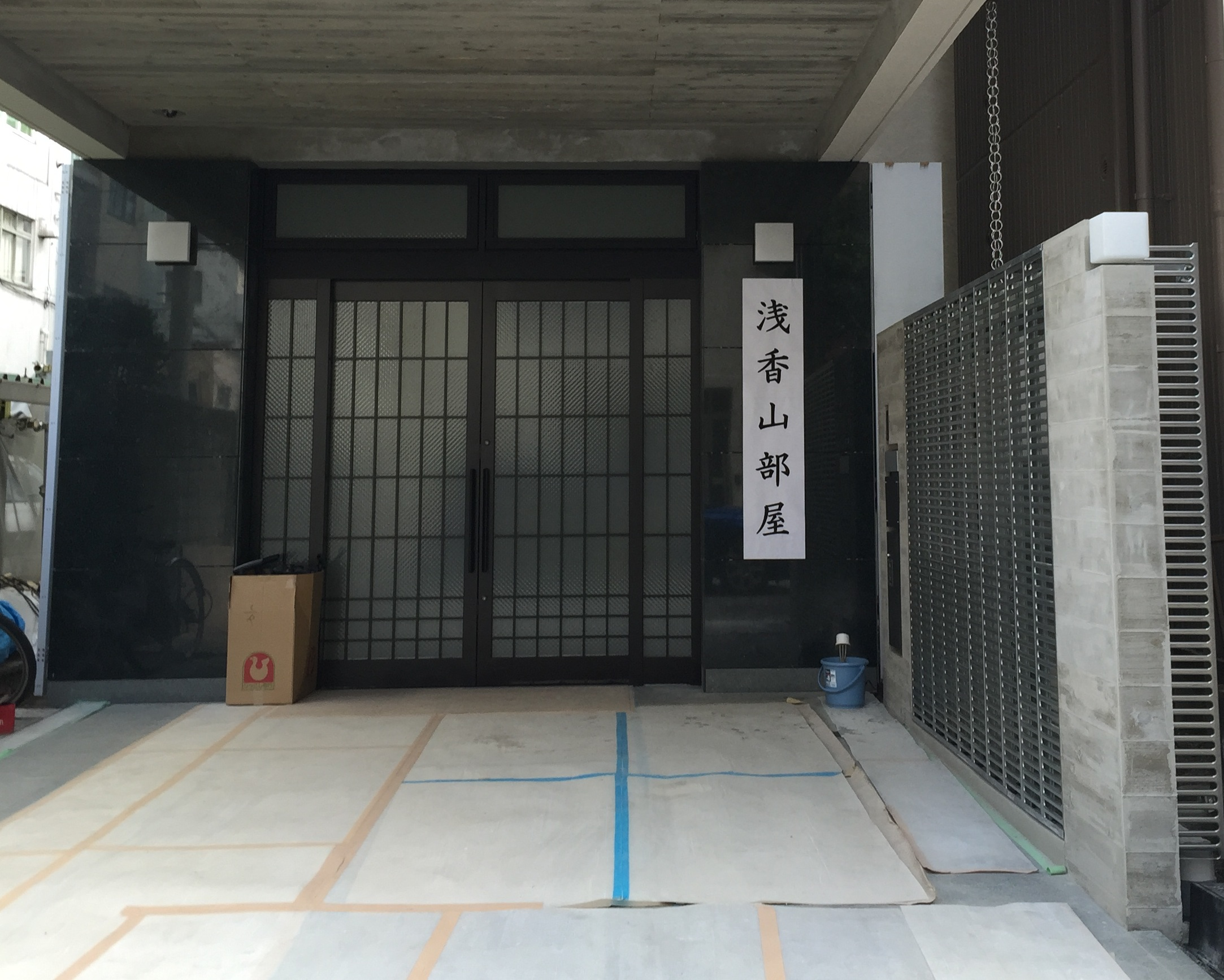

Asakayama stable (浅香山部屋, Asakayama-beya) is a stable of sumo wrestlers. Previous incarnations with this stable name have existed, with the last being headed by former yokozuna Nishinoumi, and which folded in 1933. The current incarnation is part of the Isegahama ichimon or group of stables. It was set up in February 2014 by former ōzeki Kaiō Hiroyuki (elder name Asakayama), who branched off from the Tomozuna stable. To begin with it had four wrestlers, two of whom he took with him from his former stable and two of whom were new recruits. In the May 2014 tournament, this stable had the distinction of being the only one where all of its wrestlers achieved kachi-koshi or a majority of wins. In September 2019 the stable produced its first sekitori in Kaishō, who was one of the transfers from Tomozuna stable. Kaito, the other Tomozuna transfer, won the makushita division championship in that tournament, but announced his retirement after the September 2020 tournament due to a neck injury. As of January 2023 it had nine wrestlers.

In September 2021 a 20-year-old member of the stable, Kaibushō, was arrested on charges of forcible indecency for soliciting nude images of an 11-year-old girl via LINE.

On 5 June 2023, Tomozuna (the former sekiwake Kaisei) transferred from Ōshima stable to Asakayama stable to serve as a coach.

As of May 2026, the stable has 12 active wrestlers.

== Owner ==
- 2014–present: 15th Asakayama (riji, former ōzeki Kaiō Hiroyuki, born 1972)

== Notable active wrestlers ==
- Kaishō (best rank, jūryō 2, born 1995)
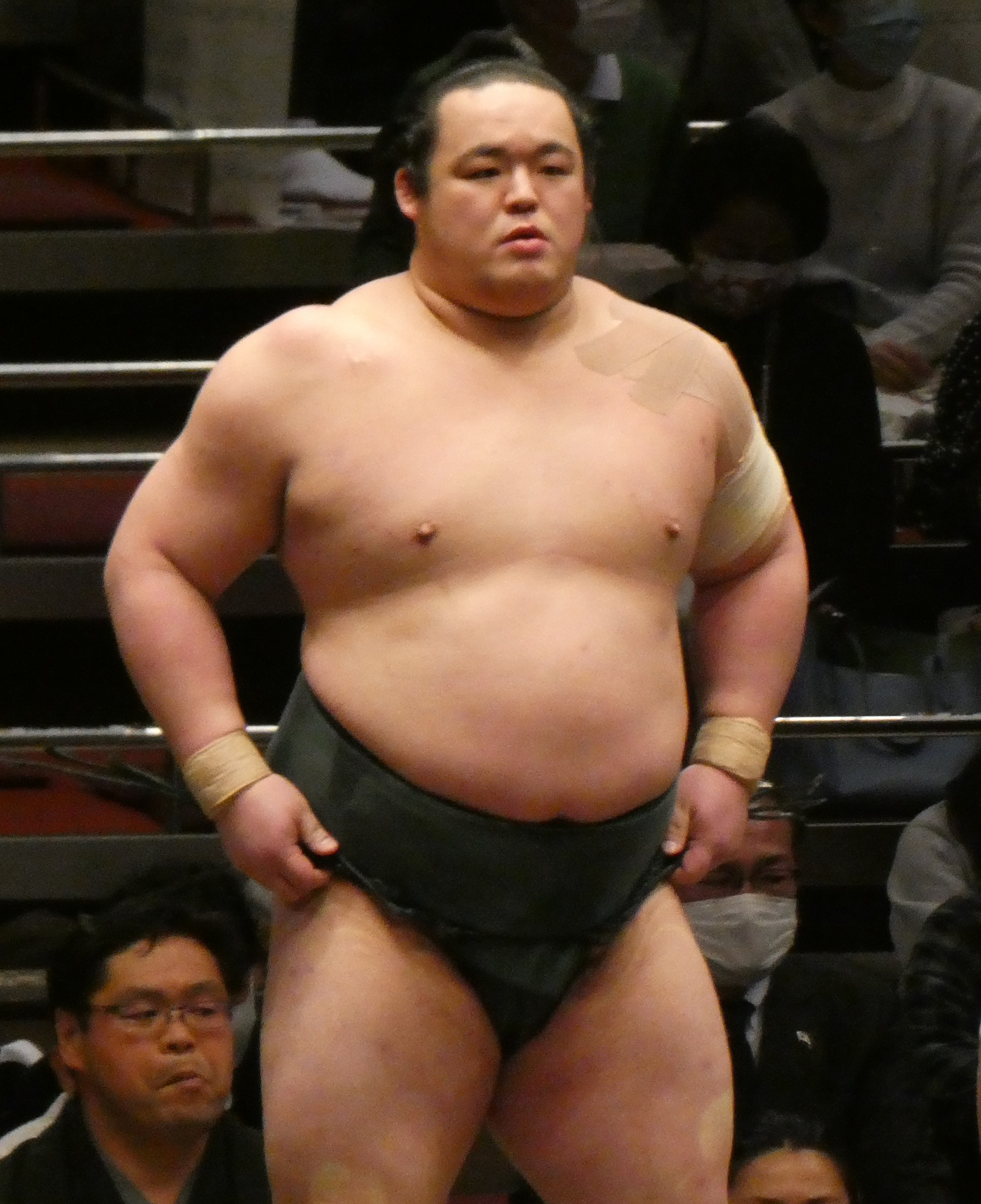
  Kaishō is the stable's first sekitori

== Coaches ==
- Tomozuna (shunin, former sekiwake Kaisei, born 1986)

== Usher ==
- Kōji (makuuchi yobidashi, real name Takuma Hatano, born 1973)

== Hairdresser ==
- Tokosei (first class tokoyama, born 1970)

== Location and access ==
Tokyo, Sumida Ward, Midori 4-2-1 9 minute walk from Kinshichō Station on Sōbu Line (Rapid), Chūō-Sōbu Line, and Tokyo Metro Hanzōmon Line.

== See also ==
- List of sumo stables
- List of active sumo wrestlers
- List of past sumo wrestlers
- Glossary of sumo terms
