= Sentoryū Henri =

Japanese martial artist (1969–2026)

Personal information
- Native name: 戦闘竜 扁利
- Born: Henry Armstrong Miller; July 16, 1969 Tokyo, Japan
- Died: January 29, 2026 (aged 56) Tokyo, Japan
- Height: 1.75 m (5 ft 9 in)
- Weight: 136 kg (300 lb)
- Website: http://ameblo.jp/sentoryu/

Sport
- Sport: Sumo
- Retired: November 2003
- Heya: Tomozuna
- Record: 403-303-99
- Debut: July 1988
- Highest rank: Maegashira 12 (September 2000)
- Championships: 1 (Makushita); 1 (Jonokuchi)
- Updated on May 26, 2026

Henry "Sentoryū" Miller
- Born: Henry Armstrong Miller; July 16, 1969; Tokyo, Japan
- Died: January 29, 2026 (aged 56); Tokyo, Japan
- Other names: Sentoryū
- Nationality: American; Japanese
- Height: 5 ft 9 in (175 cm)
- Weight: 300 lb (136 kg; 21 st 6 lb)
- Division: Super Heavyweight; Heavyweight
- Stance: Orthodox
- Fighting out of: Tokyo, Japan
- Team: Team Fighting Dragon
- Rank: Maegashira in Sumo
- Years active: 2004–2013

Kickboxing record
- Total: 3
- Wins: 1
- By knockout: 1
- Losses: 2
- By knockout: 2
- Draws: 0

Mixed martial arts record
- Total: 23
- Wins: 6
- By knockout: 5
- By submission: 1
- Losses: 16
- By knockout: 13
- By submission: 2
- By decision: 1
- Draws: 0
- No contests: 1

Other information
- Mixed martial arts record from Sherdog

Henry Armstrong Miller (July 16, 1969 – January 29, 2026), known under the shikona Sentoryū Henri (戦闘竜 扁利), was a Japanese professional sumo wrestler and MMA fighter, raised in St. Louis, Missouri. Sentoryū was the first wrestler from the United States mainland to reach the top makuuchi division.

Sentoryū made his professional debut in 1988 and reached a highest rank of maegashira 12 before retiring in 2003. He last competed in MMA in 2013, losing to Kazuhiro Nakamura.

== Early life ==
Henry Miller was born in Tachikawa, Tokyo, Japan, the son of a Japanese mother and African-American father. He was born on the same day that the Apollo 11 lunar mission left Earth and his middle name was given to him by his father in honor of Neil Armstrong. He lived on Yokota Air Base until the age of six, when he moved with his family to St Louis, Missouri. He grew up in Ferguson. His dream of becoming a professional football player was ended by a knee injury in his senior year of high school, but he had also been wrestling since elementary school and he had qualified for the state championships. After graduating in 1987 he returned to Japan to try professional sumo.

== Sumo career ==
Sentoryū joined the Tomozuna stable of wrestlers, also the home of future ozeki Kaio. He was given the shikona of Sentoryū, meaning "fighting war dragon" but also a play on words for his hometown of St. Louis. He was relatively small at 174 cm and 94 kg when he made his debut in July 1988. He won the yusho or tournament championship in his first tournament in the jonokuchi division in September 1988, defeating three others in a six-way playoff, including a fellow American, Shinnishiki from Los Angeles. In 1991 he reached makushita for the first time but injury problems meant he did not establish himself in the division until 1993. In November 1994 he became a sekitori for the first time but lasted only two tournaments in the jūryō division before being demoted.

It took Sentoryū more than four years of hard toil in the unsalaried makushita division (including a change of name to Kaishinzan in 1997) before he could win promotion back to the second division in July 1999, after an unbeaten 7–0 yusho in May. His final day victory over the former amateur champion Kototamiya (the future ozeki Kotomitsuki) was regarded as one of the high points of his career.

After reverting to the name Sentoryū, a strong 13–2 record in March 2000 sent him to the top of the jūryō division. With an 8–7 mark in May 2000, he finally achieved his goal of promotion to the top makuuchi division in July. It had taken him 72 tournaments from his professional debut to reach makuuchi, which is the slowest amongst foreign-born wrestlers.

Sentoryū came through with a winning record of 8–7 in his debut but was then demoted after only recording a 5–10 score in September 2000. He had to withdraw from the following tournament in November and missed the January 2001 basho. Nevertheless, he managed to hold his own in jūryō and had one more visit to the top division in January 2002. However, he suffered a serious injury and was unable to compete in the March and May 2002 tournaments, falling all the way back to makushita. He refused to give up and fought his way back to sekitori status in September 2003, becoming the fifth oldest wrestler to return to jūryō in the postwar era at 34 years, 1 month. However, another injury convinced him to retire at the end of the year, in the same tournament as Musashimaru. His great fighting spirit, despite all his injuries, won him many admirers. He had spent 20 tournaments as a sekitori, by far the most successful career by anyone from the contiguous United States.

He defeated Asashōryū in their only meeting in November 2000, when both were in the jūryō division. He also had three wins over Kotomitsuki in their four meetings.

=== Fighting style ===
Sentoryū favoured pushing and thrusting techniques, winning most of his matches by oshi dashi (push out), hatakikomi (slap down) or hikiotoshi (pull down).

== Mixed martial arts and kickboxing career ==
After his retirement from sumo, Sentoryū tried his luck at mixed martial arts. He was recommended for PRIDE in April 2004 by Chiyotaikai Ryūji, who saw Akebono Taro make such transition a year before.

He had six wins and sixteen losses in his first 23 fights. He styled himself Henry "Sentoryu" Miller. He made an agreement with World Victory Road and fought Yoshihiro Nakao. On December 25, 2010 he faced Yoichi Babaguchi (former sekiwake Wakashoyo) in the first ever K-1 kickboxing match between former sekitori. There was an edge to the match because Miller blamed Babaguchi for an injury he sustained in a sumo bout between the two in November 1994 (his debut juryo tournament). Miller won the match in the first round.

== Death ==
Sentoryū died at a hospital in Tokyo, on the night of January 29, 2026, at the age of 56. He suffered from serious lung disease in his later years.

== Sumo career record ==
Sentoryū Henri
Year	January Hatsu basho, Tokyo	March Haru basho, Osaka	May Natsu basho, Tokyo	July Nagoya basho, Nagoya	September Aki basho, Tokyo	November Kyūshū basho, Fukuoka
1988	x	x	x	(Maezumo)	East Jonokuchi #51; 6–1–PPP; Champion	West Jonidan #119; 4–3
1989	West Jonidan #89; 4–3	West Jonidan #59; 5–2	East Jonidan #22; 2–5	East Jonidan #56; Sat out due to injury 0–0–7	West Jonidan #126; 6–1	East Jonidan #52; 3–1–3
1990	West Jonidan #72; 5–2	East Jonidan #25; 6–1	West Sandanme #66; 6–1	East Sandanme #18; Sat out due to injury 0–0–7	East Sandanme #78; 5–2	East Sandanme #44; 6–1
1991	East Makushita #60; 1–2–4	West Sandanme #35; Sat out due to injury 0–0–7	West Sandanme #35; 6–1	East Makushita #55; 3–3–1	East Sandanme #6; Sat out due to injury 0–0–7	East Sandanme #6; 2–5
1992	West Sandanme #34; 2–5	West Sandanme #61; 5–2	West Sandanme #30; 4–3	West Sandanme #18; 3–4	East Sandanme #33; 3–4	East Sandanme #51; 6–1
1993	East Sandanme #5; 6–1	West Makushita #34; 4–3	West Makushita #23; 4–3	West Makushita #16; 4–3	East Makushita #12; Sat out due to injury 0–0–7	East Makushita #12; 5–2
1994	West Makushita #7; 2–5	East Makushita #22; 6–1	East Makushita #9; 5–2	West Makushita #4; 5–2	East Makushita #2; 6–1	East Jūryō #12; 9–6
1995	East Jūryō #9; 6–9	East Makushita #1; 3–4	West Makushita #5; 4–3	East Makushita #3; 4–3	West Makushita #2; 0–2–5	East Makushita #37; Sat out due to injury 0–0–7
1996	East Makushita #37; 5–2	East Makushita #21; 2–5	West Makushita #40; 4–3	East Makushita #31; 6–1–P	East Makushita #13; 5–2	East Makushita #5; 3–4
1997	East Makushita #8; 6–1	East Makushita #2; 2–5	East Makushita #14; 2–5	West Makushita #29; 6–1	West Makushita #12; 4–3	East Makushita #10; 6–1
1998	East Makushita #2; 2–5	West Makushita #13; 1–6	West Makushita #36; 6–1	East Makushita #16; 4–3	West Makushita #12; 4–3	East Makushita #8; 3–4
1999	East Makushita #14; 4–3	West Makushita #11; 4–3	East Makushita #9; 7–0; Champion	West Jūryō #11; 8–7	West Jūryō #10; 6–9	West Jūryō #13; 9–6
2000	West Jūryō #9; 7–8	East Jūryō #11; 13–2–P	East Jūryō #2; 8–7	East Maegashira #13; 8–7	West Maegashira #12; 5–10	East Jūryō #1; 3–5–7
2001	West Jūryō #9; Sat out due to injury 0–0–15	West Jūryō #9; 9–6	West Jūryō #4; 7–8	East Jūryō #6; 9–6–PP	West Jūryō #2; 7–8	West Jūryō #3; 8–7
2002	East Maegashira #15; 6–9	East Jūryō #3; Sat out due to injury 0–0–15	East Makushita #1; Sat out due to injury 0–0–7	East Makushita #41; 5–2	East Makushita #26; 2–5	West Makushita #44; 6–1
2003	West Makushita #18; 5–2	East Makushita #9; 4–3	West Makushita #6; 4–3	West Makushita #3; 5–2	West Jūryō #11; 4–11	West Makushita #5; Retired; 2–5
Record given as wins–losses–absences Top division champion Top division runner-up Retired Lower divisions Non-participation Sanshō key: F=Fighting spirit; O=Outstanding performance; T=Technique Also shown: ★=Kinboshi; P=Playoff(s); Divisions: Makuuchi — Jūryō — Makushita — Sandanme — Jonidan — Jonokuchi Makuuchi ranks: Yokozuna — Ōzeki — Sekiwake — Komusubi — Maegashira

== Kickboxing record ==
Kickboxing record
1 win (1 KO), 2 losses
Date	Result	Opponent	Event	Location	Method	Round	Time	Record	Notes
December 25, 2010	Win	(Japan) Wakashoyo	Survivor: Round 6	Tokyo, Japan	TKO (3 knockdowns)	1	1:09	1-2	
July 31, 2010	Loss	(Japan) Tsutomu Takahagi	Big Bang 2: The Way to Unification	Japan	TKO (corner stoppage)	2	1:09	0-2	
August 5, 2007	Loss	(Japan) Taiei Kin	K-1 World Grand Prix 2007 in Hong Kong	Hong Kong	KO (right high kick)	1	1:43	0-1	2007 Hong Kong Grand Prix quarter-final bout.
Legend: Win Loss Draw/No contest

== Mixed martial arts record ==
Professional record breakdown
23 matches	6 wins	16 losses
By knockout	5	13
By submission	1	2
By decision	0	1
No contests	1	

Res.	Record	Opponent	Method	Event	Date	Round	Time	Location	Notes
Loss	6–16 (1)	Kazuhiro Nakamura	KO (punch)	DEEP 63 Impact	August 25, 2013	1	4:42	Tokyo, Japan	Openweight bout.
Loss	6–15 (1)	Soa Palelei	TKO (punches)	K-Oz Entertainment: Bragging Rights	September 3, 2012	1	1:26	Perth, Australia	
Loss	6–14 (1)	Shunsuke Inoue	TKO (punches)	HEAT 20	December 17, 2011	1	1:43	Tokyo, Japan	
Loss	6–13 (1)	Myles Tynanes	TKO (punches)	HEAT 19	September 25, 2011	1	3:29	Nagoya, Japan	
Loss	6–12 (1)	Takaaki Oban	Submission (rear-naked choke)	Gladiator 23	September 3, 2011	1	1:40	Hiroshima, Japan	
Loss	6–11 (1)	Taiei Kin	TKO (corner stoppage)	HEAT 16	November 6, 2010	1	4:01	Osaka, Japan	
Loss	6–10 (1)	Yoshihiro Nakao	TKO (punches)	World Victory Road Presents: Sengoku 12	March 7, 2010	2	3:27	Tokyo, Japan	
Win	6–9 (1)	Kim Min-soo	KO (punches and knees)	The Khan 2	November 27, 2009	1	1:12	Seoul, South Korea	
Loss	5–9 (1)	Lee Chang-seob	TKO (punches)	HEAT 12	November 1, 2009	1	0:53	Nagoya, Japan	
Loss	5–8 (1)	Cristiano Kaminishi	TKO (punches)	HEAT 11	September 26, 2009	3	3:36	Tokyo, Japan	For the inaugural HEAT Heavyweight Championship.
NC	5–7 (1)	Cristiano Kaminishi	NC (accidental knee to groin)	HEAT 10	July 18, 2009	1	0:54	Tokyo, Japan	HEAT Heavyweight Tournament Final.
Win	5–7	Ryuta Noji	KO (punches)	HEAT 9	March 28, 2009	1	1:14	Nagoya, Japan	HEAT Heavyweight Tournament Semifinal.
Win	4–7	Junpei Hamada	KO (punches)	HEAT 8	December 14, 2008	1	0:52	Tokyo, Japan	HEAT Heavyweight Tournament Quarterfinal.
Loss	3–7	Cristiano Kaminishi	KO (head kick)	DEEP 29 Impact	April 13, 2007	1	4:00	Tokyo, Japan	
Win	3–6	Kim Ji-hoon	KO (punch)	HEAT 3	March 23, 2007	1	4:58	Nagoya, Japan	
Loss	2–6	Mostapha al-Turk	TKO (punches)	Cage Rage 18	August 27, 2006	1	0:56	London, England	
Win	2–5	Seiji Ogura	Submission (rear-naked choke)	Pancrase: Blow 6	August 27, 2006	1	1:37	Yokohama, Japan	
Loss	1–5	Robert Berry	TKO (punches)	Cage Rage 17	July 1, 2006	1	1:06	London, England	Return to Heavyweight.
Loss	1–4	Zuluzinho	TKO (knees)	Pride 30	October 23, 2005	1	1:31	Saitama, Japan	Super Heavyweight debut.
Loss	1–3	James Thompson	KO (punches)	Pride Bushido 8	July 17, 2005	1	1:21	Nagoya, Japan	
Loss	1–2	Makoto Takimoto	Decision (unanimous)	Pride Shockwave 2004	December 31, 2004	3	5:00	Saitama, Saitama, Japan	
Win	1–1	Mal Foki	KO (punches)	Pride Bushido 5	October 14, 2004	1	0:21	Osaka, Japan	
Loss	0–1	Paulo César da Silva	Submission (kimura)	Pride Total Elimination 2004	April 25, 2004	1	4:04	Saitama, Japan	Heavyweight debut. 2004 Pride Heavyweight Grand Prix Round of 16.

== See also ==
- List of male mixed martial artists
- Glossary of sumo terms
- List of past sumo wrestlers
- List of non-Japanese sumo wrestlers
