= Ōshima stable (2022) =

Stable of sumo wrestlers

Coordinates: 35.7060°N 139.8131°E

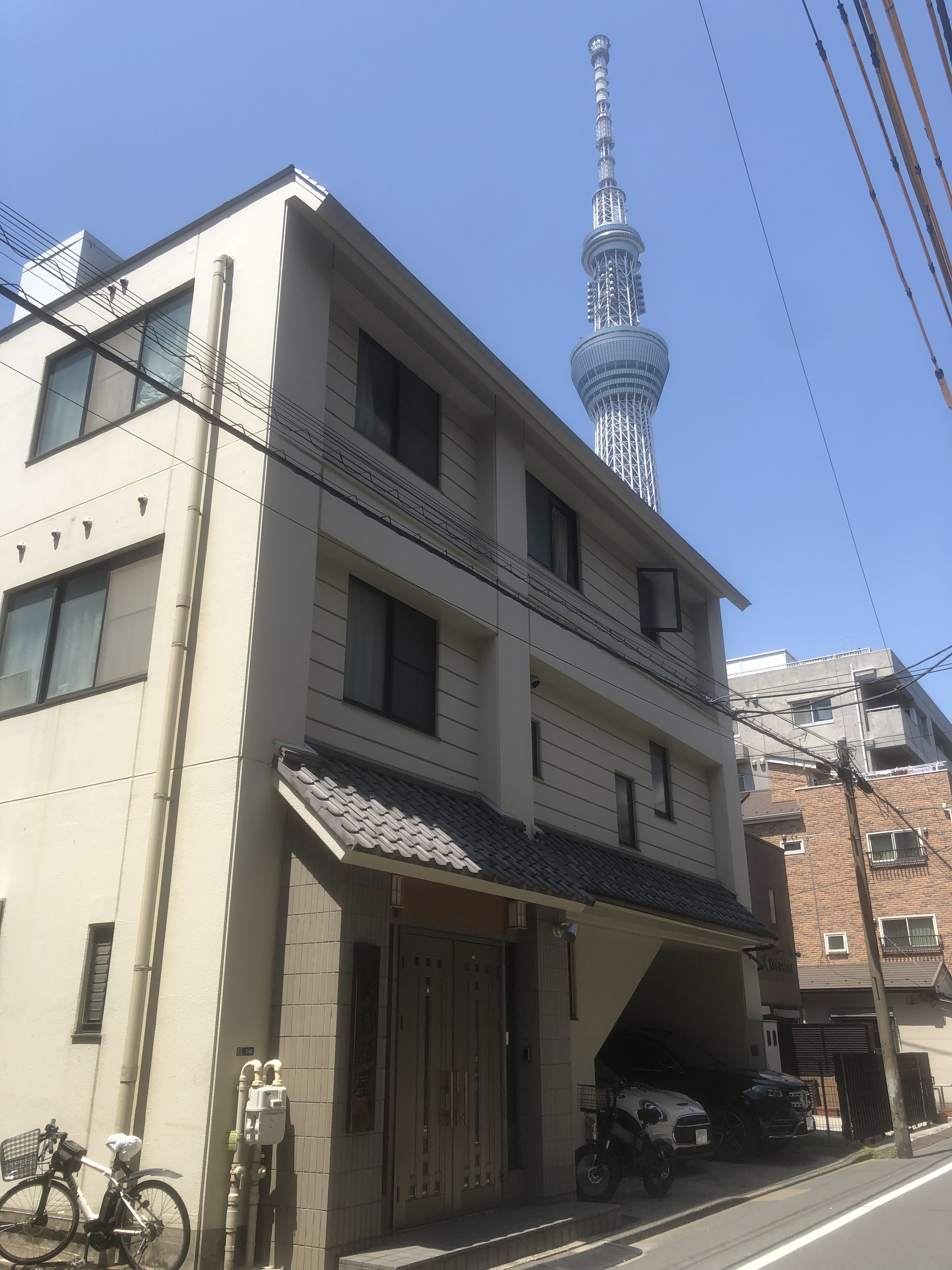
Former stable building in Sumida with Sky Tree in background

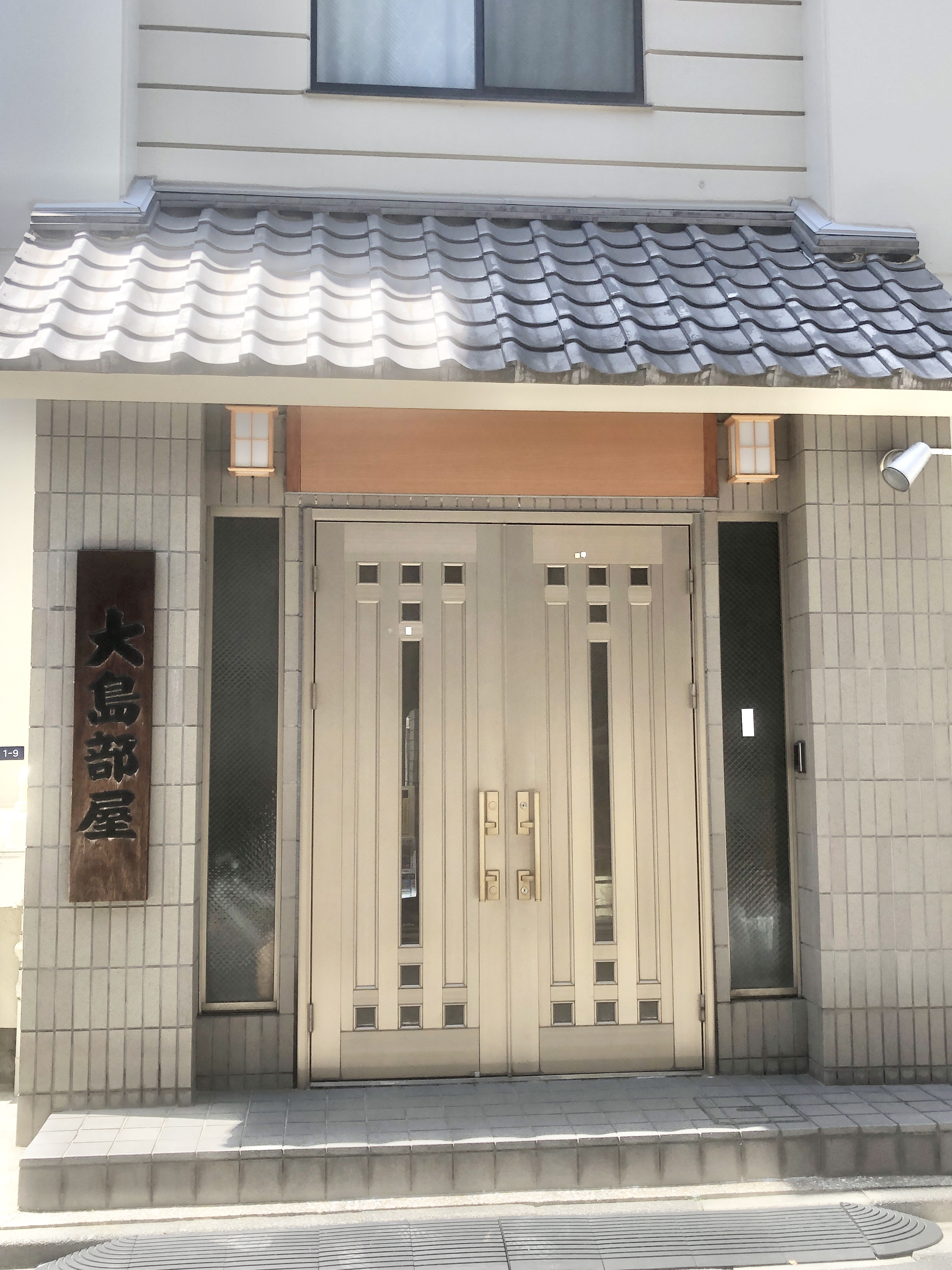
Former stable building entrance

Ōshima stable (大島部屋, Ōshima-beya), formerly known as Tomozuna stable (友綱部屋, Tomozuna-beya), is a stable of sumo wrestlers, part of the Isegahama ichimon or group of stables.

As of May 2026, the stable has 7 active wrestlers.

The current version of the stable was established in January 1961 by former komusubi Tomoegata. who (having previously been associated with an incarnation of Tomozuna stable that closed in 1946) had run a former incarnation of Takashima stable since 1951 and then exchanged elder names. Upon reaching the age of 65 in 1976 he turned the stable over to the former jūryō wrestler Yamatonishiki. In 1989 former sekiwake Kaiki became the stablemaster upon Yamatonishiki's retirement, and eventually produced ōzeki Kaiō.

In April 2012, the stable absorbed seven wrestlers from a previous incarnation of the Ōshima stable, due to Ōshima reaching the mandatory retirement age of 65. Among the wrestlers who transferred was former sekiwake Kyokutenhō, who one month later won his first yūshō (or tournament) for his new stable. In February 2014, ōzeki Kaiō branched off and formed Asakayama stable, taking two wrestlers from Tomozuna with him. In June 2017, Kyokutenhō became the 11th Tomozuna's owner, and the first Mongolian born wrestler to take charge of a stable. He had retired two years earlier and inherited the Ōshima name, but rather than immediately re-establish Ōshima stable, he chose to initially keep the Tomozuna name by swapping elder names with the previous head coach (Kaiki) upon the latter reaching 65 years of age.

On 1 February 2022, Tomozuna stable was renamed Ōshima stable following another swap of elder names between Kyokutenhō and Kaiki. Following the demotion and subsequent retirement of Kaisei the stable had no sekitori between September 2022 and September 2025, when Kyokukaiyū was promoted to the jūryō division.

On 7 February 2023, Ōshima stable, along with Kokonoe stable and Futagoyama stable, signed a partnership and cooperation agreement with the Katsushika Ward of Tokyo. The agreement was presented as having the objective of cooperating further in a wide range of areas, including tourism, culture, sports, and educational promotion, and work closely to revitalize local communities. It was reported during the November 2023 tournament that Ōshima stable was preparing to move from Sumida to a new three-story location in the Aoto section of Katsushika. The land for the new stable was leased by Katsushika ward. The new stable building opened in October 2024.

== Ring name conventions ==
Many wrestlers at this stable have taken ring names or shikona that begin with the character 魁 (read: kai), in deference to their former head coach Kaiki. Examples Kaiō, Kaidō, Kainishiki and Kainowaka. Since absorbing the old Ōshima stable, they have also inherited wrestlers who use the character 旭 (read: asahi or kyoku), taken from Ōshima's former head coach Asahikuni.

== Owners ==
- 2017–present: 11th Tomozuna / 6th Ōshima (iin, sekiwake Kyokutenhō)
- 1989–2017: 10th Tomozuna (sekiwake Kaiki)
- 1976–1989: 9th Tomozuna: (jūryō Ichinishiki)
- 1941–1976: 9th Takashima/8th Tomozuna (komusubi Tomoegata)

== Notable active wrestlers ==
- Kyokukaiyū (best rank maegashira)

== Coaches ==
- Tamagaki Shinya (iin, komusubi Tomonohana)

== Notable other former members ==
- Kaiō (former ōzeki)
- Kaisei (former sekiwake)
- Kyokushūhō (former maegashira)
- Kyokutaisei (former maegashira)
- Asahishō (former maegashira)
- Sentoryū (former maegashira)
- Kaidō (former jūryō)

== Referee ==
- Kimura Hisanosuke (san'yaku gyōji, real name Toshikazu Hata)
- Shikimori Tomokazu (makushita gyōji, real name Hiromasa Shinya)
- Kimura Katsunosuke (sandanme gyōji, real name Kaito Matsumoto)

== Ushers ==
- Kōkichi (makuuchi yobidashi, real name Katsushi Chiba)
- Akira (makuuchi yobidashi, real name Toshiyuki Ichikawa)
- Katsuki (jonokuchi yobidashi, real name Koki Sawada)

== Hairdresser ==
- Tokoyuki (first class tokoyama)

== Location and access ==
7-27-4 Aoto, Katsushika, Tokyo
15 minute walk from Aoto Station (Keisei Main Line and Oshiage Line)

== See also ==
- List of sumo stables
- List of active sumo wrestlers
- List of past sumo wrestlers
- Glossary of sumo terms
