= Kyokutenhō Masaru =

Sumo wrestler

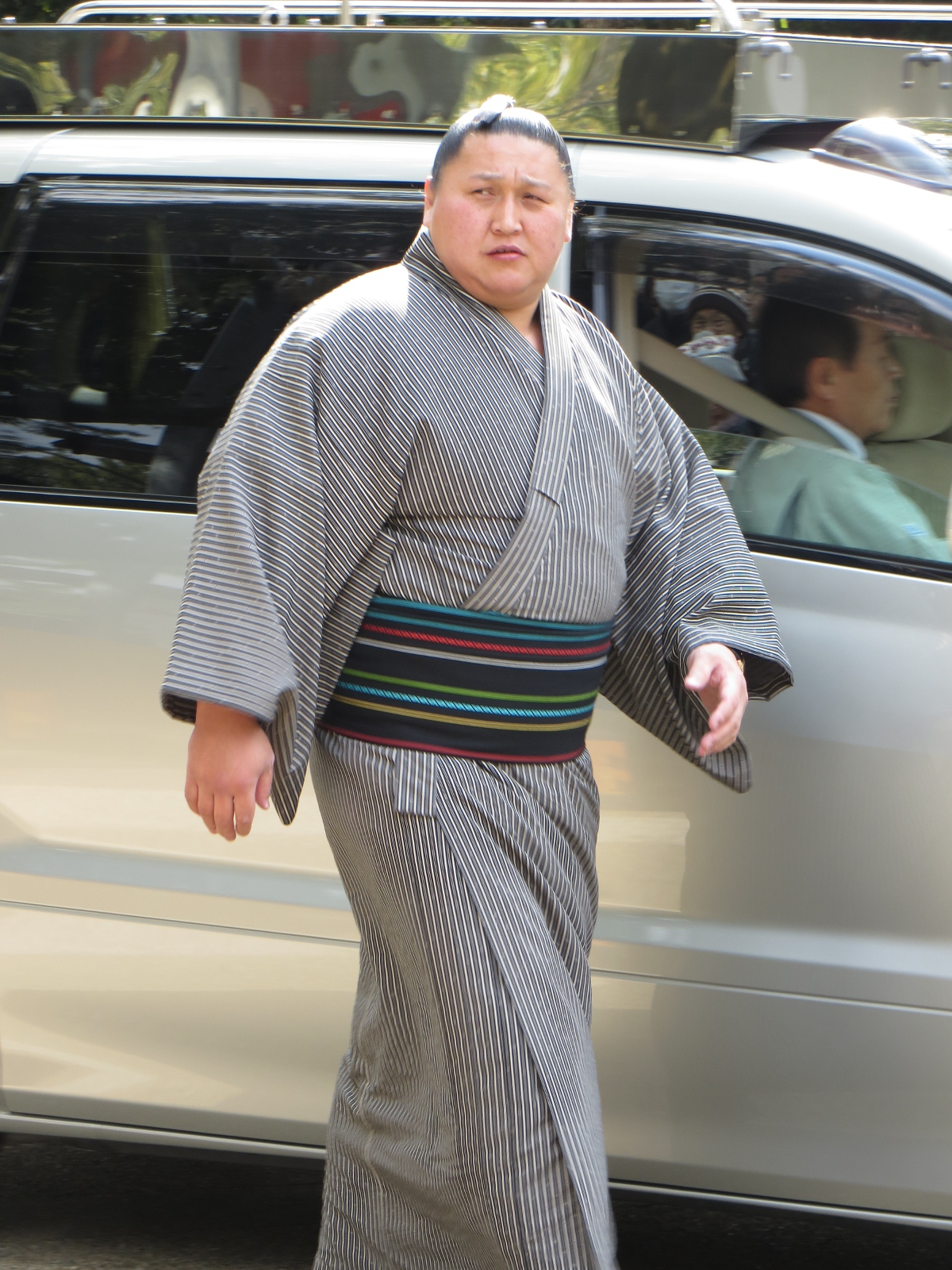
- Masaru in 2013

Personal information
- Native name: 旭天鵬 勝
- Born: Nyamjavyn Tsevegnyam; September 13, 1974 (age 52) Nalaikh, Ulaanbaatar, Mongolian People’s Republic
- Height: 1.91 m (6 ft 3 in)
- Weight: 154 kg (340 lb; 24.3 st)

Sport
- Sport: Sumo
- Retired: July, 2015
- Heya: Ōshima → Tomozuna
- Record: 927-944-22
- Debut: March, 1992
- Highest rank: Sekiwake (July, 2003)
- Elder name: Ōshima
- Championships: Makuuchi (1)
- Special Prizes: Fighting Spirit (7)
- Gold Stars: 2 Asashōryū; Takanohana II
- Updated on September 3, 2016

Kyokutenhō Masaru (旭天鵬 勝; born September 13, 1974 as Nyamjavyn Tsevegnyam, Mongolian: Нямжавын Цэвэгням) in Nalaikh, Ulaanbaatar, Mongolian People’s Republic is a former professional sumo wrestler. He was a member of the Ōshima stable, the first group of Mongolians ever to join the sport in Japan.

He made his debut in March 1992, and reached the top makuuchi division in January 1998. He received seven special prizes for Fighting Spirit, and won one yūshō (or tournament), in May 2012 from the maegashira ranks, which made him at 37 the oldest first–time yūshō winner and the oldest yūshō winner in sumo history overall, until his record was beaten by fellow Mongolian Tamawashi in September 2022. His highest rank was sekiwake, which he held on three occasions.

In his exceptionally long career, he made more appearances in the top division than any other wrestler at 1470, and only Ōshio fought more than his 1870 career bouts. He was the first wrestler since the 1950s to be ranked in the top division after the age of 40.

He announced his retirement in July 2015 and declared his intention to stay in sumo as an elder, having acquired Japanese citizenship in 2005. In 2017 he became the head coach of Tomozuna stable, changing his name and the stable to Ōshima in 2022.

== Career ==
In 1991, Tsevegnyam came to Japan with five other Mongolian wrestlers, including Kyokushūzan, joining Ōshima stable. They were the first Mongolians to join professional sumo. In Mongolia he had had little experience of wrestling or judo, concentrating on basketball in junior high school. Six months after they came to Japan, due to cultural difference, language problems, and the extremely harsh training methods used in sumo, Kyokutenhō, Kyokushūzan and three others ran away and sought refuge in the Mongolian embassy, but he was persuaded by Kyokutenzan to return to his stable.

In March 1996, he was promoted to the second highest jūryō division, achieving sekitori status for the first time. After temporarily dropping down to makushita, he slowly climbed the jūryō division and first won promotion to the top makuuchi division in January 1998. However, he did not establish himself in the division until May 1999. He won his first sanshō or special prize in January 2000. He first achieved a san'yaku rank in January 2002 when he was promoted to komusubi. He has earned two kinboshi or gold stars for yokozuna upsets at maegashira rank, defeating Takanohana in the latter's comeback tournament in September 2002 and fellow Mongolian Asashōryū in his first tournament as a yokozuna in March 2003. He also defeated Asashōryū and Musashimaru whilst ranked in san'yaku. He made his sekiwake debut in July 2003 but did not achieve a kachi-koshi or winning score in his three attempts at the rank.

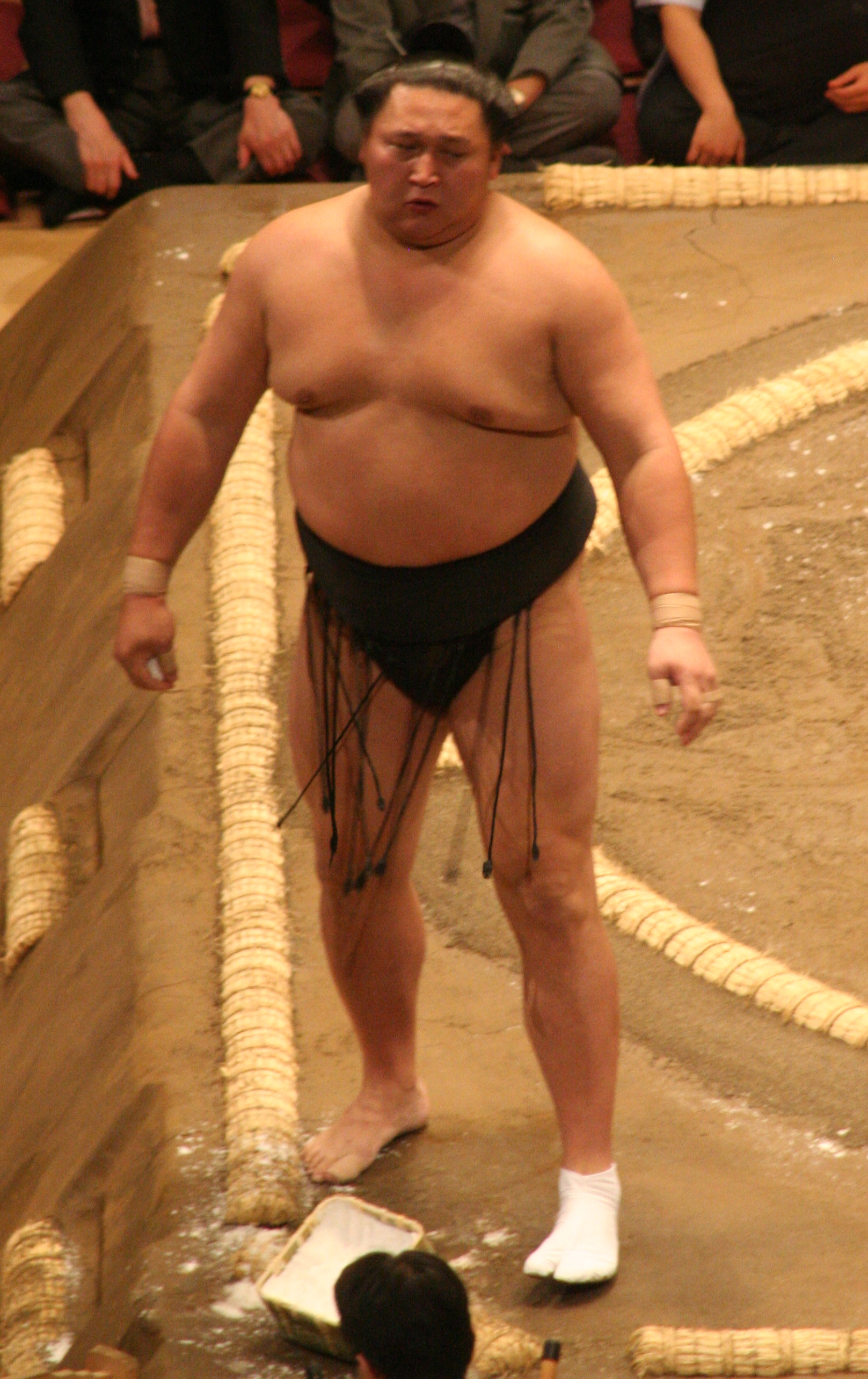
Kyokutenhō in May 2009.

On 28 April 2007 he caused a car accident in Tokyo. He was punished for defying the Japan Sumo Association's ban on wrestlers driving cars by being forced to sit out the May tournament, resulting in demotion to the jūryō division. This broke a string of over 700 consecutive top division bouts dating from his re-entry into makuuchi in May 1999, the longest streak among active wrestlers. However, he won immediate promotion back to the top division with a 12–3 record in July. On his return to the top division in September he was runner-up to yokozuna Hakuhō, his first ever runner-up score in makuuchi. He was awarded his fifth Fighting Spirit prize. In March 2009 he was promoted to komusubi for the first time in 17 tournaments, and became the first former san'yaku wrestler since Mitoizumi in 1988 to drop to the jūryō division and make a return to the san'yaku ranks. He made komusubi once again in July 2009.

Following the retirement of Kaiō in July 2011 Kyokutenhō became the longest serving member of the top division. It had been thought he would become head of Ōshima stable when Asahikuni reached the mandatory retirement age of sixty-five in April 2012, but Kyokutenhō was still comfortably ranked in the top division at the time, and active wrestlers are not permitted to become stablemasters. Instead he continued wrestling and transferred along with his colleagues to Tomozuna stable.

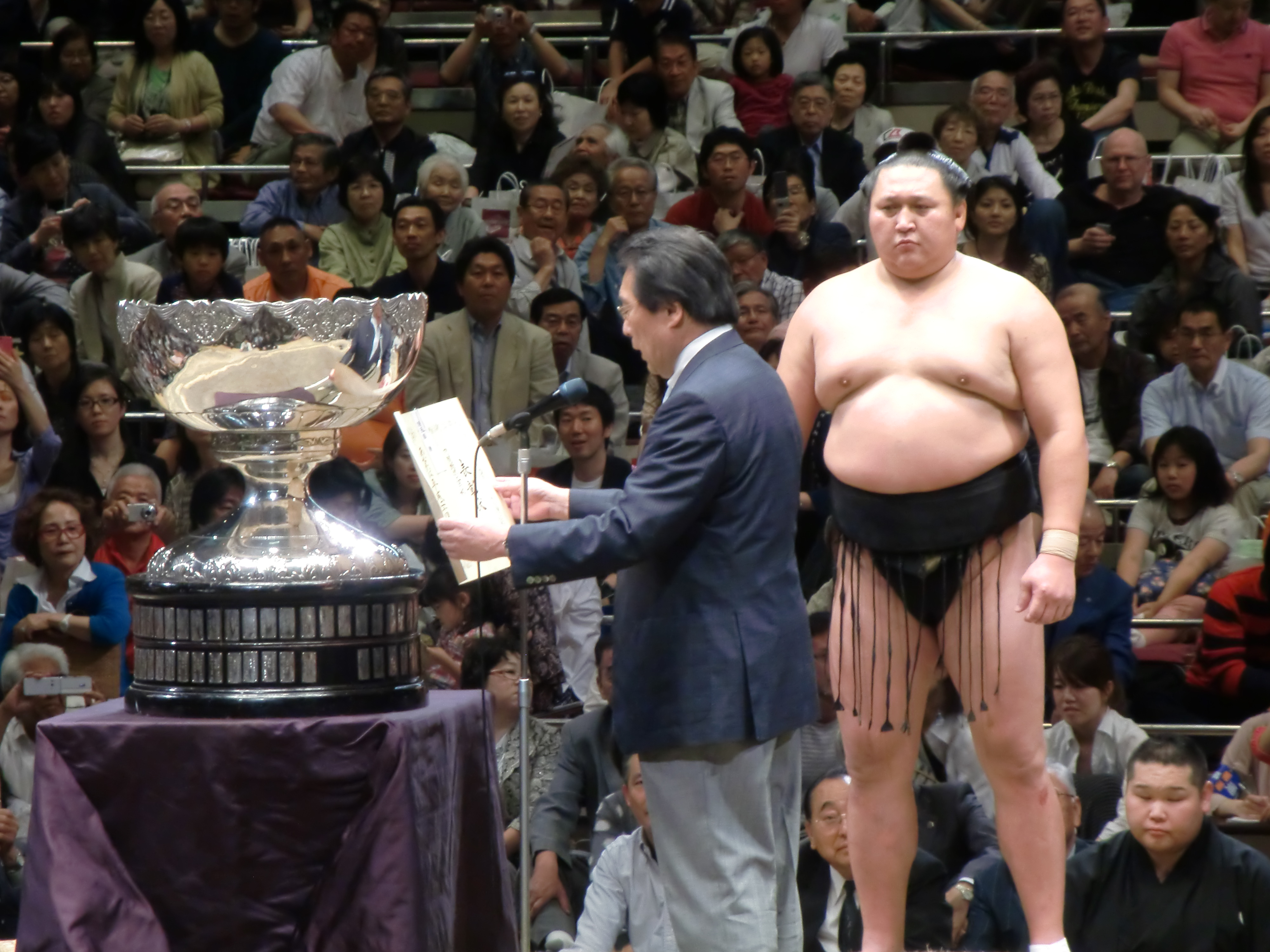
Receiving the Prime Minister's cup in May 2012

In May 2012, in his first tournament for his new stable, he won his first Emperor's Cup by beating Tochiōzan in a playoff after both finished with 12-3 records. In this tournament, Kyokutenhō had been in professional sumo just over twenty years, and at 37 years and 8 months became the oldest wrestler to take his first top division championship in modern sumo history. He was also the first maegashira ranked wrestler to win a tournament since Kotomitsuki in 2001. Also, as Kyokutenhō had acquired Japanese citizenship, he was technically the first Japanese to win the championship since Tochiazuma in January 2006, although he will still be regarded as a 'foreign' champion in the Sumo Association's record book. His yūshō was the 50th won by a Mongolian born wrestler.

Despite his tournament victory Kyokutenhō did not return to the san'yaku ranks for the July tournament, instead being ranked at maegashira 1. He is the first maegashira to win the yūshō and not achieve san'yaku promotion since Sadanoyama in 1961. Kyokutenhō scored only 2–13 in this tournament, losing his first 13 bouts – the worst performance by a defending yūshō champion since Takatōriki also scored 2–13 in May 2000. In September 2014 he became the first 40-year-old to be ranked in makuuchi since the six tournament a year system began in 1958, and he also drew level with Terao on 1795 career appearances, behind only Ōshio's 1891. In November he won ten bouts and was awarded his seventh and final special prize, all for Fighting Spirit. In the May 2015 tournament he surpassed Kaiō's record with his 1445th appearance in the top division.

== Retirement from sumo ==
Kyokutenhō left the ring in tears after losing his twelfth bout of the July 2015 tournament, a result which meant his demotion to the second division was certain. He announced his retirement the following day, stating "I have run out of strength and don’t have the spirit anymore." Hakuhō gave him a ride in the yokozuna's victory parade after winning the tournament. He became Ōshima-oyakata, and began a coaching role at Tomozuna stable. His danpatsu-shiki, or official retirement ceremony, was held in the Ryōgoku Kokugikan on 29 May 2016. It was announced in March 2017 that he would take over the running of Tomozuna stable after the May tournament, as the head coach (ex-sekiwake Kaiki) was about to reach the mandatory retirement age. Kyokutenhō said, "Since I belonged to two different stables, I hope to adopt good practices from both." The two coaches swapped elder names, with the former head of the stable staying as a consultant for a period of five years, under the Ōshima name, and Kyokutenho being known henceforth as Tomozuna Oyakata. The official handover took place on June 11, 2017 at a hotel in Tokyo with around 800 guests. In February 2022 they swapped back, and Tomozuna stable was renamed Ōshima stable.

Due to health problems, Kyokutenhō announced that he would not participate in the May 2024 tournament, where he would have served as a ringside judge.

== Fighting style ==
Kyokutenhō was a solidly yotsu-sumo wrestler, favouring techniques which involve grabbing the opponent's mawashi or belt. He preferred a migi-yotsu (left hand outside, right hand inside) grip. Over half his career wins were by a simple yori-kiri or force out, compared with an average of around 28 percent for all wrestlers.

== Family ==
In 2005, Kyokutenhō obtained Japanese citizenship with the support of his stablemaster, ex ōzeki Asahikuni. His legal name is now Masaru Ōta (太田 勝 Ōta Masaru). He is married to a Japanese woman and his first child, a girl, was born in September 2008.

Kyokutenhō's brother Luvsandorj (Лувсандорж), nine years his junior, also became a sumo wrestler in 2000 under the name Fudoyama. They were the first pair of foreign brothers to join professional sumo. Fudoyama was unable to join Kyokutenhō's stable due to the one foreigner per heya limit, so he joined Takashima stable instead. However, he never climbed higher than the third makushita division and retired in January 2008.

Kyokutenhō is the brother-in-law of the former maegashira Shōtenrō.

== Career record ==
Kyokutenhō Masaru
Year	January Hatsu basho, Tokyo	March Haru basho, Osaka	May Natsu basho, Tokyo	July Nagoya basho, Nagoya	September Aki basho, Tokyo	November Kyūshū basho, Fukuoka
1992	x	(Maezumō)	East Jonokuchi #47; 6–1	West Jonidan #98; 4–3	East Jonidan #72; Sat out due to injury 0–0–7	West Jonidan #142; 5–2
1993	West Jonidan #86; 5–2	West Jonidan #44; 5–2	West Jonidan #8; 5–2	East Sandanme #71; 4–3	East Sandanme #51; 6–1	East Sandanme #5; 3–4
1994	West Sandanme #19; 5–2	West Makushita #53; 4–3	East Makushita #44; 2–5	East Sandanme #9; 5–2	East Makushita #45; 6–1	East Makushita #21; 4–3
1995	West Makushita #16; 3–4	East Makushita #24; 3–4	East Makushita #33; 4–3	East Makushita #27; 4–3	East Makushita #19; 4–3	East Makushita #13; 4–3
1996	West Makushita #9; 7–0–P	East Jūryō #13; 9–6	West Jūryō #7; 6–9	East Jūryō #12; 8–7	West Jūryō #8; 5–10	East Makushita #1; 4–3
1997	West Jūryō #11; 7–8	West Jūryō #12; 8–7	East Jūryō #9; 9–6	East Jūryō #4; 8–7	East Jūryō #2; 8–7	West Jūryō #1; 9–6
1998	West Maegashira #15; 9–6	East Maegashira #12; 6–9	East Jūryō #1; 8–7	West Maegashira #15; 4–11	East Jūryō #5; 8–7	West Jūryō #2; 6–9
1999	East Jūryō #6; 9–6	East Jūryō #1; 8–7	East Maegashira #14; 9–6	West Maegashira #10; 7–8	East Maegashira #12; 8–7	East Maegashira #8; 6–9
2000	East Maegashira #13; 11–4; F	West Maegashira #2; 4–11	East Maegashira #6; 7–8	West Maegashira #7; 9–6	East Maegashira #3; 4–11	West Maegashira #6; 7–8
2001	East Maegashira #8; 10–5	East Maegashira #1; 3–12	West Maegashira #7; 6–9	East Maegashira #11; 8–7	East Maegashira #8; 9–6	West Maegashira #5; 8–7
2002	East Komusubi #1; 6–9	East Maegashira #2; 6–9	West Maegashira #4; 6–9	East Maegashira #8; 8–7	East Maegashira #3; 8–7 ★	East Komusubi #1; 7–8
2003	East Maegashira #2; 8–7	East Maegashira #1; 9–6; F★	West Komusubi #1; 10–5; F	West Sekiwake #1; 6–9	East Maegashira #2; 10–5; F	West Sekiwake #1; 4–11
2004	West Maegashira #3; 8–7	West Maegashira #2; 10–5	East Sekiwake #1; 6–9	East Maegashira #1; 8–7	East Komusubi #1; 5–10	West Maegashira #3; 5–10
2005	East Maegashira #6; 10–5	East Maegashira #1; 6–9	West Maegashira #3; 6–9	West Maegashira #5; 8–7	West Maegashira #3; 10–5	East Komusubi #1; 8–7
2006	East Komusubi #1; 4–11	East Maegashira #5; 11–4	East Komusubi #1; 5–10	West Maegashira #2; 6–9	West Maegashira #4; 6–9	East Maegashira #6; 8–7
2007	East Maegashira #3; 8–7	East Maegashira #2; 4–11	East Maegashira #8; Suspended; 0–0–15	West Jūryō #3; 12–3–P	West Maegashira #12; 12–3; F	West Maegashira #4; 4–11
2008	West Maegashira #10; 10–5	West Maegashira #4; 8–7	East Maegashira #2; 4–11	East Maegashira #9; 10–5	East Maegashira #3; 6–9	West Maegashira #6; 10–5
2009	West Maegashira #1; 9–6	West Komusubi #1; 6–9	West Maegashira #2; 8–7	East Komusubi #1; 6–9	West Maegashira #2; 5–10	West Maegashira #6; 8–7
2010	West Maegashira #5; 8–7	East Maegashira #2; 3–12	West Maegashira #7; 9–6	East Maegashira #3; 7–8	West Maegashira #3; 4–11	East Maegashira #9; 9–6
2011	East Maegashira #6; 7–8	East Maegashira #8; Tournament Cancelled; Match fixing investigation 0–0–0	East Maegashira #8; 8–7	East Maegashira #2; 2–13	West Maegashira #10; 11–4	West Maegashira #2; 4–11
2012	West Maegashira #6; 9–6	East Maegashira #3; 5–10	West Maegashira #7; 12–3–P; F	East Maegashira #1; 2–13	East Maegashira #11; 10–5	East Maegashira #6; 10–5
2013	West Maegashira #2; 4–11	West Maegashira #8; 7–8	East Maegashira #9; 9–6	East Maegashira #4; 6–9	West Maegashira #6; 8–7	East Maegashira #2; 5–10
2014	West Maegashira #5; 6–9	West Maegashira #8; 9–6	West Maegashira #3; 3–12	East Maegashira #12; 6–9	East Maegashira #14; 8–7	West Maegashira #11; 10–5; F
2015	East Maegashira #7; 5–10	West Maegashira #11; 6–9	West Maegashira #14; 8–7	West Maegashira #11; Retired; 3–12	x	x
Record given as wins–losses–absences Top division champion Top division runner-up Retired Non-participation Jūryō Lower divisions Sanshō key: F=Fighting spirit; O=Outstanding performance; T=Technique Also shown: ★=Kinboshi; P=Playoff(s); Divisions: Makuuchi — Jūryō — Makushita — Sandanme — Jonidan — Jonokuchi Makuuchi ranks: Yokozuna — Ōzeki — Sekiwake — Komusubi — Maegashira

== See also ==
- Glossary of sumo terms
- List of sumo elders
- List of past sumo wrestlers
- List of Mongolian sumo wrestlers
- List of non-Japanese sumo wrestlers
- List of sumo record holders
- List of sumo top division champions
- List of sekiwake
- List of sumo top division runners-up
