= Kaiō Hiroyuki =

Sumo wrestler

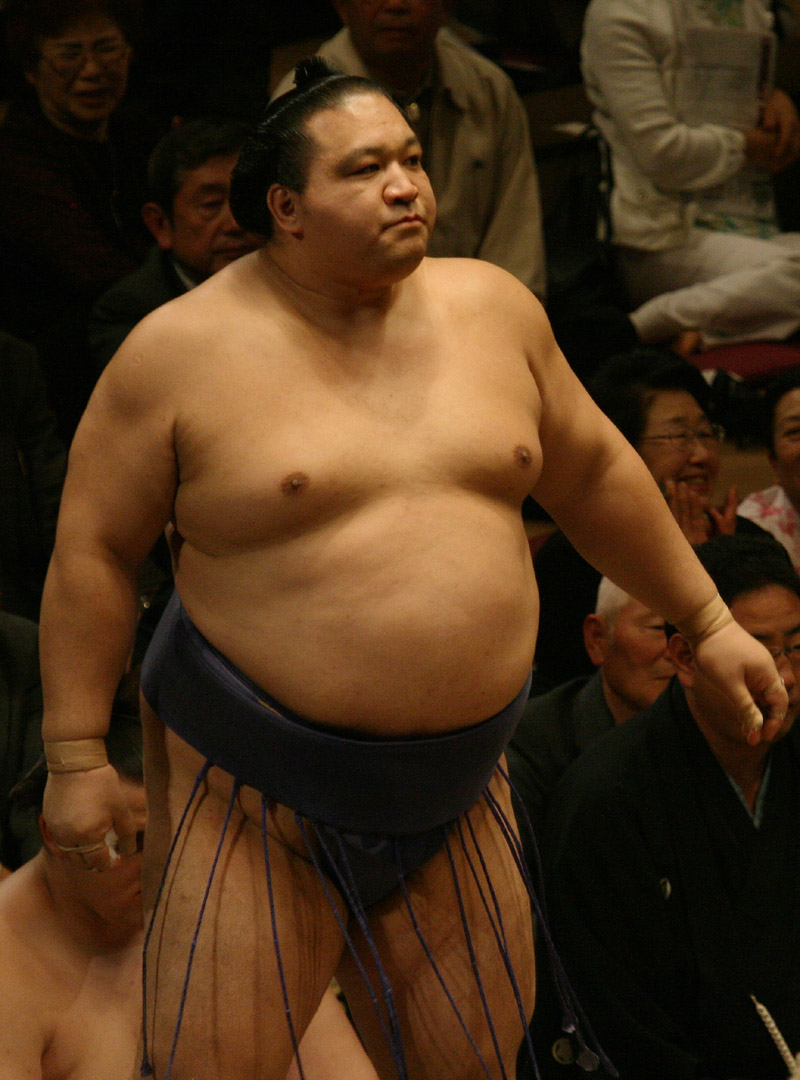
- Kaiō in May 2008

Personal information
- Native name: 魁皇 博之
- Born: Hiroyuki Koga; 24 July 1972 (age 54) Nōgata, Fukuoka, Japan
- Height: 1.85 m (6 ft 1 in)
- Weight: 170 kg (375 lb; 26 st 11 lb)
- Website: http://www.kaiou-asakayama.com

Sport
- Sport: Sumo
- Retired: July 2011
- Heya: Tomozuna
- Record: 1047–700–158
- Debut: March 1988
- Highest rank: Ōzeki (September 2000)
- Elder name: Asakayama
- Championships: 5 (Makuuchi); 1 (Makushita); 1 (Sandanme)
- Special Prizes: Outstanding Performance (10); Fighting Spirit (5)
- Gold Stars: 6 Takanohana (3); Akebono (2); Wakanohana III
- Updated on July 2011

Kaiō Hiroyuki (born 24 July 1972 as Hiroyuki Koga) is a former professional sumo wrestler from Nōgata, Fukuoka, Japan.

He made his debut in 1988, reaching the top makuuchi division in 1993. He held the second highest rank of ōzeki or champion for eleven years from 2000 to 2011, and is the longest-serving ōzeki of all time in terms of number of tournaments fought.

In his career, Kaiō won five top division yūshō or tournament championships, the last coming in 2004. This is the modern record for someone who has not ultimately made the top rank of yokozuna. He was a runner-up in eleven other tournaments, and also won 15 sanshō or special prizes, the third highest ever.

In November 2009 he broke the record previously held by Takamiyama for the most tournaments ranked in the top division, and in January 2010 he surpassed Chiyonofuji's record of most top division bouts won. In the May 2010 tournament he became the only wrestler besides Chiyonofuji to reach one thousand career wins, and he surpassed Chiyonofuji's career wins record of 1045 in July 2011. He retired in the same tournament to become a coach at Tomozuna stable under the elder name Asakayama. In 2014, he established the latest incarnation of the Asakayama stable.

== Early career ==
Koga did karate for two years in elementary school, and judo in his second year of junior high school. He had not shown much interest in sumo but was asked by his parents to take part in sumo competitions. It was at one such competition in Fukuoka that he was spotted by the wrestler Kaiki, later Tomozuna Oyakata. After being introduced to Kaiki by a common acquaintance in Nōgata, the young Koga was recruited to Tomozuna stable upon graduation from junior high. Kaiki thought so highly of the apprentice that he promised Koga's parents that he would become a sekitori by the age of 20. However, because the move had been set up by others around him, and he had not ever had the ambition to be a rikishi himself, Koga initially had doubts that he would be able to succeed in sumo.

He made his professional debut in March 1988, at the same time as former yokozuna Akebono, Takanohana and Wakanohana, who all made the top division faster than him but who had all retired by 2003. Initially fighting under his own surname, he reached the makushita division in September 1990 after winning the sandanme championship with a perfect 7–0 record. He won the makushita tournament in July 1991 and in November 1991, in his hometown tournament in Kyushu, he earned promotion to the sekitori ranks—a performance he later recalled as one of his most memorable ever. Upon making his debut in second highest jūryō division in January 1992 he adopted the shikona of Kaiō. After a few injury problems he worked his way up the jūryō division and reached the top makuuchi division for the first time in May 1993. He fell back to jūryō after a 4–11 score in his makuuchi debut. This meant that, oddly, he had recorded a make-koshi or losing score in every tournament in which he was debuting in a new division. However, he returned to the top division in November 1993, where he was to remain for the rest of his career. After defeating his first yokozuna and winning his first special prize in March 1994, he was promoted to a san'yaku rank for the first time for the following tournament in May 1994, at komusubi. He made sekiwake rank in January 1995, and came through with a winning record and another prize in his sekiwake debut.

In the earlier part of his top division career Kaiō's lack of consistency, and injury problems, denied him the major promotion to ōzeki that his ability merited. He set records for both the number of tournaments spent at sekiwake (21) and for the longest run being consecutively ranked in the junior san'yaku ranks without making ōzeki (14). He also accumulated a record equalling ten Shukun-shō, or Outstanding Performance Prizes. Together with his five Kantō-shō, or Fighting Spirit awards, he has 15 special prizes in total, placing him third behind Akinoshima and Kotonishiki. He also earned six kinboshi or gold stars for defeating yokozuna when ranked as a maegashira. He twice took part in playoffs for the championship, in November 1996 (with four other wrestlers, won by Musashimaru) and in March 1997 (with three others, won by Takanohana). In May 1997 injuries to his left leg sustained in a match with Takanonami caused him to miss tournaments and took over a year to fully heal. He could not win more than eight bouts in a tourney during 1998, but he was runner-up in two more tournaments in 1999, in May and November.

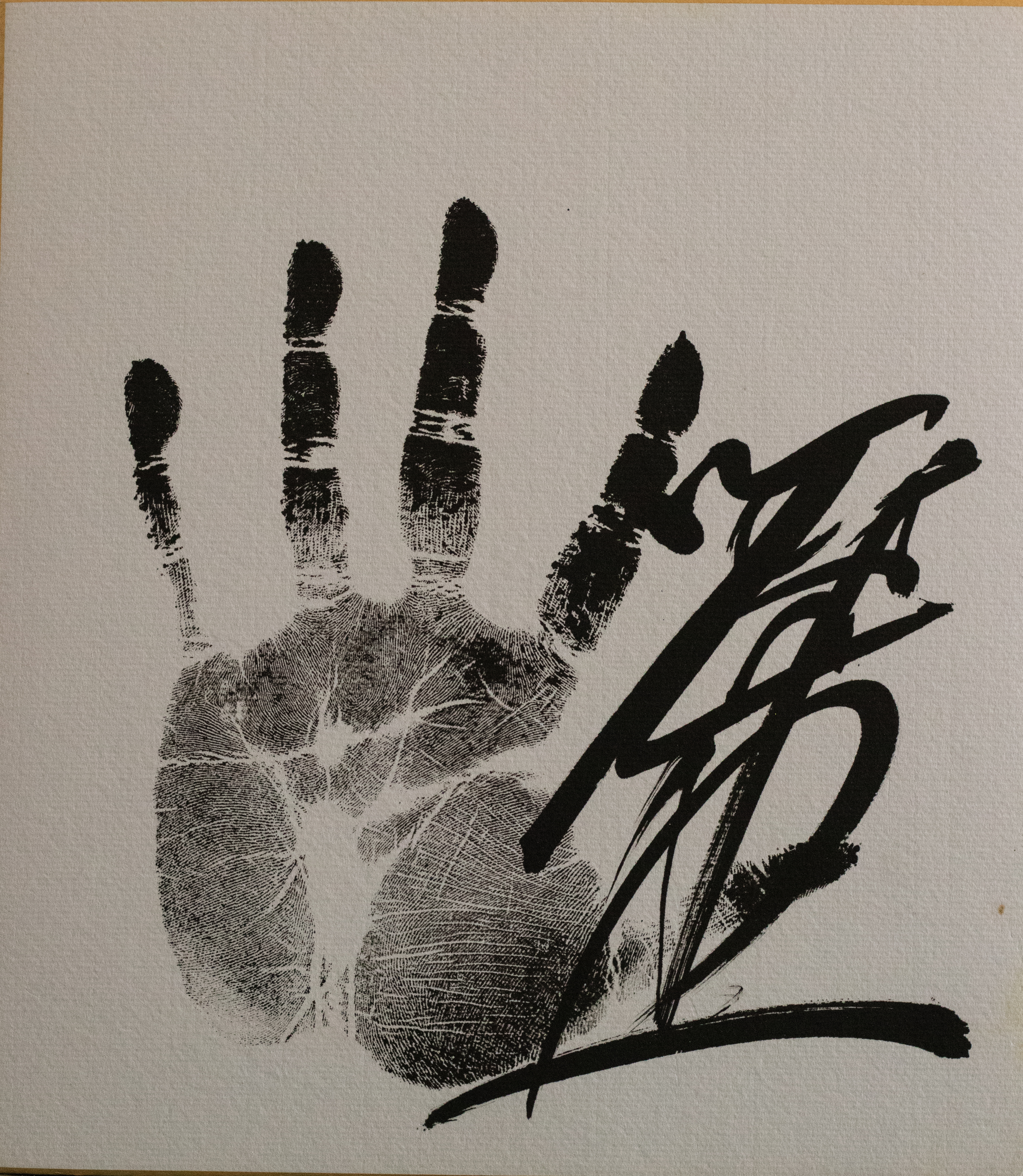
Kaiō original tegata (handprint and signature)

== Ōzeki career ==
Kaiō won his first top division tournament championship in May 2000 from the komusubi rank, defeating yokozuna Takanohana and three ōzeki and losing just one bout to Akebono. It was the first top division yūshō by a wrestler from Tomozuna stable since Tachiyama in 1916. He attributed his victory partly to cutting down on his beer consumption. Set a target of eleven wins by the Japan Sumo Association for promotion to ōzeki in the following tournament in July 2000, he achieved the necessary total on the final day and his promotion was confirmed a few days later. He was 28 years of age, and the 44 tournaments it took him to reach ōzeki from his top division debut was the second slowest ever. Nevertheless, he went on to maintain the rank for eleven years, eventually becoming the oldest ōzeki since the start of the Shōwa era in 1926, and also the longest serving, in terms of number of tournaments, a record he holds jointly with Chiyotaikai.

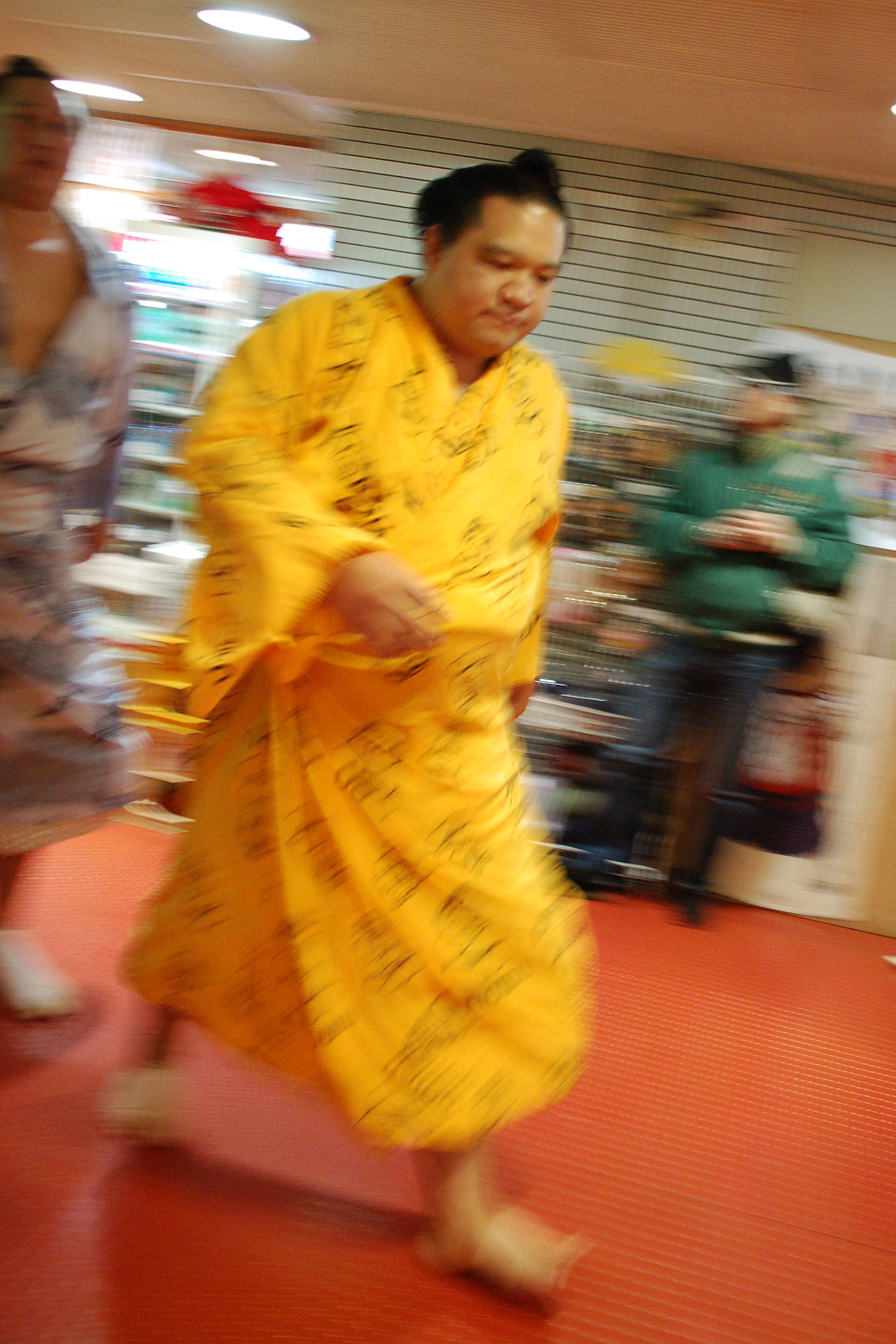
Kaiō in 2006, in yukata

=== Challenge for yokozuna ===
After becoming an ōzeki Kaiō won four more championships and came close to yokozuna promotion on a number of occasions. In March 2001 he won his second championship, losing only to the two yokozuna Takanohana and Musashimaru, and finishing on 13–2, one win ahead of them and Musōyama. His third yūshō came in July 2001, when in the absence of Takanohana he clinched the title on the fourteenth day by defeating Musashimaru. However he was denied the chance of going for consecutive yūshō because after each of these triumphs he had to withdraw from the following tournament with sciatica in his lower back, a chronic problem which continued to restrict his mobility for the rest of his career. He was three times a runner-up in 2002, and then after finishing runner up in consecutive tournaments in March and May 2003 he took the July championship, defeating his only rival Chiyotaikai on the final day to win the yūshō with a 12–3 record. However, after injuring himself in training he could win only seven bouts in the following tournament.

On 6 October 2001, JR Kyushu started a new train service named after him from Hakata to his home town Nōgata, making it one of the few JR trains named after a living person. Kaiō was also invited to the launching ceremony, but eventually did not attend because of his health issues.

In 2004, a year in which Kaiō was injury-free, he was runner-up in March, and then won the September tournament virtually unchallenged after two of his three ōzeki rivals dropped out injured and yokozuna Asashōryū could score only 9–6. He finished on 13–2, two wins ahead of rank-and-filers Tochinonada and Kyokushūzan. In the crucial following tournament in November, he dropped his opening bout to Kotomitsuki and then was surprisingly defeated by newcomer Hakuhō on Day 10 and sekiwake Miyabiyama on Day 12. Although he defeated Asashōryū on the final day to finish runner-up to the yokozuna with twelve wins, it was one win short of the thirteen deemed necessary by the Sumo Association for promotion. Kaiō was set another target of thirteen wins in the following January 2005 tournament, but pulled out with a shoulder injury on the 9th day. This proved to be his final attempt at yokozuna promotion. Due to his injuries he was kadoban (in danger of demotion from ōzeki) a total of thirteen times, a record second only to Chiyotaikai.

=== Later ōzeki career ===
After his eleventh runner-up performance in November 2004 Kaiō seldom contended for the championship or even produced a score in double figures, leading some commentators to suggest his retirement was overdue. However, he continued to set records. His 8–7 mark in January 2008 was his 64th kachi-koshi (majority of wins against losses) in the top division, breaking the record previously held by Kitanoumi. In May 2008 he became only the fourth man, after Kitanoumi, Ōshio and Chiyonofuji, to reach 900 career wins, and in July 2008, on his 36th birthday, he moved ahead of Taihō into third place on the all-time list of top division wins, behind only Chiyonofuji and Kitanoumi. In September 2009 he won his 965th career match, moving past Ōshio into second place on career wins. The November 2009 tournament was Kaiō's 98th ranked in the top division, breaking the 25-year-old record held by Takamiyama. During this tournament he overtook Kitanoumi to move into second place on top division wins, just one behind Chiyonofuji on 806. He also became the first wrestler to post six successive 8–7 scores in a calendar year.

On the third day of the January 2010 tournament, he set a new record for makuuchi wins, breaking former yokozuna Chiyonofuji's record of 807. Ironically, his 808th win was a defeat of fellow veteran ōzeki and Chiyonofuji disciple, Chiyotaikai. Chiyotaikai would announce his retirement the next day. Kaiō was congratulated by Chiyonofuji, who said it was "a splendid achievement...records are there to be broken." In the same tournament, Kaiō also ended a string of 17 consecutive losses against yokozuna Hakuhō by defeating him on the 13th day and paving the way for Asashōryū to take the tournament. The May 2010 tournament was Kaiō's 111th ranked in jūryō or above, breaking the record previously held by Terao. Shortly before the tournament began he was given the prime minister's award for his contribution to promoting sport in Japan. On the final day of the basho he won his 1000th career match with a victory over Kotoōshū, becoming only the second wrestler after Chiyonofuji to reach this landmark.

The dismissal of Kotomitsuki in July 2010 for involvement in illegal gambling on baseball left Kaiō as the only Japanese wrestler in the top two ranks. He expressed sympathy for his fellow ōzeki, telling reporters that dismissal was harsh and that he wished Kotomitsuki could have been given the chance to reform. On Day 10 of the Nagoya Sumo Tournament, Kaiō lost to fellow ōzeki Kotoōshū, and the next morning announced he was pulling out of the tournament with a 6–4 record, citing an injured left shoulder. However, he returned to hold his rank yet again in the September tournament.

The November 2010 tournament in Kaiō's hometown of Fukuoka saw him rebound from an opening day loss to win eleven straight matches, challenging for the yūshō alongside Hakuhō, Baruto and Toyonoshima. This was the first time he had achieved double-digit wins since May 2007, and his run did much to restore interest in a tournament that had seen Hakuhō's postwar record winning streak of 63 matches come to an end on just the second day. He finished on 12–3, his best performance in six years. As a result, on the January 2011 banzuke he returned to the top ōzeki position of #1 East for the first time in 21 tournaments. Following the retirement of Tosanoumi he was the oldest active sekitori in this tournament.

In February 2011 he apologised to sumo fans on behalf of the Sumo Association for the cancellation of the March tournament in Osaka due to an ongoing investigation into match-fixing by 14 wrestlers and stablemasters. In that tournament Kaiō would have been hoping to break Chiyonofuji's record of 1045 career wins, of which he was at that time just ten shy. He told reporters, "I can no longer think of my personal career. I must focus on what I should do for the sumo world."

On the fifth day of the "technical examination tournament" held in May 2011 Kaiō achieved his 516th win as an ōzeki, breaking the record previously held by Chiyotaikai. On Day 12 he fought his 1431st top division match, surpassing Takamiyama's total. His final day victory over Hakuhō was his 1044th in sumo, just one behind Chiyonofuji, but he commented afterwards, "Under these [test meet] circumstances, I'm not thinking of that." At 38 years and 9 months he was the oldest rikishi in over 70 years to beat a yokozuna.

== Retirement from sumo ==
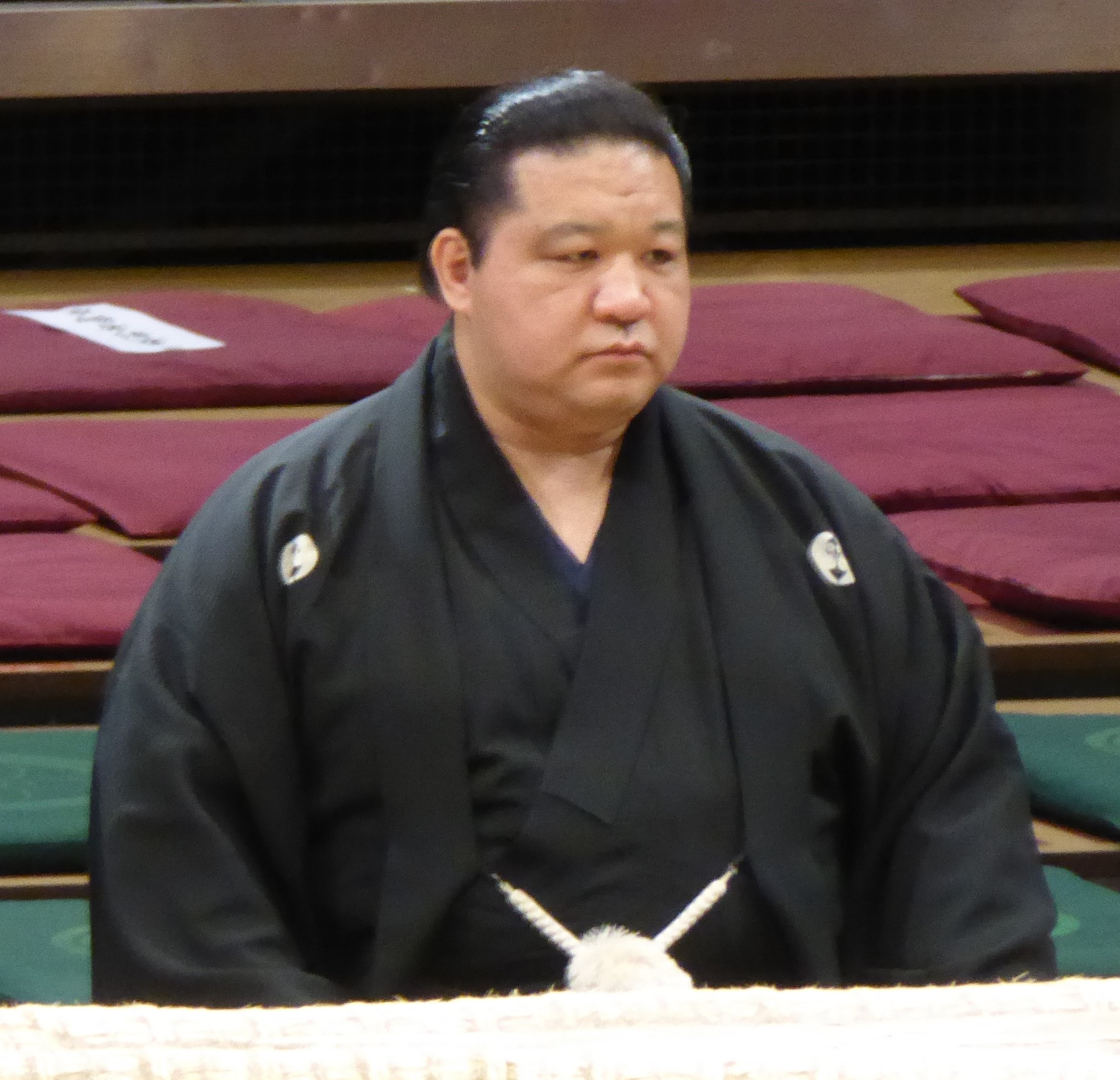
Working as a ringside judge, May 2016

The July 2011 tournament was Kaiō's 65th as an ōzeki, tying Chiyotaikai's record. On the fourth day he slapped down Toyonoshima to earn his first victory of the basho and his 1045th in his career. Congratulated by Chiyonofuji backstage after the bout, Kaiō replied, "I feel sorry to be compared to someone as great as you." The following day he forced out Kyokutenhō to surpass Chiyonofuji and in first place. On Day 10, having lost to Kotoōshū to fall to 3–7, Kaiō announced his retirement from sumo, just a few days short of his 39th birthday, after a discussion with his stablemaster. He remained in sumo as a coach at Tomozuna stable, using the toshiyori or elder name of Asakayama. His retirement left no Japanese at ōzeki or yokozuna for the first time since January 1993. Speaking at a press conference after his announcement, Kaiō said, "I might not have reached yokozuna or won the championship in front of my home fans in Kyushu but I've had a fulfilling career and have no regrets." His danpatsu-shiki, or official retirement ceremony, took place at the Ryōgoku Kokugikan on 27 May 2012, with around 10000 spectators and hundreds of dignitaries, including his fellow March 1988 entrant Takanohana, taking turns to snip his topknot before it was finally removed by his stablemaster Tomozuna.

In February 2014 he established his own stable, Asakayama-beya, in Sumida, Tokyo. In May 2014, the stable had four active wrestlers, and as of January 2018, the roster had increased to 11. In September 2019 the stable produced its first sekitori in Kaishō. After the January 2023 tournament it was announced that Asakayama would become the deputy director of the judging department.

During the January 2024 tournament, he withdrew from his judging duties on the twelfth day and announced his intention to undergo surgery for sinusitis. During the same year, in March, he was elected director of the Japan Sumo Association for the first time, his term of office to run until 2026.

== Fighting style ==
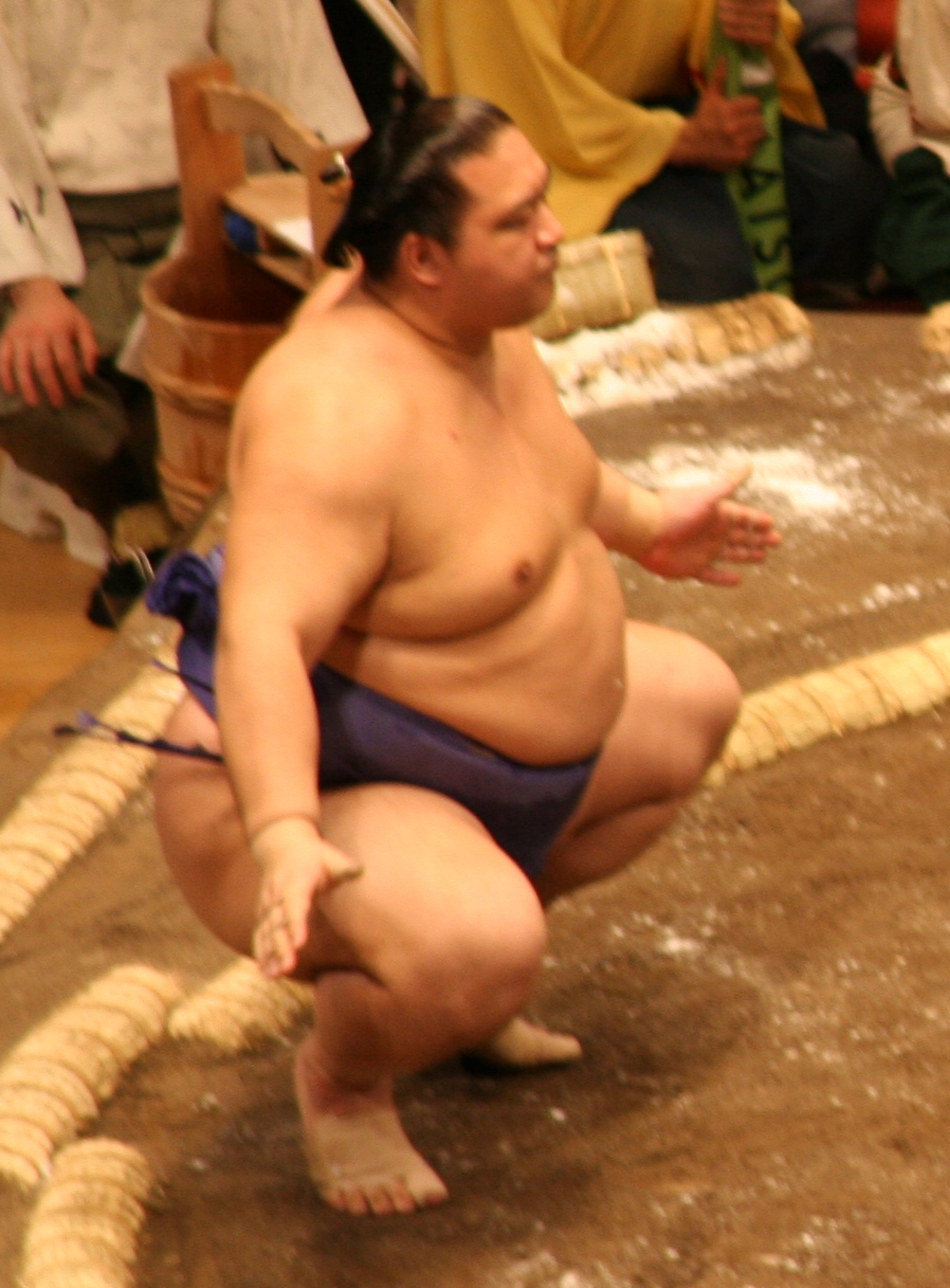
Kaiō in May 2007

Kaiō was solidly a yotsu-sumo wrestler, favouring a right hand outside, left hand inside grip (hidari-yotsu) on his opponent's mawashi or belt. He was well known for his power in the hidari-yotsu position, which even yokozuna Takanohana at his peak had trouble countering. His most common winning technique was a straightforward yori-kiri or force out, which accounted for a third of his career victories, followed by oshi-dashi or push out. He often used his right hand outer grip to win by uwatenage (the overarm throw), which was his most common throwing move. Two of his yūshō-winning bouts were decided by uwatenage, and he was noted for his exceptional power and technique when using this throw. More controversially, he was also known for employing kotenage, (the armlock throw), a technique that can injure the opponent. Kaiō unintentionally caused a number of injuries with this technique over the years, including Tochinonada in 1999, who sustained long-term damage to his elbow, and Kotoryū in March 2001, who suffered a broken arm.

== Personal life ==
Kaiō's wife, Mitsuko Nishiwaki, is a former All Japan Women's Pro-Wrestling professional wrestler. Nishiwaki's apprentices in the promotion include Takako Inoue, Mima Shimoda or Aja Kong. The couple met through a journalist who wrote about both sumo and women's pro wrestling while she was undergoing treatment for ovarian cancer.

The couple married in June 1999. The wedding reception in a hotel in Tokyo was attended by some 570 guests, including Takanohana.

Kaiō published an autobiography, Kairiki (meaning "Herculean Strength").

== Career record ==
Kaiō Hiroyuki
Year	January Hatsu basho, Tokyo	March Haru basho, Osaka	May Natsu basho, Tokyo	July Nagoya basho, Nagoya	September Aki basho, Tokyo	November Kyūshū basho, Fukuoka
1988	x	(Maezumo)	West Jonokuchi #15; 3–4	West Jonokuchi #12; 5–2	East Jonidan #118; 3–4	West Jonidan #113; 6–1
1989	West Jonidan #60; 2–5	East Jonidan #91; 7–0–P	East Sandanme #82; 2–5	East Jonidan #11; 2–5	West Jonidan #35; 5–2	East Sandanme #92; 6–1
1990	East Sandanme #38; 4–3	East Sandanme #23; 3–4	East Sandanme #41; 4–3	West Sandanme #23; 7–0–P; Champion	East Makushita #17; 2–5	East Makushita #32; 3–4
1991	West Makushita #42; 3–4	West Makushita #53; 6–1	East Makushita #26; 3–4	West Makushita #36; 7–0; Champion	East Makushita #5; 4–3	East Makushita #2; 5–2
1992	West Jūryō #10; 7–8	West Jūryō #11; 8–5–2	West Jūryō #8; Sat out due to injury 0–0–15	West Jūryō #8; 9–6	East Jūryō #3; 7–8	East Jūryō #5; 8–7
1993	East Jūryō #3; 8–7	West Jūryō #1; 9–6	West Maegashira #15; 4–11	West Jūryō #6; 10–5	West Jūryō #1; 10–5	West Maegashira #15; 10–5
1994	West Maegashira #6; 8–7	West Maegashira #1; 9–6; O★	East Komusubi #1; 8–7	East Komusubi #1; 5–10	East Maegashira #2; 9–6	East Komusubi #1; 8–7
1995	East Sekiwake #1; 8–7; O	East Sekiwake #1; 8–7	West Sekiwake #1; 9–6	East Sekiwake #1; 9–6	West Sekiwake #1; 11–4; O	East Sekiwake #1; 9–6; F
1996	East Sekiwake #1; 10–5; O	East Sekiwake #1; 9–6	West Sekiwake #1; 11–4; O	East Sekiwake #1; 10–5; O	East Sekiwake #1; 9–6	West Sekiwake #1; 11–4–P; F
1997	East Sekiwake #1; 6–9	East Maegashira #1; 12–3–P; O★★	East Sekiwake #1; 7–5–3	West Komusubi #1; Sat out due to injury 0–0–15	West Komusubi #1; 3–8–4	West Maegashira #3; 8–7
1998	East Komusubi #1; 8–7	West Komusubi #1; 8–7; O	West Sekiwake #1; 7–8	West Komusubi #1; 7–8	East Maegashira #1; 7–8 ★	West Maegashira #1; 8–7 ★★
1999	East Maegashira #1; 9–6	West Komusubi #2; 10–5	West Sekiwake #1; 12–3; F	East Sekiwake #1; 8–7	East Sekiwake #1; 9–6	East Sekiwake #1; 11–4; F
2000	East Sekiwake #1; 7–8	West Komusubi #1; 8–7	West Komusubi #1; 14–1; FO	East Sekiwake #1; 11–4; O	East Ōzeki #2; 11–4	East Ōzeki #1; 11–4
2001	East Ōzeki #1; 10–5	East Ōzeki #1; 13–2	East Ōzeki #1; 4–5–6	East Ōzeki #3; 13–2	East Ōzeki #1; 0–4–11	East Ōzeki #2; 10–5
2002	East Ōzeki #1; 9–6	West Ōzeki #2; 12–3	East Ōzeki #1; 11–4	East Ōzeki #1; 0–4–11	East Ōzeki #2; 12–3	East Ōzeki #1; 2–2–11
2003	East Ōzeki #3; Sat out due to injury 0–0–15	West Ōzeki #2; 10–5	West Ōzeki #1; 11–4	East Ōzeki #1; 12–3	East Ōzeki #1; 7–8	East Ōzeki #2; 10–5
2004	East Ōzeki #2; 10–5	West Ōzeki #1; 13–2	West Ōzeki #1; 10–5	East Ōzeki #1; 11–4	East Ōzeki #1; 13–2	East Ōzeki #1; 12–3
2005	East Ōzeki #1; 4–6–5	West Ōzeki #1; 10–5	East Ōzeki #1; 5–1–9	West Ōzeki #2; 10–5	East Ōzeki #1; 0–4–11	West Ōzeki #2; 10–5
2006	West Ōzeki #1; 3–6–6	West Ōzeki #2; 8–7	West Ōzeki #2; 9–6	East Ōzeki #2; 9–6	East Ōzeki #2; 1–6–8	West Ōzeki #3; 10–5
2007	East Ōzeki #2; 8–7	West Ōzeki #2; 8–7	East Ōzeki #2; 10–5	East Ōzeki #1; 8–5–2	East Ōzeki #2; 1–5–9	West Ōzeki #2; 9–6
2008	East Ōzeki #2; 8–7	East Ōzeki #2; 8–7	West Ōzeki #1; 8–7	East Ōzeki #2; 9–6	East Ōzeki #2; 9–6	West Ōzeki #1; 1–3–11
2009	West Ōzeki #2; 8–7	East Ōzeki #2; 8–7	East Ōzeki #2; 8–7	East Ōzeki #2; 8–7	West Ōzeki #2; 8–7	West Ōzeki #2; 8–7
2010	West Ōzeki #2; 9–6	East Ōzeki #2; 8–7	West Ōzeki #2; 9–6	West Ōzeki #3; 6–5–4	West Ōzeki #2; 8–7	West Ōzeki #2; 12–3
2011	East Ōzeki #1; 9–6	West Ōzeki #1; Tournament Cancelled; Match fixing investigation 0–0–0	West Ōzeki #1; 9–6	East Ōzeki #2; Retired; 3–8	x	x
Record given as wins–losses–absences Top division champion Top division runner-up Retired Lower divisions Non-participation Sanshō key: F=Fighting spirit; O=Outstanding performance; T=Technique Also shown: ★=Kinboshi; P=Playoff(s); Divisions: Makuuchi — Jūryō — Makushita — Sandanme — Jonidan — Jonokuchi Makuuchi ranks: Yokozuna — Ōzeki — Sekiwake — Komusubi — Maegashira

== See also ==
- Glossary of sumo terms
- List of sumo record holders
- List of sumo tournament top division champions
- List of sumo tournament top division runners-up
- List of past sumo wrestlers
- List of sumo elders
- List of ōzeki
