= Asōfuji Seiya =

Japanese sumo wrestler

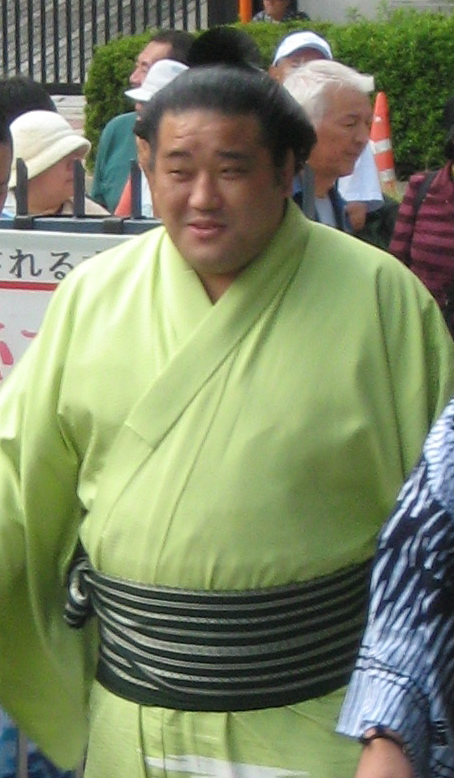

Personal information
- Native name: 安壮富士 清也
- Born: Kiyotoshi Suginomori; January 17, 1976 (age 50) Fukaura, Aomori, Japan
- Height: 1.80 m (5 ft 11 in)
- Weight: 125 kg (276 lb; 19.7 st)

Sport
- Sport: Sumo
- Retired: April 2011
- Heya: Isegahama
- Record: 517-478-7
- Debut: January 1994
- Highest rank: Maegashira 13 (November 2006)
- Championships: 1 (Jonidan)
- Updated on Jan 2011

Asōfuji Seiya (born January 17, 1976, as Kiyotoshi Suginomori) is a retired sumo wrestler from Fukaura, Nishitsugaru, Aomori, Japan. His highest rank was maegashira 13. He is the elder brother of Aminishiki.

== Career ==
Asōfuji made his professional debut in January 1994. He joined Ajigawa stable, run by former yokozuna Asahifuji, who was also of Nishitsugaru District and a cousin of Asōfuji's father. He took a long time to climb up the rankings, mainly due to his relatively light weight (barely 100 kg). He was outperformed by his younger brother Aminishiki, who, though he joined the stable three years after Asōfuji, had already reached sekitori status by 2000. Asōfuji first reached the second highest jūryō division in September 2003, but lasted only one tournament before being demoted back to the third makushita division. He reappeared in the second division a year later, and in November 2006 he finally made his top makuuchi division debut at the age of 30. He was the ninth oldest makuuchi debutant since the end of World War II. In that tournament, there were three sets of brothers (Asofuji and Aminishiki, Kitazakura and Toyozakura, and Rohō and Hakurozan) in the top division simultaneously for the first and only time in sumo history. Asōfuji could manage only a 6-9 score in his top division debut, and only four wins in the next tournament in January 2007.

He fell back to the jūryō division for the March 2007 tournament and a 4-11 record in July sent him right to the bottom of the division. He held onto sekitori status with an 8-7 mark in September but could manage only five wins in January 2008 and fell back to makushita. He managed a 5-2 score in the March 2008 tournament which returned him immediately to the second division, but again he was unable to secure kachi-koshi (more wins than losses) and was demoted to makushita once more. He scored 5-2 again in July for another immediate return to jūryō for the September tournament, but fell back to the third division yet again, narrowly missing the kachi-koshi with a 7-8 score. However, a fine 6-1 score at the top makushita ranking in November 2008 ensured his return to the sekitori ranks once again. This was his sixth promotion to jūryō, putting him in equal third place on the all-time list. He remained in the jūryō division for the rest of his career, although he never won more than nine bouts in a tournament.

== Retirement from sumo ==
Asōfuji was one of 23 wrestlers found guilty of fixing the result of bouts after an investigation by the Japan Sumo Association, and ordered to retire in April 2011. He considered filing a lawsuit against his dismissal, but chose to hand in his retirement papers on April 4. His danpatsu-shiki or official retirement ceremony was held at the Ryōgoku Kokugikan on May 29, 2011. After reportedly considering a career in mixed martial arts, he was hired privately by Isegahama stable as a trainer.

In May 2022 the former Asofuji attended his brother's retirement ceremony, exactly eleven years after his own. As of 2022 he was working as a manager for an industrial waste disposal company.

== Fighting style ==
Asōfuji had a weight disadvantage against most of his competitors in the sekitori ranks, and had to rely on his technical skill. Among his favourite techniques were nage, or throws. His most common winning move over the six tournaments from July 2007 to May 2008 was uwatedashinage, or "pulling outer-arm throw", but he was also adept at shitatenage, or inner-arm throws.

== Family ==
Asōfuji was married in December 2006.

== Career record ==
Asōfuji Seiya
| Year | January Hatsu basho, Tokyo | March Haru basho, Osaka | May Natsu basho, Tokyo | July Nagoya basho, Nagoya | September Aki basho, Tokyo | November Kyūshū basho, Fukuoka |
|---|---|---|---|---|---|---|
| 1994 | (Maezumo) | West Jonokuchi #49; 4–3 | East Jonidan #177; 6–1 | East Jonidan #84; 6–1 | East Jonidan #14; 7–0–PP; Champion | East Sandanme #27; 2–5 |
| 1995 | West Sandanme #53; 3–4 | East Sandanme #71; 4–3 | West Sandanme #50; 3–4 | West Sandanme #65; 6–1 | East Sandanme #15; 4–3 | East Sandanme #3; 3–4 |
| 1996 | West Sandanme #17; 4–3 | East Sandanme #6; 1–6 | East Sandanme #46; 3–4 | East Sandanme #65; 6–1 | East Sandanme #15; 4–3 | West Sandanme #2; 3–4 |
| 1997 | West Sandanme #19; 3–4 | West Sandanme #34; 5–2 | East Sandanme #11; 5–2 | West Makushita #45; 3–4 | West Sandanme #1; 6–1 | East Makushita #32; 4–3 |
| 1998 | West Makushita #24; 5–2 | East Makushita #12; 2–5 | East Makushita #24; 3–4 | West Makushita #33; 5–2 | East Makushita #20; 3–4 | West Makushita #26; 3–4 |
| 1999 | West Makushita #36; Sat out due to injury 0–0–7 | East Sandanme #16; 6–1 | West Makushita #43; 5–2 | East Makushita #28; 4–3 | East Makushita #20; 2–5 | West Makushita #31; 5–2 |
| 2000 | West Makushita #19; 3–4 | West Makushita #28; 5–2 | West Makushita #15; 4–3 | West Makushita #10; 3–4 | West Makushita #16; 2–5 | West Makushita #28; 5–2 |
| 2001 | West Makushita #15; 3–4 | East Makushita #25; 4–3 | East Makushita #21; 3–4 | West Makushita #30; 5–2 | West Makushita #16; 5–2 | West Makushita #9; 3–4 |
| 2002 | West Makushita #13; 1–6 | West Makushita #32; 5–2 | East Makushita #17; 4–3 | East Makushita #11; 3–4 | West Makushita #16; 6–1 | East Makushita #4; 3–4 |
| 2003 | West Makushita #8; 3–4 | West Makushita #14; 4–3 | East Makushita #10; 6–1 | East Makushita #2; 4–3 | West Jūryō #12; 5–10 | West Makushita #4; 3–4 |
| 2004 | East Makushita #7; 4–3 | West Makushita #3; 2–5 | West Makushita #14; 5–2 | West Makushita #3; 6–1 | West Jūryō #12; 6–9 | West Makushita #1; 6–1 |
| 2005 | East Jūryō #9; 9–6 | West Jūryō #3; 6–9 | West Jūryō #6; 6–9 | East Jūryō #9; 7–8 | East Jūryō #10; 7–8 | West Jūryō #10; 9–6 |
| 2006 | West Jūryō #5; 8–7 | East Jūryō #4; 8–7 | East Jūryō #3; 7–8 | West Jūryō #3; 9–6 | East Jūryō #1; 8–7 | East Maegashira #13; 6–9 |
| 2007 | East Maegashira #15; 4–11 | East Jūryō #7; 6–9 | West Jūryō #10; 8–7 | West Jūryō #7; 4–11 | East Jūryō #14; 8–7 | West Jūryō #12; 8–7 |
| 2008 | West Jūryō #10; 5–10 | East Makushita #3; 5–2 | West Jūryō #13; 6–9 | West Makushita #2; 5–2 | East Jūryō #14; 7–8 | East Makushita #1; 6–1 |
| 2009 | East Jūryō #11; 7–8 | West Jūryō #13; 9–6 | East Jūryō #10; 9–6 | West Jūryō #4; 6–9 | East Jūryō #8; 9–6 | East Jūryō #3; 6–9 |
| 2010 | East Jūryō #6; 8–7 | East Jūryō #4; 7–8 | East Jūryō #6; 6–9 | West Jūryō #9; 7–8 | East Jūryō #10; 8–7 | East Jūryō #4; 6–9 |
| 2011 | East Jūryō #8; 8–7 | Tournament Cancelled; 0–0–0 | East Jūryō #7; Retired – | x | x | x |
Record given as wins–losses–absences Top division champion Top division runner-up Retired Lower divisions Non-participation Sanshō key: F=Fighting spirit; O=Outstanding performance; T=Technique Also shown: ★=Kinboshi; P=Playoff(s); Divisions: Makuuchi — Jūryō — Makushita — Sandanme — Jonidan — Jonokuchi Makuuchi ranks: Yokozuna — Ōzeki — Sekiwake — Komusubi — Maegashira

== See also ==
- Glossary of sumo terms
- List of past sumo wrestlers
