= Nakamura Keith Haring Collection =

Biographical museum in Japan

Coordinates: 35.88756°N 138.31863°E

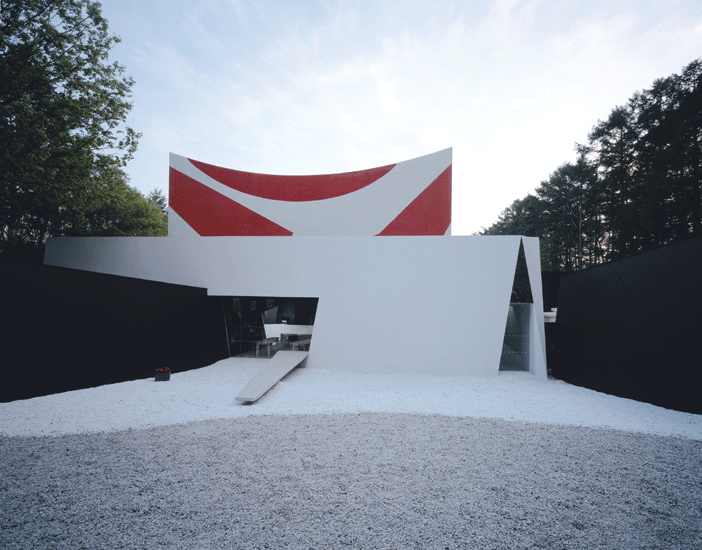
Nakamura Keith Haring Collection in Yamanashi Prefecture, Japan

Nakamura Keith Haring Collection is a private museum collection of American artist Keith Haring artworks, located in the city of Hokuto, Yamanashi Prefecture of Japan. The museum is the only one in the world dedicated to the work of Keith Haring. The collection is housed in an award-winning museum building, created in 2007 by architect Atsushi Kitagawara, and exhibits the collection of Kazuo Nakamura, CEO of CMIC Group.

In November 2024, Ukrainian-born sumo wrestler Aonishiki was presented with a keshō-mawashi following negotiations between Kazuo Nakamura (director of the collection), a patron of Ajigawa stable, and the Keith Haring Foundation. The apron features Keith Haring's work "Earth, World", originally created in 1985 during the Cold War, representing a desire for world peace supported by people of different races and nationalities, echoing the war in Ukraine and a desire for world peace.

== See also ==
- List of single-artist museums
