= Atsushi Kitagawara =

Japanese architect (born 1951)

Atsushi Kitagawara (北川原 温, Kitagawara Atsushi; born 1951) is a Japanese architect.

== Biography ==
Atsushi Kitagawara was born in Nagano Prefecture, Japan. While studying for a BA in architecture at Tokyo National University of Fine Arts and Music he won first prize in the Japan Architect International Design Competition. He graduated in 1974 and proceeded to a master's degree at the same institution, participating in an urban design project while attending graduate school. He began working as an architect in 1975, and in 1982 founded his own firm Atsushi Kitagawara Architects, Inc. He was in 2005 appointed Professor at the Tokyo National University of Fine Arts and Music.

Since beginning work in his twenties Kitagawara has undertaken architectural projects, urban planning, landscape design, furniture and stage design (including "One of a Kind" for Jiri Kylian, choreographer and artistic director of the Netherlands Dance Theatre). His concepts and methods draw on fields including poetry, music and contemporary arts. He has won a number of awards, including the Architectural Institute of Japan Award in 2002, the first prize in the Innovative Architecture International Award (Italy) in 2006, the Grand-Prix in the Kenneth Brown Architecture Design Award in 2007, the Murano Togo Prize, the AIA Japan Professional Honor Award in 2008, Top Prize of JIA Grand Prix in 2009, and the Japan Art Academy Prize in 2010.

As of 2008 he works extensively outside Japan, including from his atelier in Europe. He also teaches at the Tokyo National University of Fine Arts and Music and practices along with associates at Atsushi Kitagawara Architects. In 2019, Kitagawara became a professor emeritus of Tokyo University of the Arts.

Atsushi style is artistically shaped and expressionistic, which celebrates the experience of space, without losing sight of the functional requirements. Through numerous award-winning projects, such as the Nakamura Keith Haring Museum, he is constantly exploring new means of construction, composition and usage of materials. He thereby creates complex spatial structures and façades, which challenge the conventional viewing patterns of the user, whilst never diminishing the human criteria.

In 2025, Kitagawara’s major solo exhibition titled "Atsushi Kitagawara: Constellations of Time and Space" is open at the Nakamura Keith Haring Collection Art Museum, a museum he designed, in Yamanashi, Japan. In the same year, Atsushi Kitagawara Architects has been reorganized to MET Team Architects with Kitagawara serving as a fellow.

== Awards ==
First Prize of "The Japan Architect" International Design Competition, Yoshioka Award /1973

Newcomer Prize, Japan Institute of Architects /1991(Metroça)

Tokyo Architectural Award /1994 (Higashi Nihonbashi Police Box)

Gold Medal, Good Design Award /1995(ARIA)

Japan Society for Finishing Technology Award /1997(ARIA)

Premium Award, Architectural Institute of Japan /1997(ARIA)

Kumamoto Landscape Award /1999(Uki Shiranuhi Library and Art Museum)

Japan Federation of Architects and Building Engineers Associations Award /2000(Ueda Municipal County Culture House)

Bessie Award (New York Dance and Performance Award) /2000

Architectural Institute of Japan Award /2000(Big Palette Fukushima)

Library Architecture Award of J.L.A. (Japan Library Association) /2001(Uki Shiranuhi Library and Art Museum)

Premium Award, Architectural Institute of Japan /2002(Uki Shiranuhi Library and Art Museum)

Canada Green Design Award /2002(Gifu Academy of Forest Science and Culture) Building Contractors Society Award /2002 (Gifu Academy of Forest Science and Culture)

Architectural Institute of Japan Award /2002 (Gifu Academy of Forest Science and Culture)

Eco-Build Award /2002(Gifu Academy of Forest Science and Culture)

Ministry of Agriculture, Forestry and Fisheries Award / 2003 (Kino-kuni Site Sight Information Pavilion)

Gold Medal, Arcasia Award /2003(Gifu Academy of Forest Science and Culture)

First Prize, Innovative Architecture International Award, Italy /2006 (Kaisho Forest View tube) (Kino-kuni Site Sight Information Pavilion)(Hida Beef Cattle Memorial Museum)

Special Prize, Public Architectural Award /2006(Gifu Academy of Forest Science and Culture)

Grand-Prix, Kenneth Brown Architecture Design Award / 2007(Gifu Academy of Forest Science and Culture)

Architectural Culture Award of Yamanashi-pref / 2007(Nakamura Keith Haring Collection Art Museum)

Togo Murano Award / 2008 (Nakamura Keith Haring Collection Art Museum)

AIA Japan Professional Honor Award / 2008 (Nakamura Keith Haring Collection Art Museum)

Toshima Streetscape Award Grand Prix / 2009 (Toshima Gakuin High School)

Top Prize of JIA Grand Prix / 2009 (Nakamura Keith Haring Collection Art Museum)

The Japan Art Academy Prize / 2010 (Nakamura Keith Haring Collection Art Museum)

Architectural Institute of Japan Award /2011(Inariyama Special Education School)

Building Contractors Society Award /2011(Inariyama Special Education School)

== Works ==
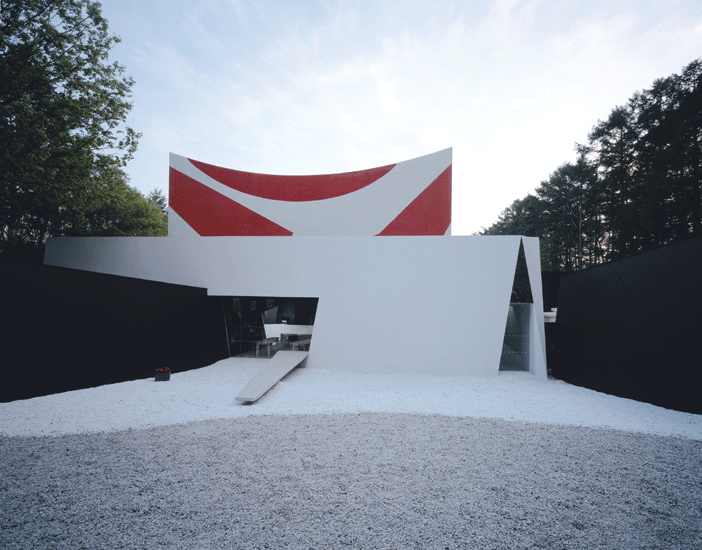
Nakamura Keith Haring Collection Art Museum

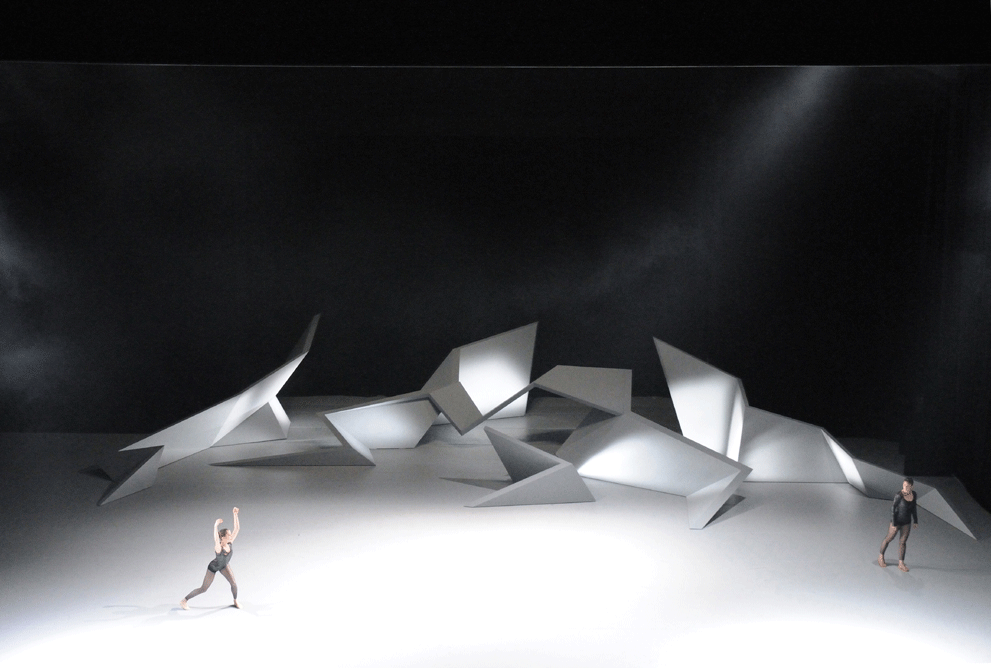
NDT One of a kind

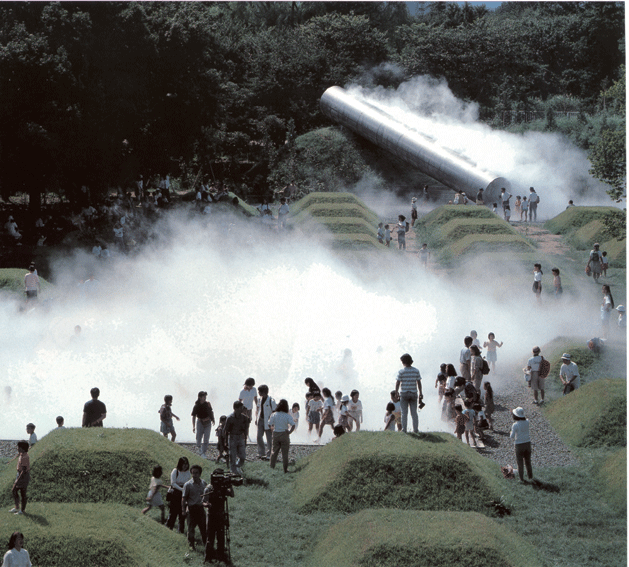
“Fog Forest” Showa Emperor’s National Memorial Park」

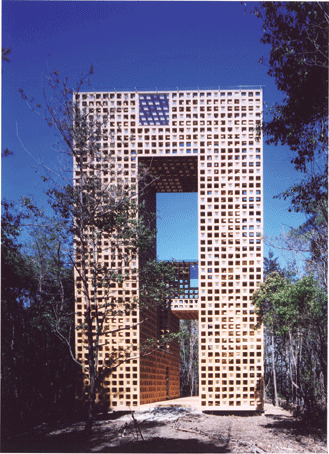
Kaisho Forest View tube

1985 Kaita MURAYAMA Memorial Art Museum

1985 “Rise” Cinema Theater

1986 Miaon-Kaku

1986 395

1988 Mesa

1988 Cloudy Spoon

1989 Metrotour / Awajicho Building

1989 Metroça

1989 Vasara

1990 Saint-Loco

1991 Metrotristan

1992 Higashi Nihonbashi Police Box

1992 “Fog Forest” Showa Emperor’s National Memorial Park

1993 Chuken, tea ceremony space

1994 Annex of Ikegami Industry Inc.

1994 Iwaki New Town Center

1997 Santaria Church

1997 Ueda Municipal County Culture House

1997 Sendenkaigi Headquarters

1998 Big Palette Fukushima

1998・1999・2000 One of a kind (NDT- performed worldwide/ Opera Garunie in Paris, NY Lincoln Center)

1998 Tsuyama Region Center

1998 Hakone Public Rest House of Minato-ku

1999 Toshima Gakuin High School, phase1

1999 Uki Shiranui Library and Art Museum

2001 Kino-Kuni Site Sight Information Pavilion

2001 Gifu Academy of Forest Science and Culture

2002 Daigaku-Megane Laboratory Corp. Building

2002 ARS GAllery

2002 Hida Beef Cattle Memorial Museum

2002 Japan P.E.N. Club Headquarters

2003 Toshima Gakuin High School, phase2

2003 Sasebo Shinminato Liner Terminal

2003 Imperial Palace Outer Garden Rest House

2004 Showa Tetsudo High School

2004 ARIA

2004 Villa Esterio

2005 Kaisho Forest View tube

2005 C’BON Headquarters

2006 Midori Headquarters

2007 Inariyama Special Education School

2007 Nakamura Keith Haring Collection Art Museum

2007 Akasaka Phoenix

2008 One of a kind (Opéra National de Lyon)

2009 ARCA

2009 Sendenkaigi Nishiwaseda building

2010 CANITTE

== Books ==
Modern Architecture / Space and method 7 - Atsushi Kitagawara, Doho-sha, 1986

Atsushi Kitagawara, JA vol.8: The Japan Architect, Shinkennchiku-sha, 1992

Atsushi Kitagawara and Koichi Inakoshi Archigraph 2: photographic monologue, TOTO Publications, 1993
