= Aonishiki Arata =

Ukrainian sumo wrestler (born 2004)

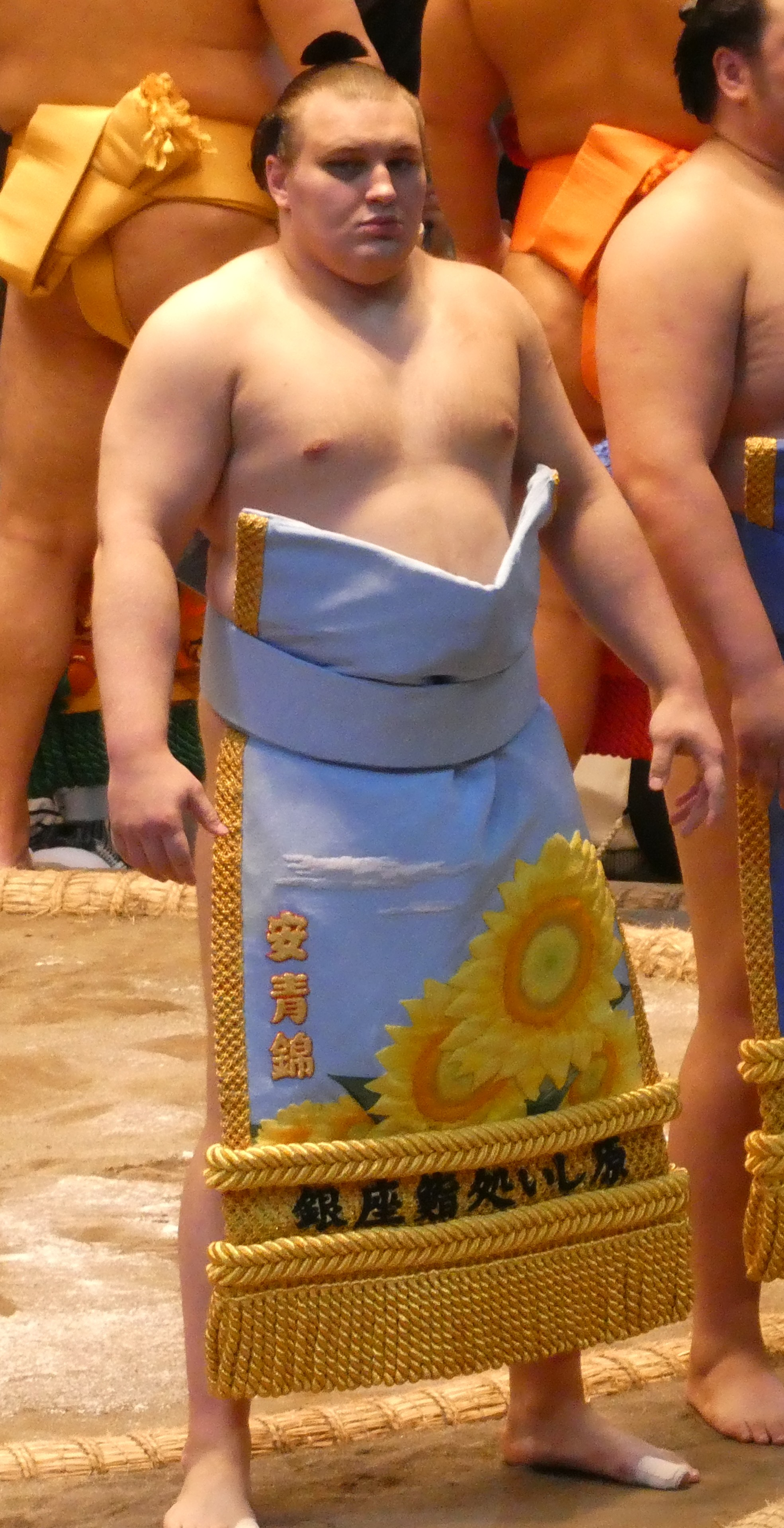
- Aonishiki in July 2025

Personal information
- Native name: 安青錦 新大
- Born: Danylo Yavhusishyn; March 23, 2004 (age 22) Vinnytsia, Vinnytsia Oblast, Ukraine
- Height: 1.82 m (5 ft 11 1/2 in)
- Weight: 142 kg (313 lb; 22.4 st)

Sport
- Sport: Sumo
- Rank: see below
- Heya: Ajigawa
- Debut: September 2023
- Highest rank: Ōzeki (January 2026)
- Championships: 3 (Makuuchi); 1 (Jonidan); 1 (Jonokuchi)
- Special Prizes: Fighting Spirit (2); Outstanding Performance (1); Technique (4)
- Gold Stars: 1 Hōshōryū
- Updated on July 29, 2026

Medal record

Men's Sumo

Representing Ukraine

Junior World Sumo Championships
Bronze medal – third place	2019, Osaka (Osaka) Japan	100 kg

European Sumo Championships
Gold medal – first place	2019, Tallinn, Estonia	-92 kg

Ukraine National Sumo Championship
Gold medal – first place	2021, Melitopol	100 kg
Gold medal – first place	2021, Melitopol	Openweight
Gold medal – first place	2021, Melitopol	Team

Aonishiki Arata (Japanese: 安青錦 新大; born March 23, 2004 as Danylo Yavhusishyn Ukrainian: Данило Явгусішин) is a Ukrainian professional sumo wrestler from Vinnytsia, Vinnytsia Oblast. He is the second Ukrainian to become a professional sumo wrestler, after Shishi in 2020. He wrestles for Ajigawa stable, at his highest rank, ōzeki, which was the fastest promotion to the rank since the modern six-tournament schedule was introduced in 1958, accomplishing the feat in just 14 tournaments. He would then soon lose and immediately regain the rank over the course of the July 2026 tournament.

Aonishiki has posted double-digit wins in each of his first eight tournaments at sekitori status. In the top division, he won 11 matches in each of his first four tournaments before earning a top division title on his fifth and sixth tournaments at that level of competition. Aonishiki earned a special prize in each of his first five top division tournaments, also earning a kinboshi on his third tournament.

== Early life and sumo background ==
Yavhusishyn started sumo at the age of seven, and placed third at the 2019 Junior World Sumo Championships. He also has a freestyle wrestling and judo background. He was inspired to try sumo after his seniors set up a sumo ring in his club. His interest grew thanks to the fast pace of the matches, which appealed to him.

Yavhusishyn continued practicing sumo and won three gold medals at the Ukrainian national championships at the age of 17, with an unbeaten record. At the same age, he finished ninth at the 2021 World Cadets Wrestling Championships in the Men's 110.0 kg category. At one point, he wondered about his professional future when the idea of becoming a professional wrestler took root in him after seeing an online video of the match between yokozuna Takanohana and then-ōzeki Asashōryū during the 2002 Autumn Tournament.

Yavhusishyn was accepted by a Ukrainian university, but because of the Russian invasion of Ukraine in February 2022, he decided to leave his country, first seeking refuge in Germany before arriving in Japan in April of the same year, using the friendship he had forged with Arata Yamanaka, Kansai University sumo club captain, an older amateur sumo wrestler with whom Yavhusishyn met at the 2019 Junior World Sumo Championships. In Japan, he was hosted at Yamanaka's apartment in Kobe (Hyōgo Prefecture), where his host family spent their own money so that he could stay in Japan in the best possible conditions, helping him to cope with homesickness and loneliness, with Yavhusishyn calling them his "Japanese family".

Yavhusishyn trained with the sumo clubs of Kansai University and Hōtoku Gakuen High School (Yamanaka's alma mater), despite not having student status. During this period, it was noticed that Yavhusishyn was already at a much higher level than his university counterparts, notably winning several matches against future Isegahama stable's wrestler Toshinofuji, while the latter was competing at Doshisha University after immigrating to Japan. Yavhusishyn maintains a friendship with the club, by which he is nicknamed "Danya".

Through Kansai University sumo clubs, Yavhusishyn was introduced to Ajigawa (the former Aminishiki). In December 2022, Yavhusishyn was formally accepted as one of Ajigawa stable's first recruits. Initially, Ajigawa was reluctant to recruit Yavhusishyn, initially not wishing to recruit foreign wrestlers (subject to recruitment restrictions) and concerned about the cultural and language barrier, but gave in to the young wrestler's determination.

== Professional debut ==
=== Early career ===
Yavhusishyn officially joined Ajigawa stable's training camp before the July 2023 tournament, and took the new apprentice examination. After obtaining a work visa, he made his debut in the September tournament of the same year. He was given the shikona Aonishiki Arata (安青錦 新大), a ring name created by merging the kanji for the color blue (青), referring to the Ukrainian flag, and the kanji meaning calm (安) and brocade (錦), from his master's own ring name (安美錦). He himself chose to bear the first name Arata (新大), as it is that of Arata Yamanaka (山中新大), the former captain and now coach of the Kansai University sumo club that helped him find refuge in Japan. Asked about this choice, Aonishiki replied "now I feel like we're fighting together".

During his first professional tournament, Aonishiki won the jonokuchi division. At that point, he brought only the second championship to his stable after his stablemate Anōsho also won this division in July 2023. In January 2024, he claimed his second championship with the jonidan division, after a playoff against Kokonoe stable's Chiyotaiko. In March 2024 tournament he was promoted to sandanme, but after six consecutive wins, he lost to Kise stable's Nagamura in his last match for the tournament, ending his 20 bout winning streak since his debut. For the May tournament he was promoted to makushita and finished with a 6–1 record. During the September tournament of the same year, Aonishiki rose to the top of the makushita division, and after the tournament it was reported that his score of 6–1 would normally be enough for promotion to the jūryō division. His promotion for the November tournament was confirmed after the post-tournament ranking meeting.

=== Jūryō promotion ===
Aonishiki is the first wrestler raised by former Aminishiki to reach sekitori status since the founding of his stable. He is also the second wrestler from Ukraine (after Shishi) to reach this rank, and the fifth fastest promotion since the introduction of the six-tournament system in 1958 after his debut (excluding tsukedashi system).

At the press conference for jūryō promotions, he admitted to being inspired by his country's results at the 2024 Summer Olympics, adding that he absolutely wanted to avoid showing an embarrassing level of sportsmanship. He also commented that, "My master was promoted to jūryō at the age of 21. I wanted to make sure I didn't lose to him". During his first jūryō tournament, Aonishiki recorded a double digit record. Even though he is not a graduate from Kansai University, he was presented with a keshō-mawashi by the university, because he trained there before his professional debut. Another keshō-mawashi was presented to him following negotiations between one of his patrons, the president of the Nakamura Keith Haring Collection in Hokuto, Yamanashi. The apron features Keith Haring's work "Earth, World", originally created in 1985 during the Cold War, representing a desire for world peace supported by people of different races and nationalities, echoing the war in Ukraine and a desire for world peace.

During the 2025 January tournament, Aonishiki established himself as one of the leaders of the competition, rivalled also by Shishi, the only other Ukrainian wrestler in professional sumo. On Day 12, the two wrestlers faced off in the first match with two Ukrainian wrestlers in the history of the sport, with Shishi emerging victorious from the clash and taking sole leadership of the competition. Although Aonishiki failed to win the championship, he solidified his chances of being promoted to makuuchi, sumo's top division, for the March tournament. After the tournament, Aonishiki was perceived by the press as the only European wrestler capable of reaching the top of the sport's hierarchy, despite the performances of his elder Shishi.

== Makuuchi ==
=== Up and comer ===
Aonishiki was officially promoted to the top division for the 2025 March tournament. This tied him with both Takerufuji and the former Jōkōryū as the fastest to be promoted from debut to the top division, doing so in nine tournaments. Coinciding with his promotion, his compatriot Shishi's return to the top division also makes their country, Ukraine, the seventh foreign country to have two makuuchi-ranked wrestlers in the history of professional sumo.

Aonishiki downplayed the significance of this achievement, telling reporters: "I've just been following my stablemaster's instructions." He added that he wanted to give a strong performance, and would aim for double-digit wins and a special prize (sanshō) in his makuuchi debut.

During the tournament, Aonishiki qualified as one of the most competent wrestlers, holding on to just three defeats until the twelfth day, recording a series of seven consecutive victories in the process. On Day 6, he triumphed over his compatriot Shishi in the first makuuchi match between two Ukrainians in the history of the sport, claiming revenge on the latter after his jūryō championship loss in January. On the final day, Aonishiki won his match against sekiwake Ōhō, earning his eleventh victory by kirikaeshi ('twisting backward knee trip'). For his performance in the tournament, which ended on his birthday, Aonishiki was awarded the Fighting Spirit prize, becoming the second wrestler to win such an award in the shortest time, behind Takerufuji.

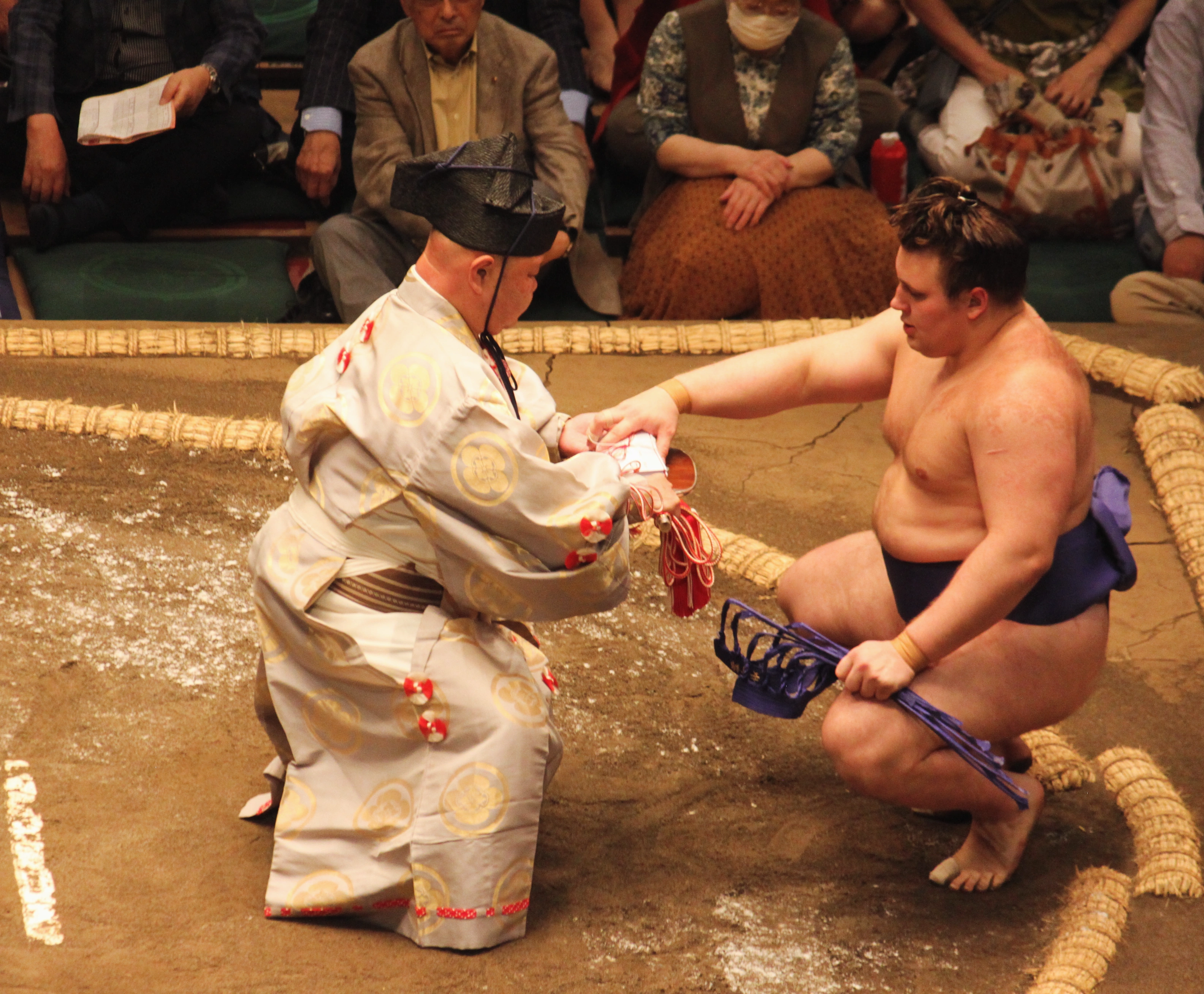
Aonishiki during the 2025 May tournament.

During the 2025 May tournament, Aonishiki stood out as one of the leaders of the competition, recording seven victories and one defeat during the first half of the tournament, sharing the lead group after undefeated ōzeki Ōnosato with Wakatakakage and Hakuōhō. Aonishiki's winning streak came to an end, however, when he was defeated by komusubi Wakatakakage, a wrestler he admires, effectively taking him out of the title race with two defeats behind the tournament leader. Although he struggled against the top-ranked wrestlers of the banzuke (losing to sekiwake Daieishō and ōzeki Kotozakura), Aonishiki finished his second tournament with an eleventh victory, winning his second Fighting Spirit special prize after his victory over Sadanoumi. After his performances in his first two makuuchi tournaments, Aonishiki drew attention to a potential promotion to the san'yaku ranks for the July tournament. He just missed out on this potential promotion, instead being elevated to the top maegashira rank for July.

During the 2025 July tournament in Nagoya, Aonishiki earned his first ever career kinboshi on the third day by defeating yokozuna Hōshōryū. This occurred in Aonishiki's 12th professional tournament, which set a new speed record for the fastest wrestler in the history of the six-tournament system (established in 1958) to get their first gold star. The previous record was 14 tournaments, which was set by former ōzeki Konishiki in 1984 and matched by Tomokaze in 2019. By the midway point of the tournament he was one win off the lead, having won five matches against seven opponents ranked at komusubi or higher. On Day 11 he moved into a share of the tournament lead. He dropped out of the lead when he was defeated in his Day 14 contest by new maegashira Kusano, and was defeated by leader Kotoshoho himself the following day, who claimed his first top-division tournament as a result. Aonishiki was awarded runner-up in a five-way tie with Atamifuji, Kusano (who had also lost on the final day), Ōnosato, and Tamawashi, also earning the Technique prize. Prior to the start of the July tournament, NHK released a documentary on Aonishiki titled Blue Whirlwind: A Ukrainian sumo wrestler.

In September 2025, Aonishiki was promoted to the rank of komusubi. With his promotion, he became the first Ukrainian to be promoted to san'yaku, as well as the first san'yaku competitor for Ajigawa stable. Having been promoted to komusubi in 12 tournaments, Aonishiki also set a new record for the fastest promotion to san'yaku since the introduction of the six-tournament system in 1958 (except wrestlers who entered sumo by way of tsukedashi), beating the 14 tournament record jointly held by former yokozuna Asashōryū and former ōzeki Konishiki and Kotoōshū. His promotion also makes him the third wrestler in sumo history (excluding tsukedashi), after Akebono and Kotoōshū, to be promoted to the san'yaku ranks without ever having recorded more losses than wins since debut in the jonokuchi division. During this tournament, he achieved on Day 9 his 100th victory since turning professional, becoming the fastest wrestler (excluding tsukedashi system) to reach this milestone since his debut, since the introduction of the seven-day tournament system for wrestlers in makushita and below in 1960. Aonishiki finished the tournament with eleven wins, his fourth consecutive tournament in makuuchi with this score. For his performances, he was awarded the Technique Prize for the second consecutive tournament.

=== Bid to ōzeki and first top-division championship ===
Aonishiki was promoted to the rank of sekiwake for the November tournament, once again setting some notable and historical achievements. In addition to being the first sekiwake wrestler for his stable and the first sekiwake wrestler from Ukraine, he was promoted to sekiwake in 13 tournaments, the fastest of any wrestler in modern sumo history (excluding tsukedashi competitors). This bested the previous record of 14 tournaments set by Konishiki. Additionally, he became the first new sekiwake since the 64th yokozuna Akebono in 1991 to secure winning records in every tournament while climbing from the bottom jonokuchi division to sumo's third-highest rank. Aonishiki told reporters after his sekiwake promotion that he was surprised and never imagined he would get this far, but wanted to aim even higher.

With a fourth consecutive tournament with a score of eleven wins, several comments emerged about a potential promotion to the rank of ōzeki after the November tournament. More specifically, sumo commentator Yasuo Fuji expressed expectations for the wrestler, highlighting the lack of a second ōzeki on the banzuke, his lack of make-koshi throughout his career, and his recent victory over yokozuna Hōshōryū. Regarding the promotion, the head of the Judging Department, Takadagawa (the former Akinoshima), commented that it might be too early, as normally the starting point for a promotion is the first tournament in the san'yaku ranks, but leaving open the question as to what score Aonishiki would achieve in November; while Kumegawa (the former Kotoinazuma), another judge, commented that he would consider Aonishiki a potential candidate for promotion after November.

During the tournament, he won his ninth victory on the tenth day in his match against Tamawashi, the oldest wrestler in the top division, who began his sumo career two months before Aonishiki was born. This match turned out to be the clash with the biggest age gap between competitors since the war, with nineteen years, four months, and seven days between the two wrestlers. This record was then broken during the same tournament when Tamawashi faced Fujinokawa, with a twenty-one-year age difference between the two wrestlers. With ten wins, Aonishiki was one of the tournament leaders alongside the two yokozuna. He faced Ōnosato on the thirteenth day. The outcome of the match, which saw the yokozuna emerge victorious, was controversial because Aonishiki and Ōnosato appeared to touch the ground and the outside of the ring at the same time without a mono-ii being called, prompting a reaction from the former Mainoumi (then an NHK commentator) who argued that a debate should have taken place. For his part, chief judge Takadagawa (the former Akinoshima) argued that since Aonishiki was in the air, he was the designated loser. Aonishiki bounced back the following day, defeating yokozuna Hōshōryū (one of the wrestlers in contention for the title) for the third time in three career meetings. This also gave him his eleventh win, reaching the milestone of 33 wins in three tournaments normally required for promotion to the rank of ōzeki, and keeping him in the title race with Hōshōryū and Ōnosato. On the final day, Aonishiki defeated ōzeki Kotozakura, qualifying him for a playoff against yokozuna Hōshōryū. Aonishiki defeated the yokozuna, using an unconventional method in sumo by performing an Olympic wrestling quick duck under to get behind his opponent and bring him down by pressing on his knee.

Aonishiki became at 21 years and 8 months the fourth youngest wrestler in sumo history to win a makuuchi tournament and made Ukraine the sixth foreign nation to win the title (after the United States, Mongolia, Bulgaria, Estonia, and Georgia). With only fourteen tournaments since his debut, Aonishiki is also the second fastest wrestler (behind Takerufuji) to win a top division trophy (excluding the tsukedashi system). For his performances during the tournament, Aonishiki was awarded the prizes for Outstanding Performance and Technique, thus equaling Ōnosato's record of winning a prize in each of his first five makuuchi tournaments.

=== Promotion to ōzeki ===
Just after Aonishiki's victory on Day 14, it was reported that the Judging Department of the Sumo Association would hold an extraordinary meeting on the final day of the tournament to consider a recommendation for ōzeki promotion. After the tournament and Aonishiki's championship win, it was announced that the Judging Department formally issued their recommendation for promotion to chairman Hakkaku (the 61st yokozuna Hokutoumi), and that the Sumo Association board would meet on 26 November to discuss the promotion. When he was informed about this in the customary NHK victory ceremony interview, Aonishiki said that he was happy, "but there's one more rank above ōzeki" and he would be doing his best to get there. He also stated that he was nervous about his first playoff, saying: "I'm always a little nervous, but I was able to focus on my style of sumo."

On 26 November 2025 the full Sumo Association board, in a meeting at the Fukuoka Convention Center, unanimously approved Aonishiki's ōzeki promotion. In keeping with sumo custom, the board sent Asakayama (former ōzeki Kaiō) and Ōshima (former sekiwake Kyokutenhō) to Ajigawa stable's training facility in Kurume to personally inform Aonishiki of the promotion. Aonishiki accepted, saying that he would strive to live up to his new rank and "aim even higher."

Aonishiki's 14 tournaments from his debut to sumo's second-highest rank surpassed Kotoōshū's 19 tournaments for the fastest such promotion in modern sumo history, excluding tsukedashi competitors. The promotion also made him the fourth youngest wrestler to achieve this rank since the introduction of the six-tournament-a-year system (behind Takanohana, Kitanoumi, and Hakuhō). Furthermore, he is only the third wrestler in the history of the sport to earn promotion without ever suffering a make-koshi since his debut in jonokuchi (behind Musashiyama and Haguroyama) and the first to achieve this feat under the system of six tournaments per year. This promotion also makes him the first wrestler in 89 years (since Futabayama) to be directly promoted to the rank of ōzeki after winning a maiden makuuchi tournament as a newly promoted sekiwake.

Immediately after the announcement of Aonishiki's promotion, and following global attention on his achievements, it was announced that a French documentary film, produced by the same team that produced Les rêves ne meurent jamais (Dreams Never Die) about Yannick Bestaven, would go into production and be released in 2027. In December 2025 Empress Masako spoke about Aonishiki in her birthday message, saying that she was deeply moved by his story. The Empress referenced both Aonishiki and Japanese baseball player Shohei Ohtani, saying that the two gave courage and hope to many people by "opening up new possibilities through their daily efforts."

=== Second Emperor's Cup and yokozuna bid ===
Aonishiki got off to a strong start in his first tournament as an ōzeki, suffering only two losses by the halfway point of the tournament. On Day 8, although defeated by Kirishima, he was granted an audience with Emperor Naruhito, Empress Masako and Princess Aiko who had attended the day's matches. On Day 12 of the January tournament Aonishiki was seen wearing a different color of mawashi, having switched from the blue one that he had been wearing for several tournaments to a black one. The black mawashi was worn in past competition by his stablemaster Ajigawa (former sekiwake Aminishiki), and had recently been presented to him as a gift. It is reportedly considered rare for a sumo wrestler to change his belt in the middle of a tournament. Aonishiki said at the time that he always wanted to wear the belt if he had the chance, and that it would be a waste not to wear it. Entering the fifteenth and final day of competition, he and maegashira-ranked Atamifuji were tied with 11 wins each. After Atamifuji won his match, Aonishiki–for the second tournament in a row–defeated ōzeki Kotozakura to force a playoff. In the deciding contest, Aonishiki took down Atamifuji using a headlock throw after being pressured towards the outer edges of the dohyō. The championship made Aonishiki the first newly promoted ōzeki to win the Emperor's Cup since Hakuhō in May 2006, and also made him the first to achieve the feat of winning consecutive tournaments as a newly promoted sekiwake and a newly promoted ōzeki since Futabayama won consecutive tournaments in 1936 and 1937 (when only two tournaments were held per year). Aonishiki became a candidate for promotion to the sport's highest rank of yokozuna at the March 2026 tournament, a possibility if he were to secure another championship or an equivalent performance. Commenting after the tournament, Aonishiki said he felt relaxed that it was over because "every one of the 15 days was tense." Regarding the potential yokozuna promotion, Aonishiki said that if there was an opportunity, he wanted to grab it as soon as possible.

Aonishiki's yokozuna bid was put in jeopardy early on in the 2026 March tournament. By the end of the first week, he had already suffered four losses, leaving him virtually unable to win the championship. During the second week, Aonishiki managed to stay in contention with a 7–7 record by defeating Kirishima, though Kirishima still clinched the championship that day thanks to his lead in wins over his competitors in the title race. With Aonishiki aiming to finish with a winning record on the final day of the tournament, he absolutely had to win his last match against yokozuna Hōshōryū. Aonishiki lost the match by kakenage, recording the first negative record of his career and placing him in kadoban status for the May tournament.

=== Demotion, comeback to ōzeki and third Emperor's Cup ===
After the March 2026 tournament ended, it was revealed that Aonishiki had fractured the little toe on his left foot at some point during the tournament, also forcing Aonishiki to withdraw from the Spring Tour to focus on recovery. At first, his recovery was going well; as he was training regularly and planning to participate in the sōken training session taking place on May 1. On May 6, however, news reports indicated that Aonishiki had been injured again, this time during a training session at Arashio stable. According to reports, Aonishiki was thrown to the ground and was unable to get back up due to pain in his ankle, requiring medical assistance. It was later announced that he would withdraw from the May tournament due to this ankle injury. Because Aonishiki was kadoban from his losing record in March, his absence from the May tournament meant that demotion from ōzeki was a certainty. This was the first time he had ever withdrawn from a competition.

Aonishiki during the September 2026 tournament.

When the banzuke for the July tournament was unveiled, it was indeed confirmed that Aonishiki had been demoted to the rank of sekiwake. As sumo rules allow, he could regain his rank immediately for the September tournament by recording 10 wins. Before the tournament, Aonishiki and his master (the former sekiwake Aminishiki) made no secret of their hope not only to regain the rank of ōzeki but also to claim the championship. Aonishiki performed well early in the tournament, racking up three consecutive wins since the start of the tournament. On the fourth day, however, he suffered a loss to Yoshinofuji. The next day, he bounced back and won a match against Kotozakura. On the ninth and tenth days, he won his bouts against the two yokozuna, Ōnosato and Hōshōryū, respectively. Finally, on the eleventh day, Aonishiki earned his tenth victory against Gōnoyama (a match that attracted a small amount of controversy), stringing together seven consecutive wins and securing his return to the rank of ōzeki for the September tournament. This victory also ensured that he remained in the lead in the title race. This achievement makes Aonishiki the seventh wrestler to regain the rank of ōzeki by winning ten bouts after an immediate demotion to the rank of sekiwake (the first since Takakeishō in September 2019) and the tenth wrestler overall to regain that rank after being demoted from it. Before the start of the tournament's final day, it was announced that Aonishiki would receive a fourth special prize for Technique for his performance during the tournament. In the final bouts of the tournament, Aonishiki lost his match to Atamifuji, triggering a playoff involving the two wrestlers and Kirishima—a first in nine tournaments. Aonishiki defeated Atamifuji before beating Kirishima and winning his third title. This championship victory makes Aonishiki the first wrestler in the history of the sport to be demoted from the ōzeki rank, regain that rank in a single tournament, and win the championship in the process. Following repromotion to ōzeki, Aonishiki then joined the Summer Tour spanning August despite ongoing foot injury, engaging only in ritual, light exercise and fan interactions.

In September, Aonishiki got off to a rough start in the tournament, posting a 3–3 record on the sixth day. He nevertheless maintained his position among the contenders chasing Ōnosato, the tournament leader, recording eight consecutive victories, ultimately leading to a showdown for the championship on the final day. Ōnosato defeated Aonishiki by tsukidashi, leaving him with a score of 11–4.

During the November 2026 tournament, Aonishiki found himself in the difficult position of almost having a negative record after suffering his seventh loss to yokozuna Hōshōryū on the thirteenth day. The next day, he was defeated by the tournament leader, Wakamotoharu, putting him in a kadoban situation for the January 2027 tournament, the second time in his career. According to press reports, the reason for this poor performance is said to be a leg injury he sustained after his victory over fellow ōzeki Kirishima on the tenth day.

== Fighting style ==
Aonishiki's most common kimarite, or winning technique, is yori-kiri ('frontal force out'), and he prefers a migi-yotsu, or left hand outside, right hand inside grip on his opponent's mawashi.

Aonishiki does not have a large stature, but he makes up for this with his technical ability. In 2025, during his rise to the rank of ōzeki, he was on average 7 cm (3 in) shorter and 36 kg (79 lb; 5.7 st) lighter than other members of the top division.

Some commentators have stated that his mastery of hand positions and grappling techniques are the best that professional sumo has seen in the last ten years. This technical ability sets him apart from previous high-ranking wrestlers of European origin, who typically relied on their size and physical strength.

During the tachi-ai (initial charge), one of Aonishiki's trademarks is to keep his hips high, unlike more common techniques of starting the bout as low as possible. It was also noted that he possesses excellent stability, allowing him to stay low and gain advantage over his opponents by raising their center of gravity. This stability greatly reduces the chances of defeating him with hatakikomi ('slap down'), an occurrence that has happened only three times between his debut and his promotion to ōzeki, or hikiotoshi ('pull down'), with no occurrences. On this subject, Takekuma (the former Gōeidō), praised him saying "you can't slap him down". His low stance is even seen as a trap for his opponents, instinctively triggering them to attempt to throw him to the ground, leaving their bodies exposed and their arms too high.

Thanks to his technical skills, Aonishiki is often seen winning his fights with rare techniques, including kirikaeshi ('twisting backward knee trip'), okurinage ('rear throw down') and uchimusō ('inner thigh propping twist down'). This latter became known as his trademark, due to his ease in deploying it in a division where it is difficult to use and the significant victories he has achieved over higher-ranked opponents (such as Kotozakura II) thanks to it. When asked about his ease in using it, he replied that it was quite similar to what he knew from freestyle wrestling and that he enjoyed the destabilizing aspect of the technique.

Aonishiki also puts in great effort when trying to gain weight, and also works on his strength training, lifting weights of 200 kg (440 lb; 31 st) in the bench press. He is also known for his aptitude for fast, head-on attacks.

Since his amateur days, Aonishiki cites that he has been studying the style of wrestlers with the same build as himself, such as former yokozuna Wakanohana Masaru or his master (the former Aminishiki), one of the smallest yet recognized as one of the most technical wrestlers in the 2000s and early 2010s. He also studies the matches of former yokozuna Chiyonofuji. Aonishiki is also inspired by Wakatakakage, who helped him train in June 2024. Following Aonishiki's third straight 11-win tournament in the top division in July 2025, Kokonoe (former ōzeki Chiyotaikai) compared Aonishiki's style to that of Tamanoi (former ōzeki Tochiazuma) when he was climbing up the makuuchi ranks.

Aonishiki also received praise from Asakayama (the former Kaiō), who noted his dedication and desire to improve during practice sessions. Prior to Aonishiki's November 2025 tournament victory, Kokonoe commented that Aonishiki was a "true powerhouse". He noted that Aonishiki excelled in fights against yokozuna (referring to his perfect 3-for-3 record against Hōshōryū at the time of his remark), and said that he had never seen a wrestler rise through the top division ranks with such consistency.

== Personal life ==
Aonishiki has an older brother who stayed in Ukraine. Both his parents have refugee status and now live in Düsseldorf, Germany, where they manage a dry cleaning shop. When it came to deciding to move to Japan, Aonishiki was able to count on the support of his parents, who encouraged him to obtain a visa. Aonishiki was reunited with his parents for the first time since he left home when he invited them to the 2025 May tournament in Tokyo and again when the Japan Sumo Association held its exhibition tournament in Paris in June 2026.

Aonishiki is fluent in Ukrainian and Russian, and he speaks English at an intermediate level. At the time of his recruitment into the professional world, it was noted that Aonishiki had already become fluent in Japanese, which he learned after arriving in Japan.

== Career record ==
Aonishiki Arata
Year	January Hatsu basho, Tokyo	March Haru basho, Osaka	May Natsu basho, Tokyo	July Nagoya basho, Nagoya	September Aki basho, Tokyo	November Kyūshū basho, Fukuoka
2023	x	x	x	x	(Maezumō)	West Jonokuchi #14; 7–0; Champion
2024	East Jonidan #10; 7–0–P; Champion	East Sandanme #18; 6–1	East Makushita #40; 6–1	West Makushita #17; 6–1	West Makushita #4; 6–1	East Jūryō #11; 10–5
2025	West Jūryō #5; 12–3	East Maegashira #15; 11–4; F	East Maegashira #9; 11–4; F	East Maegashira #1; 11–4; T★	West Komusubi #1; 11–4; T	East Sekiwake #1; 12–3–P; OT
2026	West Ōzeki #1; 12–3–P	East Ōzeki #1; 7–8	West Ōzeki #1; Sat out due to injury 0–0–15	West Sekiwake #2; 12–3–PP; T	East Ōzeki #2; 11–4	East Ōzeki #1; 7–8
Record given as wins–losses–absences Top division champion Top division runner-up Retired Non-participation Jūryō Lower divisions Sanshō key: F=Fighting spirit; O=Outstanding performance; T=Technique Also shown: ★=Kinboshi; P=Playoff(s); Divisions: Makuuchi — Jūryō — Makushita — Sandanme — Jonidan — Jonokuchi Makuuchi ranks: Yokozuna — Ōzeki — Sekiwake — Komusubi — Maegashira

== See also ==
- Glossary of sumo terms
- List of active sumo wrestlers
- List of non-Japanese sumo wrestlers
- List of sumo record holders
- List of active gold star earners
- List of active special prize winners
- List of sumo top division champions
- List of sumo top division runners-up
- List of ōzeki
