= Aminishiki Ryūji =

Japanese sumo wrestler (born 1978)

安美錦 竜児 Aminishiki Ryūji
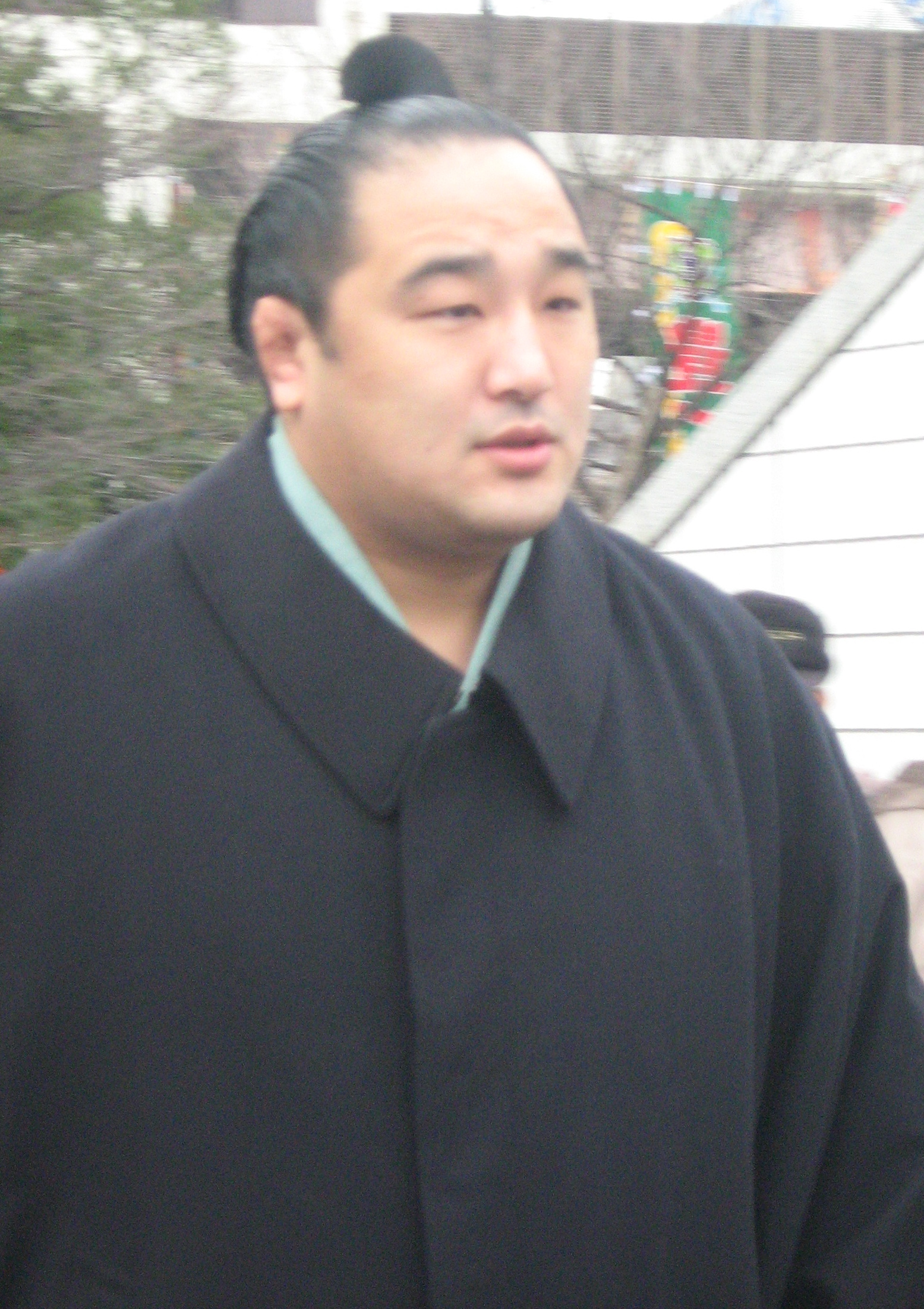

Personal information
- Born: Ryūji Suginomori; October 3, 1978 (age 48) Aomori, Japan
- Height: 1.84 m (6 ft 1/2 in)
- Weight: 143 kg (315 lb; 22 st 7 lb)
- Website: http://www.aminishiki.jp

Sport
- Sport: Sumo
- Retired: July, 2019
- Heya: Isegahama
- Record: 907-908-54
- Debut: January, 1997
- Highest rank: Sekiwake (September, 2007)
- Elder name: Ajigawa
- Special Prizes: Outstanding Performance (4); Fighting Spirit (2); Technique (6)
- Gold Stars: 8 Asashōryū (4); Musashimaru; Takanohana; Hakuhō; Kakuryū
- Updated on December 1, 2022

Aminishiki Ryūji (born October 3, 1978, as Ryūji Suginomori) is a retired Japanese sumo wrestler and the oyakata of the Ajigawa stable. He made his professional debut in 1997 and reached the top makuuchi division in 2000. He earned twelve special prizes and won eight kinboshi or gold stars for defeating yokozuna. He was twice runner-up in a tournament. The highest rank he reached was sekiwake. After more than 22 years as an active wrestler he retired in July 2019 at the age of 40. He is in the all-time top ten for a number of sumo records, including most career wins, most top division appearances and most tournaments ranked in the top division. He wrestled for Isegahama stable.

== Early life and sumo background ==
Aminishiki was born in Fukaura, Nishitsugaru District, Aomori Prefecture. He had an extensive sumo pedigree and background. His grandfather was a wrestler for Dewanoumi stable in the past, and his older brother was Asōfuji who would proceed him joining Ajigawa stable (later renamed Isegahama). Both joined this stable because their father, an innkeeper and fisherman was the cousin of the stable's owner, the former Asahifuji. In his younger years, he was also inspired by the wrestler Kaihō who was five years his senior and went to the same primary, junior and senior high school as he did. He excelled at sumo in ability and determination from very early on, and by the time he joined his stable he was already known as a wrestler with possibly greater potential than his older brother. Due to his naturally thin physique he found it difficult to put on weight at first and had to be monitored closely by his stablemaster to make sure he was eating enough.

== Career ==
He made his professional debut in January 1997. He reached the second highest jūryō division after three years in January 2000. He made the top makuuchi division just three tournaments later in July 2000. He won his first special prize in his debut top division tournament, for Fighting Spirit. In January 2003, he scored his first win over a yokozuna by defeating Takanohana, who announced his retirement the next day. He was a runner-up in the May 2003 tournament. In 2004, he briefly fell to jūryō after suffering an injury in the July tournament.

Aminishiki has won the prestigious ginō-shō or Technique Prize on six occasions, and has also earned eight kinboshi or gold stars for defeating yokozuna. Having come close on a number of occasions, Aminishiki finally made his san'yaku debut in November 2006, having chalked up an impressive 11–4 runner-up record at maegashira 3 rank the previous September. He fell short with 6 wins at komusubi, but remained in the upper maegashira ranks. In July 2007, he returned to komusubi and scored 8–7, winning his second successive shukun-shō, or Outstanding Performance Award. This earned him promotion to sekiwake for September 2007. It took him 43 top division tournaments to reach sumo's third highest rank, the fourth slowest rise ever.

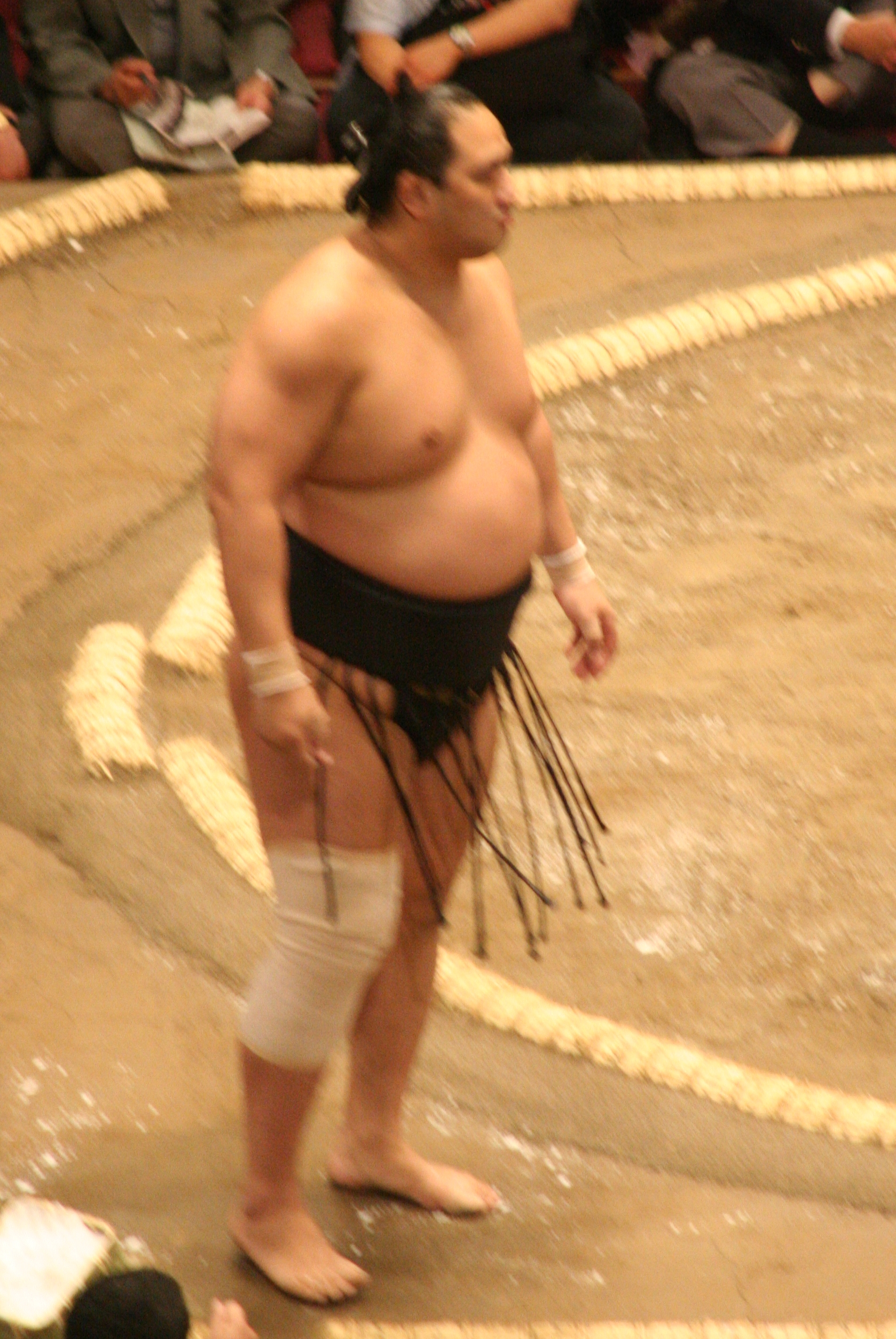
Aminishiki in May 2009, with his injured right knee taped

He won his first eight bouts in his sekiwake debut, leading the race for the championship, although he faltered in the second week and finished with a 10–5 record. In the November 2007 tournament he won his last three bouts to preserve his sekiwake rank with an 8–7 score. In January 2008, however, he could win only five matches and fell back to the maegashira ranks. In March 2008 he defeated yokozuna Hakuhō having injured his right knee the day before the match in a loss to Asashōryū. In May 2008 he scored an impressive ten wins and was the only man to defeat Kotoōshū, the winner of the tournament, which secured him his third Outstanding Performance Prize.

Aminishiki returned to the sekiwake rank in January 2009 after winning his fourth Outstanding Performance Prize at komusubi in November 2008. However, he was still wearing a brace on his right knee when he faced yokozuna Asashōryū on Day Eight. Asashōryū shoved him out of the ring, at which point Aminishiki winced, collapsed and grasped his right knee. He forfeited the next day's bout against Kyokutenhō, and pulled out of the tournament altogether after doctors pronounced he would require at least two weeks to heal.

Falling back to the maegashira ranks for the March tournament, he produced a 9–6 score on his return. He earned his seventh kinboshi, and fourth from Asashōryū, during the May 2009 tournament. In July 2009 he scored eleven wins and won his fourth Technique Prize, guaranteeing him a return to san'yaku. In September he was ranked at komusubi but just failed to secure his kachi-koshi, falling to Kakuryū on the final day to finish 7–8. A strong performance in the January 2010 tournament saw him win eleven bouts and pick up his fifth Technique Prize. He returned to the komusubi ranking in March, and to sekiwake in May. Dropping to the maegashira ranks for July, he was forced to withdraw after injuring his right knee yet again in a win over Tochinoshin on Day 12. His withdrawal drew much attention in Japan because it meant on that day foreigners outnumbered native born Japanese in the top division for the first time ever (17 to 16). He remained an upper maegashira, and held on to the maegashira 3 rank in July 2011, despite only scoring 7–8 in the previous tournament, due to the larger number of forced retirements from the top two division in the wake of a match-fixing scandal – his brother amongst them.

In March 2012 he returned to the rank of sekiwake for the first time in ten tournaments, and although he fell just short of kachi-koshi with a 7–8 record, he remained in the san'yaku ranks at komusubi in May. On Day 1 he defeated Hakuhō for the fourth time, handing the yokozuna his first opening day defeat since November 2008 – and Aminishiki was the wrestler who beat him on that occasion as well. Aminishiki also beat ōzeki Baruto, Kotoōshū and Kakuryū in the opening five days, but was defeated on the final day to fall to a 7–8 record and missed out on his fifth Outstanding Performance Prize. He returned to komusubi in July 2014 and won his sixth Technique Prize in September, which was his eleventh special prize overall, and first since 2010. Following the retirement of Kyokutenhō in July 2015, Aminishiki had the most appearances in the top division of anyone on the banzuke, and he finished his career fourth on the all-time list.

He defeated yokozuna Kakuryū on the third day of the January 2016 tournament, his eighth (and final) kinboshi and first since 2009. At 37 years and 3 months he was the fifth oldest wrestler to earn a kinboshi. He defeated every yokozuna he faced at least once. In May 2016 he competed in his 93rd top division tournament, equal fourth on the all-time list, but he tore his left Achilles tendon on the second day and had to withdraw. He missed the Nagoya tournament in July, which meant he dropped to the jūryō division in September for the first time since 2004. He continued to compete despite falling to jūryō, with 8–7 records in the September and November 2016 tournaments. In May 2017 he had the chance to win his first yūshō or championship in any division at the age of 38 but he was defeated on the last day by Nishikigi. In the September 2017 tournament he was one of four wrestlers to finish with a 10–5 record and took part in a playoff for the championship, but was eliminated at the semi-final stage. Nevertheless, he was promoted to the top division for the November 2017 tournament, becoming at 39 years of age the oldest man to return to makuuchi since the Japan Sumo Association began keeping records in the 1920s. In this tournament he secured his majority of wins against losses on the final day with a victory over Chiyoshōma and was awarded the Fighting Spirit prize, his first sanshō since 2014 and his first Fighting Spirit Award since his debut top division tournament over 17 years previously. He missed three days of the January 2018 tournament with a knee injury, but returned from Day 10. After falling back to jūryō in March he returned to the top division again in May, extending his own record for the oldest wrestler to be promoted to makuuchi.

== Retirement from sumo ==
On 16 July 2019 Aminishiki announced his retirement at the age of 40 following a knee injury he suffered on the second day of the Nagoya tournament against jūryō newcomer Ryuko, which forced him to withdraw on the third day on and would have seen him demoted to the third makushita division. He is staying in sumo as a toshiyori or elder of the Japan Sumo Association under the name Ajigawa. He was the last wrestler born in the 1970s active in sumo's top three professional divisions. His 907 career wins rank him eighth on the all-time list, and only two wrestlers (Ōshio and Kyokutenhō) have fought more than his 1805 career bouts. His 117 tournaments ranked as a sekitori (makuuchi or jūryō) is the most in history (a record he shares with Kaiō).

Due to the COVID-19 pandemic Aminishiki's danpatsu-shiki or official retirement ceremony was repeatedly postponed, eventually taking place on 29 May 2022. In addition to his role as an elder, he has enrolled in Waseda University's graduate school to do a masters course in sports science research.

On 1 December 2022 Aminishiki formed his own stable after receiving permission from the Japan Sumo Association to become independent from Isegahama stable. He took his 17-year-old nephew Sakuraba with him to his new stable, which will be located in Tokyo's Kōtō ward. Less than a year after opening his stable, Aminishiki recruited Ukrainian sumo star Aonishiki, who became his stable's first sekitori, raising him in the makuuchi division for the 2025 March tournament. Aonishiki went on to win his first top division title in November 2025, thereby securing promotion to the rank of ōzeki.

== Fighting style ==
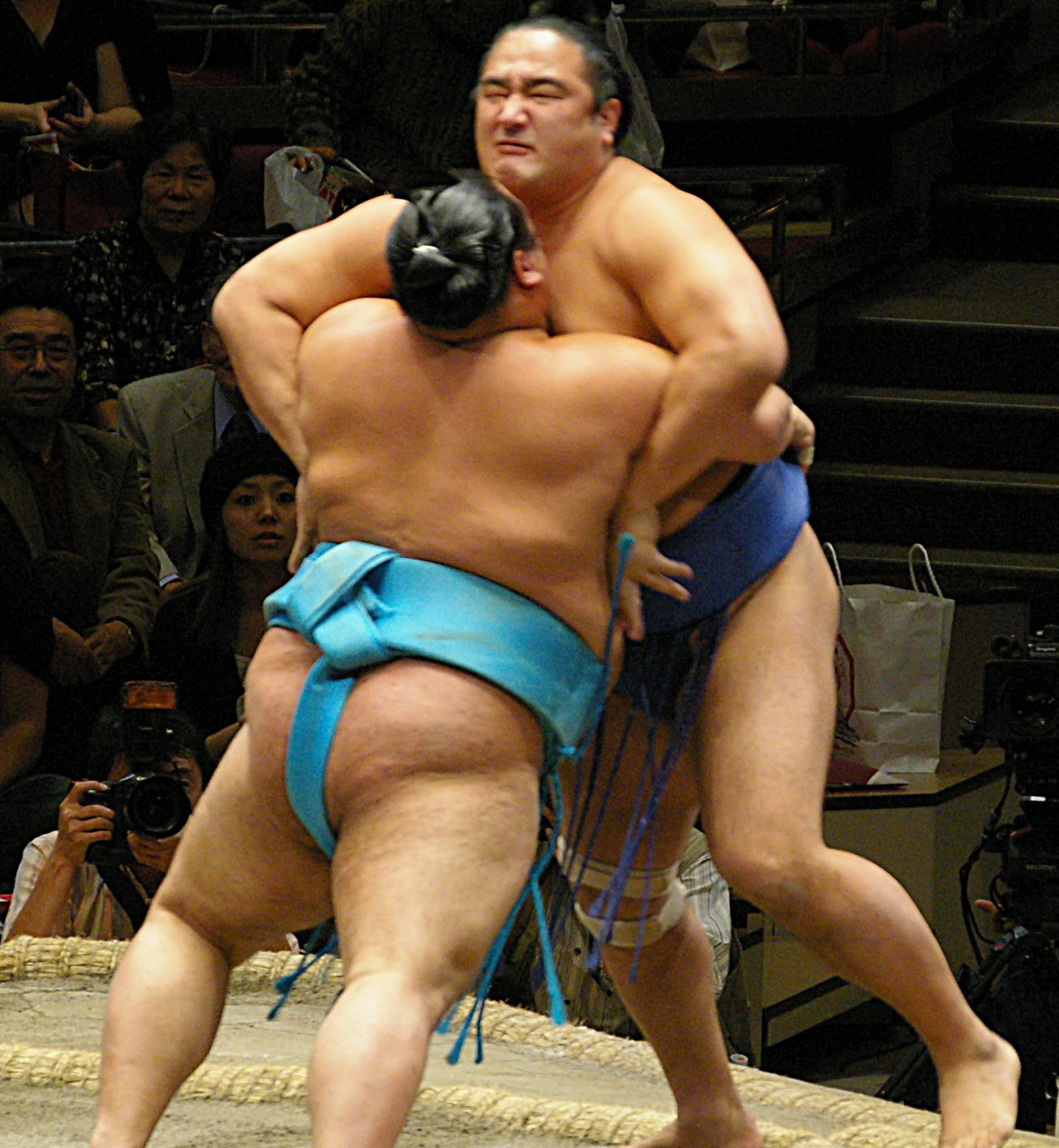
A bout between Aminishiki and Toyonoshima

Aminishiki preferred to work on the mawashi rather than push his opponents, and specialized in throwing and tripping techniques. He was one of the few wrestlers in his time to employ soto-gake, or outer leg trip, winning with it 18 times in his career. His most common throw, and third most used move overall, was uwate-nage, or outer arm throw. In September 2018 he defeated maegashira Kotoyuki with the rare tokkurinage, a kind of neck throw (named after the flasks used to serve sake) that had not been seen in the top division since its addition to the list of official techniques in 2001. However, his two most common winning techniques were the straightforward yori-kiri or force out, and oshi-dashi, or push out.

His favoured grip on the mawashi at the beginning of his career was the unusual mae-mawashi, a double-handed grip on the front of the belt at the opponent's stomach area. However, he moved to favouring a migi-yotsu grip, with his left hand outside and right hand inside his opponent's arms.

Aminishiki was also known for employing henka, or sidestepping, to wrongfoot his opponents at the tachi-ai or initial charge. His victory over Hakuhō in March 2008 was achieved in this manner. In his later years on the dohyō he was restricted by a series of knee injuries and was one of the first wrestlers to wear a carbon fibre knee brace.

== Family ==
Aminishiki's older brother Asōfuji was also a sumo wrestler. He made his debut three years before Aminishiki in 1994 but he spent only two tournaments in the top division, retiring in 2011 after having been found guilty of match-fixing. Their stablemaster, former yokozuna Asahifuji, comes from the same area of Japan and is a cousin of their father.

Aminishiki is married with three children. His youngest child, and first son, was born in July 2017.

Aminishiki's nephew, Ryo Sakuraba, joined Isegahama stable in 2022, making his debut at the Kyūshū tournament.

== Career record ==
Aminishiki Ryūji
| Year | January Hatsu basho, Tokyo | March Haru basho, Osaka | May Natsu basho, Tokyo | July Nagoya basho, Nagoya | September Aki basho, Tokyo | November Kyūshū basho, Fukuoka |
|---|---|---|---|---|---|---|
| 1997 | (Maezumo) | West Jonokuchi #42; 7–0–P | East Jonidan #46; 6–1 | East Sandanme #84; 6–1 | East Sandanme #31; 5–2 | West Sandanme #3; 5–2 |
| 1998 | West Makushita #40; 4–3 | East Makushita #29; 6–1 | East Makushita #12; 4–3 | West Makushita #9; 2–5 | East Makushita #24; 3–4 | East Makushita #32; 5–2 |
| 1999 | West Makushita #17; 5–2 | East Makushita #11; 4–3 | West Makushita #8; 4–3 | East Makushita #5; 4–3 | West Makushita #2; 4–3 | West Makushita #1; 4–3 |
| 2000 | West Jūryō #13; 8–7 | East Jūryō #8; 9–6 | West Jūryō #2; 8–7 | West Maegashira #13; 10–5; F | West Maegashira #9; 7–8 | West Maegashira #10; 1–14 |
| 2001 | East Jūryō #6; 9–6 | East Maegashira #15; 8–7 | West Maegashira #10; 7–8 | West Maegashira #12; 7–8 | West Maegashira #13; 7–8 | West Maegashira #14; 8–7 |
| 2002 | East Maegashira #10; 9–6 | East Maegashira #6; 10–5; T | East Maegashira #1; 5–10 | East Maegashira #5; 6–9 | West Maegashira #7; 7–8 | West Maegashira #8; 9–6 |
| 2003 | East Maegashira #4; 4–11 ★ | East Maegashira #9; 8–7 | West Maegashira #7; 11–4; T | West Maegashira #1; 2–12–1 ★ | West Maegashira #9; 10–5 | East Maegashira #3; 5–10 |
| 2004 | East Maegashira #8; 9–6 | East Maegashira #4; 3–12 | East Maegashira #11; 8–7 | East Maegashira #9; 4–8–3 | East Maegashira #16; 6–9 | East Jūryō #2; 9–6 |
| 2005 | West Maegashira #16; 7–8 | West Maegashira #17; 9–6 | East Maegashira #11; 8–7 | West Maegashira #9; 9–6 | West Maegashira #5; 7–8 ★ | East Maegashira #6; 7–8 |
| 2006 | East Maegashira #7; 9–6 | East Maegashira #3; 7–8 | West Maegashira #3; 5–10 | West Maegashira #7; 8–7 | West Maegashira #3; 11–4; T | East Komusubi #2; 6–9 |
| 2007 | West Maegashira #2; 4–11 | East Maegashira #9; 9–6 | East Maegashira #4; 9–6; O★ | West Komusubi #1; 8–7; O | East Sekiwake #1; 10–5 | East Sekiwake #1; 8–7 |
| 2008 | East Sekiwake #1; 5–10 | East Maegashira #2; 6–9 ★ | West Maegashira #4; 10–5; O | East Maegashira #1; 6–9 | East Maegashira #4; 8–7 ★ | West Komusubi #1; 8–7; O |
| 2009 | West Sekiwake #1; 3–6–6 | West Maegashira #5; 9–6 | West Maegashira #1; 5–10 ★ | East Maegashira #5; 11–4; T | West Komusubi #1; 7–8 | West Maegashira #1; 5–10 |
| 2010 | West Maegashira #6; 11–4; T | West Komusubi #1; 8–7 | West Sekiwake #1; 5–10 | West Maegashira #2; 6–7–2 | West Maegashira #4; 8–7 | East Maegashira #2; 8–7 |
| 2011 | West Maegashira #1; 6–9 | West Maegashira #3; Tournament Cancelled; Match fixing investigation 0–0–0 | West Maegashira #3; 7–8 | West Maegashira #3; 2–13 | East Maegashira #12; 10–5 | East Maegashira #6; 9–6 |
| 2012 | West Maegashira #1; 9–6 | West Sekiwake #1; 7–8 | West Komusubi #1; 7–8 | West Maegashira #1; 6–9 | East Maegashira #4; 10–5 | East Komusubi #1; 7–8 |
| 2013 | East Maegashira #1; 9–6 | West Komusubi #1; 7–8 | West Maegashira #1; 6–9 | West Maegashira #3; 6–9 | West Maegashira #5; 9–6 | West Maegashira #1; 6–9 |
| 2014 | East Maegashira #4; 6–9 | East Maegashira #6; 8–7 | East Maegashira #3; 10–5 | East Komusubi #1; 3–12 | East Maegashira #6; 10–5; T | West Maegashira #1; 6–9 |
| 2015 | West Maegashira #3; 6–9 | East Maegashira #6; 8–3–4 | West Maegashira #2; 6–9 | East Maegashira #4; 6–9 | East Maegashira #6; 8–7 | West Maegashira #3; 8–7 |
| 2016 | East Maegashira #1; 6–8–1 ★ | West Maegashira #3; 7–8 | West Maegashira #3; 1–2–12 | West Maegashira #13; Sat out due to injury 0–0–15 | West Jūryō #10; 8–7 | East Jūryō #8; 8–7 |
| 2017 | West Jūryō #7; 5–10 | West Jūryō #12; 9–6 | West Jūryō #8; 9–6 | West Jūryō #4; 10–5 | East Jūryō #2; 10–5–P | West Maegashira #13; 8–7; F |
| 2018 | West Maegashira #10; 3–9–3 | East Jūryō #2; 8–7 | West Maegashira #16; 4–11 | West Jūryō #4; 9–6 | West Jūryō #1; 7–8 | West Jūryō #2; 7–8 |
| 2019 | East Jūryō #3; 3–12 | West Jūryō #11; 8–7 | West Jūryō #10; 7–8 | West Jūryō #11; Retired; 0–3–8 | x | x |
Record given as wins–losses–absences Top division champion Top division runner-up Retired Lower divisions Non-participation Sanshō key: F=Fighting spirit; O=Outstanding performance; T=Technique Also shown: ★=Kinboshi; P=Playoff(s); Divisions: Makuuchi — Jūryō — Makushita — Sandanme — Jonidan — Jonokuchi Makuuchi ranks: Yokozuna — Ōzeki — Sekiwake — Komusubi — Maegashira

== See also ==
- List of sumo elders
- List of sumo record holders
- List of sumo tournament top division runners-up
- Glossary of sumo terms
- List of past sumo wrestlers
- List of sekiwake
