= Yoshinofuji Naoya =

Japanese sumo wrestler (born 2001)

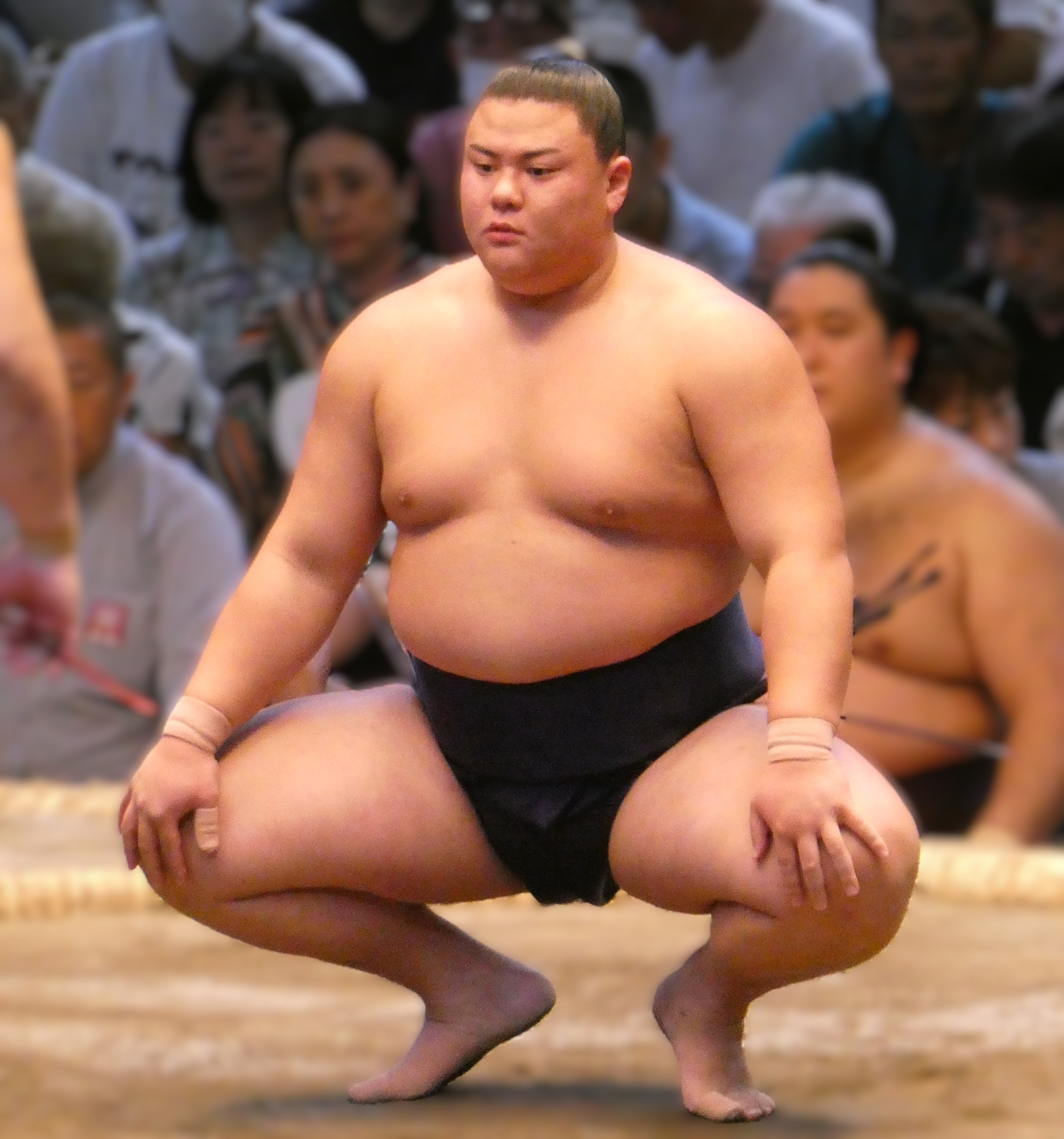
- Yoshinofuji in July 2025

Personal information
- Native name: 義ノ富士 直哉
- Born: Kusano Naoya; June 25, 2001 (age 25) Uto, Kumamoto, Japan
- Height: 1.85 m (6 ft 1 in)
- Weight: 157 kg (346 lb; 24.7 st)

Sport
- Sport: Sumo
- Rank: see below
- University team: Nihon University
- Heya: Isegahama
- Debut: May 2024
- Highest rank: Komusubi (July 2026)
- Championships: 2 (Jūryō)
- Special Prizes: Fighting Spirit (2); Outstanding Performance (1); Technique (2)
- Gold Stars: 3 Ōnosato (2); Hōshōryū
- Updated on June 29, 2026

Yoshinofuji Naoya (Japanese: 義ノ富士 直哉; born as Kusano Naoya, 草野 直哉 (June 25, 2001)) is a Japanese professional sumo wrestler from Uto, Kumamoto. He made his debut in May 2024 and currently wrestles for Isegahama stable. He reached the jūryō division in March 2025. His highest rank has been komusubi. He was a runner-up in his top makuuchi division debut in July 2025, where he was considered a top contender for most of its duration, also winning the Fighting Spirit and Technique awards. He changed his ring name from Kusano to Yoshinofuji prior to the November 2025 tournament.

== Early life ==
Kusano began practicing sumo at the age of five at a local club in his hometown of Uto, Kumamoto. During his third year at Uto City Kakujo Junior High School, Kusano won the All Japan Junior High School Sumo Championship to earn the title of Junior High School Yokozuna. He then attended Buntoku Gakuen High School where he finished runner-up in the All-Japan High School Selection Tournament during his second year. In his third year, Kusano achieved second place at the Inter-High School Championships and won the team competition at the Junior World Sumo Championships.

After high school, Kusano enrolled at Nihon University which is known for their strong sumo club. During his first year at Nihon, Kusano was the runner-up at the open weight category of the National Student Weight Class Championships, but he went on to win the same tournament In his second year. In addition, he also placed third at the National Student Sumo Championship during his second year. In his third year, Kusano secured victories in both the East Japan Student Sumo Championships and the open weight division at the National Student Weight Class Championships for the second time. In his fourth year, he won the National Student Sumo Championship which earned him the title of Student Yokozuna.

Due to his amateur sumo accomplishments, Kusano was granted makushita tsukedashi status which allowed him to make his debut at the bottom of the makushita division instead of the lowest jonokuchi division. As a result, Kusano decided to turn professional and was scheduled to join Miyagino stable as his childhood friend Kawazoe was a member of the stable. However, following the abuse case and the retirement of then-Miyagino's top ranker, Hokuseihō, Miyagino stable was suspended for an indefinite period with all personnel transferring to Isegahama stable. Due to this situation, Kusano joined Isegahama stable.

== Career ==
Kusano made his professional debut in May 2024 at the bottom of the makushita division. He achieved six consecutive victories, including wins over former maegashira Amakaze and giving Aonishiki just his second professional loss. Kusano was aiming for the makushita Yūshō in his first professional tournament, but lost to former jūryō wrestler Fujiseiun in his final bout. Nevertheless, he finished with a strong 6–1 record. On the 14th day of the July 2024 tournament, Kusano was hit with a powerful slap (a completely legal move) in his match against Nishinoryū which caused him to lose consciousness and collapse. After five minutes and not having moved a muscle, Kusano was stretchered off the dohyō with Miyagino (the 69th Yokozuna Hakuhō) aiding him from the side. Kusano was rushed to a hospital in Nagoya by ambulance and reportedly complained of pain in his head and neck, symptoms of a concussion. Nevertheless, on the final day of the tournament, Kusano was seen in good spirits in the preparation room. Nevertheless, Kusano continued to post winning records and was promoted to the rank of makushita 3 for the January 2025 tournament. In this tournament, he defeated jūryō-ranked Kiryūkō and finished with a 4–3 record, securing a promotion to jūryō for the March 2025 tournament. This achievement marked his rise to the jūryō division in less than a year since his professional debut. He won his first eight bouts in his first jūryō tournament in March 2025, extending his career-long streak of winning records, and went on to win the title with a 14–1 record, earning promotion to jūryō 1 for the May tournament.

Kusano again took home the jūryō championship in May 2025 with a final record of 13 wins. With the victory, Kusano became the fourth competitor since the Heisei era (since 1989) to win two consecutive tournaments after being promoted to jūryō for the first time, and was promoted to the top division for July.

At the July 2025 tournament, Kusano defeated many rank-and-file opponents. He entered the final day tied for second place with Ukrainian Aonishiki, and one win behind tournament leader Kotoshōhō, but lost the following day to Takayasu. He became the runner-up in a five-way tie with Aonishiki, Atamifuji, Ōnosato and Tamawashi, and also claimed the Fighting Spirit and Technique prizes.

In September Kusano won eight matches, extending his streak of winning records to nine tournaments. Upon the release of the November 2025 tournament rankings, Kusano changed his shikona, or ring name, to Yoshinofuji (義ノ富士). Stablemaster Isegahama (the 73rd yokozuna Terunofuji) commented on the name change, saying that the former Kusano insisted on using the kanji character yoshi (義), while Isegahama wanted to keep the stable tradition of using fuji (富士) in the ring name. Isegahama said that he wanted Yoshinofuji to live up to his new name, which embodies loyalty and compassion.

Yoshinofuji collected his first kinboshi by defeating yokozuna Ōnosato at the November 2025 tournament. At the following tournament in January 2026 he defeated both yokozuna, Hōshōryū and Ōnosato. It marked the first time that a wrestler collected gold stars on consecutive days since Myōgiryū accomplished the feat in January 2020.

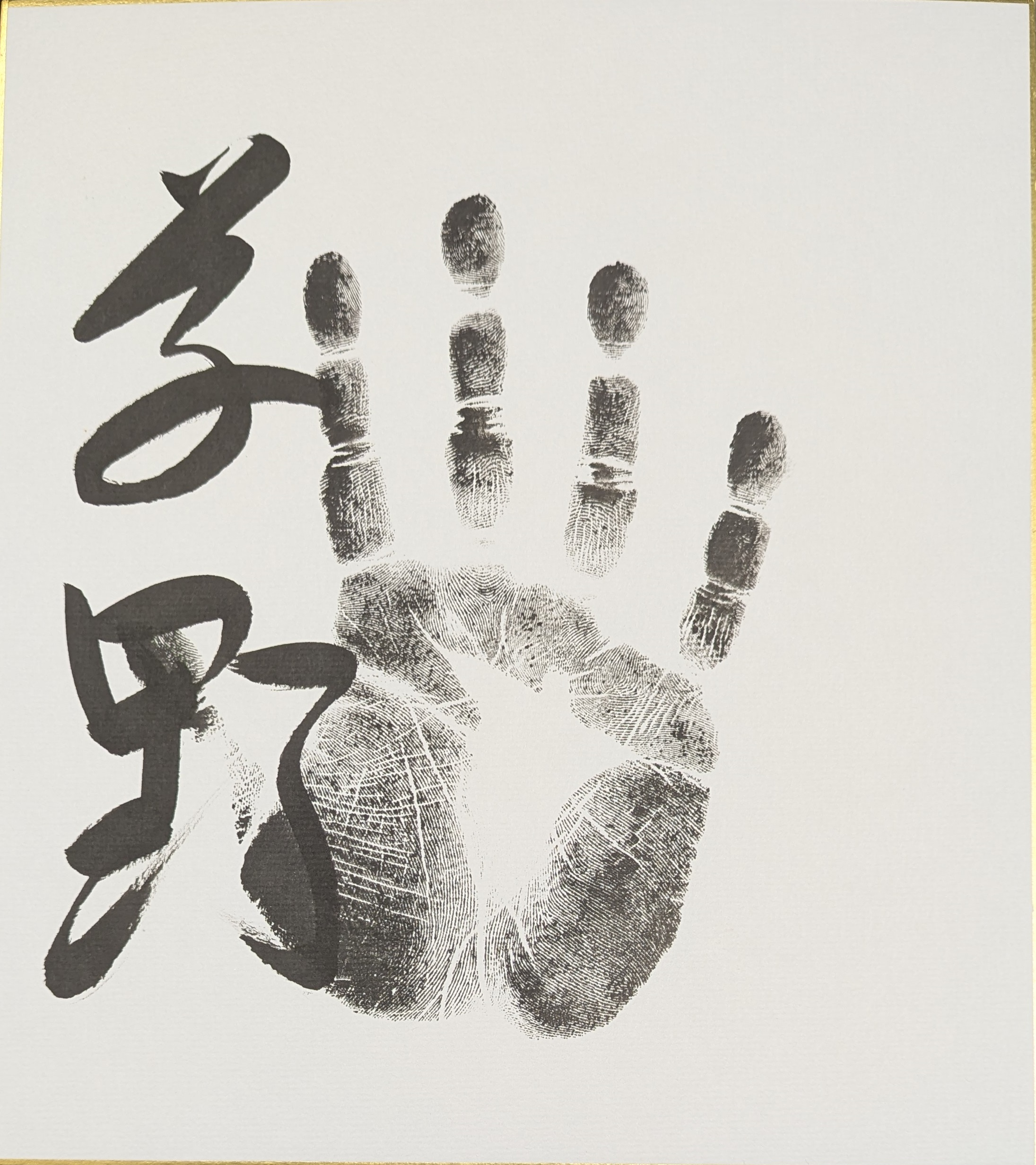
Yoshinofuji's original tegata (handprint & signature) using the Kusano shikona.

During the November 2026 tournament, Yoshinofuji performed well, winning most of his matches against higher-ranked opponents. In the second half of the tournament, however, he suffered a string of losses. Despite his performance, it was announced on the final day that he could receive the prize for Outstanding Performance if he managed to achieve a kachi-koshi record. Yoshinofuji was defeated by Gōnoyama and did not receive the award.

== Personal life ==
Yoshinofuji's hobby is visiting the sauna, his favorite food is sushi, his favorite musician is Shōgo Hamada, and his favorite manga is Detective Conan. Yoshinofuji is childhood friends with stablemate Kawazoe as they attended elementary school, junior high school, high school, and university together.

In July 2026, Yoshinofuji's hometown was struck by the 2026 Kumamoto earthquake. Yoshinofuji, who was in the region visiting Uki, experienced the disaster firsthand. During the Japan Sumo Association's summer tour in Gifu he spoke to the press, after participating in the initial rescue efforts, about the partial destruction of his father's yakiniku restaurant and the family home.

== Fighting style ==
Yoshinofuji is a yotsu-sumo wrestler who prefers grappling to pushing and thrusting techniques. He favors a migi-yotsu (left hand outside, right hand inside) position when gripping his opponent's mawashi. He won most of his bouts with a straightforward yorikiri (frontal force out). His second most common kimarite in oshidashi (frontal push out).

During the January 2026 tournament in which Yoshinofuji beat both yokozuna competitors, chief judge Kokonoe (former ōzeki Chiyotaikai) noted that Yoshinofuji was a strong sumo wrestler, with a strong lower back, pulling power and muscle strength.

== Career Record ==
Yoshinofuji Naoya
Year	January Hatsu basho, Tokyo	March Haru basho, Osaka	May Natsu basho, Tokyo	July Nagoya basho, Nagoya	September Aki basho, Tokyo	November Kyūshū basho, Fukuoka
2024	x	x	Makushita tsukedashi #60; 6–1	West Makushita #29; 5–2	West Makushita #17; 5–2	East Makushita #7; 4–3
2025	West Makushita #3; 4–3	West Jūryō #14; 14–1; Champion	West Jūryō #1; 13–2; Champion	East Maegashira #14; 11–4; FT	West Maegashira #6; 8–7	East Maegashira #5; 9–6; T★
2026	West Maegashira #1; 8–7; O★★	West Maegashira #1; 7–8	East Maegashira #2; 11–4; F	East Komusubi #1; 6–9	West Maegashira #2; 9–6	West Komusubi #1; 7–8
Record given as wins–losses–absences Top division champion Top division runner-up Retired Non-participation Jūryō Lower divisions Sanshō key: F=Fighting spirit; O=Outstanding performance; T=Technique Also shown: ★=Kinboshi; P=Playoff(s); Divisions: Makuuchi — Jūryō — Makushita — Sandanme — Jonidan — Jonokuchi Makuuchi ranks: Yokozuna — Ōzeki — Sekiwake — Komusubi — Maegashira

== See also ==
- Glossary of sumo terms
- List of active sumo wrestlers
- List of active gold star earners
- List of active special prize winners
- List of sumo record holders
- List of sumo top division runners-up
- List of sumo second division champions
- List of komusubi
