= Ajigawa stable (active) =

Stable of sumo wrestlers

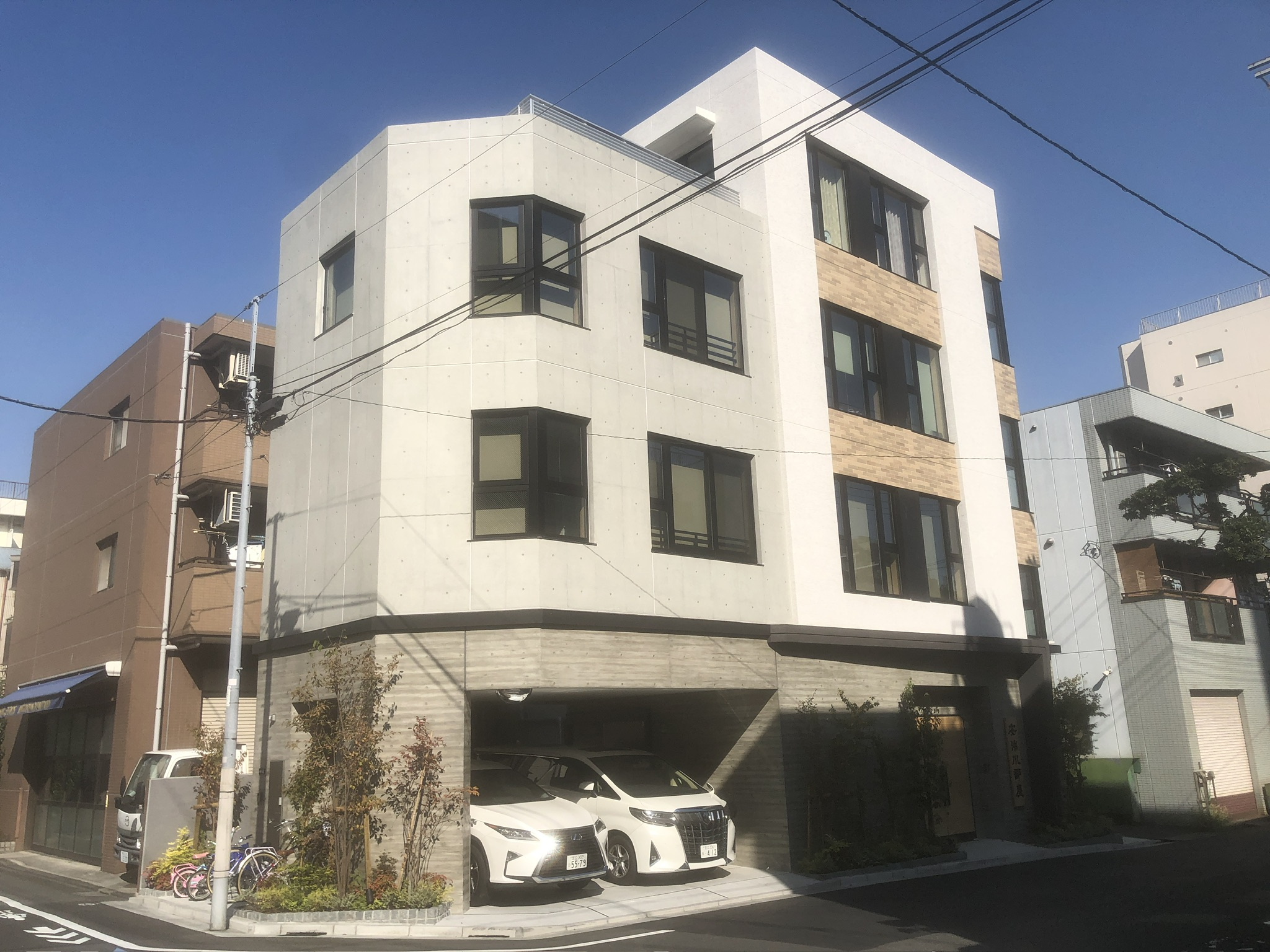

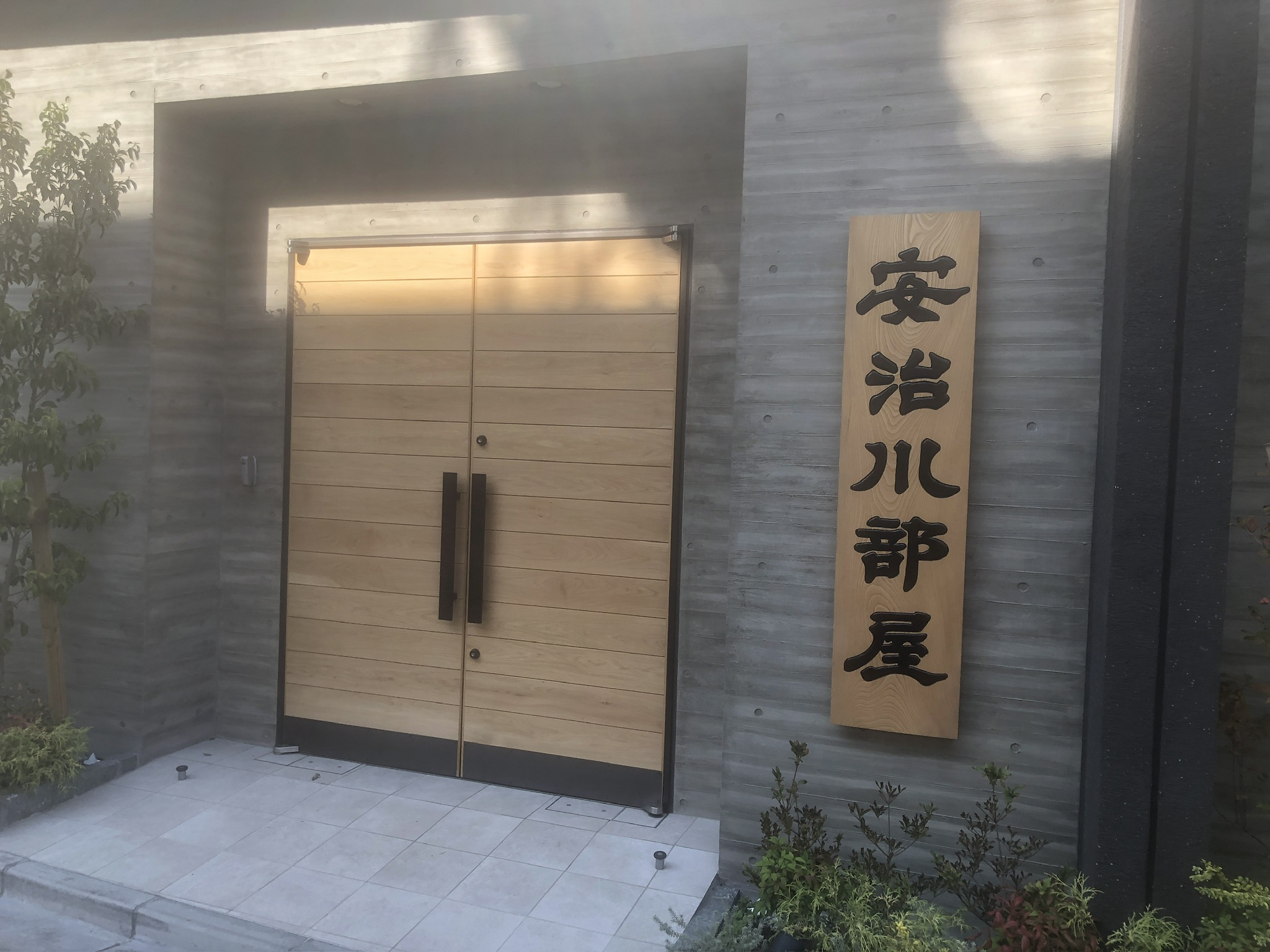

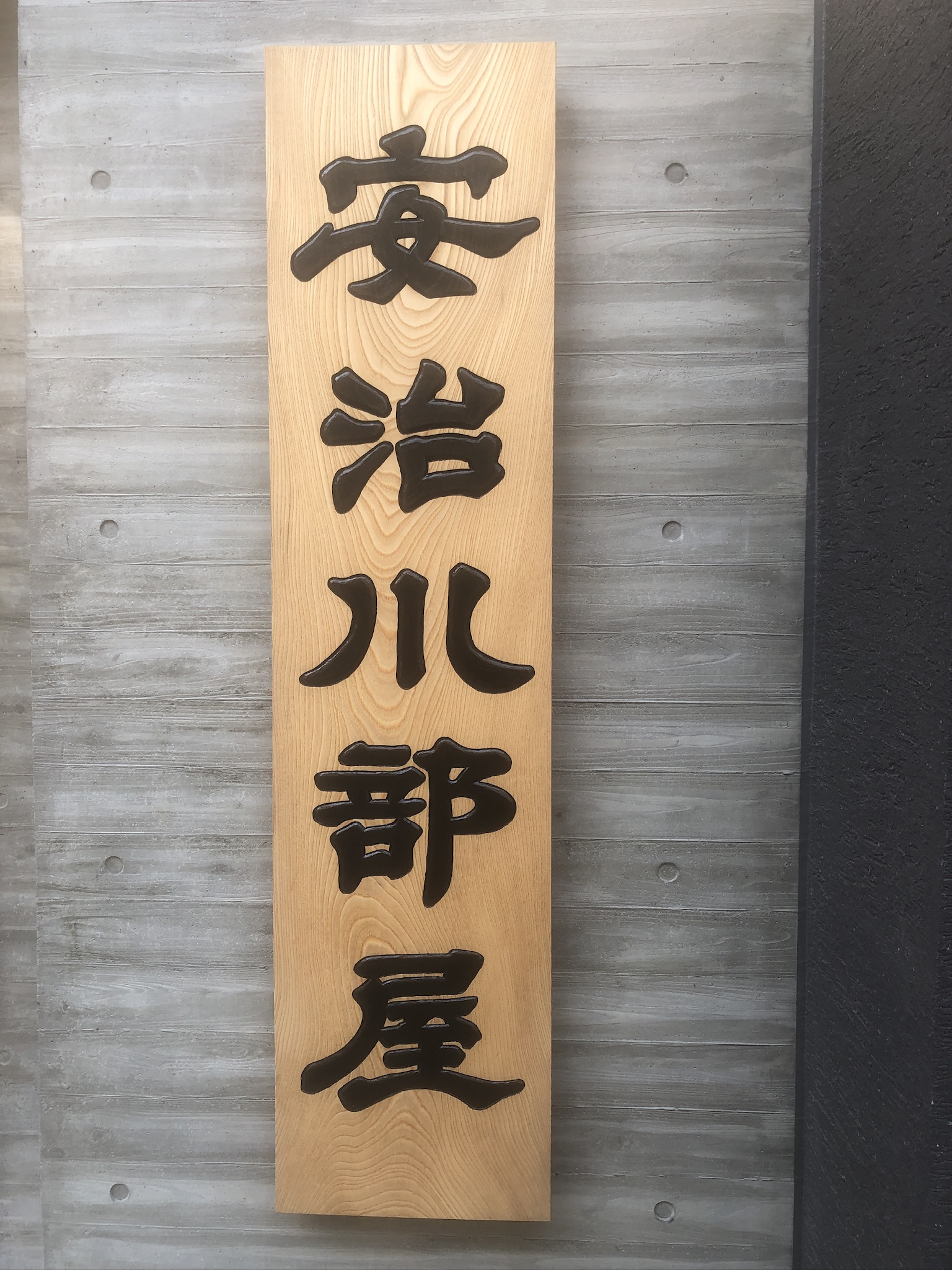

Ajigawa stable (安治川部屋, Ajigawa-beya) is a stable of sumo wrestlers, formed in 2022, part of the Isegahama ichimon, or group of stables. It was formed by former sekiwake Aminishiki in December 2022 after he became independent from Isegahama stable. The stable's independence was formalized by an opening event for new stable supporters which was organized later that same month.

At first, the stable was temporarily hosted in the Senda District pending construction of a new building in the Kōtō ward of Tokyo. The new building was inaugurated on 16 June 2023 in the presence of tate-gyōji Shikimori Inosuke and masters Isegahama and Asakayama. It was also announced that a presentation ceremony for local residents would be held on 18 June.

As of May 2026, the stable has 9 active wrestlers.

== History ==
On June 3, 2023, the stable officially recruited Danylo Yavhusishyn, a 19-year-old Ukrainian refugee and freestyle wrestler from Vinnytsia, Ukraine; upon entering professional sumo, Yavhusishyn was given the ring name (shikona) of Aonishiki. An amateur wrestler who had competed for Ukraine at the international level, he has a background in freestyle wrestling and judo and he won third place at the 2019 Sumo World Championships (under 100 kilos category). After Ikazuchi stable's Shishi, he is the second Ukrainian to decide to compete professionally in sumo.

In July 2023, the stable won its first championship with Anōsho's victory in the jonokuchi division.

In March 2025, Aonishiki became the stable's first wrestler to be promoted to the top makuuchi division since the stable's founding, and in September 2025 he became the stable's first san'yaku when he was promoted to komusubi. For the November 2025 tournament he was promoted to sekiwake, earning the fastest promotion to sumo's third-highest rank. Aonishiki won the November 2025 top division championship in a tournament that included two defeats over yokozuna Hōshōryū on consecutive days, including the playoff. As a result of his accomplishments, which included at least 11 wins in his first five tournaments in the top division and six special prizes, Aonishiki was promoted to ōzeki for the January 2026 tournament.

== Owners ==
- 2022–present: 8th Ajigawa (iin, sekiwake Aminishiki, born 1978)

== Notable active wrestlers ==
- Aonishiki (best rank ōzeki, born 2004)

== Location ==
4-1 Ishijima, Kōtō-ku, Tokyo
15-minute walk from Kiyosumi-shirakawa Station (Tokyo Metro Hanzōmon Line, Toei Ōedo Line)

== See also ==
- List of sumo stables
- List of active sumo wrestlers
- List of past sumo wrestlers
- Glossary of sumo terms
