= Tochitsukasa Tetsuo =

Japanese sumo wrestler

Personal information
- Native name: 栃司 哲史
- Born: Tetsuo Goto; 25 April 1958 (age 68) Nagoya, Japan
- Height: 1.80 m (5 ft 11 in)
- Weight: 157 kg (346 lb)

Sport
- Sport: Sumo
- Retired: May, 1992
- Heya: Kasugano
- Record: 465–448–27
- Debut: March, 1981
- Highest rank: Sekiwake (January, 1988)
- Elder name: Irumagawa
- Championships: 2 (Jūryō)
- Special Prizes: Fighting Spirit (1); Technique (1)
- Gold Stars: 3 Takanosato; Chiyonofuji; Hokutoumi
- Updated on Mar 2010

Tochitsukasa Tetsuo (born 25 April 1958 as Tetsuo Goto) is a former sumo wrestler from Nakagawa, Nagoya, Aichi Prefecture, Japan. His highest rank was sekiwake. After his retirement from sumo in 1992 he became an elder of the Japan Sumo Association and established Irumagawa stable in 1993, which he ran until 2023.

== Career ==
A former amateur champion at Nihon University, he turned professional at the age of 23, joining Kasugano stable in March 1981. He reached the top makuuchi division in September 1983, and in 1984 he earned his first special prize for Fighting Spirit, and defeated Takanosato in his first ever bout against a yokozuna to earn his first of his three kinboshi. He spent most of 1985 in the second jūryō division, but in 1986 made the san'yaku ranks at komusubi. In November 1987 he scored 10–5 from the maegashira 6 ranking, defeating two ōzeki and winning the Technique Prize. This earned him promotion to his highest rank of sekiwake for the following tournament in January 1988. However, by the end of the year he was in jūryō again due to injury problems. He won the jūryō yūshō on two occasions in 1989 and won promotion back to the top division. After missing the September 1990 tournament he fell to jūryō again and made only one more appearance in makuuchi before retiring in May 1992 at the age of 34.

== Retirement from sumo ==
He became an elder of the Japan Sumo Association under the name Irumagawa Oyakata, and established Irumagawa stable in 1993. His wrestlers Yotsukasa and Otsukasa both reached the top division in 1999, and they were followed by Masatsukasa in 2008 and Sagatsukasa in 2010. He is due to reach the retirement age for elders of 65 in April 2023, and in preparation for this he handed over control of his stable to former komusubi Kakizoe in February 2023, with the stable henceforth being known as Ikazuchi stable.

== Fighting style ==
A powerful and versatile wrestler, Tochitsukasa preferred tsuki/oshi or pushing and thrusting techniques rather than fighting on the mawashi. His favourite kimarite were oshi-dashi (push out) and tsuki otoshi (thrust over). However he also regularly won by yori-kiri (force out), and was also capable of pulling off throws, both overarm (uwatenage) and underarm (shitatenage).

== Trivia ==
He had a quirk of always staying in a squat position for much longer than normal and rocking back and forth before returning to his corner during the shikiri, or warm-up phase of a match.

== Career record ==
Tochitsukasa Tetsuo
Year	January Hatsu basho, Tokyo	March Haru basho, Osaka	May Natsu basho, Tokyo	July Nagoya basho, Nagoya	September Aki basho, Tokyo	November Kyūshū basho, Fukuoka
1981	x	Makushita tsukedashi #60; 6–1	East Makushita #30; 5–2	East Makushita #17; 4–3	West Makushita #13; 5–2	East Makushita #4; 4–3
1982	East Jūryō #13; 7–8	West Makushita #1; 3–4	West Makushita #5; 5–2	East Makushita #1; 3–4	East Makushita #7; 4–3	East Makushita #5; 5–2
1983	West Jūryō #12; 9–6	East Jūryō #9; 8–7	East Jūryō #5; 9–6	West Jūryō #1; 8–7	East Maegashira #13; 7–8	West Jūryō #2; 9–6
1984	East Maegashira #14; 9–6	West Maegashira #8; 7–8	East Maegashira #9; 10–5; F	West Maegashira #1; 3–12 ★	East Maegashira #13; 5–10	East Jūryō #5; 8–7
1985	West Jūryō #4; 8–7	East Jūryō #2; 8–7	East Jūryō #1; 10–5	West Maegashira #13; 6–9	West Jūryō #3; 8–7	East Jūryō #3; 10–5–P
1986	East Jūryō #1; 9–6	East Maegashira #12; 9–6	East Maegashira #5; 8–7	West Komusubi #1; 4–11	East Maegashira #3; 7–8 ★	East Maegashira #4; 8–7
1987	West Komusubi #1; 7–8	East Maegashira #1; 5–10	East Maegashira #6; 7–8	West Maegashira #6; 6–9	West Maegashira #11; 8–7	East Maegashira #6; 10–5; T
1988	West Sekiwake #1; 7–8	West Komusubi #1; 5–10	East Maegashira #4; 5–10	West Maegashira #8; 6–9	West Maegashira #13; 4–4–7	East Jūryō #5; 7–8
1989	West Jūryō #5; 11–4; Champion	East Jūryō #1; 8–7	East Maegashira #14; 6–6–3	East Jūryō #2; 12–3; Champion	East Maegashira #13; 9–6	West Maegashira #7; 8–7
1990	East Maegashira #2; 4–11 ★	East Maegashira #10; 7–8	West Maegashira #11; 8–7	East Maegashira #8; 9–6	West Maegashira #2; Sat out due to injury 0–0–15	East Jūryō #1; 7–8
1991	East Jūryō #3; 8–7	West Jūryō #1; 9–6	East Jūryō #1; 6–9	East Jūryō #5; 9–6	East Jūryō #1; 10–5	East Maegashira #11; 2–13
1992	West Jūryō #6; 8–7	West Jūryō #4; 5–10	East Jūryō #9; Retired; 4–9	x	x	x
Record given as wins–losses–absences Top division champion Top division runner-up Retired Lower divisions Non-participation Sanshō key: F=Fighting spirit; O=Outstanding performance; T=Technique Also shown: ★=Kinboshi; P=Playoff(s); Divisions: Makuuchi — Jūryō — Makushita — Sandanme — Jonidan — Jonokuchi Makuuchi ranks: Yokozuna — Ōzeki — Sekiwake — Komusubi — Maegashira

== See also ==
- Glossary of sumo terms
- List of sumo tournament second division champions
- List of past sumo wrestlers
- List of sumo elders
- List of sekiwake
