= Takamiyama Torinosuke =

Japanese sumo wrestler (1873–1924)

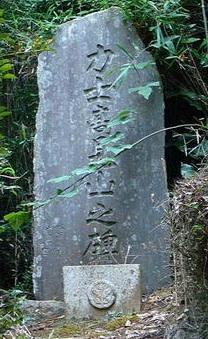
- The grave of Takimiyama in his birthplace of Chōshi City

Personal information
- Native name: 髙見山酉之助
- Born: Yoshioka Torinosuke; October 25, 1873 Choshi, Chiba Prefecture
- Died: January 11, 1924 (aged 50)
- Height: 1.73 m (5 ft 8 in)
- Weight: 139 kg (306 lb)

Sport
- Sport: Sumo
- Retired: May 1913
- Heya: Takasago
- Record: 43-29-55-13draws (makuuchi)
- Debut: June 1895
- Highest rank: Sekiwake (January 1910)
- Championships: 1 (Makuuchi)
- Updated on July 2008

Takamiyama Torinosuke (髙見山酉之助, October 25, 1873 – January 11, 1924) was a Japanese sumo wrestler.

== Career ==
He joined Takasago stable, reaching the top makuuchi division in 1907. In the June 1909 tournament, he defeated ozeki Tachiyama and won the first official championship in the history of professional sumo. He reached his highest rank of sekiwake in January 1910. He reportedly feared facing the small but fierce Tamatsubaki Kentaro. After he retired in May 1913, he left the sumo world and returned to his hometown.

== Top Division Record ==
Takamiyama Torinosuke
-	Spring	Summer
1907	West Maegashira #14; 5–3–1; 1d	West Maegashira #9; 5–3–1; 1d
1908	West Maegashira #5; 5–4–1	West Maegashira #3; 6–3–1
1909	Sat out	East Maegashira #7; 7–0; 3d
1910	East Sekiwake; 1–6–1; 2d	East Maegashira #5; 5–2–1; 2d
1911	East Komusubi; 3–3–3; 1d	Sat out
1912	Sat out	East Maegashira #12; 6–2; 2d
1913	East Maegashira #2; 0–3–6; 1d	West Maegashira #12; Retired; 0–0–10
Record given as win-loss-absent Top Division Champion Top Division Runner-up Retired Lower Divisions Key:d=Draw(s) (引分); h=Hold(s) (預り); Divisions: Makuuchi — Jūryō — Makushita — Sandanme — Jonidan — Jonokuchi Makuuchi ranks: Yokozuna — Ōzeki — Sekiwake — Komusubi — Maegashira

== See also ==
- Glossary of sumo terms
- List of past sumo wrestlers
- List of sumo tournament top division champions
