= Hananosato Yukio =

Sumo wrestler

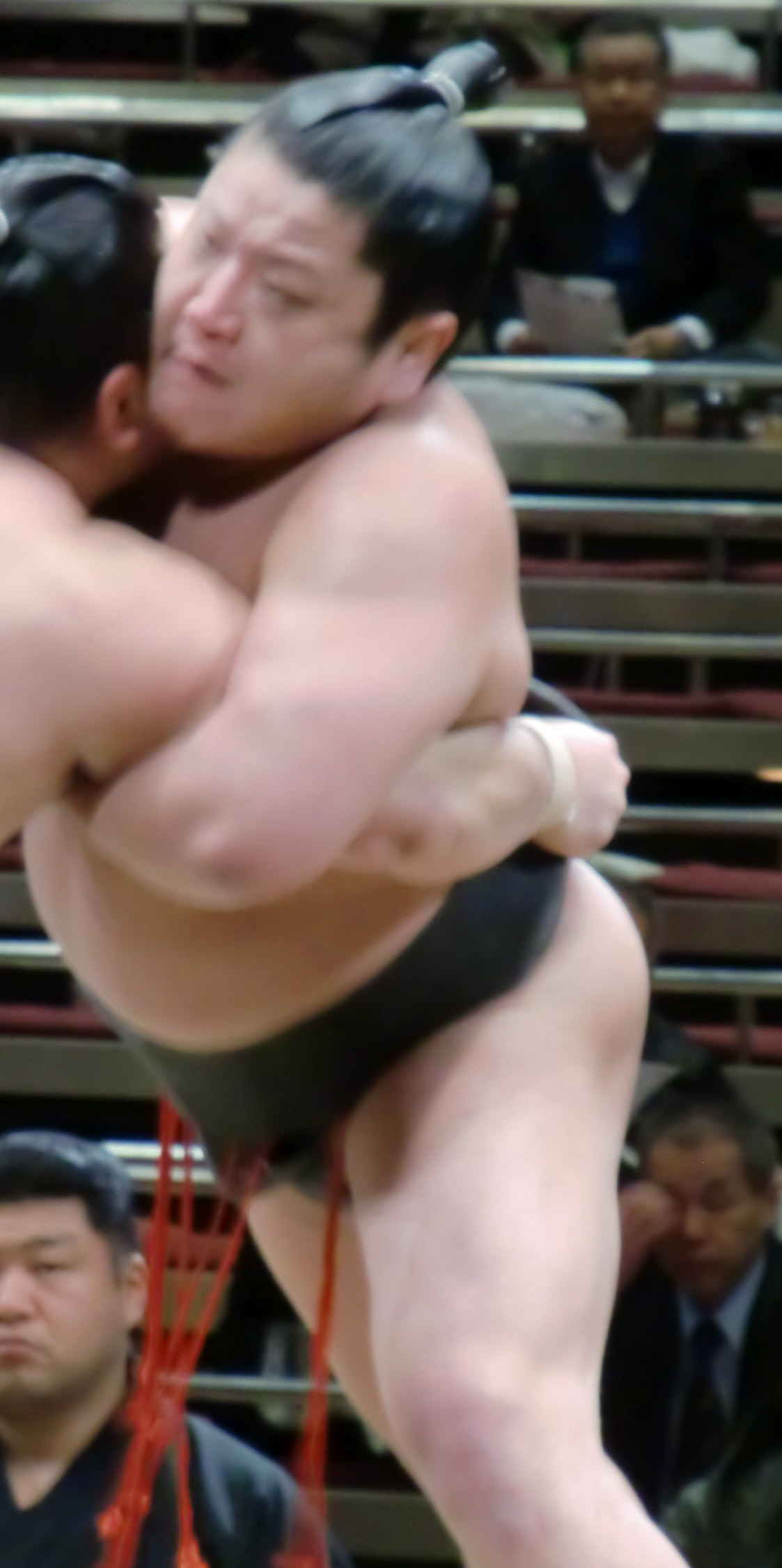

Personal information
- Native name: 塙ノ里 幸与
- Born: Yukio Murakami; 8 May 1983 (age 43) Ibaraki, Japan
- Height: 1.78 m (5 ft 10 in)
- Weight: 114 kg (251 lb; 18.0 st)

Sport
- Sport: Sumo
- Retired: May, 2010
- Heya: Takasago
- Record: 243-214-12
- Debut: March, 1999
- Highest rank: Makushita 8 (March, 2005)
- Updated on May 2010

Hananosato Yukio (塙ノ里 幸与, born 8 May 1983 as Yukio Murakami) is a former sumo wrestler from Hitachi, Ibaraki, Japan. He made his debut in March 1999, retiring in May 2010. His highest rank was makushita 8.

== Career ==
He did judo at junior high school. He made his professional debut in March 1999, an entry class that also included ōzeki Kotomitsuki, komusubi Takamisakari and former maegashira Wakakirin. He initially fought under his own surname of Murakami, switching to Hananosato in January 2000. His highest rank was makushita 8, which he achieved in March 2005 after achieving seven straight kachi-koshi or winning records. This brought him close to sekitori status, but he was unable to achieve the necessary number of wins to earn promotion to the second highest jūryō division, scoring only one win against six losses at the March 2005 tournament. He was a junior member of the Takasago stable, home to yokozuna Asashoryu, and he served as one of Asashoryu's tsukebito, or personal attendants. He was in the fourth sandanme division from March 2006 until September 2007, and again from July to September 2008 after he was forced to pull out of the May 2008 tournament with an injury after only one bout. He fell to sandanme again in July 2009. At just 114 kg, very light for a sumo wrestler, he seemed to lack the weight necessary to make it to the top. In January 2010, he managed to again gain promotion to the makushita division, but after struggling again in this division he announced his retirement at the end of the May 2010 tournament.

Hananosato performed the (yumitori-shiki) or bow-twirling ceremony as a back-up to fellow Takasago stable wrestler Ōga. When Ōga suddenly retired in May 2007, Hananosato stepped in to perform the ceremony on a regional tour of Hawaii in June.

== Fighting style ==
Hananosato's most common winning kimarite or technique was yori-kiri, or force out, but he was also fond of throws, both the underarm throw, shitatenage, and the overarm throw, uwatenage. He also used rare leg trips and sweeps more usually associated with Mongolian sumo wrestlers, such as ashitori (leg pick) and nimaigeri (ankle kicking twist down).

== Career record ==
Hananosato Yukio
| Year | January Hatsu basho, Tokyo | March Haru basho, Osaka | May Natsu basho, Tokyo | July Nagoya basho, Nagoya | September Aki basho, Tokyo | November Kyūshū basho, Fukuoka |
|---|---|---|---|---|---|---|
| 1999 | x | (Maezumo) | West Jonokuchi #18; 4–3 | West Jonidan #151; 5–2 | East Jonidan #106; 4–3 | East Jonidan #83; 4–3 |
| 2000 | East Jonidan #58; 4–3 | West Jonidan #32; 2–5 | West Jonidan #58; 4–3 | East Jonidan #36; 4–3 | East Jonidan #15; 5–2 | East Sandanme #82; 3–4 |
| 2001 | East Jonidan #6; 5–2 | West Sandanme #70; 2–5 | East Sandanme #93; 5–2 | East Sandanme #60; 3–4 | East Sandanme #78; 4–3 | West Sandanme #61; 6–1 |
| 2002 | East Sandanme #9; 2–5 | West Sandanme #33; 3–4 | West Sandanme #54; 4–3 | East Sandanme #41; 4–3 | West Sandanme #28; 4–3 | West Sandanme #14; 3–4 |
| 2003 | West Sandanme #32; 3–4 | East Sandanme #51; 6–1 | East Sandanme #3; 3–4 | West Sandanme #14; 5–2 | East Makushita #52; 3–4 | East Sandanme #5; 3–4 |
| 2004 | East Sandanme #18; 6–1 | East Makushita #40; 4–3 | West Makushita #34; 4–3 | West Makushita #29; 4–3 | West Makushita #22; 5–2 | West Makushita #15; 4–3 |
| 2005 | East Makushita #10; 4–3 | East Makushita #8; 1–6 | West Makushita #28; 3–4 | West Makushita #34; 4–3 | West Makushita #28; 3–4 | East Makushita #36; 2–5 |
| 2006 | East Makushita #53; 1–6 | East Sandanme #19; 3–4 | West Sandanme #36; Sat out due to injury 0–0–7 | East Sandanme #97; 5–2 | East Sandanme #65; 6–1 | West Sandanme #10; 3–4 |
| 2007 | West Sandanme #27; 3–4 | West Sandanme #43; 5–2 | East Sandanme #15; 4–3 | East Sandanme #5; 4–3 | East Makushita #56; 4–3 | West Makushita #48; 3–4 |
| 2008 | East Makushita #56; 6–1 | East Makushita #25; 2–5 | West Makushita #41; 1–1–5 | West Sandanme #12; 3–4 | West Sandanme #25; 5–2 | West Makushita #58; 4–3 |
| 2009 | West Makushita #48; 4–3 | West Makushita #40; 2–5 | East Makushita #56; 3–4 | East Sandanme #7; 3–4 | East Sandanme #23; 4–3 | East Sandanme #10; 6–1 |
| 2010 | West Makushita #34; 3–4 | East Makushita #41; 4–3 | West Makushita #31; Retired; 1–6 | x | x | x |
Record given as wins–losses–absences Top division champion Top division runner-up Retired Lower divisions Non-participation Sanshō key: F=Fighting spirit; O=Outstanding performance; T=Technique Also shown: ★=Kinboshi; P=Playoff(s); Divisions: Makuuchi — Jūryō — Makushita — Sandanme — Jonidan — Jonokuchi Makuuchi ranks: Yokozuna — Ōzeki — Sekiwake — Komusubi — Maegashira

== See also ==
- Glossary of sumo terms
- List of past sumo wrestlers
