= Yōtsukasa Dai =

Japanese sumo wrestler (1973–2025)

Personal information
- Native name: 燁司 大
- Born: Daishi Suzuki; 23 September 1973 Matsusaka, Mie, Japan
- Died: 11 August 2025 (aged 51)
- Height: 1.78 m (5 ft 10 in)
- Weight: 149 kg (328 lb)

Sport
- Sport: Sumo
- University team: Nihon University
- Retired: November 2005
- Heya: Irumagawa
- Record: 357-379-12
- Debut: January 1996
- Highest rank: Maegashira 11 (January 2004)
- Elder name: See retirement

Yōtsukasa Dai (born Daishi Suzuki; 23 September 1973 – 11 August 2025) was a Japanese sumo wrestler from Matsusaka, Mie. He made his professional debut in January 1996, and reached the top division in May 1999. His highest rank was maegashira 11. He retired in November 2005. He became an elder of the Japan Sumo Association and worked as a coach at Irumagawa stable, leaving in 2012.

== Career ==
Dai began doing sumo from the fourth grade of elementary school. At Nihon University he was a member of the Nichi-Dai Sumo Club and was in the same year as Kaihō. Because of his amateur achievements he was given special dispensation to begin his professional career at the bottom of the third highest makushita division. He joined Irumagawa stable, run by another Nihon University graduate, ex-sekiwake Tochitsukasa. He made his debut in January 1996, fighting under his own surname of Suzuki. Upon reaching sekitori status in May 1998 he switched to the shikona of Yōtsukasa, the tsukasa suffix being a common one at his stable. His stablemaster liked the combination of the "fire" and "flower" kanji, hoping that his sumo would "ignite fire and transform himself as a brilliant flower". He reached the top makuuchi division a year later in May 1999. He withdrew injured from his third top division tournament and was demoted back to the jūryō division as a result. In November 2001 he lost sekitori status altogether after a 3–12 record at Jūryō 11 but he returned to the jūryō division in November 2002 and was promoted back to the makuuchi division in May 2003 after an absence of 22 tournaments. His last appearance in the top division was in March 2004.

== Retirement and death ==
Yōksukasa's final tournament was in November 2005. Ranked right at the bottom of the jūryō division at no. 14 East, he lost every one of his first fourteen matches, defaulting on the final day to end with a rare 0–15 record. He was the first sekitori to suffer this embarrassing score since Hoshitango in 2000. He immediately announced his retirement rather than face demotion to makushita.

Yōtsukasa was unable to acquire permanent elder stock in the Japan Sumo Association and so had to borrow elder names owned by active wrestlers or stable-masters. He was variously known as Yōtsukasa (jun-toshiyori), Hatachiyama (owned by Tochinohana), Wakafuji (Otsukasa), Sekinoto (Iwakiyama), Onogawa (Kitanoumi), Sendagawa, (Maenoyama) and Takenawa (Tochinonada). He was finally forced to leave the Sumo Association in January 2012 when Tochinonada retired and no other elder names were available. He later worked for a cleaning company in Tokyo.

On 12 August 2025, it was announced that Yōtsukasa died on 11 August, following a long period of illness. He was 51.

== Fighting style ==
Yōtsukasa was an oshi-sumo specialist, preferring tsuki-oshi (pushing and thrusting) techniques to fighting on the mawashi or belt. He won most of his bouts by a straightforward oshi-dashi, or push out, although his personal favourite was tsuki-otoshi, or thrust over.

== Career record ==
Yōtsukasa Dai
Year	January Hatsu basho, Tokyo	March Haru basho, Osaka	May Natsu basho, Tokyo	July Nagoya basho, Nagoya	September Aki basho, Tokyo	November Kyūshū basho, Fukuoka
1996	Makushita tsukedashi #60; 6–1	East Makushita #31; 3–4	East Makushita #42; 4–3	West Makushita #32; 4–3	West Makushita #21; 4–3	West Makushita #13; 1–6
1997	West Makushita #38; 3–4	West Makushita #48; 6–1–P	East Makushita #22; 6–1–P	West Makushita #8; 5–2	East Makushita #4; 4–3	East Makushita #2; 3–4
1998	East Makushita #6; 4–3	East Makushita #5; 6–1	West Jūryō #12; 9–6	West Jūryō #8; 7–8	East Jūryō #11; 9–6	West Jūryō #7; 7–8
1999	West Jūryō #9; 9–6	West Jūryō #1; 8–7	East Maegashira #15; 9–6	East Maegashira #12; 7–8	West Maegashira #13; 0–3–12	East Jūryō #7; 9–6
2000	West Jūryō #2; 3–12	West Jūryō #10; 8–7	East Jūryō #6; 8–7	East Jūryō #5; 6–9	West Jūryō #7; 5–10	West Jūryō #11; 9–6
2001	East Jūryō #5; 7–8	West Jūryō #5; 6–9	West Jūryō #7; 8–7	West Jūryō #4; 6–9	West Jūryō #7; 6–9	East Jūryō #11; 3–12
2002	East Makushita #8; 3–4	East Makushita #14; 4–3	East Makushita #12; 4–3	East Makushita #8; 5–2	West Makushita #2; 5–2	West Jūryō #10; 9–6
2003	East Jūryō #7; 10–5	West Jūryō #1; 9–6	East Maegashira #13; 6–9	East Jūryō #1; 8–7	West Maegashira #13; 7–8	West Maegashira #15; 9–6
2004	East Maegashira #11; 5–10	East Maegashira #17; 6–9	East Jūryō #3; 6–9	East Jūryō #5; 7–8	West Jūryō #6; 8–7	West Jūryō #5; 4–11
2005	West Jūryō #9; 6–9	West Jūryō #12; 8–7	East Jūryō #10; 7–8	West Jūryō #11; 6–9	West Jūryō #13; 7–8	East Jūryō #14; Retired; 0–15
Record given as wins–losses–absences Top division champion Top division runner-up Retired Lower divisions Non-participation Sanshō key: F=Fighting spirit; O=Outstanding performance; T=Technique Also shown: ★=Kinboshi; P=Playoff(s); Divisions: Makuuchi — Jūryō — Makushita — Sandanme — Jonidan — Jonokuchi Makuuchi ranks: Yokozuna — Ōzeki — Sekiwake — Komusubi — Maegashira

== See also ==
- Glossary of sumo terms
- List of past sumo wrestlers
