= Ōga Atsushi =

Japanese rikishi (born 1977)

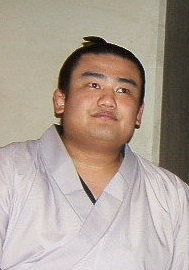

Personal information
- Born: Atsushi Moriyasu; 22 October 1977 (age 48) Fukuoka, Japan
- Height: 1.80 m (5 ft 11 in)
- Weight: 123 kg (271 lb)

Sport
- Sport: Sumo
- Retired: May, 2007
- Heya: Takasago
- Record: 329–307–0
- Debut: March, 1993
- Highest rank: Jūryō 6 (November, 2006)
- Updated on December 2007

Ōga Atsushi (born 22 October 1977 as Atsushi Moriyasu) is a former sumo wrestler from Nogata, Fukuoka, Japan. His highest rank was jūryō 6. He was well known to sumo audiences for his performance of the bow twirling ceremony (yumitori-shiki) which takes place at the end of every tournament day, a role he began in 2004. It is normally performed by an apprentice ranked in the makushita division or below, but Ōga continued to do it even after promotion to the jūryō division.

== Career ==
He was born Atushi Moriyasu in Nōgata, Fukuoka, the same city that ōzeki Kaiō came from, and they went to the same middle school. Moriyasu admired Kaiō greatly and when he joined professional sumo he deliberately avoided Kaiō's Tomozuna stable, hoping to one day face him in a tournament. He chose Takasago stable instead and made his first appearance at the March tournament of 1993, fighting under his family name of Moriyasu. He was just 1.74 m (5 ft 8 1/2 in) tall and weighed only 90 kg (200 lb) in his debut tournament. In the lower divisions he served as a tsukebito or personal attendant to a number of senior wrestlers in Takasago stable such as Mitoizumi and Toki. In May 2001 he changed his shikona to Ōga, with the "ō" character taken from his idol Kaiō and second "ki" from Toki, which can also be read as "ga." He changed the second part of his shikona from Atsushi to Akitoshi at the same time. He was to change this again to Tosa and then finally Atsushi once more, his real given name.

He took over the yumitori-shiki role from Musashifuji in January 2004, as it is normally done by a low-ranking wrestler from the same stable as a yokozuna, and Musashigawa stable's Musashimaru had recently retired, leaving Asashōryū of Takasago stable as the only yokozuna. Ōga went on to perform the ceremony 300 times over 20 tournaments. In March 2006 he was promoted to the jūryō division. He was the first yumitori-shiki performer to reach sekitori status since Tomoefuji in July 1990. Tomoefuji stopped doing the ceremony upon reaching jūryō, but Ōga was happy to keep doing it, the first time a sekitori had done so since Hanakago stable's Itakura performed it for one tournament in March 1975. He scored 10–5 in his jūryō debut and took part in a three-way playoff for the championship with Hōchiyama and Toyozakura, winning the initial bout but then losing twice to his rivals. He fought in the jūryō division for six tournaments in total, with a 42–48 record.

== Retirement from sumo ==
Ōga announced his intention to retire on 25 March 2007, after it was clear that a 5–10 record in the Osaka tournament would see him demoted to the makushita division. He commented, "I performed the yumitori ceremony today as if it was just like any other day. When I was promoted to jūryō, I decided I'd retire if I fall down to makushita. Since there is nothing wrong with me physically, there is not much I can do as I can no longer win. I have been able to see the yokozuna win yusho from a close vantage point. It's been a great experience. I have no regrets whatsoever on my 15 years of rikishi life." However, he did not immediately submit retirement papers, in order to collect a salary for April and also take part in the regional tour that month. He officially retired in May, and his danpatsu-shiki or retirement ceremony was held at the Ryogoku Kokugikan on June 3, 2007. After leaving sumo he opened a chanko restaurant in Nakama and took part in some pro wrestling competitions in Fukuoka.

== Personal life ==
He married in 2006 and has a son.

== Fighting style ==
Ōga liked a migi-yotsu (left hand outside, right hand inside) grip on his opponent's mawashi. He specialized in kuisagari, a tactic used by smaller wrestlers which involved pushing his head against the opponent's chest while pushing on the front part of the mawashi. His most common winning kimarite were yori-kiri (force out), oshi-dashi (push out), hataki-komi (slap down) and uwate-nage (overarm throw).

== Career record ==
Ōga Atsushi
Year	January Hatsu basho, Tokyo	March Haru basho, Osaka	May Natsu basho, Tokyo	July Nagoya basho, Nagoya	September Aki basho, Tokyo	November Kyūshū basho, Fukuoka
1993	x	(Maezumo)	East Jonokuchi #41; 3–4	West Jonokuchi #33; 5–2	West Jonidan #169; 1–6	East Jonokuchi #21; 2–5
1994	West Jonokuchi #39; 5–2	East Jonidan #153; 4–3	West Jonidan #120; 2–5	West Jonidan #157; 5–2	East Jonidan #108; 4–3	West Jonidan #77; 5–2
1995	East Jonidan #32; 2–5	East Jonidan #64; 2–5	West Jonidan #95; 5–2	East Jonidan #42; 4–3	East Jonidan #22; 4–3	East Sandanme #100; 4–3
1996	West Sandanme #81; 2–5	East Jonidan #8; 5–2	East Sandanme #72; 2–5	West Jonidan #3; 3–4	East Jonidan #21; 4–3	East Jonidan #1; 4–3
1997	West Sandanme #80; 4–3	West Sandanme #59; 5–2	East Sandanme #32; 3–4	East Sandanme #46; 3–4	East Sandanme #65; 3–4	West Sandanme #80; 4–3
1998	West Sandanme #62; 4–3	East Sandanme #45; 4–3	East Sandanme #31; 4–3	West Sandanme #17; 2–5	East Sandanme #42; 4–3	East Sandanme #29; 4–3
1999	West Sandanme #15; 4–3	West Sandanme #2; 4–3	West Makushita #52; 3–4	West Sandanme #3; 3–4	East Sandanme #13; 3–4	West Sandanme #27; 4–3
2000	East Sandanme #15; 3–4	East Sandanme #30; 5–2	East Sandanme #6; 6–1	East Makushita #35; 4–3	West Makushita #27; 4–3	East Makushita #19; 2–5
2001	West Makushita #38; 3–4	East Makushita #49; 5–2	East Makushita #33; 4–3	West Makushita #24; 4–3	West Makushita #19; 4–3	West Makushita #17; 5–2
2002	West Makushita #9; 3–4	West Makushita #15; 3–4	East Makushita #23; 3–4	East Makushita #31; 3–4	East Makushita #41; 5–2	East Makushita #24; 3–4
2003	East Makushita #34; 4–3	East Makushita #27; 5–2	West Makushita #13; 1–6	East Makushita #33; 4–3	East Makushita #27; 4–3	West Makushita #22; 4–3
2004	West Makushita #13; 4–3	East Makushita #10; 3–4	East Makushita #16; 2–5	West Makushita #28; 3–4	West Makushita #37; 5–2	West Makushita #24; 3–4
2005	West Makushita #30; 2–5	West Makushita #51; 6–1–PP	West Makushita #22; 4–3	East Makushita #17; 5–2	East Makushita #10; 4–3	East Makushita #8; 3–4
2006	East Makushita #11; 5–2	East Makushita #4; 5–2	East Jūryō #13; 10–5–PPP	West Jūryō #7; 6–9	East Jūryō #10; 9–6	East Jūryō #6; 6–9
2007	West Jūryō #11; 6–9	West Jūryō #14; 5–10	East Makushita #5; Retired –	x	x	x
Record given as wins–losses–absences Top division champion Top division runner-up Retired Lower divisions Non-participation Sanshō key: F=Fighting spirit; O=Outstanding performance; T=Technique Also shown: ★=Kinboshi; P=Playoff(s); Divisions: Makuuchi — Jūryō — Makushita — Sandanme — Jonidan — Jonokuchi Makuuchi ranks: Yokozuna — Ōzeki — Sekiwake — Komusubi — Maegashira

== See also ==
- Glossary of sumo terms
- List of past sumo wrestlers
