= List of past sumo wrestlers =

This is a list of prominent past wrestlers (either retired or deceased) in the sport of professional sumo. They are listed in order of the year and tournament month that they made their professional debuts. The information listed below was gleaned from the wrestlers' individual articles; refer to their links for more details.

== List ==
Ring name	Entered	Retired	Highest rank	Stable	Career and other notes
Akashi Shiganosuke	1624?	1643?	Yokozuna	N.A.	yokozuna status conferred centuries later, historical existence disputed
Ayagawa Gorōji	1715?	1745?	Yokozuna	N.A.	yokozuna status historically conferred, actual yokozuna license never proven
Maruyama Gondazaemon	1735?	1749-11	Yokozuna	Nanatsumori	yokozuna status historically conferred, died while an active wrestler
Miyagino Nishikinosuke	1766-10	1796-3	Sekiwake	Sanoyama	oldest top division wrestler at the age of 52, first Miyagino stablemaster
Tanikaze Kajinosuke	1769-4	1794-11	Yokozuna	Isenoumi	streak of 63 wins held for 150 years, died while active
Onogawa Kisaburō	1779-10	1798-10	Yokozuna	Tamagaki	first yokozuna to perform dohyo-iri along with Tanikaze
Raiden Tameemon	1790-11	1811-2	Ōzeki	Urakaze (Isenoumi)	considered one of the best wrestlers ever, but never promoted to yokozuna, likely for political reasons
Kashiwado Risuke	1806-10	1825-1	Ōzeki	Isenoumi	rejected a yokozuna license to avoid conflict between prominent families
Tamagaki Gakunosuke	1806-10	1824-8	Ōzeki	Tamagaki	like Kashiwado, a yokozuna strength wrestler who had to reject a license
Ōnomatsu Midorinosuke	1815-3	1835-11	Yokozuna	Takekuma	was often criticized for number of false starts
Inazuma	1821-2	1839-11	Yokozuna	Sadogatake	received yokozuna licenses from Gojo family and Yoshida family
Tsurugizan Taniemon	1827-3	1852-2	Ōzeki	Onomatsu	offered a yokozuna license but rejected it
Hidenoyama Raigorō	1828-3	1850-3	Yokozuna	Hidenoyama	shortest yokozuna ever, wrestlers outside his stable once staged a strike against his authority
Shiranui Dakuemon	1830-11	1844-1	Yokozuna	Urakaze	coach of Shiranui Kōemon
Unryū Kyūkichi	1847-11	1865-2	Yokozuna	Oitekaze	unryū dohyō-iri style named for him
Jinmaku	1850-11	1867-11	Yokozuna	Hidenoyama	erected monument to former yokozuna, first time first 3 yokozuna recognized
Shiranui Kōemon	1850-11	1869-11	Yokozuna	Sakaigawa	considered the actual innovator of the unryū dohyō-iri style
Kimenzan Tanigorō	1852-2	1870-11	Yokozuna	Takekuma	at 43 oldest wrestler ever to be promoted to yokozuna
Sakaigawa Namiemon	1857-11	1881-1	Yokozuna	Sakaigawa	a number of dubious yokozuna titles were awarded in his period, diluting the integrity of the title, his title is the only one from his time still recognized
Takasago Uragorō	1863-07	1873-12	Maegashira 1	Chiganoura	one of the first great reformers of professional sumo, and founder of Takasago stable
Umegatani I	1871-3	1885-5	Yokozuna	Ikazuchi	died at 83, longest-lived yokozuna after retirement, helped build first Ryōgoku Kokugikan
Nishinoumi Kajirō I	1882-1	1896-1	Yokozuna	Takasago	first wrestler actually listed on banzuke at the rank of yokozuna
Konishiki Yasokichi I	1883-5	1901-1	Yokozuna	Takasago	although competitive, never won a championship as yokozuna
Ōzutsu Man'emon	1885-1	1908-1	Yokozuna	Oguruma	strength greatly declined after fighting in Russo-Japanese War
Onigatani Saiji	1886-1	1907-1	Komusubi	Ikazuchi	retired from active sumo aged 51
Wakashima	1891-5	1907-1	Yokozuna	Tomozuna; Nakamura	first official yokozuna from Osaka sumo, retired young due to a cycling accident
Hitachiyama	1892-6	1914-5	Yokozuna	Dewanoumi	last wrestler to win over .900 of his bouts in top division, considered to be the most honorable yokozuna ever by many, did much to increase the popularity of sumo
Umegatani II	1892-6	1915-5	Yokozuna	Ikazuchi	youngest ever yokozuna at that time
Araiwa Kamenosuke	1894-1	1909-1	Ōzeki	Oguruma	had a winning average of over .800
Takamiyama Torinosuke	1895-6	1913-5	Sekiwake	Takasago	won first officially recognized sumo top division championship
Tamatsubaki Kentaro	1897-1	1916-1	Sekiwake	Ikazuchi	at 158 cm, the shortest wrestler in history
Ōnishiki Daigorō	1898-11	1922-1	Yokozuna	Asahiyama	active in Osaka sumo
Ōkido Moriemon	1899-9	1914-1	Yokozuna	Minato	only yokozuna who spent his whole career in Osaka sumo
Nishinoumi Kajirō II	1900-1	1918-5	Yokozuna	Izutsu	oldest wrestler to be promoted to yokozuna in the 20th century, committed suicide later in life
Tachiyama	1900-5	1918-1	Yokozuna	Tomozuna	never had a losing tournament in 18-year career, only lost 3 bouts as a yokozuna
Ōtori Tanigorō	1903-5	1920-5	Yokozuna	Miyagino	has a monument built for him in Inzai, Chiba
Ryōgoku Yūjirō	1909-6	1924-1	Sekiwake	Dewanoumi	only wrestler to win the top division on his first attempt since the 1909 yusho system was established
Ōnishiki Uichirō	1910-1	1923-1	Yokozuna	Dewanoumi	reached yokozuna after only 5 top division tournaments which is an all-time record, trained under Hitachiyama
Nishinoumi Kajirō III	1910-1	1928-10	Yokozuna	Izutsu	promoted to yokozuna without winning any championships, which caused controversy
Tsunenohana	1910-1	1930-10	Yokozuna	Dewanoumi	attempted suicide as a sumo elder after being blamed for JSA troubles
Miyagiyama	1910-6	1931-1	Yokozuna	Takadagawa	achieved fame in Osaka, helped save integrity of much maligned Osaka sumo by achieving success in Tokyo after Osaka sumo was disbanded
Tochigiyama	1911-2	1925-5	Yokozuna	Dewanoumi	lost only 3 bouts in rise to top division, ended the 56-victory streak of Tachiyama
Toyokuni Fukuma	1915-1	1930-10	Ōzeki	Izutsu	only had two losing tournaments in his rise to ōzeki, had two makunouchi championships
Shimizugawa	1917-1	1937-5	Ōzeki	Hatachiyama	won three top division championships, but never promoted to yokozuna
Hitachiiwa Eitarō	1917-5	1931-3	Ōzeki	Dewanoumi	his only tournament championship caused great controversy
Tamanishiki	1919-1	1938-12	Yokozuna	Nishonoseki	one of very few top division wrestlers who did not walk out in a strike, later brought great success to Nishonoseki stable as head
Tenryū Saburō	1920-1	1931-10	Sekiwake	Dewanoumi	also an accomplished scholar, after being expelled as a leader of the Shunjuen Incident started an independent Ōsaka sumo group, and later became a pioneer in Aikido
Kagamiiwa Zenshirō	1922-5	1939-5	Ōzeki	Kumegawa	discovered and mentored future yokozuna Kagamisato
Minanogawa Tōzō	1924-1	1942-1	Yokozuna	Takasago; Sadogatake	popular with public but won no championships at yokozuna rank
Dewanohana I	1925-1	1940-7	Maegashira 1	Dewanoumi	went on to become chairman of the Japan Sumo Association from 1968–1974
Musashiyama Takeshi	1926-1	1939-5	Yokozuna	Dewanoumi	promotion considered controversial by some, had only one kachi-koshi at yokozuna rank
Futabayama	1927-3	1945-11	Yokozuna	Tatsunami	won 69 consecutive bouts, the longest run in the history of sumo, after retirement admitted was blind in one eye
Dewaminato I	1928-3	1944-11	Sekiwake	Dewanoumi	took the championship in the same tournament Futabayama's winning streak was ended
Maedayama	1929-1	1949-10	Yokozuna	Takasago	former head of Takasago stable
Akinoumi Setsuo	1932-2	1946-11	Yokozuna	Dewanoumi	ended the 69-bout win streak of Futabayama
Nayoroiwa	1932-5	1954-10	Ōzeki	Tatsunami	stablemate of Futabayama, fought until age forty, established Kasugayama stable after retirement
Haguroyama	1934-1	1953-9	Yokozuna	Tatsunami	longest serving yokozuna in history until surpassed by Hakuhō in 2019
Saganohana	1934-5	1952-1	Ōzeki	Kumegawa→Nishonoseki	defeated four yokozuna in one tournament, coached Taihō, among other sumo greats
Terukuni	1935-1	1953-1	Yokozuna	Isegahama	youngest yokozuna ever until Taihō
Masuiyama Daishirō I	1935-1	1950-1	Ōzeki	Dewanoumi	father of ozeki Masuiyama Daishiro II, coach of Kitanoumi
Azumafuji Kin'ichi	1936-1	1954-9	Yokozuna	Takasago	first yokozuna to turn to pro-wrestling after retiring
Bishūyama	1936-1	1955-3	Sekiwake	Isegahama, Araiso	winner of the 1945 Summer tournament cut short due to Allied bombings
Mitsuneyama	1937-5	1960-1	Ōzeki	Takashima	later head coach of Takashima stable
Tamanoumi Daitaro	1937-5	1961-1	Sekiwake	Nishonoseki	first wrestler to wear a brightly colored mawashi, flouting JSA rules and won first championship with 15-0 record while wearing it, had 9 gold stars in career
Kotonishiki Noboru	1938-1	1955-5	Komusubi	Nishonoseki	founder of Sadogatake stable, trained yokozuna Kotozakura
Toyonishiki	1938-1	1945-11	Maegashira 17	Dewanoumi	first Japanese-American to reach the top division
Yoshibayama	1938-5	1958-1	Yokozuna	Takashima	though successful, he overall ability was hindered by injuries from World War II before he entered sumo
Tochinishiki	1939-1	1960-5	Yokozuna	Kasugano	known for small size and his tenacity, once fought back from seven straight losses to win his kachi-koshi
Kitanonada	1940-1	1962-3	Sekiwake	Tatsunami	won ten career kinboshi, retired at age 39
Rikidōzan	1940-5	1950-9	Sekiwake	Nishonoseki	after retiring, moved on to become "the father of pro-wrestling in Japan"
Tokitsuyama	1940-5	1961-3	Sekiwake	Tatsunami	makuuchi champion, known for using a variety of rare techniques
Kagamisato	1941-1	1958-1	Yokozuna	Tokitsukaze	died at age 80, one of the longest-lived former yokozuna
Matsunobori	1941-1	1961-11	Ōzeki	Oyama	head of small Oyama stable after retirement
Chiyonoyama	1942-1	1959-1	Yokozuna	Dewanoumi	founded Kokonoe stable
Dewanishiki	1942-1	1956-11	Sekiwake	Dewanoumi	had 10 gold stars, held komusubi rank 9 times before reaching sekiwake
Wakabayama	1942-1	1961-1	Komusubi	Tokitsukaze	earned four gold stars, three grandsons all became rikishi
Ōuchiyama	1944-1	1959-3	Ōzeki	Tokitsukaze	one of the tallest wrestlers ever at 202 cm
Kotogahama	1945-11	1962-11	Ōzeki	Nishonoseki	five times a top division tournament runner-up, turned down opportunity to run Sadogatake stable
Wakanohana	1946-11	1962-5	Yokozuna	Nishonoseki; Shibatayama; Hanakago	former head of JSA, one of lightest yokozuna, older brother of Takanohana Kenshi
Toyonobori	1947-6	1954-9	Maegashira 15	Izutsu	went on to become a well-known professional wrestler
Tsurugamine	1947-6	1967-7	Sekiwake	Tomozuna	holds record for most technique prizes at 10, had ten gold stars
Asashio III	1948-10	1962-1	Yokozuna	Takasago	former head of Takasago stable
Wakahaguro	1949-10	1965-3	Ōzeki	Tatsunami	died of stroke after retiring at age 34
Annenyama	1950-1	1965-3	Sekiwake	Tatsunami	former head of Tatsunami stable, earned 10 gold stars
Fusanishiki	1952-1	1967-1	Sekiwake	Wakamatsu; Nishiiwa; Wakamatsu	former head coach of Wakamatsu stable 1979–1990
Oikawa	1952-1	1962-5	Maegashira 10	Onoe; Takasago	two-time jūryō champion
Tochihikari	1952-5	1966-1	Ōzeki	Kasugano	member of Kasugano stable, an ōzeki for 22 tournaments
Iwakaze	1952-5	1965-9	Sekiwake	Wakamatsu; Nishiiwa; Wakamatsu	jūryō champion
Wakakoma	1952-5	1962-3	Maegashira 8	Nishonoseki; Shibatayama; Hanakago	jūryō champion
Kanenohana	1952-5	1967-9	Komusubi	Dewanoumi	jūryō champion
Maedagawa	1952-9	1967-5	Sekiwake	Takasago	runner-up in two top division tournaments
Kiyonomori	1953-1	1967-5	Maegashira 9	Isegahama	two-time jūryō champion, former head coach of Kise stable
Aonosato	1953-3	1969-3	Sekiwake	Tokitsukaze	two-time jūryō champion, former head coach of Tatsutagawa stable 1988–2000
Fujinishiki	1953-3	1968-11	Komusubi	Takasago	former head of Takasago stable, coached Konishiki, Mitoizumi to top division
Wakasugiyama	1953-3	1967-5	Maegashira 1	Nishonoseki; Shibatayama; Hanakago	jūryō champion
Wakanokuni	1953-3	1969-9	Maegashira 8	Shibatayama; Hanakago	three-time jūryō champion
Oiteyama	1953-5	1969-5	Maegashira 6	Oitekaze; Tatsunami	jūryō champion
Kiminishiki	1953-5	1968-5	Maegashira 3	Tatsunami	jūryō champion
Kitabayama	1954-5	1966-5	Ōzeki	Tokitsukaze	held ōzeki rank for 30 tournaments
Kashiwado	1954-9	1969-7	Yokozuna	Isenoumi	former director of JSA, overshadowed by rival Taihō
Udagawa	1954-9	1967-7	Maegashira 3	Takashima; Yoshibayama; Miyagino	jūryō champion
Myōbudani	1954-3	1969-11	Sekiwake	Miyagino	took part in two top division championship playoffs
Wakachichibu	1954-5	1968-11	Sekiwake	Hanakago	two-time jūryō champion, won two special prizes, former elder in the JSA
Wakamisugi	1955-3	1967-5	Sekiwake	Hanakago	won a top division championship from the maegashira ranks
Wakatenryū	1955-3	1969-7	Maegashira 1	Hanakago	two-time jūryō champion
Niigiyama	1955-3	1963-5	Maegashira 11	Tokitsukaze	two-time jūryō champion
Kainoyama	1955-5	1970-1	Sekiwake	Onogawa; Dewanoumi	winner of six special prizes and five gold stars
Okanoyama	1955-5	1965-1	Maegashira 5	Tokitsukaze	jūryō champion
Amatsukaze	1955-5	1967-5	Maegashira 3	Tokitsukaze	two-time jūryō champion
Tochinoumi	1955-9	1966-11	Yokozuna	Kasugano	former head of Kasugano stable, one of lightest yokozuna ever
Hagurohana	1955-9	1965-11	Sekiwake	Tatsunami	former elder in the JSA
Sadanoyama	1956-1	1968-3	Yokozuna	Dewanoumi	former head of JSA
Kairyūyama	1956-3	1968-3	Sekiwake	Araiso; Isegahama	jūryō champion, won eight gold stars
Daimonji	1956-3	1973-7	Maegashira 5	Nakamura; Nishonoseki	jūryō champion, former Nishiiwa-oyakata
Daiyū	1956-5	1972-9	Maegashira 1	Izutsu	two-time jūryō champion, founder of Kabutoyama stable
Azumanishiki	1956-5	1967-9	Maegashira 15	Takasago	jūryō champion, one tournament in the top division
Tensuiyama	1956-5	1968-9	Maegashira 10	Araiso; Isegahama	two-time jūryō champion
Kiyokuni	1956-9	1974-1	Ōzeki	Isegahama	former head of Isegahama stable
Taihō	1956-9	1971-5	Yokozuna	Nishonoseki	won 32 championships which stood as record until 2015, at the time was youngest yokozuna ever at 21
Sawahikari	1956-9	1964-11	Komusubi	Tokitsukaze	jūryō champion
Tamaarashi	1956-9	1967-7	Maegashira 4	Nishonoseki; Kataonami	two-time jūryō champion
Kitanofuji	1957-1	1974-7	Yokozuna	Dewanoumi; Kokonoe	former head of Kokonoe stable, coached Chiyonofuji and Hokutoumi to yokozuna
Ryūko	1957-1	1975-5	Komusubi	Hanakago	after retiring, found success as a TV actor
Wakanami	1957-3	1972-3	Komusubi	Tatsunami	only 103 kg at peak weight
Kōtetsuyama	1957-3	1975-1	Sekiwake	Asahiyama	jūryō champion, founder of Onaruto stable
Asasegawa	1957-5	1971-5	Maegashira 1	Araiso; Isegahama	two-time jūryō champion, former elder in the JSA
Wakamiyama	1957-11	1969-11	Sekiwake	Tatsunami	jūryō champion
Fukunohana	1958-1	1975-11	Sekiwake	Dewanoumi	won seven special prizes and five gold stars
Daikirin	1958-5	1974-11	Ōzeki	Nishonoseki	sumo elder until June 2006
Hanahikari	1958-5	1970-9	Maegashira 3	Hanakago	jūryō champion, former elder in the JSA 1970–1975
Katsuhikari	1958-9	1973-3	Maegashira 1	Araiso; Isegahama	jūryō champion, former head coach at Isegahama stable
Tochiōyama	1958-11	1972-1	Maegashira 1	Kasugano	jūryō champion
Kotozakura	1959-1	1974-7	Yokozuna	Sadogatake	was head of Sadogatake stable during a very successful period
Tamanoumi	1959-3	1971-9	Yokozuna	Kataonami	died during surgery while an active yokozuna
Asaarashi	1959-3	1973-3	Maegashira 12	Takasago	former elder in the JSA under the name Furiwake
Yoshinohana	1959-5	1973-7	Maegashira 1	Dewanoumi	two-time jūryō champion, former elder in the JSA
Shiratayama	1959-7	1977-7	Maegashira 4	Takasago	jūryō champion, former elder in the JSA
Tokibayama	1959-9	1975-3	Maegashira 2	Tokitsukaze	two-time jūryō champion, died while active as an elder in the JSA
Hasegawa	1960-3	1976-5	Sekiwake	Sadogatake	unusually, kept his family name as his ring name, former director of the Nagoya tournament for the JSA
Arashiyama	1960-3	1972-5	Maegashira 12	Miyagino	jūryō champion
Toyokuni Susumu	1960-5	1968-1	Komusubi	Tokitsukaze	won seven gold stars
Futagoryū	1960-9	1971-3	Maegashira 5	Hanakago; Futagoyama	jūryō champion
Wakafutase	1960-9	1975-3	Komusubi	Onaruto; Asahiyama	two-time jūryō champion, former head coach of Asahiyama stable
Tochiazuma I	1960-11	1977-1	Sekiwake	Kasugano	won ten special prizes, father of Ōzeki Tochiazuma
Dairyugawa	1961-1	1979-5	Maegashira 1	Mihogaseki	former elder in the JSA under the name Kiyomigata
Futagodake	1961-1	1976-9	Komusubi	Hanakago; Futagoyama	founder of Araiso stable
Maenoyama	1961-3	1974-3	Ōzeki	Takasago	Korean descent, broke his stable off from Ichimon to become independent
Yutakayama	1961-3	1968-9	Ōzeki	Tokitsukaze	runner-up for top division championship 8 times, former head of Tokitsukaze stable and JSA
Fujinokawa	1961-5	1972-11	Sekiwake	Isenoumi	former head of Isenoumi stable and director of the JSA
Wakanoumi II	1961-5	1978-1	Maegashira 2	Hanakago	jūryō champion, active as an elder in the JSA for 14 years
Tochifuji	1961-5	1974-9	Maegashira 3	Kasugano	two-time jūryō champion
Haguroiwa	1961-5	1978-1	Komusubi	Tatsunami	former elder in the JSA under the name Ikazuchi
Mutsuarashi	1961-9	1976-3	Sekiwake	Miyagino	two-time jūryō champion, won five special prizes
Ōshio	1962-1	1988-1	Komusubi	Tokitsukaze	all-time record for most bouts ever fought
Maruyama	1962-5	1976-9	Maegashira 13	Tokitsukaze	jūryō champion
Fujizakura	1963-3	1985-3	Sekiwake	Takasago	former holder of the record for most consecutive professional bouts, now head of Nakamura stable
Tochiisami	1963-3	1979-11	Maegashira 7	Kasugano	jūryō champion, active as an elder in the JSA under the name Iwatomo
Asahikuni	1963-7	1979-9	Ōzeki	Tatsunami	won 6 technique prizes, broke off to form own stable, Ōshima stable
Mienoumi	1963-7	1980-11	Yokozuna	Dewanoumi	took an all-time record 97 tournaments to reach yokozuna
Asanobori	1963-7	1978-5	Maegashira 2	Asahiyama	four-time jūryō champion, former elder in the JSA
Futatsuryū	1963-9	1982-11	Komusubi	Tokitsukaze	former Tokitsukaze stable head, stripped of position and arrested over hazing death scandal
Tenryū	1963-12	1976-9	Maegashira 1	Nishonoseki	after a dispute with the JSA, went on to be a pro wrestler
Takamiyama	1964-3	1984-5	Sekiwake	Takasago	first foreigner to win top division championship, holds many longevity records, held the gold star record until Akinoshima
Aobajō	1964-3	1986-7	Sekiwake	Oshiogawa	holds record for most consecutive career bouts
Kurohimeyama	1964-3	1982-1	Sekiwake	Tatsunami	won eight special prizes and six gold stars
Tamakiyama	1964-5	1984-3	Komusubi	Kataonami	not to be confused with the Hawaiian born Takamiyama
Kongō	1964-5	1976-9	Sekiwake	Nishonoseki	now head of Nishonoseki stable
Wakajishi	1964-5	1983-5	Komusubi	Futagoyama	jūryō champion, former elder in the JSA
Teruzakura	1964-5	1976-1	Maegashira 7	Isegahama	active as an elder in the JSA under the name Urakaze
Kitaseumi	1964-7	1979-5	Sekiwake	Dewanoumi; Kokonoe	jūryō champion, active as an elder in the JSA under the name Kimigahama
Yoshioyama	1965-3	1976-1	Maegashira 2	Mihogaseki	jūryō champion
Daiju	1965-3	1977-5	Ōzeki	Takashima	briefly held ōzeki rank, then head of Asahiyama stable
Taiga	1965-3	1977-5	Maegashira 1	Kimigahama	two-time jūryō champion
Takanohana I	1965-5	1981-1	Ōzeki	Futagoyama	held ōzeki rank for then record 50 tournaments, father of Yokozuna Takanohana II and Wakanohana III
Yoshinotani	1965-5	1982-5	Maegashira 4	Dewanoumi	jūryō champion, died as an active oyakata
Kaiki	1965-9	1987-3	Sekiwake	Tomozuna	Now head of Tomozuna stable and on board of JSA
Kurosegawa	1966-1	1984-5	Komusubi	Isegahama	jūryō champion, active as an elder in the JSA under the name Kiriyama
Chiyozakura	1966-3	1978-5	Maegashira 5	Dewanoumi; Kokonoe	two-time jūryō champion
Daigō	1966-5	1982-3	Maegashira 11	Hanakago	jūryō champion, former elder in the JSA
Kaiketsu	1966-9	1979-1	Ōzeki	Hanakago	two-time ōzeki, head of JSA from 2010-12 during the match-fixing scandal
Banryūyama	1966-11	1984-11	Komusubi	Mihogaseki	persevered most of his career in the unsalaried ranks
Kitanoumi	1967-1	1985-1	Yokozuna	Mihogaseki	youngest yokozuna ever, won 24 tournament titles, former head of Kitanoumi stable
Masuiyama II	1967-1	1981-3	Ōzeki	Mihogaseki	at 31, oldest wrestler promoted to ōzeki until Kotomitsuki in modern era
Washūyama	1967-3	1985-11	Sekiwake	Dewanoumi	small wrestler, popular with tournament crowds, now head of Dewanoumi stable
Kirinji	1967-5	1988-9	Sekiwake	Nishonoseki	fought 84 top division tournaments, won a gold star at age 35
Tamanofuji	1967-5	1981-11	Sekiwake	Kataonami	became head of Kataonami stable
Kotonofuji	1967-5	1982-1	Maegashira 5	Sadogatake	jūryō champion, former elder in the JSA
Kotogatake	1967-11	1984-3	Maegashira 1	Sadogatake	jūryō champion, former elder in the JSA
Daihi	1968-3	1983-5	Maegashira 2	Oyama	briefly head coach of Oyama stable before it was shut down in 1986, since 2011 a coach at Azumazeki stable
Ōnishiki	1968-5	1988-1	Komusubi	Dewanoumi	Twenty-year career, now an elder in the JSA
Takanosato	1968-7	1986-1	Yokozuna	Futagoyama	late bloomer who became yokozuna at nearly 31 years old, founded Naruto stable
Wakanohana II	1968-7	1983-1	Yokozuna	Futagoyama	now head of Magaki stable
Hachiya	1968–9	1987–9	Maegashira 6	Kasugano	lightweight who spent a record 55 tournaments in juryo
Kurama	1968-9	1989-9	Sekiwake	Tokitsukaze	had 21-year career, died young of leukemia
Taikō	1968-11	1980-11	Maegashira 8	Futagoyama	two-time jūryō champion
Aobayama	1968-11	1982-9	Komusubi	Kise	jūryō champion, died as an active elder in the JSA under the name Asakayama
Hidanohana	1969-3	1989-3	Maegashira 1	Futagoyama	jūryō champion, former elder in the JSA 1989–1994
Kaneshiro	1969-9	1987-5	Sekiwake	Kasugano	won three special prizes for fighting spirit
Wajima	1970-1	1981-3	Yokozuna	Hanakago	only former collegiate sumo wrestler promoted to yokozuna, or to keep his family name as his ring name, later became a pro wrestler
Tamaryū	1970-3	1992-1	Komusubi	Kataonami	very long career, spent 11 years in the lower ranks
Yutakayama	1970-3	1981-5	Komusubi	Tokitsukaze	former college champion, now head of Minato stable
Hoshiiwato	1970-5	1991-1	Maegashira 14	Izutsu; Michinoku	former head coach of Michinoku stable
Chiyonofuji	1970-9	1991-5	Yokozuna	Kokonoe	tournament wins third only to Hakuhō Shō and Taihō, won more championships than any other yokozuna in his thirties, continued to triumph though older and lighter than most opponents, holds record for most top division bouts won, and most bouts won overall
Zaōnishiki	1970-9	1983-1	Maegashira 1	Isenoumi; Kagamiyama	jūryō champion, now a coach at Tokitsukaze stable under the name Nishikijima
Yamaguchi	1971-1	1982-11	Maegashira 4	Hanakago; Hanaregoma	jūryō champion
Shishihō	1971-1	1987-5	Maegashira 2	Nishonoseki; Taihō	three-time jūryō champion
Misugiiso	1971-3	1986-9	Maegashira 2	Hanakago; Hanaregoma	jūryō champion, active as an elder in the JSA under the name Minezaki
Ōzutsu	1971-5	1992-5	Sekiwake	Taiho	fought second-most consecutive bouts in top division history, earned ten gold stars
Daitetsu	1971-7	1990-9	Komusubi	Nishonoseki	currently a coach at Nishonoseki stable, under the elder name Minatogawa
Kotokaze	1971-7	1985-11	Ōzeki	Sadogatake	set up own somewhat successful stable, Oguruma, often a commentator on sumo for NHK
Kotochitose	1971-7	1986-7	Maegashira 5	Sadogatake	two-time jūryō champion
Konuma	1971-7	1978-11	Maegashira 9	Kagamiyama	jūryō champion, promising career ruined by broken leg
Takarakuni	1971-7	1986-9	Maegashira 2	Isegahama; Kiriyama	jūryō champion
Hō'ō	1971-9	1990-5	Sekiwake	Nishonoseki	four-time jūryō champion
Iwashita	1971-11	1984-3	Maegashira 8	Tatsunami	jūryō champion
Arase	1972-1	1981-9	Sekiwake	Hanakago	former college champion, became TV personality after retirement
Sadanoumi	1972-3	1988-7	Komusubi	Dewanoumi	won five special prizes, former elder in the JSA under the name Tagonoura
Tochiakagi	1973-1	1990-3	Sekiwake	Kasugano	jūryō champion, won eight special prizes and eight gold stars
Chikubayama	1973-3	1989-1	Maegashira 13	Miyagino	now Hakuhō's coach at Miyagino stable
Koboyama	1973-3	1990-11	Sekiwake	Takashima, Kumagatani	after retirement re-established his old stable
Ōyutaka	1974-1	1987-1	Komusubi	Tokitsukaze	spent 9 years in unsalaried ranks, founded Arashio stable in 2002
Tagaryū	1974-3	1991-5	Sekiwake	Kagamiyama	once won a top division championship while a low ranked maegashira facing demotion, has exactly one championship in the top four of six divisions
Ōnohana	1974-3	1990-9	Maegashira 13	Taihō	two-time jūryō champion, former elder in the JSA
Tōryū	1974-3	1990-1	Sekiwake	Mihogaseki	won two gold stars against Wakanohana II
Dewanohana II	1974-3	1988-1	Sekiwake	Dewanoumi	jūryō champion, won ten special prizes, elder in the JSA under the name Dekiyama
Masudayama	1974-3	1989-7	Sekiwake	Kasugano	jūryō champion, active as an elder in the JSA under the name Chiganoura
Takanomine	1974-9	1991-5	Maegashira 12	Kimigahama; Izutsu	took him 88 tournaments to reach the makuuchi division
Tochiizumi	1975-1	1990-3	Jūryō 3	Kasugano	jūryō champion
Tochimatoi	1975-1	1989-3	Maegashira 11	Kasugano	jūryō champion
Kirishima	1975-3	1996-3	Ōzeki	Izutsu	took 91 tournaments for promotion to ōzeki, an all-time record
Ōnoumi	1975-3	1977-7	Maegashira 4	Hanakago	retired to become a pro wrestler
Daijuyama	1975-3	1991-5	Sekiwake	Futagoyama	won three Fighting Spirit prizes, now head coach of the Hanakago stable
Wakashimazu	1975-3	1987-7	Ōzeki	Futagoyama	started sumo after high school, which is unusually late; nicknamed "Black Panther" by fans for his good looks and lean figure
Sasshūnada	1976-1	1988-3	Maegashira 1	Kimigahama; Izutsu	jūryō champion, now a coach at Michinoku stable under the name Tatsutayama
Hokuten'yū	1976-3	1990-9	Ōzeki	Mihogaseki	one of the longest serving ōzeki, had storied rivalry with Chiyonfuji; his stable was folded into Kitanoumi stable upon his death
Hananoumi	1976-3	1989-3	Komusubi	Hanaregoma	Injury prone but briefly a nemesis of Chiyonofuji in the late 1980s
Ishinriki	1976-3	1990-7	Jūryō 1	Onaruto	One of the smallest ever sekitori, later went into pro wrestling
Takamisugi	1976-3	1995-11	Komusubi	Futagoyama	Had record 71 tournaments in top division without winning a special prize
Kototsubaki	1976-3	1995-3	Maegashira 3	Sadogatake	elder in the JSA under the name Shiratama
Amanoyama	1976-3	1986-11	Maegashira 1	Tokitsukaze	Died while active as Tatsutayama-oyakata in 1997
Fujinoshin	1976-3	1990-9	Maegashira 1	Izutsu; Kokonoe	active as an elder in the JSA under the name Jinmaku
Dairyū	1976-5	1997-7	Jūryō 4	Taihō	became head coach of Ōtake stable after Takatōriki was fired by the JSA in July 2010
Maenoshin	1977-3	1990-3	Komusubi	Takadagawa	became an elder after retirement but was fired in 1997
Kinoarashi	1977-3	1991-9	Maegashira 2	Oshiogawa	jūryō champion
Enazakura	1977-3	1994-7	Maegashira 1	Oshiogawa	jūryō champion, former elder in the JSA
Jingaku	1977-5	1991-9	Komusubi	Izutsu	career restricted by nerves on the dohyo, scored only 2-13 and 3-12 in two attempts at komusubi rank
Sakahoko	1978-1	1992-9	Sekiwake	Izutsu	served in top division at the same time as his brother Terao, a very rare occurrence; record for longest serving sekiwake
Asashio IV	1978-3	1989-3	Ōzeki	Takasago	director of JSA until February 2008
Kotoinazuma	1978-3	1999-7	Komusubi	Sadogatake	now coach at the very successful Sadogatake stable
Mitoizumi	1978-3	2000-9	Sekiwake	Takasago	fan favorite known for throwing a huge handful of salt in pre-bout ritual, retired at the late age of 38
Ōnokuni	1978-3	1991-7	Yokozuna	Hanakago; Hanaregoma	often plagued by injury, also suffered from sleep apnea, published an autobiography in 2008
Wakasegawa	1978-3	1992-7	Maegashira 1	Isegahama	three-time jūryō champion
Kirinishiki	1978-3	1995-11	Maegashira 2	Kagamiyama	won three gold stars, active as an elder in the JSA under the name Katsunoura
Itai	1978-9	1991-9	Komusubi	Onaruto	had the longest winning streak from entry into pro sumo until record broken by Jōkōryū more than 30 years later, after retirement made allegations of match-fixing
Misugisato	1979-1	1998-7	Komusubi	Futagoyama	promoted to komusubi without ever facing any san'yaku wrestlers
Futahaguro	1979-3	1987-12	Yokozuna	Tatsunami	only yokozuna to have never won a top division championship
Hokutoumi	1979-3	1992-5	Yokozuna	Kokonoe	once one of four yokozuna, after his retirement the rank was vacant for 8 months until Akebono
Kotogaume	1979-3	1997-3	Sekiwake	Sadogatake	last to defeat Chiyonofuji before his 53-win streak
Masurao	1979-3	1990-7	Sekiwake	Oshiogawa	had a record 5 jūryō championships
Takanofuji	1979-3	1992-5	Komusubi	Kokonoe	stablemate of Chiyonofuji and Hokutoumi, now a professional wrestler
Terao	1979-7	2002-11	Sekiwake	Izutsu	has a long sumo pedigree, holds a number of longevity records
Tamakirin	1980-1	1987-7	Jūryō 6	Oshiogawa	quit to become a professional wrestler
Kotofuji	1980-3	1995-9	Sekiwake	Sadogatake	won a tournament championship from the maegashira ranks
Hidenohana	1980-3	1994-3	Jūryō 5	Hanakago; Hanaregoma	former jūryō champion, but never reached the makuuchi division
Kyokudōzan	1980-5	1996-11	Komusubi	Ōshima	known for light weight, later became a politician
Asahifuji	1981-1	1992-1	Yokozuna	Ōshima	his Isegahama has produced the very successful rikishi Harumafuji and Aminishiki
Kasugafuji	1981-3	1996-9	Maegashira 1	Kasugayama	re-established Kasugayama stable, forced to resign from Japan Sumo Association after expenses scandal
Kotobeppu	1981-3	1997-11	Maegashira 1	Sadogatake	ring name comes from the famous hot spring resort city of Beppu, where he was born
Tochitsukasa	1981-3	1992-5	Sekiwake	Kasugano	now head of Irumagawa stable
Daizen	1981-3	2002-3	Komusubi	Nishonoseki	Twenty-two-year career, ranked in makuuchi at age 37
Toyonoumi	1981-3	1999-3	Maegashira 1	Futagoyama; Fujishima; Futagoyama	two-time jūryō champion, former elder in the JSA
Asahisato	1981-3	1998-1	Maegashira 14	Ōshima	spent the majority of his career in the jūryō division, took over former Kasugayama stable
Kitakachidoki	1981-5	2000-9	Maegashira 3	Isenoumi	steady if unspectacular makuuchi career, now head of Isenoumi stable
Wakashoyo	1981-5	1997-11	Sekiwake	Futagoyama	now a mixed martial artist
Akinoshima	1982-3	2003-5	Sekiwake	Futagoyama	all-time gold stars record holder, 25% more than closest rival
Tamakairiki	1982-5	1996-3	Maegashira 8	Kataonami	later became a professional wrestler
Konishiki	1982-7	1997-11	Ōzeki	Takasago	at 265 kilos, the heaviest wrestler ever, first foreign ōzeki, now a widely popular celebrity
Takatōriki	1983-3	2002-9	Sekiwake	Futagoyama	record for most fighting spirit prizes, most gold stars against one opponent, Akebono; won his only top division championship while just above the demotion line
Hattori	1983-3	1987-7	Maegashira 3	Isenoumi	entered professional sumo as a makushita tsukedashi
Daigaku	1983-3	1993-9	Jūryō 2	Tokitsukaze	jūryō champion
Ryūkōzan	1983-3	1990-3	Maegashira 5	Dewanoumi	jūryō champion, died of heart attack whilst active
Oginohana	1983-7	1998-7	Maegashira 2	Dewanoumi	now head of Dewanoumi stable
Ichinoya	1983-11	2007-11	Sandanme 6	Takasago	studied physics at university, retired at 46
Komafudō	1984-1	1985-11	Maegashira 13	Hanakago; Hanaregoma	jūryō champion
Kotonishiki	1984-3	2000-9	Sekiwake	Sadogatake	only wrestler ever to win two championships at maegashira
Kyokugōzan	1984-3	1996-9	Maegashira 9	Ōshima	jūryō champion
Daishi	1984-3	2002-3	Maegashira 3	Oshiogawa	had to leave the JSA in June 2003 when he couldn't acquire a permanent elder name
Minatofuji	1984-3	2002-9	Maegashira 2	Minato	jūryō champion, head coach of Mintao stable
Kotonowaka	1984-5	2005-11	Sekiwake	Sadogatake	known for his countering techniques, and especially long bouts
Naminohana	1984-5	1997-3	Komusubi	Futagoyama	part of huge sekitori contingent at Futagoyama stable in the mid 1990s
Nankairyu	1984-9	1988-11	Maegashira 2	Takasago	3rd foreign wrestler to reach the top division, career short and troubled
Akinoshū	1984-9	2001-1	Maegashira 9	Izutsu	jūryō champion
Kenkō	1984-11	1998-3	Komusubi	Takadagawa	career ended early by extremely rare form of leukemia
Ryōgoku	1985-3	1993-1	Komusubi	Dewanoumi	currently head of one of the strongest stables, Sakaigawa
Tochinowaka	1985-3	1999-7	Sekiwake	Kasugano	current head of Kasugano stable
Tatsuhikari	1985-3	1999-3	Maegashira 6	Tatsunami	two-time jūryō champion
Tokitsunada	1985-3	1999-9	Maegashira 4	Tokitsukaze	two-time jūryō champion
Aogiyama	1985-3	2003-11	Maegashira 1	Tokitsukaze	two-time jūryō champion, elder in the JSA under the name Edagawa
Kanechika	1985-9	2004-9	Jūryō 2	Mihogaseki; Kitanoumi	elder in the JSA under the name Kumagatani
Kototenzan	1985-11	1986-7	Makushita 43	Sadogatake	Canadian-born, retired undefeated at 21 wins due to inability to adjust to sumo life; renown pro wrestler "Earthquake" for the WWE
Ganyū	1986-3	2000-5	Maegashira 1	Kitanoumi	active as an elder in the JSA under the name Yamahibiki
Hanakaze	1986-3	2021-1	Sandanme 18	Tatsunami	longest career in history of sumo, aged 51 at retirement
Tomoefuji	1986-5	1998-9	Komusubi	Kokonoe	former performer of the yumitori-shiki ceremony, fell to what at the time was lowest rank held by former san'yaku wrestler
Asahiyutaka	1987-3	1999-1	Komusubi	Ōshima	now head coach of Tatsunami stable
Kitazakura	1987-3	2010-3	Maegashira 9	Kitanoumi	brother of Toyozakura, took 86 tournaments to reach top division, popular with sumo audiences
Kotoryū	1987-3	2005-5	Maegashira 1	Sadogatake	one of many top wrestlers at Sadogatake stable in the 1990s
Oginishiki	1987-3	2004-1	Komusubi	Dewanoumi	his father and brother were also sumo wrestlers
Takanonami	1987-3	2004-5	Ōzeki	Futagoyama	had longest single wrestler rivalry in history with Musashimaru, often appears on television due to accessible personality
Takamishu	1987-3	1989-7	Makushita 2	Azumazeki	Early star from Azumazeki stable before being overshadowed by stablemate Akebono. Actor with recurring role in Hawaii Five-0
Hoshitango	1987-5	2004-1	Jūryō 3	Michinoku	first Jew in sumo, now a professional wrestler
Kushimaumi	1988-1	1998-11	Maegashira 1	Dewanoumi	highly successful amateur, head of Tagonoura stable until death due to heart disease at 46
Akebono	1988-3	2001-1	Yokozuna	Azumazeki	first foreign yokozuna, later became a pro wrestler
Kaiō	1988-3	2011-7	Ōzeki	Tomozuna	five-time yusho winner, holds records for most tournaments and most wins in top division
Takanohana II	1988-3	2003-1	Yokozuna	Futagoyama	long sumo pedigree, set many youth related records, won 22 tournaments
Wakanohana III	1988-3	2000-3	Yokozuna	Futagoyama	brother of Takanohana II, never won a tournament as yokozuna, now operates a chain of chankonabe restaurants
Wakanoyama	1988-3	2005-9	Komusubi	Musashigawa	after demotion out of top division, fought his way back up after a record long 28 tournaments
Rikio	1988-3	1997-9	Maegashira 4	Naruto	now a pro wrestler
Sentōryū	1988-7	2003-11	Maegashira 12	Tomozuna	from St. Louis Missouri, only top division wrestler ever from mainland USA
Shikishima	1989-1	2001-5	Maegashira 1	Tatsutagawa; Michinoku	jūryō champion, currently using Aminishiki's Ajigawa kabu
Kōbō	1989-3	2008-1	Maegashira 9	Miyagino	top wrestler at Miyagino stable before the emergence of Hakuho
Toyozakura	1989-3	2011-5	Maegashira 5	Michinoku	brother of Kitazakura, forced to retire in match-fixing scandal
Hidenokuni	1989-9	1990-5	Jonidan 89	Azumazeki	first and only wrestler from the UK, short career
Daishōyama	1989-9	1995-11	Maegashira 2	Tatsunami	former amateur champion, retired due to hip injury, currently head coach of Oitekaze stable
Musashimaru	1989-9	2003-11	Yokozuna	Musashigawa	born in Samoa and raised in Hawaii; second foreign yokozuna; injury free until near end of career
Gojōrō	1989-11	2005-11	Maegashira 3	Magaki	only rikishi to be disqualified twice in one tournament, had many injury problems
Daishōhō	1990-1	1999-7	Komusubi	Tatsunami	career ended early due to pancreatic cancer
Terunoumi	1990-3	1993-5	Maegashira 15	Musashigawa	jūryō champion
Mainoumi	1990-5	1999-11	Komusubi	Dewanoumi	very popular for small size and variety of techniques, now a popular TV personality and sumo announcer
Yamato	1990-11	1998-9	Maegashira 12	Magaki	after short career in sumo, started his own restaurant in Roppongi, Tokyo
Tōki	1991-1	2006-5	Komusubi	Takasago	known for distinctive sideburns, and later a bright orange mawashi, involved in an auto accident scandal
Chiyotenzan	1991-3	2008-1	Komusubi	Kokonoe	after quick rise to komusubi, eventually fell to the second-lowest rank ever held by a former san'yaku wrestler
Kasuganishiki	1991-3	2011-1	Maegashira 5	Kasugano	injury-plagued, widely accepted as a ring leader in 2011 match-fixing scandal
Kinkaiyama	1991-3	2006-5	Maegashira 6	Dewanoumi	three-time jūryō champion, now a coach at Dewanoumi stable under the name Tagonoura
Wakaazuma	1991-9	2003-5	Jūryō 13	Tamanoi	third brazilian to become a sekitori
Hamanoshima	1992-1	2004-5	Komusubi	Mihogaseki	now head of Onoe stable
Higonoumi	1992-1	2002-11	Maegashira 1	Mihogaseki	held maegashira rank for a then-record 53 consecutive tournaments, opened up Kise stable after retirement
Ohinode	1992-1	2000-9	Maegashira 9	Tatsunami	spent 21 tournaments as a sekitori
Wakanojō	1992-1	2004-5	Maegashira 6	Magaki	jūryō champion
Asanowaka	1992-3	2005-5	Maegashira 1	Wakamatsu; Takasago	the wrestler with the most wins in top division who never made san'yaku, popular with crowds for his ringside antics
Kyokushūzan	1992-3	2006-11	Komusubi	Ōshima	first of a group of Mongolian wrestlers to make the top division, had an all-time record 58 consecutive tournaments in the maegashira ranks
Kyokutenhō	1992-3	2015-7	Sekiwake	Ōshima, Tomozuna	three-time sekiwake, was last remaining member of first wave of Mongolians to enter sumo, oldest top division championship holder in the history of modern sumo, holds the record for the most top division bouts of all time
Kyokutenzan	1992-3	2007-11	Makushita 13	Ōshima	achieved only minor success, suspected of being involved in match-fixing
Shunketsu	1992-3	2008-3	Maegashira 12	Hanaregoma	lightweight wrestler, had several different ring names
Takanotsuru	1992-3	2006-5	Maegashira 8	Naruto	spent 10 years in the unsalaried ranks
Takanowaka	1992-3	2007-9	Sekiwake	Naruto	father was a pro baseball player
Tomonohana	1992-3	2001-11	Komusubi	Tatsunami	joined pro sumo at nearly 28 years of age
Harunoyama	1992-3	2006-11	Maegashira 10	Matsugane	former elder in the JSA
Asanosho	1992-3	2002-1	Maegashira 2	Wakamatsu	won a gold star against Akebono
Wakanosato	1992-3	2015-9	Sekiwake	Naruto	seventeen-time sekiwake, makuuchi regular who held record for most consecutive tournaments in junior sanyaku ranks
Daimanazuru	1992-5	2010-1	Maegashira 16	Asahiyama	spent 11 years in unsalaried ranks, one of few wrestlers from Nara prefecture
Ryūkō	1992-5	1999-1	Jūryō 8	Tamanoi	Brazilian-born, first foreigner to be awarded makushita tsukedashi status
Chiyotaikai	1992-11	2010-1	Ōzeki	Kokonoe	longest serving ōzeki in modern era, known for characteristic forward thrusting technique
Jūmonji	1992-11	2011-5	Maegashira 6	Michinoku	after a brief name change reverted to using own rare surname as his ring name, forced to retire in match-fixing scandal
Musōyama	1993-1	2004-11	Ōzeki	Musashigawa	former college champion and member of dominant Musashigawa stable, injury-prone
Tochisakae	1993-1	2008-1	Maegashira 1	Kasugano	also had many injury problems, now a coach at Kasugano stable
Hokutōriki	1993-3	2011-5	Sekiwake	Hakkaku	three-time tournament runner-up, ended Asashoryu's winning streak in 2004
Kotokasuga	1993-3	2011-5	Maegashira 7	Sadogatake	took 15 years to reach the top division, third-slowest ever, forced to retire in match-fixing scandal
Kyokunankai	1993-3	2011-5	Maegashira 16	Ōshima	took 17 years to reach the top division, second-slowest ever, forced to retire in match-fixing scandal
Ōga	1993-3	2007-5	Jūryō 6	Takasago	long serving performer of the yumitori-shiki (bow-twirling ceremony)
Ōtsukasa	1993-3	2009-3	Maegashira 4	Irumagawa	promoted to the top division on 11 different occasions
Ryūhō	1993-3	2012-5	Maegashira 16	Michinoku	spent 9 years in unsalaried ranks, sat out last year in sumo before finally retiring
Wakatoba	1993-3	2007-9	Maegashira 11	Oguruma	coached by former Daikirin, now has his elder name, Oshiogawa
Towanoyama	1993-11	2015-1	Maegashira 13	Dewanoumi	best-rank maegashira 13, yet through unlucky twist of fate never had a makuuchi bout
Asōfuji	1994-1	2011-5	Maegashira 13	Isegahama	very adept at throw techniques, brother of Aminishiki
Tamakasuga	1994-1	2008-9	Sekiwake	Kataonami	had the longest ever gap between sanshō awards at 55 tournaments, has an asteroid named after him
Tosanoumi	1994-3	2011-1	Sekiwake	Isenoumi	impressive special prize and gold star record, fought until age 38
Ushiomaru	1994-3	2009-5	Maegashira 10	Azumazeki	retired to take over as head coach of Azumazeki stable from former Takamiyama
Tochiazuma II	1994-11	2007-5	Ōzeki	Tamanoi	won 12 special prizes, seven for technique, first wrestler since Kiyokuni to win top division in ōzeki debut
Tochinohana	1995-3	2008-1	Komusubi	Kasugano	Won two special prizes in his debut top division tournament
Ōikari	1995-2	2004-11	Maegashira 11	Isenoumi	two-time jūryō champion, elder in the JSA under the name Kabutoyama
Wakatsutomu	1995-11	2006-7	Maegashira 12	Matsugane	one-time jūryō champion
Kaihō	1996-1	2010-7	Komusubi	Hakkaku	also an amateur champion, one of the lightest sekitori
Satonofuji	1996-1	2025-5	Makushita 55	Isegahama	noted for performing the yumitori-shiki (bow-twirling ceremony) 653 times, more than any other wrestler in sumo history
Tochinonada	1996-1	2012-1	Sekiwake	Kasugano	former sekiwake, tied for second on all-time kinboshi list
Yōtsukasa	1996-1	2005-11	Maegashira 11	Irumagawa	managed only two winning records in eight makuuchi appearances
Tokitsuumi	1996-3	2007-10	Maegashira 3	Tokitsukaze	former amateur, long time maegashira, retired to take over Tokitsukaze stable after former head removed over hazing death scandal
Dejima	1996-3	2009-7	Ōzeki	Musashigawa	ōzeki from 1999 to 2001, once had the most feared tachi-ai in sumo but suffered injury problems in later career
Aminishiki	1997-1	2019-7	Sekiwake	Isegahama	former sekiwake, all-time top ten for a number of sumo records, including most top division wins, most top division appearances and most tournaments ranked in the top division
Buyūzan	1997-3	2007-11	Maegashira 1	Musashigawa	former amateur champion, another top division wrestler from Musashigawa stable
Tamarikidō	1997-3	2010-1	Maegashira 8	Kataonami	lowest-ranking former top division wrestler ever to regain sekitori status
Hayateumi	1998-3	2006-1	Sekiwake	Oitekaze	former amateur champion, very promising career hampered and eventually ended by injury
Kaidō	1998-3	2006-9	Jūryō 4	Tomozuna	another former amateur but failed to make top division, stablemate of ozeki Kaiō
Kitataiki	1998-3	2018-1	Maegashira 2	Yamahibiki	best rank maegashira 2, held record for most consecutive bouts by an active wrestler at the end of his career
Tamaasuka	1998-3	2016-9	Maegashira 9	Kataonami	two-time jūryō winner, has been promoted to makuuchi 7 times
Tamanoshima	1998-3	2011-11	Sekiwake	Kataonami	was the only Fukushima prefecture native sekitori for a number of years
Miyabiyama	1998-7	2013-3	Ōzeki	Fujishima	promotion to ōzeki controversial, rose to top division so fast that he competed in his first top division tournaments with no top-knot, long-time makuuchi pusher thruster
Kasugaō	1998-11	2011-5	Maegashira 3	Kasugayama	only wrestler officially from Korean peninsula, forced to retired in match-fixing scandal
Asashōryū	1999-1	2010-1	Yokozuna	Takasago	sole yokozuna from 2004–07, 4th-most top division championships in history, life in and out of ring filled with controversy
Bushūyama	1999-1	2013-1	Maegashira 3	Fujishima	second-slowest progress to top division for any former collegiate champ
Tōōyama	1999-1	2007-9	Makushita 7	Tamanoi	jonokuchi champion, now works as actor, model and talent
Chiyohakuhō	1999-3	2011-5	Maegashira 6	Kokonoe	originally interested in judo, debuted the same tournament his former stablemate Chiyotaikai made Ōzeki, retired over match-fixing
Hamanishiki	1999-3	2012-3	Maegashira 11	Oitekaze	former maegashira 11, struggled in lower divisions, changed his ring name a number of times
Hananosato	1999-3	2010-5	Makushita 8	Takasago	former tsukebito of Asashoryu, once reached the cusp of sekitori but at 114 kg seemed to lack the requisite weight
Kirinowaka	1999-3	2011-5	Jūryō 4	Michinoku	was forced to retire due to his involvement in the 2011 match-fixing scandal
Kotomitsuki	1999-3	2010-7	Ōzeki	Sadogatake	holds record for most tournaments at sekiwake, oldest wrestler promoted to ōzeki in modern era, forced to retire due to illegal gambling
Takamisakari	1999-3	2013-1	Komusubi	Azumazeki	very popular with crowds for his energetic wrestling and spirited pre-bout ritual
Wakakirin	1999-3	2009-2	Maegashira 9	Oguruma	Protege of former ozeki Daikirin, dismissed for cannabis use
Wakakōyū	1999-3	2014-9	Komusubi	Onomatsu	best-rank komusubi, second wrestler from Onomatsu stable to reach top division after Katayama
Hakuba	2000-1	2011-5	Komusubi	Michinoku	fifty-tournament rise to top division is 2nd-longest after Sentoryu amongst foreign-born wrestlers, forced to retire in match-fixing scandal
Asasekiryū	2000-3	2017-5	Sekiwake	Takasago	two time sekiwake, father held equivalent of komusubi in Mongolian wrestling
Hōchiyama	2000-3	2014-1	Maegashira 14	Sakaigawa	after soaring through jūryō into top division, was soon demoted and struggled in lower divisions
Ōrora	2000–3	2018-9	Makushita 43	Yamahibiki	first Russian to join professional sumo, became heaviest sumo wrestler ever
Ryūō	2000-3	2013-7	Maegashira 8	Miyagino	specialized in pushing techniques which is a rarity among Mongolian wrestlers
Shimotori	2000-5	2011-5	Komusubi	Tokitsukaze	used own rare family name as his shikona, forced to retire in match-fixing scandal
Iwakiyama	2000-7	2010-9	Komusubi	Sakaigawa	former high school sumo coach, retired due to cerebral infarction complications
Kōryū	2000-11	2011-5	Maegashira 11	Hanakago	first top division wrestler produced by Hanakago stable since it was re-established in 1992, forced to retire in match-fixing scandal
Harumafuji	2001-1	2017-11	Yokozuna	Isegahama	Third Mongolian yokozuna, won nine tournament championships, retired after alleged assault on fellow wrestler Takanoiwa
Aotsurugi	2001-3	2009-5	Sandanme 1	Tagonoura	Originally from Tonga, acquired Japanese citizenship, missed a year through injury
Hakuhō	2001-3	2021-9	Yokozuna	Miyagino	holds the records for most top division championships, most career wins, and most wins in a calendar year at 86
Mōkonami	2001-3	2011-5	Maegashira 6	Tatsunami	first from Tatsunami stable to be ranked in makuuchi since 1999, forced to retire in match-fixing scandal
Shōtenrō	2001-3	2018-1	Maegashira 2	Fujishima	best rank maegashira 2, former junior wrestling champion at Mongolian Naadam festival
Kokkai	2001-5	2012-9	Komusubi	Oitekaze	former komusubi, first Caucasian wrestler to make top division, shikona came from Japanese name of the Black Sea of his home country
Daishochi	2001-7	2005-9	Makushita 15	Shibatayama	Mongolian now better known as amateur sumo champion
Kakizoe	2001-9	2012-5	Komusubi	Fujishima	used own rare surname as his shikona
Takanoyama	2001-11	2014-7	Maegashira 12	Tagonoura	only wrestler ever from the Czech Republic
Kakuryū	2001-11	2021-3	Yokozuna	Izutsu; Michinoku	fourth Mongolian yokozuna, six makuuchi championships
Toyonoshima	2002-1	2020-5	Sekiwake	Tokitsukaze	five-time runner-up, one of the shortest sekitori
Kotoshōgiku	2002-1	2020-11	Ōzeki	Sadogatake	In January 2016 he became the first Japanese-born wrestler in ten years to win a top-division tournament
Kisenosato	2002-3	2019-1	Yokozuna	Tagonoura	won two championships, in 2017 as first Japanese to be named yokozuna in almost 20 years he suffered a severe muscle tear winning his debut tournament and never fully recovered
Katayama	2002-3	2009-1	Maegashira 13	Onomatsu	did amateur sumo at university, used his given family name as his ring name
Hakurozan	2002-5	2008-9	Maegashira 2	Kitanoumi	along with older brother Rohō, became first foreign siblings to wrestle in top division at the same time, later dismissed due to cannabis use
Rohō	2002-5	2008-9	Komusubi	Ōtake	known for feisty nature, along with younger brother Hakurozan, was dismissed due to cannabis use
Amūru	2002-5	2018-5	Maegashira 5	Ōnomatsu	last Russian sekitori, injury-plagued career
Takekaze	2002-5	2019-1	Sekiwake	Oguruma	jūryō champion, the oldest sekiwake debutant since the end of World War II at the age of 35 years two months, and holds record for longest time from makuuchi debut to sekiwake at 64 basho
Tokitenkū	2002-7	2016-11	Komusubi	Tokitsukaze	two-time jūryō champ, won three consecutive championships from his debut
Kotoōshū	2002-11	2014-3	Ōzeki	Sadogatake	lost ōzeki status after 8 straight years at that rank, first European to win a top division championship, now founder and head coach of Naruto stable
Arawashi	2002-11	2020-1	Maegashira 2	Minezaki	took over 11 years to reach makuuchi, last survivor from Araiso stable
Futen'ō	2003-1	2011-5	Komusubi	Dewanoumi	collegiate sumo champ, sumo lover from very early age
Masatsukasa	2003-1	2011-5	Maegashira 8	Irumagawa	on promotion to sekitori ranks revealed to public he had a wife and son back home in Aomori Prefecture, forced to retire in match-fixing scandal
Sadanofuji	2003-3	2017-5	Maegashira 7	Sakaigawa	once released as Iwakiyama's tsukebito so he could concentrate on his wrestling
Kagamiō	2003-7	2023-3	Maegashira 9	Kagamiyama	Was first sekitori from his very small stable since the current coach Tagaryū was active in 1991, took jūryō championship after losing two playoffs in previous tournaments
Tokusegawa	2003-7	2011-5	Maegashira 4	Kiriyama	first wrestler from his stable to make top division, forced to retire in match-fixing scandal
Sōkokurai	2003-9	2020-3	Maegashira 2	Arashio	was expelled from sumo in 2011 due to alleged match-fixing but reinstated after winning a court case, became Arashio oyakata
Yoshikaze	2004-1	2019-9	Sekiwake	Oguruma	four-time sekiwake, college sumo champion, at one time held record for most makuuchi appearances without a san'yaku promotion
Hōmashō	2004-3	2015-1	Komusubi	Shikoroyama	three-time komusubi, first wrestler to make top division from former sekiwake Terao's stable
Kimurayama	2004-3	2014-1	Maegashira 7	Kasugano	one-time amateur champion, only sekitori from Wakayama prefecture for some time
Sagatsukasa	2004-3	2021-9	Maegashira 9	Irumagawa	High school yokozuna, one of the shortest recent sekitori
Satoyama	2004-3	2018-11	Maegashira 12	Onoe	known for using a wide variety of techniques, used own rare surname as his ring name
Baruto	2004-5	2013-9	Ōzeki	Onoe	Estonian, tied for 3rd-fastest rise to top division, second European to win a championship
Gōeidō	2005-1	2020-1	Ōzeki	Sakaigawa	held rank of sekiwake for a modern record 14 consecutive tournaments, one-time makuuchi champion
Tochiōzan	2005-1	2020-7	Sekiwake	Kasugano	longtime rival of Gōeidō
Toyohibiki	2005-1	2021-7	Maegashira 2	Sakaigawa	On rise to top division, suffered only one make-koshi. Once held active record for most makuuchi appearances without a san'yaku promotion
Okinoumi	2005-1	2023-1	Sekiwake	Hakkaku	one of the few top wrestlers from Shimane Prefecture, a three time runner-up
Asahishō	2005-3	2021-7	Maegashira 11	Tomozuna	Was one of wrestlers who briefly took up Mitoizumi's trademark salt-throwing routine
Daidō	2005-3	2016-1	Maegashira 8	Onomatsu	former amateur wrestler at Senshu University
Ikioi	2005-3	2021-7	Sekiwake	Isenoumi	had 1090 consecutive career matches
Wakanohō	2005-3	2008-8	Maegashira 1	Magaki	a fast-rising star, one of the most successful Russian wrestlers, first active wrestler to be dismissed by the Sumo Association (after arrest for cannabis possession)
Seirō	2005-7	2020-7	Maegashira 14	Shikoroyama	Mongolian wrestler first spotted by then-yokozuna Asashōryū in his younger years
Sakaizawa	2006-3	2011-5	Maegashira 15	Mihogaseki; Onoe	jūryō champion, was forced to retire due to his involvement in the 2011 match-fixing scandal
Shōhōzan	2006-3	2022-6	Komusubi	Matsugane; Nishonoseki; Hanaregoma	five-time komusubi, returned from two tournament suspension for baseball gambling in 2010 to become makushita mainstay
Tochinoshin	2006-3	2023-5	Ōzeki	Kasugano	former ōzeki, highest ranked Georgian and only one to win a makuuchi championship, won four consecutive lower-division championships while working way back up ranks after long injury absence
Chiyonokuni	2006-5	2023-7	Maegashira 1	Kokonoe	came back multiple times from injuries, two-time jūryō champion
Masunoyama	2006-7	2021-5	Maegashira 4	Chiganoura	first wrestler from his stable to make top division, but injuries and other health issues eventually led him to retire
Kaisei	2006-9	2022-9	Sekiwake	Tomozuna; Ōshima	first brazilian to reach makuuchi and sanyaku, now a coach at Ōshima stable under the name Tomozuna
Aran	2007-1	2013-9	Sekiwake	Mihogaseki	former sekiwake, one of a handful of Russian sekitori, shares the place record for fastest rise to top division, after Jōkōryū
Kiyoseumi	2007-1	2011-5	Maegashira 13	Kitanoumi	pro sumo debut at Makushita #10 was the highest Makushita tsukedashi ever, forced to retire in bout-fixing scandal
Tochinowaka	2007-1	2015-1	Maegashira 1	Kasugano	had Korean background but Japanese citizenship, used his stablemaster's old shikona
Yamamotoyama	2007-1	2011-5	Maegashira 9	Onoe	heaviest sumo recruit ever at time of recruitment, forced to retire in match-fixing scandal
Tenkaihō	2007-1	2019-3	Maegashira 8	Onoe	one of many Nihon University alumni from his stable
Asabenkei	2007-3	2024-7	Jūryō 7	Takasago	earned a sandanme division championship
Chiyoarashi	2007-3	2024-1	Jūryō 10	Kokonoe	returned to jūryō after eight and a half years
Kotoekō	2007-3	2024-5	Maegashira 4	Sadogatake	first top division wrestler from Miyazaki since Kaneshiro in 1985
Tosayutaka	2007-3	2016-1	Maegashira 1	Tokitsukaze	first wrestler from his stable to reach the top division after the Tokitsukaze stable hazing scandal, injury-plagued career
Chiyomaru	2007-5	2026-3	Maegashira 5	Kokonoe	jūryō champion, older brother of former komusubi Chiyoōtori
Kyokushūhō	2007-5	2022-1	Maegashira 4	Tomozuna	long time jūryō, joined stable of his idol, fellow countryman Kyokutenhō
Akiseyama	2008-1	2023-9	Maegashira 12	Kise	had close friendship with fellow amateur yokozuna Kiyoseumi
Homarefuji	2008-1	2019-9	Maegashira 6	Isegahama	from the same town as Mainoumi and the same high school as Masatsukasa
Kyokutaisei	2008-1	2024-12	Maegashira 8	Tomozuna	was the subject of a French documentary "Tu Seras Sumo", for nine months when first inducted into sumo
Kotoyūki	2008-3	2021-4	Sekiwake	Sadogatake	one-time sekiwake, jūryō champion, first Kagawa native to reach makuuchi since 1958
Chiyoōtori	2008-5	2021-11	Komusubi	Kokonoe	had one tournament at komusubi rank, younger brother of Chiyomaru
Azumaryū	2009-1	2024-1	Maegashira 11	Tamanoi	Mongolian, jūryō stalwart, former amateur at Kyushu Institute of Information Sciences
Kimikaze	2009-1	2014-5	Maegashira 13	Oguruma	jūryō champion
Takanoiwa	2009-1	2018-12	Maegashira 2	Takanohana; Chiganoura	jūryō champion; a year after his alleged assault by Harumafuji led to the Yokozuna's forced retirement, he himself allegedly assaulted one of his attendants and retired
Takarafuji	2009-1	2025-9	Sekiwake	Isegahama	one-time sekiwake, 990 consecutive top division bouts, 99 consecutive basho career total, former amateur at Kinki University
Tokushōryū	2009-1	2023-9	Maegashira 2	Kise	best rank maegashira 2, won an upset makuuchi championship from the last position in the top division rankings
Myōgiryū	2009-5	2024-9	Sekiwake	Sakaigawa	seven-time sekiwake, promising rise slowed due to injury in his jūryō debut
Aoiyama	2009-7	2024-9	Sekiwake	Kasugano	two-time sekiwake, second Bulgarian after Kotoōshū to enter makuuchi and to reach sekiwake
Terutsuyoshi	2010-3	2024-3	Maegashira 3	Isegahama	one-time runner-up and Fighting Spirit recipient
Jōkōryū	2011-5	2022-9	Komusubi	Kitanoumi; Kise	has the fastest rise to the top division in history, only taking him 9 tournaments. He also holds the record for most consecutive wins from entry into sumo
Chiyotairyū	2011-5	2022-11	Komusubi	Kokonoe	former amateur champion, reached the makuuchi division in one year
Terunofuji	2011-5	2025-1	Yokozuna	Isegahama	after reaching ōzeki, dropped four divisions due to health problems but fought back up to become 73rd yokozuna in 2021
Osunaarashi	2012-3	2018-3	Maegashira 1	Otake	first African sekitori, forced to retire after being involved in a traffic accident while driving without a license
Hidenoumi	2012-5	2026-3	Maegashira 6	Kise	faced stablemate Hamaguchi in lower division championship playoffs in two consecutive tournaments, a first in sumo history, suspended one tournament in 2022 for illegal gambling
Ishiura	2013-1	2023-6	Maegashira 5	Miyagino	third wrestler from Tottori Prefecture to reach top division since WWII, after retirement assumed the elder name Magaki and became coach at Miyagino stable
Ōnoshō	2013-1	2024-12	Komusubi	Ōnomatsu	two-time komusubi, only wrestler in makuuchi from once prominent Ōnomatsu
Daishōhō	2013-3	2026-2	Maegashira 9	Oitekaze	seven straight winning records in the jūryō division
Endō	2013-3	2025-11	Komusubi	Oitekaze	four-time komusubi, two-time amateur yokozuna, debuted at a high makushita 10, took championship in his jūryō debut
Takanofuji	2013-3	2019-10	Jūryō 5	Takanohana; Chiganoura	identical twin of Takagenji, forced to retire after his second instance of allegedly assaulting his attendants
Takagenji	2013-3	2021-7	Maegashira 10	Takanohana; Chiganoura	identical twin of Takanofuji, dismissed from sumo after admitting to smoking cannabis
Ichinojō	2014-1	2023-5	Sekiwake	Minato	second foreigner to be awarded makushita tsukedashi status, one-time makuuchi champion
Tsurugishō	2014-1	2026-4	Maegashira 6	Oitekaze	Nihon University graduate, jūryō champion
Daishōmaru	2014-3	2026-7	Maegashira 5	Oitekaze	former amateur yokozuna, followed previous year's amateur yokozuna, Endō into Oitekaze, makushita tsukedashi
Takakeishō	2014-9	2024-9	Ōzeki	Tokiwayama	best rank ōzeki. First recruited by former yokozuna Takanohana
Hokutofuji	2015-3	2025-5	Komusubi	Hakkaku	four-time komusubi, won seven kinboshi against four different Yokozuna
Chiyonoumi	2015-5	2024-7	Jūryō 12	Kokonoe	won three lower division championships in his first four tournaments
Shōnanzakura	2015-9	2021-9	Jonokuchi 9	Shikihide	better known as Hattorizakura, had a record 104 consecutive losses
Daiamami	2016-1	2026-1	Maegashira 11	Oitekaze	best rank maegashira 11, jūryō champion, makushita tsukedashi
Yutakayama	2016-3	2022-11	Maegashira 1	Tokitsukaze	former amateur, one of three at his stable who have used this shikona
Wakaichirō	2016-11	2020-2	Sandanme 32	Musashigawa	African-American-Japanese, short-lived and underwhelming career
Mitoryū	2017-5	2025-9	Maegashira 13	Nishikido	first foreigner to win the Amateur Yokozuna title, became highest ranking member of his stable upon joining it
Hokuseiho	2020-3	2024-2	Maegashira 6	Miyagino	extremely long reach which he utilized to get to the belt, won first 21 matches, stood at 204 cm (6 ft 8). Retired amidst assault allegations raised by his stablemates

== See also ==
- List of active sumo wrestlers
- List of heaviest sumo wrestlers
- List of non-Japanese sumo wrestlers
- List of sumo elders
- List of sumo record holders
- List of sumo tournament top-division champions
- List of sumo tournament second-division champions
- List of sumo stables
- List of yokozuna
- Glossary of sumo terms
