= Tamatsubaki Kentarō =

Japanese sumo wrestler

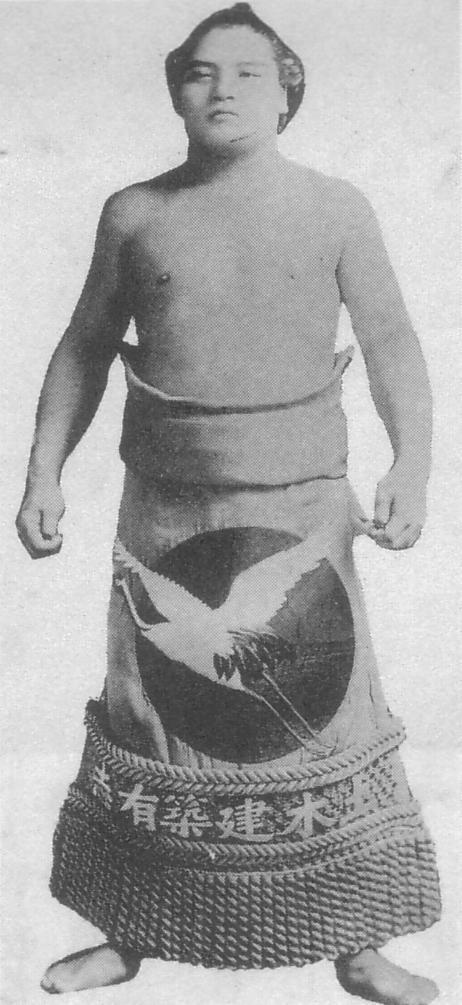

Personal information
- Native name: 玉椿憲太郎
- Born: Morino Kenjiro; 10 November 1883 Toyama, Toyama, Japan
- Died: 19 September 1928 (aged 44)
- Height: 1.58 m (5 ft 2 in)
- Weight: 73 kg (161 lb)

Sport
- Sport: Sumo
- Retired: January, 1916
- Heya: Ikazuchi
- Record: 91-82-52-34draws-17noresult
- Debut: January, 1897
- Highest rank: Sekiwake (June, 1909)
- Elder name: Shiratama
- Updated on June 2020

Tamatsubaki Kentarō (玉椿憲太郎, Tamatsubaki Kentarō; 10 November 1883 – 19 September 1928) was a sumo wrestler from Toyama City, Japan. He was known for his techniques, which accommodated his small size. Although his height was only 158 cm, he gave the likes of Hitachiyama and others a real challenge and was called the "mite". He was the shortest wrestler in sumo history, and also one of the lightest at 73 kg. His highest rank was sekiwake. After retirement, he was known as Shiratama-oyakata.

== Top division record ==
-	Spring	Summer
1903	x	East Maegashira #13; 4–3–1; 1d 1h
1904	East Maegashira #9; 6–3–1	East Maegashira #8; 0–0–10
1905	East Maegashira #11; 3–0–6; 1h	East Maegashira #4; 1–5–1; 1d 2h
1906	East Maegashira #8; 4–2–1; 3d	East Maegashira #2; 4–3–1; 1d 1h
1907	East Komusubi #1; 3–2–1; 5d	East Komusubi #1; 3–2–1; 3d 1h
1908	East Komusubi #1; 2–4–1; 2d 1h	East Maegashira #2; 5–3–2
1909	West Komusubi #1; 3–3–3; 1d	West Sekiwake #1; 1–8–1; 1d
1910	West Maegashira #1; 2–2; 3d 3h	West Maegashira #1; 4–3–1; 1d 2h
1911	West Sekiwake #1; 2–4–1; 2d 1h	West Maegashira #1; 5–3; 1d 1h
1912	West Sekiwake #1; 5–3; 2d	West Komusubi #1; 4–5; 1d
1913	West Komusubi #1; 5–2–1; 1d 1h	East Komusubi #1; 6–3; 1d
1914	East Sekiwake #1; 1–4–5	West Maegashira #2; 0–0–10
1915	West Maegashira #7; 3–6; 1d	East Maegashira #11; 3–4–3
1916	West Maegashira #13; Retired; 2–5–0; 2d 1h	x
Record given as win-loss-absent Top Division Champion Top Division Runner-up Retired Lower Divisions Key:d=Draw(s) (引分); h=Hold(s) (預り); Divisions: Makuuchi — Jūryō — Makushita — Sandanme — Jonidan — Jonokuchi Makuuchi ranks: Yokozuna — Ōzeki — Sekiwake — Komusubi — Maegashira

== See also ==
- Glossary of sumo terms
- List of past sumo wrestlers
