= Takanomine Akihiko =

Sumo wrestler

Personal information
- Native name: 貴ノ嶺 明彦
- Born: Akihiko Okazaki; 23 January 1959 (age 67) Mizumaki, Fukuoka, Japan
- Height: 1.84 m (6 ft 1/2 in)
- Weight: 102 kg (225 lb)

Sport
- Sport: Sumo
- Retired: May, 1991
- Heya: Kimigahama → Izutsu
- Record: 403-376-9
- Debut: September, 1974
- Highest rank: Maegashira 12 (March, 1989)
- Championships: 1 (Makushita)
- Updated on Sep. 2012

Takanomine Akihiko (born 23 January 1959 as Akihiko Okazaki) is a former sumo wrestler from Mizumaki, Fukuoka, Japan. He made his professional debut in September 1974 and reached the top division in May 1989. His highest rank was maegashira 12. He left the sumo world upon retirement from active competition in May 1991.

== Career record ==
Takanomine Akihiko
Year	January Hatsu basho, Tokyo	March Haru basho, Osaka	May Natsu basho, Tokyo	July Nagoya basho, Nagoya	September Aki basho, Tokyo	November Kyūshū basho, Fukuoka
1974	x	x	x	x	(Maezumo)	West Jonokuchi #16; 3–4
1975	West Jonokuchi #8; 4–3	East Jonidan #85; 3–4	West Jonidan #92; 3–4	East Jonidan #100; 5–2	West Jonidan #66; 4–3	West Jonidan #43; 4–3
1976	East Jonidan #25; 3–4	West Jonidan #39; 2–5	West Jonidan #59; 5–2	West Jonidan #18; 4–3	East Sandanme #88; 2–5	West Jonidan #21; 5–2
1977	West Sandanme #63; 2–5	East Jonidan #1; 4–3	West Sandanme #75; 5–2	West Sandanme #37; 2–5	East Sandanme #61; 5–2	East Sandanme #22; 1–4–2
1978	East Sandanme #52; Sat out due to injury 0–0–7	West Jonidan #7; 5–2	East Sandanme #59; 3–4	East Sandanme #71; 5–2	East Sandanme #44; 6–1	East Makushita #60; 2–5
1979	East Sandanme #24; 3–4	East Sandanme #41; 6–1	East Makushita #55; 5–2	West Makushita #35; 2–5	East Makushita #58; 4–3	East Makushita #47; 4–3
1980	West Makushita #37; 3–4	West Makushita #47; 3–4	West Sandanme #2; 3–4	West Sandanme #13; 5–2	East Makushita #49; 3–4	West Sandanme #2; 1–6
1981	West Sandanme #29; 6–1	East Makushita #50; 3–4	West Makushita #60; 4–3	East Makushita #46; 5–2	West Makushita #28; 2–5	East Makushita #45; 2–5
1982	West Sandanme #6; 5–2	West Makushita #42; 4–3	West Makushita #32; 3–4	East Makushita #47; 3–4	East Sandanme #5; 5–2	East Makushita #47; 4–3
1983	West Makushita #38; 3–4	East Makushita #51; 5–2	West Makushita #31; 2–5	East Makushita #55; 1–6	East Sandanme #30; 5–2	East Sandanme #4; 5–2
1984	East Makushita #43; 4–3	East Makushita #34; 5–2	East Makushita #18; 3–4	East Makushita #27; 4–3	East Makushita #19; 4–3	East Makushita #12; 2–5
1985	West Makushita #31; 5–2	East Makushita #16; 5–2	East Makushita #8; 4–3	East Makushita #5; 3–4	West Makushita #10; 2–5	West Makushita #25; 5–2
1986	West Makushita #12; 4–3	West Makushita #8; 2–5	East Makushita #24; 4–3	West Makushita #17; 3–4	West Makushita #27; 5–2	West Makushita #14; 4–3
1987	West Makushita #9; 4–3	West Makushita #6; 5–2	East Makushita #2; 2–5	East Makushita #17; 2–5	West Makushita #38; 3–4	East Makushita #49; 6–1
1988	East Makushita #25; 4–3	West Makushita #14; 5–2	West Makushita #5; 3–4	East Makushita #10; 7–0; Champion	West Jūryō #11; 8–7	West Jūryō #8; 10–5
1989	West Jūryō #1; 9–6	East Maegashira #12; 4–11	West Jūryō #4; 6–9	West Jūryō #9; 7–8	West Jūryō #10; 7–8	West Jūryō #12; 8–7
1990	West Jūryō #9; 8–7	East Jūryō #6; 5–10	East Jūryō #13; 5–10	West Makushita #6; 1–6	East Makushita #34; 3–4	East Makushita #43; 5–2
1991	East Makushita #25; 3–4	West Makushita #32; 3–4	East Makushita #42; Retired; 6–1	x	x	x
Record given as wins–losses–absences Top division champion Top division runner-up Retired Lower divisions Non-participation Sanshō key: F=Fighting spirit; O=Outstanding performance; T=Technique Also shown: ★=Kinboshi; P=Playoff(s); Divisions: Makuuchi — Jūryō — Makushita — Sandanme — Jonidan — Jonokuchi Makuuchi ranks: Yokozuna — Ōzeki — Sekiwake — Komusubi — Maegashira

== See also ==
- Glossary of sumo terms
- List of past sumo wrestlers
