= Futagoryū Isao =

Sumo wrestler

Futagoryu Isao
Personal information
- Native name: 二子竜 功
- Born: Isao Omura; 16 November 1941 (age 84) Aomori, Japan
- Height: 1.82 m (5 ft 11 1/2 in)
- Weight: 108 kg (238 lb)

Sport
- Sport: Sumo
- Retired: March, 1971
- Heya: Hanakago → Futagoyama
- Record: 307-278-0
- Debut: September, 1960
- Highest rank: Maegashira 5 (May, 1969)
- Championships: 1 (Jūryō)
- Updated on Sep. 2012

Futagoryu Isao (born 16 November 1941 as Isao Omura) is a former sumo wrestler from Aomori, Japan. He made his professional debut in September 1960 and reached the top division in January 1969. His highest rank was maegashira 5. He retired in March 1971.

== Career record ==
Futagoryu Isao
Year	January Hatsu basho, Tokyo	March Haru basho, Osaka	May Natsu basho, Tokyo	July Nagoya basho, Nagoya	September Aki basho, Tokyo	November Kyūshū basho, Fukuoka
1960	x	x	x	x	(Maezumo)	East Jonokuchi #22; 5–2
1961	West Jonidan #84; 4–3	West Jonidan #47; 3–4	West Jonidan #61; 3–4	West Jonidan #70; 3–4	East Jonidan #74; 6–1	West Sandanme #118; 6–1
1962	East Sandanme #59; 4–3	West Sandanme #42; 4–3	East Sandanme #34; 5–2	East Makushita #91; 2–5	West Sandanme #13; 4–3	West Sandanme #3; 3–4
1963	East Sandanme #13; 4–3	West Sandanme #1; 4–3	West Makushita #83; 6–1	East Makushita #52; 5–2	West Makushita #34; 4–3	West Makushita #27; 3–4
1964	East Makushita #36; 4–3	East Makushita #27; 3–4	East Makushita #30; 5–2	West Makushita #18; 4–3	East Makushita #14; 5–2	West Makushita #7; 3–4
1965	West Makushita #10; 3–4	West Makushita #13; 3–4	West Makushita #17; 3–4	West Makushita #20; 3–4	East Makushita #23; 4–3	West Makushita #19; 5–2
1966	East Makushita #11; 3–4	East Makushita #13; 4–3	West Makushita #11; 4–3	East Makushita #9; 4–3	East Makushita #8; 4–3	East Makushita #7; 1–6
1967	East Makushita #26; 3–4	West Makushita #29; 4–3	West Makushita #29; 6–1	East Makushita #8; 4–3	West Makushita #5; 4–3	East Makushita #3; 3–4
1968	West Makushita #6; 6–1	East Makushita #1; 4–3	West Jūryō #12; 9–6	East Jūryō #6; 9–6	West Jūryō #2; 7–8	West Jūryō #3; 12–3; Champion
1969	East Maegashira #11; 8–7	East Maegashira #9; 8–7	West Maegashira #5; 5–10	East Maegashira #10; 6–9	East Maegashira #13; 9–6	West Maegashira #5; 4–11
1970	East Jūryō #1; 6–9	East Jūryō #4; 7–8	East Jūryō #5; 5–10	West Jūryō #12; 8–7	West Jūryō #11; 9–6	East Jūryō #8; 6–9
1971	East Jūryō #12; 8–7	East Jūryō #11; Retired; 4–11	x	x	x	x
Record given as wins–losses–absences Top division champion Top division runner-up Retired Lower divisions Non-participation Sanshō key: F=Fighting spirit; O=Outstanding performance; T=Technique Also shown: ★=Kinboshi; P=Playoff(s); Divisions: Makuuchi — Jūryō — Makushita — Sandanme — Jonidan — Jonokuchi Makuuchi ranks: Yokozuna — Ōzeki — Sekiwake — Komusubi — Maegashira

== See also ==
- Glossary of sumo terms
- List of past sumo wrestlers
