= Ikazuchi stable =

Organization of sumo wrestlers

Coordinates: 35.8826°N 139.6114°E

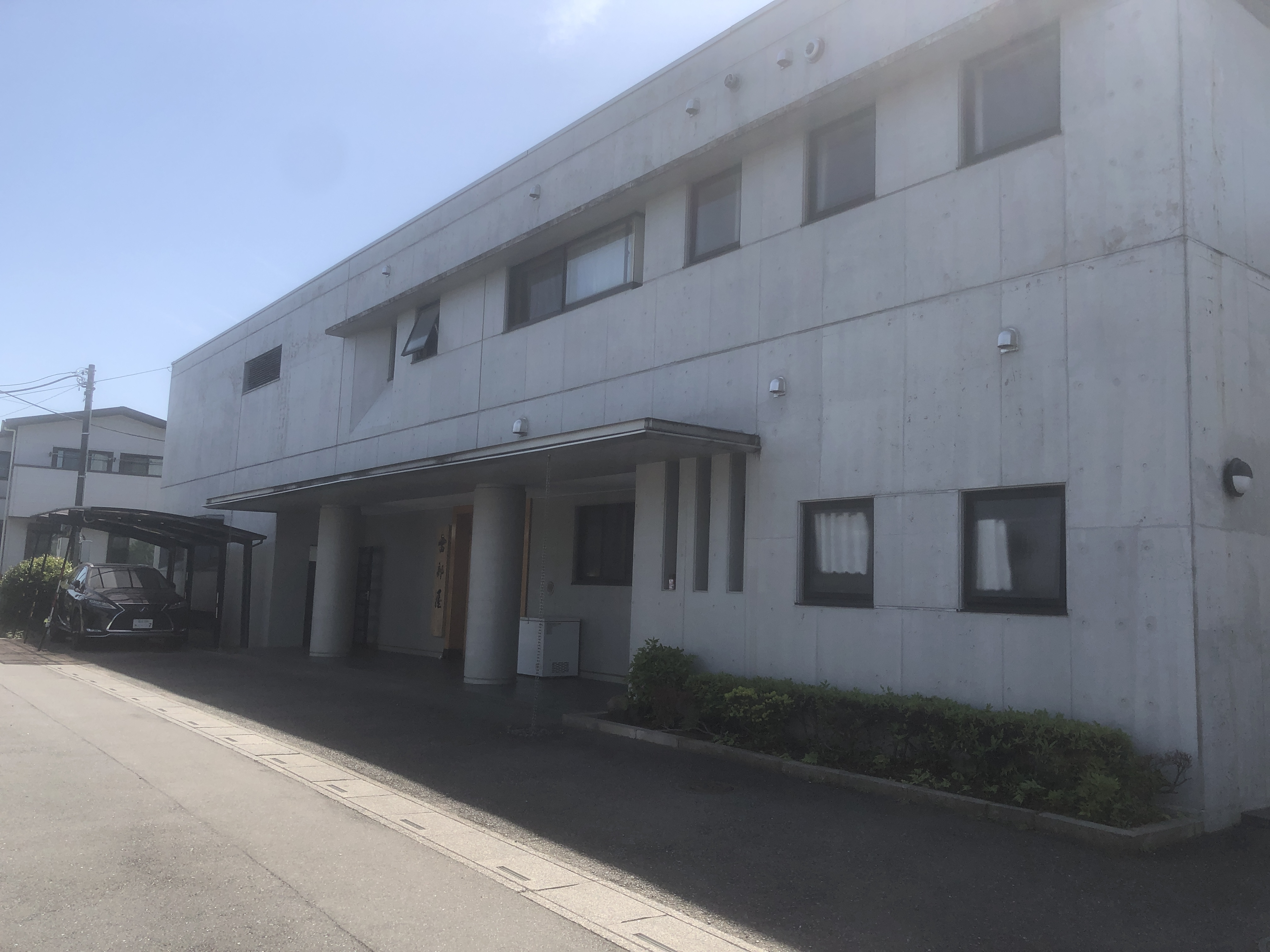

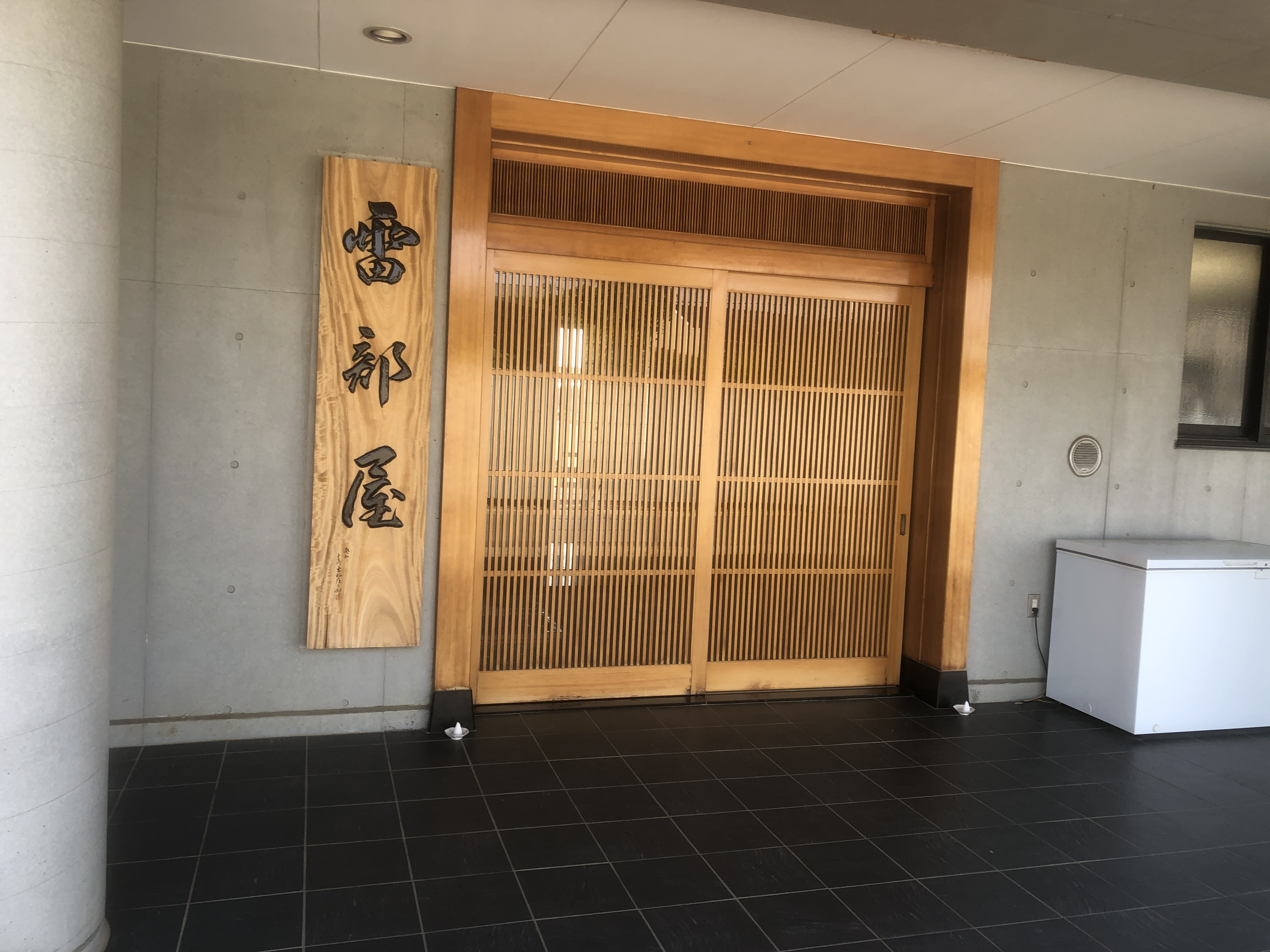

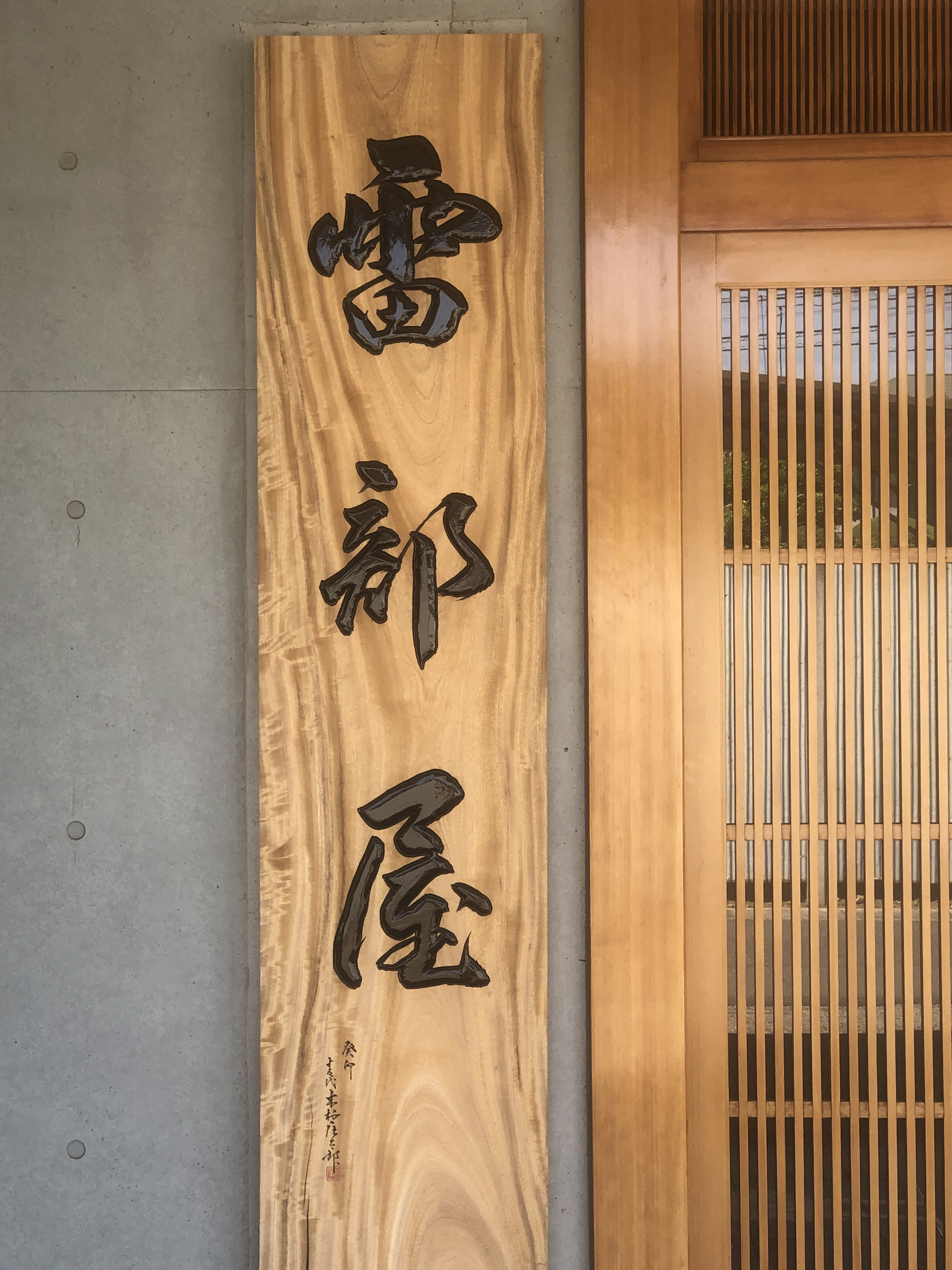

Ikazuchi stable (雷部屋, Ikazuchi-beya), formerly known as Irumagawa stable from 1993 to 2023, is a stable of sumo wrestlers, part of the Dewanoumi ichimon or group of stables. It was set up in January 1993 by former sekiwake Tochitsukasa, who branched off from Kasugano stable. The first sekitori produced by the stable was Oyamato (also known as Shirasaki) in January 1994. As of February 2023 it had seven wrestlers.

As of May 2026, the stable has 11 active wrestlers.

== History ==
On 26 January 2023 it was announced that Irumagawa, in anticipation of his mandatory retirement in April, would give control of his stable to coach Ikazuchi (komusubi Kakizoe) without him inheriting the Irumagawa elder name. The stable name change took effect six days later on 1 February, creating the first incarnation of the Ikazuchi stable in 62 years. In addition, the board meeting of the Japan Sumo Association approved the transfer of coach Wakafuji (Ōtsukasa) to Kise stable the following month.

In 2020, the stable recruited Ukrainian Serhii Sokolovskyi who made his debut during the March tournament under the name Shishi. This professional debut made Ukraine the 24th foreign country or territory to have a wrestler join professional sumo. In May 2023, Shishi reached sumo's second highest division, jūryō, hence being the only sekitori in his stable and the first Ukrainian to do so. Shishi became the present stable's first top-division wrestler upon his promotion to maegashira in November 2024.

In December 2024 stablemaster Ikazuchi announced that the stable would be moving from Saitama city to the Sumida ward building that was recently vacated by Ōshima stable. The move is planned to take place in February 2025.

== Ring name conventions ==
Many wrestlers at this stable take ring names or shikona that end with the character 司 (read: tsukasa), meaning boss, in deference to former coach and stable owner, the former Tochitsukasa.

== Owner ==
- 2023–present: 17th Ikazuchi Tōru (iin, komusubi Kakizoe, born 1978)
- 1993–2023: 16th Irumagawa Tetsuo (yakuin taigū iin, sekiwake Tochitsukasa, born 1958)

== Coach ==
- Irumagawa Tetsuo (san'yo, sekiwake Tochitsukasa, born 1958)

== Notable active wrestlers ==
- Shishi (best rank maegashira, born 1997)

== Notable former wrestlers ==
- Masatsukasa (maegashira 8, born 1984)
- Ōtsukasa (maegashira 4, born 1971)
- Sagatsukasa (maegashira 9, born 1981)
- Yōtsukasa (maegashira 11, 1973–2025)

== Referee ==
- Kimura Narimasa (sandanme gyoji, real name Narimasa Tajima, born 2002)

== Hairdresser ==
- Tokokuwa (second class tokoyama, born 1977)

== Location ==
Hachiouji 3-32-12, Saitama City, Saitama

== See also ==
- List of sumo stables
- List of active sumo wrestlers
- List of past sumo wrestlers
- Glossary of sumo terms
