= Daigō Kenshi =

Sumo wrestler

Personal information
- Native name: 大豪 健嗣
- Born: Noburu Itakura; 23 May 1952 (age 74) Yamamoto, Akita, Japan
- Height: 1.86 m (6 ft 1 in)
- Weight: 120 kg (260 lb)

Sport
- Sport: Sumo
- Retired: March, 1982
- Heya: Hanakago
- Record: 498-482-14
- Debut: May, 1966
- Highest rank: Maegashira 11 (January, 1977)
- Elder name: see bio
- Championships: 1 (Jūryō)
- Updated on June 2020

Daigō Kenshi (born 23 May 1952 as Noburu Itakura) is a former sumo wrestler from Yamamoto, Akita, Japan. He began his professional debut in May 1966 and reached the top division in November 1975. His highest rank was maegashira 11. Upon retirement from active competition he became an elder in the Japan Sumo Association. He was forced to leave the Sumo Association in September 1988, as the Kitajin elder name he was using was needed by the retiring sekiwake Kirinji.

== Career record ==
Daigō Kenshi
Year	January Hatsu basho, Tokyo	March Haru basho, Osaka	May Natsu basho, Tokyo	July Nagoya basho, Nagoya	September Aki basho, Tokyo	November Kyūshū basho, Fukuoka
1966	x	x	(Maezumo)	West Jonokuchi #27; 4–3	East Jonidan #74; Sat out due to injury 0–0–7	East Jonokuchi #1; 3–4
1967	East Jonokuchi #1; Sat out due to injury 0–0–7	(Maezumo)	West Jonokuchi #19; 5–2	West Jonidan #77; 3–4	East Jonidan #95; 4–3	West Jonidan #65; 4–3
1968	East Jonidan #45; 4–3	West Jonidan #22; 3–4	East Jonidan #33; 5–2	East Sandanme #99; 4–3	West Sandanme #78; 5–2	West Sandanme #45; 3–4
1969	West Sandanme #50; 2–5	West Sandanme #63; 2–5	West Sandanme #82; 5–2	West Sandanme #53; 6–1	East Sandanme #12; 6–1	East Makushita #42; 1–6
1970	East Sandanme #9; 3–4	East Sandanme #20; 5–2	East Makushita #60; 6–1	West Makushita #36; 1–6	West Sandanme #3; 6–1	West Makushita #36; 4–3
1971	East Makushita #29; 4–3	West Makushita #23; 5–2	East Makushita #12; 2–5	East Makushita #26; 3–4	East Makushita #35; 5–2	West Makushita #16; 5–2
1972	West Makushita #9; 3–4	East Makushita #13; 4–3	East Makushita #10; 3–4	East Makushita #17; 3–4	West Makushita #23; 4–3	West Makushita #20; 4–3
1973	East Makushita #15; 3–4	West Makushita #20; 3–4	West Makushita #26; 3–4	West Makushita #34; 3–4	East Makushita #44; 5–2	West Makushita #26; 5–2
1974	West Makushita #13; 3–4	West Makushita #17; 5–2	East Makushita #6; 2–5	West Makushita #20; 6–1	East Makushita #4; 3–4	West Makushita #7; 6–1
1975	East Makushita #1; 4–3	West Jūryō #13; 10–5	East Jūryō #6; 8–7	East Jūryō #4; 9–6	East Jūryō #1; 8–7	West Maegashira #13; 4–11
1976	West Jūryō #4; 7–8	West Jūryō #5; 8–7	West Jūryō #3; 8–7	East Jūryō #1; 8–7	East Maegashira #14; 5–10	West Jūryō #4; 11–4; Champion
1977	East Maegashira #11; 2–13	East Jūryō #8; 9–6	East Jūryō #4; 9–6	West Maegashira #12; 3–12	West Jūryō #4; 6–9	East Jūryō #10; 9–6
1978	East Jūryō #5; 9–6	East Jūryō #1; 6–9	West Jūryō #5; 10–5	West Jūryō #1; 8–7	West Jūryō #1; 6–9	West Jūryō #7; 8–7
1979	East Jūryō #5; 8–7	West Jūryō #2; 7–8	East Jūryō #3; 7–8	West Jūryō #3; 8–7	West Jūryō #1; 5–10	East Jūryō #8; 10–5
1980	East Jūryō #2; 8–7	East Jūryō #2; 7–8	West Jūryō #5; 7–8	West Jūryō #7; 7–8	West Jūryō #9; 8–7	East Jūryō #7; 6–9
1981	East Jūryō #9; 8–7	East Jūryō #5; 5–10	East Jūryō #11; 8–7	West Jūryō #8; 8–7	East Jūryō #8; 6–9	West Jūryō #13; 6–9
1982	West Makushita #3; 5–2	West Jūryō #12; Retired; 3–12	x	x	x	x
Record given as wins–losses–absences Top division champion Top division runner-up Retired Lower divisions Non-participation Sanshō key: F=Fighting spirit; O=Outstanding performance; T=Technique Also shown: ★=Kinboshi; P=Playoff(s); Divisions: Makuuchi — Jūryō — Makushita — Sandanme — Jonidan — Jonokuchi Makuuchi ranks: Yokozuna — Ōzeki — Sekiwake — Komusubi — Maegashira

== See also ==
- Glossary of sumo terms
- List of past sumo wrestlers
- List of sumo tournament second division champions
