= Ōtsukasa Nobuhide =

Japanese sumo wrestler

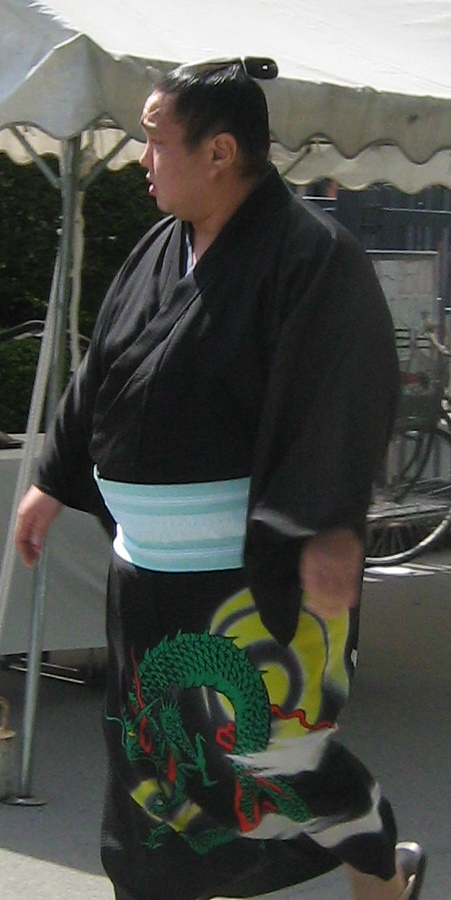

Personal information
- Native name: 皇司 信秀
- Born: Nobuhide Ōuchi; February 18, 1971 (age 55) Hyōgo, Japan
- Height: 1.75 m (5 ft 9 in)
- Weight: 149 kg (328 lb)

Sport
- Sport: Sumo
- Retired: March, 2009
- Heya: Irumagawa
- Record: 616–660–1
- Debut: March, 1993
- Highest rank: Maegashira 4 (July, 2001)
- Elder name: Wakafuji
- Championships: 2 (Jūryō); 1 (Makushita)
- Updated on Mar 2009

Ōtsukasa Nobuhide (皇司信秀 (Ōtsukasanobuhide), born February 18, 1971, as Nobuhide Ōuchi) is a former sumo wrestler from Miki, Hyōgo, Japan. A former amateur champion, he made his professional debut in 1993. The highest rank he reached was maegashira 4. He retired in March 2009 and is now a sumo coach.

== Career ==
Ōtsukasa began sumo at Miki Middle School and was a member of Ichikawa High School's sumo club, where he won national high school sumo championships. He continued his amateur sumo career at Nihon University.

Ōtsukasa was recruited by the former sekiwake Tochitsukasa, also a Nihon University alumni and head of the then-newly formed Irumagawa stable. He made his professional debut in March 1993. Due to his amateur achievements, he was given makushita tsukedashi status, meaning he could enter in the third-highest makushita division. Initially fighting under his real name of Ōuchi, he won the makushita yūshō or championship in only his second tournament, with a perfect 7–0 record. However, it was not until January 1996 that he became a sekitori by earning promotion to the second-highest jūryō division, upon which he adopted the shikona of Ōtsukasa. After a couple of short spells back in the makushita division, he took the jūryō division championship in May 1999 with an 11–4 record. He made the top makuuchi division for the first time in September 1999. The 39 tournaments it took him from his professional debut to reach makuuchi is the third-slowest amongst former collegiate wrestlers.

During his sekitori career (75 tournaments in total) Ōtsukasa was a classic "elevator wrestler", too good for jūryō but not quite good enough for the top division. He was promoted to makuuchi no less than 11 times in total. This is two fewer than the record of 13 promotions held by Ōshio, a record Ōtsukasa said he would have liked to break. Ōtsukasa was ranked in the top division for three of the six tournaments held in 2007 but did not manage a majority of wins against losses in makuuchi after July 2004. His last promotion in March 2008 made him the third-oldest postwar wrestler to earn promotion to the top division at 37 years. He won his first four bouts on his final return but then lost 10 in a row to finish with a 5–10 score.

He won a second jūryō championship in January 2005. After the retirement of Kotonowaka in November 2005 he was the oldest man in the sekitori ranks (the top two divisions). Restricted by a shoulder injury, he produced only one winning record after January 2008. After the 2009 Haru basho, Ōtsukasa would have dropped out of jūryō (see retirement below). His departure left Tosanoumi, who is two days under a year younger than Ōtsukasa, as the oldest active sekitori.

== Fighting style ==
His most frequently used kimarite or technique was a simple yori-kiri or force out, but he also favoured pushing or thrusting moves such as oshi-dashi and tsuki-otoshi, and pull downs such as hataki-komi and hiki-otoshi. At 175 cm or 5 ft 9 in he was one of the shortest wrestlers in the top two divisions.

== Retirement from sumo ==
Ōtsukasa pulled out of the March 2009 tournament on the 13th day with only one win, facing certain demotion to makushita for the first time since 1998. Before the start of the 14th day's matches, he officially announced his retirement from sumo at the age of 38. He said that although he would have liked to have reached a san'yaku rank, he left with no regrets. He has stayed in the sumo world as a coach at Irumagawa stable, having purchased the toshiyori name of Wakafuji. His danpatsu-shiki, or official retirement ceremony, was held at the Ryōgoku Kokugikan on January 30, 2010. In February 2022 he transferred to Kise stable.

== Personal life ==
He married in October 2013 and the wedding reception was held in August 2014.

== Career record ==
Ōtsukasa Nobuhide
Year	January Hatsu basho, Tokyo	March Haru basho, Osaka	May Natsu basho, Tokyo	July Nagoya basho, Nagoya	September Aki basho, Tokyo	November Kyūshū basho, Fukuoka
1993	x	Makushita tsukedashi #60; 4–3	West Makushita #48; 7–0; Champion	East Makushita #5; 3–3–1	West Makushita #10; 2–5	East Makushita #22; 2–5
1994	East Makushita #40; 3–4	West Makushita #52; 5–2	West Makushita #31; 2–5	West Makushita #48; 5–2	West Makushita #30; 5–2	West Makushita #19; 4–3
1995	West Makushita #14; 4–3	West Makushita #9; 5–2	West Makushita #4; 5–2	East Makushita #1; 2–5	East Makushita #16; 6–1	East Makushita #3; 5–2
1996	West Jūryō #12; 4–11	West Makushita #6; 2–5	East Makushita #18; 6–1	East Makushita #3; 4–3	East Makushita #2; 5–2	West Jūryō #12; 8–7
1997	West Jūryō #8; 8–7	West Jūryō #6; 6–9	West Jūryō #9; 8–7	East Jūryō #7; 5–10	East Jūryō #12; 8–7	West Jūryō #7; 6–9
1998	East Jūryō #11; 6–9	East Makushita #1; 4–3	East Jūryō #12; 9–6	West Jūryō #7; 6–9	West Jūryō #11; 9–6	West Jūryō #8; 6–9
1999	West Jūryō #11; 8–7	East Jūryō #10; 9–6	East Jūryō #6; 11–4; Champion	East Jūryō #1; 9–6	East Maegashira #14; 8–7	West Maegashira #11; 8–7
2000	West Maegashira #10; 5–10	East Jūryō #1; 6–9	East Jūryō #3; 9–6	West Maegashira #12; 8–7	East Maegashira #11; 6–9	East Maegashira #13; 5–10
2001	West Jūryō #3; 10–5	East Maegashira #12; 8–7	East Maegashira #8; 8–7	West Maegashira #4; 4–11	West Maegashira #9; 7–8	East Maegashira #11; 8–7
2002	West Maegashira #7; 8–7	West Maegashira #5; 6–9	East Maegashira #7; 7–8	East Maegashira #9; 5–10	West Maegashira #12; 5–10	West Jūryō #3; 10–5
2003	East Maegashira #13; 4–11	West Jūryō #2; 9–6	West Maegashira #14; 8–7	West Maegashira #10; 5–10	East Maegashira #15; 8–7	West Maegashira #13; 5–10
2004	East Jūryō #2; 8–7	West Jūryō #1; 7–8	West Jūryō #2; 9–6	West Maegashira #14; 8–7	West Maegashira #13; 3–12	West Jūryō #4; 5–10
2005	West Jūryō #7; 12–3; Champion	West Maegashira #16; 4–11	West Jūryō #4; 9–6	West Jūryō #1; 4–11	East Jūryō #8; 6–9	East Jūryō #11; 10–5
2006	West Jūryō #4; 10–5	West Maegashira #15; 4–11	East Jūryō #5; 6–9	East Jūryō #8; 9–6	East Jūryō #5; 10–5	East Maegashira #15; 7–8
2007	West Maegashira #16; 7–8	East Jūryō #1; 11–4	East Maegashira #11; 4–11	East Maegashira #17; 6–9	East Jūryō #2; 7–8	West Jūryō #3; 7–8
2008	West Jūryō #4; 9–6	East Maegashira #16; 5–10	West Jūryō #4; 5–10	East Jūryō #10; 7–8	West Jūryō #12; 9–6	East Jūryō #4; 5–10
2009	East Jūryō #8; 6–9	East Jūryō #12; Retired; 1–12	x	x	x	x
Record given as wins–losses–absences Top division champion Top division runner-up Retired Lower divisions Non-participation Sanshō key: F=Fighting spirit; O=Outstanding performance; T=Technique Also shown: ★=Kinboshi; P=Playoff(s); Divisions: Makuuchi — Jūryō — Makushita — Sandanme — Jonidan — Jonokuchi Makuuchi ranks: Yokozuna — Ōzeki — Sekiwake — Komusubi — Maegashira

== See also ==
- Glossary of sumo terms
- List of sumo tournament second division champions
- List of past sumo wrestlers
- List of sumo elders
