= Masatsukasa Kōshin =

Japanese sumo wrestler

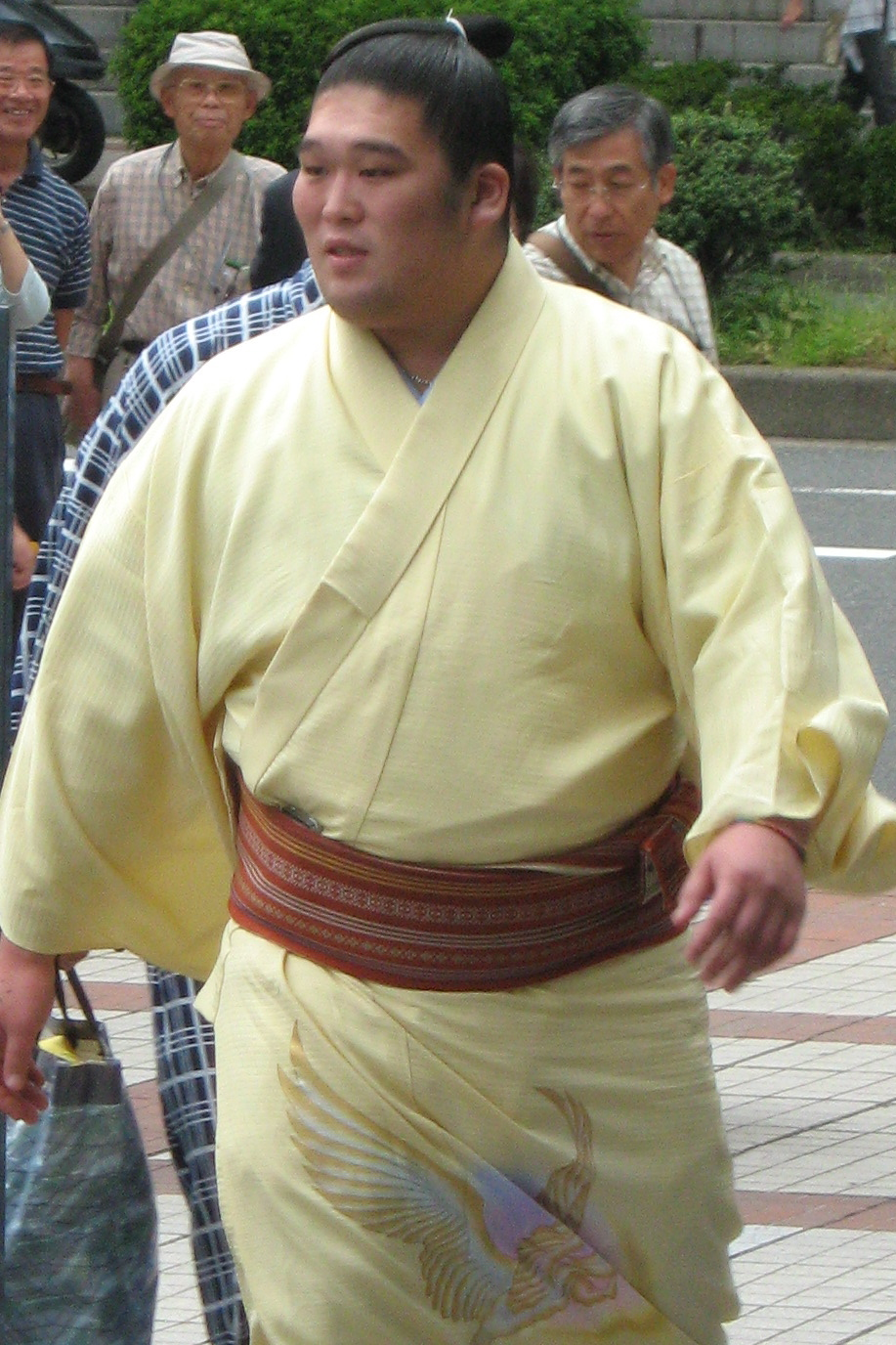

Personal information
- Native name: 将司昂親
- Born: Masahito Ono; 7 June 1984 (age 42) Aomori, Japan
- Height: 1.83 m (6 ft 0 in)
- Weight: 134 kg (295 lb; 21.1 st)

Sport
- Sport: Sumo
- Retired: April 2011
- Heya: Irumagawa
- Record: 305-266-21
- Debut: January, 2003
- Highest rank: Maegashira 8 (September, 2008)
- Championships: 1 (Jūryō); 1 (Jonidan)
- Updated on April 2011

Masatsukasa Kōshin (born 7 June 1984 as Masahito Ono) is a former sumo wrestler from Aomori Prefecture, Japan. His highest rank was maegashira 8. He was forced to retire in April 2011 after an investigation by the Japan Sumo Association found him guilty of match-fixing.

== Career ==
Born in Fukaura, Nishitsugaru (also the home town of Kaiho, Aminishiki and Asofuji), he made his professional debut in January 2003 joining Irumagawa stable.

In his first tournament on the banzuke ranking sheets in March 2003, he took the yusho or tournament championship with a perfect 7-0 record. Six consecutive kachi-koshi or winning scores saw him reach the third highest makushita division in March 2004 and he became a sekitori on his promotion to the jūryō division in September 2005. After three poor performances he was demoted back to makushita in March 2006 but made an immediate return to the second division, and although he was never able to win more than nine bouts out of fifteen in any one tournament, a series of steady scores took him up to Jūryō 3. A 9-6 score in May 2008, winning his last four matches, was enough to earn him promotion to the top makuuchi division for the July 2008 basho.

He scored an impressive ten wins in his top division debut, which resulted in promotion to his highest rank of maegashira 8, but he had three make-koshi or losing scores in the next three tournaments, and fell back to the jūryō division in March 2009. In September he returned to the top division at the very lowest rank of maegashira 16. He made an excellent start, winning his first five bouts, but eight losses in the next ten days saw him narrowly fail to maintain his makuuchi position. In July 2010 he secured the jūryō championship by the 13th day, and was promoted back to the top division at maegashira 8. However, he was unable to take part in the September tournament due to an injury to his left ankle. Back in jūryō for the November tournament, he secured his kachi-koshi by winning his last two bouts to finish on 8-7.

== Retirement from sumo ==
Masatsukasa was one of 23 wrestlers found guilty of fixing the result of bouts after an investigation by the Japan Sumo Association, and he was ordered to retire in April 2011.

== Fighting style ==
Masatsukasa favoured pushing and thrusting techniques, with his most common winning kimarite being oshi-dashi, or push-out.

== Family ==
Upon becoming a sekitori in August 2005 he revealed that he had been married since May 2003. His wife and his two-year-old son were living with his parents back in Aomori. He did not feel he could say anything publicly before reaching a salaried rank.

He first adopted the shikona or fighting name of Masatsukasa in July 2003. In September 2008 he changed the second part of his shikona from Tadashi to Koshin, the name of his son.

== Career record ==
Masatsukasa Kōshin
Year	January Hatsu basho, Tokyo	March Haru basho, Osaka	May Natsu basho, Tokyo	July Nagoya basho, Nagoya	September Aki basho, Tokyo	November Kyūshū basho, Fukuoka
2003	(Maezumo)	East Jonokuchi #27; 7–0; Champion	East Jonidan #24; 6–1	West Sandanme #61; 5–2	East Sandanme #35; 4–3	East Sandanme #22; 4–2–1
2004	East Sandanme #8; 5–2	West Makushita #45; 6–1	East Makushita #19; 3–4	East Makushita #25; 4–3	East Makushita #19; 3–4	West Makushita #23; 4–3
2005	West Makushita #18; 6–1	East Makushita #7; 6–1–P	West Makushita #1; 3–4	West Makushita #3; 6–1	East Jūryō #11; 7–8	West Jūryō #11; 5–10
2006	West Jūryō #14; 6–9	East Makushita #2; 4–3	East Jūryō #14; 8–5–2	West Jūryō #12; 8–7	East Jūryō #9; 7–8	East Jūryō #10; 8–7
2007	West Jūryō #7; 8–7	West Jūryō #3; 7–8	East Jūryō #4; 6–6–3	West Jūryō #6; 7–8	West Jūryō #7; 7–8	West Jūryō #8; 7–8
2008	East Jūryō #10; 8–7	East Jūryō #9; 9–6	East Jūryō #3; 9–6	East Maegashira #16; 10–5	West Maegashira #8; 5–10	East Maegashira #13; 6–9
2009	West Maegashira #14; 4–11	East Jūryō #5; 8–7	East Jūryō #2; 7–8	East Jūryō #3; 9–6	East Maegashira #16; 7–8	East Jūryō #1; 4–11
2010	West Jūryō #6; 9–6	East Jūryō #2; 6–9	East Jūryō #5; 8–7	West Jūryō #3; 13–2; Champion	West Maegashira #8; Sat out due to injury 0–0–15	West Jūryō #5; 8–7
2011	West Jūryō #4; 8–7	Tournament Cancelled; 0–0–0	West Jūryō #2; Retired –	x	x	x
Record given as wins–losses–absences Top division champion Top division runner-up Retired Lower divisions Non-participation Sanshō key: F=Fighting spirit; O=Outstanding performance; T=Technique Also shown: ★=Kinboshi; P=Playoff(s); Divisions: Makuuchi — Jūryō — Makushita — Sandanme — Jonidan — Jonokuchi Makuuchi ranks: Yokozuna — Ōzeki — Sekiwake — Komusubi — Maegashira

== See also ==
- List of sumo tournament second division champions
- List of past sumo wrestlers
- Glossary of sumo terms
