= List of sumo tournament second division champions =

This is a list of all professional sumo wrestlers who have won the championship for the second division jūryō at a Japanese grand sumo tournament since 1909, when the current championship system was established.

The wrestler who has won the most jūryō championships is Masurao, claiming five between 1985 and 1990. The only wrestlers to have won the top division makuuchi first before winning jūryō later are Wakanami (1968/69), Tagaryū (1984/88), Asanoyama (2019/23) and Wakatakakage (2022/24 and 2026/26); additionally Terunofuji (2013/15/20), Ichinojō (2014/22/23) and Takerufuji (2024/24/24) won a first makuuchi cup inbetween winning their second jūryō title. Only Ryōgoku (1914) and Takerufuji (2024) managed to win jūryō and makuuchi consecutively, the latter on top division debut. The only wrestlers to win the jūryō championship but never earn promotion to the top division are Genbuyama (1927), Sagahikari (1957), Tochiizumi (1983), Hidenohana (1988), Daigaku (1991), Hakuyozan (2021), Tochimusashi (2022), Mita (2025).

== 1958 to present ==
The table lists all jūryō champions since 1958, the advent of the bimonthly tournament schedule. The championship is determined by the wrestler with the highest win–loss score after fifteen bouts, held at a rate of one per day over the duration of a 15-day tournament. In the event of a tie for first place, a playoff is held between the wrestlers concerned.

Below a wrestler's ring name (shikona) their rank and win–loss score that tournament are given. –P indicates an additional bout fought in a yūshō playoff. Number of championships are given in parentheses. (x) marks a singular career championship. ^{†} marks a shikona before a name change. ^{‡} marks a shikona after a name change. Names in bold mark an undefeated tournament victory (zenshō-yūshō). Names in italics mark a yūshō by a shin-jūryō, a rookie wrestler in their very first second division outing.

| | January | March | May | July | September | November |
| year in sumo | Tokyo | Osaka | Tokyo | Nagoya | Tokyo | Kyushu |
|---|---|---|---|---|---|---|
| 2027 | **(10–24 Jan)** | **(14–28 Mar)** | **(9–23 May)** | **(11–25 Jul)** | **(12–26 Sep)** | **(14–28 Nov)** |
| 2026 | Wakanoshō; J11e 12–3 (x) | Dewanoryū; J10e 11–4–P (x) | Kazuma; J6e 12–3 (x) | Shonannoumi; J6e 11–4–PP (x) | Kitanowaka; J6e 11–4–PP (x) | Wakatakakage; J5w 14–1 (2) |
| 2025 | Shishi; J4w 13–2 (x) | Kusano^{†} J14w 14–1 (1) | Kusano^{†} J1w 13–2 (2) | Mita; J11w 11–4 (x) | Asahakuryū; J11w 13–2 (x) | Fujiryōga; J13w 13–2 (x) |
| 2024 | Takerufuji; J10e 13–2 (1) | Mitoryu; J2w 12–3 (2) | Wakatakakage; J6w 14–1 (1) | Shirokuma; J8e 12–3 (x) | Takerufuji; J11w 13–2 (2) | Kinbozan; J1w 12–3 (x) |
| 2023 | Asanoyama; J12w 14–1 (x) | Ichinojō; J3e 14–1 (2) | Gōnoyama; J1e 14–1–P (x) | Atamifuji; J1w 11–4–P (x) | Ichiyamamoto; J7w 13–2 (2) | Kotoshoho; J1w 12–3–P (3) |
| 2022 | Kotoshoho; J2w 11–4–P (2) | Ryūden; J13e 13–2 (1) | Nishikifuji; J6w 11–4–P (x) | Ryūden; J1e 12–3 (2) | Tochimusashi; J14e 11–4 (x) | Ōshōma; J12w 11–4–P (x) |
| 2021 | Tsurugisho; J8e 12–3 (2) | Hakuyozan (Note: Due to the COVID-19 pandemic in Japan, the tournament was held in Tokyo to avoid unnecessary domestic travel.); J9w 11–4 (x) | Ura; J2w 12–3 (x) | Mitoryu; J6w 12–3 (1) | Abi; J5e 13–2 (2) | Ichiyamamoto; J4w 13–2 (1) |
| 2020 | Terunofuji; J13w 13–2 (2) | Kotoshoho; J6e 12–3 (1) | **Not held** (COVID-19) | Meisei; J1e 10–5–PPP (x) | Chiyonokuni; J11w 14–1 (3) | Midorifuji; J2e 10–5–P (x) |
| 2019 | Shimanoumi; J11e 13–2 (1) | Shimanoumi; J1e 13–2 (2) | Takagenji; J2e 13–2 (x) | Tsurugisho; J6e 13–2 (1) | Ikioi; J12w 12–3 (2) | Azumaryu; J1e 11–4–PP (x) |
| 2018 | Myōgiryū; J1e 10–5–P (3) | Sadanoumi; J4e 11–4–P (x) | Ōnoshō; J1w 12–3 (x) | Takanoiwa; J3w 13–2–P (2) | Tokushōryū; J11e 11–4–P (x) | Tomokaze; J14w 12–3 (x) |
| 2017 | Daieishō; J2w 12–3 (x) | Toyohibiki; J3w 10–5–PP (3) | Nishikigi; J4e 10–5 (x) | Daiamami; J8e 11–4 (x) | Abi; J11w 10–5–PP (1) | Sōkokurai; J7w 14–1 (x) |
| 2016 | Hidenoumi; J2w 11–4 (x) | Ōsunaarashi; J1e 13–2 (x) | Chiyonokuni; J3e 12–3 (2) | Amakaze; J11w 13–2 (x) | Daiki^{†} J6w 12–3 (x) | Satō^{†} J3w 12–3 (x) |
| 2015 | Kitataiki; J3e 13–2 (2) | Fujiazuma; J3e 12–3 (x) | Kagamiō; J9e 12–3 (x) | Mitakeumi; J12w 11–4 (x) | Shōhōzan; J6w 13–2 (x) | Shōdai; J5w 13–2 (x) |
| 2014 | Chiyomaru; J6e 13–2 (x) | Hōmashō; J2w 14–1 (x) | Ichinojō; J10w 11–4–PP (1) | Tochinoshin; J12e 13–2–P (2) | **Tochinoshin**; J5w 15–0 (3) | Tokitenkū; J1e 12–3 (2) |
| 2013 | Takanoiwa; J13e 12–3 (1) | Kyokushūhō; J2e 12–3 (x) | Kotoyūki; J3w 13–2 (x) | Endō; J13w 14–1 (x) | Terunofuji; J11w 12–3–P (1) | Chiyoōtori; J2e 13–2 (x) |
| 2012 | Chiyotairyū; J13w 13–2 (x) | Kimikaze; J7w 12–3 (x) | Tamaasuka; J2w 12–3 (2) | Chiyonokuni; J11e 11–4 (1) | Jōkōryū; J3w 11–4–P (x) | Sadanofuji; J4w 14–1 (x) |
| 2011 | Kasugaō; J12e 12–3–P (2) | **Not held** (match-fixing) | Sagatsukasa; J12e 12–3 (x) | Myōgiryū; J12w 11–4–P (1) | Myōgiryū; J3e 13–2 (2) | Ikioi; J14e 12–3 (1) |
| 2010 | Gagamaru; J13e 12–3 (x) | Kimurayama; J4w 11–4–PP (2) | Bushūyama; J5w 11–4 (2) | Masatsukasa; J3w 13–2 (x) | Toyonoshima; J1w 14–1 (2) | Kaisei; J6e 11–4–PP (x) |
| 2009 | Shōtenrō; J1e 11–4–P (2) | Toyohibiki; J3w 12–3 (2) | Tamaasuka; J13w 12–3 (1) | Wakanosato; J6w 14–1 (4) | Tamawashi; J1e 11–4 (x) | Kitataiki; J5e 10–5–PP (1) |
| 2008 | Tochinoshin; J12w 12–3 (1) | Kimurayama; J14e 12–3 (1) | Chiyohakuhō; J11e 13–2 (x) | Bushūyama; J8e 12–3 (1) | Aran; J6w 12–3 (x) | Shōtenrō; J9w 12–3 (1) |
| 2007 | Toyohibiki; J14e 10–5–PPP (1) | Satoyama; J4e 12–3 (x) | Baruto; J11w 14–1 (2) | Iwakiyama; J1e 12–3–PP (2) | Baruto; J9w 13–2 (3) | Sakaizawa; J13e 13–2–P (x) |
| 2006 | Tochinonada; J1e 13–2 (2) | **Baruto**; J11e 15–0 (1) | Toyozakura; J3w 10–5–PPPP (x) | Hōchiyama; J6e 13–2 (x) | Takanowaka; J8e 11–4 (x) | Jūmonji; J2w 13–2 (x) |
| 2005 | Ōtsukasa; J7w 12–3 (2) | Kotoshōgiku; J4e 13–2 (x) | Tochisakae; J2e 12–3 (2) | Tokitsuumi; J3w 11–4 (2) | Toyonoshima; J1w 14–1 (1) | Tōki; J13e 12–3 |
| 2004 | Wakanoyama; J6w 11–4–PPP (2) | Hakuhō; J8w 12–3–P (x) | Tokitenkū; J10w 12–3 (1) | Kotoōshū; J3e 13–2 (x) | Ama^{†} J4e 11–4–P (x) | Ishide^{†} J13w 12–3 (x) |
| 2003 | Asasekiryū; J1w 11–4–P (x) | Tochisakae; J8e 10–5–PP (1) | Tamakasuga; J7w 12–3 (x) | Kakizoe; J2e 11–4 (x) | Takekaze; J5e 13–2 (x) | Kokkai; J2w 14–1 (x) |
| 2002 | Takamisakari; J5w 12–3–P (x) | Kotoryū; J1w 12–3 (x) | Iwakiyama; J9e 11–4–P (1) | Ushiomaru; J8w 13–2 (x) | Tamarikidō; J4w 11–4–PP (x) | Kasugaō; J6e 11–4 (1) |
| 2001 | Tamanonada^{†} J1e 12–3 (x) | Wakatsutomu; J3e 10–5–P (x) | Kitazakura; J1w 13–2 (x) | Buyūzan; J12e 9–6–PPP (x) | Aogiyama; J5w 12–3–P (2) | Ōikari; J3e 11–4 (2) |
| 2000 | Oginishiki; J2e 13–2 (2) | Tochinohana; J6w 13–2–PP (x) | Wakanosato; J11e 12–3 (2) | Wakanosato; J1e 13–2 (3) | Kotomitsuki; J4e 14–1 (x) | Kinkaiyama; J1w 12–3 (3) |
| 1999 | Miyabiyama; J1w 14–1 (2) | Daizen; J2w 12–3 (3) | Ōtsukasa; J6e 11–4 (1) | Kinkaiyama; J2e 10–5–PP (2) | Hayateumi; J8w 12–3 (x) | Oginishiki; J5e 11–4–P (1) |
| 1998 | Kinkaiyama; J13w 12–3 (1) | Kushimaumi; J9e 12–3–P (3) | Ōikari; J9w 10–5–PP (1) | Akinoshū; J6e 12–3 (x) | Chiyotenzan; J8e 12–3 (x) | Miyabiyama; J11w 11–4 (1) |
| 1997 | Dejima; J2e 12–3 (x) | Chiyotaikai; J9e 11–4 (1) | Tokitsuumi; J13w 12–3 (1) | Chiyotaikai; J1e 11–4 (2) | Oginohana; J8w 12–3 (4) | Wakanosato; J12e 10–5–P (1) |
| 1996 | Rikiō; J9e 10–5–P (1) | Kyokushūzan; J8w 11–4–P (2) | Rikiō; J3w 12–3 (2) | Daizen; J5e 11–4–P (2) | Tochiazuma II; J3w 12–3 (x) | Tochinonada; J13w 13–2 (1) |
| 1995 | Asahiyutaka; J2e 11–4–PP (x) | Tokitsunada; J1e 10–5–P (2) | Tosanoumi; J1e 14–1 (2) | Kyokūshuzan; J13e 10–5 (1) | Wakanojō; J12w 12–3 (x) | Wakanoyama; J9w 11–4–P (1) |
| 1994 | Naminohana; J6e 11–4 (1) | Shikishima; J11w 12–3 (x) | Oginohana; J3w 12–3 (3) | Tatsuhikari; J10e 12–3 (2) | Naminohana; J1w 10–5 (2) | Tosanoumi; J13e 11–4–P (1) |
| 1993 | Aogiyama; J4e 11–4 (1) | Tokitsunada; J2w 11–4 (1) | Minatofuji; J8e 12–3 (x) | Tatsuhikari; J6e 12–3 (1) | Hamanoshima; J3w 11–4 (x) | Asanowaka; J4w 11–4–P (x) |
| 1992 | Toyonoumi^{‡} J2e 12–3 (2) | Enazakura; J8e 11–4 (x) | Kotogaume; J6e 11–4 (x) | Wakashōyō; J1w 11–4–P (x) | Kotobeppu; J5w 12–3 (x) | Komafudō; J12e 11–4 (x) |
| 1991 | Ryōgoku; J9e 12–3–P (x) | Kyokugōzan; J9w 11–4 (x) | Daishōhō; J2e 11–4 (x) | Musashimaru; J11e 11–4 (x) | Daizen; J5e 12–3–P (1) | Daigaku; J9e 10–5–PP (x) |
| 1990 | Masurao; J7w 12–3 (4) | Masurao; J2e 10–5–P (5) | Daishōyama; J11w 12–3 (x) | Wakahanada^{†} J2e 12–3 (x) | Oginohana; J2w 11–4–P (2) | Daikikō^{†} J9w 11–4 (x) |
| 1989 | Tochitsukasa; J5w 11–4 (1) | Kushimaumi; J12w 11–4–P (1) | Kushimaumi; J3e 10–5–PPP (2) | Tochitsukasa; J2e 12–3 (2) | Ryūkōzan; J9e 10–5–PP (x) | Oginohana; J6w 13–2 (1) |
| 1988 | Akinoshima; J4e 12–3 (x) | Wakasegawa; J1w 13–2 (3) | Hidenohana; J13w 11–4–P (x) | Tagaryū; J3e 10–5–PP (x) | Takanohama^{†} J5e 11–4 (1) | Masurao; J13w 11–4 (3) |
| 1987 | Tochimatoi; J10e 10–5–P (x) | Takamisugi; J7e 13–2 (x) | Ōnohana; J11w 11–4 (1) | Masudayama; J7w 11–4 (x) | Ōnohana; J9w 13–2 (2) | Hōō; 12–3 J7w (4) |
| 1986 | Mitoizumi; J4e 11–4–P (x) | Masurao; J4w 11–4 (2) | Chikubayama; J8w 11–4 (x) | Misugisato; J12w 11–4–P (x) | Kinoarashi; J8e 12–3 (x) | Tochinowaka; J3w 10–5–PP (x) |
| 1985 | Terao; J7w 12–3 (1) | Tamaryū; J4w 12–3 (x) | Terao; J3e 12–3 (2) | Masurao; J4e 10–5–PP (1) | Sasshūnada; J4e 10–5–P (x) | Wakasegawa; J11e 10–5–PP (2) |
| 1984 | Ōnishiki; J6e 12–3 (4) | Konishiki; J0w 13–2 (1) | Konishiki; J2e 11–4 (2) | Kitao^{†} J1w 12–3 (x) | Tochiakagi; J3w 11–4 (x) | Kotochitose; J10w 11–4–PP (2) |
| 1983 | Ōnokuni; J2w 11–4–PP (x) | Washūyama; J3e 11–4 (3) | Tochiizumi; J12e 11–4–P (x) | Hoshi^{†} J5e 10–5–P (x) | Hōō; J9e 13–2 (2) | Hōō; J1w 11–4–PP (3) |
| 1982 | Shishihō; J9e 13–2 (2) | Ōyutaka; J5e 12–3 (x) | Saisu; J5w 11–4–P (x) | Wakasegawa; J7e 11–4 (1) | Shishihō; J2e 13–2 (3) | Banryūyama; J10w 13–2 (4) |
| 1981 | Hidanohana; J3w 13–2 (x) | Kōtetsuyama II^{†} J2e 12–3 (2) | Azumanada^{†} J4e 12–3 (x) | Aobajō; J2w 10–5 (x) | Hōō; J5w 11–4 (1) | Wakajishi; J2e 11–4 (x) |
| 1980 | Taikō; J10e 11–4 (2) | Ōnishiki; J12e 12–3 (3) | Wakashimazu; J10w 10–5–PP (x) | Kōtetsuyama II^{†} J5e 13–2 (1) | Fujizakura; J3e 12–3–P (x) | Ōshio; J3e 12–3 (3) |
| 1979 | Ōshio; J4e 11–4–P (2) | Takanosato; J2e 11–4 (x) | Terunoyama; J1w 12–3 (x) | Shishihō^{†} J2e 10–5–P (1) | Kotochitose; J11w 10–5–PP (1) | Kotokaze; J11w 14–1 (x) |
| 1978 | Kurosegawa; J12e 11–4–P (x) | Taikō; J2e 11–4–P (1) | Washūyama; J6e 11–4–P (1) | Washūyama; J1e 10–5–PP (2) | Ōzutsu; J8w 11–4 (x) | Taniarashi^{†} J7e 13–2 (x) |
| 1977 | Kotogatake; J1w 10–5 (x) | Kotonofuji; J3e 11–4 (x) | Dewanohana; J13e 11–4 (x) | Ōnishiki; J2e 11–4 (2) | Chiyozakura; J2e 11–4 (2) | Tamakiyama; J2e 11–4 (2) |
| 1976 | Konuma; J5e 11–4 (x) | Banryūyama; J2e 11–4 (3) | Tochiisami; J10e 11–4–P (x) | Hachiya; J13e 11–4 (x) | Adachi^{†} J1w 10–5–P (x) | Daigō; J4w 11–4 (x) |
| 1975 | Banryūyama; J2e 11–4 (2) | Tamakiyama; J1e 11–4 (1) | Futatsuryū II; J7w 11–4 (1) | Tenryu; J10w 13–2 (x) | Aobayama; J4e 13–2 (x) | Futatsuryū II; J3e 12–3 (2) |
| 1974 | Chiyozakura; J12w 11–4 (1) | Kawasaki; J10e 12–3 (2) | Tokibayama; J7w 12–3 (2) | Kirinji II; J2w 12–3 (x) | Asanobori; J11w 11–4 (4) | Banryūyama; J11e 10–5–PP (1) |
| 1973 | Maruyama; J9w 11–4 (x) | Ryūko; J7w 11–4–P (2) | Obori^{†} J12w 11–4 (1) | Asanobori; J9e 12–3 (3) | Yoshinotani; J7w 11–4 (x) | Tokibayama; J11e 11–4 (1) |
| 1972 | Masuiyama; J8w 12–3 (x) | Asanobori; J3w 12–3 (2) | Wakanoumi II; J4e 10–5 (x) | Daiyū; 10–5–PP (2) | Tochifuji; J4e 10–5–PPPP (2) | Wakafutase Tadayuki; J2w 11–4–P (2) |
| 1971 | Shiratayama; J2e 11–4–P (x) | Nagahama^{†} J8w 12–3–P (2) | Ōshio; J5e 11–4–P (1) | Yoshioyama; J11e 13–2 (x) | Asahikuni; J3e 12–3 (x) | Kitaseumi; J8e 11–4 (x) |
| 1970 | Katsuhikari; J12e 13–2 (x) | Daiju; J1w 14–1 (x) | Kongō; J11e 12–3 (1) | Kongō; J3w 12–3 (2) | Wajima; J6w 13–2 (x) | Nagahama^{†} J5w 11–4 (1) |
| 1969 | Asanobori; J2w 11–4–P (1) | Asasegawa; J3e 12–3 (2) | Kawasaki^{†} J8w 12–3 (1) | Arashiyama; J8e 11–4 (x) | Wakanami; J5w 12–3 (x) | Takanohana I J2w 11–4 (2) |
| 1968 | Ryūko; J3e 13–2 (1) | Tochifuji; J10w 11–4 (x) | Yoshinohana; J2e 13–2 (2) | Wakamiyama; J1w 14–1 (x) | Hanada II^{†} J8w 11–4 (1) | Kaigō; J3w 12–3 (x) |
| 1967 | Mutsuarashi; J4e 11–4–P (x) | Matsumaeyama; J17w 12–3 (x) | Tensuiyama; J7e 12–3 (2) | Wakafutase; J3e 12–3 (1) | Tochiazuma I J2w 12–3 (x) | Wakanokuni; J2w 12–3 (3) |
| 1966 | Azumanishiki; J15w 11–4 (x) | Kiminishiki; J6e 13–2 (x) | Daishin; J5e 12–3 (x) | Maenoyama; J6e 13–2–P (x) | Daimonji; J4e 12–3 (x) | Kanenohana; J5e 13–2 (x) |
| 1965 | Wakanokuni; J9e 12–3 (2) | Tensuiyama; J4w 12–3–P (1) | Kiyonomori; J8w 13–2 (2) | Amatsukaze; J15w 12–3–P (2) | Hanahikari; J5w 12–3 (x) | Tamaarashi; J2w 12–3 (2) |
| 1964 | Wakatenryū; J5w 13–2–P (2) | Tochiōyama; J6w 12–3 (x) | Asasegawa; J3e 12–3 (1) | Hasegawa; J10e 13–2 (1) | Yoshinohana; J1w 12–3 (1) | Oiteyama; J3w 13–2 (x) |
| 1963 | Kotozakura; J4w 13–2 (2) | Daiyū; J4w 12–3–PP (1) | Kirinji I^{†} J9e 13–2 (x) | Kōtetsuyama I J2w 13–2–P (x) | Sawahikari; J5w 12–3 (x) | **Kitanofuji**; J5w 15–0 (x) |
| 1962 | Arakiyama^{†} J3w 12–3 (2) | Amatsukaze; J1e 11–4 (1) | Tamaarashi; J5e 12–3 (1) | Kotozakura; J16e 11–4–PP (1) | Wakatenryū; J7e 12–3 (1) | Okanoyama; J5e 14–1 (x) |
| 1961 | Yoshinomine; J9w 11–4–P (x) | Takanishiki; J13w 12–3 (2) | Kiyonomori; J1e 12–3 (1) | Wakachichibu; J1e 13–2 (2) | Ōtsuka; J3e 12–3–P (x) | **Uchida^{†}** J7w 15–0 (x) |
| 1960 | Yasome; J12e 12–3 (2) | Futatsuryū I J3w 12–3(x) | Kairyūyama; J8e 12–3 (x) | Hanada I^{†} J5e 14–1 (x) | Arakiyama^{†} J16w 12–3–P (1) | Wakakoma; J14w 12–3 (x) |
| 1959 | Wakasugiyama; J8e 12–3–P (x) | Yasome; J2w 13–2 (1) | Wakanokuni; J10e 12–3 (1) | Hoshikabuto; J2w 12–3 (2) | Udagawa; J12e 14–1 (x) | Taihō; J3e 13–2 (x) |
| 1958 | Tsunenishiki; J3e 13–2 (x) | Togashi^{†} J22e 12–3 (x) | Wakachichibu; J6w 11–4–PPP (1) | Aonosato; J20w 13–2 (1) | Kitabayama; J1e 14–1 (x) | Aonosato; J5e 14–1 (2) |

== 1909 to 1957 ==
The tables list all jūryō champions until 1957, before the conception of the current bimonthly schedule. The system was less regularized between years, with a different number of tournaments held at different times and in different venues, and often with a changing number of bouts fought in each tournament.

Playoffs were first introduced in 1947. From 1909 until 1946 a tie for first place would not be resolved, but rather the highest ranked wrestler would automatically be considered the champion.

| | January | March | May | September | November |
| | Tokyo | Osaka | Tokyo | Tokyo | Kyushu |
|---|---|---|---|---|---|
| 1957 | Oikawa; J15e 13–2 (1) | Fusanishiki; J7e 13–2 (x) | Oikawa; J3w 13–2 (2) | Atagoyama; J1e 13–2 (x) | Sagahikari; J15e 13–2–P (x) |

| | New Year | Spring | Summer | Autumn |
| | Tokyo | Osaka | Tokyo | Tokyo |
|---|---|---|---|---|
| 1956 | Iwakaze; J8w 11–4–P (x) | Takanishiki; J22e 12–3 (x) | Tachikaze; J12e 11–4–PP (x) | Otayama; J15w 12–3 (x) |
| 1955 | Hoshikabuto; J14w 1–4–PP (1) | Tochihikari; J3w 15–0 (x) | Hirakagawa; J11e 12–3 (x) | Kamioiyama; J8w 13–2 (x) |
| 1954 | Kiryugawa; J5e 13–2 (x) | Aichiyama; J20w 13–2–P (x) | Wakanoumi I J7e 13–2 (2) | Hakuryuyama; J6w 12–3–P (x) |
| 1953 | Naruyama; J18e 12–3 (1) | Dewaminato II; J3e 11–4–P (x) | Naruyama; J5w 12–3 (2) | Toyonobori; J13e 12–3–P (x) |

| | Spring | Summer | Autumn |
| | Tokyo | Tokyo | Tokyo |
|---|---|---|---|
| 1952 | Fujitayama; J3w 13–2 (x) | Imaoshima^{†} J15w 12–3 (x) | Kakureizan^{†} J10e 11–4–P (x) |
| 1951 | Hiodoshi; J7e 12–3 (x) | Oiwazan; J3e 12–3 (x) | Shionishiki; J2w 13–2–P (x) |
| 1950 | Masumiyama; J7w 13–2 (x) | Kainoyama; J9e 13–2 (x) | Yonekawa^{†} J11e 14–1 (x) |
| 1949 | Narutoumi; J9e 9–4–PP (x) | Onobori; J7w 11–4 (x) | Kotogahama; J11w 11–4–PP (x) |
| 1948 | Not held | Kuninobori; J1w 9–2–P (2) | Kiyoenami; J1e 9–2 (x) |
| 1947 | Not held | Dewanishiki; J1e 9–1–P (x) | Kuninobori; J10e 10–1 (1) |
| 1946 | Not held | Not held | Iwahira^{†} J6w 10–3 (x) |
| 1945 | Not held | Chiyonoyama; J2e 6–1 (2) | Hajimayama; J3e 8–2 (x) |
| 1944 | Kusunishiki; J14w 13–2 | Hirosegawa; J1w 9–1 (x) | Chiyonoyama; J13w 8–2 (1) |
| 1943 | Azumafuji; J2e 14–1 (x) | Mitsuneyama; J3e 13–2 (x) | Not held |
| 1942 | Surugaumi; J14w 13–2 (1) | Surugaumi; J1w 14–1 (2) | Not held |
| 1941 | Futamiyama; J2e 13–2 (x) | Terunobori; J7e 14–1 (x) | Not held |
| 1940 | Futasegawa; J2w 11–4 (x) | Masuiyama I J4w 12–3 (x) | Not held |
| 1939 | Terukuni; J8w 11–2 (x) | Shikainami; J10w 13–2 (x) | Not held |
| 1938 | Ryūozan; J3w 11–2 (x) | Fujinosato; J2w 10–3 | Not held |
| 1937 | Haguroyama; J8e 9–2 (x) | Kinkazan; J2e 11–2 (2) | Not held |
| 1936 | Onami; J2w 10–1 (2) | Maedayama; J4w 10–1 (x) | Not held |
| 1935 | Kasagiyama; J3w 11–0 (x) | Ayanishiki; J7w 10–1 (x) | Not held |
| 1934 | Komanosato; J1e 9–2 (x) | Dewaminato I J3e 11–0 (x) | Not held |
| 1933 | Ayanobori; J11eBS 10–1–P (x) | Choshinada; J10e 10–1 (x) | Not held |

| | Spring | March | Summer | October |
| | Tokyo | varied | Tokyo | varied |
|---|---|---|---|---|
| 1932 | Onami; J8e 8–0 (1) | Toshuzan; J7w 8–2 (x) | Ononishiki^{†} J8w 8–3 (x) | Kyushuzan; J10w 9–2 (x) |
| 1931 | Takanohana; J2w 8–3 (x) | Kinkazan; J8w 10–1 (1) | Ōshio; J2e 8–3 (x) | Kaneminato; J8w 8–3 (x) |
| 1930 | Ayazakura^{†} J1w 10–1 (x) | Okitsuumi; J5e 9–2 (1) | Tokiwano; J6e 9–2 (x) | Okitsuumi; J1e 9–2 (2) |
| 1929 | Musashiyama; J4w 11–0 (x) | Shimizugawa; J12e 10–1 (1) | Shimizugawa; J1w 11–0 (2) | Ōshima; J5e 10–1 (x) |
| 1928 | Tenryū; J10e 10–1 (x) | Koganoura; J7e 8–2–1d (x) | Wakashima; J7e 9–2 (1) | Wakashima; J7e 10–1 (2) |
| 1927 | Shinkai; J2w 8–0 (x) | Genbuyama; J11w 9–2 (x) | Hatasegawa; J8e 8–0 (1) | Hatasegawa; J1e 9–2 (2) |

- March tournaments were held at the following locations: 1927, 1929, 1930 and October 1931 in Osaka; 1928 and 1931 in Nagoya; 1932 in Kyoto.
- October tournaments were held at the following locations: 1927 and 1932 in Kyoto, 1928 in Hiroshima, 1929 in Nagoya, 1930 in Fukuoka, 1931 in Osaka.
- The October 1929 tournament was actually held in September.
- The Spring 1932 tournament was actually held in February.

| | Spring | Summer |
| | varied | varied |
|---|---|---|
| 1926 | Takaragawa; J11w 6–0 (x) | Hoshikabuto; J5w 7–0 (x) |
| 1925 | Rainomine; J1e 7–1 (x) | Kenrokuzan; J6w 5–0–1a (x) |
| 1924 | Hitachidake; J2e 5–2 (x) | Nishikinada II; J4e 7–0 (x) |
| 1923 | Hitachiiwa; J6e 8–1 (x) | Ichinohama; J9w 6–0 (x) |
| 1922 | Noshirogata II; J4w 7–1 (x) | Naranishiki; J1w 6–2–1d (x) |
| 1921 | Nishikinada I J15w 5–0 (2) | Hitachishima; J8e 6–1 (x) |
| 1920 | Mayaoroshi^{†} J4e 6–1–1a (x) | Tsurugahama; J2w 7–2 (x) |
| 1919 | Akutsugawa; J9w 5–0 (1) | Akutsugawa; J1e 7–2 (2) |
| 1918 | Yahazuyama; J5w 8–0 (x) | Nishikinada I J2w 5–0–1a (1) |
| 1917 | Tsunenohana; J5e 7–2 (x) | Wakahitachi; J14e 5–0 (x) |
| 1916 | Momijigawa; J3w 7–3 (x) | Chibagasaki; J3e 7–0 (x) |
| 1915 | Iwakiyama^{†} J2w 5–1 (x) | Genjiyama^{†} J4e 6–0–1d (x) |
| 1914 | Ryōgoku; J2e 7–0–1d (x) | Ōnishiki; J3e 7–0 (x) |
| 1913 | Yamadagawa; J4e 7–0–1a (x) | Kashozan; J3w 6–2 (x) |
| 1912 | Kanenohana^{†} J1e 5–0–1d (x) | Uranohama^{†} J7w 5–0–1a (x) |
| 1911 | Ishiyama; J4w 5–2 (x) | Sakuragawa; J2e 6–1–3d (x) |
| 1910 | Noshirogata I J5w 5–1–1d (x) | Tosanoura; J9w 6–1 (x) |
| 1909 | see below | Hakkuniyama^{†} J4w 6–1 (x) |

- Any tournaments predating the second tournament of 1909 did not recognize or award a championship as the yūshō system giving the wrestler with the best tournament record a prize was first introduced by the Mainichi newspaper only in the second half of 1909, and later officially integrated by the JSA in 1926.
- All tournaments were held in Tokyo with the following exceptions: 1918 and 1919, all four in Osaka; Spring 1924 in Nagoya.
- All tournaments were held in either January or May with the following exceptions: Spring 1911 and 1923 in February; Summer 1909, 1910, 1911, 1914 and 1915 in June.

== See also ==
- List of active sumo wrestlers
- List of past sumo wrestlers
- List of sumo top division champions
- List of sumo top division runners-up
- List of active special prize winners
- List of sumo record holders
- List of years in sumo
- Glossary of sumo terms
