= Iwashita =

Iwashita (written: 岩下 or 岩月) is a Japanese surname. Notable people with the surname include:

- Daniel Iwashita Aquino, member of the Northern Mariana Islands House of Representatives
- Eiichi Iwashita (岩下 栄一; 1955–1999), Japanese sumo wrestler
- Jun Iwashita (岩下 潤; born 1973), Japanese footballer
- Keisuke Iwashita (岩下 敬輔; born 1986), Japanese footballer
- Marina Keiko Pieroni Iwashita (岩下 吉久; born 1982), Brazilian researcher
- Satsuo Iwashita (岩下 察男; born 1941), Japanese long-distance runner
- Shima Iwashita (岩下 志麻; born 1941), Japanese actress
- Yoshihisa Iwashita (岩下 吉久; born 1949), Japanese golfer
