= Tochimatoi Yuko =

Japanese sumo wrestler (1959–2012)

Personal information
- Native name: 栃纒 勇光
- Born: Yuji Imai; January 30, 1959 Kawasaki, Kanagawa, Japan
- Died: January 7, 2012 (aged 52)
- Height: 1.79 m (5 ft 10 1/2 in)
- Weight: 179 kg (395 lb; 28.2 st)

Sport
- Sport: Sumo
- Retired: March, 1989
- Heya: Kasugano
- Record: 405-385-13
- Debut: January, 1975
- Highest rank: Maegashira 11 (March, 1986)
- Championships: 1 (Jūryō)
- Updated on Sep. 2012

Tochimatoi Yuko (born Yuji Imai; January 30, 1959 – January 7, 2012) was a sumo wrestler from Kawasaki, Kanagawa, Japan. He made his professional debut in September January 1975, and reached the top division in May 1985. His highest rank was maegashira 11. He retired in March 1989.

== Career record ==
Tochimatoi Yuko
Year	January Hatsu basho, Tokyo	March Haru basho, Osaka	May Natsu basho, Tokyo	July Nagoya basho, Nagoya	September Aki basho, Tokyo	November Kyūshū basho, Fukuoka
1975	(Maezumo)	East Jonokuchi #20; 3–4	East Jonidan #108; 3–4	West Jonidan #114; 5–2	East Jonidan #77; 4–3	West Jonidan #53; 3–4
1976	West Jonidan #69; 6–1	West Sandanme #77; 3–4	East Jonidan #3; 3–4	West Jonidan #19; 6–1	East Sandanme #56; 3–4	West Sandanme #69; 6–1
1977	West Sandanme #22; 5–2	West Makushita #54; 3–4	West Sandanme #5; 4–3	East Makushita #50; 3–4	West Sandanme #1; 3–4	East Sandanme #10; 2–5
1978	West Sandanme #33; 4–3	East Sandanme #21; 5–2	West Makushita #53; 4–3	West Makushita #42; 4–3	East Makushita #31; 5–2	West Makushita #16; 4–3
1979	West Makushita #69; 4–3	East Makushita #77; 2–5	West Makushita #3; 2–5	West Makushita #19; 5–2	West Makushita #56; 3–4	West Makushita #69; 3–4
1980	West Makushita #42; 6–1	West Makushita #15; 5–2	West Makushita #5; 1–6	East Makushita #27; 3–4	West Makushita #35; 5–2	West Makushita #21; 5–2
1981	West Makushita #9; 3–4	East Makushita #14; 4–3	East Makushita #8; 3–4	East Makushita #13; 6–1–P	West Makushita #3; 4–3	East Makushita #1; 4–3
1982	West Jūryō #10; 3–6–6	West Makushita #7; Sat out due to injury 0–0–7	West Makushita #7; 1–6	East Makushita #30; 5–2	East Makushita #16; 3–4	East Makushita #25; 4–3
1983	West Makushita #17; 5–2	West Makushita #7; 3–4	West Makushita #16; 6–1	West Makushita #2; 5–2	West Jūryō #11; 2–13	East Makushita #9; 3–4
1984	West Makushita #17; 5–2	East Makushita #10; 5–2	West Makushita #4; 5–2	West Jūryō #12; 10–5	West Jūryō #4; 7–8	East Jūryō #6; 9–6
1985	East Jūryō #4; 9–6	East Jūryō #1; 10–5	West Maegashira #12; 6–9	West Jūryō #3; 8–7	West Jūryō #2; 6–9	West Jūryō #8; 9–6
1986	West Jūryō #3; 11–4–P	East Maegashira #11; 1–14	West Jūryō #9; 6–9	West Jūryō #13; 8–7	East Jūryō #10; 7–8	East Jūryō #12; 8–7
1987	East Jūryō #10; 10–5–P; Champion	East Jūryō #4; 8–7	East Jūryō #3; 7–8	East Jūryō #5; 8–7	East Jūryō #3; 6–9	East Jūryō #7; 6–9
1988	West Jūryō #11; 8–7	East Jūryō #8; 6–9	West Jūryō #11; 3–12	East Makushita #8; 3–4	West Makushita #14; 3–4	East Makushita #23; 4–3
1989	West Makushita #15; 3–4	East Makushita #21; Retired; 1–6	x	x	x	x
Record given as wins–losses–absences Top division champion Top division runner-up Retired Lower divisions Non-participation Sanshō key: F=Fighting spirit; O=Outstanding performance; T=Technique Also shown: ★=Kinboshi; P=Playoff(s); Divisions: Makuuchi — Jūryō — Makushita — Sandanme — Jonidan — Jonokuchi Makuuchi ranks: Yokozuna — Ōzeki — Sekiwake — Komusubi — Maegashira

== See also ==
- Glossary of sumo terms
- List of past sumo wrestlers
- List of sumo tournament second division champions
