= Hanahikari Setsuo =

Former Japanese sumo wrestler

Personal information
- Native name: 花光 節夫
- Born: Setsuo Endo; 21 June 1940 (age 86) Matsuo, Iwate, Japan
- Height: 1.78 m (5 ft 10 in)
- Weight: 125 kg (276 lb)

Sport
- Sport: Sumo
- Retired: September, 1970
- Heya: Hanakago
- Record: 462-435-17
- Debut: May, 1958
- Highest rank: Maegashira 3 (January, 1968)
- Elder name: Ōtake
- Championships: 1 (Jūryō); 1 (Sandanme); 1 (Jonokuchi)
- Gold Stars: 1 (Kashiwado)
- Updated on June 2020

Hanahikari Setsuo (born 21 June 1940 as Setsuo Endo) is a former sumo wrestler from Matsuo, Iwate, Japan. He made his professional debut in May 1958 and reached the top division in November 1965. His highest rank was maegashira 3. Upon retirement from active competition he became an elder in the Japan Sumo Association under the name Ōtake. He left the Sumo Association in May 1975.

== Career record ==
Hanahikari Setsuo
Year	January Hatsu basho, Tokyo	March Haru basho, Osaka	May Natsu basho, Tokyo	July Nagoya basho, Nagoya	September Aki basho, Tokyo	November Kyūshū basho, Fukuoka
1958	x	x	(Maezumo)	East Jonokuchi #6; 8–0; Champion	East Jonidan #37; 5–3	West Jonidan #18; 6–2
1959	East Sandanme #102; 2–6	East Jonidan #5; 6–2	East Sandanme #82; 5–3	East Sandanme #69; 4–4	East Sandanme #66; 7–1	East Sandanme #25; 8–0; Champion
1960	West Makushita #53; 4–4	East Makushita #47; 3–5	East Makushita #53; 4–4	West Makushita #50; 6–1	West Makushita #31; 5–2	East Makushita #23; 3–4
1961	West Makushita #28; 4–3	East Makushita #21; 5–2	East Makushita #13; 3–4	West Makushita #14; 3–4	East Makushita #19; 4–3	East Makushita #13; 4–3
1962	West Makushita #10; 3–4	West Makushita #13; 4–3	East Makushita #9; 6–1	East Makushita #2; 6–1	East Jūryō #14; 8–7	East Jūryō #11; 8–7
1963	East Jūryō #6; 12–3	East Jūryō #1; 8–7	East Jūryō #1; 6–9	West Jūryō #3; 6–9	East Jūryō #5; 7–8	East Jūryō #6; 9–6
1964	East Jūryō #1; 5–10	East Jūryō #6; 7–8	East Jūryō #7; 8–7	East Jūryō #6; 7–8	East Jūryō #7; 5–10	East Jūryō #13; 12–3
1965	East Jūryō #5; 11–4	East Jūryō #2; 5–10	East Jūryō #6; 8–7	East Jūryō #4; 7–8	West Jūryō #5; 12–3; Champion	East Maegashira #14; 8–7
1966	East Maegashira #14; 9–6	West Maegashira #10; 9–6	East Maegashira #7; 5–10	West Maegashira #12; 7–8	East Maegashira #13; 4–11	West Jūryō #3; 12–3
1967	West Maegashira #11; 8–7	West Maegashira #8; 8–7	West Maegashira #5; 6–9	West Maegashira #6; 6–9	West Maegashira #9; 7–8	West Maegashira #9; 9–6
1968	East Maegashira #3; 5–10	West Maegashira #8; 9–6	West Maegashira #3; 7–8 ★	West Maegashira #3; 4–11	West Maegashira #8; 8–7	West Maegashira #6; 6–9
1969	East Maegashira #9; 6–9	East Maegashira #11; 9–6	East Maegashira #5; 6–9	West Maegashira #9; 7–8	East Maegashira #10; 7–8	East Maegashira #11; 8–7
1970	East Maegashira #7; 2–13	East Jūryō #3; 0–5–10	West Jūryō #13; 9–6	West Jūryō #7; 2–13	West Makushita #7; Retired; 0–0–7	x
Record given as wins–losses–absences Top division champion Top division runner-up Retired Lower divisions Non-participation Sanshō key: F=Fighting spirit; O=Outstanding performance; T=Technique Also shown: ★=Kinboshi; P=Playoff(s); Divisions: Makuuchi — Jūryō — Makushita — Sandanme — Jonidan — Jonokuchi Makuuchi ranks: Yokozuna — Ōzeki — Sekiwake — Komusubi — Maegashira

== See also ==
- Glossary of sumo terms
- List of past sumo wrestlers
- List of sumo tournament second division champions
