= Niigiyama Tadashi =

Sumo wrestler

Personal information
- Native name: 新岐山 正
- Born: Tadashi Nagano; January 5, 1940 Gifu, Japan
- Died: September 5, 1986 (aged 46)
- Height: 1.77 m (5 ft 9 1/2 in)
- Weight: 142 kg (313 lb; 22.4 st)

Sport
- Sport: Sumo
- Retired: May, 1963
- Heya: Tokitsukaze
- Record: 229-205-43
- Debut: March, 1955
- Highest rank: Maegashira 11 (May, 1962)
- Championships: 2 (Jūryō); 1 (Makushita)
- Updated on Sep. 2012

Niigiyama Tadashi (born Tadashi Nagano; January 5, 1940 - September 5, 1986) was a sumo wrestler from Gifu, Japan. He made his professional debut in March 1955, and reached the top division in March 1961. He left the sumo world upon retirement from active competition in May 1963.

== Career record ==
- The Kyushu tournament was first held in 1957, and the Nagoya tournament in 1958.

Niigiyama Tadashi
Year	January Hatsu basho, Tokyo	March Haru basho, Osaka	May Natsu basho, Tokyo	July Nagoya basho, Nagoya	September Aki basho, Tokyo	November Kyūshū basho, Fukuoka
1955	x	(Maezumo)	West Jonokuchi #18; 4–4	Not held	West Jonidan #92; 3–5	Not held
1956	East Jonidan #90; 3–5	West Jonidan #96; 3–5	East Jonidan #93; 0–1–7	Not held	East Jonokuchi #2; 5–3	Not held
1957	East Jonidan #72; 4–4	West Jonidan #61; 6–2	East Jonidan #10; 6–2	Not held	West Sandanme #70; 3–5	East Sandanme #76; 5–3
1958	East Sandanme #62; 7–1–P	West Sandanme #21; 5–3	East Sandanme #12; 4–4	East Sandanme #9; 0–0–8	East Sandanme #30; 5–3	East Sandanme #20; 3–5
1959	East Sandanme #29; 5–3	East Sandanme #16; 7–1	East Makushita #78; 5–3	West Makushita #65; 6–2	West Makushita #55; 5–3	East Makushita #44; 8–0; Champion
1960	West Makushita #5; 4–4	West Makushita #1; 5–3	East Jūryō #17; 8–7	West Jūryō #16; 7–8	West Jūryō #16; 12–3–P; Champion	East Jūryō #3; 8–7
1961	West Jūryō #2; 11–4–P	East Maegashira #12; 6–8–1	West Maegashira #14; 3–12	West Jūryō #5; 5–10	West Jūryō #7; 5–10	West Jūryō #12; 10–5
1962	West Jūryō #3; 12–3; Champion	West Maegashira #12; 7–8	East Maegashira #11; 6–9	East Maegashira #14; Sat out due to injury 0–0–15	East Jūryō #8; 3–12	West Jūryō #18; 10–5
1963	West Jūryō #6; 1–9–5	East Jūryō #18; 4–11	East Makushita #5; Retired; 0–0–7			
Record given as wins–losses–absences Top division champion Top division runner-up Retired Lower divisions Non-participation Sanshō key: F=Fighting spirit; O=Outstanding performance; T=Technique Also shown: ★=Kinboshi; P=Playoff(s); Divisions: Makuuchi — Jūryō — Makushita — Sandanme — Jonidan — Jonokuchi Makuuchi ranks: Yokozuna — Ōzeki — Sekiwake — Komusubi — Maegashira

== See also ==
- Glossary of sumo terms
- List of past sumo wrestlers
- List of sumo tournament second division champions
