= Maruyama Takahiko =

Sumo wrestler

Personal information
- Native name: 丸山 孝彦
- Born: Takahiko Maruyama; 14 November 1946 (age 79) Katsuyama, Fukuoka, Japan
- Height: 1.83 m (6 ft 0 in)
- Weight: 114 kg (251 lb)

Sport
- Sport: Sumo
- Retired: September, 1976
- Heya: Tokitsukaze
- Record: 401-368-26
- Debut: May, 1962
- Highest rank: Maegashira 13 (July, 1973)
- Championships: 1 (Jūryō); 1 (Makushita)
- Updated on Sep. 2012

Takahiko Maruyama (born 14 November 1946) is a former sumo wrestler from Katsuyama, Fukuoka, Japan. His highest rank was maegashira 13. He made his professional debut in May 1962 and reached the top division in May 1973. He had been injured during the previous tournament, withdrawing on Day 13 a day after getting his kachi-koshi or majority of wins. He was awarded kosho seido status for the next tournament, meaning he could miss it without effect on his rank. This made him not only the first wrestler ever to be awarded kosho status but also the first to obtain it in his top division debut. He entered the following tournament in July but scored only four wins against eleven losses and was demoted. He had one more tournament in makuuchi nearly three years later, in January 1976. He left the sumo world upon retirement from active competition in September 1976.

== Career record ==
Maruyama Takahiko
| Year | January Hatsu basho, Tokyo | March Haru basho, Osaka | May Natsu basho, Tokyo | July Nagoya basho, Nagoya | September Aki basho, Tokyo | November Kyūshū basho, Fukuoka |
|---|---|---|---|---|---|---|
| 1962 | x | x | (Maezumo) | (Maezumo) | East Jonokuchi #14; 4–3 | East Jonidan #76; 5–2 |
| 1963 | West Jonidan #33; 3–4 | East Jonidan #57; 4–3 | East Jonidan #23; 4–3 | West Sandanme #88; 3–4 | West Jonidan #1; 3–4 | West Jonidan #16; 6–1 |
| 1964 | West Sandanme #68; 4–3 | East Sandanme #58; 6–1 | East Sandanme #21; 3–4 | East Sandanme #22; 5–2 | West Makushita #95; 6–1 | West Makushita #61; 4–3 |
| 1965 | East Makushita #56; 5–2 | East Makushita #39; 3–4 | East Makushita #47; 2–5 | West Makushita #60; 4–3 | West Makushita #56; 3–4 | West Makushita #65; 4–3 |
| 1966 | East Makushita #60; 3–4 | West Makushita #64; 3–4 | West Makushita #68; 3–4 | East Makushita #79; 4–3 | East Makushita #68; 3–4 | West Makushita #80; 5–2 |
| 1967 | West Makushita #61; 4–3 | West Makushita #52; 3–4 | East Sandanme #7; 5–2 | East Makushita #43; 2–5 | West Sandanme #2; 3–4 | West Sandanme #9; 5–2 |
| 1968 | West Makushita #45; 2–5 | West Sandanme #3; 4–3 | East Makushita #54; 3–4 | East Makushita #60; 5–2 | West Makushita #37; 6–1 | East Makushita #13; 3–4 |
| 1969 | West Makushita #15; 5–2 | West Makushita #6; 3–4 | East Makushita #9; 3–4 | West Makushita #12; 5–2 | West Makushita #3; 3–4 | West Makushita #6; 2–5 |
| 1970 | East Makushita #18; 4–3 | West Makushita #14; 3–4 | East Makushita #18; 6–1 | West Makushita #4; 7–0–P | East Jūryō #10; 9–6 | East Jūryō #6; 7–8 |
| 1971 | West Jūryō #9; 7–8 | West Jūryō #13; 4–11 | West Makushita #8; 2–5 | East Makushita #22; 4–3 | East Makushita #20; 6–1 | East Makushita #6; 4–3 |
| 1972 | East Makushita #3; 2–5 | West Makushita #14; 5–2 | West Makushita #6; 5–2 | East Makushita #2; 4–3 | East Jūryō #12; 9–6 | West Jūryō #7; 6–9 |
| 1973 | West Jūryō #9; 11–4; Champion | East Jūryō #1; 8–5–2 | East Maegashira #14; Sat out due to injury 0–0–15 | East Maegashira #13; 4–11 | East Jūryō #6; 6–9 | West Jūryō #11; 8–7 |
| 1974 | West Jūryō #9; 3–12 | West Makushita #6; 1–6 | East Makushita #30; 6–1 | West Makushita #8; 7–0–P; Champion | East Jūryō #12; 8–7 | East Jūryō #10; 8–7 |
| 1975 | East Jūryō #8; 9–6 | East Jūryō #3; 9–6 | East Jūryō #1; 3–12 | East Jūryō #12; 8–7 | East Jūryō #11; 10–5 | West Jūryō #5; 11–4 |
| 1976 | East Maegashira #13; 4–9–2 | West Jūryō #3; 5–10 | East Jūryō #9; 7–8 | West Jūryō #11; 3–12 | East Makushita #11; Retired; 0–0–7 | x |
Record given as wins–losses–absences Top division champion Top division runner-up Retired Lower divisions Non-participation Sanshō key: F=Fighting spirit; O=Outstanding performance; T=Technique Also shown: ★=Kinboshi; P=Playoff(s); Divisions: Makuuchi — Jūryō — Makushita — Sandanme — Jonidan — Jonokuchi Makuuchi ranks: Yokozuna — Ōzeki — Sekiwake — Komusubi — Maegashira

== See also ==
- Glossary of sumo terms
- List of past sumo wrestlers
- List of sumo tournament second division champions
