= Taikō Yoshio =

Japanese sumo wrestler

Personal information
- Native name: 大觥 吉男
- Born: Yoshio Yokoyama; 30 October 1953 (age 72) Aomori, Japan
- Height: 1.74 m (5 ft 8 1/2 in)
- Weight: 125 kg (276 lb)

Sport
- Sport: Sumo
- Retired: November, 1980
- Heya: Futagoyama
- Record: 350-326-4
- Debut: November, 1968
- Highest rank: Maegashira 8 (July, 1978)
- Championships: 2 (Jūryō)
- Updated on Sep. 2012

Taikō Yoshio (born 30 October 1953 as Yoshio Yokoyama) is a former sumo wrestler from Aomori, Japan. He made his professional debut in November 1968, and reached the top division in May 1978. His highest rank was maegashira 2. He left the sumo world upon retirement in November 1980.

== Career record ==
Taikō Yoshio
Year	January Hatsu basho, Tokyo	March Haru basho, Osaka	May Natsu basho, Tokyo	July Nagoya basho, Nagoya	September Aki basho, Tokyo	November Kyūshū basho, Fukuoka
1968	x	x	x	x	x	(Maezumo)
1969	East Jonokuchi #9; 3–4	West Jonidan #78; 4–3	East Jonidan #52; 4–3	West Jonidan #30; 3–4	West Jonidan #39; 6–1	West Sandanme #90; 3–4
1970	West Jonidan #3; 4–3	East Sandanme #84; 5–2	West Sandanme #58; 4–3	West Sandanme #35; 5–2	East Sandanme #16; 5–2	West Makushita #54; 2–5
1971	East Sandanme #11; 5–2	East Makushita #53; 3–4	West Sandanme #2; 4–3	West Makushita #54; 3–4	West Sandanme #7; 5–2	West Makushita #42; 4–3
1972	West Makushita #37; 4–3	West Makushita #31; 3–4	West Makushita #37; 5–2	East Makushita #22; 3–4	East Makushita #30; 2–5	East Makushita #48; 5–2
1973	West Makushita #28; 4–3	West Makushita #24; 5–2	East Makushita #12; 3–4	West Makushita #16; 4–3	East Makushita #12; 3–4	West Makushita #17; 2–5
1974	East Makushita #37; 3–4	East Makushita #44; 5–2	East Makushita #25; 2–5	East Makushita #39; 6–1	West Makushita #14; 4–2–1	West Makushita #11; 5–2
1975	East Makushita #7; 5–2	West Makushita #3; 4–3	East Makushita #2; 4–3	West Jūryō #13; 10–5	West Jūryō #7; 1–14	East Makushita #8; 5–2
1976	East Makushita #4; 2–5	West Makushita #14; 5–2	East Makushita #4; 3–4	West Makushita #8; 4–3	East Makushita #6; 3–4	West Makushita #11; 4–3
1977	East Makushita #8; 3–4	East Makushita #14; 5–2	East Makushita #7; 6–1–P	West Jūryō #12; 8–7	West Jūryō #11; 8–7	East Jūryō #9; 8–7
1978	West Jūryō #7; 9–6	East Jūryō #2; 11–4–P; Champion	West Maegashira #11; 8–7	West Maegashira #8; 6–9	West Maegashira #11; 4–11	West Jūryō #8; 8–7
1979	East Jūryō #6; 8–7	West Jūryō #3; 9–6	East Maegashira #13; 6–9	West Jūryō #2; 8–7	East Jūryō #1; 6–9	West Jūryō #5; 6–9
1980	East Jūryō #10; 11–4; Champion	West Jūryō #3; 8–7	West Jūryō #1; 7–8	East Jūryō #3; 4–11	East Jūryō #12; 3–9–3	West Makushita #11; Retired; 0–7
Record given as wins–losses–absences Top division champion Top division runner-up Retired Lower divisions Non-participation Sanshō key: F=Fighting spirit; O=Outstanding performance; T=Technique Also shown: ★=Kinboshi; P=Playoff(s); Divisions: Makuuchi — Jūryō — Makushita — Sandanme — Jonidan — Jonokuchi Makuuchi ranks: Yokozuna — Ōzeki — Sekiwake — Komusubi — Maegashira

== See also ==
- Glossary of sumo terms
- List of past sumo wrestlers
- List of sumo tournament second division champions
