= Tochiizumi Takayuki =

Japanese sumo wrestler

Personal information
- Native name: 栃泉 隆幸
- Born: Takayuki Nakayama; 26 November 1959 (age 66) Izumisano, Osaka, Japan
- Height: 1.87 m (6 ft 1 1/2 in)
- Weight: 140 kg (310 lb)

Sport
- Sport: Sumo
- Retired: March, 1990
- Heya: Kasugano
- Record: 343-324-8
- Debut: January, 1975
- Highest rank: Jūryō 3 (September, 1983)
- Championships: 1 (Jūryō)
- Updated on Sep. 2012

Tochiizumi Takayuki (born 26 November 1959 as Takayuki Nakayama) is a former sumo wrestler from Izumisano, Osaka, Japan. He made his professional debut in January 1975, but never reached the top division. His highest rank was jūryō 3. He left the sumo world upon retirement from active competition in March 1990.

== Career record ==
Tochiizumi Takayuki
Year	January Hatsu basho, Tokyo	March Haru basho, Osaka	May Natsu basho, Tokyo	July Nagoya basho, Nagoya	September Aki basho, Tokyo	November Kyūshū basho, Fukuoka
1975	(Maezumo)	West Jonokuchi #16; 2–5	East Jonidan #111; 3–4	West Jonidan #115; 3–4	West Jonidan #120; 4–3	West Jonidan #88; 4–3
1976	East Jonidan #62; 4–3	West Jonidan #42; 2–5	West Jonidan #62; 4–3	West Jonidan #37; 2–5	West Jonidan #62; 5–2	West Jonidan #27; 4–3
1977	East Jonidan #5; 3–4	East Jonidan #17; 2–5	West Jonidan #41; 3–4	West Jonidan #53; 4–3	East Jonidan #36; 4–3	East Jonidan #15; 4–3
1978	West Jonidan #1; 5–2	East Sandanme #54; 3–4	East Sandanme #64; 5–2	East Sandanme #35; 3–4	West Sandanme #48; 4–3	West Sandanme #32; 5–2
1979	West Sandanme #12; 5–2	West Makushita #50; 4–3	East Makushita #42; 4–3	East Makushita #34; 2–5	West Makushita #57; 4–3	East Makushita #46; 5–2
1980	West Makushita #25; 2–5	West Makushita #43; 2–5	East Sandanme #9; 5–2	East Makushita #44; 4–3	West Makushita #33; 2–5	West Makushita #55; 6–1
1981	West Makushita #26; 5–2	West Makushita #16; 3–4	West Makushita #23; 1–6	West Makushita #45; 5–2	East Makushita #28; 3–4	East Makushita #35; 5–2
1982	West Makushita #18; 5–2	East Makushita #8; 4–3	East Makushita #6; 3–4	West Makushita #11; 5–2	West Makushita #5; 6–1	West Jūryō #12; 5–10
1983	West Makushita #4; 4–3	East Makushita #3; 6–1	East Jūryō #12; 11–4–P; Champion	West Jūryō #4; 8–7	East Jūryō #3; 4–11	East Jūryō #10; 3–12
1984	West Makushita #6; 4–3	East Makushita #4; 1–6	East Makushita #30; 5–2	West Makushita #15; 4–3	East Makushita #13; 5–2	East Makushita #6; 4–3
1985	East Makushita #3; 3–4	West Makushita #9; 3–4	East Makushita #16; 4–3	West Makushita #11; 4–3	West Makushita #6; 2–5	East Makushita #21; 3–4
1986	East Makushita #31; 4–3	West Makushita #20; 5–2	East Makushita #12; 0–5–2	West Makushita #47; 5–2	East Makushita #24; 3–4	East Makushita #33; 2–5
1987	West Makushita #56; 6–1–P	West Makushita #29; 1–6	East Sandanme #2; 4–3	West Makushita #50; 3–4	West Sandanme #2; 5–2	West Makushita #40; 2–5
1988	East Sandanme #9; 5–2	West Makushita #47; 5–2	East Makushita #31; 3–3–1	East Makushita #43; 4–3	East Makushita #32; 3–4	East Makushita #43; 4–3
1989	West Makushita #34; 4–3	West Makushita #25; 1–6	East Makushita #54; 5–2	East Makushita #35; 4–3	East Makushita #25; 3–4	West Makushita #35; 3–4
1990	West Makushita #44; 4–3	East Makushita #34; Retired; 0–0–7	x	x	x	x
Record given as wins–losses–absences Top division champion Top division runner-up Retired Lower divisions Non-participation Sanshō key: F=Fighting spirit; O=Outstanding performance; T=Technique Also shown: ★=Kinboshi; P=Playoff(s); Divisions: Makuuchi — Jūryō — Makushita — Sandanme — Jonidan — Jonokuchi Makuuchi ranks: Yokozuna — Ōzeki — Sekiwake — Komusubi — Maegashira

== See also ==
- Glossary of sumo terms
- List of past sumo wrestlers
- List of sumo tournament second division champions
