= Kotochitose Kosei =

Japanese sumo wrestler

Personal information
- Native name: 琴千歳 幸征
- Born: Minoru Yamamoto; 22 April 1957 (age 69) Chitose, Hokkaidō, Japan
- Height: 1.82 m (5 ft 11 1/2 in)
- Weight: 137 kg (302 lb)

Sport
- Sport: Sumo
- Retired: July, 1986
- Heya: Sadogatake
- Record: 440-424-43
- Debut: July, 1971
- Highest rank: Maegashira 5 (September, 1981)
- Championships: 2 (Jūryō)
- Updated on Sep. 2012

Kotochitose Kosei (born 22 April 1957 as Minoru Yamamoto) is a former sumo wrestler from Chitose, Hokkaidō, Japan. In July 1971, he made his professional debut and he reached the top division in May 1981. His highest rank was maegashira 5. He retired from active competition in July 1986. He became a wakaimonogashira (assistant) at Sadogatake stable after his retirement.

== Career record ==
Kotochitose Kosei
Year	January Hatsu basho, Tokyo	March Haru basho, Osaka	May Natsu basho, Tokyo	July Nagoya basho, Nagoya	September Aki basho, Tokyo	November Kyūshū basho, Fukuoka
1971	x	x	x	(Maezumo)	East Jonokuchi #12; 4–3	East Jonidan #79; 2–2
1972	West Jonidan #68; 2–1	West Jonidan #41; Sat out due to injury 0–0–7	West Jonidan #41; 1–2	East Jonidan #52; Sat out due to injury 0–0–7	East Jonidan #51; 2–1	West Jonidan #35; Sat out due to injury 0–0–7
1973	West Jonidan #35; 1–2	West Jonidan #48; 5–2	East Jonidan #17; 6–1	East Sandanme #54; 2–5	East Sandanme #78; 5–2	West Sandanme #45; 3–4
1974	East Sandanme #58; 5–2	East Sandanme #34; 3–4	East Sandanme #51; 3–4	West Sandanme #60; 6–1	West Sandanme #14; 1–6	West Sandanme #39; 5–2
1975	East Sandanme #15; 5–2	West Makushita #52; 4–3	West Makushita #43; 3–4	West Makushita #53; 3–4	East Sandanme #5; 3–4	East Sandanme #16; 5–2
1976	East Makushita #52; 4–3	East Makushita #43; 4–3	East Makushita #35; 6–1	East Makushita #15; 3–4	West Makushita #22; 3–4	West Makushita #27; 3–4
1977	West Makushita #39; 4–3	East Makushita #30; 4–3	East Makushita #22; 5–2	East Makushita #10; 3–4	East Makushita #16; 3–4	East Makushita #24; 5–2
1978	West Makushita #12; 4–3	West Makushita #7; 3–4	West Makushita #14; 4–3	East Makushita #11; 5–2	West Makushita #4; 2–5	West Makushita #19; 4–3
1979	West Makushita #15; 5–2	West Makushita #3; 3–4	West Makushita #8; 5–2	East Makushita #2; 5–2	West Jūryō #11; 10–5–PP; Champion	West Jūryō #4; 7–8
1980	West Jūryō #5; 8–7	West Jūryō #4; 7–8	West Jūryō #7; 9–6	East Jūryō #2; 8–7	East Jūryō #1; 6–9	East Jūryō #6; 6–9
1981	East Jūryō #8; 10–5	East Jūryō #1; 8–7	West Maegashira #13; 9–6	East Maegashira #10; 8–7	East Maegashira #5; 6–9	East Maegashira #8; 4–11
1982	East Jūryō #2; 4–11	East Jūryō #10; 9–6	East Jūryō #6; 5–10	East Jūryō #12; 6–9	West Makushita #2; 5–2	West Jūryō #11; 9–6
1983	East Jūryō #4; 7–8	West Jūryō #6; 10–5	West Jūryō #1; 5–10	West Jūryō #7; 7–8	West Jūryō #9; 8–7	West Jūryō #5; 8–7
1984	East Jūryō #2; 7–8	East Jūryō #4; 10–5	East Maegashira #14; 5–10	East Jūryō #6; 6–9	West Jūryō #8; 7–8	West Jūryō #10; 11–4–PP
1985	East Jūryō #5; 6–9	West Jūryō #7; Sat out due to injury 0–0–15	West Jūryō #7; 6–9	East Jūryō #10; 8–7	East Jūryō #9; 8–7	East Jūryō #7; 2–13
1986	West Makushita #5; 3–4	West Makushita #12; 4–3	East Makushita #7; 2–5	West Makushita #22; Retired; 0–0–7	x	x
Record given as wins–losses–absences Top division champion Top division runner-up Retired Lower divisions Non-participation Sanshō key: F=Fighting spirit; O=Outstanding performance; T=Technique Also shown: ★=Kinboshi; P=Playoff(s); Divisions: Makuuchi — Jūryō — Makushita — Sandanme — Jonidan — Jonokuchi Makuuchi ranks: Yokozuna — Ōzeki — Sekiwake — Komusubi — Maegashira

== See also ==
- Glossary of sumo terms
- List of past sumo wrestlers
- List of sumo tournament second division champions
