= Tokibayama Toshio =

Japanese sumo wrestler (1944–1995)

Personal information
- Native name: 時葉山 敏夫
- Born: Toshio Haruki; May 5, 1944 Nanao, Ishikawa, Japan
- Died: September 20, 1995 (aged 51)
- Height: 1.78 m (5 ft 10 in)
- Weight: 120 kg (260 lb; 19 st)

Sport
- Sport: Sumo
- Retired: March, 1975
- Heya: Tokitsukaze
- Record: 523-533-7
- Debut: September, 1959
- Highest rank: Maegashira 2 (September, 1968)
- Elder name: Fujigane
- Championships: 2 (Jūryō); 1 (Makushita); 1 (Jonidan)
- Updated on June 2020

Tokibayama Toshio (born Toshio Haruki; May 5, 1944 - September 20, 1995) was a sumo wrestler from Nanao, Ishikawa, Japan. He made his professional debut in May 1961, and reached the top division in September 1967. Upon retirement from active competition he became an elder in the Japan Sumo Association under the name Fujigane. He died while an active oyakata.

== Career record ==
Tokibayama Toshio
| Year | January Hatsu basho, Tokyo | March Haru basho, Osaka | May Natsu basho, Tokyo | July Nagoya basho, Nagoya | September Aki basho, Tokyo | November Kyūshū basho, Fukuoka |
|---|---|---|---|---|---|---|
| 1959 | x | x | x | x | (Maezumo) | West Jonokuchi #18; 6–2 |
| 1960 | East Jonidan #125; 6–2 | West Jonidan #73; 6–2 | East Jonidan #30; 3–5 | East Jonidan #37; 5–2 | East Sandanme #107; 3–4 | West Jonidan #17; 5–2 |
| 1961 | East Sandanme #98; 3–4 | West Sandanme #112; 4–3 | West Sandanme #81; 3–4 | East Sandanme #93; 1–6 | West Jonidan #1; 7–0; Champion | West Sandanme #21; 4–3 |
| 1962 | West Sandanme #9; 2–5 | East Sandanme #17; 4–3 | West Sandanme #8; 2–2–3 | East Sandanme #20; 4–3 | West Sandanme #11; 5–2 | West Makushita #85; 4–3 |
| 1963 | West Makushita #75; 3–4 | East Makushita #84; 4–3 | West Makushita #76; 4–3 | East Makushita #68; 7–0; Champion | West Makushita #2; 2–5 | East Makushita #8; 3–4 |
| 1964 | West Makushita #11; 3–4 | West Makushita #13; 3–4 | West Makushita #16; 4–3 | East Makushita #13; 3–4 | East Makushita #16; 5–2 | East Makushita #8; 2–5 |
| 1965 | West Makushita #17; 4–3 | West Makushita #11; 5–2 | East Makushita #4; 4–3 | East Makushita #3; 2–5 | East Makushita #11; 4–3 | East Makushita #8; 5–2 |
| 1966 | West Makushita #3; 4–3 | East Makushita #3; 5–2 | East Makushita #2; 5–2 | West Jūryō #17; 8–7 | West Jūryō #16; 8–7 | East Jūryō #11; 6–9 |
| 1967 | West Jūryō #16; 9–6 | East Jūryō #10; 9–6 | East Jūryō #9; 9–6 | East Jūryō #5; 10–5 | East Maegashira #12; 6–9 | West Jūryō #1; 9–6 |
| 1968 | East Maegashira #10; 9–6 | East Maegashira #5; 4–11 | West Maegashira #10; 8–7 | West Maegashira #6; 9–6 | East Maegashira #2; 4–11 | West Maegashira #8; 7–8 |
| 1969 | East Maegashira #10; 8–7 | East Maegashira #8; 10–5 | East Maegashira #3; 4–9–2 | East Maegashira #9; 6–9 | West Maegashira #11; 6–9 | West Jūryō #1; 10–5 |
| 1970 | East Maegashira #11; 8–7 | West Maegashira #8; 10–5 | West Maegashira #3; 3–12 | East Maegashira #11; 8–7 | East Maegashira #5; 5–10 | West Maegashira #8; 8–7 |
| 1971 | West Maegashira #4; 6–9 | East Maegashira #6; 7–8 | East Maegashira #8; 8–7 | East Maegashira #4; 6–9 | West Maegashira #7; 8–7 | East Maegashira #5; 5–10 |
| 1972 | East Maegashira #9; 9–6 | East Maegashira #6; 7–8 | East Maegashira #9; 9–6 | West Maegashira #4; 5–10 | West Maegashira #9; 8–7 | East Maegashira #8; 6–9 |
| 1973 | West Maegashira #11; 8–7 | West Maegashira #8; 6–9 | West Maegashira #12; 9–6 | East Maegashira #7; 1–14 | East Jūryō #3; 5–10 | East Jūryō #11; 11–4; Champion |
| 1974 | East Jūryō #3; 9–6 | West Maegashira #12; 3–12 | West Jūryō #7; 12–3; Champion | West Maegashira #11; 3–12 | East Jūryō #5; 6–9 | West Jūryō #10; 2–13 |
| 1975 | East Makushita #8; 3–4 | West Makushita #13; Retired; 2–3–2 | | | | |
Record given as wins–losses–absences Top division champion Top division runner-up Retired Lower divisions Non-participation Sanshō key: F=Fighting spirit; O=Outstanding performance; T=Technique Also shown: ★=Kinboshi; P=Playoff(s); Divisions: Makuuchi — Jūryō — Makushita — Sandanme — Jonidan — Jonokuchi Makuuchi ranks: Yokozuna — Ōzeki — Sekiwake — Komusubi — Maegashira

== See also ==
- Glossary of sumo terms
- List of past sumo wrestlers
- List of sumo tournament second division champions
