= Tochiōyama Yūki =

Japanese sumo wrestler (1943–2001)

Tochiōyama Yuki
Personal information
- Native name: 栃王山 裕規
- Born: Shizuka Kamitani; March 1, 1943 Nagoya, Aichi, Japan
- Died: March 31, 2001 (aged 58)
- Height: 1.74 m (5 ft 8 1/2 in)
- Weight: 106 kg (234 lb)

Sport
- Sport: Sumo
- Retired: January, 1972
- Heya: Kasugano
- Record: 524-464-31
- Debut: November, 1958
- Highest rank: Maegashira 1 (January, 1969)
- Elder name: Kiyomigata
- Championships: 1 (Jūryō); 1 (Jonokuchi)
- Special Prizes: Fighting Spirit (1)
- Gold Stars: 2 (Sadanoyama, Kashiwado)
- Updated on June 2020

Tochiōyama Yuki (栃王山 裕規, Tochiōyama Yūki; born Shizuka Kamitani; March 1, 1943 - March 31, 2001) was a sumo wrestler from Nagoya, Aichi, Japan. He made his professional debut in November 1958 and reached the top division in March 1963. His highest rank was maegashira 1. Upon retirement from active competition he became an elder in the Japan Sumo Association under the name Kiyomigata. He left the Sumo Association in October 1976.

== Career record ==
Tochiōyama Yuki
Year	January Hatsu basho, Tokyo	March Haru basho, Osaka	May Natsu basho, Tokyo	July Nagoya basho, Nagoya	September Aki basho, Tokyo	November Kyūshū basho, Fukuoka
1958	x	x	x	x	x	(Maezumo)
1959	West Jonokuchi #13; 8–0; Champion	East Jonidan #53; 5–2–1	West Jonidan #26; 5–3	East Jonidan #10; 5–3	West Sandanme #100; 6–2	West Sandanme #59; 3–5
1960	West Sandanme #72; 6–2	East Sandanme #39; 5–3	West Sandanme #18; 5–3	West Makushita #84; 4–2–1	East Makushita #69; 5–2	East Makushita #57; 4–3
1961	West Makushita #52; 5–2	East Makushita #39; 4–3	East Makushita #33; 5–2	East Makushita #24; 6–1	West Makushita #5; 3–4	East Makushita #8; 4–3
1962	West Makushita #4; 3–4	East Makushita #6; 5–2	East Jūryō #18; 10–5	East Jūryō #6; 5–10	West Jūryō #11; 10–5	West Jūryō #5; 12–3
1963	East Maegashira #14; 5–10	East Jūryō #2; 8–7	West Jūryō #1; 9–6	East Jūryō #1; 9–6	West Maegashira #14; 7–8	East Maegashira #15; 8–7
1964	West Maegashira #13; 2–13	West Jūryō #6; 12–3; Champion	East Maegashira #14; 7–8	East Maegashira #15; 1–2–12	East Jūryō #10; 10–5	East Jūryō #4; 8–7
1965	East Jūryō #3; 7–8	West Jūryō #5; 8–7	West Jūryō #2; 11–4	East Maegashira #12; 11–4; F	West Maegashira #5; 9–6	East Maegashira #3; 7–8
1966	West Maegashira #3; 5–10 ★	West Maegashira #7; 6–9	East Maegashira #9; 8–7	West Maegashira #7; 0–1–14	East Jūryō #1; Sat out due to injury 0–0–15	West Jūryō #15; 9–6
1967	West Jūryō #7; 10–5	East Jūryō #4; 11–4	West Jūryō #1; 8–7	East Jūryō #1; 4–11	East Jūryō #11; 9–6	East Jūryō #7; 7–8
1968	East Jūryō #8; 10–5	West Jūryō #2; 9–6	East Maegashira #11; 7–8	West Maegashira #11; 8–7	East Maegashira #8; 9–6	East Maegashira #5; 9–6
1969	West Maegashira #1; 2–10–3 ★	East Maegashira #10; 7–8	East Maegashira #11; 9–6	East Maegashira #6; 7–8	West Maegashira #7; 6–9	West Maegashira #10; 8–7
1970	East Maegashira #6; 7–8	East Maegashira #7; 8–7	East Maegashira #5; 5–10	East Maegashira #8; 10–5	West Maegashira #1; 3–12	East Maegashira #8; 9–6
1971	East Maegashira #2; 2–13	West Maegashira #9; 8–7	East Maegashira #9; 7–8	East Maegashira #12; 8–7	West Maegashira #11; 6–9	East Jūryō #1; 9–6
1972	East Maegashira #11; Retired; 2–13	x	x	x	x	x
Record given as wins–losses–absences Top division champion Top division runner-up Retired Lower divisions Non-participation Sanshō key: F=Fighting spirit; O=Outstanding performance; T=Technique Also shown: ★=Kinboshi; P=Playoff(s); Divisions: Makuuchi — Jūryō — Makushita — Sandanme — Jonidan — Jonokuchi Makuuchi ranks: Yokozuna — Ōzeki — Sekiwake — Komusubi — Maegashira

== See also ==
- Glossary of sumo terms
- List of past sumo wrestlers
- List of sumo tournament second division champions
