= Yoshioyama Osamu =

Japanese sumo wrestler

Personal information
- Native name: 吉王山 修
- Born: Osamu Yoshimura; 20 May 1949 (age 77) Yatsushiro, Kumamoto, Japan
- Height: 1.84 m (6 ft 1/2 in)
- Weight: 130 kg (290 lb)

Sport
- Sport: Sumo
- Retired: January, 1976
- Heya: Mihogaseki
- Record: 403-396-0
- Debut: March, 1965
- Highest rank: Maegashira 2 (March, 1972)
- Elder name: Onogawa
- Championships: 1 (Jūryō); 1 (Sandanme)
- Updated on June 2020

Yoshioyama Osamu (born 20 May 1949 as Osamu Yoshimura) is a former sumo wrestler from Yatsushiro, Kumamoto, Japan. He made his professional debut in March 1965 and reached the top division in November 1969. His highest rank was maegashira 2. Upon retirement from active competition he became an elder in the Japan Sumo Association under the name Onogawa. He left the Sumo Association in January 1977.

== Career record ==
Yoshioyama Osamu
| Year | January Hatsu basho, Tokyo | March Haru basho, Osaka | May Natsu basho, Tokyo | July Nagoya basho, Nagoya | September Aki basho, Tokyo | November Kyūshū basho, Fukuoka |
|---|---|---|---|---|---|---|
| 1965 | x | (Maezumo) | West Jonokuchi #15; 5–2 | West Jonidan #68; 5–2 | East Jonidan #44; 3–4 | West Jonidan #63; 3–4 |
| 1966 | East Jonidan #79; 7–0–P | West Sandanme #68; 3–4 | West Sandanme #76; 4–3 | East Sandanme #49; 4–3 | East Sandanme #25; 3–4 | West Sandanme #38; 7–0–P; Champion |
| 1967 | West Makushita #47; 3–4 | East Makushita #52; 1–6 | West Sandanme #40; 5–2 | East Sandanme #9; 5–2 | West Makushita #48; 4–3 | East Makushita #41; 5–2 |
| 1968 | West Makushita #24; 4–3 | West Makushita #19; 5–2 | East Makushita #10; 2–5 | East Makushita #18; 6–1 | East Makushita #5; 5–2 | West Jūryō #13; 8–7 |
| 1969 | West Jūryō #10; 11–4–P | West Jūryō #2; 5–10 | West Jūryō #9; 8–7 | East Jūryō #6; 8–7 | East Jūryō #3; 10–5 | West Maegashira #12; 6–9 |
| 1970 | East Jūryō #2; 6–9 | East Jūryō #5; 8–7 | East Jūryō #3; 8–7 | East Jūryō #2; 11–4 | West Maegashira #10; 3–12 | East Jūryō #5; 7–8 |
| 1971 | East Jūryō #7; 8–7 | East Jūryō #6; 4–11 | East Makushita #1; 5–2 | East Jūryō #11; 13–2; Champion | East Jūryō #1; 8–7 | West Maegashira #12; 8–7 |
| 1972 | West Maegashira #8; 10–5 | East Maegashira #2; 6–9 | East Maegashira #5; 5–10 | West Maegashira #9; 7–8 | West Maegashira #11; 8–7 | West Maegashira #9; 1–14 |
| 1973 | West Jūryō #5; 8–7 | East Jūryō #3; 7–8 | East Jūryō #4; 8–7 | East Jūryō #3; 10–5 | West Maegashira #12; 8–7 | East Maegashira #9; 8–7 |
| 1974 | East Maegashira #8; 6–9 | West Maegashira #11; 8–7 | East Maegashira #9; 8–7 | West Maegashira #6; 5–10 | West Maegashira #11; 2–13 | West Jūryō #7; 8–7 |
| 1975 | East Jūryō #4; 7–8 | West Jūryō #5; 7–8 | East Jūryō #7; 7–8 | East Jūryō #9; 8–7 | West Jūryō #8; 8–7 | West Jūryō #7; 6–9 |
| 1976 | West Jūryō #12; Retired; 3–12–0 | x | x | x | x | x |
Record given as wins–losses–absences Top division champion Top division runner-up Retired Lower divisions Non-participation Sanshō key: F=Fighting spirit; O=Outstanding performance; T=Technique Also shown: ★=Kinboshi; P=Playoff(s); Divisions: Makuuchi — Jūryō — Makushita — Sandanme — Jonidan — Jonokuchi Makuuchi ranks: Yokozuna — Ōzeki — Sekiwake — Komusubi — Maegashira

== See also ==
- Glossary of sumo terms
- List of past sumo wrestlers
- List of sumo tournament second division champions
