= Tamaarashi Kōhei =

Japanese sumo wrestler (1941–1993)

Personal information
- Native name: 玉嵐 孝平
- Born: Kōhei Narita; August 1, 1941 Memuro, Hokkaidō, Japan
- Died: February 28, 1993 (aged 51)
- Height: 1.73 m (5 ft 8 in)
- Weight: 116 kg (256 lb; 18.3 st)

Sport
- Sport: Sumo
- Retired: July, 1967
- Heya: Nishonoseki → Kataonami
- Record: 377-322-15-1 (draw)
- Debut: September, 1956
- Highest rank: Maegashira 4 (November, 1962)
- Championships: 2 (Jūryō); 1 (Makushita)
- Updated on Sep. 2012

Tamaarashi Kōhei (born Kōhei Narita; August 1, 1941 – February 28, 1993) was a sumo wrestler from Memuro, Hokkaidō, Japan. He made his professional debut in September 1956, and reached the top division in July 1962. His highest rank was maegashira 4. He left the sumo world upon retirement in July 1967.

== Career record ==
- The Kyushu tournament was first held in 1957, and the Nagoya tournament in 1958.

Tamaarashi Kōhei
Year	January Hatsu basho, Tokyo	March Haru basho, Osaka	May Natsu basho, Tokyo	July Nagoya basho, Nagoya	September Aki basho, Tokyo	November Kyūshū basho, Fukuoka
1956	x	x	x	Not held	(Maezumo)	Not held
1957	East Jonokuchi #24; 6–2	East Jonidan #91; 5–3	East Jonidan #59; 5–3	Not held	West Jonidan #14; 4–4	East Jonidan #12; 5–3
1958	East Sandanme #97; 5–3	West Sandanme #78; 5–3	East Sandanme #65; 6–2	West Sandanme #34; 3–5	East Sandanme #41; 6–2	West Sandanme #22; 6–2
1959	East Sandanme #4; 5–3	West Makushita #76; 5–3	East Makushita #72; 4–4	East Makushita #70; 3–5	West Makushita #80; 7–1	West Makushita #48; 3–5
1960	East Makushita #60; 3–5	East Makushita #64; 5–1	West Makushita #48; 4–4	East Makushita #46; 6–1	West Makushita #26; 7–0–P	West Makushita #2; 4–3
1961	East Makushita #2; 4–3	West Makushita #1; 3–4	West Makushita #4; 4–3	West Makushita #2; 5–2	East Makushita #1; 5–2	East Makushita #1; 3–4
1962	West Makushita #3; 7–0; Champion	West Jūryō #15; 10–5	East Jūryō #5; 12–3; Champion	East Maegashira #13; 8–7	East Maegashira #10; 9–6	East Maegashira #4; 5–10
1963	West Maegashira #10; 8–6–1	East Maegashira #6; 6–9	East Maegashira #8; 9–6	East Maegashira #4; 6–9	East Maegashira #6; 5–10	West Maegashira #9; 9–6
1964	East Maegashira #4; 3–12	West Maegashira #13; 5–3–7	West Jūryō #4; 10–5	East Jūryō #1; 7–8	West Jūryō #2; 4–11	East Jūryō #8; 10–5
1965	West Jūryō #4; 7–8	East Jūryō #6; 7–8	East Jūryō #7; 8–7	West Jūryō #4; 8–7	East Jūryō #3; 8–7	West Jūryō #2; 12–3; Champion
1966	West Maegashira #14; 6–9	West Jūryō #1; 8–7	East Jūryō #1; 3–12	West Jūryō #10; 6–9	West Jūryō #13; 9–6	West Jūryō #5; 5–10
1967	West Jūryō #10; 6–9	East Jūryō #13; 9–6	West Jūryō #12; 6–8–1(draw)	East Makushita #1; Retired; 0–0–7		
Record given as wins–losses–absences Top division champion Top division runner-up Retired Lower divisions Non-participation Sanshō key: F=Fighting spirit; O=Outstanding performance; T=Technique Also shown: ★=Kinboshi; P=Playoff(s); Divisions: Makuuchi — Jūryō — Makushita — Sandanme — Jonidan — Jonokuchi Makuuchi ranks: Yokozuna — Ōzeki — Sekiwake — Komusubi — Maegashira

== See also ==
- Glossary of sumo terms
- List of past sumo wrestlers
- List of sumo tournament second division champions
