= Shiratayama Hidetoshi =

Japanese sumo wrestler

Personal information
- Native name: 白田山 秀敏
- Born: Hidetoshi Shirata; 25 December 1943 (age 82) Kagami, Kumamoto, Japan
- Height: 1.83 m (6 ft 0 in)
- Weight: 100 kg (220 lb)

Sport
- Sport: Sumo
- Retired: July, 1977
- Heya: Takasago
- Record: 594-608-0
- Debut: July, 1959
- Highest rank: Maegashira 4 (May, 1971)
- Elder name: Tanigawa
- Championships: 1 (Jūryō)
- Updated on June 2020

Shiratayama Hidetoshi (born 25 December 1943 as Hidetoshi Shirata) is a former sumo wrestler from Kagami, Kumamoto, Japan. He made his professional debut in September July 1959 and reached the top division in March 1971. His highest rank was maegashira 4. Upon retirement from active competition he became an elder in the Japan Sumo Association, under the name Tanigawa. He reached the Sumo Association's mandatory retirement age in December 2008.

== Career record ==
Shiratayama Hidetoshi
| Year | January Hatsu basho, Tokyo | March Haru basho, Osaka | May Natsu basho, Tokyo | July Nagoya basho, Nagoya | September Aki basho, Tokyo | November Kyūshū basho, Fukuoka |
|---|---|---|---|---|---|---|
| 1959 | x | x | x | (Maezumo) | East Jonokuchi #25; 4–4 | West Jonidan #148; 6–2 |
| 1960 | West Jonidan #111; 3–5 | West Jonidan #109; 5–3 | East Jonidan #76; 4–4 | West Jonidan #67; 3–4 | East Jonidan #75; 5–2 | West Jonidan #21; 4–3 |
| 1961 | East Sandanme #113; 4–3 | East Sandanme #85; 3–4 | West Sandanme #99; 2–5 | West Jonidan #6; 4–3 | East Sandanme #95; 4–3 | East Sandanme #72; 4–3 |
| 1962 | West Sandanme #54; 0–7 | West Sandanme #89; 4–3 | East Sandanme #77; 4–3 | East Sandanme #62; 3–4 | West Sandanme #76; 4–3 | West Sandanme #59; 3–4 |
| 1963 | East Sandanme #67; 4–3 | West Sandanme #45; 4–3 | East Sandanme #28; 5–2 | West Makushita #88; 5–2 | East Makushita #59; 3–4 | East Makushita #65; 5–2 |
| 1964 | West Makushita #50; 4–3 | East Makushita #40; 3–4 | East Makushita #43; 6–1 | West Makushita #17; 4–3 | East Makushita #13; 4–3 | East Makushita #9; 4–3 |
| 1965 | West Makushita #5; 2–5 | East Makushita #14; 3–4 | West Makushita #18; 3–4 | West Makushita #21; 2–5 | East Makushita #31; 5–2 | West Makushita #14; 2–5 |
| 1966 | East Makushita #23; 4–3 | East Makushita #18; 3–4 | West Makushita #21; 4–3 | East Makushita #18; 4–3 | West Makushita #13; 5–2 | West Makushita #7; 3–4 |
| 1967 | West Makushita #9; 1–6 | East Makushita #26; 3–4 | East Makushita #40; 5–2 | West Makushita #23; 6–1 | East Makushita #6; 4–3 | West Makushita #4; 5–2 |
| 1968 | West Jūryō #13; 9–6 | East Jūryō #7; 9–6 | West Jūryō #3; 5–10 | West Jūryō #9; 10–5 | West Jūryō #3; 7–8 | West Jūryō #4; 6–9 |
| 1969 | East Jūryō #6; 8–7 | West Jūryō #4; 6–9 | West Jūryō #10; 5–10 | West Makushita #1; 4–3 | East Jūryō #13; 8–7 | West Jūryō #11; 8–7 |
| 1970 | West Jūryō #9; 6–9 | East Jūryō #12; 9–6 | East Jūryō #6; 7–8 | East Jūryō #8; 9–6 | West Jūryō #3; 7–8 | West Jūryō #4; 9–6 |
| 1971 | East Jūryō #2; 11–4–P; Champion | East Maegashira #8; 8–7 | East Maegashira #4; 2–13 | West Maegashira #11; 8–7 | East Maegashira #10; 8–7 | West Maegashira #7; 6–9 |
| 1972 | West Maegashira #9; 9–6 | East Maegashira #7; 3–12 | West Jūryō #4; 10–5 | East Maegashira #12; 6–9 | West Jūryō #1; 6–9 | West Jūryō #3; 8–7 |
| 1973 | East Jūryō #2; 7–8 | East Jūryō #4; 7–8 | East Jūryō #5; 7–8 | East Jūryō #6; 9–6 | East Jūryō #2; 5–10 | West Jūryō #8; 8–7 |
| 1974 | East Jūryō #4; 8–7 | West Jūryō #1; 6–9 | West Jūryō #4; 9–6 | West Maegashira #12; 9–6 | West Maegashira #6; 7–8 | West Maegashira #8; 8–7 |
| 1975 | East Maegashira #5; 5–10 | West Maegashira #12; 6–9 | West Jūryō #1; 9–6 | East Maegashira #12; 3–12 | West Jūryō #6; 8–7 | East Jūryō #5; 6–9 |
| 1976 | West Jūryō #9; 8–7 | East Jūryō #8; 8–7 | East Jūryō #5; 6–9 | East Jūryō #9; 8–7 | West Jūryō #8; 8–7 | East Jūryō #3; 8–7 |
| 1977 | East Jūryō #2; 6–9 | West Jūryō #5; 5–10 | West Jūryō #11; Retired; 5–10–0 | | | |
Record given as wins–losses–absences Top division champion Top division runner-up Retired Lower divisions Non-participation Sanshō key: F=Fighting spirit; O=Outstanding performance; T=Technique Also shown: ★=Kinboshi; P=Playoff(s); Divisions: Makuuchi — Jūryō — Makushita — Sandanme — Jonidan — Jonokuchi Makuuchi ranks: Yokozuna — Ōzeki — Sekiwake — Komusubi — Maegashira

== See also ==
- Glossary of sumo terms
- List of past sumo wrestlers
- List of sumo tournament second division champions
