= Tensuiyama Masanori =

Japanese sumo wrestler

Personal information
- Native name: 天水山 正則
- Born: Masanori Ikeda; 8 December 1940 (age 85) Tensui, Kumamoto
- Height: 1.7 m (5 ft 7 in)
- Weight: 128 kg (282 lb)

Sport
- Sport: Sumo
- Retired: September, 1968
- Heya: Araiso → Isegahama
- Record: 397-367-2
- Debut: May, 1956
- Highest rank: Maegashira 10 (July, 1965)
- Championships: 2 (Jūryō); 1 (Makushita)
- Updated on Sep. 2012

Tensuiyama Masanori (born 8 December 1940 as Masanori Ikeda) is a former sumo wrestler from Tensui, Kumamoto, Japan. He made his professional debut in May 1956, and reached the top division in May 1965. His highest rank was maegashira 10. He left the sumo world upon retirement in September 1968.

== Career record ==
- The Kyushu tournament was first held in 1957, and the Nagoya tournament in 1958.

Tensuiyama Masanori
Year	January Hatsu basho, Tokyo	March Haru basho, Osaka	May Natsu basho, Tokyo	July Nagoya basho, Nagoya	September Aki basho, Tokyo	November Kyūshū basho, Fukuoka
1956	x	x	(Maezumo)	Not held	West Jonokuchi #25; 3–5	Not held
1957	West Jonidan #111; 5–3	West Jonidan #77; 8–0–P	East Sandanme #82; 4–4	Not held	West Sandanme #65; 6–2	West Sandanme #38; 4–4
1958	West Sandanme #37; 5–3	West Sandanme #28; 4–4	West Sandanme #25; 4–4	East Sandanme #21; 6–2	West Makushita #83; 5–3	West Makushita #68; 4–4
1959	West Makushita #66; 4–4	East Makushita #64; 5–3	West Makushita #57; 6–2	East Makushita #39; 4–4	East Makushita #38; 5–3	West Makushita #29; 5–3
1960	East Makushita #26; 4–4	East Makushita #24; 5–3	West Makushita #18; 4–4	West Makushita #17; 2–5	East Makushita #31; 3–4	East Makushita #35; 4–3
1961	East Makushita #33; 2–5	East Makushita #45; 2–5	West Makushita #65; 6–1	East Makushita #38; 3–4	West Makushita #45; 3–4	West Makushita #50; 3–4
1962	East Makushita #57; 6–1	East Makushita #33; 4–3	East Makushita #30; 4–3	East Makushita #25; 4–3	West Makushita #23; 4–3	West Makushita #19; 5–2
1963	East Makushita #9; 3–4	West Makushita #11; 5–2	East Makushita #6; 7–0; Champion	West Jūryō #15; 9–6	East Jūryō #10; 8–7	East Jūryō #7; 6–9
1964	West Jūryō #9; 7–8	East Jūryō #10; 8–7	East Jūryō #8; 7–8	West Jūryō #9; 5–10	East Jūryō #16; 9–6	East Jūryō #7; 7–8
1965	East Jūryō #8; 11–4	West Jūryō #4; 12–3–P; Champion	East Maegashira #14; 8–7	West Maegashira #10; 2–13	West Jūryō #4; 6–9	West Jūryō #7; 7–8
1966	West Jūryō #8; 9–6	West Jūryō #2; 6–9	East Jūryō #6; 8–7	East Jūryō #4; 5–10	West Jūryō #8; 8–7	West Jūryō #4; 6–9
1967	East Jūryō #7; 8–7	East Jūryō #6; 8–7	East Jūryō #7; 12–3; Champion	West Maegashira #10; 7–8	East Jūryō #1; 8–7	East Maegashira #11; 6–9
1968	East Jūryō #2; 5–10	West Jūryō #7; 7–8	West Jūryō #9; 7–8	West Jūryō #11; 4–11	West Makushita #4; Retired; 1–4–2	
Record given as wins–losses–absences Top division champion Top division runner-up Retired Lower divisions Non-participation Sanshō key: F=Fighting spirit; O=Outstanding performance; T=Technique Also shown: ★=Kinboshi; P=Playoff(s); Divisions: Makuuchi — Jūryō — Makushita — Sandanme — Jonidan — Jonokuchi Makuuchi ranks: Yokozuna — Ōzeki — Sekiwake — Komusubi — Maegashira

== See also ==
- Glossary of sumo terms
- List of past sumo wrestlers
- List of sumo tournament second division champions
