= Kiminishiki Toshimasa =

Japanese sumo wrestler

Personal information
- Native name: 君錦 利正
- Born: Toshimasa Gomi; 6 July 1937 (age 89) Kisarazu, Chiba, Japan
- Height: 1.77 m (5 ft 9 1/2 in)
- Weight: 125 kg (276 lb)

Sport
- Sport: Sumo
- Retired: May, 1968
- Heya: Tatsunami
- Record: 506-470-9-1 (draw)
- Debut: May, 1953
- Highest rank: Maegashira 3 (May, 1963)
- Championships: 1 (Jūryō)
- Updated on Sep. 2012

Kiminishiki Toshimasa (born 6 July 1937 as Toshimasa Gomi) is a former sumo wrestler from Kisarazu, Chiba, Japan. He made his professional debut in May 1953, and reached the top division in July 1961. His highest rank was maegashira 3. He left the sumo world upon retirement in May 1968.

== Career record ==
- The Kyushu tournament was first held in 1957, and the Nagoya tournament in 1958.

Kiminishiki Toshimasa
Year	January Hatsu basho, Tokyo	March Haru basho, Osaka	May Natsu basho, Tokyo	July Nagoya basho, Nagoya	September Aki basho, Tokyo	November Kyūshū basho, Fukuoka
1953	x	x	Shinjo; 2–1	Not held	East Jonidan #48; 6–2	Not held
1954	West Jonidan #19; 4–4	East Jonidan #3; 4–4	West Sandanme #71; 6–2	Not held	East Sandanme #50; 6–2	Not held
1955	West Sandanme #32; 4–4	West Sandanme #23; 4–4	West Sandanme #19; 5–3	Not held	West Sandanme #4; 4–4	Not held
1956	East Sandanme #2; 4–4	East Makushita #65; 4–4	East Makushita #63; 5–3	Not held	West Makushita #58; 5–3	Not held
1957	West Makushita #48; 3–5	West Makushita #52; 5–3	West Makushita #41; 4–4	Not held	West Makushita #41; 6–2	West Makushita #27; 6–2
1958	East Makushita #18; 5–3	East Makushita #13; 3–5	East Makushita #18; 3–5	East Makushita #22; 5–3	East Makushita #18; 6–2	West Makushita #7; 3–5
1959	East Makushita #10; 4–4	East Makushita #10; 4–4	East Makushita #10; 5–3	West Makushita #7; 5–3	East Makushita #7; 5–3	West Makushita #3; 6–2
1960	West Makushita #2; 5–3	West Jūryō #16; 8–7	East Jūryō #11; 8–7	East Jūryō #11; 8–7	East Jūryō #7; 7–8	East Jūryō #8; 9–6
1961	East Jūryō #5; 6–9	West Jūryō #7; 8–7	West Jūryō #5; 11–3–1draw	West Maegashira #12; 7–8	West Maegashira #12; 4–11	East Jūryō #5; 10–5
1962	East Jūryō #1; 10–5	East Maegashira #13; 9–6	East Maegashira #4; 5–10	West Maegashira #9; 5–10	East Maegashira #13; 8–7	East Maegashira #11; 6–9
1963	West Maegashira #13; 8–7	East Maegashira #9; 10–5	East Maegashira #3; 5–10	East Maegashira #7; 3–7–5	East Jūryō #1; 3–12	East Jūryō #8; 6–9
1964	West Jūryō #10; 13–2–P	East Jūryō #3; 5–10	West Jūryō #8; 10–5	East Jūryō #4; 11–4	East Maegashira #14; 8–7	West Maegashira #13; 8–7
1965	West Maegashira #8; 6–9	East Maegashira #10; 7–8	East Maegashira #11; 8–7	East Maegashira #8; 6–9	West Maegashira #10; 4–7–4	West Jūryō #2; 6–9
1966	East Jūryō #5; 7–8	East Jūryō #6; 13–2; Champion	West Maegashira #14; 8–7	East Maegashira #12; 6–9	East Maegashira #14; 7–8	East Jūryō #1; 7–8
1967	East Jūryō #2; 7–8	East Jūryō #3; 8–7	East Jūryō #4; 6–9	West Jūryō #6; 8–7	West Jūryō #3; 6–9	West Jūryō #6; 5–10
1968	East Jūryō #12; 9–6	West Jūryō #6; 7–8	West Jūryō #8; Retired; 0–0–0	x	x	x
Record given as wins–losses–absences Top division champion Top division runner-up Retired Lower divisions Non-participation Sanshō key: F=Fighting spirit; O=Outstanding performance; T=Technique Also shown: ★=Kinboshi; P=Playoff(s); Divisions: Makuuchi — Jūryō — Makushita — Sandanme — Jonidan — Jonokuchi Makuuchi ranks: Yokozuna — Ōzeki — Sekiwake — Komusubi — Maegashira

== See also ==
- Glossary of sumo terms
- List of past sumo wrestlers
- List of sumo tournament second division champions
