= Amatsukaze Masao =

Japanese sumo wrestler (1937–2013)

Personal information
- Native name: 天津風 征夫
- Born: Masao Miyanaga; 1 December 1937 Monzen, Ishikawa, Japan
- Died: 30 April 2013 (aged 75)
- Height: 1.79 m (5 ft 10 1/2 in)
- Weight: 124 kg (273 lb)

Sport
- Sport: Sumo
- Retired: May, 1967
- Heya: Tokitsukaze
- Record: 381-368-33
- Debut: May, 1955
- Highest rank: Maegashira 3 (September, 1962)
- Championships: 2 (Jūryō)
- Updated on Sep. 2012

Amatsukaze Masao, born Masao Miyanaga (1 December 1937 – 30 April 2013), was a sumo wrestler from Monzen, Ishikawa, Japan. He made his professional debut in May 1955 and reached the top division in September 1962. His highest rank was maegashira 3. He left the sumo world upon retirement in May 1967.

== Career record ==
- The Kyushu tournament was first held in 1957, and the Nagoya tournament in 1958.

Amatsukaze Masao
Year	January Hatsu basho, Tokyo	March Haru basho, Osaka	May Natsu basho, Tokyo	July Nagoya basho, Nagoya	September Aki basho, Tokyo	November Kyūshū basho, Fukuoka
1955	x	x	(Maezumo)	Not held	East Jonokuchi #11; 6–0–2	Not held
1956	East Jonidan #63; 7–1	East Jonidan #13; 0–0–8	East Jonidan #27; 5–2–1	Not held	East Sandanme #96; 0–0–8	Not held
1957	East Jonidan #8; 6–2	East Sandanme #86; 7–1–P	West Sandanme #41; 4–4	Not held	East Sandanme #32; 5–3	West Sandanme #14; 6–2
1958	West Makushita #80; 5–3	East Makushita #71; 4–4	East Makushita #70; 4–4	East Makushita #68; 5–3	East Makushita #58; 6–2	West Makushita #46; 5–3
1959	West Makushita #39; 6–2	West Makushita #30; 3–5	East Makushita #36; 3–5	West Makushita #39; 2–6	East Makushita #52; 5–3	West Makushita #42; 6–2
1960	East Makushita #30; 4–4	East Makushita #26; 6–2	East Makushita #15; 4–4	East Makushita #15; 4–3	East Makushita #13; 5–2	East Makushita #6; 3–4
1961	East Makushita #7; 4–3	East Makushita #4; 5–2	East Jūryō #18; 10–5	West Jūryō #9; 7–8	East Jūryō #10; 12–3–P	East Jūryō #3; 10–5
1962	East Maegashira #13; 5–10	East Jūryō #1; 11–4; Champion	East Maegashira #10; 7–8	East Maegashira #10; 10–5	West Maegashira #3; 2–13	West Maegashira #13; 10–5
1963	East Maegashira #4; 6–9	West Maegashira #5; 6–9	East Maegashira #7; 8–7	East Maegashira #5; 4–11	East Maegashira #11; 6–9	West Maegashira #12; 9–6
1964	East Maegashira #6; 7–8	West Maegashira #6; 4–11	West Maegashira #10; 2–2–11	East Jūryō #2; 3–12	West Jūryō #11; 7–8	West Jūryō #6; 4–11
1965	West Jūryō #12; 8–7	West Jūryō #8; 8–7	East Jūryō #5; 2–13	West Jūryō #15; 12–3–P; Champion	West Jūryō #2; 10–5	East Maegashira #13; 8–7
1966	West Maegashira #12; 2–13	East Jūryō #4; 8–7	East Jūryō #3; 3–12	West Jūryō #12; 8–7	West Jūryō #6; 4–11	East Jūryō #16; 8–7
1967	East Jūryō #11; 6–9	West Jūryō #13; 7–8	East Makushita #5; Retired; 1–3–3			
Record given as wins–losses–absences Top division champion Top division runner-up Retired Lower divisions Non-participation Sanshō key: F=Fighting spirit; O=Outstanding performance; T=Technique Also shown: ★=Kinboshi; P=Playoff(s); Divisions: Makuuchi — Jūryō — Makushita — Sandanme — Jonidan — Jonokuchi Makuuchi ranks: Yokozuna — Ōzeki — Sekiwake — Komusubi — Maegashira

== See also ==
- Glossary of sumo terms
- List of past sumo wrestlers
- List of sumo tournament second division champions
