= Wakanokuni Takeo =

Japanese sumo wrestler

Personal information
- Native name: 若ノ國 豪夫
- Born: Teruo Ito; 4 April 1936 (age 90) Nannō, Gifu, Japan
- Height: 1.81 m (5 ft 11 1/2 in)
- Weight: 125 kg (276 lb)

Sport
- Sport: Sumo
- Retired: September, 1969
- Heya: Shibatayama → Hanakago
- Record: 592-555-21
- Debut: March, 1953
- Highest rank: Maegashira 8 (July, 1960)
- Championships: 3 (Jūryō)
- Updated on Sep. 2012

Wakanokuni Takeo (born 4 April 1936 as Teruo Ito) is a former sumo wrestler from Nannō, Gifu, Japan. He made his professional debut in March 1953 and reached the top division in November 1959. His highest rank was maegashira 8. He left the sumo world upon retirement from active competition in September 1969.

== Career record ==
- The Kyushu tournament was first held in 1957, and the Nagoya tournament in 1958.

Wakanokuni Takeo
Year	January Hatsu basho, Tokyo	March Haru basho, Osaka	May Natsu basho, Tokyo	July Nagoya basho, Nagoya	September Aki basho, Tokyo	November Kyūshū basho, Fukuoka
1953	x	(Maezumo)	West Jonokuchi #2; 3–4–1	Not held	West Jonidan #54; 6–2	Not held
1954	East Jonidan #30; 6–2	West Sandanme #62; 7–1	East Sandanme #33; 3–3–2	Not held	West Sandanme #35; 4–4	Not held
1955	West Sandanme #29; 6–2	West Sandanme #3; 5–3	East Makushita #46; 7–1	Not held	East Makushita #22; 2–5	Not held
1956	West Makushita #26; 6–2	East Makushita #16; 4–4	West Makushita #15; 3–5	Not held	West Makushita #21; 4–4	Not held
1957	West Makushita #20; 6–2	East Makushita #8; 4–4	East Makushita #7; 4–4	Not held	East Makushita #7; 4–4	East Makushita #7; 4–4
1958	East Makushita #8; 4–4	West Makushita #7; 4–4	East Makushita #7; 6–2	East Makushita #2; 2–6	West Makushita #8; 6–2	East Makushita #2; 4–4
1959	East Makushita #2; 7–1	West Jūryō #21; 10–5	East Jūryō #10; 12–3; Champion	West Jūryō #1; 8–7	East Jūryō #1; 8–7	East Maegashira #17; 8–7
1960	West Maegashira #14; 9–6	East Maegashira #10; 7–8	West Maegashira #10; 8–7	East Maegashira #8; 4–11	West Maegashira #13; 9–6	West Maegashira #9; 6–9
1961	West Maegashira #13; 4–11	East Jūryō #4; 11–4	West Maegashira #11; 8–7	West Maegashira #9; 6–9	East Maegashira #10; 6–9	West Maegashira #12; 8–7
1962	West Maegashira #11; 4–11	West Jūryō #1; 10–5	West Maegashira #11; 3–12	West Jūryō #3; 9–6	East Jūryō #1; 9–6	East Maegashira #14; 3–7–5
1963	West Jūryō #5; 9–6	West Jūryō #1; 11–4	West Maegashira #11; 9–6	East Maegashira #8; 5–10	West Maegashira #15; 6–9	East Jūryō #2; 6–9
1964	East Jūryō #4; 10–5	East Jūryō #2; 11–4	East Maegashira #13; 5–10	West Jūryō #1; 5–4–6	West Jūryō #4; 3–12	East Jūryō #15; 9–6
1965	East Jūryō #9; 12–3; Champion	East Jūryō #4; 6–9	West Jūryō #6; 6–9	West Jūryō #8; 10–5	West Jūryō #3; 10–5	West Jūryō #1; 9–6
1966	East Jūryō #1; 6–9	East Jūryō #3; 8–7	East Jūryō #2; 6–9	East Jūryō #5; 5–10	East Jūryō #10; 6–9	East Jūryō #14; 10–5
1967	West Jūryō #3; 7–8	West Jūryō #4; 9–6	West Jūryō #3; 8–7	East Jūryō #2; 9–6	West Maegashira #11; 5–10	West Jūryō #2; 12–3; Champion
1968	East Maegashira #8; 4–11	East Jūryō #2; 8–7	West Maegashira #12; 8–7	East Maegashira #8; 4–11	East Jūryō #3; 6–9	East Jūryō #7; 9–6
1969	East Jūryō #3; 6–9	West Jūryō #8; 9–6	East Jūryō #3; 8–7	East Jūryō #2; 4–11	East Jūryō #9; Retired; 1–7–7	x
Record given as wins–losses–absences Top division champion Top division runner-up Retired Lower divisions Non-participation Sanshō key: F=Fighting spirit; O=Outstanding performance; T=Technique Also shown: ★=Kinboshi; P=Playoff(s); Divisions: Makuuchi — Jūryō — Makushita — Sandanme — Jonidan — Jonokuchi Makuuchi ranks: Yokozuna — Ōzeki — Sekiwake — Komusubi — Maegashira

== See also ==
- Glossary of sumo terms
- List of past sumo wrestlers
- List of sumo tournament second division champions
