= Matsumaeyama Takeshi =

Japanese sumo wrestler

Personal information
- Native name: 松前山 武士
- Born: Sadao Watanabe; 29 June 1940 (age 86) Matsumae, Hokkaidō, Japan
- Height: 1.73 m (5 ft 8 in)
- Weight: 94 kg (207 lb)

Sport
- Sport: Sumo
- Retired: November, 1967
- Heya: Dewanoumi → Kokonoe
- Record: 301-205-73
- Debut: January, 1958
- Highest rank: Maegashira 9 (May, 1965)
- Championships: 1 (Jūryō); 1 (Makushita); 1 (Jonokuchi)
- Updated on Sep. 2012

Matsumaeyama Takeshi (born 29 June 1940 as Sadao Watanabe) is a former sumo wrestler from Matsumae, Hokkaidō, Japan. He made his professional debut in January 1958 and reached the top division in July 1964. His shikona ring name came from his birthplace of Matsumae. His highest rank was maegashira 9. He was forced to miss six tournaments after being diagnosed with pulmonary tuberculosis and fell to the sandanme division. However he managed to return to the sekitori level and won the jūryō division championship in March 1967 with a 12–3 record. This was his first tournament fighting for the newly formed Kokonoe stable. Upon retirement from active competition at the age of 27 he became an elder in the Japan Sumo Association under the name Onoe. He left the Sumo Association in November 1968 and opened a chankonabe restaurant in Kabukichō, Tokyo.

== Career record ==
Matsumaeyama Takeshi
Year	January Hatsu basho, Tokyo	March Haru basho, Osaka	May Natsu basho, Tokyo	July Nagoya basho, Nagoya	September Aki basho, Tokyo	November Kyūshū basho, Fukuoka
1958	(Maezumo)	West Jonokuchi #4; 8–0; Champion	East Jonidan #37; 5–3	West Jonidan #17; 6–2	West Sandanme #96; 6–2	East Sandanme #76; 5–3
1959	West Sandanme #60; 5–3	West Sandanme #43; 5–3	West Sandanme #28; 6–2	West Sandanme #12; 5–3	West Sandanme #9; 5–3	East Makushita #71; 3–5
1960	West Sandanme #1; 6–2	West Makushita #68; 5–3	West Makushita #56; 4–4	West Makushita #55; 2–5	West Makushita #77; 5–2	East Makushita #65; 3–4
1961	East Makushita #72; 5–2	West Makushita #48; 5–2	East Makushita #35; 6–1	East Makushita #12; 4–3	East Makushita #7; 4–3	East Makushita #5; 4–3
1962	West Makushita #1; 3–4	East Makushita #3; 1–6	East Makushita #14; 2–5	East Makushita #21; 4–3	East Makushita #20; 5–2	West Makushita #13; 4–3
1963	East Makushita #11; 5–2	West Makushita #3; 5–2	West Jūryō #17; 9–6	East Jūryō #15; 8–7	East Jūryō #14; 8–7	East Jūryō #13; 10–5
1964	West Jūryō #3; 10–5	East Jūryō #1; 8–7	East Jūryō #1; 9–6	West Maegashira #14; 6–9	East Jūryō #3; 6–9	East Jūryō #5; 10–5
1965	East Jūryō #1; 9–6	East Maegashira #14; 8–7	East Maegashira #9; Sat out due to injury 0–0–15	West Jūryō #3; Sat out due to injury 0–0–15	West Jūryō #17; Sat out due to injury 0–0–15	East Makushita #18; Sat out due to injury 0–0–7
1966	West Makushita #48; Sat out due to injury 0–0–7	East Makushita #89; Sat out due to injury 0–0–7	East Sandanme #29; 6–1	East Makushita #85; 7–0–P; Champion	West Makushita #2; 4–3	West Makushita #2; 4–3
1967	East Makushita #1; 6–1	West Jūryō #17; 12–3; Champion	West Jūryō #11; 9–6	East Jūryō #7; 6–9	West Jūryō #12; 5–10	West Makushita #3; Retired; 0–0–7
Record given as wins–losses–absences Top division champion Top division runner-up Retired Lower divisions Non-participation Sanshō key: F=Fighting spirit; O=Outstanding performance; T=Technique Also shown: ★=Kinboshi; P=Playoff(s); Divisions: Makuuchi — Jūryō — Makushita — Sandanme — Jonidan — Jonokuchi Makuuchi ranks: Yokozuna — Ōzeki — Sekiwake — Komusubi — Maegashira

== See also ==
- Glossary of sumo terms
- List of past sumo wrestlers
- List of sumo tournament second division champions
