= Asanobori Toshimitsu =

Japanese sumo wrestler (born 1948)

Personal information
- Native name: 朝登 俊光
- Born: Toshiaki Shimofuri; 3 June 1948 (age 78) Yubari, Hokkaidō, Japan
- Height: 1.75 m (5 ft 9 in)
- Weight: 147 kg (324 lb)

Sport
- Sport: Sumo
- Retired: May, 1978
- Heya: Asahiyama
- Record: 578-555-2
- Debut: July, 1963
- Highest rank: Maegashira 2 (January, 1970)
- Elder name: Azumazeki
- Championships: 4 (Jūryō); 1 (Makushita); 1 (Jonokuchi)
- Gold Stars: 1 (Kashiwado)
- Updated on June 2020

Asanobori Toshimitsu (born 3 June 1948 as Toshiaki Shimofuri) is a former sumo wrestler from Yubari, Hokkaidō, Japan. He made his professional debut in July 1963 and reached the top division in March 1969. His highest rank was maegashira 2. Upon retirement from active competition he became an elder in the Japan Sumo Association. He left the Sumo Association in June 1979.

== Career record ==
Asanobori Toshimitsu
Year	January Hatsu basho, Tokyo	March Haru basho, Osaka	May Natsu basho, Tokyo	July Nagoya basho, Nagoya	September Aki basho, Tokyo	November Kyūshū basho, Fukuoka
1963	x	x	x	(Maezumo)	East Jonokuchi #14; 7–0; Champion	East Jonidan #23; 3–4
1964	East Jonidan #40; 6–1	West Sandanme #81; 6–1	East Sandanme #40; 5–2	East Sandanme #10; 4–3	East Makushita #93; 4–3	West Makushita #87; 4–3
1965	West Makushita #78; 4–3	East Makushita #69; 2–5	East Makushita #86; 3–4	West Makushita #92; 6–1	East Makushita #54; 3–4	West Makushita #60; 6–1
1966	West Makushita #36; 4–3	West Makushita #32; 5–2	East Makushita #24; 3–4	East Makushita #30; 3–4	West Makushita #33; 4–3	East Makushita #29; 4–3
1967	East Makushita #24; 5–2	East Makushita #15; 3–4	West Makushita #27; 4–3	East Makushita #19; 7–0; Champion	East Jūryō #12; 9–6	West Jūryō #8; 7–8
1968	West Jūryō #9; 8–7	East Jūryō #8; 8–7	West Jūryō #5; 5–10	East Jūryō #13; 8–7	East Jūryō #10; 8–7	East Jūryō #8; 10–5
1969	West Jūryō #2; 11–4–P; Champion	West Maegashira #10; 8–7	East Maegashira #8; 8–7	East Maegashira #3; 7–8 ★	West Maegashira #4; 7–8	West Maegashira #4; 9–6
1970	East Maegashira #2; 2–13	East Maegashira #11; 8–7	West Maegashira #8; 4–11	West Jūryō #1; 5–10	West Jūryō #7; 5–10	East Jūryō #12; 9–6
1971	West Jūryō #6; 8–7	East Jūryō #5; 8–7	West Jūryō #4; 8–7	East Jūryō #3; 7–8	West Jūryō #4; 6–9	West Jūryō #6; 5–8–2
1972	East Jūryō #13; 11–4	West Jūryō #2; 12–3; Champion	West Maegashira #9; 9–6	East Maegashira #5; 5–10	West Maegashira #10; 6–9	West Maegashira #13; 5–10
1973	West Jūryō #3; 7–8	East Jūryō #6; 8–7	West Jūryō #3; 5–10	East Jūryō #9; 12–3; Champion	East Jūryō #1; 5–10	West Jūryō #7; 8–7
1974	West Jūryō #3; 7–8	West Jūryō #4; 11–4	East Maegashira #12; 4–11	West Jūryō #7; 6–9	East Jūryō #11; 11–4; Champion	East Jūryō #2; 5–10
1975	West Jūryō #8; 8–7	East Jūryō #6; 8–7	East Jūryō #4; 8–7	West Jūryō #2; 6–9	East Jūryō #7; 8–7	East Jūryō #6; 7–8
1976	East Jūryō #8; 8–7	East Jūryō #6; 7–8	West Jūryō #7; 7–8	West Jūryō #8; 8–7	East Jūryō #8; 7–8	West Jūryō #9; 6–9
1977	East Jūryō #13; 9–6	West Jūryō #9; 8–7	East Jūryō #7; 7–8	East Jūryō #10; 8–7	West Jūryō #7; 8–7	East Jūryō #4; 5–10
1978	West Jūryō #10; 7–8	East Makushita #1; 6–1	West Jūryō #10; Retired; 2–13–0	x	x	x
Record given as wins–losses–absences Top division champion Top division runner-up Retired Lower divisions Non-participation Sanshō key: F=Fighting spirit; O=Outstanding performance; T=Technique Also shown: ★=Kinboshi; P=Playoff(s); Divisions: Makuuchi — Jūryō — Makushita — Sandanme — Jonidan — Jonokuchi Makuuchi ranks: Yokozuna — Ōzeki — Sekiwake — Komusubi — Maegashira

== See also ==
- Glossary of sumo terms
- List of past sumo wrestlers
- List of sumo tournament second division champions
