= Tochiisami Yoshiharu =

Japanese sumo wrestler

Personal information
- Native name: 栃勇 義治
- Born: Tetsuo Abe; 2 October 1947 (age 79) Inakadate, Aomori, Japan
- Height: 1.76 m (5 ft 9 1/2 in)
- Weight: 109 kg (240 lb)

Sport
- Sport: Sumo
- Retired: November, 1979
- Heya: Kasugano
- Record: 607-590-23
- Debut: March, 1963
- Highest rank: Maegashira 7 (July, 1970)
- Elder name: Iwatomto
- Championships: 1 (Jūryō); 1 (Makushita)
- Updated on June 2020

Tochiisami Yoshiharu (born 2 October 1947 as Tetsuo Abe) is a former sumo wrestler from Inakadate, Aomori, Japan. He made his professional debut in March 1963, and reached the top division in July 1969. His highest rank was maegashira 7. He retired in November 1979 and became an elder in the Japan Sumo Association under the name Iwatomo. He reached the mandatory retirement age of 65 in October 2012. The Iwatomo name is now owned by former maegashira Kimurayama, also of the Kasugano stable.

== Career record ==
Tochiisami Yoshiharu
Year	January Hatsu basho, Tokyo	March Haru basho, Osaka	May Natsu basho, Tokyo	July Nagoya basho, Nagoya	September Aki basho, Tokyo	November Kyūshū basho, Fukuoka
1963	x	(Maezumo)	West Jonokuchi #16; 5–2	East Jonidan #42; 5–2	West Sandanme #95; 4–3	West Sandanme #62; 2–5
1964	East Sandanme #82; 4–3	West Sandanme #68; 4–3	East Sandanme #55; 3–4	East Sandanme #57; 2–5	West Sandanme #87; 6–1–P	East Sandanme #41; 4–3
1965	West Sandanme #30; 3–4	East Sandanme #41; 5–2	West Sandanme #13; 6–1	West Makushita #73; 2–5	West Makushita #92; 5–2	East Makushita #67; 3–4
1966	East Makushita #73; 4–3	East Makushita #69; 4–3	East Makushita #64; 1–6	West Makushita #89; 4–3	East Makushita #77; 3–4	East Makushita #88; 6–1
1967	East Makushita #57; 4–3	West Makushita #51; 5–2	West Makushita #45; 4–3	West Makushita #35; 5–2	West Makushita #20; 7–0; Champion	East Jūryō #12; 11–4
1968	West Jūryō #4; 10–5	East Jūryō #1; 5–10	West Jūryō #6; 7–8	West Jūryō #7; 7–8	East Jūryō #8; 8–7	East Jūryō #5; 9–6
1969	West Jūryō #1; 5–10	East Jūryō #8; 10–5	East Jūryō #1; 9–6	West Maegashira #10; 5–10	West Jūryō #2; 5–10	West Jūryō #7; 8–7
1970	West Jūryō #4; 8–7	East Jūryō #2; 9–6	West Maegashira #12; 8–7	West Maegashira #7; 6–9	East Maegashira #9; 7–8	West Maegashira #10; 8–7
1971	East Maegashira #7; 0–2–13	East Jūryō #2; 8–7	West Jūryō #1; 6–9	East Jūryō #4; 9–6	West Jūryō #1; 9–6	West Maegashira #11; 8–7
1972	West Maegashira #7; 5–10	West Maegashira #11; 8–7	West Maegashira #8; 5–10	East Jūryō #1; 8–7	West Maegashira #13; 4–8–3	East Jūryō #5; 7–8
1973	West Jūryō #6; 7–8	West Jūryō #10; 8–7	East Jūryō #8; 6–9	East Jūryō #12; 2–6–7	East Makushita #10; 2–5	East Makushita #21; 5–2
1974	West Makushita #10; 6–1	East Makushita #3; 3–4	West Makushita #6; 5–2	West Makushita #2; 3–4	West Makushita #6; 5–2	East Makushita #3; 5–2
1975	West Jūryō #12; 10–5	East Jūryō #4; 8–7	East Jūryō #3; 5–10	West Jūryō #9; 8–7	East Jūryō #9; 8–7	East Jūryō #8; 7–8
1976	West Jūryō #10; 8–7	East Jūryō #9; 7–8	East Jūryō #10; 11–4–P; Champion	West Jūryō #1; 5–10	West Jūryō #9; 6–9	West Jūryō #11; 8–7
1977	West Jūryō #7; 8–7	East Jūryō #6; 7–8	West Jūryō #7; 7–8	West Jūryō #10; 8–7	West Jūryō #8; 9–6	East Jūryō #3; 6–9
1978	West Jūryō #6; 8–7	West Jūryō #4; 6–9	West Jūryō #9; 8–7	East Jūryō #8; 8–7	West Jūryō #4; 8–7	East Jūryō #4; 5–10
1979	East Jūryō #10; 8–7	East Jūryō #8; 8–7	West Jūryō #3; 6–9	East Jūryō #6; 6–9	East Jūryō #10; 8–7	East Jūryō #9; Retired; 3–12
Record given as wins–losses–absences Top division champion Top division runner-up Retired Lower divisions Non-participation Sanshō key: F=Fighting spirit; O=Outstanding performance; T=Technique Also shown: ★=Kinboshi; P=Playoff(s); Divisions: Makuuchi — Jūryō — Makushita — Sandanme — Jonidan — Jonokuchi Makuuchi ranks: Yokozuna — Ōzeki — Sekiwake — Komusubi — Maegashira

== See also ==
- Glossary of sumo terms
- List of past sumo wrestlers
- List of sumo tournament second division champions
