= Chiyozakura Teruo =

Japanese sumo wrestler (born 1950)

Personal information
- Native name: 千代櫻 輝夫
- Born: Teruo Saito; 14 April 1950 (age 76) Imakane, Hokkaidō, Japan
- Height: 1.82 m (5 ft 11 1/2 in)
- Weight: 105 kg (231 lb; 16.5 st)

Sport
- Sport: Sumo
- Retired: May, 1978
- Heya: Dewanoumi → Kokonoe
- Record: 383-369-7
- Debut: March, 1966
- Highest rank: Maegashira 5 (March, 1977)
- Elder name: Fujigane
- Championships: 2 (Jūryō); 1 (Sandanme)
- Updated on June 2020

Chiyozakura Teruo (千代櫻 輝夫; born 14 April 1950 as Teruo Saito) is a former sumo wrestler from Imakane, Hokkaidō, Japan. He made his professional debut in March 1966 and reached the top division in September 1976. His highest rank was maegashira 5. Upon retirement from active competition, he became an elder in the Japan Sumo Association under the name Fujigane. He left the Sumo Association in March 1979.

The wrestler name (shikona) "Chiyozakura" was later used by the jūryō division wrestler Chiyozakura Ukyo from 2010 until 2012.

== Career record ==
Chiyozakura Teruo
Year	January Hatsu basho, Tokyo	March Haru basho, Osaka	May Natsu basho, Tokyo	July Nagoya basho, Nagoya	September Aki basho, Tokyo	November Kyūshū basho, Fukuoka
1966	x	(Maezumo)	West Jonokuchi #21; 4–3	West Jonidan #68; 4–3	East Jonidan #28; 3–4	East Jonidan #40; 3–4
1967	East Jonidan #51; 4–3	East Jonidan #14; 6–1	East Jonidan #16; 3–4	West Jonidan #29; 2–5	West Jonidan #65; 4–3	West Jonidan #37; 6–1
1968	West Sandanme #91; 4–3	East Sandanme #76; 4–3	East Sandanme #56; 5–2	East Sandanme #30; 3–4	West Sandanme #43; 5–2	East Sandanme #12; 5–2
1969	West Makushita #49; 3–4	East Makushita #54; 3–4	West Sandanme #2; 7–0; Champion	East Makushita #15; 3–4	West Makushita #20; 3–4	East Makushita #26; 2–5
1970	East Makushita #41; 3–4	East Makushita #47; 6–1	East Makushita #27; 4–3	West Makushita #21; 2–5	East Makushita #35; 6–1–P	West Makushita #15; 3–4
1971	East Makushita #21; 3–4	East Makushita #27; 4–3	West Makushita #22; 5–2	West Makushita #9; 1–6	West Makushita #34; 3–4	West Makushita #41; 6–1
1972	East Makushita #21; 5–2	West Makushita #8; 4–3	East Makushita #6; 3–4	West Makushita #8; 4–3	West Makushita #5; 4–3	West Makushita #3; 4–3
1973	West Makushita #2; 5–2	East Jūryō #12; 8–7	West Jūryō #10; 8–7	East Jūryō #8; 7–8	West Jūryō #9; 8–7	East Jūryō #8; 6–9
1974	West Jūryō #12; 11–4; Champion	East Jūryō #3; 5–10	West Jūryō #8; 8–7	East Jūryō #7; 6–9	East Jūryō #11; 8–7	West Jūryō #9; 8–7
1975	East Jūryō #7; 6–9	West Jūryō #12; 9–6	West Jūryō #8; 8–7	East Jūryō #5; 8–7	West Jūryō #2; 7–8	West Jūryō #3; 6–9
1976	West Jūryō #6; 7–8	West Jūryō #8; 8–7	West Jūryō #5; 8–7	East Jūryō #3; 10–5	West Maegashira #13; 8–7	West Maegashira #9; 7–8
1977	East Maegashira #10; 8–7	East Maegashira #5; 4–11	East Maegashira #12; 4–11	West Jūryō #5; 8–7	East Jūryō #2; 11–4; Champion	East Maegashira #10; 6–9
1978	West Maegashira #12; 5–10	East Jūryō #5; 1–14	West Makushita #10; Retired –	x	x	x
Record given as wins–losses–absences Top division champion Top division runner-up Retired Lower divisions Non-participation Sanshō key: F=Fighting spirit; O=Outstanding performance; T=Technique Also shown: ★=Kinboshi; P=Playoff(s); Divisions: Makuuchi — Jūryō — Makushita — Sandanme — Jonidan — Jonokuchi Makuuchi ranks: Yokozuna — Ōzeki — Sekiwake — Komusubi — Maegashira

== See also ==
- Glossary of sumo terms
- List of past sumo wrestlers
- List of sumo tournament second division champions
