= Taiga Satoru =

Sumo wrestler

Personal information
- Native name: 大峩 悟
- Born: Satoshi Kawasaki; January 3, 1950 Kanoya, Kagoshima, Japan
- Died: July 16, 2009 (aged 59)
- Height: 1.78 m (5 ft 10 in)
- Weight: 145 kg (320 lb; 22.8 st)

Sport
- Sport: Sumo
- Retired: May, 1977
- Heya: Kimigahama
- Record: 446-446-19
- Debut: March, 1965
- Highest rank: Maegashira 1 (May, 1970)
- Championships: 2 (Jūryō); 1 (Makushita)
- Special Prizes: Technique (1)
- Gold Stars: 2 (Taihō, Kitanoumi)
- Updated on Sep. 2012

Taiga Satoru, born Satoshi Kawasaki (January 3, 1950 – July 16, 2009), was a sumo wrestler from Kanoya, Kagoshima, Japan. He made his professional debut in March 1965, and reached the top division in July 1969. His highest rank was maegashira 1. He left the sumo world upon retirement in May 1977.

== Career record ==
Taiga Satoru
Year	January Hatsu basho, Tokyo	March Haru basho, Osaka	May Natsu basho, Tokyo	July Nagoya basho, Nagoya	September Aki basho, Tokyo	November Kyūshū basho, Fukuoka
1965	x	(Maezumo)	East Jonokuchi #21; 3–4	East Jonokuchi #10; 6–1–P	West Jonidan #83; 4–3	West Jonidan #45; 4–3
1966	East Jonidan #12; 3–4	West Jonidan #24; 4–3	East Jonidan #3; 6–1	East Sandanme #46; 4–3	East Sandanme #24; 4–3	East Makushita #99; 3–4
1967	West Sandanme #9; 4–3	West Makushita #92; 4–3	West Sandanme #21; 4–3	East Sandanme #6; 5–2	East Makushita #44; 5–2	West Makushita #27; 5–2
1968	West Makushita #16; 5–2	East Makushita #11; 5–2	West Makushita #3; 4–3	West Makushita #1; 4–3	East Makushita #1; 7–0; Champion	East Jūryō #6; 6–9
1969	West Jūryō #8; 6–9	West Jūryō #12; 9–6	West Jūryō #8; 12–3; Champion	West Maegashira #12; 9–6	West Maegashira #6; 7–8	West Maegashira #7; 8–7
1970	East Maegashira #4; 7–8	East Maegashira #4; 9–6; T	West Maegashira #1; 6–9 ★	West Maegashira #2; 4–11	East Maegashira #6; 5–10	West Maegashira #11; 8–7
1971	East Maegashira #9; 2–8–5	West Jūryō #1; 10–5	East Maegashira #10; 8–7	East Maegashira #5; 6–9	West Maegashira #8; 10–5	West Maegashira #1; 7–8
1972	East Maegashira #2; 8–7	East Maegashira #1; 5–10	East Maegashira #6; 5–10	West Maegashira #11; 5–10	East Jūryō #2; 6–9	West Jūryō #4; 96–
1973	East Jūryō #1; 5–10	East Jūryō #8; 8–7	East Jūryō #6; 8–7	East Jūryō #4; 6–9	East Jūryō #9; 10–5	East Jūryō #4; 6–9
1974	West Jūryō #8; 7–8	East Jūryō #10; 12–3; Champion	West Jūryō #2; 6–9	West Jūryō #9; 8–7	West Jūryō #4; 7–8	West Jūryō #6; 8–7
1975	West Jūryō #3; 10–5	West Maegashira #13; 9–6	East Maegashira #8; 9–6	East Maegashira #4; 7–8 ★	East Maegashira #5; 8–7	West Maegashira #3; 5–10
1976	East Maegashira #8; 8–7	East Maegashira #6; 5–10	West Maegashira #11; 8–7	West Maegashira #8; 5–10	East Jūryō #1; 4–11	East Jūryō #7; 6–9
1977	East Jūryō #10; 1–14	West Makushita #15; Sat out due to injury 0–0–7	West Makushita #50; Retired; 0–0–7	x	x	x
Record given as wins–losses–absences Top division champion Top division runner-up Retired Lower divisions Non-participation Sanshō key: F=Fighting spirit; O=Outstanding performance; T=Technique Also shown: ★=Kinboshi; P=Playoff(s); Divisions: Makuuchi — Jūryō — Makushita — Sandanme — Jonidan — Jonokuchi Makuuchi ranks: Yokozuna — Ōzeki — Sekiwake — Komusubi — Maegashira

== See also ==
- Glossary of sumo terms
- List of past sumo wrestlers
- List of sumo tournament second division champions
