= Azumanishiki Eizaburo =

Japanese sumo wrestler (1940–1994)

Personal information
- Native name: 東錦 栄三郎
- Born: Eizaburo Hoshino; October 2, 1940 Shinjuku-ku, Tokyo, Japan
- Died: November 9, 1994 (aged 54)
- Height: 1.73 m (5 ft 8 in)
- Weight: 132 kg (291 lb; 20.8 st)

Sport
- Sport: Sumo
- Retired: September, 1967
- Heya: Takasago
- Record: 375-352-13
- Debut: May, 1956
- Highest rank: Maegashira 15 (September, 1962)
- Championships: 1 (Jūryō)
- Updated on Sep. 2012

Azumanishiki Eizaburo (born Eizaburo Hoshino; October 2, 1940 - November 9, 1994) was a sumo wrestler from Shinjuku, Tokyo, Japan. He made his professional debut in September May 1956, and reached the top division in September 1962. His highest rank was maegashira 15. He left the sumo world upon retirement in September 1967.

== Career record ==
- The Kyushu tournament was first held in 1957, and the Nagoya tournament in 1958.

Azumanishiki Eizaburo
Year	January Hatsu basho, Tokyo	March Haru basho, Osaka	May Natsu basho, Tokyo	July Nagoya basho, Nagoya	September Aki basho, Tokyo	November Kyūshū basho, Fukuoka
1956	x	x	(Maezumo)	Not held	West Jonokuchi #23; 4–4	Not held
1957	West Jonidan #101; 3–5	West Jonidan #105; 3–5	East Jonidan #108; 6–2	Not held	West Jonidan #49; 6–2	East Jonidan #3; 6–2
1958	West Sandanme #79; 3–5	East Sandanme #82; 5–2	West Sandanme #67; 4–4	East Sandanme #63; 5–3	East Sandanme #48; 4–4	West Sandanme #46; 6–2
1959	West Sandanme #28; 7–1–P	East Makushita #84; 5–3	East Makushita #76; 7–1–P	West Makushita #50; 6–2	West Makushita #38; 5–3	East Makushita #30; 5–3
1960	East Makushita #27; 5–3	West Makushita #19; 5–3	West Makushita #14; 3–5	West Makushita #20; 3–4	East Makushita #24; 4–3	West Makushita #20; 3–4
1961	East Makushita #25; 2–5	East Makushita #36; 4–3	East Makushita #28; 5–2	West Makushita #18; 4–3	West Makushita #14; 4–3	East Makushita #10; 5–2
1962	East Makushita #3; 6–1	East Jūryō #18; 9–6	East Jūryō #9; 8–7	East Jūryō #5; 11–4–P	East Maegashira #15; 3–12	East Jūryō #8; 9–6
1963	West Jūryō #2; 4–5–6	West Jūryō #7; 6–9	East Jūryō #10; 9–6	East Jūryō #7; 6–9	East Jūryō #9; 7–8	West Jūryō #9; 6–9
1964	West Jūryō #11; 6–9	East Jūryō #15; 10–5	West Jūryō #7; 6–9	West Jūryō #10; 8–7	West Jūryō #6; 6–9	West Jūryō #8; 5–10
1965	East Jūryō #12; 6–9	East Jūryō #17; 7–8	East Jūryō #18; 9–6	West Jūryō #11; 9–6	East Jūryō #5; 5–10	West Jūryō #8; 5–10
1966	West Jūryō #15; 11–4; Champion	West Jūryō #5; 6–9	West Jūryō #8; 6–9	East Jūryō #11; 6–9	East Jūryō #15; 9–6	West Jūryō #6; 7–8
1967	West Jūryō #8; 7–8	East Jūryō #9; 10–5	West Jūryō #7; 6–9	East Jūryō #11; 4–11	East Makushita #3; Retired; 0–0–7	
Record given as wins–losses–absences Top division champion Top division runner-up Retired Lower divisions Non-participation Sanshō key: F=Fighting spirit; O=Outstanding performance; T=Technique Also shown: ★=Kinboshi; P=Playoff(s); Divisions: Makuuchi — Jūryō — Makushita — Sandanme — Jonidan — Jonokuchi Makuuchi ranks: Yokozuna — Ōzeki — Sekiwake — Komusubi — Maegashira

== See also ==
- Glossary of sumo terms
- List of past sumo wrestlers
- List of sumo tournament second division champions
