= Wakatenryū Yuzo =

Japanese sumo wrestler

Personal information
- Native name: 若天龍 裕三
- Born: Tatsuo Nakagawa; 1 January 1940 (age 86) Nakagyō-ku, Kyoto, Japan
- Height: 1.75 m (5 ft 9 in)
- Weight: 106 kg (234 lb)

Sport
- Sport: Sumo
- Retired: July, 1969
- Heya: Hanakago
- Record: 533-493-2
- Debut: March, 1955
- Highest rank: Maegashira 1 (November, 1965)
- Championships: 2 (Jūryō)
- Gold Stars: 1 (Tochinoumi)
- Updated on Sep. 2012

Wakatenryū Yuzo (born 1 January 1940 as Tatsuo Nakagawa) is a former sumo wrestler from Kyōto, Japan. He made his professional debut in March 1955 and reached the top division in September 1961. His highest rank was maegashira 1. He left the sumo world upon retirement from active competition in July 1969.

== Career record ==
- The Kyushu tournament was first held in 1957, and the Nagoya tournament in 1958.

Wakatenryū Yuzo
Year	January Hatsu basho, Tokyo	March Haru basho, Osaka	May Natsu basho, Tokyo	July Nagoya basho, Nagoya	September Aki basho, Tokyo	November Kyūshū basho, Fukuoka
1955	x	Shinjo; 2–1	East Jonidan #77; 4–4	Not held	East Jonidan #67; 4–4	Not held
1956	East Jonidan #57; 4–4	West Jonidan #55; 5–3	West Jonidan #30; 7–1–P	Not held	West Sandanme #86; 5–3	Not held
1957	East Sandanme #65; 3–5	East Sandanme #69; 6–2	West Sandanme #33; 6–2	Not held	West Sandanme #9; 5–3	West Makushita #75; 5–3
1958	East Makushita #70; 5–3	West Makushita #61; 6–2	West Makushita #48; 6–2	West Makushita #30; 3–5	West Makushita #37; 5–3	West Makushita #25; 5–3
1959	East Makushita #18; 5–3	East Makushita #13; 5–3	East Makushita #9; 5–3	West Makushita #5; 7–1–P	East Makushita #1; 3–5	East Makushita #5; 3–5
1960	West Makushita #10; 4–4	East Makushita #8; 6–2	East Makushita #3; 4–4	East Makushita #2; 6–1	West Jūryō #19; 10–5	West Jūryō #12; 6–9
1961	East Jūryō #16; 8–7	East Jūryō #13; 9–6	East Jūryō #7; 9–6	West Jūryō #3; 11–4	West Maegashira #11; 8–7	East Maegashira #9; 7–8
1962	West Maegashira #10; 2–13	East Jūryō #2; 5–10	East Jūryō #8; 9–6	West Jūryō #2; 5–10	East Jūryō #7; 12–3; Champion	West Jūryō #1; 7–8
1963	East Jūryō #2; 10–5	East Maegashira #15; 4–11	East Jūryō #6; 6–9	East Jūryō #12; 9–6	West Jūryō #6; 9–6	West Jūryō #3; 6–9
1964	West Jūryō #5; 13–2–P; Champion	East Maegashira #14; 8–7	East Maegashira #11; 7–8	West Maegashira #12; 8–7	West Maegashira #9; 8–7	East Maegashira #8; 6–9
1965	East Maegashira #11; 7–8	East Maegashira #12; 8–7	West Maegashira #7; 9–6	West Maegashira #4; 8–7	East Maegashira #4; 9–6	East Maegashira #1; 5–10 ★
1966	West Maegashira #6; 9–6	West Maegashira #4; 5–10	West Maegashira #7; 8–7	West Maegashira #5; 5–10	West Maegashira #7; 9–6	East Maegashira #3; 0–13–2
1967	East Maegashira #15; 8–7	West Maegashira #13; 6–9	East Jūryō #5; 8–7	West Jūryō #3; 6–9	West Jūryō #7; 9–6	East Jūryō #4; 11–4
1968	West Maegashira #10; 8–7	East Maegashira #9; 8–7	East Maegashira #8; 6–9	West Maegashira #10; 6–9	East Jūryō #2; 9–6	West Maegashira #12; 8–7
1969	West Maegashira #10; 5–10	West Jūryō #1; 5–10	East Jūryō #8; 6–9	West Jūryō #11; Retired; 6–9–0		
Record given as wins–losses–absences Top division champion Top division runner-up Retired Lower divisions Non-participation Sanshō key: F=Fighting spirit; O=Outstanding performance; T=Technique Also shown: ★=Kinboshi; P=Playoff(s); Divisions: Makuuchi — Jūryō — Makushita — Sandanme — Jonidan — Jonokuchi Makuuchi ranks: Yokozuna — Ōzeki — Sekiwake — Komusubi — Maegashira

== See also ==
- Glossary of sumo terms
- List of past sumo wrestlers
- List of sumo tournament second division champions
