= Iwashita Eiichi =

Japanese sumo wrestler (1955–1999)

Personal information
- Native name: 岩下 栄一
- Born: Eiichi Iwashita; February 15, 1955 Kisarazu, Chiba, Japan
- Died: January 21, 1999 (aged 43)
- Height: 1.80 m (5 ft 11 in)
- Weight: 136 kg (300 lb; 21.4 st)

Sport
- Sport: Sumo
- Retired: March, 1984
- Heya: Tatsunami
- Record: 394-390-23
- Debut: November, 1971
- Highest rank: Maegashira 8 (November, 1979)
- Championships: 1 (Jūryō); 2 (Sandanme)
- Updated on Sep. 2012

Iwashita Eiichi (岩下 栄一, born Eiichi Iwashita; February 15, 1955 – January 21, 1999) was a sumo wrestler from Kisarazu, Chiba, Japan. He made his professional debut in November 1971, and reached the top division in July 1977. His highest rank was maegashira 8. He also fought under the shikona of Terunoyama (照の山) and Iwanami (岩波). He left the sumo world upon retirement in March 1984.

== Career record ==
Iwashita Eiichi
| Year | January Hatsu basho, Tokyo | March Haru basho, Osaka | May Natsu basho, Tokyo | July Nagoya basho, Nagoya | September Aki basho, Tokyo | November Kyūshū basho, Fukuoka |
|---|---|---|---|---|---|---|
| 1971 | x | x | x | x | x | (Maezumo) |
| 1972 | (Maezumo) | West Jonokuchi #5; 6–1 | East Jonidan #27; 3–4 | West Jonidan #38; 6–1 | East Sandanme #72; 6–1 | West Sandanme #29; 4–3 |
| 1973 | East Sandanme #18; 6–1 | West Makushita #41; 3–4 | West Makushita #47; 2–5 | East Sandanme #6; 3–4 | West Sandanme #20; 3–4 | East Sandanme #34; 7–0; Champion |
| 1974 | West Makushita #32; 2–5 | West Makushita #49; 3–4 | West Makushita #60; 2–5 | West Sandanme #18; 7–0–P; Champion | West Makushita #22; 2–5 | West Makushita #40; 4–3 |
| 1975 | West Makushita #30; 3–4 | East Makushita #38; 3–4 | West Makushita #46; 5–2 | East Makushita #31; 6–1 | East Makushita #10; 3–4 | West Makushita #14; 4–3 |
| 1976 | West Makushita #10; 4–3 | West Makushita #7; 5–2 | East Makushita #2; 4–3 | East Makushita #1; 4–3 | East Jūryō #13; 8–7 | East Jūryō #9; 10–5 |
| 1977 | East Jūryō #3; 8–7 | East Jūryō #2; 7–8 | East Jūryō #3; 9–6 | West Maegashira #11; 7–7–1 | East Maegashira #13; Sat out due to injury 0–0–15 | East Maegashira #13; 7–8 |
| 1978 | East Jūryō #1; 7–8 | West Maegashira #12; 4–11 | West Jūryō #7; 9–6 | West Jūryō #3; 10–5–P | East Maegashira #13; 6–9 | East Jūryō #5; 10–5 |
| 1979 | West Maegashira #13; 5–10 | East Jūryō #3; 8–7 | West Jūryō #1; 12–3; Champion | West Maegashira #9; 7–8 | East Maegashira #12; 8–7 | West Maegashira #8; 7–8 |
| 1980 | East Maegashira #9; 7–8 | East Maegashira #11; 8–7 | East Maegashira #8; 7–8 | West Maegashira #9; 5–10 | West Jūryō #2; 4–11 | East Jūryō #8; 10–5 |
| 1981 | East Jūryō #3; 9–6 | East Maegashira #13; 8–7 | East Maegashira #9; 6–9 | East Maegashira #12; 6–9 | East Jūryō #2; 8–7 | West Maegashira #13; 5–10 |
| 1982 | West Jūryō #4; 5–10 | West Jūryō #9; 10–5 | East Jūryō #3; 4–11 | East Jūryō #9; 6–9 | East Jūryō #12; 5–10 | West Makushita #7; 3–4 |
| 1983 | East Makushita #13; 1–6 | East Makushita #37; 2–5 | West Sandanme #2; 3–4 | East Sandanme #18; 5–2 | East Makushita #54; 3–4 | East Sandanme #5; 3–4 |
| 1984 | West Sandanme #16; 1–6 | East Sandanme #49; Retired; 0–0–7 | x | x | x | x |
Record given as wins–losses–absences Top division champion Top division runner-up Retired Lower divisions Non-participation Sanshō key: F=Fighting spirit; O=Outstanding performance; T=Technique Also shown: ★=Kinboshi; P=Playoff(s); Divisions: Makuuchi — Jūryō — Makushita — Sandanme — Jonidan — Jonokuchi Makuuchi ranks: Yokozuna — Ōzeki — Sekiwake — Komusubi — Maegashira

== See also ==
- Glossary of sumo terms
- List of past sumo wrestlers
- List of sumo tournament second division champions
