= Tamakiyama Masanori =

Japanese sumo wrestler

Personal information
- Native name: 玉輝山 正則
- Born: Masanori Hagio; April 29, 1951 (age 75) Maebaru, Fukuoka, Japan
- Height: 1.82 m (5 ft 11 1/2 in)
- Weight: 136 kg (300 lb)

Sport
- Sport: Sumo
- Retired: March, 1984
- Heya: Kataonami
- Record: 652-655-15
- Debut: May, 1964
- Highest rank: Komusubi (July, 1979)
- Championships: 2 (Jūryō); 1 (Makushita)
- Updated on August 2012

Tamakiyama Masanori (born April 29, 1951 as Masanori Hagio) is a former sumo wrestler from Maebaru, Fukuoka, Japan. He reached the rank of komusubi in July 1979 and retired in March 1984.

== Career record ==
Tamakiyama Masanori
Year	January Hatsu basho, Tokyo	March Haru basho, Osaka	May Natsu basho, Tokyo	July Nagoya basho, Nagoya	September Aki basho, Tokyo	November Kyūshū basho, Fukuoka
1964	x	x	(Maezumo)	(Maezumo)	East Jonokuchi #15; 2–5	East Jonokuchi #15; 4–3
1965	West Jonidan #110; 2–5	West Jonidan #122; 3–4	East Jonidan #126; 4–3	West Jonidan #80; 3–4	West Jonidan #86; 2–5	West Jonidan #105; 5–2
1966	West Jonidan #56; 3–4	West Jonidan #59; 3–4	West Jonidan #79; 3–4	East Jonidan #85; 5–2	East Jonidan #34; 4–3	East Sandanme #88; 4–3
1967	East Sandanme #72; 6–1	West Sandanme #23; 2–5	East Sandanme #94; 4–3	East Sandanme #65; 4–3	East Sandanme #49; 4–3	West Sandanme #35; 1–6
1968	East Sandanme #67; 4–3	East Sandanme #52; 5–2	East Sandanme #29; 4–3	East Sandanme #19; 5–2	East Makushita #55; 4–3	East Makushita #47; 3–4
1969	East Makushita #51; 2–5	East Sandanme #9; 2–5	West Sandanme #25; 6–1	East Makushita #54; 3–4	West Sandanme #1; 5–2	East Makushita #43; 3–4
1970	West Makushita #47; 5–2	East Makushita #31; 4–3	West Makushita #26; 2–5	West Makushita #43; 5–2	East Makushita #27; 4–3	West Makushita #22; 4–3
1971	West Makushita #18; 4–3	West Makushita #14; 4–3	East Makushita #13; 5–2	East Makushita #5; 6–1	East Jūryō #12; 9–6	West Jūryō #5; 5–10
1972	West Jūryō #12; 4–11	West Makushita #6; 6–1	East Jūryō #11; 9–6	West Jūryō #6; 7–8	West Jūryō #7; 3–9–3	East Makushita #2; 3–4
1973	East Makushita #9; 4–3	West Makushita #5; 7–0–P; Champion	East Jūryō #10; 4–11	West Makushita #7; 5–2	West Makushita #4; 5–2	East Jūryō #13; 10–5
1974	East Jūryō #5; 7–8	West Jūryō #6; 11–4	East Maegashira #13; 4–11	East Jūryō #8; 7–8	West Jūryō #9; 10–5	West Jūryō #2; 6–9
1975	East Jūryō #6; 10–5	East Jūryō #1; 11–4; Champion	East Maegashira #12; 7–8	East Maegashira #13; 6–9	West Jūryō #1; 9–6	West Maegashira #12; 8–7
1976	East Maegashira #9; 9–6	West Maegashira #3; 6–9	West Maegashira #7; 5–10	West Maegashira #11; 8–7	West Maegashira #8; 9–6	West Maegashira #1; 5–10
1977	West Maegashira #6; 6–9	West Maegashira #10; 3–12	West Jūryō #5; 9–6	East Jūryō #1; 8–7	West Maegashira #12; 6–9	East Jūryō #2; 11–4; Champion
1978	East Maegashira #10; 8–7	East Maegashira #7; 7–8	East Maegashira #9; 9–6	East Maegashira #4; 5–10	East Maegashira #9; 8–7	West Maegashira #7; 8–7
1979	East Maegashira #3; 5–10	East Maegashira #7; 8–7	East Maegashira #4; 8–7	West Komusubi #1; 4–11	East Maegashira #8; 1–2–12	East Jūryō #4; 9–6
1980	East Jūryō #1; 6–9	West Jūryō #7; 6–9	East Jūryō #12; 8–7	West Jūryō #9; 7–8	West Jūryō #11; 7–8	West Jūryō #12; 11–4
1981	West Jūryō #4; 6–9	East Jūryō #9; 8–7	East Jūryō #5; 5–10	East Jūryō #9; 8–7	West Jūryō #8; 4–11	West Makushita #5; 5–2
1982	West Jūryō #12; 8–7	East Jūryō #9; 7–8	East Jūryō #12; 7–8	East Jūryō #13; 6–9	East Makushita #4; 4–3	West Makushita #2; 5–2
1983	East Jūryō #12; 8–7	East Jūryō #11; 7–8	West Jūryō #13; 5–10	West Makushita #7; 2–5	East Makushita #23; 4–3	East Makushita #17; 4–3
1984	East Makushita #10; 2–5	West Makushita #25; Retired; 3–4	x	x	x	x
Record given as wins–losses–absences Top division champion Top division runner-up Retired Lower divisions Non-participation Sanshō key: F=Fighting spirit; O=Outstanding performance; T=Technique Also shown: ★=Kinboshi; P=Playoff(s); Divisions: Makuuchi — Jūryō — Makushita — Sandanme — Jonidan — Jonokuchi Makuuchi ranks: Yokozuna — Ōzeki — Sekiwake — Komusubi — Maegashira

== See also ==
- Glossary of sumo terms
- List of past sumo wrestlers
- List of komusubi
