= Kurama Tatsuya =

Japanese sumo wrestler

Personal information
- Native name: 蔵間 龍也
- Born: Kurama Tatsuya; 16 December 1952 Yasu, Shiga, Japan
- Died: 26 January 1995 (aged 42)
- Height: 1.87 m (6 ft 1 1/2 in)
- Weight: 120 kg (260 lb; 19 st)

Sport
- Sport: Sumo
- Retired: September 1989
- Heya: Tokitsukaze
- Record: 765-788-25
- Debut: September, 1968
- Highest rank: Sekiwake (May, 1978)
- Elder name: Shikoroyama
- Special Prizes: Technique (2); Fighting Spirit (1)
- Gold Stars: 2 Wajima; Wakanohana II
- Updated on June 20201

Kurama Tatsuya (16 December 1952 – 26 January 1995) was a sumo wrestler from Yasu, Shiga Prefecture, Japan. He made his professional debut in 1968, reaching the top makuuchi division in 1976. His highest rank was sekiwake and he won three special prizes and two kinboshi. He was well-known for his good looks and flamboyant personal life. After retiring in 1989 he became a sumo elder for a short time before leaving the Japan Sumo Association to work as a commentator and television personality. He died of leukemia in 1995.

== Career ==
At junior high and at high school he did swimming and rugby, but was especially proficient at judo. He made his debut for the Tokitsukaze stable in September 1968. He was called the "last disciple of Futabayama," as the great yokozuna who had founded the stable died at the end of the year. His stable master for most of the rest of his career was the former ōzeki Yutakayama. He fought under his real name for his entire career, never adopting a traditional shikona. He was restricted by back problems early in his career, and it took him 40 tournaments from his professional debut to reach the sekitori ranks, but once he got there he was regarded as extremely promising. Emperor Showa, a fan of sumo, asked in Kuruma's jūryō debut of the tournament director Kasugano (ex-yokozuna Tochinishiki) how far he could go, to which Kasugano responded, "ōzeki".

He made the top makuuchi division in July 1976, and was ranked there for 62 tournaments in total. He won his first sansho or special prize for Fighting Spirit in January 1978, and in the following tournament in March 1978 made his sanyaku debut at komusubi. In this tournament he defeated ozeki Takanohana and Mienoumi and won his first Technique prize. In May he reached what was to be highest rank of sekiwake, which he held for just one tournament. He won his second Technique prize in May 1981 and reached the komusubi rank on several more occasions, but was never to return to the sekiwake rank. He earned two kinboshi for defeating yokozuna as a maegashira (Wajima in September 1978 and Wakanohana in May 1981). However, those were his only two wins against yokozuna in 44 attempts, and he was unable to defeat Kitanoumi in 17 bouts. His final appearance in the top division was in May 1988. For much of his top division career he had been the only Shiga Prefecture native, but his demotion coincided with the beginning of Shiga-born Misugisato's top division career.

Kurama was a highly popular wrestler, and was regarded as one of the most handsome rikishi of his time (alongside Wakanohana II). His failure to make ōzeki (for which Kasugano eventually apologized to the Emperor for making an incorrect prediction) was put down to Kurama's flashy personal life, which included driving Lincoln Continentals, spending a million yen a night going out, building a mansion named after himself in Ichikawa, and marrying the actress Yayoi Watanabe. He was also involved in an accident in 1985 when he crashed into two cars waiting at a traffic light, which contributed to the Sumo Association introducing a ban on wrestlers driving.

== Retirement from sumo ==
He retired in September 1989, and was the oldest man in any of the professional sumo divisions at the time. His retirement followed a diagnosis of chronic myelogenous leukemia. He became an elder of the Japan Sumo Association under the name Shikoroyama, but left his role in 1990 due to ill health. He became a tarento, wrote a number of sumo books and was a sumo commentator. At this time there was a boom in sumo's popularity generated by the rise of the Takahanada and Wakahanada brothers. During this period his illness was kept secret from the public and known only to close relatives. A bone marrow transplant was a possibility, with his brother a match, but also risky with only a 50 percent success rate and immediate death if a failure, and so he decided to continue with chemotherapy instead.

== Death ==
He died of leukemia in January 1995 at the age of 42. His wife wrote a best-selling book about their struggles with his illness, which was also turned into a TV drama. She continues to operate a chankonabe restaurant called Chanko Kurama in Chiba Prefecture. Kurama’s older brother runs a different restaurant with the same name in Ritto.

== Fighting style ==
He was a yotsu-sumo wrestler, who preferred fighting on mawashi or belt with a hidari-yotsu or right hand outside grip. His favourite techniques or kimarite were yori-kiri (force out) and uwatenage (overarm throw).

== Career record ==
Kurama Tatsuya
Year	January Hatsu basho, Tokyo	March Haru basho, Osaka	May Natsu basho, Tokyo	July Nagoya basho, Nagoya	September Aki basho, Tokyo	November Kyūshū basho, Fukuoka
1968	x	x	x	x	(Maezumo)	West Jonokuchi #7; 5–2
1969	East Jonidan #38; 4–3	East Jonidan #16; 4–3	East Sandanme #97; 3–4	West Jonidan #4; 5–2	West Sandanme #57; 4–3	East Sandanme #45; 1–6
1970	East Sandanme #77; 3–4	East Sandanme #86; 4–3	East Sandanme #65; 4–3	East Sandanme #43; 3–4	East Sandanme #53; 6–1	East Sandanme #19; 4–3
1971	East Sandanme #8; 4–3	East Makushita #58; 5–2	East Makushita #37; 2–5	West Makushita #57; 2–5	West Sandanme #22; 6–1	West Makushita #44; 4–3
1972	East Makushita #39; 5–2	East Makushita #23; 4–3	West Makushita #20; 4–3	West Makushita #17; 2–5	West Makushita #29; 4–3	East Makushita #26; 6–1
1973	West Makushita #11; 4–3	East Makushita #7; 4–3	East Makushita #4; 1–6	East Makushita #23; 4–3	West Makushita #16; 4–3	West Makushita #14; 4–3
1974	East Makushita #11; 4–3	East Makushita #9; 4–3	East Makushita #5; 3–4	East Makushita #11; 5–2	West Makushita #3; 4–3	West Makushita #2; 3–4
1975	West Makushita #6; 6–1	West Makushita #1; 5–2	East Jūryō #12; 9–6	West Jūryō #6; 6–9	West Jūryō #10; 8–7	West Jūryō #9; 9–6
1976	East Jūryō #3; 7–8	East Jūryō #4; 7–8	East Jūryō #6; 11–4–P	East Maegashira #13; 6–9	West Jūryō #3; 4–11	West Jūryō #8; 9–6
1977	West Jūryō #3; 9–6	East Jūryō #1; 10–5	West Maegashira #10; 8–7	East Maegashira #7; 8–7	West Maegashira #3; 5–10	West Maegashira #7; 9–6
1978	West Maegashira #3; 10–5; F	East Komusubi #1; 8–7; T	West Sekiwake #1; 3–12	West Maegashira #7; 9–6	West Maegashira #1; 8–7 ★	East Maegashira #1; 6–9
1979	East Maegashira #5; 8–7	East Maegashira #2; 7–8	East Maegashira #3; 6–9	East Maegashira #5; 8–7	East Maegashira #1; Sat out due to injury 0–0–15	West Maegashira #12; 8–7
1980	West Maegashira #6; 5–10	West Maegashira #13; 8–7	East Maegashira #10; 8–7	East Maegashira #7; 8–7	West Maegashira #4; 4–11	West Maegashira #10; 8–7
1981	East Maegashira #7; 9–6	West Maegashira #1; 8–7	East Maegashira #1; 9–6; T★	East Komusubi #1; 8–7	East Komusubi #1; 6–9	West Maegashira #2; 4–11
1982	West Maegashira #10; 7–8	East Maegashira #11; 8–7	West Maegashira #7; 8–7	West Maegashira #3; 4–11	East Maegashira #10; 8–7	West Maegashira #5; 8–7
1983	West Maegashira #1; 5–10	West Maegashira #6; 8–7	East Komusubi #1; 4–11	West Maegashira #4; 8–7	East Komusubi #1; 5–10	West Maegashira #4; 6–9
1984	East Maegashira #7; 8–7	West Maegashira #1; 4–11	East Maegashira #7; 9–6	West Komusubi #1; 4–11	East Maegashira #6; 8–7	East Maegashira #2; 6–9
1985	East Maegashira #6; 8–7	East Maegashira #2; 4–11	East Maegashira #10; 9–6	West Maegashira #4; 6–9	East Maegashira #8; 6–9	West Maegashira #13; 9–6
1986	East Maegashira #6; 7–8	West Maegashira #8; 7–8	East Maegashira #12; 8–7	East Maegashira #8; 6–9	West Maegashira #12; 7–8	East Jūryō #1; 8–7
1987	East Maegashira #13; 8–7	West Maegashira #9; 6–9	East Maegashira #13; 7–8	East Jūryō #1; 6–9	West Jūryō #5; 9–6	East Jūryō #3; 6–9
1988	West Jūryō #6; 8–7	East Jūryō #4; 11–4	East Maegashira #13; 6–9	East Jūryō #2; 6–9	East Jūryō #7; 8–7	West Jūryō #4; 5–10
1989	West Jūryō #9; 9–6	West Jūryō #4; 8–7	East Jūryō #2; 6–9	West Jūryō #6; 8–7	West Jūryō #4; Retired; 1–4–10	x
Record given as wins–losses–absences Top division champion Top division runner-up Retired Lower divisions Non-participation Sanshō key: F=Fighting spirit; O=Outstanding performance; T=Technique Also shown: ★=Kinboshi; P=Playoff(s); Divisions: Makuuchi — Jūryō — Makushita — Sandanme — Jonidan — Jonokuchi Makuuchi ranks: Yokozuna — Ōzeki — Sekiwake — Komusubi — Maegashira

== See also ==
- Glossary of sumo terms
- List of past sumo wrestlers
- List of sumo elders
- List of sekiwake
