= Gojōrō Katsuhiro =

Sumo wrestler

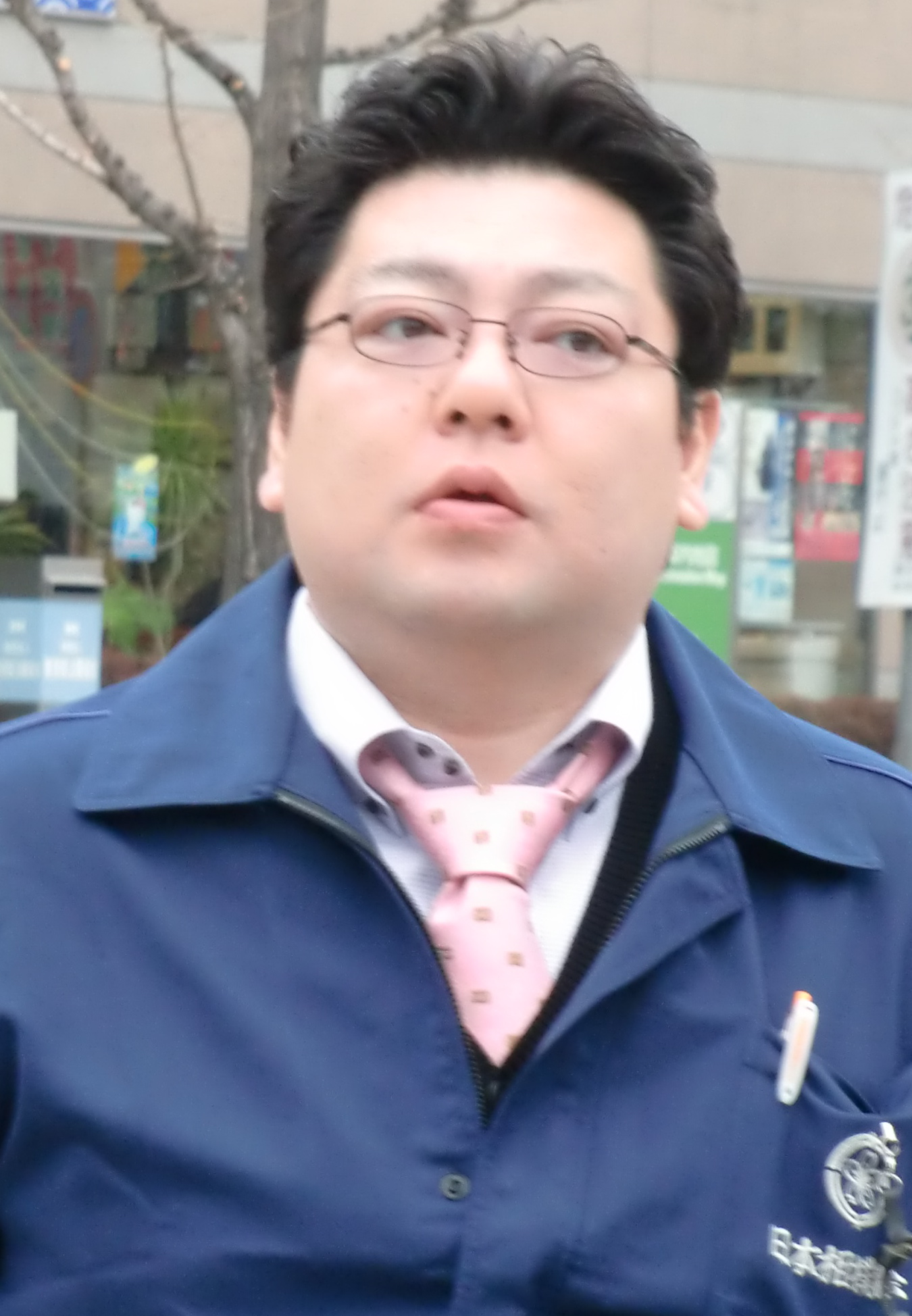

Personal information
- Born: Akitomo Kojima; 18 August 1973 (age 53) Sendai, Japan
- Height: 1.90 m (6 ft 3 in)
- Weight: 147 kg (324 lb)

Sport
- Sport: Sumo
- Retired: November 2005
- Heya: Magaki
- Record: 504-446-146
- Debut: November 1989
- Highest rank: Maegashira 3 (July 1998)
- Elder name: Hamakaze
- Championships: 2 (Makushita); 1 (Sandanme); 1 (Jonidan)
- Updated on January 2010

Gojōrō Katsuhiro (born 18 August 1973 as Akitomo Kojima) is a former sumo wrestler from Aoba-ku, Sendai, Japan. Making his professional debut in 1989, he spent a total of 53 tournaments as an elite sekitori ranked wrestler, reaching a highest rank of maegashira 3 in 1998. After a number of injury problems he retired in 2005 at the age of 32. He is now a sumo coach under the name Hamakaze-oyakata.

== Career ==
As a teenager he did judo and fencing. He was recruited by former yokozuna Wakanohana of the Magaki stable. He made his debut in November 1989 at the age of 16. After very briefly having shikona based on his own surname of Kojima, in 1990 he was given the name Wakasenryū, which was modified to Wakatenryū in the following year. In January 1992 he reached the third highest makushita division, although he was able to score only two wins and five losses. He responded with his first ever yūshō, a perfect 7–0 record in sandanme, which earned him immediate promotion back to makushita. However, in 1993 he missed four successive tournaments, which saw him drop all the way down to the rank of jonidan 52.

After another shikona change to Gojōrō, he returned to the dohyō in November 1993, winning 14 straight bouts and quick promotion back to makushita. In May 1995 a 6–1 performance at the rank of makushita 4 saw him promoted to the jūryō division for the first time, alongside his stablemate, the Hawaiian born Yamato. He moved steadily up the division, and an 8–7 score at jūryō 1 in January 1997 was enough to see him promoted to the top makuuchi division in March. He dropped to jūryō after three tournaments but returned to makuuchi in January 1998 and a fine performance in May, when he recovered from 3–6 down to score 9–6, saw him promoted to his highest ever rank of maegashira 3 for the July 1998 basho. However, he was pitched against all the top ranked wrestlers for the first time, including three yokozuna and two ōzeki, and he finished with a 3–12 record.

In 1999 Gojōrō slipped back into the jūryō division, and he suffered a number of injury problems over the next couple of years. He went 4–4–7, 0–0–15, 7–7–1, 0–0–15 in the four tournaments from September 1999 to March 2000, but due to the kōshō seido (public injury) system he was able to stay in jūryō. However, yet another withdrawal in the September 2000 tournament on Day 5 saw him demoted back to makushita. It took him some time to recover from his injuries and return to the top ranks, but he collected two makushita yūshō on the way (both perfect 7–0 scores), and in September 2002 he finally returned to makuuchi after twenty tournaments away. He climbed to maegashira 4 in November 2002, and fought three ōzeki, but was unable to beat any and finished on 4–11.

Gojoro's return to makuuchi was unfortunately short-lived, as yet more injury problems struck him in July 2003, when he was forced to pull out on Day 8 with only four wins and was demoted back to jūryō. Sitting out the September 2003 basho, he returned in November but had a disastrous tournament. Not only did he become the first wrestler in sumo history to suffer hansoku (disqualification) twice in one basho after he was judged to have pulled the topknot of Kokkai on Day 4 and Ushiomaru on Day 6, but he was injured again on Day 8 and had to pull out. He missed the January 2004 tournament as well, but the public injury system once again kept him at sekitori level. He was one of the last wrestlers to benefit from it as the system was abolished after this tournament.

He struggled on in jūryō until May 2005, when on Day 7 he was injured during a bout with Kotokasuga that was declared too close to call. Unable to take part in the rematch, he lost by default and was unable to compete the next day as well. He thus became the first wrestler since Fujinoshin in September 1989 to lose by default two days in a row. He did return to the tournament, only to drop out again after his eighth loss on Day 12. Demoted to makushita once again, he fought only four more matches before finally announcing his retirement in November 2005.

== Retirement from sumo ==
Staying in the sumo world as a coach at his stable, he was allowed to use his old fighting name as his toshiyori or elder name for a year, giving him time to acquire full stock. In November 2006 he switched to the Hamakaze name after it was vacated by the former Misugisato. Faced with a stable that was deteriorating due to the poor health of Magaki-oyakata, in November 2007 he transferred to another stable in the same ichimon, Sadogatake, and took up coaching duties there.

== Fighting style ==
Gojōrō used both yotsu-sumo (grappling) and oshi-sumo (pushing) techniques. He preferred a hidari-yotsu (right hand outside, left hand inside) grip on his opponent's mawashi, and often won by yorikiri or force out. However, his three most regularly used kimarite were oshidashi (push out), hatakikomi (slap down) and tsukidashi (thrust out).

== Career record ==
Gojōrō Katsuhiro
Year	January Hatsu basho, Tokyo	March Haru basho, Osaka	May Natsu basho, Tokyo	July Nagoya basho, Nagoya	September Aki basho, Tokyo	November Kyūshū basho, Fukuoka
1989	x	x	x	x	x	(Maezumo)
1990	East Jonokuchi #39; 6–1	East Jonidan #91; 3–4	West Jonidan #117; 6–1	East Jonidan #42; 3–4	West Jonidan #61; 6–1	East Sandanme #98; 4–3
1991	West Sandanme #72; 3–4	West Sandanme #90; 4–3	East Sandanme #68; 5–2	West Sandanme #38; 4–3	East Sandanme #23; 4–3	East Sandanme #8; 5–2
1992	West Makushita #48; 2–5	East Sandanme #11; 7–0; Champion	East Makushita #10; 2–5	West Makushita #21; 4–3	East Makushita #15; 2–5	East Makushita #32; 5–2
1993	West Makushita #18; 5–2	East Makushita #10; Sat out due to injury 0–0–7	West Makushita #51; Sat out due to injury 0–0–7	East Sandanme #31; Sat out due to injury 0–0–7	West Sandanme #91; Sat out due to injury 0–0–7	East Jonidan #52; 7–0; Champion
1994	East Sandanme #53; 7–0	East Makushita #35; 4–3	West Makushita #25; 4–3	East Makushita #19; 4–3	West Makushita #14; 5–2	West Makushita #11; 5–2
1995	East Makushita #4; 3–4	East Makushita #9; 5–2	East Makushita #4; 6–1	West Jūryō #12; 8–7	West Jūryō #11; 9–6	West Jūryō #8; 6–9
1996	West Jūryō #10; 9–6	West Jūryō #7; 9–6	West Jūryō #4; 7–8	West Jūryō #5; 7–8	West Jūryō #6; 10–5	East Jūryō #2; 9–6
1997	West Jūryō #1; 8–7	East Maegashira #16; 8–7	West Maegashira #13; 7–8	East Maegashira #15; 4–11	West Jūryō #3; 9–6	East Jūryō #1; 8–7
1998	East Maegashira #16; 9–6	West Maegashira #13; 9–6	East Maegashira #7; 9–6	East Maegashira #3; 3–12	West Maegashira #9; 6–9	West Maegashira #13; 8–7
1999	East Maegashira #10; 7–8	East Maegashira #12; 6–9	East Jūryō #2; 7–8	East Jūryō #4; 8–7	East Jūryō #2; 4–4–7	East Jūryō #8; Sat out due to injury 0–0–15
2000	East Jūryō #8; 7–7–1	Jūryō #9; Sat out due to injury 0–0–15	West Jūryō #9; 6–9	East Jūryō #12; 9–6	West Jūryō #6; 1–4–10	East Makushita #5; Sat out due to injury 0–0–7
2001	East Makushita #5; 3–4	East Makushita #9; 3–4	West Makushita #15; 3–4	East Makushita #22; 7–0; Champion	West Makushita #1; 6–1	East Jūryō #10; 6–9
2002	West Jūryō #13; 7–8	East Makushita #1; 7–0; Champion	East Jūryō #8; 11–4	West Jūryō #1; 10–5	West Maegashira #9; 8–7	West Maegashira #4; 4–11
2003	West Maegashira #10; 5–10	East Maegashira #14; 9–6	West Maegashira #8; 7–8	East Maegashira #9; 4–4–7	West Jūryō #1; Sat out due to injury 0–0–15	West Jūryō #1; 3–6–6
2004	East Jūryō #7; Sat out due to injury 0–0–15	East Jūryō #7; 7–8	West Jūryō #7; 7–8	East Jūryō #8; 7–8	East Jūryō #9; 11–4	West Jūryō #2; 9–6
2005	West Jūryō #1; 4–11	West Jūryō #6; 5–10	West Jūryō #10; 3–8–4	East Makushita #4; 2–3–2	West Makushita #15; Sat out due to injury 0–0–7	West Makushita #55; Retired; 0–0–3
Record given as wins–losses–absences Top division champion Top division runner-up Retired Lower divisions Non-participation Sanshō key: F=Fighting spirit; O=Outstanding performance; T=Technique Also shown: ★=Kinboshi; P=Playoff(s); Divisions: Makuuchi — Jūryō — Makushita — Sandanme — Jonidan — Jonokuchi Makuuchi ranks: Yokozuna — Ōzeki — Sekiwake — Komusubi — Maegashira

== See also ==
- Glossary of sumo terms
- List of past sumo wrestlers
- List of sumo elders
