= 1997 in sumo =

The following were the events in professional sumo during 1997.

== Tournaments ==
=== Hatsu basho ===
Ryogoku Kokugikan, Tokyo, 12 January – 26 January

1997 Hatsu basho results - Makuuchi Division
W		L		A	East			Rank	West			W		L		A
12	-	3	-	0		(United States)	**Akebono**	Y		(Japan)	**Takanohana**	13	-	2	-	0
14	-	1	-	0		(Japan)	**Wakanohana**	O		(United States)	**Musashimaru**	12	-	3	-	0
6	-	9	-	0		(Japan)	Takanonami	O	ø							
6	-	9	-	0		(Japan)	Kaiō	S		(Japan)	Kotonishiki	4	-	11	-	0
8	-	7	-	0		(Japan)	**Musōyama**	K		(Japan)	Akinoshima	6	-	9	-	0
9	-	6	-	0		(Japan)	**Tosanoumi**	M1		(Japan)	**Takatōriki**	11	-	4	-	0
5	-	10	-	0		(Japan)	Tamakasuga	M2		(Japan)	Kenkō	6	-	9	-	0
4	-	11	-	0		(Japan)	Asahiyutaka	M3		(Mongolia)	**Kyokushūzan**	9	-	6	-	0
4	-	11	-	0		(Japan)	Tochinowaka	M4		(Japan)	Higonoumi	5	-	10	-	0
5	-	10	-	0		(Japan)	Asanowaka	M5		(Japan)	Kitakachidoki	6	-	9	-	0
4	-	11	-	0		(Japan)	Oginishiki	M6		(Japan)	**Kotonowaka**	8	-	7	-	0
6	-	9	-	0		(Japan)	Aogiyama	M7		(Japan)	**Asanosho**	8	-	7	-	0
7	-	8	-	0		(Japan)	Mitoizumi	M8		(Japan)	**Terao**	8	-	7	-	0
6	-	9	-	0		(Japan)	Hamanoshima	M9		(Japan)	Minatofuji	6	-	9	-	0
6	-	9	-	0		(Japan)	Daihishō	M10		(Japan)	**Tochiazuma**	9	-	6	-	0
8	-	7	-	0		(Japan)	**Daishi**	M11		(Japan)	**Kotoryū**	10	-	5	-	0
8	-	7	-	0		(Japan)	**Ganyū**	M12		(Japan)	**Kotoinazuma**	8	-	7	-	0
8	-	7	-	0		(United States)	**Konishiki**	M13		(Japan)	**Rikiō**	8	-	7	-	0
2	-	2	-	11	ø	(Japan)	Daishōhō	M14		(United States)	**Yamato**	8	-	7	-	0
9	-	6	-	0		(Japan)	**Shikishima**	M15		(Japan)	**Misugisato**	8	-	7	-	0
5	-	10	-	0		(Japan)	Kotobeppu	M16	ø							

ø - Indicates a pull-out or absent rank
**winning record in bold**
**Yusho Winner**

=== Haru basho ===
Osaka Prefectural Gymnasium, Osaka, 9 March – 23 March

1997 Haru basho results - Makuuchi Division
W		L		A	East			Rank	West			W		L		A
12	-	3	-	0		(Japan)	**Takanohana***	Y		(United States)	**Akebono**	12	-	3	-	0
3	-	1	-	11	ø	(Japan)	Wakanohana	O		(United States)	**Musashimaru**	12	-	3	-	0
11	-	4	-	0		(Japan)	**Takanonami**	O	ø							
7	-	8	-	0		(Japan)	Musōyama	S		(Japan)	Takatōriki	7	-	8	-	0
8	-	7	-	0		(Japan)	**Tosanoumi**	K		(Mongolia)	Kyokushūzan	4	-	11	-	0
12	-	3	-	0		(Japan)	**Kaiō**	M1	ø	(Japan)	Kotonowaka	2	-	10	-	3
7	-	8	-	0		(Japan)	Akinoshima	M2		(Japan)	Asanosho	7	-	8	-	0
2	-	12	-	1	ø	(Japan)	Terao	M3		(Japan)	**Kotonishiki**	8	-	7	-	0
5	-	10	-	0		(Japan)	Kotoryū	M4		(Japan)	Tochiazuma	6	-	9	-	0
4	-	11	-	0		(Japan)	Kenkō	M5		(Japan)	Daishi	5	-	10	-	0
10	-	5	-	0		(Japan)	**Tamakasuga**	M6		(Japan)	Ganyū	7	-	8	-	0
6	-	9	-	0		(Japan)	Kitakachidoki	M7		(Japan)	Kotoinazuma	7	-	8	-	0
6	-	9	-	0		(Japan)	Asahiyutaka	M8		(Japan)	Higonoumi	7	-	8	-	0
8	-	7	-	0		(Japan)	**Asanowaka**	M9		(Japan)	**Tochinowaka**	9	-	6	-	0
8	-	7	-	0		(Japan)	**Mitoizumi**	M10	ø	(United States)	Konishiki	6	-	7	-	2
8	-	7	-	0		(Japan)	**Aogiyama**	M11		(Japan)	**Shikishima**	8	-	7	-	0
6	-	9	-	0		(Japan)	Rikiō	M12		(United States)	Yamato	7	-	8	-	0
11	-	4	-	0		(Japan)	**Dejima**	M13		(Japan)	**Hamanoshima**	8	-	7	-	0
8	-	7	-	0		(Japan)	**Minatofuji**	M14		(Japan)	Misugisato	4	-	11	-	0
11	-	4	-	0		(Japan)	**Oginishiki**	M15		(Japan)	Daihishō	6	-	9	-	0
8	-	7	-	0		(Japan)	**Gojōrō**	M16	ø							

ø - Indicates a pull-out or absent rank
**winning record in bold**
**Yusho Winner**
***Won 3-Way Playoff**

==== Playoff ====
(Lots are drawn. Four rikishi face in semifinals. The winners face each other for the Playoff and the yūshō)

- Match 1: Takanohana defeated Kaiō.
- Match 2: Akebono defeated Musashimaru.
- Match 3: Takanohana defeated Akebono.

=== Natsu basho ===
Ryogoku Kokugikan, Tokyo, 11 May – 25 May

1997 Natsu basho results - Makuuchi Division
W		L		A	East			Rank	West			W		L		A
13	-	2	-	0		(Japan)	**Takanohana**	Y		(United States)	**Akebono***	13	-	2	-	0
9	-	6	-	0		(United States)	**Musashimaru**	O		(Japan)	**Takanonami**	10	-	5	-	0
0	-	0	-	15	ø	(Japan)	Wakanohana	O	ø							
7	-	5	-	3	ø	(Japan)	Kaiō	S		(Japan)	**Tosanoumi**	10	-	5	-	0
6	-	9	-	0		(Japan)	Musōyama	K		(Japan)	Takatōriki	6	-	9	-	0
8	-	7	-	0		(Japan)	**Tamakasuga**	M1		(Japan)	Kotonishiki	5	-	10	-	0
5	-	10	-	0		(Japan)	Tochinowaka	M2		(Japan)	Akinoshima	7	-	8	-	0
5	-	10	-	0		(Japan)	Asanosho	M3		(Japan)	Dejima	7	-	8	-	0
5	-	10	-	0		(Japan)	Asanowaka	M4		(Mongolia)	Kyokushūzan	2	-	13	-	0
4	-	11	-	0		(Japan)	Mitoizumi	M5		(Japan)	**Oginishiki**	11	-	4	-	0
11	-	4	-	0		(Japan)	**Tochiazuma**	M6		(Japan)	**Aogiyama**	8	-	7	-	0
7	-	8	-	0		(Japan)	Ganyū	M7		(Japan)	Shikishima	6	-	9	-	0
5	-	10	-	0		(Japan)	Kotoryū	M8		(Japan)	**Kotoinazuma**	8	-	7	-	0
5	-	10	-	0		(Japan)	Daishi	M9		(Japan)	**Higonoumi**	8	-	7	-	0
6	-	9	-	0		(Japan)	Hamanoshima	M10		(Japan)	**Kotonowaka**	8	-	7	-	0
8	-	7	-	0		(Japan)	**Kenkō**	M11		(Japan)	Kitakachidoki	7	-	8	-	0
8	-	7	-	0		(Japan)	**Minatofuji**	M12		(Japan)	**Asahiyutaka**	9	-	6	-	0
0	-	0	-	15	ø	(Japan)	Terao	M13		(Japan)	Gojōrō	7	-	8	-	0
8	-	7	-	0		(United States)	**Konishiki**	M14		(United States)	Yamato	7	-	8	-	0
9	-	6	-	0		(Japan)	**Mainoumi**	M15		(Japan)	**Rikiō**	8	-	7	-	0
9	-	6	-	0		(Japan)	**Tochinonada**	M16	ø							

ø - Indicates a pull-out or absent rank
**winning record in bold**
**Yusho Winner**
***Won Playoff**

=== Nagoya basho ===
Aichi Prefectural Gymnasium, Nagoya, 6 July – 20 July

1997 Nagoya basho results - Makuuchi Division
W		L		A	East			Rank	West			W		L		A
13	-	2	-	0		(Japan)	**Takanohana**	Y		(United States)	**Akebono**	12	-	3	-	0
9	-	6	-	0		(Japan)	**Takanonami**	O		(United States)	**Musashimaru**	10	-	5	-	0
8	-	7	-	0		(Japan)	**Wakanohana**	O	ø							
8	-	7	-	0		(Japan)	**Tosanoumi**	S		(Japan)	Tamakasuga	7	-	8	-	0
4	-	11	-	0		(Japan)	Oginishiki	K	ø	(Japan)	Kaiō	0	-	0	-	15
					ø			K		(Japan)	**Tochiazuma**	9	-	6	-	0
9	-	6	-	0		(Japan)	**Musōyama**	M1		(Japan)	**Takatōriki**	11	-	4	-	0
6	-	9	-	0		(Japan)	Aogiyama	M2		(Japan)	Kotoinazuma	5	-	10	-	0
6	-	9	-	0		(Japan)	Akinoshima	M3		(Japan)	Higonoumi	2	-	13	-	0
8	-	7	-	0		(Japan)	**Dejima**	M4		(Japan)	Kotonowaka	6	-	9	-	0
5	-	10	-	0		(Japan)	Kotonishiki	M5		(Japan)	Asahiyutaka	6	-	9	-	0
5	-	10	-	0		(Japan)	Tochinowaka	M6	ø	(Japan)	Kenkō	0	-	0	-	15
7	-	8	-	0		(Japan)	Asanosho	M7		(Japan)	Minatofuji	7	-	8	-	0
7	-	8	-	0		(Japan)	Asanowaka	M8		(Japan)	**Ganyū**	8	-	7	-	0
5	-	10	-	0		(Japan)	Mainoumi	M9		(United States)	**Konishiki**	8	-	7	-	0
8	-	7	-	0		(Japan)	**Mitoizumi**	M10		(Japan)	**Shikishima**	8	-	7	-	0
10	-	5	-	0		(Japan)	**Tochinonada**	M11		(Mongolia)	**Kyokushūzan**	9	-	6	-	0
9	-	6	-	0		(Japan)	**Rikiō**	M12		(Japan)	**Kotoryū**	8	-	7	-	0
9	-	6	-	0		(Japan)	**Terao**	M13		(Japan)	Kitakachidoki	7	-	8	-	0
9	-	6	-	0		(Japan)	**Hamanoshima**	M14	ø	(Japan)	Daishi	2	-	4	-	9
4	-	11	-	0		(Japan)	Gojōrō	M15		(United States)	Yamato	6	-	9	-	0

ø - Indicates a pull-out or absent rank
**winning record in bold**
**Yusho Winner**

=== Aki basho ===
Ryogoku Kokugikan, Tokyo, 7 September – 21 September

1997 Aki basho results - Makuuchi Division
W		L		A	East			Rank	West			W		L		A
13	-	2	-	0		(Japan)	**Takanohana***	Y		(United States)	**Akebono**	9	-	6	-	0
13	-	2	-	0		(United States)	**Musashimaru**	O		(Japan)	**Takanonami**	12	-	3	-	0
12	-	3	-	0		(Japan)	**Wakanohana**	O	ø							
5	-	10	-	0		(Japan)	Tosanoumi	S		(Japan)	**Tochiazuma**	10	-	5	-	0
					ø			S		(Japan)	**Takatōriki**	9	-	6	-	0
0	-	3	-	12	ø	(Japan)	Musōyama	K	ø	(Japan)	Kaiō	0	-	0	-	15
					ø			K		(Japan)	Tamakasuga	6	-	9	-	0
11	-	4	-	0		(Japan)	**Dejima**	M1		(Japan)	Ganyū	3	-	12	-	0
9	-	6	-	0		(Japan)	**Tochinonada**	M2	ø	(United States)	Konishiki	0	-	11	-	4
0	-	0	-	15	ø	(Japan)	Oginishiki	M3		(Mongolia)	Kyokushūzan	3	-	12	-	0
3	-	12	-	0		(Japan)	Aogiyama	M4	ø	(Japan)	Rikiō	0	-	0	-	15
8	-	7	-	0		(Japan)	**Akinoshima**	M5		(Japan)	Kotoinazuma	6	-	9	-	0
5	-	10	-	0		(Japan)	Mitoizumi	M6		(Japan)	Kotonowaka	6	-	9	-	0
6	-	9	-	0		(Japan)	Shikishima	M7		(Japan)	**Asahiyutaka**	8	-	7	-	0
4	-	7	-	4	ø	(Japan)	Asanosho	M8		(Japan)	Terao	7	-	8	-	0
7	-	8	-	0		(Japan)	Minatofuji	M9		(Japan)	**Kotonishiki**	8	-	7	-	0
7	-	8	-	0		(Japan)	Asanowaka	M10		(Japan)	**Hamanoshima**	9	-	6	-	0
8	-	7	-	0		(Japan)	**Tochinowaka**	M11		(Japan)	**Chiyotaikai**	8	-	7	-	0
7	-	8	-	0		(Japan)	Kotoryū	M12		(Japan)	**Higonoumi**	8	-	7	-	0
8	-	7	-	0		(Japan)	**Wakanojō**	M13		(Japan)	Kushimaumi	7	-	8	-	0
8	-	7	-	0		(Japan)	**Mainoumi**	M14		(Japan)	**Kitakachidoki**	8	-	7	-	0
8	-	7	-	0		(Japan)	**Akinoshū**	M15	ø							

ø - Indicates a pull-out or absent rank
**winning record in bold**
**Yusho Winner**
***Won Playoff**

=== Kyushu basho ===
Fukuoka International Centre, Kyushu, 9 November – 23 November

1997 Kyushu basho results - Makuuchi Division
W		L		A	East			Rank	West			W		L		A
14	-	1	-	0		(Japan)	**Takanohana**	Y	ø	(United States)	Akebono	0	-	0	-	15
12	-	3	-	0		(United States)	**Musashimaru**	O		(Japan)	**Takanonami***	14	-	1	-	0
10	-	5	-	0		(Japan)	**Wakanohana**	O	ø							
7	-	8	-	0		(Japan)	Tochiazuma	S	ø	(Japan)	Dejima	5	-	3	-	7
					ø			S		(Japan)	Takatōriki	6	-	9	-	0
6	-	9	-	0		(Japan)	Tochinonada	K		(Japan)	Akinoshima	7	-	8	-	0
4	-	11	-	0		(Japan)	Tamakasuga	M1		(Japan)	Tosanoumi	7	-	8	-	0
6	-	9	-	0		(Japan)	Asahiyutaka	M2		(Japan)	Hamanoshima	4	-	11	-	0
6	-	9	-	0		(Japan)	Oginishiki	M3		(Japan)	**Kaiō**	8	-	7	-	0
8	-	7	-	0		(Japan)	**Kotonishiki**	M4		(Japan)	Tochinowaka	3	-	12	-	0
6	-	9	-	0		(Japan)	Chiyotaikai	M5		(Japan)	Higonoumi	6	-	9	-	0
11	-	4	-	0		(Japan)	**Musōyama**	M6		(Japan)	Kotoinazuma	5	-	10	-	0
7	-	8	-	0		(Japan)	Ganyū	M7		(Japan)	Wakanojō	5	-	10	-	0
9	-	6	-	0		(Japan)	**Kotonowaka**	M8		(Mongolia)	**Kyokushūzan**	9	-	6	-	0
5	-	10	-	0		(Japan)	Mainoumi	M9		(Japan)	Terao	6	-	9	-	0
8	-	7	-	0		(Japan)	**Aogiyama**	M10		(Japan)	**Shikishima**	8	-	7	-	0
8	-	7	-	0		(Japan)	**Mitoizumi**	M11		(Japan)	**Kitakachidoki**	8	-	7	-	0
7	-	8	-	0		(United States)	Yamato	M12		(Japan)	Minatofuji	9	-	6	-	0
9	-	6	-	0		(Japan)	**Akinoshū**	M13		(Japan)	**Asanowaka**	8	-	7	-	0
5	-	9	-	0	ø	(United States)	Konishiki	M14		(Japan)	**Kotoryū**	9	-	6	-	0
0	-	0	-	15	ø	(Japan)	Asanosho	M15		(Japan)	Kushimaumi	3	-	12	-	0

ø - Indicates a pull-out or absent rank
**winning record in bold**
**Yusho Winner**
***Won Playoff**

== News ==
=== January ===
- At the Hatsu basho, ozeki Wakanohana wins his third makuuchi division championship with a 14–1 score. His brother, Yokozuna Takanohana returns from a back injury and is runner-up on 13–2. Yokozuna Akebono and ozeki Musashimaru take third place with 12–3. Mongolian Kyokushuzan wins the Technique Prize. The Outstanding Performance Prize goes to Tosanoumi and the Fighting Spirit Award to Kotoryu. Dejima wins the juryo yusho.

=== March ===
- In Osaka, Takanohana takes his 16th championship after an unusual four way playoff also involving Akebono, Musashimaru and maegashira 1 Kaio, after all finish on 12–3. He defeats Kaio and then Akebono, who had eliminated Musashimaru. Kaio, who had upset both Takanohana and Akebono earlier in the tournament, is awarded the Outstanding Performance prize. Dejima receives Technique and Fighting Spirit prizes for scoring eleven wins in his top division debut. Tamakasuga also receives a share of the Fighting Spirit prize. Wakanohana withdraws early after tearing a muscle in his right leg. Terao is also forced to withdraw after breaking his big toe, ending a run of 1359 consecutive bouts from his debut in 1979. Chiyotaikai wins the juryo championship. Former komusubi Naminohana retires.

=== May ===
- Akebono wins his 9th yusho, and first for over two years, by defeating Takanohana twice on the final day, once in regulation and once in a playoff after both yokozuna finish on 13–2. It is the first time that Takanohana and Akebono alone have fought a playoff, and comes after Akebono had lost seven times in a row to his rival. Wakanohana sits the tournament out. Kaio suffers a serious leg injury after standing at 7–4 on the 11th day and has to withdraw. Tamakasuga wins his second successive sansho, for Outstanding Performance. Tosanoumi and Tochiazuma share the Fighting Spirit Award. Oginishiki wins the Technique Prize. Tokitsuumi wins the juryo yusho in his debut in the division. Toki wins the makushita championship. Former sekiwake Kotogaume retires, as does juryo wrestler Sunahama (William Taylor Hopkins) from Hawaii.
- Former ozeki Daiju takes over the running of Asahiyama stable following the death of its stablemaster.

=== June ===
- To mark 100 years of trade relations between Japan and Australia a tour by top division wrestlers visits Melbourne on the 6th and 7th, where an exhibition tournament is held at Melbourne Park (home of the Australian Open), and Sydney on the 13th and 14th, at the Sydney Entertainment Centre.

=== July ===
- Takanohana defeats Akebono on the final day in Nagoya to claim his 17th championship with a 13–2 record. Akebono is runner-up on 12–3. Takatoriki is third on 11–4 and wins the Outstanding Performance Prize. Tochiazuma wins his first Technique Award, and Tochinonada receives the Fighting Spirit Prize. Wakanohana just preserves his ozeki status with an 8–7 record. Chiyotaikai wins his second juryo championship and promotion to makuuchi, the first top division wrestler produced by the former Chiyonofuji (Kokonoe-oyakata). Former juryo veteran Dairyu retires at the age of 37 after 21 years in sumo.

=== September ===
- At the Aki basho Takanohana wins back-to-back titles for the first time in a year, defeating Musashimaru in a playoff after both men finish on 13–2. Takanonami is third on 12–3. Dejima finishes on 11–4 and wins Technique and Outstanding Performance Prizes. Tochiazuma also receives a share of the Technique Prize in his debut tournament at sekiwake. The Fighting Spirit Award goes to Tochinonada for the second time in a row. In the juryo division Oginohana wins his fourth championship. Toyozakura wins the makushita yusho. Rikio retires after a disagreement with his stablemaster (the former Takanosato).

=== November ===
- In Kyushu, former ozeki Konishiki retires after winning only five bouts at maegashira 14, bringing to an end a career that encompassed three yusho and 81 consecutive top division tournaments. His final match proves to be his eighth defeat in his bout against Kotonowaka on Day 13, as he is not allowed onto the dohyo to face Misugisato on the following day due to his stablemaster having already handed in his retirement papers. Former sekiwake Wakashoyo, and maegashira Kotobeppu also retire. The championship is won by Takanonami, his second. He defeats his stablemate Takanohana in a playoff after both wrestlers finish on 14–1. All the sekiwake and komusubi record losing scores, the first time this has happened in seven years. Unsurprisingly only one special prize is awarded, to Musoyama for Fighting Spirit. Akebono sits the tournament out. Wakanosato wins the juryo title after a playoff with Susanoumi. Kitazakura wins the makushita yusho.

== Deaths ==
- 20 May: Asahiyama Oyakata (former komusubi Wakafutase), aged 55.
- 5 July: Former sekiwake Kainoyama (also briefly Onogawa Oyakata), aged 57.
- 18 August: Former sekiwake Tochiakagi, aged 42.
- 17 September: Tatsutayama Oyakata (former maegashira Amanoyama), aged 43.
- 24 September: Asakayama Oyakata (former komusubi Aobayama), aged 47.

== See also ==
- Glossary of sumo terms
- List of past sumo wrestlers
- List of years in sumo
- List of yokozuna
