= Wakanohana =

Wakanohana may refer to:

- Wakanohana Kanji I (1928–2010), sumo wrestler, the 45th Yokozuna
- Wakanohana Kanji II (1953–2022), sumo wrestler, the 56th Yokozuna
- Wakanohana Masaru (born 1971), sumo wrestler, the 66th Yokozuna
