= Kotoinazuma Yoshihiro =

Japanese sumo wrestler

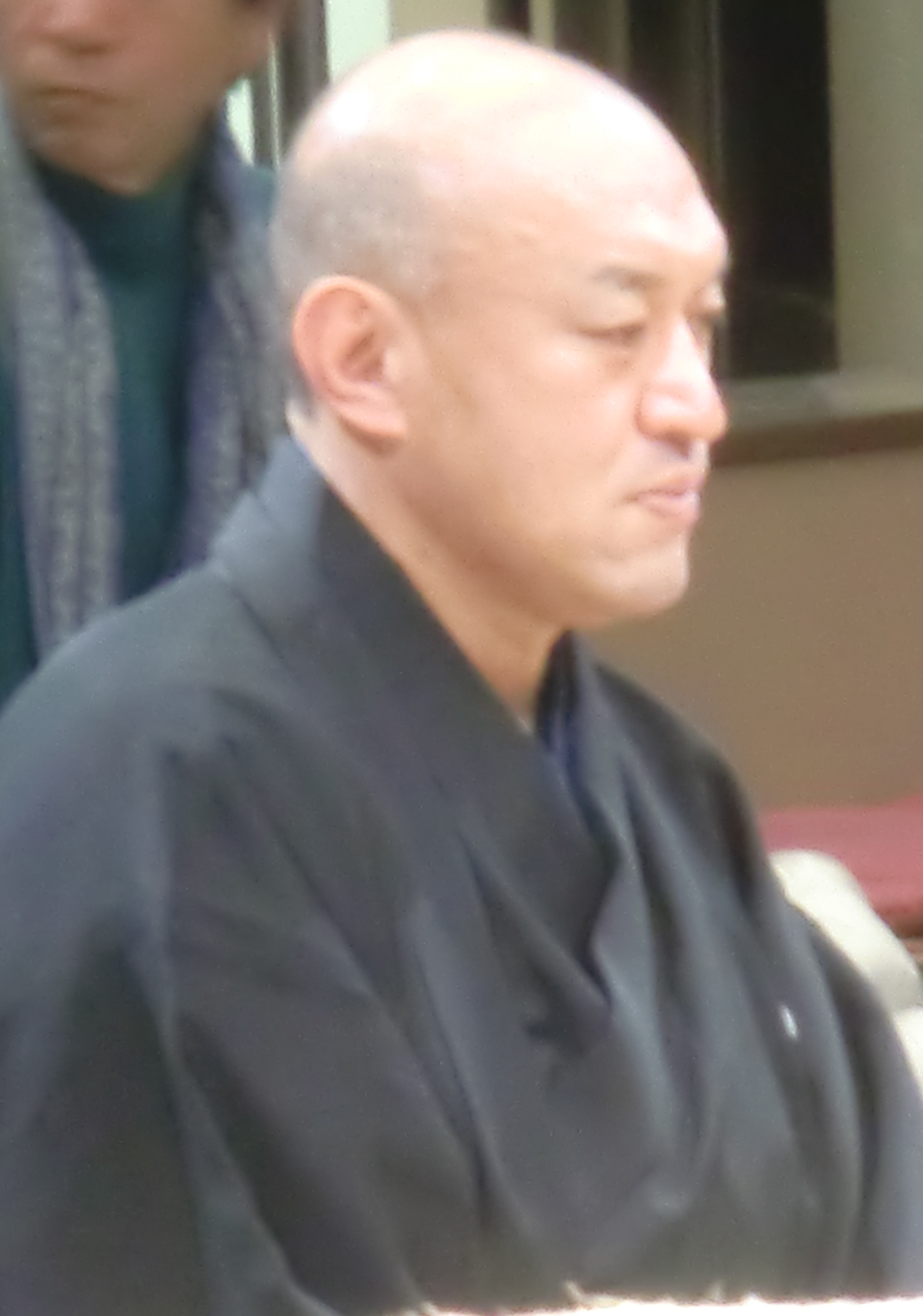

Personal information
- Native name: 琴稲妻 佳弘
- Born: Masahiro Tamura; 26 April 1962 (age 64) Niiharu, Gunma, Japan
- Height: 1.81 m (5 ft 11 1/2 in)
- Weight: 137 kg (302 lb)

Sport
- Sport: Sumo
- Retired: July 1999
- Heya: Sadogatake
- Record: 752–802–30
- Debut: March 1978
- Highest rank: Komusubi (November 1995)
- Elder name: Kumegawa
- Special Prizes: Outstanding Performance (1); Fighting Spirit (1)
- Updated on August 2012

Kotoinazuma Yoshihiro (born 26 April 1962 as Masahiro Tamura) is a former sumo wrestler from Niiharu, Gunma, Japan. He made his professional debut in 1978, and reached the top division in 1987. His highest rank was komusubi and he earned two special prizes. After retirement he became an elder in the Japan Sumo Association and as of 2016 he is a coach at Sadogatake stable under the name Kumegawa.

== Career ==
He was recruited by the former yokozuna Kotozakura of the Sadogatake stable. For his first appearance on the banzuke ranking sheets he was given the shikona of Kotoinazuma, with the prefix of Koto, the Japanese stringed instrument, used by all members of his stable, and the suffix "Inazuma" meaning "lightning."

Kotoinazuma was a late-blooming wrestler. It took him over nine years from his professional debut in March 1978 to reach the top makuuchi division, in November 1987. He was one of the few wrestlers to reach the top division despite twice going 0–7 in the lower divisions. (He also shares with yokozuna Kitanoumi the odd distinction of following an undefeated 7–0 score with a 0–7.) In addition it took Kotoinazuma 100 career tournaments before he earned a special prize (an Outstanding Performance Award in September 1994), which is the most in sumo history. He is also the second slowest to make it to a sanyaku rank, at 106 tournaments from sumo entry. This occurred when he was promoted to the rank of komusubi for the November 1995 tournament. This was to be his only tournament in sanyaku, as he had a losing record of six wins against nine losses. However, he did have his first and only win over a yokozuna in this tournament, defeating Takanohana. (He never upset a yokozuna at a maegashira rank and so did not receive any gold stars). He fought his final tournament in makuuchi in September 1998, by which time he was the oldest man in the top division. He competed in 60 top division tournaments without ever achieving double-digit wins, which is a record. He announced his retirement in July 1999 after facing certain demotion to the unsalaried makushita division. He had been an active wrestler for 21 years and fought 1551 bouts across 129 tournaments.

== Retirement from sumo ==
Kotoinazuma became an elder of the Japan Sumo Association under the name Kumegawa Oyakata. He works as a coach at Sadogatake stable, and as a judge of tournament bouts.

== Fighting style ==
Kotoinazuma was one of the lighter men in the top division at around 130 kg (290 lb), and he lacked the power and skill to compete with the strongest wrestlers in the top division. Although he was fairly adept at pushing and thrusting techniques, he favoured yotsu-sumo or grappling techniques. His preferred grip on his opponent's mawashi was migi-yotsu, a left hand outside, right hand inside position. He would regularly use his left hand outer grip to win by uwate-nage or overarm throw, although his most common winning kimarite was yori-kiri, a straightforward force out. He also had the slap down, scoop throw and outer leg trip in his repertoire.

== Personal life ==
Kotoinazuma's interests include music and golf.

He received treatment for gout and a side-effect of the therapeutic agent was hair loss. This meant that the tokoyama or hairdressers had difficulty in producing the elaborate ginkgo leaf style oichomage or topknot that professional sumo wrestlers are required to wear on the dohyō. He had a physical resemblance to another top division wrestler of the time, Sasshūnada, who also had a receding hair-line.

== Career record ==
Kotoinazuma Yoshihiro
Year	January Hatsu basho, Tokyo	March Haru basho, Osaka	May Natsu basho, Tokyo	July Nagoya basho, Nagoya	September Aki basho, Tokyo	November Kyūshū basho, Fukuoka
1978	x	(Maezumo)	West Jonokuchi #19; 5–2	West Jonidan #58; 5–2	East Jonidan #20; 1–6	East Jonidan #60; 4–3
1979	West Jonidan #43; 4–3	East Jonidan #21; 5–2	East Sandanme #84; 4–3	West Sandanme #67; 3–4	East Sandanme #80; 7–0–P	East Makushita #60; 0–7
1980	East Sandanme #30; 3–4	West Sandanme #43; 2–5	West Sandanme #71; 4–3	West Sandanme #58; 5–2	West Sandanme #26; 2–5	West Sandanme #49; 4–3
1981	West Sandanme #32; 5–2	East Sandanme #8; 5–2	West Makushita #47; 4–3	East Makushita #34; 4–3	East Makushita #25; 0–7	East Makushita #55; 6–1
1982	East Makushita #26; 5–2	West Makushita #14; 3–4	West Makushita #22; 2–5	East Makushita #49; 4–3	East Makushita #36; 4–3	West Makushita #27; 4–3
1983	West Makushita #19; 2–5	West Makushita #38; 5–2	West Makushita #21; 4–3	West Makushita #14; 2–5	East Makushita #29; 5–2	West Makushita #17; 2–5
1984	West Makushita #32; 3–4	East Makushita #42; 4–3	East Makushita #32; 4–3	East Makushita #22; 4–3	West Makushita #15; 3–4	West Makushita #23; 6–1
1985	East Makushita #8; 4–3	East Makushita #4; 5–2	West Jūryō #13; 8–7	East Jūryō #8; 8–7	West Jūryō #6; 5–10	East Jūryō #12; 9–6
1986	West Jūryō #7; 6–9	West Jūryō #11; 7–8	East Jūryō #13; 9–6	East Jūryō #8; 6–9	East Jūryō #11; 9–6	East Jūryō #7; 8–7
1987	East Jūryō #4; 8–7	West Jūryō #1; 8–7	East Jūryō #1; 5–10	West Jūryō #6; 9–6	West Jūryō #2; 10–5	East Maegashira #12; 8–7
1988	West Maegashira #11; 6–9	West Jūryō #2; 8–7	West Jūryō #1; 9–6	East Maegashira #14; 8–7	East Maegashira #10; 8–7	West Maegashira #5; 5–10
1989	West Maegashira #9; 9–6	West Maegashira #3; 6–9	West Maegashira #6; 6–9	East Maegashira #10; 8–7	East Maegashira #8; 7–8	West Maegashira #9; 8–7
1990	West Maegashira #3; 5–10	East Maegashira #9; 8–7	East Maegashira #3; 4–11	East Maegashira #12; 8–7	East Maegashira #10; 8–7	East Maegashira #5; 6–9
1991	East Maegashira #9; 3–5–7	East Jūryō #3; Sat out due to injury 0–0–15	East Jūryō #3; 10–5	East Maegashira #15; 8–7	East Maegashira #12; 7–8	West Maegashira #14; 7–8
1992	West Maegashira #16; 8–7	West Maegashira #12; 3–4–8	West Jūryō #4; 6–9	East Jūryō #6; 11–4–P	West Maegashira #15; 8–7	West Maegashira #10; 7–8
1993	East Maegashira #12; 9–6	East Maegashira #8; 6–9	West Maegashira #12; 8–7	West Maegashira #8; 5–10	West Maegashira #14; 9–6	East Maegashira #9; 6–9
1994	West Maegashira #12; 8–7	East Maegashira #8; 6–9	East Maegashira #13; 8–7	East Maegashira #10; 8–7	East Maegashira #5; 8–7; O	East Maegashira #1; 5–10
1995	East Maegashira #5; 5–10	West Maegashira #9; 6–9	East Maegashira #14; 9–6	West Maegashira #9; 8–7	West Maegashira #1; 9–6; F	East Komusubi #1; 6–9
1996	West Maegashira #2; 2–13	East Maegashira #13; 9–6	West Maegashira #6; 7–8	East Maegashira #7; 8–7	West Maegashira #2; 4–11	West Maegashira #6; 5–10
1997	West Maegashira #12; 8–7	West Maegashira #7; 7–8	West Maegashira #8; 8–7	West Maegashira #2; 5–10	West Maegashira #5; 6–9	West Maegashira #6; 5–10
1998	West Maegashira #11; 8–7	East Maegashira #10; 6–9	West Maegashira #14; 8–7	West Maegashira #12; 7–8	East Maegashira #14; 4–11	West Jūryō #3; 6–9
1999	East Jūryō #7; 5–10	West Jūryō #12; 9–6	East Jūryō #8; 8–7	West Jūryō #5; Retired; 3–12	x	x
Record given as wins–losses–absences Top division champion Top division runner-up Retired Lower divisions Non-participation Sanshō key: F=Fighting spirit; O=Outstanding performance; T=Technique Also shown: ★=Kinboshi; P=Playoff(s); Divisions: Makuuchi — Jūryō — Makushita — Sandanme — Jonidan — Jonokuchi Makuuchi ranks: Yokozuna — Ōzeki — Sekiwake — Komusubi — Maegashira

== See also ==
- Glossary of sumo terms
- List of past sumo wrestlers
- List of sumo elders
- List of komusubi
