= Magaki =

Magaki may refer to:

- Magaki (King of Fighters), a character in the King of Fighters video game series
- Magaki stable (間垣部屋, Magaki beya) a defunct stable of sumo wrestlers
- Tosayutaka Yūya, sumo wrestler and holder of the Magaki elder name
