= Misugisato Kōji =

Japanese sumo wrestler

Personal information
- Native name: 三杉里 公似
- Born: Kōji Okamoto; 1 July 1962 (age 64) Shiga, Japan
- Height: 1.85 m (6 ft 1 in)
- Weight: 158 kg (348 lb)

Sport
- Sport: Sumo
- Retired: July, 1998
- Heya: Futagoyama
- Record: 700-710-2
- Debut: January 1979
- Highest rank: Komusubi (January 1989)
- Elder name: See retirement
- Championships: 1 (Jūryō)
- Special Prizes: Fighting Spirit (1)
- Gold Stars: 6 Akebono (3); Hokutoumi (2); Asahifuji
- Updated on June 2020

Misugisato Kōji (born 1 July 1962 as Kōji Okamoto) is a former sumo wrestler from Shiga Prefecture, Japan. He made his professional debut in 1979, and his highest rank was komusubi which he reached in 1989. He earned six gold stars for defeating yokozuna and one special prize for Fighting Spirit. He retired in 1998 and became an elder of the Japan Sumo Association before leaving the sumo world in 2006.

== Career ==
Born in Shigaraki, Koka District, he joined Futagoyama stable at the beginning of 1979 at the age of 15, recruited by former yokozuna Wakanohana. He initially fought under his own surname before being given the shikona of Misugisato (meaning "village of three cedars") in 1980. In July 1984 he reached the sekitori ranks for the first time, but lasted only one tournament in the juryo division before being demoted back to makushita. It took him exactly two years to win promotion back to juryo and he promptly won the divisional yusho or tournament championship with an 11-4 record. He moved up and down the division a few times before winning promotion to the top makuuchi division after a 10-5 score at the rank of Juryo 2 in March 1988. In November 1988 he scored nine wins against six losses at the rank of maegashira 7, which was enough to see him promoted to komusubi for the January 1989 tournament. Unusually, he had been promoted to the san'yaku ranks without ever having faced any san'yaku ranked wrestlers himself. (He received some banzuke good fortune as both komusubi and most of the maegashira ranked above him had finished with make-koshi or losing records in November).

Misugisato was thrown in at the deep end in his komusubi debut, facing all the three yokozuna in the first three days. Unsurprisingly, he was unable to defeat any of them and finished with a losing score of 3-12. Nevertheless, he upset yokozuna Hokutoumi in the May and September 1989 tournaments, to earn the first two of his eventual six kinboshi or gold stars. On the final day of the January 1992 tournament he faced Takahanada, who needed the win to clinch his first top division tournament championship. Takahanada was the nephew of Misugisato's stablemaster Futagoyama, who was officiating in his last tournament as the head of the Japan Sumo Association and was due to present the trophy to the winner of the yusho. Misugisato had already earned a majority of wins, and lost the match to finish on 8-7. He and Takanohana would later become stablemates when Futagoyama stable merged with Takahanada's Fujishima stable. In May 1992 he earned ten wins at Maegashira 1, defeating ozeki Konishiki and Kirishima along the way, and was rewarded with his first sanshō or special prize, for Fighting Spirit, and promotion back to komusubi. He held the rank for the next two tournaments.

Misugisato never reached the san'yaku ranks again, but he remained in the top division until March 1997. He then fought in the juryo division until his retirement in July 1998 at the age of 36. Although he had a losing record by Day 9 and demotion to the third makushita division was inevitable, he was aware that his stablemaster Fujishima Oyakata would not let him compete at such a low level and so he was determined to reach 700 career wins in his final tournament. He achieved this on Day 12, and then announced his retirement.

== Retirement from sumo ==
Misugisato had his danpatsu-shiki, or official retirement ceremony, in January 1999. He remained in the sumo world as a coach, initially under his old fighting name for a two year grace period (jun-toshiyori), and then from July 2000 under the toshiyori or elder name of Hamakaze, but left his role in November 2006, following a rule change by the Sumo Association that meant he was no longer eligible to open his own stable. His elder stock was subsequently taken by the former maegashira Gojōrō Katsuhiro. Considerably in debt due to the amount he had invested in attempting to open a stable, he had a chanko restaurant and then became a practitioner of seitai. He runs a business called Misugisato's Gottsu Hand in Nakano, Tokyo offering tui na treatment. He has also helped with training sessions at Shikoroyama stable.

== Personal life ==
Misugisato was married in 1990. His eldest son was a successful American football and stickball player at high school and played in an all-star game.

He comes from area famous for its pottery, known as Shigaraki ware, and became interested in ceramics as a result. In his days as an active wrestler he also built up a vast record collection.

== Fighting style ==
Misugisato was a solidly yotsu-sumo (grappling) wrestler who did not often push or thrust at his opponents. His favoured grip on the mawashi was migi-yotsu, a left hand outside, right hand inside position. His most common winning kimarite was a straightforward yori-kiri, or force out. He was also well known for uwatenage, or overarm throw, and the ring edge throw (utchari), sometimes dubbed "Misugisato's Magic".

== Career record ==
Misugisato Kōji
Year	January Hatsu basho, Tokyo	March Haru basho, Osaka	May Natsu basho, Tokyo	July Nagoya basho, Nagoya	September Aki basho, Tokyo	November Kyūshū basho, Fukuoka
1979	(Maezumo)	West Jonokuchi #15; 5–2	East Jonidan #67; 2–5	West Jonidan #91; 4–3	East Jonidan #71; 4–3	East Jonidan #54; 1–6
1980	West Jonidan #85; 5–2	West Jonidan #43; 5–2	West Jonidan #7; 3–4	East Jonidan #21; 6–1	East Sandanme #58; 3–4	West Sandanme #75; 4–3
1981	West Sandanme #58; 3–2–2	East Sandanme #75; 6–1	West Sandanme #25; 2–5	West Sandanme #45; 5–2	West Sandanme #16; 2–5	West Sandanme #37; 3–4
1982	East Sandanme #46; 5–2	West Sandanme #9; 3–4	West Sandanme #26; 5–2	East Makushita #59; 4–3	East Makushita #47; 4–3	West Makushita #37; 3–4
1983	East Makushita #47; 3–4	West Sandanme #5; 5–2	West Makushita #38; 3–4	East Makushita #48; 4–3	West Makushita #42; 5–2	East Makushita #28; 5–2
1984	West Makushita #13; 4–3	East Makushita #11; 6–1	West Makushita #3; 5–2	West Jūryō #11; 4–11	East Makushita #8; 4–3	West Makushita #4; 3–4
1985	West Makushita #10; 3–4	East Makushita #19; 6–1	East Makushita #4; 2–5	West Makushita #16; 5–2	East Makushita #6; 4–3	West Makushita #3; 2–5
1986	West Makushita #16; 5–2	East Makushita #9; 6–1	East Makushita #1; 4–3	West Jūryō #12; 11–4–P; Champion	West Jūryō #4; 8–7	East Jūryō #3; 8–7
1987	West Jūryō #2; 6–9	East Jūryō #8; 7–8	East Jūryō #9; 8–7	West Jūryō #8; 8–7	West Jūryō #7; 7–8	West Jūryō #8; 10–5
1988	East Jūryō #3; 9–6	East Jūryō #2; 10–5	West Maegashira #13; 9–6	West Maegashira #7; 6–9	West Maegashira #12; 9–6	East Maegashira #7; 9–6
1989	West Komusubi #1; 3–12	East Maegashira #6; 8–7	West Maegashira #2; 6–9 ★	East Maegashira #5; 8–7	East Maegashira #3; 6–9 ★	West Maegashira #5; 6–9
1990	East Maegashira #10; 8–7	East Maegashira #8; 6–9	West Maegashira #10; 8–7	West Maegashira #7; 9–6	West Maegashira #1; 4–11	West Maegashira #9; 10–5
1991	East Maegashira #1; 6–9	East Maegashira #5; 8–7	West Maegashira #2; 6–9	West Maegashira #5; 8–7	West Maegashira #2; 8–7 ★	West Maegashira #2; 6–9
1992	West Maegashira #5; 8–7	East Maegashira #3; 8–7	East Maegashira #1; 10–5; F	West Komusubi #1; 8–7	East Komusubi #1; 5–10	East Maegashira #3; 8–7
1993	West Maegashira #2; 7–8	West Maegashira #3; 9–6 ★	East Maegashira #1; 7–8	East Maegashira #2; 5–10	East Maegashira #6; 8–7	East Maegashira #2; 6–9
1994	East Maegashira #4; 8–7	East Maegashira #1; 6–9	East Maegashira #4; 6–9	West Maegashira #6; 8–7	East Maegashira #1; 6–9	West Maegashira #3; 5–10 ★
1995	East Maegashira #8; 8–7	West Maegashira #1; 5–10	East Maegashira #6; 8–7	West Maegashira #1; 5–10	West Maegashira #4; 6–9	East Maegashira #6; 9–6
1996	East Maegashira #3; 6–9	East Maegashira #4; 8–7	East Maegashira #1; 4–11 ★	East Maegashira #6; 4–11	East Maegashira #14; 6–9	East Jūryō #1; 10–5
1997	West Maegashira #15; 8–7	West Maegashira #14; 4–11	West Jūryō #4; 9–6	West Jūryō #2; 9–6	East Jūryō #1; 7–8	East Jūryō #3; 9–6
1998	West Jūryō #1; 7–8	East Jūryō #2; 6–9	East Jūryō #5; 4–11	West Jūryō #13; Retired; 3–10–0	x	x
Record given as wins–losses–absences Top division champion Top division runner-up Retired Lower divisions Non-participation Sanshō key: F=Fighting spirit; O=Outstanding performance; T=Technique Also shown: ★=Kinboshi; P=Playoff(s); Divisions: Makuuchi — Jūryō — Makushita — Sandanme — Jonidan — Jonokuchi Makuuchi ranks: Yokozuna — Ōzeki — Sekiwake — Komusubi — Maegashira

== See also ==
- Glossary of sumo terms
- List of past sumo wrestlers
- List of komusubi
