= Tochiakagi Takanori =

Japanese sumo wrestler (1954–1997)

Personal information
- Native name: 栃赤城 雅男
- Born: Masao Kanaya; October 31, 1954 Numata, Gunma, Japan
- Died: August 18, 1997 (aged 42)
- Height: 1.80 m (5 ft 11 in)
- Weight: 135 kg (298 lb)

Sport
- Sport: Sumo
- Retired: March, 1990
- Heya: Kasugano
- Record: 556-543-46
- Debut: January, 1973
- Highest rank: Sekiwake (May, 1979)
- Championships: 1 (Jūryō)
- Special Prizes: Outstanding Performance (4); Fighting Spirit (4)
- Gold Stars: 8 Kitanoumi (3); Wakanohana II (3); Mienoumi; Wajima
- Updated on Sep. 2012

Tochiakagi Takanori (born Masao Kanaya; October 31, 1954 – August 18, 1997) was a sumo wrestler from Numata, Gunma, Japan. He made his professional debut in January 1973, and reached the top division in May 1977. His highest rank was sekiwake, which he first reached in May 1979. Unusually he kept the rank for the following tournament even though he had a majority of losses (7–8), because there were few wrestlers below him with good enough records to replace him. This was the first such occurrence since the establishment of the six tournaments per year system in 1958. He beat three yokozuna, Wajima, Wakanohana and Mienoumi, in one tournament in November 1979, and was to win eight kinboshi in total during his top division career. He won four Outstanding Performance and four Fighting Spirit prizes. He was one of the few wrestlers to employ the rare foot sweep technique of susoharai. In 1980 he was tipped alongside Kotokaze and Asashio as a possible ozeki candidate, but never achieved his potential due to an apparent aversion to hard training, and a smoking habit. He missed the November 1980 tournament because of a leg injury and thereafter had chronic problems with both his ankles. In addition he had a poor diet and suffered from diabetes towards the end of his career. He fought in the unsalaried makushita division for 27 tournaments after being demoted from the jūryō division in 1985, longer than any other former sekiwake. He decided to retire when his stable master, former yokozuna Tochinishiki died in January 1990, although his name remained on the banzuke for the following tournament in the sandanme division, making him the first former sanyaku wrestler to fall this low since Ōyutaka in November 1985. He left the sumo world upon retirement. He died of a heart attack in 1997.

== Career record ==
Tochiakagi Takanori
Year	January Hatsu basho, Tokyo	March Haru basho, Osaka	May Natsu basho, Tokyo	July Nagoya basho, Nagoya	September Aki basho, Tokyo	November Kyūshū basho, Fukuoka
1973	(Maezumo)	West Jonokuchi #11; 6–1	West Jonidan #53; 6–1	West Jonidan #5; 5–2	West Sandanme #46; 4–3	West Sandanme #30; 3–4
1974	East Sandanme #42; 5–2	East Sandanme #21; 4–3	West Sandanme #10; 5–2	East Makushita #49; 4–3	West Makushita #39; 4–3	West Makushita #32; 4–3
1975	West Makushita #23; 4–3	West Makushita #20; 2–5	West Makushita #35; 5–2	East Makushita #19; 4–3	West Makushita #15; 3–4	West Makushita #22; 3–4
1976	West Makushita #30; 6–1	West Makushita #12; 4–3	East Makushita #8; 4–3	West Makushita #4; 5–2	West Makushita #1; 5–2	West Jūryō #10; 8–7
1977	East Jūryō #6; 8–7	West Jūryō #3; 9–6	West Maegashira #12; 10–5; F	East Maegashira #4; 5–10	West Maegashira #9; 8–7	West Maegashira #6; 9–6
1978	West Maegashira #2; 4–11	West Maegashira #8; 7–8	East Maegashira #11; 8–7	East Maegashira #8; 8–7	East Maegashira #5; 7–8	West Maegashira #6; 8–7
1979	West Maegashira #1; 6–9	East Maegashira #4; 10–5; F	East Sekiwake #1; 7–8	West Sekiwake #1; 9–6; O	East Sekiwake #1; 6–9	West Maegashira #1; 10–5; O★★★
1980	West Sekiwake #1; 11–4; O	East Sekiwake #1; 6–9	West Maegashira #2; Sat out due to injury 0–0–15	West Maegashira #2; 10–5; F★	West Sekiwake #1; 1–5–9	East Maegashira #8; Sat out due to injury 0–0–15
1981	East Maegashira #8; 9–6	East Maegashira #2; 10–5; O★	East Komusubi #1; 5–10	East Maegashira #4; 5–10	West Maegashira #7; 8–7 ★	West Maegashira #5; 9–6; F★
1982	East Maegashira #1; 2–13 ★	East Maegashira #7; 6–9	West Maegashira #10; 6–9	East Maegashira #15; 6–9	East Jūryō #3; 7–8	East Jūryō #5; 7–8
1983	West Jūryō #6; 8–7	East Jūryō #5; 9–6	East Jūryō #2; 9–6	East Maegashira #13; 6–9	East Jūryō #4; 8–7	East Jūryō #3; 10–5
1984	East Maegashira #13; 6–9	West Jūryō #1; 8–7	East Jūryō #1; 5–10	East Jūryō #7; 9–6	West Jūryō #3; 11–4; Champion	East Maegashira #12; 6–9
1985	East Jūryō #2; 5–10	West Jūryō #5; 6–9	East Jūryō #11; 6–9	West Makushita #2; 4–3	East Jūryō #13; 1–14	West Makushita #15; 2–5
1986	East Makushita #32; 3–4	East Makushita #43; 3–4	East Makushita #58; 4–3	West Makushita #42; 5–2	West Makushita #21; 3–4	East Makushita #30; 4–3
1987	East Makushita #23; 5–2	West Makushita #13; 5–2	West Makushita #6; 3–4	West Makushita #11; 4–3	East Makushita #6; 4–3	East Makushita #3; 3–4
1988	East Makushita #8; 3–4	East Makushita #12; 4–3	West Makushita #7; 4–3	East Makushita #3; 3–4	East Makushita #8; 3–4	East Makushita #13; 3–4
1989	West Makushita #18; 4–3	East Makushita #14; 4–3	West Makushita #10; 4–3	East Makushita #8; 4–3	East Makushita #3; 2–5	East Makushita #16; 1–6
1990	West Makushita #39; 2–5	East Sandanme #4; Retired; 0–0–7	x	x	x	x
Record given as wins–losses–absences Top division champion Top division runner-up Retired Lower divisions Non-participation Sanshō key: F=Fighting spirit; O=Outstanding performance; T=Technique Also shown: ★=Kinboshi; P=Playoff(s); Divisions: Makuuchi — Jūryō — Makushita — Sandanme — Jonidan — Jonokuchi Makuuchi ranks: Yokozuna — Ōzeki — Sekiwake — Komusubi — Maegashira

== See also ==
- Glossary of sumo terms
- List of past sumo wrestlers
- List of sekiwake
