= Amanoyama Shizuo =

Japanese sumo wrestler (1953–1997)

Personal information
- Native name: 天ノ山 静雄
- Born: Shizuo Ogata; December 28, 1953 Taku, Saga, Japan
- Died: September 17, 1997 (aged 43)
- Height: 1.90 m (6 ft 3 in)
- Weight: 177 kg (390 lb; 27.9 st)

Sport
- Sport: Sumo
- Retired: November, 1986
- Heya: Tokitsukaze
- Record: 400-408-7
- Debut: March, 1976
- Highest rank: Maegashira 1 (July, 1980)
- Elder name: Tatsutayama
- Championships: 3 (Makushita)
- Special Prizes: Fighting Spirit (1)
- Gold Stars: 2 (Mienoumi, Wakanohana II)
- Updated on June 25, 2020

Amanoyama Shizuo (born Shizuo Ogata; December 28, 1953 – September 17, 1997) was a sumo wrestler from Taku Saga, Japan. He was an amateur champion at Komazawa University and so was given makushita tsukedashi status upon entering professional sumo. He made his professional debut in March 1976, fighting under surname of Ogata, winning the third-division championship in September 1976, in an eight-way playoff, but following up with a losing record of six losses. In July 1977 he would win the third-division championship again, this time undefeated, and earning promotion to Jūryō. He then reached the top division in March 1978. In his top division debut he defeated ozeki Takanohana and scored 11 wins against 4 losses, winning the Fighting Spirit prize for the only time. He made his makuuchi debut in the same tournament as Kotowaka and as both were unusually tall, they were nicknamed "Jumbo Jet" and "Concorde". His highest rank was maegashira 1. Upon retirement from active competition, he became an elder in the Japan Sumo Association under the name Tatsutayama. He died while an active oyakata in September 1997 at the age of 43. He had been suffering from diabetes and liver disease since his days as an active wrestler.

== Career record ==
Amanoyama Shizuo
Year	January Hatsu basho, Tokyo	March Haru basho, Osaka	May Natsu basho, Tokyo	July Nagoya basho, Nagoya	September Aki basho, Tokyo	November Kyūshū basho, Fukuoka
1976	x	Makushita tsukedashi #60; 6–1	West Makushita #30; 4–3	East Makushita #24; 4–3	East Makushita #19; 6–1–PPP; Champion	West Makushita #5; 1–6
1977	West Makushita #31; 5–2	West Makushita #16; 5–2	West Makushita #9; 5–2	West Makushita #3; 7–0; Champion	East Jūryō #10; 8–7	West Jūryō #6; 9–6
1978	East Jūryō #2; 9–6	West Maegashira #11; 11–4; F	West Maegashira #2; 3–12	East Maegashira #12; 6–9	West Jūryō #3; 8–7	East Jūryō; 9–6
1979	East Jūryō #1; 9–6	West Maegashira #12; 8–7	East Maegashira #8; 8–7	West Maegashira #4; 7–8	East Maegashira #7; 9–6	East Maegashira #2; 6–9
1980	East Maegashira #5; 6–9	West Maegashira #9; 8–7	West Maegashira #6; 8–7	West Maegashira #1; 5–10 ★	West Maegashira #8; 7–8	East Maegashira #9; 8–7
1981	West Maegashira #5; 7–8	West Maegashira #5; 8–7 ★	West Maegashira #2; 6–9	West Maegashira #5; 4–11	East Maegashira #11; 6–9	East Jūryō #1; 10–5
1982	East Maegashira #12; 9–6	East Maegashira #4; 8–7	West Maegashira #1; 5–10	West Maegashira #8; 4–11	East Maegashira #12; 6–9	East Jūryō #3; 10–5
1983	East Maegashira #12; 6–9	East Jūryō #1; 6–9	West Jūryō #3; 10–5	East Maegashira #12; 7–8	West Jūryō #1; 11–4	West Maegashira #9; 5–10
1984	East Jūryō #1; 8–7	West Maegashira #13; 8–7	East Maegashira #8; 7–8	East Maegashira #10; 2–13	West Jūryō #6; 4–11	East Makushita #1; 4–3
1985	East Jūryō #13; 5–10	West Makushita #5; 2–5	West Makushita #24; 3–4	East Makushita #36; 7–0; Champion	West Makushita #5; 6–1	East Makushita #1; 4–3
1986	East Jūryō #11; 5–10	West Makushita #3; 3–4	West Makushita #7; 4–3	West Makushita #4; 3–4	West Makushita #9; 2–5	West Makushita #22; Retired; 0–0–7
Record given as wins–losses–absences Top division champion Top division runner-up Retired Lower divisions Non-participation Sanshō key: F=Fighting spirit; O=Outstanding performance; T=Technique Also shown: ★=Kinboshi; P=Playoff(s); Divisions: Makuuchi — Jūryō — Makushita — Sandanme — Jonidan — Jonokuchi Makuuchi ranks: Yokozuna — Ōzeki — Sekiwake — Komusubi — Maegashira

== See also ==
- Glossary of sumo terms
- List of past sumo wrestlers
