= Yamato Gō =

American sumo wrestler

Yamato Go
Personal information
- Native name: 大和 剛
- Born: George Kalima; 17 December 1969 (age 56) Hawaii, USA
- Height: 1.89 m (6 ft 2 1/2 in)
- Weight: 191 kg (421 lb)

Sport
- Sport: Sumo
- Retired: September 1998
- Heya: Magaki
- Record: 251–198–24
- Debut: November 1990
- Highest rank: Maegashira 12 (March 1997)
- Championships: 1 (Jonokuchi)
- Updated on July 2007

Yamato Gō (born 17 December 1969 as George Kalima) is a former sumo wrestler from Oahu, Hawaii, United States. His highest rank was maegashira 12.

== Career ==
Yamato was a schoolfriend of future yokozuna Akebono. He made his professional debut in November 1990, joining Magaki stable. Yamato reached the salaried sekitori ranks in March 1995 when he was promoted to the jūryō division. He reached the top makuuchi division in January 1997, the first wrestler from his stable to do so since it was re-established in 1983. He chalked up a winning record of 8–7 in his debut and was ranked there for seven tournaments. He was forced to sit out the March 1998 tournament with a life-threatening bout of pneumonia which sent him down to jūryō. Still not fully recovered in May, he turned in a disastrous 1–14 record and fell to the unsalaried makushita division. Just before the July tournament he was hit by a car and was forced to withdraw once again. This sent him down to the bottom of makushita. After a 5–2 score in September he decided to retire rather than face another long struggle back up the rankings, and started up his own restaurant, Kama'āina's, in Tokyo's Roppongi district.

Although Yamato never rose high enough in the rankings to face a yokozuna in tournament competition, he once defeated Takanohana eight times in a row in training.

== Fighting style ==
Yamato specialised in pushing and thrusting techniques, rarely fighting on the mawashi, and his two favourite kimarite were tsukidashi, or thrust out, and oshidashi, or push out.

== Family ==
Yamato's brother Glenn, one year younger than George, also joined Magaki stable two months after Yamato, competing under the shikona of Ōnami 男波 (later Wakachikara 若力). He was the same height as Yamato but considerably lighter at around 110 to 126 kg. In May 1993 he was ranked higher than his elder brother at Makushita 26, but was injured in the September 1993 tournament and dropped significantly in rank. He retired in November 1994, a few months before Yamatō's jūryō debut.

A third Kalima brother, Kalani, was also interested in joining sumo but was unable to find a stable and instead became a practitioner of Hawaiian martial arts.

== Career record ==
Yamato Go
Year	January Hatsu basho, Tokyo	March Haru basho, Osaka	May Natsu basho, Tokyo	July Nagoya basho, Nagoya	September Aki basho, Tokyo	November Kyūshū basho, Fukuoka
1990	x	x	x	x	x	(Maezumo)
1991	West Jonokuchi #34; 6–1–PP; Champion	West Jonidan #74; 2–3–2	East Jonidan #106; 4–3	West Jonidan #70; 3–4	East Jonidan #94; 6–1	West Jonidan #22; 6–1
1992	East Sandanme #64; 3–4	West Sandanme #78; 5–2	East Sandanme #45; 6–1	West Makushita #59; 3–4	West Sandanme #13; 3–4	West Sandanme #31; 3–4
1993	West Sandanme #46; 5–2	West Sandanme #14; 5–2	East Makushita #48; 2–5	West Sandanme #6; 3–4	East Sandanme #22; 5–2	East Makushita #58; 4–3
1994	West Makushita #50; 5–2	West Makushita #31; 5–2	West Makushita #18; 5–2	East Makushita #10; 3–4	East Makushita #16; 5–2	West Makushita #7; 4–3
1995	West Makushita #4; 6–1	East Jūryō #13; 6–9	West Makushita #3; 6–1	West Jūryō #11; 6–9	West Makushita #4; 5–2	West Jūryō #13; 9–6
1996	West Jūryō #8; 6–9	West Jūryō #12; 9–6	East Jūryō #7; 7–8	East Jūryō #11; 10–5	East Jūryō #4; 10–5	West Jūryō #1; 11–4
1997	West Maegashira #14; 8–7	West Maegashira #12; 7–8	West Maegashira #14; 7–8	West Maegashira #15; 6–9	West Jūryō #2; 11–4	East Maegashira #12; 7–8
1998	East Maegashira #14; 7–8	East Maegashira #16; Sat out due to injury 0–0–15	East Jūryō #9; 1–14	East Makushita #9; Sat out due to injury 0–0–7	East Makushita #49; Retired; 5–2	x
Record given as wins–losses–absences Top division champion Top division runner-up Retired Lower divisions Non-participation Sanshō key: F=Fighting spirit; O=Outstanding performance; T=Technique Also shown: ★=Kinboshi; P=Playoff(s); Divisions: Makuuchi — Jūryō — Makushita — Sandanme — Jonidan — Jonokuchi Makuuchi ranks: Yokozuna — Ōzeki — Sekiwake — Komusubi — Maegashira

== See also ==
- Glossary of sumo terms
- List of non-Japanese sumo wrestlers
- List of past sumo wrestlers
