= Wakanojō Munehiko =

Japanese sumo wrestler

Personal information
- Native name: 若ノ城 宗彦
- Born: Munehiko Aka; 13 April 1973 (age 53) Naha, Okinawa, Japan
- Height: 1.92 m (6 ft 3 1/2 in)
- Weight: 150 kg (330 lb)

Sport
- Sport: Sumo
- Retired: May, 2004
- Heya: Magaki
- Record: 356-375-27
- Debut: January, 1992
- Highest rank: Maegashira 6 (March, 1998)
- Elder name: See retirement
- Championships: 1 (Jūryō); 3 (Sandanme); 1 (Jonokuchi)
- Updated on June 2020

Wakanojō Munehiko (born 13 April 1973 as Munehiko Aka) is a former sumo wrestler from Naha, Okinawa, Japan. He made his professional debut in January 1992, and reached the top division in September 1997. His highest rank was maegashira 6. He retired in May 2004 due to diabetes, which he had been dealing with since the age of 18 and had seen him fall from the top division all the way down to the second lowest jonidan division. After retirement he became an office worker. He needed a kidney transplant in 2006 and his mother was the donor, which was featured in Tokyo Broadcasting System Television's The Friday in January 2018. He appeared in another edition of the program in June 2018, working alongside fellow ex-sumo wrestlers Wakatoba and Wakatenro, in care for the elderly (including making chankonabe).

== Career ==
He belonged to the judo club at Okinawa Shogaku High School and was a regular from his first year. In his second year, he won the National High School Judo Championship team competition and was said to be a potential Olympic judo representative. However, he decided to switch to sumo, and made his professional debut in January 1992, joining Magaki stable. He had been suffering from diabetes since before he entered the sumo world, having measured 190 cm and weighed 150 kg since he began judo in high school, and he had been eating a bowl of white rice every day. Because of that he struggled when at the top of the makushita division, but eventually broke through and was promoted to the jūryō division in September 1995. He won the jūryō yūshō with 12 wins and three losses in his first tournament in the division. Restricted by his condition he had mixed results for the next two years, but he won promotion to the top makuuchi division in September 1997 alongside Chiyotaikai. He was congratulated by his fellow sumo wrestlers of Okinawa Prefecture, and he was expected to eventually reach sanyaku. However, after promotion to makuuchi, his social activities increased, and the drinking and eating out exacerbated his diabetes. After reaching a high of maegashira 6 in March 1998 he had dropped back to juryo by July 1999. He continued to struggle in the juryo division, and was demoted further to makushita in May 2000. The following July tournament he returned to juryo, but fell to makushita again after two tournaments. In January 2001, his right knee joint was injured and he was forced to sit out two straight tournaments. After falling to sandanme he won the tournament championship there in September 2001, which temporarily returned him to the top of makushita, but then had six consecutive 3–4 records, and after one 7-0 score in sandanme, another six consecutive losing scores from January 2003. He fell to the second lowest jonidan division as a result. In his sixth bout in this January 2004 tournament, he had a win by tsukaminage, or lifting throw, only the second time this kimarite had been seen in the Heisei era. By May 2004 he had fallen to Jonidan West 79, the lowest rank recorded by a former makuuchi wrestler since the beginning of the Showa era (subsequently Towanoyama set a new low of Jonidan 90 West in 2005). After winning his first match in that tournament, he announced his retirement. His final career record was 356 wins against 375 losses, with 21 injury absences. His top division record over 12 tournaments was 78–102. His danpatsu-shiki or official retirement ceremony was held in a Tokyo on October 2, 2004 with around 100 guests participating.

== Retirement from sumo ==
After retiring, he remained in the Japan Sumo Association as an elder, first under his old shikona for two years (the jun-toshiyori system) and then as Nishiiwa (borrowed from Wakanosato), and worked as a coach at his stable. After leaving in May 2007 due to the retiring Takanotsuru needing the Nishiiwa stock, he served as a director of the Professional Baseball Masters League upon the recommendation of former Hiroshima Toyo Carp pitcher Sohachi Aniya (安仁屋宗八), who was also a senior at Okinawa High School. However, he was unaccustomed to desk work and the lack of exercise worsened the symptoms of his diabetes. He received a kidney transplant in 2006 from his mother, who was 64 years old at that time, and after that, he was able to resume the practice of judo, which he had not done since high school. In April 2017, it was reported that he was working at a nursing home while receiving three insulin injections a day. While working there he was featured on the Tokyo Broadcasting System Television's The Friday program alongside ex-stablemates Wakatoba and Wakatenro. Since March 2018, he has been a commentator on the "Dai Sumo LIVE" broadcast by AbemaTV.

== Fighting style ==
Wakanjo was a yotsu sumo wrestler, specializing in grappling moves rather than pushing or thrusting. He preferred a migi-yotsu (left hand outside, right hand inside) grip on his opponent's mawashi. His favourite techniques were yori-kiri (force out), and uwatenage (overarm throw).

== Career record ==
Wakanojō Munehiko
Year	January Hatsu basho, Tokyo	March Haru basho, Osaka	May Natsu basho, Tokyo	July Nagoya basho, Nagoya	September Aki basho, Tokyo	November Kyūshū basho, Fukuoka
1992	(Maezumo)	East Jonokuchi #33; 7–0; Champion	East Jonidan #45; 6–1	East Sandanme #83; 5–2	West Sandanme #48; 3–4	East Sandanme #67; 5–2
1993	West Sandanme #34; 4–3	West Sandanme #21; 7–0; Champion	East Makushita #15; 0–2–5	West Makushita #50; 4–3	West Makushita #41; 1–6	East Sandanme #13; 6–1
1994	East Makushita #41; 4–3	West Makushita #28; 5–2	West Makushita #16; 6–1	East Makushita #5; 2–5	East Makushita #19; 3–4	West Makushita #26; 5–2
1995	East Makushita #15; 5–2	West Makushita #7; 3–4	West Makushita #13; 6–1	West Makushita #2; 5–2	West Jūryō #13; 12–3; Champion	East Jūryō #4; 8–7
1996	West Jūryō #2; 3–12	East Jūryō #12; 8–7	East Jūryō #8; 8–7	West Jūryō #4; 6–9	East Jūryō #8; 7–8	West Jūryō #11; 8–7
1997	East Jūryō #6; 8–7	West Jūryō #4; 8–7	West Jūryō #3; 8–7	East Jūryō #3; 10–5	East Maegashira #13; 8–7	West Maegashira #7; 5–10
1998	East Maegashira #13; 9–6	West Maegashira #6; 5–10	West Maegashira #9; 8–7	West Maegashira #7; 4–11	East Maegashira #13; 8–7	East Maegashira #8; 6–9
1999	East Maegashira #11; 6–9	East Maegashira #14; 8–7	West Maegashira #12; 8–7	East Maegashira #11; 3–12	East Jūryō #3; 6–9	West Jūryō #5; 8–7
2000	East Jūryō #3; 3–12	West Jūryō #11; 5–10	East Makushita #2; 4–3	West Jūryō #12; 7–8	East Jūryō #13; 6–9	East Makushita #3; 2–5
2001	East Makushita #13; 3–3–1	East Makushita #20; Sat out due to injury 0–0–7	East Makushita #20; Sat out due to injury 0–0–7	East Makushita #59; 2–5	East Sandanme #18; 7–0; Champion	East Makushita #14; 3–4
2002	West Makushita #20; 3–4	West Makushita #27; 3–4	East Makushita #35; 3–4	East Makushita #43; 3–4	East Makushita #58; 3–4	East Sandanme #10; 7–0–P; Champion
2003	East Makushita #12; 2–5	East Makushita #29; 1–6	East Makushita #56; 2–5	West Sandanme #18; 3–4	West Sandanme #34; 1–6	East Sandanme #72; 1–6
2004	East Jonidan #3; 3–4	East Jonidan #19; 0–6–1	West Jonidan #79; Retired; 1–0	x	x	x
Record given as wins–losses–absences Top division champion Top division runner-up Retired Lower divisions Non-participation Sanshō key: F=Fighting spirit; O=Outstanding performance; T=Technique Also shown: ★=Kinboshi; P=Playoff(s); Divisions: Makuuchi — Jūryō — Makushita — Sandanme — Jonidan — Jonokuchi Makuuchi ranks: Yokozuna — Ōzeki — Sekiwake — Komusubi — Maegashira

== See also ==
- List of sumo tournament second division champions
- Glossary of sumo terms
- List of past sumo wrestlers
