= Magaki stable =

Defunct sumo stable

Magaki stable (間垣部屋, Magaki beya) (1983–2013) was a sumo stable of the Nishonoseki group.

Wakanohana Kanji II, the 56th yokozuna in sumo history, re-established the stable in 1983. Its first wrestler to reach the top makuuchi division was the Hawaiian born Yamato in 1997, followed by Gojōrō and Wakanojō, also in 1997. However the stable had less success in later years, with its decline dating from the death of Magaki Oyakata's wife and okamisan in 2005. Russian maegashira Wakanohō was thrown out of sumo in 2008 after being accused of cannabis possession, charges which were eventually dropped. In 2011, its highest ranked wrestler Wakatenrō was forced to retire because of accusations of match-fixing.

In January 2010 the stable, along with the Takanohana, Ōnomatsu and Ōtake stable, was forced to leave the Nishonoseki ichimon after Takanohana declared his intention to run as an unofficial candidate in the elections to the Sumo Association's board of directors.

The stable closed after the March 2013 tournament, due to the poor health of Magaki-oyakata. The stable had just three wrestlers remaining at this point, all in the lowest three divisions, although this did include future yokozuna Terunofuji (then known as Wakamishō). Despite its small size Magaki did not believe in letting its wrestlers go and train at other stables (degeiko), which led to Terunofuji often training alone. The coach and remaining wrestlers transferred to Isegahama stable. The original plan had been to merge with Miyagino stable, but negotiations fell through.

== Owner ==
- 1983–2013: 18th Magaki (The 56th yokozuna Wakanohana Kanji II)

== Notable members ==
- Gojōrō (maegashira)
- Wakanohō (maegashira)
- Wakanojō (maegashira)
- Yamato (maegashira)
- Wakamishō (later yokozuna Terunofuji)

== See also ==
- List of sumo stables
- List of sumo elders
- List of active sumo wrestlers
- List of past sumo wrestlers
- List of years in sumo
- Glossary of sumo terms
