= Takanohana Kōji =

Japanese sumo wrestler

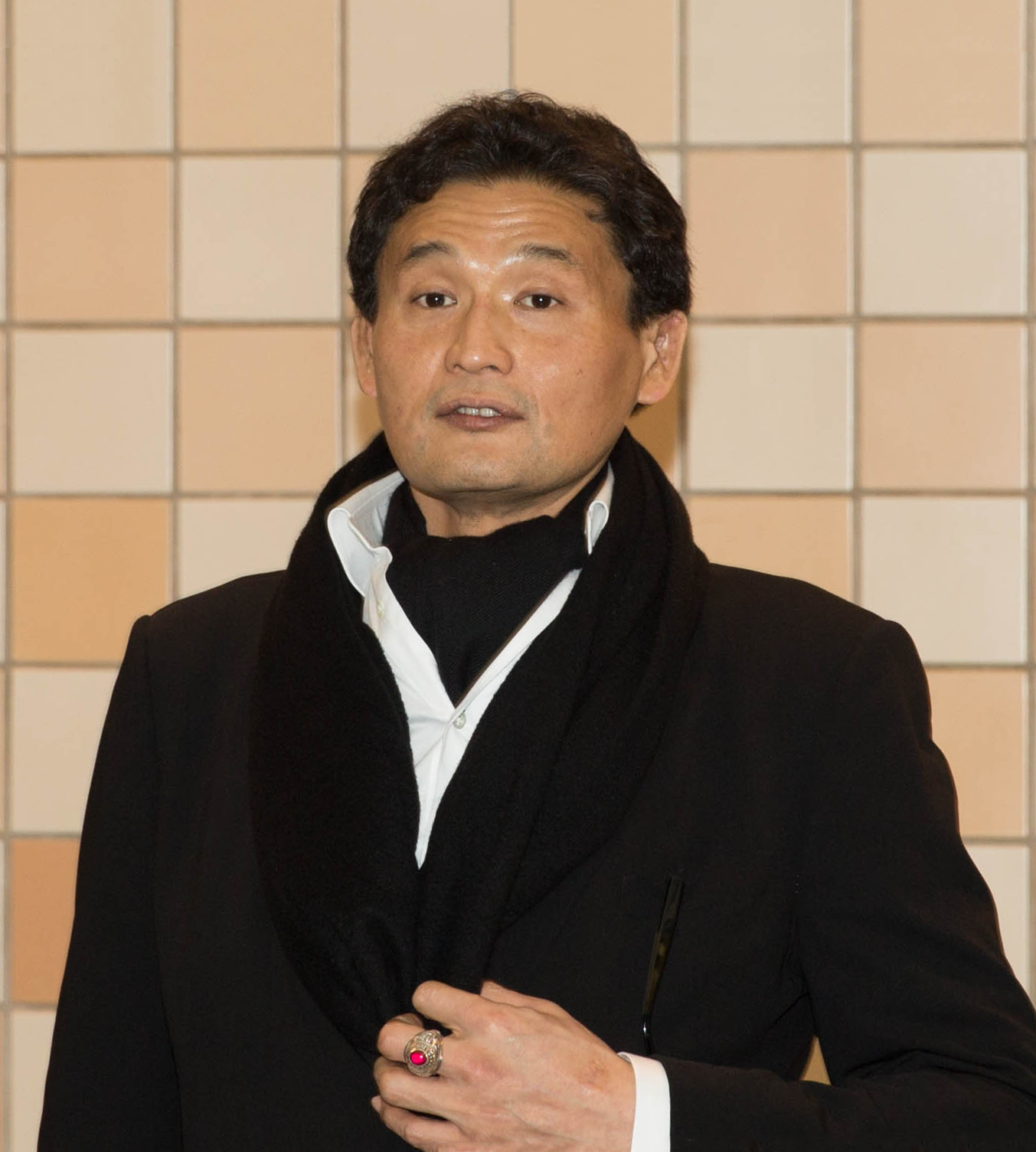
- Takanohana, January 2015

Personal information
- Native name: 貴乃花 光司
- Born: Kōji Hanada; August 12, 1972 (age 54) Suginami, Tokyo, Japan
- Height: 185 cm (73 in)
- Weight: 154 kg (340 lb)

Sport
- Sport: Sumo
- Retired: January, 2003
- Heya: Fujishima → Futagoyama
- Record: 794-262-201
- Debut: March, 1988
- Highest rank: Yokozuna (November 1994)
- Elder name: Takanohana
- Championships: 22 (Makuuchi); 2 (Makushita)
- Special Prizes: Outstanding Performance (4); Fighting Spirit (2); Technique (3)
- Gold Stars: 1 (Chiyonofuji)
- Updated on June 2020

Takanohana Kōji (Japanese: 貴乃花 光司, Hepburn: Takanohana Kōji; born August 12, 1972, as Kōji Hanada (花田 光司, Hanada Kōji)) is a Japanese former professional sumo wrestler and coach. He was the 65th man in history to reach sumo's highest rank of yokozuna, and he won 22 tournament championships between 1992 and 2001, the sixth highest total ever. The son of a popular ōzeki ranked wrestler from the 1970s, Takanohana's rise through the ranks alongside his elder brother Wakanohana and his rivalry with the foreign born yokozuna Akebono saw interest in sumo and attendance at tournaments soar during the early 1990s.

Takanohana was the youngest ever to reach the top division at just 17, and he set a number of other age-related records. He had a solid but aggressive style, looking to get a right hand grip on his opponents' mawashi and move them quickly out of the ring. He won over half his bouts by a straightforward yorikiri, or force out. In his later career he suffered increasingly from injuries, and he retired in January 2003 at the age of 30. He became the head coach of Takanohana stable in 2004 and was on the board of directors of the Japan Sumo Association from 2010 until January 2018, when he was removed and demoted in the Sumo Association's hierarchy. He resigned from the Sumo Association in September 2018.

== Background ==
Takanohana comes from a family with a great sumo history, sometimes called the "Hanada Dynasty." His uncle Wakanohana Kanji I was a yokozuna from 1958 to 1962, and his father Takanohana Kenshi had held the second highest rank of ōzeki for a then record 50 tournaments from 1972 to 1981. Upon his retirement his father established the training stable (heya) Fujishima stable. The young Kōji Hanada had been practicing sumo since elementary school and won the equivalent of a yokozuna title in junior high school. Upon his graduation in 1988 he formally joined his father's stable. His elder brother Masaru had been planning to complete high school but dropped out so as not to lag behind his brother.

== Early career ==
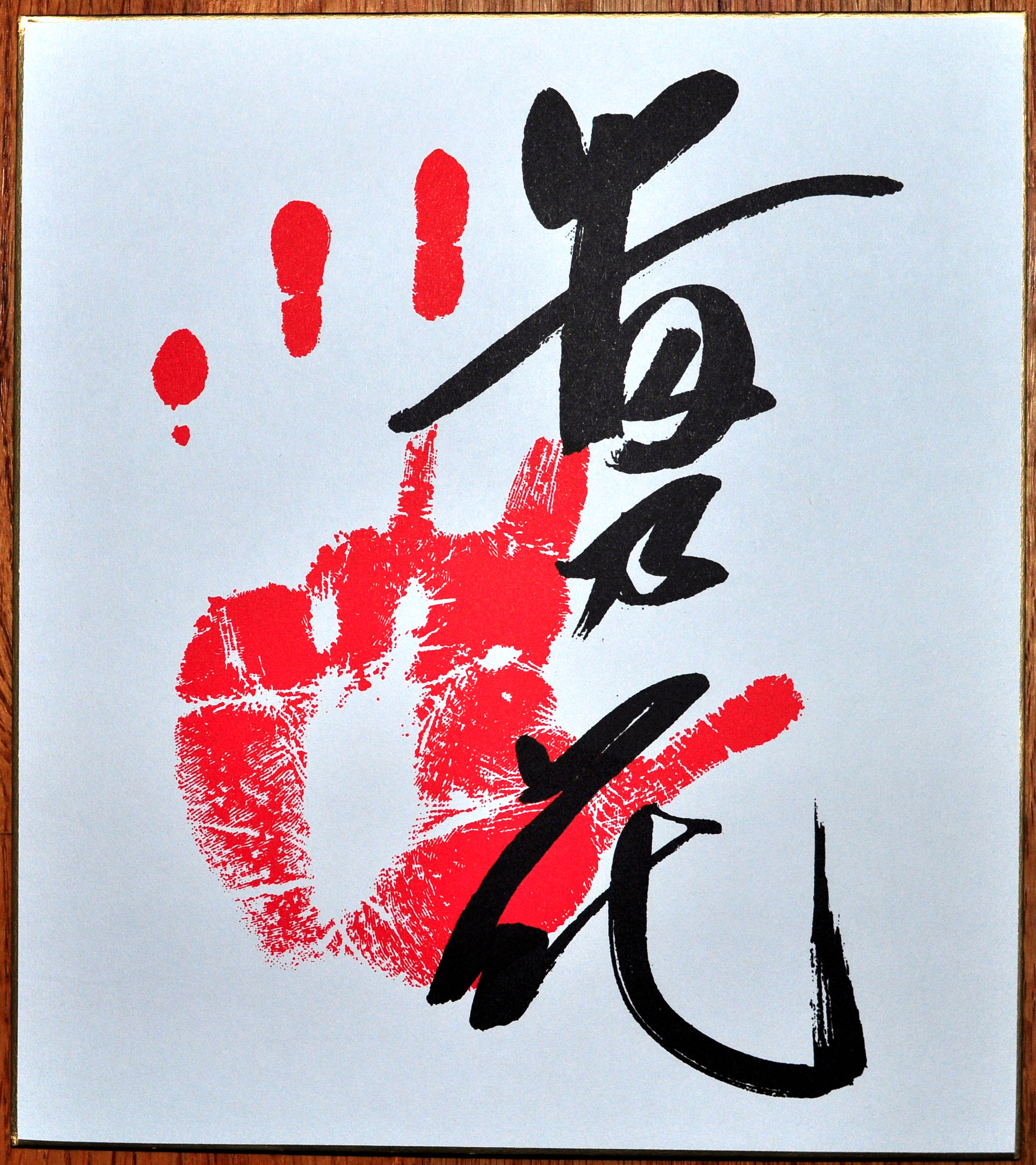
Tegata (hand print autograph) of Takanohana

Takanohana and his brother made their professional debuts together in March 1988, with future rival Akebono also beginning his career in the same month. The two brothers had to move from the family quarters in the stable and join the communal room with all the other new recruits. They were also instructed not to refer to their parents as "father" and "mother" any more but as "oyakata" and "okamisan" (coach and coach's wife). Kōji initially wrestled under the name Takahanada (貴花田), and it was understood that he would only be allowed to adopt his father's shikona of Takanohana (meaning noble flower) when he reached the rank of ōzeki.

Their early career attracted much publicity, with each divisional promotion regarded by the media as part of an inevitable rise to the top ranks. Takahanada's progress was rapid and he set numerous age-related records, including the youngest ever makushita division tournament champion (16 years 9 months), youngest ever promoted to the second highest jūryō division (17 years 3 months), and the youngest ever promoted to the top makuuchi division (17 years 8 months).

In March 1991, in his fourth top division tournament, Takahanada was runner-up with twelve wins, and became the youngest ever sanshō or special prize winner, receiving awards for Fighting Spirit and Technique. In the following tournament in May 1991 he defeated veteran yokozuna Chiyonofuji in a match watched by 44 percent of the Japanese population on TV, becoming the youngest ever to defeat a yokozuna. Chiyonofuji retired two days afterwards. In January 1992, he became the youngest ever top division tournament champion (19 years 5 months). He was too young to drink the celebratory sake at the after tournament party, and had to make do with oolong tea instead. After his second championship in September 1992, followed by two good scores of 10–5 and 11–4 in the next two tournaments, he was promoted to ōzeki in January 1993, the same tournament in which Akebono was elevated to yokozuna.

During this period the two brothers created a so-called "Waka-Taka boom" and were credited with restoring sumo's popularity, particularly amongst younger audiences. Interest in sumo rose to its highest level since the era of Futabayama in the 1930s, with official tournaments (honbasho) selling out of tickets every day. Both Takahanada and his brother became sex symbols.

== Promotion to yokozuna ==
Now known as Takanohana (貴ノ花), he was also the youngest ever to be promoted to ōzeki at 20 years 5 months. With the foreign born Akebono as sumo's only yokozuna, there was a great weight of expectation on Takanohana to make the next step up. However, his lack of consistency, and Akebono's dominance, delayed his promotion to yokozuna. He won his third championship in May 1993, but lost a playoff to Akebono in the following tournament in July, and even produced a make-koshi or losing record of 7–8 in November. In 1994, a year in which Akebono suffered several injury problems, Takanohana won the January and May tournaments, but was then outshone by Musashimaru, who won in July with a perfect 15–0 record. After taking the September 1994 championship, Takanohana now had six top division titles, but none had been won consecutively. No previous wrestler had ever accumulated so many titles before reaching sumo's highest rank. The Sumo Association nominated him for yokozuna after the September tournament, but the Yokozuna Deliberation Council failed to endorse it by the required two-thirds majority, the first time this had happened in twenty five years. They insisted that two consecutive championships were required, having demanded the same of Akebono before his promotion. After changing the spelling of his shikona in November 1994, Takanohana at last managed to win two consecutive tournaments, with his second consecutive unbeaten 15–0 score, and his promotion was confirmed. He had been at the ōzeki rank for 11 tournaments, or nearly two years. However, at 22 years and 3 months, he was still the third youngest yokozuna ever at the time.

== Yokozuna career ==
=== 1995–1997 ===
Takanohana's total of seven tournament championships by the start of 1995 was the same as the total won by Akebono, who had reached the yokozuna rank two years before him. However, Takanohana now pulled ahead of his rival. He was at his peak as a yokozuna between 1995 and 1997, during which time he won 11 of the 17 tournaments he entered, finishing runner-up in the other six. He produced two more perfect scores of 15–0, in September 1995 and September 1996. Overall he won 80 out of 90 bouts he fought in 1995, 70 out of 75 in 1996, and 78 out 90 in 1997, far ahead of any other wrestler. In three of the tournaments Takanohana did not win during this period, he was defeated by stablemates in playoffs: once to Wakanohana and twice to ōzeki Takanonami. Sumo rules prevent wrestlers from the same heya meeting in regular tournament bouts (playoffs excepted) which meant Takanohana avoided not only his brother and Takanonami but also sekiwake Akinoshima and Takatōriki. The merger of his father's Fujishima stable with his uncle's Futagoyama stable in 1993 had added even more top division wrestlers to this list, giving him an advantage over Akebono, who had to face them all. By September 1996 Takanohana had won 15 tournament championships, and was still only 24 years old. However, after sitting out the first tournament of his career in November 1996 due to a back injury suffered on a regional tour, he put on more weight and began to be more susceptible to injury and illness.

=== 1998–2000 ===
Takanohana was affected by a liver disorder in the first half of 1998, which caused him to withdraw from the January 1998 tournament and miss the opening ceremony of the Winter Olympics in Nagano (his place was taken by Akebono). He pulled out of the March 1998 tournament as well and was still below his best in May. Shunning the traditional treatment methods available from his stable, he turned instead to a physical therapist called Tashiro Tomita, who had a considerable influence over him. He became increasingly isolated from his father and brother, with his father claiming Takanohana had been "brainwashed" by Tomita. Despite his brother's promotion to yokozuna that year, creating the first ever sibling grand champions, the two were barely on speaking terms. Takanohana recovered to win the July and September 1998 tournaments, and was runner-up that November. In 1999, however, he was even more badly affected by injuries, including a dislocated shoulder, and managed only one score in double digits all year.

After making peace with his family, Takanohana regained some of his consistency in 2000, although he was temporarily sidelined by an elbow injury suffered in the July tournament. His brother had retired in March, and several other members of his stable were now past their best. With Akebono dominant once more, his best results that year were two runner-up performances.

=== 2001–2003 ===
Takanohana won his first tournament in over two years in January 2001, winning his first fourteen bouts and then defeating fellow yokozuna Musashimaru in a playoff on the final day. He won his final championship in May 2001, again in a playoff against Musashimaru, but it came at a great cost. He had suffered serious knee ligament damage in a loss to Musōyama on the 14th day but he insisted on fighting until the end of the tournament. As a result, he then missed an unprecedented seven consecutive tournaments, undergoing surgery in Paris in July 2001 and having a lengthy recuperation after that.

Takanohana finally returned to the ring in September 2002, after the Sumo Association declared he must compete or retire. He finished behind Musashimaru on 12–3, the 16th time he had been a tournament runner-up. Considering how long he had been away, it was seen as an impressive comeback. However, he sat out the next tournament with a recurrence of the knee injury. He made another comeback in January 2003, making a late decision to compete. A shoulder injury caused him to miss two days, and after suffering successive losses to Dejima and Aminishiki he announced his retirement. He said he had no regrets and was thankful to have achieved so much in sumo. His father spoke of his relief at the decision, after seeing his son battle through so many injuries. Takanohana's record of 22 tournament championships was the fourth best in sumo history, behind only Taihō, Chiyonofuji and Kitanoumi at the time. Junichiro Koizumi, the Prime Minister, was among those paying tribute. His retirement left no Japanese born wrestlers at the yokozuna rank and was widely regarded as being the end of an era.

Takanohana's danpatsu-shiki, or official retirement ceremony, was held at the Ryōgoku Kokugikan on June 1, 2003. Unusually, Takanohana allowed only 50 guests on stage to take a snip of his hair, instead of the normal 300 to 400. The ceremony, and the party held afterwards at the Imperial Hotel, were both broadcast live on Fuji TV.

== Fighting style ==
Takanohana was largely a yotsu-sumo wrestler, favoring techniques which involved grabbing his opponent's mawashi or belt. His preferred grip was migi-yotsu (right hand inside, left hand outside his opponent). His most common winning kimarite by far was yori-kiri, a simple force out, which accounted for 52 percent of his victories. He also regularly employed uwatenage, or overarm throw, and this was the technique he used to defeat Asashōryū in the second of their two meetings, in September 2002.

== Retirement from sumo ==
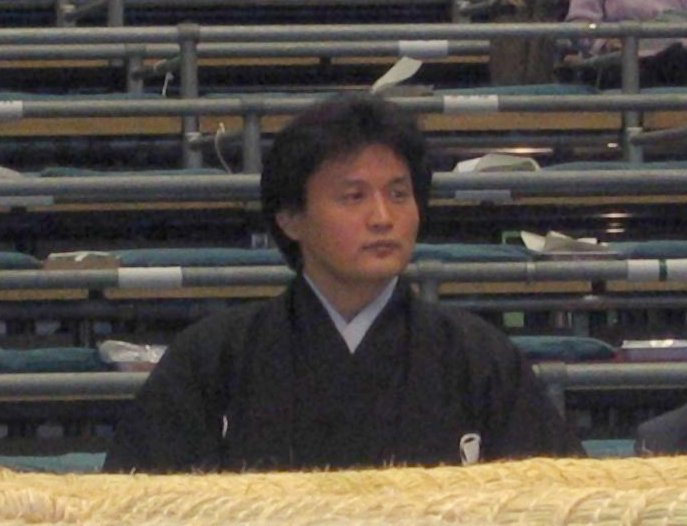
Takanohana as a judge in March 2005

After his retirement he became an elder (or member) of the Japan Sumo Association. Because of his great achievements in sumo he was given a bonus of 130 million yen and was also made a "one generation" elder without having to purchase a share in the Association. This enabled him to keep his fighting name and he was now known as Takanohana Oyakata. With his father's health failing, he took over the operation of his training stable in January 2004, renaming it Takanohana stable. Its last sekitori, Takanonami retired shortly afterwards. During 2008, he added four new recruits to his stable, the first for several years, bringing the total number of wrestlers in his charge up to ten. These include his first foreign recruit, a Mongolian with amateur sumo experience named Takanoiwa, and two twins. In July 2012 Takanohana produced his first sekitori level wrestler when Takanoiwa was promoted to the second highest jūryō division. He won the jūryō championship in January 2013 and a year later was promoted to the top makuuchi division. Takanohana also coached Takakeishō, who reached the top division in January 2017.

Takanohana became a judge of tournament bouts in February 2004, only a year after his retirement, a role for which elders normally have to wait at least four years. After the election of the Association's Board of Directors in February 2008, the Association appointed Takanohana as Associate Manager of Judging (審判部副部長, shimpanbu-fukubuchō), replacing former yokozuna Chiyonofuji who was elected to serve the Board as a director. For an organization that tends to follow seniority over achievement in its organization appointment, it was highly unusual for them to place a 35-year-old to such an influential position. However both former yokozuna, Kitanoumi and Chiyonofuji whom Takanohana is often compared to, served a stint as Associate Manager of Judging prior to their becoming the Board director. In February 2009 he was moved from the judging department to the jungyō (regional tour) department, a less high-profile position.

Takanohana mentioned in October 2009 that he was interested in running for a spot on the Board of Directors in the February 2010 elections, and confirmed in January that he would stand, despite the fact that this would mean opposing the two officially sanctioned candidates of the Nishonoseki ichimon or group of stables. As a result, Takanohana and six of his supporters, Ōtake (the former Takatōriki), Futagoyama (the former Dairyū), Otowayama (the former Takanonami), Tokiwayama (the former Takamisugi), Ōnomatsu (the former Masurao), and Magaki (the former Wakanohana II) left the Nishonoseki ichimon. Takanohana told a press conference, "I will leave the faction. I bid farewell to everyone in my greetings at the meeting. I have stepped into the race as a candidate." The first contested elections since 2002, they took place by secret ballot on February 1, and Takanohana was elected to the board, replacing Ōshima. Seen as a reformer, he favored revamping the current ticket sales system and improving support for ex-rikishi, as well as encouraging sumo in primary schools, raising the pay of gyōji, yobidashi and tokoyama, and making public the Sumo Association's accounts and assets. His victory was praised by the Japanese Prime Minister Yukio Hatoyama, who said Takanohana had let in "a new wind of change." In 2014, the JSA made the decision to recognize the Takanohana group formed from the stables ousted in 2010, as an official ichimon.

In July 2010, in the wake of a scandal involving several wrestlers admitting to illegal gambling, he denied he had connections with members of the yakuza underworld after media reports that he was seen with a mobster during a visit to Ehime Prefecture to recruit new apprentices.

Following the election of Hanaregoma as the new head of the Sumo Association in August 2010, Takanohana returned to the judging department as director of judging. At 38 he was the second youngest director of judging in the history of the Sumo Association. The following month he and his wife were awarded ¥8.47 million in damages by the Tokyo High Court over 13 articles published by the Shukan Gendai and Gekkan Gendai in 2004 and 2005 concerning match-fixing allegations and the controversy over his father's inheritance. He left the judging department once again in 2012 and became the director of the Osaka tournament.

Having reached a peak weight of 160 kg (350 lb) as an active wrestler, he has lost a great deal of weight since his retirement (more than retired wrestlers typically do) and is now around 90 kg (200 lb). In 2009 he published a book detailing his weight loss methods.

He ran for the chairmanship of the Sumo Association in 2016, but was defeated by Hakkaku Oyakata (ex-yokozuna Hokutoumi). Following this he was replaced as General Enterprises Director, seen as the third highest position in the Association's hierarchy, by Kagamiyama Oyakata, and became the jungyo (regional tour) director.

=== Takanoiwa affair and resignation ===
Takanohana was criticized for his delay in notifying the Sumo Association that Takanoiwa would miss the November 2017 tournament because of injuries allegedly sustained in an assault by the yokozuna Harumafuji at a restaurant in Tottori Prefecture in late October. Takanohana reported the incident to the police but did not submit a medical certificate for his wrestler until near the start of the tournament. Takanohana refused to speak to the press about the incident or co-operate with the Sumo Association's investigation. An editorial in the Nikkei Asian Review compared his actions to "an executive withholding from top management information that could rock the company." Sumo writer Chris Gould said Takanohana was under fire for breaking sumo's code of secrecy by going to the police, whereas "in most other sports he'd be lauded as a whistleblowing hero." It was announced after a meeting of sumo elders on December 1, 2017, that Takanohana would only talk to the Sumo Association's crisis management team once the police investigation was concluded. On December 28 an emergency meeting of the board of directors recommended unanimously to dismiss Takanohana as a director for failing to promptly report Takanoiwa's injuries to the Sumo Association, and for failing to co-operate with the investigation. Their recommendation was certified by a meeting of Sumo Association councilors and external members on January 4, with Takanohana demoted two rungs in the hierarchy. It is the first time that a director has been dismissed before the end of his scheduled term. He failed to gain re-election to the board in the February 2018 elections, receiving only two votes in the ballot. The Takanohana group had selected Ōnomatsu Oyakata (the former sekiwake Masurao), as their preferred candidate and he was duly elected, but Takanohana decided to run as well. In March 2018 Takanohana was demoted again, to the lowest rank of toshiyori, due mainly to the behavior of his wrestler Takayoshitoshi, who was suspended for one tournament for punching his attendant in the dressing room after a match. He returned to the shimpan or judging committee.

On September 25, 2018, Takanohana announced his resignation from the Japan Sumo Association, after refusing to disavow the allegations in a letter of complaint that he filed with the Cabinet Office on March 9 over the Association's handling of the Takanoiwa affair. Although he withdrew the letter later that month following Takayoshitoshi's misbehavior, in August the Association demanded that he disavow what he wrote as "totally false", but he refused. He also announced that Takanohana stable will be dissolved with its wrestlers transferring to Chiganoura stable. He called his decision "agonizing and gut-wrenching" but said he could not "bend the truth and say that what was in my complaint was untrue." The JSA in response denied pressuring Takanohana to do this, or to align his stable with an ichimon, and spokesman Shibatayama said they had not yet accepted his resignation as Takanohana had not used the correct documents. They accepted Takanohana's retirement, and the closure of Takanohana stable, on October 1, 2018. He received 10 million yen for retirement and bonuses, and has been allowed to use the name "Takanohana" outside of the sumo world.

In a press conference on May 19, 2019, Takanohana announced he would be establishing the Takanohana Dojo organization to promote sumo worldwide. He also ruled out any suggestion that he would enter Japanese politics.

== Relationship with family ==
The Hanada family had generally received very positive press coverage while Takanohana and Wakanohana were active wrestlers, with the press holding them up as the ideal Japanese family and tending to ignore any splits between them. Their different attitudes towards both sumo philosophy and the outside world had been noted, with Takanohana being regarded as somewhat aloof and reserved and Wakanohana having a warmer personality. However, upon their father's death from cancer on May 30, 2005, a bitter rift between the brothers was widely reported in the Japanese media. Takanohana felt he should be the chief mourner at the funeral as he had remained in the Sumo Association whilst his brother had left to become a TV celebrity, but the role went to Wakanohana as the elder brother, as is traditional. However, with their father reported to have left no will, it was suggested that the feud revolved around control of his estate.

Takanohana also condemned his mother for her extramarital affair, which led to her divorce from his father and exit from the stable in July 2001, and had only been rumored up to that point. She has now reverted to her old name of Noriko Fujita and published a book and appeared on TV, revealing details of life as a stablemaster's wife that are seldom heard outside the sumo world. Takanohana has rarely spoken to her since. In June 2008 he spoke of his distress at the news that she had been named as a defence witness in a civil lawsuit brought by the Sumo Association against the tabloid magazine Shūkan Gendai over allegations that his father benefited from a thrown match for the championship in 1975, saying, "she will essentially be fighting against me." He said he would take responsibility by resigning from the Sumo Association if she took the stand. In a radio interview Fujita said she would not testify, saying, "I will not drag my child down".

== Marriage ==
In late 1992 Takanohana announced his engagement to actress Rie Miyazawa, news which sparked a similar amount of coverage to the Japanese royal wedding held that year. However the engagement was broken off the following year, reportedly because Miyazawa was seen by Takanohana's parents and the Sumo Association as being unwilling to sacrifice her career to become a regular stable wife. The role of the wife of a head coach in looking after the stable's recruits and liaising with supporter's groups is regarded as a full-time job. In May 1995 Takanohana married television announcer Keiko Kono, eight years older than him. They have a son and two daughters. His son Yuuichi is a shoemaker and radio personality who is married to the daughter of former sumo wrestler Fujinoshin. It was reported in November 2018 that Takanohana and Kono had divorced.

In September 2023, Takanohana's management office confirmed that he had married another woman in August 2023; the new spouse's identity was not disclosed.

== Career record ==
Takanohana Kōji
Year	January Hatsu basho, Tokyo	March Haru basho, Osaka	May Natsu basho, Tokyo	July Nagoya basho, Nagoya	September Aki basho, Tokyo	November Kyūshū basho, Fukuoka
1988	x	(Maezumō)	East Jonokuchi #11; 5–2	West Jonidan #101; 6–1	West Jonidan #31; 6–1	East Sandanme #74; 5–2
1989	East Sandanme #41; 5–2	West Sandanme #13; 5–2	East Makushita #48; 7–0; Champion	East Makushita #6; 3–4	West Makushita #9; 7–0; Champion	West Jūryō #10; 8–7
1990	West Jūryō #6; 9–6	West Jūryō #3; 9–6	East Maegashira #14; 4–11	East Jūryō #5; 8–7	East Jūryō #2; 10–5	West Maegashira #12; 8–7
1991	West Maegashira #9; 6–9	East Maegashira #13; 12–3; TF	West Maegashira #1; 9–6; O★	West Komusubi #1; 11–4; TO	West Sekiwake #1; 7–8	East Maegashira #1; 7–8
1992	East Maegashira #2; 14–1; TOF	West Sekiwake #1; 5–10	West Maegashira #2; 9–6	East Komusubi #2; 8–7	West Komusubi #1; 14–1; O	West Sekiwake #1; 10–5
1993	East Sekiwake #1; 11–4	East Ōzeki #1; 11–4	East Ōzeki #1; 14–1	East Ōzeki #1; 13–2–P	East Ōzeki #1; 12–3	East Ōzeki #1; 7–8
1994	West Ōzeki #1; 14–1	East Ōzeki #1; 11–4	West Ōzeki #1; 14–1	East Ōzeki #1; 11–4	West Ōzeki #2; 15–0	East Ōzeki #1; 15–0
1995	East Yokozuna #1; 13–2–P	East Yokozuna #1; 13–2	West Yokozuna #1; 14–1	East Yokozuna #1; 13–2	East Yokozuna #1; 15–0	East Yokozuna #1; 12–3–P
1996	East Yokozuna #1; 14–1–P	East Yokozuna #1; 14–1	East Yokozuna #1; 14–1	East Yokozuna #1; 13–2	East Yokozuna #1; 15–0	East Yokozuna #1; Sat out due to injury 0–0–15
1997	West Yokozuna #1; 13–2	East Yokozuna #1; 12–3–PP	East Yokozuna #1; 13–2–P	East Yokozuna #1; 13–2	East Yokozuna #1; 13–2–P	East Yokozuna #1; 14–1–P
1998	East Yokozuna #1; 8–5–2	West Yokozuna #1; 1–4–10	West Yokozuna #1; 10–5	West Yokozuna #1; 14–1	East Yokozuna #1; 13–2	East Yokozuna #1; 12–3
1999	East Yokozuna #1; 8–7	West Yokozuna #1; 8–3–4	East Yokozuna #1; Sat out due to injury 0–0–15	West Yokozuna #2; 9–6	East Yokozuna #2; 0–3–12	West Yokozuna #2; 11–4
2000	West Yokozuna #1; 12–3	East Yokozuna #1; 11–4	West Yokozuna #1; 13–2	West Yokozuna #1; 5–3–7	East Yokozuna #2; Sat out due to injury 0–0–15	East Yokozuna #2; 11–4
2001	East Yokozuna #2; 14–1–P	East Yokozuna #1; 12–3	East Yokozuna #1; 13–2–P	East Yokozuna #1; Sat out due to injury 0–0–15	West Yokozuna #1; Sat out due to injury 0–0–15	West Yokozuna #1; Sat out due to injury 0–0–15
2002	West Yokozuna #1; Sat out due to injury 0–0–15	West Yokozuna #1; Sat out due to injury 0–0–15	West Yokozuna #1; Sat out due to injury 0–0–15	West Yokozuna #1; Sat out due to injury 0–0–15	West Yokozuna #1; 12–3	West Yokozuna #1; Sat out due to injury 0–0–15
2003	West Yokozuna #1; Retired; 4–4–1	x	x	x	x	x
Record given as wins–losses–absences Top division champion Top division runner-up Retired Non-participation Jūryō Lower divisions Sanshō key: F=Fighting spirit; O=Outstanding performance; T=Technique Also shown: ★=Kinboshi; P=Playoff(s); Divisions: Makuuchi — Jūryō — Makushita — Sandanme — Jonidan — Jonokuchi Makuuchi ranks: Yokozuna — Ōzeki — Sekiwake — Komusubi — Maegashira

== See also ==
- List of yokozuna
- List of sumo tournament top division champions
- List of sumo tournament top division runners-up
- List of sumo record holders
- Glossary of sumo terms
- List of past sumo wrestlers

Preceded by Akebono Tarō	65th Yokozuna; 1994–2003	Succeeded by Wakanohana Masaru
Yokozuna is not a successive rank, and more than one wrestler can hold the title at once
