= Wakanohana Kanji II =

Japanese sumo wrestler (1953–2022)

Wakanohana Kanji
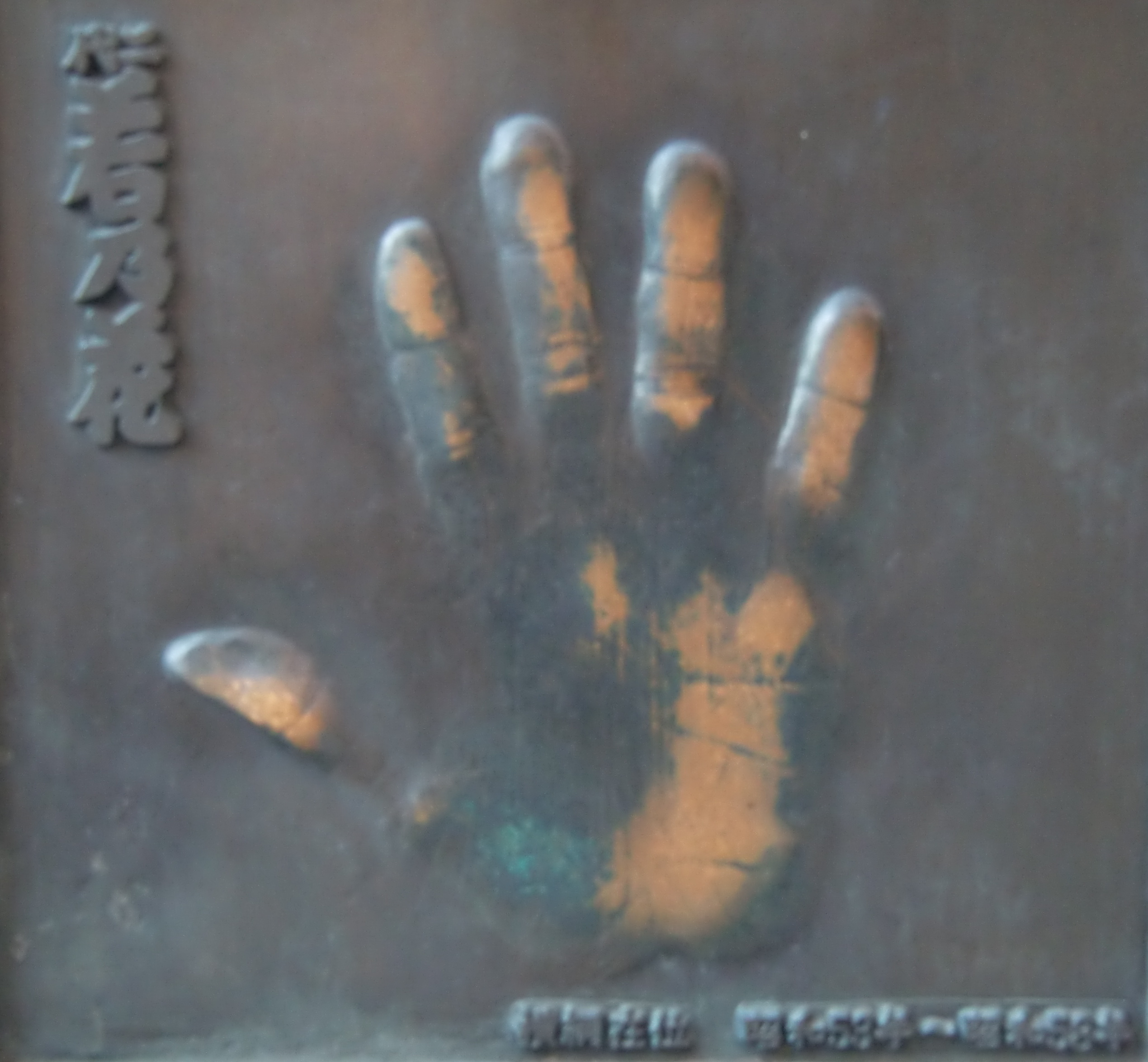

Personal information
- Native name: 若乃花 幹士
- Born: Katsunori Shimoyama; 3 April 1953 Ōwani, Aomori, Japan
- Died: 16 July 2022 (aged 69) Osaka, Japan
- Height: 1.86 m (6 ft 1 in)
- Weight: 129 kg (284 lb)

Sport
- Sport: Sumo
- Retired: January 1983
- Heya: Futagoyama
- Record: 656–323–85
- Debut: July 1968
- Highest rank: Yokozuna (May 1978)
- Elder name: Magaki
- Championships: 4 (Makuuchi)
- Special Prizes: Outstanding Performance (2); Technique (4)
- Gold Stars: 3 (Kitanoumi)
- Updated on June 2020

Wakanohana Kanji (Japanese: 若乃花 幹士; 3 April 1953 — 16 July 2022) was a Japanese professional sumo wrestler from Ōwani, Aomori. He was the sport's 56th yokozuna. He was popular with sumo fans and was well-known for his rivalry with Kitanoumi. After retirement, he became the head coach of Magaki stable. Due to poor health, he left the Japan Sumo Association in December 2013. He died of lung cancer in July 2022 at the age of 69.

== Early career ==
Born as Katsunori Shimoyama (下山 勝則) in Aomori Prefecture on 3 April 1953, he began his sumo career as a 15-year-old in July 1968. He joined Futagoyama stable at the same time as another future yokozuna, Takanosato, who came from the same area of Japan. Both were recruited by former yokozuna Wakanohana Kanji I, also from Aomori. Initially fighting under his real name, he took on the shikona or ring name surname of Asanohana (朝ノ花) in March 1971. He changed his ring name to Wakamisugi Kanji (若三杉 幹士) in January 1973. It took him five years to reach the status of a salaried sekitori wrestler, when he broke into the jūryō division in May 1973. He was promoted to the top makuuchi division in November 1973. In July 1974, he changed his shikona given name to Toshihito (壽人). From September 1974 to January 1975 he won three consecutive technique prizes and was promoted to sekiwake. Over the next two years he had some up and down results, but from September 1976 to January 1977 at sekiwake rank he put together three 11–4 marks, won three more special prizes and was promoted to ōzeki. In May 1977 he won his first yūshō, or tournament championship, with a 13–2 record.

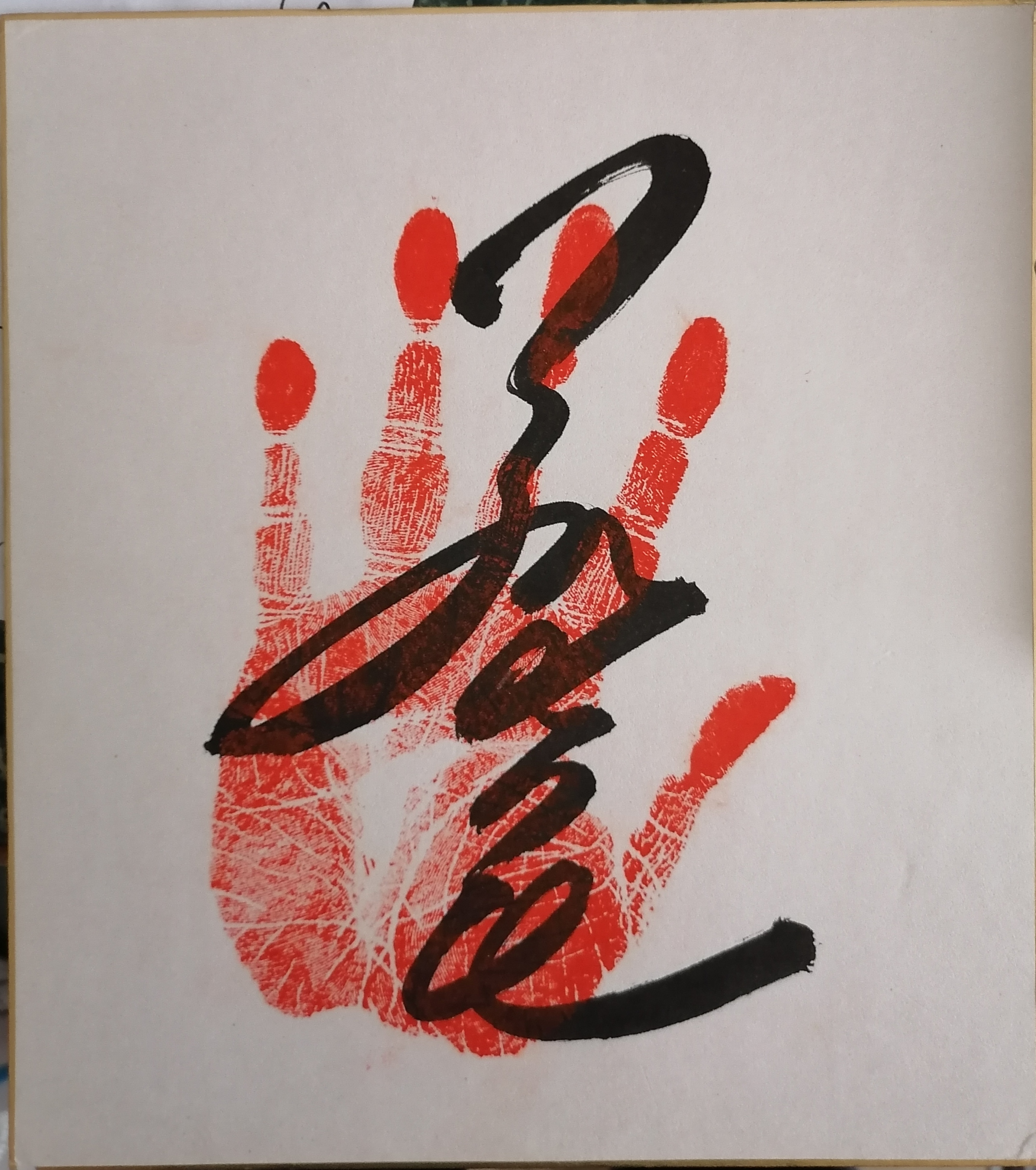
Original tegata (handprint and signature) of sumo wrestler Yokozuna Wakanohana II

== Yokozuna ==
In July 1978, he changed his ring name to Wakanohana Kanji, which was the shikona of his stablemaster at Futagoyama, the former Wakanohana Kanji I. That year he emerged as the chief rival to yokozuna Kitanoumi, as the other grand champion at the time, Wajima, was producing inconsistent results. Wakanohana finished runner-up to Kitanoumi in January 1978 and then fought two playoffs with him for the yūshō in March and May. Although he was not able to win either, his record of 40 wins out of a possible 45 over the last three tournaments was enough for promotion to yokozuna. Indeed, it was the best postwar total for any yokozuna candidate.

Wakanohana had reached sumo's top rank at the age of just 25, and his good looks and exciting fighting style meant he was popular with sumo fans in comparison to his rival yokozuna Kitanoumi. He won three further tournaments, in November 1978 (with a perfect 15–0 score), May 1979 and September 1980. However he seemed burdened by the Wakanohana name, and in 1981 he was also pressured into marrying the daughter of his stablemaster. During this brief and unhappy marriage he won no tournament championships and was frequently absent from the dohyō due to injury and illness. The couple divorced shortly before Wakanohana announced his retirement from sumo in January 1983 at the relatively early age of 29, ending a career with four top division championships and six special prizes. Later in 1983, he married his long-time girlfriend, a club hostess.

== Retirement from the ring ==
No longer able to take over Futagoyama stable due to his divorce, in December 1983 Wakanohana instead established his own stable, Magaki, and became known as Magaki Oyakata. He raised eight of his wrestlers to elite sekitori status. He was a senior member of the Japan Sumo Association, serving as a director from 1998, where he was responsible for the running of the honbasho held in Osaka each year. In 2005 his second wife died. While attending the Osaka tournament in March 2007 he collapsed and had to undergo emergency surgery for a cerebral hemorrhage. From then on he used a wheelchair, and was unable to take much of an active role in running the stable.

In May 2008 it emerged that he had beaten one of his wrestlers with a bamboo stick. Although such rough treatment of juniors was not uncommon at sumo stables in the past, since the death of trainee Takashi Saito at the Tokitsukaze stable in 2007 coaches have been instructed to cut out the practice. The Sumo Association reprimanded him by giving him a 30% pay cut for three months. Kokonoe-oyakata the former Chiyonofuji and head of the Sumo Association's public relations division, criticised Magaki for initially attempting to justify his actions, saying "In addition to his excessive punishment of the wrestler, he invited misunderstanding that such actions are common in all stables."

In August 2008 he resigned from the board of directors after the top ranking wrestler at Magaki stable, maegashira Wakanohō, was expelled from sumo after being arrested for possession of cannabis. He was, however, repromoted in February 2009.

Along with five other oyakata (Ōtake, Ōnomatsu, Otowayama, Tokiwayama and Futagoyama), he was forced to leave the Nishonoseki ichimon or group of stables in January 2010 after declaring his support for Takanohana's unsanctioned bid to be elected to the board of directors of the Sumo Association.

Due to his poor health, Magaki stable was wound up after the March 2013 honbasho and he, along with the remaining wrestlers transferred to Isegahama stable (2007). In December 2013 it was announced that he would leave the Sumo Association, five years before the mandatory retirement age of 65. He subsequently sold the Magaki title to Tokitenkū in May 2014, making Tokitenkū the first Mongolian-born wrestler to acquire elder stock in the association. Out of favour with the sumo establishment, he made an appearance on the former Takatoriki's controversial YouTube channel in 2020.

Wakanohana was diagnosed with lung cancer in April 2021. He died on 16 July 2022 at a hospital in Osaka at the age of 69.

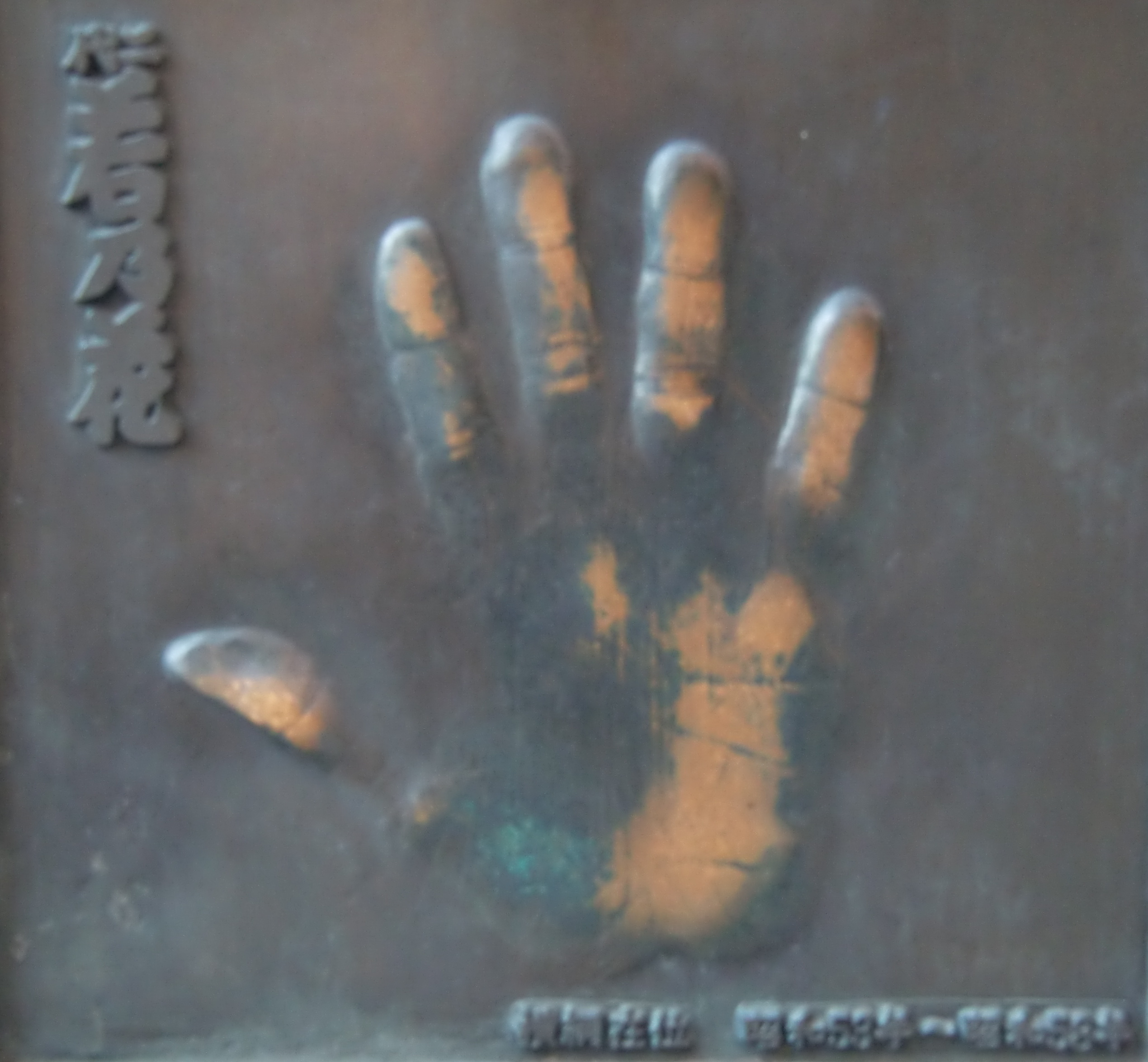
Wakanohana's handprint displayed on a monument in Ryōgoku, Tokyo

== Fighting style ==
Wakanohana was well known for his flexible body and balance, and his powerful right arm throw, uwatenage, which he officially used 102 times in competition. He also frequently won by yori kiri (force out) and sotogake (outer leg trip).

== Career record ==
Wakanohana Kanji
Year	January Hatsu basho, Tokyo	March Haru basho, Osaka	May Natsu basho, Tokyo	July Nagoya basho, Nagoya	September Aki basho, Tokyo	November Kyūshū basho, Fukuoka
1968	x	x	x	(Maezumo)	East Jonokuchi #7; 4–3	West Jonidan #68; 5–2
1969	West Jonidan #16; 6–1	East Sandanme #70; 5–2	West Sandanme #44; 5–2	West Sandanme #20; 4–3	West Sandanme #7; 5–2	East Makushita #47; 3–4
1970	East Makushita #53; 1–6	East Sandanme #19; 0–1–6	East Sandanme #55; 6–1	East Sandanme #20; 6–1	West Makushita #47; 5–2	West Makushita #28; 4–3
1971	West Makushita #22; 3–4	East Makushita #29; 5–2	East Makushita #16; 4–3	West Makushita #10; 2–5	West Makushita #25; 0–1–6	East Makushita #55; 5–2
1972	West Makushita #38; 3–1–3	West Makushita #43; 6–1	West Makushita #17; 4–3	West Makushita #12; 4–3	West Makushita #10; 4–3	East Makushita #8; 4–3
1973	East Makushita #7; 5–2	West Makushita #1; 3–4	West Makushita #3; 5–2	West Jūryō #13; 10–5	West Jūryō #5; 10–5	East Maegashira #13; 6–9
1974	West Jūryō #2; 8–7	East Maegashira #13; 8–7	East Maegashira #11; 9–6	East Maegashira #6; 8–7	East Maegashira #3; 10–5; T	West Komusubi #1; 11–4; T
1975	West Sekiwake #1; 9–6; T	East Sekiwake #1; 9–6	East Sekiwake #1; 2–8–5	East Maegashira #8; 9–6	West Maegashira #2; 9–6 ★	West Komusubi #1; 8–7
1976	West Komusubi #1; 4–11	West Maegashira #4; 9–6 ★	East Komusubi; 7–8	East Maegashira #1; 9–6 ★	West Sekiwake #1; 11–4; T	East Sekiwake #1; 11–4; O
1977	East Sekiwake #1; 11–4; O	West Ōzeki #1; 9–6	West Ōzeki #1; 13–2	East Ōzeki #1; 10–5	East Ōzeki #1; 10–5	West Ōzeki #1; 10–5
1978	East Ōzeki #1; 13–2	East Ōzeki #1; 13–2–P	East Ōzeki #1; 14–1–P	West Yokozuna #1; 11–4	East Yokozuna #2; 12–3	West Yokozuna #1; 15–0
1979	East Yokozuna #1; 11–4	West Yokozuna #1; 12–3	West Yokozuna #1; 14–1	East Yokozuna #1; 11–4	West Yokozuna #2; 11–4	East Yokozuna #2; 12–3
1980	West Yokozuna-Ōzeki #1; 11–4	East Yokozuna #2; 12–3	West Yokozuna #1; 12–3	West Yokozuna #1; 10–5	West Yokozuna #1; 14–1	East Yokozuna #1; 13–2
1981	West Yokozuna #1; 10–5	East Yokozuna #2; 3–4–8	West Yokozuna-Ōzeki #1; 0–3–12	West Yokozuna-Ōzeki #1; Sat out due to injury 0–0–15	East Yokozuna #2; 11–4	East Yokozuna #1; Sat out due to injury 0–0–15
1982	East Yokozuna #2; 9–6	East Yokozuna #2; 11–4	East Yokozuna #2; 12–3	West Yokozuna #1; 11–4	West Yokozuna #1; 10–5	West Yokozuna #1; Sat out due to injury 0–0–15
1983	West Yokozuna #2; Retired; 2–4	x	x	x	x	x
Record given as wins–losses–absences Top division champion Top division runner-up Retired Lower divisions Non-participation Sanshō key: F=Fighting spirit; O=Outstanding performance; T=Technique Also shown: ★=Kinboshi; P=Playoff(s); Divisions: Makuuchi — Jūryō — Makushita — Sandanme — Jonidan — Jonokuchi Makuuchi ranks: Yokozuna — Ōzeki — Sekiwake — Komusubi — Maegashira

== See also ==
- Glossary of sumo terms
- List of past sumo wrestlers
- List of sumo tournament top division champions
- List of sumo tournament top division runners-up
- List of yokozuna

Preceded by Kitanoumi Toshimitsu	56th Yokozuna; 1978–1983	Succeeded by Mienoumi Tsuyoshi
Yokozuna is not a successive rank, and more than one wrestler can hold the title at once
