= Minezaki stable =

Defunct sumo stable

Coordinates: 35.7664°N 139.6454°E

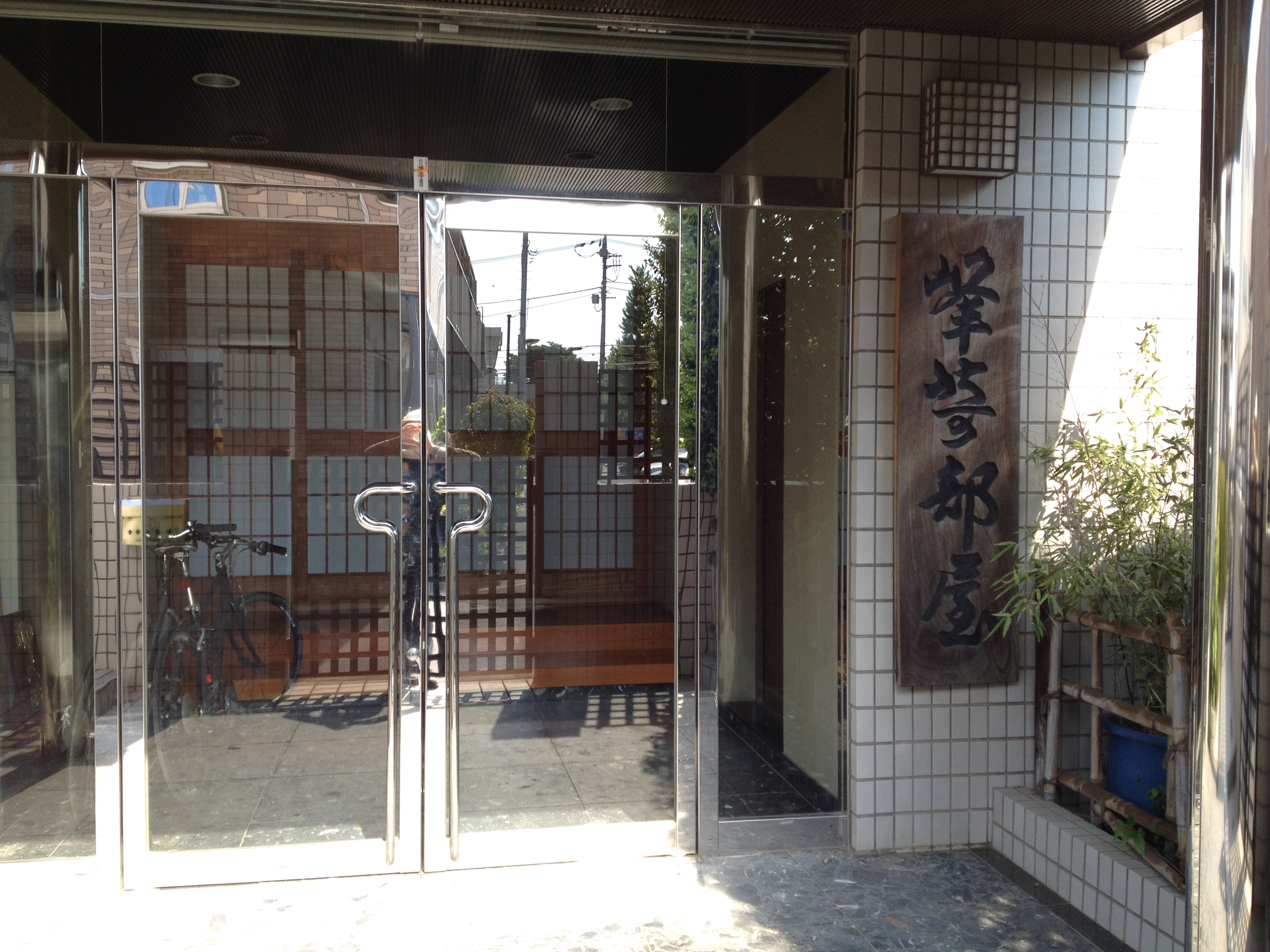

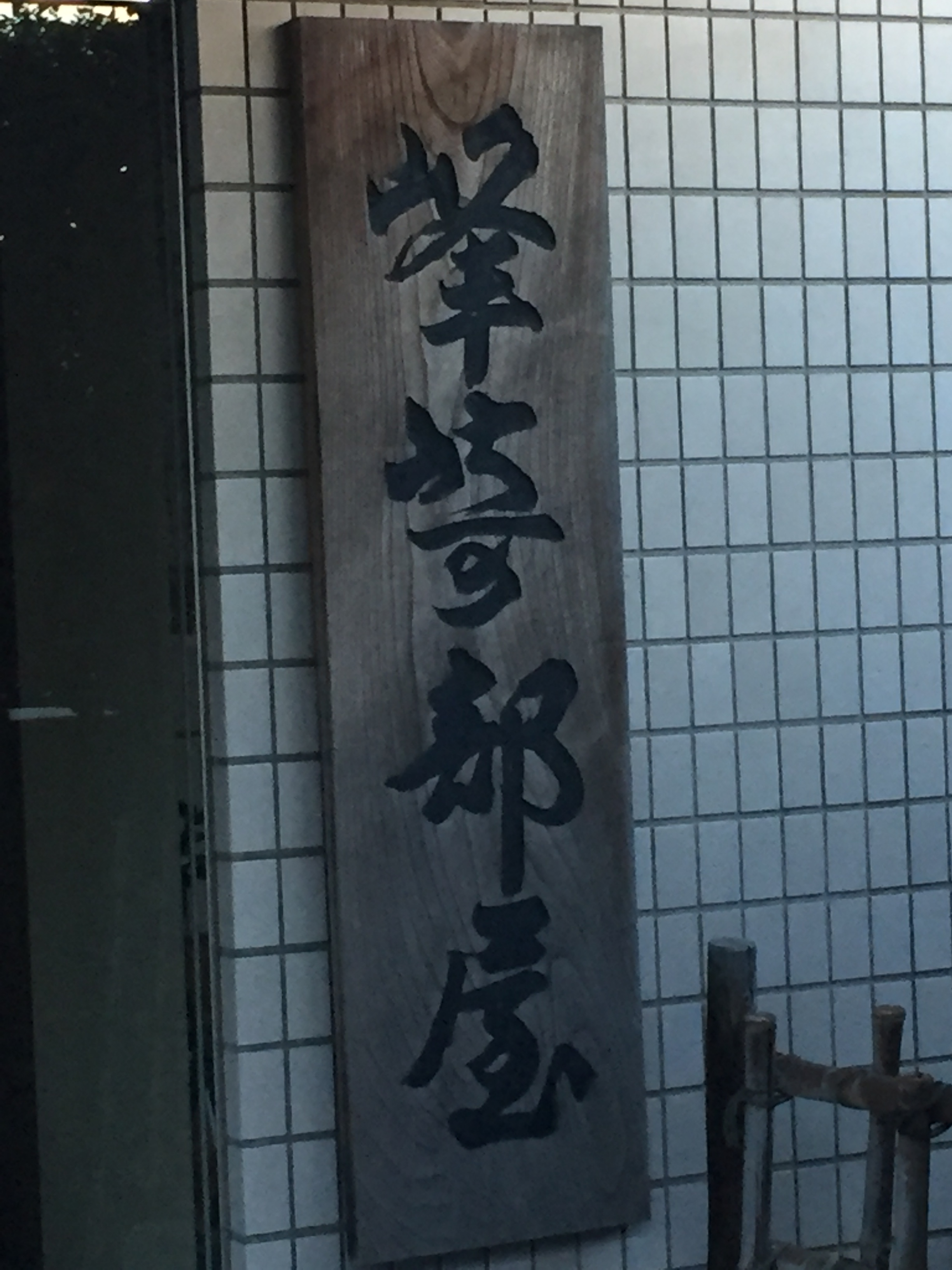

Minezaki stable (峰崎部屋, Minezaki-beya) (1988–2021) was a sumo stable of the Nishonoseki group.

It was founded in December 1988 by Misugiiso, who branched off from the Hanaregoma stable and enrolled his younger brother as a wrestler. As of January 2021 it had seven wrestlers. It was located in the Nerima ward of Tokyo. After the May 2012 tournament it absorbed Hanakago stable, run by former sekiwake Daijuyama, who became an assistant coach. The stable never produced a sekitori wrestler on its own, but inherited Arawashi, previously of Hanakago and before that Araiso stable, who first reached jūryō in July 2011. Minezaki stable already had a Mongolian wrestler, Torugawa, but was allowed to take another foreigner because of the merger. Hanakago stable's Ryūkiyama from South Korea was allowed to transfer for the same reason.

In March 2018, it emerged that a junior wrestler at the stable had been the victim of physical assault by a more senior wrestler and retired as a result. The incidents were not reported to Minezaki at the time and he found out only after the victim's father sent him a letter saying his son was beaten four times at the stable between September 2017 and January 2018. The wrestler who allegedly carried out the assault was given a one tournament suspension by the Japan Sumo Association on March 29 and Minezaki was given a 10% salary reduction for two months.

The demotion of Arawashi to makushita in July 2019 and subsequent retirement in January 2020 left the stable with no sekitori. It closed after the March 2021 tournament, ahead of Minezaki reaching the mandatory retirement age of 65 in May, with its wrestlers, head coach and makuuchi referee transferring to Shibatayama stable. Other personnel were split between the Takadagawa and Nishiiwa stables.

== Owner ==
- 1988–2021: 7th Minezaki (iin, maegashira Misugiiso)

== Former wrestlers ==
- Arawashi (maegashira 2)

== Coach ==
- Hanakago Tadaaki (iin, sekiwake, Daijuyama)

== Referees ==
- Kimura Ginjirō (makuuchi gyōji, real name Noriyuki Itoi)
- Kimura Mitsunosuke (jūryō gyōji, real name Makoto Kawahara)
- Kimura Kazuma (makushita gyoji, real name Kazuma Okada)

== Ushers ==
- Hiroyuki (jūryō yobidashi, real name Hiroyuki Kon)
- Masao (jūryō yobidashi, real name Noriyuki Ōtaka)

== Hairdresser ==
- Tokoaki (fourth class tokoyama)

== Location and Access ==
Tokyo, Nerima Ward, Tagara 2–20–3
Nearest station: Chikatetsu Akatsuka Station on the Yūrakuchō Line

== See also ==
- List of sumo stables
- List of sumo elders
- List of active sumo wrestlers
- List of past sumo wrestlers
- List of years in sumo
- Glossary of sumo terms
