= Araiso stable =

Defunct sumo stable

Araiso stable (荒磯部屋, Araiso-beya) (1993–2008) was a sumo stable of the Nishonoseki group.

Spanning 15 years and 92 tournaments, the stable was home to a total of 13 wrestlers, of which none were able to reach salaried rank, with two climbing as high as mid-makushita, the third highest division.

It was established in July 1993 by former komusubi Futagodake, a coach since 1976, and two wrestlers branching out from Futagoyama stable, and closed after the September 2008 tournament. Futagodake who was due to reach the mandatory retirement age of 65, then briefly worked at Matsugane stable until his official departure in November 2008.

At the stable's dissolution, two of the three remaining low-ranking wrestlers chose retirement over being transferred to a different stable. Only makushita-ranked Arawashi continued his career, first at Hanakago stable, until their closure in May 2012, then at Minezaki stable, where he established himself as a late-blooming maegashira before retiring in January 2020.

== Owners ==
- 1993–2008: 12th Araiso (iin, komusubi, Futagodake, born 1943) – founder and sole coach.

== Notable wrestlers ==
- Arawashi (maegashira 2, born 1986) – Mongolian national, took 11 years to reach makuuchi, awarded 3 gold stars.

== Location and access ==
- Tokyo Metropolis, Kunitachi City, Yaho Neighborhood, 9562-2.

9 minute walk from Yaho Station on Nambu Line.

== See also ==
- List of sumo stables
- List of sumo elders
- List of active sumo wrestlers
- List of past sumo wrestlers
- List of years in sumo
- Glossary of sumo terms
