= Masaru Maeta =

Japanese sumo wrestler (1982–2020)

Personal information
- Native name: 前田勝
- Born: June 24, 1982 Tsuruoka, Yamagata
- Died: August 26, 2020 (aged 38)
- Height: 1.80 m (5 ft 11 in)
- Weight: 213 kg (470 lb)

Sport
- Sport: Sumo
- Rank: see below
- University team: Nihon University
- Retired: September 2018
- Heya: Hanaregoma → Shibatayama
- Debut: March 2005
- Highest rank: Makushita 3 (July 2010)
- Championships: 1 (Makushita); 1 (Sandanme)
- Updated on April 7, 2021

Masaru Maeta (前田勝, Maeta Masaru), known by his shikona Maeta (前田), (24 June 1982 – 26 August 2020) was a Japanese sumo wrestler from the city of Tsuruoka in Yamagata Prefecture. He was a former amateur sumo competitor for Nihon University and made his professional debut in 2005. His sumo stable was Shibatayama and previously he belonged to Hanaregoma. His height was 180 cm (5 ft 11 in) and his peak weight was 213 kg (470 lb). His highest rank was makushita 3. He retired in 2018.

== Career ==
He initially did football and swimming at elementary school but switched to sumo as his weight increased, as he was already over 100 kg by third grade. He was a contemporary of future maegashira Ōiwato. He was a winner of national sumo competitions in consecutive years in the fifth and sixth grades and won the Wanpaku Yokozuna title. He was a graduate of Saitama Sakae High School and Nihon University, although he did not manage to progress past the top 8 of the All Japan Sumo Championships. He joined the Hanaregoma stable run by the former ōzeki Kaiketsu in March 2005. He was an admirer of Shunketsu, a member of the same stable. He already weighed 200 kg at his debut, and his peak weight of 213 kg (470 lb) in March 2010 means he ranks sixteenth in the list of heaviest sumo wrestlers. In March 2006 he won the sandanme division championship or yūshō with a perfect 7–0 record, and his hometown of Kushibiki organized a celebratory party for him. He was also undefeated in regulation bouts in the March 2009 tournament in the same division, although he lost a playoff for the championship. His second yūshō came in May 2010 in the makushita division, also with a perfect 7–0 score. This performance saw him promoted to his highest rank in his career of Makushita 3 in July 2010. He failed in his bid to become a sekitori in this tournament, scoring only 1–6. This tournament also saw his only bout against a jūryō ranked wrestler, Masuraumi. In January 2013 Hanaregoma stable closed and he was transferred to Shibatayama stable. He suffered an achilles injury during the July 2016 tournament and missed the two following tournaments as well, resulting in him falling to the jonokuchi division. In his comeback tournament in January 2017 he won his first five bouts but was then knocked out cold in his sixth match against Kinjo and lay on the dohyō for several moments before being attended to. He withdrew from the tournament the next day. He announced his retirement in September 2018.

== Retirement ==
After leaving sumo he was based in Hachimantai, Iwate and employed by a company called Sanken Soil involved in the analysis of fertilizer products. He was a member of the company's sumo club and also taught sumo to elementary and junior high school students in the city three times a week. It was during one of these teaching sessions on 26 August 2020 that he collapsed and died later in hospital of a myocardial infarction. He was 38 years old.

== Fighting style ==
His favourite techniques were hidari yotsu (a right hand outside, left hand inside grip on his opponent's mawashi) and yori-kiri.

== Career record ==
Masaru Maeta
Year	January Hatsu basho, Tokyo	March Haru basho, Osaka	May Natsu basho, Tokyo	July Nagoya basho, Nagoya	September Aki basho, Tokyo	November Kyūshū basho, Fukuoka
2005	x	(Maezumo)	East Jonokuchi #13; 6–1	West Jonidan #60; 5–2	East Jonidan #21; 6–1	East Sandanme #58; 4–3
2006	West Sandanme #42; 4–3	East Sandanme #29; 7–0; Champion	West Makushita #19; 3–4	East Makushita #25; 4–3	West Makushita #18; 5–2	West Makushita #8; 4–3
2007	East Makushita #6; 2–5	East Makushita #21; 2–5	West Makushita #40; 2–5	East Makushita #57; 4–3	West Makushita #46; 3–4	West Makushita #57; 2–4–1
2008	East Sandanme #16; 4–3	West Sandanme #4; 5–2	West Makushita #45; 4–3	West Makushita #36; 2–5	West Makushita #54; 3–4	East Sandanme #6; 5–2
2009	East Makushita #47; 3–4	West Sandanme #1; 7–0	West Makushita #11; 2–5	West Makushita #23; 2–5	West Makushita #37; 2–5	West Makushita #53; 3–4
2010	West Sandanme #5; 6–1	West Makushita #30; 3–4	West Makushita #35; 7–0; Champion	West Makushita #3; 1–6	West Makushita #20; 3–4	West Makushita #25; 2–5
2011	East Makushita #40; 3–4	East Makushita #48; Tournament Cancelled; Match fixing investigation 0–0–0	East Makushita #48; 5–2	West Makushita #20; 4–3	East Makushita #14; 3–4	West Makushita #18; 3–4
2012	West Makushita #24; 4–3	East Makushita #19; 3–4	West Makushita #26; 2–5	West Makushita #38; 4–3	East Makushita #33; 5–2	East Makushita #21; 2–5
2013	West Makushita #32; 4–3	East Makushita #25; 4–3	West Makushita #17; 2–5	East Makushita #34; 5–2	East Makushita #22; 4–3	East Makushita #16; 2–5
2014	West Makushita #31; 2–5	West Makushita #47; 1–6	East Sandanme #22; 3–4	West Sandanme #37; 4–3	East Sandanme #23; 5–2	West Makushita #59; 3–4
2015	West Sandanme #10; 4–3	East Makushita #60; 2–5	West Sandanme #29; 5–2	East Sandanme #3; 3–4	West Sandanme #17; 4–3	East Sandanme #7; 3–4
2016	West Sandanme #21; 6–1	East Makushita #42; 2–5	East Sandanme #2; 2–5	West Sandanme #25; 0–3–4	East Sandanme #76; Sat out due to injury 0–0–7	East Jonidan #37; Sat out due to injury 0–0–7
2017	West Jonokuchi #10; 5–1–1	East Jonidan #59; Sat out due to injury 0–0–7	West Jonokuchi #1; 4–3	West Jonidan #76; 6–1	West Jonidan #5; 3–4	West Jonidan #16; 5–2
2018	West Sandanme #80; 1–6	East Jonidan #14; 4–3	East Sandanme #96; 3–4	East Jonidan #16; 2–5	West Jonidan #57; Retired; 2–5	x
Record given as wins–losses–absences Top division champion Top division runner-up Retired Lower divisions Non-participation Sanshō key: F=Fighting spirit; O=Outstanding performance; T=Technique Also shown: ★=Kinboshi; P=Playoff(s); Divisions: Makuuchi — Jūryō — Makushita — Sandanme — Jonidan — Jonokuchi Makuuchi ranks: Yokozuna — Ōzeki — Sekiwake — Komusubi — Maegashira

== See also ==
- Glossary of sumo terms
- List of past sumo wrestlers
