= Hanakago =

Hanakago (花籠) is a Japanese language term and means "flower basket". In Japanese bamboo weaving, a flower basket is used in ikebana and sometimes also used in Japanese tea ceremony.

Named after it are:

- Hanakago stable (花籠部屋, Hanakago beya), a stable of sumo wrestlers
- Hanakago stable (1992), a later incarnation of the stable
- Hanakago (toshiyori), a sumo toshiyori held by Daijuyama Tadaaki as of 2020
