= Daijuyama Tadaaki =

Sumo wrestler

Personal information
- Native name: 太寿山 忠明
- Born: Tadaaki Sakazume; 8 April 1959 (age 67) Niigata, Japan
- Height: 1.83 m (6 ft 0 in)
- Weight: 159 kg (351 lb)

Sport
- Sport: Sumo
- Retired: May, 1991
- Heya: Futagoyama
- Record: 585-618-28
- Debut: March, 1975
- Highest rank: Sekiwake (November, 1981)
- Elder name: Hanakago
- Special Prizes: Outstanding Performance (1); Fighting Spirit (3)
- Gold Stars: 7 Kitanoumi (4); Chiyonofuji (3)
- Updated on February 2010

Daijuyama Tadaaki (太寿山 忠明, born 8 April 1959 as Tadaaki Sakazume (坂爪 忠明, Sakazume Tadaaki)) is a former sumo wrestler from Niitsu, Niigata Prefecture, Japan. He made his professional debut in 1975, reaching the top makuuchi division in 1980. He was ranked in makuuchi for 64 tournaments, winning four special prizes, and seven gold stars for defeating yokozuna. He was a runner-up to Chiyonofuji in the July 1982 tournament. His highest rank was sekiwake. He retired in 1991 and became an elder of the Japan Sumo Association. He re-established the Hanakago stable in 1992 and produced his first top division wrestler Kōryū in 2008. The stable folded in 2012 and he moved to Minezaki stable to work as an assistant coach before retiring in March 2024.

== Career ==
He joined Futagoyama stable in March 1975 at the age of 16, recruited by the former yokozuna Wakanohana I. Joining the stable at the same time as him was future ozeki Wakashimazu. It took him about five years to make the sekitori ranks, climbing the divisions steadily without picking up any yusho or championships along the way. In January 1980 he broke into the jūryō division, and after four kachi-koshi winning scores he was promoted to the top makuuchi division that September. He fell back to jūryō after only two tournaments, but returned in March 1981. In September of that year he scored an impressive ten wins, defeating yokozuna Kitanoumi to earn his first kinboshi. He was rewarded with his first special prize, for Fighting Spirit, and promotion to the sanyaku ranks at sekiwake, which was to be the highest rank he was to achieve.

In November 1982 he was runner-up in a tournament for the first time, finishing alongside Wakanohana II, Kotokaze and Koboyama on 11-4, one win behind tournament winner Chiyonofuji on 12-3. In the following tournament he defeated Kitanoumi and Chiyonofuji in the first two days, winning the Outstanding Performance prize and promotion back to sekiwake. After fighting at komusubi in March 1983 he was injured and although he recovered, he did not manage to make the sanyaku ranks again until May 1988. In July 1989, at the age of 30, he produced a strong 11-4 record and won the Fighting Spirit prize for the third time, earning one last promotion to the titled ranks in the following September tournament. He defeated yokozuna Onokuni in this tournament, but fell short with a 5-10 record. In May 1991 he announced his retirement after scoring only 3-12 at maegashira 14, rather than face demotion to jūryō.

His nickname amongst Japanese sumo fans was "Moomin", because of his facial resemblance to the hippo-like cartoon characters.

== Retirement from sumo ==
He remained in the sumo world as a coach, initially at his old stable, but in late 1992 he branched out and re-established the Hanakago stable, the previous incarnation of which had been wound up in 1985 when the previous owner of the Hanakago stock, former yokozuna Wajima, resigned from the Sumo Association. He recruited the Mongolian wrestler Kōryū in 2000, and he became the stable's first sekitori after the November 2006 tournament, and reached the top division in July 2008. However, he was forced to retire in April 2011 after being found guilty of match-fixing. Another Mongolian, Arawashi, was inherited from Araiso stable and reached juryo in July 2011. Hanakago closed down the stable after the May 2012 tournament because of financial problems, and he moved with his wrestlers and staff to Minezaki stable. When that stable closed in March 2021 he moved to Takadagawa stable.

In anticipation of his sixty-fifth birthday in April, he decided to retire definitively on 21 March 2024.

== Fighting style ==
Daijuyama's favoured kimarite or techniques were migi-yotsu (a left arm outside, right hand inside grip on his opponent's mawashi), uwatenage (overarm throw) and utchari (ring edge throw). His most common winning move by far was yori-kiri (force out), which accounted for nearly half his victories.

== Personal life ==
He is married, with three daughters.

== Career record ==
Daijuyama Tadaaki
Year	January Hatsu basho, Tokyo	March Haru basho, Osaka	May Natsu basho, Tokyo	July Nagoya basho, Nagoya	September Aki basho, Tokyo	November Kyūshū basho, Fukuoka
1975	x	(Maezumo)	West Jonokuchi #10; 5–2	West Jonidan #65; 4–3	East Jonidan #49; 4–3	East Jonidan #31; 4–3
1976	West Jonidan #14; 2–5	West Jonidan #35; 4–3	West Jonidan #9; 4–3	West Sandanme #84; 2–5	West Jonidan #20; 4–3	East Jonidan #3; 4–3
1977	West Sandanme #71; 5–2	East Sandanme #36; 5–2	West Sandanme #3; 2–5	West Sandanme #25; 4–3	West Sandanme #13; 3–4	West Sandanme #23; 5–2
1978	West Makushita #60; 4–3	East Makushita #47; 3–4	East Makushita #58; 3–4	East Sandanme #8; 6–1	East Makushita #37; 3–4	West Makushita #47; 5–2
1979	East Makushita #28; 2–5	West Makushita #48; 6–1	East Makushita #21; 4–3	East Makushita #15; 5–2	West Makushita #6; 4–3	West Makushita #4; 5–2
1980	West Jūryō #11; 9–6	East Jūryō #8; 9–6	West Jūryō #3; 8–7	East Jūryō #1; 9–6	East Maegashira #13; 8–7	West Maegashira #6; 4–11
1981	East Jūryō #1; 8–7	West Maegashira #13; 10–5	East Maegashira #6; 8–7	West Maegashira #3; 8–7	West Maegashira #1; 10–5; F★	West Sekiwake #1; 5–10
1982	West Maegashira #3; 6–9	West Maegashira #5; 9–6	East Maegashira #1; 5–10 ★	East Maegashira #8; 11–4	East Maegashira #1; 10–5; O★★	West Sekiwake #1; 4–11
1983	East Maegashira #5; 9–6	East Komusubi #1; 0–2–13	East Maegashira #9; Sat out due to injury 0–0–15	East Maegashira #9; 9–6	East Maegashira #3; 4–11	West Maegashira #10; 10–5
1984	West Maegashira #1; 6–9 ★	East Maegashira #3; 4–11 ★	West Maegashira #10; 9–6	East Maegashira #4; 9–6 ★	Maegashira #1; 4–11	East Maegashira #9; 8–7
1985	East Maegashira #5; 6–9	East Maegashira #9; 8–7	West Maegashira #5; 6–9	East Maegashira #9; 8–7	West Maegashira #3; 5–10	West Maegashira #11; 8–7
1986	West Maegashira #6; 8–7	West Maegashira #2; 5–10	West Maegashira #7; 9–6	East Maegashira #2; 5–10	West Maegashira #7; 8–7	East Maegashira #2; 5–10
1987	East Maegashira #8; 8–7	West Maegashira #2; 5–10	West Maegashira #6; 8–7	East Maegashira #1; 4–11	West Maegashira #7; 8–7	West Maegashira #1; 3–12
1988	East Maegashira #13; 10–5	East Maegashira #5; 9–6	West Komusubi #1; 8–7; F	West Komusubi #1; 3–12	East Maegashira #7; 10–5	East Maegashira #2; 9–6
1989	West Sekiwake #1; 4–11	West Maegashira #4; 8–7	East Maegashira #1; 4–11	West Maegashira #8; 11–4; F	West Komusubi #1; 5–10	East Maegashira #4; 6–9
1990	West Maegashira #7; 8–7	East Maegashira #4; 4–11	West Maegashira #9; 9–6	East Maegashira #4; 5–10	West Maegashira #11; 8–7	East Maegashira #7; 6–9
1991	West Maegashira #11; 8–7	East Maegashira #8; 6–9	West Maegashira #14; Retired; 3–12	x	x	x
Record given as wins–losses–absences Top division champion Top division runner-up Retired Lower divisions Non-participation Sanshō key: F=Fighting spirit; O=Outstanding performance; T=Technique Also shown: ★=Kinboshi; P=Playoff(s); Divisions: Makuuchi — Jūryō — Makushita — Sandanme — Jonidan — Jonokuchi Makuuchi ranks: Yokozuna — Ōzeki — Sekiwake — Komusubi — Maegashira

== See also ==
- List of sumo tournament top division runners-up
- Glossary of sumo terms
- List of past sumo wrestlers
- List of sumo elders
- List of sekiwake
