= Tamarikidō Hideki =

Zainichi Korean sumo (born 1974)

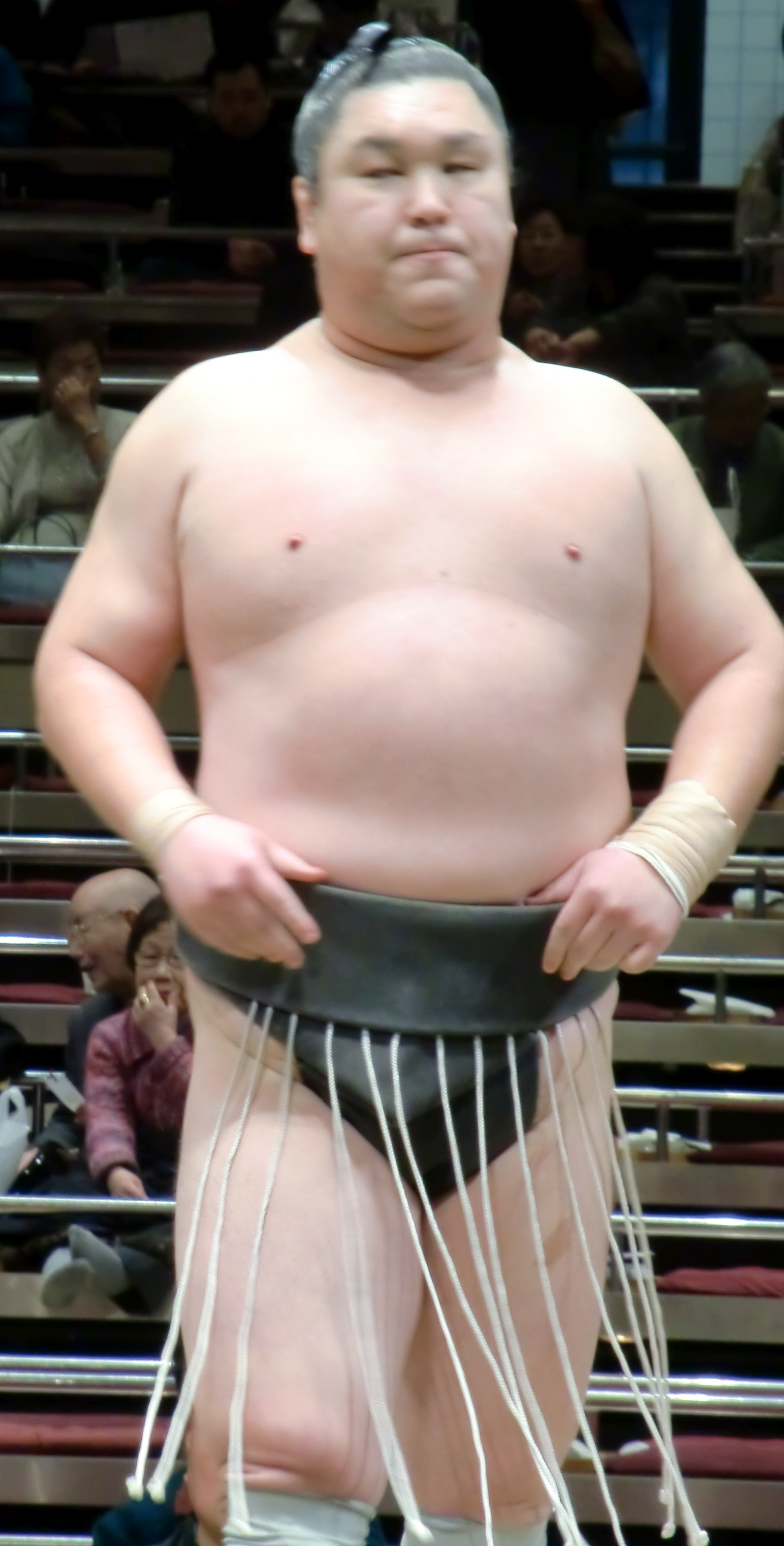
- Tamarikidō appearing for the last bout of his career in January 2010

Personal information
- Native name: 玉力道 栄来
- Born: Hideki Yasumoto; April 19, 1974 (age 52) Tokyo, Japan
- Height: 1.85 m (6 ft 1 in)
- Weight: 138 kg (304 lb)

Sport
- Sport: Sumo
- Retired: January 2010
- Heya: Kataonami
- Record: 375-354-120
- Debut: March, 1997
- Highest rank: Maegashira 8 (May, 2003)
- Elder name: Matsugane
- Championships: 1 (Jūryō); 1 (Sandanme)
- Updated on January 2010

Tamarikidō Hideki (born April 19, 1974) is a former sumo wrestler born in Edogawa, Tokyo, Japan. Though born in Japan, he is a Zainichi Korean and a member of Mindan. His highest rank was maegashira 8. A former amateur champion, he turned professional in 1997, reaching the top makuuchi division in 2001. He had many injury problems throughout his career, missing over 100 matches, and last fought in makuuchi in 2003. He announced his retirement in January 2010.

== Career ==
He was born in Edogawa, Tokyo, and is a third generation Korean-Japanese. He was a teammate of Takanohana at the Meidai Nakano High School's sumo club. He was also a former amateur sumo champion at Meiji University, and was considered extremely promising. He came third in the All Japan Sumo Championships. He made his professional debut in March 1997 at the bottom of the third makushita division, nearly winning the championship, losing the final bout in an eight-way playoff. The next two years however would not be without setbacks before he finally reached the second highest jūryō division in September 1999.

Tamarikidō made his debut in the top makuuchi division in January 2001. He has spent eleven tournaments in the top division in total, the last in November 2003 when he had to withdraw after winning only two bouts. 2004 was a disastrous year for him as a knee injury in May meant he missed nearly all his matches and fell to the fourth sandanme division. It was subsequently discovered that due to the lack of treatment of earlier injuries, his anterior cruciate ligament was completely worn away. He began his comeback in 2005, winning the sandanme division championship in March of that year.

He eventually managed to return to the jūryō division in March 2006, and having fallen to sandanme 80, he was the lowest ranking former top division wrestler ever to regain sekitori status. He had climbed as high as jūryō 4 by the November 2006 tournament. However, he was demoted back to the unsalaried ranks after the September 2007 tournament when he managed only a 3–12 score at jūryō 12. He continued to slide down the rankings, with four consecutive make-koshi scores of 3–4 from November 2007 to May 2008. After recording only one win in November 2008 he was demoted back to the sandanme division for the January 2009 tournament. He made an immediate return to the third division with a 6–1 score.

== Retirement from sumo ==
Tamarikidō retired after the January 2010 tournament, with a final day defeat to Kitazakura leaving him with a 1–6 record. His danpatsu-shiki, or retirement ceremony, was held in June at the Ryōgoku Kokugikan. He stayed in sumo as a coach at Kataonami stable under the toshiyori name Araiso Oyakata. In June 2013 he switched to the Nishonoseki name after it was vacated by the retiring stablemaster Kongō. In 2014 he swapped elder names with Matsugane Oyakata, the former ōzeki Wakashimazu, and joined the renamed Nishonoseki stable.

In August 2020 it was announced that he had tested positive for COVID-19, although he had not been displaying symptoms and was not believed to have been in close contact with other sumo personnel during the most recent tournament.

== Fighting style ==
Tamarikidō preferred to fight on the opponent's mawashi, and his favoured grip was (somewhat unusually) morozashi, or double hand inside. His most common winning kimarite was yori-kiri, a straightforward force out.

== Career record ==
Tamarikidō Hideki
Year	January Hatsu basho, Tokyo	March Haru basho, Osaka	May Natsu basho, Tokyo	July Nagoya basho, Nagoya	September Aki basho, Tokyo	November Kyūshū basho, Fukuoka
1997	x	Makushita tsukedashi #60; 6–1–PPP	East Makushita #31; 0–1–6	East Sandanme #6; 5–2	West Makushita #45; 6–1	East Makushita #21; 6–1
1998	East Makushita #8; 3–4	West Makushita #14; 4–3	West Makushita #11; 3–4	East Makushita #18; 5–2	West Makushita #10; 5–2	West Makushita #4; 2–5
1999	East Makushita #17; 4–3	East Makushita #13; 4–3	East Makushita #10; 5–2	West Makushita #3; 5–2	West Jūryō #12; 7–8	East Jūryō #13; 6–9
2000	West Makushita #1; 6–1	East Jūryō #10; 9–6	West Jūryō #4; Sat out due to injury 0–0–15	West Jūryō #4; 9–6	East Jūryō #3; 7–8	West Jūryō #5; 10–5
2001	West Maegashira #13; 6–9	East Jūryō #10; 9–6	West Jūryō #4; Sat out due to injury 0–0–15	East Jūryō #13; 9–6–PP	East Jūryō #9; 12–3–P	East Maegashira #15; 8–7
2002	West Maegashira #10; 4–11	East Maegashira #15; 4–11	East Jūryō #5; 8–5–2	West Jūryō #4; Sat out due to injury 0–0–15	West Jūryō #4; 11–4–PP; Champion	East Maegashira #13; 6–9
2003	East Maegashira #15; 8–7	West Maegashira #11; 8–7	East Maegashira #8; 7–8	West Maegashira #8; 6–9	West Maegashira #11; 6–9	East Maegashira #15; 2–6–7
2004	West Jūryō #7; Sat out due to injury 0–0–15	West Jūryō #7; 7–8	East Jūryō #8; 1–3–11	East Makushita #5; 0–4–3	West Makushita #40; Sat out due to injury 0–0–7	West Sandanme #20; Sat out due to injury 0–0–7
2005	West Sandanme #80; 6–1	West Sandanme #22; 7–0–P; Champion	West Makushita #15; 3–4	East Makushita #21; 3–4	East Makushita #30; 6–1	East Makushita #12; 5–2
2006	East Makushita #5; 4–3	West Jūryō #14; 9–6	East Jūryō #11; 7–8	West Jūryō #11; 8–7	West Jūryō #7; 8–7	West Jūryō #4; 7–8
2007	East Jūryō #5; 4–11	West Jūryō #12; 8–7	East Jūryō #10; 8–7	East Jūryō #7; 5–7–3	East Jūryō #12; 3–12	East Makushita #6; 3–4
2008	West Makushita #10; 3–4	West Makushita #15; 3–4	West Makushita #20; 3–4	East Makushita #27; 5–2	East Makushita #18; 2–5	East Makushita #34; 1–6
2009	West Sandanme #4; 6–1	West Makushita #31; 4–3	East Makushita #25; 3–4	East Makushita #32; 3–4	West Makushita #39; 4–3	East Makushita #33; 4–1–2
2010	West Makushita #27; Retired; 1–6	x	x	x	x	x
Record given as wins–losses–absences Top division champion Top division runner-up Retired Lower divisions Non-participation Sanshō key: F=Fighting spirit; O=Outstanding performance; T=Technique Also shown: ★=Kinboshi; P=Playoff(s); Divisions: Makuuchi — Jūryō — Makushita — Sandanme — Jonidan — Jonokuchi Makuuchi ranks: Yokozuna — Ōzeki — Sekiwake — Komusubi — Maegashira

== See also ==
- Glossary of sumo terms
- List of sumo tournament second division champions
- List of past sumo wrestlers
- List of sumo elders
