= Misugiiso Takuya =

Former Japanese sumo wrestler

Personal information
- Native name: 三杉磯 拓也
- Born: Hidenori Kamisawa; 11 May 1956 (age 70) Hachinohe, Aomori, Japan
- Height: 1.87 m (6 ft 1 1/2 in)
- Weight: 117 kg (258 lb)

Sport
- Sport: Sumo
- Retired: September, 1986
- Heya: Hanakago → Hanaregoma
- Record: 545-567-5
- Debut: March, 1971
- Highest rank: Maegashira 2 (January, 1979)
- Elder name: Minezaki
- Championships: 1 (Jūryō)
- Gold Stars: 2 (Kitanoumi, Mienoumi)
- Updated on Sep. 2012

Misugiiso Takuya (born 11 May 1956 as Hidenori Kamisawa) is a former sumo wrestler from Hachinohe, Aomori, Japan. He made his professional debut in March 1971, and reached the top division in November 1977. His highest rank was maegashira 2. He was a member of Hanakago stable and served as sword-bearer to his stablemate Wajima during the yokozuna dohyo-iri. He retired in September 1986, and as of 2021 he is an elder in the Japan Sumo Association under the name Minezaki. He was the head coach of Minezaki stable which he founded in 1988 until its closure in 2021. He speaks English due to his frequent trips to Hawaii. He is married with one son. After reaching 65 years of age in May 2021 he was re-employed for a further five years as a consultant and is currently working at Shibatayama stable.

Nicknamed "Drone master", Misugiiso is known for his passion for drones piloting his own machines and having accumulated over 280 hours of flight handling. In December 2021, he was asked by the Japan Sumo Association to collaborate on an aerial photography project of the Ryōgoku Kokugikan.

== Career record ==
Misugiiso Takuya
Year	January Hatsu basho, Tokyo	March Haru basho, Osaka	May Natsu basho, Tokyo	July Nagoya basho, Nagoya	September Aki basho, Tokyo	November Kyūshū basho, Fukuoka
1971	x	(Maezumo)	East Jonokuchi #4; 5–2	East Jonidan #52; 6–1	West Sandanme #77; 2–5	West Jonidan #19; 2–2
1972	East Jonidan #5; 3–0	East Sandanme #50; 0–0	East Sandanme #50; 2–5	East Sandanme #66; 4–3	West Sandanme #55; 4–3	West Sandanme #47; 2–5
1973	East Sandanme #69; 6–1	East Sandanme #21; 4–3	West Sandanme #13; 4–3	East Sandanme #3; 3–4	East Sandanme #18; 4–3	East Sandanme #8; 2–5
1974	West Sandanme #32; 5–2	West Sandanme #10; 4–3	West Makushita #57; 5–2	West Makushita #36; 3–4	East Makushita #42; 5–2	West Makushita #24; 5–2
1975	West Makushita #12; 2–5	West Makushita #26; 3–4	East Makushita #34; 4–3	East Makushita #28; 5–2	West Makushita #16; 6–1	East Makushita #4; 2–5
1976	West Makushita #16; 5–2	West Makushita #8; 5–2	West Makushita #2; 2–5	West Makushita #13; 5–2	West Makushita #5; 5–2	West Jūryō #12; 9–6
1977	West Jūryō #5; 6–9	West Jūryō #8; 7–8	West Jūryō #9; 9–6	East Jūryō #5; 8–7	West Jūryō #1; 8–7	East Maegashira #12; 5–10
1978	East Jūryō #3; 7–8	West Jūryō #5; 9–6	East Jūryō #2; 11–4–P	West Maegashira #10; 7–8	East Maegashira #11; 9–6	East Maegashira #7; 8–7
1979	West Maegashira #2; 4–11	East Maegashira #10; 7–8	West Maegashira #11; 8–7	East Maegashira #9; 8–7	West Maegashira #3; 6–9 ★★	East Maegashira #5; 5–10
1980	East Maegashira #10; 8–7	East Maegashira #5; 4–11	West Maegashira #12; 7–8	West Maegashira #12; 9–6	East Maegashira #9; 6–9	East Maegashira #12; 4–6–5
1981	East Jūryō #6; 6–9	East Jūryō #10; 9–6	East Jūryō #4; 12–3; Champion	East Maegashira #11; 8–7	West Maegashira #5; 8–7	West Maegashira #3; 5–10
1982	East Maegashira #9; 9–6	West Maegashira #2; 6–9	West Maegashira #5; 5–10	West Maegashira #12; 8–7	East Maegashira #9; 9–6	East Maegashira #3; 4–11
1983	West Maegashira #8; 7–8	East Maegashira #9; 7–8	West Maegashira #10; 8–7	East Maegashira #4; 5–10	West Maegashira #10; 6–9	East Jūryō #2; 7–8
1984	East Jūryō #4; 4–11	East Jūryō #11; 9–6	West Jūryō #7; 8–7	West Jūryō #5; 5–10	West Jūryō #9; 9–6	West Jūryō #5; 5–10
1985	East Jūryō #11; 8–7	East Jūryō #6; 9–6	West Jūryō #4; 8–7	East Jūryō #3; 10–5–P	West Maegashira #13; 8–7	West Maegashira #10; 8–7
1986	West Maegashira #4; 5–10	East Maegashira #10; 7–8	West Maegashira #12; 5–10	West Jūryō #3; 4–11	West Jūryō #10; Retired; 1–14	x
Record given as wins–losses–absences Top division champion Top division runner-up Retired Lower divisions Non-participation Sanshō key: F=Fighting spirit; O=Outstanding performance; T=Technique Also shown: ★=Kinboshi; P=Playoff(s); Divisions: Makuuchi — Jūryō — Makushita — Sandanme — Jonidan — Jonokuchi Makuuchi ranks: Yokozuna — Ōzeki — Sekiwake — Komusubi — Maegashira

== See also ==
- Glossary of sumo terms
- List of past sumo wrestlers
- List of sumo elders
- List of sumo tournament second division champions
