= Arawashi Tsuyoshi =

Sumo wrestler

Arawashi Tsuyoshi 荒鷲 毅
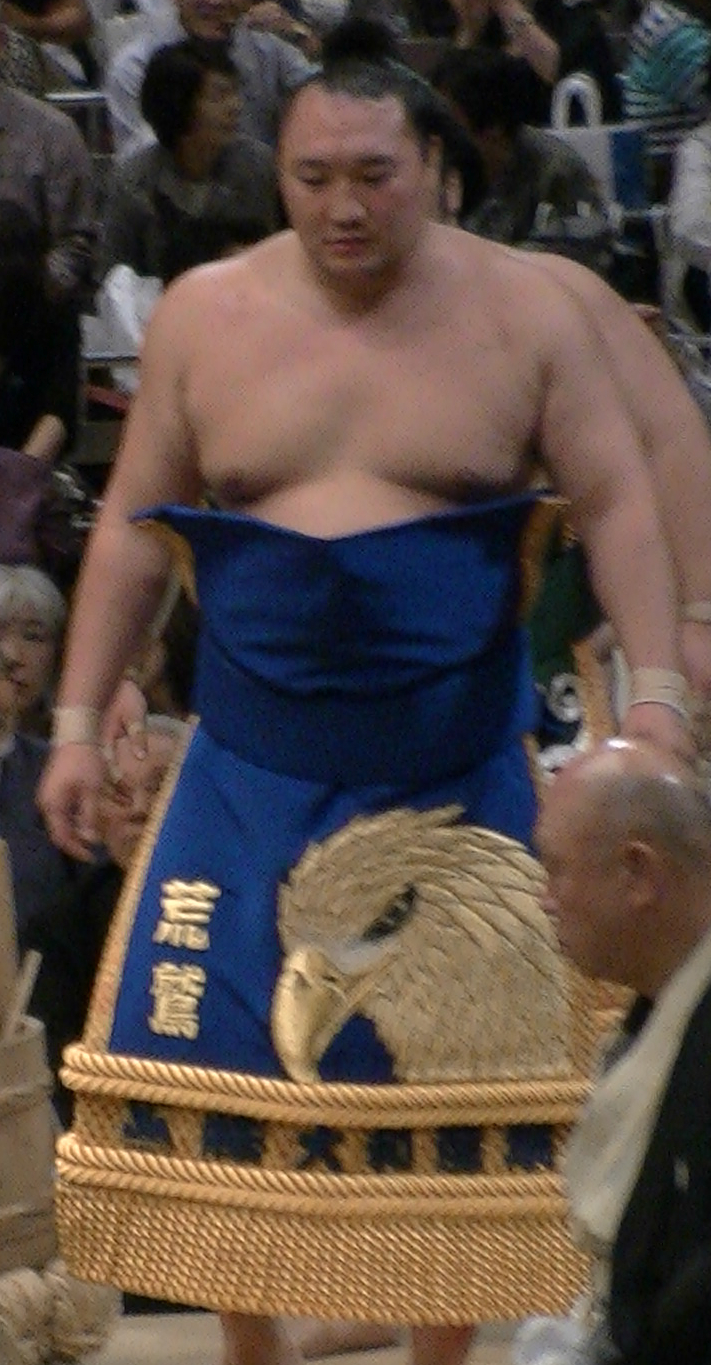
- Tsuyoshi in 2014

Personal information
- Born: Dulguun Erkhbayar; August 21, 1986 (age 40) Ulan Bator, Mongolia
- Height: 1.85 m (6 ft 1 in)
- Weight: 140 kg (310 lb; 22 st)

Sport
- Sport: Sumo
- Retired: January, 2020
- Heya: Araiso → Hanakago → Minezaki
- Record: 493-461-56
- Debut: November, 2002
- Highest rank: Maegashira 2 (January, 2017)
- Gold Stars: 3 Kakuryū; Hakuhō; Harumafuji
- Updated on Jan 24, 2020

Arawashi Tsuyoshi (荒鷲 毅; born 21 August 1986 as Dulguun Erkhbayar) is a former professional sumo wrestler from Ulan Bator, Mongolia. He made his professional debut in November 2002. He is the 21st Mongolian to reach the top makuuchi division, which he achieved in May 2014. His 68-tournament rise through the ranks is the second-slowest progress for a foreign wrestler after Sentōryū. He won three kinboshi or gold stars for defeating yokozuna. He was a member of three stables, Araiso, Hanakago and Minezaki. His highest rank was maegashira 2.

== Early life and sumo background ==
In his childhood he was active in sports such as basketball and swimming. He also lived in Indonesia for a time in his younger years. At the 2002 junior sumo tournament, he impressed then active Kyokushūzan with his ability and soon afterward he entered Araiso stable. He debuted in November of that same year in maezumō at the height of 183 centimeters (6 ft 0 in) and weighing 83 kilograms (183 lb).

== Career ==
=== Early career ===
From his November 2002 debut, he rose slowly but steadily through the ranks over three years, recording mostly winning tournaments. However, in the January 2006 tournament he dislocated his left shoulder and had to drop out. He also missed the following tournament. After this his shoulder became prone to dislocating and upon his seventh dislocation he elected to finally have corrective surgery upon completing the May 2007 tournament. Rehabilitation from the surgery forced him to sit out three tournaments. He dropped from makushita 22 down to jonidan 22 in this period. During this time he studied the techniques of former yokozuna Chiyonofuji who long suffered from an easily dislocated shoulder. Upon his return in January 2008, his sumo was back in form and he recorded three 6–1 consecutive tournaments. However, in September of that year, Araiso stable closed upon the retirement of its owner, the former Futagodake. While the other wrestlers in the stable chose to retire, he chose to remain active and transferred to Hanakago stable.

He continued his steady rise through the ranks, recording only one or two losing tournaments a year. In the May 2011 technical tournament which was not televised due to the ramifications of widespread match-fixing he managed only a 3–4 record at makushita 3. This normally would have led to a drop in rank. However, he was one of a number of wrestlers who benefited from the dismissal of several high-ranking wrestlers for match-fixing and he was actually promoted to the salaried jūryō division for the first time in his career in the July 2011 tournament. He only managed a 5–10 record at jūryō 13 and was demoted back to makushita 3. He repeated this same feat twice more, taking a number of tournaments to rise to jūryō and being relegated after a single losing tournament back to the unsalaried makushita division.

During this period, in 2012, Hanakago stable had to close due to financial difficulties. He then transferred to his third stable, Minezaki. Starting in the September 2013 tournament he begin to be more consistent, and posted two strong 6–1 consecutive tournaments to achieve promotion to jūryō for the fourth time in the January 2014 tournament. He debuted at a then career high rank of jūryō 10 and managed an 8–7 record. A 10–5 record in the following March tournament garnered him his first promotion to the makuuchi top division for the May 2014 tournament.

=== Makuuchi career ===
Arawashi was the 21st Mongolian to make it to the top division following Terunofuji. At the beginning of his career, Arawashi had entered sumo at the same time as Kotoōshū but was soon left behind as Kotoōshū made one of the fastest-ever rises to makuuchi and ultimately ōzeki. Arawashi had stated that one of his goals was to make it to makuuchi and once again face Kotoōshū in the ring. However, he would never realize this goal, as Kotoōshū retired, his name being taken off the banzuke the same tournament that Arawashi's was added to makuuchi. Arawashi alternated between winning and losing tournaments before a calamitous 2–13 record in May 2015 saw him demoted back to the jūryō division. He returned to the top division in July 2016 and came through with a winning record. In November 2016 he produced a career-best performance as a final day win over Shōdai saw him end with an 11–4 record and a promotion to maegashira 2 for the January tournament. In this tournament he started with five straight losses but then defeated yokozuna Kakuryū on Day 6 to earn his first kinboshi. It took him 85 tournaments from his professional debut to get a kinboshi, the seventh-slowest of all time. He then defeated Hakuhō on Day 8, meaning his only two wins of the tournament at that point had come against yokozuna. He finished with a 6–9 record. In the March 2017 tournament he had his third career win over a yokozuna, defeating Harumafuji. However, he had to withdraw from the tournament on Day 13 after injuring his ankle. He returned to the maegashira 2 ranking in March 2018, but scored only 2–13. After a run of poor results he was demoted to the jūryō division after the July 2018 tournament. He returned to the top division in November 2018 but after winning only one match he withdrew on Day 13 with a left knee injury, sending him back to jūryō.

== Retirement from sumo ==
He was demoted to the makushita division after the July 2019 tournament, and withdrew on Day 13 in September. He remained in Tokyo for treatment on his knee, missing the Kyushu tournament in November. He fell to makushita 48 in January 2020 and sat out that tournament too, announcing his retirement on Day 13. At his press conference he said he had continuing pain in his knee, and that his fondest career memory was his Day 14 win over Tamaasuka in January 2014, which clinched his first kachi-koshi as a sekitori. His danpatsu-shiki or official retirement ceremony was scheduled to be held on May 31, 2020 but was postponed because of the COVID-19 pandemic. It took place on February 23, 2021, with Kakuryū and Harumafuji among the 335 guests. It was the first retirement ceremony held at the Ryōgoku Kokugikan since Oshiogawa (former sekiwake Takekaze) a year previously. Arawashi does not hold elder stock in the Sumo Association but is working as a coach in an unofficial capacity at Minezaki stable while deciding on his future plans. The Minezaki stable closed after the March 2021 tournament but he intends to remain in Japan.

== Personal life ==
Arawashi was married in January 2017 to a 27-year-old flight attendant who he had first met in Mongolia two years previously. After pulling out of the March 2017 tournament through injury, he was allowed to make the marriage public only after successfully completing the May tournament.

== Fighting style ==
According to his Japan Sumo Association profile, Arawashi's favourite grips and techniques are migi-yotsu (a left hand outside, right hand inside hold on the opponent's mawashi), yori kiri (force out) and uwatenage (overarm throw). He was the lightest man in the top division until the promotion of Ishiura in November 2016.

== Career record ==
Arawashi Tsuyoshi
Year	January Hatsu basho, Tokyo	March Haru basho, Osaka	May Natsu basho, Tokyo	July Nagoya basho, Nagoya	September Aki basho, Tokyo	November Kyūshū basho, Fukuoka
2002	x	x	x	x	x	(Maezumo)
2003	East Jonokuchi #32; 4–3	East Jonidan #91; 6–1	East Jonidan #15; 4–3	West Sandanme #97; 4–3	East Sandanme #78; 5–2	West Sandanme #47; 3–4
2004	East Sandanme #60; 4–3	East Sandanme #48; 5–2	East Sandanme #20; 5–2	West Makushita #57; 3–4	West Sandanme #10; 5–2	West Makushita #53; 3–4
2005	West Sandanme #5; 4–3	East Makushita #56; 4–3	West Makushita #47; 2–5	West Sandanme #9; 6–1	East Makushita #34; 4–3	West Makushita #29; 4–3
2006	West Makushita #20; 1–1–5	West Makushita #44; Sat out due to injury 0–0–7	West Sandanme #24; 5–2	East Makushita #59; 2–2–3	West Sandanme #24; 2–5	East Sandanme #49; 5–2
2007	East Sandanme #21; 6–1	East Makushita #42; 5–2	West Makushita #30; 4–2–1	West Makushita #22; Sat out due to injury 0–0–7	West Sandanme #2; Sat out due to injury 0–0–7	East Sandanme #62; Sat out due to injury 0–0–7
2008	West Jonidan #22; 6–1	West Sandanme #56; 6–1	West Sandanme #4; 6–1	West Makushita #30; 4–3	West Makushita #25; 2–5	West Makushita #41; 4–3
2009	East Makushita #35; 2–5	West Makushita #52; 4–3	West Makushita #43; 4–3	East Makushita #36; 5–2	West Makushita #25; 5–2	West Makushita #16; 3–4
2010	East Makushita #23; 5–2	East Makushita #17; 5–2	East Makushita #10; 3–4	West Makushita #19; 4–3	West Makushita #12; 4–3	East Makushita #9; 4–3
2011	East Makushita #6; 4–3	Tournament Cancelled; 0–0–0	East Makushita #3; 3–4	West Jūryō #13; 5–10	West Makushita #3; 3–4	East Makushita #6; 5–2
2012	East Makushita #2; 4–3	West Jūryō #14; 7–8	East Makushita #1; 3–4	East Makushita #4; 4–3	East Jūryō #14; 5–10	West Makushita #2; 3–4
2013	West Makushita #5; 4–3	East Makushita #2; 3–4	West Makushita #4; 3–4	East Makushita #11; 4–3	East Makushita #10; 6–1	West Makushita #1; 6–1
2014	West Jūryō #10; 8–7	East Jūryō #8; 10–5	East Maegashira #16; 7–8	East Maegashira #17; 10–5	West Maegashira #8; 5–10	West Maegashira #13; 8–7
2015	West Maegashira #12; 7–8	West Maegashira #14; 8–7	East Maegashira #12; 2–13	East Jūryō #7; 9–6	West Jūryō #3; 7–8	East Jūryō #5; 8–7
2016	East Jūryō #4; 7–8	East Jūryō #5; 8–7	West Jūryō #3; 8–7	East Maegashira #16; 9–6	East Maegashira #10; 7–8	West Maegashira #10; 11–4
2017	West Maegashira #2; 6–9 ★★	West Maegashira #4; 3–10–2 ★	East Maegashira #11; 7–8	East Maegashira #12; 8–7	West Maegashira #9; 9–6	West Maegashira #5; 8–7
2018	West Maegashira #4; 8–7	East Maegashira #2; 2–13	East Maegashira #12; 7–8	West Maegashira #12; 5–10	East Jūryō #1; 8–7	East Maegashira #16; 1–12–2
2019	East Jūryō #10; 6–9	West Jūryō #12; 8–7	East Jūryō #12; 8–7	West Jūryō #10; 5–10	West Makushita #1; 2–4–1	East Makushita #8; Sat out due to injury 0–0–7
2020	West Makushita #48; Retired; 0–0–7	x	x	x	x	x
Record given as wins–losses–absences Top division champion Top division runner-up Retired Lower divisions Non-participation Sanshō key: F=Fighting spirit; O=Outstanding performance; T=Technique Also shown: ★=Kinboshi; P=Playoff(s); Divisions: Makuuchi — Jūryō — Makushita — Sandanme — Jonidan — Jonokuchi Makuuchi ranks: Yokozuna — Ōzeki — Sekiwake — Komusubi — Maegashira

== See also ==
- Glossary of sumo terms
- List of past sumo wrestlers
- List of Mongolian sumo wrestlers
- List of non-Japanese sumo wrestlers
