= Kōryū Tadaharu =

Mongolian sumo wrestler

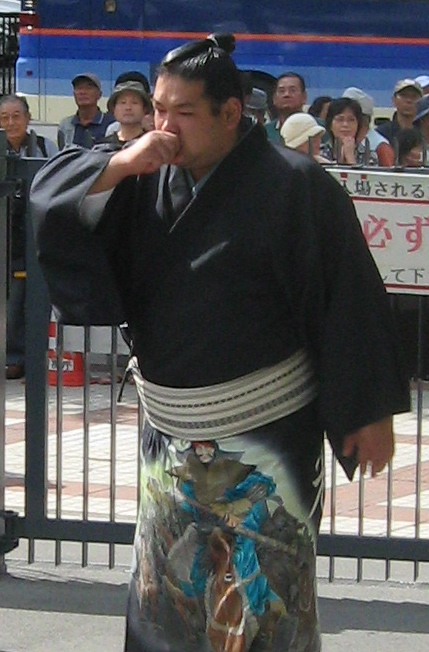
- Tadaharu in 2008

Personal information
- Native name: 光龍 忠晴
- Born: Munkh-Orgil Erdenesukh; February 4, 1984 (age 42) Ulan Bator, Mongolia
- Height: 1.85 m (6 ft 1 in)
- Weight: 152 kg (335 lb; 23.9 st)

Sport
- Sport: Sumo
- Retired: April, 2011
- Heya: Hanakago
- Record: 331-292-4
- Debut: November, 2000
- Highest rank: Maegashira #11 (November 2008)
- Updated on Mar 2026

Kōryū Tadaharu (光龍 忠晴, born 4 February 1984) is a Mongolian former sumo wrestler from Ulan Bator. His highest rank was maegashira 11. He was forced to retire from sumo in 2011 after being found guilty of match-fixing.

== Early life and sumo background ==
Munkh-Orgil's father was a motocross rider, and he followed in his footsteps by participating in the sport from ages 10–16. He was also active in basketball and his team won the national high school first and second years' championship. Later, the Hakkaku stable coach, former yokozuna Hokutoumi came to Mongolia looking for new wrestlers. A competition was held and Munkh-Orgil did sufficiently well, along with two other tryouts, later wrestlers Hoshihikari and Hoshizakura to gain acceptance into the stable. However, at the time, each stable was limited to two foreign wrestlers each, so the other two went to Hakkaku stable and Munkh-Orgil was allowed to enter another stable, Hanakago. He came to Japan to join this stable and entered professional sumo in November 2000. The first character of his shikona or ring name was at the behest of his coach, who on his first visit to Mongolia, found the sun of the high plains of Mongolia bright and glorious.

== Career ==
He did not manage to achieve sekitori promotion to jūryō until January 2007. He was the first member of his stable to reach sumo's second highest division since it was re-established by the former sekiwake Daijuyama in 1992. After about a year and a half in jūryō, he gained promotion to makuuchi, but was demoted the next tournament after winning only three bouts. A convincing 10–5 record at jūryō #5 in the next tournament put him right back in the top division, where he would last two tournaments.

After about a year in jūryō, his reappearance in makuuchi in January 2010 following another 10-5 performance was his third promotion to the top division. However, a poor 3–12 record saw him demoted to jūryō once again for March. He returned to makuuchi after an 11–4 record which included a playoff for the jūryō championship, but his fifth attempt at a winning score in the top division in the May tournament proved unsuccessful. Nevertheless, he was back in makuuchi once again in September 2010. In the following November tournament he finally managed a winning record in his sixth tournament in the top division.

== Retirement from sumo ==
Koryu was one of 23 wrestlers found guilty of fixing the result of bouts after an investigation by the Japan Sumo Association, and he was forced to retire in April 2011.

== Fighting style ==
Koryu was an oshi-sumo specialist, preferring pushing and thrusting techniques. The Sumo Association lists tsuppari, a series of rapid thrusts to the chest, as his favourite. His most common winning kimarite was oshidashi, or push out.

== Family ==
Kōryū was married in 2010, with the reception taking place in January 2011. The couple have a daughter, born in April 2010. And the family had son born in 2013 march.

His mother's brother in law is the uncle of fellow Mongolian wrestler Shōtenrō.

== Career record ==
Kōryū Tadaharu
Year	January Hatsu basho, Tokyo	March Haru basho, Osaka	May Natsu basho, Tokyo	July Nagoya basho, Nagoya	September Aki basho, Tokyo	November Kyūshū basho, Fukuoka
2000	x	x	x	x	x	(Maezumo)
2001	East Jonokuchi #35; 4–3	East Jonidan #122; 5–2	West Jonidan #78; 4–3	East Jonidan #50; 4–3	East Jonidan #28; 3–4	East Jonidan #49; 6–1
2002	West Sandanme #83; 4–3	West Sandanme #66; 3–4	East Sandanme #85; 5–2	West Sandanme #48; 4–3	East Sandanme #36; 3–4	West Sandanme #54; 5–2
2003	East Sandanme #28; 3–4	East Sandanme #45; 5–2	West Sandanme #19; 3–4	East Sandanme #31; 5–2	West Sandanme #5; 5–2	West Makushita #45; 6–1
2004	East Makushita #16; 3–4	East Makushita #24; 3–4	East Makushita #35; 4–3	West Makushita #30; 4–3	West Makushita #24; 6–1	West Makushita #9; 3–4
2005	West Makushita #14; 5–2	West Makushita #7; 4–3	East Makushita #5; 0–3–4	West Makushita #40; 5–2	West Makushita #26; 6–1	East Makushita #9; 3–4
2006	East Makushita #12; 5–2	West Makushita #4; 3–4	East Makushita #9; 5–2	East Makushita #4; 3–4	West Makushita #7; 5–2	East Makushita #3; 4–3
2007	West Jūryō #13; 8–7	East Jūryō #11; 8–7	West Jūryō #8; 6–9	East Jūryō #12; 9–6	East Jūryō #6; 7–8	East Jūryō #8; 10–5
2008	West Jūryō #1; 7–8	West Jūryō #2; 5–10	West Jūryō #7; 12–3	West Maegashira #13; 3–12	East Jūryō #5; 10–5	West Maegashira #11; 6–9
2009	West Maegashira #13; 5–10	West Jūryō #2; 6–9	East Jūryō #6; 8–7	East Jūryō #2; 6–9	West Jūryō #5; 7–8	East Jūryō #6; 10–5–P
2010	East Maegashira #16; 3–12	West Jūryō #6; 11–4–P	East Maegashira #16; 5–10	East Jūryō #4; 9–6	East Maegashira #12; 6–9	East Maegashira #15; 8–7
2011	East Maegashira #12; 8–7	Tournament Cancelled; 0–0–0	East Maegashira #11; Retired –	x	x	x
Record given as wins–losses–absences Top division champion Top division runner-up Retired Lower divisions Non-participation Sanshō key: F=Fighting spirit; O=Outstanding performance; T=Technique Also shown: ★=Kinboshi; P=Playoff(s); Divisions: Makuuchi — Jūryō — Makushita — Sandanme — Jonidan — Jonokuchi Makuuchi ranks: Yokozuna — Ōzeki — Sekiwake — Komusubi — Maegashira

== See also ==
- Glossary of sumo terms
- List of past sumo wrestlers
- List of Mongolian sumo wrestlers
- List of non-Japanese sumo wrestlers
