= Wakashimazu Mutsuo =

Japanese sumo wrestler (1957–2026)

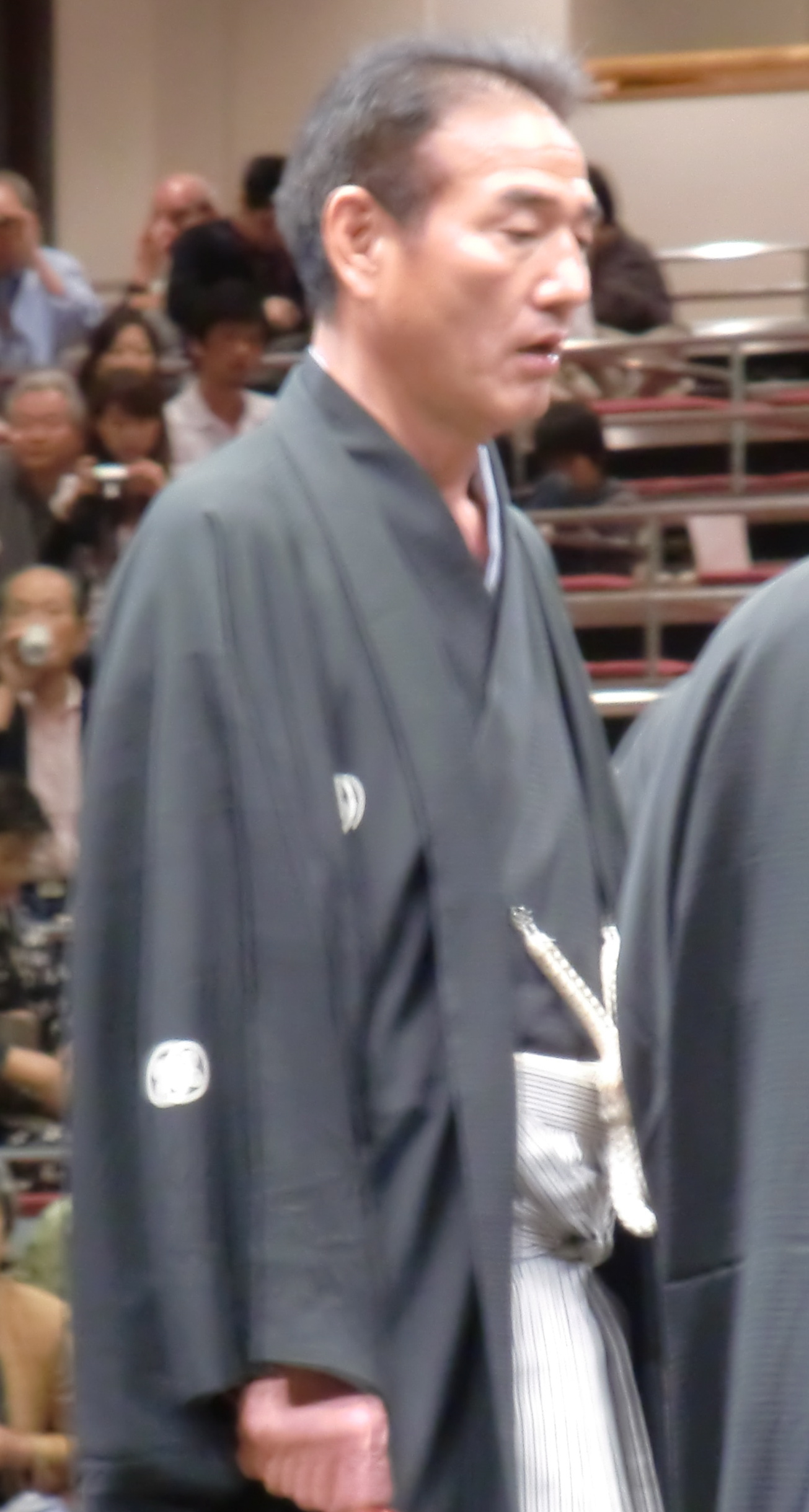
- Mutsuo in 2010

Personal information
- Native name: 若嶋津 六夫
- Born: Mutsuo Hidaka; 12 January 1957 Nakatane, Kagoshima, Japan
- Died: 15 March 2026 (aged 69)
- Height: 1.88 m (6 ft 2 in)
- Weight: 122 kg (269 lb)

Sport
- Sport: Sumo
- Retired: July, 1987
- Heya: Futagoyama stable, Takanohana stable
- Record: 515-330-21
- Debut: March, 1975
- Highest rank: Ōzeki (January, 1983)
- Elder name: Araiso
- Championships: 2 (Makuuchi); 1 (Jūryō); 1 (Jonokuchi)
- Special Prizes: Fighting Spirit (2); Technique (3)
- Gold Stars: 2 (Kitanoumi)
- Updated on August 2012

Wakashimazu Mutsuo (若嶋津 六夫) (born Mutsuo Hidaka; 12 January 1957 – 15 March 2026) was a Japanese sumo wrestler from Nakatane, Kagoshima. His highest rank was ōzeki. He won two top-division yūshō or tournament championships. Mutsuo retired in 1987 and founded Matsugane stable in 1990 (now known as Hanaregoma stable).

== Early life and career ==
Mutsuo came from a family of farmers. He was a classmate of Tsuyoshi Nagabuchi at junior high school. Wakashimazu wrestled for Futagoyama stable/Takanohana stable, joining in March 1975. Unlike most professional sumo wrestlers, he did not join from junior high school but instead joined after completing high school. He was a high school sumo champion but needed some persuasion from his stablemaster that he would be able to put on enough weight to succeed in professional sumo. He made his debut alongside future top division regulars Daijuyama and Kirishima. He reached the salaried sekitori ranks in March 1980 upon promotion to the jūryō division and reached the top makuuchi division in January 1981. He scored 10 wins in his makuuchi debut. He moved quickly through the division, winning five special prizes, two for Fighting Spirit and three for Technique. He reached sumo's second highest rank of ōzeki in January 1983 after two runner-up performances and 34 wins out of 45 in the three preceding tournaments. After a 10–5 in his ōzeki debut, he broke his leg in the following tournament, but made a remarkably quick recovery, with a 13–2 score and runner-up honours in the next tournament in May 1983.

He was popular with the crowds and his lean and swarthy appearance led to him being nicknamed the "Black Panther", His best year was in 1984, when he took two top division tournament championships in March and July, the second with a perfect 15–0 record, but he could manage only third place in the September 1984 tournament and missed out on promotion to the highest rank of yokozuna. Nevertheless he finished 1984 with 71 wins out of a possible 90, more than any other wrestler (the three yokozuna at the time, Kitanoumi, Chiyonofuji and Takanosato were all restricted by injury during the year). March 1985 saw his sixth and final runner-up performance. From November 1985, his results started to decline, and in an attempt to change his luck he switched from his trademark kelly green mawashi to a light blue one, but soon switched back when results did not improve. He retired in July 1987 at the age of thirty, leaving the Futagoyama stable without anyone in the san'yaku ranks for the first time in over fifteen years.

== Retirement from sumo ==
After his retirement Wakashimazu set up his own training stable, Matsugane, early in 1990. The retirement of Harunoyama in November 2006 left the stable with no wrestlers in the top two divisions. He finally produced another sekitori in March 2010 when Matsutani (now Shōhōzan) was promoted to jūryō. In 2014, he switched his toshiyori or elder name to a more prestigious one, Nishonoseki, and renamed his stable accordingly.

In September 2010, he was demoted in the Sumo Association's hierarchy after he accepted lodgings in Osaka for the Haru tournament the previous March from a company president connected to gangsters. In addition, two of his wrestlers, Matsutani and the sandanme ranked Wakarikido, were suspended for two tournaments for illegal betting on baseball. However, he joined the Board of Directors in 2014, and was re-elected in 2016. Also in 2016, he became head of the judging department.

In October 2017, he was injured in a fall from his bicycle in Funabashi, Chiba, and underwent emergency surgery for a cerebral contusion. He stepped down from his judging duties and did not run for re-election to the Sumo Association board in 2018.

In December 2021, as he was approaching the mandatory retirement age of 65, he stood down as head coach of his stable, which was transferred to one of his coaches, the former maegashira Tamanoshima, and renamed Hanaregoma stable. He swapped elder names with the former yokozuna Kisenosato, and became Araiso-oyakata. He was planning to stay with the Sumo Association for a further five years as a consultant, but in July 2023, it was announced that he was retiring definitively, as he wished to retire before his 70th birthday, transferring the Araiso name to former sekiwake Kotoyūki.

== Personal life and death ==
Mutsuo was married to former pop/enka singer Mizue Takada from 1985. Upon his promotion to the top division in 1981, he mentioned Takada in an interview as an ideal wife, four years before it happened.

Mutsuo died on 15 March 2026 of pneumonia, at the age of 69. His funeral was held on 24 March.

== Fighting style ==
Mutsuo's favourite kimarite or techniques were hidari-yotsu, a right hand outside and left hand inside grip on his opponent's mawashi, yori-kiri (force out), uwatenage (overarm throw) and tsuri-dashi (lift out).

== Career record ==
Wakashimazu Mutsuo
Year	January Hatsu basho, Tokyo	March Haru basho, Osaka	May Natsu basho, Tokyo	July Nagoya basho, Nagoya	September Aki basho, Tokyo	November Kyūshū basho, Fukuoka
1975	x	(Maezumo)	East Jonokuchi #7; 7–0; Champion	East Jonidan #12; 4–3	East Sandanme #74; 2–5	West Jonidan #18; 4–3
1976	East Jonidan #1; 5–2	West Sandanme #50; 4–3	East Sandanme #37; 2–5	East Sandanme #62; 2–5	West Sandanme #88; Sat out due to injury 0–0–7	East Jonidan #45; 7–0–P
1977	East Sandanme #46; 6–1	West Sandanme #1; 3–4	West Sandanme #11; 3–4	West Sandanme #22; 4–3	East Sandanme #9; 5–2	East Makushita #45; 4–3
1978	West Makushita #36; 5–2	East Makushita #18; 5–2	West Makushita #7; 2–5	East Makushita #25; 4–3	West Makushita #19; 3–4	West Makushita #28; 2–5
1979	West Makushita #50; 4–3	East Makushita #44; 5–2	West Makushita #26; 4–3	West Makushita #19; 3–4	East Makushita #28; 4–3	West Makushita #22; 6–1
1980	East Makushita #5; 6–1	West Jūryō #13; 9–6	West Jūryō #10; 10–5–PP; Champion	East Jūryō #4; 6–8–1	West Jūryō #8; 10–5	East Jūryō #2; 9–6
1981	East Maegashira #12; 10–5; F	East Maegashira #4; 4–11	West Maegashira #9; 8–7	East Maegashira #8; 8–7	East Maegashira #3; 7–8	West Maegashira #4; 8–7 ★
1982	West Maegashira #2; 12–3; T★	West Sekiwake #1; 8–7	West Sekiwake #1; 7–8	East Komusubi #1; 10–5	East Sekiwake #1; 12–3; TF	East Sekiwake #1; 12–3; T
1983	West Ōzeki #2; 10–5	East Ōzeki #2; 8–3–4	West Ōzeki #2; 13–2	West Ōzeki #1; 11–4	West Ōzeki #1; 13–2	East Ōzeki #1; 11–4
1984	East Ōzeki #1; 11–4	East Ōzeki #1; 14–1	East Ōzeki #1; 9–6	East Ōzeki #2; 15–0	East Ōzeki #1; 11–4	East Ōzeki #1; 11–4
1985	East Ōzeki #1; 9–6	West Ōzeki #1; 12–3	West Ōzeki #1; 10–5	West Ōzeki #1; 4–4–7	West Ōzeki #2; 9–6	West Ōzeki #2; 3–12
1986	East Ōzeki #3; 8–7	West Ōzeki #3; 7–8	West Ōzeki #3; 9–6	West Ōzeki #3; 9–6	West Ōzeki #2; 8–7	West Ōzeki #2; 8–7
1987	East Ōzeki #3; 5–10	East Ōzeki #3; 8–7	West Ōzeki #2; 4–9–2	West Ōzeki #2; Retired; 0–3	x	x
Record given as wins–losses–absences Top division champion Top division runner-up Retired Lower divisions Non-participation Sanshō key: F=Fighting spirit; O=Outstanding performance; T=Technique Also shown: ★=Kinboshi; P=Playoff(s); Divisions: Makuuchi — Jūryō — Makushita — Sandanme — Jonidan — Jonokuchi Makuuchi ranks: Yokozuna — Ōzeki — Sekiwake — Komusubi — Maegashira

== See also ==
- Glossary of sumo terms
- List of past sumo wrestlers
- List of sumo elders
- List of sumo tournament top division champions
- List of sumo tournament top division runners-up
- List of sumo tournament second division champions
- List of ōzeki
