= Futagodake Takeshi =

Sumo wrestler (1943–2026)

Personal information
- Native name: 二子岳 武
- Born: Takeshi Yamanaka; November 15, 1943 Kanagi, Aomori, Japan
- Died: September 10, 2026 (aged 82)
- Height: 1.78 m (5 ft 10 in)
- Weight: 106 kg (234 lb)

Sport
- Sport: Sumo
- Retired: September, 1976
- Heya: Hanakago → Futagoyama
- Record: 571-569-37-1(draw)
- Debut: January, 1961
- Highest rank: Komusubi (November, 1967)
- Elder name: Araiso
- Special Prizes: Technique (1)
- Gold Stars: 1 (Taihō)
- Updated on September 2026

Futagodake Takeshi (Japanese: 二子岳 武; born Takeshi Yamanaka (山中 武), November 15, 1943 – September 10, 2026) was a Japanese sumo wrestler from Kanagi, Aomori. He made his professional debut in January 1961, and reached the top division in January 1967. His highest rank was komusubi. He retired in September 1976 and became an elder in the Japan Sumo Association. In 1993 he branched out from Futagoyama stable and opened up Araiso stable. Araiso stable folded when Futagodake reached the mandatory retirement age of 65 in November 2008.

In September 1974, his 11th day match with yokozuna Mienoumi was declared a draw (hikiwake) after multiple water breaks (mizu-iri) and a rematch (torinaoshi) failed to yield any progress. This was the first draw to be called in makuuchi since September 1963, and to date stands as the last such occurrence.

Futagodake died from hepatocellular carcinoma on September 10, 2026, at the age of 82. The Japan Sumo Association announced his death on September 13.

== Career record ==
Futagodake Takeshi
Year	January Hatsu basho, Tokyo	March Haru basho, Osaka	May Natsu basho, Tokyo	July Nagoya basho, Nagoya	September Aki basho, Tokyo	November Kyūshū basho, Fukuoka
1961	(Maezumo)	West Jonokuchi #15; 6–1–P	East Jonidan #55; 5–2	East Jonidan #5; Sat out due to injury 0–0–7	West Jonidan #51; 6–1	West Sandanme #97; 5–2
1962	East Sandanme #56; 4–3	West Sandanme #40; 4–3	West Sandanme #31; 4–3	East Sandanme #24; 4–3	West Sandanme #15; 5–2	West Makushita #89; 5–2
1963	West Makushita #71; 4–3	West Makushita #66; 4–3	East Makushita #59; 4–3	West Makushita #52; 5–2	East Makushita #35; 4–3	East Makushita #28; 4–3
1964	East Makushita #23; 5–2	West Makushita #14; 4–3	West Makushita #12; 5–2	West Makushita #6; 5–2	West Makushita #1; 5–2	West Jūryō #17; 4–6–5
1965	West Makushita #6; Sat out due to injury 0–0–7	West Makushita #46; 4–3	East Makushita #42; 4–3	West Makushita #39; 6–1	East Makushita #19; 6–1	West Makushita #3; 6–1
1966	East Makushita #1; 5–2	East Jūryō #17; 10–5	West Jūryō #7; 9–6	East Jūryō #3; 5–10	East Jūryō #6; 10–5	West Jūryō #1; 10–5
1967	West Maegashira #13; 8–7	East Maegashira #12; 9–6	East Maegashira #7; 7–8	East Maegashira #7; 9–6	East Maegashira #1; 8–7	West Komusubi #1; 5–10
1968	West Maegashira #4; 8–7	West Komusubi #1; 8–7	West Komusubi #1; 0–5–10	East Maegashira #6; 8–7	East Maegashira #4; 6–9	West Maegashira #7; 10–5; T
1969	East Maegashira #2; 5–10	East Maegashira #6; 6–9	East Maegashira #9; 4–11	West Jūryō #3; 10–5	West Maegashira #9; 8–7	East Maegashira #4; 5–10 ★
1970	West Maegashira #8; 9–6	West Maegashira #2; 4–11	West Maegashira #9; 7–8	West Maegashira #10; 8–7	West Maegashira #4; 4–11	West Maegashira #9; 8–7
1971	West Maegashira #6; 9–6	East Maegashira #1; 2–13	West Maegashira #11; 8–7	West Maegashira #6; 8–7	East Maegashira #3; 3–12	West Maegashira #9; 8–7
1972	East Maegashira #4; 6–9	East Maegashira #8; 8–7	West Maegashira #2; 4–11	East Maegashira #9; 8–7	East Maegashira #6; 7–8	West Maegashira #8; 6–9
1973	East Maegashira #12; 9–6	West Maegashira #6; 8–7	West Maegashira #2; 5–10	West Maegashira #8; 8–7	East Maegashira #3; 3–12	East Maegashira #10; 5–10
1974	East Jūryō #2; 9–6	East Maegashira #12; 9–6	East Maegashira #5; 6–9	West Maegashira #9; 8–7	East Maegashira #6; 6–8–1draw	East Maegashira #11; 8–7
1975	West Maegashira #7; 8–7	East Maegashira #6; 5–10	West Maegashira #11; 9–6	East Maegashira #6; 6–9	West Maegashira #9; 8–7	West Maegashira #6; 5–10
1976	East Maegashira #12; 8–7	East Maegashira #11; 8–7	West Maegashira #8; 9–6	East Maegashira #4; 4–11	East Maegashira #12; Retired; 0–7–1	x
Record given as wins–losses–absences Top division champion Top division runner-up Retired Lower divisions Non-participation Sanshō key: F=Fighting spirit; O=Outstanding performance; T=Technique Also shown: ★=Kinboshi; P=Playoff(s); Divisions: Makuuchi — Jūryō — Makushita — Sandanme — Jonidan — Jonokuchi Makuuchi ranks: Yokozuna — Ōzeki — Sekiwake — Komusubi — Maegashira

== See also ==
- Glossary of sumo terms
- List of past sumo wrestlers
- List of komusubi
