= Shibatayama stable =

Organization of sumo wrestlers

Coordinates: 35.6825°N 139.6158°E

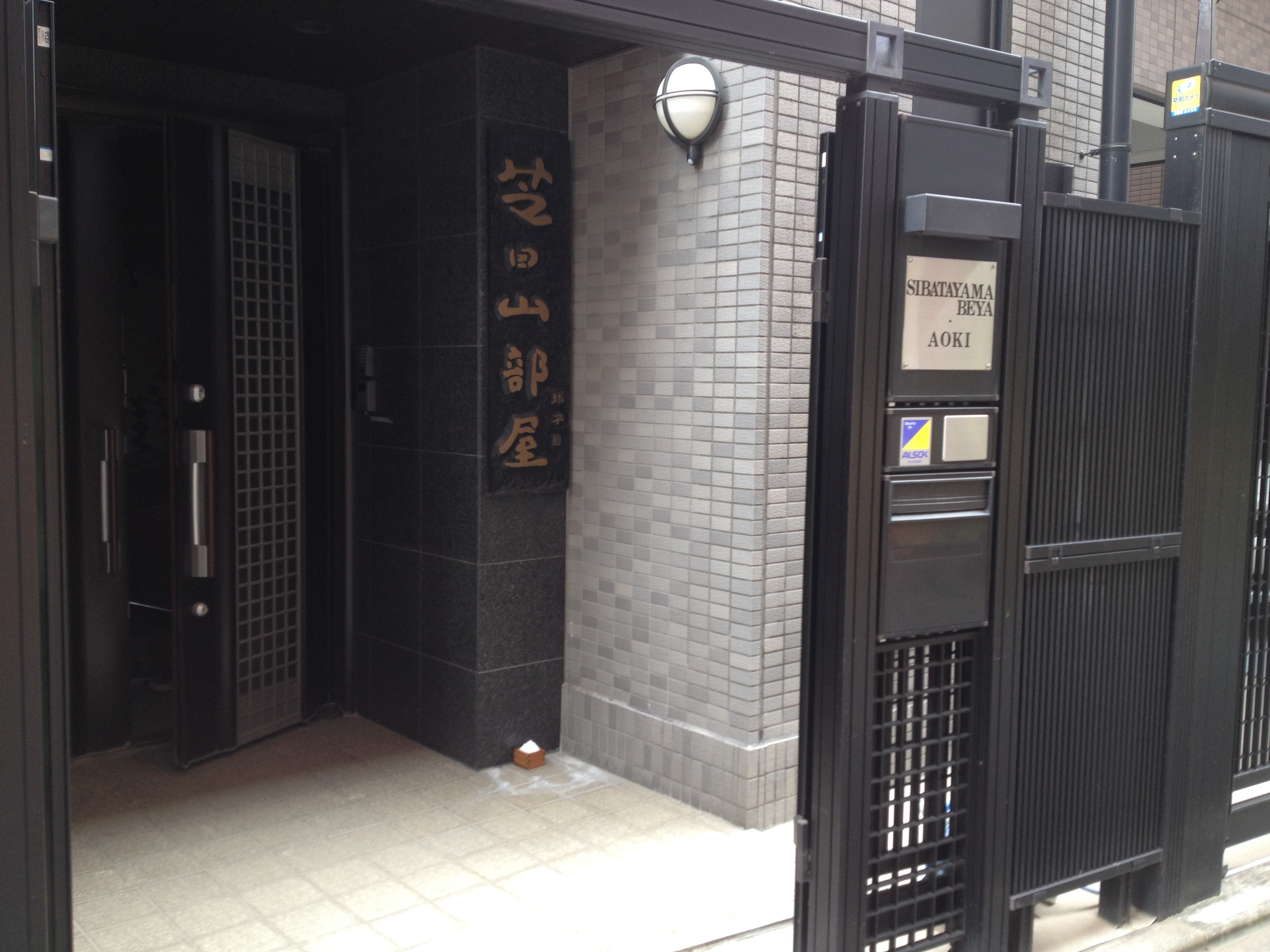

Shibatayama Stable (Japanese: 芝田山部屋, Shibatayama-beya) is a stable of sumo wrestlers, one of the Nishonoseki group of stables. It was founded in 1999 by former yokozuna Ōnokuni. Located in Suginami, it is the only stable to be situated in the western half of Tokyo as of 2020.

As of May 2026, the stable has 6 active wrestlers.

Mongolian born Daiyubu became the stable's first wrestler to earn promotion to the jūryō division, in March 2008, but he only lasted one tournament in the division and left sumo in acrimonious circumstances in 2010, claiming in a lawsuit that was eventually settled out of court that he had been forced to retire against his will. In February 2013 the stable absorbed its parent Hanaregoma stable due to the imminent retirement of its stablemaster, ōzeki Kaiketsu. Among the wrestlers transferring was another Mongolian, Sakigake, who was ranked in jūryō for five tournaments between January 2014 and January 2015. In January 2020 returned to jūryō after 30 tournaments away.

In March 2016 Shibatayama and wrestler Komanokuni were ordered by the Tokyo District Court to pay 32.4 million yen (287,500 USD) in compensation to a former wrestler who the court ruled had faced "daily abuse" since joining in 2008 and had to undergo four surgeries for a detached retina, eventually losing sight in the eye in 2013. Shibatayama appealed the ruling, and in November 2016 a court-mediated, confidential settlement was reached.

The stable is unusual in that its training dohyō is located in the basement.

In June 2025 the Sumo Association dismissed a Shibatayama stable gyōji, Kimura Ginjirō, for embezzling approximately 20 million yen from the reserve fund of the rikishi-kai (a wrestlers association composed of active sekitori competitors).

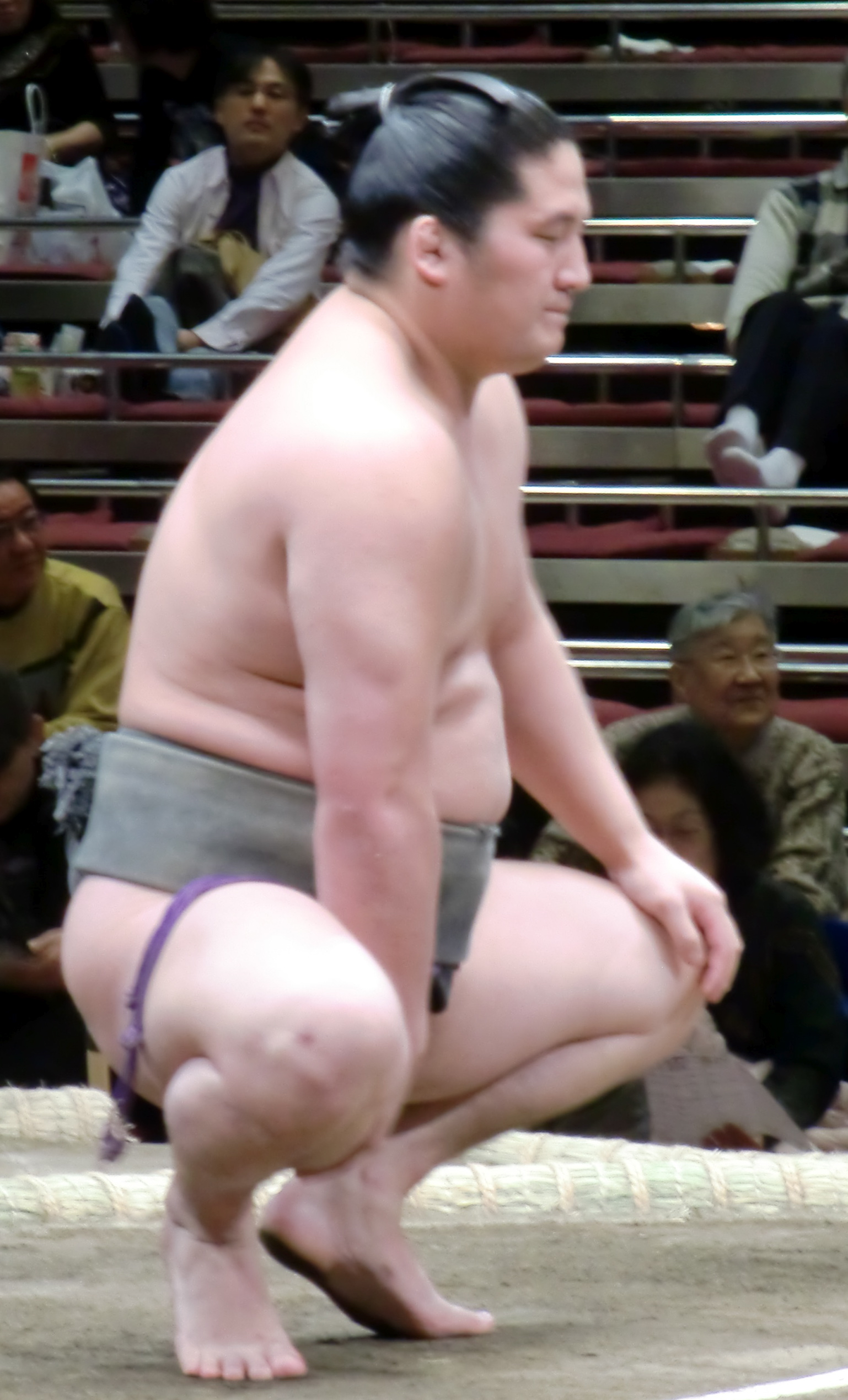
Daiyubu

== Ring name conventions ==
Many wrestlers at this stable take ring names or shikona that include either the character 大 (read: ō or dai) or 国 (read: kuni), in deference to their coach and the stable's owner, the former Ōnokuni whose shikona included both characters.

== Owner ==
- 1999–present: 12th Shibatayama (yakuin taigū iin, the 62nd yokozuna, Ōnokuni, born 1962)

== Notable active wrestlers ==
- None

== Notable past wrestlers ==
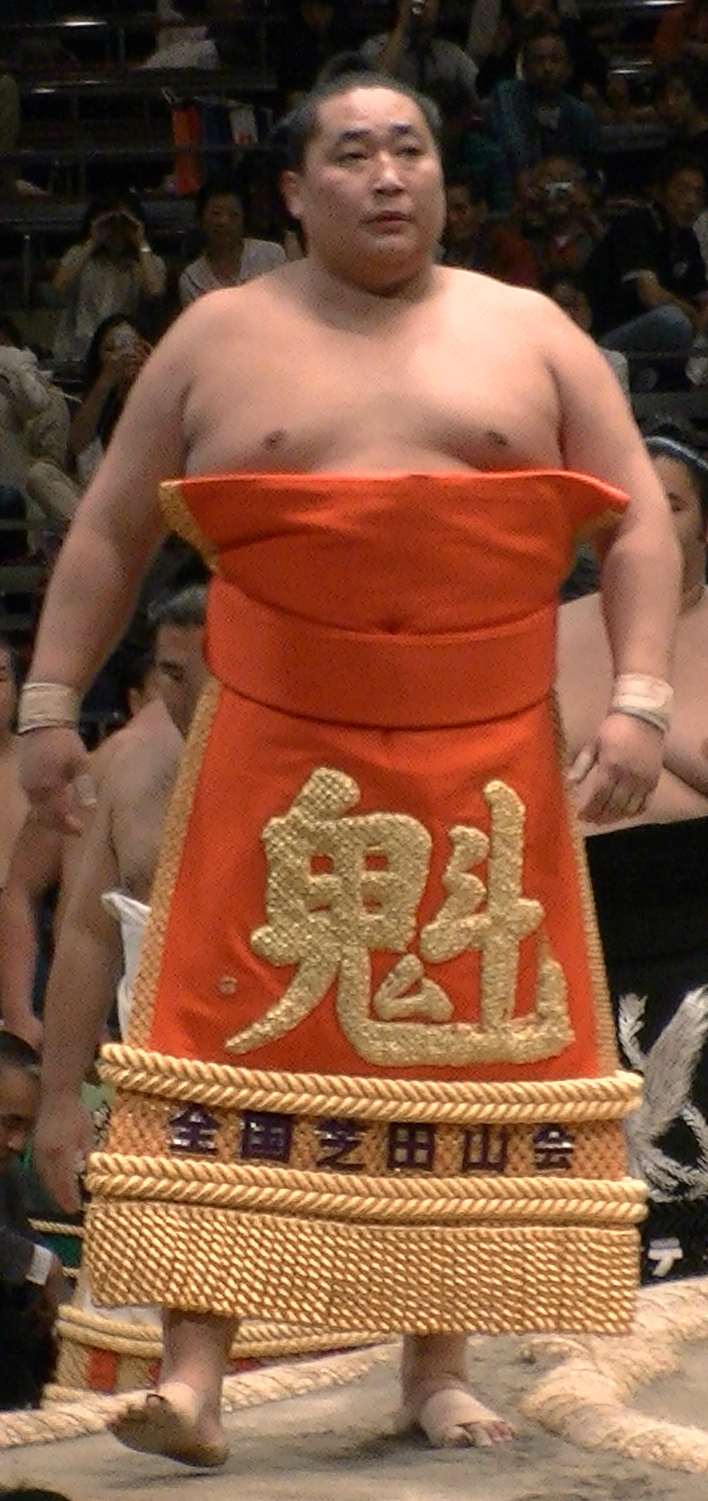
Mongolian Sakigake was the most senior wrestler at Shibatayama at the time of his retirement in 2022

- Wakanoshima (best rank jūryō 7, born 1984)
- Sakigake (best rank jūryō 10, born 1986)
- Daishōchi (best rank makushita 15, 1984–2020)

== Coach ==
- Minezaki (san'yo, maegashira Misugiiso, born 1956)

== Assistant ==
- Hananokuni (wakaimonogashira 1, maegashira, real name Akihiro Noguchi, born 1959)

== Referee ==
- Kimura Kichijirō (jūryō gyōji, real name Masahiro Nishino, born 1977)

== Ushers ==
- Katsuyuki (tate-yobidashi, real name Katsuyuki Koyama, born 1964)
- Keisukei (jūryō yobidashi, real name Daisuke Nakano, born 1983)

== Hairdresser ==
- Tokokado (first class tokoyama, born 1971)

== Location and access ==
Tokyo, Suginami, Takaido 2-26-9
2 minute walk from Takaido Station on the Inokashira Line

== See also ==
- List of sumo stables
- List of active sumo wrestlers
- List of past sumo wrestlers
- Glossary of sumo terms
