= Hanakago stable (1992–2012) =

Defunct sumo stable

Hanakago stable (花籠部屋, Hanakago beya) (1992–2012) was a sumo stable of the Nishonoseki group.

Its most recent incarnation dated from 1992 when it was revived by Daijuyama of the Futagoyama stable. The previous version of the stable had been wound up in 1985 when former yokozuna Wajima was forced to leave the Japan Sumo Association. The Mongolian rikishi Kōryū became the revived Hanakago's first sekitori in January 2007 and in July 2008 reached the top makuuchi division. The stable closed after the May 2012 tournament, with its wrestlers moving to Minezaki stable.

== Owner ==
- 1992–2012: 15th Hanakago (sekiwake Daijuyama Tadaaki)

== Notable members ==
- Kōryū

== Referees ==
- Mitsunosuke Kimura (Makoto Kawahara) - jūryō referee
- Kazuma Kimura (Kazuma Okada) - jonokuchi referee

== Ushers ==
- Masao (Noriyuki Otaka) - jūryō usher

== See also ==
- List of sumo stables
- List of sumo elders
- List of active sumo wrestlers
- List of past sumo wrestlers
- List of years in sumo
- Glossary of sumo terms
