= Tokoyama =

Traditional Japanese hairdresser

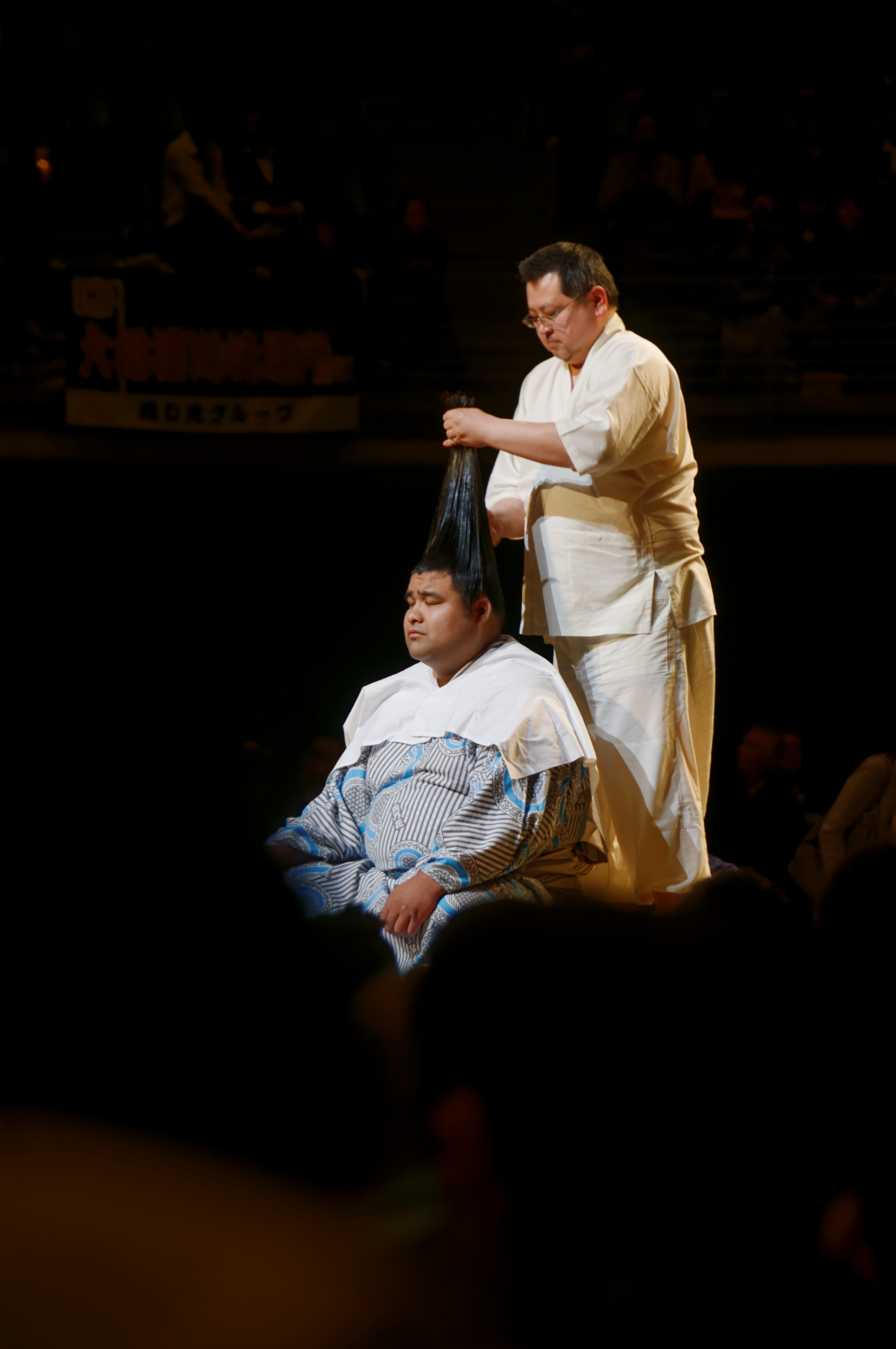
A tokoyama dressing the hair of professional sumo wrestler Takayasu

A tokoyama (床山) is a traditional Japanese hairdresser specializing in the theatrical arts (kabuki and bunraku) and professional sumo. The tokoyama trade is the result of a slow evolution from the traditional Japanese barbers of the Edo period, some of whom gradually started to specialize in hairstyles of actors, puppets, and rikishi. The word tokoyama uses a Japanese character meaning 'floor', because in the Edo period barbers had shops on simple raised floors.

Tokoyama use a variety of traditional techniques and tools, mainly combs, spikes and strings, to style the hair after oiling it. Although tokoyama maintain the use of techniques inherited from the Edo period, it is becoming increasingly difficult to maintain a traditional practice with the gradual disappearance of the craftsmen producing the oils and tools needed for traditional hairdressing.

Tokoyama maintain close relationships with those whose hair they arrange, often assigned to the particular service of a small group of people. In kabuki, this relationship leads the tokoyama to choose a specialization that will lead them to follow only actors dedicated to a particular style of acting. In bunraku, the hairdressers carry out the decisions of stewards who choose the hairstyles. In sumo, tokoyama are seen as essential elements of the sport, helping to maintain its traditional appearance.

== Traditional theater ==
=== Kabuki ===
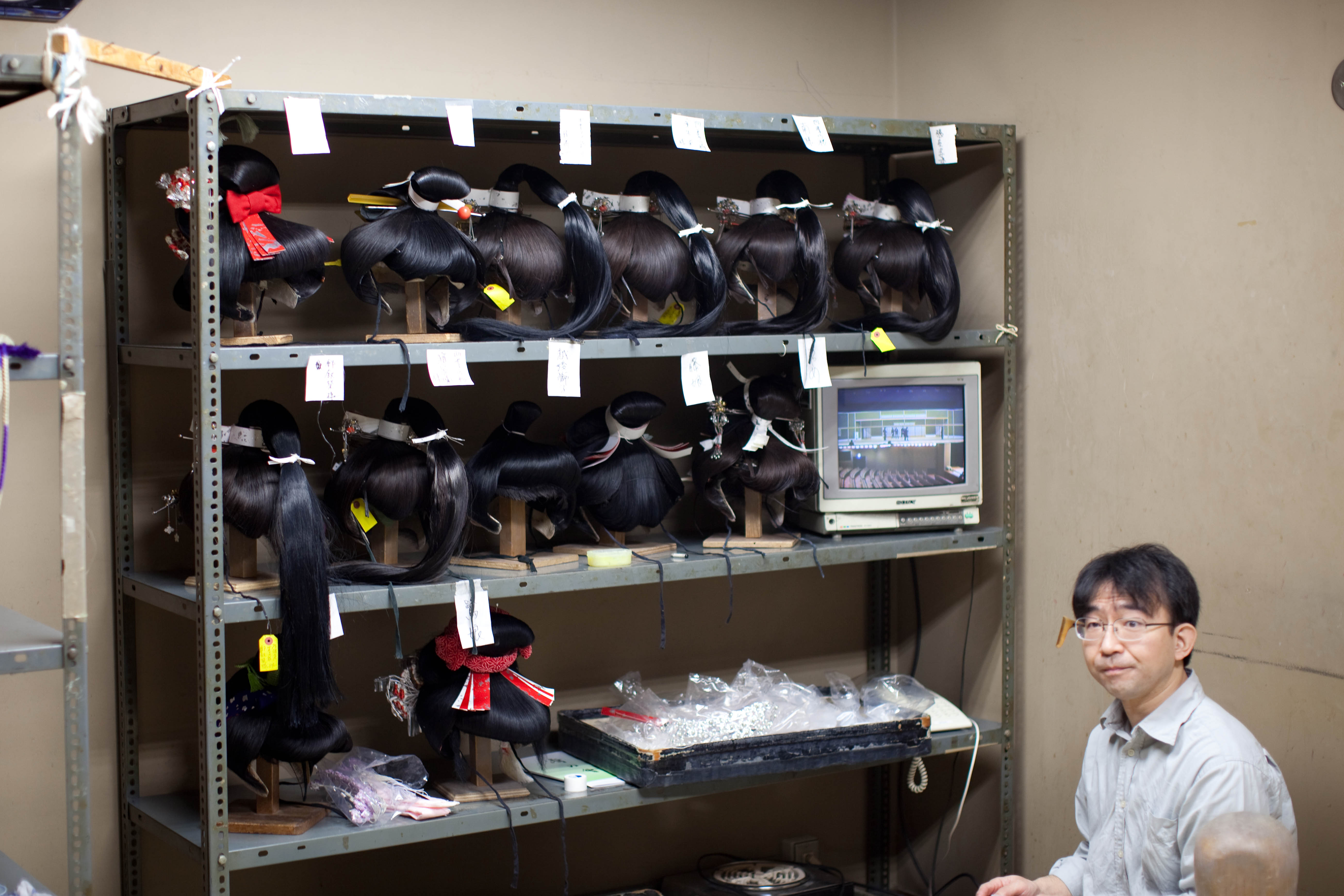
A kabuki tokoyama with various wigs backstage at a traditional theater.

In kabuki, the hairstyle, and more specifically the wig, is an important element of the art, as no actor appears on stage without one. The craftsmen who comb the actors' hair are called tokoyama. They are not responsible for creating the wigs (which is the responsibility of wig makers called the katsuraya), but for fitting and finishing them before the actors go on stage. Kabuki tokoyama are the only ones to be divided into groups called sangai tokoyama (三階床山; lit. 'third floor tokoyama') and nikai tokoyama (二階床山; lit. 'second floor tokoyama'). These names were inspired by the floors of the Kabuki-za on which the tokoyama work on their wigs. With each group of tokoyama comes a specialization, and the 'second floor' tokoyama specialize in styling the hair of actors playing female roles, while the 'third floor' specialize in styling male characters. Cases where a tokoyama does not specialize are rare, but they do exist. Kabuki tokoyama are assigned to specific actors on a full-time basis.

=== Bunraku ===
In bunraku, puppets are coiffed like real actors. Bunraku puppet theater is organized into two guilds. One, the Bunraku Kyokai, groups together the artists (shamisen players, puppeteers and narrators), while the other, the National Bunraku Theatre, groups together the support professions (costume and doll-head stewards). Tokoyama belong to the latter organization. Unlike in kabuki, the tokoyama in bunraku are responsible for both creating the wig and styling it. In bunraku, the tokoyama receives instructions from the kashirawari-iin, a theater steward selecting puppet heads from about 400 options, to show subtle differences in what the characters are expressing. Once the wig has been chosen, the tokoyama is then responsible for styling it to match the puppet. There are about 120 different hairstyles, with about 80 for men and 40 for women.

== Sumo ==
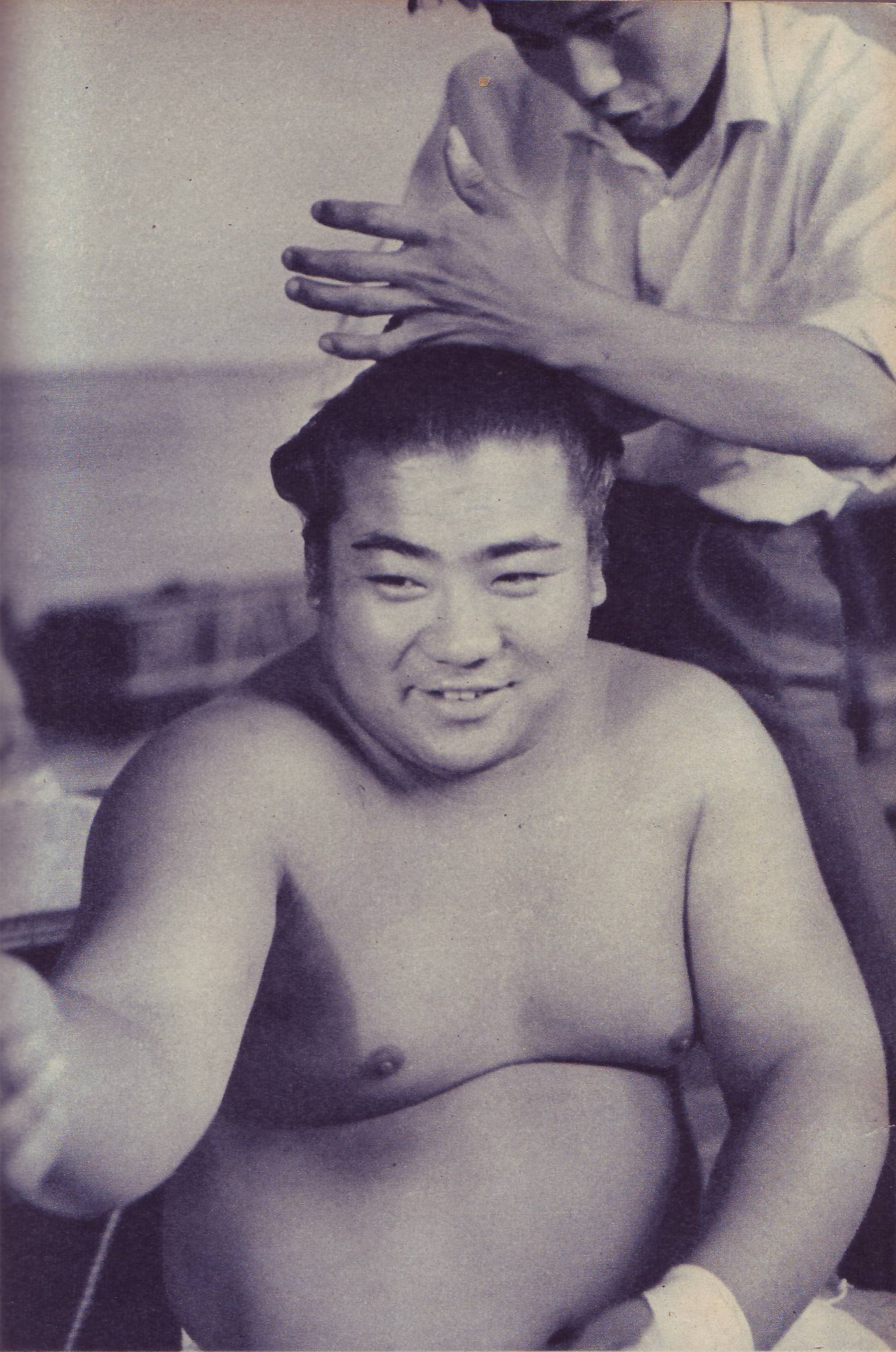
Former sekiwake Fusanishiki getting his hair done in 1961

In professional sumo, the tokoyama are employed by the Japan Sumo Association to cut and prepare wrestlers' hair, which is then styled in a chonmage style. Historically, wrestlers went to public barbershops to get their hair done. However, during the Meiji era, traditional barbers gradually disappeared as Western hairstyles became fashionable. To continue styling the hair of wrestlers who had maintained the tradition of wearing the chonmage topknot, tokoyama were borrowed for a time from kabuki theaters to serve wrestlers during tournaments. Eventually, tokoyama became an integral part of professional sumo and began training specifically to style the wrestlers' hair.

Today, the Sumo Association employs the tokoyama and ranks them according to experience and ability. There are around 50 tokoyama employed by the Sumo Association at all times, but new positions can be created if a stable with more than 12 wrestlers and no hairdresser requests so. Apprentices, all men aged 15 to 19, are attached to a sumo stable like other personnel such as gyōji (referee) or yobidashi (handymen). Stables that do not have their own tokoyama can rely on hairdressers from other stables belonging to the same ichimon (clan) to do their wrestlers' hair. Each tokoyama learns his trade from a senior member of staff. If a tokoyama's stable doesn't have a more experienced hairdresser, a hairdresser from the same ichimon will take over the apprenticeship. Tokoyama must train for at least seven years before they are considered capable of working on their own. Only the most senior tokoyama are entitled to prepare the more ornate ōichonmage, the ginkgo leaf shaped topknot which sekitori-ranked wrestlers wear in their bouts and on other formal occasions. This usually only happens after ten years' experience.

Tokoyama are divided into a hierarchical system that does not follow the names of sumo divisions, unlike the gyōji and yobidashi. Beginners start at fifth class (gotō) and are promoted according to their years of service and skills until they reach first class (ittō). Tokoyama are not considered qualified craftsmen (shikakusha) until they are promoted to the rank of second class (nitō). Promotion to third class takes around 10 years, while promotion to second and first class takes around 20 and 30 years respectively. When promoted to second class, tokoyama receive a higher salary and a bonus during tournaments. When they have reached first class and have demonstrated exceptional skill, tokoyama can ascend to tokutō, or 'special class' tokoyama. Promotion to this rank has very strict prerequisites and the tokoyama must have served for around 45 years and have demonstrated "excellent talents". There is normally a maximum of two tokoyama at this rank, although three special class tokoyama coexisted in 2019 (Tokohachi, Tokomatsu and Tokoyodo). Special class tokoyama are the only ones allowed to style the topknot of a yokozuna, a sumo wrestler of the highest rank. Tokoyama are subject to mandatory retirement at the age of 65.

In professional sumo, tokoyama work under a pseudonym that always starts with the kanji for 'floor' or 'bed' (床, pronounced toko) in their names. The rest of the tokoyama's name is usually derived from a kanji in his personal name, or from a kanji borrowed from the stable to which he belongs. Unlike gyōji, tokoyama names cannot be passed on and are therefore unique.

Special class tokoyama have also appeared on the banzuke since January 2008 and in January 2012, first-class tokoyama were also added.

Wrestlers' hairstyles are so important in the culture of sumo that the tokoyama profession is highly valued, with some former wrestlers employing their own hairdressers on their own money, like Taihō. Some wrestlers create close ties with their hairdresser, such as former yokozuna Hakuhō, whose hair was combed throughout his career by the same tokoyama, former special class tokoyama Tokohachi. The importance of tokoyama also extends to the founding of new stables, as their opening may be called into question if they are unable to obtain a hairdresser.

== Styling the haircut ==
A tokoyama styling the ōichonmage of Tamawashi

Depending on the environment in which they work, tokoyama may use strictly traditional tools, while others have more freedom and also use modern tools. Regardless of their professional environment, all the tokoyama use a special ointment called binzuke (also spelled bintsuke), renowned for its sturdiness, making it ideal for elaborate hairstyles. In sumo, the tokoyama only use binzuke produced by a company in Edogawa, Tokyo. In bunraku, tokoyama can make the most use of modern tools in hairstyling, such as hairsprays and hair dryers. However, they can not use oil in puppet headgear, as the puppet heads, made of cypress, would lose adhesion when color pigments are applied during restoration.

In both sumo and kabuki, the tokoyama use two kinds of oil (called sukiyu and chuneri) produced specifically for the manufacture of wigs. Sumo tokoyama use a sukiyu ointment made traditionally from rapeseed, Japan wax and vanilla fragrance. This ointment has a distinctive scent that is associated with professional sumo.

Professional sumo and kabuki tokoyama use combs and picks of various sizes. The special handmade combs are called kushi. Generally, these tools were made in the Kyoto Prefecture, although it seems that the last company to manufacture them is now based in Nagoya. Each type of comb is made from a different type of wood. An araigushi comb is first used on the hair, followed by a sukigushi to spread out the ointment and shine the hair. A soroigushi is used to tidy up the hair when everything is done. A maekaki is used only to make the ōichō style of topknot, where the hair is then spread out using a metal pick called a magebo. In sumo, it is also common for tokoyama to grow a thumbnail to facilitate styling.

As of the 2020s, however, it is becoming increasingly difficult to obtain the traditional tools and balms used to style the haircuts, as the craftsmen who produce them are all gradually retiring without replacement. This is notably the case of paper strings (called motoyui) used to tie up the hair of sumo wrestlers and kabuki actors' wigs, which were made by just one craftsman in Iida, Nagano until he was forced to close down his business for good in 2020, when all activities requiring his strings (sumo, kabuki, period drama) ceased due to COVID-19. In recent years, however, a few craftsmen have taken over the traditional manufacturing activities and two craftsmen now continue to produce motoyui. Ointment for wrestlers' heads is also in short supply, with fewer and fewer companies able to manufacture it due particularly to recruitment difficulties and the lack of a market with sufficient demand, and existing family businesses are unable to continue their activities after the current managers retire.

== See also ==
- Glossary of sumo terms
- Theatre of Japan
- Theatrical technician
- Hairstyle
