= List of sumo elders =

This is a list of elders of the Japan Sumo Association (JSA). More accurately called "elder stock" or toshiyori kabu, these names are a finite number of licenses that can be passed on, and are strictly controlled by the JSA. They allow certain advantageous privileges and there are official criteria for whether or not a retiring wrestler can acquire one. In 1927, the number of licenses was set at 105. For more information see toshiyori.

This list is in approximate order of the current elders' rank in the organization. Members with borrowed kabu are always at the bottom of the hierarchy (aside from consultants) and are listed here with the name of the owner, if known. Elections to the Board of Directors are held every two years; the latest was in March 2024.

== List of elders ==
List of sumo elders as of January 2026
Elder name	Ring name	Highest rank	Stable		Rank	Date of birth	Retirement
Elder name	Ring name	Highest rank	Name	Position	Rank	Date of birth	Retirement
Hakkaku	Hokutoumi Nobuyoshi	Yokozuna	Hakkaku	Master	Chairman	June 22, 1963 (age 63)	2028
Kasugano	Tochinowaka Kiyotaka	Sekiwake	Kasugano	Master	Director	May 22, 1962 (age 64)	2027
Sakaigawa	Ryōgoku Kajinosuke IV	Komusubi	Sakaigawa	Master	Director	July 30, 1962 (age 64)	2027
Dewanoumi	Oginohana Akikazu	Maegashira 2	Dewanoumi	Master	Director	November 18, 1967 (age 58)	2032
Shibatayama	Ōnokuni Yasushi	Yokozuna	Shibatayama	Master	Director	October 9, 1962 (age 63)	2027
Isenoumi	Kitakachidoki Hayato	Maegashira 3	Isenoumi	Master	Director	January 1, 1966 (age 60)	2031
Sadogatake	Kotonowaka Terumasa	Sekiwake	Sadogatake	Master	Director	May 15, 1968 (age 58)	2033
Katsunoura	Kirinishiki Toshirō	Maegashira 2	Isenoumi	Coach	Director	August 31, 1962 (age 63)	2027
Takadagawa	Akinoshima Katsumi	Sekiwake	Takadagawa	Master	Director	March 16, 1967 (age 59)	2032
Asakayama	Kaiō Hiroyuki	Ōzeki	Asakayama	Master	Director	July 24, 1972 (age 54)	2037
Fujishima	Musōyama Masashi	Ōzeki	Fujishima	Master	Deputy Director	February 14, 1972 (age 54)	2037
Wakamatsu	Asanowaka Takehiko	Maegashira 1	Takasago	Coach	Deputy Director	December 11, 1969 (age 56)	2034
Kumegawa	Kotoinazuma Yoshihiro	Komusubi	Sadogatake	Coach	Deputy Director	April 26, 1962 (age 64)	2027
Nishikido	Mitoizumi Masayuki	Sekiwake	Nishikido	Master	Special Executive	September 2, 1962 (age 63)	2027
Kokonoe	Chiyotaikai Ryūji	Ōzeki	Kokonoe	Master	Special Executive	April 29, 1976 (age 50)	2041
Nakadachi	Oginishiki Yasutoshi	Komusubi	Dewanoumi	Coach	Special Executive	July 8, 1971 (age 55)	2036
Kabutoyama	Ōikari Tsuyoshi	Maegashira 11	Isenoumi	Coach	Iin	June 16, 1972 (age 54)	2037
Oitekaze	Daishōyama Naoki	Maegashira 2	Oitekaze	Master	Iin	July 7, 1966 (age 60)	2031
Minato	Minatofuji Takayuki	Maegashira 2	Minato	Master	Iin	July 6, 1968 (age 58)	2033
Inagawa	Futen'ō Izumi	Komusubi	Kise	Coach	Iin	August 28, 1980 (age 45)	2045
Shikimori Hidegorō (Note: Commonly abbreviated to Shikihide)	Kitazakura Hidetoshi	Maegashira 9	Shikihide	Master	Iin	December 15, 1971 (age 54)	2036
Asahiyama	Kotonishiki Katsuhiro	Sekiwake	Asahiyama	Master	Iin	June 8, 1968 (age 58)	2033
Nakagawa	Asahisato Kenji	Maegashira 14	Tokitsukaze	Coach	Iin	November 9, 1965 (age 60)	2030
Tokiwayama	Takamisugi Takakatsu	Komusubi	Minatogawa	Coach	Iin	March 1, 1961 (age 65)	2026
Oshiogawa	Takekaze Akira	Sekiwake	Oshiogawa	Master	Iin	June 21, 1979 (age 47)	2044
Nakamura	Yoshikaze Masatsugu	Sekiwake	Nakamura	Master	Iin	March 19, 1982 (age 44)	2047
Arashio	Sōkokurai Eikichi	Maegashira 2	Arashio	Master	Iin	January 9, 1984 (age 42)	2049
Yamahibiki	Ganyū Kenji	Maegashira 1	Yamahibiki	Master	Iin	August 6, 1970 (age 56)	2035
Kataonami	Tamakasuga Ryōji	Sekiwake	Kataonami	Master	Iin	January 7, 1972 (age 54)	2037
Yamawake	Buyūzan Takeyoshi	Maegashira 1	Fujishima	Coach	Iin	July 29, 1974 (age 52)	2039
Musashigawa	Musashimaru Kōyō	Yokozuna	Musashigawa	Master	Iin	May 2, 1971 (age 55)	2036
Tagonoura	Takanotsuru Shinichi	Maegashira 8	Tagonoura	Master	Iin	June 18, 1976 (age 50)	2041
Tamagaki	Tomonohana Shinya	Komusubi	Ōshima	Coach	Iin	June 23, 1964 (age 62)	2029
Ōnaruto	Dejima Takeharu	Ōzeki	Fujishima	Coach	Iin	March 21, 1974 (age 52)	2039
Tatekawa	Tosanoumi Toshio	Sekiwake	Isenoumi	Coach	Iin	February 16, 1972 (age 54)	2037
Urakaze	Shikishima Katsumori	Maegashira 1	Arashio	Coach	Iin	December 15, 1970 (age 55)	2035
Futagoyama	Miyabiyama Tetsushi	Ōzeki	Futagoyama	Master	Iin	July 28, 1977 (age 49)	2042
Naruto	Kotoōshū Katsunori	Ōzeki	Naruto	Master	Iin	February 19, 1983 (age 43)	2048
Ikazuchi	Kakizoe Tōru	Komusubi	Ikazuchi	Master	Iin	August 12, 1978 (age 48)	2043
Azumazeki	Takamisakari Seiken	Komusubi	Hakkaku	Coach	Iin	May 12, 1976 (age 50)	2041
Hanaregoma	Tamanoshima Arata	Sekiwake	Hanaregoma	Master	Iin	September 15, 1977 (age 48)	2042
Ōshima	Kyokutenhō Masaru	Sekiwake	Ōshima	Master	Iin	September 13, 1974 (age 51)	2039
Tokitsukaze	Tosayutaka Yūya	Maegashira 1	Tokitsukaze	Master	Iin	March 10, 1985 (age 41)	2050
Takasago	Asasekiryū Tarō	Sekiwake	Takasago	Master	Iin	August 7, 1981 (age 45)	2046
Nishonoseki	Kisenosato Yutaka	Yokozuna	Nishonoseki	Master	Iin	July 3, 1986 (age 40)	2051
Hidenoyama	Kotoshōgiku Kazuhiro	Ōzeki	Sadogatake	Coach	Iin	January 30, 1984 (age 42)	2049
Otowayama	Kakuryū Rikisaburō	Yokozuna	Otowayama	Master	Iin	August 10, 1985 (age 41)	2050
Ajigawa	Aminishiki Ryūji	Sekiwake	Ajigawa	Master	Iin	October 3, 1978 (age 47)	2043
Tateyama	Homarefuji Yoshiyuki	Maegashira 6	Isegahama	Coach	Iin	May 6, 1985 (age 41)	2050
Kiyomigata	Tochiōzan Yūichirō	Sekiwake	Kasugano	Coach	Iin	March 9, 1987 (age 39)	2052
Fujigane	Daizen Takahiro	Komusubi	Kasugano	Coach	Iin	December 14, 1964 (age 61)	2029
Hatachiyama	Tochinohana Hitoshi	Komusubi	Kasugano	Coach	Iin	February 28, 1973 (age 53)	2038
Takasaki	Kinkaiyama Ryū	Maegashira 6	Dewanoumi	Coach	Iin	January 7, 1976 (age 50)	2041
Ōnomatsu	Daidō Kenji	Maegashira 8	Ōnomatsu	Master	Iin	August 21, 1982 (age 44)	2047
Wakafuji	Ōtsukasa Nobuhide	Maegashira 4	Kise	Coach	Iin	February 18, 1971 (age 55)	2036
Takenawa	Tochinonada Taiichi	Sekiwake	Kasugano	Coach	Iin	February 26, 1974 (age 52)	2039
Ōtake	Tamaasuka Daisuke	Maegashira 9	Ōtake	Master	Iin	January 26, 1983 (age 43)	2048
Chiganoura	Satoyama Kōsaku	Maegashira 12	Onoe	Coach	Iin	May 31, 1981 (age 45)	2046
Mihogaseki	Tochisakae Atsushi	Maegashira 1	Kasugano	Coach	Iin	June 27, 1974 (age 52)	2039
Shiranui	Wakakōyū Masaya	Komusubi	Ōnomatsu	Coach	Iin	February 24, 1984 (age 42)	2049
Onogawa	Kitataiki Akeyoshi	Maegashira 2	Yamahibiki	Coach	Iin	October 5, 1982 (age 43)	2047
Tatsunami	Asahiyutaka Katsuteru	Komusubi	Tatsunami	Master	Iin	September 10, 1968 (age 57)	2033
Edagawa	Aogiyama Hideki	Maegashira 1	Tokitsukaze	Coach	Iin	February 18, 1970 (age 56)	2035
Tamanoi	Tochiazuma Daisuke	Ōzeki	Tamanoi	Master	Iin	November 9, 1976 (age 49)	2041
Tanigawa	Hokutōriki Hideki	Sekiwake	Kokonoe	Coach	Iin	October 31, 1977 (age 48)	2042
Matsugane	Tamarikido Hideki	Maegashira 8	Hanaregoma	Coach	Iin	April 19, 1974 (age 52)	2039
Onoe	Hamanoshima Keishi	Komusubi	Onoe	Master	Iin	March 21, 1970 (age 56)	2035
Shikoroyama	Hōmashō Noriyuki	Komusubi	Shikoroyama	Master	Iin	April 16, 1981 (age 45)	2046
Takekuma	Gōeidō Gōtarō	Ōzeki	Takekuma	Master	Iin	April 6, 1986 (age 40)	2051
Hamakaze	Gojōrō Katsuhiro	Maegashira 3	Sadogatake	Coach	Iin	August 18, 1973 (age 53)	2038
Sekinoto	Iwakiyama Ryūta	Komusubi	Sakaigawa	Coach	Iin	March 2, 1976 (age 50)	2041
Matsuchiyama	Bushūyama Takashi	Maegashira 3	Fujishima	Coach	Iin	May 21, 1976 (age 50)	2041
Nishiiwa	Wakanosato Shinobu	Sekiwake	Nishiiwa	Master	Iin	July 10, 1976 (age 50)	2041
Yamashina	Toyohibiki Ryūta	Maegashira 2	Sakaigawa	Coach	Shunin	November 16, 1984 (age 41)	2049
Kasugayama	Ikioi Shōta	Sekiwake	Isenoumi	Coach	Shunin	October 11, 1986 (age 39)	2051
Tomozuna	Kaisei Ichiro	Sekiwake	Asakayama	Coach	Shunin	December 18, 1986 (age 39)	2051
Kimigahama	Okinoumi Ayumi	Sekiwake	Hakkaku	Coach	Shunin	July 29, 1985 (age 41)	2050
Minatogawa	Takakeishō Takanobu	Ōzeki	Minatogawa	Master	Iin taigu toshiyori	August 5, 1996 (age 30)	2061
Isegahama	Terunofuji Haruo	Yokozuna	Isegahama	Master	Iin taigu toshiyori	November 29, 1991 (age 34)	2056
Kimura Sehei (Note: Commonly abbreviated to Kise)	Higonoumi Naoya	Maegashira 1	Kise	Master	Toshiyori	September 23, 1969 (age 56)	2034
Magaki	Ishiura Shikanosuke	Maegashira 5	Isegahama (Note: Transferred from Miyagino stable)	Coach	Toshiyori	January 10, 1990 (age 36)	2055
Araiso	Kotoyūki Kazuyoshi	Sekiwake	Sadogatake	Coach	Toshiyori	April 2, 1991 (age 35)	2056
Sanoyama	Chiyonokuni Toshiki	Maegashira 1	Kokonoe	Coach	Toshiyori	July 10, 1990 (age 36)	2055
Oguruma	Kotoekō Mitsunori	Maegashira 4	Sadogatake	Coach	Toshiyori	November 20, 1991 (age 34)	2056
Furiwake	Myōgiryū Yasunari	Sekiwake	Sakaigawa	Coach	Toshiyori	October 22, 1986 (age 39)	2051
Iwatomo	Aoiyama Kōsuke	Sekiwake	Kasugano	Coach	Toshiyori	June 19, 1986 (age 40)	2051
Sendagawa	Tokushōryū Makoto	Maegashira 2	Kise	Coach	Toshiyori	August 22, 1986 (age 40)	2051
Ōyama	Hokutofuji Daiki	Komusubi	Hakkaku	Coach	Toshiyori	July 15, 1992 (age 34)	2057
Kiriyama	Takarafuji Daisuke	Sekiwake	Isegahama	Coach	Toshiyori	February 18, 1987 (age 39)	2052
Kitajin	Endō Shōta	Komusubi	Oitekaze	Coach	Toshiyori	October 19, 1990 (age 35)	2055
Tatsutagawa	Hōchiyama Kōkan (Note: Likely borrowed from the family of the late Terao Tsunefumi)	Maegashira 14	Sakaigawa	Coach	Toshiyori	January 18, 1982 (age 44)	2047
Dekiyama	Shōtenrō Taishi (Note: Borrowed from retired Dewanohana Yoshitaka)	Maegashira 2	Fujishima	Coach	Toshiyori	January 31, 1982 (age 44)	2047
Nishikijima	Chiyoōtori Yūki (Note: Borrowed from the family of the late Asashio Tarō IV)	Komusubi	Kokonoe	Coach	Toshiyori	October 11, 1992 (age 33)	2057
Minezaki	Misugiiso Takuya	Maegashira 2	Shibatayama	Coach	Consultant	May 11, 1956 (age 70)	2021/2026* (Note: Re-hired as consultant on reduced pay for five years after mandatory retirement)
Tatsutayama	Sasshūnada Yasutaka	Maegashira 1	Oitekaze	Coach	Consultant	June 7, 1957 (age 69)	2022/2027*
Takashima	Kōbōyama Daizō	Sekiwake	Oitekaze	Coach	Consultant	August 15, 1957 (age 69)	2022/2027*
Kagamiyama	Tagaryū Shōji	Sekiwake	Isenoumi	Coach	Consultant	February 15, 1958 (age 68)	2023/2028*
Irumagawa	Tochitsukasa Tetsuo	Sekiwake	Ikazuchi	Coach	Consultant	April 25, 1958 (age 68)	2023/2028*
Michinoku	Kirishima Kazuhiro	Ōzeki	Otowayama	Coach	Consultant	April 3, 1959 (age 67)	2024/2029*
Hanakago	Daijuyama Tadaaki	Sekiwake	Takadagawa	Coach	Consultant	April 11, 1959 (age 67)	2024/2029*
Miyagino	Asahifuji Seiya	Yokozuna	Isegahama	Coach	Consultant	July 6, 1960 (age 66)	2025/2030*
Kumagatani	Dairyū Tadahiro	Jūryō 4	Ōtake	Coach	Consultant	September 30, 1960 (age 65)	2025/2030*
Jinmaku	Fujinoshin Tsukasa	Maegashira 1	Hakkaku	Coach	Consultant	November 6, 1960 (age 65)	2025/2030*
Shiratama	Kototsubaki Katsuyuki	Maegashira 3	Sadogatake	Coach	Consultant	December 6, 1960 (age 65)	2025/2030*

== Explanation of ranks ==
The sumo elder hierarchy from the top rank down is as follows:

- rijichō (理事長, Chairman)
- riji (理事, Director)
- fuku-riji (副理事, Deputy director)
- yakuin taigū iin (役員待遇委員, Special executive)
- iin (委員, Committee member)
- shunin (主任, Senior member)
- iin taigū toshiyori (委員待遇年寄, Elder receiving iin privileges)
- toshiyori (年寄, Elder)
- san'yo (参与, Consultant) (elders re-hired as consultant between 65 and 70 years old)

Elders who do not own but borrow their elder names are always toshiyori. They are not allowed to be stablemasters.

Hyōgi-in (評議員; lit. 'Councilor') is not a rank, but a group of independent councillors who act as a kind of supervisory board for the directors. Initially there were three Internal Councillors (Ōtake, Futagoyama and Minatogawa) and four External Councillors (persons outside the sumo world). The Internal Councillors were ranked as iin prior to taking office and returned to that rank at the conclusion of their four-year term. In March 2018 they were replaced by three former wrestlers who are completely outside the Sumo Association: Fujinokawa, Washūyama and Asanosho.

== See also ==
- List of sumo stables
