= Hanaregoma stable (active) =

Organization of sumo wrestlers

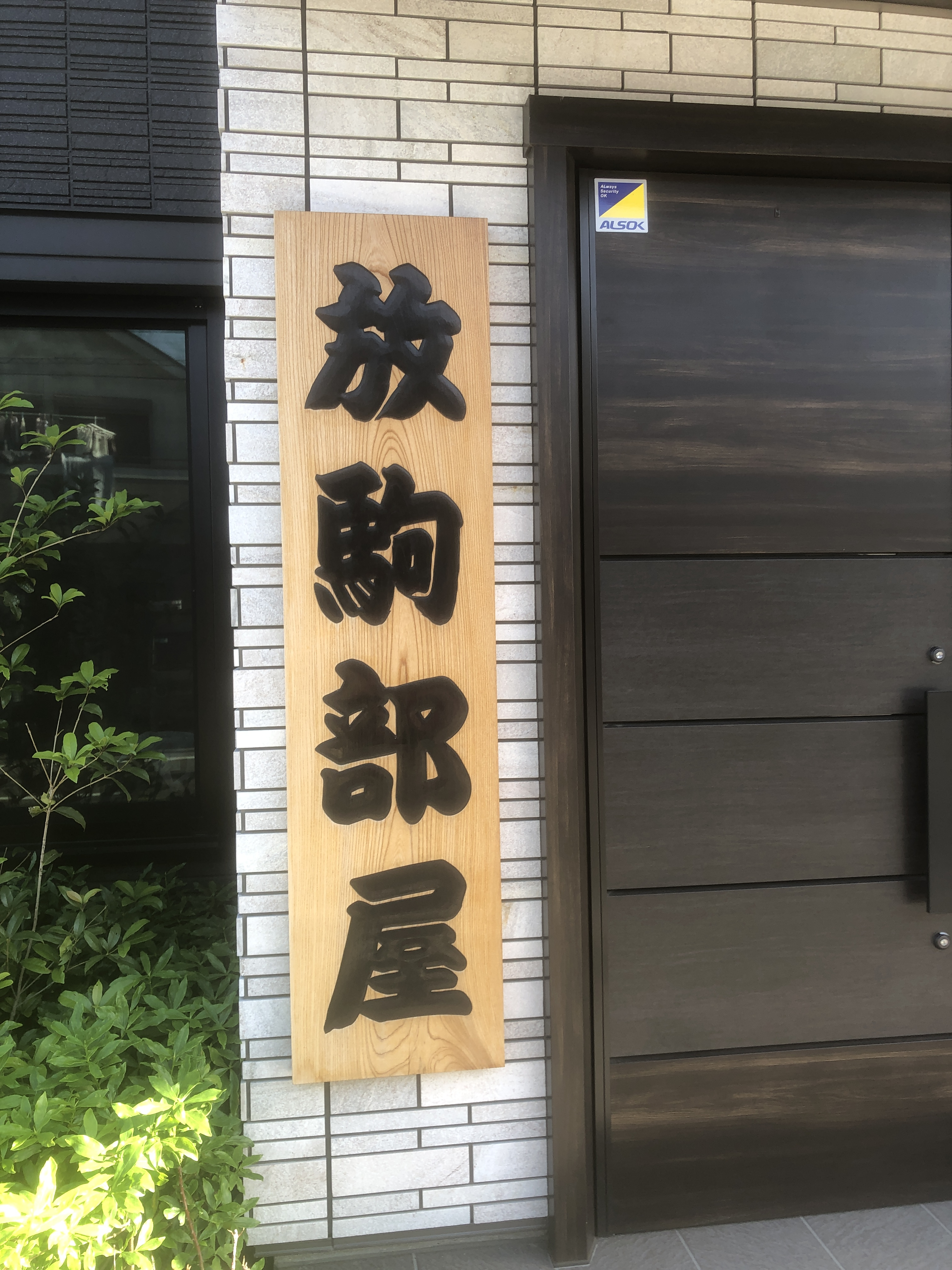

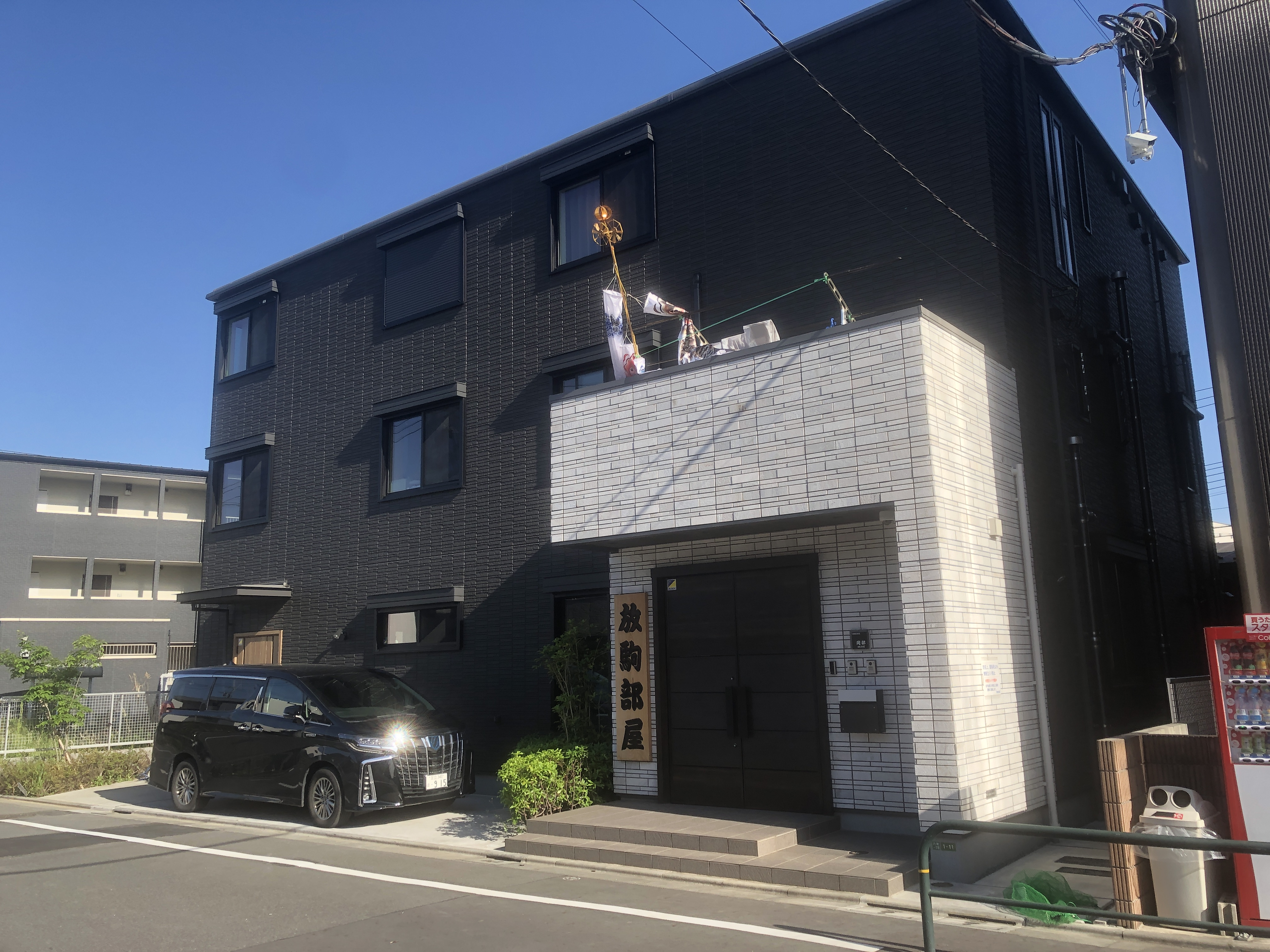

Hanaregoma stable (放駒部屋, Hanaregoma beya), formerly known as Matsugane stable and Nishonoseki stable, is a stable of sumo wrestlers. It was founded in 1990 as Matsugane stable by Wakashimazu who branched out from the Futagoyama stable and changed its name to Hanaregoma in 2021. It has produced five top makuuchi division wrestlers; Wakakoshō (2000), Wakatsutomu (2001), Harunoyama (2004), Shōhōzan (2011) and Ichiyamamoto (2021). After the retirement of Harunoyama in November 2006 the stable had no sekitori until Shōhōzan (then known as Matsutani) reached the jūryō division in March 2010. As of May 2026, the stable has 11 active wrestlers.

In late 2014, the general consensus among those with connections to the Nishonoseki ichimon was that an ichimon so named without a Nishonoseki stable as its head was a misnomer. In accordance with this general opinion, the oyakata of Matsugane stable, which had absorbed support personnel from the defunct Nishonoseki when it closed, decided to revive the name. He switched his Matsugane elder name with the former Tamarikidō's Nishonoseki elder name, thus allowing him to rename the stable. The former Tamarikidō, now known as Matsugane, also joined the newly renamed stable.

In December 2021 the Japan Sumo Association approved the transfer of the stable to Hanaregoma (sekiwake Tamanoshima); the stable changed its name to Hanaregoma stable accordingly. Nishonoseki swapped elder names with former yokozuna Kisenosato, and became Araiso.

== Ring name conventions ==
Some wrestlers at this stable take ring names or shikona that begin with the character 若 (read: waka), meaning young, in deference to their former coach and the stable's founder, the former Wakashimazu.

== Owner ==
- 2021–present: Hanaregoma Arata (iin, sekiwake Tamanoshima, born 1977)
- 1990–2021: (former ōzeki Wakashimazu, 1957–2026), known as Matsugane from 1990 to 2014 and Nishonoseki from 2014 to 2021

== Notable active wrestlers ==
- Ichiyamamoto (best rank maegashira, born 1993)
- Shimazuumi (best rank maegashira, born 1996)

== Coaches ==
- Araiso Mutsuo (ōzeki Wakashimazu, born 1957)
- Minatogawa Tadamitsu (iin, komusubi Daitetsu, born 1956)
- Matsugane Hideki (iin, maegashira Tamarikidō, born 1974)

== Notable former members ==
- Shōhōzan (former komusubi, born 1984)
- Harunoyama (former maegashira, born 1976)
- Wakatsutomu (former maegashira, born 1973)

== Referees ==
- Shikimori Kindayū (makuuchi gyōji, real name Hiromitsu Oshida, nephew of Kirinji Kazuharu, born 1973)
- Shikimori Shinnosuke (jūryō gyōji, real name Yōji Mizutani, born 1976)

== Ushers ==
- Matsuo (jūryō yobidashi, real name Yoshihiro Mine, born 1976)
- Satoru (jūryō yobidashi, real name Satoru Asakura, born 1977)

== Hairdressers ==
- Tokoshima (1st class tokoyama, born 1969)

== Location and access ==
Chiba prefecture, Funabashi City, Kosaku 4-13-1
10 minute walk from Funabashihōten Station on Musashino Line

== See also ==
- List of sumo stables
- List of active sumo wrestlers
- List of past sumo wrestlers
- Glossary of sumo terms
