= Takanotsuru Shinichi =

Japanese sumo wrestler (born 1976)

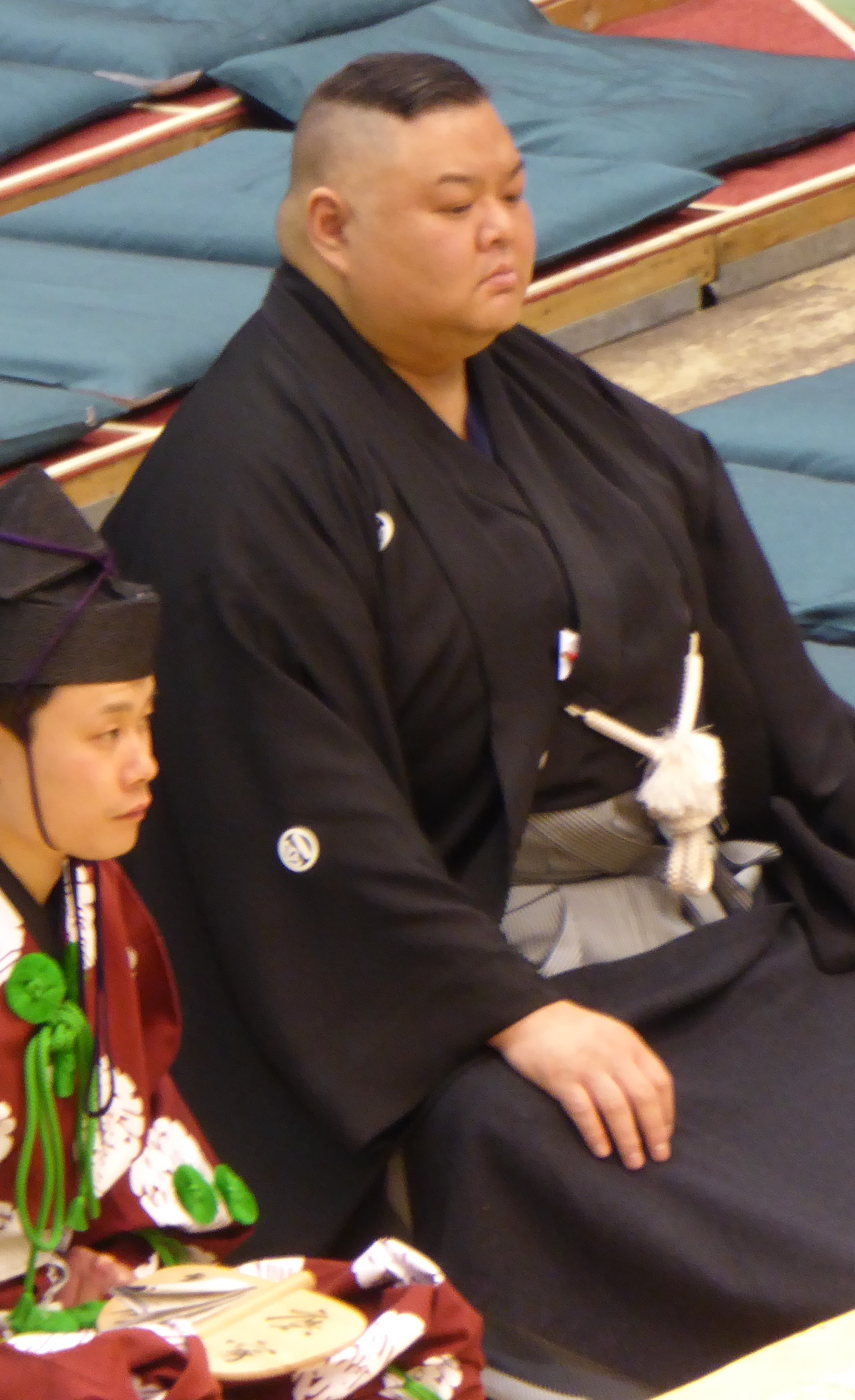

Personal information
- Native name: 隆の鶴 伸一
- Born: Shinichi Sekiyama; 18 June 1976 (age 50) Izumi, Kagoshima, Japan
- Height: 1.88 m (6 ft 2 in)
- Weight: 168 kg (370 lb)

Sport
- Sport: Sumo
- Retired: May, 2006
- Heya: Naruto
- Record: 393-364-71
- Debut: March, 1992
- Highest rank: Maegashira 8 (March, 2003)
- Elder name: Tagonoura
- Championships: 1 (Jonidan)
- Updated on August 2012

Takanotsuru Shinichi (born 18 June 1976 as Shinichi Sekiyama) is a former sumo wrestler from Izumi, Kagoshima, Japan. He made his professional debut in March 1992, and reached the top division in January 2003. His highest rank was maegashira 8. He retired in May 2006 and became an elder in the Japan Sumo Association coaching at Naruto stable.

== Career ==
He was the eldest son of a barber. Both his parents were deaf so he learned Japanese sign language before he could even write properly. He did judo in middle school, with no sumo experience. He was recruited by the former yokozuna Takanosato who happened to be in Izumi City and initially took in a friend of his before being told by him there was another boy even bigger. He began his sumo career in March 1992 at Naruto stable, joining at the same time as Wakanosato and Takanowaka. He had had problems with his right foot since childhood, and had to have foot surgery in September 1995, forcing him to miss two tournaments and fall from sandanme to jonidan. He returned to win the jonidan championship with a 7-0 record, but continued to feel pain, this time in both legs, and underwent a second, major surgery which involved cutting off both big toes to remove the nerves and then re-attaching them. He was hospitalized for 11 months, in such acute pain that he could not walk, and missed five straight tournaments. He began his career all over again in May 1997, having fallen off the banzuke completely, and was eventually promoted to the jūryō division after the January 2001 tournament. He reached the top makuuchi division in January 2003.

Takanotsuru scored 9-6 in his top division debut, but in July 2003 a disastrous 0-11-4 record due to a dislocated shoulder saw him demoted to jūryō, and the following tournament he was demoted again to makushita. He had to move out of his private room at the stable and go back to the communal quarters for low rankers, and had to do tsukebito duties again for Wakanosato. However, he returned to jūryō after a 6-1 record in September 2003, and in September 2004 was promoted back to makuuchi. His fifth and final top division tournament was in November 2004. He remained in jūryō until March 2006, when a score of just one win against fourteen losses saw him demoted back to makushita.

== Retirement from sumo ==
After six straight losses in the May 2006 tournament, Takanotsuru announced his retirement and became an elder of the Japan Sumo Association. He had jun-toshiyori status for a year and then borrowed the Nishiiwa kabu from May 2007. He became Naruto Oyakata and took over as stablemaster of Naruto when the previous stablemaster (ex-yokozuna Takanosato) died in November 2011. Due to a dispute with Takanosato's widow over who owned the Naruto stock he changed his oyakata name to Tagonoura in December 2013 and changed the stable name to Tagonoura stable. He oversaw the promotion of Kisenosato to yokozuna in January 2017, and Takayasu to ōzeki in May of the same year. He commented on Kisenosato's retirement in January 2019, "I was delighted when he became yokozuna but when you see him closely, you can tell that he was struggling a lot. These two years went like a flash."

Tagonoura and his wife divorced after she had an affair with one of Tagonoura stable's wrestlers in September 2019. He was criticized after a photo emerged of him drunk and asleep in a restaurant during the July 2020 tournament, despite the Sumo Association's instructions for all its members to avoid unnecessary trips outside of their stables during the COVID-19 pandemic.

== Fighting style ==
Takanotsuru was a yotsu-sumo specialist who usually won by yorikiri or force out. His preferred grip on his opponent's mawashi was hidari-yotsu, a right hand outside, left hand inside position. He was often compared to Tōki, due to their similar build and appearance, with both sporting distinctive sideburns. The two met eight times in total in the ring, with Takanotsuru holding a 5-3 advantage. However their fighting styles were quite different, with Tōki preferring pushing and thrusting techniques.

== Personal life ==
In December 2025, Takanotsuru, then aged 49, revealed to the press that he had married a fan, seventeen years his junior, in September of the same year.

== Career record ==
Takanotsuru Shinichi
Year	January Hatsu basho, Tokyo	March Haru basho, Osaka	May Natsu basho, Tokyo	July Nagoya basho, Nagoya	September Aki basho, Tokyo	November Kyūshū basho, Fukuoka
1992	x	(Maezumo)	East Jonokuchi #28; 4–3	East Jonidan #140; 4–3	West Jonidan #107; 2–5	East Jonidan #147; 3–4
1993	East Jonokuchi #4; 3–4	East Jonokuchi #13; 5–2	West Jonidan #123; 4–3	East Jonidan #93; 3–4	West Jonidan #116; 4–3	West Jonidan #84; 4–3
1994	West Jonidan #64; 5–2	East Jonidan #23; 4–3	West Jonidan #1; 5–2	East Sandanme #71; 3–4	West Sandanme #92; 6–1	East Sandanme #38; 3–4
1995	East Sandanme #56; 3–4	East Sandanme #74; 3–4	West Sandanme #87; 5–2	West Sandanme #55; 5–2	West Sandanme #28; Sat out due to injury 0–0–7	East Sandanme #86; Sat out due to injury 0–0–7
1996	West Jonidan #46; 7–0–P; Champion	East Sandanme #49; 4–3	East Sandanme #34; 4–3	East Sandanme #19; Sat out due to injury 0–0–7	East Sandanme #79; Sat out due to injury 0–0–7	East Jonidan #40; Sat out due to injury 0–0–7
1997	East Jonidan #111; Sat out due to injury 0–0–7	West Jonokuchi #2; Sat out due to injury 0–0–7	(Maezumo)	East Jonokuchi #56; 6–1	East Jonidan #128; 7–0–PP	West Sandanme #94; 5–2
1998	West Sandanme #63; 4–3	East Sandanme #45; 5–2	East Sandanme #20; 4–3	East Sandanme #8; 5–2	West Makushita #47; 2–5	East Sandanme #9; 5–2
1999	East Makushita #47; 4–3	West Makushita #37; 3–4	East Makushita #50; 4–3	East Makushita #41; 4–3	East Makushita #31; 2–3–2	West Makushita #46; 5–2
2000	East Makushita #33; 5–2	East Makushita #18; 4–3	West Makushita #12; 4–3	East Makushita #9; 2–5	West Makushita #19; 6–1	West Makushita #4; 4–3
2001	East Makushita #3; 4–3	West Jūryō #13; 9–6	East Jūryō #8; 7–8	West Jūryō #10; 7–8	East Jūryō #12; 10–5	West Jūryō #7; 6–9
2002	Jūryō #9; Sat out due to injury 0–0–15	West Jūryō #9; 7–8	West Jūryō #10; 9–6	East Jūryō #5; 9–6	East Jūryō #3; 8–7	East Jūryō #2; 10–5
2003	West Maegashira #12; 9–6	West Maegashira #8; 4–11	East Maegashira #14; 0–11–4	West Jūryō #10; 5–10	East Makushita #1; 6–1	West Jūryō #9; 8–7
2004	East Jūryō #5; 6–9	East Jūryō #9; 9–6	East Jūryō #6; 8–7	West Jūryō #2; 9–6	West Maegashira #16; 9–6	West Maegashira #12; 4–11
2005	East Jūryō #3; 6–9	East Jūryō #6; 8–7	East Jūryō #3; 4–11	East Jūryō #11; 7–8	East Jūryō #12; 7–8	West Jūryō #12; 8–7
2006	East Jūryō #7; 6–9	West Jūryō #10; 1–14	West Makushita #8; Retired; 0–6	x	x	x
Record given as wins–losses–absences Top division champion Top division runner-up Retired Lower divisions Non-participation Sanshō key: F=Fighting spirit; O=Outstanding performance; T=Technique Also shown: ★=Kinboshi; P=Playoff(s); Divisions: Makuuchi — Jūryō — Makushita — Sandanme — Jonidan — Jonokuchi Makuuchi ranks: Yokozuna — Ōzeki — Sekiwake — Komusubi — Maegashira

== See also ==
- Glossary of sumo terms
- List of past sumo wrestlers
- List of sumo elders
