= 敏英 =

敏英 is an Asian given name.

It may refer to:

- Min-young, Korean given name
- Toshihide, Japanese given name
