= Takanosato Toshihide =

Japanese sumo wrestler

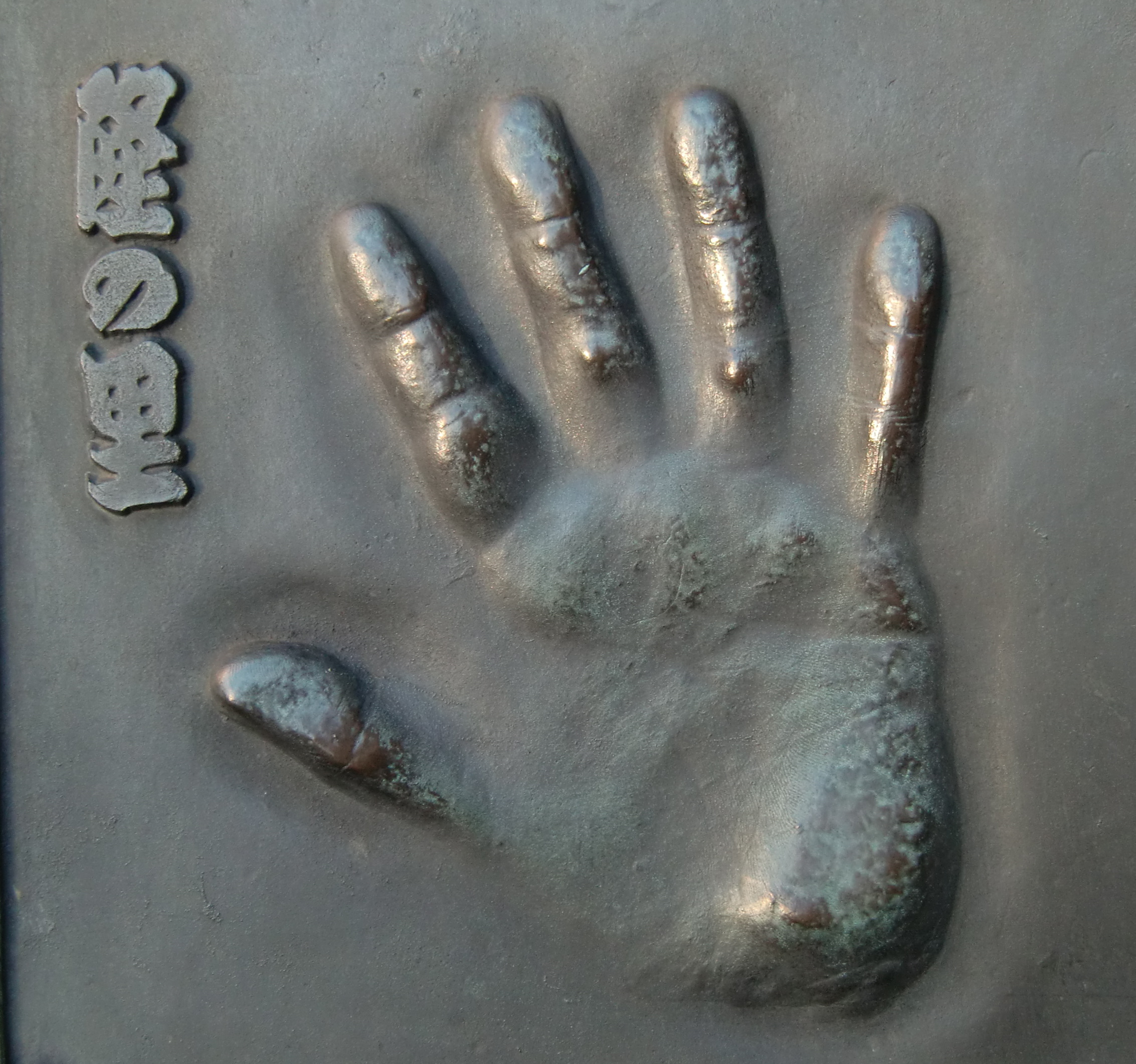
- Takanosato's handprint displayed on a monument in Ryōgoku, Tokyo

Personal information
- Native name: 隆の里 俊英
- Born: Toshihide Takaya; September 29, 1952 Namioka, Aomori, Japan
- Died: November 7, 2011 (aged 59) Fukuoka, Japan
- Height: 1.82 m (5 ft 11 1/2 in)
- Weight: 159 kg (351 lb)

Sport
- Sport: Sumo
- Retired: January 1986
- Heya: Futagoyama
- Record: 693–493–80
- Debut: July 1968
- Highest rank: Yokozuna (July 1983)
- Elder name: Naruto
- Championships: 4 (Makuuchi); 1 (Jūryō)
- Special Prizes: Outstanding Performance (2); Fighting Spirit (5)
- Gold Stars: 2 (Wajima, Kitanoumi)
- Updated on June 2020

Takanosato Toshihide (Japanese: 隆の里 俊英; September 29, 1952 – November 7, 2011), real name Toshihide Takaya (高谷 俊英), was a Japanese professional sumo wrestler from Namioka, Aomori. He was the sport's 59th yokozuna from 1983 to 1986 and won four top division tournament championships. After retirement he established Naruto stable which he ran from 1989 until his death.

== Early career ==
Takanosato played football and judo before turning to sumo. He was from the same area of Japan as Wakanohana Kanji II and the two entered professional sumo together in July 1968, joining Futagoyama stable. Takanosato reached the top makuuchi division in May 1975 but had some indifferent results and fell back to the jūryō division on several occasions. A late developer, he did not reach the san'yaku ranks until 1979, by which time Wakanohana was already a yokozuna. In 1980 he was runner-up in two consecutive tournaments. Nicknamed "Popeye" (ポパイ) because of his brawny physique, he was one of the few wrestlers in his day to use weight training, which is now commonplace in sumo. By 1981 he was a san'yaku regular, and in January 1982 he produced his third runner-up performance, this time at sekiwake, and earned promotion to ōzeki. Following his promotion he announced that he had been suffering from diabetes for many years, and had devised a special diet to keep the illness under control. He won his first top division championship in September 1982 with a perfect 15–0 record. He was runner-up in the March and May 1983 tournaments, and then took his second championship in July. Following this tournament, he was promoted to yokozuna.

== Yokozuna ==
Takanosato was almost thirty one years old when he reached sumo's highest rank, and the 91 tournaments it took him to reach yokozuna from his professional debut is the second slowest in sumo history, behind only Mienoumi. Most yokozuna struggle to perform well in the tournament immediately following their promotion, but Takanosato won it with a perfect record—the first yokozuna to do so since Futabayama in the 1930s. Although his yokozuna career was relatively short, he had a great rivalry with fellow yokozuna Chiyonofuji. In the four tournaments from July 1983 to January 1984, the two wrestlers came into the final day with the same score. This is a unique occurrence in sumo. It was Takanosato who won three out of the four tournament-deciding bouts, and he was one of the few wrestlers to have a winning record against Chiyonofuji. He studied Chiyonofuji's fighting style through watching videotapes of his bouts over and over, and was often able to keep his rival from getting his favoured left hand grip on his mawashi. Takanosato defeated Chiyonofuji eight times in a row from July 1981 to September 1982 and overall emerged victorious from 18 of their 31 encounters.

Takanosato's fourth tournament championship in January 1984 proved to be his last, and thereafter his yokozuna career was disappointing. He missed most of 1985 due to injury, only managing to complete one tournament, but did take part in the three day exhibition tournament held in the United States at Madison Square Garden in June. He announced his retirement in January 1986 at the age of 33.

== Retirement from sumo ==
Takanosato took the name Naruto upon joining the Sumo Association as an oyakata, or elder, and in 1989 opened his own Naruto stable in Matsudo, Chiba, which has produced several top division wrestlers. The first was Rikio in 1996 and he was followed by Wakanosato in 1998, Takanowaka in 1999, Takanotsuru in 2003, Kisenosato in 2004, and Takayasu and Takanoyama in 2011. It was a close-knit stable and Naruto Oyakata did not let his wrestlers go out and train at other stables (degeiko), believing that they did not need outside help. Naruto also worked as a judge of tournament bouts and for NHK as a sumo commentator.

== Death ==
In October 2011 the Sumo Association launched an investigation into allegations made by the news magazine Shūkan Shinchō that Naruto had beaten a former junior member of his stable with a block of wood and had injected Takanoyama with insulin so that the barely 100 kg wrestler would increase his appetite and put on weight. Both Naruto and Takanoyama were summoned for questioning by chairman Hanaregoma. Just days later, on November 7, 2011, Naruto died of respiratory failure in Fukuoka at the age of 59. At the end of the Kyushu tournament held later the same month, Kisenosato was promoted to ōzeki, something Naruto had always dreamed of seeing.

== Fighting style ==
Takanosato's most common winning kimarite or technique was overwhelmingly yorikiri or force out, which accounted for about 45 percent of his victories at sekitori level. He preferred a migi-yotsu grip (the same as Chiyonofuji), with his left hand outside and right hand inside his opponent's arms. He also regularly won by uwatenage (overarm throw) and tsuridashi (lift out), the latter a technique seldom seen today due to the increasing weight of wrestlers.

== Career record ==
Takanosato Toshihide
Year	January Hatsu basho, Tokyo	March Haru basho, Osaka	May Natsu basho, Tokyo	July Nagoya basho, Nagoya	September Aki basho, Tokyo	November Kyūshū basho, Fukuoka
1968	x	x	x	(Maezumo)	West Jonokuchi #10; 5–2	East Jonidan #43; 1–6
1969	East Jonidan #66; 4–3	West Jonidan #43; 4–3	West Jonidan #23; 3–4	West Jonidan #28; 2–5	West Jonidan #45; 6–1	West Sandanme #97; 4–3
1970	West Sandanme #81; 2–5	West Jonidan #6; 4–3	East Sandanme #75; 3–4	West Jonidan #2; 6–1	West Sandanme #50; 5–2	West Sandanme #22; 4–3
1971	West Sandanme #11; 3–4	East Sandanme #20; 4–3	East Sandanme #5; 6–1	East Makushita #34; 3–4	East Makushita #41; 4–3	West Makushita #36; 5–2
1972	East Makushita #23; 5–2	East Makushita #11; 2–5	East Makushita #26; 3–4	East Makushita #30; 3–4	West Makushita #38; 5–2	East Makushita #24; 4–3
1973	East Makushita #19; 6–1	West Makushita #3; 3–4	West Makushita #6; 4–3	East Makushita #5; 3–4	West Makushita #7; 3–4	West Makushita #12; 3–4
1974	West Makushita #19; 5–2	East Makushita #11; 4–3	West Makushita #7; 5–2	East Makushita #3; 4–3	West Makushita #1; 4–3	East Jūryō #13; 10–5–P
1975	East Jūryō #3; 8–7	East Jūryō #2; 10–5	West Maegashira #13; 7–8	West Maegashira #14; 6–9	East Jūryō #2; 3–12	East Jūryō #12; 8–7
1976	West Jūryō #8; 8–7	West Jūryō #6; 9–6	East Jūryō #2; 9–6	West Maegashira #12; 4–6–5	East Jūryō #5; 9–6	West Maegashira #12; 10–5
1977	West Maegashira #4; 8–7	West Komusubi #1; 4–11	West Maegashira #7; 7–8	East Maegashira #8; 8–7	East Maegashira #6; 5–10	West Maegashira #11; 11–4; F
1978	East Maegashira #4; 4–11	East Maegashira #10; 9–6	West Maegashira #4; 8–7	East Maegashira #1; 4–11	East Maegashira #8; 9–6	West Maegashira #3; 2–13
1979	West Maegashira #12; 5–10	East Jūryō #2; 11–4; Champion	East Maegashira #11; 10–5	West Maegashira #2; 8–7	West Sekiwake #1; 8–7	East Sekiwake #1; 6–9
1980	West Maegashira #1; 4–11	West Maegashira #7; 7–8	East Maegashira #9; 6–9	East Maegashira #12; 12–3; F	West Maegashira #1; 13–2; OF★★	West Sekiwake; 11–4; O
1981	West Sekiwake #1; 9–6	East Sekiwake #1; 10–5	East Sekiwake #1; 6–9	West Maegashira #1; 9–6	West Komusubi #2; 10–5	East Sekiwake #1; 11–4; F
1982	East Sekiwake #1; 12–3; F	West Ōzeki #1; 11–4	East Ōzeki #1; 11–4	East Ōzeki #1; 9–6	West Ōzeki #1; 15–0	East Ōzeki #1; 10–5
1983	East Ōzeki #1; 11–4	West Ōzeki #1; 12–3	East Ōzeki #1; 13–2	East Ōzeki #1; 14–1	West Yokozuna #1; 15–0	East Yokozuna #1; 13–2
1984	West Yokozuna #1; 13–2	East Yokozuna #1; 11–4	East Yokozuna #1; 11–4	West Yokozuna #1; 10–5	West Yokozuna #1; 10–5	East Yokozuna #1; 0–3–12
1985	East Yokozuna #2; 1–3–11	West Yokozuna #1; Sat out due to injury 0–0–15	West Yokozuna #1; Sat out due to injury 0–0–15	West Yokozuna #1; 10–5	West Yokozuna #1; 0–3–12	West Yokozuna #1; 1–4–10
1986	West Yokozuna #1; Retired; 0–2	x	x	x	x	x
Record given as wins–losses–absences Top division champion Top division runner-up Retired Lower divisions Non-participation Sanshō key: F=Fighting spirit; O=Outstanding performance; T=Technique Also shown: ★=Kinboshi; P=Playoff(s); Divisions: Makuuchi — Jūryō — Makushita — Sandanme — Jonidan — Jonokuchi Makuuchi ranks: Yokozuna — Ōzeki — Sekiwake — Komusubi — Maegashira

== See also ==
- Glossary of sumo terms
- List of sumo tournament top division champions
- List of sumo tournament top division runners-up
- List of sumo tournament second division champions
- List of past sumo wrestlers
- List of yokozuna

Preceded by Chiyonofuji Mitsugu	59th Yokozuna; 1983–1986	Succeeded by Futahaguro Kōji
Yokozuna is not a successive rank, and more than one wrestler can hold the title at once
