= Nishiiwa stable (2018) =

Organization of sumo wrestlers

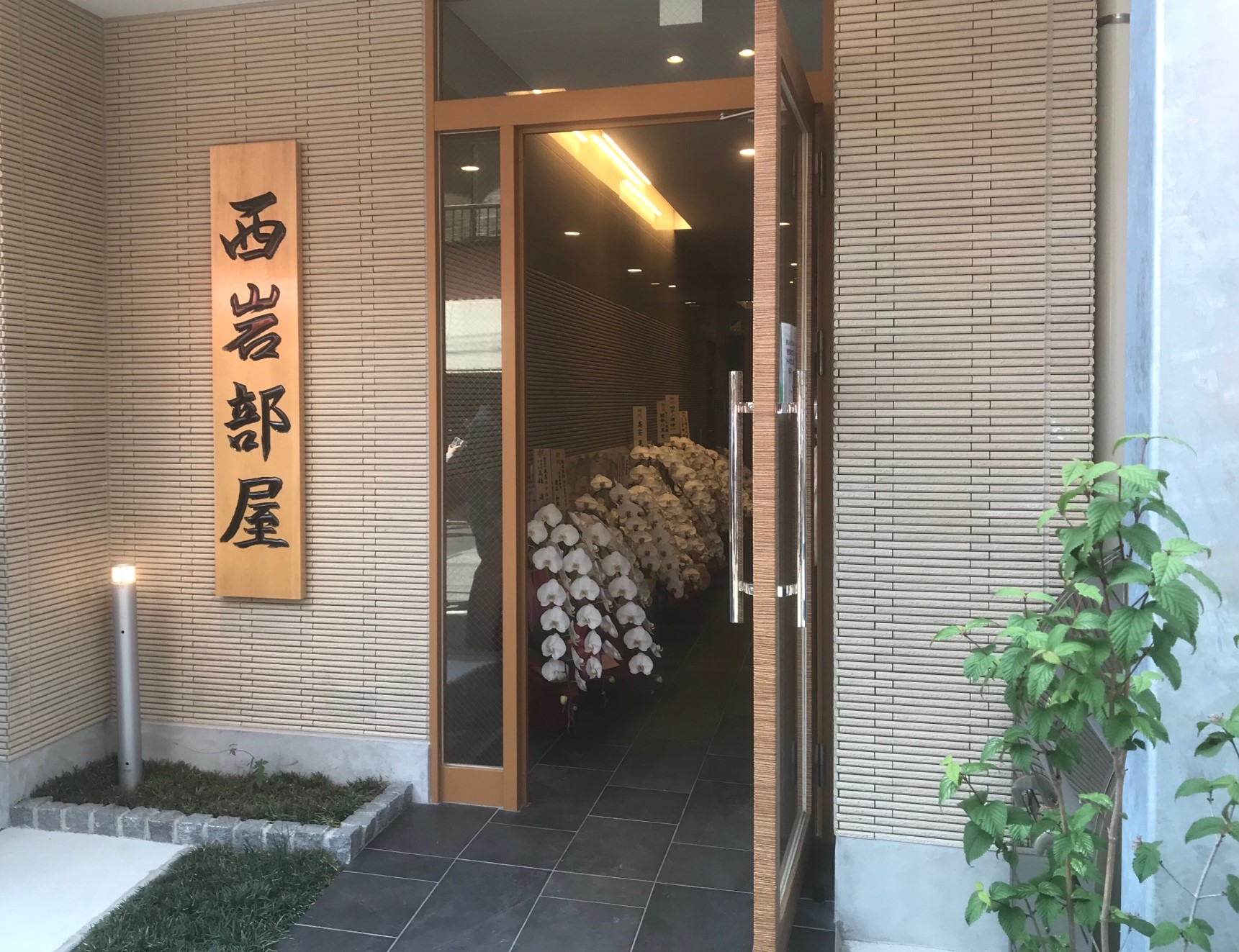

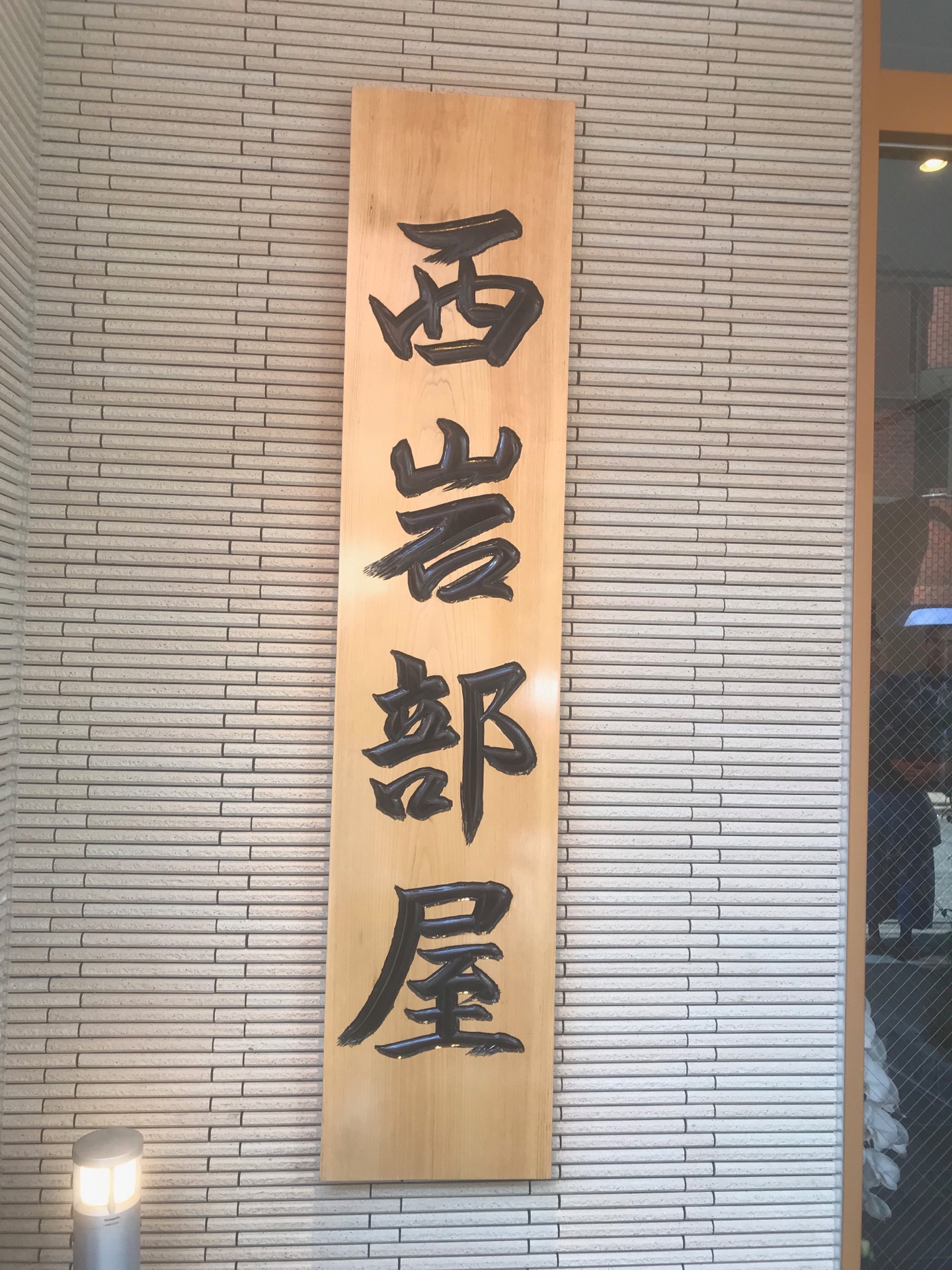

Nishiiwa stable (西岩部屋, Nishiiwa beya) is a heya of sumo wrestlers, part of the Nishonoseki ichimon or group of stables. It was established in February 2018 by the former sekiwake Wakanosato, who branched off from Tagonoura stable, taking two wrestlers from the jonidan division with him (Wakasatake and Wakanoguchi). The stable is situated in Asakusa, Tokyo. As of January 2023, it had nine wrestlers.

In 2024, the stable filed a lawsuit against the family of two of its wrestlers, responsible for messages on social networks posted since May 2024 blaming the stable's okamisan for moral harassment. Although a first lawsuit was initially withdrawn in August after apologies from family members, and wrestlers' testifiying that there were no problems in the stable, the situation also led to the premature retirement of one of the wrestlers and the distancing of the second from his family. In October, new comments implicating the master and okamisan in the wrestler's choice to distance himself from his family erupted again, with the stable again filing a lawsuit and deleting its X account (formerly Twitter) after a wave of online harassment.

== Ring name conventions ==
Wrestlers at this stable have taken ring names or shikona that begin with the character 若 (Waka), meaning young, followed by their surname; and later upon promotion to sandanme they will receive a ring name with the suffix 里 (read:Sato), meaning village, in deference to their coach and the stable's owner Wakanosato.

== Owners ==
- 2018–present: 12th Nishiiwa Shinobu (iin, sekiwake Wakanosato, born 1976)

== Notable active wrestlers ==
- None

== Referee ==
- Kimura Kazuma (makushita gyōji, real name Kazuma Okada, born 1994)

== Usher ==
- Hiroyuki (jūryō yobidashi, real name Hiroyuki Kon, born 1978)
- Masao (jūryō yobidashi, real name Noriyuki Otaka, born 1974)

== Hairdresser ==
- Tokonishi (fifth class tokoyama)

== Location and access ==
4 Chome-4-9 Kotobuki, Taitō, Tokyo 111-0042, Japan

- Toei Subway Asakusa Line: 3 minutes on foot from Asakusa Station A1 Exit
- Toei Subway Oedo Line: 3 minutes on foot from Kuramae station A 5 exit
- Tokyo Metro Ginza Line: 3 minutes walk from Tahara Town Station 2 Exit

== See also ==
- List of sumo stables
- List of active sumo wrestlers
- List of past sumo wrestlers
- Glossary of sumo terms
