= Lee Min-young =

Lee Min-young (Korean: 이민영) is a Korean name consisting of the family name Lee and the given name Min-young, and may refer to:

- Lee Min-young (actress) (born 1976), South Korean actress
- Min (South Korean singer) (born Lee Min-young, 1991), South Korean singer, member of miss A
