= Takanoyama Shuntarō =

Czech sumo wrestler

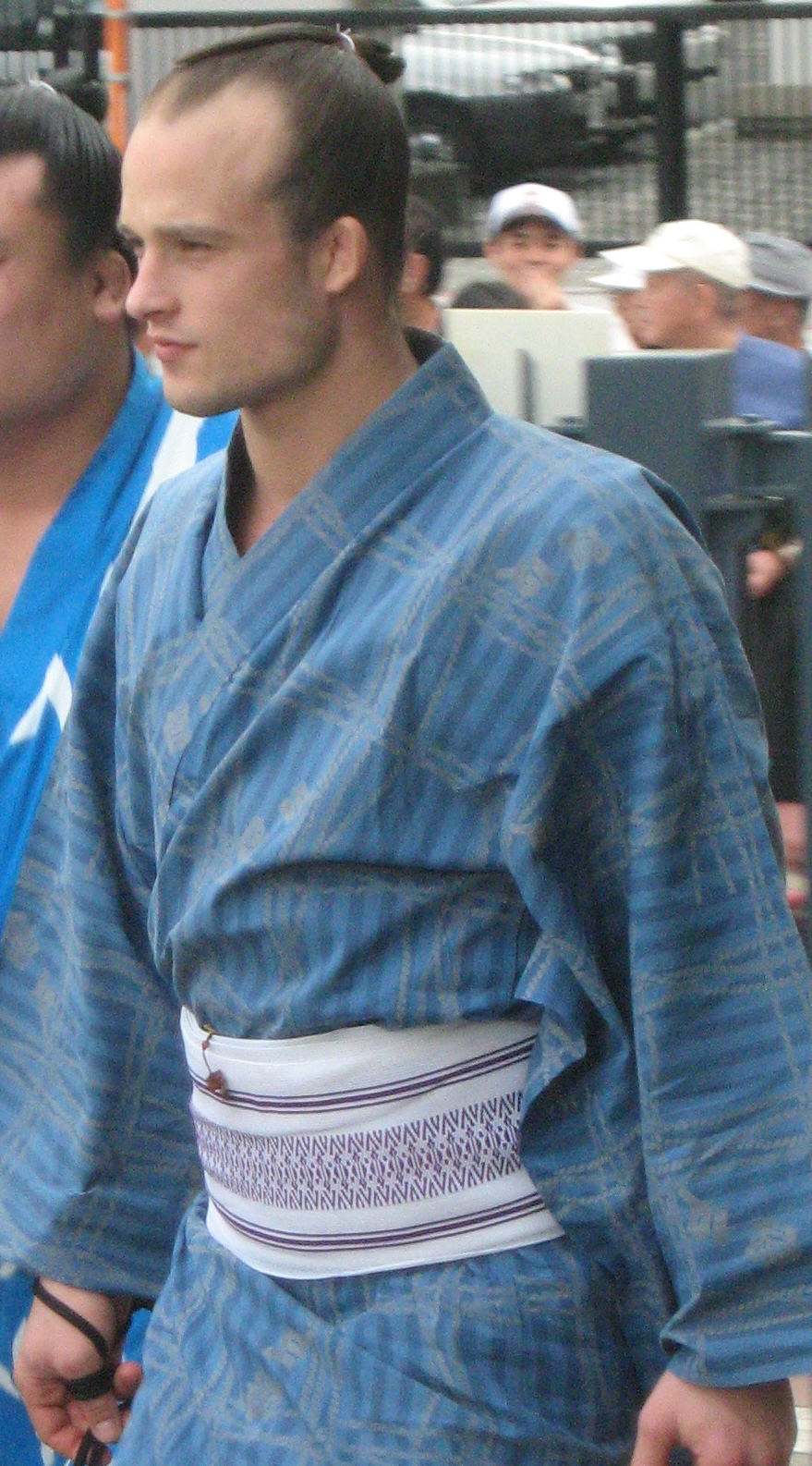
- Shuntarō in 2008

Personal information
- Native name: 隆の山俊太郎
- Born: Pavel Bojar; February 21, 1983 (age 43) Prague, Czechoslovakia
- Height: 1.85 m (6 ft 1 in)
- Weight: 98 kg (216 lb; 15.4 st)

Sport
- Sport: Sumo
- Retired: July, 2014
- Heya: Naruto
- Record: 325-318-10
- Debut: November, 2001
- Highest rank: Maegashira 12 (July, 2012)
- Updated on July 24, 2014

Takanoyama Shuntarō (born 21 February 1983 as Pavel Bojar) is a former sumo wrestler from Prague, Czech Republic. He is the first man from the Czech Republic to join the professional sport in Japan. He reached the third highest makushita division in 2004, but due to his light weight, he had difficulty in regularly beating his opponents, despite the skills he developed from his background in judo. However, in May 2011, he finally earned promotion to the sekitori ranks. After becoming only the third new sekitori since 1958 to pass through jūryō division in just one tournament, he made his debut in the top makuuchi division in September 2011. He retired on 24 July 2014.

== Early life and sumo background ==
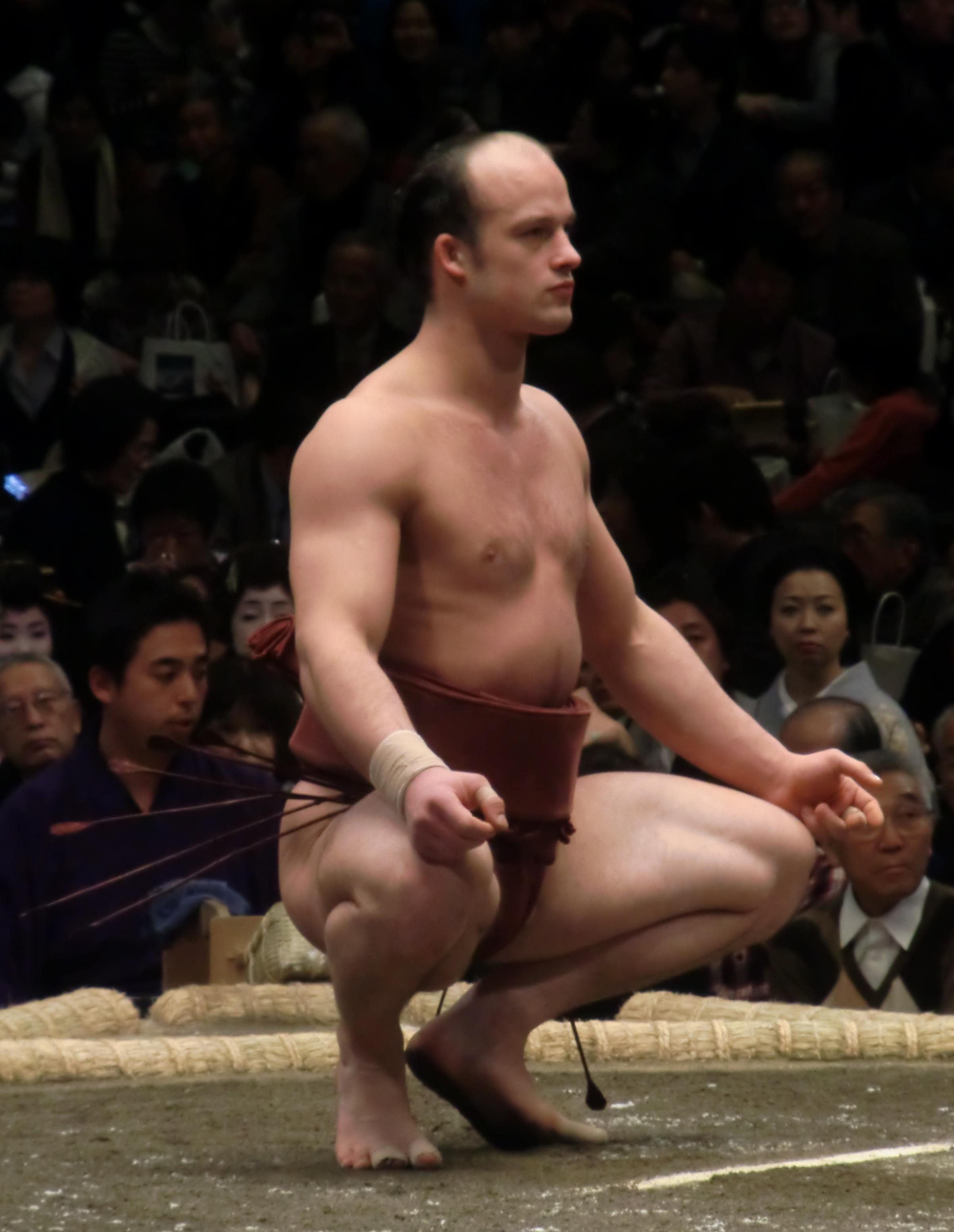
In 2012

Bojar practised judo in the Czech Republic before becoming interested in sumo. Sumo is more popular in the Czech Republic than in any other European country, with ten sumo clubs containing some 600 members, and he was trained by Jaroslav Poříz, president of the Czech Sumo Association. After winning the bronze medal in the 2000 Junior World Sumo Championships in Tokyo, he was accepted by Naruto stable, a heya in Chiba run by former yokozuna Takanosato. After passing the physical exam, he made his official debut in November 2001.

== Professional career ==
He was given the shikona of Takanoyama, meaning "noble mountain". He reached the sandanme division in January 2003, and the third highest makushita division in March 2004. He fell back to sandanme after only two tournaments but returned to makushita in March 2005 and largely remained there for the next six years, unable to break through to the elite sekitori ranks.

Takanoyama was hampered mostly by an inability to put on weight. His height of 1.85 m (6 ft 1 in) and weight of 90 kg (200 lb; 14 st) make him among the lightest sumo wrestlers in the modern era. In November 2008 he climbed as high as makushita 13, beating his previous high of makushita 15 set in November 2005, and he moved up to makushita 9 in January 2009. After compiling a 5–2 record in the July tournament, which included a win over the former maegashira Ryūhō, he reached a new highest rank of makushita 4 in September 2009. He produced another good score of 5–2 in May 2010 from makushita 6, which included wins over Jūmonji and Hōchiyama. In January 2011 a 6–1 score saw him promoted to a new highest rank of makushita 2 for the May "technical examination tournament". There he scored 5–2, guaranteeing promotion to the jūryō division for July. When the banzuke was released on June 27, Takanoyama was at No. 5 West, the tenth highest rank in the 26 man division. It took him 57 tournaments from his professional debut to reach jūryō, the second slowest among foreign born wrestlers after the Brazilian Wakaazuma at the time.

He had a successful jūryō debut, winning seven of his first eight bouts and finishing on 10–5. This earned him immediate promotion to the top makuuchi division for the September 2011, only the third time since the six tournaments a year system was established in 1958 that a jūryō debutant has achieved this (the other two were Daikiko and Ichihara). Weighing in before the tournament at just 98 kg (216 lb; 15.4 st), he was the first wrestler under 100 kilos in the top division since Mainoumi in 1997.

Takanoyama had a difficult start to his makuuchi career, losing his first five matches and then only winning the sixth when his opponent inadvertently stepped out of the ring first (isamiashi). However, he picked up a legitimate win on Day 7, downing the 166 kg (366 lb; 26.1 st) Yoshiazuma with a hooking inner thigh throw (kakenage) and instantly becoming a favourite with the tournament crowd. He finished on 5–10, which sent him back to jūryō in November, but he responded with a 9–6 record which returned him immediately to the top division for the January 2012 tournament. He was unable to produce a kachi-koshi score in either January or March, but in the May tournament he managed an 11–4 record in jūryō which earned him a second place and a return to the makuuchi division in the July tournament. However he had yet to earn a winning record in five tournaments in makuuchi and was demoted to jūryō once again for November. His 7–8 record in July 2013 was his seventh consecutive losing score, pushing him towards the bottom of the jūryō division. In September 2013, he finished on 5–10, his weakest performance in jūryō so far, which sent him back to makushita 2 for the November tournament. Afterwards, he skirted the border between the two divisions, being relegated twice and promoted twice.

== Retirement from sumo ==
Takanoyama announced his retirement on Day 12 of the July 2014 tournament, where he had withdrawn after losing his first match, guaranteeing a large fall down the makushita division. He said, "I mount the dohyo to win, and I can no longer win." He indicated that he would return to the Czech Republic with his family, and try to make use of his Japanese language skills. Takanoyama's danpatsu-shiki or retirement ceremony was held at his stable on 7 September 2014.

== Fighting style ==
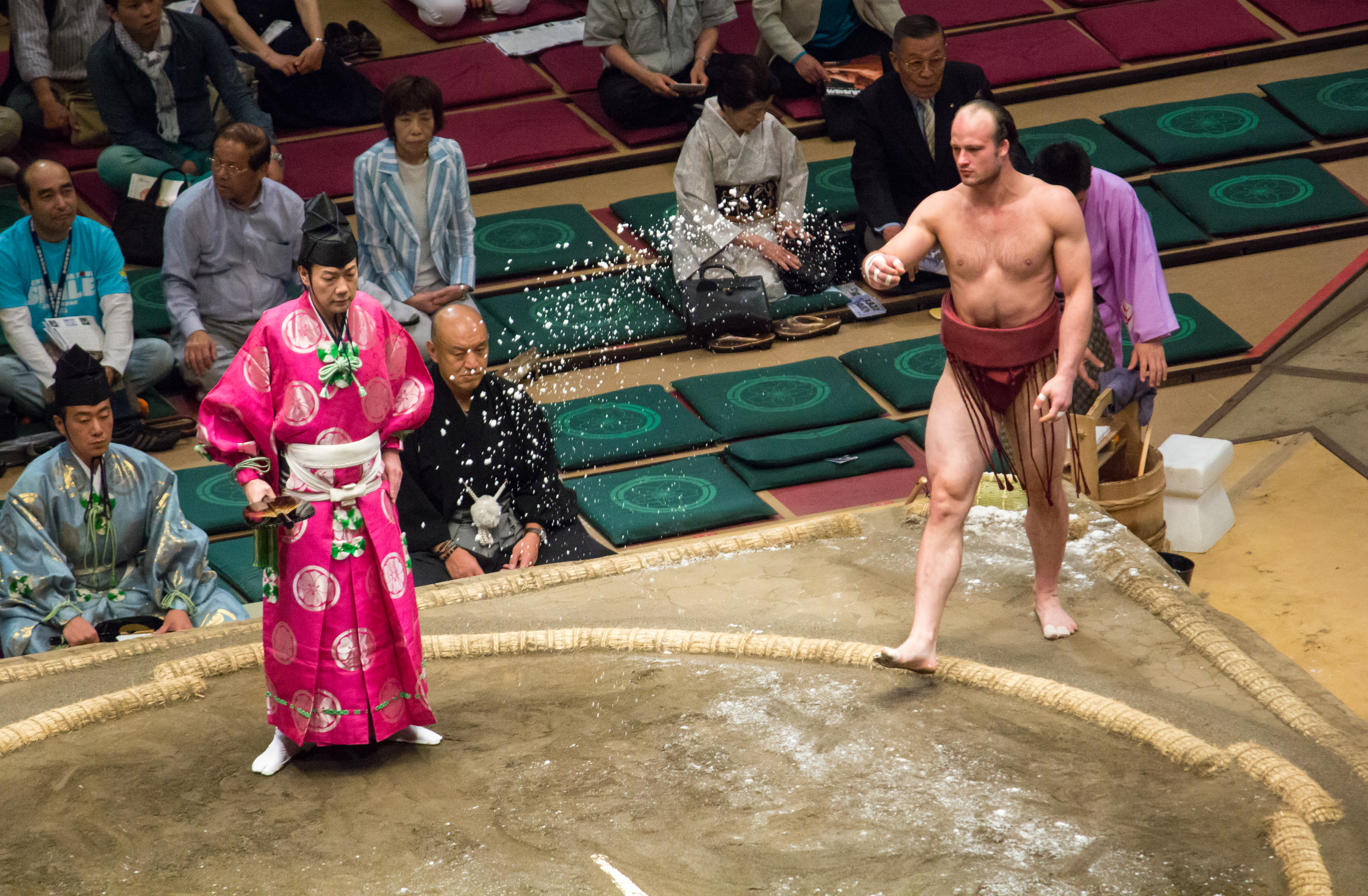
Takanoyama during the May 2014 tournament

Due to his exceptionally light frame, Takanoyama relied heavily on throws to defeat his much heavier opponents. His most common winning kimarite was uwatenage, or overarm throw, followed by shitatenage (underarm throw) and kakenage (hooking inner thigh throw). He had knowledge of a wide variety of techniques, using at least 37 different winning kimarite in his career.

== Personal life ==
In an effort to improve his understanding of Japanese culture, Takanoyama devoted his spare time to watching historical dramas and reading manga. After reaching jūryō, he returned to the Czech Republic in the summer of 2011 for the first time since leaving ten years earlier.

After the September 2011 tournament, he announced his engagement to a 32-year-old domestic helper from Chiba Prefecture. The couple's first child, a girl, was born in May.

Takanoyama became a sekitori at around the same time as temporarily breaking through the 100 kg barrier, and attributed his gain in weight to the Naruto Oyakata and the stablemaster's wife giving him special dishes and snacks at night. However, in November 2011, he was given a warning by the Sumo Association for injecting himself with insulin that had been prescribed by his stablemaster.

== Career record ==
Takanoyama Shuntarō
Year	January Hatsu basho, Tokyo	March Haru basho, Osaka	May Natsu basho, Tokyo	July Nagoya basho, Nagoya	September Aki basho, Tokyo	November Kyūshū basho, Fukuoka
2001	x	x	x	x	x	(Maezumo)
2002	West Jonokuchi #29; 5–2	East Jonidan #92; 5–2	East Jonidan #47; 2–5	East Jonidan #75; 6–1	East Jonidan #6; 3–4	West Jonidan #19; 5–2
2003	West Sandanme #83; 3–4	East Jonidan #2; 5–2	East Sandanme #71; 4–3	East Sandanme #54; 3–4	East Sandanme #71; 6–1	East Sandanme #16; 1–6
2004	East Sandanme #46; 6–1	West Makushita #56; 4–3	East Makushita #48; 2–5	West Sandanme #9; 3–4	East Sandanme #28; 4–3	West Sandanme #14; 3–4
2005	West Sandanme #28; 6–1	West Makushita #47; 5–2	East Makushita #35; 4–3	East Makushita #25; 4–3	West Makushita #17; 4–3	East Makushita #15; 2–5
2006	West Makushita #29; 3–4	East Makushita #35; 4–3	West Makushita #27; 2–5	East Makushita #45; 5–2	West Makushita #29; 3–4	West Makushita #36; 4–3
2007	West Makushita #27; 2–5	West Makushita #49; 3–4	East Sandanme #3; 6–1	West Makushita #30; 2–5	East Makushita #46; 0–2–5	East Sandanme #22; 4–3
2008	West Sandanme #8; 5–2	West Makushita #48; 3–4	East Sandanme #1; 5–2	East Makushita #41; 5–2	West Makushita #28; 5–2	West Makushita #13; 4–3
2009	West Makushita #9; 3–4	West Makushita #13; 3–4	East Makushita #20; 5–2	West Makushita #11; 5–2	West Makushita #4; 3–4	East Makushita #10; 4–3
2010	West Makushita #6; 3–4	East Makushita #10; 4–3	East Makushita #6; 5–2	East Makushita #3; 1–6	East Makushita #20; 4–3	West Makushita #14; 4–3
2011	West Makushita #10; 6–1	East Makushita #2; Tournament Cancelled; Match fixing investigation 0–0–0	East Makushita #2; 5–2	West Jūryō #5; 10–5	West Maegashira #15; 5–10	West Jūryō #3; 9–6
2012	East Maegashira #14; 6–9	West Maegashira #16; 4–11	East Jūryō #4; 11–4	West Maegashira #12; 5–10	East Maegashira #16; 6–9	East Jūryō #4; 7–8
2013	East Jūryō #5; 6–9	West Jūryō #8; 6–9	West Jūryō #10; 7–8	West Jūryō #11; 7–8	West Jūryō #12; 5–10	West Makushita #2; 4–3
2014	West Jūryō #12; 4–11	East Makushita #3; 4–3	West Jūryō #14; 4–11	West Makushita #6; Retired; 0–2–4	x	x
Record given as wins–losses–absences Top division champion Top division runner-up Retired Lower divisions Non-participation Sanshō key: F=Fighting spirit; O=Outstanding performance; T=Technique Also shown: ★=Kinboshi; P=Playoff(s); Divisions: Makuuchi — Jūryō — Makushita — Sandanme — Jonidan — Jonokuchi Makuuchi ranks: Yokozuna — Ōzeki — Sekiwake — Komusubi — Maegashira

== See also ==
- Glossary of sumo terms
- List of non-Japanese sumo wrestlers
- List of past sumo wrestlers
