= Toshihide =

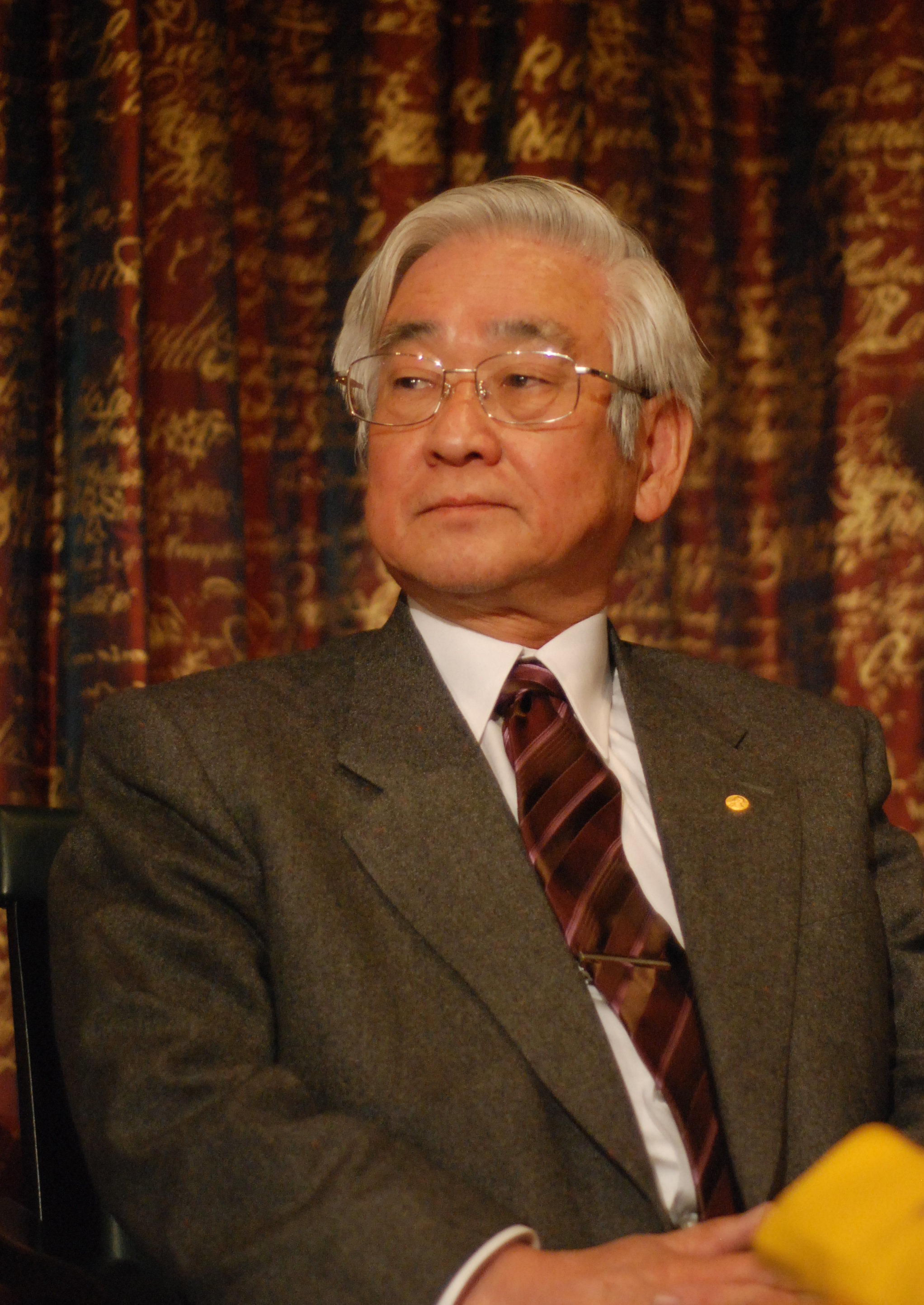
- Toshihide Masukawa. Japanese theoretical physicist.
- Pronunciation: toɕiçide (IPA)
- Gender: Male

Origin
- Origin: Japanese
- Meaning: Different meanings depending on the kanji used

Other names
- Alternative spelling: Tosihide (Kunrei-shiki) Tosihide (Nihon-shiki) Toshihide (Hepburn)

Toshihide is a masculine Japanese given name.

== Written forms ==
Toshihide can be written using different combinations of kanji characters. Here are some examples:

- 敏英, "agile, hero"
- 敏秀, "agile, excellence"
- 敏栄, "agile, prosperous"
- 俊英, "talented, hero"
- 俊秀, "talented, excellence"
- 俊栄, "talented, prosperous"
- 寿英, "long life, hero"
- 寿秀, "long life, excellence"
- 寿栄, "long life, prosperous"
- 寿日出, "long life, sunrise"
- 利英, "benefit, hero"
- 利秀, "benefit, excellence"
- 年英, "year, hero"
- 年日出, "year, sunrise"
- 年栄, "year, prosperous"

The name can also be written in hiragana としひで or katakana トシヒデ.

== Notable people with the name ==
- Toshihide Iguchi (井口 俊英; born 1951), Japanese rogue trader
- Toshihide Masukawa (益川 敏英; 1940–2021), Japanese theoretical physicist
- Toshihide Matsui (松井 俊英; born 1978), Japanese tennis player
- Toshihide Migita (右田 年英; 1862–1925), Japanese ukiyo-e artist
- Toshihide Muraoka (村岡敏英; born 1960), Japanese politician
- Toshihide Saito (斉藤 俊秀; born 1973), Japanese footballer
- Takanosato Toshihide (隆の里 俊英; 1952–2011), Japanese sumo wrestler
- Tomoefuji Toshihide (巴富士 俊英; born 1971), Japanese sumo wrestler
- Toshihide Wakamatsu (若松 俊秀; born 1965), Japanese actor
