= Takanowaka Yūki =

Japanese sumo wrestler (born 1976)

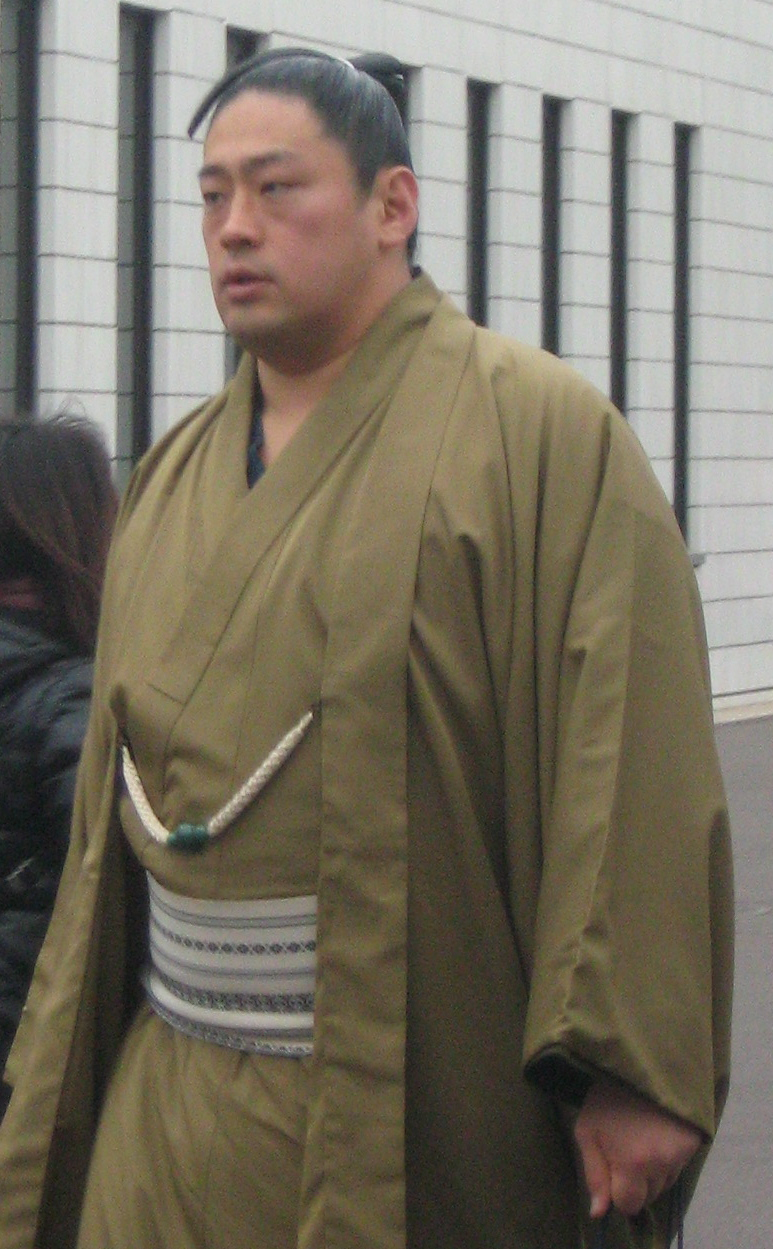

Personal information
- Native name: 隆乃若 勇紀
- Born: Yūki Ozaki; 2 April 1976 (age 50) Nagasaki, Japan
- Height: 1.90 m (6 ft 3 in)
- Weight: 149 kg (328 lb)

Sport
- Sport: Sumo
- Retired: September, 2007
- Heya: Naruto
- Record: 505–470–66
- Debut: March 1992
- Highest rank: Sekiwake (January 2003)
- Championships: 1 (Jūryō); 1 (Makushita)
- Special Prizes: Fighting Spirit (3)
- Gold Stars: 1 (Musashimaru)
- Updated on September 2007

Takanowaka Yūki (born 2 April 1976 as Yūki Ozaki) is a former sumo wrestler from Ikitsuki, Nagasaki, Japan. His highest rank was sekiwake.

== Career ==
Takanowaka was born as Yūki Ozaki, the son of a professional baseball player. In his youth he played not only baseball but also basketball, for which he was offered several scholarships. He tried sumo at the suggestion of his school's sumo club manager, who had connections with Naruto stable. Takanowaka joined the stable in March 1992, making his debut alongside future sekiwake Wakanosato. As is common, he initially fought under his own surname, soon switching to "Takaozaki" before adopting the fighting name of Takanowaka in 1998. Initially weighing only 80 kg (180 lb), it took him several years to work his way through the lower ranks. He was promoted to the second highest jūryō division in May 1999 and reached the top makuuchi division just three tournaments later in November 1999.

Takanowaka was ranked in the top division for 34 tournaments in total, with a win-loss rate of 229–242, with 39 absences. He earned one kinboshi, or gold star, by defeating yokozuna Musashimaru in May 2001, and three special prizes. His best performance was probably in November 2002 when produced a strong 11–4 record at komusubi rank and won his third Fighting Spirit prize. He was promoted to sekiwake in January 2003 and held his rank with a good 9–6 score but missed the whole of the March 2003 tournament with an injury picked up on the last day of the previous basho. As a result, he was demoted to jūryō and although he quickly returned to the top division he never managed to reach the titled san'yaku ranks again. After suffering from torn cartilage in his knees his results took a downward turn. He was demoted to jūryō once again in January 2006 and the unsalaried makushita division in July 2007.

== Retirement from sumo ==
On 22 September 2007 Takanowaka announced his retirement from sumo, after withdrawing from the September tournament with four losses at the rank of makushita 2. His official retirement ceremony took place on 16 February 2008 at the Ryōgoku Kokugikan. He did not stay with the Sumo Association as an elder, and left the sumo world completely. He opened a chanko restaurant in Hirado city.

He was married in February 2013.

== Fighting style ==
Takanowakas favoured kimarite or techniques were hidari-yotsu (a right hand outside, left hand inside grip on the opponent's mawashi or belt), uwatenage (overarm throw) and yorikiri (force out).

== Career record ==
Takanowaka Yūki
Year	January Hatsu basho, Tokyo	March Haru basho, Osaka	May Natsu basho, Tokyo	July Nagoya basho, Nagoya	September Aki basho, Tokyo	November Kyūshū basho, Fukuoka
1992	x	(Maezumo)	West Jonokuchi #16; 5–2	East Jonidan #102; 4–3	East Jonidan #75; 5–2	East Jonidan #34; 1–6
1993	West Jonidan #80; 1–0–6	East Jonidan #128; 1–0–6	West Jonidan #164; 5–2	East Jonidan #109; 5–2	East Jonidan #66; 4–3	West Jonidan #40; 4–3
1994	West Jonidan #22; 6–1	West Sandanme #64; 3–4	East Sandanme #83; 6–1	East Sandanme #30; 2–5	East Sandanme #59; 4–3	East Sandanme #43; 5–2
1995	East Sandanme #15; 3–4	West Sandanme #27; 4–3	East Sandanme #15; 5–2	West Makushita #50; 2–5	East Sandanme #13; 6–1	East Makushita #41; 4–3
1996	East Makushita #32; 4–3	West Makushita #23; 2–5	West Makushita #45; 3–4	East Makushita #60; 6–1–PP	East Makushita #31; 1–6	East Makushita #59; 7–0; Champion
1997	West Makushita #7; 3–4	West Makushita #14; 4–3	West Makushita #7; 3–4	East Makushita #14; 4–3	West Makushita #8; 4–3	West Makushita #5; 2–5
1998	West Makushita #18; 4–3	West Makushita #11; 6–1	East Makushita #3; 3–4	East Makushita #7; 2–5	East Makushita #21; 4–3	West Makushita #15; 5–2
1999	East Makushita #6; 6–1	East Makushita #1; 5–2	West Jūryō #11; 9–6	West Jūryō #7; 8–7	East Jūryō #5; 11–4	West Maegashira #14; 9–6
2000	East Maegashira #12; 10–5; F	West Maegashira #4; 5–10	East Maegashira #7; 8–7	West Maegashira #2; 6–9	West Maegashira #5; 5–10	West Maegashira #8; 11–4
2001	East Komusubi #1; 4–11	West Maegashira #4; 8–7	West Maegashira #1; 5–10 ★	West Maegashira #5; 9–6	West Maegashira #2; 8–7	East Maegashira #2; 6–9
2002	East Maegashira #5; 3–4–8	West Maegashira #11; 11–4; F	West Maegashira #3; 7–8	East Maegashira #4; 7–8	West Maegashira #4; 8–7	West Komusubi #1; 11–4; F
2003	East Sekiwake #1; 9–6	East Sekiwake #1; Sat out due to injury 0–0–15	West Maegashira #6; 0–2–13	East Jūryō #3; Sat out due to injury 0–0–15	East Jūryō #3; 12–3	West Maegashira #12; 7–8
2004	West Maegashira #13; 4–11	East Jūryō #5; 10–5	West Maegashira #16; 8–7	West Maegashira #13; 8–7	West Maegashira #12; 8–7	East Maegashira #12; 8–7
2005	East Maegashira #9; 6–9	East Maegashira #12; 7–8	East Maegashira #13; 5–10	West Maegashira #17; 8–7	East Maegashira #15; 9–6	West Maegashira #10; 1–11–3
2006	East Jūryō #5; 6–9	West Jūryō #7; 7–8	East Jūryō #8; 5–10	East Jūryō #14; 9–6	East Jūryō #8; 11–4–P; Champion	East Jūryō #2; 5–10
2007	East Jūryō #6; 8–7	West Jūryō #2; 4–11	East Jūryō #9; 4–11	West Makushita #3; 4–3	West Makushita #2; Retired; 0–4–3	x
Record given as wins–losses–absences Top division champion Top division runner-up Retired Lower divisions Non-participation Sanshō key: F=Fighting spirit; O=Outstanding performance; T=Technique Also shown: ★=Kinboshi; P=Playoff(s); Divisions: Makuuchi — Jūryō — Makushita — Sandanme — Jonidan — Jonokuchi Makuuchi ranks: Yokozuna — Ōzeki — Sekiwake — Komusubi — Maegashira

== See also ==
- List of sumo tournament top division runners-up
- List of sumo tournament second division champions
- Glossary of sumo terms
- List of past sumo wrestlers
- List of sekiwake
