= Takayasu Akira =

Japanese sumo wrestler (born 1990)

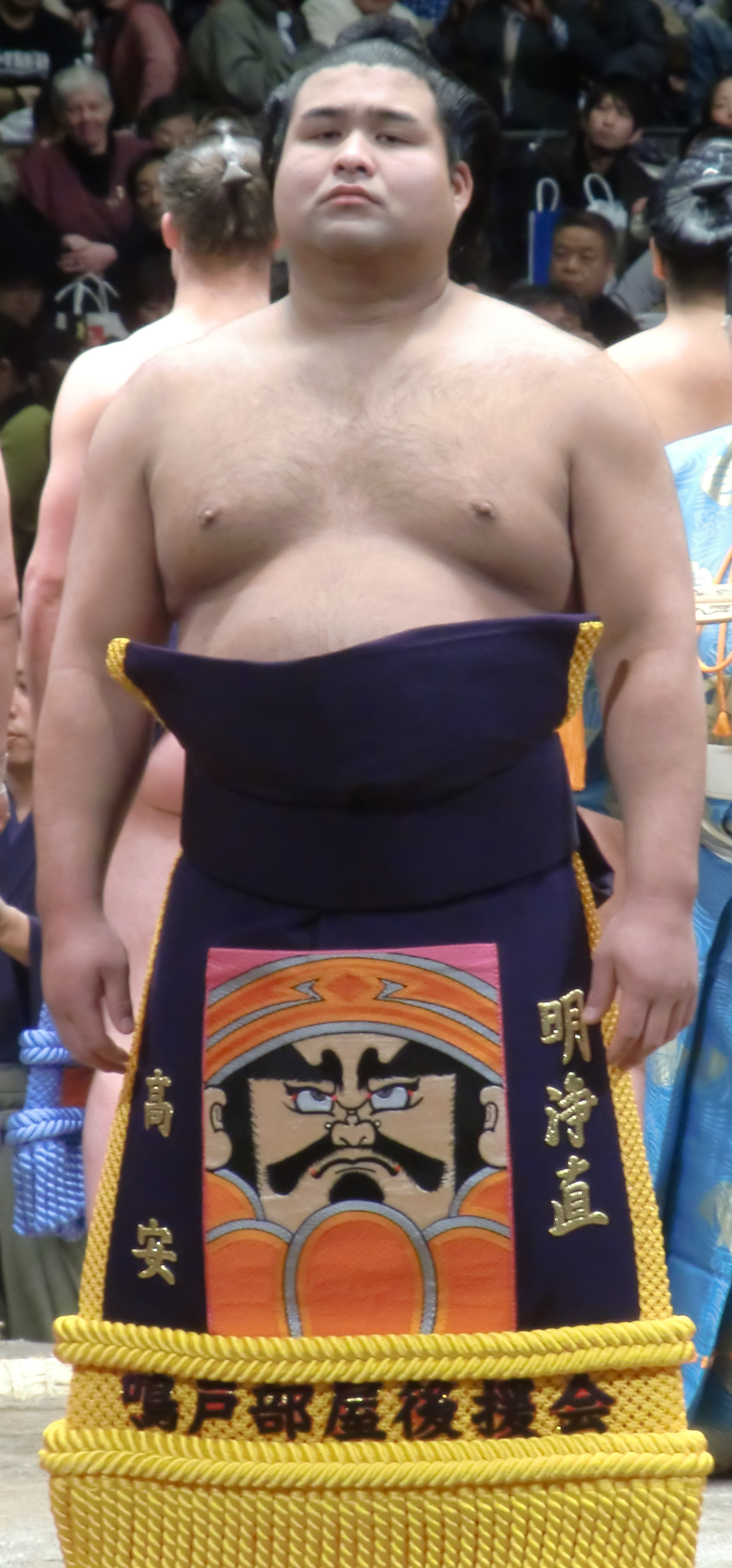
- Takayasu in 2012

Personal information
- Native name: 髙安 晃
- Born: Akira Takayasu; February 28, 1990 (age 36) Tsuchiura, Ibaraki, Japan
- Height: 1.88 m (6 ft 2 in)
- Weight: 173 kg (381 lb; 27.2 st)
- Website: http://tagonoura.jp/Tagonoura stable

Sport
- Sport: Sumo
- Rank: see below
- Heya: Tagonoura
- Debut: March 2005
- Highest rank: Ōzeki (July 2017)
- Championships: 1 (Makushita)
- Special Prizes: Fighting Spirit (7); Outstanding Performance (4); Technique (3)
- Gold Stars: (7); Harumafuji (3); Hakuhō; Terunofuji; Hōshōryū; Ōnosato
- Updated on September 16, 2026

Takayasu Akira (髙安 晃; born February 28, 1990 in Tsuchiura) is a Japanese professional sumo wrestler. He made his professional debut in 2005 and reached the top makuuchi division in 2011, the first wrestler born in the Heisei era to do so. His highest rank has been ōzeki. He wrestles for Tagonoura stable. He has been runner-up in a tournament nine times - the most of any wrestler who has not won a championship. He has earned fourteen special prizes: seven for Fighting Spirit, four for Outstanding Performance and three for Technique. He has also won seven gold stars for defeating yokozuna. After achieving 34 wins in the three tournaments from January to May 2017, he was officially promoted to ōzeki on May 31, 2017. He maintained the rank for a total of 15 tournaments.

== Early life and sumo background ==
Takayasu was born in Tsuchiura, Ibaraki to Eiji Takayasu and Bebelita Bernadas. His father is from Ibaraki Prefecture and his mother is from the island of Bohol in the Philippines. He has a brother, Hiroyuki, who is five years his senior. His cousin is Satochi, former drummer of the rock band Mucc. Takayasu was a catcher on his junior high school baseball team and expected to play for his high school club as well, but his father encouraged him to take up sumo, having noticed his physical resemblance to fellow Ibaraki native and sumo wrestler Kisenosato. Through his father's recommendation he joined Kisenosato's Naruto stable (now Tagonoura stable) upon graduating from junior high school. Takayasu ran away from the stable several times due to the severe training, but on each occasion his father persuaded him to return.

== Career ==
=== Early career ===
On his entry to Naruto stable, he was already 180 centimeters tall and weighed 120 kilograms, and consequently had much expectation pinned on him from the start. His first tournament was in March, 2005. He made steady progress through the lower divisions, with only a few losing record or make-koshi tournaments. He won the yūshō or championship in the third makushita division in September, 2010 with a perfect 7–0 record. This propelled him into jūryō division, where along with Masunoyama became one of the first two sekitori to be born in the Heisei era. He decided against adopting a traditional shikona despite reaching the elite and has continued to use his birth name. In his first jūryō tournament in November he almost pulled off a second consecutive championship, losing to Toyohibiki in a playoff after both finished with 11–4 records.

=== Makuuchi career ===
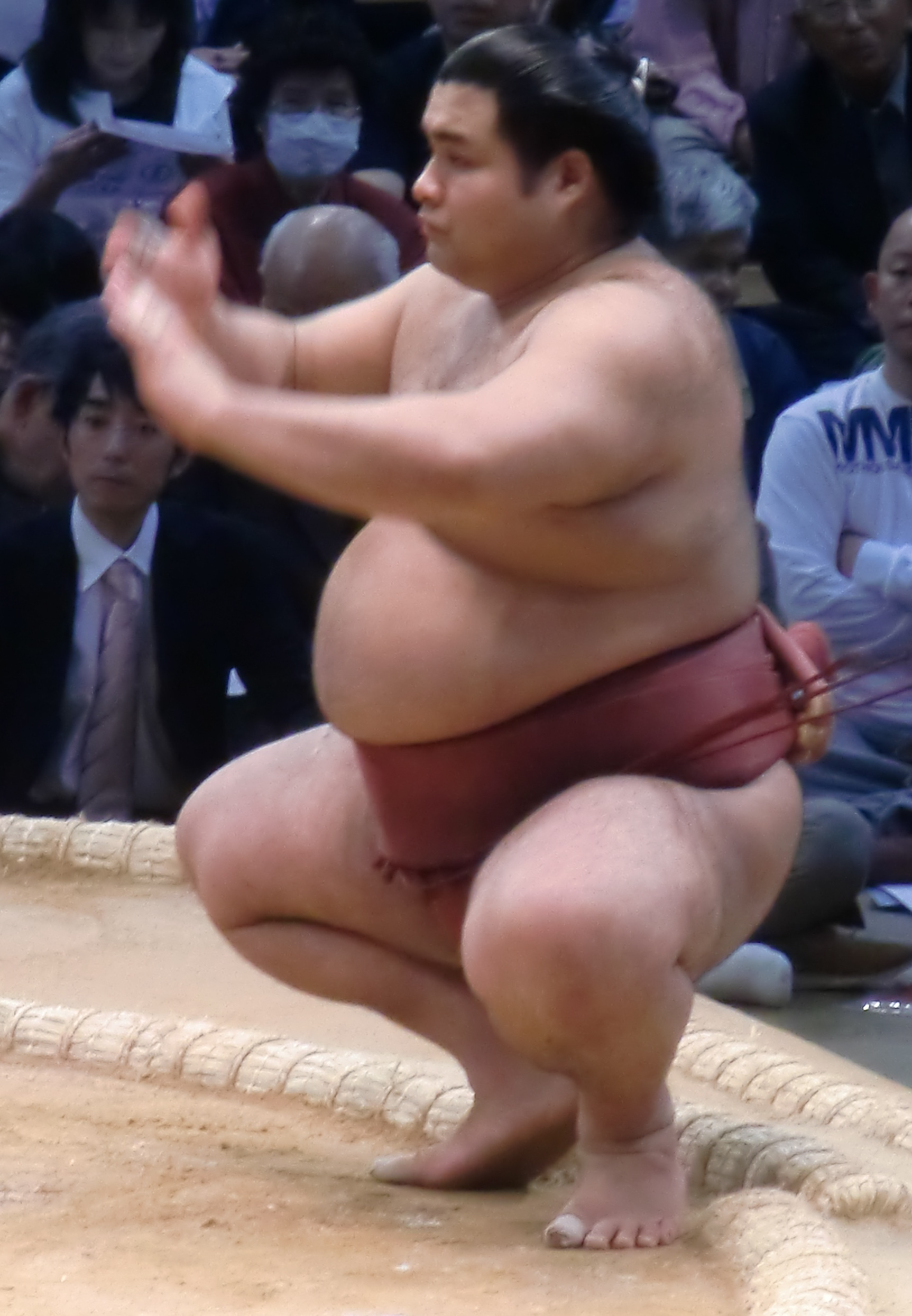
Takayasu in November 2011

After two more strong performances at jūryō Takayasu was promoted to the top makuuchi division in July, 2011. His debut record of 9–6 at maegashira 11 earned him a maegashira rank of no. 6 in the following tournament, then his highest, but he only managed a 6–9 record there. After a 9–6 score in the November 2011 tournament he was promoted to a new high of maegashira 3. He scored only 6–9 in the January 2012 tourney, but a 10–5 record in March saw him reach maegashira 1 in the May tournament.

Takayasu had his best result in the top division up to that point in the January 2013 tournament, finishing runner up on 12–3 and winning his first sanshō award for Fighting Spirit. He had two gold star wins in 2013, in two different tournaments, both at maegashira 1, and both against Harumafuji. The second win against Harumafuji also helped him procure his first Outstanding Performance prize, and his first promotion to the san'yaku ranks at komusubi. He only lasted one tournament at this rank however, and went into a bit of a slump before bouncing back with an 11–4 at the July 2014 tournament. In the November 2014 tournament he scored against top-ranked competition, earning two gold stars for defeating Harumafuji and Hakuhō and receiving the Outstanding Performance prize. This saw him promoted to komusubi once more at the beginning of 2015, but he once again fell short with a 6–9 record.

He had to withdraw from a tournament for the first time in his career in September 2015, but recovered with two winning records in the next two tournaments. After a poor performance in March 2016, a 9–6 result in May saw him promoted to komusubi for the third time. At Nagoya in July he produced his first winning record at a san'yaku rank with eleven wins, beating the ōzeki Kotoshōgiku, Goeido and Terunofuji and being awarded the Special Prize for Technique. September saw him at sekiwake for the first time and he was in contention for the championship at 10–2 after twelve days, although he had a somewhat disappointing end to the tournament losing his last three bouts to maegashira ranked wrestlers. However, he was awarded his third Fighting Spirit Prize. His performance fueled speculation about a potential promotion to ōzeki but he failed to maintain his momentum in November, ending with a 7–8 record.

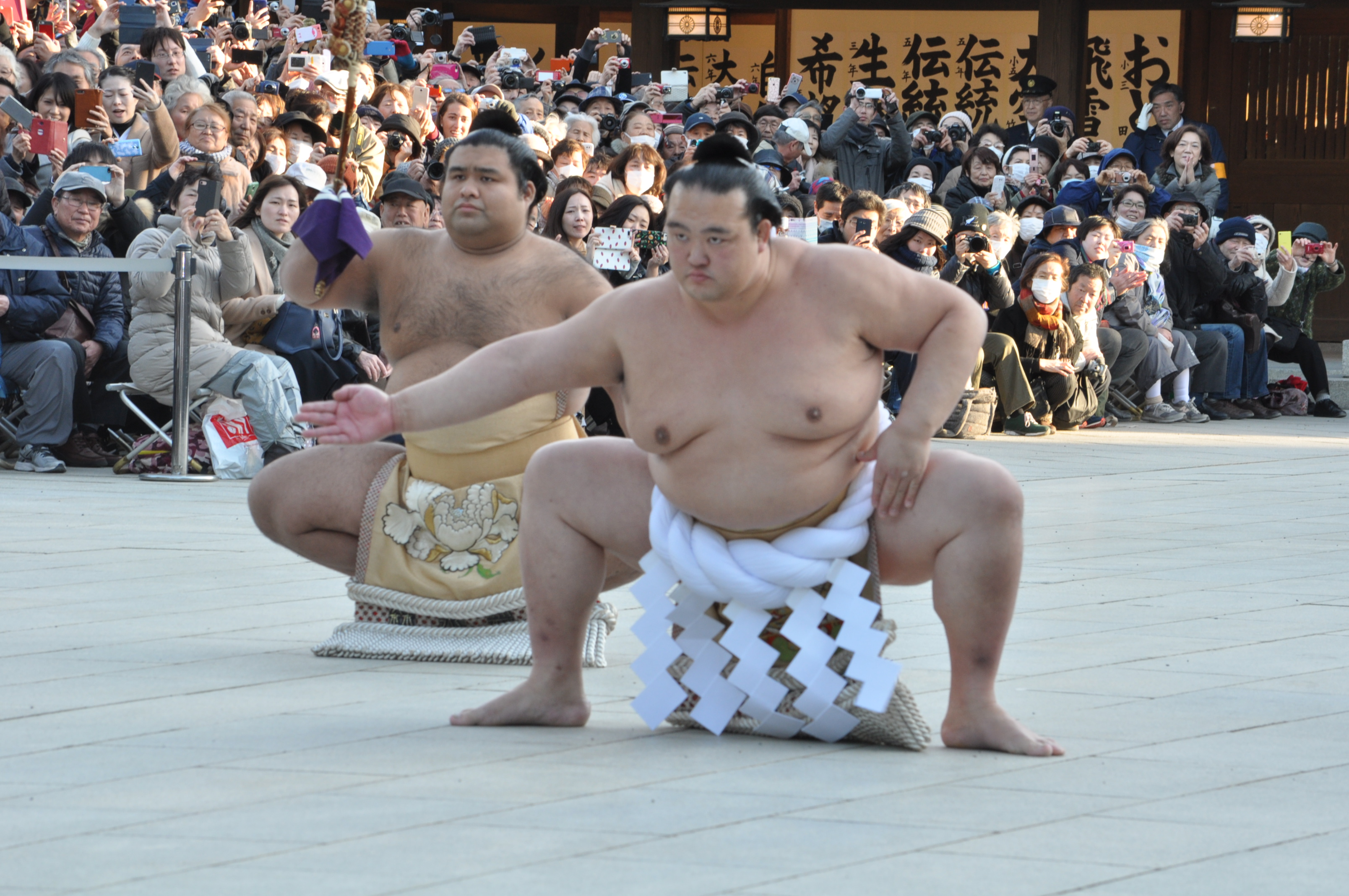
Takayasu (left) as the tachimochi (sword-bearer) at Kisenosato's first yokozuna ring-entering ceremony (2017)

Back at komusubi in January 2017 Takayasu produced one of his best efforts as he finished in a tie for third place and was awarded the special prize for Fighting Spirit. His 11 wins included victories over yokozuna Kakuryū and Hakuhō and three of the four ōzeki (the fourth ōzeki was his stablemate Kisenosato). In March 2017 Takayasu was back up to sekiwake at West Sekiwake #1. Takayasu was able to win his first 10 days straight, the first time he had ever gone 10–0 to start a tournament which put him in contention for the cup. On Day 11 and 12 Takayasu lost against yokozuna Kakuryū and Harumafuji, then on Day 13 lost against Yoshikaze. However, he was able to win the final two days and finish out the tournament with a 12–3 record. For his performance in the tournament he won the Outstanding Performance prize, for the third time. Having 23 wins in the last two tournaments in the titled ranks of san'yaku, it appeared that Takayasu would receive serious attention for promotion to ōzeki if he could achieve around 11 wins or more in the May 2017 tournament. The Chairman of the Japan Sumo Association (JSA), Hakkaku, has called for him to show greater consistency, saying he "is competitive when he follows his winning formula, but he still has many weak points." Takayasu achieved his target, recording his eleventh win with a victory over Harumafuji on the thirteenth day, and was awarded his second Technique prize. Immediately after the tournament Hakkaku announced that an extraordinary meeting of the JSA board of directors would be convened to consider Takayasu's promotion. On May 31, Takayasu was officially promoted to ōzeki. During his promotion speech, he was quoted as saying "I will devote myself to sumo and compete fairly so I can live up to my name as ōzeki."

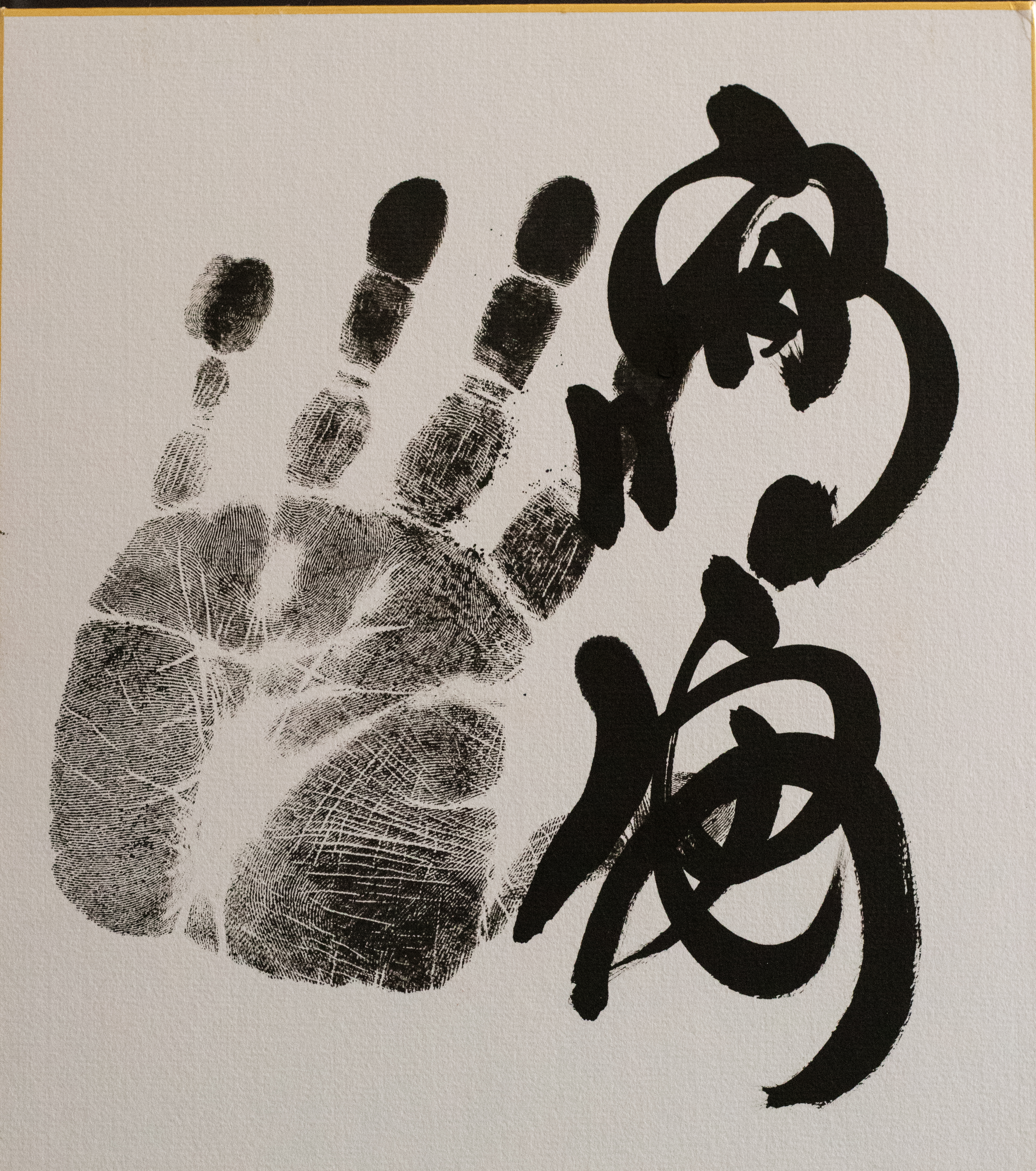
Takayasu original tegata (handprint & signature)

=== Ōzeki ===
In his first tournament as an ōzeki Takayasu won eight of his first ten matches and appeared to be in contention for the championship, but a run of four consecutive defeats followed and he ended with a record of 9–6. The September tournament saw three of the four yokozuna withdraw beforehand due to injuries, and Takayasu seemed poised to challenge for the championship, but he injured a muscle in his right thigh in a match on the second day, and was himself forced to withdraw. During the November tournament, Takayasu managed to win 8 matches, saving his rank but was again forced to withdraw after Day 12 due to a thigh injury. In January 2018 he had his best result to date as an ōzeki, finishing runner-up to surprise winner Tochinoshin with a 12–3 record. In the March tournament Takayasu started off with two losses but followed those up with 9 straight wins, before being defeated by Chiyomaru. Takayasu then went on to win his last three matches; handing yokozuna Kakuryu, who had already won the tournament going into Day 15, his second loss. Finishing the tournament with a 12–3 record Takayasu was a runner-up to Kakuryu, alongside fellow runner-up Kaisei. He injured his left upper arm in training shortly before the beginning of May tournament and announced his withdrawal from the first day, although he still hoped to enter the tournament later – "I decided to play it safe because I can’t compete in my 100 percent form. I still want to join the tournament if I recover in time." He ended up missing the entire tournament and was kadoban in July, although he retained his ōzeki rank with a 9–6 record. He was runner-up for the fourth time in his career in November 2018, finishing one win behind Takakeishō on 12–3. In July 2019 he injured his left elbow in his Day 8 match with Tamawashi, and withdrew after securing his majority of wins, defaulting against Hakuhō on Day 11. His withdrawal, following Takakeishō, Tochinoshin and Gōeidō, meant four ōzeki were absent from a tournament for the first time since the beginning of the Showa era in 1926. The injury forced him to sit out the following tournament in September.

After starting the November 2019 tournament in Fukuoka with a 3–4 record, Takayasu appeared in the dohyō-iri before the main bouts for Day 8, but then withdrew suddenly from his match against Takarafuji due to lower back pain. Takayasu's stablemaster later confirmed that he would not be re-entering the tournament. As a kadoban ōzeki, a losing record meant that Takayasu was relegated to sekiwake for the next basho. He lost all chances for an immediate promotion back to ōzeki with his sixth loss in the January 2020 tournament, and will have to start over from scratch to regain the rank.

=== Later career ===
Takayasu was back in the maegashira ranks for the first time since May 2016 in the March 2020 tournament. He withdrew on Day 5 after four straight losses, with a left thigh injury. He returned in July 2020 with a 10–5 record, his first score in double figures since March 2019. Another 10-5 performance in September 2020 paved the way for his return to the san'yaku ranks; he finished the November 2020 tournament as komusubi with a winning 8–7 record. In the March 2021 tournament Takayasu was two wins ahead of the rest of the field with only one loss entering Day 11, but he was defeated by Shōdai for the eighth straight time and saw his lead cut to one win. He lost his final three matches to finish out of the running on 10–5, his final day defeat to Aoiyama costing him a share of the Fighting Spirit prize. He moved up to sekiwake in May and produced another 10–5 record, with chief judge Isegahama Oyakata indicating that winning the championship in July could lead to promotion back to ōzeki. However, he injured his lower back in training shortly before the start of the tournament and announced his withdrawal. While this likely eliminated his re-promotion hopes, stablemaster Tagonoura said that Takayasu could return to competition during the basho. He sat out just the first two days, returning on Day 3.

Takayasu withdrew from the September 2021 tournament with a hip injury after he was driven out of the ring by yokozuna Terunofuji in their Day 11 contest. It was the second straight tournament that he was unable to finish, and his losing record resulted in him being demoted back to the maegashira ranks in November.

Takayasu sat out of the January 2022 tournament after four individuals at his stable, including his stablemaster (former maegashira Takanotsuru), tested positive for COVID-19. Takayasu returned in the March 2022 tournament to win his first 10 bouts, but ultimately finished 12–3, losing his winning streak and the yūshō playoff to new sekiwake Wakatakakage. With this effort, Takayasu earned the special Fighting Spirit prize, his first sanshō in almost five years.

Soon after the banzuke was released for the July 2022 tournament, Takayasu and a junior stablemate tested positive for COVID-19. Takayasu, and the entire Tagonoura stable, were withdrawn from the tournament a few days later after another junior wrestler tested positive. It was the second time in 2022 that Takayasu has had to sit out of a tournament due to COVID rules. Returning in September, Takayasu was runner-up to Tamawashi with an 11–4 record, having failed to beat Tamawashi on the final day to force a playoff. Takayasu received his sixth career Fighting Spirit Prize for this performance.

Takayasu entered the final day of the November 2022 Tournament with a chance to win his first Emperor's Cup outright but was defeated by maegashira Abi, setting up a three-way playoff between himself, Abi and ōzeki Takakeishō. Takayasu drew Abi in the first playoff match, but lost after his head slammed hard into Abi's chest on the tachi-ai. He appeared stunned, and needed assistance to stand up from the ring. Abi would eventually win the playoff, resulting in Takayasu's third runner-up performance of the year. Takayasu received his fourth Shukun-shō (Outstanding Performance prize) for his efforts.

Takayasu was promoted to sekiwake for the January 2023 tournament, but withdrew after suffering 4 defeats in his first 5 matches. It was later reported that Takayasu pulled out due to a shinbone contusion. This led to his demotion to maegashira 7 for the March tournament. During the May tournament of the same year, Takayasu withdrew from the first day because of an injury to the back of his right thigh sustained during a morning training session. Although the medical certificate indicated that Takayasu would need three weeks to recover, he expressed his desire to try to return to competition later in the basho.

At the September 2023 tournament, Takayasu once again found himself in contention for the title. He entered the final day at 10-4, being able to enter a playoff with ōzeki Takakeishō and maegashira Atamifuji if he could get an 11th win. However, he was defeated by ōzeki Kirishima and was unable to do so. After posting another 10-win result in the November tournament of 2023, Takayasu was once again elevated to san'yaku with the rank of komusubi. At the start of the January 2024 tournament he withdrew after two days because of back pain issues. He returned on Day 6, and competed in two more matches before withdrawing again on Day 8. His medical certificate indicated that he contracted influenza and that his back pain returned, which would require about ten days of home rest. At the March 2024 tournament, a record of 11-4 gave him the eighth jun-yūshō of his career. Takayasu also contracted an injury shortly before the start of the third day of the May 2024 tournament, forcing him to declare himself kyūjō despite going on a consecutive winning streak against Ōnosato and Wakamotoharu. Later in the tournament he expressed his desire to return to competition, and in his comeback he defeated both ōzeki Hōshōryū (Day 9) and Kotozakura (Day 10), also improving his head-to-head record against the former to 9 wins from 11 bouts.

On the opening day of the July 2024 tournament he lost to sekiwake Kirishima and was seen clutching his chest after the match. He withdrew the following day, having been diagnosed with a partial tear of his left pectoral muscle. Takayasu resumed training with the intention of taking part in the September tournament, mentioning however that he was paying more attention to his practice as he felt he was "driving a car that has travelled 300,000 kilometers".

In March 2025, Takayasu once again asserted himself as a wrestler on the verge of greatness, recording a kinboshi against the brand-new yokozuna Hōshōryū on the eighth day, and snatching a twelfth victory on the final day. The latter qualified him for a playoff with the title on the line against ōzeki Ōnosato. Takayasu lost out, however, nonetheless taking the Technique prize for his efforts during the tournament. Takayasu currently holds the record for most runner-ups for an active rikishi in the top division, with nine.

Takayasu was repromoted to the san'yaku ranks for the May 2025 tournament for the first time in over a year. Despite finishing with a record of 6 wins and 9 losses, Takayasu was able to remain at komusubi for the July 2025 tournament. Of the 126 times a komusubi posted a 6-9 record since the 15-day tournament was established, this was the first time he was not relegated to the Maegashira ranks. Takayasu would continue to post winning records, with the January 2026 tournament seeing him return to sekiwake for the first time in three years. At the March 2026 tournament, Takayasu won his first five bouts only to suffer a seven-match losing streak after his chronic lower back pain worsened. He was able to obtain a seventh win and likely ensure he remained in san'yaku by defeating new komusubi Atamifuji on the final day, finishing with a 7-8 record.

At the May 2026 Tournament, Takayasu started strong with a win against yokozuna Hōshōryū on opening day. He also won his match against Ichiyamamoto on the second day. However, he was pushed out of the ring by Hiradoumi on Day 3 and appeared to be limping on his right leg. He announced his withdrawal from the tournament the next day, making him the 4th wrestler in the san'yaku ranks to be absent. This was Takayasu's first withdrawal since July 2024 and put an end to his 7 consecutive basho in san'yaku, the most since he was an ōzeki.

Before the final day of the 2026 July tournament, it was announced that Takayasu could win a seventh special prize for Fighting Spirit if he won his last match. Takayasu won the match against Asanoyama and won the award.

On the fourth day of the September 2026 tournament, Takayasu stood out by winning his seventh kinboshi against Ōnosato. As the only maegashira to have defeated the yokozuna in the tournament, Takayasu was listed as a potential recipient for a special prize for Outstanding Performance, provided that he posted a positive result by securing an eighth victory on the final day of the tournament and that Ōnosato won the championship that day.

== Fighting style ==
Takayasu is an oshi-sumo specialist, preferring pushing and thrusting techniques (tsuki/oshi) to fighting on the opponent's mawashi. His most common winning kimarite so far in his career are yori-kiri (force out), hataki-komi (slap down) and oshi-dashi (push out). He strengthened his physique and his pushing techniques through intense training sessions with his senior stablemate Kisenosato.

== Personal life ==
In October 2019 Takayasu announced his engagement to enka singer Konomi Mori. They were married in July 2020 and welcomed their first child, a baby girl, in February 2021. Takayasu credited his strong performance in the July 2020 tournament on the news that his wife was pregnant. He had an equally strong tournament in March 2021 immediately following his daughter's birth. This has given rise to the popular nickname "Papayasu". In August 2022, they welcomed their second child, a baby boy. Due to the COVID crisis, the couple celebrated their religious wedding in June 2023, at the Hokkaidō Shrine, and held a reception in Tokyo later in the month with 700 guests attending.

== Career record ==
Takayasu Akira
Year	January Hatsu basho, Tokyo	March Haru basho, Osaka	May Natsu basho, Tokyo	July Nagoya basho, Nagoya	September Aki basho, Tokyo	November Kyūshū basho, Fukuoka
2005	x	(Maezumō)	West Jonokuchi #29; 4–3	West Jonidan #129; 4–3	East Jonidan #98; 4–3	East Jonidan #73; 4–3
2006	West Jonidan #48; 2–5	West Jonidan #78; 3–4	West Jonidan #98; 5–2	East Jonidan #44; 3–4	West Jonidan #67; 4–3	West Jonidan #41; 5–2
2007	West Jonidan #5; 4–3	East Sandanme #86; 5–2	East Sandanme #55; 5–2	West Sandanme #27; 3–4	West Sandanme #41; 4–3	East Sandanme #26; 5–2
2008	East Sandanme #2; 3–4	East Sandanme #11; 4–3	West Makushita #59; 4–3	West Makushita #51; 3–4	East Sandanme #5; 4–3	East Makushita #54; 5–2
2009	East Makushita #39; 2–5	East Sandanme #3; 4–3	East Makushita #54; 4–3	East Makushita #44; 4–3	West Makushita #36; 5–2	East Makushita #27; 4–3
2010	West Makushita #22; 4–3	West Makushita #18; 5–2	West Makushita #10; 4–3	East Makushita #6; 2–5	West Makushita #13; 7–0; Champion	East Jūryō #11; 11–4–P
2011	East Jūryō #3; 9–6	East Jūryō #1; Tournament Cancelled; Match fixing investigation 0–0–0	East Jūryō #1; 8–7	East Maegashira #11; 9–6	East Maegashira #6; 6–9	West Maegashira #8; 9–6
2012	West Maegashira #3; 6–9	East Maegashira #7; 10–5	West Maegashira #1; 5–10	West Maegashira #5; 6–9	West Maegashira #9; 10–5	East Maegashira #4; 5–10
2013	East Maegashira #7; 12–3; F	East Maegashira #1; 5–10 ★	West Maegashira #5; 8–7	West Maegashira #1; 9–6; O★	West Komusubi #1; 5–10	East Maegashira #3; 3–12
2014	East Maegashira #9; 9–6	West Maegashira #3; 5–10	West Maegashira #8; 6–9	West Maegashira #11; 11–4; F	East Maegashira #2; 7–8	East Maegashira #3; 10–5; O★★
2015	East Komusubi #1; 6–9	East Maegashira #3; 3–12	West Maegashira #8; 10–5	East Maegashira #2; 6–9	West Maegashira #3; 1–3–11	West Maegashira #12; 9–6
2016	West Maegashira #8; 11–4	West Maegashira #1; 5–10	West Maegashira #5; 9–6	West Komusubi #1; 11–4; T	East Sekiwake #1; 10–5; F	East Sekiwake #1; 7–8
2017	East Komusubi #1; 11–4; F	West Sekiwake #1; 12–3; O	West Sekiwake #1; 11–4; T	East Ōzeki #2; 9–6	East Ōzeki #1; 1–2–12	West Ōzeki #1; 8–4–3
2018	West Ōzeki #1; 12–3	East Ōzeki #1; 12–3	East Ōzeki #1; Sat out due to injury 0–0–15	West Ōzeki #1; 9–6	West Ōzeki #1; 11–4	West Ōzeki #1; 12–3
2019	East Ōzeki #1; 9–6	East Ōzeki #1; 10–5	West Ōzeki #1; 9–6	West Ōzeki #1; 8–3–4	East Ōzeki #1; Sat out due to injury 0–0–15	West Ōzeki #1; 3–5–7
2020	West Sekiwake #1; 6–9	West Maegashira #1; 0–5–10	East Maegashira #13; Tournament Cancelled; State of Emergency; 0–0–0	East Maegashira #13; 10–5	East Maegashira #6; 10–5	West Komusubi #1; 8–7
2021	East Komusubi #1; 9–6	East Komusubi #1; 10–5	East Sekiwake #1; 10–5	East Sekiwake #1; 7–6–2	East Komusubi #1; 4–8–3	East Maegashira #5; 6–9
2022	East Maegashira #7; Sat out due to COVID rules 0–0–15	East Maegashira #7; 12–3–P; F	East Maegashira #1; 6–9	West Maegashira #4; Sat out due to COVID rules 0–0–15	West Maegashira #4; 11–4; F★	East Maegashira #1; 12–3–P; O
2023	East Sekiwake #2; 1–5–9	East Maegashira #7; 10–5	East Maegashira #2; 3–3–9	East Maegashira #7; 7–8	East Maegashira #7; 10–5	East Maegashira #3; 10–5
2024	East Komusubi #1; 2–4–9	West Maegashira #8; 11–4	East Maegashira #3; 7–3–5	East Maegashira #3; 0–2–13	East Maegashira #15; 10–5	West Maegashira #9; 8–7
2025	East Maegashira #6; 8–7	East Maegashira #4; 12–3–P; T★	East Komusubi #1; 6–9	West Komusubi #1; 10–5	East Komusubi #1; 7–8	West Komusubi #1; 8–7
2026	West Sekiwake #1; 8–7	West Sekiwake #1; 7–8	West Komusubi #1; 2–2–11	West Maegashira #7; 11–4; F	East Maegashira #2; 7–8 ★	East Maegashira #3; 3–12
Record given as wins–losses–absences Top division champion Top division runner-up Retired Non-participation Jūryō Lower divisions Sanshō key: F=Fighting spirit; O=Outstanding performance; T=Technique Also shown: ★=Kinboshi; P=Playoff(s); Divisions: Makuuchi — Jūryō — Makushita — Sandanme — Jonidan — Jonokuchi Makuuchi ranks: Yokozuna — Ōzeki — Sekiwake — Komusubi — Maegashira

== See also ==
- Glossary of sumo terms
- List of active sumo wrestlers
- List of active gold star earners
- List of active special prize winners
- List of sumo record holders
- List of sumo top division runners-up
- List of ōzeki
