= Tagonoura stable (2013) =

Organization of sumo wrestlers

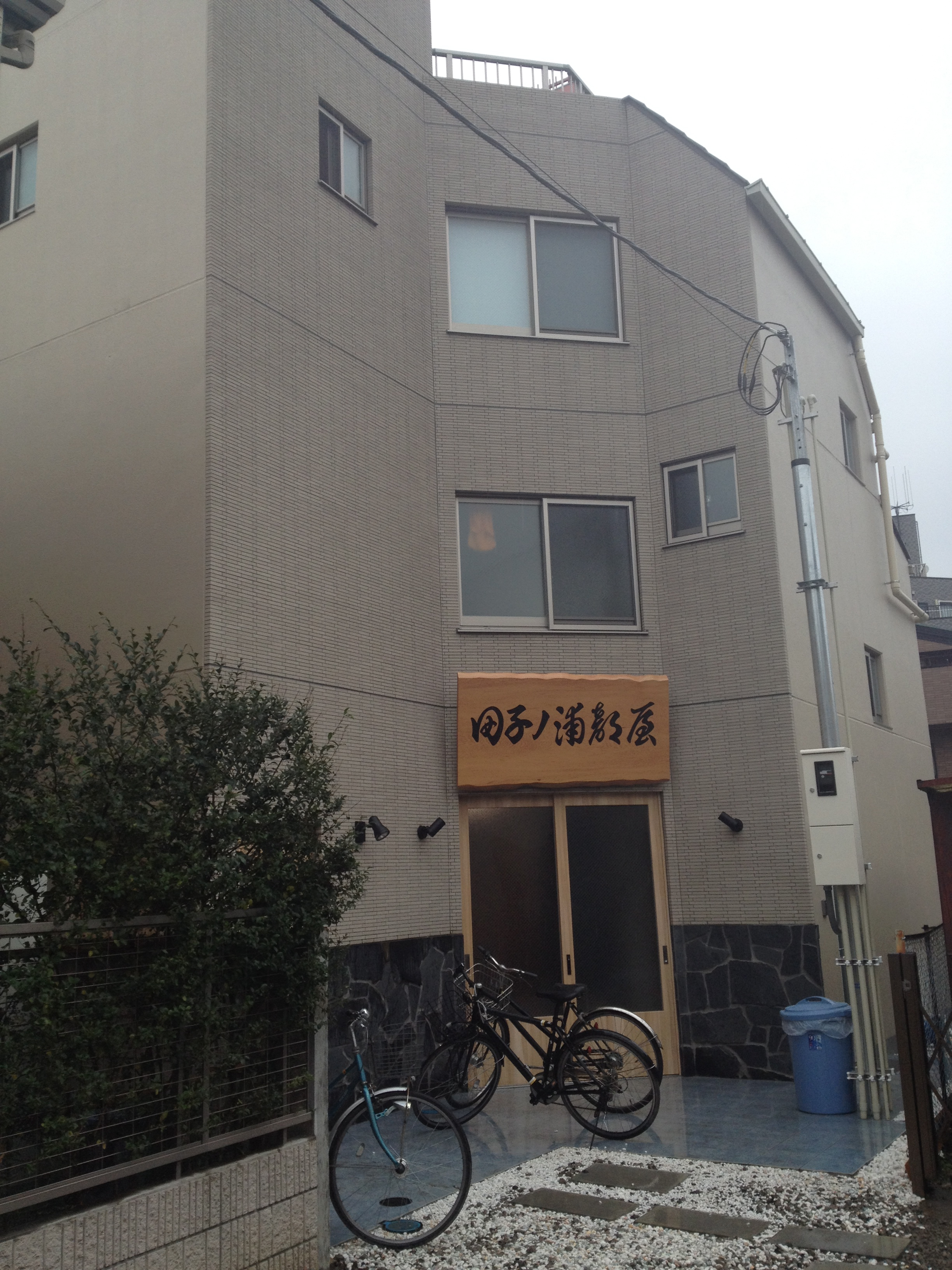

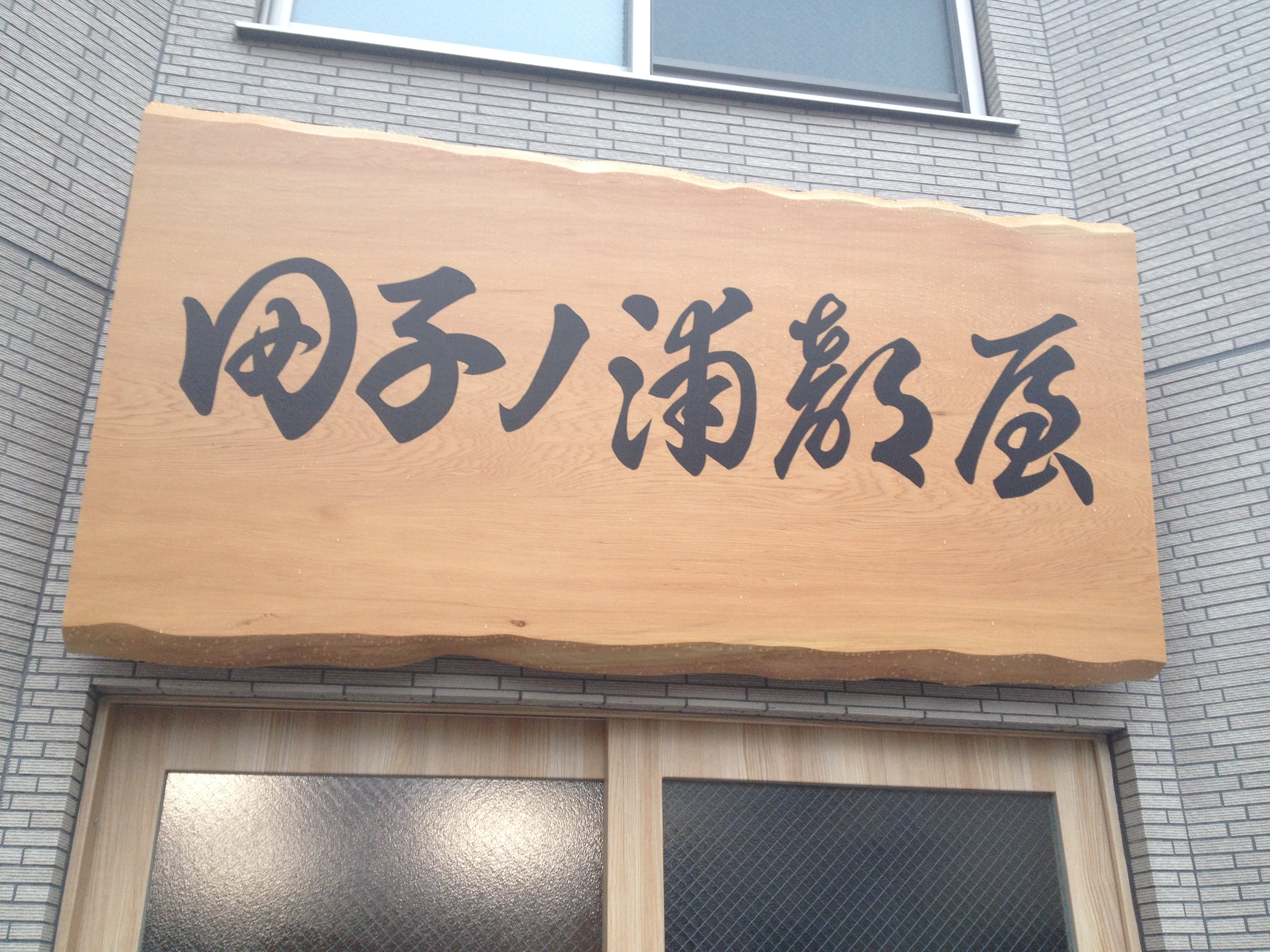

Tagonoura stable (田子ノ浦部屋, Tagonoura-beya), formerly Naruto stable, is a stable of sumo wrestlers, one of the Nishonoseki group of stables.

As of May 2026, the stable has 15 active wrestlers.

The stable was established as Naruto stable, on 1 February 1989 by former yokozuna Takanosato Toshihide. The stable's first sekitori was Rikiō in 1994. Four more, Wakanosato, Takanowaka, Takayasu and Kisenosato, have reached sekiwake rank, with Takayasu going on to reach the ōzeki rank, and the stable's first yokozuna being Kisenosato. It had a reputation for being a closed, family-knit stable, as Naruto did not allow his wrestlers to go out and train at other stables (which is unusual in sumo) or socialize with wrestlers from different stables.

Naruto died suddenly on 7 November 2011. The stable's current master, maegashira Takanotsuru, changed to the Tagonoura toshiyori in December 2013 and renamed the stable accordingly. Upon changing the stable name, the stable was also moved to the Ryōgoku area from Matsudo, Chiba. It has no connection to the defunct Tagonoura stable established by the late Kushimaumi.

The stable sat out of the January 2022 tournament after four individuals, including the stablemaster, tested positive for COVID-19. The stable withdrew a second time in July 2022 after three wrestlers, including Takayasu, tested positive for the virus.

== Ring name conventions ==
Many wrestlers at this stable have taken ring names or shikona that end with the character 里 (read: sato), meaning village or native place, in deference to their coach and the stable's owner, the deceased former Takanosato.

== Owners ==
- 2011–present: 16th Tagonoura: (iin, maegashira Takanotsuru, born 1976)
- 1989–2011: 13th Naruto: (the 59th yokozuna Takanosato, born 1952–2011)

== Notable active wrestlers ==
- Takayasu Akira (best rank ōzeki, born 1990)

== Notable former members ==
- Kisenosato Yutaka (the 72nd yokozuna, born 1986)
- Wakanosato Shinobu (sekiwake, born 1976)
- Takanowaka Yūki (sekiwake, born 1976)
- Takanotsuru Shinichi (maegashira 8, born 1976)
- Takanoyama Shuntarō (maegashira 12, born 1983)

== Referees ==
- Kimura Shozuburō (jūryō gyōji, real name Keiichirō Shigeyama, born 1976)
- Kimura Yunosuke (jonokuchi gyōji, real name Keiichirō Shigeyama, born 2008)

== Usher ==
- Mitsuaki (makuuchi yobidashi, real name Mitsuaki Kanai, born 1975)

== Hairdresser ==
- Tokonaru (first class tokoyama, born 1975)

== Location and access ==
Tokyo, Edogawa ward, Higashi Koiwa 4-9-20
10 minute walk from Koiwa Station on the Sōbu Line

== See also ==
- List of sumo stables
- List of active sumo wrestlers
- List of past sumo wrestlers
- Glossary of sumo terms
