= Min-young =

- Hangul: 민영
- RR: Minyeong
- MR: Minyŏng

Min-young is a Korean given name.

People with this name include:

- Lee Min-young (actress) (born 1976), South Korean actress
- Park Min-young (born 1986), South Korean actress
- Jennifer Song (born Song Min-young, 1989), American golfer
- Min (South Korean singer) (born Lee Min-young, 1991), South Korean female singer

Fictional characters with this name include:

- Gong Min-young, in 2010 South Korean film Cyrano Agency and its spin-off 2013 television series Dating Agency: Cyrano
- Ahn Min-young, in 2012 South Korean television series The Innocent Man
- Noh Min-young, in 2013 South Korean television series All About My Romance

== See also ==
- List of Korean given names
