= Wakanosato Shinobu =

Japanese sumo wrestler (born 1976)

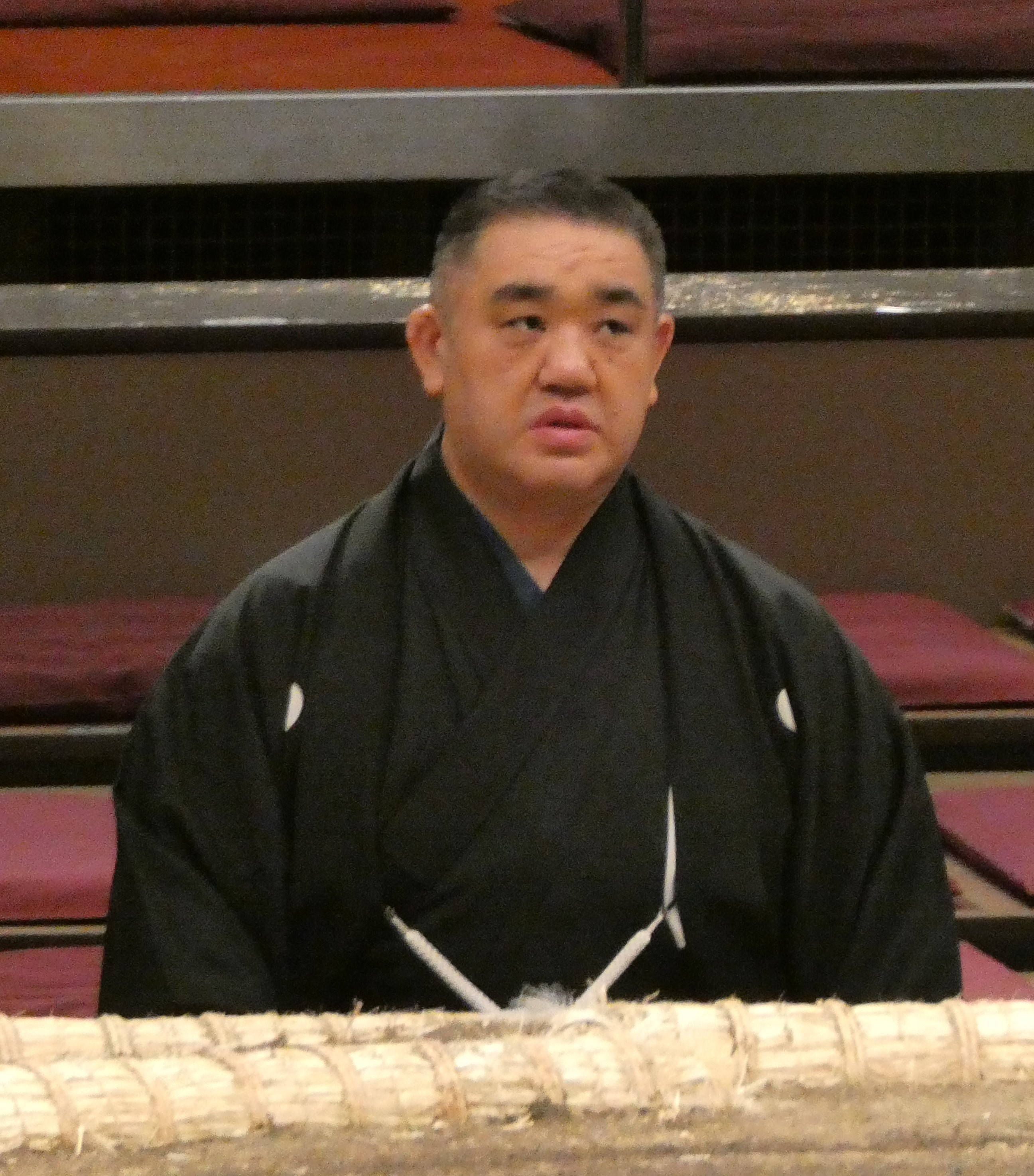

Personal information
- Native name: 若の里 忍
- Born: Kogawa Shinobu; July 10, 1976 (age 50) Aomori
- Height: 1.84 m (6 ft 1/2 in)
- Weight: 156 kg (344 lb; 24.6 st)
- Website: https://lineblog.me/wakanosato/ Personal Blog

Sport
- Sport: Sumo
- Retired: September 2015
- Heya: Tagonoura
- Record: 914-783-124
- Debut: March 1992
- Highest rank: Sekiwake (January 2001)
- Elder name: Nishiiwa
- Championships: 4 (Jūryō); 1 (Makushita); 1 (Jonokuchi)
- Special Prizes: Outstanding Performance (4); Fighting Spirit (4); Technique (2)
- Gold Stars: 2 Wakanohana III; Asashōryū
- Updated on September 4, 2015

Wakanosato Shinobu (born Shinobu Kogawa; July 10, 1976) is a retired sumo wrestler from Hirosaki, Aomori, Japan. He made his debut in the top division in 1998, and his highest rank was sekiwake. He holds the record for the most consecutive tournaments ranked in the junior san'yaku ranks of sekiwake and komusubi (19 from 2002 until 2005). He won ten special prizes and was twice runner-up in a tournament. He earned two gold stars for defeating yokozuna at a maegashira rank. He had 1691 career bouts, sixth on the all-time list. He retired in 2015 and was a coach at Tagonoura stable, until opening his own Nishiiwa stable in February 2018.

== Early life and sumo background ==
He first tried sumo in the third grade when he entered a competition for fourth graders and up and came in third. By middle school he was training every day at a sumo dojo. He met Takahanada (later the 65th yokozuna Takanohana) when a regional tour came to Hirozaki City, getting into the ring with him. He entered professional sumo in March 1992 after completing middle school, although he had been admitted to Hirosaki Jitsygyo High School. He had received offers from four or five different heya upon his graduation, but the small and relatively new Naruto stable appealed to him.

== Career ==
As with many sumo wrestlers, he initially competed under his family name, Kogawa, under which he won the third-division championship in an eight-way playoff in March 1997. Upon reaching the second highest jūryō division in November 1997, he was given the fighting name of Wakanosato, reminiscent of his stablemaster, former yokozuna Takanosato.

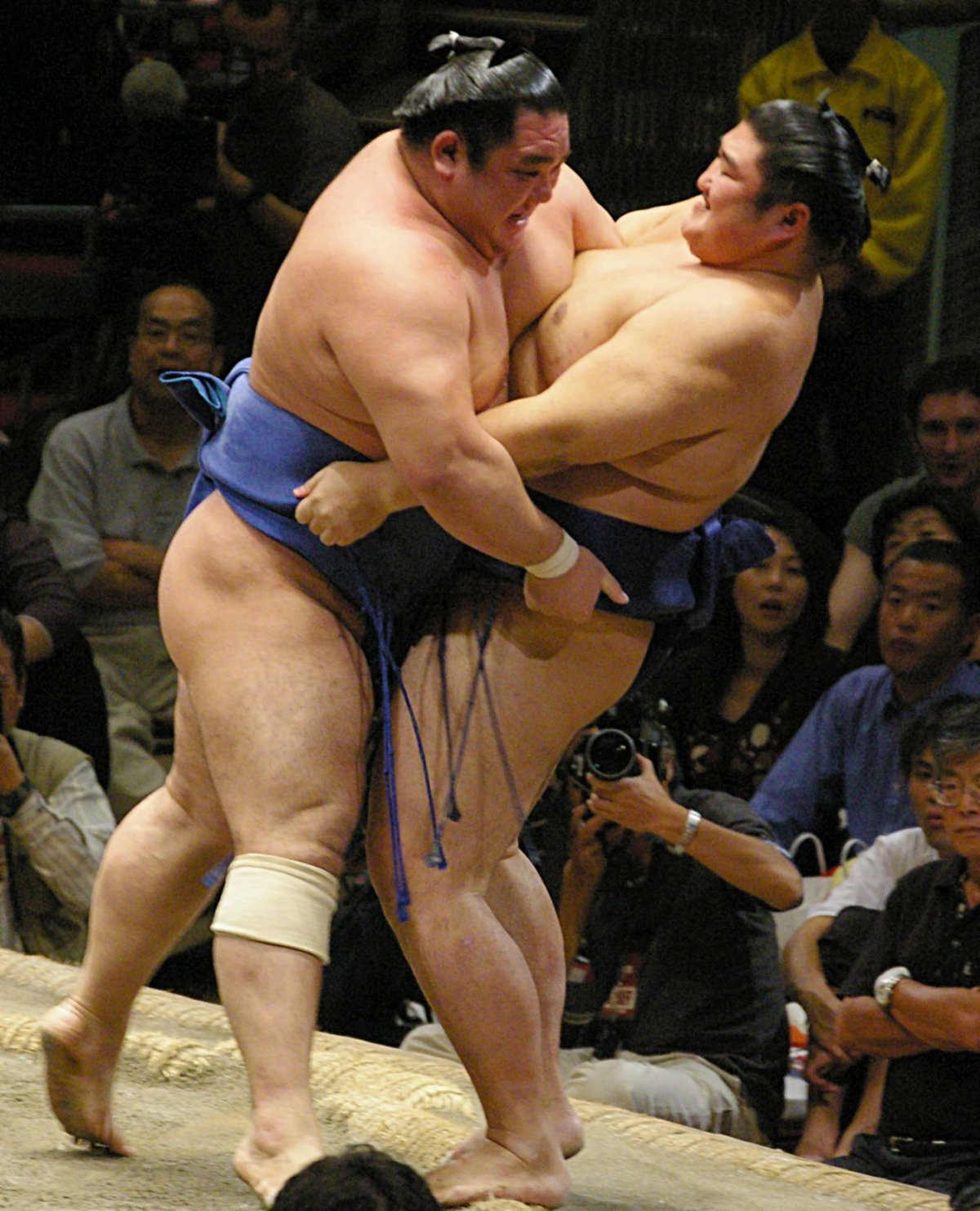
Wakanosato against Kotomitsuki

He entered the top makuuchi division for the first time in May 1998. He recorded his first kinboshi or gold star win against yokozuna Wakanohana in the November 1998 tournament, but the next day he broke his ankle in a match with Musōyama and had to miss the last day of the tournament and all of the next. He suffered a more serious injury in November 1999, rupturing anterior cruciate ligaments. He sat out two successive tournaments after having surgery and was demoted to the jūryō division. He won consecutive jūryō championships upon his comeback, in May and July 2000, and was promoted back to makuuchi in September. He quickly made the titled san'yaku ranks, making komusubi in November 2000 and recovering from 2–6 down to finish 9–6. As a result, he was promoted to sekiwake for the first time in January 2001.

In his early top division career, Wakanosato was considered a promising candidate for ōzeki. From January 2002 until January 2005, he spent 19 consecutive tournaments ranked at either komusubi or sekiwake, an all-time record. However, he was never able to break through the "great barrier" (the literal meaning of ōzeki), just failing to attain the necessary 33 wins over three tournaments. He was runner-up in the January 2003 tournament, and again in September 2003, where his 11–4 score was probably his best chance to make ōzeki. However, he could only manage seven wins in the following tournament. He was never able to consistently beat the top ranked wrestlers, being unable to beat Takanohana in nine attempts and winning only five times out of 32 meetings against ōzeki Chiyotaikai. He initially had an excellent head-to-head record against Hakuhō, defeating him the first six times they met. However, the last of these victories came in 2005 and he subsequently lost eleven in a row against Hakuhō. He was awarded ten sanshō or special prizes for good performances in tournaments during his career.

In later years, on the dohyō he again had injury problems, being forced to withdraw from his final san'yaku-ranked tournament in September 2005 and missing all of the next. He defeated yokozuna Asashōryū on the second day of the 2006 May tournament, his first kinboshi in 45 tournaments (only Kirinji, with 47 tournaments, has had a longer wait between kinboshi) but he could only manage a 6–9 record overall. He was then again forced to sit out all of the September 2006 tournament and fell to the second division once again. However, he made something of a comeback in May 2007, turning in a strong 10–5 record at maegashira 7. He won his 600th career bout in September 2007, and turned in another good performance in May 2008, again finishing on 10–5.

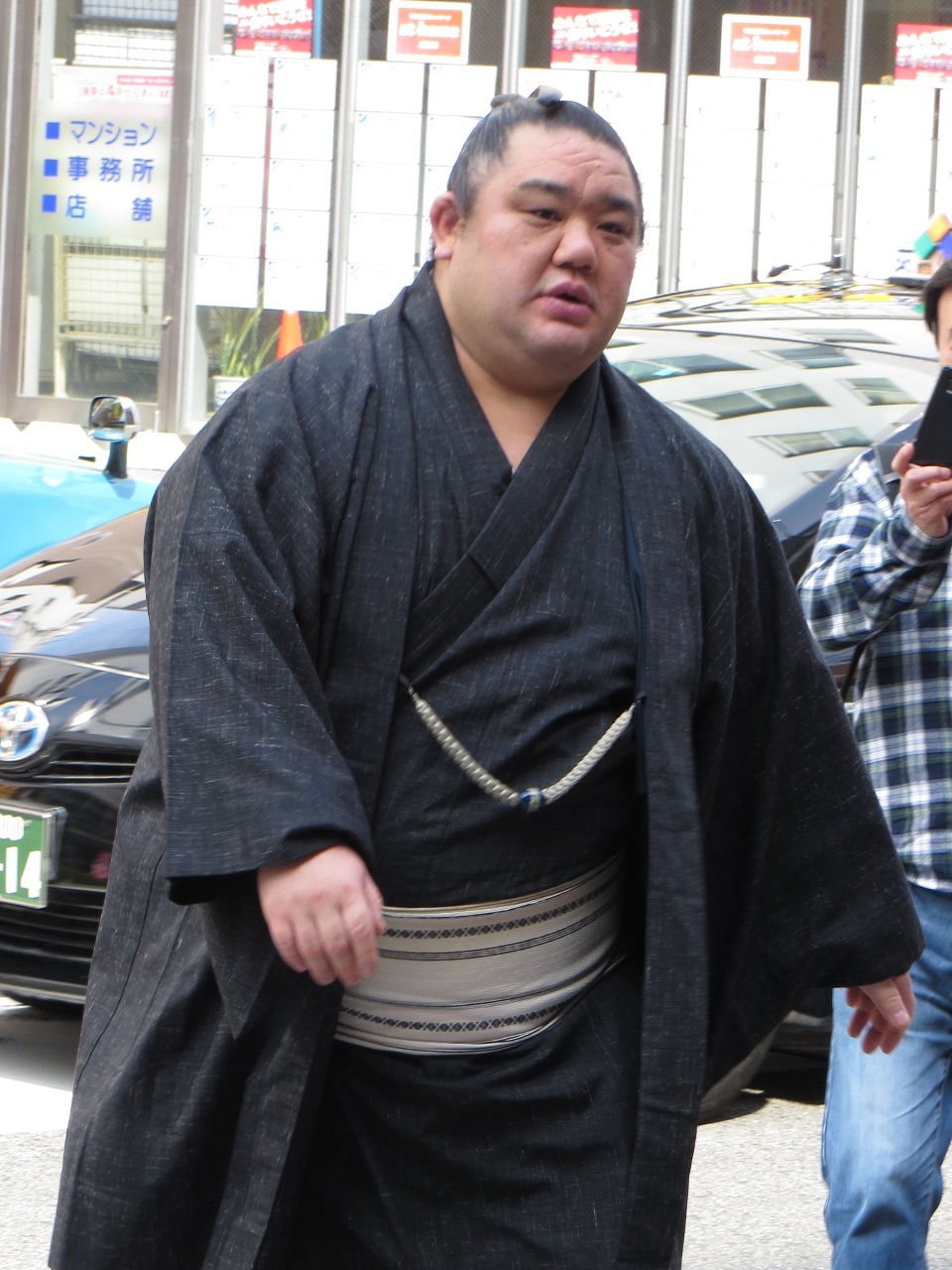
Wakanosato in 2013

He withdrew from the March 2009 tournament after breaking a metatarsal bone in his right foot during his 11th day bout with Kotoshōgiku. He had surgery on 8 April which put him out of action for at least two months, meaning he had to sit out the following tournament in May. He came back very strongly in July, winning his fourth jūryō championship with a 14–1 record. He reached maegashira 1 in March 2010, his highest rank in over four years. After that he comfortably maintained a position in the mid-to-upper maegashira ranks until he was injured in the November 2011 tournament, resulting in yet another fall to jūryō. However he immediately returned to makuuchi after scoring 11–4 in January 2012.

After a poor 4–11 record at maegashira 15 in September 2013, Wakanosato was once again demoted to jūryō, but for the first time for a non injury-related reason. He was ranked in makuuchi only one more time after that, in the July 2014 tournament.

== Retirement from sumo ==
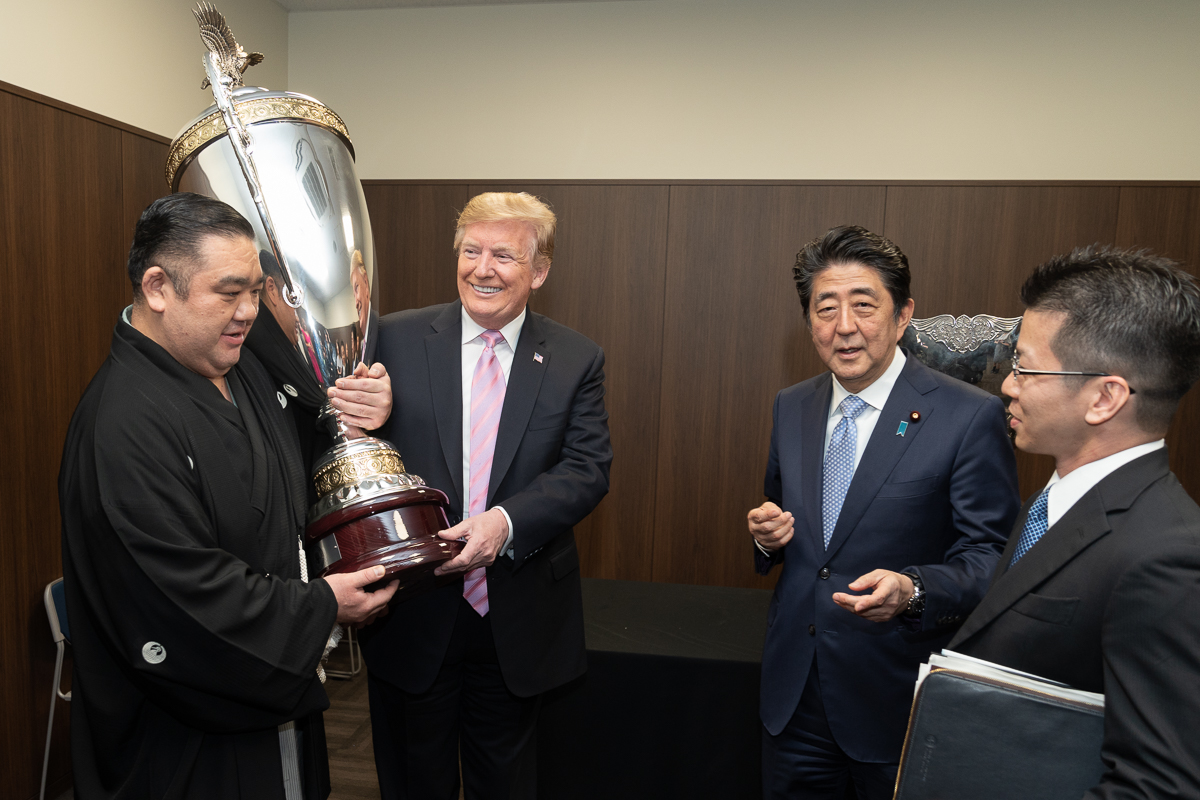
Nishiiwa Oyakata assisting US President Donald Trump in the Emperor's Cup presentation, May 2019

Following a 4–11 result in jūryō in July 2015, which guaranteed a further relegation to the makushita division, Wakanosato announced his retirement on 3 September. He told a press conference "I entered this career out of my love for sumo, and it has been enjoyable. I'm being sincere in saying I want to continue, but my body is not up to the task of matching my desire." He had already purchased a toshiyori-kabu or elder stock in the Japan Sumo Association and is now known as Nishiiwa Oyakata. He initially worked at his old stable, now renamed Tagonoura. His official retirement ceremony or danpatsu-shiki was held at the Ryōgoku Kokugikan on 28 May 2016. Wakanosato's application to open his own Nishiiwa stable was approved by the Sumo Association on 30 November 2017, and the stable opened on 1 February 2018. As of March 2019 it has six wrestlers, all in the lower divisions.

== Fighting style ==
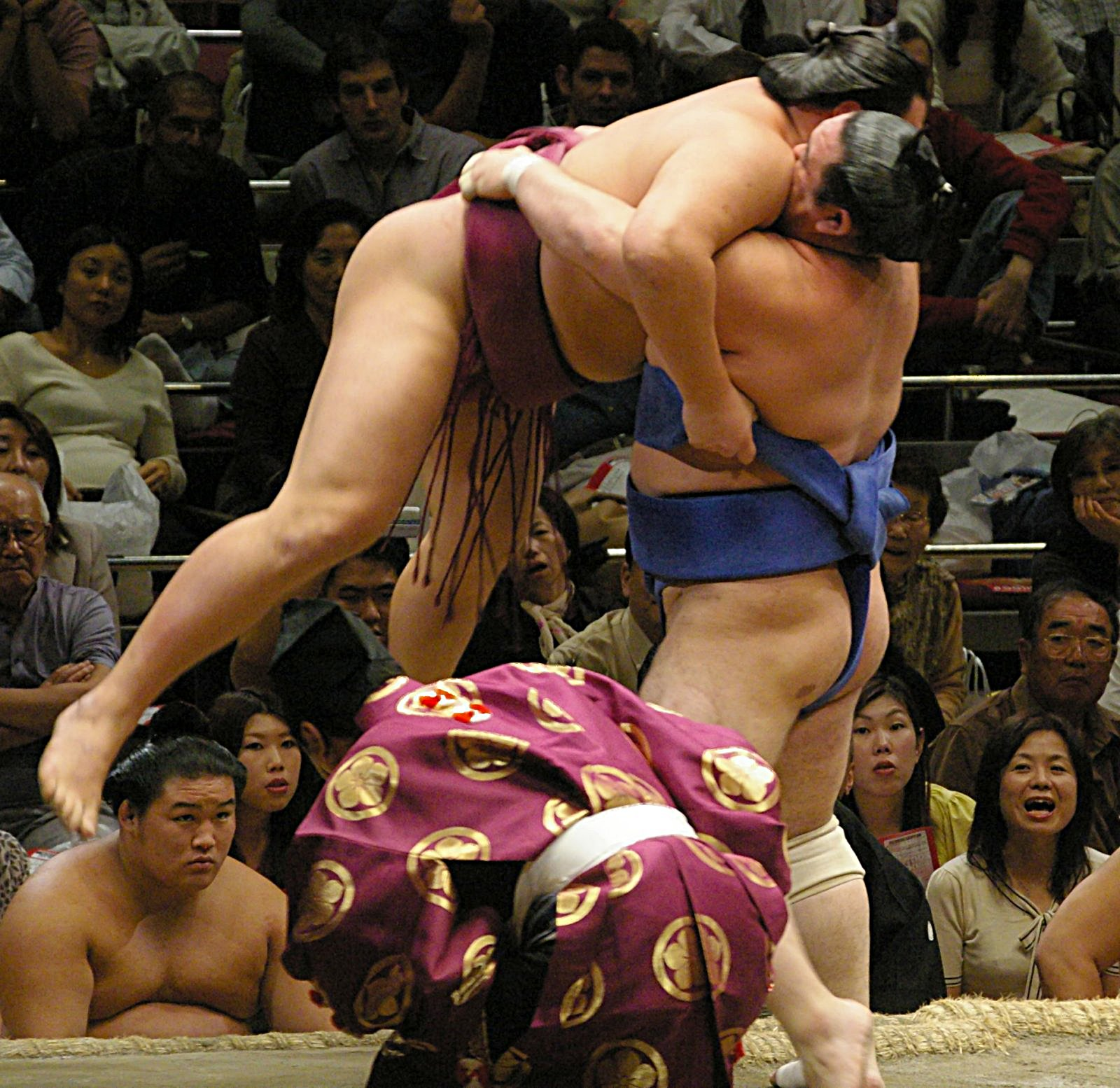
Wakanosato winning by tsuridashi, or lift out

Wakanosato specialised in yotsu-sumo, or techniques that involve grabbing hold of the opponent's mawashi. He was known as being particularly difficult to beat once he had a migi-yotsu, or right hand inside, left hand outside grip. About 40 percent of his wins were by yori kiri, or force out, but he was also good at pushing and thrusting, winning many bouts by oshi-dashi or push out. His two most commonly used throws were sukuinage (scoop throw) and uwatenage (overarm throw).

== Family ==
Wakanosato was married in April 2004. His stablemaster reported that his bride weighed just 39 kg (86 lb; 6.1 st).

== Career record ==
Wakanosato Shinobu
Year	January Hatsu basho, Tokyo	March Haru basho, Osaka	May Natsu basho, Tokyo	July Nagoya basho, Nagoya	September Aki basho, Tokyo	November Kyūshū basho, Fukuoka
1992	x	(Maezumo)	East Jonokuchi #17; 7–0; Champion	East Jonidan #20; 4–3	West Sandanme #99; 3–4	West Jonidan #19; 3–4
1993	East Jonidan #44; 5–2	West Jonidan #8; 5–2	East Sandanme #74; 4–3	West Sandanme #52; 3–4	East Sandanme #67; 5–2	West Sandanme #39; 3–4
1994	West Sandanme #56; 4–3	West Sandanme #42; 3–4	West Sandanme #62; 5–2	East Sandanme #31; 3–4	West Sandanme #52; 5–2	West Sandanme #25; 4–3
1995	West Sandanme #12; 3–4	West Sandanme #25; 3–4	West Sandanme #37; 6–1	East Makushita #57; 4–3	East Makushita #46; 3–4	West Makushita #60; 4–3
1996	East Makushita #51; 4–3	West Makushita #40; 4–3	West Makushita #30; 3–4	West Makushita #39; 5–2	East Makushita #22; 4–3	West Makushita #14; 3–4
1997	East Makushita #22; 6–1	East Makushita #8; 6–1–PPP; Champion	West Makushita #1; 3–4	East Makushita #5; 4–3	East Makushita #3; 5–2	East Jūryō #12; 10–5–P; Champion
1998	West Jūryō #5; 11–4	East Jūryō #1; 9–6	West Maegashira #15; 10–5; F	East Maegashira #11; 9–6	West Maegashira #4; 6–9	East Maegashira #6; 7–7–1 ★
1999	West Maegashira #6; Sat out due to injury 0–0–15	West Maegashira #6; 5–10	West Maegashira #10; 11–4; T	East Maegashira #2; 4–11	West Maegashira #6; 6–9	West Maegashira #9; 5–7–3
2000	West Maegashira #14; Sat out due to injury 0–0–15	West Maegashira #14; Sat out due to injury 0–0–15	East Jūryō #11; 12–3; Champion	East Jūryō #1; 13–2; Champion	West Maegashira #10; 11–4; F	West Komusubi #1; 9–6; O
2001	East Sekiwake #1; 10–5; O	East Sekiwake #1; 6–9	East Maegashira #1; 8–7	West Komusubi #1; 9–6; O	East Komusubi #1; 7–8	East Maegashira #1; 10–5; F
2002	East Komusubi #1; 8–7	East Komusubi #1; 9–6	East Komusubi #1; 8–7	West Sekiwake #1; 11–4	East Sekiwake #1; 8–7	East Sekiwake #1; 7–8
2003	West Komusubi #1; 11–4; F	East Sekiwake #2; 9–6	East Sekiwake #1; 9–6	East Sekiwake #1; 10–5	East Sekiwake #1; 11–4; O	East Sekiwake #1; 7–8
2004	West Komusubi #1; 9–6	East Sekiwake #1; 8–7	East Sekiwake #1; 9–6	East Sekiwake #1; 8–7	East Sekiwake #1; 10–5	East Sekiwake #1; 11–4; T
2005	East Sekiwake #1; 6–9	West Maegashira #1; 8–7	West Komusubi #1; 6–9	West Maegashira #2; 11–4	West Sekiwake #1; 4–3–8	East Maegashira #3; Sat out due to injury 0–0–15
2006	East Maegashira #16; 10–5	East Maegashira #11; 11–4	West Maegashira #2; 6–9 ★	East Maegashira #6; 3–2–10	East Maegashira #14; Sat out due to injury 0–0–15	East Jūryō #11; 10–5
2007	West Jūryō #4; 9–6	East Maegashira #16; 11–4	West Maegashira #7; 10–5	West Maegashira #2; 5–10	West Maegashira #4; 5–10	East Maegashira #8; 8–7
2008	East Maegashira #4; 7–8	East Maegashira #5; 5–10	West Maegashira #10; 10–5	East Maegashira #4; 5–10	West Maegashira #9; 9–6	West Maegashira #2; 6–9
2009	East Maegashira #4; 7–8	East Maegashira #5; 6–6–3	West Maegashira #7; Sat out due to injury 0–0–15	West Jūryō #6; 14–1; Champion	West Maegashira #13; 10–5	East Maegashira #6; 7–8
2010	West Maegashira #7; 9–6	West Maegashira #1; 6–9	West Maegashira #3; 6–9	East Maegashira #7; 9–6	West Maegashira #1; 5–10	West Maegashira #5; 5–10
2011	West Maegashira #9; 8–7	Tournament Cancelled; 0–0–0	West Maegashira #5; 7–8	West Maegashira #5; 9–6	East Maegashira #2; 4–11	East Maegashira #9; 2–4–9
2012	West Jūryō #2; 11–4	West Maegashira #13; 8–7	East Maegashira #10; 5–10	West Maegashira #14; 8–7	West Maegashira #11; 7–8	West Maegashira #12; 8–7
2013	East Maegashira #11; 4–11	West Maegashira #16; 9–6	East Maegashira #12; 6–9	East Maegashira #15; 7–8	East Maegashira #15; 4–11	West Jūryō #5; 8–7
2014	West Jūryō #4; 5–10	West Jūryō #8; 9–6	West Jūryō #3; 9–6	East Maegashira #16; 5–10	East Jūryō #5; 6–9	West Jūryō #6; 9–6
2015	West Jūryō #1; 5–10	West Jūryō #4; 6–9	West Jūryō #7; 5–10	West Jūryō #11; 4–11	East Makushita #4; Retired –	x
Record given as wins–losses–absences Top division champion Top division runner-up Retired Lower divisions Non-participation Sanshō key: F=Fighting spirit; O=Outstanding performance; T=Technique Also shown: ★=Kinboshi; P=Playoff(s); Divisions: Makuuchi — Jūryō — Makushita — Sandanme — Jonidan — Jonokuchi Makuuchi ranks: Yokozuna — Ōzeki — Sekiwake — Komusubi — Maegashira

== See also ==
- Glossary of sumo terms
- List of sumo record holders
- List of sumo tournament top division runners-up
- List of sumo tournament second division champions
- List of past sumo wrestlers
- List of sumo elders
- List of sekiwake
