= Terunoumi Masato =

Japanese sumo wrestler (1967–2009)

Personal information
- Native name: 大輝煌 正人
- Born: Masato Hayashi; September 15, 1967 Gobō, Wakayama, Japan
- Died: June 6, 2009 (aged 41)
- Height: 1.84 m (6 ft 1/2 in)
- Weight: 160 kg (350 lb; 25 st)

Sport
- Sport: Sumo
- Retired: May, 1993
- Heya: Musashigawa
- Record: 100-87-33
- Debut: March, 1990
- Highest rank: Maegashira 15 (January, 1991)
- Championships: 1 (Jūryō); 3 (Makushita)
- Updated on Sep. 2012

Terunoumi Masato, also known as Daikikō Masato, born Masato Hayashi (September 15, 1967 – June 6, 2009), was a sumo wrestler from Gobō, Wakayama, Japan. A former amateur champion, he made his professional debut in 1990. His highest rank was maegashira 15. He was the first wrestler in the six tournaments per year era to reach the top makuuchi division after spending just one tournament in the second highest jūryō division. After injury problems he retired in 1993, and died at the age of 41 in 2009.

== Career ==
He had played an active role in national sumo competitions since junior high school, and was a junior high school yokozuna in the third grade. He was an amateur champion at Kinki University, and won the All Japan Gakusei Championship in his senior year. He made his professional debut in March 1990 as a makushita tsukedashi entrant. It had been thought that he would join Wakamatsu stable because of their connections to Kinki University, but instead he chose Musashigawa stable, run by ex-yokozuna Mienoumi, apparently because of their excellent weight-training facilities. In May 1990 he secured his first makushita division yūshō or championship, winning out in an eight-way playoff. In September 1990 he won another makushita yūshō, this time with a perfect 7–0 record and was promoted to the jūryō division for the November 1990 tournament, becoming the first sekitori from Musashigawa stable. At this point he changed his shikona or fighting name from his own surname of Hayashi to Daikikō. He won immediate promotion to the top makuuchi division after his jūryō debut, the first wrestler to do so since the establishment of the six tournaments a year system in 1958. His 11–4 record also won him the jūryō championship. His achievement was helped by the fact that the top division was expanded from 38 to 40 wrestlers for the January 1991 tournament. However he was restricted by a neck injury and it was to be his only tournament in the top division. He missed the July and September 1991 tournaments through injury, and was demoted back to the makushita division. He won promotion back to jūryō after winning his second makushita championship, again with a perfect 7–0 record. However, he lasted only one tournament in jūryō before being demoted again. After the July 1992 tournament he dropped the Daikikō shikona and reverted to his own surname. After winning promotion to the jūryō division for the third time in January 1993 he adopted a new shikona of Terunoumi.

== Retirement from sumo ==
He retired in May 1993 after demotion to the makushita division once again. He was replaced in the jūryō division by his stablemate Musōyama. After leaving sumo he worked in an office and later became a car mechanic. He died of a cerebral haemorrhage in 2009 at the age of 41.

== Fighting style ==
Terunoumi was a yotsu-sumo wrestler, preferring grappling techniques. His favoured grip on the opponent's mawashi or belt was migi-yotsu, a left hand outside, right hand inside position. His favourite kimarite was yori kiri.

== Career record ==
Terunoumi Masato
Year	January Hatsu basho, Tokyo	March Haru basho, Osaka	May Natsu basho, Tokyo	July Nagoya basho, Nagoya	September Aki basho, Tokyo	November Kyūshū basho, Fukuoka
1990	x	Makushita tsukedashi #60; 5–2	West Makushita #37; 6–1–PPP; Champion	East Makushita #17; 6–1	West Makushita #4; 7–0; Champion	West Jūryō #9; 11–4; Champion
1991	East Maegashira #15; 5–10	West Jūryō #4; 7–8	East Jūryō #6; 9–6	East Jūryō #1; 1–3–11	West Jūryō #10; Sat out due to injury 0–0–15	West Jūryō #10; 6–9
1992	West Makushita #1; 2–5	West Makushita #9; 7–0; Champion	West Jūryō #10; 4–11	West Makushita #2; 2–5	East Makushita #13; 5–2	East Makushita #4; 4–3
1993	West Jūryō #13; 8–7	West Jūryō #10; 5–10	East Makushita #2; Retired; 0–0–7	x	x	x
Record given as wins–losses–absences Top division champion Top division runner-up Retired Lower divisions Non-participation Sanshō key: F=Fighting spirit; O=Outstanding performance; T=Technique Also shown: ★=Kinboshi; P=Playoff(s); Divisions: Makuuchi — Jūryō — Makushita — Sandanme — Jonidan — Jonokuchi Makuuchi ranks: Yokozuna — Ōzeki — Sekiwake — Komusubi — Maegashira

== See also ==
- List of sumo tournament second division champions
- Glossary of sumo terms
- List of past sumo wrestlers
