= Musashigawa =

Musashigawa is an elder name in sumo, and may refer to:

- Musashigawa stable
  - Musashigawa stable, a stable established in 2013
  - Fujishima stable (2010), known as Musashigawa stable from 1981 until 2010
- Musashigawa oyakata
  - Musashimaru Kōyō, known as Musashigawa oyakata from 2013
  - Mienoumi Tsuyoshi, known as Musashigawa oyakata from 1981 until 2013
  - Dewanohana Kuniichi, known as Musashigawa oyakata from 1940 until 1960, and from 1968 until 1974
