= Buyūzan Takeyoshi =

Japanese sumo wrestler

Personal information
- Native name: 武雄山 喬義
- Born: Takeyoshi Tominaga; July 29, 1974 (age 52) Aichi, Japan
- Height: 1.81 m (5 ft 11 1/2 in)
- Weight: 159 kg (351 lb; 25.0 st)

Sport
- Sport: Sumo
- University team: Meiji University
- Retired: November 2007
- Heya: Musashigawa
- Record: 353-370-12
- Debut: March, 1997
- Highest rank: Maegashira 1 (March, 2002)
- Elder name: Yamawake
- Championships: 1 (Jūryō)
- Special Prizes: Fighting Spirit (2)
- Updated on June 2020

Buyūzan Takeyoshi (born July 29, 1974 as Takeyoshi Tominaga in Toyohashi, Aichi, Japan) is a former sumo wrestler. His highest rank was maegashira 1. He is now a sumo coach.

== Career ==
Tominaga began competitive sumo from a young age, losing to the future Kotomitsuki, two years his junior in a competition in 1989. A former amateur sumo champion at Meiji University, Buyūzan made his professional debut in the third makushita division in March 1997. It took him over three years to reach sekitori status, when he was promoted to the jūryō division in May 2000. He lost his first seven bouts in his jūryō debut and after finishing with a 6–9 record he was demoted back to makushita. He won the jūryō division championship or yūshō in July 2001, coming through an unprecedented eight man playoff and with a mere 9–6 score – the lowest ever yūshō–winning record for a 15 day tournament. After his makuuchi debut in November 2001, Buyūzan rose quickly rose in the ranks, winning special prizes for Fighting Spirit in two consecutive tournaments. He was listed as maegashira 1 when he suffered a right knee medial collateral ligament injury in March 2002 and dropped back to the lower maegashira ranks and even further into the jūryō division. After his return to makuuchi, he remained in the middle and lower maegashira ranks. In 2005, he dropped to jūryō again, but he returned to the top division in March 2006. By September he had returned to jūryō where he put up a disastrous 1-14 record. He was demoted to the non-salaried makushita division in November 2006 where he again turned in a losing score. In January 2007 he managed a 6-1 mark which put him in contention for a return to jūryō, but he faltered again with three straight makekoshi scores. He remained in the makushita division until his retirement after a loss on Day 13 of the 2007 Kyushu basho which gave him another makekoshi. His top division career record was 167 wins against 196 losses with 12 injury absences, a winning percentage of .460.

== Retirement from sumo ==
Buyzūan has stayed in sumo as an elder of the Japan Sumo Association under the name Onaruto Oyakata, and works as a coach at Fujishima stable. His danpatsu-shiki, or official retirement ceremony, took place in October 2008. Upon Dejima's retirement in July 2009 he switched to the Sekinoto elder name. He became Yamawake Oyakata in September 2010 after the name was vacated by his former stablemate Wakanoyama. Among his duties in the Sumo Association is responsibility for the annual November tournament in Fukuoka.

== Fighting style ==
Like many wrestlers, Buyūzan favoured straightforward pushing techniques, winning most of his bouts by oshidashi (push out).

== Career record ==
Buyūzan Takeyoshi
Year	January Hatsu basho, Tokyo	March Haru basho, Osaka	May Natsu basho, Tokyo	July Nagoya basho, Nagoya	September Aki basho, Tokyo	November Kyūshū basho, Fukuoka
1997	x	Makushita tsukedashi #60; 4–3	East Makushita #52; 3–4	East Sandanme #2; 5–2	East Makushita #43; 5–2	East Makushita #25; 5–2
1998	West Makushita #13; 4–3	West Makushita #7; 2–5	East Makushita #20; 4–3	West Makushita #16; 6–1	East Makushita #3; 3–4	West Makushita #7; 4–3
1999	West Makushita #4; 3–4	East Makushita #8; 2–5	West Makushita #18; 4–3	East Makushita #13; 5–2	East Makushita #5; 4–3	West Makushita #3; 3–4
2000	West Makushita #7; 5–2	East Makushita #3; 5–2	West Jūryō #12; 6–9	West Makushita #3; 5–2	West Jūryō #8; 6–9	West Jūryō #10; 5–10
2001	West Makushita #2; 2–5	West Makushita #10; 5–2	East Makushita #4; 5–2	East Jūryō #12; 9–6–PPP; Champion	East Jūryō #8; 11–4	West Maegashira #15; 10–5; F
2002	East Maegashira #8; 11–4; F	East Maegashira #1; 0–3–12	West Maegashira #12; 6–9	West Maegashira #14; 10–5	West Maegashira #5; 5–10	East Maegashira #11; 4–11
2003	East Jūryō #2; 11–4–P	West Maegashira #10; 7–8	East Maegashira #12; 9–6	West Maegashira #6; 7–8	East Maegashira #7; 7–8	East Maegashira #8; 4–11
2004	West Maegashira #14; 10–5	East Maegashira #9; 8–7	East Maegashira #6; 4–11	East Maegashira #12; 8–7	West Maegashira #11; 8–7	West Maegashira #8; 5–10
2005	West Maegashira #13; 9–6	East Maegashira #10; 6–9	East Maegashira #12; 6–9	East Maegashira #15; 4–11	East Jūryō #3; 6–9	East Jūryō #6; 7–8
2006	West Jūryō #6; 10–5	East Maegashira #17; 8–7	East Maegashira #15; 7–8	West Maegashira #15; 4–11	West Jūryō #5; 1–14	West Makushita #2; 2–5
2007	East Makushita #12; 6–1	East Makushita #3; 3–4	East Makushita #7; 3–4	East Makushita #12; 2–5	West Makushita #26; 2–5	West Makushita #40; Retired; 3–4
Record given as wins–losses–absences Top division champion Top division runner-up Retired Lower divisions Non-participation Sanshō key: F=Fighting spirit; O=Outstanding performance; T=Technique Also shown: ★=Kinboshi; P=Playoff(s); Divisions: Makuuchi — Jūryō — Makushita — Sandanme — Jonidan — Jonokuchi Makuuchi ranks: Yokozuna — Ōzeki — Sekiwake — Komusubi — Maegashira

== See also ==
- Glossary of sumo terms
- List of sumo tournament second division champions
- List of past sumo wrestlers
- List of sumo elders
