= Wakanoyama Hiroshi =

Japanese sumo wrestler

Personal information
- Native name: 和歌乃山 洋
- Born: Hiroshi Nishizaki; May 12, 1972 (age 54) Wakayama, Japan
- Height: 1.77 m (5 ft 9 1/2 in)
- Weight: 166 kg (366 lb)

Sport
- Sport: Sumo
- Retired: September, 2005
- Heya: Musashigawa
- Record: 629-618-33
- Debut: March, 1988
- Highest rank: Komusubi (March, 2001)
- Elder name: Yamawake
- Championships: 2 (Jūryō); 3 (Makushita)
- Special Prizes: Fighting Spirit (1)
- Updated on June 2020

Wakanoyama Hiroshi (born May 12, 1972 as Hiroshi Nishizaki) is a former sumo wrestler from Gobo, Wakayama Prefecture, Japan. His highest rank was komusubi.

== Career ==
Wakanoyama made his professional debut in March 1988. Joining at the same time as him were future yokozuna Akebono, Takanohana and Wakanohana, and ōzeki Kaiō. He began wrestling under his own surname, Nishizaki, but from November 1989 onwards adopted the shikona of Wakanoyama, the name adapted from his home prefecture. He reached sekitori status in July 1991 upon promotion to the second highest jūryō division, and made his debut in the top makuuchi division in May 1992. However, he lasted only four tournaments there before being demoted back to jūryō. Although he reappeared in makuuchi once in September 1994, he could not stay there. In July 1996 he fell back to the unsalaried makushita division where he languished for thirteen tournaments, before winning promotion back to jūryō in November 1998 and makuuchi in July 1999.

Wakanoyama had been absent from the top division for 28 tournaments. No other wrestler had ever managed to return to makuuchi after so long away. His remarkable comeback may have been helped by the fact that during this period his stable, Musashigawa, had become one of the strongest in sumo, with a yokozuna (Musashimaru), and three soon to reach ōzeki (Musōyama, Dejima and Miyabiyama). Wakanoyama was certainly not short of strong training partners.

Wakanoyama was able to hold his own in the top division this time, rising slowly up the rankings. In March 2000, ranked at maegashira 1, he faced yokozuna Wakanohana on the opening day. The last time the two had fought was eight years previously in May 1992. This is the longest ever gap between meetings in the top division. Wakanoyama lost the match and fell short with a 6-9 record, but in January 2001 he scored 9-6 at maegashira 3 and won his first ever special prize. In the following tournament he was promoted to komusubi, the highest rank he was to achieve. He was the first non-foreign and non-college wrestler from his stable to reach a sanyaku rank. He would however lose the rank next tournament and slowly fade in rank over the next three years. Falling out of makuuchi in January 2004, he secured immediate re-promotion by winning the jūryō championship despite losing the initial bout of the three-way playoff. He then fought his last tournament in the top division in March 2004, and retired in September 2005 at the age of thirty three.

== Retirement from sumo ==
Wakanoyama remained in the sumo world as an elder, or oyakata, affiliated to Musashigawa stable where he worked as a coach under the name Yamawake-oyataka. However, he left the Sumo Association in September 2010.

== Fighting style ==
Wakanoyama was a pusher-thruster, preferring tsuki/oshi techniques to fighting on the mawashi. His most common winning kimarite was a straightforward oshi-dashi, or push out.

== Career record ==
Wakanoyama Hiroshi
Year	January Hatsu basho, Tokyo	March Haru basho, Osaka	May Natsu basho, Tokyo	July Nagoya basho, Nagoya	September Aki basho, Tokyo	November Kyūshū basho, Fukuoka
1988	x	(Maezumo)	West Jonokuchi #13; 4–3	West Jonidan #122; 5–2	West Jonidan #75; 6–1	West Jonidan #10; 3–4
1989	West Jonidan #27; 4–3	East Jonidan #6; 2–5	East Jonidan #38; 4–3	West Jonidan #12; 5–2	East Sandanme #72; 7–0–P	East Makushita #52; 3–4
1990	East Sandanme #7; 4–3	West Makushita #57; 5–2	East Makushita #35; 4–3	West Makushita #26; 3–4	East Makushita #35; 4–3	West Makushita #23; 5–2
1991	West Makushita #11; 3–4	East Makushita #16; 5–2	West Makushita #8; 7–0; Champion	West Jūryō #10; 6–9	West Jūryō #12; 8–7	East Jūryō #6; 8–7
1992	West Jūryō #5; 8–7	East Jūryō #3; 10–5	East Maegashira #12; 8–7	West Maegashira #9; 6–9	East Maegashira #12; 6–9	East Maegashira #15; 5–10
1993	East Jūryō #5; 7–8	West Jūryō #6; 9–6	East Jūryō #3; 9–6	East Jūryō #1; 6–9	West Jūryō #5; 3–12	East Makushita #1; 3–4
1994	West Makushita #5; 7–0; Champion	West Jūryō #10; 11–4	West Jūryō #5; 9–6	West Jūryō #1; 9–6	East Maegashira #16; 7–8	East Jūryō #1; 6–9
1995	East Jūryō #5; 6–9	East Jūryō #9; 9–6	East Jūryō #6; 8–7	West Jūryō #4; 3–12	East Makushita #1; 7–0; Champion	West Jūryō #9; 11–4–P; Champion
1996	East Jūryō #4; 8–7	East Jūryō #3; 8–7	West Jūryō #2; 4–11	East Jūryō #10; 4–11	West Makushita #3; 1–3–3	East Makushita #22; 5–2
1997	West Makushita #11; 5–2	East Makushita #5; 4–3	West Makushita #2; 2–5	West Makushita #11; Sat out due to injury 0–0–7	West Makushita #11; 3–4	East Makushita #17; 5–2
1998	East Makushita #9; 4–3	West Makushita #6; 3–4	East Makushita #11; 5–2	East Makushita #5; 5–2	East Makushita #2; 5–2	West Jūryō #13; 11–4
1999	West Jūryō #3; 7–8	West Jūryō #4; 10–5	West Jūryō #1; 10–5	West Maegashira #13; 8–7	East Maegashira #11; 9–6	East Maegashira #6; 7–8
2000	West Maegashira #7; 9–6	East Maegashira #1; 6–9	East Maegashira #2; 5–10	West Maegashira #4; 7–8	East Maegashira #6; 8–7	West Maegashira #1; 7–8
2001	East Maegashira #3; 9–6; F	West Komusubi #1; 6–9	East Maegashira #2; 2–6–7	East Maegashira #12; Sat out due to injury 0–0–15	East Maegashira #12; 8–7	West Maegashira #9; 6–9
2002	East Maegashira #12; 5–10	West Maegashira #15; 9–6	West Maegashira #7; 6–9	East Maegashira #10; 6–9	East Maegashira #12; 8–7	West Maegashira #9; 8–7
2003	East Maegashira #7; 8–7	East Maegashira #4; 4–11	West Maegashira #10; 6–9	West Maegashira #13; 7–8	West Maegashira #14; 7–8	East Jūryō #2; 4–11
2004	West Jūryō #6; 11–4–PPP; Champion	East Maegashira #16; 2–13	West Jūryō #8; 10–5	East Jūryō #2; 7–8	East Jūryō #3; 5–10	East Jūryō #7; 7–8
2005	East Jūryō #8; 7–7–1	West Jūryō #8; 8–7	West Jūryō #7; 8–7	West Jūryō #6; 3–12	East Makushita #1; Retired; 0–0–0	x
Record given as wins–losses–absences Top division champion Top division runner-up Retired Lower divisions Non-participation Sanshō key: F=Fighting spirit; O=Outstanding performance; T=Technique Also shown: ★=Kinboshi; P=Playoff(s); Divisions: Makuuchi — Jūryō — Makushita — Sandanme — Jonidan — Jonokuchi Makuuchi ranks: Yokozuna — Ōzeki — Sekiwake — Komusubi — Maegashira

== See also ==
- List of sumo tournament second division champions
- Glossary of sumo terms
- List of past sumo wrestlers
- List of komusubi
