= Wakaichirō Ken =

American sumo wrestler

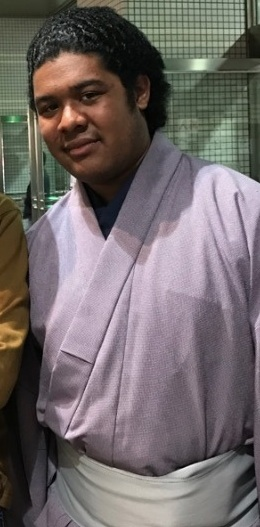
- Ken in 2017

Personal information
- Native name: 若一郎 健
- Born: Ichiro Kendrick Young; July 7, 1998 (age 28) Houston, Texas
- Height: 178 cm (5 ft 10 in)
- Weight: 115 kg (254 lb; 18 st 2 lb)

Sport
- Sport: Sumo
- Retired: February 2020
- Heya: Musashigawa
- Record: 70–63
- Debut: November, 2016
- Highest rank: Sandanme 32 (March, 2020)
- Updated on Feb 23, 2020

Wakaichirō Ken (若一郎 健; born July 7, 1998, as Ichiro Kendrick Young) is a former professional sumo wrestler with the Musashigawa stable from Houston, Texas. He retired after earning his highest career rank, sandanme 32.

== Background ==
Ichiro Kendrick Young was born in 1998 in Houston, Texas to a Japanese mother and African American father. Young did not have a sumo background before joining the professional sport. Although he played football until the age of 14, he then went to Quest Early College High School and gave up sports because of the academic workload. He graduated with an Associate degree in science and was considering becoming a pilot or joining the armed forces. However, his mother urged him to give sumo a try, regarding his short and stocky build as ideal. After a one-week trial period, he joined Musashigawa stable in November 2016 and was given the shikona of Wakaichirō, meaning Young Ichiro and hence a literal translation of his real name. Having spent summer vacations with his maternal grandparents in Nagasaki, that city was listed with the Japan Sumo Association as his hometown and his possession of Japanese nationality means he did not count against the Association's one-foreigner-per-heya quota.

== Career ==
Wakaichirō made his first appearance on the dohyo in November 2016, winning his three maezumo bouts. On his first official banzuke appearance in January 2017 at the rank of jonokuchi 17 he scored three wins against four losses. After a 5–2 result in March he was promoted to the jonidan division in May 2017 and had reached jonidan 4 by September. In November he was promoted to the sandanme division but scored only one win against six losses in this tournament. This dropped him again to jonidan, where a 5–2 result in the January 2018 tournament returned him to sandanme, a 3–4 record in March sent him back down and 4–3 in May back up again. In July he got his first winning record in sandanme, 4–3, but 2–5 records in September and November dropped him back down the banzuke. A 5–2 record in January 2019 returned him a fourth time to sandanme, but was followed by a 3–4 record in March that sent him back down again. However, a string of three tournament with winning records in May (5–2), July (4–3) and September (5–2) would return him sandanme and see him achieve his highest rank to date. After a 2–5 November tournament, he came back with a 5–2 record in January 2020 that earned him a career high ranking of sandanme 32 on the banzuke for the March 2020 tournament, but before the banzuke was released to the public, Wakaichirō retired without competing at that rank.

Wakaichirō left sumo in February 2020, having a retirement ceremony at his stable a few days after informing his stablemaster of his decision. He returned to Houston to seek a new career. His retirement left no Americans in professional sumo.

With a high-profile ex-yokozuna as its stablemaster, Musashigawa stable has had many visitors from other sports and as a consequence Wakaichirō met Max Holloway of the UFC and Michael Bennett of the Seattle Seahawks. Wakaichirō himself is a Houston Texans fan.

== Career record ==
Wakaichirō Ken
Year	January Hatsu basho, Tokyo	March Haru basho, Osaka	May Natsu basho, Tokyo	July Nagoya basho, Nagoya	September Aki basho, Tokyo	November Kyūshū basho, Fukuoka
2016	x	x	x	x	x	(Maezumo)
2017	West Jonokuchi #17; 3–4	West Jonokuchi #5; 5–2	East Jonidan #52; 4–3	East Jonidan #26; 4–3	West Jonidan #4; 4–3	West Sandanme #85; 1–6
2018	East Jonidan #23; 5–2	East Sandanme #89; 3–4	East Jonidan #14; 4–3	West Sandanme #94; 4–3	West Sandanme #77; 2–5	East Jonidan #5; 2–5
2019	East Jonidan #36; 5–2	West Sandanme #99; 3–4	West Jonidan #19; 5–2	East Sandanme #85; 4–3	East Sandanme #67; 5–2	East Sandanme #35; 2–5
2020	East Sandanme #64; 5–2	West Sandanme #32; Retired –	x	x	x	x
Record given as wins–losses–absences Top division champion Top division runner-up Retired Lower divisions Non-participation Sanshō key: F=Fighting spirit; O=Outstanding performance; T=Technique Also shown: ★=Kinboshi; P=Playoff(s); Divisions: Makuuchi — Jūryō — Makushita — Sandanme — Jonidan — Jonokuchi Makuuchi ranks: Yokozuna — Ōzeki — Sekiwake — Komusubi — Maegashira

== See also ==
- List of non-Japanese sumo wrestlers
