= 2002 in sumo =

The following are the events in professional sumo during 2002.

== Tournaments ==
=== Hatsu basho ===
Ryogoku Kokugikan, Tokyo, 13 January – 27 January

2002 Hatsu basho results - Makuuchi Division
W		L		A	East			Rank	West			W		L		A
1	-	3	-	11	ø	(United States)	Musashimaru	Y	ø	(Japan)	Takanohana	0	-	0	-	15
9	-	6	-	0		(Japan)	**Kaiō**	O		(Japan)	**Musōyama**	10	-	5	-	0
13	-	2	-	0		(Japan)	**Chiyotaikai**	O		(Japan)	**Tochiazuma***	13	-	2	-	0
12	-	3	-	0		(Japan)	**Kotomitsuki**	S		(Mongolia)	**Asashōryū**	8	-	7	-	0
0	-	0	-	15	ø	(Japan)	Miyabiyama	S	ø							
8	-	7	-	0		(Japan)	**Wakanosato**	K		(Mongolia)	Kyokutenhō	6	-	9	-	0
6	-	9	-	0		(Mongolia)	Kyokushūzan	M1		(Japan)	Akinoshima	6	-	9	-	0
3	-	12	-	0		(Japan)	Tamanoshima	M2		(Japan)	Tōki	6	-	9	-	0
5	-	10	-	0		(Japan)	Kaihō	M3		(Japan)	**Takanonami**	8	-	7	-	0
3	-	7	-	5	ø	(Japan)	Chiyotenzan	M4		(Japan)	Dejima	6	-	9	-	0
3	-	4	-	8	ø	(Japan)	Takanowaka	M5		(Japan)	**Kotonowaka**	8	-	7	-	0
8	-	7	-	0		(Japan)	**Tochinonada**	M6	ø	(Japan)	Hayateumi	0	-	0	-	15
9	-	6	-	0		(Japan)	**Tosanoumi**	M7		(Japan)	**Ōtsukasa**	8	-	7	-	0
11	-	4	-	0		(Japan)	**Buyūzan**	M8		(Japan)	Daizen	7	-	8	-	0
8	-	7	-	0		(Japan)	**Tamakasuga**	M9		(Japan)	Kōbō	3	-	12	-	0
9	-	6	-	0		(Japan)	**Aminishiki**	M10		(Japan)	Tamarikidō	4	-	11	-	0
11	-	4	-	0		(Japan)	**Tokitsuumi**	M11		(Japan)	Ōikari	5	-	10	-	0
5	-	10	-	0		(Japan)	Wakanoyama	M12		(Japan)	Asanowaka	3	-	12	-	0
7	-	8	-	0		(Japan)	Oginishiki	M13		(Japan)	**Hamanishiki**	8	-	7	-	0
9	-	6	-	0		(Japan)	**Tochisakae**	M14		(Japan)	Jūmonji	6	-	9	-	0
6	-	9	-	0		(United States)	Sentoryū	M15	ø							

ø - Indicates a pull-out or absent rank
**winning record in bold**
**Yusho Winner**
***Won Playoff**

=== Haru basho ===
Osaka Prefectural Gymnasium, Osaka, 10 March – 24 March

2002 Haru basho results - Makuuchi Division
W		L		A	East			Rank	West			W		L		A
13	-	2	-	0		(United States)	**Musashimaru**	Y	ø	(Japan)	Takanohana	0	-	0	-	15
10	-	5	-	0		(Japan)	**Tochiazuma**	O		(Japan)	Chiyotaikai	7	-	8	-	0
10	-	5	-	0		(Japan)	**Musōyama**	O		(Japan)	**Kaiō**	12	-	3	-	0
8	-	7	-	0		(Japan)	**Kotomitsuki**	S		(Mongolia)	**Asashōryū**	11	-	4	-	0
9	-	6	-	0		(Japan)	**Wakanosato**	K		(Japan)	Takanonami	6	-	9	-	0
0	-	3	-	12	ø	(Japan)	Buyūzan	M1		(Japan)	Tosanoumi	7	-	8	-	0
6	-	9	-	0		(Mongolia)	Kyokutenhō	M2		(Japan)	Kotonowaka	4	-	11	-	0
8	-	7	-	0		(Japan)	**Tochinonada**	M3		(Mongolia)	Kyokushūzan	2	-	13	-	0
7	-	8	-	0		(Japan)	Akinoshima	M4	ø	(Japan)	Tokitsuumi	2	-	6	-	7
8	-	7	-	0		(Japan)	**Tōki**	M5		(Japan)	Ōtsukasa	6	-	9	-	0
10	-	5	-	0		(Japan)	**Aminishiki**	M6	ø	(Japan)	Hayateumi	0	-	2	-	13
6	-	9	-	0		(Japan)	Dejima	M7		(Japan)	**Tamakasuga**	8	-	7	-	0
9	-	6	-	0		(Japan)	**Miyabiyama**	M8		(Japan)	Kaihō	7	-	8	-	0
6	-	9	-	0		(Japan)	Tamanoshima	M9		(Japan)	**Daizen**	9	-	6	-	0
5	-	10	-	0		(Japan)	Tochisakae	M10	ø	(Japan)	Chiyotenzan	0	-	0	-	15
7	-	8	-	0		(Japan)	Hamanishiki	M11		(Japan)	**Takanowaka**	11	-	4	-	0
6	-	9	-	0		(Japan)	Shimotori	M12		(Japan)	Ōikari	7	-	8	-	0
9	-	6	-	0		(Japan)	**Takamisakari**	M13	ø	(Japan)	Towanoyama	0	-	1	-	14
4	-	11	-	0		(Japan)	Oginishiki	M14		(Japan)	Takatōriki	6	-	9	-	0
4	-	11	-	0		(Japan)	Tamarikidō	M15		(Japan)	**Wakanoyama**	9	-	6	-	0

ø - Indicates a pull-out or absent rank
**winning record in bold**
**Yusho Winner**

=== Natsu basho ===
Ryogoku Kokugikan, Tokyo, 12 May – 26 May

2002 Natsu basho results - Makuuchi Division
W		L		A	East			Rank	West			W		L		A
13	-	2	-	0		(United States)	**Musashimaru**	Y	ø	(Japan)	Takanohana	0	-	0	-	15
11	-	4	-	0		(Japan)	**Kaiō**	O		(Japan)	**Tochiazuma**	10	-	5	-	0
9	-	5	-	1	ø	(Japan)	**Musōyama**	O		(Japan)	**Chiyotaikai**	11	-	4	-	0
11	-	4	-	0		(Mongolia)	**Asashōryū**	S	ø	(Japan)	Kotomitsuki	0	-	0	-	15
8	-	7	-	0		(Japan)	**Wakanosato**	K		(Japan)	Tochinonada	7	-	8	-	0
5	-	10	-	0		(Japan)	Aminishiki	M1		(Japan)	Tōki	4	-	11	-	0
4	-	11	-	0		(Japan)	Takanonami	M2		(Japan)	**Tosanoumi**	8	-	7	-	0
10	-	5	-	0		(Japan)	**Miyabiyama**	M3		(Japan)	Takanowaka	7	-	8	-	0
4	-	11	-	0		(Japan)	Daizen	M4		(Mongolia)	Kyokutenhō	6	-	9	-	0
3	-	12	-	0		(Japan)	Akinoshima	M5		(Japan)	Tamakasuga	7	-	8	-	0
9	-	6	-	0		(Japan)	**Kotonowaka**	M6		(Japan)	**Takamisakari**	8	-	7	-	0
7	-	8	-	0		(Japan)	Ōtsukasa	M7		(Japan)	Wakanoyama	6	-	9	-	0
8	-	7	-	0		(Japan)	**Kotoryū**	M8		(Japan)	**Kaihō**	8	-	7	-	0
9	-	6	-	0		(Japan)	**Dejima**	M9		(Japan)	Jūmonji	6	-	9	-	0
10	-	5	-	0		(Mongolia)	**Kyokushūzan**	M10		(Japan)	Chiyotenzan	5	-	10	-	0
0	-	0	-	15	ø	(Japan)	Tokitsuumi	M11		(Japan)	Tamanoshima	5	-	10	-	0
6	-	9	-	0		(Japan)	Hamanishiki	M12		(Japan)	Buyūzan	6	-	9	-	0
6	-	9	-	0		(Japan)	Ōikari	M13		(Japan)	Tochinohana	6	-	9	-	0
11	-	4	-	0		(Japan)	**Hokutōriki**	M14		(Japan)	**Shimotori**	10	-	5	-	0
8	-	7	-	0		(Japan)	**Tochisakae**	M15		(Japan)	Asanowaka	6	-	9	-	0

ø - Indicates a pull-out or absent rank
**winning record in bold**
**Yusho Winner**

=== Nagoya basho ===
Aichi Prefectural Gymnasium, Nagoya, 7 July – 21 July

2002 Nagoya basho results - Makuuchi Division
W		L		A	East			Rank	West			W		L		A
10	-	5	-	0		(United States)	**Musashimaru**	Y	ø	(Japan)	Takanohana	0	-	0	-	15
0	-	4	-	11	ø	(Japan)	Kaiō	O		(Japan)	**Chiyotaikai**	14	-	1	-	0
3	-	2	-	10	ø	(Japan)	Tochiazuma	O	ø	(Japan)	Musōyama	0	-	0	-	15
12	-	3	-	0		(Mongolia)	**Asashōryū**	S		(Japan)	**Wakanosato**	11	-	4	-	0
6	-	9	-	0		(Japan)	Miyabiyama	K		(Japan)	**Tosanoumi**	10	-	5	-	0
7	-	8	-	0		(Japan)	Tochinonada	M1	ø	(Japan)	Kotonowaka	2	-	9	-	4
9	-	6	-	0		(Japan)	**Takamisakari**	M2		(Mongolia)	Kyokushūzan	1	-	14	-	0
2	-	3	-	10	ø	(Japan)	Dejima	M3	ø	(Japan)	Kotoryū	0	-	0	-	15
7	-	8	-	0		(Japan)	Takanowaka	M4	ø	(Japan)	Kaihō	5	-	8	-	2
6	-	9	-	0		(Japan)	Aminishiki	M5		(Japan)	Hokutōriki	7	-	8	-	0
6	-	7	-	2	ø	(Japan)	Tamakasuga	M6		(Japan)	Kotomitsuki	7	-	8	-	0
8	-	7	-	0		(Japan)	**Tōki**	M7		(Japan)	**Takanonami**	9	-	6	-	0
8	-	7	-	0		(Mongolia)	**Kyokutenhō**	M8		(Japan)	**Shimotori**	9	-	6	-	0
5	-	10	-	0		(Japan)	Ōtsukasa	M9		(Japan)	Daizen	6	-	9	-	0
6	-	9	-	0		(Japan)	Wakanoyama	M10	ø	(Japan)	**Tochisakae**	9	-	3	-	3
8	-	7	-	0		(Japan)	**Tokitsuumi**	M11		(Japan)	Akinoshima	6	-	9	-	0
5	-	10	-	0		(Japan)	Jūmonji	M12	ø	(Japan)	Aogiyama	6	-	7	-	2
6	-	9	-	0		(Japan)	Hayateumi	M13		(Japan)	Chiyotenzan	5	-	10	-	0
4	-	11	-	0		(Japan)	Hamanishiki	M14		(Japan)	**Buyūzan**	10	-	5	-	0
7	-	8	-	0		(Japan)	Ōikari	M15		(Japan)	**Tamanoshima**	11	-	4	-	0

ø - Indicates a pull-out or absent rank
**winning record in bold**
**Yusho Winner**

=== Aki basho ===
Ryogoku Kokugikan, Tokyo, 8 September – 22 September

2002 Aki basho results - Makuuchi Division
W		L		A	East			Rank	West			W		L		A
13	-	2	-	0		(United States)	**Musashimaru**	Y		(Japan)	**Takanohana**	12	-	3	-	0
10	-	5	-	0		(Japan)	**Chiyotaikai**	O	ø	(Japan)	Tochiazuma	0	-	0	-	15
12	-	3	-	0		(Japan)	**Kaiō**	O		(Japan)	**Musōyama**	8	-	7	-	0
10	-	5	-	0		(Mongolia)	**Asashōryū**	O	ø							
8	-	7	-	0		(Japan)	**Wakanosato**	S		(Japan)	Tosanoumi	6	-	9	-	0
4	-	11	-	0		(Japan)	Takamisakari	K		(Japan)	Takanonami	7	-	8	-	0
7	-	8	-	0		(Japan)	Miyabiyama	M1		(Japan)	Tochinonada	4	-	11	-	0
5	-	10	-	0		(Japan)	Shimotori	M2		(Japan)	Tōki	4	-	11	-	0
8	-	7	-	0		(Mongolia)	**Kyokutenhō**	M3		(Japan)	Kotoryū	5	-	10	-	0
2	-	9	-	4	ø	(Japan)	Tochisakae	M4		(Japan)	**Takanowaka**	8	-	7	-	0
8	-	7	-	0		(Japan)	**Tamanoshima**	M5		(Japan)	Buyūzan	5	-	10	-	0
9	-	6	-	0		(Japan)	**Hokutōriki**	M6		(Japan)	Tokitsuumi	7	-	8	-	0
12	-	3	-	0		(Japan)	**Kotomitsuki**	M7		(Japan)	Aminishiki	7	-	8	-	0
0	-	0	-	15	ø	(Japan)	Kaihō	M8		(Japan)	**Tamakasuga**	10	-	5	-	0
0	-	0	-	15	ø	(Japan)	Kotonowaka	M9		(Japan)	**Gojōrō**	8	-	7	-	0
0	-	0	-	15	ø	(Japan)	Dejima	M10		(Japan)	Kasuganishiki	5	-	10	-	0
4	-	11	-	0		(Japan)	Daizen	M11		(Mongolia)	**Kyokushūzan**	9	-	6	-	0
8	-	7	-	0		(Japan)	**Wakanoyama**	M12		(Japan)	Ōtsukasa	5	-	10	-	0
7	-	8	-	0		(Japan)	Akinoshima	M13		(Japan)	Asanowaka	7	-	8	-	0
8	-	7	-	0		(Japan)	**Tochinohana**	M14	ø	(Japan)	Aogiyama	0	-	0	-	15
9	-	6	-	0		(Japan)	**Ushiomaru**	M15	ø							

ø - Indicates a pull-out or absent rank
**winning record in bold**
**Yusho Winner**

=== Kyushu basho ===
Fukuoka International Centre, Kyushu, 10 November – 24 November

2002 Kyushu basho results - Makuuchi Division
W		L		A	East			Rank	West			W		L		A
4	-	2	-	9	ø	(United States)	Musashimaru	Y	ø	(Japan)	Takanohana	0	-	0	-	15
2	-	2	-	11	ø	(Japan)	Kaiō	O	ø	(Japan)	Chiyotaikai	6	-	3	-	6
14	-	1	-	0		(Mongolia)	**Asashōryū**	O		(Japan)	**Musōyama**	10	-	5	-	0
8	-	7	-	0		(Japan)	**Tochiazuma**	O	ø							
7	-	8	-	0		(Japan)	Wakanosato	S		(Japan)	**Kotomitsuki**	8	-	7	-	0
7	-	8	-	0		(Mongolia)	Kyokutenhō	K		(Japan)	**Takanowaka**	11	-	4	-	0
10	-	5	-	0		(Japan)	**Takanonami**	M1		(Japan)	**Tosanoumi**	8	-	7	-	0
8	-	7	-	0		(Japan)	**Miyabiyama**	M2		(Japan)	Hokutōriki	5	-	10	-	0
2	-	13	-	0		(Japan)	Tamakasuga	M3		(Japan)	Tamanoshima	5	-	10	-	0
5	-	10	-	0		(Japan)	Takamisakari	M4		(Japan)	Gojōrō	4	-	11	-	0
7	-	8	-	0		(Mongolia)	Kyokushūzan	M5		(Japan)	Shimotori	7	-	8	-	0
6	-	9	-	0		(Japan)	Tochinonada	M6		(Japan)	Kotoryū	7	-	8	-	0
9	-	6	-	0		(Japan)	**Tōki**	M7		(Japan)	**Tokitsuumi**	8	-	7	-	0
8	-	7	-	0		(Japan)	**Kaihō**	M8		(Japan)	**Aminishiki**	9	-	6	-	0
10	-	5	-	0		(Japan)	**Kotonowaka**	M9		(Japan)	**Wakanoyama**	8	-	7	-	0
10	-	5	-	0		(Japan)	**Dejima**	M10	ø	(Japan)	Ushiomaru	3	-	7	-	5
4	-	11	-	0		(Japan)	Buyūzan	M11		(Japan)	**Iwakiyama**	10	-	5	-	0
6	-	9	-	0		(Japan)	Tochinohana	M12	ø	(Japan)	Tochisakae	0	-	6	-	9
6	-	9	-	0		(Japan)	Tamarikidō	M13		(Japan)	**Jūmonji**	8	-	7	-	0
9	-	6	-	0		(Japan)	**Akinoshima**	M14		(Japan)	Aogiyama	6	-	9	-	0
5	-	10	-	0		(Japan)	Asanowaka	M15	ø							

ø - Indicates a pull-out or absent rank
**winning record in bold**
**Yusho Winner**

== News ==
=== January ===
- 13–27: At the Hatsu basho in Tokyo, ozeki Tochiazuma wins his first top makuuchi division championship in his debut tournament at the rank, exactly 30 years after his father won his only championship. He is the first ozeki to win the yusho in his debut since Kiyokuni in 1969, and is the first wrestler since Haguroyama to win a championship in all six professional sumo divisions. He defeats fellow ozeki Chiyotaikai in a playoff after both men finish on 13–2. Yokozuna Takanohana is missing for the fourth straight basho, and Musashimaru pulls out early through injury. Special prizes are awarded to Kotomitsuki and Tokitsuumi for Technique, and to Buyuzan for Fighting Spirit. The juryo division championship is won by Takamisakari after a playoff with Shimotori. As a result, Takamisakari returns to the top division for the first time since being injured in the September 2000 tournament. The makushita championship goes to South Korea's Kasugao. Former maegashira Asanosho retires after falling into the fourth sandanme division.

=== February ===
- 1: Former Yokozuna Kitanoumi takes over as chairman of the Japan Sumo Association from Tokitsukaze Oyakata (the former ozeki Yutakayama), who will be reaching the mandatory retirement age of 65 in August.
- 5: Takasago Oyakata, the former komusubi Fujinishiki, and Wakamatsu Oyakata, the former ozeki Asashio, swap toshiyori names. Due to Fujinishiki's poor health, the Takasago stable is absorbed into Wakamatsu stable with Asashio continuing as the head.

=== March ===
- 10–24: Musashimaru comes back to win his tenth championship with a 13–2 score. Runner-up is ozeki Kaio. Sekiwake Asashoryu scores 11–4 and wins the Outstanding Performance Award. Takanowaka also finishes on 11–4 and is awarded the Fighting Spirit prize. Aminishiki receives the Technique prize. Tochiazuma wins ten bouts while Chiyotaikai records a make-koshi 7–8. Former maegashira Kotoryu and Gojoro win the juryo and makushita division championships. Another former maegashira, Daishi, announces his retirement.

=== May ===
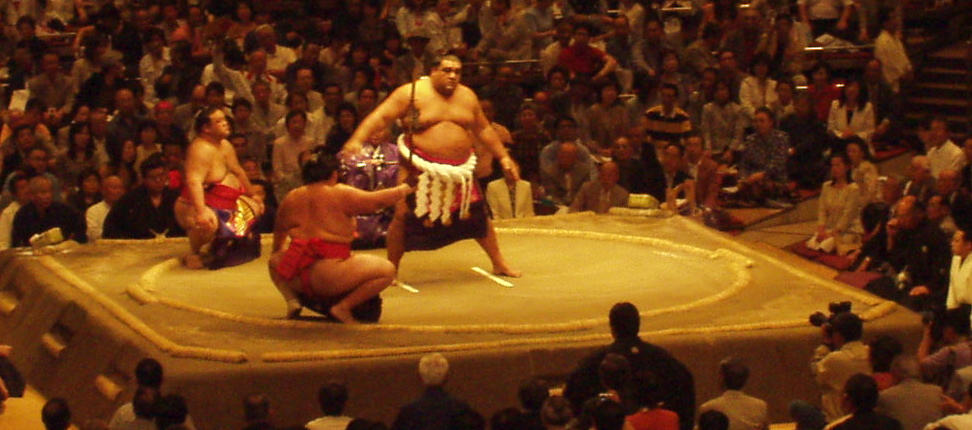
Musashimaru won three tournaments in 2002.

- 12–26: Musashimaru wins his second tournament in a row, and 11th overall, again scoring 13–2. Kaio, Chiyotaikai and Asashoryu all finish as runners-up on 11–4. Asashoryu receives the Fighting Spirit prize, as does Hokutoriki, who also wins eleven in his debut top division tournament. Kyokushuzan wins his second Technique Award, five years after his first. Takanohana is absent for the sixth straight tournament. The juryo championship goes to Iwakiyama, and the makushita yusho to Toyozakura, who returns to the sekitori ranks for the first time in over a year. Joining him is Kasugao, who becomes the first sekitori to officially represent South Korea.

=== June ===
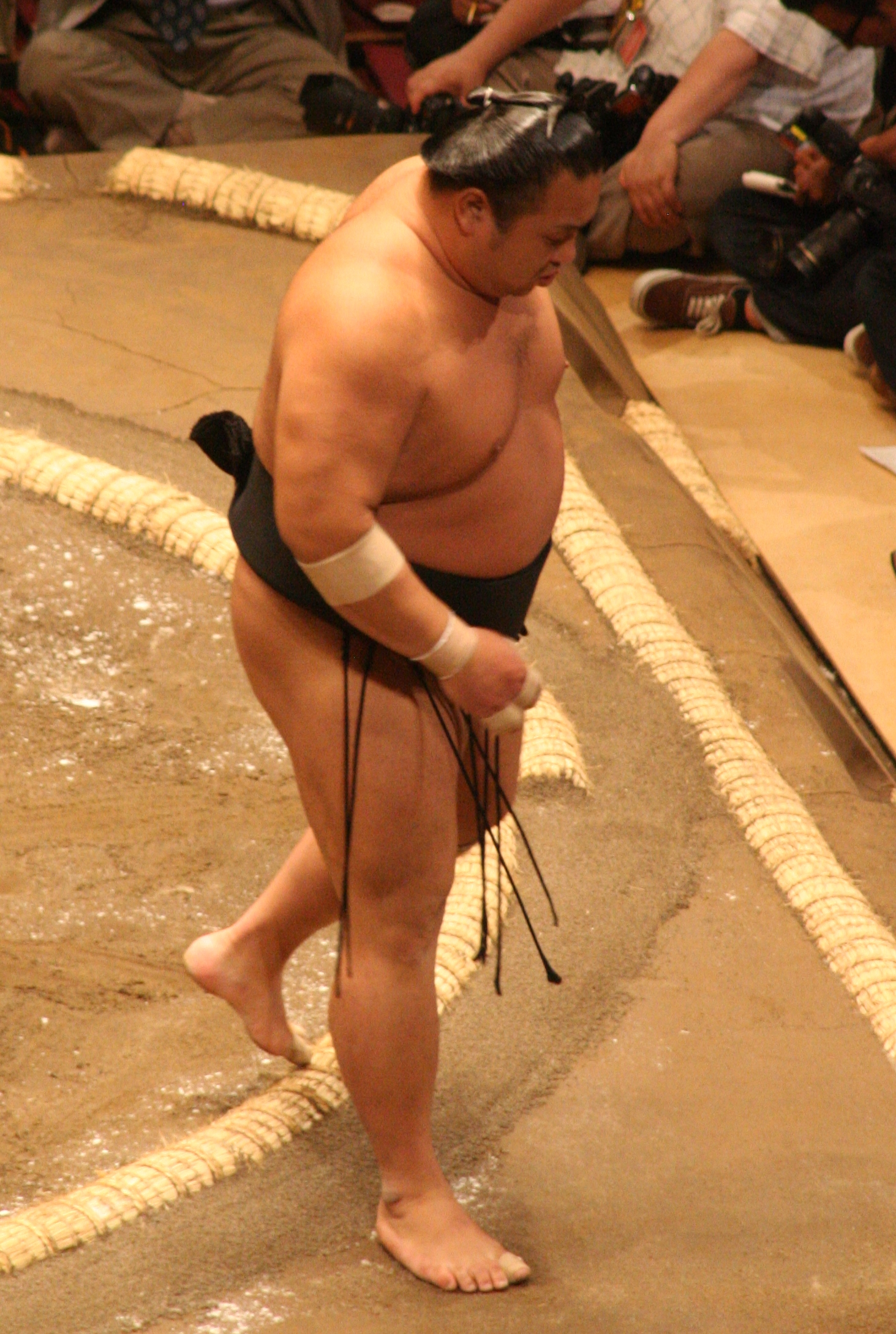
Chiyotaikai was a tournament winner in July.

- 1: Arashio Oyakata, the former komusubi Oyutaka, branches out from Tokitsukaze stable and opens his own Arashio stable.

=== July ===
- 7–21: Takanohana, who had been expected to make his long-awaited comeback from knee surgery in this tournament, pulls out yet again. The Sumo Association respond by saying if he does not compete in September, he will be obliged to retire. Musashimaru and Chiyotaikai are the only men ranked above sekiwake who make it through the whole 15 days—Kaio pulls out on Day 3, Tochiazuma on Day 4 and Musoyama is missing altogether. Chiyotaikai takes advantage to win his second championship with a 14–1 record. It is his first yusho since the January 1999 triumph that saw him promoted to ozeki. Musashimaru finishes with a below par 10–5 score. Asashoryu is runner-up with a fine 12–3 record and is promoted to ozeki after the tournament. He also shares the Outstanding Performance Award along with Tosanoumi. Takamisakari wins the Technique Prize and Shimotori gets the Fighting Spirit Award. Ushiomaru wins the juryo yusho while the makushita title goes to former maegashira Kinkaiyama.

=== August ===
- 18: Tokitsukaze Oyakata turns 65 and retires. He passes on control of the Tokitsukaze stable to former komusubi Futatsuryu.

=== September ===
- 8–22: After an unprecedented seven tournaments in a row out injured, Takanohana returns to the dohyo. Understandably rusty, he is defeated twice inside the first five days by Kyokutenho and Kotoryu but then wins nine in a row, including a memorable victory over new ozeki Asashoryu by a powerful uwatenage outer-arm throw. He and Musashimaru both enter the final day level on 12–2. Musashimaru wins the yusho decider to claim his 12th (and final) championship. Kaio and Kotomitsuki are also runner-up on 12–3, while Asashoryu and Chiyotaikai finish on 10–5. Musoyama returns to eke out an 8–7 record, but Tochiazuma misses the tournament and will be in danger of demotion in November. Only one special prize is given out, to Kotomitsuki for Fighting Spirit. In the juryo division, two veteran former sekiwake announce their retirements: Terao, whose 1795 career matches are the second highest in history, and Takatoriki, who did not miss a single bout in his career. Former maegashira Minatofuji also retires. The juryo championship goes to Tamarikido.

=== November ===
- 10–24: At the Kyushu tournament, Musashimaru withdraws on the fifth day after injuring his wrist. Kaio and Chiyotaikai also withdraw early, while Takanohana is missing from the start after a recurrence of his knee problem. In their absence, Asashoryu takes his first championship with a 14–1 record. In the juryo division, Kasugao wins the yusho, making it the first time in history that championships in the top two divisions have both been won by foreigners in the same tournament. Komusubi Takanowaka finishes as runner-up to Asashoryu on 11–4. Tochiazuma keeps his rank with an 8–7 record. Three wrestlers share the Fighting Spirit Prize: Takanowaka, former ozeki Takanonami, and Iwakiyama.

=== December ===
- 1: Former sekiwake Mitoizumi leaves Takasago stable to open his own Nishikido stable. As Takasago stable now uses Wakamatsu stable's facilities, he uses the old Takasago premises.
- 10: Following the success of the 2002 World Cup which was jointly held by Japan and South Korea, The Sumo Association announces plans to hold an exhibition tournament there next year, which will be the first trip to Asia since a tour of China in 1973. Korean Kasugaō is currently in the jūryō division.
- 24: Kabutoyama stable, which opened in 1989, shuts down. Its head coach, former maegashira Daiyu, moves to Minato stable.

== Deaths ==
- Former sekiwake Kitanonada (also former Takekuma Oyakata), aged 78.

== See also ==
- Glossary of sumo terms
- List of past sumo wrestlers
- List of years in sumo
- List of yokozuna
