= Musashigawa stable (2013) =

Organization of sumo wrestlers

Coordinates: 35.7128°N 139.8643°E

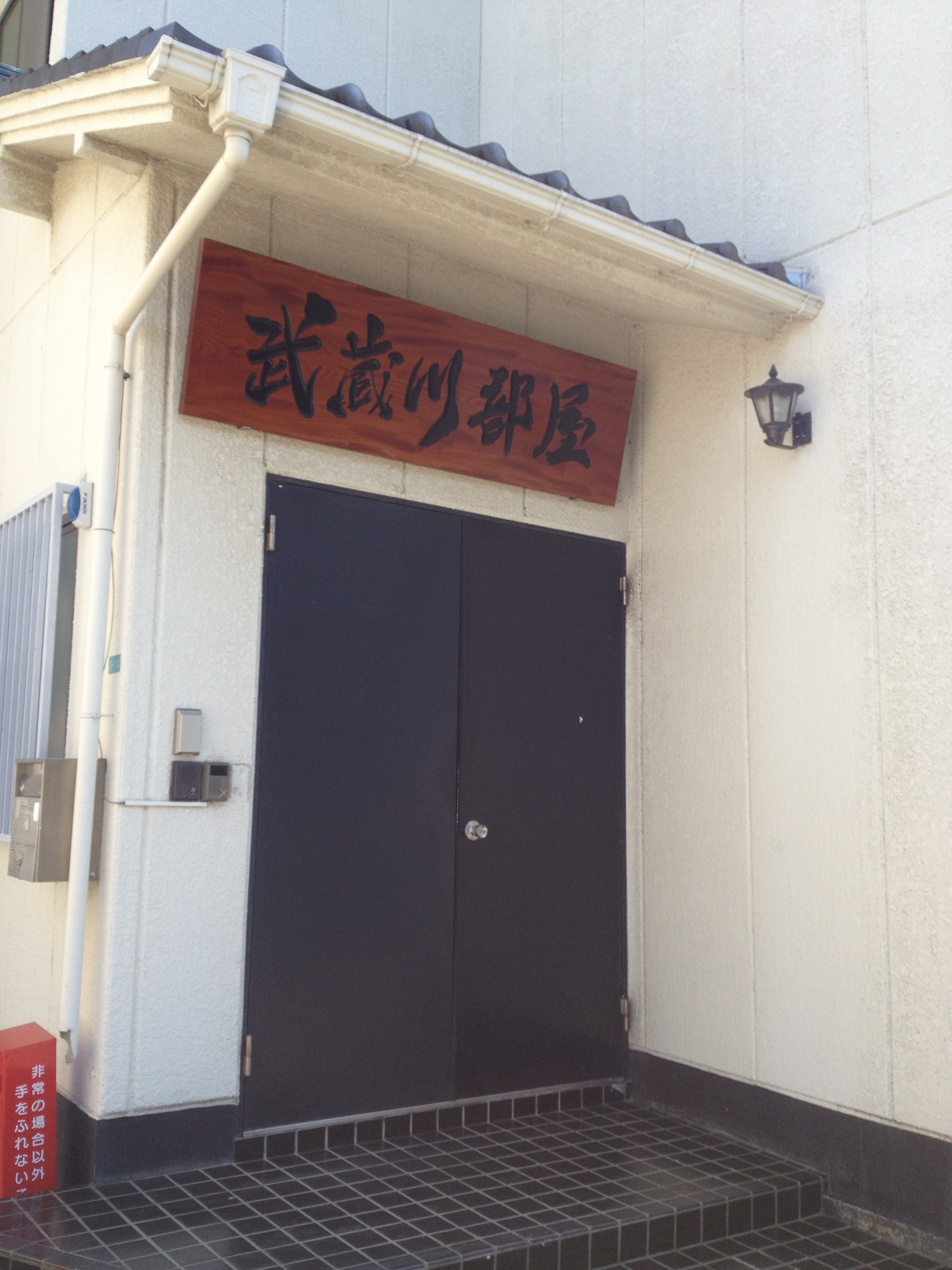
Musashigawa stable (2014)

The Musashigawa stable (Japanese: 武蔵川部屋, Hepburn: Musashigawa-beya) is a stable of sumo wrestlers, part of the Dewanoumi ichimon or group of stables. It is an off-shoot of the better known stable of the same name set up by former yokozuna Mienoumi in 1981, which is currently known as Fujishima stable. Former yokozuna Musashimaru branched off from that stable in April 2013 after taking on the elder name of his former head coach and started a new stable using the Musashigawa name. It is located in the same building as the defunct Nakamura stable.

Musashigawa stable is the second stable in sumo history to be founded by a foreign-born former sumo wrestler after Takamiyama's Azumazeki stable. The head coach's nephew, Fiamalu Penitani, was a wrestler at the stable under the shikona of Musashikuni, reaching the makushita division, but he retired in 2019 due to injury problems. The stable was also home to the half Japanese, half African-American wrestler Ichiro Young (Wakaichiro). Musashigawa stable began with just four wrestlers, but had expanded to 19 by May 2019.

As of May 2026, the stable has 14 active wrestlers.

== Owner ==
- 2013–present: 15th Musashigawa (iin, the 67th yokozuna Musashimaru, born 1971)

== Notable active wrestlers ==
- None

== Referee ==
- Kimura Keitaro (sandanme gyōji, real name Keita Akiba, born 2001)

== Hairdresser ==
- Tokoken (first class tokoyama, born 1974)

== Location and access ==
Tokyo, Edogawa Ward, Chūō 4–1–10
10 minute walk from Shin-Koiwa Station on Sōbu Line

== See also ==
- List of sumo stables
- List of active sumo wrestlers
- List of past sumo wrestlers
- Glossary of sumo terms
