= Mienoumi Tsuyoshi =

Japanese sumo wrestler

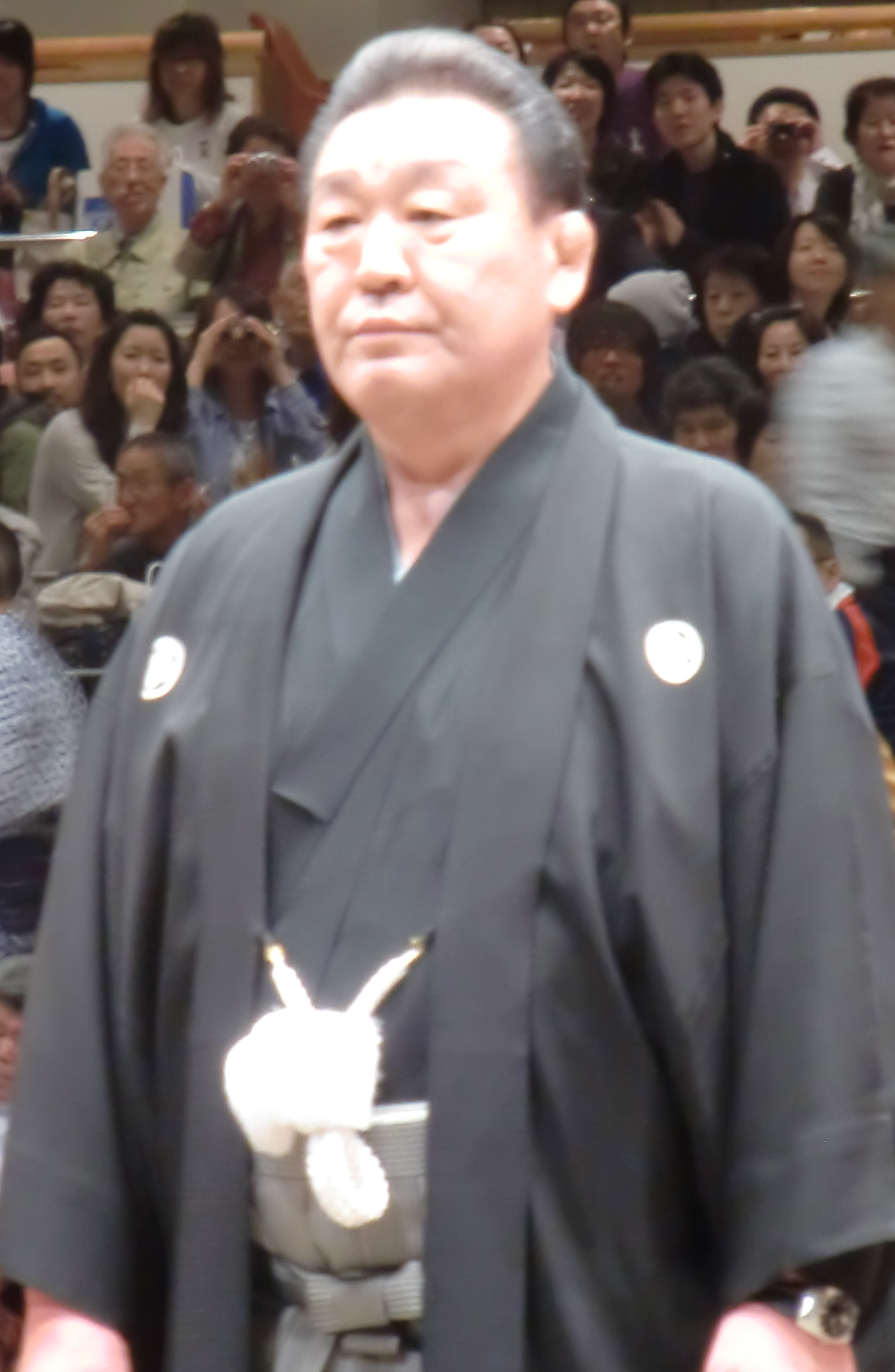
- Mienoumi in 2010

Personal information
- Native name: 三重ノ海 剛司
- Born: Gorō Ishiyama; February 4, 1948 (age 78) Matsusaka, Mie, Allied-occupied Japan
- Height: 1.81 m (5 ft 11 1/2 in)
- Weight: 135 kg (298 lb)

Sport
- Sport: Sumo
- Retired: November, 1980
- Heya: Dewanoumi
- Record: 695–525–56 (1 draw)
- Debut: July, 1963
- Highest rank: Yokozuna (July, 1979)
- Elder name: Musashigawa
- Championships: 3 (Makuuchi); 1 (Sandanme)
- Special Prizes: Outstanding Performance (5); Fighting Spirit (1); Technique (3)
- Gold Stars: (5); Wajima (2); Kitanoumi; Kotozakura; Kitanofuji
- Updated on June 2020

Mienoumi Tsuyoshi (Japanese: 三重ノ海 剛司, Hepburn: Mienoumi Tsuyoshi; born February 4, 1948 as Gorō Ishiyama (石山五郎, Ishiyama Gorō)) is a Japanese former professional sumo wrestler from Matsusaka, Mie. He was the 57th yokozuna of the sport. After retiring he founded the Musashigawa stable and was a chairman of the Japan Sumo Association. He was the first rikishi in history who was demoted from the rank of Ozeki but still managed the promotion to Yokozuna.

== Career ==
His father was a construction worker who competed in amateur sumo tournaments. The young Mienoumi did judo in junior high school and was introduced to a sumo coach at Dewanoumi stable, but was initially rejected due to his short stature. He contacted the stable again a few years later, and this time was accepted by Dewanoumi Oyataka himself, the former Dewanohana Kuniichi. His first bout was in July 1963, aged just 15. At first fighting under his real name, he took on the shikona of Mienoumi in July 1966, but did not adopt the Tsuyoshi given name until September 1976. After being personally trained by the new Dewanoumi Oyakaya, former yokozuna Sadanoyama, he developed his technique and was promoted to the jūryō division in March 1969, and makuuchi, the top division, in September 1969. In July of the following year, he reached the rank of komusubi, defeating two yokozuna (Taihō and Tamanoumi) and receiving his first prize for Outstanding Performance. He was promoted to sekiwake in the next tournament in September 1970.

Mienoumi suffered from a chronic liver problem throughout his career, and although he tried to keep it under control by changing his diet, it was a factor in his eventual retirement.

In September 1974, his 11th day match with maegashira Futagodake was declared a draw (hikiwake) after multiple water breaks (mizu-iri) and a rematch (torinaoshi) failed to yield any progress. This was the first draw to be called in makuuchi since September 1963, and to date stands as the last such occurrence. Mienoumi won his first makuuchi tournament or yūshō in November 1975 and was promoted to ōzeki the following January. At the time of his promotion, he was the first ōzeki from Mie Prefecture to be promoted since the first Sakaigawa in 1857, 119 earlier. He lost a majority of bouts in the next two tournaments, resulting in an automatic demotion back to sekiwake, but a good result of 10 wins to 5 losses in the next tournament was sufficient to restore him to ōzeki.

In May 1979 he was a runner-up for the fourth time, to Wakanohana with a 13–2 record. He followed that up with a superb 14–1 record in the following tournament, defeating Wakanohana, Kitanoumi and Wajima, only losing the championship in a playoff to Wajima on the final day. In September 1979 he was finally promoted to yokozuna. The 97 tournaments it took him to do so is the slowest ever progress to sumo's top rank. His oyakata declared that he would be happy with just one more yūshō before Mienoumi's retirement. In the event, Mienoumi won his second and third tournaments as yokozuna, the latter with a perfect record, but after this had several absences due to injury and illness, fighting a full fifteen bouts in only four tournaments as yokozuna, before retiring in November 1980. He has the lowest win–loss ratio of any post-war yokozuna.

== After retirement ==
Upon retirement Mienoumi took the name of Musashigawa Oyakata and established Musashigawa stable in 1981. Until then Dewanoumi stable had discouraged any breaking away, and he was the first from Dewanoumi in 62 years to amicably set up a new stable. By 2000 Musashigawa stable had become one of the strongest stables in sumo with a yokozuna, Musashimaru, and three ōzeki, Dejima, Musōyama and Miyabiyama. Musashigawa performed an early kanreki dohyō-iri in 2007 (normally performed on a yokozuna's 60th birthday) to mark the 25th anniversary of the founding of Musashigawa stable. On September 8, 2008, he became the chairman of the Japan Sumo Association following the resignation of Kitanoumi. One of his first actions was to demand a controversial tightening up of the rules for the tachi-ai, or initial charge, which led to many false starts in the September 2008 tournament. Following a series of scandals involving wrestlers gambling and associating with organised crime members, he was suspended for the July 2010 tournament and announced his resignation the following month. He also cited health concerns, as he had been undergoing treatment for stomach cancer. In September 2010 he also stood down as head of Musashigawa stable, although he remained a coach there. Former ōzeki Musōyama is now head coach of what is now Fujishima stable. In December 2012 he announced that the former Musashimaru would inherit his elder name when Musashigawa reached 65 years of age in February 2013. Upon retiring he became the director of the Sumo Museum at the Ryōgoku Kokugikan, a position he held for exactly ten years before stepping down in February 2023 on the occasion of his 75th birthday. He remarked upon his pride at being in the sumo world for 60 years, and that eight of his disciples were currently elders of the Sumo Association.

== Family ==
Mienoumi was married in September 1974.

== Fighting style ==
Mienoumi was a yotsu-sumo wrestler who preferred grappling techniques to pushing or thrusting. His favourite grip on his opponent's mawashi was hidari-yotsu, a left hand inside and right hand outside position. He regularly won by yori-kiri (force out) and uwatedashinage (pulling overarm throw).

== Career record ==
Mienoumi Tsuyoshi
Year	January Hatsu basho, Tokyo	March Haru basho, Osaka	May Natsu basho, Tokyo	July Nagoya basho, Nagoya	September Aki basho, Tokyo	November Kyūshū basho, Fukuoka
1963	x	x	x	(Maezumō)	(Maezumō)	East Jonokuchi #30; 4–3
1964	East Jonidan #102; 4–3	West Jonidan #81; 3–4	West Jonidan #98; 2–1–4	East Jonidan #112; 5–2	East Jonidan #57; 3–4	West Jonidan #66; 3–4
1965	West Jonidan #88; 5–2	East Jonidan #39; 2–5	East Jonidan #61; 5–2	East Jonidan #8; 3–4	East Jonidan #13; 4–3	West Sandanme #88; 5–2
1966	East Sandanme #52; 1–6	West Sandanme #83; 2–5	East Jonidan #10; 3–3–1	East Jonidan #23; 5–2	East Sandanme #80; 5–2	East Sandanme #39; 4–3
1967	East Sandanme #30; 5–2	West Makushita #98; 4–3	East Sandanme #27; 5–2	West Makushita #57; 3–4	East Sandanme #5; 7–0; Champion	East Makushita #11; 3–4
1968	West Makushita #15; 3–4	East Makushita #18; 4–3	West Makushita #13; 4–3	West Makushita #8; 4–3	West Makushita #6; 2–5	West Makushita #16; 6–1
1969	East Makushita #5; 6–1	East Jūryō #12; 9–6	West Jūryō #7; 10–5	East Jūryō #3; 9–6	East Maegashira #11; 8–7	East Maegashira #5; 8–7
1970	West Maegashira #3; 4–11	West Maegashira #9; 8–7	West Maegashira #6; 11–4	West Komusubi #1; 8–7; O	West Sekiwake; 6–9	West Maegashira #1; 5–10
1971	West Maegashira #3; 6–9	West Maegashira #4; 5–10	East Maegashira #11; 10–5	West Maegashira #3; 7–8	East Maegashira #4; 10–5; F	West Komusubi #1; 11–4; T
1972	East Sekiwake #1; 8–7	West Sekiwake #2; 8–7	West Sekiwake #2; 9–6	East Sekiwake #2; 5–2–8	East Maegashira #1; 4–11	East Maegashira #7; 8–7
1973	West Maegashira #3; 11–4; O★	West Komusubi #1; 10–5; T	West Sekiwake #1; 8–7	West Sekiwake #1; 4–11	West Maegashira #2; 8–7 ★	West Maegashira #1; 4–11
1974	East Maegashira #6; 8–7	West Maegashira #3; 8–7	East Maegashira #1; 5–9–1	West Maegashira #5; 5–10	West Maegashira #10; 11–3–1draw	East Maegashira #2; 5–10
1975	West Maegashira #6; 10–5; O★★	East Maegashira #1; 11–4; O★	West Sekiwake #1; 9–6	East Sekiwake #1; 8–7	East Sekiwake #2; 11–4	East Sekiwake #1; 13–2; OT
1976	East Ōzeki #1; 8–7	West Ōzeki #1; 2–6–7	East Ōzeki #2; 2–8–5	West Sekiwake #2; 10–5	East Ōzeki #2; 9–6	East Ōzeki #2; 8–7
1977	East Ōzeki #2; 8–7	West Ōzeki #2; 8–7	East Ōzeki #3; 5–10	East Ōzeki #3; 8–7	West Ōzeki #2; 7–8	West Ōzeki #2; 9–6
1978	East Ōzeki #2; 10–5	West Ōzeki #1; 8–7	East Ōzeki #2; 11–4	East Ōzeki #1; 9–6	East Ōzeki #1; 10–5	East Ōzeki #1; 10–5
1979	East Ōzeki #1; 11–4	East Ōzeki #1; 10–5	East Ōzeki #1; 13–2	East Ōzeki #1; 14–1–P	East Yokozuna #2; 11–4	West Yokozuna-Ōzeki #1; 14–1
1980	East Yokozuna #1; 15–0	East Yokozuna #1; 1–4–10	West Yokozuna #2; 10–5	West Yokozuna #2; 4–6–5	East Yokozuna #2; Sat out due to injury 0–0–15	West Yokozuna #2; Retired; 0–3
Record given as wins–losses–absences Top division champion Top division runner-up Retired Non-participation Jūryō Lower divisions Sanshō key: F=Fighting spirit; O=Outstanding performance; T=Technique Also shown: ★=Kinboshi; P=Playoff(s); Divisions: Makuuchi — Jūryō — Makushita — Sandanme — Jonidan — Jonokuchi Makuuchi ranks: Yokozuna — Ōzeki — Sekiwake — Komusubi — Maegashira

== See also ==
- Glossary of sumo terms
- Kanreki dohyo-iri
- List of past sumo wrestlers
- List of sumo tournament top division champions
- List of sumo tournament top division runners-up
- List of yokozuna

Preceded by Wakanohana Kanji II	57th Yokozuna; 1979–1980	Succeeded by Chiyonofuji Mitsugu
Yokozuna is not a successive rank, and more than one wrestler can hold the title at once

Sporting positions
Preceded by Kitanoumi Toshimitsu	Chairman of the Japan Sumo Association; 2008–2010	Succeeded by Kaiketsu Masateru
