= Dejima Takeharu =

Japanese sumo wrestler

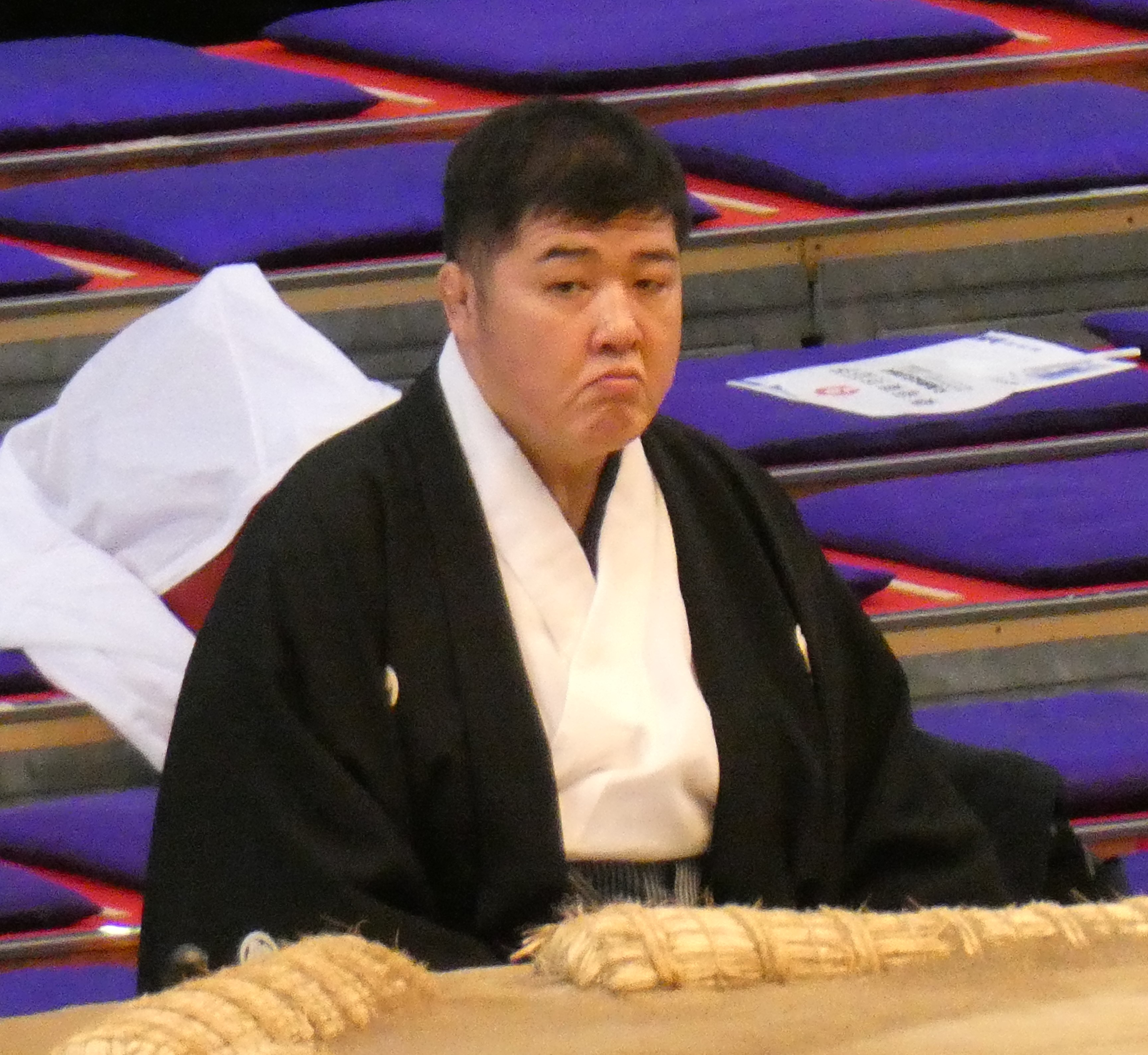

Personal information
- Native name: 出島 武春
- Born: Dejima Takeharu; March 21, 1974 (age 52) Ishikawa, Japan
- Height: 1.80 m (5 ft 11 in)
- Weight: 160 kg (353 lb)

Sport
- Sport: Sumo
- University team: Chuo University
- Retired: July 2009
- Heya: Musashigawa
- Record: 595–495–98
- Debut: March 1996
- Highest rank: Ōzeki (September 1999)
- Elder name: Ōnaruto
- Championships: 1 (Makuuchi); 1 (Jūryō); 1 (Makushita)
- Special Prizes: Outstanding Performance (3); Fighting Spirit (4); Technique (3)
- Gold Stars: 6 Akebono (2); Takanohana II (2); Wakanohana III; Asashōryū
- Updated on June 2020

Dejima Takeharu (出島 武春, born March 21, 1974) is a former sumo wrestler from Kanazawa, Ishikawa, Japan. A former amateur champion, he made his professional debut in 1996, reaching the top makuuchi division the following year. In July 1999 he won the yūshō or tournament championship and earned promotion to the second highest rank of ōzeki. He lost the rank in 2001 and, for the most part, remained a maegashira until his retirement in 2009. He won ten special prizes and six gold stars over his long career. He wrestled for Musashigawa stable. He is now an elder of the Japan Sumo Association under the name Ōnaruto Oyakata.

== Early career ==
Dejima did sumo at elementary school, where he was a rival of fellow top division wrestler Tochinonada. He was an amateur champion at Chuo University. Dejima joined professional sumo in March 1996 at the age of 22, recruited by Musashigawa stable, home to then ōzeki Musashimaru. Due to his amateur success he was given makushita tsukedashi status and was allowed to make his debut in the third makushita division. He did not adopt a traditional shikona, and he only ever used his real name as an active wrestler. In January 1997 he captured the tournament championship in the second jūryō division and was promoted to the top makuuchi division. His rise was so rapid that his hair had not yet grown long enough to be fashioned into the traditional oichonmage topknot.

Dejima scored an impressive 11 wins in his top division debut, and was awarded two special prizes, for technique and fighting spirit. After another 11–4 score in September, in which he won two more prizes and earned his first two kinboshi or gold stars for defeating yokozuna, he made his san'yaku debut at sekiwake in November 1997. However, after winning five of his first six matches, he injured himself on the seventh day and missed the next two tournaments. He made a full recovery and after reappearing in May 1998 he quickly returned to the san'yaku ranks at komusubi in September 1998, a rank he held for four straight tournaments.

== Ōzeki ==
Dejima returned to sekiwake in May 1999 and produced a strong 11–4 record, and in the following basho in July 1999 he won his first top division yūshō or tournament championship, defeating yokozuna Akebono and Takanohana and both ōzeki to score 13–2 and then beating Akebono once again in a playoff. Dejima chose to henka the yokozuna in this bout, for which he received some criticism. Nevertheless, in addition to his yūshō he was awarded all three special prizes on offer, for technique, outstanding performance and fighting spirit. He was only the second wrestler after Takahanada to achieve this feat. After the tournament his promotion to ōzeki was confirmed. He was the fourth former amateur champion, after Yutakayama, Wajima and Asashio, to reach sumo's second highest rank. His stablemates Musōyama and Miyabiyama subsequently made ōzeki also, in March and May 2000 respectively. With Musashimaru at yokozuna, Dejima had three of his colleagues in the top two ranks, an advantage as sumo wrestlers never fight members of their own stables except in playoffs.

Dejima held onto his ōzeki rank for two years, with his best result being an 11–4 score in March 2000, but in July 2001 he was forced to pull out of the tournament with only three wins. As he had also made a losing score in May 2001, he was demoted from ōzeki. Returning in September, he needed ten wins to return to ōzeki but still in poor condition he could only manage a 5–10 record.

== Later career ==
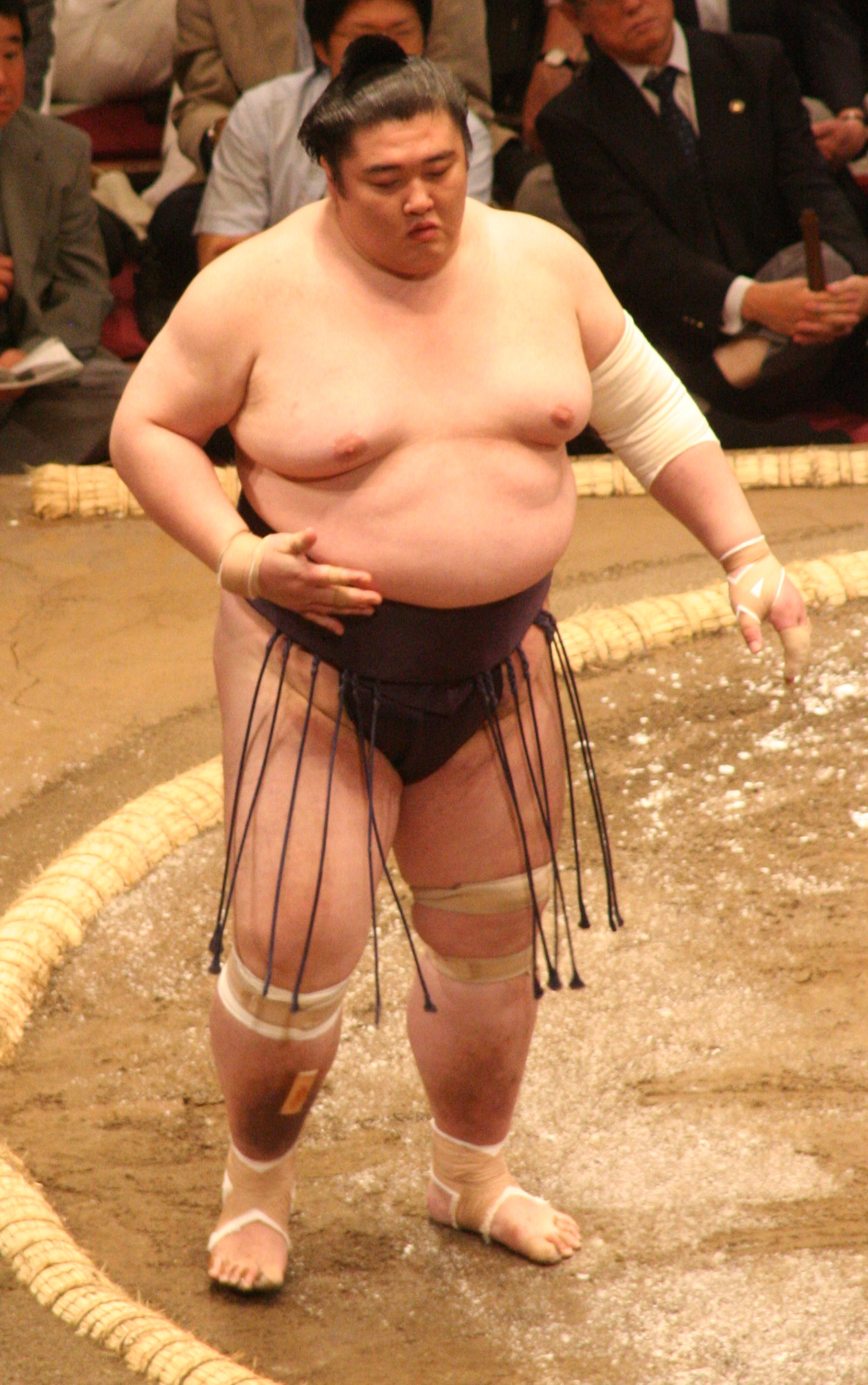
Dejima in May 2009

Persistent injuries, particularly to his knees and ankles, prevented Dejima from making any sustained attempt to regain ōzeki status. Aside from an 11–4 runner-up performance in January 2003 which briefly returned him to san'yaku, he largely remained in the maegashira ranks. He competed for 48 tournaments after dropping from the ōzeki rank – longer than any other former ōzeki in history until Miyabiyama overtook him. Near the end of his career he was still capable of producing strong results, as he proved in January 2007 by defeating Yokozuna Asashōryū, the only wrestler to do so in that tournament.

In May 2007 he produced a strong 12–3 record, his second runner-up performance in makuuchi and his highest score in a tournament since his title win, and was awarded his fourth fighting spirit prize. In November 2007 he earned ten wins from the maegashira 2 rank, and won promotion to komusubi for the January 2008 tournament. His return to the san'yaku ranks after 27 tournaments away was the third slowest in the modern era. He was however able to win only three bouts there. In November 2008 he won his first six matches, but then lost nine in a row. In May 2009, ranked at maegashira 12, he seemed in danger of demotion from makuuchi after recording only three wins in the first nine days, but he made a partial recovery to score 7–8.

== Retirement from sumo ==
In the July 2009 tournament, which came exactly ten years after his championship win, Dejima announced his retirement from active competition after suffering nine losses in the first eleven days, rather than face demotion to the second jūryō division.

Dejima has stayed in the sumo world as a coach at Musashigawa stable (now Fujishima stable) under the elder name Ōnaruto Oyakata. His official retirement ceremony or danpatsu-shiki was held at the Ryōgoku Kokugikan on 29 May 2010.

== Fighting style ==
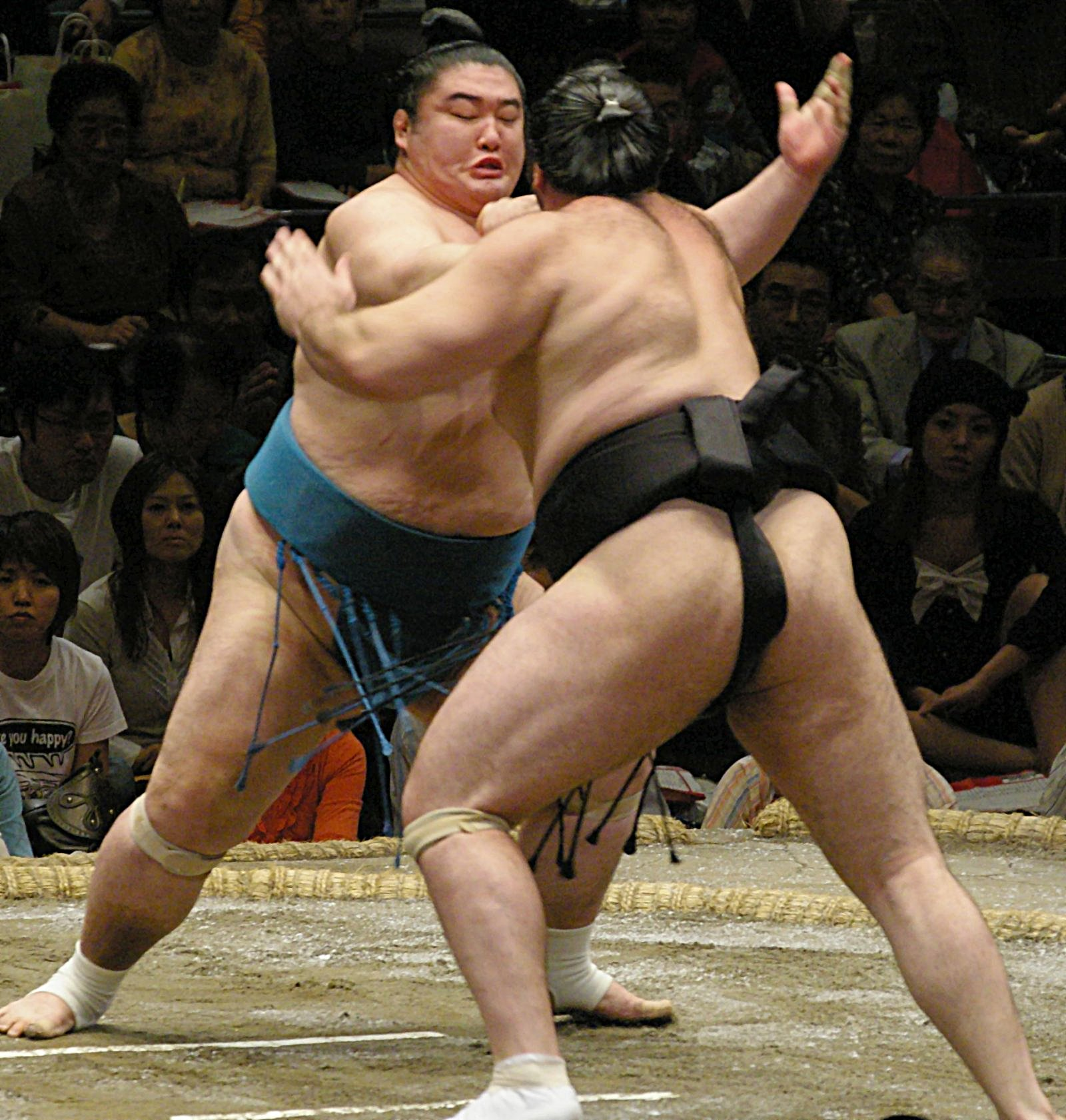
Dejima demonstrating his thrusting techniques against Kokkai

Dejima was an oshi-sumo specialist, favouring pushing and thrusting techniques (tsuki-oshi) over fighting on the mawashi or belt. His most common winning technique was oshi-dashi, or push-out, followed closely by yori-kiri or force out. These two techniques accounted for around 70 percent of his wins. He rarely employed throwing moves, his most common being the beltless sukuinage or scoop throw which he used for only 3 percent of his victories.

He was famed for his explosive start at the tachi-ai and so was often prone to being sidestepped at the initial charge. The technique which he has been defeated most often, aside from yori-kiri, is hataki-komi, a slap down move that is often the result of a sidestep. He was also vulnerable to the pull down, hiki-otoshi.

He suffered from knee and ankle problems in his latter years and had lost much of his speed and mobility. He remarked upon this at his retirement press conference, saying, "I have been battling with injuries and old wounds for some years now."

== Career record ==
Dejima Takeharu
Year	January Hatsu basho, Tokyo	March Haru basho, Osaka	May Natsu basho, Tokyo	July Nagoya basho, Nagoya	September Aki basho, Tokyo	November Kyūshū basho, Fukuoka
1996	x	Makushita tsukedashi #60; 5–2	West Makushita #43; 7–0; Champion	West Makushita #2; 5–2	West Jūryō #12; 11–4	East Jūryō #4; 9–6
1997	East Jūryō #2; 12–3; Champion	East Maegashira #13; 11–4; TF	West Maegashira #3; 7–8	East Maegashira #4; 8–7	East Maegashira #1; 11–4; TO★★	West Sekiwake #1; 3–5–7
1998	East Maegashira #2; Sat out due to injury 0–0–15	East Maegashira #2; Sat out due to injury 0–0–15	West Maegashira #11; 10–5; F	West Maegashira #4; 10–5; O★★	West Komusubi #1; 8–7	West Komusubi #1; 9–6
1999	East Komusubi #1; 8–7	West Komusubi #1; 9–6	East Sekiwake #2; 11–4	West Sekiwake #1; 13–2–P; TOF	East Ōzeki #2; 10–5	West Ōzeki #1; 10–5
2000	East Ōzeki #1; 9–6	East Ōzeki #1; 11–4	East Ōzeki #1; 8–7	East Ōzeki #2; 10–5	West Ōzeki #1; 10–5	East Ōzeki #2; 9–6
2001	East Ōzeki #2; 7–8	West Ōzeki #2; 8–7	East Ōzeki #2; 5–10	West Ōzeki #2; 3–3–9	West Sekiwake #1; 5–10	West Maegashira #3; 7–8
2002	West Maegashira #4; 6–9	East Maegashira #7; 6–9	East Maegashira #9; 9–6	East Maegashira #3; 2–3–10	East Maegashira #10; Sat out due to injury 0–0–15	East Maegashira #10; 10–5
2003	West Maegashira #3; 11–4 ★	East Komusubi #1; 8–7	West Sekiwake #1; 7–8	East Komusubi #1; Sat out due to injury 0–0–15	East Maegashira #10; 6–9	West Maegashira #14; 11–4
2004	East Maegashira #6; 10–5	East Maegashira #2; 7–8	West Maegashira #3; 7–8	West Maegashira #4; 7–8	West Maegashira #5; 10–5	East Maegashira #1; 0–3–12
2005	East Maegashira #10; 9–6	East Maegashira #5; 7–8	East Maegashira #6; 9–6	East Maegashira #2; 7–8	East Maegashira #3; 7–8	West Maegashira #3; 5–10
2006	West Maegashira #6; 8–7	West Maegashira #4; 6–9	West Maegashira #7; 8–7	West Maegashira #6; 8–7	East Maegashira #3; 7–8	West Maegashira #3; 10–5
2007	West Maegashira #1; 4–11 ★	East Maegashira #8; 7–8	East Maegashira #10; 12–3; F	East Maegashira #2; 5–10	East Maegashira #4; 8–7	West Maegashira #2; 10–5
2008	West Komusubi #1; 3–12	West Maegashira #6; 6–9	East Maegashira #10; 8–7	West Maegashira #8; 6–9	West Maegashira #12; 9–6	West Maegashira #5; 6–9
2009	West Maegashira #7; 7–8	East Maegashira #9; 6–9	West Maegashira #12; 7–8	West Maegashira #13; Retired; 2–10	x	x
Record given as wins–losses–absences Top division champion Top division runner-up Retired Lower divisions Non-participation Sanshō key: F=Fighting spirit; O=Outstanding performance; T=Technique Also shown: ★=Kinboshi; P=Playoff(s); Divisions: Makuuchi — Jūryō — Makushita — Sandanme — Jonidan — Jonokuchi Makuuchi ranks: Yokozuna — Ōzeki — Sekiwake — Komusubi — Maegashira

== See also ==
- Glossary of sumo terms
- List of sumo tournament top division champions
- List of sumo tournament top division runners-up
- List of sumo tournament second division champions
- List of past sumo wrestlers
- List of sumo elders
- List of ōzeki
