= Miyabiyama Tetsushi =

Sumo wrestler

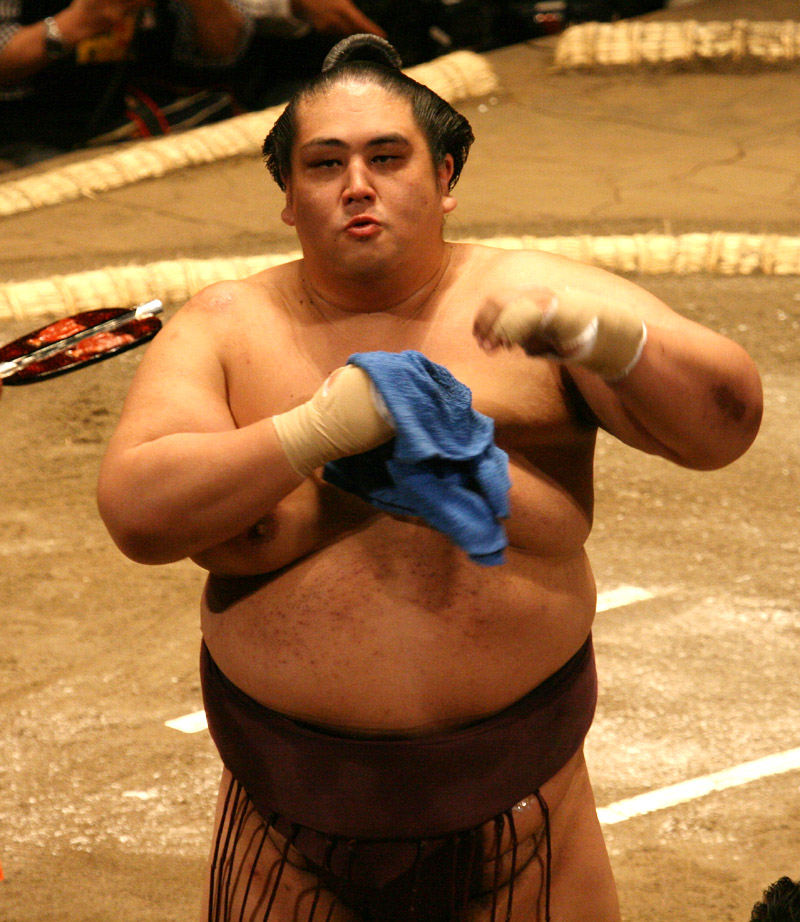
- Tetsushi in 2008

Personal information
- Native name: 雅山哲士
- Born: Masato Takeuchi; July 28, 1977 (age 49) Mito, Ibaraki, Japan
- Height: 1.87 m (6 ft 1 1/2 in)
- Weight: 182 kg (401 lb; 28.7 st)
- Website: http://www.musashigawa.jp/blog/miyabiyama/

Sport
- Sport: Sumo
- University team: Meiji University
- Retired: March 2013
- Heya: Fujishima
- Record: 654–582–68
- Debut: July 1998
- Highest rank: Ōzeki (July 2000)
- Elder name: Futagoyama
- Championships: 2 (Jūryō); 2 (Makushita)
- Special Prizes: Outstanding Performance (2); Fighting Spirit (5); Technique (1)
- Gold Stars: 2 (Asashōryū)
- Updated on March 2013

Miyabiyama Tetsushi (born July 28, 1977 as Masato Takeuchi) is a former sumo wrestler from Mito, Ibaraki, Japan. A former amateur champion, he turned professional in 1998. With the exception of two tournaments, he was ranked in the top division of professional sumo from 1999 until the end of his career in 2013, holding the second highest rank of ōzeki from 2000 to 2001. He won eight special prizes and was runner-up in four top division tournaments. He wrestled for Fujishima stable (formerly Musashigawa stable), where he worked as a coach until opening his own Futagoyama stable.

== Early career ==
Miyabiyama competed in amateur sumo tournaments while at Meiji University, but left before graduation to join the professional ranks. He was accepted by Musashigawa stable in July 1998 and given makushita tsukedashi status, meaning he could begin at the bottom of the third highest makushita division. He quickly worked his way through the ranks, logging in four consecutive championships, two in makushita and two in jūryō to reach the top makuuchi division in March 1999 just eight months after entering professional sumo. His rise to the middle ranks of makuuchi was so quick that he did not yet have a topknot, a true rarity and one that did not go unnoticed by announcers. He won a fighting spirit prize in his first top division tournament, and was promoted to komusubi in January 2000. In that tournament he delivered an impressive 12–3 record, finishing as runner up to stablemate Musōyama. He followed that up with two 11–4 marks at sekiwake rank in March and May 2000. After that tournament he was promoted to sumo's second highest rank of ōzeki. He had made the rank only 12 tournaments after his professional debut, tying for the record with Yutakayama (another amateur champion) and Haguroyama.

== Ōzeki ==
Miyabiyama's promotion was controversial. The Sumo Association's decision was not unanimous, with three of the ten directors present at the meeting voting against the promotion. Sakaigawa-oyakata (former yokozuna Sadanoyama), in particular, was reported to have felt it was too soon as Miyabiyama had only been in makuuchi for just over a year, and had not yet won a top division title. In the end the doubters were proved correct as Miyabiyama lasted just eight tournaments in the rank, never scoring more than 9 wins, before being demoted in the wake of two consecutive losing records. He was one of the shortest-lived ōzeki on record (not counting wrestlers who have quickly been promoted to yokozuna).

== Later career ==
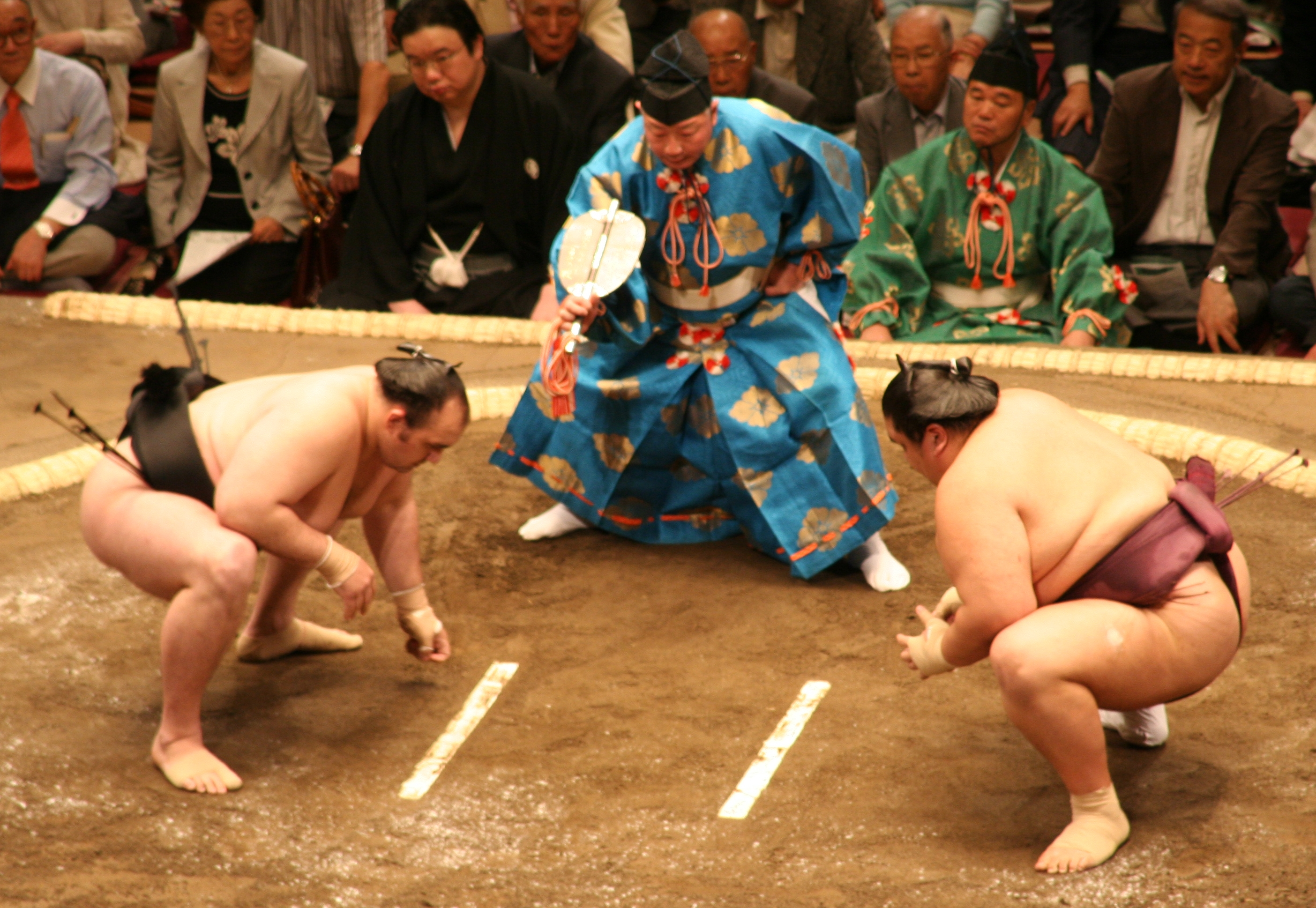
Miyabiyama (right) faces Rohō in May 2007.

Miyabiyama sat out the two tournaments following his demotion with an injury, and so had to start all over again from the maegashira ranks. In January 2003 he looked to have earned his first ever kinboshi or gold star and to have defeated yokozuna Takanohana for the first time in eleven attempts with a rare counter-attacking nichonage throw but although the referee declared him the winner the judges ordered a rematch, which he lost. (The Sumo Association was inundated with calls of protest from the public as a result.) He produced the occasional strong tournament, finishing as runner-up in July 2004, and he held a san'yaku rank several times, but he was unable to go further and continued to move up and down the banzuke.

It was not until mid-2006 that Miyabiyama was able to make his first sustained challenge for promotion to ōzeki since his demotion five years previously. In May at sekiwake rank he produced a superb 14–1 record, only losing the championship on the last day in a playoff to then-ōzeki Hakuhō. There was speculation that another strong performance in July 2006 would see him return to ōzeki, but he got off to a poor start, winning only three bouts in the first seven days, and though he recovered somewhat to post a 10–5 score, it was not considered good enough. He was only the second wrestler after Kotogahama in 1957 to post more than 33 wins in three tournaments in san'yaku and not get promoted to ōzeki. He could score only 9–6 and 8–7 in the next two basho and in January 2007 his run of five tournaments at sekiwake came to an end when he could only manage a 5–10 record.

In March 2007 Miyabiyama finally earned his first gold star by defeating yokozuna Asashōryū on the second day. He had defeated yokozuna on four previous occasions – Akebono in January 2000, Akebono and Wakanohana in March 2000 and Asashoryu himself in September 2004, but each time had been ranked in sanyaku and was not eligible for a kinboshi. The victory was all the more surprising as prior to this bout Miyabiyama had lost thirteen in a row to Asashōryū. However, on the 7th day he picked up a hamstring injury and had to withdraw from the tournament. He returned with a comfortable 9–6 mark in May, and remained in the upper maegashira ranks, defeating Asashōryū again in September 2008. In May 2009 he slipped to maegashira 11, his lowest ever top division ranking, but he responded with two consecutive winning records, the first time he had achieved this since 2006. In November 2009 he was runner-up alongside Tochinoshin on 12–3 and shared the Fighting Spirit award.

He was suspended along with over a dozen other wrestlers from the July 2010 tournament after admitting involvement in illegal betting on baseball. As a result, he became the first former ōzeki since Daiju in 1977 to be demoted to the jūryō division. This broke a run of 69 consecutive tournaments ranked in makuuchi. However, he had no problem in securing a return to the top division (the first ex-ōzeki ever to do so), scoring 12–3 at the rank of jūryō 2. In January 2012 he was ranked at komusubi, the first time in 29 tournaments that he had made the san'yaku ranks. However, he won only 33 out of a possible 90 bouts in that year (15 of those with the hatakikomi technique), and by January 2013 had fallen to the bottom makuuchi rank of maegashira 16. He won only three bouts in that tournament and was demoted to jūryō in March 2013, where he again only managed three wins and quickly announced his retirement on the last day of the tournament.

== Retirement from sumo ==
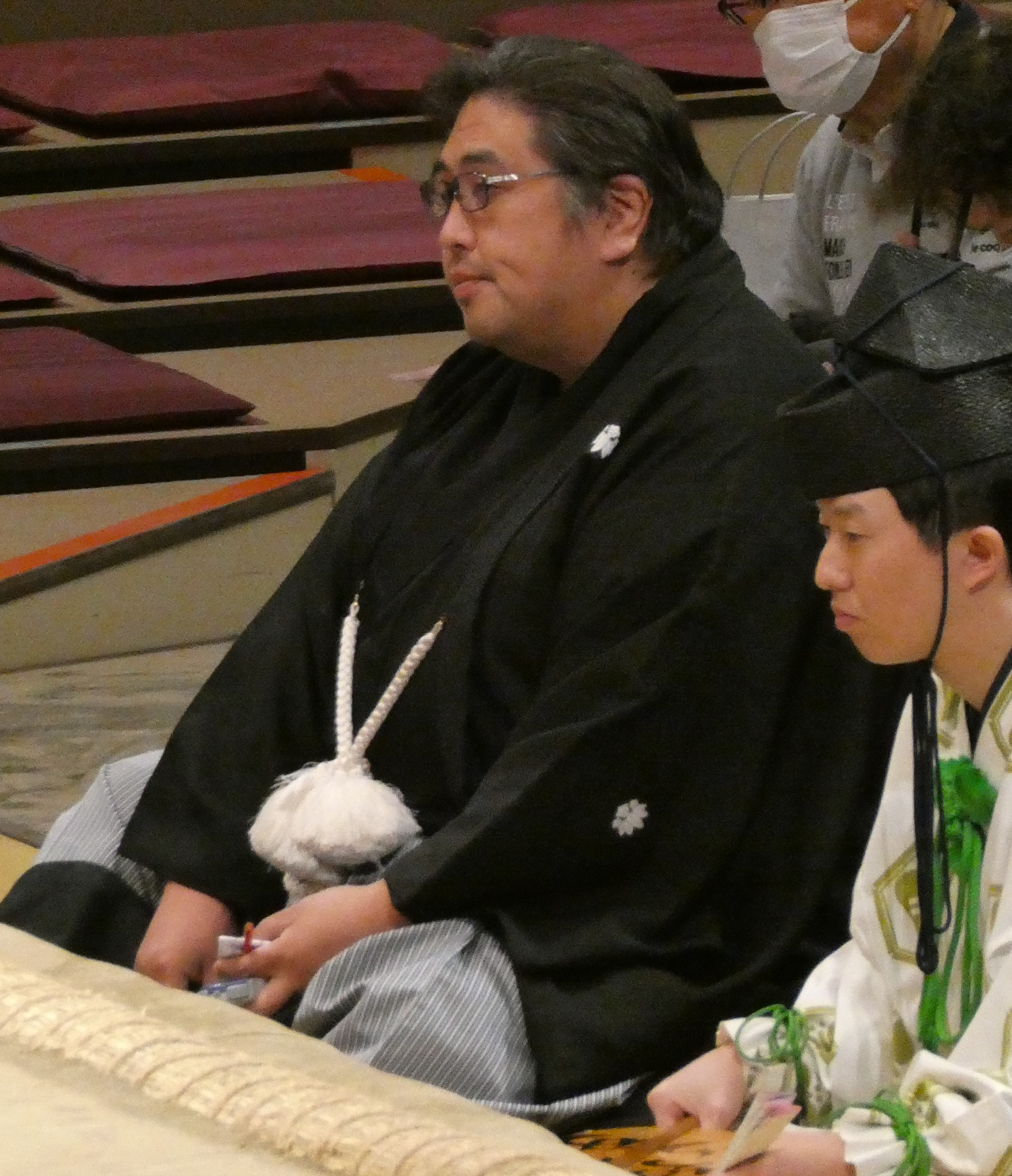
On duty as a judge in 2022

Miyabiyama fought in the top division for 82 tournaments in total, which is second best among makushita tsukedashi entrants and the eleventh best overall in sumo history. The 68 tournaments he fought after dropping from the ōzeki rank is also a record. Upon retirement he recalled his most memorable bout as being the first day of his comeback tournament in March 2002, having fallen from ōzeki and missed the previous two tournaments through injury.

Miyabiyama stayed in sumo as a coach at his stable under the elder name of Futagoyama Oyakata. His danpatsu-shiki, or official retirement ceremony, was held at the Ryōgoku Kokugikan on February 1, 2014 with around 8,000 in attendance and 270 guests taking part in the hair-cutting before his topknot was removed by his former stablemate Musōyama, now Fujishima Oyakata. After the ceremony he said he wanted to help develop strong Japanese wrestlers. In addition to coaching duties Futagoyama is also a quasi-independent councilor (Hyojjin) in the Sumo Association's hierarchy. In 2015 he launched his own yakiniku restaurant, Miyabiyama, in Edogawa, Tokyo.

In March 2018 he was given permission to branch out from Fujishima stable, and he opened up his own Futagoyama stable in Tokorozawa, Saitama on April 1.

In November 2025 it was reported that Miyabiyama had shaved his head for the first time in over 30 years in support of one of his stable's wrestlers, 23-year-old jūryō competitor Mita, who had suffered an ACL injury on the second day of the November Grand Sumo Tournament. Miyabiyama said that he had last shaved his head in high school because of his will to win at the All Japan High School Sports Tournament. He said that he thought Mita, who won the jūryō championship in his sixth professional tournament earlier in the year, would consider retiring after his injury. He decided to shave his head because he wanted to encourage Mita "not with words, but with action, to show him that we're fighting together."

== Fighting style ==
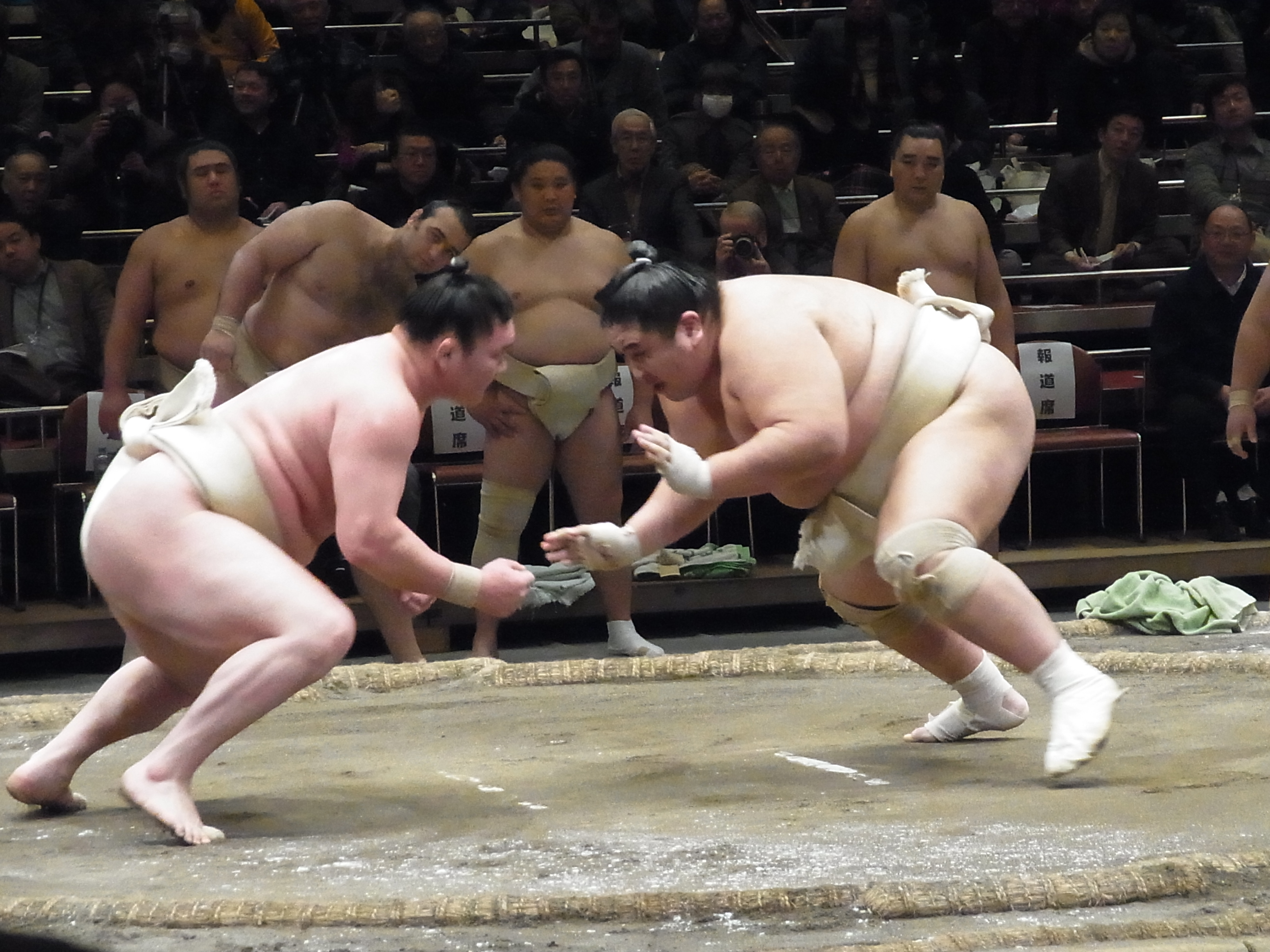
Miyabiyama in training in 2011.

Miyabiyama specialised in pushing and thrusting techniques, with about a third of his wins being a simple push-out, or oshi-dashi. In later years he relied more heavily on pull downs or slap downs, hiki otoshi and hatakikomi. Like most oshi specialists, he was at a disadvantage if his opponents managed to grab hold of his mawashi or belt. At 182 kg (401 lb), he was the heaviest man in the top division from the retirement of his stablemate Musashimaru in November 2003, until the arrival of the (now retired) 250 kg (550 lb) Yamamotoyama in 2009.

== Personal life ==
Miyabiyama was married in 2008 to a 24-year-old former office worker from Kurume, Fukuoka, and their wedding reception was held in June 2009 with 450 guests including his stablemaster Musashigawa Oyakata attending. In June 2013 his second eldest son died. In February 2014 his eldest son, then aged four, was Miyabiyama's final opponent in a bout at his retirement ceremony.

A few days after the conclusion of the March 2023 tournament, Miyabiyama was hospitalized for sepsis. He continued to give guidance to his wrestlers during their training by way of video conference until he was discharged.

== Career record ==
Miyabiyama Tetsushi
Year	January Hatsu basho, Tokyo	March Haru basho, Osaka	May Natsu basho, Tokyo	July Nagoya basho, Nagoya	September Aki basho, Tokyo	November Kyūshū basho, Fukuoka
1998	x	x	x	Makushita tsukedashi #60; 7–0; Champion	West Makushita #6; 7–0; Champion	West Jūryō #11; 12–3; Champion
1999	West Jūryō #1; 14–1; Champion	East Maegashira #7; 9–6; F	West Maegashira #2; 6–9	East Maegashira #4; 7–8	East Maegashira #5; 10–5	West Maegashira #1; 8–7
2000	West Komusubi #1; 12–3; O	West Sekiwake #1; 11–4; F	East Sekiwake #1; 11–4; F	West Ōzeki #1; 6–9	West Ōzeki #2; 8–7	West Ōzeki #2; 9–6
2001	West Ōzeki #2; 8–7	East Ōzeki #2; 7–8	West Ōzeki #2; 9–6	East Ōzeki #2; 7–8	West Ōzeki #2; 3–7–5	West Sekiwake #2; Sat out due to injury 0–0–15
2002	East Sekiwake #2; Sat out due to injury 0–0–15	East Maegashira #8; 9–6	East Maegashira #3; 10–5	East Komusubi #1; 6–9	East Maegashira #1; 7–8	East Maegashira #2; 8–7
2003	West Maegashira #1; 1–3–11	West Maegashira #9; 9–6	East Maegashira #5; 10–5	East Maegashira #1; 10–5	West Sekiwake #1; 4–11	East Maegashira #4; 6–9
2004	East Maegashira #7; 11–4	East Maegashira #1; 8–7	East Komusubi #1; 3–12	East Maegashira #7; 12–3	West Sekiwake #1; 9–6	West Sekiwake #1; 9–6
2005	West Sekiwake #1; 9–6	East Sekiwake #1; 5–10	East Maegashira #3; 8–7	West Komusubi #1; 7–8	East Maegashira #1; 6–9	East Maegashira #4; 10–5; F
2006	East Maegashira #1; 8–7	West Komusubi #1; 10–5	West Sekiwake #1; 14–1–P; OT	East Sekiwake #1; 10–5	East Sekiwake #1; 9–6	East Sekiwake #1; 8–7
2007	West Sekiwake #1; 5–10	East Maegashira #3; 4–4–7 ★	West Maegashira #9; 9–6	East Maegashira #5; 7–8	West Maegashira #5; 9–6	West Maegashira #1; 7–8
2008	West Maegashira #2; 7–8	West Maegashira #2; 7–8	East Maegashira #3; 6–9	East Maegashira #5; 9–6	West Maegashira #1; 4–11 ★	East Maegashira #7; 10–5
2009	East Maegashira #2; 6–9	East Maegashira #3; 4–11	East Maegashira #11; 9–6	East Maegashira #4; 8–7	West Maegashira #1; 4–11	West Maegashira #9; 12–3; F
2010	West Maegashira #2; 5–10	East Maegashira #7; 10–5	West Maegashira #1; 5–10	West Maegashira #5; Suspended; 0–0–15	East Jūryō #2; 12–3	West Maegashira #14; 9–6
2011	East Maegashira #10; 6–9	Tournament Cancelled; 0–0–0	East Maegashira #16; 8–7	West Maegashira #8; 8–7	East Maegashira #5; 7–8	East Maegashira #6; 11–4
2012	East Komusubi #1; 3–12	West Maegashira #9; 8–7	West Maegashira #5; 4–11	East Maegashira #9; 8–7	East Maegashira #7; 5–10	West Maegashira #11; 5–10
2013	East Maegashira #16; 3–12	East Jūryō #9; Retired; 3–12	x	x	x	x
Record given as wins–losses–absences Top division champion Top division runner-up Retired Lower divisions Non-participation Sanshō key: F=Fighting spirit; O=Outstanding performance; T=Technique Also shown: ★=Kinboshi; P=Playoff(s); Divisions: Makuuchi — Jūryō — Makushita — Sandanme — Jonidan — Jonokuchi Makuuchi ranks: Yokozuna — Ōzeki — Sekiwake — Komusubi — Maegashira

== See also ==
- Glossary of sumo terms
- List of sumo tournament top division runners-up
- List of sumo tournament second division champions
- List of past sumo wrestlers
- List of sumo elders
- List of ōzeki
