= Fujishima stable (2010) =

Organization of sumo wrestlers

Coordinates: 35.7265°N 139.7801°E

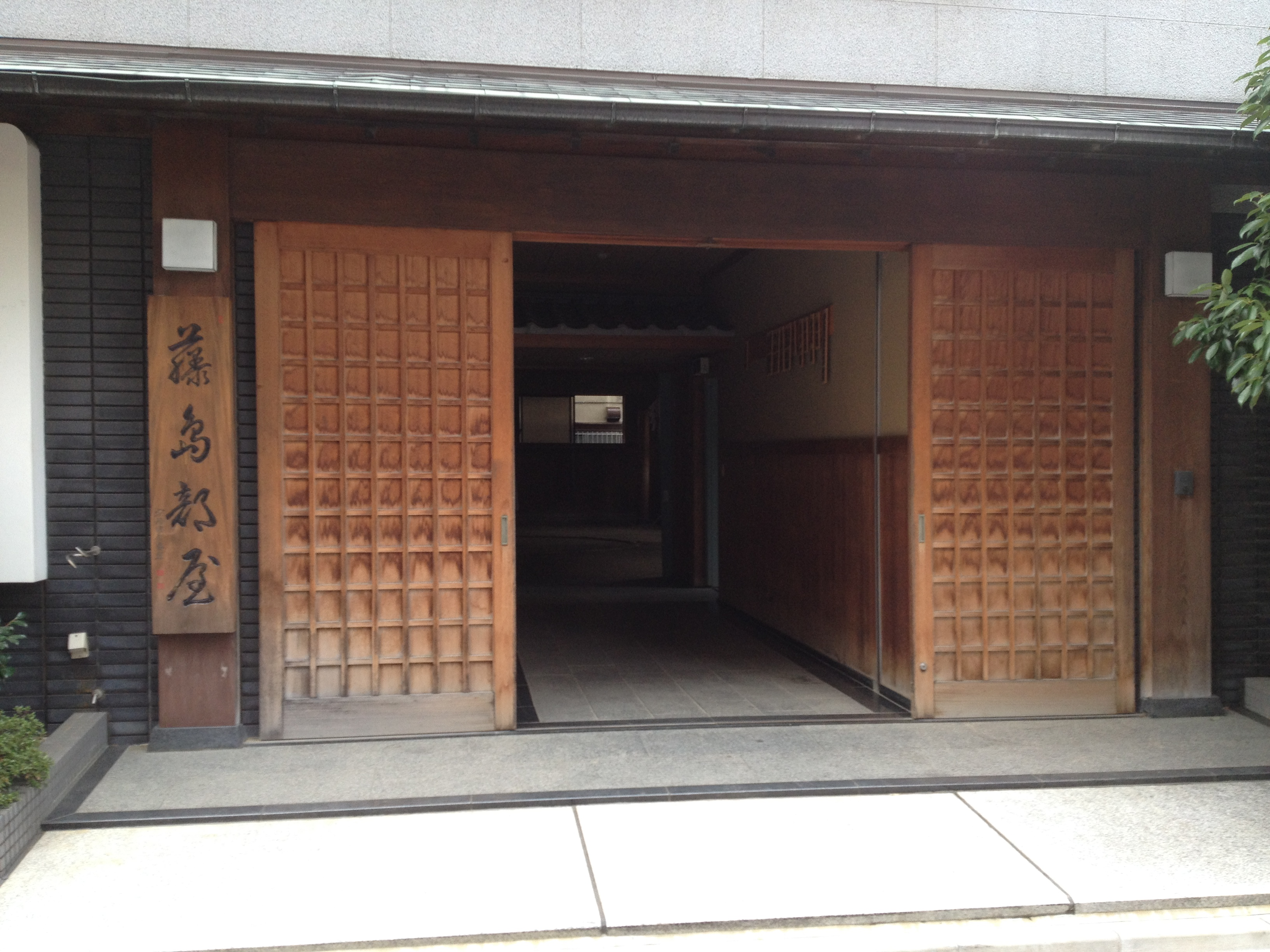

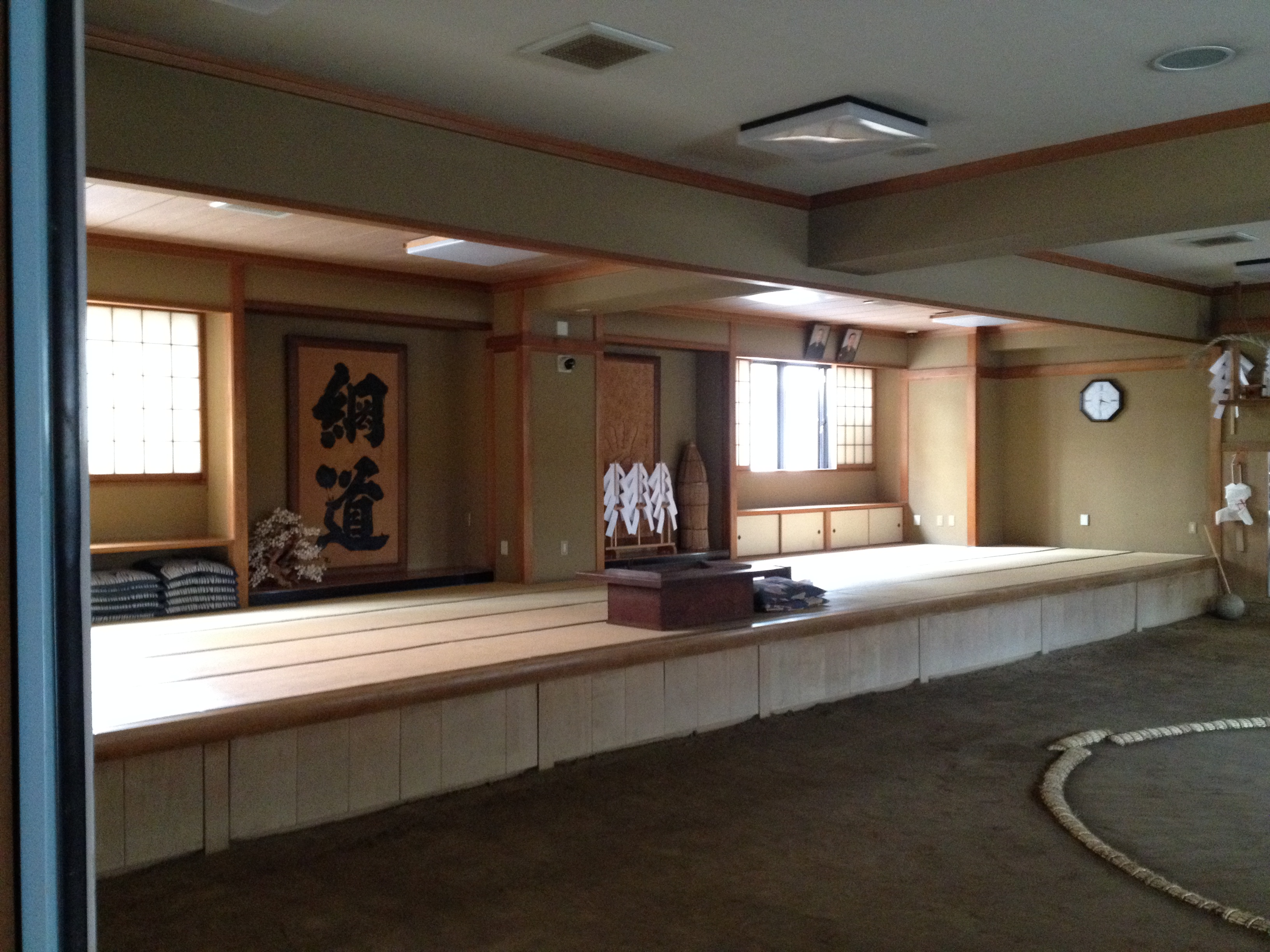

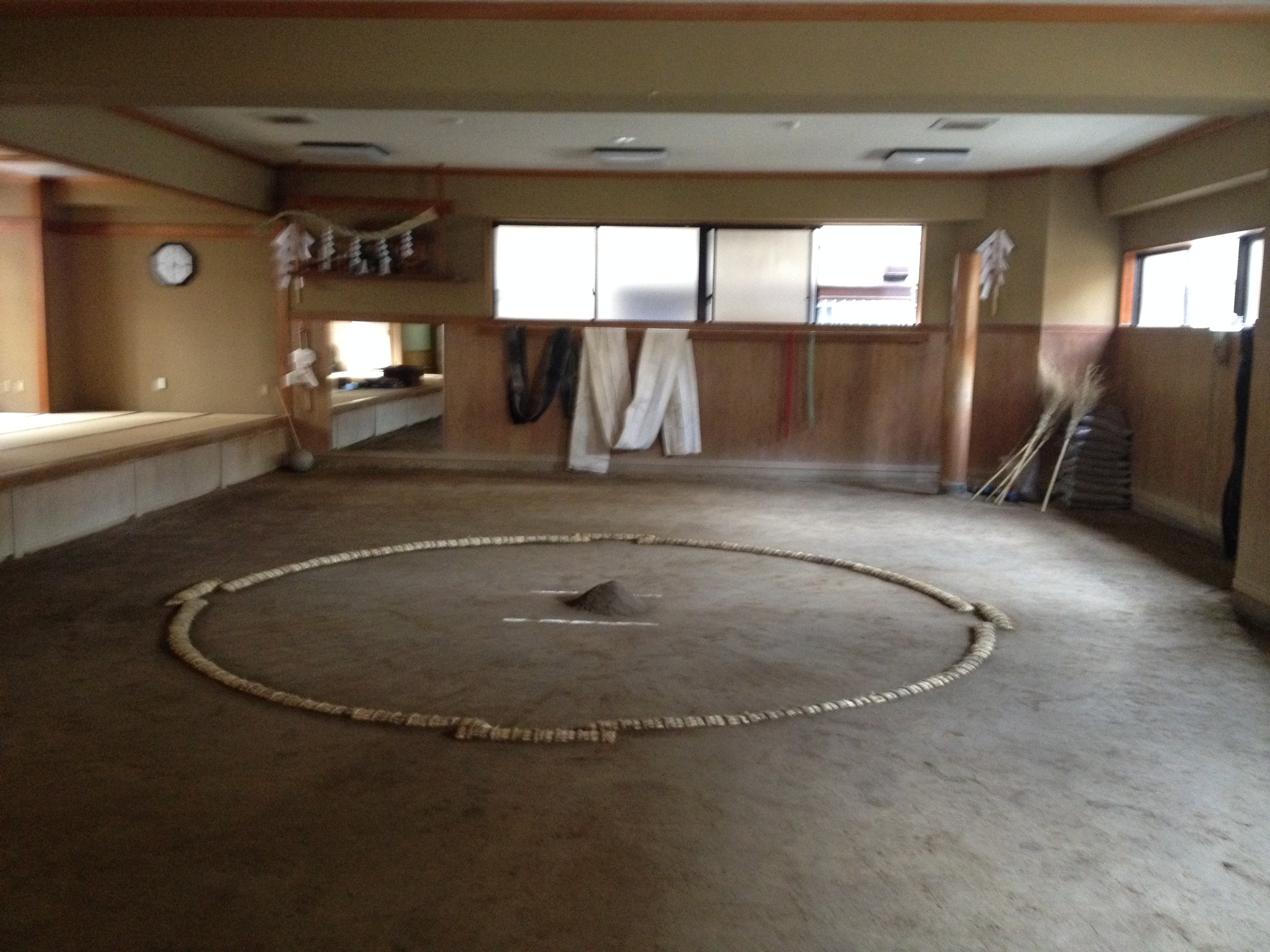

Fujishima stable (藤島部屋, Fujishima-beya), formerly known as Musashigawa stable, is a stable of sumo wrestlers, part of the Dewanoumi ichimon or group of stables. It was set up in August 1981 by former yokozuna Mienoumi, who branched off from Dewanoumi stable. Since its founding Dewanoumi had a long tradition of not permitting its coaches to break away and form new stables, and Mienoumi was the first to amicably depart Dewanoumi stable since Tochigiyama set up Kasugano stable 62 years earlier. As of May 2026, the stable has 13 active wrestlers.

By the early 2000s it had become the strongest stable in sumo, with a yokozuna, three ōzeki and several other top division wrestlers. Until January 2025, the stable was the last to have lined up seven of its wrestlers (Musashimaru, Musōyama, Miyabiyama, Buyūzan, Dejima, Kakizoe and Wakanoyama) in the makuuchi division during the September 2003 tournament, a feat matched only by Isegahama stable, 22 years later. Wrestlers from the stable won six consecutive tournaments from March 1999 to January 2000. In September 2008 Mienoumi also became head of the Sumo Association.

In September 2010 the former Mienoumi stood down as head coach and passed the stable to former ōzeki Musōyama, who changed its name to Fujishima. Former yokozuna Musashimaru branched off from the stable in April 2013 after taking on the elder name of his former head coach, creating the next generation Musashigawa stable. It had no sekitori from the demotion of Shōtenrō to the makushita division in March 2016 until the promotion of Bushozan five years later. Bushozan is the second wrestler to reach jūryō since the current head coach took over, following Tsurugidake in 2010.

== Ring name conventions ==
Some wrestlers at this stable take ring names or shikona that include the character 武 (read: bu or mu), meaning war or weapon, which is taken from the first character of the former name of the stable, Musashigawa, and is also the first character in the name of the stable's current owner, Musōyama. Examples include Bushozan, Mugendai and Musashiumi.

== Owners ==
- 2010–present: 18th Fujishima Takehito (riji, ōzeki Musōyama)
- 1981–2010: 14th Musashigawa Akihide (the 57th yokozuna Mienoumi)

== Coaches ==
- Ōnaruto Takeharu (iin, ōzeki Dejima)
- Yamawake Takeyoshi (iin, maegashira Buyūzan)
- Matsuchiyama Takashi (iin, maegashira Bushūyama)
- Izutsu Shō (toshiyori, maegashira Shōtenrō)

== Assistant ==
- Aranonami (sewanin, makushita, real name Jirō Takahashi)

== Notable active wrestlers ==
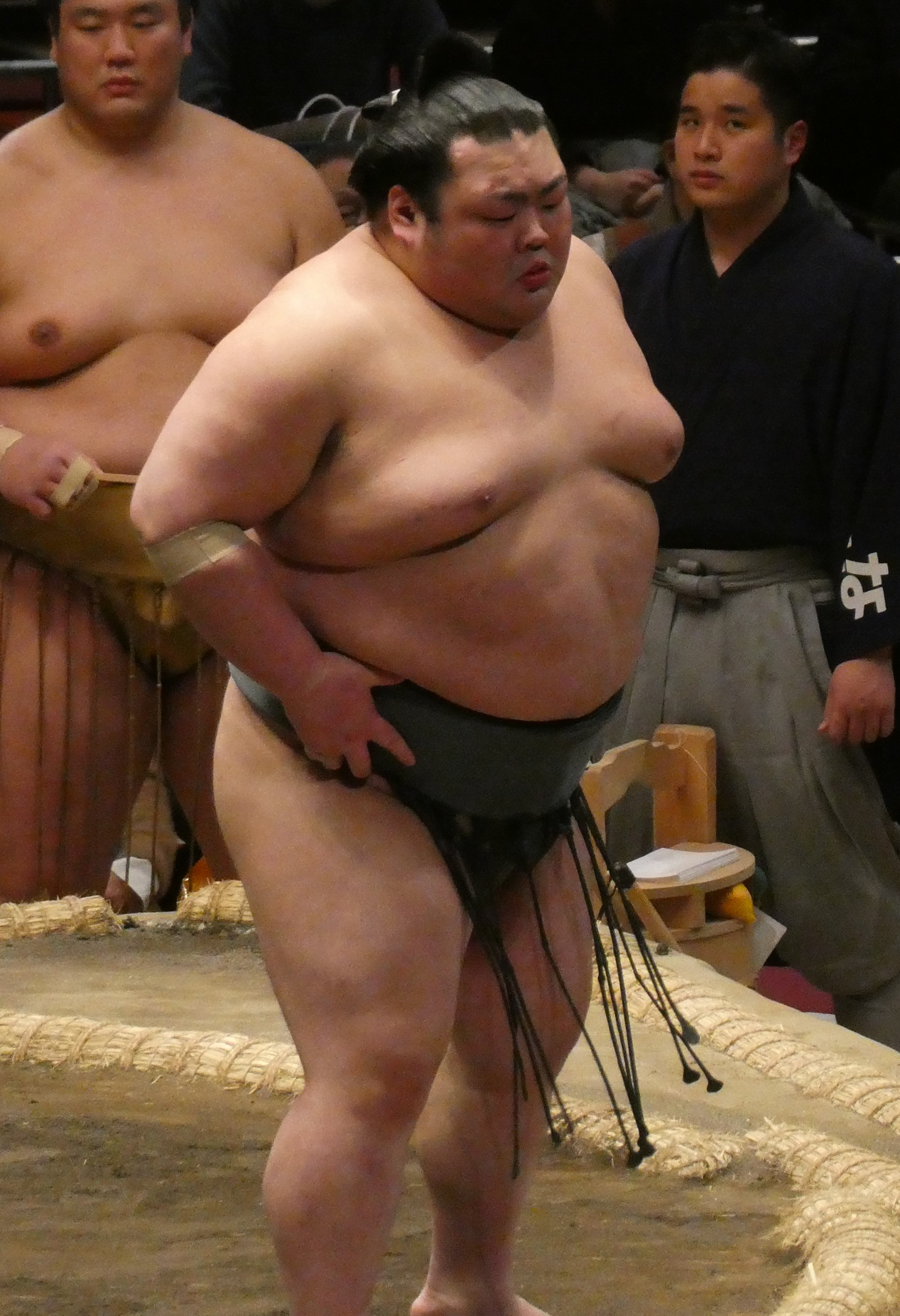
Bushozan is the stable's highest ranking wrestler as of 2022

- Bushōzan (best rank maegashira)
- Fujiseiun (best rank maegashira)
- Fujiryōga (best rank maegashira)
- Fujitensei) (best rank jūryō)

== Notable former wrestlers ==
- Musashimaru (the 67th yokozuna)
- Dejima (former ōzeki)
- Musōyama (former ōzeki)
- Miyabiyama (former ōzeki)
- Wakanoyama (former komusubi)
- Shōtenrō (former maegashira)

== Hairdresser ==
- Tokotakeshi (first class tokoyama)

== Location and access ==
Tokyo, Arakawa Ward, Higashi-Nippori 4-27-1
Short walk from Uguisudani Station on Yamanote Line and Keihin-Tohoku Line

== See also ==
- List of sumo stables
- List of active sumo wrestlers
- List of past sumo wrestlers
- Glossary of sumo terms
