= Musōyama Masashi =

Japanese sumo wrestler

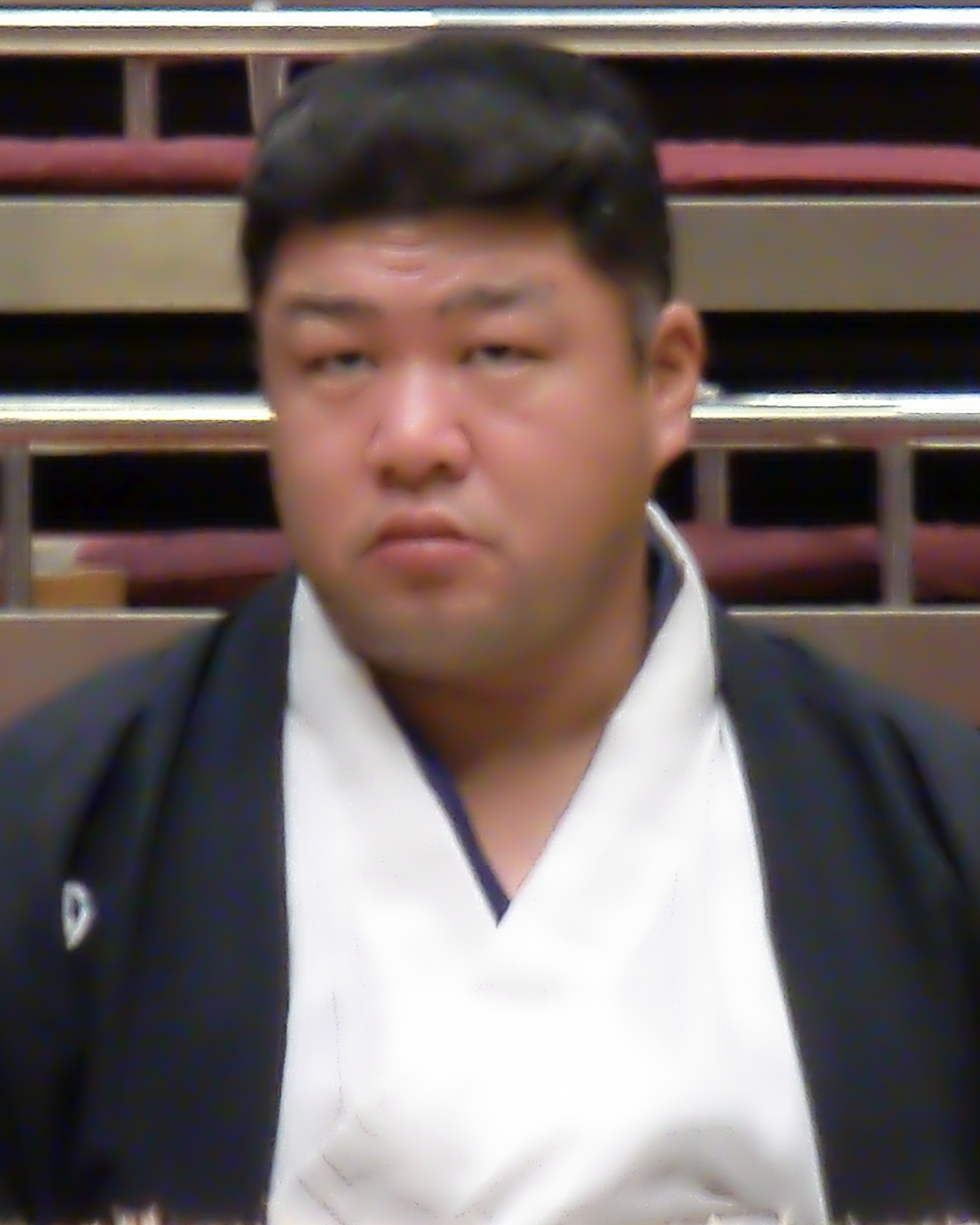

Personal information
- Native name: 武双山 正士
- Born: Takehito Oso; February 14, 1972 (age 54) Ibaraki, Japan
- Height: 1.84 m (6 ft 1/2 in)
- Weight: 175 kg (386 lb)

Sport
- Sport: Sumo
- University team: Senshu University
- Retired: November 2004
- Heya: Musashigawa
- Record: 554-377-122
- Debut: January 1993
- Highest rank: Ōzeki (May 2000)
- Elder name: Fujishima
- Championships: 1 (Makuuchi); 2 (Makushita)
- Special Prizes: Outstanding Performance (5); Fighting Spirit (4); Technique (4)
- Gold Stars: 2 Akebono; Takanohana II
- Updated on July 2007

Musōyama Masashi (born February 14, 1972, as Takehito Oso) is a former sumo wrestler from Mito, Ibaraki, Japan. A former amateur champion, he turned professional in January 1993, and he won promotion to the top makuuchi division in just four tournaments. He won thirteen special prizes and spent a total of 31 tournaments at komusubi and sekiwake before finally reaching the second highest rank of ōzeki in 2000, shortly after winning his only top division tournament championship or yūshō. He retired in 2004. He is now the head coach of Fujishima stable.

== Early career ==
Oso was interested in sumo from a young age, as his father was the director of the Ibaraki Prefecture sumo association. He won national amateur titles at high school and at Senshu University, where he was a rival of Tosanoumi. He made his professional debut in January 1993 in the third makushita division, as due to his amateur achievements he had been given makushita tsukedashi status. He breezed through makushita undefeated with two consecutive 7–0 scores to earn promotion to the second jūryō division, whereupon he changed his shikona from Oso to Musōyama, meaning "twin warrior mountain." He made his debut in the top makuuchi division in September 1993. It took him only seven tournaments from his professional debut to make the san'yaku ranks, debuting at sekiwake in March 1994. In September he won his first eleven matches, finishing as runner up to Takanohana with a fine 13–2 record. Over the next few years he was regularly ranked at either sekiwake or komusubi, but was unable to make the next step up. He suffered a number of injuries, including a dislocated shoulder and a persistent problem with his left big toe which affected his speed of movement.

== Ōzeki career ==
In January 2000 Musōyama won his first top division yūshō or tournament championship with a score of 13–2, finishing one win ahead of Takanohana whom he had defeated earlier in the tournament. He followed up with a 12–3 score in March, his second runner-up performance, which earned him promotion to ōzeki. He missed the whole of his debut ōzeki tournament through injury and could manage only a 4–11 record on his return, resulting in demotion back to sekiwake. However he scored ten wins in the September 2000 tournament, which immediately restored him to ōzeki status. His time at ōzeki was bedeviled by further injuries which meant he was often merely struggling to maintain his rank instead of challenging for tournament championships and further promotion. His best performance as an ōzeki was a 12–3 runner-up score in March 2001, but that was the only tournament in which he was able to win more than ten bouts. On the 6th day of the May 2001 tournament he had a match with Kotomitsuki that lasted a total of nine minutes and 17 seconds. After two breaks, the match was eventually called off and rescheduled for later in the day, the first time this had happened in the top division since 1978. Musōyama lost the rearranged match. The last tournament in which he managed a score in double figures was in July 2003. After pulling out of the September 2004 tournament with only two wins he lost his first three matches in November and announced his retirement, at the age of 32.

== After retirement ==
Musōyama remained in sumo as a coach at his stable and is now known as Fujishima-oyakata. In September 2010 he took over as the head coach and changed its name to Fujishima stable. As of 2024 the stable has two sekitori wrestlers, Bushōzan and Fujiseiun.

In January 2015 Musōyama was named deputy director of the Refereeing Department, and as a result was one of the chief judges to adjudicate sumo matches. He held this position until March 2022, but since then he has had to fill in as a chief judge on several occasions.

At the Sumo Association's board meeting in March 2026 Musōyama was named as the director of public relations, effectively becoming the association's top spokesman.

== Fighting style ==
He was mainly a oshi-sumo wrestler, preferring pushing and thrusting techniques. His most common winning kimarite was oshi-dashi, a simple push out. However, he was also capable of fighting on the mawashi, his favoured grip being hidari-yotsu (right hand outside, left hand inside).

== Career record ==
Musōyama Masashi
Year	January Hatsu basho, Tokyo	March Haru basho, Osaka	May Natsu basho, Tokyo	July Nagoya basho, Nagoya	September Aki basho, Tokyo	November Kyūshū basho, Fukuoka
1993	Makushita tsukedashi #60; 7–0; Champion	East Makushita #8; 7–0; Champion	West Jūryō #9; 9–6	West Jūryō #5; 11–4	West Maegashira #15; 9–6	West Maegashira #11; 9–6
1994	West Maegashira #3; 10–5; O★	West Sekiwake #1; 9–6	West Sekiwake #1; 9–6	West Sekiwake #1; 8–7	East Sekiwake #1; 13–2; FO	East Sekiwake #1; 7–8
1995	West Komusubi #1; 4–3–8	West Maegashira #4; Sat out due to injury 0–0–15	West Maegashira #4; 11–4; FO★	West Sekiwake #1; 10–5; T	West Sekiwake #1; 8–7	East Sekiwake #1; 7–8
1996	West Komusubi #1; 10–5	East Sekiwake #2; 12–3; T	East Sekiwake #1; 10–5	West Sekiwake #1; 7–8	East Komusubi #1; 7–8	West Komusubi #1; 8–7
1997	East Komusubi #1; 8–7	East Sekiwake #1; 7–8	East Komusubi #1; 6–9	East Maegashira #1; 9–6	East Komusubi #1; 0–3–12	East Maegashira #6; 11–4; F
1998	East Sekiwake #1; 10–5; F	West Sekiwake #1; 9–6	West Sekiwake #1; 5–10	East Maegashira #2; 9–6	East Komusubi #1; 8–7	East Komusubi #1; 9–6
1999	West Sekiwake #2; 10–5; O	East Sekiwake #1; 1–2–12	East Maegashira #6; Sat out due to injury 0–0–15	East Maegashira #6; 11–4	West Komusubi #1; 8–7	East Komusubi #1; 10–5
2000	East Sekiwake #2; 13–2; OT	East Sekiwake #1; 12–3; T	West Ōzeki #1; Sat out due to injury 0–0–15	West Ōzeki #2; 4–11	West Sekiwake #1; 10–5	West Ōzeki #3; 9–6
2001	West Ōzeki #3; 9–6	West Ōzeki #1; 12–3	West Ōzeki #1; 9–6	West Ōzeki #1; 10–5	East Ōzeki #2; 10–5	East Ōzeki #1; 9–6
2002	West Ōzeki #1; 10–5	East Ōzeki #2; 10–5	East Ōzeki #2; 9–5–1	West Ōzeki #2; Sat out due to injury 0–0–15	West Ōzeki #2; 8–7	West Ōzeki #2; 10–5
2003	West Ōzeki #1; 8–7	East Ōzeki #1; 1–6–8	East Ōzeki #2; 8–7	East Ōzeki #2; 10–5	East Ōzeki #2; 1–5–9	West Ōzeki #2; 9–6
2004	East Ōzeki #2; 5–4–6	West Ōzeki #2; 9–6	West Ōzeki #2; 6–9	East Ōzeki #2; 8–7	East Ōzeki #2; 2–7–6	East Ōzeki #2; Retired; 0–4
Record given as wins–losses–absences Top division champion Top division runner-up Retired Lower divisions Non-participation Sanshō key: F=Fighting spirit; O=Outstanding performance; T=Technique Also shown: ★=Kinboshi; P=Playoff(s); Divisions: Makuuchi — Jūryō — Makushita — Sandanme — Jonidan — Jonokuchi Makuuchi ranks: Yokozuna — Ōzeki — Sekiwake — Komusubi — Maegashira

== See also ==
- List of sumo tournament top division champions
- List of sumo tournament top division runners-up
- Glossary of sumo terms
- List of past sumo wrestlers
- List of sumo elders
- List of ōzeki
