= Hishofuji Hiroki =

Sumo wrestler (b. 1989)

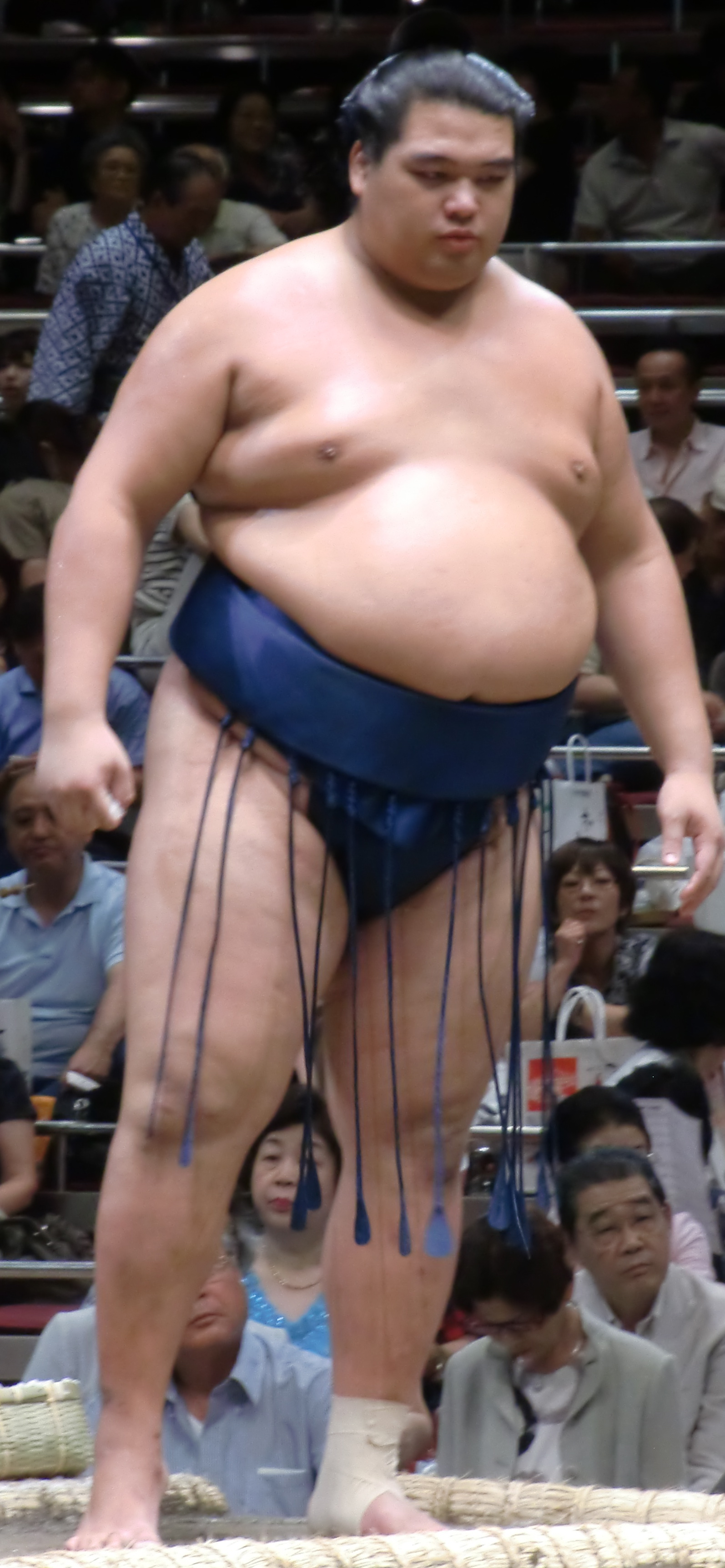
- Hishofuji during his only tournament sekitori, September 2011

Personal information
- Native name: 飛翔富士 廣樹
- Born: Hiroki Sumi; July 14, 1989 (age 37) Hyōgo-ku, Kobe, Japan
- Height: 1.92 m (6 ft 3 1/2 in)
- Weight: 201 kg (443 lb; 31 st 9 lb)

Sport
- Sport: Sumo
- Retired: January 2017
- Heya: Nakamura → Azumazeki
- Record: 234-197-47
- Debut: March 2005
- Highest rank: Juryo 13 (September 2011)
- Championships: 2; 1 (Sandanme); 1 (Jonokuchi)
- Updated on May 2023

Hishofuji Hiroki (born July 14, 1989, as Hiroki Sumi) is a former sumo wrestler from Hyōgo-ku, Kobe, Japan. The highest rank he reached was Juryo 13, which he held for just a single basho. He wrestled for Nakamura stable until it closed down in December 2012, then transferring and finishing his career at Azumazeki stable. He retired in January 2017. He now lives in Los Angeles and participates in sumo exhibitions and amateur tournaments under the name Hiroki, often alongside Ulambayaryn Byambajav and Yamamotoyama.

== Career ==
Hiroki was always a large boy and by the time he had graduated from Hyogo junior high school he was already 190 cm tall and weighed 120 kg. Hiroki was also a notable judoka at the prefectural level. This along with his exceeding size garnered him an invitation to join Nakamura stable. He made his debut in March 2005 and made steady progress up the banzuke. This continued until he reached Sandanme in March 2007 recording a mere three losing records on his way there. After a few losing records and bouncing between sandanme and Jonidan he returned to steady progress and was promoted to Makushita. This is where he would spend most of his career. He was helped along by the 2011 match fixing scandal which saw many wrestlers forced to retire, and in September 2011 was promoted to his career high rank of Juryo 13 and become a sekitori. He would win only four of his fifteen matches and was immediately demoted back down to makushita; he would never make it back to the salaried ranks again. In November 2012 with his stable master Fujizakura reaching the mandatory retirement age and closing down the stable he transferred to Azumazeki stable. In late 2013 Hiroki suffered a major right knee injury which would see him sit out for over a year and drop off the banzuke. He would return to the dohyo in January 2015 and start an impressive 22 win streak picking up two lower division yusho (Jonokuchi and Sandanme) in the process. After this though he would put up mediocre records having been troubled by a left ankle issue. After three consecutive losing records and losing his opening bout of the January 2017 basho he decided to retire.

== After retirement ==
=== Exhibitions and amateur tournaments ===
On 25 January 2017, it was announced by the Japan Sumo Association that Hishofuji was retiring from the sumo wrestling association. After his retirement from the Japan Sumo Association, he decided to leave Japan for the United States. Here he would start doing sumo exhibitions and amateur tournaments, often alongside Ulambayaryn Byambajav and Yamamotoyama. He also made his pro wrestling debut in WWE at the Greatest Royal Rumble in Jeddah, Saudi Arabia where he was the 7th entrant, but was quickly eliminated by Mark Henry. In July 2020 he appeared on Game On! with Bobby Lee.

=== On screen ===
In February 2023, he announced that he participated in the filming of the Netflix series revolving around the world of professional sumo, Sanctuary, in which he plays the role of a wrestler (Shizuuchi).

Hiroki Sumi made an appearance in John Wick: Chapter 4 playing the role of a guard in the Osaka Continental alongside fellow retired sumo wrestler Yoshinori Tashiro.

In 2024 he was also cast as main title character in The Wide West, a film starring Alexander Nevsky, about a sumo wrestler's arrival in the United States.

== Career record ==
Hishofuji Hiroki
Year	January Hatsu basho, Tokyo	March Haru basho, Osaka	May Natsu basho, Tokyo	July Nagoya basho, Nagoya	September Aki basho, Tokyo	November Kyūshū basho, Fukuoka
2005	x	(Maezumo)	West Jonokuchi #18; 4–3	East Jonidan #119; 4–3	East Jonidan #93; 4–3	East Jonidan #70; 3–4
2006	East Jonidan #91; 4–3	West Jonidan #63; 4–3	West Jonidan #38; 2–5	West Jonidan #71; 4–3	West Jonidan #45; 3–4	East Jonidan #63; 5–2
2007	East Jonidan #24; 5–2	West Sandanme #92; 3–4	East Jonidan #9; 6–1	East Sandanme #48; 0–7	East Sandanme #99; 3–4	East Jonidan #18; 5–2
2008	East Sandanme #85; 5–2	East Sandanme #52; 4–3	East Sandanme #37; 4–3	East Sandanme #25; 4–3	West Sandanme #10; 5–2	East Makushita #47; 3–4
2009	East Makushita #56; 3–4	East Sandanme #11; 5–2	East Makushita #48; 4–3	West Makushita #39; 5–2	West Makushita #29; 1–6	East Makushita #59; 4–3
2010	West Makushita #52; 5–2	West Makushita #39; 3–4	West Makushita #47; 4–3	East Makushita #40; 2–5	East Makushita #54; 5–2	East Makushita #35; 4–3
2011	West Makushita #29; 5–2	West Makushita #21; Tournament Cancelled; Match fixing investigation 0–0–0	West Makushita #21; 4–3	West Makushita #11; 6–1	East Jūryō #13; 4–11	East Makushita #7; 3–4
2012	West Makushita #10; 3–4	West Makushita #18; 5–2	East Makushita #12; 1–6	East Makushita #29; 2–5	East Makushita #47; 3–4	East Makushita #59; 0–1–6
2013	East Sandanme #35; 5–2	West Sandanme #7; 5–4	West Makushita #43; 4–3	West Makushita #36; 2–5	East Makushita #55; 5–2	East Makushita #35; Sat out due to injury 0–0–7
2014	West Sandanme #15; Sat out due to injury 0–0–7	East Sandanme #76; Sat out due to injury 0–0–7	West Jonidan #36; Sat out due to injury 0–0–7	West Jonidan #5; Sat out due to injury 0–0–7	(Banzukegai)	(Banzukegai)
2015	(Maezumo)	West Jonokuchi #16; 7–0; Champion	West Jonidan #10; 7–0–P	West Sandanme #20; 7–0; Champion	East Makushita #13; 3–4	East Makushita #20; 4–3
2016	West Makushita #15; 4–3	East Makushita #11; 3–4	West Makushita #17; 4–3	West Makushita #12; 3–4	West Makushita #20; 3–4	East Makushita #27; 3–4
2017	East Makushita #33; Retired; 0–1–6	x	x	x	x	x
Record given as wins–losses–absences Top division champion Top division runner-up Retired Lower divisions Non-participation Sanshō key: F=Fighting spirit; O=Outstanding performance; T=Technique Also shown: ★=Kinboshi; P=Playoff(s); Divisions: Makuuchi — Jūryō — Makushita — Sandanme — Jonidan — Jonokuchi Makuuchi ranks: Yokozuna — Ōzeki — Sekiwake — Komusubi — Maegashira

== See also ==
- Glossary of sumo terms
- List of past sumo wrestlers
