= Yoshimori =

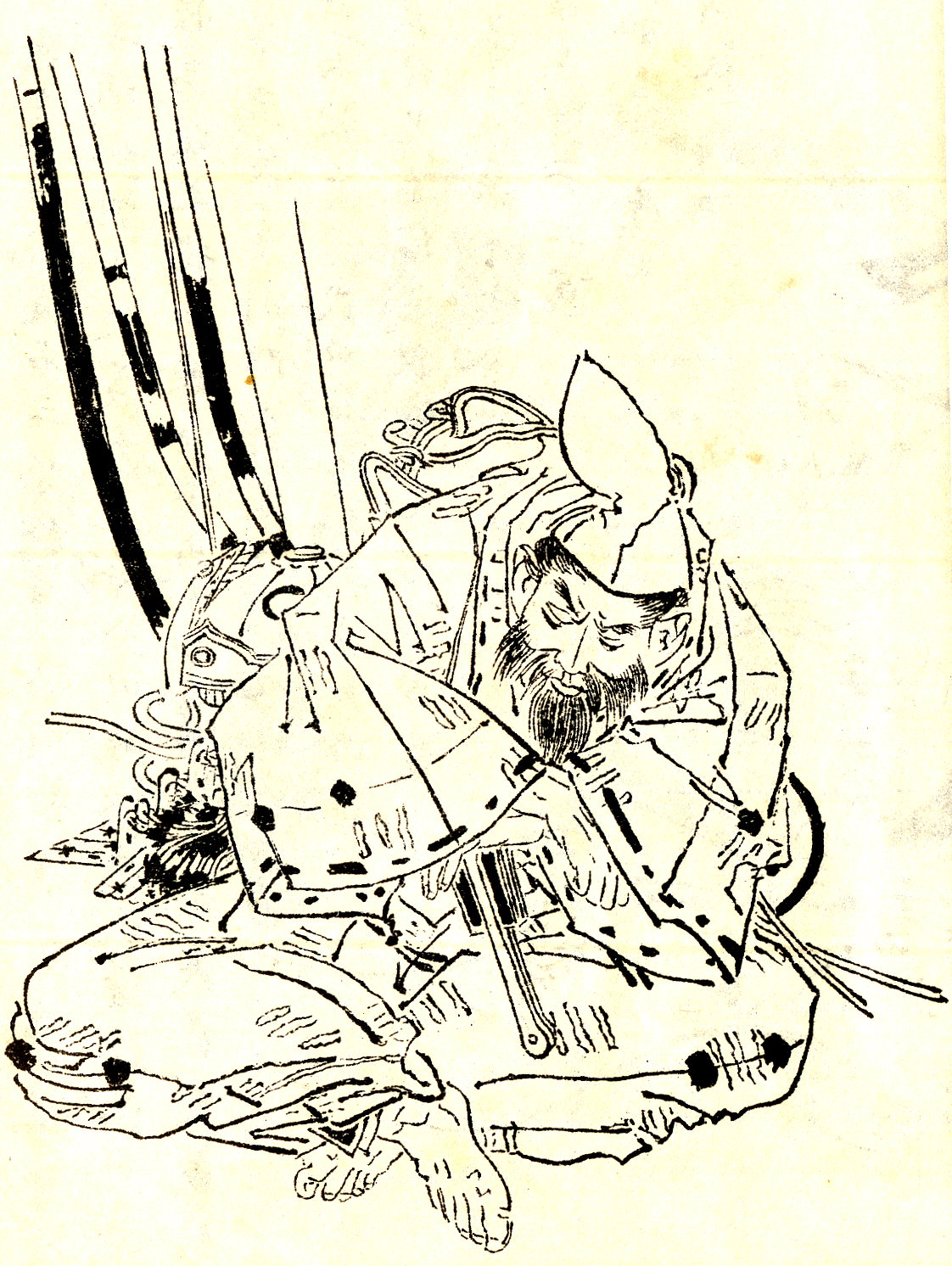
- Yoshimori Wada (1147–1213), Japanese samurai
- Pronunciation: joɕimoɾi (IPA)
- Gender: Male

Origin
- Origin: Japanese
- Meaning: Different meanings depending on the kanji used

Other names
- Alternative spelling: Yosimori (Kunrei-shiki) Yosimori (Nihon-shiki) Yoshimori (Hepburn)

Yoshimori is both a masculine Japanese given name and a Japanese surname.

== Written forms ==
Yoshimori can be written using many different combinations of kanji characters. Here are some examples:

- 義盛, "justice, prosper"
- 義守, "justice, protect"
- 義森, "justice, forest"
- 佳盛, "skilled, prosper"
- 佳守, "skilled, protect"
- 佳森, "skilled, forest"
- 善盛, "virtuous, prosper"
- 善守, "virtuous, protect"
- 善森, "virtuous, forest"
- 吉盛, "good luck, prosper"
- 吉守, "good luck, protect"
- 吉森, "good luck, forest"
- 良盛, "good, prosper"
- 良守, "good, protect"
- 良森, "good, forest"
- 恭盛, "respectful, prosper"
- 嘉盛, "excellent, prosper"
- 嘉守, "excellent, protect"
- 能盛, "capacity, prosper"
- 喜盛, "rejoice, prosper"

The name can also be written in hiragana よしもり or katakana ヨシモリ.

== Notable people with the given name Yoshimori ==
- Yoshimori Fujizakura (富士櫻 栄守; born 1948), Japanese sumo wrestler
- Yoshimori Takanoiwa (貴ノ岩 義司; born 1990), Mongolian sumo wrestler
- Yoshimori Wada (和田 義盛; 1147–1213), Japanese samurai

== Notable people with the surname Yoshimori ==
- Makoto Yoshimori (吉森 信; born 1969), Japanese composer and pianist
