= 2003 in sumo =

The following are the events in professional sumo during 2003.

== Tournaments ==
=== Hatsu basho ===
Ryogoku Kokugikan, Tokyo, 12 January – 26 January

2003 Hatsu basho results - Makuuchi Division
W		L		A	East			Rank	West			W		L		A
0	-	0	-	15	ø	(United States)	Musashimaru	Y	ø	(Japan)	Takanohana	4	-	4	-	1
14	-	1	-	0		(Mongolia)	**Asashōryū**	O		(Japan)	**Musōyama**	8	-	7	-	0
0	-	6	-	9	ø	(Japan)	Tochiazuma	O	ø	(Japan)	Chiyotaikai	0	-	0	-	15
0	-	0	-	15	ø	(Japan)	Kaiō	O	ø							
9	-	6	-	0		(Japan)	**Takanowaka**	S		(Japan)	**Kotomitsuki**	9	-	6	-	0
7	-	8	-	0		(Japan)	Takanonami	K		(Japan)	**Wakanosato**	11	-	4	-	0
8	-	7	-	0		(Japan)	**Tosanoumi**	M1	ø	(Japan)	Miyabiyama	1	-	3	-	11
8	-	7	-	0		(Mongolia)	**Kyokutenhō**	M2		(Japan)	Tōki	4	-	11	-	0
7	-	8	-	0		(Japan)	Kotonowaka	M3		(Japan)	**Dejima**	11	-	4	-	0
4	-	11	-	0		(Japan)	Aminishiki	M4		(Japan)	Tokitsuumi	5	-	10	-	0
7	-	8	-	0		(Japan)	Kaihō	M5		(Japan)	Iwakiyama	7	-	8	-	0
4	-	11	-	0		(Japan)	Hokutōriki	M6		(Mongolia)	Kyokushūzan	7	-	8	-	0
8	-	7	-	0		(Japan)	**Wakanoyama**	M7		(Japan)	**Shimotori**	9	-	6	-	0
8	-	7	-	0		(Japan)	**Tamanoshima**	M8		(Japan)	**Kotoryū**	8	-	7	-	0
10	-	5	-	0		(Japan)	**Takamisakari**	M9		(Japan)	Akinoshima	6	-	9	-	0
11	-	4	-	0		(Japan)	**Tochinonada**	M10		(Japan)	Gojōrō	5	-	10	-	0
5	-	10	-	0		(Japan)	Jūmonji	M11		(Japan)	Kasuganishiki	7	-	8	-	0
0	-	5	-	10	ø	(Japan)	Tamakasuga	M12		(Japan)	**Takanotsuru**	9	-	6	-	0
4	-	11	-	0		(Japan)	Ōtsukasa	M13		(South Korea)	**Kasugaō**	10	-	5	-	0
5	-	10	-	0		(Japan)	Kōbō	M14		(Japan)	Tochinohana	7	-	8	-	0
8	-	7	-	0		(Japan)	**Tamarikidō**	M15	ø							

ø - Indicates a pull-out or absent rank
**winning record in bold**
**Yusho Winner**

=== Haru basho ===
Osaka Prefectural Gymnasium, Osaka, 9 March – 23 March

2003 Haru basho results - Makuuchi Division
W		L		A	East			Rank	West			W		L		A
0	-	0	-	15	ø	(United States)	Musashimaru	Y		(Mongolia)	**Asashōryū**	10	-	5	-	0
1	-	6	-	8	ø	(Japan)	Musōyama	O	ø	(Japan)	Tochiazuma	0	-	0	-	15
12	-	3	-	0		(Japan)	**Chiyotaikai**	O		(Japan)	**Kaiō**	10	-	5	-	0
0	-	0	-	15	ø	(Japan)	Takanowaka	S		(Japan)	Kotomitsuki	6	-	9	-	0
9	-	6	-	0		(Japan)	**Wakanosato**	S	ø							
8	-	7	-	0		(Japan)	**Dejima**	K		(Japan)	**Tosanoumi**	8	-	7	-	0
7	-	8	-	0		(Japan)	Takanonami	M1		(Mongolia)	**Kyokutenhō**	9	-	6	-	0
9	-	6	-	0		(Japan)	**Tochinonada**	M2		(Japan)	**Takamisakari**	8	-	7	-	0
3	-	7	-	5	ø	(Japan)	Shimotori	M3		(Japan)	Kotonowaka	7	-	8	-	0
4	-	11	-	0		(Japan)	Wakanoyama	M4		(Japan)	**Tamanoshima**	8	-	7	-	0
5	-	10	-	0		(Japan)	Kotoryū	M5		(Japan)	**Kaihō**	8	-	7	-	0
6	-	5	-	4	ø	(Japan)	Iwakiyama	M6		(Japan)	Tōki	5	-	10	-	0
8	-	7	-	0		(South Korea)	**Kasugaō**	M7		(Mongolia)	**Kyokushūzan**	10	-	5	-	0
8	-	5	-	2	ø	(Japan)	**Tokitsuumi**	M8		(Japan)	Takanotsuru	4	-	11	-	0
8	-	7	-	0		(Japan)	**Aminishiki**	M9		(Japan)	**Miyabiyama**	9	-	6	-	0
6	-	9	-	0		(Mongolia)	Asasekiryū	M10		(Japan)	Buyūzan	7	-	8	-	0
10	-	5	-	0		(Japan)	**Hokutōriki**	M11		(Japan)	**Tamarikidō**	8	-	7	-	0
5	-	10	-	0		(Japan)	Kinkaiyama	M12		(Japan)	Akinoshima	6	-	9	-	0
6	-	9	-	0		(Japan)	Kasuganishiki	M13	ø	(Japan)	Takekaze	1	-	4	-	11
9	-	6	-	0		(Japan)	**Gojōrō**	M14		(Japan)	**Jūmonji**	9	-	6	-	0
5	-	10	-	0		(Japan)	Tochinohana	M15	ø							

ø - Indicates a pull-out or absent rank
**winning record in bold**
**Yusho Winner**

=== Natsu basho ===
Ryogoku Kokugikan, Tokyo, 11 May – 25 May

2003 Natsu basho results - Makuuchi Division
W		L		A	East			Rank	West			W		L		A
13	-	2	-	0		(Mongolia)	**Asashōryū**	Y	ø	(United States)	Musashimaru	0	-	0	-	15
10	-	5	-	0		(Japan)	**Chiyotaikai**	O		(Japan)	**Kaiō**	11	-	4	-	0
8	-	7	-	0		(Japan)	**Musōyama**	O		(Japan)	**Tochiazuma**	8	-	7	-	0
9	-	6	-	0		(Japan)	**Wakanosato**	S		(Japan)	Dejima	7	-	8	-	0
4	-	11	-	0		(Japan)	Tosanoumi	K		(Mongolia)	**Kyokutenhō**	10	-	5	-	0
8	-	7	-	0		(Japan)	**Tochinonada**	M1		(Japan)	Takamisakari	6	-	9	-	0
0	-	5	-	10	ø	(Japan)	Kotomitsuki	M2		(Japan)	Takanonami	7	-	8	-	0
8	-	7	-	0		(Mongolia)	**Kyokushūzan**	M3		(Japan)	Tamanoshima	7	-	8	-	0
5	-	10	-	0		(Japan)	Kaihō	M4		(Japan)	**Kotonowaka**	8	-	7	-	0
10	-	5	-	0		(Japan)	**Miyabiyama**	M5		(Japan)	Hokutōriki	6	-	9	-	0
4	-	11	-	0		(South Korea)	Kasugaō	M6	ø	(Japan)	Takanowaka	0	-	2	-	13
0	-	0	-	15	ø	(Japan)	Tokitsuumi	M7		(Japan)	**Aminishiki**	11	-	4	-	0
7	-	8	-	0		(Japan)	Tamarikidō	M8		(Japan)	Gojōrō	7	-	8	-	0
8	-	7	-	0		(Japan)	**Jūmonji**	M9		(Japan)	Iwakiyama	7	-	8	-	0
9	-	6	-	0		(Japan)	**Kotoryū**	M10		(Japan)	Wakanoyama	6	-	9	-	0
10	-	5	-	0		(Japan)	**Tōki**	M11		(Japan)	Shimotori	4	-	11	-	0
9	-	6	-	0		(Japan)	**Buyūzan**	M12		(Japan)	Aogiyama	7	-	8	-	0
6	-	9	-	0		(Japan)	Yōtsukasa	M13		(Mongolia)	**Asasekiryū**	8	-	7	-	0
0	-	11	-	4	ø	(Japan)	Takanotsuru	M14		(Japan)	**Ōtsukasa**	8	-	7	-	0
8	-	7	-	0		(Japan)	**Asanowaka**	M15		(Japan)	Akinoshima	6	-	9	-	0

ø - Indicates a pull-out or absent rank
**winning record in bold**
**Yusho Winner**

=== Nagoya basho ===
Aichi Prefectural Gymnasium, Nagoya, 6 July – 20 July

2003 Nagoya basho results - Makuuchi Division
W		L		A	East			Rank	West			W		L		A
5	-	5	-	5	ø	(Mongolia)	Asashōryū	Y	ø	(United States)	Musashimaru	2	-	4	-	9
12	-	3	-	0		(Japan)	**Kaiō**	O		(Japan)	**Chiyotaikai**	11	-	4	-	0
10	-	5	-	0		(Japan)	**Musōyama**	O		(Japan)	Tochiazuma	7	-	8	-	0
10	-	5	-	0		(Japan)	**Wakanosato**	S		(Mongolia)	Kyokutenhō	6	-	9	-	0
0	-	0	-	15	ø	(Japan)	Dejima	K		(Japan)	Tochinonada	7	-	8	-	0
10	-	5	-	0		(Japan)	**Miyabiyama**	M1	ø	(Japan)	Aminishiki	2	-	12	-	1
4	-	11	-	0		(Mongolia)	Kyokushūzan	M2	ø	(Japan)	Kotonowaka	1	-	2	-	12
6	-	9	-	0		(Japan)	Takanonami	M3		(Japan)	**Takamisakari**	9	-	6	-	0
5	-	10	-	0		(Japan)	Tamanoshima	M4		(Japan)	**Tōki**	10	-	5	-	0
10	-	5	-	0		(Japan)	**Tosanoumi**	M5		(Japan)	**Kotoryū**	8	-	7	-	0
6	-	9	-	0		(Japan)	Jūmonji	M6		(Japan)	Buyūzan	7	-	8	-	0
9	-	6	-	0		(Japan)	**Tokitsuumi**	M7		(Japan)	**Hokutōriki**	10	-	5	-	0
6	-	9	-	0		(Japan)	Kaihō	M8		(Japan)	Tamarikidō	6	-	9	-	0
4	-	4	-	7	ø	(Japan)	Gojōrō	M9		(Mongolia)	**Asasekiryū**	10	-	5	-	0
9	-	6	-	0		(Japan)	**Iwakiyama**	M10		(Japan)	Ōtsukasa	5	-	10	-	0
6	-	9	-	0		(Japan)	Asanowaka	M11		(Japan)	**Tochisakae**	8	-	7	-	0
9	-	6	-	0		(Japan)	**Kasuganishiki**	M12		(South Korea)	Kasugaō	4	-	11	-	0
9	-	6	-	0		(Japan)	**Kotomitsuki**	M13		(Japan)	Wakanoyama	7	-	8	-	0
7	-	8	-	0		(Japan)	Ushiomaru	M14		(Japan)	Aogiyama	4	-	11	-	0
7	-	8	-	0		(Japan)	Tamakasuga	M15		(Japan)	**Kinkaiyama**	9	-	6	-	0

ø - Indicates a pull-out or absent rank
**winning record in bold**
**Yusho Winner**

=== Aki basho ===
Ryogoku Kokugikan, Tokyo, 7 September – 21 September

2003 Aki basho results - Makuuchi Division
W		L		A	East			Rank	West			W		L		A
13	-	2	-	0		(Mongolia)	**Asashōryū**	Y	ø	(United States)	Musashimaru	0	-	0	-	15
7	-	8	-	0		(Japan)	Kaiō	O		(Japan)	**Chiyotaikai**	11	-	4	-	0
1	-	5	-	9		(Japan)	Musōyama	O		(Japan)	**Tochiazuma**	10	-	5	-	0
11	-	4	-	0		(Japan)	**Wakanosato**	S		(Japan)	Miyabiyama	4	-	11	-	0
7	-	8	-	0		(Japan)	Tōki	K		(Japan)	Tosanoumi	7	-	8	-	0
9	-	6	-	0		(Japan)	**Takamisakari**	M1		(Japan)	**Tochinonada**	8	-	7	-	0
10	-	5	-	0		(Mongolia)	**Kyokutenhō**	M2		(Japan)	Hokutōriki	4	-	11	-	0
4	-	11	-	0		(Japan)	Kotoryū	M3		(Japan)	Tokitsuumi	5	-	10	-	0
7	-	8	-	0		(Mongolia)	Asasekiryū	M4		(Japan)	Takanonami	7	-	8	-	0
11	-	4	-	0		(Japan)	**Iwakiyama**	M5		(Japan)	Kasuganishiki	5	-	10	-	0
11	-	4	-	0		(Japan)	**Kotomitsuki**	M6		(Japan)	Tochisakae	5	-	10	-	0
7	-	8	-	0		(Japan)	Buyūzan	M7		(Japan)	**Tamanoshima**	9	-	6	-	0
8	-	7	-	0		(Mongolia)	**Kyokushūzan**	M8		(Japan)	Jūmonji	7	-	8	-	0
8	-	7	-	0		(Japan)	**Kinkaiyama**	M9		(Japan)	**Aminishiki**	10	-	5	-	0
6	-	9	-	0		(Japan)	Dejima	M10		(Japan)	Kaihō	5	-	10	-	0
8	-	7	-	0		(Japan)	**Kakizoe**	M11		(Japan)	Tamarikidō	6	-	9	-	0
0	-	0	-	15	ø	(Japan)	Kotonowaka	M12		(Japan)	**Shimotori**	8	-	7	-	0
8	-	7	-	0		(Japan)	**Wakatoba**	M13		(Japan)	Yōtsukasa	7	-	8	-	0
6	-	9	-	0		(Japan)	Asanowaka	M14		(Japan)	Wakanoyama	7	-	8	-	0
8	-	7	-	0		(Japan)	**Ōtsukasa**	M15		(Japan)	Ushiomaru	6	-	9	-	0

ø - Indicates a pull-out or absent rank
**winning record in bold**
**Yusho Winner**

=== Kyushu basho ===
Fukuoka International Centre, Kyushu, 9 November – 23 November

2003 Kyushu basho results - Makuuchi Division
W		L		A	East			Rank	West			W		L		A
12	-	3	-	0		(Mongolia)	**Asashōryū**	Y	ø	(United States)	Musashimaru	3	-	5	-	0
10	-	5	-	0		(Japan)	**Chiyotaikai**	O		(Japan)	**Tochiazuma**	13	-	2	-	0
10	-	5	-	0		(Japan)	**Kaiō**	O		(Japan)	**Musōyama**	9	-	6	-	0
7	-	8	-	0		(Japan)	Wakanosato	S		(Mongolia)	Kyokutenhō	4	-	11	-	0
5	-	10	-	0		(Japan)	Takamisakari	K		(Japan)	Iwakiyama	6	-	9	-	0
8	-	7	-	0		(Japan)	**Tochinonada**	M1		(Japan)	Kotomitsuki	6	-	9	-	0
9	-	6	-	0		(Japan)	**Tōki**	M2		(Japan)	**Tosanoumi**	10	-	5	-	0
5	-	10	-	0		(Japan)	Aminishiki	M3		(Japan)	**Tamanoshima**	10	-	5	-	0
6	-	9	-	0		(Japan)	Miyabiyama	M4		(Mongolia)	Asasekiryū	3	-	12	-	0
5	-	10	-	0		(Japan)	Takanonami	M5		(Mongolia)	**Kyokushūzan**	8	-	7	-	0
6	-	9	-	0		(Japan)	Kinkaiyama	M6		(Japan)	**Tokitsuumi**	8	-	7	-	0
10	-	5	-	0		(Japan)	**Hokutōriki**	M7		(Japan)	Kotoryū	7	-	8	-	0
4	-	11	-	0		(Japan)	Buyūzan	M8		(Japan)	**Kakizoe**	8	-	7	-	0
8	-	7	-	0		(Japan)	**Kasuganishiki**	M9		(Japan)	**Shimotori**	8	-	7	-	0
8	-	7	-	0		(Japan)	**Jūmonji**	M10		(Japan)	Tochisakae	7	-	8	-	0
7	-	8	-	0		(Japan)	Wakatoba	M11		(Japan)	**Takekaze**	9	-	6	-	0
7	-	3	-	5	ø	(Japan)	Kotonowaka	M12		(Japan)	Takanowaka	7	-	8	-	0
6	-	9	-	0		(Japan)	Tamakasuga	M13		(Japan)	Ōtsukasa	5	-	10	-	0
6	-	9	-	0		(Japan)	Toyozakura	M14		(Japan)	**Dejima**	11	-	4	-	0
2	-	6	-	7	ø	(Japan)	Tamarikidō	M15		(Japan)	**Yōtsukasa**	9	-	6	-	0

ø - Indicates a pull-out or absent rank
**winning record in bold**
**Yusho Winner**

== News ==
=== January ===
- At the Hatsu basho in Tokyo, Takanohana, winner of 22 tournament championships, announces his retirement from sumo after eight years as a yokozuna, after suffering three defeats in the first seven days. He had suffered many injury problems and had only recently returned from a seven tournament layoff. His fellow yokozuna Musashimaru sits out the whole tournament after injuring his wrist in the previous tourney. Also missing are ozeki Kaio and Chiyotaikai, and Tochiazuma who drops out after five losses in a row. In their absence, ozeki Asashoryu wins his second successive makuuchi division championship, with a 14–1 record, and is promoted to yokozuna. He becomes the third foreigner, and first Mongolian, to reach sumo's highest rank. Komusubi Wakanosato, and maegashira Dejima and Tochinonada, are runners-up on 11–4. Wakanosato is awarded the Fighting Spirit prize along with Korean Kasugao. The juryo division championship is won by Asashoryu's stablemate Asasekiryu who defeats Buyuzan in a playoff.
- Former komusubi Ryogoku inherits the toshiyori name of Sakaigawa from former yokozuna Sadanoyama, and changes the name of his stable from Nakadachi to Sakaigawa stable.

=== February ===
- Former sekiwake Takatoriki takes over the running of Otake stable from his father-in-law, former yokozuna Taiho.
- Former sekiwake Tochinowaka takes over the running of Kasugano stable from former yokozuna Tochinoumi.

=== March ===
- At the Haru basho in Osaka, Chiyotaikai returns from injury to win his third top division championship with a 12–3 record. Asashoryu scores 10–5 in his debut tournament as a yokozuna, enough for the runner-up position alongside Kaio and maegashira Kyokushuzan and Hokutoriki. Musashimaru and Tochiazuma sit the tournament out. Musoyama pulls out after five losses in the first six days. Kyokushuzan's stablemate Kyokutenho wins the Fighting Spirit prize, and Takamisakari the Technique Award. Tochisakae wins the juryo championship. Veteran former komusubi Daizen retires after 22 years in sumo, as does former juryo wrestler Susanoumi, the heaviest Japanese rikishi ever at some 240 kg.

=== May ===
- At the Natsu basho in Tokyo, Asashoryu takes his first championship as a yokozuna with a 13–2 record. Kaio is runner-up on 11–4, alongside maegashira Aminishiki who wins the Technique Prize. Chiyotaikai finishes on 10–5. Musōyama returns to preserve his ōzeki rank with an 8–7 record. He had been denied kosho seido status, with the Japan Sumo Association feeling that the system was being abused with Kaiō and Chiyotaikai both sitting out in January despite reportedly being fit enough to compete. Kyokushuzan wins the Outstanding Performance prize for his victory over Asashoryu, his first in six attempts. Kyokutenho receives the Fighting Spirit prize for the second tournament in a row, for his fine 10–5 score at komusubi, and is promoted to sekiwake for the first time. Tamakasuga wins the juryo championship and returns to the top division. Former sekiwake Akinoshima, who has been ranked continuously in makuuchi since July 1988 and is the last top division wrestler from the Shōwa era still active in sumo, retires at the age of 36 after a 6–9 score relegates him to juryo.
- 31: The danpatsu-shiki or retirement ceremony of popular former sekiwake Terao is held at the Kokugikan.

=== June ===
- 1: Takanohana's retirement ceremony takes place at the Kokugikan. He performs the yokozuna dohyo-iri or ring entering ceremony for the last time, and his hair is cut by his uncle Wakanohana Kanji I, his brother Wakanohana Masaru, and finally his father Takanohana Kenshi. The event is broadcast live on Japanese television.

=== July ===
- At the Nagoya basho, Kaio wins his fourth top division championship with a 12–3 record after defeating fellow ozeki Chiyotaikai on the final day. Chiyotaikai finishes runner-up on 11–4. Musashimaru returns for the first time since November 2002 but drops out once again with a recurrence of his wrist problem. Asashoryu also withdraws through injury. He had been disqualified from a bout earlier in the tournament after pulling on the chonmage of Mongolian rival Kyokushuzan, the first yokozuna ever to suffer a disqualification. The two wrestlers scuffle in the bathroom after the match, and Asashoryu also breaks the wing mirror of Kyokushuzan's car. Takamisakari, who had defeated both yokozuna, receives his first Outstanding Performance awarded Tokitsuumi receives his third Technique Prize. The juryo division championship is won by Kakizoe.

=== September ===
- The Sumo Association chairman Kitanoumi holds a press conference and confirms the abolition of the kosho seido (public injury) system after the November 2003 tournament, and increasing the number of sekitori from January 2004 (42 from 40 in makuuchi and 28 from 26 in juryo). In the last year, 10 top division wrestlers and 11 juryo wrestlers received the status, the most ever, and the Sumo Association feels it was getting out of hand. In addition, Musōyama was refused kosho status after his injury in the March tournament was deemed to be an old shoulder injury, and yet still competed in May and got eight wins.
- At the Aki basho in Tokyo, Asashoryu wins his second championship as a yokozuna, third of the year, and fourth overall, with a 13–2 record. He finishes two wins ahead on a trio of wrestlers on 11–4: Chiyotaikai, sekiwake Wakanosato and maegashira Iwakiyama. Kaio, who had been told a 15–0 score was necessary for yokozuna promotion, can only manage 7–8. Musashimaru sits the tournament out. Wakanosato receives the Outstanding performance Award while Iwakiyama wins the Technique prize and Kyokutenho and Takamisakari share the Fighting spirit prize. Takekaze wins the juryo championship.

=== November ===
- Former yokozuna Akebono announces he is leaving his oyakata position to become a K-1 fighter.
- At the Kyushu basho, Musashimaru retires after his second attempted comeback ends in failure, losing four matches in the first seven days. He is the last wrestler from Hawaii in sumo, a legacy that began with Takamiyama in 1964. Lower down the ranks, former maegashira Aogiyama and the American born Sentoryu also announce their retirements. Ozeki Tochiazuma wins the makuuchi championship, his second, with a score of 13–2. Asashoryu finishes in second place, one win behind, after losing to Tochiazuma on the final day. Veterans Tochinonada and Tosanoumi, with three wins over yokozuna between them in this basho, share the Outstanding Performance Prize. Tamanoshima wins the Fighting Spirit prize. In the juryo division Georgian Kokkai wins the championship with a fine 14–1 record and becomes the first Caucasian to be promoted to the top division. The makushita yusho is won by veteran Daimanazuru, with an unbeaten 7–0 score, who earns promotion to the sekitori ranks for the first time. Runner-up on 6–1 is the 18-year-old Mongolian Hakuho, who is also promoted to juryo.

=== December ===
- Former maegashira Higonoumi branches out from Mihogaseki stable and opens up his own Kise stable.

== Deaths ==
- 28 April: Yamawake Oyakata, who as the former maegashira Tochifuji defeated Taiho in the yokozuna's final tournament in May 1971, dies aged 56.
- 17 July: Maeda Yoritaka, an apprentice at the Kitanoumi stable, aged 15, of Cardiomyopathy. He is the only sumo wrestler to have died without taking ever taking part in an official tournament.
- 17 December: Former komusubi Fujinishiki, also the former head of the Takasago stable, dies of liver disease aged 66. Asashoryu is criticised for not returning from Mongolia to attend his funeral.

== See also ==
- Glossary of sumo terms
- List of past sumo wrestlers
- List of years in sumo
- List of yokozuna
