= Hidenokuni Hajime =

British sumo wrestler

Personal information
- Native name: 英ノ国 一
- Born: Nathan John Strange; 23 August 1971 (age 55) Edgware, London, United Kingdom
- Height: 1.93 m (6 ft 4 in)
- Weight: 102 kg (225 lb)

Sport
- Sport: Sumo
- Retired: May, 1990
- Heya: Azumazeki
- Record: 9-5-14
- Debut: September 1989
- Highest rank: Jonidan 89 (March 1990)
- Updated on December 2017

Hidenokuni Hajime (英ノ国一; born 23 August 1971 as Nathan John Strange) is a former professional sumo wrestler, who was active from 1989 until 1990. The highest rank he reached was jonidan 89. He was the first professional sumo wrestler from the United Kingdom.

== Career ==
A former photographic printer from Edgware, London, he was inspired to join sumo after seeing broadcasts on Channel 4. After months of training in martial arts techniques with Syd Hoare of the British Sumo Association, he went to Japan and joined the Azumazeki stable run by former sekiwake Takamiyama, who had already taken on a number of foreign recruits from Hawaii. Strange had written a number of letters to Azumazeki Oyakata asking to join. The name Hidenokuni was chosen to acknowledge his pioneering status as the first ever rikishi from the United Kingdom: the first and last characters of Hidenokuni together mean England. Hajime is a common given name in Japan, and can be taken to mean start or beginning. He found it difficult to adjust to the sumo diet of chankonabe and instead of gaining weight, he lost 22 kilograms (49 lb) in his first two months in Japan.

Hidenokuni's sumo career was short. After coming though maezumō (pre-sumo) in September 1989, he fought his first tournament in the bottom jonokuchi division in November 1989. In his second ever bout he fought future Yokozuna Musashimaru, who had joined sumo at the same time as him. Recording a 5–2 score, Hidenokuni had performed sufficiently well to be promoted to jonidan for the January 1990 tournament. He celebrated by going out to a disco with ōzeki Konishiki, who had just won the top division title. He again achieved kachi-koshi in January, meaning he had won 12 of his first 18 bouts. He had gained quite a lot of attention due to his status as the first ever European in sumo, and even started to receive fan mail. However, he also received very harsh treatment in training from his stablemates, who were not pleased at the attention he was getting, and this influenced his decision to return to England. He quit immediately after the March 1990 tournament, although he remained on the banzuke for the next tournament in May.

== Career record ==
Hidenokuni Hajime
Year	January Hatsu basho, Tokyo	March Haru basho, Osaka	May Natsu basho, Tokyo	July Nagoya basho, Nagoya	September Aki basho, Tokyo	November Kyūshū basho, Fukuoka
1989	x	x	x	x	(Maezumo)	West Jonokuchi #38; 5–2
1990	West Jonidan #123; 4–3	East Jonidan #89; 0–0–7	West Jonokuchi #7; Retired; 0–0–7	x	x	x
Record given as wins–losses–absences Top division champion Top division runner-up Retired Lower divisions Non-participation Sanshō key: F=Fighting spirit; O=Outstanding performance; T=Technique Also shown: ★=Kinboshi; P=Playoff(s); Divisions: Makuuchi — Jūryō — Makushita — Sandanme — Jonidan — Jonokuchi Makuuchi ranks: Yokozuna — Ōzeki — Sekiwake — Komusubi — Maegashira

== See also ==
- Glossary of sumo terms
- List of non-Japanese sumo wrestlers
- List of past sumo wrestlers
