= Azumazeki stable =

Defunct sumo stable

Coordinates: 35.7064°N 139.8054°E

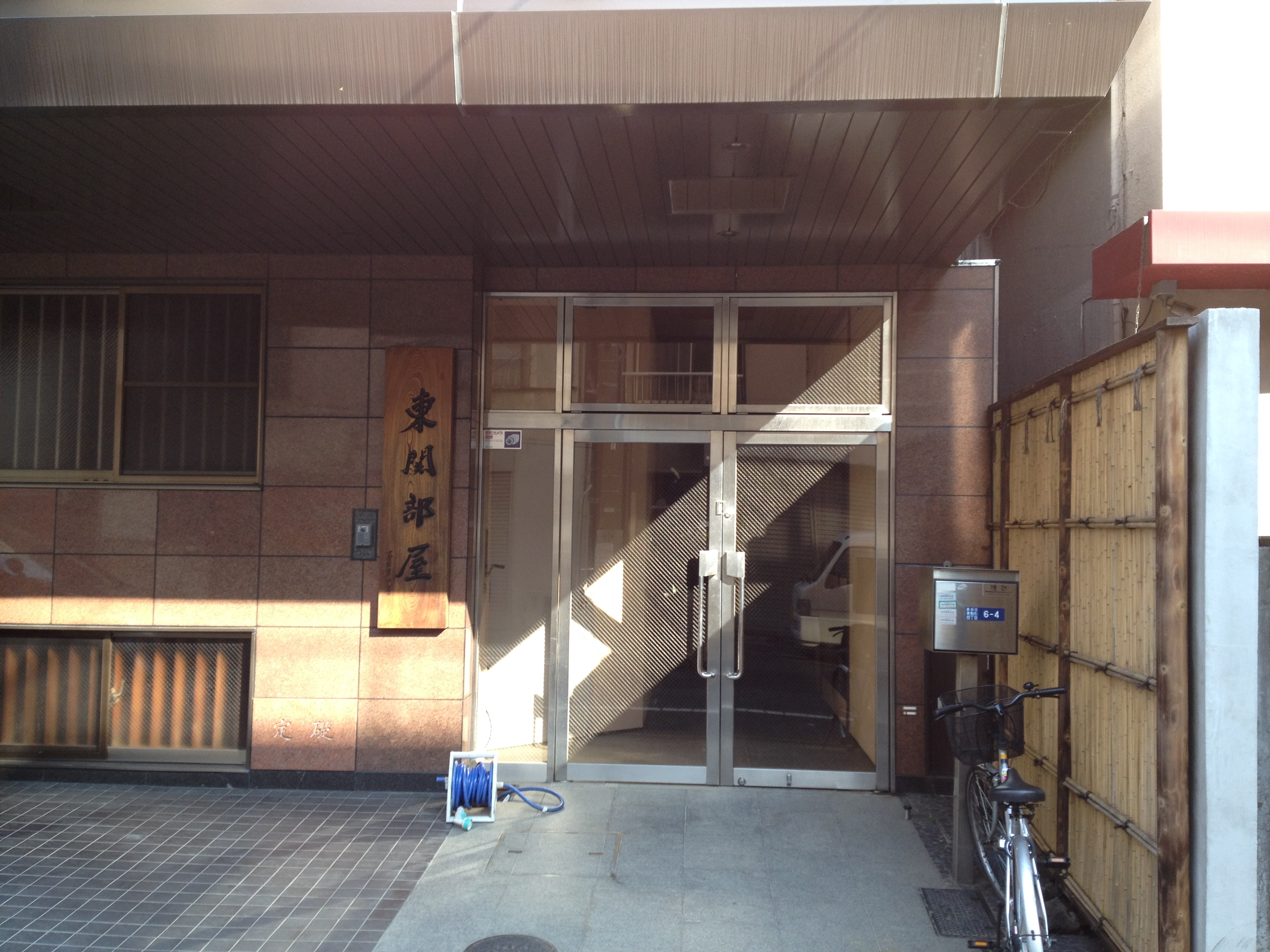
The Sumida premises in 2014

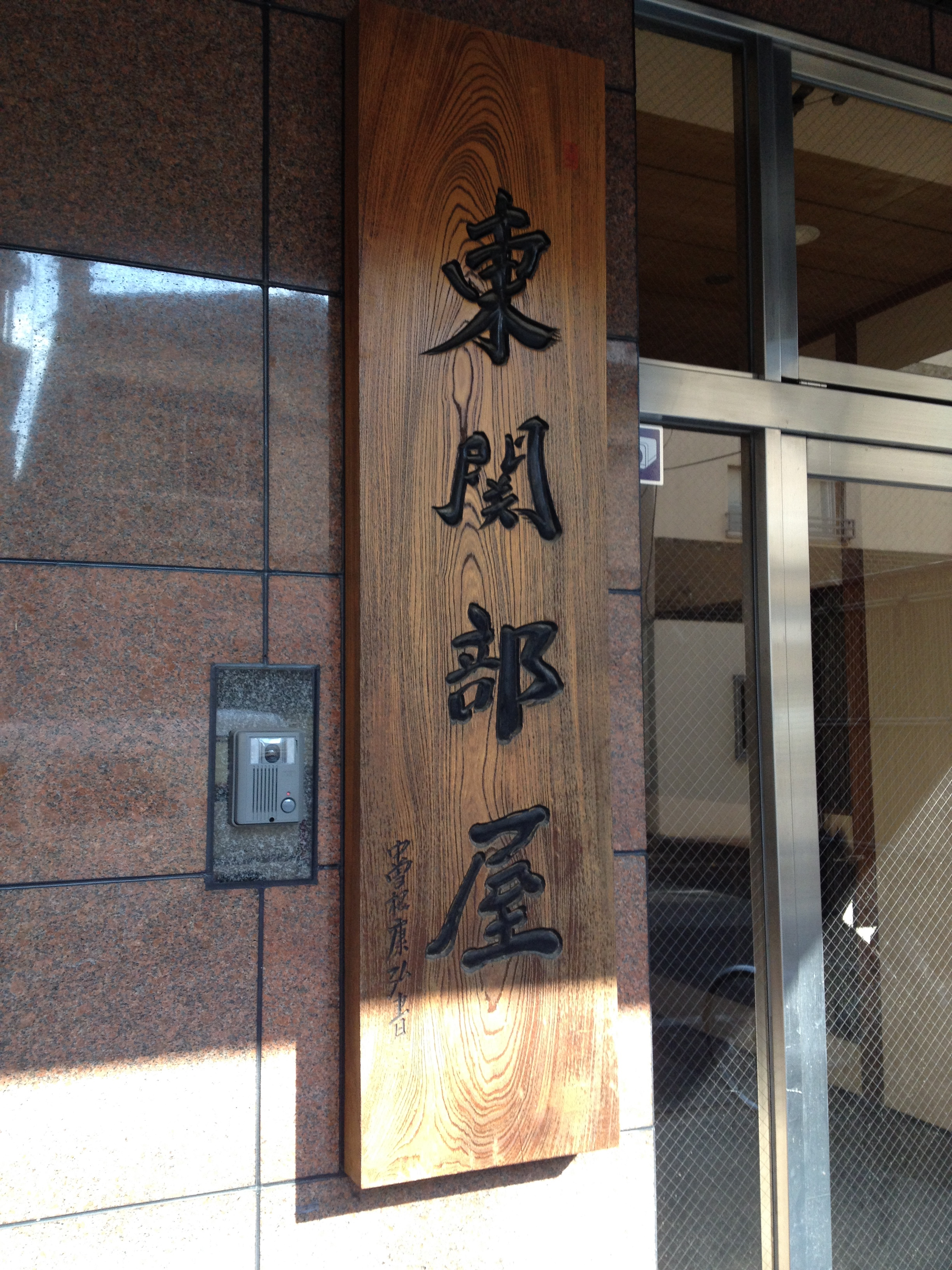
The Sumida premises in 2014

Azumazeki stable (東関部屋, Azumazeki-beya) was a stable of sumo wrestlers, part of the Takasago group of stables. It was founded in February 1986 by the Hawaiian born Takamiyama of the Takasago stable in Higashi–Komagata, Sumida, Tokyo. It was the first stable ever to be run by a foreign-born coach. Azumazeki's first sekitori was Akebono, also from Hawaii, in 1990, who subsequently reached the yokozuna rank. A total of nine foreign born wrestlers have fought for the stable: seven from the United States, one from Great Britain and one (Kosei) from China who retired in January 2017. The stable's first Japanese sekitori was Takamisakari. As of January 2021 it had seven wrestlers.

The former Takamiyama reached the mandatory retirement age of 65 in June 2009 and was succeeded by Ushiomaru who announced his retirement from active competition after the May tournament. In 2012 it absorbed Nakamura stable when Takamiyama's former stablemate Fujizakura retired as a coach upon turning 65.

In February 2018 the stable moved from Sumida to larger premises in Shibamata District, Katsushika. The opening was celebrated at the Ryōgoku Kokugikan with around 500 guests from the sumo world. The move was encouraged by the Katsushika ward, to help increase tourism.

Azumazeki died in December 2019 at the age of 41, and after the January 2020 tournament the former Takamisakari took over as Azumazeki-oyakata. However, this was on a provisional basis for one year only, and the Sumo Association announced the closure of the stable on April 1, 2021 due to no permanent successor to Ushiomaru being found, with the personnel moving to Hakkaku stable.

The stable's last premises were later taken over by Futagoyama stable. The original building used prior to 2018 still exists and was used for Kaonishiki's retirement ceremony in May 2021; from 2022 to 2024 it was home to the Miyagino stable.

== Ring name conventions ==
Some wrestlers at this stable took ring names or shikona that begin with the characters 高見 (read: takami), meaning high and view, in deference to the coach and owner, the former Takamiyama. Examples include Takamisato and Takamiryū.

== Owner ==
- 2019–2021: 14th Azumazeki Daigorō (iin, komusubi, Takamisakari, born 1976) – popularily known as "RoboCop".
- 2009–2019: 13th Azumazeki Daigorō (iin, maegashira 10, Ushiomaru, 1978–2019) – long-time tsukebito to yokozuna Akebono.
- 1986–2009: 12th Azumazeki Daigorō (sekiwake, Takamiyama, born 1944) – founder and first non-Japanese stablemaster.

== Notable wrestlers ==
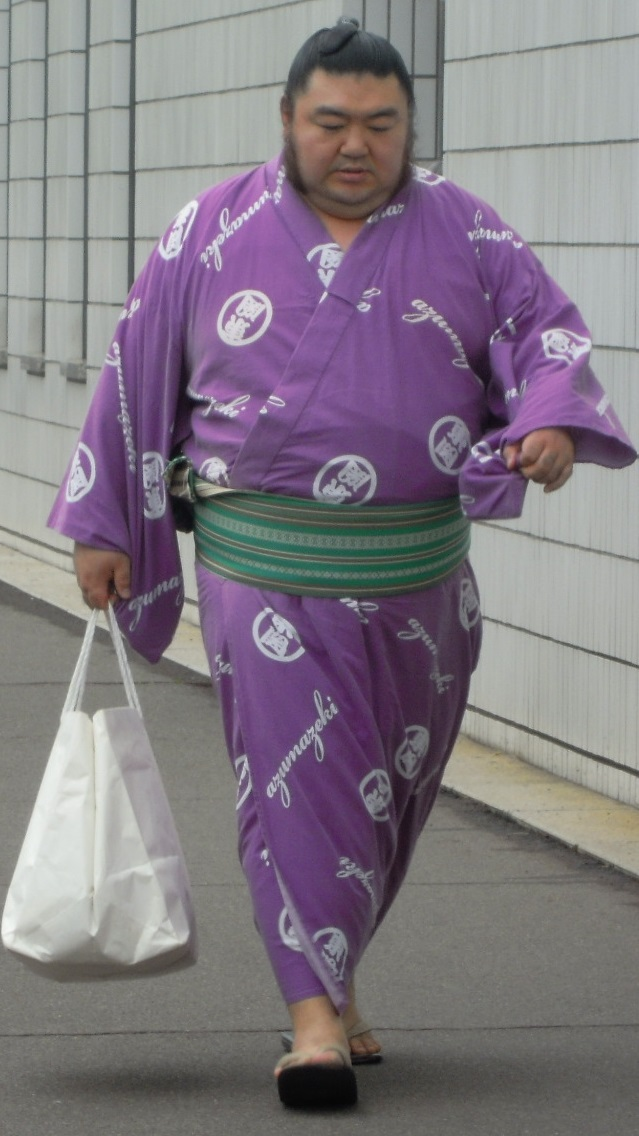
Kaōnishiki was the only wrestler at the stable with sekitori experience at its closure in 2021, and the last wrestler recruited by founder Takamiyama

- Akebono (64th yokozuna, 1969–2024) – first non-Japanese yokozuna.
- Kaōnishiki (best rank jūryō 6, 1978) – became a non-elder coach at Tagonoura stable.
- Daiki (jūryō 10, 1973–2005) – troubled and murdered in his native Hawaii.
- Takamishū (makushita 2, 1968–2024) – became an actor and fought in UFC 1.
- Naniwa (sandanme 98, born 1974) – became pro wrestler "Mammoth Sasaki".
- Hidenokuni (jonidan 89, born 1971) – first rikishi from the United Kingdom.

== Location and Access ==
- 2018–2021: 2-10-13 Shibamata, Katsushika Ward, Tokyo Prefecture 125-0052
- 1986–2018: Tokyo, Sumida Ward, Higashi Komagata 4-6-4

3 minute walk from Honjo-Azumabashi Station on Toei Asakusa Line

== See also ==
- List of sumo stables
- List of sumo elders
- List of active sumo wrestlers
- List of past sumo wrestlers
- List of years in sumo
- Glossary of sumo terms
