= Nakamura stable (1986–2012) =

Defunct sumo stable

Nakamura stable (中村部屋, Nakamura-beya) (1986–2012) was a sumo stable of the Takasago group.

It was established in its modern incarnation in May 1986 by Fujizakura of the Takasago stable. The stable's first sekitori was Saigo in November 1995. It did not produce any makuuchi wrestlers. As of December 2007 it had 14 sumo wrestlers. The stable had a policy of not recruiting foreigners or former collegiate competitors. Instead, the stablemaster only accepted new recruits out of middle school. However, he did allow his wrestlers to take high school correspondence courses over the internet.

The former Fujizakura reached the mandatory retirement age of 65 early in 2013 and as there was no successor available, the stable closed in December 2012 with five of its remaining wrestlers, including former jūryō Hishofuji, transferring to Azumazeki stable, and the other two retiring.

The stable's premises were subsequently used by the Musashigawa stable.

== Owner ==
- 1986–2013: 10th Nakamura (sekiwake Fujizakura)

== Notable wrestlers ==
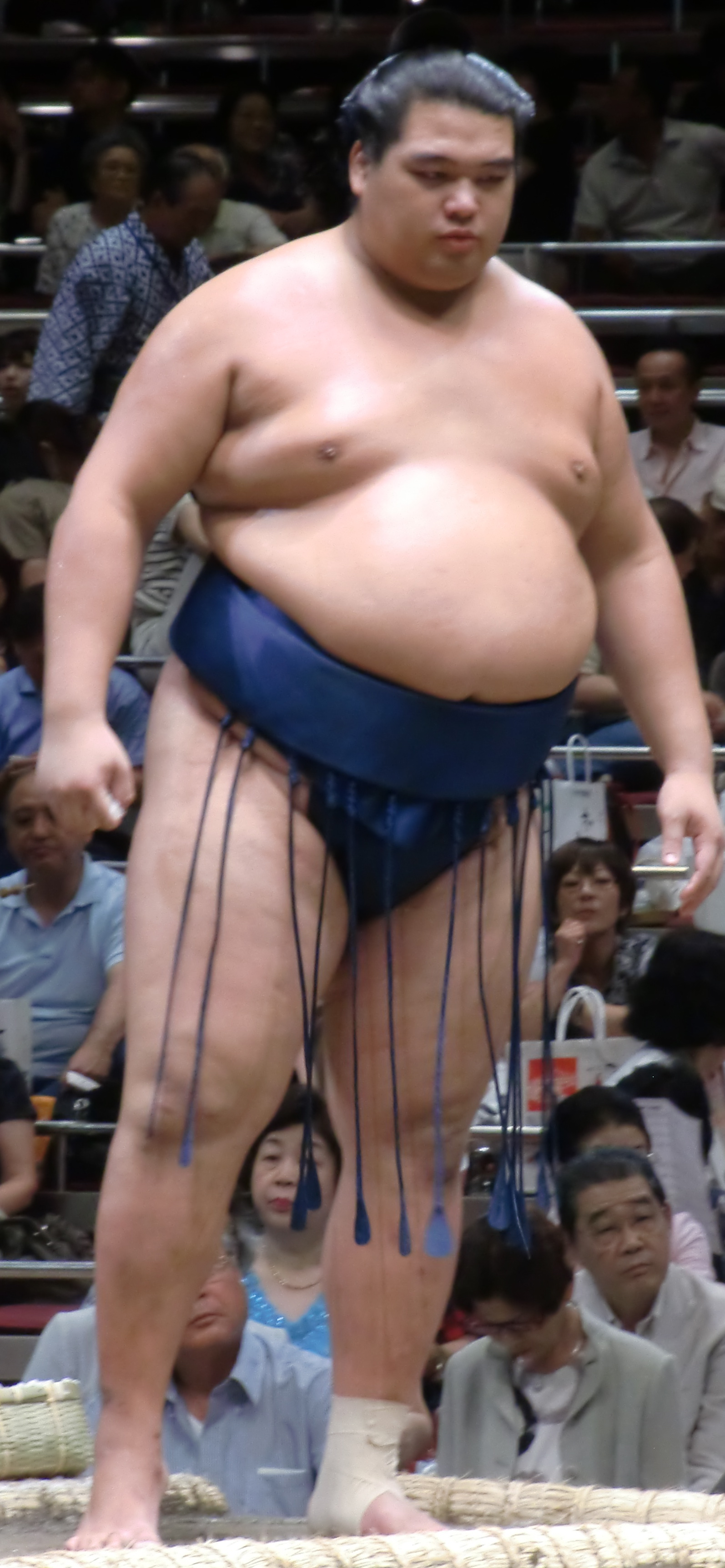
Hishofuji was the last of the four sekitori produced by Nakamura stable

- Saigo (jūryō)
- Sumanofuji (jūryō)
- Ichinotani (jūryō)
- Hishofuji (jūryō)

== See also ==
- List of sumo stables
- List of sumo elders
- List of active sumo wrestlers
- List of past sumo wrestlers
- List of years in sumo
- Glossary of sumo terms
