= Ushiomaru Motoyasu =

Japanese sumo wrestler (1978–2019)

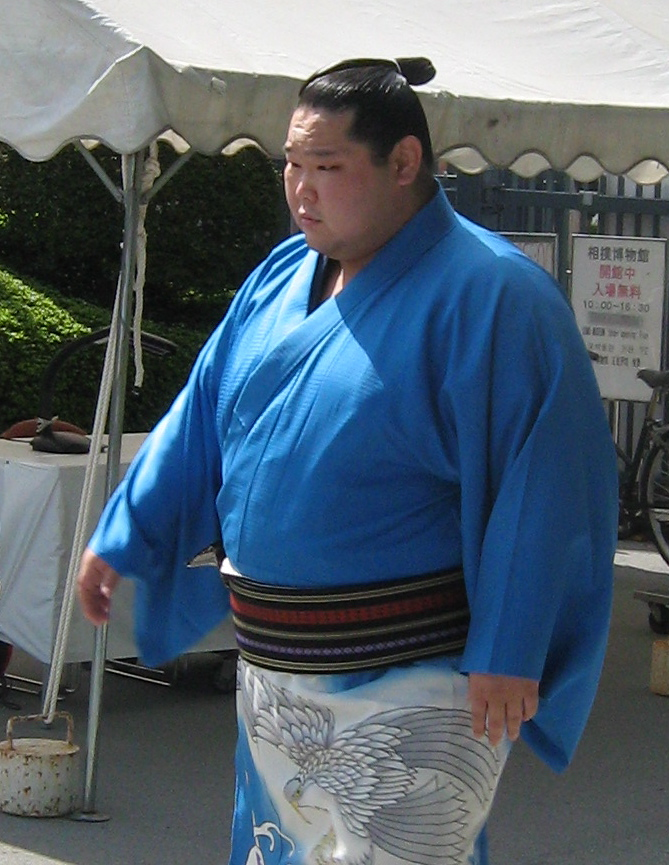
- Motoyasu in September 2008

Personal information
- Native name: 潮丸 元康
- Born: Motoyasu Sano; May 11, 1978 Shizuoka, Japan
- Died: December 13, 2019 (aged 41) Katsushika, Tokyo, Japan
- Height: 1.76 m (5 ft 9 1/2 in)
- Weight: 167 kg (368 lb)
- Website: http://ameblo.jp/ushiomaru-s/

Sport
- Sport: Sumo
- Retired: May 2009
- Heya: Azumazeki
- Record: 482-448-51
- Debut: March 1994
- Highest rank: Maegashira 10 (November 2002)
- Elder name: Azumazeki
- Championships: 1 (Jūryō); 1 (Makushita)
- Updated on December 16, 2019

Ushiomaru Motoyasu (born Motoyasu Sano; May 11, 1978 – December 13, 2019) was a Japanese sumo wrestler from Shizuoka,. He began his professional career in 1994 and first reached the top division in 2002. His highest rank was maegashira 10. He retired in May 2009 to take over the Azumazeki stable.

== Career ==
Ushiomaru made his debut in March 1994, joining Azumazeki stable. He began using the fighting name of Takamisano, switching briefly to Tenfuku before adopting his familiar name in November 1995. In his early career in the lower ranks, he served as a tsukebito, or personal attendant, to yokozuna Akebono. After a long stint in the third makushita division, he reached sekitori status by winning promotion to the second jūryō division in January 2002. After winning the jūryō division title in July of that year with a 13-2 record, he was promoted to the top makuuchi division for the next tournament. He was injured during his second top division tournament and had to withdraw, resulting in demotion back to the second division. He struggled in 2005, losing sekitori status on two occasions, but then made something of a comeback, returning to the top division for four straight tournaments from November 2006 to May 2007.

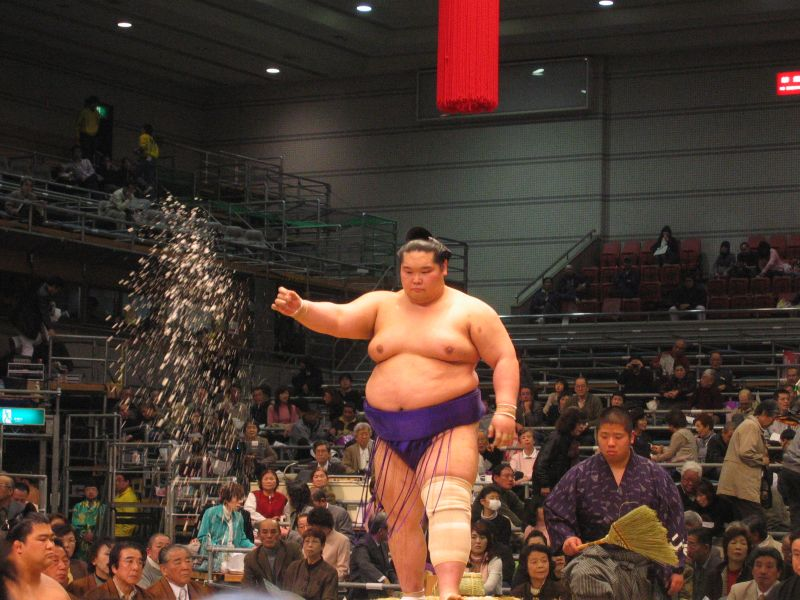
Ushiomaru in March 2005

He was one of the few high ranking sumo wrestlers from Shizuoka Prefecture, which has not supplied nearly as many new entrants as the colder northern parts of Japan such as Aomori and Hokkaidō. When he reached the top division in 2002 he was the first wrestler from Shizuoka Prefecture to do so since Katsunishiki, who spent just one tournament in makuuchi in January 1976. (He has since been followed by Katayama, Sagatsukasa and Midorifuji.)

== Retirement from sumo ==
In 2007, the head coach and founder of Azumazeki stable, former sekiwake Takamiyama, indicated that Ushiomaru would succeed him when he reached the mandatory retirement age of sixty-five in June 2009. This came as a surprise to some, who had assumed that his more high profile and higher ranked stablemate Takamisakari would take over. After completing his last match in the May 2009 tournament, Ushiomaru did announce his retirement from active sumo to take over head coach duties from the retiring Kuhaulua. He assumed the name Onogawa until June 16 when Kuhaulua officially retired and he became Azumazeki Oyakata. His danpatsu-shiki, or official retirement ceremony, was held at the Ryōgoku Kokugikan on January 31, 2010. Takamisakari remained an active wrestler until January 2013, when he announced his retirement. He then assisted Ushiomaru in running Azumazeki stable under the elder name of Furiwake. In February 2018 Azumazeki moved his stable to new premises in Shibamata District, Katsushika.

== Death ==
On December 13, 2019, he died of angiosarcoma in the Azumazeki stable in Shibamata, Tokyo, aged 41. A tsuya (wake) was held at Azumazeki stable on December 18 with Akebono, for whom Ushiomaru was a tsukebito, in attendance despite ill health. The funeral was held on December 19, with the former Azumazeki Oyakata (ex-Takamiyama) attending and the chair of the Sumo Association Hakkaku giving the memorial address. Takamisakari was confirmed as Ushiomaru's successor to the Azumazeki stable in January 2020.

== Family ==
Ushiomaru was married, and the couple's child, a daughter, was born in January 2018.

== Fighting style ==
Ushiomaru preferred oshi-sumo or pushing and thrusting techniques to fighting on the mawashi. His most common winning kimarite were oshi-dashi or push out, and yori-kiri or force out, which together accounted for nearly half his career victories.

== Career record ==
Ushiomaru Motoyasu
Year	January Hatsu basho, Tokyo	March Haru basho, Osaka	May Natsu basho, Tokyo	July Nagoya basho, Nagoya	September Aki basho, Tokyo	November Kyūshū basho, Fukuoka
1994	x	(Maezumo)	East Jonokuchi #17; 5–2	East Jonidan #166; 3–4	West Jonidan #192; 6–1	East Jonidan #90; 2–5
1995	East Jonidan #123; 4–3	West Jonidan #95; 4–3	East Jonidan #67; 4–3	West Jonidan #40; 2–5	West Jonidan #79; 5–2	West Jonidan #35; 5–2
1996	East Sandanme #91; 4–3	West Sandanme #74; 2–5	West Jonidan #7; 6–1	East Sandanme #51; 3–4	West Sandanme #66; 5–2	West Sandanme #34; 2–5
1997	West Sandanme #64; 4–3	East Sandanme #47; 4–3	West Sandanme #32; 4–3	West Sandanme #17; 5–2	East Makushita #53; 5–2	West Makushita #33; 4–3
1998	East Makushita #25; 3–4	West Makushita #35; 2–5	East Makushita #55; 4–3	West Makushita #46; 5–2	West Makushita #31; 1–6	East Makushita #55; 3–4
1999	East Sandanme #7; 6–1	West Makushita #36; 6–1	West Makushita #16; 4–3	East Makushita #11; 4–3	East Makushita #6; 2–5	West Makushita #17; 4–3
2000	East Makushita #13; 1–6	East Makushita #35; 6–1	East Makushita #16; 3–4	East Makushita #24; 4–3	East Makushita #18; 3–4	West Makushita #25; 6–1
2001	West Makushita #9; 2–5	West Makushita #22; 6–1	West Makushita #8; 4–3	West Makushita #5; 4–3	East Makushita #3; 4–3	West Makushita #1; 5–3
2002	East Jūryō #11; 11–4	East Jūryō #5; 6–8–1	West Jūryō #8; Sat out due to injury 0–0–15	West Jūryō #8; 13–2; Champion	East Maegashira #15; 9–6	West Maegashira #10; 3–7–5
2003	West Jūryō #4; Sat out due to injury 0–0–15	West Jūryō #4; 8–7	West Jūryō #2; 9–6	East Maegashira #14; 7–8	West Maegashira #15; 6–9	West Jūryō #4; 11–4
2004	East Maegashira #14; 7–8	West Maegashira #14; 7–8	East Maegashira #15; Sat out due to injury 0–0–15	West Jūryō #7; 7–8	East Jūryō #8; 6–9	West Jūryō #11; 5–10
2005	East Makushita #3; 5–2	East Jūryō #13; 5–10	East Makushita #4; 7–0; Champion	West Jūryō #9; 9–6	West Jūryō #4; 6–9	East Jūryō #7; 9–6
2006	West Jūryō #2; 9–6	East Maegashira #16; 4–11	East Jūryō #6; 8–7	East Jūryō #3; 8–7	West Jūryō #2; 9–6	East Maegashira #12; 5–10
2007	West Maegashira #15; 9–6	East Maegashira #12; 6–9	East Maegashira #15; 5–10	East Jūryō #2; 6–9	East Jūryō #4; 6–9	West Jūryō #7; 8–7
2008	East Jūryō #6; 5–10	West Jūryō #10; 8–7	East Jūryō #7; 7–8	West Jūryō #7; 6–9	West Jūryō #11; 7–8	East Jūryō #13; 8–7
2009	East Jūryō #12; 9–6	West Jūryō #5; 7–8	East Jūryō #7; Retired; 6–9	x	x	x
Record given as wins–losses–absences Top division champion Top division runner-up Retired Lower divisions Non-participation Sanshō key: F=Fighting spirit; O=Outstanding performance; T=Technique Also shown: ★=Kinboshi; P=Playoff(s); Divisions: Makuuchi — Jūryō — Makushita — Sandanme — Jonidan — Jonokuchi Makuuchi ranks: Yokozuna — Ōzeki — Sekiwake — Komusubi — Maegashira

== See also ==
- Glossary of sumo terms
- List of sumo tournament second division champions
- List of past sumo wrestlers
- List of sumo elders
