= Greatest Royal Rumble =

WWE pay-per-view and livestreaming event

- Promotional poster featuring various WWE wrestlers
- Promotion: WWE
- Brand(s): Raw; SmackDown; 205 Live
- Date: April 27, 2018
- City: Jeddah, Saudi Arabia
- Venue: King Abdullah International Stadium
- Attendance: 60,000

WWE event chronology
← Previous; WrestleMania 34	Next → Backlash

WWE in Saudi Arabia chronology
← Previous; First	Next → Crown Jewel

Greatest Royal Rumble was a 2018 professional wrestling pay-per-view (PPV) and livestreaming event produced by the American company WWE, held for wrestlers from the promotion's main roster brands, Raw, SmackDown, and 205 Live The event took place on Friday, April 27, 2018, at the King Abdullah International Stadium in Jeddah, Saudi Arabia. Similar to WWE's annual Royal Rumble event, the Greatest Royal Rumble event centered on the company's largest Royal Rumble match held, a 50-man match titled the Greatest Royal Rumble; a Royal Rumble match is a modified battle royal in which the participants enter a timed intervals instead of all beginning in the ring at the same time.

This was the first in a series of WWE events held in Saudi Arabia in a 10-year partnership in support of Saudi Vision 2030, the country's social and economic reform program. In addition to the Greatest Royal Rumble match, all of WWE's main roster men's championships at the time were defended. There were no women's matches on the card due to the limited rights women had in Saudi Arabia. WWE was criticized for holding the event without female wrestlers; however, these restrictions would lessen, as beginning with Crown Jewel in 2019, women's matches began to be included at the Saudi Arabian events. This was also WWE's first PPV and livestreaming event to be held on a Friday and the main card aired live at 7:00 p.m. Arabia Standard Time (12:00 p.m. Eastern Time).

The card comprised 10 matches. In the main event, Raw's Braun Strowman won the Greatest Royal Rumble match to win the WWE Greatest Royal Rumble Trophy and Championship. In the penultimate match, Brock Lesnar retained Raw's Universal Championship against Roman Reigns in a steel cage match. In other prominent matches, SmackDown's WWE Championship match between defending champion AJ Styles and Shinsuke Nakamura resulted in a double countout, The Undertaker defeated Rusev in a casket match, and in the opening bout, John Cena defeated Triple H. The Greatest Royal Rumble match was the final WWE match for Chris Jericho and Hornswoggle, the final match in the professional wrestling careers of The Great Khali and Mark Henry, and it was also Hiroki Sumi's only match in WWE.

== Production ==
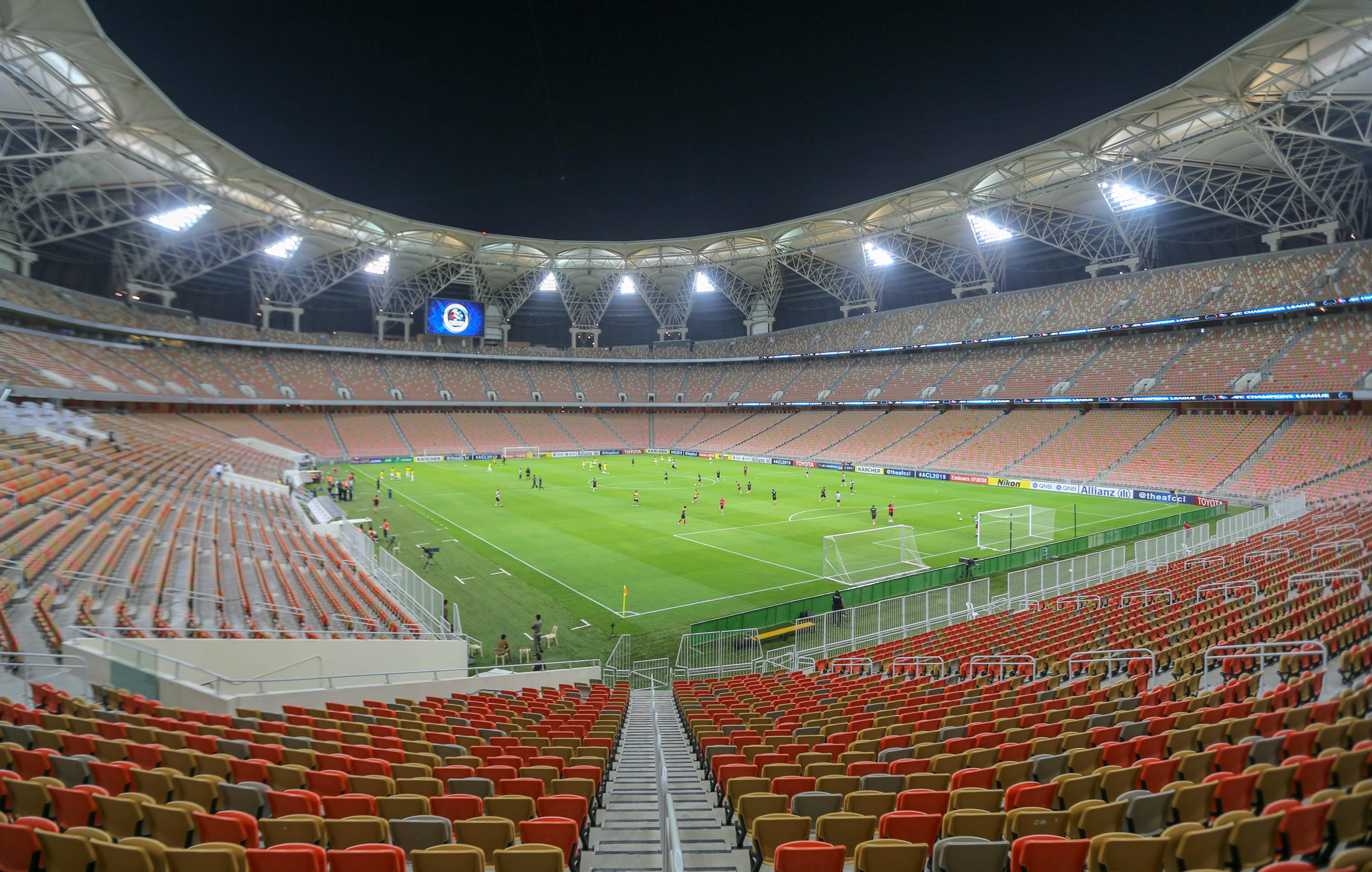
Greatest Royal Rumble was held at the King Abdullah International Stadium in Jeddah, Saudi Arabia. This was WWE's inaugural pay-per-view and livestreaming event to be held in the country as part of a 10-year partnership in support of Saudi Vision 2030.

=== Background ===
Since 1988, the American professional wrestling promotion WWE has held an annual event titled the Royal Rumble, which was originally a television special before becoming an annual pay-per-view (PPV) event in 1989 and then also available via livestreaming on the WWE Network since 2015. The event is centered on the Royal Rumble match, a modified battle royal in which the participants enter at timed intervals instead of all beginning in the ring at the same time, and the match generally features 30 wrestlers.

On March 5, 2018, WWE and the Saudi General Sports Authority advertised a live event titled the Greatest Royal Rumble to be held on Friday, April 27, 2018, at the King Abdullah International Stadium, part of the King Abdullah Sports City, in Jeddah, Saudi Arabia. The event was announced to feature the largest version of the Royal Rumble match, named the Greatest Royal Rumble match, having a total of 50 participants, ousting the 2011 Royal Rumble's 40-man match. The event was the first in a 10-year strategic multi-platform partnership between WWE and the Saudi General Sports Authority in support of Saudi Vision 2030, Saudi Arabia's social and economic reform program. It would also be WWE's first PPV and livestreaming event held on a Friday and the main card aired live at 7:00 p.m. Arabia Standard Time (12:00 p.m. Eastern Time).

On March 19, 2018, WWE scheduled matches for all seven of their main roster male championships across the Raw, SmackDown, and 205 Live brands at the time: Raw's Universal Championship, Intercontinental Championship, and Raw Tag Team Championship, SmackDown's WWE Championship, United States Championship, and SmackDown Tag Team Championship, and 205 Live's Cruiserweight Championship. The event was livestreamed on the WWE Network, as well as traditional pay-per-view in the United States and internationally. The event was also WWE's first PPV and livestreaming event with Arabic commentary.

In the weeks leading up to the event, WWE held tryouts in Saudi Arabia. From these tryouts, eight were selected to receive training by WWE, which would include an opportunity to earn a spot at the Greatest Royal Rumble event itself.

=== Storylines ===
The card comprised 10 matches that resulted from scripted storylines. Results were predetermined by WWE's writers on the Raw, SmackDown, and 205 Live brands, while storylines were produced on WWE's weekly television shows, Monday Night Raw, SmackDown Live, and the cruiserweight-exclusive 205 Live.

On April 9, Brock Lesnar, who had renewed his WWE contract, was scheduled to defend the Universal Championship against Roman Reigns in a steel cage match as a rematch from WrestleMania 34. On the Raw following WrestleMania, Reigns expressed frustration about not being told about his future matches and opponents, singling out the steel cage match with Lesnar. Reigns alleged that there was a conspiracy against him. Samoa Joe, who had been out with an injury since January, came out and warned Reigns that Lesnar would beat him again.

On March 26, WWE scheduled a ladder match between then-champion The Miz, Seth Rollins, Finn Bálor, and Samoa Joe for the Intercontinental Championship. At WrestleMania 34, The Miz lost the Intercontinental Championship to Rollins in a triple threat match that also included Bálor, thus making Rollins the defending champion. Both Miz and Joe were traded to SmackDown while Rollins and Bálor remained on Raw.

On March 26, Cesaro and Sheamus were scheduled to defend the Raw Tag Team Championship against The Hardy Boyz (Jeff Hardy and Matt Hardy). At WrestleMania 34, however, Cesaro and Sheamus lost the titles to Braun Strowman and 10-year-old Nicholas. The following night on Raw, Strowman and Nicholas relinquished the titles due to Nicholas being a fourth grader. Cesaro and Sheamus demanded their titles back, but Raw General Manager Kurt Angle instead scheduled them to face the winner of the four-team Tag Team Eliminator tournament for the vacant titles at the Greatest Royal Rumble. "Woken" Matt Hardy and Bray Wyatt won the tournament by defeating Titus Worldwide (Apollo Crews and Titus O'Neil) and The Revival (Dash Wilder and Scott Dawson). Cesaro and Sheamus were then traded to SmackDown during the Superstar Shake-up.

At WrestleMania 34, The Bludgeon Brothers (Harper and Rowan) defeated defending champions The Usos (Jey Uso and Jimmy Uso) and The New Day (Big E and Kofi Kingston) in a triple threat tag team match to win the SmackDown Tag Team Championship. On the following SmackDown, The Usos defeated The New Day to earn a title match at Greatest Royal Rumble.

A match between John Cena and Triple H was scheduled on March 26.

The Undertaker was originally scheduled to face Rusev in a casket match, the first match of its kind in three years. Due to reasons not entirely clear, Rusev was temporarily replaced by Chris Jericho—this was explained with Rusev's wife Lana complaining about her husband competing in a casket match—but eventually reinserted back into the match. Jericho was restored to his original participation in the Greatest Royal Rumble match.

At WrestleMania 34, Jinder Mahal won the United States Championship. Mahal was then traded to Raw and lost the championship to Jeff Hardy and Mahal invoked his rematch clause for the Greatest Royal Rumble. Hardy was then traded to SmackDown the following night.

At WrestleMania 34, AJ Styles successfully defended the WWE Championship against Shinsuke Nakamura. After the match, Nakamura showed his respect to Styles but then attacked him with a low blow and a Kinshasa, turning heel. On SmackDown on April 17, after repeated attacks on Styles by Nakamura, a rematch between the two was scheduled for the Greatest Royal Rumble.

On the WrestleMania 34 Kickoff pre-show, Cedric Alexander defeated Mustafa Ali in a tournament final to win the vacant WWE Cruiserweight Championship. Two nights later on 205 Live, Buddy Murphy attacked Alexander during his celebration. Murphy was then scheduled to face Alexander for the title at the Greatest Royal Rumble, but he failed his mandatory weigh-in when he weighed 207 pounds, 2 pounds over the 205 pound weight limit. He was then removed from the match and banned from competing on 205 Live until he met the weight requirement. The following week, Kalisto earned a Cruiserweight Championship match at the Greatest Royal Rumble by winning a gauntlet match.

== Event ==
Other on-screen personnel
Role:	Name:
English commentators	Michael Cole
English commentators	Corey Graves
English commentators	Byron Saxton
Spanish commentators	Carlos Cabrera
Spanish commentators	Marcelo Rodríguez
Arabic commentators	Faisal Almughaisib
Arabic commentators	Sultan Alharbi
Arabic commentators	Jude Aldajani
Ring announcer	Greg Hamilton
Referees	Danilo Anfibio
Referees	Jason Ayers
Referees	John Cone
Referees	Dan Engler
Referees	Darrick Moore
Referees	Chad Patton
Referees	Ryan Tran
Interviewer	Mike Rome
Pre-show panel	Byron Saxton
Pre-show panel	Jerry Lawler
Pre-show panel	Jim Ross
Pre-show panel	Booker T

=== Preliminary matches ===
The actual pay-per-view opened with John Cena facing Triple H. During the match, Cena performed an Attitude Adjustment on Triple H for a near-fall. Cena attempted another Attitude Adjustment but Triple H countered into a Pedigree for a near-fall. In the end, Cena performed a second Attitude Adjustment on Triple H, a catapult into the corner, and a third Attitude Adjustment to pick up the victory. Following the match, Cena thanked the Kingdom of Saudi Arabia for their hospitality, and expressed excitement over the event.

In the following match, Cedric Alexander defended the Cruiserweight Championship against Kalisto. The match ended when Alexander countered a Salida Del Sol attempt into a Lumbar Check to retain the title.

Next, the vacant Raw Tag Team Championship was contested between the team of Bray Wyatt and Matt Hardy and the former champions, Cesaro and Sheamus. In the end, Hardy distracted Sheamus, allowing Wyatt to perform a Sister Abigail on him. Hardy and Wyatt then performed a wheelbarrow Twist of Fate on Sheamus to win the titles.

Jeff Hardy then defended the United States Championship against Jinder Mahal. Hardy performed a Swanton Bomb on Mahal to retain the title.

After that, The Bludgeon Brothers defended the SmackDown Tag Team Championship against The Usos. Harper and Rowan retained the titles after performing The Reckoning on Jimmy Uso.

Next, Seth Rollins defended the Intercontinental Championship against Finn Balor, Samoa Joe and The Miz in a Ladder match. Near the end of the match, Balor attempted to retrieve the title, only for Rollins to springboard onto the ladder and retrieve the title belt, thus retaining the championship.

In a segment between matches, four prospects from the recent Saudi tryouts (including Mansoor) came out to the ring to introduce themselves. Cruiserweight Ariya Daivari and his brother Shawn Daivari, in his first WWE appearance since 2007, came out to interrupt them. The Saudi prospects attacked and cleared the Daivari brothers from the ring.

Later, AJ Styles defended the WWE Championship against Shinsuke Nakamura. During the match, Nakamura resorted to various illegal tactics, such as a low blow, increasingly frustrating Styles. In the end, both Nakamura and Styles fought outside of the ring, only for the match to end in a double countout. After the match, Styles performed a Phenomenal Forearm to the floor on Nakamura.

After that, The Undertaker fought Rusev (who was accompanied by Aiden English) in a Casket match. At the end of the match, Undertaker performed a chokeslam on Rusev and rolled him into the casket. Before Undertaker could close the casket, English attacked Undertaker, who retaliated with another chokeslam and a Tombstone Piledriver before putting English into the casket alongside Rusev and closing it for the victory.

In the penultimate match, Brock Lesnar (with Paul Heyman) defended the WWE Universal Championship against Roman Reigns in a Steel Cage match. As Reigns attempted a Superman Punch, Lesnar reversed it into four German Suplexes and an F-5. As Lesnar attempted a second F-5, Reigns reversed it into three Superman Punches. As Reigns attempted a Spear, Lesnar reversed it into a second F-5 attempt, but Reigns avoided it by climbing the cage. After both men failed to escape the cage, Reigns performed a Powerbomb on Lesnar from the top of a corner into the ring. After some crashes of Lesnar's body into some cage walls, Reigns performed three Spears for a nearfall. Heyman stopped Reigns from escaping the cage by slamming the door on him and Lesnar performed a second F-5 for a nearfall. Heyman threw a chair into the cage, but as Lesnar removed his MMA gloves and attempted to use it, Reigns performed a fourth Spear for a nearfall. Finally, Reigns performed a combo of four chair shots, a fourth Superman Punch and a fifth Spear on Lesnar through a cage wall. Although Reigns touched the floor with both feet first, the referee called for Lesnar to win the match as he technically escaped the cage first, retaining the WWE Universal Championship.

=== Main event ===
Daniel Bryan and Dolph Ziggler began the 50-man Royal Rumble match as the first two entrants. Titus O'Neil entered at No. 39 and tripped on his way to the ring. Bryan survived until the final three, beating Rey Mysterio for the longest time spent in a single Royal Rumble match of all time at an hour and sixteen minutes. In the end, Big Cass eliminated Bryan and attempted a big boot on Braun Strowman, who countered and eliminated Cass to win the match. Strowman also achieved the most eliminations of a single Royal Rumble match at 13, beating out a record previously held by Roman Reigns with 12. Post-match, Strowman received a trophy and the Greatest Royal Rumble Championship.

== Controversy ==
WWE was criticized for holding the event without female wrestlers, who were unable to perform at the event due to the limited rights women had in Saudi Arabia. Triple H, WWE's Executive Vice President of Talent, Live Events and Creative, responded to the criticism: "I understand that people are questioning it, but you have to understand that every culture is different and just because you don't agree with a certain aspect of it, it doesn't mean it's not a relevant culture...You can't dictate to a country or a religion about how they handle things but, having said that, WWE is at the forefront of a women's evolution in the world and what you can't do is effect change anywhere by staying away from it....While women are not competing in the event, we have had discussions about that and hope that, in the next few years they will be". Women were in attendance for the event, though only if accompanied by a male guardian. This was a major change from previous events, which were only open to men. Associated Press noted that this is due to "a series of social changes" by the Crown Prince Mohammad bin Salman. During the event, WWE aired a promotional video, which included WWE female wrestlers. The Saudi General Sports Authority issued an apology for "indecent material" that aired at the event.

In addition to the female wrestlers, male wrestler Sami Zayn did not participate at the event as Zayn is of Syrian descent, and Saudi Arabia had strained relations with Syria at the time. On the Raw after the event, a storyline excuse was given in where Sami was suffering from vertigo given to him by Bobby Lashley and therefore could not compete.

Another subject of criticism was the situation of LGBT rights in Saudi Arabia, as in Saudi Arabia, homosexual intercourse is illegal and can be punished by death.

Al-Qaeda in the Arabian Peninsula, a militant group offshoot of Al-Qaeda in Yemen, issued a warning to bin Salman and criticized WWE's event, stating that "Disbelieving wrestlers exposed their privates and on most of them was the sign of the cross, in front of a mixed gathering of young Muslim men and women. The corruptors did not stop at that, for every night musical concerts are being announced, as well as movies and circus shows".

== Results ==
No.	Results	Stipulations	Times
1	John Cena defeated Triple H by pinfall	Singles match	15:45
2	Cedric Alexander (c) defeated Kalisto by pinfall	Singles match for the WWE Cruiserweight Championship	10:15
3	Bray Wyatt and Matt Hardy defeated Cesaro and Sheamus by pinfall	Tag team match for the vacant WWE Raw Tag Team Championship	8:50
4	Jeff Hardy (c) defeated Jinder Mahal by pinfall	Singles match for the WWE United States Championship	6:10
5	The Bludgeon Brothers (Harper and Rowan) (c) defeated The Usos (Jey Uso and Jimmy Uso) by pinfall	Tag team match for the WWE SmackDown Tag Team Championship	5:05
6	Seth Rollins (c) defeated The Miz, Finn Bálor, and Samoa Joe by retrieving the championship	Ladder match for the WWE Intercontinental Championship	15:05
7	AJ Styles (c) vs. Shinsuke Nakamura ended in a double countout	Singles match for the WWE Championship	14:25
8	The Undertaker defeated Rusev (with Aiden English)	Casket match	9:40
9	Brock Lesnar (c) (with Paul Heyman) defeated Roman Reigns by escaping the cage	Steel Cage match for the WWE Universal Championship	9:15
10	Braun Strowman won by last eliminating Big Cass	50-man Royal Rumble match for the WWE Greatest Royal Rumble Trophy and Championship	1:17:20
(c) / – the champion(s) heading into the match

=== Tag Team Eliminator bracket ===
First Round; Raw; April 4, 2018
The Revival (Dash Wilder and Scott Dawson)	Pinfall
Karl Anderson and Luke Gallows	3:35
Bray Wyatt and Matt Hardy	Pinfall
Titus Worldwide (Apollo Crews and Titus O'Neil)	5:07

Final; Raw; April 16, 2018(4/16)
The Revival	5:25
Bray Wyatt and Matt Hardy	Pinfall
Championship Match; Greatest Royal Rumble; April 27, 2018
Cesaro and Sheamus	8:50
Bray Wyatt and Matt Hardy	Pinfall

=== Greatest Royal Rumble match entrances and eliminations ===
– Raw
– SmackDown
– 205 Live
– NXT
– Hall of Famer (HOF)
– Unbranded
– Winner

Draw	Entrant	Brand	Order eliminated	Eliminated by	Time	Elimination(s)
1	Daniel Bryan	SmackDown	48	Big Cass	1:16:05	3
2	Dolph Ziggler	Raw	12	Kurt Angle	21:44	3
3	Sin Cara	SmackDown	1	Dolph Ziggler	01:18	0
4	Curtis Axel	Raw	2	Mark Henry	02:00	0
5	Mark Henry	HOF	5	Daniel Bryan and Dolph Ziggler	03:27	3
6	Mike Kanellis	Raw	3	Mark Henry	00:03	0
7	Hiroki Sumi	Unbranded	4	Mark Henry	00:46	0
8	Viktor	Raw	6	Daniel Bryan	00:51	0
9	Kofi Kingston	SmackDown	14	Elias	16:34	1
10	Tony Nese	205 Live	9	Kofi Kingston and Xavier Woods	07:13	1
11	Dash Wilder	Raw	7	Daniel Bryan and Hornswoggle	01:26	0
12	Hornswoggle	Unbranded	8	Dolph Ziggler and Tony Nese	01:00	1
13	Primo	SmackDown	11	Kurt Angle	05:10	0
14	Xavier Woods	SmackDown	15	Elias	09:56	1
15	Bo Dallas	Raw	10	Kurt Angle	01:34	0
16	Kurt Angle	Raw/HOF	16	Elias	07:59	3
17	Scott Dawson	Raw	19	Bobby Roode	11:44	0
18	Goldust	Raw	18	Bobby Roode	10:04	0
19	Konnor	Raw	13	Elias	02:25	0
20	Elias	Raw	41	Bobby Lashley	34:04	5
21	Luke Gallows	SmackDown	20	Rey Mysterio	09:16	0
22	Rhyno	Raw	25	Roderick Strong	16:22	0
23	Drew Gulak	205 Live	17	Tucker Knight	01:47	0
24	Tucker Knight	NXT	23	Big E	10:08	1
25	Bobby Roode	Raw	29	Baron Corbin	17:44	2
26	Fandango	Raw	21	Mojo Rawley	03:42	0
27	Chad Gable	Raw	24	Apollo Crews	08:17	0
28	Rey Mysterio	Unbranded	37	Baron Corbin	20:25	1
29	Mojo Rawley	Raw	27	Randy Orton	08:52	2
30	Tyler Breeze	Raw	22	Mojo Rawley	00:16	0
31	Big E	SmackDown	33	Braun Strowman	13:59	1
32	Karl Anderson	SmackDown	26	Randy Orton	04:25	0
33	Apollo Crews	Raw	28	Randy Orton	03:26	1
34	Roderick Strong	NXT	30	Baron Corbin	06:00	1
35	Randy Orton	SmackDown	39	Elias	10:58	4
36	Heath Slater	Raw	34	Braun Strowman	07:38	0
37	Babatunde	NXT	31	Braun Strowman	05:53	0
38	Baron Corbin	Raw	38	Randy Orton	07:08	3
39	Titus O'Neil	Raw	35	Braun Strowman	04:42	0
40	Dan Matha	NXT	32	Braun Strowman	02:01	0
41	Braun Strowman	Raw	—	Winner	22:14	13
42	Tye Dillinger	SmackDown	36	Braun Strowman	00:29	0
43	Curt Hawkins	Raw	40	Braun Strowman	00:20	0
44	Bobby Lashley	Raw	45	Braun Strowman	14:38	2
45	The Great Khali	Unbranded	42	Braun Strowman and Bobby Lashley	00:31	0
46	Kevin Owens	Raw	47	Braun Strowman	10:43	0
47	Shane McMahon	SmackDown	44	Braun Strowman	08:07	0
48	Shelton Benjamin	SmackDown	43	Chris Jericho	04:23	0
49	Big Cass	SmackDown	49	Braun Strowman	07:23	1
50	Chris Jericho	SmackDown	46	Braun Strowman	03:18	1

- By eliminating 13 men, Braun Strowman broke the record of 12, set by Roman Reigns at the 2014 Royal Rumble.
- Daniel Bryan broke the overall Royal Rumble longevity record for lasting 1:16:05, previous record held by Rey Mysterio (lasting 1:02:12) at the 2006 Royal Rumble.
- Big Show and Kane were scheduled for the match but were pulled from the event due to injury.

=== Championship belt ===
At the conclusion of the Greatest Royal Rumble, Braun Strowman was awarded a trophy and a Greatest Royal Rumble Championship belt. According to The Sportster, "the likelihood is that nothing that took place in the main event will have any effect on anything once WWE arrives back in the United States and resume normal service". Although WWE.com had originally had a title history for the championship and listed Strowman as the reigning Greatest Royal Rumble Champion after the event, he never appeared with the belt at any other event and the title was never mentioned again.

The base design was similar to the WWE Championship belt introduced in 2014, with some differences. Instead of a large cut out of the WWE logo, the center plate was modeled with an Arabic pattern with the WWE logo in the center. Like the WWE Championship belt and other belts introduced since 2016, the Greatest Royal Rumble Championship belt contained two side plates, both separated by gold divider bars, with removable round sections that could be replaced with the current champion's logo; the default plates showed the official logo of Saudi General Sports Authority, which is identical to the Emblem of Saudi Arabia. The plates were on a green leather strap resembling the color of the Flag of Saudi Arabia.

== See also ==
- 2018 in professional wrestling
- Royal Rumble match
