= Takamisakari Seiken =

Japanese sumo wrestler (born 1976)

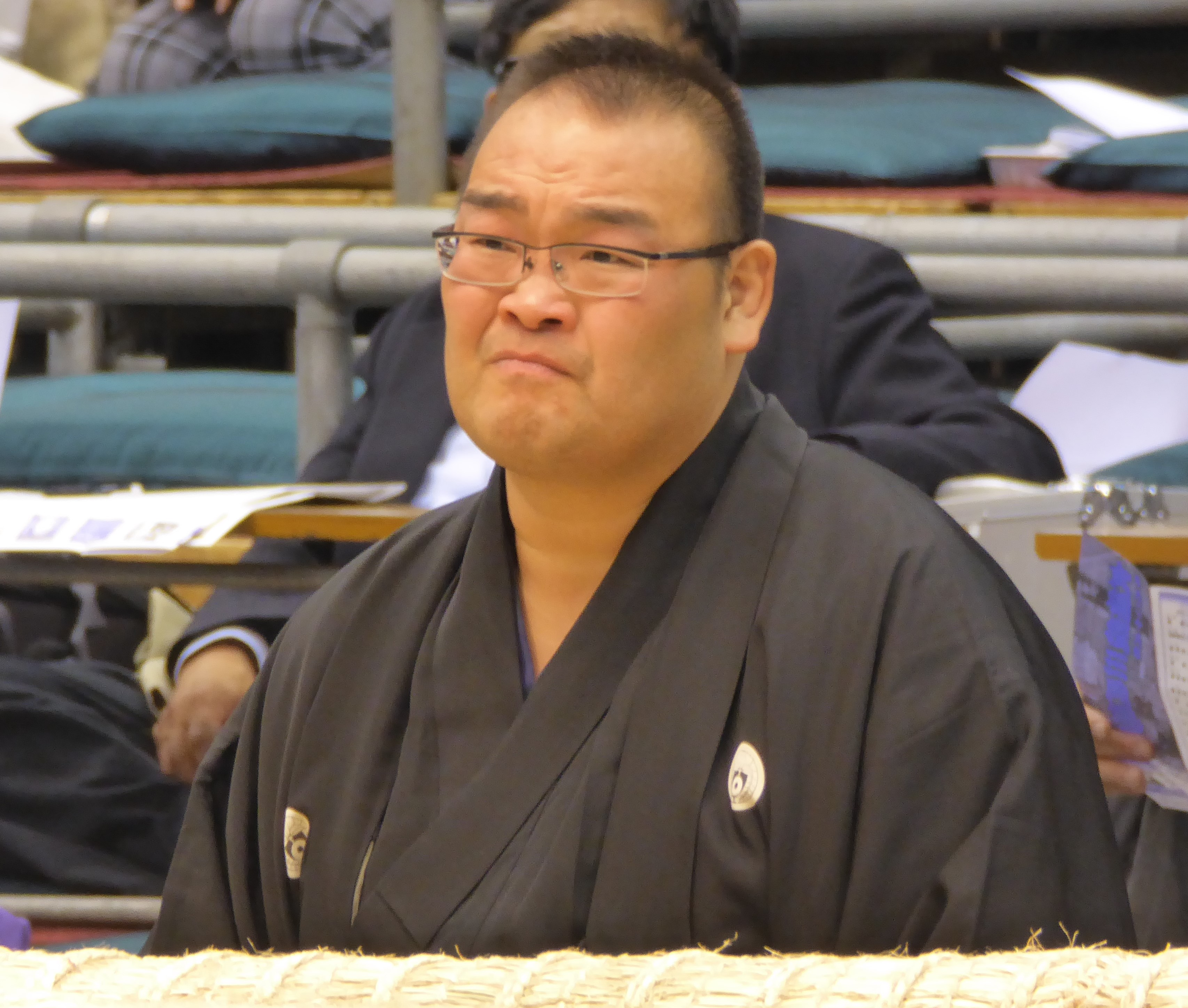

Personal information
- Native name: 高見盛 精彦
- Born: Seiken Katō; May 12, 1976 (age 50) Aomori, Japan
- Height: 1.88 m (6 ft 2 in)
- Weight: 140 kg (309 lb; 22 st 1 lb)

Sport
- Sport: Sumo
- University team: Nihon University
- Retired: January 2013
- Heya: Azumazeki
- Record: 563-564-46
- Debut: March 1999
- Highest rank: Komusubi (September 2002)
- Elder name: Azumazeki
- Championships: 1 (Jūryō)
- Special Prizes: Outstanding Performance (1); Fighting Spirit (2); Technique (2)
- Gold Stars: 2 (Asashōryū, Musashimaru)
- Updated on Jan 2013

Takamisakari Seiken (born May 12, 1976 as Seiken Katō) is a former sumo wrestler from Aomori Prefecture, Japan. A former amateur champion, he turned professional in 1999 and established himself in the top division in 2002 after a brief appearance in 2000. He received five special prizes for his achievements in tournaments and earned two gold stars for defeating yokozuna. The highest rank he reached was komusubi, which he held on two occasions. He was one of the most popular wrestlers in sumo in his time, largely due to his eccentric warm-ups before his matches. He retired in January 2013 to become a coach at Azumazeki stable, having taken the toshiyori-kabu Furiwake-oyakata. In January 2020 he became head coach of Azumazeki stable, following the death of the former Ushiomaru.

== Career ==
Born in Itayanagi, Kitatsugaru District, Katō was an amateur sumo champion at Nihon University, winning the College Yokozuna title in his final year. He began his professional sumo career as a makushita tsukedashi (a promising amateur allowed to start at a level significantly higher than entry level) in March 1999, wrestling under his own name. He reached jūryō, the second-highest division, in January 2000, at which point he changed his fighting name to Takamisakari.

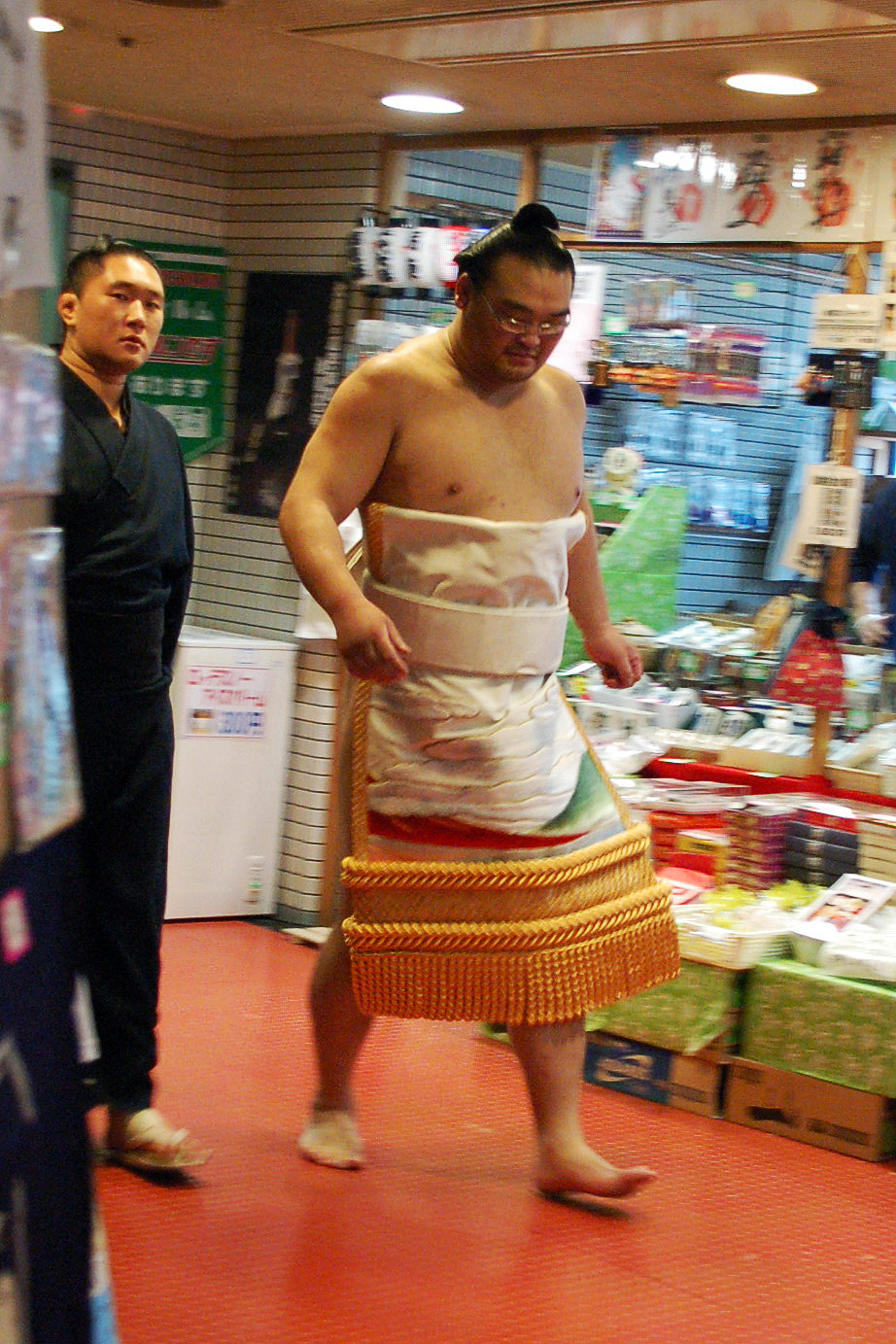
Takamisakari in his kesho-mawashi

Three tournaments later, in July of the same year, he was promoted to the top makuuchi division, becoming only the second wrestler (and first Japanese born) from his Azumazeki stable to achieve this feat. In September he acted as tsuyuharai ("dew-sweeper", an honorary attendant) in stablemate Yokozuna Akebono's ring-entering ceremony, but he was injured on the third day of that tournament. Enforced absence from the next two tournaments saw him demoted all the way back to the unsalaried makushita division, where he had begun his career. It took him until March 2002 to work his way back up to the makuuchi division, and in September he reached komusubi, his highest rank. He only held this rank for one tournament, however, dropping back to maegashira in November. He has earned five special prizes, and has two gold stars for defeating yokozuna, both earned in the July 2003 tournament where he was also awarded the Outstanding Performance prize. Although he again reached komusubi in November 2003, he again failed to retain the rank and spent the rest of his career in the top division as a middle-level maegashira.

Takamisakari again appeared in a yokozuna's ring-entered ceremony in September 2005, when he replaced Asasekiryū, who was injured, as sword-bearer. On the first day he accidentally scraped the sword against the ceiling.

He came close to demotion from the top division after missing five bouts through injury in November 2007. However, in the next tournament he achieved a majority of wins against losses from the maegashira 14 ranking. In May 2011 he could score only 7-8 at maegashira 15 but actually rose one place in the rankings for the following tournament due to the large number of wrestlers retiring over a match-fixing scandal. However his run of 56 consecutive makuuchi tournaments ended when he could only score 3-12 in the July 2011 basho.

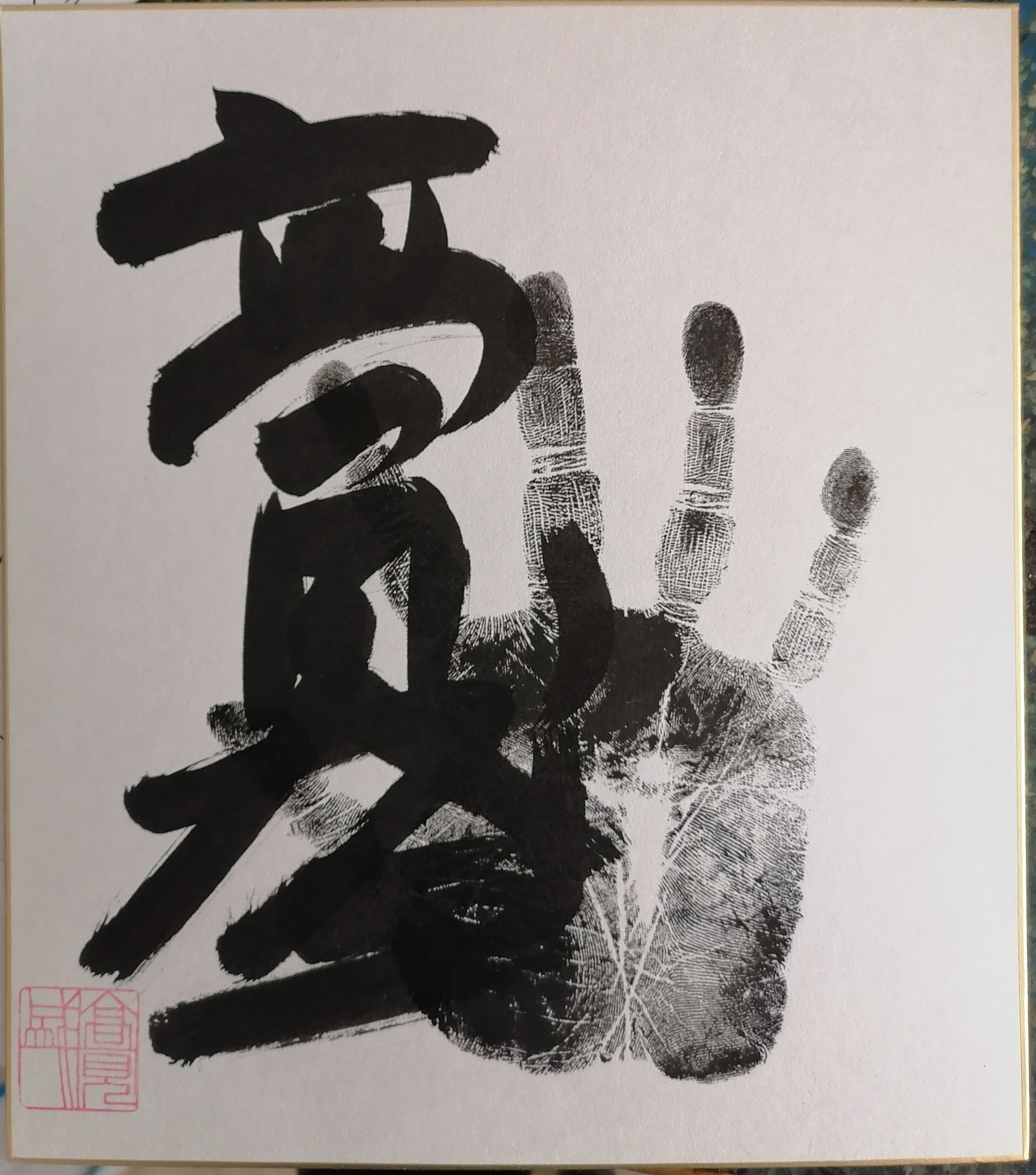
Original tegata (handprint and signature ) of sumo wrestler Takamisakari

Takamisakari was a hugely popular wrestler. He built himself up for each bout with a somewhat eccentric series of muscle flexes and slaps, and threw a copious amount of salt onto the dohyō. In a culture where impassivity is sometimes seen as a sign of strength, he made no attempt to hide his emotions, obviously elated after each win and inconsolably dejected after each loss. Even though he usually performed in the middle to lower ranks, the winner of his matches were always greatly rewarded with kenshō-kin (prize money) provided by his sponsor, a food company.

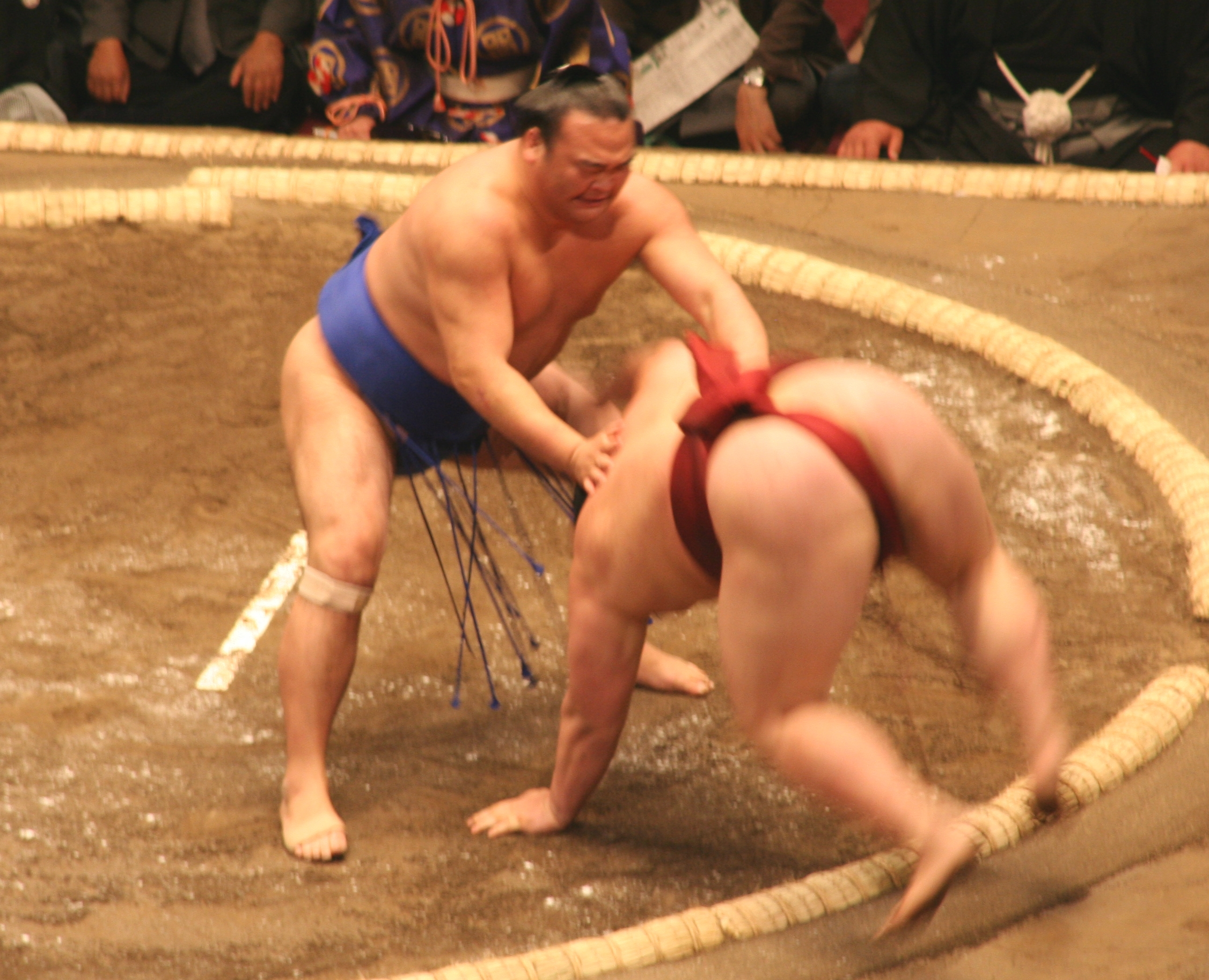
Takamisakari defeats Kasugaō during the May 2007 tournament.

== Retirement ==
Takamisakari announced his retirement on day 15 of the Hatsu basho, January 27, 2013, approximately one hour after defeating Wakakōyū, as his 5–10 record at the rank of jūryō 12 would have resulted in certain demotion to the makushita division. At his side were both his current stablemaster, the former Ushiomaru, and his previous stablemaster, the former Takamiyama. He told reporters, “I have been cheered by people around the nation. I am humbled, embarrassed and delighted at the same time.”

Takamisakari stayed in sumo as a coach at his stable under the elder name Furiwake-oyakata. The former Ushiomaru died suddenly in December 2019, and after the January 2020 tournament Takamisakari was confirmed as the new Azumazeki oyakata. However, he did not want the job permanently, and after failing to find a successor as head coach, Azumazeki stable closed shortly after the March 2021 tournament with the personnel moving to Hakkaku stable. Takamisakari also works as a ringside judge during tournaments.

== Fighting style ==
Takamisakari had a straightforward fighting style, rarely resorting to sidestepping at the initial charge. He favoured yotsu techniques, preferring a right-hand inside, left-hand outside grip on his opponent's mawashi (migi-yotsu), and 26 of his 41 wins between July 2007 and May 2008 were by yori-kiri, or a simple force out. He was also known for his effort and technique at the edge of the ring, which often allowed him to win matches in which just a moment earlier it appeared that he would be pushed out.

== In popular culture ==
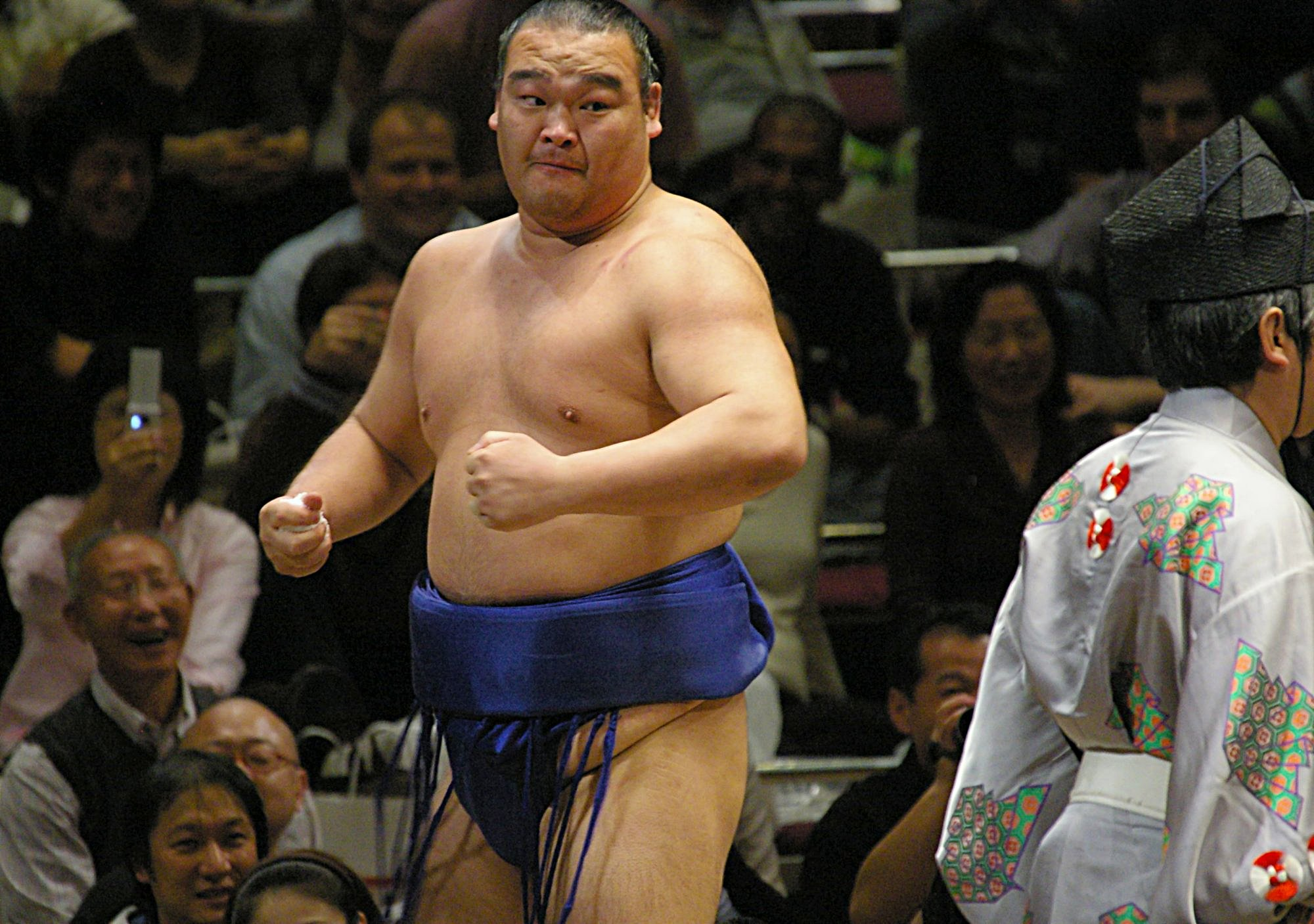

- He is known to some as "RoboCop". The nickname was given to him by former yokozuna Akebono, who was his senpai, in reference to his robot-like movements on the dohyō.
- He is a fan of the anime series Gundam Seed.
- He is also nearsighted, which explains why he squinted a lot on the dohyō. He wore glasses when outside of the ring.
- He appeared in the 2015 "No laughing batsu game" of Gaki No Tsukai where he did the lead role in a parody of Kinpachi Sensei as "Furiwake Sensei"

== Career record ==
Takamisakari Seiken
Year	January Hatsu basho, Tokyo	March Haru basho, Osaka	May Natsu basho, Tokyo	July Nagoya basho, Nagoya	September Aki basho, Tokyo	November Kyūshū basho, Fukuoka
1999	x	Makushita tsukedashi #60; 6–1	West Makushita #32; 6–1	West Makushita #13; 6–1	West Makushita #3; 4–3	West Makushita #2; 6–1
2000	East Jūryō #12; 7–8	East Jūryō #13; 11–4	West Jūryō #3; 11–4	East Maegashira #11; 10–5; F	West Maegashira #7; 1–3–11	East Jūryō #2; Sat out due to injury 0–0–15
2001	East Jūryō #2; Sat out due to injury 0–0–15	East Makushita #1; 2–5	West Makushita #10; 6–1	West Makushita #3; 4–3	East Makushita #2; 4–3	West Jūryō #12; 10–5
2002	West Jūryō #5; 12–3–P; Champion	East Maegashira #13; 9–6	West Maegashira #6; 8–7	East Maegashira #2; 9–6; T	East Komusubi #1; 4–11	East Maegashira #4; 5–10
2003	East Maegashira #9; 10–5	West Maegashira #2; 8–7; T	West Maegashira #1; 6–9	West Maegashira #3; 9–6; O★★	East Maegashira #1; 9–6; F	East Komusubi #1; 5–10
2004	East Maegashira #3; 4–11	East Maegashira #8; 8–7	West Maegashira #4; 6–9	West Maegashira #7; 8–7	East Maegashira #7; 7–8	West Maegashira #7; 8–7
2005	West Maegashira #5; 6–9	West Maegashira #8; 9–6	East Maegashira #7; 5–10	West Maegashira #11; 10–5	East Maegashira #5; 5–10	East Maegashira #9; 7–8
2006	East Maegashira #10; 7–8	West Maegashira #11; 7–8	East Maegashira #12; 8–7	West Maegashira #8; 7–8	East Maegashira #9; 7–8	East Maegashira #9; 10–5
2007	East Maegashira #5; 7–8	East Maegashira #6; 7–8	East Maegashira #7; 9–6	East Maegashira #4; 3–12	West Maegashira #9; 8–7	West Maegashira #8; 5–5–5
2008	East Maegashira #14; 8–7	West Maegashira #11; 10–5	East Maegashira #7; 7–8	East Maegashira #8; 6–9	West Maegashira #11; 6–9	East Maegashira #14; 10–5
2009	West Maegashira #5; 6–9	West Maegashira #7; 6–9	East Maegashira #12; 9–6	West Maegashira #4; 6–9	West Maegashira #7; 6–9	West Maegashira #11; 8–7
2010	East Maegashira #11; 7–8	West Maegashira #12; 7–8	West Maegashira #13; 8–7	West Maegashira #11; 9–6	East Maegashira #5; 4–11	East Maegashira #12; 8–7
2011	East Maegashira #9; 6–9	Tournament Cancelled; 0–0–0	East Maegashira #15; 7–8	East Maegashira #14; 3–12	West Jūryō #7; 6–9	West Jūryō #10; 9–6
2012	West Jūryō #6; 7–8	East Jūryō #8; 8–7	East Jūryō #6; 7–8	West Jūryō #6; 5–10	East Jūryō #8; 7–8	East Jūryō #9; 6–9
2013	East Jūryō #12; Retired; 5–10	x	x	x	x	x
Record given as wins–losses–absences Top division champion Top division runner-up Retired Lower divisions Non-participation Sanshō key: F=Fighting spirit; O=Outstanding performance; T=Technique Also shown: ★=Kinboshi; P=Playoff(s); Divisions: Makuuchi — Jūryō — Makushita — Sandanme — Jonidan — Jonokuchi Makuuchi ranks: Yokozuna — Ōzeki — Sekiwake — Komusubi — Maegashira

== See also ==
- Glossary of sumo terms
- List of sumo tournament second division champions
- List of past sumo wrestlers
- List of sumo elders
- List of komusubi
