= Fujizakura Yoshimori =

Sumo wrestler

Personal information
- Native name: 富士櫻栄守
- Born: Yoshio Nakazawa; 9 February 1948 (age 78) Kōfu, Yamanashi, Japan
- Height: 1.78 m (5 ft 10 in)
- Weight: 129 kg (284 lb; 20.3 st)

Sport
- Sport: Sumo
- Retired: March, 1985
- Heya: Takasago
- Record: 788-827-30
- Debut: March, 1963
- Highest rank: Sekiwake (March, 1974)
- Elder name: Nakamura
- Championships: 1 (Jūryō); 1 (Makushita)
- Special Prizes: Technique (3); Outstanding Performance (2); Fighting Spirit (3)
- Gold Stars: 9 Wajima (3); Wakanohana II (3); Kitanoumi (2); Kotozakura
- Updated on June 2020

Fujizakura Yoshimori (富士櫻栄守) (born 9 February 1948 as Yoshio Nakasawa) is a former sumo wrestler from Kōfu, Yamanashi, Japan. His highest rank was sekiwake. He wrestled for Takasago stable. He made his debut in 1963 and had one of the longest professional careers of any wrestler, fighting 1613 bouts in total, of which 1543 were consecutive. This latter record is second only to Aobajō. After his retirement in 1985 he was an elder of the Japan Sumo Association and the head coach of Nakamura stable.

== Career ==
He was the eldest son of a farmer, and was enrolled in the judo club at junior high school. He made his professional debut in March 1963. He was given the shikona of Fujizakura, meaning "cherry of Fuji", a reference to the prefectural flower of Yamanashi, a small pale red and white flower that blooms only around Mount Fuji. He reached sekitori status in January 1970 and was promoted to the top makuuchi division in September 1971. He was a runner-up in only his second honbasho or tournament in the division and was awarded the Fighting Spirit Prize. He fought in makuuchi for 73 tournaments in total, winning eight special prizes, and nine gold stars for defeating yokozuna. His highest rank was sekiwake, which he reached in March 1974.

He was demoted to the jūryō division on two occasions in 1979 and 1980, but each time made an immediate comeback to makuuchi. His final top division tournament was in January 1984, where he had to withdraw through injury – coincidentally, his long-time stablemate Takamiyama withdrew from the same tournament and this was also his final makuuchi appearance. This brought to an end Fujizakura's run of 1543 consecutive appearances from his professional debut, which was the most in sumo history at the time. As of 2017 it is second only to Aobajō's 1630 consecutive bouts. In September 2023, his record was tied by Tamawashi.

He was a favourite of Emperor Shōwa, a noted fan of sumo. His May 1975 bout with Kirinji in which he thrust at his opponent over 50 times but lost, was named one of the "Best 10 All Time Battles in Ozumo" by the Nikkei newspaper.

== Retirement from sumo ==
Fujizakura retired in March 1985, after facing demotion to the makushita division. He became an elder of the Japan Sumo Association, opening up Nakamura stable in 1986, taking four jonokuchi ranked wrestlers from Takasago stable. He had a policy of not accepting foreign-born wrestlers or makushita tsukedashi entrants with a college sumo background, and encouraged his wrestlers to obtain high school diplomas by correspondence courses over the internet. He produced a handful of jūryō ranked wrestlers but none reached the top division. He also served as a judge of tournament bouts for over 20 years, and held the post of deputy director of Judging. Nakamura stable closed at the end of 2012, and he retired from the Sumo Association upon turning 65 in February 2013.

== Fighting style ==
Fujizakura was a pusher-thruster who preferred oshi-sumo techniques to fighting on the mawashi or belt (yotsu-sumo). His speciality was tsuppari, a series of rapid thrusts to the opponent's chest. He was small by sumo standards, but was such an enthusiastic trainer in his younger days that he even had to be warned by his stablemaster at the time, former yokozuna Maedayama, not to over-train.

== Personal life ==
His eldest son Shinwa Nakasawa, born in 1976, is a folk singer.

== Career record ==
Fujizakura Yoshimori
Year	January Hatsu basho, Tokyo	March Haru basho, Osaka	May Natsu basho, Tokyo	July Nagoya basho, Nagoya	September Aki basho, Tokyo	November Kyūshū basho, Fukuoka
1963	x	(Maezumo)	East Jonokuchi #25; 4–3	West Jonidan #61; 3–4	East Jonidan #73; 2–5	East Jonidan #87; 4–3
1964	East Jonidan #60; 4–3	East Jonidan #39; 2–5	East Jonidan #56; 3–4	East Jonidan #60; 5–2	East Jonidan #18; 5–2	West Sandanme #75; 4–3
1965	West Sandanme #56; 3–4	West Sandanme #66; 2–5	East Sandanme #89; 3–4	West Jonidan #1; 4–3	West Sandanme #83; 1–6	East Jonidan #13; 5–2
1966	West Sandanme #73; 5–2	East Sandanme #45; 5–2	West Sandanme #16; 3–4	East Sandanme #22; 5–2	West Makushita #83; 5–2	West Makushita #58; 3–4
1967	East Makushita #69; 4–3	West Makushita #58; 3–4	West Sandanme #11; 4–3	East Makushita #59; 3–4	West Sandanme #7; 2–5	East Sandanme #22; 3–4
1968	West Sandanme #28; 6–1	West Makushita #54; 6–1	East Makushita #28; 6–1	East Makushita #11; 3–4	East Makushita #17; 3–4	West Makushita #22; 3–4
1969	West Makushita #27; 7–0; Champion	East Makushita #1; 1–6	West Makushita #15; 4–3	East Makushita #12; 5–2	East Makushita #3; 3–4	West Makushita #5; 5–2
1970	West Jūryō #13; 9–6	West Jūryō #6; 5–10	East Jūryō #13; 10–5	West Jūryō #5; 6–9	East Jūryō #11; 9–6	West Jūryō #7; 6–9
1971	West Jūryō #11; 10–5	East Jūryō #4; 8–7	East Jūryō #3; 9–6	West Jūryō #2; 10–5	East Maegashira #12; 9–6	West Maegashira #6; 11–4; F
1972	East Maegashira #1; 7–8	West Maegashira #2; 6–9	West Maegashira #5; 9–6	West Maegashira #1; 9–6	East Komusubi #2; 4–11	West Maegashira #5; 5–10
1973	West Maegashira #9; 6–9	East Maegashira #12; 6–9	West Maegashira #8; 8–7	West Maegashira #4; 7–8	East Maegashira #5; 8–7 ★	West Maegashira #2; 10–5; T
1974	East Komusubi #1; 9–6; T	West Sekiwake #1; 2–13	East Maegashira #8; 8–7	West Maegashira #3; 5–10	East Maegashira #8; 8–7	West Maegashira #6; 6–9
1975	East Maegashira #10; 10–5	East Maegashira #3; 8–7	West Maegashira #1; 7–8	East Maegashira #2; 10–5	West Komusubi #1; 7–8	West Maegashira #1; 9–6
1976	East Komusubi #2; 3–12	East Maegashira #7; 8–7	East Maegashira #2; 7–8 ★	East Maegashira #3; 7–8	West Maegashira #3; 8–7 ★	West Komusubi #1; 6–9
1977	West Maegashira #2; 5–10	West Maegashira #7; 8–7	East Maegashira #4; 9–6	West Komusubi #1; 5–10	West Maegashira #4; 7–8	West Maegashira #4; 9–6
1978	East Maegashira #1; 6–9	East Maegashira #4; 8–7; O	West Maegashira #1; 7–8	West Maegashira #2; 9–6; O★	West Sekiwake #1; 5–10	East Maegashira #3; 7–8
1979	West Maegashira #4; 10–5; T★	West Komusubi #1; 6–9	East Maegashira #2; 3–12	East Maegashira #12; 5–10	West Jūryō #2; 10–5–PP	West Maegashira #11; 9–6
1980	West Maegashira #3; 7–8 ★★	West Maegashira #3; 3–12 ★	East Maegashira #11; 7–8	West Maegashira #11; 5–10	East Jūryō #3; 12–3–P; Champion	East Maegashira #10; 8–7
1981	West Maegashira #6; 10–5; F★	West Komusubi #1; 3–12	West Maegashira #4; 5–10	West Maegashira #9; 7–8	West Maegashira #10; 7–8	West Maegashira #10; 9–6
1982	West Maegashira #4; 3–12	West Maegashira #7; 7–8	East Maegashira #9; 10–5	West Maegashira #1; 7–8	West Maegashira #1; 4–11	East Maegashira #6; 7–8
1983	West Maegashira #6; 4–11	East Maegashira #11; 7–8	East Maegashira #12; 8–7	East Maegashira #6; 6–9	East Maegashira #10; 10–5; F	East Maegashira #1; 4–11
1984	West Maegashira #10; 0–4–11	West Jūryō #5; Sat out due to injury 0–0–15	West Jūryō #5; 8–7	East Jūryō #2; 6–9	East Jūryō #6; 10–5	West Jūryō #3; 4–7–4
1985	West Jūryō #9; Sat out due to injury 0–0–15	West Jūryō #9; Retired; 3–12	x	x	x	x
Record given as wins–losses–absences Top division champion Top division runner-up Retired Lower divisions Non-participation Sanshō key: F=Fighting spirit; O=Outstanding performance; T=Technique Also shown: ★=Kinboshi; P=Playoff(s); Divisions: Makuuchi — Jūryō — Makushita — Sandanme — Jonidan — Jonokuchi Makuuchi ranks: Yokozuna — Ōzeki — Sekiwake — Komusubi — Maegashira

== See also ==
- List of sumo record holders
- Glossary of sumo terms
- List of sumo tournament top division runners-up
- List of sumo tournament second division champions
- List of past sumo wrestlers
- List of sekiwake
