= Takamiyama Daigorō =

American sumo wrestler

Personal information
- Native name: 髙見山 大五郎
- Born: Jesse James Wailani Kuhaulua; June 16, 1944 (age 82) Maui, Territory of Hawaii
- Height: 1.90 m (6 ft 3 in)
- Weight: 204 kg (450 lb; 32.1 st)

Sport
- Sport: Sumo
- Retired: May 1984
- Heya: Takasago
- Record: 812–845–22
- Debut: March 1964
- Highest rank: Sekiwake (September 1972)
- Elder name: Azumazeki
- Championships: 1 (Makuuchi); 1 (Jonidan); 1 (Jonokuchi)
- Special Prizes: Outstanding Performance (6); Fighting Spirit (5)
- Gold Stars: 12; Wajima (7); Sadanoyama; Kashiwado; Kitanofuji; Kotozakura; Kitanoumi
- Updated on June 2020

Takamiyama Daigorō (髙見山 大五郎; born 16 June 1944 as Jesse James Wailani Kuhaulua) is an American-born Japanese former professional sumo wrestler. Wrestling for Takasago stable for twenty years from 1964 to 1984, his highest rank was sekiwake. Takamiyama set a number of longevity records in sumo, including most tournaments ranked in the top makuuchi division, and most consecutive top division appearances. In July 1972, he became the first foreign-born wrestler to win the top division championship. He is also the first foreign-born wrestler ever to take charge of a training stable, founding Azumazeki stable in 1986. His most successful wrestler was fellow Hawaiian Akebono who reached the sport's highest rank of yokozuna in 1993. Takamiyama retired as a coach in 2009.

== Early life ==
Kuhaulua was born in Happy Valley, Maui to parents who were mostly of Hawaiian descent. Due to his impressive height and weight of 6 foot 2 inches (189 cm) and 280 pounds (127 kg), he was recruited as a tackle for the Henry Perrine Baldwin High School football team. His football coach noticed that he had weak legs and hips, and recommended that he train his lower body through sumo, a sport popular among the local Japanese-American community. He joined a local amateur sumo club and it was there that he was spotted by visiting professional sumo wrestlers from Japan. He was eventually recruited by the head coach of Takasago stable, former yokozuna Maedayama. After graduating from Baldwin High School in Wailuku in 1963 he left for Tokyo on February 22, 1964, to join Takasago stable as a new recruit.

== Sumo career ==
Takamiyama made his professional debut in March 1964. He was quickly given one of Takasago's prestigious shikona, or ring name, Takamiyama Daigorō (髙見山 大五郎) to evoke the founder of the stable, Takasago Uragorō. He achieved sekitori status in March 1967 when he won promotion to the second highest jūryō division. He reached the top makuuchi division five tournaments later. He had an exceptionally long top division career that spanned from January 1968 to January 1984. For many years he held the record for having competed in the most tournaments as a top division wrestler, at 97 (these were also consecutive tournaments). In November 2009 this record was broken by the veteran ōzeki Kaiō, and Kaiō has also surpassed his long-standing record of 1430 top division bouts. However, Takamiyama still holds the record for the most consecutive bouts in the top division (1231), as he did not miss a match from his debut until he was forced to withdraw from the September 1981 tournament because of a training injury.

He won a total of twelve kinboshi (gold stars awarded for maegashira wins against a yokozuna), a record which stood until Akinoshima surpassed it in the 1990s. His first kinboshi came in only his second top division tournament against Sadanoyama, who had won the previous two tournaments but suddenly retired just two days after losing to him. His final gold star came ten years later at the age of 35, against Kitanoumi in September 1978 – only the fourth time the yokozuna had been beaten that year. Takamiyama also won eleven special prizes, or sanshō for his performances in tournaments.

The highlight of his career came in July 1972 when he won the tournament championship with a 13–2 record – the first foreigner ever to do so. Ranked at maegashira 4, he lost only to Kotozakura and Takanohana and defeated Asahikuni on the final day to finish one win ahead of Takanohana. A congratulatory letter from US President Richard Nixon was read out by the US Ambassador to Japan at the presentation ceremony, marking the first time English had been officially spoken on the dohyō.

Following this victory he was promoted to sumo's third highest rank of sekiwake. He was to hold this rank a further seven times, but he was ultimately unable to score ten wins or more in consecutive tournaments and so was never able to reach the rank of ōzeki. Nevertheless, he paved the way for other Hawaii wrestlers such as Konishiki and Akebono. His final appearance in the san'yaku ranks was at komusubi in September 1982 at age 38, making him the second oldest postwar san'yaku wrestler after former ōzeki Nayoroiwa.

Takamiyama weighed over 200 kg (440 lb) at his peak and was associated with his sideburns and bright orange mawashi. He appeared in several television commercials before the practice was banned by the Sumo Association. During his career, he was known for competing through injuries and for maintaining a long consecutive-bout record.

== Retirement from sumo ==
Takamiyama's goal had always been to fight until the age of forty, but a serious elbow injury sustained in November 1983 caused him to fall to jūryō, and in May 1984, facing certain demotion to the third makushita division, he announced his retirement after twenty years in sumo. He was just a few weeks short of his fortieth birthday. He became a member of the Japan Sumo Association, with the name Azumazeki. To do so he had taken Japanese citizenship in 1980 and adopted the Japanese name Daigoro Watanabe (渡辺 大五郎), his wife's family name.

Takamiyama had been responsible for recruiting fellow Hawaiian Konishiki to Takasago stable in July 1982, while he was still an active wrestler. He subsequently opened his own training stable, Azumazeki-beya, in February 1986, the first foreign-born former wrestler to do so. Another Hawaiian, Akebono, became the stable's first sekitori in 1990, and became the first foreign-born yokozuna in 1993. One of Azumazeki's stated goals after this was to coach a Japanese wrestler to the top division, and this was achieved in July 2000 when the popular Takamisakari made his makuuchi debut. He was later joined by Ushiomaru, who in 2009 took over the running of the stable when Azumazeki reached the Sumo Association's mandatory retirement age of sixty-five.

His farewell party at a local hotel in Tokyo on 6 June 2009 attracted 1000 guests, including Akebono and Konishiki. A congratulatory letter from US President Barack Obama was read out.

== Fighting style ==
Takamiyama's technique was somewhat rudimentary (his eleven sanshō awards did not include a Technique Prize). He tended to rely on his strength and momentum rather than work on the opponent's mawashi with throwing moves. His two most common winning techniques were yorikiri (force out) and oshidashi (push out). Being exceptionally strong he regularly won by kimedashi (armlock force out) and tsuridashi (lift out). His balance was suspect, as his long legs meant he was rather top-heavy with his centre of gravity too high. As a result, he was often prone to being thrown by lighter, more agile opponents. At a peak weight of 204 kilograms (450 lb) he was the heaviest sumo wrestler of his time. Two lightweights who he often had trouble with were Asahikuni and Washuyama.

== Career record ==
Takamiyama Daigorō
Year	January Hatsu basho, Tokyo	March Haru basho, Osaka	May Natsu basho, Tokyo	July Nagoya basho, Nagoya	September Aki basho, Tokyo	November Kyūshū basho, Fukuoka
1964	x	(Maezumo)	West Jonokuchi #11; 6–1–PP; Champion	East Jonidan #71; 7–0–P; Champion	West Sandanme #22; 5–2	West Makushita #92; 5–2
1965	West Makushita #66; 2–5	West Makushita #84; 6–1	West Makushita #44; 3–4	East Makushita #48; 5–2	West Makushita #30; 5–2	East Makushita #14; 3–4
1966	East Makushita #17; 1–6	East Makushita #41; 3–4	West Makushita #46; 5–2	West Makushita #29; 5–2	East Makushita #16; 5–2	West Makushita #9; 5–2
1967	West Makushita #2; 5–2	East Jūryō #18; 10–5	East Jūryō #13; 10–5	East Jūryō #6; 9–6	East Jūryō #2; 8–7	East Jūryō #1; 10–5
1968	East Maegashira #9; 9–6; F	East Maegashira #4; 5–10 ★	East Maegashira #6; 8–7	West Maegashira #2; 7–8	West Maegashira #3; 8–7; F★	West Maegashira #1; 4–11
1969	West Maegashira #6; 6–9	West Maegashira #8; 9–6	West Maegashira #3; 7–8	West Maegashira #3; 6–9	East Maegashira #5; 9–6	West Komusubi #1; 8–7
1970	West Komusubi #1; 8–7	East Komusubi #1; 4–11	West Maegashira #5; 11–4	East Komusubi #1; 5–10	West Maegashira #3; 6–9	East Maegashira #5; 8–7
1971	West Komusubi #1; 4–11	East Maegashira #3; 6–9	West Maegashira #3; 9–6	West Komusubi #1; 8–7	East Komusubi #1; 8–7	East Komusubi #1; 8–7
1972	East Komusubi #2; 6–9	East Maegashira #3; 6–9	East Maegashira #7; 8–7	West Maegashira #4; 13–2; O	West Sekiwake #2; 5–10	West Maegashira #1; 9–6; O★
1973	West Sekiwake #1; 8–7	West Sekiwake #1; 4–11	West Maegashira #4; 8–7	West Komusubi #1; 3–12	West Maegashira #4; 9–6	East Maegashira #1; 5–10
1974	West Maegashira #4; 8–7	West Maegashira #1; 10–5; O★★	West Sekiwake #1; 8–7	West Sekiwake #1; 11–4; FO	East Sekiwake #1; 6–9	East Maegashira #1; 7–8 ★
1975	East Maegashira #2; 6–9 ★	East Maegashira #5; 8–7	East Maegashira #3; 10–5	West Komusubi #1; 5–10	West Maegashira #4; 11–4 ★	East Komusubi #1; 8–7
1976	East Komusubi #1; 9–6; O	East Sekiwake #1; 7–8	West Komusubi #2; 8–7	East Komusubi #1; 5–10	East Maegashira #4; 8–7 ★	East Maegashira #1; 8–7
1977	East Komusubi #2; 5–10	East Maegashira #3; 6–9 ★	East Maegashira #7; 9–6	West Maegashira #2; 9–6	East Komusubi #1; 9–6; O	East Sekiwake #2; 3–12
1978	East Maegashira #6; 9–6	West Maegashira #1; 6–9	West Maegashira #3; 6–9 ★	West Maegashira #6; 10–5	East Maegashira #1; 5–10 ★	East Maegashira #6; 9–6
1979	West Komusubi #1; 2–13	East Maegashira #9; 8–7	East Maegashira #5; 8–7	East Maegashira #1; 3–12	West Maegashira #10; 10–5	West Maegashira #2; 3–12
1980	West Maegashira #11; 8–7	West Maegashira #6; 8–7	East Maegashira #3; 6–9	West Maegashira #4; 7–8	West Maegashira #5; 7–8	East Maegashira #6; 6–9
1981	East Maegashira #11; 8–7	East Maegashira #7; 9–6; F	East Maegashira #3; 6–9	West Maegashira #7; 10–5; F	East Maegashira #1; 0–2–13	East Maegashira #11; 9–6
1982	East Maegashira #5; 8–7	East Maegashira #2; 5–10	East Maegashira #8; 10–5	East Maegashira #1; 8–7	East Komusubi #1; 5–10	East Maegashira #4; 4–11
1983	East Maegashira #9; 9–6	East Maegashira #2; 4–11	West Maegashira #7; 8–7	East Maegashira #2; 5–10	West Maegashira #7; 6–9	East Maegashira #11; 8–5–2
1984	East Maegashira #8; 1–7–7	West Jūryō #3; 4–11	West Jūryō #12; Retired; 2–13	x	x	x
Record given as wins–losses–absences Top division champion Top division runner-up Retired Lower divisions Non-participation Sanshō key: F=Fighting spirit; O=Outstanding performance; T=Technique Also shown: ★=Kinboshi; P=Playoff(s); Divisions: Makuuchi — Jūryō — Makushita — Sandanme — Jonidan — Jonokuchi Makuuchi ranks: Yokozuna — Ōzeki — Sekiwake — Komusubi — Maegashira

== See also ==
- List of sumo record holders
- List of sumo tournament top division champions
- Glossary of sumo terms
- List of past sumo wrestlers
- List of sekiwake
- Fred Kuhaulua - Cousin of Takamiyama
