= Tokitsukaze =

Tokitsukaze may refer to:

- Japanese destroyer Tokitsukaze
- Tokitsukaze stable, a stable of sumo wrestlers
  - Yutakayama Katsuo (born 1937), former head of the stable 1969–2002
  - Futatsuryū Jun'ichi (1950–2014), former head of the stable 2002–2007
  - Tokitsuumi Masahiro (born 1973), former head of the stable 2007-2021
  - Tosayutaka Yūya (born 1985) present Tokitsukaze-oyakata and current head of the stable
- Tokitsukaze (horse), a Japanese Thoroughbred racehorse
