= 2007 in sumo =

The following are the events in professional sumo during 2007.

== Tournaments ==
=== Hatsu basho ===
Ryogoku Kokugikan, Tokyo, 7 January – 21 January

2007 Hatsu basho results - Makuuchi Division
W		L		A	East			Rank	West			W		L		A
14	-	1	-	0		(Mongolia)	**Asashōryū**	Y	ø							
9	-	6	-	0		(Bulgaria)	**Kotoōshū**	O		(Japan)	Tochiazuma	5	-	10	-	0
8	-	7	-	0		(Japan)	**Kaiō**	O		(Japan)	**Chiyotaikai**	10	-	5	-	0
					ø			O		(Mongolia)	**Hakuhō**	10	-	5	-	0
8	-	7	-	0		(Japan)	**Kotomitsuki**	S		(Japan)	Miyabiyama	5	-	10	-	0
7	-	8	-	0		(Japan)	Kisenosato	K		(Russia)	Rohō	3	-	12	-	0
9	-	6	-	0		(Japan)	**Kotoshōgiku**	M1		(Japan)	Dejima	4	-	11	-	0
8	-	7	-	0		(Mongolia)	**Tokitenkū**	M2		(Japan)	Aminishiki	4	-	11	-	0
8	-	7	-	0		(Mongolia)	**Kyokutenhō**	M3	ø	(Estonia)	Baruto	2	-	2	-	11
10	-	5	-	0		(Mongolia)	**Ama**	M4		(Japan)	Hōmashō	7	-	8	-	0
7	-	8	-	0		(Japan)	Takamisakari	M5		(Georgia (country))	Kokkai	7	-	8	-	0
10	-	5	-	0		(Mongolia)	**Asasekiryū**	M6		(Japan)	Tochinonada	6	-	9	-	0
8	-	7	-	0		(South Korea)	**Kasugaō**	M7		(Japan)	**Futen'ō**	8	-	7	-	0
6	-	9	-	0		(Mongolia)	Kakuryū	M8		(Japan)	**Takekaze**	8	-	7	-	0
8	-	7	-	0		(Japan)	**Kakizoe**	M9		(Japan)	**Toyonoshima**	12	-	3	-	0
7	-	8	-	0		(Japan)	Iwakiyama	M10		(Japan)	Jūmonji	4	-	11	-	0
9	-	6	-	0		(Japan)	**Tamakasuga**	M11		(Japan)	Tochinohana	5	-	10	-	0
3	-	12	-	0		(Japan)	Toyozakura	M12		(Japan)	**Tokitsuumi**	8	-	7	-	0
9	-	6	-	0		(Japan)	**Kasuganishiki**	M13		(Japan)	**Yoshikaze**	8	-	7	-	0
10	-	5	-	0		(Japan)	**Tamanoshima**	M14		(Russia)	**Hakurozan**	8	-	7	-	0
4	-	11	-	0		(Japan)	Asōfuji	M15		(Japan)	**Ushiomaru**	9	-	6	-	0
11	-	4	-	0		(Japan)	**Tosanoumi**	M16		(Japan)	Ōtsukasa	7	-	8	-	0

ø - Indicates a pull-out or absent rank
**winning record in bold**
**Yusho Winner**

=== Haru basho ===
Osaka Prefectural Gymnasium, Osaka, 11 March – 25 March

2007 Haru basho results - Makuuchi Division
W		L		A	East			Rank	West			W		L		A
13	-	2	-	0		(Mongolia)	**Asashōryū**	Y	ø							
7	-	8	-	0		(Japan)	Chiyotaikai	O		(Mongolia)	**Hakuhō***	13	-	2	-	0
8	-	7	-	0		(Bulgaria)	**Kotoōshū**	O		(Japan)	**Kaiō**	8	-	7	-	0
					ø			O	ø	(Japan)	**Tochiazuma**	8	-	4	-	3
10	-	5	-	0		(Japan)	**Kotomitsuki**	S		(Japan)	Kotoshōgiku	7	-	8	-	0
8	-	7	-	0		(Mongolia)	**Ama**	K		(Mongolia)	Tokitenkū	7	-	8	-	0
6	-	9	-	0		(Japan)	Kisenosato	M1		(Japan)	**Toyonoshima**	8	-	7	-	0
4	-	11	-	0		(Mongolia)	Kyokutenhō	M2		(Mongolia)	Asasekiryū	4	-	11	-	0
4	-	4	-	7	ø	(Japan)	Miyabiyama	M3		(South Korea)	Kasugaō	5	-	10	-	0
3	-	12	-	0		(Japan)	Futen'ō	M4		(Japan)	Takekaze	7	-	8	-	0
11	-	4	-	0		(Japan)	**Hōmashō**	M5		(Japan)	Tamakasuga	4	-	11	-	0
7	-	8	-	0		(Japan)	Takamisakari	M6		(Japan)	**Kakizoe**	8	-	7	-	0
10	-	5	-	0		(Georgia (country))	**Kokkai**	M7		(Russia)	Rohō	7	-	8	-	0
7	-	8	-	0		(Japan)	Dejima	M8		(Japan)	**Tamanoshima**	10	-	5	-	0
9	-	6	-	0		(Japan)	**Aminishiki**	M9		(Japan)	Tochinonada	7	-	8	-	0
4	-	11	-	0		(Japan)	Kasuganishiki	M10		(Japan)	**Tokitsuumi**	8	-	7	-	0
5	-	10	-	0		(Japan)	Iwakiyama	M11		(Mongolia)	**Kakuryū**	9	-	6	-	0
6	-	9	-	0		(Japan)	Ushiomaru	M12		(Japan)	Yoshikaze	5	-	10	-	0
5	-	10	-	0		(Russia)	Hakurozan	M13	ø	(Estonia)	Baruto	0	-	0	-	15
11	-	4	-	0		(Japan)	**Tochiōzan**	M14		(Japan)	Tosanoumi	6	-	9	-	0
9	-	6	-	0		(Japan)	**Shimotori**	M15		(Japan)	**Tochinohana**	8	-	7	-	0
11	-	4	-	0		(Japan)	**Wakanosato**	M16	ø	(Japan)	Jūmonji	4	-	9	-	2

ø - Indicates a pull-out or absent rank
**winning record in bold**
**Yusho Winner**
***Won Playoff**

=== Natsu basho ===
Ryogoku Kokugikan, Tokyo, 13 May – 27 May

2007 Natsu basho results - Makuuchi Division
W		L		A	East			Rank	West			W		L		A
10	-	5	-	0		(Mongolia)	**Asashōryū**	Y	ø							
15	-	0	-	0		(Mongolia)	**Hakuhō**	O		(Bulgaria)	**Kotoōshū**	9	-	6	-	0
10	-	5	-	0		(Japan)	**Kaiō**	O	ø	(Japan)	Tochiazuma	0	-	0	-	0
					ø			O		(Japan)	**Chiyotaikai**	10	-	5	-	0
12	-	3	-	0		(Japan)	**Kotomitsuki**	S		(Mongolia)	**Ama**	8	-	7	-	0
4	-	11	-	0		(Japan)	Toyonoshima	K		(Japan)	Kotoshōgiku	7	-	8	-	0
5	-	10	-	0		(Japan)	Hōmashō	M1		(Mongolia)	**Tokitenkū**	8	-	7	-	0
3	-	12	-	0		(Georgia (country))	Kokkai	M2		(Japan)	Tamanoshima	6	-	9	-	0
0	-	12	-	3	ø	(Japan)	Kakizoe	M3		(Japan)	Kisenosato	6	-	9	-	0
9	-	6	-	0		(Japan)	**Aminishiki**	M4		(Japan)	Tochiōzan	6	-	9	-	0
8	-	7	-	0		(Japan)	**Takekaze**	M5		(Mongolia)	Kakuryū	6	-	9	-	0
3	-	12	-	0		(Japan)	Tokitsuumi	M6		(South Korea)	Kasugaō	5	-	10	-	0
9	-	6	-	0		(Japan)	**Takamisakari**	M7		(Japan)	**Wakanosato**	10	-	5	-	0
0	-	0	-	15	ø	(Mongolia)	Kyokutenhō	M8		(Mongolia)	**Asasekiryū**	12	-	3	-	0
10	-	5	-	0		(Russia)	**Rohō**	M9		(Japan)	**Miyabiyama**	9	-	6	-	0
12	-	3	-	0		(Japan)	**Dejima**	M10	ø	(Japan)	Shimotori	0	-	0	-	15
4	-	11	-	0		(Japan)	Ōtsukasa	M11		(Japan)	**Tochinonada**	8	-	7	-	0
5	-	10	-	0		(Japan)	Tamakasuga	M12		(Japan)	Satoyama	7	-	8	-	0
10	-	5	-	0		(Japan)	**Futen'ō**	M13		(Japan)	Tochinohana	4	-	11	-	0
10	-	5	-	0		(Mongolia)	**Ryūō**	M14		(Japan)	Hōchiyama	6	-	9	-	0
5	-	10	-	0		(Japan)	Ushiomaru	M15		(Japan)	Iwakiyama	6	-	9	-	0
9	-	6	-	0		(Japan)	**Hokutōriki**	M16		(Japan)	Kasuganishiki	4	-	11	-	0

ø - Indicates a pull-out or absent rank
**winning record in bold**
**Yusho Winner**

=== Nagoya basho ===
Aichi Prefectural Gymnasium, Nagoya, 8 July – 22 July

2007 Nagoya basho results - Makuuchi Division
W		L		A	East			Rank	West			W		L		A
14	-	1	-	0		(Mongolia)	**Asashōryū**	Y		(Mongolia)	**Hakuhō**	11	-	4	-	0
8	-	5	-	2	ø	(Japan)	**Kaiō**	O		(Japan)	**Chiyotaikai**	9	-	6	-	0
9	-	6	-	0		(Bulgaria)	**Kotoōshū**	O	ø							
13	-	2	-	0		(Japan)	**Kotomitsuki**	S		(Mongolia)	Ama	7	-	8	-	0
7	-	8	-	0		(Mongolia)	Tokitenkū	K		(Japan)	**Aminishiki**	8	-	7	-	0
5	-	10	-	0		(Japan)	Kotoshōgiku	M1		(Mongolia)	**Asasekiryū**	8	-	7	-	0
5	-	10	-	0		(Japan)	Dejima	M2		(Japan)	Wakanosato	5	-	10	-	0
4	-	11	-	0		(Japan)	Takekaze	M3	ø	(Russia)	Rohō	3	-	1	-	11
3	-	12	-	0		(Japan)	Takamisakari	M4		(Japan)	Toyonoshima	7	-	8	-	0
7	-	8	-	0		(Japan)	Miyabiyama	M5		(Japan)	Tamanoshima	6	-	9	-	0
9	-	6	-	0		(Japan)	**Hōmashō**	M6		(Japan)	**Kisenosato**	11	-	4	-	0
4	-	6	-	5	ø	(Japan)	Tochiōzan	M7		(Japan)	Futen'ō	5	-	10	-	0
9	-	6	-	0		(Mongolia)	**Kakuryū**	M8		(Mongolia)	Ryūō	5	-	10	-	0
10	-	5	-	0		(Japan)	**Tochinonada**	M9		(Georgia (country))	Kokkai	6	-	9	-	0
7	-	8	-	0		(South Korea)	Kasugaō	M10		(Japan)	**Hokutōriki**	10	-	5	-	0
8	-	7	-	0		(Japan)	**Tokitsuumi**	M11		(Japan)	Kitazakura	6	-	9	-	0
6	-	9	-	0		(Russia)	Hakurozan	M12		(Japan)	Satoyama	2	-	13	-	0
6	-	9	-	0		(Japan)	Yoshikaze	M13		(Japan)	**Tosanoumi**	8	-	7	-	0
0	-	2	-	13	ø	(Estonia)	Baruto	M14		(Japan)	**Toyohibiki**	11	-	4	-	0
10	-	5	-	0		(Japan)	**Kaihō**	M15		(Japan)	**Tamakasuga**	8	-	7	-	0
6	-	9	-	0		(Japan)	Kakizoe	M16		(Japan)	Hōchiyama	6	-	9	-	0
6	-	9	-	0		(Japan)	Ōtsukasa	M17	ø							

ø - Indicates a pull-out or absent rank
**winning record in bold**
**Yusho Winner**

=== Aki basho ===
Ryogoku Kokugikan, Tokyo, 9 September – 23 September

2007 Aki basho results - Makuuchi Division
W		L		A	East			Rank	West		W		L		A
0	-	0	-	15	ø	(Mongolia)	Asashōryū	Y	(Mongolia)	**Hakuhō**	13	-	2	-	0
9	-	6	-	0		(Japan)	**Chiyotaikai**	O	(Bulgaria)	**Kotoōshū**	8	-	7	-	0
1	-	5	-	9	ø	(Japan)	Kaiō	O	(Japan)	**Kotomitsuki**	10	-	5	-	0
10	-	5	-	0		(Japan)	**Aminishiki**	S	(Mongolia)	**Asasekiryū**	8	-	7	-	0
6	-	9	-	0		(Japan)	Kisenosato	K	(Mongolia)	**Ama**	10	-	5	-	0
6	-	9	-	0		(Mongolia)	Tokitenkū	M1	(Japan)	**Hōmashō**	8	-	7	-	0
4	-	11	-	0		(Japan)	Tochinonada	M2	(Mongolia)	Kakuryū	7	-	8	-	0
3	-	12	-	0		(Japan)	Hokutōriki	M3	(Japan)	**Kotoshōgiku**	10	-	5	-	0
8	-	7	-	0		(Japan)	**Dejima**	M4	(Japan)	Wakanosato	5	-	10	-	0
8	-	7	-	0		(Japan)	**Toyonoshima**	M5	(Japan)	**Miyabiyama**	9	-	6	-	0
7	-	8	-	0		(Japan)	Toyohibiki	M6	(Japan)	Kaihō	4	-	11	-	0
8	-	7	-	0		(Japan)	**Tamanoshima**	M7	(Japan)	Tokitsuumi	5	-	10	-	0
9	-	6	-	0		(Japan)	**Takekaze**	M8	(Japan)	Tosanoumi	6	-	9	-	0
6	-	9	-	0		(Russia)	Rohō	M9	(Japan)	**Takamisakari**	8	-	7	-	0
4	-	11	-	0		(Japan)	Iwakiyama	M10	(South Korea)	**Kasugaō**	10	-	5	-	0
8	-	7	-	0		(Japan)	**Tamakasuga**	M11	(Japan)	**Futen'ō**	8	-	7	-	0
7	-	8	-	0		(Georgia (country))	Kokkai	M12	(Mongolia)	**Kyokutenhō**	12	-	3	-	0
3	-	12	-	0		(Mongolia)	Ryūō	M13	(Japan)	Tochiōzan	7	-	8	-	0
4	-	11	-	0		(Japan)	Kitazakura	M14	(Japan)	**Gōeidō**	11	-	4	-	0
9	-	6	-	0		(Russia)	**Hakurozan**	M15	(Japan)	**Yoshikaze**	10	-	5	-	0
7	-	8	-	0		(Japan)	Kasuganishiki	M16	(Japan)	**Kakizoe**	9	-	6	-	0

ø - Indicates a pull-out or absent rank
**winning record in bold**
**Yusho Winner**

=== Kyushu basho ===
Fukuoka International Centre, Kyushu, 11 November – 25 November

2007 Kyushu basho results - Makuuchi Division
W		L		A	East			Rank	West			W		L		A
12	-	3	-	0		(Mongolia)	**Hakuhō**	Y	ø	(Mongolia)	Asashōryū	0	-	0	-	15
10	-	5	-	0		(Japan)	**Kotomitsuki**	O		(Japan)	**Chiyotaikai**	11	-	4	-	0
2	-	5	-	8	ø	(Bulgaria)	Kotoōshū	O		(Japan)	**Kaiō**	9	-	6	-	0
8	-	7	-	0		(Japan)	**Aminishiki**	S		(Mongolia)	Asasekiryū	3	-	12	-	0
10	-	5	-	0		(Mongolia)	**Ama**	K		(Japan)	**Kotoshōgiku**	9	-	6	-	0
3	-	12	-	0		(Japan)	Hōmashō	M1		(Japan)	Miyabiyama	7	-	8	-	0
9	-	6	-	0		(Japan)	**Kisenosato**	M2		(Japan)	**Dejima**	10	-	5	-	0
4	-	11	-	0		(Mongolia)	Kakuryū	M3		(Mongolia)	**Tokitenkū**	9	-	6	-	0
9	-	6	-	0		(Japan)	**Toyonoshima**	M4		(Mongolia)	Kyokutenhō	4	-	11	-	0
6	-	9	-	0		(Japan)	Takekaze	M5		(South Korea)	Kasugaō	4	-	11	-	0
4	-	11	-	0		(Japan)	Tamanoshima	M6		(Japan)	**Gōeidō**	8	-	7	-	0
7	-	8	-	0		(Japan)	Toyohibiki	M7		(Japan)	**Tochinonada**	8	-	7	-	0
8	-	7	-	0		(Japan)	**Wakanosato**	M8		(Japan)	Takamisakari	5	-	5	-	5
8	-	7	-	0		(Japan)	**Tamakasuga**	M9		(Japan)	Futen'ō	6	-	9	-	0
8	-	7	-	0		(Japan)	**Hokutōriki**	M10		(Japan)	Yoshikaze	4	-	11	-	0
7	-	8	-	0		(Japan)	Tosanoumi	M11	ø							
10	-	5	-	0		(Russia)	**Rohō**	M12		(Russia)	Hakurozan	3	-	12	-	0
9	-	6	-	0		(Georgia (country))	**Kokkai**	M13		(Russia)	**Wakanohō**	9	-	6	-	0
9	-	6	-	0		(Japan)	**Kakizoe**	M14		(Japan)	Kaihō	6	-	9	-	0
7	-	8	-	0		(Japan)	Tochiōzan	M15		(Japan)	**Wakakirin**	10	-	5	-	0
11	-	4	-	0		(Estonia)	**Baruto**	M16		(Japan)	Kasuganishiki	7	-	8	-	0

ø - Indicates a pull-out or absent rank
**winning record in bold**
**Yusho Winner**

== News ==
=== January ===
- 21: At the Hatsu basho in Tokyo, Yokozuna Asashoryu wins his fourth straight top makuuchi division championship or yusho, and 20th overall, with a 14–1 record. His only defeat is to veteran former ozeki Dejima on Day 3. Maegashira Toyonoshima finishes as runner-up with a 12–3 score and wins two special prizes, for Fighting Spirit and Technique. In the second highest juryo division, newcomer Toyohibiki wins the yusho after a three-way playoff with Tochiozan and Shimotori, who both earn promotion to the top division for the following tournament.

=== February ===
- 1: Isegahama stable, with a history dating back to 1859, shuts down.

=== March ===
- 25: Ozeki Hakuho comes into the final day of the Haru basho in Osaka level with fellow Mongolian Asashoryu. He defeats fellow ozeki Kotooshu while Asashoryu sidesteps Chiyotaikai. Both men finish on 13–2 and in the subsequent playoff Hakuho sidesteps Asashoryu to win his second championship. Tochiozan is rewarded for his fine 11–4 score in his top division debut with the Fighting Spirit Award, while Homasho also wins eleven and receives his second Technique Prize. Ozeki Tochiazuma withdraws from the tournament after suffering headaches and dizziness. Satoyama wins the juryo championship.

=== April ===
- 30: Toyonoshima, newly promoted to komusubi, is injured whilst training with Asashoryu at Tokitsukaze stable, damaging his ankle and knee ligaments. He is taken to hospital. Toyonoshima's stablemaster criticises the yokozuna.

=== May ===
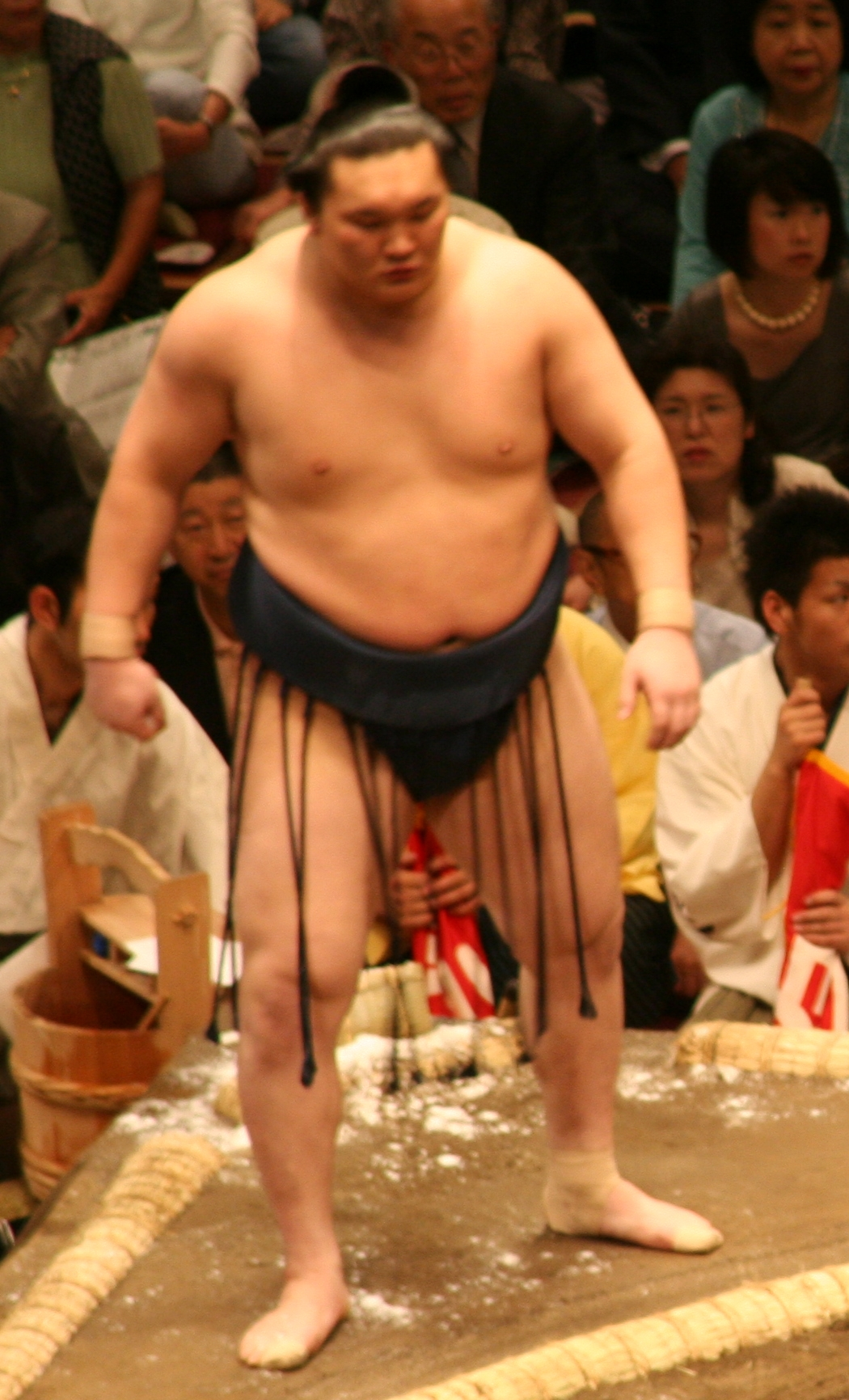
Hakuho on the opening day of the May tournament.

- 7: Tochiazuma announces his retirement from sumo, as he has been diagnosed with a cerebral infarction and been told it would be dangerous to continue as an active wrestler. He will work as a coach at his father's Tamanoi stable and is in line to succeed him in 2009.
- 7 :The Sumo Association suspend maegashira Kyokutenho for one tournament after he caused an accident whilst driving in April (wrestlers are forbidden from driving). He will drop to the juryo division as a result.
- 27: Hakuho wins his second successive championship at the Natsu basho in Tokyo with a perfect 15–0 record (zensho-yusho). Asashoryu manages only a 10–5 score. Three wrestlers finish as runner-up on 12–3: sekiwake Kotomitsuki, Asashoryu's stablemate Asasekiryu, and fellow maegashira Dejima. Asasekiryu wins the Technique Award while Dejima is awarded the Fighting Spirit Prize. The Outstanding Performance Prize is handed out for the first time this year, to maegashira Aminishiki for his defeat of Asashoryu. Estonian Baruto, who has fallen to the juryo division through injury, wins the championship and immediate promotion back to the top division. Former juryo wrestler Wakakirin wins the makushita division championship with an unbeaten 7–0 score. Oga and former juryo Fukuzono (a cousin of Izutsu Oyakata) announce their retirements.
- 30: Hakuho's promotion to yokozuna is officially confirmed. He becomes the 69th grand champion in sumo history, and is the third youngest after Kitanoumi and Taiho to hold the rank.

=== June ===
- 1: Hakuho performs the yokozuna dohyo-iri or ring-entering ceremony at the Meiji Shrine.
- 7–11: A tour and exhibition tournament are held in Hawaii, with 38 sekitori ranked wrestlers participating. It is the first time the Sumo Association has visited Hawaii in fourteen years.
- 26: Tokitaizan, an apprentice at the Tokitsukaze stable, dies after a practice session.

=== July ===
- 7: Baruto is injured in his opening match in Nagoya and withdraws from the tournament, meaning he will again fall to juryo.
- 22: Asashoryu wins his 21st championship with a 14–1 record. Kotomitsuki, competing for a modern record 22nd time as a sekiwake, is runner-up with 13–2. He seals promotion to ozeki and also wins the Technique and Fighting Spirit prizes. Toyohibiki also wins the Fighting Spirit Prize for his 11–4 record. Komusubi Aminishiki, who defeated Asashoryu on the opening day, receives his second Outstanding Performance Award in a row. Hakuho finishes his debut tournament as a yokozuna with an 11–4 record. Chiyotaikai competes in his 51st tournament as an ozeki, breaking the record held by Takanohana since 1981. Former komusubi Iwakiyama wins the juryo championship with a 12–3 score, defeating Kyokutenho and Goeido in a three-way playoff. All three wrestlers are promoted to makuuchi for the next tournament.
- 25: Kotomitsuki's promotion to ozeki is officially confirmed. At 31, he is the oldest man to reach sumo's second highest rank since the modern era of six tournaments a year began in 1958. Sadogatake stable becomes the first stable to have two ozeki simultaneously since Musashigawa stable in 2001. Attending the ceremony is Kotomitsuki's former stablemaster and mentor, the ex-yokozuna Kotozakura, who retired as Sadogatake head in 2005. He dies just three weeks later.
- 25: Asashoryu excuses himself from the forthcoming regional tour after submitting a medical certificate to the Sumo Association citing an elbow injury which requires six weeks of rest.
- 26: Asashoryu energetically participates in a charity soccer match in his native Mongolia with Japanese football star Hidetoshi Nakata.
- 27: The elders in charge of the regional tour criticise Asashoryu for neglecting his duties as a yokozuna, with Takadagawa saying, "In the 200 year history of sumo, exhibition events have been just as important as hon-basho... we will not stand for selfishness on the Yokozuna's part where he comes and goes as he pleases."
- 30: The Sumo Association orders Asashoryu to return to Japan.
- 31 Asashoryu receives another examination of his elbow at a Tokyo hospital. The Mongolian government apologises to the Sumo Association through the Mongolian embassy, for requesting Asashoryu's participation in the charity event.

=== August ===
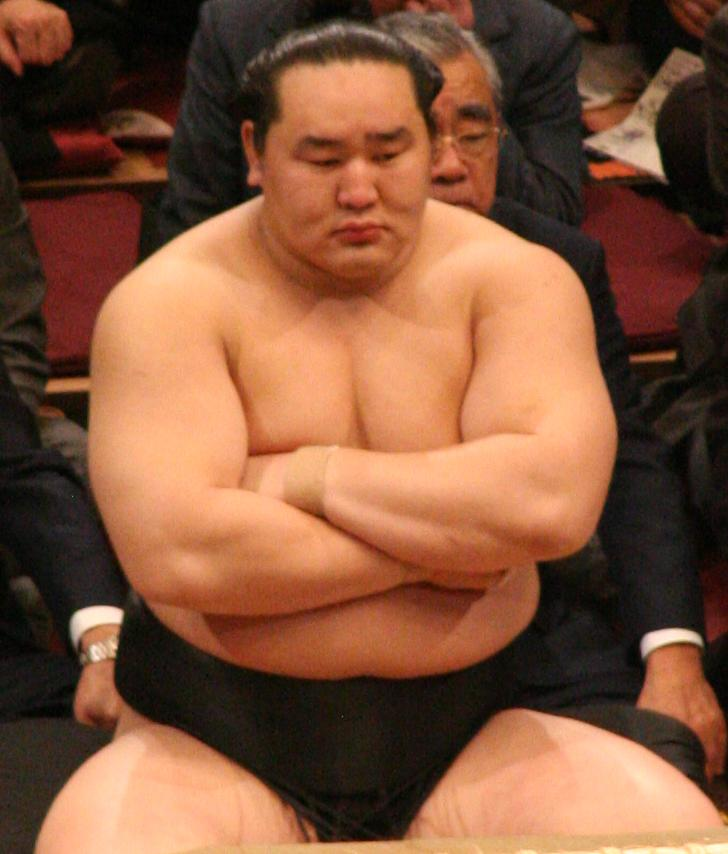
Asashoryu

- 1: The Sumo Association elders meet and decide to suspend Asashoryu from the next two honbasho in September and November, marking the first time that an active yokozuna has been suspended from competition. Asashoryu and his stablemaster Takasago are also given a 30 percent pay cut for the next four months. He is ordered to restrict his movements to his home, his stable and hospital.
- 3: The summer regional tour of Tohoku and Hokkaido begins.
- 6: Takasago finally meets with his deshi Asashoryu, who has not left his home since his suspension.
- 7: At a press conference, Takasago announces that a psychiatrist has examined Asashoryu and diagnosed him as suffering from acute stress disorder. The head of the Sumo Association's clinic says that he should either be hospitalised or be allowed to return to Mongolia.
- 15: The Ministry of Education criticises the Sumo Association for its handling of the Asashoryu affair.
- 20: Asashoryu is re-examined by another Sumo Association doctor who diagnoses dissociative disorder.
- 21: The regional tour ends.
- 23: Asashoryu leaves his home for the first time since his suspension was announced on the 1st.
- 28: The Sumo Association decide to allow Asashoryu to depart to Mongolia for treatment, accompanied by his stablemaster.
- 30: Asashoryu arrives in Mongolia, dodging the waiting media and fans.

=== September ===
- 9: The Aki basho opens, with Asashoryu absent from the beginning of a tournament for the first time. Hakuho is defeated by komusubi Ama.
- 19: Hakuho is defeated by maegashira Toyonoshima.
- 23: Hakuho wins his first yusho as a yokozuna with a 13–2 record. He finishes one win ahead of Kyokutenho, who receives his fifth Fighting Spirit Award on his return to the top division. Goeido scores 11–4 in his makuuchi debut and also wins the Fighting Spirit Award. Ama and Toyonoshima share the Outstanding Performance Prize for their wins over Hakuho, the first time either man has won the Shukun-sho. In the juryo division Baruto wins his third championship with a 13–2 record and returns to the top division once again. Wakakirin and Russian Wakanoho score 9–6 and 10–5 respectively and are promoted to makuuchi for the first time for the November tournament. Former sekiwake Takanowaka, who has fallen to the makushita division, announces his retirement. Former maegashira Wakatoba also retires.
- 26: It is reported that police in Nagoya are building a criminal case over the death of Tokitaizan in June. The head of the Tokitsukaze stable, and three of his wrestlers, are alleged to have struck the boy with an aluminium bat and kicked him after an intense 30 minute training session, as punishment for running away from the stable the day before.
- 27: Tokitaizan's father holds a press conference and says he wants to know the truth about his son's death. He says he was "shocked" when he saw he extent of the bruises, cuts and burns on his son's body.

=== October ===
- 1: The head coach of the Tokitsukaze stable, the former Futatsuryu, is summoned to meet Sumo Association chairman Kitanoumi. Kitanoumi comments afterwards that Futatsuryu had initially claimed that Tokitaizan had died of a pre-existing medical condition.
- 5: Following a meeting of elders, Futatsuryu is dismissed from the Sumo Association for his part in the death of Tokitaizan. It is the first time a head of a stable has been dismissed. Tokitsuumi, a long serving and well respected maegashira in the stable, retires and immediately takes over as the new head. In addition, Kitanoumi cuts his own pay in half and the pay of all the other directors of the Sumo Association by 30 percent, for the next six months.
- 11: The newly installed Tokitsukaze Oyataka visits the family of Tokitaizan in Niigata.

=== November ===
- 25: Hakuho wins the championship in Kyushu with a 12–3 record. His final day loss to Kotomitsuki does not affect the result as his only challenger, ozeki Chiyotaikai withdraws from the tournament after injuring his elbow in a defeat to Hakuho on Day 14. He nonetheless finishes runner-up on 11–4, his best result for two years. Baruto also finishes on 11–4, coming unscathed through a top division tournament for the first time in a year, and wins his second Fighting Spirit Prize. Ama wins his second successive Outstanding Performance Award, and fellow komusubi Kotoshogiku receives his second Technique Award. Ichihara, in his debut tournament in the juryo division, loses a playoff to Sakaizawa after both men finish on 13–2 but is immediately promoted to the top division for January 2008, the first time since 1991 that a wrestler has reached makuuchi after spending only one tournament in juryo. Tosayutaka, who has not lost a bout since he was in the jonokuchi division in May, brings a little cheer to the beleaguered Tokitsukaze stable by winning the makushita championship with a perfect 7–0 record.
- 25: The 46-year-old jonidan wrestler Ichinoya, the oldest man in modern professional sumo, announces his retirement. Also retiring is Kyokutenzan, one of the original group of Mongolians to join sumo in 1992.
- 30: Asashoryu returns to Japan from Mongolia where he has been receiving onsen treatment for his elbow, and apologises for his actions at a press conference. He says he is "dedicated to continuing to fulfil my duties as a yokozuna to the best of my ability."
- 30: Former yokozuna Asahifuji changes his toshiyori name from Ajigawa to the more prestigious Isegahama, and renames his Ajigawa stable Isegahama stable.

== Deaths ==
- April 17: Former komusubi Wakanami, aged 66, dies of pneumonia.
- June 26: Tokitaizan, a new recruit, dies in an incident at his stable aged 17.
- August 14: the former Kotozakura, who was sumo's 53rd Yokozuna from 1973 to 1974 and the head of the Sadogatake stable from 1974 until his retirement in 2005, dies during surgery after diabetes complications, aged 66.

== See also ==
- Glossary of sumo terms
- List of active sumo wrestlers
- List of past sumo wrestlers
- List of years in sumo
- List of yokozuna
