= Yutakayama =

Yutakayama is a shikona used by sumo wrestlers in the Tokitsukaze stable. It may refer to:

- Yutakayama Katsuo, born 1937, a former sumo wrestler and former head of the Japan Sumo Association
- Yutakayama Hiromitsu, born 1947, former sumo wrestler
- Yutakayama Ryōta, born 1993, former sumo wrestler
