= Tosayutaka Yūya =

Japanese sumo wrestler

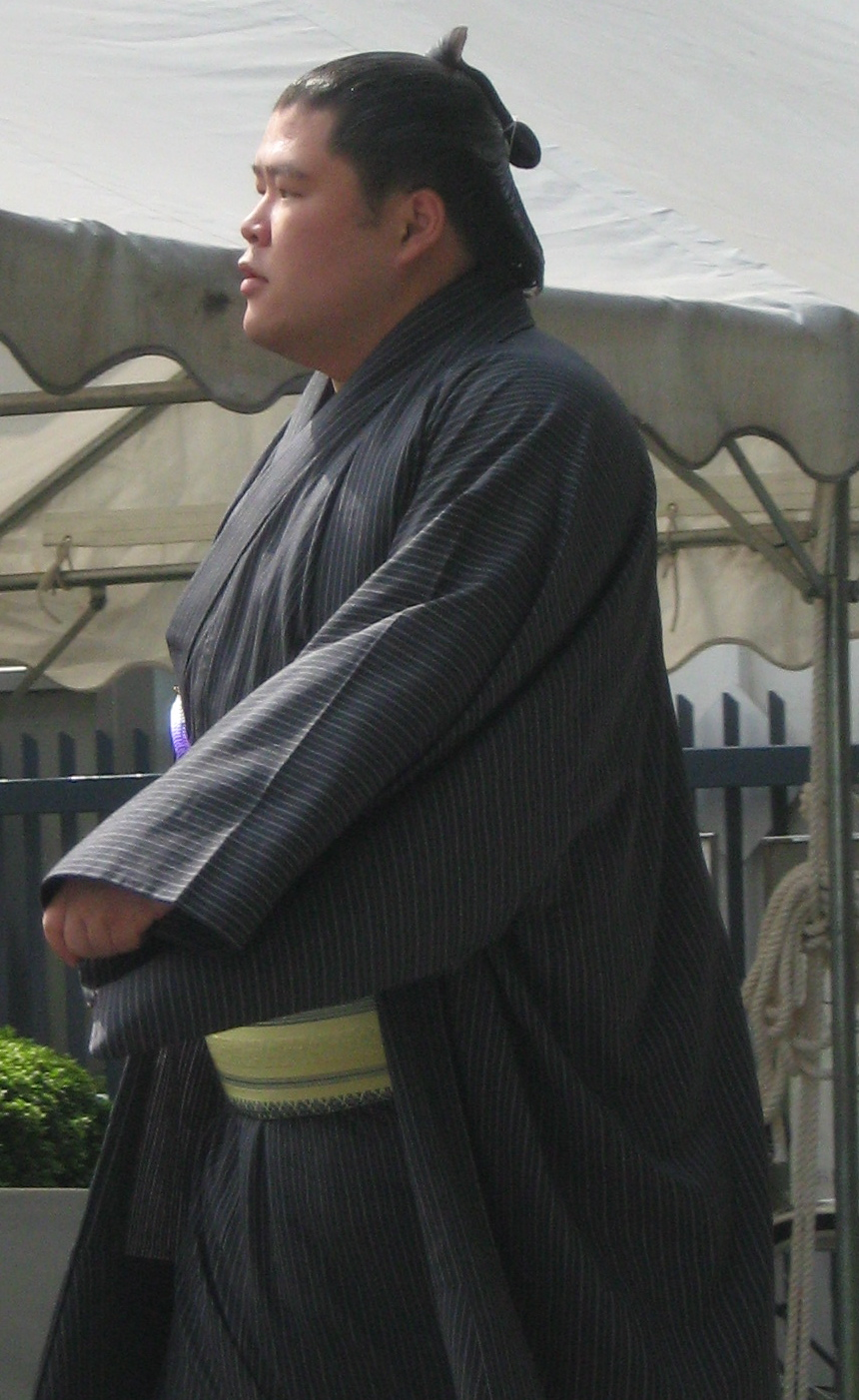

Personal information
- Native name: 土佐豊 祐哉
- Born: Yūya Morishita; 10 March 1985 (age 41) Kōchi, Japan
- Height: 1.78 m (5 ft 10 in)
- Weight: 147 kg (324 lb; 23.1 st)

Sport
- Sport: Sumo
- University team: Tokyo University of Agriculture
- Retired: January 2016
- Heya: Tokitsukaze
- Record: 294-254-71
- Debut: March 2007
- Highest rank: Maegashira #1 (July 2011)
- Elder name: Tokitsukaze
- Championships: 2 (Makushita); 2 (Sandanme); 1 (Jonidan)
- Updated on Feb 26, 2021

Tosayutaka Yūya (born 10 March 1985) is a former sumo wrestler from Tosa City, Kōchi Prefecture, Japan. He made his professional debut in March 2007, reaching the top makuuchi division in July 2009. His highest rank was maegashira 1. After a long hiatus due to injury, he worked his way back up the ranks, logging several lower division championships on the way. In January 2015 he finally reached the top division again after an 18 tournament absence. His comeback from sandanme 84 was the lowest any wrestler since World War II has fallen and still managed to again reach the top division, until surpassed by Terunofuji. After further injury setbacks he announced his retirement in January 2016. He became stablemaster of Tokitsukaze stable in February 2021 after the Japan Sumo Association asked the previous stablemaster to retire.

== Early life and sumo background ==
Yūya Morishita went to high school in his home prefecture, Kōchi. While attending the Kōchi Prefecture Industrial High school he took the high school sumo championship. Upon entering the Tokyo University of Agriculture, he was very active in sumo, but never achieved one of the four amateur titles that would have allowed him makushita tsukedashi status, which lets experienced wrestlers start professional sumo at a higher division than other wrestlers. The shikona that he eventually settled on takes the two Chinese characters used for the city of his birth Tosa City and the third kanji was taken from one of the characters from his father's dharma name. There are other wrestlers in the past from the same Tokitsukaze stable that used this character in their ring names but this is coincidental.

== Career ==
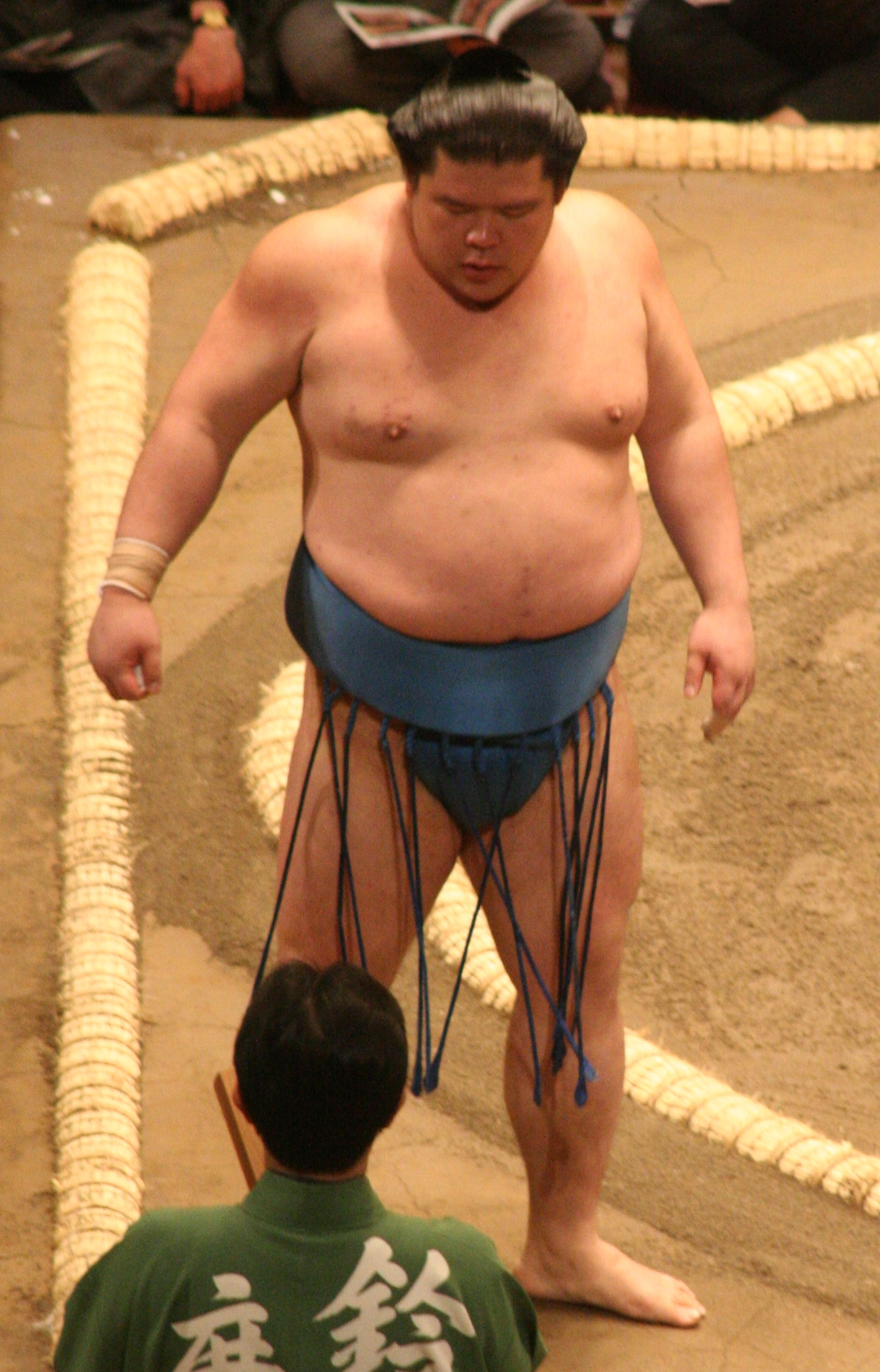

In his May, 2007 jonokuchi division debut tournament, he posted an impressive 6-1 record. In the next three tournaments he would go on to win three consecutive championships in each successive division. His third consecutive championship, which he achieved at his makushita debut ranked at #33, was not enough to promote him directly to the next jūryō division, but his 5-2 record ranked at makushita #4 in the following January 2008 tournament was more than enough to grant him a jūryō promotion. In the achievement of this feat, he logged 30 consecutive wins, a record for a wrestler in makushita and below. During this span, after his defeat on the 6th day of the May 2007 tournament he did not lose again until his bout with Aran on the 11th day of the January 2008 tournament. He had made juryo in just six tournaments from his professional debut, tying the long-standing record held by Itai.

His fortunes would change somewhat for his jūryō debut in the following tournament. Possibly due to stress from the then ongoing investigation into the hazing scandal at his stable, as well as an injury to his toe on the 12th day, Tosayutaka only managed an uncharacteristic 6-9 record. His first demotion dropped him to the top makushita slot, but a convincing 4-3 record put him straight back in jūryō for the July 2008 tournament in Nagoya. In his next 5 consecutive jūryō appearances after this, he only had one make-koshi.

He was promoted to the top makuuchi division in September 2009, and came through with a winning record. After a 6-9 in November, he had two kachi-koshi performances of 8-7 and 10-5 in his next two makuuchi appearances, which saw him promoted to the upper maegashira ranks for the first time. He defeated ozeki Kotooshu but could win only two other bouts. After a quiet year or so in the mid-maegashira ranks, he was promoted to his highest rank to date of maegashira 1 following a 10-5 score in the May 2011 Technical Examination Tournament. In the July tournament he injured his knee on Day 3 against Kotooshu and had to withdraw for the first time in his career. He could manage only a 4-11 record on his return in September, and was demoted to jūryō. Although he made an immediate return to makuuchi for the January tournament, he was unable to re–establish himself in the top division and recorded another 4–11 score.

He was unable to compete after pulling out of the July 2012 tournament due to a knee injury at the rank of jūryō 8 and dropped to the fourth sandanme division after missing three tournaments in a row. However, he had made a complete recovery upon his return and achieved a perfect record and the sandanme championship after a playoff win. After six tournaments in makushita with all but one winning tournament, one of which was the championship in the division in November 2013, Tosayutaka finally earned promotion back to the salaried ranks for the May 2014 tournament. After a series of steady scores in jūryō, a 9-6 performance at the rank of Jūryō 5 was, somewhat unusually, good enough to earn promotion to the top division as there were four openings and only three men above him had kachi-koshi scores. He returned to makuuchi in January 2015, a comeback from the rank of sandanme 84 in March 2013 - which at the time was the lowest any top division wrestler earning promotion back has fallen. The same fate would befall him again, however, when just two days into his makuuchi comeback he suffered a medial collateral ligament injury. In July 2015 he underwent surgery and again dropped down to the sandanme ranks due to his repeated absences.

== Retirement from sumo ==
In January 2016 Tosayutaka finally made the decision to retire. He has stayed in sumo as a coach at his stable, initially under the elder name of Ajigawa Oyakata (stock borrowed from the active wrestler Aminishiki) From October 2016 he was Sanoyama Oyakata (owned by Chiyootori), but in April 2018 he switched to Magaki. His danpatsu-shiki or official retirement ceremony was held in a hotel at the same time as his wedding reception in October 2016.

Tosayutaka became the stablemaster of Tokitsukaze stable in February 2021 after the Sumo Association asked the previous stablemaster, former maegashira Tokitsuumi, to retire for violating COVID-19 safety protocols. His appointment continues the association of the head of the stable with the Tokyo University of Agriculture, which Tokitsuumi and Yutakayama Katsuo also attended.

== Fighting style ==
Tosayutaka listed his favourite techniques as migi yotsu, a left hand outside and right hand inside grip on the opponent's mawashi, and nage or throws. His most common winning kimarite was yorikiri (force out), which accounted for nearly half his victories in his career.

== Family ==
Tosayutaka announced at a press conference in February 2016 that he would be marrying TV personality Eri Koizumi. They have been in a relationship since 2009. Tosayutaka remarked that he would have retired much earlier than he did were it not for her support. The marriage was registered in March and the wedding reception was held in October. They have two daughters and one son.

== Career record ==
Tosayutaka Yūya
Year	January Hatsu basho, Tokyo	March Haru basho, Osaka	May Natsu basho, Tokyo	July Nagoya basho, Nagoya	September Aki basho, Tokyo	November Kyūshū basho, Fukuoka
2007	x	(Maezumo)	West Jonokuchi #9; 6–1	East Jonidan #57; 7–0; Champion	West Sandanme #57; 7–0; Champion	West Makushita #33; 7–0; Champion
2008	East Makushita #4; 5–2	West Jūryō #12; 6–9	West Makushita #1; 4–3	West Jūryō #14; 9–6	East Jūryō #10; 11–4	West Jūryō #2; 7–8
2009	West Jūryō #3; 9–6	East Jūryō #2; 8–7	East Jūryō #1; 9–6	West Maegashira #14; 8–7	East Maegashira #10; 6–9	East Maegashira #13; 8–7
2010	West Maegashira #12; 10–5	West Maegashira #4; 3–12	East Maegashira #9; 7–8	West Maegashira #10; 8–7	West Maegashira #7; 6–9	West Maegashira #10; 9–6
2011	West Maegashira #7; 7–8	Tournament Cancelled; 0–0–0	East Maegashira #9; 10–5	East Maegashira #1; 0–4–11	East Maegashira #14; 4–11	East Jūryō #5; 10–5
2012	West Maegashira #12; 4–11	West Jūryō #2; 6–7–2	West Jūryō #6; 6–9	West Jūryō #8; 2–6–7	West Makushita #3; Sat out due to injury 0–0–7	West Makushita #43; Sat out due to injury 0–0–7
2013	East Sandanme #24; Sat out due to injury 0–0–7	West Sandanme #84; 7–0–P; Champion	West Makushita #47; 6–1	East Makushita #21; 5–2	West Makushita #12; 0–4–3	East Makushita #48; 7–0; Champion
2014	West Makushita #5; 5–2	East Makushita #1; 5–2	East Jūryō #10; 8–7	West Jūryō #8; 11–4	East Jūryō #4; 6–9	East Jūryō #5; 9–6
2015	West Maegashira #16; 0–2–13	West Jūryō #11; 6–9	West Jūryō #14; 7–8	West Makushita #1; 1–6	West Makushita #20; Sat out due to injury 0–0–7	West Makushita #60; Sat out due to injury 0–0–7
2016	West Sandanme #40; Retired; 2–5	x	x	x	x	x
Record given as wins–losses–absences Top division champion Top division runner-up Retired Lower divisions Non-participation Sanshō key: F=Fighting spirit; O=Outstanding performance; T=Technique Also shown: ★=Kinboshi; P=Playoff(s); Divisions: Makuuchi — Jūryō — Makushita — Sandanme — Jonidan — Jonokuchi Makuuchi ranks: Yokozuna — Ōzeki — Sekiwake — Komusubi — Maegashira

== See also ==
- Glossary of sumo terms
- List of past sumo wrestlers
- List of sumo elders
