= Tokitsuumi Masahiro =

Japanese sumo wrestler

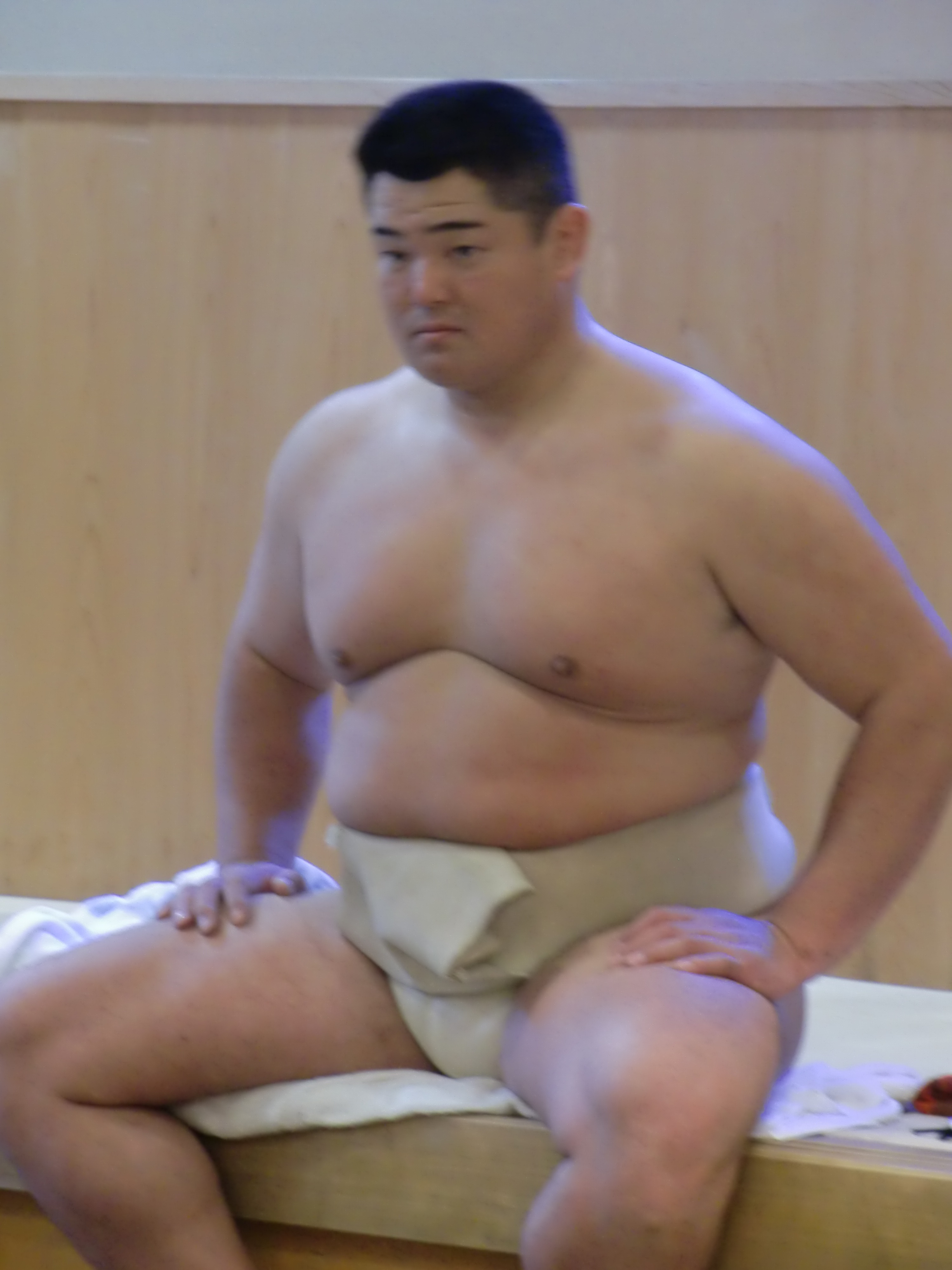

Personal information
- Native name: 時津海 正博
- Born: Masahiro Sakamoto; November 8, 1973 (age 52) Nagasaki, Japan
- Height: 1.83 m (6 ft 0 in)
- Weight: 133 kg (293 lb)

Sport
- Sport: Sumo
- University team: Tokyo University of Agriculture
- Retired: October 2007
- Heya: Tokitsukaze
- Record: 466-485-43
- Debut: March 1996
- Highest rank: Maegashira 3 (November 2001)
- Elder name: Tokitsukaze
- Championships: 2 (Jūryō)
- Special Prizes: 4 (Technique)
- Updated on October 2007

Tokitsuumi Masahiro (born November 8, 1973, as Masahiro Sakamoto) is a former professional sumo wrestler from Fukue, Nagasaki, Japan. A former amateur sumo champion, he turned professional in 1996. His highest rank was maegashira 3. He became the head coach of Tokitsukaze stable in 2007 following the dismissal of the previous stablemaster. He was asked to retire by the Japan Sumo Association in February 2021 for violating COVID-19 safety protocols.

== Early life ==
With influence from his father, Tokitsuumi participated in sumo competitions from the age of three, and after a stint with judo in junior high school, he began practicing sumo again in high school and university. He did very well in sumo at Tokyo University of Agriculture, but after graduating, he passed an entrance test to begin working at a printing company and was planning to have a career with them. But, his father, after seeing his continued success in amateur sumo, suggested he try his hand at professional sumo. Soon afterwards, he was recruited by the former ōzeki Yutakayama, a fellow Tokyo University of Agriculture graduate, and joined his Tokitsukaze stable. He made his debut in March 1996 at the age of 22.

== Career ==
After joining at the bottom of the third makushita division, Tokitsuumi took just over a year to reach the elite sekitori ranks, making the second highest jūryō division in May 1997. He won the jūryō division championship at his first attempt with a 12–3 record, but then fell flat with a 5–10 mark in the next tournament. In July 1998 he produced a 10–5 score at the rank of jūryō 2 and was promoted to the top makuuchi division for September.

Tokitsuumi had a long career in the top makuuchi division. His four special prizes for Technique were evidence of his ability, but he always struggled when promoted above the mid-level maegashira ranks. He never reached a san'yaku rank, his highest rank being maegashira 3. A poor result in 2005 took him down to jūryō but he immediately recovered his position in top division by winning the jūryō championship for the second time in July 2005. His best score in the top division was a 12–3 result in January 2006. Just two tournaments later he suffered an injury which took him down to jūryō once again, and it took him three tournaments to get back. However he showed few signs of slowing down, comfortably holding his own in the lower maegashira ranks in 2007.

== Fighting style ==
Tokitsuumi was a yotsu-sumo wrestler who preferred fighting on the mawashi to pushing or thrusting. His favoured grip was migi-yotsu, with his left hand outside and right hand inside his opponent's arms. He won over 40 per cent of his matches by yori-kiri, or force out. He was also fond of shitatenage, or underarm throw.

== Retirement ==
On October 9, 2007, he suddenly retired from being an active sumo wrestler and became head coach of Tokitsukaze stable, after the previous head coach (former komusubi Futatsuryū) was dismissed by the Japan Sumo Association for his involvement in a hazing scandal. He was initially reluctant to do so, having not yet reached san'yaku, but was persuaded by the former Yutakayama, who had always regarded him as his preferred successor. He was a popular choice among his fellow wrestlers.

In a highly unusual move, the banzuke (or ranking sheet) for the November 2007 tournament contained a blank space in the rank where Tokitsuumi's name ought to have appeared (West maegashira 11). Ordinarily, when a wrestler retires he does not succeed immediately as a head coach and owner of a stable. In this case, due to the unusual nature of the dismissal of the previous Tokitsukaze stablemaster, he acquired both the stable and toshiyori-kabu (coaching license) for the Tokitsukaze name immediately on retirement. Had his name remained on the banzuke he would therefore have been listed twice. The blank space was left to avoid the confusion in the rankings that would otherwise result. The last time a comparable situation occurred was in 1873, when two wrestlers were expelled from professional sumo as agitators. They formed a new organization (the modern Takasago stable). On that occasion, their names were blotted out of the banzuke with ink.

His official retirement ceremony, or danpatsu-shiki, took place at the Ryōgoku Kokugikan on October 5, 2008.

In June 2010 he faced censure for his involvement in the gambling scandal rocking the sumo world, after it was revealed that he had illegally bet on baseball while still an active wrestler. On July 4 he was demoted to the lowest toshiyori level on the elder hierarchy, with no opportunity for re-promotion for at least five years.

Tokitsukaze has produced the top division wrestlers Tosayutaka, Shōdai and Yutakayama.

Tokitsuumi was told not to leave his house and prevented from attending the September 2020 tournament after he breached the Sumo Association's COVID-19 guidelines by travelling to another prefecture. In the same month he was unable to take part in the ceremony marking Shōdai's promotion to ōzeki, despite having been given permission to do so, due to an acute illness. He was demoted from iin level to the lowest toshiyori level by the Sumo Association on October 1. During his trip he had engaged in several non-essential activities such as eating out, playing golf and visiting his home town of Gotō, Nagasaki.

In January 2021 the Sumo Association said it was again investigating Tokitsuumi for possible COVID-19 safety protocol violations, after he was reported to have visited a mahjong parlor. The Sumo Association formally requested Tokitsuumi's retirement on 22 February, which he accepted.

In February 2025 it was reported that Tokitsuumi was arrested in Tokyo for using a forged permit to park his vehicle in a spot designated for people with disabilities.

== Family ==
His sons, Hirokazu and Shoma, joined professional sumo in May 2021 after graduating from high school. They were initially scheduled to join Tokitsukaze stable, but following their father's resignation joined Tatsunami stable. Hirokazu and Shoma took the shikona Kiryuko and Shunrai respectively. Kiryuko was promoted to juryo after the July 2024 tournament, the 12th time in sumo history that a father and son have both made the sekitori ranks.

== Career record ==
Tokitsuumi Masahiro
Year	January Hatsu basho, Tokyo	March Haru basho, Osaka	May Natsu basho, Tokyo	July Nagoya basho, Nagoya	September Aki basho, Tokyo	November Kyūshū basho, Fukuoka
1996	x	Makushita tsukedashi #60; 6–1	East Makushita #31; 5–2	East Makushita #17; 4–3	West Makushita #11; 4–3	East Makushita #9; 4–3
1997	West Makushita #5; 5–2	West Makushita #2; 5–2	West Jūryō #13; 12–3; Champion	West Jūryō #3; 5–10	East Jūryō #8; 9–6	West Jūryō #3; 8–7
1998	West Jūryō #2; 4–11	West Jūryō #9; 9–6	West Jūryō #5; 8–7	East Jūryō #2; 10–5	West Maegashira #14; 8–7	East Maegashira #13; 9–6
1999	East Maegashira #5; 4–11	West Maegashira #11; 9–6	West Maegashira #6; 4–11	East Maegashira #13; 8–7	East Maegashira #10; 7–8	East Maegashira #12; 8–7
2000	West Maegashira #11; 9–6	East Maegashira #7; 7–8	West Maegashira #8; 5–10	West Maegashira #11; 9–6	East Maegashira #10; 7–8	East Maegashira #12; 8–7
2001	West Maegashira #9; 8–7	East Maegashira #4; 6–9	West Maegashira #6; 4–11	West Maegashira #13; 11–4; T	West Maegashira #4; 9–6	East Maegashira #3; 2–13
2002	East Maegashira #11; 11–4; T	West Maegashira #4; 2–6–7	East Maegashira #11; Sat out due to injury 0–0–15	East Maegashira #11; 8–7	West Maegashira #6; 7–8	West Maegashira #7; 8–7
2003	West Maegashira #4; 5–10	East Maegashira #8; 8–5–2	East Maegashira #7; Sat out due to injury 0–0–15	East Maegashira #7; 9–6; T	West Maegashira #3; 5–10	West Maegashira #6; 8–7
2004	East Maegashira #4; 7–8	East Maegashira #5; 8–7	East Maegashira #4; 7–8	East Maegashira #6; 6–9	West Maegashira #8; 5–10	East Maegashira #14; 8–7
2005	East Maegashira #12; 5–10	East Maegashira #16; 8–7	West Maegashira #12; 3–12	West Jūryō #3; 11–4; Champion	West Maegashira #14; 4–11	West Jūryō #3; 9–6
2006	West Maegashira #14; 12–3; T	West Maegashira #5; 2–13	East Maegashira #16; 2–9–4	East Jūryō #9; 8–7	West Jūryō #6; 8–7	East Jūryō #4; 10–5
2007	West Maegashira #12; 8–7	West Maegashira #10; 8–7	East Maegashira #6; 3–12	East Maegashira #11; 8–7	West Maegashira #7; 5–10	Retired –
Record given as wins–losses–absences Top division champion Top division runner-up Retired Lower divisions Non-participation Sanshō key: F=Fighting spirit; O=Outstanding performance; T=Technique Also shown: ★=Kinboshi; P=Playoff(s); Divisions: Makuuchi — Jūryō — Makushita — Sandanme — Jonidan — Jonokuchi Makuuchi ranks: Yokozuna — Ōzeki — Sekiwake — Komusubi — Maegashira

== See also ==
- Glossary of sumo terms
- List of sumo tournament second division champions
- List of past sumo wrestlers
- List of sumo elders
