= Shimotori Norio =

Japanese sumo wrestler

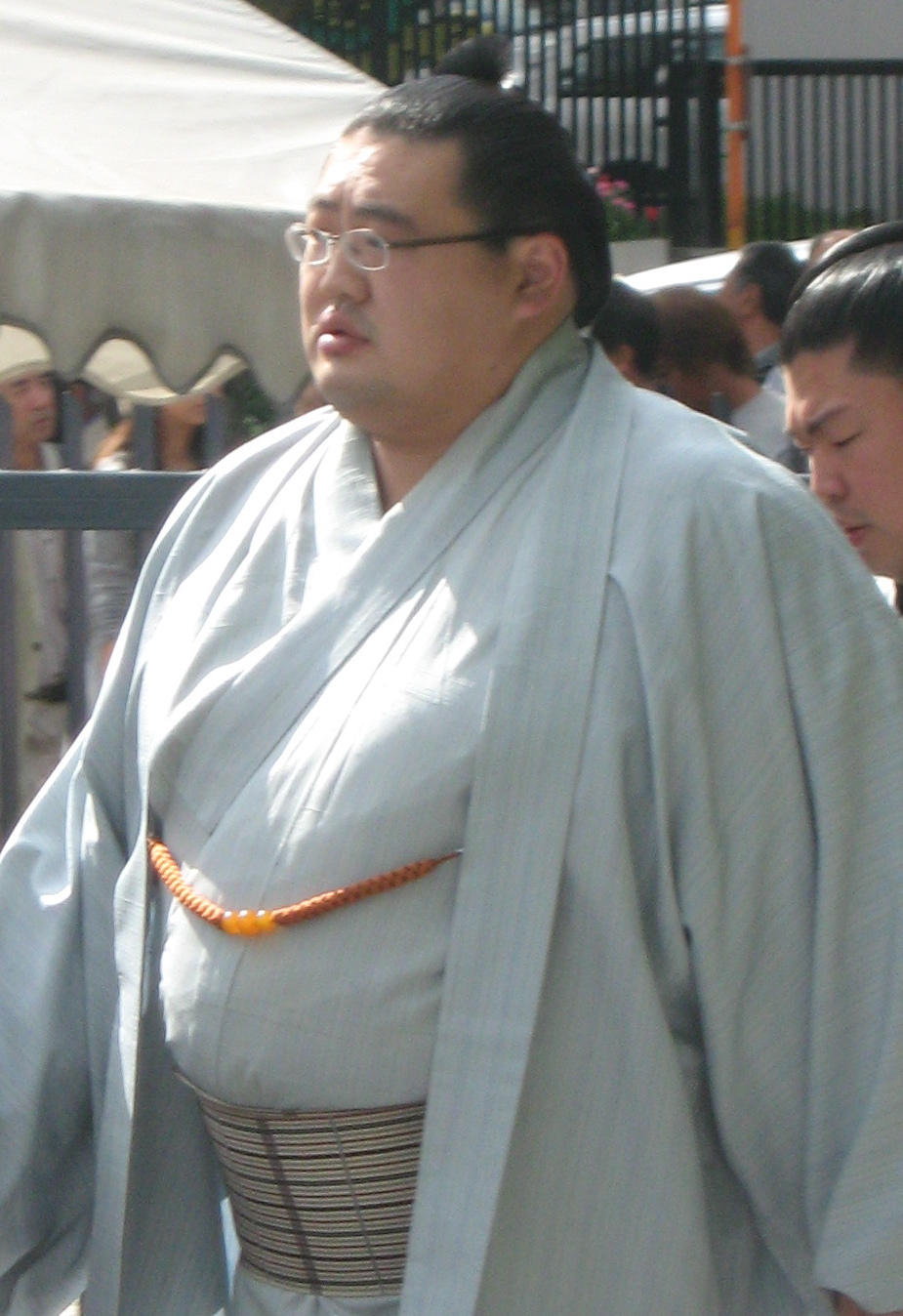

Personal information
- Native name: 霜鳳 典雄
- Born: Norio Shimotori; March 18, 1978 (age 48) Niigata, Japan
- Height: 1.88 m (6 ft 2 in)
- Weight: 143 kg (315 lb; 22.5 st)

Sport
- Sport: Sumo
- Retired: April 2011
- Heya: Tokitsukaze
- Record: 449-427-51
- Debut: May 2000
- Highest rank: Komusubi (March 2004)
- Special Prizes: Fighting Spirit (1)
- Gold Stars: 1 (Musashimaru)
- Updated on Jan 2011

Shimotori Norio (born March 18, 1978) is a former sumo wrestler from Arai, Niigata Prefecture, Japan. A former amateur champion, he made his professional debut in 2000 and first reached the top division in 2002, although due to injuries he had trouble maintaining that position. He earned one special prize, for Fighting Spirit. His highest rank was komusubi. He was forced to retire in April 2011 after an investigation by the Japan Sumo Association found him guilty of match-fixing.

== Career ==
Shimotori competed in amateur sumo at Tokyo University of Agriculture, but did not manage to win a major national title. He was recruited by the Tokitsukaze stable and made his professional debut in May 2000, almost a year later than intended due to injuries from a traffic accident. Due to his amateur record he was given makushita tsukedashi status and began at the bottom of the third highest makushita division.

Shimotori reached sekitori status in May 2001 upon promotion to the second highest jūryō division, and he made steady progress, rising to jūryō 3 by January 2002, where a 12-3 score and a playoff for the yusho or championship with Takamisakari earned him promotion to the top makuuchi division for March 2002. In July 2002 in only his third top division tournament he earned a kinboshi or gold star for defeating Musashimaru in his first ever bout against a yokozuna, easily the best win of his career. He was also awarded the Fighting Spirit prize in this tournament. He was not able to follow up this promising performance however, and slipped back into the jūryō division briefly in 2003. In January 2004 he produced a strong 11-4 record from the maegashira 7 ranking (although fighting only his fellow maegashira) and was promoted all the way to komusubi for the March 2004 tournament. However he managed only a 6-9 score fighting all the top ranked wrestlers in his komusubi debut and never managed to return to the titled sanyaku ranks.

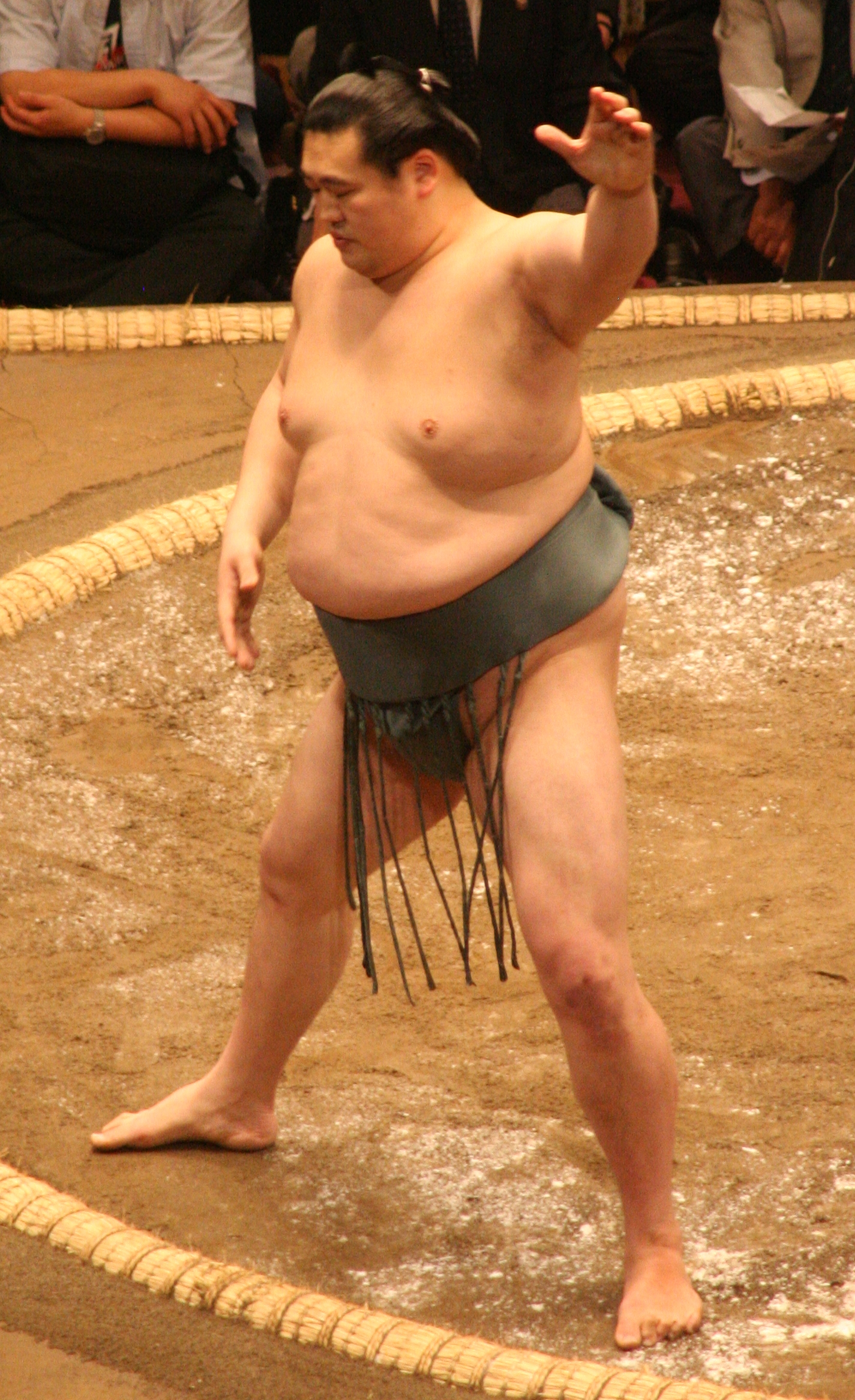
Shimotori in May 2009

After missing the whole of the November 2005 tournament through injury Shimotori struggled to maintain his position in the top division, spending most of 2006 in jūryō. He returned to the top division in March 2007, after having just won the jūryō championship, in a three-way playoff and despite losing the initial bout. His fifth top division stay proved however short-lived yet again as he was unable to compete at all in the May 2007 tournament due to a herniated disk suffered during training in April. In November 2007 he produced a 10-5 score at the rank of Jūryō 4 which was enough to earn promotion back to the top division for the January 2008 tournament. A recurrence of his injury in winning his opening bout forced him to withdraw from the rest of this tournament and sent him back in the jūryō division for another year.

Shimotori ensured himself of his seventh promotion to the top division with his 10-5 performance at the rank of jūryō 2 in January 2009, and came through with a winning record at Maegashira 14 in March. He could score only 4-11 at Maegashira 8 in September 2009 but his final day victory over Masatsukasa kept him in the division. In the May 2010 tournament he was on the leaderboard early on after going 6-0 and then 8-2, although he finished on 10-5. This was his first top division winning record in double figures since January 2004. He maintained his top division position until he turned in a poor 2-13 record at Maegashira 11 in January 2011, which would have seen him demoted to juryo had the March 2011 tournament not been cancelled.

Unusually for the sumo world, he used his family name as his fighting name. For a short interim from July 2007 until January 2008 he changed his fighting name to the similar sounding Shimoōtori, but returned to using his family name after it brought no change in fortune.

== Retirement from sumo ==
Shimotori was one of 23 wrestlers found guilty of fixing the result of bouts after an investigation by the Japan Sumo Association, and he was forced to retire in April 2011. He also had to give up the rights to the elder name of Nishikijima which he would have used to stay in sumo as a coach.

== Fighting style ==
Shimotori was a yotsu-sumo wrestler, preferring grappling techniques and grabbing his opponent's mawashi or belt. His favourite grip was migi-yotsu, which is left hand outside, right hand inside his opponent's arms. His most common winning technique was yori-kiri, a straightforward force-out, which accounted for roughly half his wins.

== Career record ==
Shimotori Norio
Year	January Hatsu basho, Tokyo	March Haru basho, Osaka	May Natsu basho, Tokyo	July Nagoya basho, Nagoya	September Aki basho, Tokyo	November Kyūshū basho, Fukuoka
2000	x	x	Makushita tsukedashi #60; 5–2	West Makushita #43; 5–2	East Makushita #30; 5–2	East Makushita #15; 5–2
2001	East Makushita #9; 5–2	East Makushita #4; 6–1	East Jūryō #10; 8–7	East Jūryō #8; 6–9	West Jūryō #11; 11–4	West Jūryō #5; 8–7
2002	East Jūryō #3; 12–3–P	East Maegashira #12; 6–9	West Maegashira #14; 10–5	West Maegashira #8; 9–6; F★	East Maegashira #2; 5–10	West Maegashira #5; 7–8
2003	West Maegashira #7; 9–6	East Maegashira #3; 3–7–5	West Maegashira #11; 4–11	West Jūryō #2; 10–5	West Maegashira #12; 8–7	West Maegashira #9; 8–7
2004	East Maegashira #7; 11–4	West Komusubi #1; 6–9	East Maegashira #3; 7–8	East Maegashira #4; 9–6	East Maegashira #1; 5–10	East Maegashira #5; 4–11
2005	West Maegashira #9; 8–7	East Maegashira #8; 2–10–3	East Maegashira #17; 5–10	East Jūryō #4; 9–6	West Maegashira #17; 8–7	West Maegashira #14; Sat out due to injury 0–0–15
2006	East Jūryō #9; 7–8	West Jūryō #9; 9–6	West Jūryō #4; 7–8	East Jūryō #5; 10–5	West Maegashira #17; 7–8	West Jūryō #1; 6–9
2007	West Jūryō #3; 10–5–PPP	East Maegashira #15; 9–6	West Maegashira #10; Sat out due to injury 0–0–15	East Jūryō #5; 5–10	East Jūryō #9; 10–5	East Jūryō #4; 10–5
2008	West Maegashira #14; 1–1–13	West Jūryō #9; 7–8	West Jūryō #10; 8–7	East Jūryō #6; 9–6	East Jūryō #3; 8–7	East Jūryō #1; 7–8
2009	East Jūryō #2; 10–5	West Maegashira #14; 8–7	West Maegashira #10; 6–9	East Maegashira #14; 9–6	West Maegashira #8; 4–11	West Maegashira #15; 8–7
2010	West Maegashira #13; 8–7	West Maegashira #10; 5–10	West Maegashira #15; 10–5	East Maegashira #9; 6–9	West Maegashira #10; 8–7	West Maegashira #8; 6–9
2011	West Maegashira #11; 2–13	Tournament Cancelled; 0–0–0	West Jūryō #5; Retired –	x	x	x
Record given as wins–losses–absences Top division champion Top division runner-up Retired Lower divisions Non-participation Sanshō key: F=Fighting spirit; O=Outstanding performance; T=Technique Also shown: ★=Kinboshi; P=Playoff(s); Divisions: Makuuchi — Jūryō — Makushita — Sandanme — Jonidan — Jonokuchi Makuuchi ranks: Yokozuna — Ōzeki — Sekiwake — Komusubi — Maegashira

== See also ==
- Glossary of sumo terms
- List of past sumo wrestlers
- List of komusubi
