= Futen'ō Izumi =

Sumo wrestler

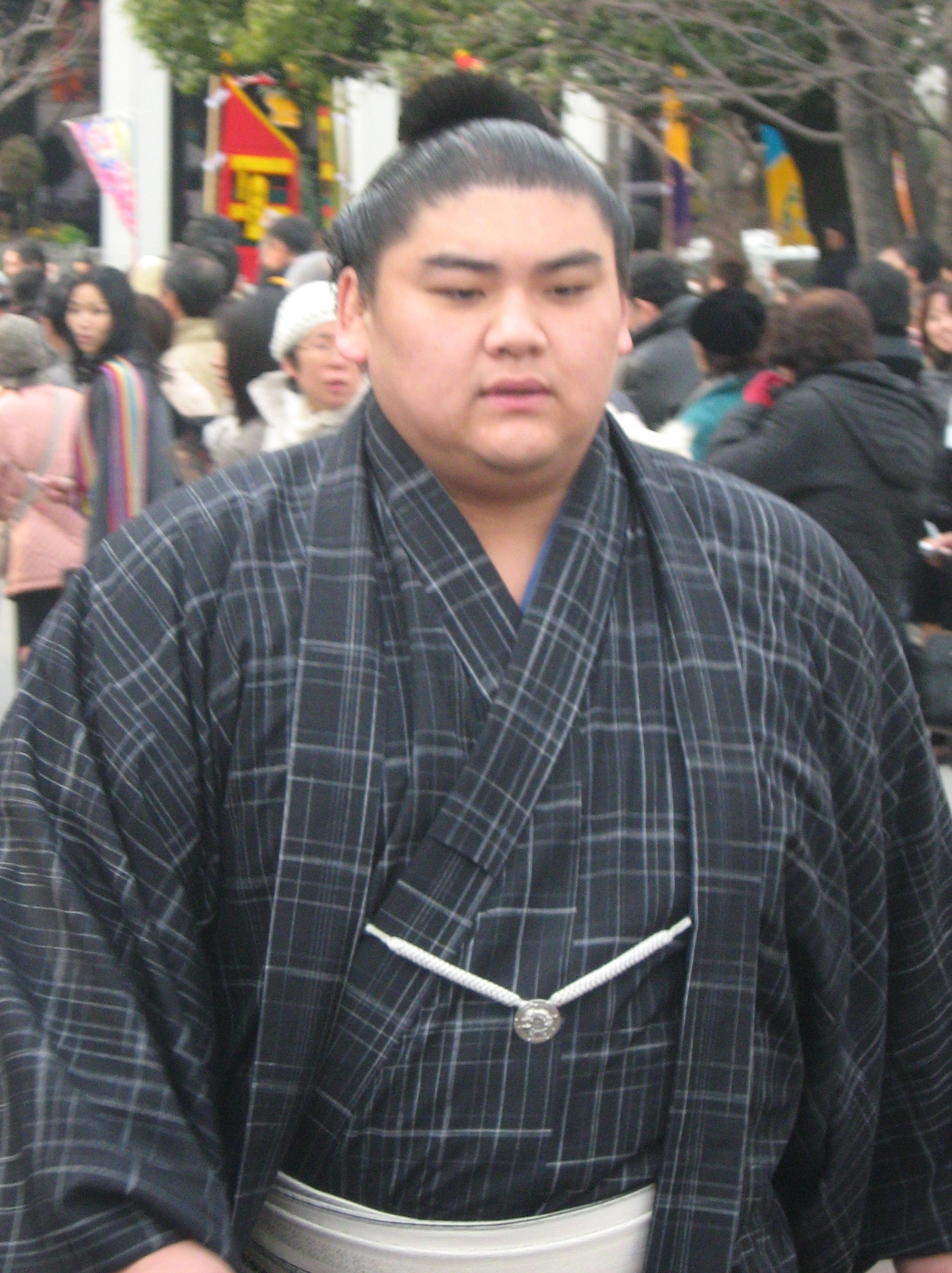

Personal information
- Native name: 普天王 水
- Born: Izumi Uchida; August 28, 1980 (age 46) Kumamoto, Japan
- Height: 1.80 m (5 ft 11 in)
- Weight: 150 kg (331 lb)
- Website: http://futenou.ameblo.jp/

Sport
- Sport: Sumo
- University team: Nihon University
- Retired: May, 2011
- Heya: Dewanoumi
- Record: 326-347-14
- Debut: January, 2003
- Highest rank: Komusubi (September 2005)
- Elder name: Inagawa
- Special Prizes: Fighting Spirit (1); Technique (1)

Futen'ō Izumi (born August 28, 1980, as Izumi Uchida in Tensui, Tamana District, Kumamoto, Japan), is a former sumo wrestler. A former amateur champion, he turned professional in 2003, reaching the top division the following year. He earned two special prizes. His highest rank was komusubi, which he held for one tournament. He retired in May 2011 after falling down the banzuke to the third makushita division. He is now a sumo coach.

== Early life and sumo background ==
He was born to a family of orange farmers. He had loved sumo since elementary school and had the full support of his parents in turning professional, although his father wished him to complete his education first. After finishing high school he went to Nihon University, where he gained the amateur equivalent of the yokozuna title, winning the All Japan Championship in 2000 and the Kokutai (Japan Games) in 2002.

== Career ==
Futen'ō entered professional sumo in January 2003. He joined Dewanoumi stable, one of the most prestigious heya in sumo. Its longstanding history was one of the reasons he chose that particular stable. Because of his amateur achievements he was given makushita tsukedashi status and so was allowed to leapfrog the lower divisions, beginning his career as a makushita (third division) wrestler at the rank of makushita 15. He was runner-up in his first tournament, only losing on a tie-break after a 6–1 result. He was promoted to jūryō after only two tournaments, and the makuuchi division five tournaments later, in March 2004.

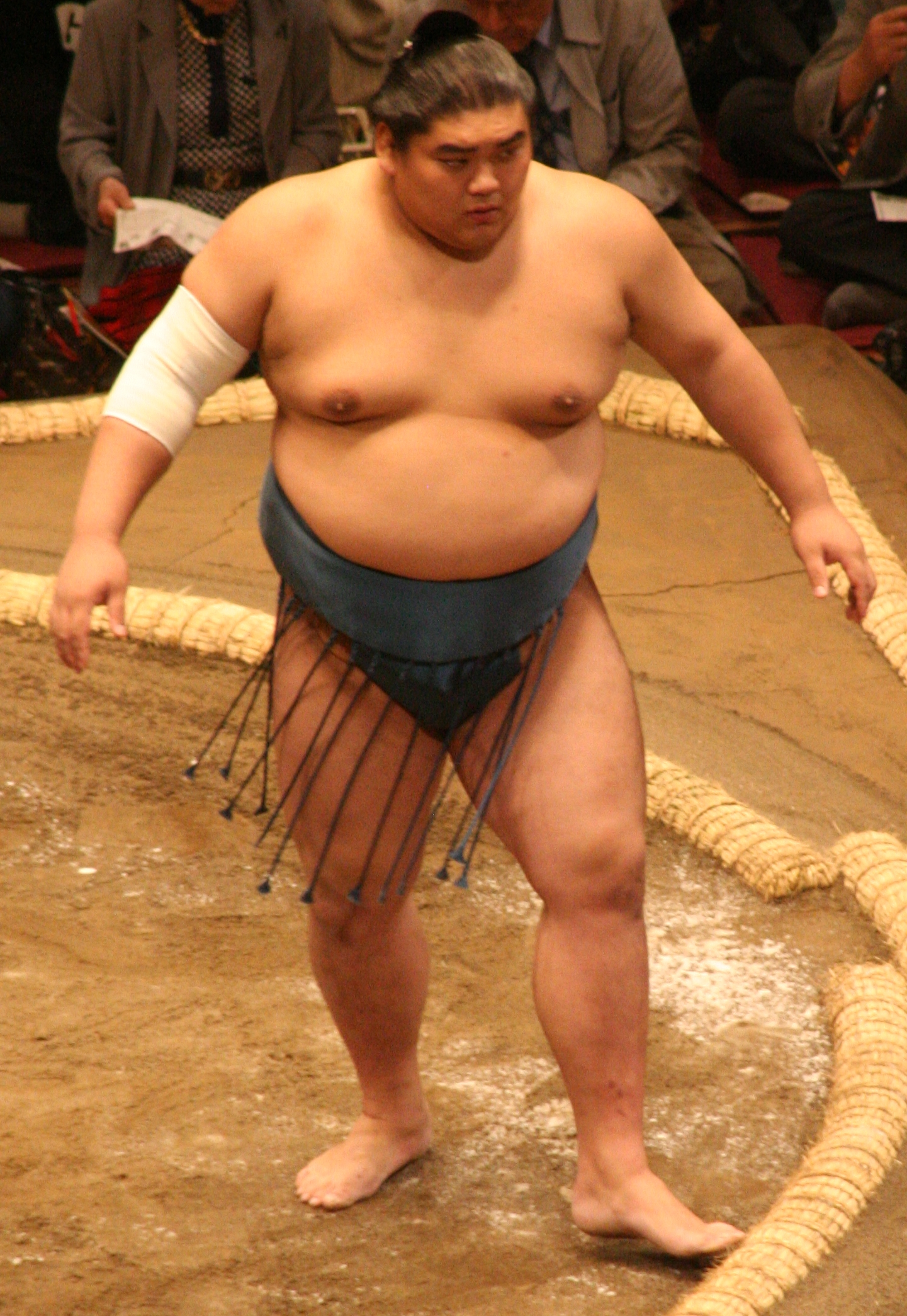
Futen'ō in May 2009

Futen'ō initially struggled in the top division, recording four make-koshi tournaments out of five before slipping back to the jūryō division in January 2005. He returned to the makuuchi division for the next tournament, however, and results of 11–4 and 10–5 in May and July saw him rewarded with two special prizes for Fighting Spirit and Technique and promotion to komusubi, his highest rank so far. Despite unexpectedly defeating yokozuna Asashōryū on the opening day of the September 2005 tournament (his only win against a yokozuna) he was unable to retain the rank, posting a 5–10 score. In the following tournament in November he tore ligaments in his right ankle, forcing him to withdraw from the tournament, and he never managed to return to komusubi.

A series of mixed results in 2007 left him a middle-ranked maegashira for most of the year. In 2008 he produced three consecutive kachi-koshi or winning scores, which returned him to the upper maegashira ranks for July, but he could win only three bouts there. In September 2008 an 11–4 record at maegashira 10 sent him up to maegashira 1, but he had six losing scores in the next six tournaments, and after the September 2009 basho he was demoted to jūryō for the first time in nearly five years.

He missed four days of the November 2009 tournament, producing only a 7-5-3 record, and a 4–11 score in January 2010 sent him towards the bottom of the jūryō division. He produced only 6–9 in May, his tenth consecutive losing score, and was demoted to makushita as a result. This left his Dewanoumi stable without any sekitori for the first time since 1898. To make matters even worse for him, he was suspended for the July 2010 tournament (along with about a dozen other wrestlers) after admitting involvement in illegal betting on baseball. By November 2010 he had fallen to Makushita 51, but he produced a winning record of 5–2 in that tournament, his first kachi-koshi in over two years.

His shikona, or sumo name of Futen'ō was adopted upon his first promotion to the jūryō division, and was thought up by his father. Coming from Tensui village, he had wanted to use the kanji "ten", so his father combined "futen", meaning "everything in the universe", with "teno", from a traditional story about a boy who works hard to protect a mountain. Taken together, Futen'ō regarded his fighting name as meaning "one who works hard on everything."

While ranked in the top division he was one of several top sumo wrestlers to keep a blog which he regularly updated even during tournaments, reviewing each of his wins and losses.

== Retirement from sumo ==
Futen'ō announced his retirement shortly before the May 2011 tournament, saying he found motivation hard after the cancellation of the previous tournament in Osaka due to a match-fixing scandal. He stayed in sumo as a coach under the elder name Inagawa Oyakata. In June 2014 he moved from Dewanoumi stable to Chiganoura stable. It had been thought that he would taker over the running of that stable when its head coach, former sekiwake Masudayama, reached the mandatory retirement age of 65 in April 2016, but the job went to the former komusubi Takamisugi instead. Inagawa left Chiganoura stable the following month and joined Kise stable to work as a coach there.

== Fighting style ==
Futen'ō had a straightforward fighting style, winning nearly 60 percent of his matches by yori-kiri or force out, the most common technique in sumo. His favourite grip on his opponent's mawashi was hidari-yotsu, a right hand outside, left hand inside position.

== Family ==
Futeno announced his engagement in April 2008, to a 27-year-old former nurse whom he met in Nagoya in 2005. They officially celebrated their union in August.

== Career record ==
Futen'ō Izumi
Year	January Hatsu basho, Tokyo	March Haru basho, Osaka	May Natsu basho, Tokyo	July Nagoya basho, Nagoya	September Aki basho, Tokyo	November Kyūshū basho, Fukuoka
2003	Makushita tsukedashi #15; 6–1–PP	West Makushita #4; 6–1	East Jūryō #11; 8–7	West Jūryō #6; 9–6	West Jūryō #4; 5–10	East Jūryō #7; 8–7
2004	West Jūryō #4; 10–5	East Maegashira #15; 7–8	West Maegashira #15; 7–8	West Maegashira #15; 10–5	East Maegashira #10; 4–11	East Maegashira #16; 7–8
2005	West Jūryō #1; 9–6	West Maegashira #13; 8–7	East Maegashira #10; 11–4; F	West Maegashira #3; 10–5; T	West Komusubi #1; 5–10	East Maegashira #2; 3–8–4
2006	West Maegashira #8; 9–6	East Maegashira #4; 6–9	East Maegashira #7; 9–6	East Maegashira #5; 6–9	East Maegashira #7; 9–6	West Maegashira #2; 5–10
2007	West Maegashira #7; 8–7	East Maegashira #4; 3–12	East Maegashira #13; 10–5	West Maegashira #7; 5–10	West Maegashira #11; 8–7	West Maegashira #9; 6–9
2008	East Maegashira #12; 8–7	East Maegashira #10; 10–5	East Maegashira #6; 9–6	East Maegashira #3; 3–12	West Maegashira #10; 11–4	West Maegashira #1; 5–10
2009	East Maegashira #5; 5–10	West Maegashira #9; 7–8	East Maegashira #10; 6–9	East Maegashira #13; 6–9	West Maegashira #15; 5–10	West Jūryō #2; 7–5–3
2010	East Jūryō #3; 4–11	West Jūryō #9; 6–9	West Jūryō #12; 6–9	East Makushita #2; Suspended; 0–0–7	West Makushita #42; 3–4	East Makushita #51; 5–2
2011	West Makushita #37; 3–4	Tournament Cancelled; 0–0–0	East Makushita #44; Retired –	x	x	x
Record given as wins–losses–absences Top division champion Top division runner-up Retired Lower divisions Non-participation Sanshō key: F=Fighting spirit; O=Outstanding performance; T=Technique Also shown: ★=Kinboshi; P=Playoff(s); Divisions: Makuuchi — Jūryō — Makushita — Sandanme — Jonidan — Jonokuchi Makuuchi ranks: Yokozuna — Ōzeki — Sekiwake — Komusubi — Maegashira

== See also ==
- Glossary of sumo terms
- List of past sumo wrestlers
- List of sumo elders
- List of komusubi
