= Wakanami Jun =

Japanese sumo wrestler (1941–2007)

Personal information
- Native name: 若浪 順
- Born: Jun Tomiyama; 1 March 1941 Ibaraki, Japan
- Died: 17 April 2007 (aged 66)
- Height: 1.78 m (5 ft 10 in)
- Weight: 103 kg (227 lb)

Sport
- Sport: Sumo
- Retired: March, 1972
- Heya: Tatsunami
- Record: 568-557-20
- Debut: March, 1957
- Highest rank: Komusubi (July, 1964)
- Elder name: Tamagaki
- Championships: 1 (Makuuchi); 1 (Jūryō); 2 (Makushita)
- Special Prizes: Fighting Spirit (2); Technique(2)
- Gold Stars: 3 Tochinoumi; Kashiwado; Kitanofuji
- Updated on June 2020

Wakanami Jun (born Jun Tomiyama, 1 March 1941 – 17 April 2007) was a sumo wrestler from Iwai, Ibaraki, Japan. His highest rank was komusubi. He won a top division tournament championship in March 1968. He was also a sumo coach.

== Career ==
He joined the Tatsunami stable in March 1957 and reached the top makuuchi division in May 1963. He was small, at just 178 cm and 103 kg, but he was very popular with sumo fans. In July 1964 he reached his highest rank of komusubi, which he was to hold on three occasions with a combined record of only 10 wins against 35 losses. He was runner-up to Kashiwado in the July 1967 tournament.

In March 1968, ranked as a maegashira, he won the championship (yūshō) in the top division with a 13–2 record, finishing ahead of ōzeki Yutakayama and Tamanoshima. Yokozuna Taihō was out through injury and Sadanoyama announced his retirement, and Wakanami did not have to face anyone ranked higher than sekiwake during the tournament. It was not a popular victory, as the public had wanted the well-liked Yutakayama to finally win his first yūshō (which he never managed to achieve), and it led to demands that low ranking maegashira challenging for the yūshō be matched against all the other contenders in the crucial final days of the tournament, now a standard practice. He was promoted to komusubi for the following tournament but could manage only two wins there.

He fought in the makuuchi division for 52 tournaments in total. He won four special prizes, two for Fighting Spirit and two for Technique. He earned three kinboshi or gold stars for defeating yokozuna. He fell briefly to the jūryō division in 1969 and won the second division championship, becoming the first wrestler to do this after winning the top division championship. He retired in March 1972.

== Fighting style ==
Although small by sumo standards, Wakanami was very strong in his arms and back, and liked to try tsuri (lifts) even on very heavy opponents like Takamiyama. He was also known for his agility, and his ability to spin on the edge of the dohyō. During his tournament victory he won five of his matches by utchari (ring edge throw). One of his chief rivals was sekiwake Myōbudani with whom he had several spirited matches.

== Retirement from sumo ==
He stayed in the sumo world after retirement as a coach at his stable, and was known as Onaruto and then Tamagaki Oyakata. Wakanami left the Sumo Association upon reaching the mandatory retirement age of 65 in March 2006, although he had been hospitalized since December 2004 after suffering a cerebral hemorrhage. His nephew was also a sumo wrestler in the Tatsunami stable, and reached a highest rank of makushita 2 before retiring in March 2010. He was known as Wakainami for most of his career, but was told he could drop the "i" and use his uncle's shikona if he reached the jūryō division. He never did, but after visiting his uncle in hospital in September 2005, was given permission to use the Wakanami shikona before his uncle retired.

Wakanami died in a Tokyo hospital following complications from pneumonia on 17 April 2007.

== Career record ==
- The Nagoya tournament was first held in 1958.

Wakanami Jun
Year	January Hatsu basho, Tokyo	March Haru basho, Osaka	May Natsu basho, Tokyo	July Nagoya basho, Nagoya	September Aki basho, Tokyo	November Kyūshū basho, Fukuoka
1957	x	(Maezumo)	East Jonokuchi #15; 6–2	Not held	West Jonidan #79; 4–4	East Jonidan #71; 6–2
1958	West Jonidan #34; 5–3	East Jonidan #16; 3–5	East Jonidan #22; 7–1	West Sandanme #83; 5–3	East Sandanme #68; 5–3	East Sandanme #52; 6–2
1959	West Sandanme #32; 5–3	East Sandanme #19; 6–2	West Makushita #83; 5–3	East Makushita #67; 5–3	East Makushita #63; 6–2	West Makushita #44; 6–2
1960	East Makushita #33; 5–3	West Makushita #26; 6–2	West Makushita #15; 5–3	East Makushita #7; 4–3	West Makushita #5; 4–3	East Makushita #4; 3–4
1961	West Makushita #5; 7–0–P; Champion	West Jūryō #16; 9–6	East Jūryō #11; 8–6–1	East Jūryō #10; Sat out due to injury 0–0–15	East Makushita #4; 0–3–4	East Makushita #27; 5–2
1962	West Makushita #16; 4–3	West Makushita #14; 7–0–P; Champion	West Jūryō #16; 9–6	West Jūryō #6; 8–7	East Jūryō #5; 9–6	West Jūryō #2; 5–10
1963	East Jūryō #7; 8–7	East Jūryō #5; 12–3–P	West Maegashira #13; 9–6	East Maegashira #9; 10–5; F	West Maegashira #1; 5–10	East Maegashira #6; 7–8
1964	East Maegashira #7; 7–8	West Maegashira #7; 7–8	West Maegashira #8; 11–4; F	West Komusubi #1; 5–10	East Maegashira #3; 3–12 ★	East Maegashira #11; 8–7
1965	East Maegashira #7; 6–9	West Maegashira #9; 5–10	West Maegashira #13; 8–7	East Maegashira #10; 7–8	West Maegashira #11; 8–7	East Maegashira #8; 6–9
1966	East Maegashira #13; 10–5	East Maegashira #7; 5–10	West Maegashira #13; 7–8	East Maegashira #14; 8–7	East Maegashira #10; 8–7	West Maegashira #5; 4–11
1967	East Maegashira #12; 10–5	East Maegashira #5; 9–6	East Maegashira #2; 2–13	East Maegashira #6; 11–4; T	East Maegashira #1; 6–9	West Maegashira #3; 4–11
1968	West Maegashira #9; 8–7	East Maegashira #8; 13–2; T	East Komusubi #1; 2–13	West Maegashira #4; 7–8	West Maegashira #5; 9–6	West Maegashira #3; 4–11
1969	West Maegashira #8; 5–10	West Maegashira #11; 6–9	East Maegashira #13; 6–9	East Jūryō #4; 7–8	West Jūryō #5; 12–3; Champion	West Maegashira #11; 8–7
1970	West Maegashira #7; 7–8	East Maegashira #8; 7–8	East Maegashira #11; 9–6	West Maegashira #4; 4–11 ★	East Maegashira #8; 8–7	East Maegashira #3; 5–10
1971	East Maegashira #5; 10–5	West Komusubi; 3–12	West Maegashira #5; 9–6	West Maegashira #1; 3–12	West Maegashira #9; 7–8	East Maegashira #11; 8–7
1972	East Maegashira #6; 5–10	West Maegashira #10; Retired; 2–13	x	x	x	x
Record given as wins–losses–absences Top division champion Top division runner-up Retired Lower divisions Non-participation Sanshō key: F=Fighting spirit; O=Outstanding performance; T=Technique Also shown: ★=Kinboshi; P=Playoff(s); Divisions: Makuuchi — Jūryō — Makushita — Sandanme — Jonidan — Jonokuchi Makuuchi ranks: Yokozuna — Ōzeki — Sekiwake — Komusubi — Maegashira

== See also ==
- Glossary of sumo terms
- List of sumo tournament top division champions
- List of sumo tournament top division runners-up
- List of sumo tournament second division champions
- List of past sumo wrestlers
- List of komusubi
