= Yutakayama Hiromitsu =

Japanese sumo wrestler (1947–2020)

Personal information
- Native name: 豊山広光
- Born: Hiromitsu Nagahama; 22 October 1947 Shibata, Niigata, Japan
- Died: 19 September 2020 (aged 72)
- Height: 1.85 m (6 ft 1 in)
- Weight: 127 kg (280 lb)

Sport
- Sport: Sumo
- Retired: May, 1981
- Heya: Tokitsukaze
- Record: 491-505
- Debut: March, 1970
- Highest rank: Komusubi (September, 1972)
- Elder name: Minato
- Championships: 2 (Jūryō); 2 (Makushita)
- Special Prizes: Outstanding Performance (1); Fighting Spirit (2)
- Gold Stars: 8 Wajima (4); Kitanofuji (2); Kotozakura (2)
- Updated on September 2020

Yutakayama Hiromitsu (豊山広光; (22 October 1947 – 19 September 2020), born Hiromitsu Nagahama (長濱廣光, Nagahama Hiromitsu)) was a sumo wrestler from Shibata, Niigata, Japan. A former amateur champion, he turned professional in 1970. His highest rank was komusubi. He wrestled for Tokitsukaze stable and took his shikona or fighting name from the head coach who recruited him, former ozeki Yutakayama Katsuo. After his retirement in 1981 he became an elder of the Japan Sumo Association, and founded the Minato stable which he led from 1982 until 2010. He died of pancreatic cancer in 2020.

== Career ==
He began sumo from a young age and became a high school yokozuna. After graduating in 1966, he became an amateur champion at Tonodai University. He came from a poor family of farmers, and having to work to support himself as well as study, he had less time for training and did not win as many amateur titles as his rival at the time, Nihon University's Wajima Hiroshi. He had plans to become a teacher, but was persuaded to join the professional sport in March 1970, debuting in the third highest makushita division. His head coach at Tokitsukaze stable was ex-ōzeki Yutakayama Katsuo, also from Tonodai University. Wajima had joined professional sumo one tournament earlier, and such was the interest in their rivalry that when the two met in the jūryō division during the November 1970 tournament, sponsors placed kensho money on the bout, which normally is only allowed in the top division.

He initially fought under his own surname of Nagahama, and continued to use it upon reaching the top division in November 1971, but in July 1972 he persuaded his stablemaster to let him use his old shikona of Yutakayama. He fought in the top division for 51 tournaments, earning three special prizes and eight gold stars for defeating yokozuna, including four from Wajima, his rival from his amateur days. He first reached the sanyaku ranks in September 1972 when he was promoted to komusubi. Although he was to hold the rank on two further occasions, he never managed a winning record there. Despite his success against several yokozuna he was never able to defeat Kitanoumi in the top division, losing to him 21 times in 21 matches. He also had a poor record against ozeki Takanohana, beating him only once in 22 matches.

He did not miss a single bout in his career, fighting 996 consecutive matches. This is the second longest streak for former collegiate competitors, after Asanowaka's 1145.

== Retirement from sumo ==
He retired in May 1981 and became an elder of the Japan Sumo Association under the name Minato Oyakata. He founded Minato stable in 1982 and remained head coach there until 2010, when he passed control of the stable over to former maegashira Minatofuji, and took the name Tatsutagawa. He was also a Deputy Director of the Sumo Association. He reached the mandatory retirement age for elders of 65 in October 2012.

== Fighting style ==
Yutakayama was a yotsu-sumo specialist who liked to fight on the mawashi or belt and his most common winning kimarite were yori-kiri (force out), tsuri-dashi (lift out) and uwatenage (overarm throw).

== Personal life and death ==
He was married with two daughters. His stablemaster did not allow him to get married until he reached the jūryō division in September 1970. The wedding reception took place in October 1971.

He died of pancreatic cancer on 19 September 2020 at the age of 72.

== Career record ==
Yutakayama Hiromitsu
Year	January Hatsu basho, Tokyo	March Haru basho, Osaka	May Natsu basho, Tokyo	July Nagoya basho, Nagoya	September Aki basho, Tokyo	November Kyūshū basho, Fukuoka
1970	x	Makushita tsukedashi #59; 5–2	West Makushita #42; 7–0; Champion	East Makushita #3; 7–0–P; Champion	West Jūryō #9; 9–6	West Jūryō #5; 11–4; Champion
1971	West Jūryō #1; 5–10	West Jūryō #8; 12–3–P; Champion	East Jūryō #2; 9–6	East Jūryō #2; 6–9	West Jūryō #5; 10–5	East Maegashira #13; 6–9
1972	West Jūryō #2; 9–6	East Maegashira #11; 10–5	West Maegashira #1; 8–7 ★	East Maegashira #1; 10–5	East Komusubi #1; 5–10	East Maegashira #3; 6–9
1973	West Maegashira #7; 8–7	West Maegashira #4; 4–11	East Maegashira #11; 9–6	West Maegashira #5; 9–6	West Komusubi #1; 7–8	East Maegashira #2; 4–11 ★
1974	East Maegashira #7; 9–6	West Maegashira #2; 7–8 ★	West Maegashira #3; 11–4; F★★	West Komusubi #1; 7–8	West Maegashira #1; 5–10	West Maegashira #7; 7–8
1975	West Maegashira #8; 8–7	East Maegashira #7; 9–6	West Maegashira #2; 4–11	West Maegashira #9; 9–6	West Maegashira #3; 4–11	West Maegashira #10; 11–4
1976	East Maegashira #2; 5–10	West Maegashira #7; 8–7	West Maegashira #2; 6–9	East Maegashira #5; 8–7	East Maegashira #2; 6–9	East Maegashira #6; 8–7
1977	East Maegashira #3; 4–11	Maegashira; 9–6	West Maegashira #6; 8–7	East Maegashira #3; 6–9	West Maegashira #6; 10–5; F★	East Komusubi #1; 4–11
1978	East Maegashira #5; 9–6; O★	East Maegashira #1; 5–10	West Maegashira #5; 4–11	East Maegashira #13; 4–11	West Jūryō #7; 10–5	West Jūryō #3; 11–4
1979	East Maegashira #11; 5–10	West Jūryō #1; 10–5	East Maegashira #12; 8–7	East Maegashira #11; 8–7	West Maegashira #5; 3–12	East Maegashira #13; 10–5
1980	East Maegashira #3; 5–10 ★	West Maegashira #8; 6–9	East Maegashira #12; 8–7	East Maegashira #9; 8–7	East Maegashira #8; 7–8	West Maegashira #8; 3–12
1981	East Jūryō #4; 6–9	West Jūryō #8; 7–8	East Jūryō #9; Retired; 5–10	x	x	x
Record given as wins–losses–absences Top division champion Top division runner-up Retired Lower divisions Non-participation Sanshō key: F=Fighting spirit; O=Outstanding performance; T=Technique Also shown: ★=Kinboshi; P=Playoff(s); Divisions: Makuuchi — Jūryō — Makushita — Sandanme — Jonidan — Jonokuchi Makuuchi ranks: Yokozuna — Ōzeki — Sekiwake — Komusubi — Maegashira

== See also ==
- Glossary of sumo terms
- List of sumo tournament second division champions
- List of past sumo wrestlers
- List of komusubi
