= Japanese destroyer Tokitsukaze =

At least two warships of Japan have borne the name Tokitsukaze:

- Japanese destroyer Tokitsukaze (1916), an Imperial Japanese Navy Isokaze-class destroyer launched in 1916 and stricken in 1935
- Japanese destroyer Tokitsukaze (1939), an Imperial Japanese Navy Kagerō-class destroyer launched in 1939 and sunk in 1943
