= Futatsuryū Jun'ichi =

Japanese sumo wrestler

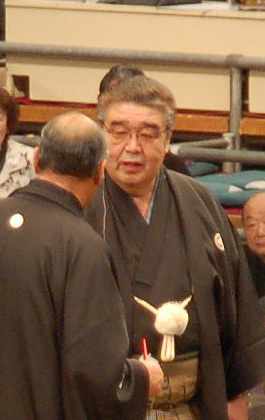

Personal information
- Native name: 双津竜 順一
- Born: Yamamoto Jun'ichi; February 28, 1950 Hokkaidō, Japan
- Died: August 12, 2014 (aged 64) Tokyo, Japan
- Height: 1.85 m (6 ft 1 in)
- Weight: 172 kg (379 lb)

Sport
- Sport: Sumo
- Retired: November, 1982
- Heya: Tokitsukaze
- Record: 676-669-30
- Debut: September, 1963
- Highest rank: Komusubi (July, 1979)
- Elder name: Tokitsukaze
- Championships: 2 (Jūryō); 1 (Makushita)
- Updated on June 2020

Futatsuryū Jun'ichi (双津竜 順一, born Jun'ichi Yamamoto; February 28, 1950 – August 12, 2014) was a sumo wrestler from Hokkaidō, Japan. After retirement he became the head coach of Tokitsukaze stable. Following his involvement in the hazing and death of trainee Takashi Saito, in October 2007 he became the first serving stablemaster to be dismissed by the Japan Sumo Association. In May 2009 he was sentenced to six years in prison. He died on August 12, 2014, of lung cancer.

== Career ==
Born in Muroran, he made his professional debut in September 1963, at just 13 years of age. He reached the second highest jūryō division six years later in November 1969, after winning the third highest makushita division championship with a perfect 7-0 record from the rank of makushita 20 (before the rules were changed to make makushita 15 the lowest rank for juryo promotion in 1977). He made his debut in the top makuuchi division in March 1972 but was demoted back to the second division a number of times. He was ranked in the top division for 29 tournaments in total, peaking at komusubi rank in July 1979. This promotion was due to some banzuke luck as he had been ranked only at maegashira 7 in the previous tournament, but there were few other viable promotion candidates. He scored 4-11 in his komusubi debut, which was to be his only tournament in the sanyaku ranks. He was one of the heavier wrestlers in his time. His last top division tournament was in March 1980, but he continued to fight despite falling greatly in rank. He finished his career back in the makushita division.

== Retirement from sumo ==
He retired from active competition in November 1982, becoming an elder of the Sumo Association under the name Nishikijima. After nearly twenty years working as an assistant coach at his old heya, he became head of the stable when former ōzeki Yutakayama reached the mandatory retirement age in August 2002, and adopted the Tokitsukaze name. He oversaw the promotion of Tokitenkū and Toyonoshima to the top division in July and September 2004. In May 2007 he criticised Asashōryū for injuring Toyonoshima during training, and visited his wrestler in the hospital. He also served as a judge during tournament matches.

== Dismissal and trial ==
It was reported on October 3, 2007, that he would be dismissed from the Sumo Association over his involvement in hazing which contributed to the death of a young recruit at Tokitsukaze stable. Junior wrestler Tokitaizan, real name Takashi Saitō, collapsed and died in June after an intense training session called butsukari-geiko which reportedly lasted 30 minutes instead of the usual five. His death was originally put down to natural causes, but after Tokitsukaze pressed for a quick cremation the young wrestler's family insisted on an autopsy, which revealed the extent of his injuries. Tokitsukaze admitted to police that the day before Tokitaizan's death he had hit him across the forehead with a beer bottle and allowed other wrestlers in the stable to strike Tokitaizan with a metal baseball bat. It was also reported that Tokitsukaze failed to give Tokitaizan any aid and delayed calling an ambulance. On October 5, the Sumo Association announced his dismissal. They commented, "His actions were unbecoming as a stablemaster, he's outraged the public, and he's defiled the name of the Sumo Association." He was the first serving stablemaster to be dismissed from sumo (Yamahibiki Oyakata, the former komusubi Maenoshin had been dismissed in January 1997, but was an assistant coach and not a head coach).

On February 7, 2008, he and three sumo wrestlers were arrested for accidental mortality. Yamamoto admitted for the first time that Tokitaizan was tied to a pole and beaten for up to 20 minutes. He continued to deny the charges against him however, saying "it was not assault, it was discipline." On December 18, 2008, three sumo wrestlers were found guilty but received suspended sentences because they could not fight Yamamoto's commandment. They were all dismissed from sumo. Yamamoto's trial was conducted separately because he had continued to deny the charges, and began in February 2009.

On May 29, 2009, he was imprisoned for six years. The Nagoya District Court found that he had "overwhelming authority" over the three wrestlers who he had ordered to carry out the beating, even though he had not directly taken part himself. He immediately appealed the ruling and was released on bail. He then reportedly requested severance pay from the Sumo Association in the region of 20 million yen (200,000 USD). The two sides reached an out-of-court settlement in January 2010, the details of which were not disclosed. In July 2011 he gave an interview in which he claimed to be involved in yaocho or match-fixing at least ten times in his career, but insisted he was "framed" over Tokitaizan's death. His final appeal was rejected in August 2011 and a five-year prison term was finalized.

== Death ==
He died of lung cancer on August 12, 2014, at the age of 64. He had still been serving a sentence but was moved to a hospital as his condition deteriorated.

== Career record ==
Futatsuryū Jun'ichi
Year	January Hatsu basho, Tokyo	March Haru basho, Osaka	May Natsu basho, Tokyo	July Nagoya basho, Nagoya	September Aki basho, Tokyo	November Kyūshū basho, Fukuoka
1963	x	x	x	x	(Maezumo)	(Maezumo)
1964	(Maezumo)	West Jonokuchi #23; 2–5	West Jonokuchi #8; 4–3	East Jonidan #97; 3–4	East Jonidan #108; 4–3	East Jonidan #75; 5–2
1965	East Jonidan #26; 2–5	West Jonidan #54; 5–2	West Jonidan #19; 4–3	East Sandanme #83; 4–3	East Sandanme #67; 4–3	West Sandanme #44; 3–4
1966	East Sandanme #56; 2–5	West Sandanme #75; 5–2	East Sandanme #41; 4–3	East Sandanme #20; 5–2	West Makushita #82; 3–4	East Makushita #93; 4–3
1967	West Makushita #81; 4–3	West Makushita #67; 4–3	West Sandanme #6; 4–3	West Makushita #54; 5–2	West Makushita #35; 2–5	East Makushita #44; 2–5
1968	East Makushita #58; 3–4	West Sandanme #8; 6–1	West Makushita #42; 6–1	West Makushita #25; 4–3	West Makushita #20; 4–3	West Makushita #14; 3–4
1969	East Makushita #17; 2–5	East Makushita #33; 5–2	East Makushita #18; 5–2	East Makushita #9; 2–5	East Makushita #20; 7–0; Champion	West Jūryō #13; 10–5
1970	East Jūryō #7; 8–7	West Jūryō #4; 8–7	West Jūryō #2; 5–10	West Jūryō #9; 9–6	East Jūryō #5; 6–9	West Jūryō #9; 9–6
1971	West Jūryō #3; 6–9	East Jūryō #10; 12–3–P	East Jūryō #4; 6–9	East Jūryō #6; 7–8	East Jūryō #7; 8–7	West Jūryō #3; 9–6
1972	East Jūryō #1; 10–5	East Maegashira #9; 8–7	East Maegashira #4; 6–9	West Maegashira #6; 7–8	West Maegashira #8; 7–8	East Maegashira #11; 4–11
1973	East Jūryō #4; 6–9	East Jūryō #10; 9–6	West Jūryō #4; 9–6	West Jūryō #1; 9–6	East Maegashira #12; 7–8	East Jūryō #2; 5–10
1974	West Jūryō #7; 8–7	West Jūryō #3; 9–6	East Jūryō #1; 5–10	East Jūryō #10; 9–6	West Jūryō #2; 7–8	East Jūryō #5; 6–9
1975	East Jūryō #10; 8–7	East Jūryō #9; 8–7	West Jūryō #7; 11–4; Champion	West Maegashira #13; 4–11	West Jūryō #5; 8–7	East Jūryō #3; 12–3; Champion
1976	East Maegashira #11; 11–4	East Maegashira #3; 4–11	West Maegashira #9; 8–7	East Maegashira #7; 8–7	East Maegashira #5; 4–11	West Maegashira #10; Sat out due to injury 0–0–15
1977	West Jūryō #9; 8–7	West Jūryō #7; 8–7	East Jūryō #6; 8–7	East Jūryō #4; 10–5	East Maegashira #12; 9–6	East Maegashira #7; 9–6
1978	East Maegashira #3; 4–11	East Maegashira #9; 9–6	East Maegashira #4; 4–11	West Maegashira #11; 8–7	West Maegashira #8; 9–6	East Maegashira #4; 5–10
1979	East Maegashira #9; 7–8	West Maegashira #10; 8–7	East Maegashira #7; 10–5	East Komusubi #1; 4–11	West Maegashira #7; 8–7	West Maegashira #4; 5–10
1980	West Maegashira #8; 6–9	East Maegashira #13; 3–4–8	West Jūryō #9; 9–6	East Jūryō #6; 7–8	East Jūryō #8; 5–10	East Jūryō #12; 8–7
1981	West Jūryō #7; 6–9	West Jūryō #11; 9–6	West Jūryō #5; 4–11	West Jūryō #10; 9–6	East Jūryō #7; 6–9	West Jūryō #12; 4–11
1982	East Makushita #7; 3–4	West Makushita #12; 4–3	West Makushita #8; 3–4	West Makushita #15; Sat out due to injury 0–0–7	East Makushita #50; 5–2	West Makushita #32; Retired; 1–6
Record given as wins–losses–absences Top division champion Top division runner-up Retired Lower divisions Non-participation Sanshō key: F=Fighting spirit; O=Outstanding performance; T=Technique Also shown: ★=Kinboshi; P=Playoff(s); Divisions: Makuuchi — Jūryō — Makushita — Sandanme — Jonidan — Jonokuchi Makuuchi ranks: Yokozuna — Ōzeki — Sekiwake — Komusubi — Maegashira

== See also ==
- Glossary of sumo terms
- List of sumo tournament second division champions
- List of past sumo wrestlers
- Tokitsukaze stable
- List of komusubi
