= Yutakayama Katsuo =

Japanese sumo wrestler

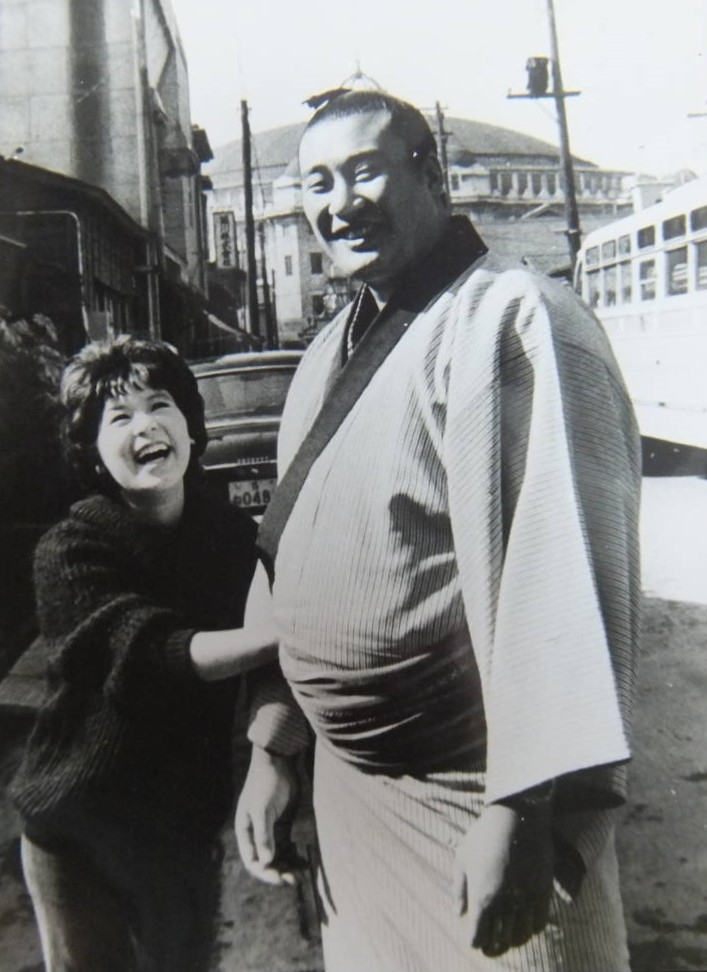
- Yutakayama (right) and Mieko Hirota in 1963

Personal information
- Native name: 豊山 勝男
- Born: Katsuo Uchida; 18 August 1937 (age 89) Niigata, Japan
- Height: 1.89 m (6 ft 2 1/2 in)
- Weight: 137 kg (302 lb)

Sport
- Sport: Sumo
- Retired: September, 1968
- Heya: Tokitsukaze
- Record: 413–245–8
- Debut: March, 1961
- Highest rank: Ōzeki (March, 1963)
- Elder name: Nishikijima
- Championships: 1 (Jūryō)
- Special Prizes: Fighting Spirit (4); Outstanding Performance (3)
- Gold Stars: 1 (Kashiwado)
- Updated on June 2020

Yutakayama Katsuo (born 18 August 1937 as Katsuo Uchida) is a former sumo wrestler from Niigata, Japan. His highest rank was ōzeki. Although he never won a top division tournament championship he was a runner-up on eight occasions. Before wrestling professionally he was an amateur champion at Tonodai University and he was the first former collegiate competitor to reach the ōzeki rank. After retirement he was head coach of the Tokitsukaze stable. From 1998 until 2002 he was the chairman (rijichō) of the Japan Sumo Association.

== Career ==
Born in Shibata, he attended the Tokyo University of Agriculture, and in amateur sumo earned the Collegiate Yokozuna title. He made his professional debut at the age of 23 in May 1961, joining Tokitsukaze stable, run by the former yokozuna great Futabayama. Due to his amateur achievements he was given makushita tsukedashi status and began in the third makushita division, fighting under his real name of Uchida. He reached the second jūryō division in three tournaments and after winning the jūryō division yūshō or championship with a perfect 15–0 score in November 1961 he was promoted to the top makuuchi division.

He adopted the shikona of Yutakayama upon his entry to the top division in January 1962 and was a runner-up to yokozuna Taihō in his debut tournament with a score of 12–3, also receiving the Fighting Spirit prize. He made komusubi rank in May 1962 but fell just short with seven wins. However, after a fine 12–3 score in September he was elevated straight to sekiwake and two more runner-up performances (to Taiho once again) saw him promoted to the second highest rank of ōzeki. The 37 wins he had in the three tournaments prior to his promotion was the strongest record for an ōzeki candidate since the six tournaments a year system began in 1958 (it has since been equaled by Hokuten'yū, Wakanohana III and Tochinoshin).

Yutakayama remained at ōzeki for the rest of his career, and was ranked there for 34 tournaments, eighth on the all-time list. He was runner-up on five more occasions, but never won a top division championship. He was perhaps unlucky to be fighting in the same era as the dominant Taihō, whom he was able to beat only four times in 32 meetings. There were a number of other strong yokozuna around as well, such as Sadanoyama and Kashiwado, with whom he also had a poor head-to-head record. After finishing as runner-up to Wakanami in March 1968 and Tamanoshima in May, he then had two make-koshi (losing scores) in a row, managing only a poor 4–11 record in September. He announced his retirement at the end of that tournament at the age of 31.

== Retirement from sumo ==
Yutakayama remained in the sumo world as an elder, initially under the name of Nishikijima. When his stablemaster Futabayama died a few months later in December 1968, a previous yokozuna from the stable, Kagamisato, briefly took charge, but Yutakayama was asked by Futabayama's widow to assume control instead. Kagamisato left to found another stable and Yutakayama took on the Tokitsukaze name in 1969. Over the years he produced a number of top division wrestlers such as Kurama, Ōshio, Ōyutaka, Yutakayama Hiromitsu, Tokitsunada, Aogiyama and Tokitsuumi. In February 1998 he successfully challenged Sakaigawa (the former Sadanoyama) for the chairmanship of the Japan Sumo Association, coming first in the ballot ahead of Kitanoumi. He remained in charge until February 2002. Later that year he handed control of Tokitsukaze stable over to former komusubi Futatsuryū and left the Sumo Association upon reaching the mandatory retirement age of 65.

== Fighting style ==
Yutakayama's favoured techniques were migi-yotsu (a left hand outside, right hand inside grip on his opponent's mawashi) and uwatenage (overarm throw). His most common winning kimarite in his career were yori kiri (force out) and tsuri dashi (lift out).

== Career record ==
Yutakayama Katsuo
Year	January Hatsu basho, Tokyo	March Haru basho, Osaka	May Natsu basho, Tokyo	July Nagoya basho, Nagoya	September Aki basho, Tokyo	November Kyūshū basho, Fukuoka
1961	x	East Makushita tsukedashi #10; 5–2	East Makushita #7; 5–2	East Makushita #1; 6–1	West Jūryō #14; 9–6	West Jūryō #7; 15–0; Champion
1962	East Maegashira #9; 12–3; F	East Maegashira #3; 9–6	West Komusubi #2; 7–8	West Maegashira #1; 7–8 ★	West Maegashira #2; 12–3; OF	East Sekiwake #1; 12–3; OF
1963	East Sekiwake #1; 13–2; OF	West Ōzeki #1; 7–8	West Ōzeki #2; 13–2	East Ōzeki #1; 10–5	West Ōzeki #2; 13–2	East Ōzeki #1; 9–6
1964	West Ōzeki #1; 8–7	West Ōzeki #2; 10–5	West Ōzeki #1; 9–6	West Ōzeki #2; 13–2	East Ōzeki #1; 11–4	West Ōzeki #1; 10–5
1965	West Ōzeki #1; 9–6	West Ōzeki #1; 11–4	East Ōzeki #1; 11–4	East Ōzeki #1; 10–5	East Ōzeki #1; 5–10	East Ōzeki #2; 8–7
1966	East Ōzeki #1; 10–5	East Ōzeki #1; 10–5	East Ōzeki #1; 9–6	East Ōzeki #1; 8–7	East Ōzeki #1; 7–8	East Ōzeki #2; 9–6
1967	East Ōzeki #2; 9–6	East Ōzeki #2; 5–10	West Ōzeki #2; 1–6–8	West Ōzeki #2; 10–5	East Ōzeki #1; 6–9	West Ōzeki #2; 10–5
1968	West Ōzeki #1; 7–8	West Ōzeki #2; 12–3	West Ōzeki #1; 10–5	West Ōzeki #1; 7–8	West Ōzeki #2; Retired; 4–11	x
Record given as wins–losses–absences Top division champion Top division runner-up Retired Lower divisions Non-participation Sanshō key: F=Fighting spirit; O=Outstanding performance; T=Technique Also shown: ★=Kinboshi; P=Playoff(s); Divisions: Makuuchi — Jūryō — Makushita — Sandanme — Jonidan — Jonokuchi Makuuchi ranks: Yokozuna — Ōzeki — Sekiwake — Komusubi — Maegashira

== See also ==
- Glossary of sumo terms
- List of sumo tournament top division runners-up
- List of sumo tournament second division champions
- List of past sumo wrestlers
- List of ōzeki

Sporting positions
Preceded by Sadanoyama Shinmatsu	Chairman of the Japan Sumo Association; 1998–2002	Succeeded by Kitanoumi Toshimitsu
