= Tokitsukaze stable =

Organization of sumo wrestlers

Coordinates: 35.6938°N 139.7945°E

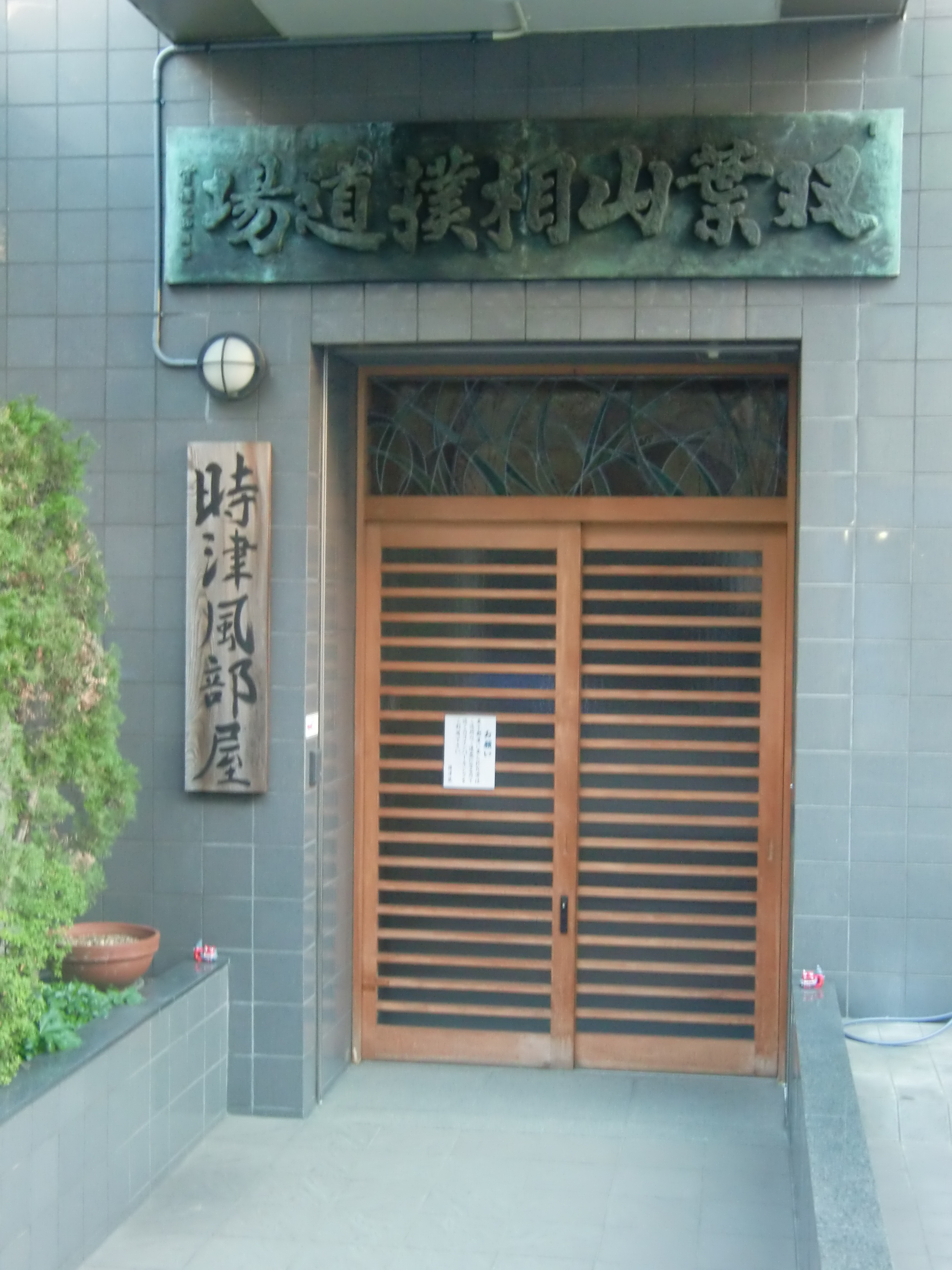
Entrance to Tokitsukaze Stable

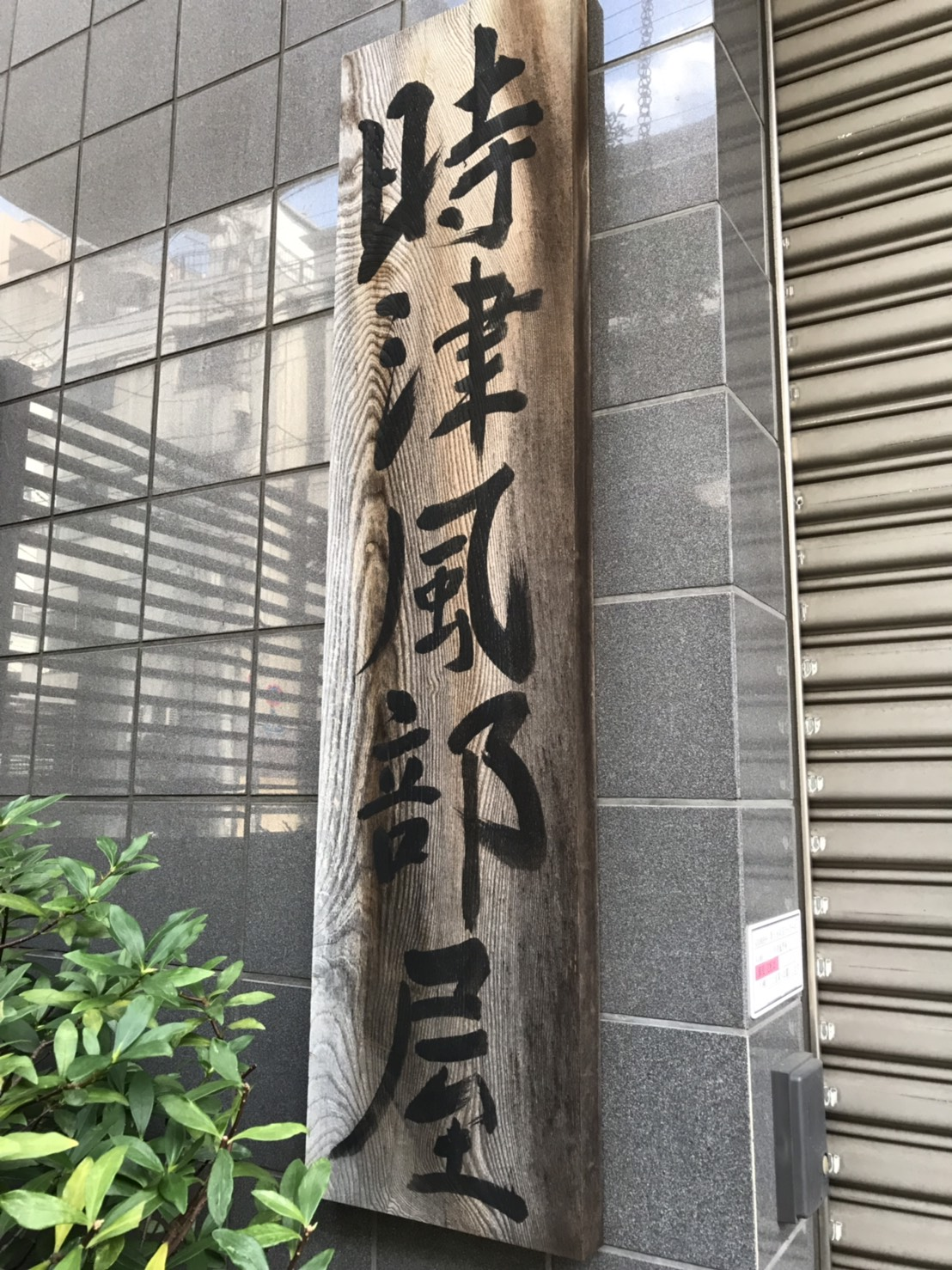

The Tokitsukaze stable (時津風部屋, Tokitsukaze-beya) is a stable of sumo wrestlers in Japan, one of the Tokitsukaze group of stables. It was founded in 1769 and was dominant during the Taishō period.

In its modern form it dates from 1941 when it was established by Futabayama, who was still an active wrestler at the time. It was known as Futabayama Dojo until it was re-named Tokitsukaze stable in November 1945 when Futabayama retired. (The stable has the names of both Futabayama and Tokitsukaze at its entrance.) Upon Futabayama's death in 1968 the former Kagamisato took charge for a short time, but Futabayama's widow wanted Yutakayama Katsuo to take over, which he did upon his retirement in 1969. He in turn passed control of the stable on to his successor Futatsuryū in August 2002.

As of May 2026, the stable has 16 active wrestlers.

The death of 17-year-old junior member Tokitaizan (real name Takashi Saito) in a hazing scandal on June 26, 2007, eventually resulted in the dismissal and six years in prison for Futatsuryū. This compelled Tokitsuumi, a long time top division wrestler from the stable, to retire from active sumo and take over as the new head of the stable.

Tokitsuumi was asked by the Japan Sumo Association to retire in February 2021 after twice violating COVID-19 safety protocols. Tokitsukaze stable was taken over by former maegashira Tosayutaka.

== Ring name conventions ==
Many wrestlers at this stable have taken ring names or shikona that begin with the character 時 (read: toki), meaning time, which is the first character in the stable's name, such as Tokitsunada, Tokibayama, Tokitenkū and, more recently, Tokihayate. A number of wrestlers have also included the character 豊 (read: yutaka) in their shikona in deference to the last ōzeki produced by the stable, Yutakayama Katsuo, and the successor to his shikona, Yutakayama Hiromitsu. Examples include Yutakafuji, Tosayutaka and the retired wrestler Yutakayama Ryōta.

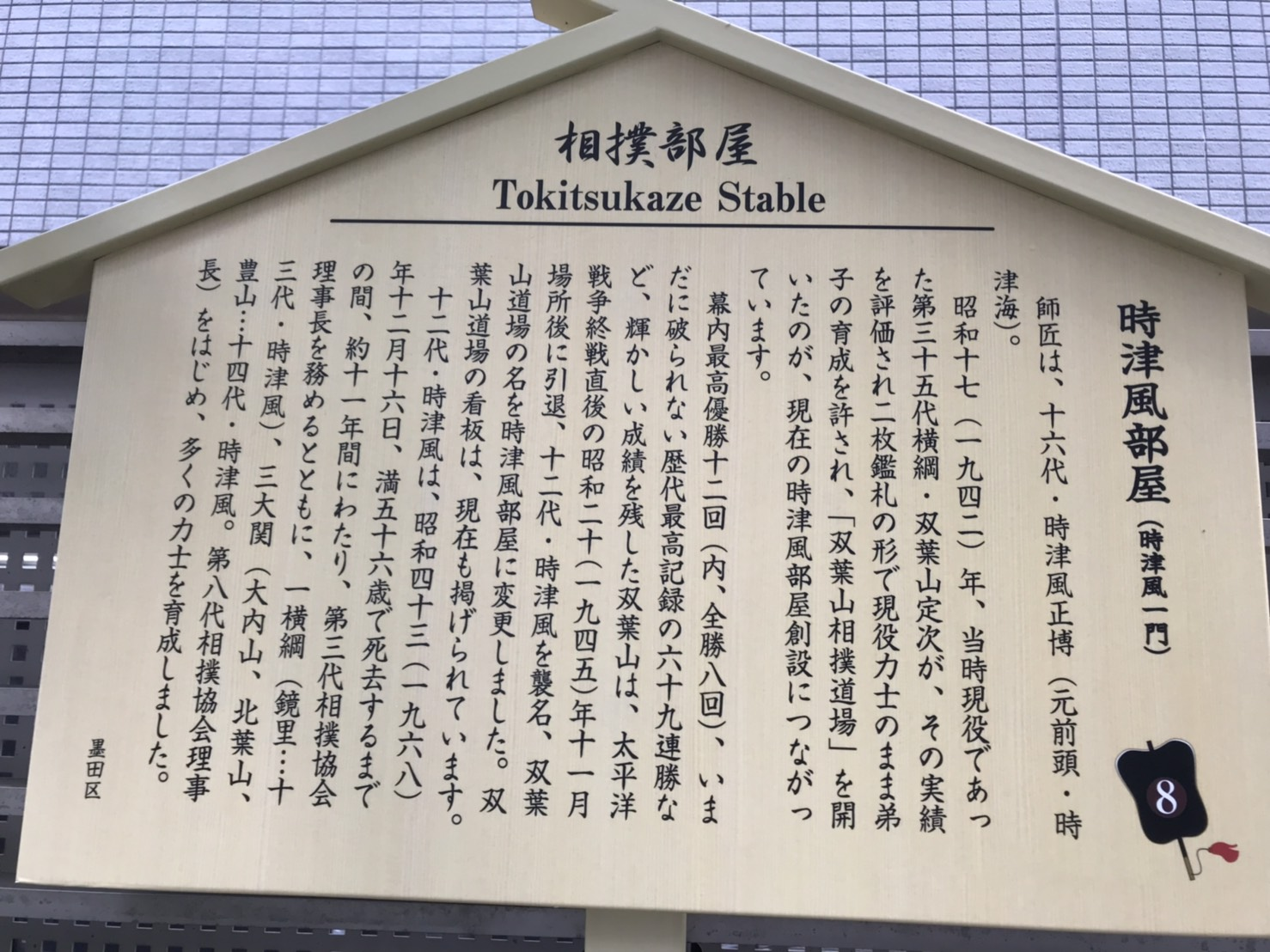
Sign detailing background of the stable

== Owners ==
- 2021–Present: 17th Tokitsukaze (iin, maegashira Tosayutaka, born 1985)
- 2007–2021: 16th Tokitsukaze (iin, maegashira Tokitsuumi, born 1973)
- 2002–2007: 15th Tokitsukaze (komusubi Futatsuryū, 1950–2014)
- 1969–2002: 14th Tokitsukaze (ōzeki Yutakayama II, born 1937)
- 1968–1969: 13th Tokitsukaze (42nd yokozuna Kagamisato, 1923–2004)
- 1941–1968: 12th Tokitsukaze (shunin, 35th yokozuna Futabayama, 1912–1968)

== Coaches ==
- Edagawa Hideki (iin, maegashira Aogiyama, born 1970)
- Nakagawa Kenji (iin, maegashira Asahisato, born 1965)

== Notable active wrestlers ==
- Shōdai (best rank ōzeki)
- Tokihayate (best rank maegashira)
- Tokifudō (best rank jūryō)

== Notable former members ==
- Kagamisato (42nd yokozuna, 1923–2004)
- Kitabayama (ōzeki, born 1935–2010)
- Ōuchiyama (ōzeki, born 1926–1985)
- Yutakayama II (ōzeki, born 1937)
- Kurama (sekiwake, 1952–1995)
- Toyonoshima (sekiwake, born 1983)
- Ōshio (komusubi, 1948–2014)
- Ōyutaka (komusubi, born 1955)
- Shimotori (komusubi, born 1978)
- Tokitenkū (komusubi, 1979–2017)
- Yutakayama III (komusubi, 1947–2020)
- Tosayutaka (maegashira 1, born 1985)
- Tokitsunada (maegashira 4, 1969–2019)
- Sōtairyū (maegashira 15, born 1982)
- Yutakayama IV (maegashira 1, born 1993)

== Usher ==
- Mamoru (makushita yobidashi, real name Mamoru Nagae, born 1985)

== Hairdresser ==
- Tokoyoshi (special class tokoyama, born 1964)

== Location and access ==
Tokyo, Sumida ward, Ryōgoku 3-15-4
3 minute walk from Ryōgoku Station on the Sōbu Line

== See also ==
- List of sumo stables
- List of active sumo wrestlers
- List of past sumo wrestlers
- Glossary of sumo terms
