= Tokitsukaze stable hazing scandal =

2007 Japanese sumo wrestling death

The Tokitsukaze stable hazing scandal occurred in Japan on June 26, 2007, when Takashi Saito (斉藤 俊, Saitō Takashi), a seventeen-year-old junior sumo wrestler who fought under the shikona of Tokitaizan Takashi, collapsed and died after a training session at Tokitsukaze stable's lodgings in Inuyama, Aichi Prefecture, Japan. It emerged that he was beaten with a beer bottle and a metal baseball bat at the direction of his trainer. Saito's cause of death had been reported as heart failure, but his father insisted on an autopsy, which revealed the abuse.

Saito's stable master, Jun'ichi Yamamoto, admitted to beating the 17-year-old novice, who had only been in sumo for three months, and ordering other sumo wrestlers to beat him, due to Saito's "vague attitude" towards the sport. It was also reported that Saito had run away from the stable on a number of occasions. Yamamoto was expelled by the Japan Sumo Association. Yamamoto and three wrestlers from the stable were arrested in February 2008 and were charged with manslaughter. In May 2009, Yamamoto was sentenced to six years in prison. The incident brought substantial political pressure to the governance of the sport in Japan. In the wake of the scandal, the Sumo Association sent a survey to all 53 training stables or heya, and more than 90 percent reported that baseball bats or similar equipment were used on their wrestlers, with around a third saying bullying had occurred during training.

Partly as a result of the Saito case, the Diet of Japan drafted a law promoting cause-of-death investigations, which was enacted in 2012. A separate law in 2013 gave discretion to local police chiefs to allow autopsies even in cases where there were apparently few signs of foul play.
