= Akinoshū Kenji =

Japanese sumo wrestler (born 1969)

Personal information
- Native name: 安芸乃州 賢二
- Born: Kenji Imada; 17 January 1969 (age 57) Hiroshima, Japan
- Height: 1.79 m (5 ft 10 1/2 in)
- Weight: 121 kg (267 lb)

Sport
- Sport: Sumo
- Retired: January, 2001
- Heya: Izutsu
- Record: 409-387-58
- Debut: September, 1984
- Highest rank: Maegashira 9 (January, 1998)
- Championships: 1 (Jūryō)
- Updated on Sep. 2012

Akinoshū Kenji (born 17 January 1969 as Kenji Imada) is a former sumo wrestler from Hiroshima, Japan. He made his professional debut in September 1984, and reached the top division in September 1997. His highest rank was maegashira 9. He left the sumo world upon retirement in January 2001.

== Career record ==
Akinoshū Kenji
Year	January Hatsu basho, Tokyo	March Haru basho, Osaka	May Natsu basho, Tokyo	July Nagoya basho, Nagoya	September Aki basho, Tokyo	November Kyūshū basho, Fukuoka
1984	x	x	x	x	(Maezumo)	East Jonokuchi #47; 3–4
1985	West Jonokuchi #26; 5–2	East Jonidan #121; 1–6	East Jonidan #149; 4–3	East Jonidan #120; 3–4	East Jonidan #141; 4–3	East Jonidan #112; 4–3
1986	East Jonidan #90; 4–3	East Jonidan #58; 3–4	East Jonidan #79; 7–0–P	East Sandanme #71; 0–7	East Jonidan #17; 4–3	West Sandanme #88; 3–4
1987	West Jonidan #3; 4–3	East Sandanme #77; 3–4	West Sandanme #91; 4–3	West Sandanme #72; 2–5	East Jonidan #2; 6–1	West Sandanme #49; 4–3
1988	West Sandanme #35; 3–4	East Sandanme #51; 1–6	West Sandanme #87; 5–2	West Sandanme #54; 4–3	West Sandanme #36; 2–5	West Sandanme #59; 3–4
1989	West Sandanme #78; 4–3	West Sandanme #57; 3–4	East Sandanme #77; 4–3	West Sandanme #57; 5–2	East Sandanme #25; 2–5	West Sandanme #54; 3–4
1990	East Sandanme #75; 6–1	West Sandanme #24; 6–1	West Makushita #47; 5–2	East Makushita #33; 1–6	East Sandanme #2; 4–3	West Makushita #47; 3–4
1991	East Sandanme #1; 5–2	East Makushita #42; 0–7	East Sandanme #18; 4–3	West Sandanme #4; 5–2	West Makushita #43; 3–4	West Makushita #50; 4–3
1992	West Makushita #40; 4–3	East Makushita #30; 4–3	East Makushita #22; 3–4	West Makushita #28; 1–6	West Makushita #55; 4–3	West Makushita #42; 3–4
1993	West Makushita #53; 5–2	East Makushita #32; 3–4	East Makushita #43; 3–4	East Makushita #53; 5–2	East Makushita #38; 4–3	West Makushita #27; 5–2
1994	East Makushita #15; 5–2	West Makushita #8; 2–5	West Makushita #22; 4–3	East Makushita #17; 4–3	West Makushita #12; 1–6	West Makushita #37; 5–2
1995	East Makushita #24; 4–3	West Makushita #17; 3–4	West Makushita #25; 4–3	East Makushita #21; 6–1	West Makushita #7; 3–4	West Makushita #10; 2–5
1996	West Makushita #23; 3–4	East Makushita #36; 5–2	East Makushita #23; 4–3	East Makushita #16; 5–2	West Makushita #8; 6–1	East Makushita #2; 4–3
1997	East Jūryō #13; 8–7	East Jūryō #11; 9–6	West Jūryō #6; 10–5	East Jūryō #2; 9–6	East Maegashira #15; 8–7	East Maegashira #13; 9–6
1998	West Maegashira #9; 5–10	East Maegashira #15; 8–7	East Maegashira #12; 2–13	East Jūryō #6; 12–3; Champion	West Maegashira #15; 8–7	East Maegashira #14; 4–11
1999	East Jūryō #5; 7–8	East Jūryō #7; Sat out due to injury 0–0–15	East Jūryō #7; 8–7	East Jūryō #5; 5–10	West Jūryō #9; 10–5	East Jūryō #3; 5–10
2000	West Jūryō #6; 10–5	East Jūryō #2; 5–10	West Jūryō #6; Sat out due to injury 0–0–15	West Makushita #8; Sat out due to injury 0–0–7	East Makushita #48; Sat out due to injury 0–0–7	East Sandanme #28; Sat out due to injury 0–0–7
2001	West Sandanme #88; Retired; 0–0–7	x	x	x	x	x
Record given as wins–losses–absences Top division champion Top division runner-up Retired Lower divisions Non-participation Sanshō key: F=Fighting spirit; O=Outstanding performance; T=Technique Also shown: ★=Kinboshi; P=Playoff(s); Divisions: Makuuchi — Jūryō — Makushita — Sandanme — Jonidan — Jonokuchi Makuuchi ranks: Yokozuna — Ōzeki — Sekiwake — Komusubi — Maegashira

== See also ==
- List of sumo tournament second division champions
- Glossary of sumo terms
- List of past sumo wrestlers
