= Asanosho Hajime =

Japanese sumo wrestler

Personal information
- Native name: 朝乃翔嚆矢
- Born: Hajime Ozuka; 23 December 1969 (age 56) Odawara, Kanagawa, Japan
- Height: 1.85 m (6 ft 1 in)
- Weight: 134 kg (295 lb)

Sport
- Sport: Sumo
- Retired: January, 2002
- Heya: Wakamatsu
- Record: 332-335-73
- Debut: March, 1992
- Highest rank: Maegashira 2 (March, 1997)
- Elder name: See retirement
- Gold Stars: 1 (Akebono)
- Updated on June 25, 2020

Asanosho Hajime (born 23 December 1969 as Hajime Ozawa, later Hajime Ozuka) is a former sumo wrestler from Odawara, Kanagawa, Japan. He made his professional debut in March 1992, and reached the top division in March 1995. His highest rank was maegashira 2. He defeated yokozuna Akebono in their first meeting in March 1997 to earn his only kinboshi. A back injury sent him down to the sandanme division, and he decided to retire in January 2002, after suffering a detached retina. He became an elder of the Japan Sumo Association, but left in January 2008.

== Career ==
Ozawa played volleyball at junior high school and was also a shotputter. He began sumo in high school, and competed for the sumo club at Kinki University. Upon graduation he was accepted by the Wakamatsu stable run by fellow Kinki University alumni, the former ōzeki Asashio. He made his professional debut in March 1992, and was given makushita tsukedashi status because of his collegiate sumo experience, allowing him to begin at the bottom of the third highest makushita division. He reached sekitori level upon promotion to the second highest jūryō division in May 1994. To mark the occasion he changed his shikona or fighting name from his family name to Asanosho, the "Asa" prefix meaning morning a common one at his stable. He was promoted to the top makuuchi division in March 1995.

Asanosho never managed to win a special prize in his top division career, and was unable to reach the san'yaku ranks, peaking at maegashira 2 in March 1997. In this tournament he had his first and only win over a yokozuna, defeating Akebono in the pair's first ever meeting. However he fell just short of a majority of wins with a 7–8 record. He returned to maegashira 2 in September 1999 but again scored 7–8. He fought in 32 makuuchi tournaments, with a record of 213 wins against 248 losses, with 19 injury absences. He was demoted from makuuchi after the May 2000 tournament and was forced to withdraw from the following tournament in July with a herniated disc after fighting just one match, which saw him fall to makushita.

== Retirement from sumo ==
After suffering a recurrence of his herniated disc injury which sent him down to the sandanme division, Asanosho was beginning to make a comeback and climb the makushita division when he suffered a detached retina, missing the November 2001 tournament. He decided to retire and his last tournament on the banzuke was in January 2002. He did not own stock in the Japan Sumo Association but was able to stay temporarily under the jun-toshiyori system, using his fighting shikona as his elder name. In September 2003 he switched to the Wakamatsu name, changing to Sanoyama when Wakamatsu was needed by his retiring former stablemate Asanowaka in April 2005. In August 2005 he switched to Sekinoto when the former Fukunohana turned 65 and retired, and in February 2007 he changed to Oshiogawa. In August 2007 that name was needed by the former Wakatoba so he changed to Wakafuji. However, in January 2008 the owner of the Wakafuji name, Ōtsukasa lent it to his former stablemate Yōtsukasa and Asanosho was forced to leave sumo, as no other elder names were available. He later worked in general sales at a logistics company in Osaka, and he has been a coach in local amateur sumo. In March 2018 he was appointed as a hyōgiin or outside voter in the Sumo Association, although he has no oyakata status.

== Fighting style ==
Asanosho was well known for his attacking tsuppari style, using a series of rapid thrusts to the opponent's chest to force them out of the dohyō. When fighting on the mawashi or belt his favoured grip was hidari-yotsu, a left hand outside, right hand inside position. His most common winning kimarite were oshi-dashi (push out), tsuki-dashi (thrust out) and hataki-komi (slap down).

== Career record ==
Asanosho Hajime
Year	January Hatsu basho, Tokyo	March Haru basho, Osaka	May Natsu basho, Tokyo	July Nagoya basho, Nagoya	September Aki basho, Tokyo	November Kyūshū basho, Fukuoka
1992	x	Makushita tsukedashi #60; 4–3	West Makushita #48; 5–2	East Makushita #27; 4–3	West Makushita #18; 5–2	West Makushita #9; 5–2
1993	West Makushita #2; 5–2	West Jūryō #12; 9–6	East Jūryō #9; 2–7–6	West Makushita #12; Sat out due to injury 0–0–7	West Makushita #12; 3–4	West Makushita #18; 5–2
1994	West Makushita #9; 4–3	West Makushita #5; 5–2	East Jūryō #13; 8–7	East Jūryō #11; 8–7	West Jūryō #7; 9–6	West Jūryō #3; 9–6
1995	East Jūryō #1; 8–7	East Maegashira #16; 8–7	East Maegashira #11; 8–7	East Maegashira #8; 5–10	East Maegashira #13; 8–7	East Maegashira #12; 9–6
1996	West Maegashira #7; 6–9	West Maegashira #11; 8–7	East Maegashira #5; 6–9	West Maegashira #7; 6–9	East Maegashira #10; 8–7	West Maegashira #4; 5–10
1997	West Maegashira #7; 8–7	West Maegashira #2; 7–8 ★	East Maegashira #3; 5–10	East Maegashira #7; 7–8	East Maegashira #8; 4–7–4	East Maegashira #15; Sat out due to injury 0–0–15
1998	East Maegashira #15; 9–6	West Maegashira #11; 7–8	East Maegashira #14; 8–7	East Maegashira #12; 7–8	West Maegashira #13; 8–7	West Maegashira #10; 6–9
1999	West Maegashira #13; 6–9	West Maegashira #14; 8–7	East Maegashira #13; 9–6	West Maegashira #8; 9–6	West Maegashira #2; 7–8	West Maegashira #3; 4–11
2000	West Maegashira #8; 7–8	East Maegashira #10; 6–9	West Maegashira #12; 4–11	West Jūryō #5; 0–1–14	West Makushita #6; 2–5	East Makushita #17; 0–1–6
2001	West Makushita #57; Sat out due to injury 0–0–7	East Sandanme #37; 6–1	East Makushita #53; 4–3	West Makushita #44; 5–2	East Makushita #30; 4–3	East Makushita #26; Sat out due to injury 0–0–7
2002	West Sandanme #6; Retired; 0–0–7	x	x	x	x	x
Record given as wins–losses–absences Top division champion Top division runner-up Retired Lower divisions Non-participation Sanshō key: F=Fighting spirit; O=Outstanding performance; T=Technique Also shown: ★=Kinboshi; P=Playoff(s); Divisions: Makuuchi — Jūryō — Makushita — Sandanme — Jonidan — Jonokuchi Makuuchi ranks: Yokozuna — Ōzeki — Sekiwake — Komusubi — Maegashira

== See also ==
- Glossary of sumo terms
- List of past sumo wrestlers
