= 1998 in sumo =

The following are the events in professional sumo in 1998.

== Tournaments ==
=== Hatsu basho ===
Ryogoku Kokugikan, Tokyo, January 11 – January 25

1998 Hatsu basho results - Makuuchi Division
W		L		A	East			Rank	West			W		L		A
8	-	5	-	2	ø	(Japan)	**Takanohana**	Y		(United States)	**Akebono**	10	-	5	-	0
10	-	5	-	0		(Japan)	**Takanonami**	O		(United States)	**Musashimaru**	12	-	3	-	0
10	-	5	-	0		(Japan)	**Wakanohana**	O	ø							
10	-	5	-	0		(Japan)	**Musōyama**	S		(Japan)	**Tochiazuma**	11	-	4	-	0
8	-	7	-	0		(Japan)	**Kaiō**	K		(Japan)	**Kotonishiki**	10	-	5	-	0
5	-	10	-	0		(Japan)	Takatōriki	M1		(Japan)	Akinoshima	6	-	9	-	0
0	-	0	-	15	ø	(Japan)	Dejima	M2		(Japan)	Tochinonada	7	-	8	-	0
5	-	10	-	0		(Japan)	Tosanoumi	M3		(Japan)	Kotonowaka	7	-	8	-	0
5	-	10	-	0		(Mongolia)	Kyokushūzan	M4		(Japan)	Asahiyutaka	3	-	12	-	0
5	-	10	-	0		(Japan)	Oginishiki	M5		(Japan)	Aogiyama	6	-	9	-	0
6	-	9	-	0		(Japan)	Minatofuji	M6		(Japan)	Tamakasuga	6	-	9	-	0
8	-	7	-	0		(Japan)	**Shikishima**	M7		(Japan)	Hamanoshima	5	-	10	-	0
9	-	6	-	0		(Japan)	**Chiyotaikai**	M8		(Japan)	Higonoumi	5	-	10	-	0
6	-	9	-	0		(Japan)	**Ganyū**	M9		(Japan)	Akinoshū	7	-	8	-	0
6	-	9	-	0		(Japan)	Mitoizumi	M10		(Japan)	Kitakachidoki	7	-	8	-	0
9	-	6	-	0		(Japan)	**Kotoryū**	M11		(Japan)	**Kotoinazuma**	8	-	7	-	0
7	-	8	-	0		(Japan)	Asanowaka	M12		(Japan)	**Tochinowaka**	9	-	6	-	0
9	-	6	-	0		(Japan)	**Wakanojō**	M13		(Japan)	**Terao**	9	-	6	-	0
7	-	8	-	0		(United States)	Yamato	M14		(Japan)	**Mainoumi**	9	-	6	-	0
9	-	6	-	0		(Japan)	**Asanosho**	M15		(Mongolia)	**Kyokutenhō**	9	-	6	-	0
9	-	6	-	0		(Japan)	**Gojōrō**	M16	ø							

ø - Indicates a pull-out or absent rank
**winning record in bold**
**Yusho Winner**

=== Haru basho ===
Osaka Prefectural Gymnasium, Osaka, March 8 – March 22

1998 Haru basho results - Makuuchi Division
W		L		A	East			Rank	West			W		L		A
13	-	2	-	0		(United States)	**Akebono**	Y	ø	(Japan)	Takanohana	1	-	4	-	10
8	-	7	-	0		(United States)	**Musashimaru**	O		(Japan)	**Takanonami**	8	-	7	-	0
14	-	1	-	0		(Japan)	**Wakanohana**	O	ø							
2	-	4	-	9	ø	(Japan)	Tochiazuma	S		(Japan)	**Musōyama**	9	-	6	-	0
6	-	9	-	0		(Japan)	Kotonishiki	K		(Japan)	**Kaiō**	8	-	7	-	0
8	-	7	-	0		(Japan)	**Chiyotaikai**	M1		(Japan)	Shikishima	3	-	12	-	0
0	-	0	-	15	ø	(Japan)	Dejima	M2		(Japan)	**Akinoshima**	9	-	6	-	0
9	-	6	-	0		(Japan)	**Tochinonada**	M3		(Japan)	Ganyū	3	-	12	-	0
8	-	7	-	0		(Japan)	**Kotonowaka**	M4		(Japan)	Takatōriki	7	-	8	-	0
4	-	11	-	0		(Japan)	Kotoryū	M5		(Japan)	Tochinowaka	5	-	10	-	0
10	-	5	-	0		(Japan)	**Tosanoumi**	M6		(Japan)	Wakanojō	5	-	10	-	0
4	-	11	-	0		(Mongolia)	Kyokushūzan	M7		(Japan)	**Aogiyama**	11	-	4	-	0
5	-	10	-	0		(Japan)	Terao	M8		(Japan)	**Oginishiki**	9	-	6	-	0
8	-	7	-	0		(Japan)	**Minatofuji**	M9		(Japan)	**Tamakasuga**	8	-	7	-	0
6	-	9	-	0		(Japan)	Kotoinazuma	M10		(Japan)	Mainoumi	5	-	10	-	0
8	-	7	-	0		(Japan)	**Asahiyutaka**	M11		(Japan)	Asanosho	7	-	8	-	0
6	-	9	-	0		(Mongolia)	Kyokutenhō	M12		(Japan)	**Hamanoshima**	8	-	7	-	0
8	-	7	-	0		(Japan)	**Kitakachidoki**	M13		(Japan)	**Gojōrō**	9	-	6	-	0
9	-	6	-	0		(Japan)	**Higonoumi**	M14		(Japan)	**Mitoizumi**	9	-	6	-	0
8	-	7	-	0		(Japan)	**Akinoshū**	M15		(Japan)	**Asanowaka**	8	-	7	-	0
0	-	0	-	15	ø	(United States)	Yamato	M16	ø							

ø - Indicates a pull-out or absent rank
**winning record in bold**
**Yusho Winner**

=== Natsu basho ===
Tokyo, May 10 – May 24

1998 Natsu basho results - Makuuchi Division
W		L		A	East		Rank	West			W		L		A
10	-	5	-	0	(United States)	**Akebono**	Y		(Japan)	**Takanohana**	10	-	5	-	0
12	-	3	-	0	(Japan)	**Wakanohana**	O		(United States)	**Musashimaru**	10	-	5	-	0
11	-	4	-	0	(Japan)	**Takanonami**	O	ø							
5	-	10	-	0	(Japan)	Musōyama	S		(Japan)	Kaiō	7	-	8	-	0
8	-	7	-	0	(Japan)	**Chiyotaikai**	K		(Japan)	**Akinoshima**	10	-	5	-	0
7	-	8	-	0	(Japan)	Tochinonada	M1		(Japan)	Aogiyama	3	-	12	-	0
11	-	4	-	0	(Japan)	**Kotonishiki**	M2		(Japan)	Tosanoumi	4	-	11	-	0
4	-	11	-	0	(Japan)	Kotonowaka	M3		(Japan)	**Oginishiki**	8	-	7	-	0
4	-	11	-	0	(Japan)	Minatofuji	M4		(Japan)	Tamakasuga	4	-	11	-	0
9	-	6	-	0	(Japan)	**Takatōriki**	M5	ø	(Japan)	Tochiazuma	0	-	0	-	15
8	-	7	-	0	(Japan)	**Shikishima**	M6		(Japan)	Asahiyutaka	7	-	8	-	0
9	-	6	-	0	(Japan)	**Gojōrō**	M7		(Japan)	**Tochinowaka**	8	-	7	-	0
8	-	7	-	0	(Japan)	**Ganyū**	M8		(Japan)	**Hamanoshima**	8	-	7	-	0
8	-	7	-	0	(Japan)	**Higonoumi**	M9		(Japan)	**Wakanojō**	8	-	7	-	0
6	-	9	-	0	(Japan)	Mitoizumi	M10		(Japan)	Kotoryū	6	-	9	-	0
5	-	10	-	0	(Japan)	Kitakachidoki	M11		(Japan)	**Dejima**	10	-	5	-	0
2	-	13	-	0	(Japan)	Akinoshū	M12		(Japan)	**Terao**	9	-	6	-	0
7	-	8	-	0	(Japan)	Asanowaka	M13		(Mongolia)	**Kyokushūzan**	9	-	6	-	0
8	-	7	-	0	(Japan)	**Asanosho**	M14		(Japan)	**Kotoinazuma**	8	-	7	-	0
7	-	8	-	0	(Japan)	Tōki	M15		(Japan)	**Wakanosato**	10	-	5	-	0
8	-	7	-	0	(Japan)	**Kaihō**	M16	ø							

ø - Indicates a pull-out or absent rank
**winning record in bold**
**Yusho Winner**

=== Nagoya basho ===
Aichi Prefectural Gymnasium, July 5 – July 19

1998 Nagoya basho results - Makuuchi Division
W		L		A	East			Rank	West			W		L		A
11	-	4	-	0		(United States)	**Akebono**	Y		(Japan)	**Takanohana**	14	-	1	-	0
10	-	5	-	0		(Japan)	**Wakanohana**	Y	ø							
9	-	6	-	0		(Japan)	**Takanonami**	O		(United States)	**Musashimaru**	12	-	3	-	0
3	-	4	-	8	ø	(Japan)	Akinoshima	S		(Japan)	**Chiyotaikai**	11	-	4	-	0
1	-	2	-	12	ø	(Japan)	Kotonishiki	K		(Japan)	Kaiō	7	-	8	-	0
2	-	9	-	4	ø	(Japan)	Oginishiki	M1		(Japan)	**Takatōriki**	10	-	5	-	0
9	-	6	-	0		(Japan)	**Musōyama**	M2		(Japan)	Tochinonada	5	-	10	-	0
3	-	12	-	0		(Japan)	Gojōrō	M3	ø	(Japan)	Shikishima	4	-	9	-	2
3	-	12	-	0		(Japan)	Tochinowaka	M4		(Japan)	**Dejima**	10	-	5	-	0
3	-	12	-	0		(Japan)	Ganyū	M5		(Japan)	Tochiazuma	8	-	7	-	0
4	-	11	-	0		(Japan)	Hamanoshima	M6		(Japan)	Higonoumi	6	-	9	-	0
7	-	7	-	1	ø	(Japan)	Tosanoumi	M7		(Japan)	Wakanojō	4	-	11	-	0
8	-	7	-	0		(Japan)	**Asahiyutaka**	M8		(Japan)	**Aogiyama**	8	-	7	-	0
4	-	11	-	0		(Japan)	Terao	M9		(Japan)	**Kotonowaka**	11	-	4	-	0
9	-	6	-	0		(Japan)	**Minatofuji**	M10		(Japan)	**Tamakasuga**	9	-	6	-	0
9	-	6	-	0		(Japan)	**Wakanosato**	M11		(Mongolia)	**Kyokushūzan**	9	-	6	-	0
7	-	8	-	0		(Japan)	Asanosho	M12		(Japan)	Kotoinazuma	7	-	8	-	0
8	-	7	-	0		(Japan)	**Mitoizumi**	M13		(Japan)	**Kotoryū**	9	-	6	-	0
8	-	7	-	0		(Japan)	**Kaihō**	M14		(Japan)	Dewaarashi	6	-	9	-	0
7	-	8	-	0		(Japan)	Kinkaiyama	M15		(Mongolia)	Kyokutenhō	4	-	11	-	0
8	-	7	-	0		(Japan)	**Asanowaka**	M16	ø							

ø - Indicates a pull-out or absent rank
**winning record in bold**
**Yusho Winner**

=== Aki basho ===
Tokyo, September 13 – September 27

1998 Aki basho results - Makuuchi Division
W		L		A	East			Rank	West			W		L		A
13	-	2	-	0		(Japan)	**Takanohana**	Y		(United States)	**Akebono**	10	-	5	-	0
12	-	3	-	0		(Japan)	**Wakanohana**	Y	ø							
11	-	4	-	0		(United States)	**Musashimaru**	O		(Japan)	**Takanonami**	10	-	5	-	0
9	-	6	-	0		(Japan)	**Chiyotaikai**	S		(Japan)	**Takatōriki**	8	-	7	-	0
8	-	7	-	0		(Japan)	**Musōyama**	K		(Japan)	**Dejima**	8	-	7	-	0
7	-	8	-	0		(Japan)	Kaiō	M1		(Japan)	**Tochiazuma**	8	-	7	-	0
9	-	6	-	0		(Japan)	**Kotonowaka**	M2		(Japan)	Minatofuji	3	-	12	-	0
3	-	12	-	0		(Japan)	Asahiyutaka	M3		(Japan)	Tamakasuga	6	-	9	-	0
5	-	10	-	0		(Japan)	Aogiyama	M4		(Japan)	Wakanosato	6	-	9	-	0
4	-	11	-	0		(Mongolia)	Kyokushūzan	M5	ø	(Japan)	Akinoshima	0	-	0	-	15
7	-	8	-	0		(Japan)	Tochinonada	M6		(Japan)	Kotoryū	5	-	10	-	0
5	-	10	-	0		(Japan)	Kotonishiki	M7	ø	(Japan)	Shikishima	0	-	0	-	15
5	-	10	-	0		(Japan)	Mitoizumi	M8	ø	(Japan)	Oginishiki	0	-	0	-	15
0	-	0	-	15	ø	(Japan)	Tosanoumi	M9		(Japan)	Gojōrō	6	-	9	-	0
8	-	7	-	0		(Japan)	**Kaihō**	M10		(Japan)	**Higonoumi**	9	-	6	-	0
8	-	7	-	0		(Japan)	**Tochinowaka**	M11		(Japan)	**Ganyū**	8	-	7	-	0
8	-	7	-	0		(Japan)	**Hamanoshima**	M12		(Japan)	Asanowaka	7	-	8	-	0
8	-	7	-	0		(Japan)	**Wakanojō**	M13		(Japan)	**Asanosho**	8	-	7	-	0
4	-	11	-	0		(Japan)	Kotoinazuma	M14		(Japan)	**Tokitsuumi**	8	-	7	-	0
10	-	5	-	0		(Japan)	**Tōki**	M15		(Japan)	**Akinoshū**	8	-	7	-	0
9	-	6	-	0		(Japan)	**Terao**	M16	ø							

ø - Indicates a pull-out or absent rank
**winning record in bold**
**Yusho Winner**

=== Kyushu basho ===
Fukuoka International Center, November 8 – November 22

1998 Kyushu basho results - Makuuchi Division
W		L		A	East			Rank	West			W		L		A
12	-	3	-	0		(Japan)	**Takanohana**	Y		(Japan)	**Wakanohana**	9	-	6	-	0
0	-	0	-	15	ø	(United States)	Akebono	Y	ø							
11	-	4	-	0		(United States)	**Musashimaru**	O		(Japan)	**Takanonami**	8	-	7	-	0
10	-	5	-	0		(Japan)	**Chiyotaikai**	S		(Japan)	Takatōriki	5	-	10	-	0
9	-	6	-	0		(Japan)	**Musōyama**	K		(Japan)	**Dejima**	9	-	6	-	0
					ø			K		(Japan)	**Kotonowaka**	10	-	5	-	0
10	-	5	-	0		(Japan)	**Tochiazuma**	M1		(Japan)	**Kaiō**	8	-	7	-	0
4	-	11	-	0		(Japan)	Higonoumi	M2		(Japan)	Kaihō	3	-	12	-	0
5	-	10	-	0		(Japan)	Tochinowaka	M3		(Japan)	Ganyū	3	-	12	-	0
7	-	8	-	0		(Japan)	Tōki	M4		(Japan)	**Tamakasuga**	8	-	7	-	0
3	-	12	-	0		(Japan)	Hamanoshima	M5		(Japan)	**Akinoshima**	8	-	7	-	0
7	-	7	-	1	ø	(Japan)	Wakanosato	M6		(Japan)	Tochinonada	6	-	9	-	0
8	-	7	-	0		(Japan)	**Aogiyama**	M7		(Japan)	Shikishima	7	-	8	-	0
6	-	9	-	0		(Japan)	Wakanojō	M8		(Japan)	Oginishiki	6	-	9	-	0
12	-	3	-	0		(Japan)	**Tosanoumi**	M9		(Japan)	**Minatofuji**	8	-	7	-	0
6	-	9	-	0		(Japan)	Asahiyutaka	M10		(Japan)	Asanosho	6	-	9	-	0
8	-	7	-	0		(Japan)	**Kotoryū**	M11		(Japan)	**Terao**	8	-	7	-	0
8	-	7	-	0		(Mongolia)	**Kyokushūzan**	M12		(Japan)	**Kotonishiki**	14	-	1	-	0
9	-	6	-	0		(Japan)	**Tokitsuumi**	M13		(Japan)	**Gojōrō**	8	-	7	-	0
4	-	11	-	0		(Japan)	Akinoshū	M14		(Japan)	**Mitoizumi**	8	-	7	-	0
6	-	9	-	0		(Japan)	Asanowaka	M15		(Japan)	Ōikari	5	-	10	-	0

ø - Indicates a pull-out or absent rank
**winning record in bold**
**Yusho Winner**

== News ==
=== January ===
- At the Hatsu tournament in Tokyo, Ozeki Musashimaru wins his third top division championship or yusho, his first since November 1996, with a 12–3 record. He finishes one win ahead of sekiwake Tochiazuma who wins the Outstanding Performance Prize. The other sekiwake Musoyama gets the Fighting Spirit Award, and komusubi Kotonishiki receives his seventh Technique Prize. Yokozuna Takanohana loses three in a row from 8–1 and then withdraws. In the juryo division, Kinkaiyama wins the yusho in his first tournament in the division. Announcing their retirements are former maegashira Asahisato and former juryo Daiki, from Hawaii.

=== February ===
- In the Japan Sumo Association board elections, Tokitsukaze Oyakata (former ozeki Yutakayama) becomes the new chairman or rijicho, replacing Sakaigawa (the former yokozuna Sadanoyama), who had held the post since 1992. The elections prove controversial for the Takasago ichimon, with Jinmaku (former yokozuna Kitanofuji) leaving the Association altogether after failing to receive enough support from his fellow directors, and the Takadagawa stable thrown out of the ichimon after its head coach (former ozeki Maenoyama) runs as an independent candidate.

=== March ===
- In Osaka, ozeki Wakanohana wins his fourth yusho with a 14–1 score. He finishes one win ahead of yokozuna Akebono, who drops his first two bouts but then wins thirteen in a row. Takanohana drops out after five days with a liver disorder. Chiyotaikai wins the Technique prize and Kaio the Outstanding Performance award. The Fighting Spirit prize is shared between Tosanoumi and Aogiyama. The juryo championship is won by veteran Kushimaumi after a playoff with Toki.

=== May ===
- The first day of a Tokyo tournament fails to sell out for the first time since 1970.
- Wakanohana wins his second consecutive championship, and earns promotion to yokozuna, creating the first ever sibling grand champions. He defeats Musashimaru on the final day to finish on 12–3. Runners-up are Takanonami and Kotonishiki on 11–4. Musashimaru, Takanohana, and Akebono all score 10–5. There are six special prize winners: Akinoshima (Technique), Kotonishiki and Oginishiki (Outstanding Performance), Dejima and Wakanosato (Fighting Spirit). Dejima wins 10 bouts after being out for two tournaments. The juryo championship is won by Oikari after a three way playoff.

=== June ===
- Sumo Canada Basho in Vancouver.

=== July ===
- In Nagoya, Takanohana returns from illness to win his 19th championship with a 14–1 score. Musashimaru is runner-up, two wins behind. New sekiwake Chiyotaikai wins eleven and the Technique Prize. Kotonowaka also wins eleven and gets the Fighting Spirit Award. Dejima defeats two yokozuna and wins the Outstanding Performance prize. Wakanohana finishes on 10–5 in his debut yokozuna tournament. In the juryo division, two former makuuchi veterans, maegashira Oginohana and komusubi Misugisato, retire after winning only one and three bouts respectively. The championship is won by Akinoshu, his first yusho after 14 years in sumo.

=== September ===
- Takanohana becomes only the fourth man, after Taiho, Kitanoumi, and Chiyonofuji, to reach twenty top division championships. He finishes on 13–2, one win ahead of his brother. Kotonowaka wins the Outstanding Performance prize, and Chiyotaikai the Technique Award. Chiyotenzan wins the juryo championship. Former maegashira Yamato from Hawaii, now in makushita, and former komusubi Tomoefuji, who has fallen to sandanme, announce their retirements.

=== November ===
- Kotonishiki becomes the first wrestler ever to win two championships as a maegashira after winning in Kyushu with a 14–1 score, seven years after his first yusho in September 1991. He finishes two wins ahead of Takanohana and Tosanoumi, and is awarded Technique and Outstanding Performance prizes. Tochiazuma shares the Technique Prize, and Tosanoumi gets the Fighting Spirit award. Wakanohana can score only 9–6, and Akebono sits the tournament out through injury. The juryo yusho goes to former amateur champion Miyabiyama. Kushimaumi retires, having fallen into the makushita division.

== Deaths ==
- 10 March: Former komusubi Kenko, aged 30, of leukemia.
- 26 September: Former maegashira Toyonishiki, first Japanese American to reach makuuchi, aged 78.
- 4 November: Former sekiwake Maedagawa, aged 61.

== See also ==
- Glossary of sumo terms
- List of past sumo wrestlers
- List of years in sumo
- List of yokozuna
