= Kenkō Satoshi =

Sumo wrestler

Personal information
- Native name: 剣晃 敏志
- Born: Satoshi Hoshimura; 27 June 1967 Moriguchi, Osaka
- Died: 10 March 1998 (aged 30) Osakasayama, Osaka
- Height: 1.91 m (6 ft 3 in)
- Weight: 135 kg (298 lb)

Sport
- Sport: Sumo
- Heya: Takadagawa
- Record: 404-403-59
- Debut: November, 1984
- Highest rank: Komusubi (May, 1995)
- Special Prizes: Fighting Spirit (1); Outstanding Performance (1)
- Gold Stars: 2 (Akebono, Takanohana II)
- Updated on August 2007

Kenkō Satoshi (剣晃 敏志, 27 June 1967 – 10 March 1998) was a sumo wrestler from Osaka, Japan. His highest rank was komusubi.

== Career ==
Debuting in November 1984, he reached the second highest jūryō division in March 1991. His first tournament in the top makuuchi division was in July 1992. Scoring only three wins there he fell back to jūryō, but reappeared in makuuchi in March 1993. He reached his highest rank of komusubi in May 1995. He fell back to maegashira 4 in July but turned in a strong 11-4 record, defeating yokozuna Akebono and returning to komusubi in September 1995. He also defeated yokozuna Takanohana in May 1996, the only wrestler to do so in that tournament.

In May 1997 Kenkō managed an 8-7 record at maegashira 11, but that was to be the last tournament in which he competed. He was hospitalised from July 1997, suffering from pancytopenia caused by an extremely rare form of leukemia (only four previous cases had ever been reported in Japan). His name remained on the ranking sheets, but unable to compete he had dropped to makushita 55 by March 1998. He died on 10 March, from a pulmonary embolism.

== Fighting style ==
Kenkō favoured techniques involving grabbing the opponent's mawashi, or yotsu-sumo. His favourite grip was hidari-yotsu, with his right hand outside and left hand inside his opponent's arms. His most common winning kimarite was yorikiri, a straightforward force out, followed by uwatenage (overarm throw) and yoritaoshi (force out and down).

== Career record ==
Kenkō Satoshi
Year	January Hatsu basho, Tokyo	March Haru basho, Osaka	May Natsu basho, Tokyo	July Nagoya basho, Nagoya	September Aki basho, Tokyo	November Kyūshū basho, Fukuoka
1984	x	x	x	x	x	(Maezumo)
1985	West Jonokuchi #35; 6–1–PP	West Jonidan #90; 4–3	East Jonidan #66; 3–4	East Jonidan #83; 4–3	West Jonidan #69; 3–4	West Jonidan #82; 3–4
1986	East Jonidan #98; 6–1	West Jonidan #30; 2–5	West Jonidan #59; 5–2	West Jonidan #13; 4–3	West Sandanme #89; 2–5	East Jonidan #11; 5–2
1987	West Sandanme #79; 4–3	East Sandanme #56; 2–5	East Sandanme #82; 5–2	West Sandanme #54; 5–2	West Sandanme #32; 3–4	East Sandanme #51; 4–3
1988	West Sandanme #37; 5–2	West Sandanme #11; 5–2	West Makushita #49; 3–4	West Sandanme #3; 4–3	East Makushita #52; 3–4	West Sandanme #3; 4–3
1989	East Makushita #49; 3–4	East Makushita #59; 4–3	West Makushita #44; 5–2	West Makushita #25; 4–3	West Makushita #17; 5–2	East Makushita #7; 3–4
1990	West Makushita #11; 3–4	West Makushita #18; 2–5	West Makushita #38; 5–2	West Makushita #25; 4–3	West Makushita #19; 5–2	West Makushita #7; 4–3
1991	East Makushita #3; 5–2	East Jūryō #12; 5–10	East Makushita #4; 5–2	East Jūryō #13; 8–7	East Jūryō #8; 9–6	East Jūryō #4; 9–6
1992	East Jūryō #1; 6–9	East Jūryō #5; 8–7	West Jūryō #2; 9–6	West Maegashira #14; 3–12	East Jūryō #6; 8–7	West Jūryō #3; 8–7
1993	East Jūryō #2; 9–6	West Maegashira #14; 10–5	East Maegashira #6; 5–10	East Maegashira #13; 9–6	East Maegashira #4; 7–8	East Maegashira #5; 7–8
1994	East Maegashira #6; 6–9	West Maegashira #9; 9–6	West Maegashira #2; 4–11	West Maegashira #10; 9–6	West Maegashira #2; 4–11	West Maegashira #8; 8–7
1995	East Maegashira #4; 5–10	West Maegashira #7; 10–5	West Komusubi #1; 5–10	East Maegashira #4; 11–4; O★	West Komusubi #1; 6–9	East Maegashira #1; 5–10
1996	East Maegashira #5; 8–7; F	East Maegashira #1; 5–10	West Maegashira #5; 6–9 ★	East Maegashira #8; 9–6	East Maegashira #2; 4–11	East Maegashira #6; 8–7
1997	West Maegashira #2; 6–9	East Maegashira #5; 4–11	East Maegashira #11; 8–7	West Maegashira #6; Sat out due to injury 0–0–15	West Jūryō #1; Sat out due to injury 0–0–15	West Jūryō #13; Sat out due to injury 0–0–15
1998	West Makushita #15; Sat out due to injury 0–0–7	East Makushita #55; Retired; 0–0–2	x	x	x	x
Record given as wins–losses–absences Top division champion Top division runner-up Retired Lower divisions Non-participation Sanshō key: F=Fighting spirit; O=Outstanding performance; T=Technique Also shown: ★=Kinboshi; P=Playoff(s); Divisions: Makuuchi — Jūryō — Makushita — Sandanme — Jonidan — Jonokuchi Makuuchi ranks: Yokozuna — Ōzeki — Sekiwake — Komusubi — Maegashira

== See also ==
- Glossary of sumo terms
- List of past sumo wrestlers
- List of komusubi
