= Komafudō Daisuke =

Japanese sumo wrestler (1965–2025)

Personal information
- Native name: 駒不動 大助
- Born: Kazuhito Araki; 15 September 1965 Toyama City, Toyama, Japan
- Died: 15 December 2025 (aged 60)
- Height: 1.81 m (5 ft 11 1/2 in)
- Weight: 142 kg (313 lb)

Sport
- Sport: Sumo
- Retired: November, 1995
- Heya: Hanakago → Hanaregoma
- Record: 333-278-23
- Debut: January, 1984
- Highest rank: Maegashira 13 (September, 1989)
- Championships: 1 (Jūryō)
- Updated on Sep. 2012

Komafudō Daisuke (Japanese: 駒不動 大助; 15 September 1965 – 15 December 2025), born Kazuhito Araki (新木数人, Araki Kazuhito), was a Japanese sumo wrestler from Toyama City, Toyama. He made his professional debut in January 1984 and reached the top division in September 1989. His highest rank was maegashira 13. He left the sumo world upon retirement from active competition in November 1995. Komafudō died from heart failure on 15 December 2025, at the age of 60.

== Career record ==
Komafudō Daisuke
Year	January Hatsu basho, Tokyo	March Haru basho, Osaka	May Natsu basho, Tokyo	July Nagoya basho, Nagoya	September Aki basho, Tokyo	November Kyūshū basho, Fukuoka
1984	(Maezumo)	West Jonokuchi #35; 5–2	West Jonidan #109; 6–1	West Jonidan #46; 5–2	West Jonidan #14; 6–1	West Sandanme #56; 4–3
1985	West Sandanme #37; 3–4	East Sandanme #49; 4–3	East Sandanme #32; 4–3	East Sandanme #20; Sat out due to injury 0–0–7	East Sandanme #71; 5–2	East Sandanme #44; 5–2
1986	East Sandanme #10; 6–1	West Makushita #38; 6–1	East Makushita #19; 4–3	West Makushita #13; 4–3	West Makushita #6; 5–2	West Makushita #1; 3–4
1987	West Makushita #4; 3–4	West Makushita #9; 3–4	East Makushita #15; 2–5	East Makushita #32; 2–5	East Makushita #56; 5–2	East Makushita #35; 4–3
1988	East Makushita #26; 4–3	East Makushita #15; 3–4	East Makushita #22; 5–2	West Makushita #13; 6–1	East Makushita #3; 6–2	West Jūryō #11; 4–11
1989	East Makushita #5; 5–2	East Jūryō #13; 8–7	West Jūryō #9; 10–5–PP	West Jūryō #2; 10–5	West Maegashira #13; 5–10	East Jūryō #6; 6–9
1990	East Jūryō #11; 7–8	East Jūryō #12; 8–7	West Jūryō #9; 4–11	East Makushita #5; 3–4	East Makushita #9; 5–2	West Makushita #3; 3–4
1991	East Makushita #6; 5–2	East Makushita #4; 5–2	East Jūryō #12; 9–6	East Jūryō #7; 3–3–9	West Makushita #3; Sat out due to injury 0–0–7	West Makushita #3; 3–4
1992	West Makushita #7; 3–4	East Makushita #13; 4–3	East Makushita #11; 4–3	East Makushita #6; 4–3	East Makushita #3; 6–1–P	East Jūryō #12; 11–4; Champion
1993	West Jūryō #4; 6–9	East Jūryō #9; 7–8	West Jūryō #10; 8–7	West Jūryō #9; 3–12	West Makushita #9; 3–4	East Makushita #15; 6–1
1994	West Makushita #6; 5–2	West Makushita #1; 5–2	East Jūryō #11; 6–9	East Makushita #3; 4–3	West Makushita #2; 2–5	East Makushita #14; 3–4
1995	East Makushita #22; 6–1	East Makushita #8; 2–5	East Makushita #25; 3–4	West Makushita #36; 3–4	West Makushita #45; 5–2	East Makushita #28; Retired; 3–4
Record given as wins–losses–absences Top division champion Top division runner-up Retired Lower divisions Non-participation Sanshō key: F=Fighting spirit; O=Outstanding performance; T=Technique Also shown: ★=Kinboshi; P=Playoff(s); Divisions: Makuuchi — Jūryō — Makushita — Sandanme — Jonidan — Jonokuchi Makuuchi ranks: Yokozuna — Ōzeki — Sekiwake — Komusubi — Maegashira

== See also ==
- Glossary of sumo terms
- List of past sumo wrestlers
- List of sumo tournament second division champions
