= Musashimaru Kōyō =

American sumo wrestler

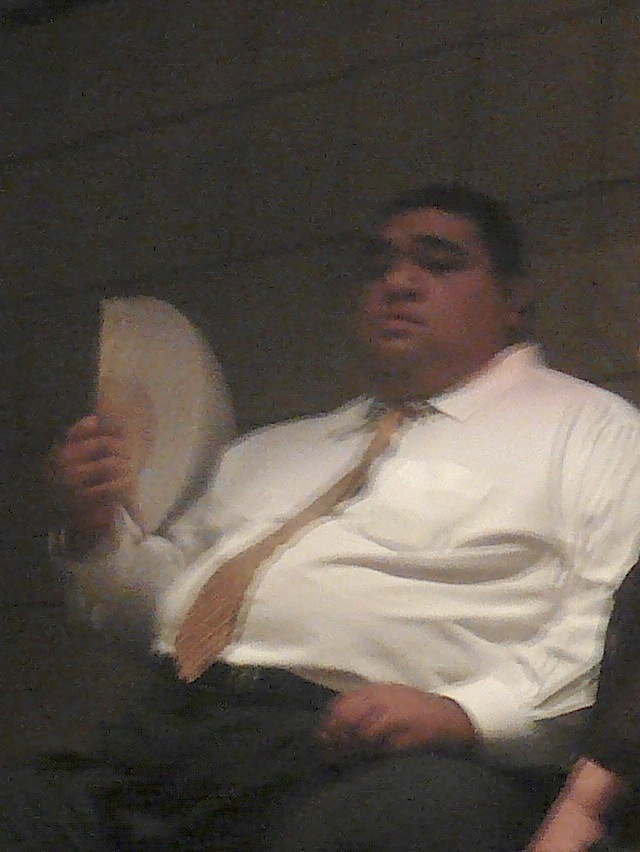
- Musashimaru watching a sumo match in 2007

Personal information
- Native name: 武蔵丸 光洋
- Born: Fiamalu Penitani; May 2, 1971 (age 55) American Samoa
- Height: 1.92 m (6 ft 3 1/2 in)
- Weight: 235 kg (518 lb; 37.0 st)

Sport
- Sport: Sumo
- Retired: November 2003
- Heya: Musashigawa
- Record: 779-294-115
- Debut: September 1989
- Highest rank: Yokozuna (May 1999)
- Elder name: Musashigawa
- Championships: 12 (Makuuchi); 1 (Jūryō); 1 (Sandanme); 1 Jonokuchi
- Special Prizes: Outstanding Performance (1); Fighting Spirit (1); Technique (2)
- Updated on August 2007

Musashimaru Kōyō (Japanese: 武蔵丸 光洋, Hepburn: Musashimaru Kōyō; born May 2, 1971, as Fiamalu Penitani) is an American-born Japanese-naturalized former professional sumo wrestler. He was born in American Samoa, before moving to Hawaii at the age of 10. At 18 he moved to Japan and made his professional sumo debut in 1989, reaching the top makuuchi division in 1991. After reaching the rank of ōzeki in 1994 his progress seemed to stall, but in 1999 he became only the second foreign-born wrestler in history to reach the sport's highest rank of yokozuna. Musashimaru won over 700 top division bouts and took twelve top division tournament championships during his career. His sheer 235 kg (518 lb) bulk combined with 1.92 m (6 ft 3 1/2 in) of height made him a formidable opponent, and he was remarkably consistent and injury-free for most of his career. An amiable personality, his fan base was helped by a surprising facial resemblance to Japanese warrior hero Saigō Takamori. After becoming a Japanese national in 1996 and retiring in 2003, he became an elder of the Japan Sumo Association and founded the Musashigawa stable in 2013.

== Early career ==
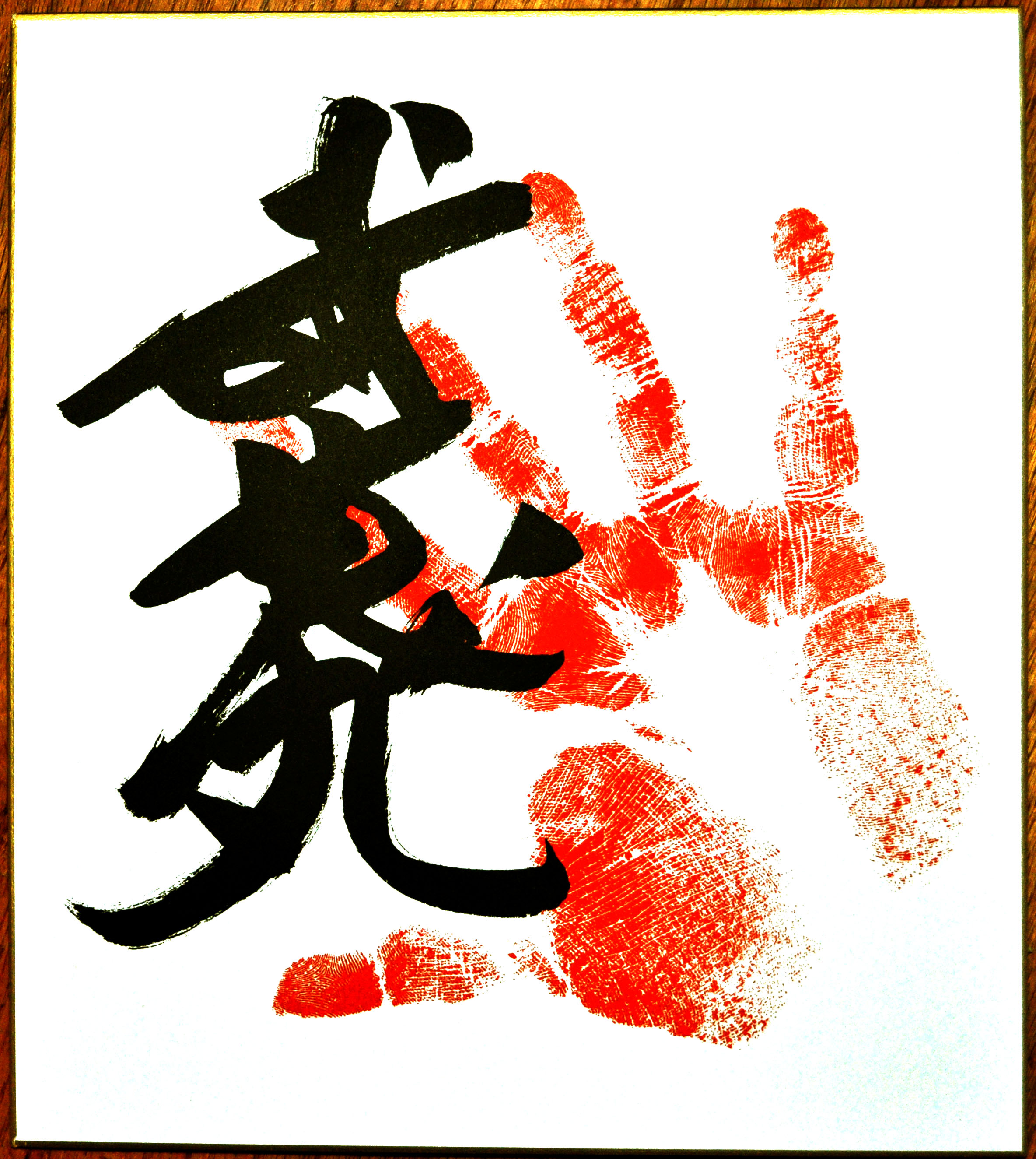
Tegata (hand print autograph) of Musashimaru

Fiamalu Penitani was born in American Samoa, the fourth son of a German Tongan father and a Portuguese Samoan mother. The family moved to Oahu, Hawaii when he was ten years old. While attending Waianae High School in Waianae he played American football and was offered a scholarship to Pasadena City College, but he also had success in Greco-Roman wrestling, and his wrestling coach encouraged him to give sumo a try. He moved to Japan and joined former yokozuna Mienoumi's Musashigawa stable in June 1989, initially on a trial basis only. This proved to be successful and he formally made his professional debut that September, adopting the shikona or ring name of Musashimaru Kōyō. He moved up the ranks quickly, becoming an elite sekitori wrestler in July 1991 upon promotion to the jūryō division. He reached the top makuuchi division just two tournaments later in November 1991. He made komusubi in May 1992 and sekiwake in July. After a superb 13–2 record and runner-up honors in November 1993, and a 12–3 score the following January, he was promoted to ōzeki alongside Takanonami.

== Ōzeki ==
Musashimaru was ranked as an ōzeki for 32 tournaments. He showed great consistency, never missing any bouts through injury and always getting at least eight wins. However, he was unable to gain the successive championships needed to become a yokozuna. Musashimaru took his first top division championship (yūshō) in July 1994 with a perfect 15–0 record, but in the following tournament he could manage only 11 wins and Takanohana overtook him to become yokozuna at the end of the year, joining Akebono who had become the first foreign born yokozuna in 1993. Musashimaru seemed content just to maintain his rank, not winning another title until November 1996. Takanohana was absent from this tournament and Musashimaru won it after a five way playoff with a score of 11–4, the lowest number of wins needed to take a top division title since 1972. His third championship came in January 1998.

== Yokozuna ==
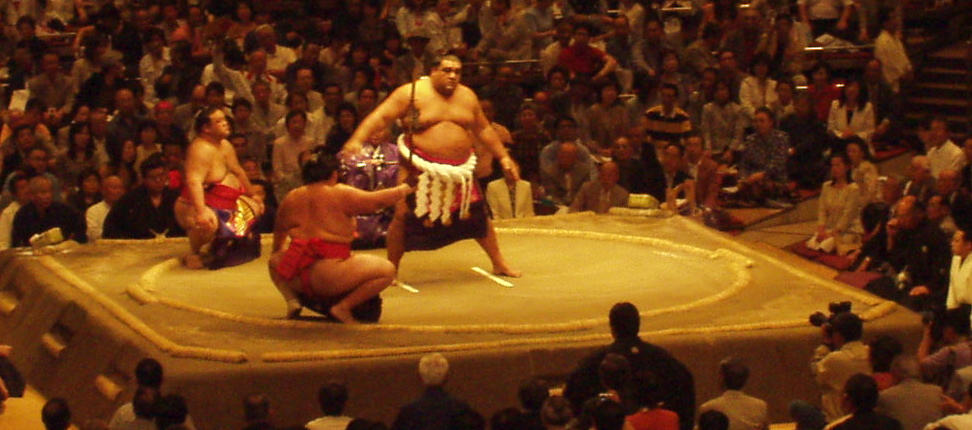
Musashimaru's ring entering ceremony at the May 2002 sumo tournament

In 1999, with Akebono and Takanohana both struggling with injury and loss of form, Musashimaru suddenly came alive with two consecutive tournament wins in March and May 1999 to earn promotion to yokozuna. There was little of the controversy that surrounded previous promotion drives by foreign wrestlers such as Konishiki, and Musashimaru's record of never having missed a bout in his career was praised by the Yokozuna Deliberation Council. After a respectable 12–3 performance in his yokozuna debut, he won two further titles that year. However, in January 2000 he had to pull out of the tournament with an injury on the fourth day, bringing to an end his record run of 55 consecutive tournaments with a majority of wins, dating from his 6–1 score in the makushita division in November 1990. This kachi-koshi run ended just one tournament short of Kitanoumi's top division record. Akebono returned to form in 2000, and Musashimaru was also sidelined with injury in May. He won just one title that year, in September, although it was one of his most impressive results as he won his first 14 matches, just failing on the last day to become the first wrestler in four years to win with a perfect record. In 2001, although he did not have the injury problems of the previous year, he lost two playoffs to Takanohana in January and May, and had a mere 9–6 record in September, giving away five kinboshi to maegashira ranked wrestlers, an all-time record for a single tournament. He had to wait until November 2001 for his ninth title. In 2002, with Takanohana sidelined through injury, Musashimaru was dominant. Although he missed most of the January 2002 tournament after injuring himself against Kyokushūzan on the third day, he won three tournaments that year, making 2002 his most successful year since 1999. His victory over the returning Takanohana in September 2002 was his twelfth and final championship and was also the last time either man would complete a tournament, making it the end of an era.

== Retirement from sumo ==
In November 2002 Musashimaru tore a tendon in his left wrist, an injury which proved to be career-ending. Forced to withdraw from that tournament, the chronic problem restricted him to just a handful of appearances in the whole of 2003. Overshadowed by new yokozuna Asashōryū, he entered the July tournament but pulled out after just six days. He did not compete again until November, when after suffering his fourth defeat on the seventh day, he announced his retirement. In an interview on November 16, 2003, he revealed that he had also injured his neck while playing American football in high school and had been unable to move his left shoulder properly. Musashimaru was the last Hawaiian wrestler in sumo, ending a dynasty that began with Takamiyama in 1964 and at one point in 1996 saw four from the islands ranked in the top division. During his career he had won a total of twelve top division championships, one more than Akebono, and also won over 700 top division bouts, one of only six wrestlers to have achieved that feat to date. He officially retired on October 2, 2004, when he had his danpatsu-shiki, or retirement ceremony, at the Ryōgoku Kokugikan.

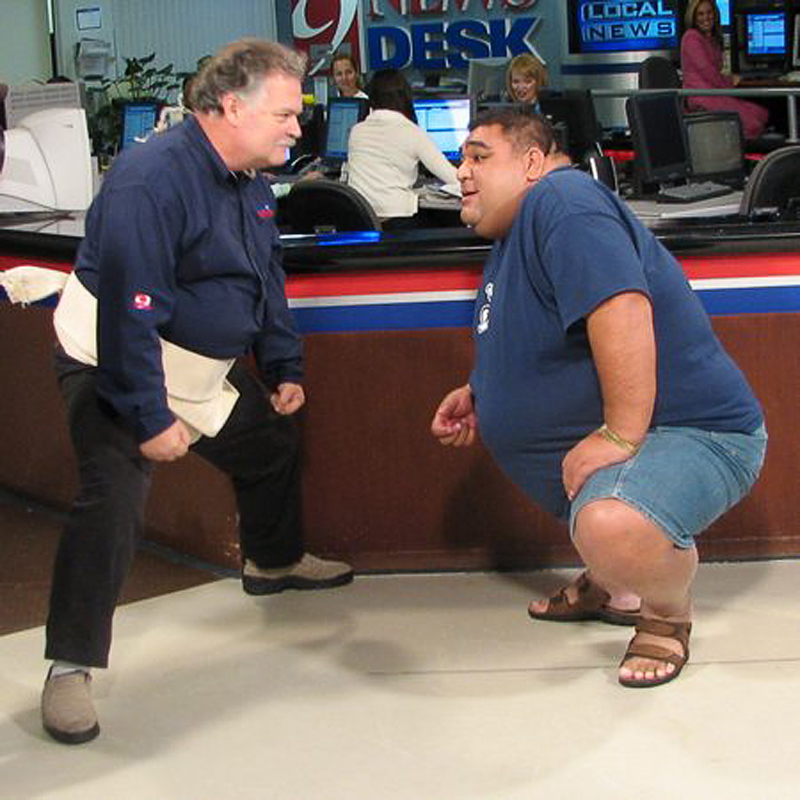
Appearing on KUSI with Phil Konstantin in 2005

Musashimaru has remained in the sumo world as an oyakata, or coach. He did not initially acquire a permanent elder (toshiyori) name, going instead under the name of Musashimaru Oyakata, which as a former yokozuna he was entitled to do for a period of five years after retirement. In October 2008 he began using the name Furiwake (振分), and he then switched to the Ōshima (大島) elder name of former ozeki Asahikuni in August 2012. In December 2012 it was announced that he would inherit the prestigious Musashigawa (武蔵川) name upon his old stablemaster's retirement in February 2013, at which time he opened his own stable of wrestlers, Musashigawa. This is not to be confused with the stable he fought out of as an active wrestler, which has since been renamed Fujishima stable. The stable had 19 wrestlers as of May 2021, and had previously included his nephew, who reached the makushita division and became the highest-ranking member of the stable before retiring in 2019.

He appeared alongside Brad Pitt (who was playing his personal assistant) in two commercials for Softbank, a Japanese mobile phone company, in July 2009. They were directed by Spike Jonze.

== Personal life ==
Musashimaru became a Japanese citizen on January 22, 1996. He took his shikona as his legal name. In April 2008, he married a hula dance instructor from Tokyo and the wedding ceremony took place that August in Hawaii. The couple have one son, Joey, born on June 28, 2014. Two of his nephews became wrestlers in his stable. The first, Fiamalu Musashimaru Penitani, turned professional in 2013 under the shikona (ring name) of Musashikuni before retiring in 2019. In October 2024, it was announced that Musashikuni's younger brother, Daniel Ailua, would also take the physical test at age 18 to become a professional wrestler, with his debut scheduled for January 2025.

In April 2017, Musashimaru fell ill while golfing in Nara and underwent a kidney transplant, with his wife as the donor.

== Fighting style ==
In addition to his great size and strength, Musashimaru had a low center of gravity and excellent balance, which made him very difficult to beat. Earlier in his career he favored pushing and thrusting (tsuki/oshi) techniques, but he also began to fight more on the mawashi, simply wearing his smaller opponents out with his huge inertia. He usually used a migi-yotsu (left hand outside, right hand inside) grip. His most common winning technique or kimarite was oshidashi (push out), closely followed by yorikiri (force out). Together these two techniques accounted for about 60 percent of his career wins.

== Career record ==
Musashimaru Kōyō
Year	January Hatsu basho, Tokyo	March Haru basho, Osaka	May Natsu basho, Tokyo	July Nagoya basho, Nagoya	September Aki basho, Tokyo	November Kyūshū basho, Fukuoka
1989	x	x	x	x	(Maezumo)	West Jonokuchi #41; 7–0; Champion
1990	East Jonidan #56; 6–1	West Sandanme #94; 6–1	East Sandanme #40; 7–0–P; Champion	East Makushita #25; 5–2	West Makushita #11; 2–5	West Makushita #24; 6–1
1991	East Makushita #9; 4–3	West Makushita #4; 4–3	East Makushita #1; 5–2	East Jūryō #11; 11–4; Champion	East Jūryō #3; 10–5	East Maegashira #12; 11–4; F
1992	East Maegashira #3; 9–6	West Maegashira #1; 9–6	West Komusubi #2; 8–7	East Komusubi #1; 11–4; T	West Sekiwake #1; 10–5	East Sekiwake #1; 9–6
1993	East Sekiwake #2; 10–5	East Sekiwake #1; 10–5	East Sekiwake #1; 9–6	West Sekiwake #1; 8–7	East Sekiwake #1; 8–7	West Sekiwake #2; 13–2–P; O
1994	East Sekiwake #1; 12–3; T	West Ōzeki #2; 9–6	East Ōzeki #2; 12–3	West Ōzeki #1; 15–0	East Ōzeki #1; 11–4	West Ōzeki #2; 12–3
1995	West Ōzeki #1; 13–2–P	East Ōzeki #1; 12–3	East Ōzeki #1; 12–3	East Ōzeki #1; 12–3	East Ōzeki #1; 10–5	East Ōzeki #1; 10–5
1996	West Ōzeki #1; 9–6	West Ōzeki #1; 9–6	East Ōzeki #2; 9–6	East Ōzeki #2; 10–5	East Ōzeki #2; 11–4	West Ōzeki; 11–4–PPP
1997	West Ōzeki #1; 12–3	West Ōzeki #1; 12–3–P	East Ōzeki #1; 9–6	West Ōzeki #1; 10–5	East Ōzeki #1; 13–2–P	East Ōzeki #1; 12–3
1998	West Ōzeki #1; 12–3	East Ōzeki #1; 8–7	West Ōzeki #1; 10–5	West Ōzeki #1; 12–3	East Ōzeki #1; 11–4	East Ōzeki #1; 11–4
1999	East Ōzeki #1; 8–7	East Ōzeki #1; 13–2	East Ōzeki #1; 13–2	West Yokozuna #1; 12–3	West Yokozuna #1; 12–3	East Yokozuna #1; 12–3
2000	East Yokozuna #1; 2–2–11	East Yokozuna #2; 11–4	East Yokozuna #2; Sat out due to injury 0–0–15	East Yokozuna #2; 10–5	West Yokozuna #1; 14–1	East Yokozuna #1; 11–4
2001	West Yokozuna #1; 14–1–P	West Yokozuna #1; 12–3	West Yokozuna #1; 13–2–P	West Yokozuna #1; 12–3	East Yokozuna #1; 9–6	East Yokozuna #1; 13–2
2002	East Yokozuna #1; 1–3–11	East Yokozuna #1; 13–2	East Yokozuna #1; 13–2	East Yokozuna #1; 10–5	East Yokozuna #1; 13–2	East Yokozuna #1; 4–2–9
2003	East Yokozuna #1; Sat out due to injury 0–0–15	East Yokozuna #1; Sat out due to injury 0–0–15	West Yokozuna #1; Sat out due to injury 0–0–15	West Yokozuna #1; 2–4–9	West Yokozuna #1; Sat out due to injury 0–0–15	West Yokozuna #1; Retired; 3–5
Record given as wins–losses–absences Top division champion Top division runner-up Retired Lower divisions Non-participation Sanshō key: F=Fighting spirit; O=Outstanding performance; T=Technique Also shown: ★=Kinboshi; P=Playoff(s); Divisions: Makuuchi — Jūryō — Makushita — Sandanme — Jonidan — Jonokuchi Makuuchi ranks: Yokozuna — Ōzeki — Sekiwake — Komusubi — Maegashira

== See also ==
- List of yokozuna
- List of sumo tournament top division champions
- List of sumo tournament top division runners-up
- List of sumo tournament second division champions
- List of sumo record holders
- Glossary of sumo terms
- List of non-Japanese sumo wrestlers
- List of heaviest sumo wrestlers
- List of past sumo wrestlers
- List of sumo elders

Preceded by Wakanohana Masaru	67th Yokozuna; 1999–2003	Succeeded by Asashōryū Akinori
Yokozuna is not a successive rank, and more than one wrestler can hold the title at once
