= Daiki =

- Gender: Male

Origin
- Origin: Japanese
- Meaning: Different meanings depending on the kanji used

Daiki (written: 大樹, 大輝, 大貴, 大生, 大己, 大毅, 大基, 大器, 大起, 大希, 大暉 or 大幾) is a masculine Japanese given name. Notable people with the name include:

- Daiki Arioka (有岡 大貴; born 1991), Japanese idol, singer and actor
- Daiki Asada (浅田 大樹; born 1989), Japanese footballer
- Daiki Asama (淺間 大基; born 1996), Japanese baseball player
- Chiyohakuhō Daiki (千代白鵬 大樹; born 1983), Japanese sumo wrestler
- Daiki Deoka (出岡 大輝; born 1994), Japanese footballer
- Daiki Enokida (榎田 大樹; born 1986), Japanese baseball player
- Daiki Enomoto (榎本 大輝; born 1996), Japanese footballer
- Daiki Hamano (濱野 大輝; born 1989), Japanese voice actor
- Daiki Hashimoto (橋本 大輝; born 2001), Japanese artistic gymnast
- Daiki Hashioka (橋岡 大樹; born 1999), Japanese footballer
- Daiki Hata (畑 大樹; born 1982), Japanese mixed martial artist
- Daiki Hattori (服部 大樹; born 1987), Japanese footballer
- Hokutofuji Daiki (北勝富士 大輝; born 1992), Japanese sumo wrestler
- Daiki Hotta (堀田 大暉; born 1994), Japanese footballer
- Daiki Inaba (稲葉 大樹; born 1988), Japanese professional wrestler
- Daiki Ito (伊東 大貴; born 1985), Japanese ski jumper
- Daiki Iwamasa (岩政 大樹; born 1982), Japanese footballer
- Daiki Kameda (亀田 大毅; born 1989), Japanese boxer
- Daiki Kamikawa (上川 大樹; born 1989), Japanese judoka
- Daiki Kanei (金井 大樹; born 1987), Japanese footballer
- Daiki Kaneko (金子 大毅; born 1998), Japanese footballer
- Daiki Kasho (嘉生 大樹; born 1976), Japanese video game composer
- Daiki Kobayashi (小林 大紀; born 1991), Japanese voice actor and singer
- Daiki Kogure (小暮 大器; born 1994), Japanese footballer
- Daiki Matsumoto (松本 大輝; born 1991), Japanese footballer
- Daiki Matsuoka (松岡 大起; born 2001), Japanese footballer
- Daiki Michishita (道下 大樹; born 1975), Japanese politician
- Daiki Miya (宮 大樹; born 1996), Japanese footballer
- Daiki Nakamura (中村 大樹; born 1962), Japanese voice actor
- Daiki Nishioka (西岡 大輝; born 1988), Japanese footballer
- Daiki Nishiyama (西山 大希; born 1990), Japanese judoka
- Daiki Niwa (footballer) (丹羽 大輝; born 1986), Japanese footballer
- Daiki Numa (沼 大希; born 1997), Japanese footballer
- Daiki Ogawa (小川 大貴; born 1991), Japanese footballer
- Daiki Oizumi (尾泉 大樹; born 1989), Japanese footballer
- Daiki Sasaki (佐々木 大樹; born 1991), Japanese racing driver
- Daiki Sato (佐藤 大基; 1988–2010), Japanese footballer
- Daiki Shigeoka (重岡 大毅; born 1991), Japanese idol, singer and actor
- Daiki Suga (菅 大輝; born 1998), Japanese footballer
- Daiki Sugioka (杉岡 大暉; born 1998), Japanese footballer
- Daiki Suzuki, Japanese-born American fashion designer
- Daiki Tajima (田嶋 大樹; born 1996), Japanese baseball player
- Daiki Takamatsu (高松 大樹; born 1981), Japanese footballer
- Daiki Tamori (田森 大己; born 1983), Japanese footballer
- Daiki Tanaka (田中 大貴; born 1991), Japanese basketball player
- Daiki Tohmei (東明 大貴; born 1989), Japanese baseball player
- Daiki Tomii (富居 大樹; born 1989), Japanese footballer
- Toyonoshima Daiki (豊ノ島 大樹; born 1983), Japanese sumo wrestler
- Daiki Umei (梅井 大輝; born 1989), Japanese footballer
- Daiki Wakamatsu (若松 大樹; born 1976), Japanese footballer
- Daiki Watari (渡 大生; born 1993), Japanese footballer
- Daiki Yagishita (柳下 大樹; born 1995), Japanese footballer
- Daiki Yamamoto (山本 大稀; born 1992), Japanese footballer
- Daiki Yamashita (山下 大輝; born 1989), Japanese voice actor
- Daiki Yoshikawa (吉川 大幾; born 1992), Japanese baseball player

== Fictional characters ==
- Daiki Aomine (青峰 大輝), a character from Kuroko's Basketball
- Daiki Sendō (仙道 ダイキ), a character from Little Battlers Experience

== See also ==
- 9225 Daiki, a main-belt minor planet
