= Aogiyama Hideki =

Japanese sumo wrestler (born 1970)

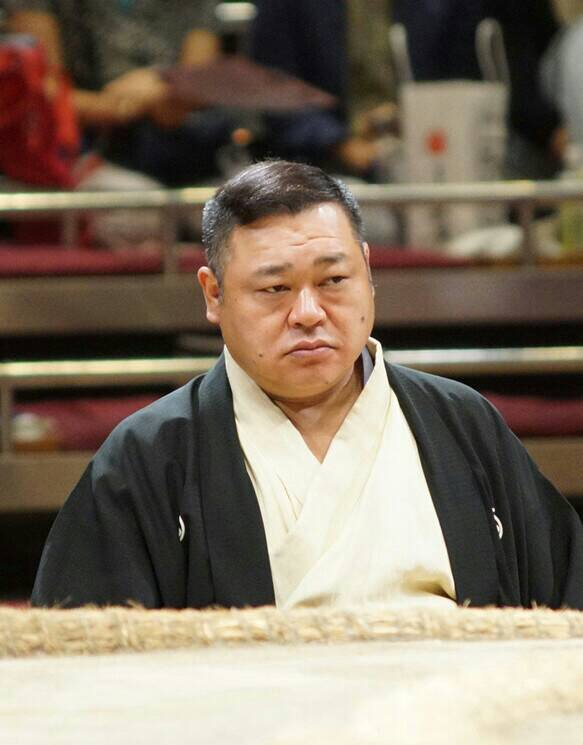

Personal information
- Native name: 蒼樹山 秀樹
- Born: Hideki Teraki; 18 February 1970 (age 56) Hikone, Shiga, Japan
- Height: 1.82 m (5 ft 11 1/2 in)
- Weight: 148 kg (326 lb)

Sport
- Sport: Sumo
- Retired: November, 2003
- Heya: Tokitsukaze
- Record: 628-645-79
- Debut: March, 1985
- Highest rank: Maegashira 1 (July, 1996)
- Elder name: Edagawa
- Championships: 2 (Jūryō)
- Special Prizes: Fighting Spirit (1)
- Gold Stars: 2 (Takanohana II)
- Updated on Sep. 2012

Aogiyama Hideki (born 18 February 1970 as Hideki Teraki) is a former sumo wrestler from Hikone, Shiga, Japan. He made his professional debut in March 1985, and reached the top division in March 1993. His highest rank was maegashira 1. He retired in November 2003, and he is an elder in the Japan Sumo Association under the name Edagawa.

== Career ==
He was born in the city of Hikone in Shiga Prefecture, the second son of a restaurant owner. He played baseball in his youth but decided to join professional sumo after his elder brother, who had joined Tokitsukaze stable a year previously, quit sumo. He had an inauspicious debut, losing all three maezumo bouts in March 1985 and then all seven bouts in his first official tournament appearance in the lowest jonokuchi division in the following tournament in March. He missed two tournaments from injury in July and September 1989 which saw him fall from the makushita division to the sandanme division, but upon his return he rose steadily up makushita and was promoted to sekitori status in November 1991 upon reaching the juryo division. To mark the occasion he changed his shikona or fighting name from his own surname of Teraki to Aogiyama. His first tournament in juryo was unsuccessful but he returned to the division in May 1992 and in January 1993 he won his first yusho or tournament championship with an 11–4 record. This saw him promoted to the top makuuchi division for the March 1993 tournament. However, he could score only six wins against nine losses in his top division debut and he also failed to win a majority of bouts in two subsequent attempts in makuuchi in July 1993 and March 1994. He did not establish himself as a top division regular until his fourth promotion to the division in November 1995. He reached what was to be his highest rank of maegashira 1 in July 1996. He won two kinboshi for defeating yokozuna Takanohana in the July 1997 and January 1998 tourneys. Takanohana subsequently withdrew from the latter tournament, and Aogiyama was asked to take part in the sanyaku soroibumi ritual on the final day even though he was not ranked in sanyaku himself, because of a shortage of available wrestlers – an unusual occurrence. In the following March 1998 tournament he won the Fighting Spirit Award for his strong 11–4 record.

Aogiyama missed the March 2000 tournament after rupturing his Achilles tendon, and after two losing scores upon his return he was demoted back to juryo after a run of 29 straight tournaments ranked in the top division. He returned to the maegashira ranks in September 2001 after taking his second juryo championship with a 12–3 record, but he was finding it more difficult to hold his own in makuuchi. His 38th and final top division tournament was in July 2003, and his overall record in makuuchi was 223 wins against 314 losses, with 33 absences due to injury.

== Retirement from sumo ==
He announced his retirement from sumo on the tenth day of the November 2003 tournament, having lost all nine of his previous matches and facing demotion to the makushita division. He remained in sumo as an elder of the Japan Sumo Association under the name Edagawa, which was formerly owned by ex-ozeki Kitabayama of the Tokitsukaze stable and was being borrowed by the former Zaonishiki. His danpatsu-shiki or official retirement ceremony took place on October 3, 2004, at the Ryogoku Kokugikan with around 320 guests taking part in the hair-cutting ritual. Edagawa works as a coach at Tokitsukaze stable and in the jungyo (regional tour) department of the Sumo Association, and regularly tours the country promoting jungyo events. From March 2012 he has also worked as a judge of tournament bouts. He was seen as a candidate to take over the running of Tokitsukaze stable in 2007 when the previous head coach, the former Futatsuryū, was dismissed as an elder in the stable's hazing scandal, but instead the job went to Tokitsuumi who retired from active competition. It is unknown whether Edagawa personally declined or was passed over for the role.

He stood in for Tokitsukaze Oyakata in September 2020 when two Sumo Association directors visited the stable to inform Shōdai of his promotion to ōzeki, due to the stablemaster's illness.

== Fighting style ==
Aogiyama was an oshi-sumo specialist who preferred pushing and thrusting techniques to fighting on the mawashi or belt. As well as a straightforward oshi-dashi or push out he also regularly used hiki-otoshi, the pull down and hataki-komi, the slap down.

== Personal life ==
He is a fan of the Hanshin Tigers, and his other interests include pachinko, video games and listening to music.

== Career record ==
Aogiyama Hideki
| Year | January Hatsu basho, Tokyo | March Haru basho, Osaka | May Natsu basho, Tokyo | July Nagoya basho, Nagoya | September Aki basho, Tokyo | November Kyūshū basho, Fukuoka |
|---|---|---|---|---|---|---|
| 1985 | x | (Maezumo) | East Jonokuchi #25; 0–7 | West Jonokuchi #54; 3–4 | East Jonokuchi #39; 4–3 | East Jonokuchi #11; 3–4 |
| 1986 | East Jonokuchi #20; 4–3 | East Jonidan #125; 2–5 | West Jonidan #145; 4–3 | East Jonidan #96; 3–4 | West Jonidan #111; 5–2 | West Jonidan #62; 3–4 |
| 1987 | East Jonidan #79; 4–3 | West Jonidan #51; 3–4 | East Jonidan #71; 5–2 | East Jonidan #33; 5–2 | West Jonidan #5; 3–4 | East Jonidan #18; 6–1 |
| 1988 | West Sandanme #66; 5–2 | West Sandanme #351; 3–4 | West Sandanme #53; 4–3 | West Sandanme #35; 4–3 | West Sandanme #19; 5–2 | East Makushita #53; 3–4 |
| 1989 | West Sandanme #5; 3–4 | West Sandanme #18; 4–3 | West Sandanme #3; 4–3 | East Makushita #50; Sat out due to injury 0–0–7 | West Sandanme #30; Sat out due to injury 0–0–7 | East Sandanme #91; 4–0–3 |
| 1990 | West Sandanme #64; 6–1 | East Sandanme #16; 6–1 | East Makushita #43; 6–1–PP | East Makushita #20; 4–3 | East Makushita #15; 5–2 | East Makushita #6; 2–5 |
| 1991 | West Makushita #19; 1–6 | East Makushita #45; 5–2 | West Makushita #28; 5–2 | West Makushita #15; 5–2 | West Makushita #6; 5–2 | East Jūryō #13; 4–11 |
| 1992 | West Makushita #6; 4–3 | East Makushita #3; 5–2 | West Jūryō #12; 10–5 | East Jūryō #4; 8–7 | West Jūryō #2; 7–8 | East Jūryō #4; Sat out due to injury 0–0–15 |
| 1993 | East Jūryō #4; 11–4; Champion | East Maegashira #13; 6–9 | East Jūryō #2; 9–6 | West Maegashira #15; 5–10 | East Jūryō #5; 9–6 | East Jūryō #2; 9–6 |
| 1994 | West Jūryō #1; 9–6 | East Maegashira #16; 4–11 | East Jūryō #7; 11–4 | East Jūryō #1; 7–8 | East Jūryō #4; 5–4–6 | West Jūryō #9; 9–6 |
| 1995 | East Jūryō #4; 8–7 | East Jūryō #3; 7–8 | West Jūryō #5; 8–7 | West Jūryō #3; 9–6 | East Jūryō #1; 8–7 | West Maegashira #15; 9–6 |
| 1996 | West Maegashira #11; 8–7 | West Maegashira #2; 4–11 | West Maegashira #7; 8–7 | West Maegashira #1; 3–12 | East Maegashira #6; 6–9 | East Maegashira #10; 8–7 |
| 1997 | East Maegashira #7; 6–9 | East Maegashira #11; 8–7 | West Maegashira #6; 8–7 | East Maegashira #2; 6–9 ★ | East Maegashira #4; 3–12 | East Maegashira #10; 8–7 |
| 1998 | West Maegashira #5; 6–9 ★ | West Maegashira #7; 11–4; F | West Maegashira #1; 3–12 | West Maegashira #8; 8–7 | East Maegashira #4; 5–10 | East Maegashira #7; 8–7 |
| 1999 | West Maegashira #3; 4–11 | East Maegashira #8; 8–7 | West Maegashira #4; 7–8 | East Maegashira #5; 5–10 | West Maegashira #8; 8–7 | West Maegashira #4; 6–9 |
| 2000 | West Maegashira #6; 4–10–1 | East Maegashira #13; Sat out due to injury 0–0–15 | East Maegashira #13; 7–8 | East Maegashira #14; 6–9 | West Jūryō #3; 7–8 | East Jūryō #6; 5–10 |
| 2001 | West Jūryō #10; 10–5 | West Jūryō #2; 8–4–3 | East Jūryō #2; 5–10 | West Jūryō #7; 8–7 | West Jūryō #5; 12–3–P; Champion | East Maegashira #13; 4–11 |
| 2002 | East Jūryō #4; 6–9 | East Jūryō #7; 8–7 | East Jūryō #3; 10–5 | West Maegashira #12; 6–7–2 | West Maegashira #14; Sat out due to injury 0–0–15 | West Maegashira #14; 6–9 |
| 2003 | West Jūryō #2; 7–8 | West Jūryō #3; 10–5–P | West Maegashira #12; 7–8 | West Maegashira #14; 4–11 | East Jūryō #6; 6–9 | West Jūryō #8; Retired; 0–10–5 |
Record given as wins–losses–absences Top division champion Top division runner-up Retired Lower divisions Non-participation Sanshō key: F=Fighting spirit; O=Outstanding performance; T=Technique Also shown: ★=Kinboshi; P=Playoff(s); Divisions: Makuuchi — Jūryō — Makushita — Sandanme — Jonidan — Jonokuchi Makuuchi ranks: Yokozuna — Ōzeki — Sekiwake — Komusubi — Maegashira

== See also ==
- Glossary of sumo terms
- List of sumo tournament second division champions
- List of past sumo wrestlers
- List of sumo elders
