= Asanowaka Takehiko =

Japanese sumo wrestler

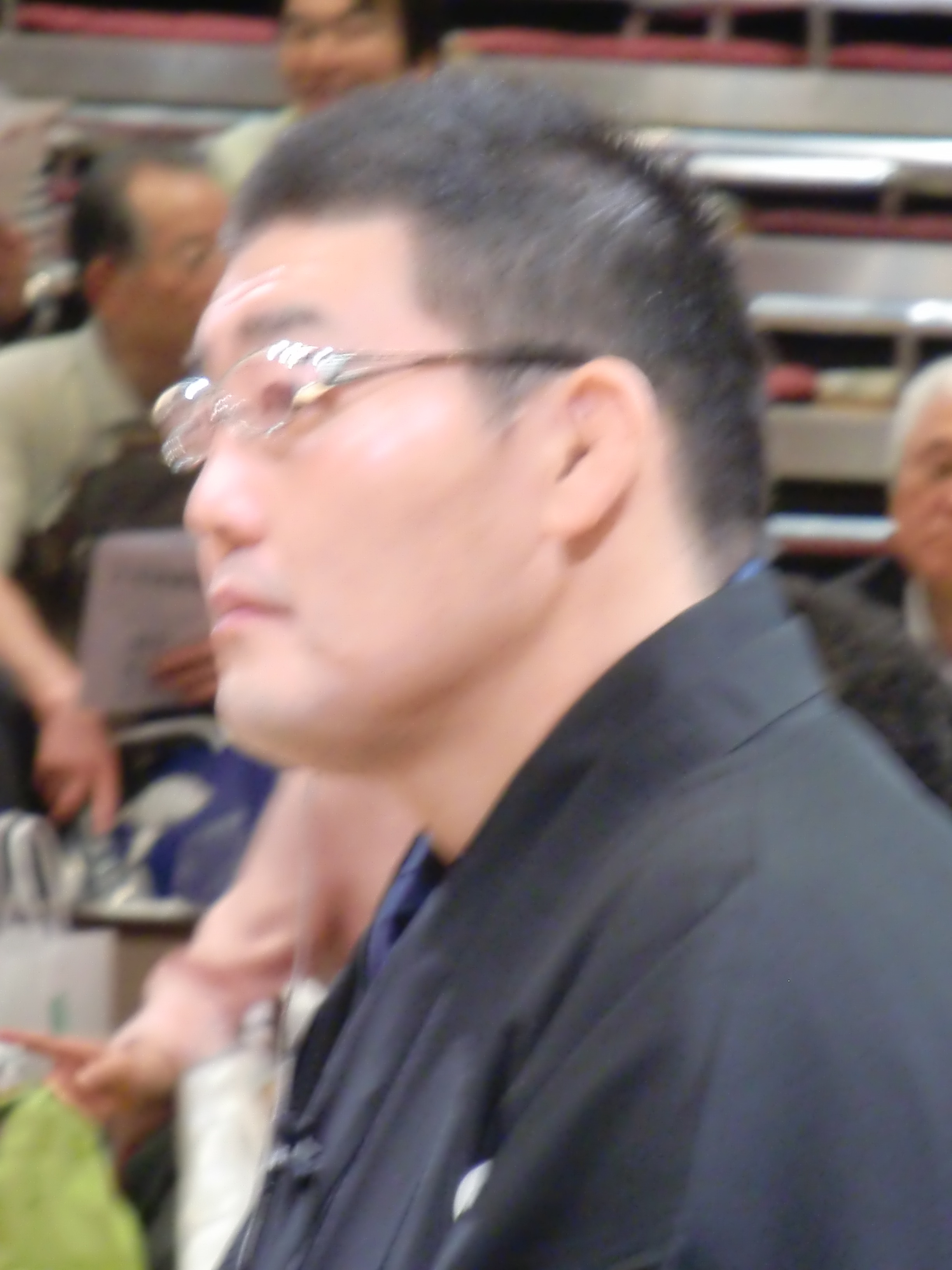

Personal information
- Native name: 朝乃若武彦
- Born: Takehiko Adachi; 11 December 1969 (age 56) Aichi, Japan
- Height: 1.76 m (5 ft 9 1/2 in)
- Weight: 144 kg (317 lb)

Sport
- Sport: Sumo
- University team: Kinki University
- Retired: May, 2005
- Heya: Wakamatsu → Takasago
- Record: 547-598
- Debut: March, 1992
- Highest rank: Maegashira 1
- Elder name: Wakamatsu
- Championships: 1 (Jūryō); 1 (Makushita)
- Updated on May, 2008

Asanowaka Takehiko (born 11 December 1969 as Takehiko Adachi) is a former sumo wrestler from Ichinomiya, Aichi Prefecture, Japan. His highest rank was maegashira 1. He is now a sumo coach.

== Career ==
He was an amateur sumo competitor at Kinki University, although he never won any titles. He was recruited by ex-ōzeki Asashio (himself a former collegiate competitor) and joined Wakamatsu stable (later Takasago stable) in March 1992. He began as a makushita tsukedashi, meaning he could make his debut at the bottom of the third makushita division. He was promoted to the second jūryō division in January 1993 and captured the tournament championship in that division in November 1993 with a score of 11-4. Following a 9-6 in January 1994 he was promoted to the top makuuchi division in March of that year.

Asanowaka never managed to reach the titled san'yaku ranks or win a special prize. He was also unable to defeat any yokozuna and had only one win against an ōzeki (Takanonami in May 1997). Nevertheless, he fought in the top division off and on for ten years and his record of 346 wins there is the best amongst maegashira only wrestlers. He was also very popular with tournament crowds. At the peak of his career he wore an outlandish bright yellow mawashi and would enliven the preliminaries by throwing the purifying salt in a manner that resembled an American football player scoring a touchdown. He would also crouch extremely low to the ground when doing the warm up or shikiri. Eventually he was instructed by the Japan Sumo Association to tone these antics down and in his later years on the dohyō wore a black mawashi and was much more subdued.

== Retirement from sumo ==
By 2004 Asanowaka was no longer able to hold his own in the top division, and after a disastrous 1-14 score in the jūryō division in March 2005, he announced his retirement the following month. He had not missed a single bout in his career. He has remained in the sumo world as an elder, affiliated to the Takasago stable, and is now known as Wakamatsu Oyakata. He became a deputy director of the Sumo Association in 2020. He was reportedly in the running to take over Takasago stable following the retirement of his former stablemaster, the ex-Asashio Tarō IV, in December 2020, but lost out to the former Asasekiryū, another coach at the stable. In September 2021 Takasago stable's Terasawa was promoted to jūryō and, with the coach's approval, changed his shikona to Asanowaka, because Asanowaka's record of going all out and never missing a bout stood in contrast to Terusawa's own injury record.

== Fighting style ==
Asanowaka was of a short build for a sumo wrestler and had limited technique, relying heavily on slap-downs and henka. He sidestepped so regularly at the tachi-ai that he was criticized by sumo elders. He was a pusher-thruster, rarely fighting on the mawashi or belt. His most common winning kimarite was oshidashi (push out), followed by hiki-otoshi (pull down) and hataki-komi (slap down). He won only six career bouts by yori-kiri (force out) and was only credited once with a belt throw (an uwatenage in 2001). He was known for his powerful legs developed through relentless training, and he had no serious injuries in his career.

== Personal life ==
Asanowaka married in February 2000 and his wife gave birth to a baby girl in September of that year. The couple's wedding reception was held in January 2001.

== Career record ==
Asanowaka Takehiko
Year	January Hatsu basho, Tokyo	March Haru basho, Osaka	May Natsu basho, Tokyo	July Nagoya basho, Nagoya	September Aki basho, Tokyo	November Kyūshū basho, Fukuoka
1992	x	Makushita tsukedashi #60; 5–2	East Makushita #42; 5–2	East Makushita #23; 7–0; Champion	East Makushita #4; 4–3	West Makushita #2; 6–1
1993	East Jūryō #11; 10–5	East Jūryō #4; 4–11	West Jūryō #12; 9–6	East Jūryō #9; 8–7	West Jūryō #8; 9–6	West Jūryō #4; 11–4–P; Champion
1994	East Jūryō #1; 9–6	East Maegashira #15; 9–6	East Maegashira #11; 8–7	West Maegashira #5; 6–9	West Maegashira #9; 7–8	West Maegashira #12; 8–7
1995	West Maegashira #10; 9–6	West Maegashira #2; 6–9	West Maegashira #5; 5–10	West Maegashira #10; 8–7	West Maegashira #3; 4–11	West Maegashira #9; 7–8
1996	West Maegashira #12; 8–7	East Maegashira #5; 4–11	East Maegashira #12; 9–6	West Maegashira #9; 8–7	East Maegashira #5; 4–11	East Maegashira #11; 9–6
1997	East Maegashira #5; 5–10	East Maegashira #9; 8–7	East Maegashira #4; 5–10	East Maegashira #8; 7–8	East Maegashira #10; 7–8	West Maegashira #13; 8–7
1998	East Maegashira #12; 7–8	West Maegashira #15; 8–7	East Maegashira #13; 7–8	East Maegashira #16; 8–7	West Maegashira #12; 7–8	East Maegashira #15; 6–9
1999	East Jūryō #2; 9–6	East Maegashira #13; 6–9	West Jūryō #3; 8–7	West Jūryō #2; 8–7	West Maegashira #14; 9–6	East Maegashira #9; 9–6
2000	West Maegashira #2; 3–12	East Maegashira #8; 8–7	West Maegashira #1; 5–10	West Maegashira #3; 5–10	West Maegashira #8; 6–9	West Maegashira #11; 6–9
2001	East Maegashira #14; 8–7	West Maegashira #10; 7–8	West Maegashira #11; 7–8	East Maegashira #13; 5–10	East Jūryō #4; 8–7	West Jūryō #1; 9–6
2002	West Maegashira #12; 3–12	West Jūryō #5; 10–5	West Maegashira #15; 6–9	West Jūryō #2; 9–6	West Maegashira #13; 7–8	East Maegashira #15; 5–10
2003	East Jūryō #5; 8–7	East Jūryō #3; 9–6	East Maegashira #15; 8–7	East Maegashira #11; 6–9	East Maegashira #14; 6–9	East Jūryō #3; 9–6
2004	East Maegashira #16; 10–5	East Maegashira #11; 5–10	West Maegashira #14; 4–11	West Jūryō #3; 5–10	West Jūryō #8; 8–7	West Jūryō #6; 4–11
2005	West Jūryō #11; 9–6	West Jūryō #5; 1–14	West Makushita #3; Retired –	x	x	x
Record given as wins–losses–absences Top division champion Top division runner-up Retired Lower divisions Non-participation Sanshō key: F=Fighting spirit; O=Outstanding performance; T=Technique Also shown: ★=Kinboshi; P=Playoff(s); Divisions: Makuuchi — Jūryō — Makushita — Sandanme — Jonidan — Jonokuchi Makuuchi ranks: Yokozuna — Ōzeki — Sekiwake — Komusubi — Maegashira

== See also ==
- Glossary of sumo terms
- List of sumo tournament second division champions
- List of past sumo wrestlers
- List of sumo elders
