= Daiki Hattori =

Japanese footballer

Personal information
- Full name: Daiki Hattori
- Date of birth: October 17, 1987 (age 39)
- Place of birth: Aichi, Japan
- Height: 1.82 m (5 ft 11 1/2 in)
- Position: Defender

Youth career
- 2006–2009: Waseda University

Senior career*
Years	Team	Apps	(Gls)
2010–2015	YSCC Yokohama	108	(5)
Total		108	(5)
- * Club domestic league appearances and goals

Daiki Hattori (服部 大樹, Hattori Daiki; born October 17, 1987) is a former Japanese football player.

== Playing career ==
Daiki Hattori played for YSCC Yokohama from 2010 to 2015.
