= 1996 in sumo =

In 1996, the Kyushu Grand Sumo Tournament set a record for the number of wrestlers in a playoff, after Musashimaru, Akebono, Wakanohana, Takanonami, and Kaio, all tied at 11–4. Musashimaru won the historic five-way playoff, taking his second tournament title since July 1994.

The following are the events in professional sumo during 1996.

== Tournaments ==
=== Hatsu basho ===
Ryogoku Kokugikan, Tokyo, 7 January – 21 January

1996 Hatsu basho results - Makuuchi Division
W		L		A	East			Rank	West			W		L		A
14	-	1	-	0		(Japan)	**Takanohana**	Y	ø	(United States)	Akebono	0	-	3	-	12
0	-	4	-	11	ø	(Japan)	Wakanohana	O		(United States)	**Musashimaru**	9	-	6	-	0
14	-	1	-	0		(Japan)	**Takanonami***	O	ø							
10	-	5	-	0		(Japan)	**Kaiō**	S		(Japan)	**Kotonishiki**	9	-	6	-	0
8	-	7	-	0		(Japan)	**Tosanoumi**	K		(Japan)	**Musōyama**	10	-	5	-	0
12	-	3	-	0		(Japan)	**Takatōriki**	M1		(Japan)	Mitoizumi	3	-	12	-	0
5	-	10	-	0		(Japan)	Kotonowaka	M2		(Japan)	Kotoinazuma	2	-	13	-	0
6	-	9	-	0		(Japan)	Misugisato	M3		(Japan)	Minatofuji	4	-	11	-	0
9	-	6	-	0		(Japan)	**Akinoshima**	M4		(Japan)	Asahiyutaka	6	-	9	-	0
8	-	7	-	0		(Japan)	**Kenkō**	M5		(Japan)	Kotobeppu	4	-	11	-	0
6	-	9	-	0		(Japan)	Tochinowaka	M6		(Japan)	Kitakachidoki	5	-	10	-	0
6	-	9	-	0		(Japan)	Terao	M7		(Japan)	Asanosho	6	-	9	-	0
7	-	8	-	0		(United States)	Konishiki	M8		(Japan)	Daishōhō	7	-	8	-	0
9	-	6	-	0		(Japan)	**Naminohana**	M9		(Japan)	Hamanoshima	6	-	9	-	0
0	-	0	-	15	ø	(Japan)	Wakashoyo	M10		(Japan)	Kasugafuji	6	-	9	-	0
8	-	7	-	0		(Japan)	**Oginohana**	M11		(Japan)	**Aogiyama**	8	-	7	-	0
8	-	7	-	0		(Japan)	**Oginishiki**	M12		(Japan)	**Asanowaka**	8	-	7	-	0
7	-	8	-	0		(Japan)	Kirishima	M13		(Japan)	**Daishi**	8	-	7	-	0
9	-	6	-	0		(Japan)	**Higonoumi**	M14		(Japan)	Tomonohana	7	-	8	-	0
9	-	6	-	0		(Japan)	**Mainoumi**	M15		(Japan)	**Kyokudōzan**	9	-	6	-	0
10	-	5	-	0		(Japan)	**Tamakasuga**	M16	ø							

ø - Indicates a pull-out or absent rank
**winning record in bold**
**Yusho Winner**
***Won Playoff**

=== Haru basho ===
Osaka Prefectural Gymnasium, Osaka, 10 March – 24 March

1996 Haru basho results - Makuuchi Division
W		L		A	East		Rank	West			W		L		A
14	-	1	-	0	(Japan)	**Takanohana**	Y	ø	(United States)	Akebono	0	-	0	-	15
11	-	4	-	0	(Japan)	**Takanonami**	O		(United States)	**Musashimaru**	9	-	6	-	0
12	-	3	-	0	(Japan)	**Wakanohana**	O	ø							
9	-	6	-	0	(Japan)	**Kaiō**	S		(Japan)	**Kotonishiki**	8	-	7	-	0
12	-	3	-	0	(Japan)	**Musōyama**	S		(Japan)	**Takatōriki**	8	-	7	-	0
6	-	9	-	0	(Japan)	Tosanoumi	K		(Japan)	Akinoshima	6	-	9	-	0
5	-	10	-	0	(Japan)	Kenkō	M1		(Japan)	Naminohana	6	-	9	-	0
3	-	12	-	0	(Japan)	Oginohana	M2		(Japan)	Aogiyama	4	-	11	-	0
4	-	11	-	0	(Japan)	Higonoumi	M3		(Japan)	Oginishiki	2	-	13	-	0
8	-	7	-	0	(Japan)	**Misugisato**	M4		(Japan)	**Kotonowaka**	11	-	4	-	0
4	-	11	-	0	(Japan)	Asanowaka	M5		(Japan)	Tamakasuga	7	-	8	-	0
9	-	6	-	0	(Japan)	**Asahiyutaka**	M6		(Japan)	Mainoumi	6	-	9	-	0
5	-	10	-	0	(Japan)	Kyokudōzan	M7		(Japan)	Daishi	6	-	9	-	0
7	-	8	-	0	(Japan)	Mitoizumi	M8		(Japan)	Tochinowaka	6	-	9	-	0
9	-	6	-	0	(Japan)	**Minatofuji**	M9		(United States)	Konishiki	6	-	9	-	0
6	-	9	-	0	(Japan)	Wakashoyo	M10		(Japan)	**Daishōhō**	8	-	7	-	0
9	-	6	-	0	(Japan)	**Terao**	M11		(Japan)	**Asanosho**	8	-	7	-	0
9	-	6	-	0	(Japan)	**Kitakachidoki**	M12		(Japan)	**Kotobeppu**	8	-	7	-	0
9	-	6	-	0	(Japan)	**Kotoinazuma**	M13		(Japan)	**Hamanoshima**	8	-	7	-	0
8	-	7	-	0	(Japan)	**Kasugafuji**	M14		(Japan)	Kirishima	3	-	12	-	0
9	-	6	-	0	(Japan)	**Ganyū**	M15	ø							

ø - Indicates a pull-out or absent rank
**winning record in bold**
**Yusho Winner**

=== Natsu basho ===
Ryogoku Kokugikan, Tokyo, 12 May – 26 May

1996 Natsu basho results - Makuuchi Division
W		L		A	East		Rank	West			W		L		A
14	-	1	-	0	(Japan)	**Takanohana**	Y		(United States)	**Akebono**	10	-	5	-	0
12	-	3	-	0	(Japan)	**Wakanohana**	O		(Japan)	**Takanonami**	12	-	3	-	0
9	-	6	-	0	(United States)	**Musashimaru**	O	ø							
10	-	5	-	0	(Japan)	**Musōyama**	S		(Japan)	**Kaiō**	11	-	4	-	0
4	-	11	-	0	(Japan)	Kotonishiki	S		(Japan)	Takatōriki	7	-	8	-	0
5	-	10	-	0	(Japan)	Kotonowaka	K		(Japan)	**Asahiyutaka**	8	-	7	-	0
4	-	11	-	0	(Japan)	Misugisato	M1		(Japan)	Tosanoumi	5	-	10	-	0
5	-	10	-	0	(Japan)	Akinoshima	M2		(Japan)	Minatofuji	6	-	9	-	0
5	-	10	-	0	(Japan)	Terao	M3		(Japan)	Naminohana	7	-	8	-	0
4	-	11	-	0	(Japan)	Kitakachidoki	M4		(Japan)	**Daishōhō**	10	-	5	-	0
6	-	9	-	0	(Japan)	Asanosho	M5		(Japan)	Kenkō	6	-	9	-	0
9	-	6	-	0	(Japan)	**Tamakasuga**	M6		(Japan)	Kotoinazuma	7	-	8	-	0
6	-	9	-	0	(Japan)	Kotobeppu	M7		(Japan)	**Aogiyama**	8	-	7	-	0
6	-	9	-	0	(Japan)	Ganyū	M8		(Japan)	Hamanoshima	6	-	9	-	0
6	-	9	-	0	(Japan)	Higonoumi	M9		(Japan)	Mainoumi	7	-	8	-	0
9	-	6	-	0	(Japan)	**Mitoizumi**	M10		(Japan)	Kasugafuji	2	-	13	-	0
10	-	5	-	0	(Japan)	**Daishi**	M11		(Japan)	Oginohana	4	-	11	-	0
9	-	6	-	0	(Japan)	**Asanowaka**	M12		(Japan)	**Tochinowaka**	9	-	6	-	0
8	-	7	-	0	(Japan)	**Oginishiki**	M13		(Japan)	**Kyokudōzan**	9	-	6	-	0
10	-	5	-	0	(United States)	**Konishiki**	M14		(Japan)	Wakashoyo	4	-	11	-	0
10	-	5	-	0	(Japan)	**Shikishima**	M15	ø							

ø - Indicates a pull-out or absent rank
**winning record in bold**
**Yusho Winner**

=== Nagoya basho ===
Aichi Prefectural Gymnasium, Nagoya, 7 July – 21 July

1996 Natsu basho results - Makuuchi Division
W		L		A	East			Rank	West			W		L		A
13	-	2	-	0		(Japan)	**Takanohana**	Y		(United States)	**Akebono**	12	-	3	-	0
10	-	5	-	0		(Japan)	**Wakanohana**	O		(Japan)	**Takanonami**	12	-	3	-	0
10	-	5	-	0		(United States)	**Musashimaru**	O	ø							
10	-	5	-	0		(Japan)	**Kaiō**	S		(Japan)	Musōyama	7	-	8	-	0
7	-	8	-	0		(Japan)	Asahiyutaka	K		(Japan)	**Takatōriki**	10	-	5	-	0
					ø			K		(Japan)	Daishōhō	2	-	13	-	0
6	-	9	-	0		(Japan)	Tamakasuga	M1		(Japan)	Aogiyama	3	-	12	-	0
9	-	6	-	0		(Japan)	**Kotonowaka**	M2		(Japan)	**Kotonishiki**	9	-	6	-	0
4	-	11	-	0		(Japan)	Daishi	M3		(Japan)	Mitoizumi	4	-	11	-	0
3	-	12	-	0		(Japan)	Naminohana	M4		(Japan)	Minatofuji	5	-	10	-	0
6	-	9	-	0		(Japan)	Tosanoumi	M5		(Japan)	**Akinoshima**	10	-	5	-	0
4	-	11	-	0		(Japan)	Misugisato	M6		(Japan)	Terao	5	-	10	-	0
8	-	7	-	0		(Japan)	**Kotoinazuma**	M7		(Japan)	Asanosho	6	-	9	-	0
9	-	6	-	0		(Japan)	**Kenkō**	M8		(United States)	**Konishiki**	8	-	7	-	0
8	-	7	-	0		(Japan)	**Kitakachidoki**	M9		(Japan)	**Asanowaka**	8	-	7	-	0
9	-	6	-	0		(Japan)	**Kotobeppu**	M10		(Japan)	Tochinowaka	7	-	8	-	0
6	-	9	-	0		(Japan)	Shikishima	M11	ø	(Japan)	Mainoumi	2	-	1	-	12
8	-	7	-	0		(Japan)	**Kyokudōzan**	M12		(Japan)	**Oginishiki**	8	-	7	-	0
8	-	7	-	0		(Japan)	**Ganyū**	M13		(Japan)	**Hamanoshima**	8	-	7	-	0
9	-	6	-	0		(Japan)	**Higonoumi**	M14		(Japan)	**Rikiō**	9	-	6	-	0
8	-	7	-	0		(Japan)	**Kotoryū**	M15		(Japan)	Kushimaumi	6	-	9	-	0

ø - Indicates a pull-out or absent rank
**winning record in bold**
**Yusho Winner**

=== Aki basho ===
Ryogoku Kokugikan, Tokyo, 8 September – 22 September

1996 Aki basho results - Makuuchi Division
W		L		A	East			Rank	West			W		L		A
15	-	0	-	0		(Japan)	**Takanohana**	Y		(United States)	**Akebono**	10	-	5	-	0
9	-	6	-	0		(Japan)	**Takanonami**	O		(Japan)	**Wakanohana**	11	-	4	-	0
11	-	4	-	0		(United States)	**Musashimaru**	O	ø							
9	-	6	-	0		(Japan)	**Kaiō**	S		(Japan)	**Takatōriki**	11	-	4	-	0
7	-	8	-	0		(Japan)	Musōyama	K		(Japan)	Kotonowaka	4	-	11	-	0
					ø			K		(Japan)	**Kotonishiki**	10	-	5	-	0
9	-	6	-	0		(Japan)	**Asahiyutaka**	M1		(Japan)	Akinoshima	7	-	8	-	0
4	-	11	-	0		(Japan)	Kenkō	M2		(Japan)	Kotoinazuma	4	-	11	-	0
6	-	9	-	0		(Japan)	Tamakasuga	M3		(Japan)	Kotobeppu	3	-	12	-	0
4	-	11	-	0		(United States)	Konishiki	M4		(Japan)	Kitakachidoki	4	-	11	-	0
4	-	11	-	0		(Japan)	Asanowaka	M5		(Japan)	**Daishōhō**	8	-	7	-	0
6	-	9	-	0		(Japan)	Aogiyama	M6		(Japan)	**Tosanoumi**	8	-	7	-	0
6	-	9	-	0		(Japan)	Minatofuji	M7		(Japan)	Daishi	6	-	9	-	0
8	-	7	-	0		(Japan)	**Mitoizumi**	M8		(Japan)	Higonoumi	7	-	8	-	0
6	-	9	-	0		(Japan)	Kyokudōzan	M9		(Japan)	Rikiō	6	-	9	-	0
8	-	7	-	0		(Japan)	**Asanosho**	M10		(Japan)	**Terao**	9	-	6	-	0
9	-	6	-	0		(Japan)	**Oginishiki**	M11		(Japan)	Naminohana	7	-	8	-	0
8	-	7	-	0		(Japan)	**Ganyū**	M12		(Japan)	**Hamanoshima**	9	-	6	-	0
8	-	7	-	0		(Japan)	**Tochinowaka**	M13		(Japan)	**Kotoryū**	8	-	7	-	0
7	-	8	-	0		(Japan)	Misugisato	M14		(Japan)	**Shikishima**	8	-	7	-	0
9	-	6	-	0		(Mongolia)	**Kyokushūzan**	M15		(Japan)	**Daihishō**	8	-	7	-	0

ø - Indicates a pull-out or absent rank
**winning record in bold**
**Yusho Winner**

=== Kyushu basho ===
Fukuoka International Centre, Kyushu, 10 November – 24 November

1996 Aki basho results - Makuuchi Division
W		L		A	East			Rank	West			W		L		A
0	-	0	-	15	ø	(Japan)	Takanohana	Y		(United States)	**Akebono**	11	-	4	-	0
11	-	4	-	0		(Japan)	**Wakanohana**	O		(United States)	**Musashimaru***	11	-	4	-	0
11	-	4	-	0		(Japan)	**Takanonami**	O	ø							
6	-	9	-	0		(Japan)	Takatōriki	S		(Japan)	**Kaiō**	11	-	4	-	0
					ø			S		(Japan)	**Kotonishiki**	8	-	7	-	0
5	-	10	-	0		(Japan)	Asahiyutaka	K		(Japan)	**Musōyama**	8	-	7	-	0
1	-	14	-	0		(Japan)	Daishōhō	M1		(Japan)	**Tosanoumi**	8	-	7	-	0
9	-	6	-	0		(Japan)	**Akinoshima**	M2		(Japan)	Mitoizumi	4	-	11	-	0
4	-	11	-	0		(Japan)	Terao	M3		(Japan)	Kotonowaka	5	-	10	-	0
6	-	9	-	0		(Japan)	Oginishiki	M4		(Japan)	Asanosho	5	-	10	-	0
9	-	6	-	0		(Japan)	**Tamakasuga**	M5		(Japan)	Hamanoshima	5	-	10	-	0
8	-	7	-	0		(Japan)	**Kenkō**	M6		(Japan)	Kotoinazuma	5	-	10	-	0
6	-	9	-	0		(Japan)	Ganyū	M7		(Mongolia)	**Kyokushūzan**	8	-	7	-	0
8	-	7	-	0		(Japan)	**Tochinowaka**	M8		(Japan)	Kotoryū	7	-	8	-	0
6	-	9	-	0		(United States)	Konishiki	M9		(Japan)	**Kitakachidoki**	8	-	7	-	0
8	-	7	-	0		(Japan)	**Aogiyama**	M10		(Japan)	**Higonoumi**	9	-	6	-	0
9	-	6	-	0		(Japan)	**Asanowaka**	M11		(Japan)	Shikishima	7	-	8	-	0
7	-	8	-	0		(Japan)	Kotobeppu	M12		(Japan)	**Minatofuji**	9	-	6	-	0
9	-	6	-	0		(Japan)	**Daihishō**	M13		(Japan)	**Daishi**	9	-	6	-	0
5	-	10	-	0		(Japan)	Naminohana	M14	ø	(Japan)	Kyokudōzan	0	-	0	-	0
8	-	7	-	0		(Japan)	**Rikiō**	M15		(Japan)	**Tochiazuma**	10	-	5	-	0

ø - Indicates a pull-out or absent rank
**winning record in bold**
**Yusho Winner**
***Won 5-Way Playoff**

==== Playoff ====
(Lots are drawn. Four rikishi face in semifinals, and one is a reserve. The reserve and the two winners face in a 3-Way Playoff, where two consecutive victories are required to win the Playoff and the yūshō)

- Match 1: Musashimaru defeated Wakanohana
- Match 2: Takanonami defeated Kaiō
- Match 3: Musashimaru defeated Akebono
- Match 4: Musashimaru defeated Takanonami

== News ==
=== January ===
- Ozeki Takanonami wins his first top division yusho, defeating his yokozuna stablemate Takanohana in a playoff after both record 14–1 scores. Takatoriki is third on 11–4 and wins the Fighting Spirit Prize, shared with Kenko and newcomer Tamakasuga. Sekiwake Kaio gets the Outstanding Performance Award. Rikio wins the juryo championship after a playoff with Wakahayato. Saganobori, a former maegashira who has been fighting in the unsalaried ranks for three years, retires.

=== March ===
- Takanohana wins his 12th championship, finishing on 14–1, two wins ahead of his stablemate and brother Wakanohana and sekiwake Musoyama, who gets the Technique Award. Asahiyutaka is the only man to beat Takanohana and wins the Outstanding Performance Award. Kotonowaka wins eleven and the Fighting Spirit Award. Kyokushuzan wins the juryo yusho after a playoff with Saigo. Former ozeki Kirishima retires, as do former maegashira Owakamatsu and Tamakairiki (who has fallen to the jonidan division).

=== May ===
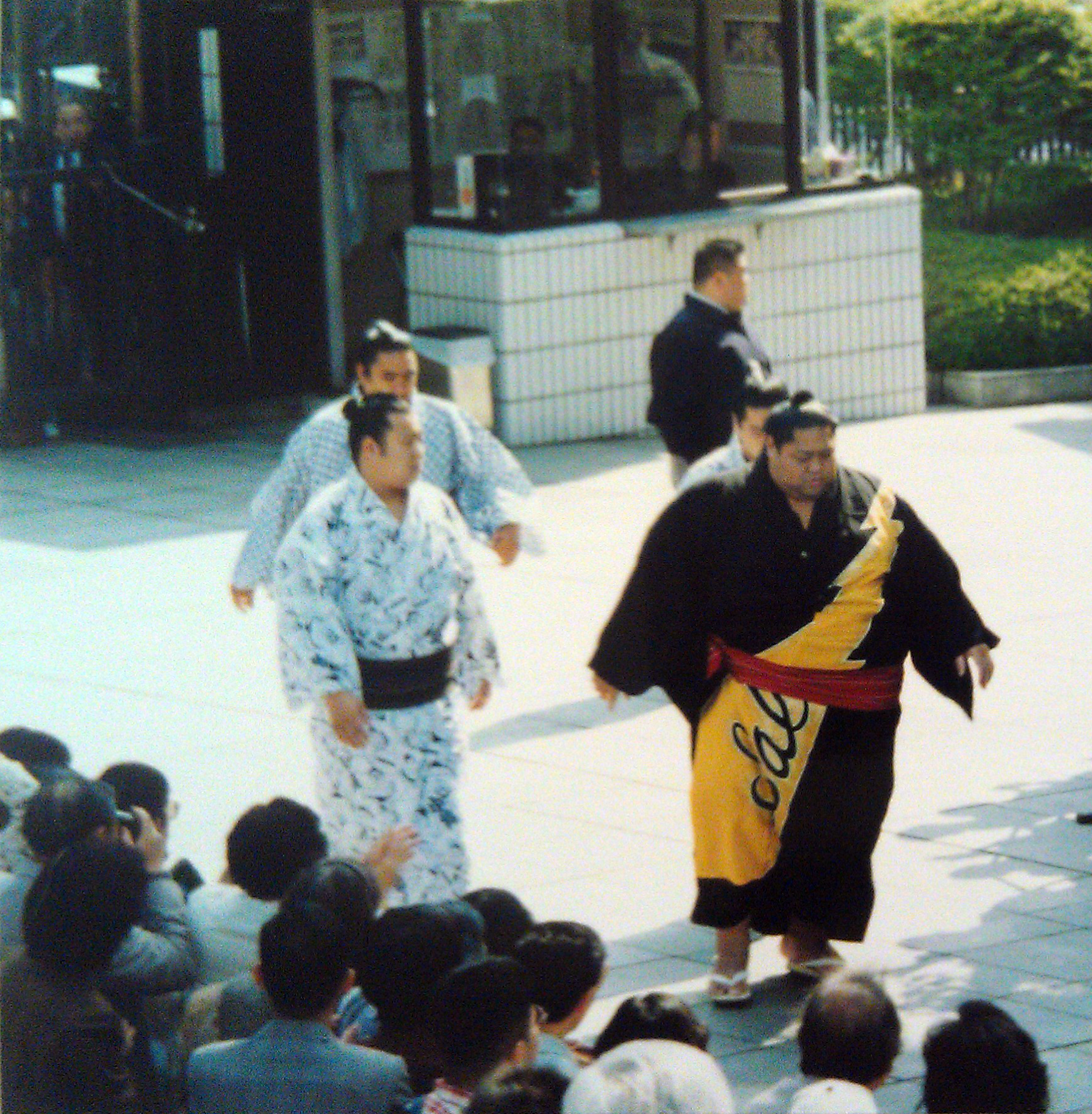
Konishiki at the Kokugikan in May 1996.

- Takanohana wins with a 14–1 record again, two wins ahead of Wakanohana and Takanonami, underlining the dominance of Futagoyama stable. Yokozuna Akebono returns from three tournaments sidelined by injury to score 10–5. Tamakasuga wins the Technique Prize and Kaio the Outstanding Performance Award. Veteran former ozeki Konishiki avoids demotion and certain retirement by winning ten bouts from maegashira 14. Rikio wins his second juryo championship. The makushita yusho is won by Dejima.

=== July ===
- At the Nagoya basho, Takanonami is eliminated from the yusho race on the final day when he is defeated by Kaio. The championship is decided in the final bout between Takanohana and Akebono, tied on 12–2. Takanohana wins to claim his 14th championship, while Akebono has his first runner-up performance since September 1995. Takatoriki wins his eighth Fighting Spirit Prize. Kaio and Kotonowaka share the Outstanding Performance Prize. The 95 kg Mainoumi is injured when the 275 kg Konishiki falls on his leg. He has to withdraw from the tournament, meaning he will fall to juryo. Daizen wins his second juryo championship. Former maegashira Kiraihō retires. Kyokushuzan becomes the first wrestler from Mongolia to earn promotion to the top division.

=== September ===
- Takanohana wins four consecutive championships for the first time. He finishes with an unbeaten 15–0 score (zensho-yusho), his fourth. Wakanohana, Takatoriki and Musashimaru all finish four wins behind on 11–4. Takatoriki shares the Fighting Spirit Prize with Asahiyutaka. Kotonishiki wins ten bouts from the komusubi rank and receives his sixth Technique Prize. Tochiazuma wins the juryo championship, his fifth yusho in five different divisions. Former maegashira Kasugafuji, Hitachiryu and Kyokugozan all retire.

=== November ===
- Takanohana misses the first tournament of his career after injuring his back on tour. In his absence Musashimaru wins his second championship in a five-way playoff after he, Wakanohana, Akebono, Takanonami, and Kaio all finish on 11–4. Kaio receives the Fighting Spirit Prize alongside newcomer Tochiazuma. Tosanoumi wins the Outstanding Performance Award. Tochinonada wins the juryo title in his debut. Former komusubi Kyokudozan retires to become a politician in the Diet of Japan.

== Deaths ==
- 4 Jan: Former maegashira Oedo, former Irumagawa Oyakata, aged 73.
- 14 Jan: Former komusubi Ohikari, former Onomatsu Oyakata, aged 68.
- 14 April: Former sekiwake Kotetsuyama, former Onaruto Oyakata, aged 53.
- 8 Dec: Kagamiyama Oyakata, the former yokozuna Kashiwado, aged 58.

== See also ==
- Glossary of sumo terms
- List of past sumo wrestlers
- List of years in sumo
- List of yokozuna
