= 1995 in sumo =

In 1995, yokozuna Takanohana finished first place, while fellow yokozuna Akebono ranked second. The third-ranked sumo wrestler was ōzeki Wakanohana, who took the championship title at the November Kyūshū Basho after winning in a playoff against his brother Takanohana, the first tournament bout between brothers in the history of sumo.

The followings are the events in professional sumo during 1995.

== Tournaments ==
=== Hatsu basho ===
Ryogoku Kokugikan, Tokyo, 8–22 January

1995 Hatsu basho results - Makuuchi Division
W		L		A	East		Rank	West			W		L		A
13	-	2	-	0	(Japan)	**Takanohana***	Y		(United States)	**Akebono**	12	-	3	-	0
11	-	4	-	0	(Japan)	**Takanonami**	O		(United States)	**Musashimaru**	13	-	2	-	0
12	-	3	-	0	(Japan)	**Wakanohana**	O	ø							
8	-	7	-	0	(Japan)	**Kaiō**	S	ø	(Japan)	Kotonishiki	4	-	5	-	6
11	-	4	-	0	(Japan)	**Akinoshima**	K	ø	(Japan)	Musōyama	4	-	3	-	8
5	-	10	-	0	(Japan)	Kotonowaka	M1		(Japan)	Takatōriki	7	-	8	-	0
4	-	11	-	0	(Japan)	Tochinowaka	M2		(Japan)	Terao	5	-	10	-	0
4	-	11	-	0	(Japan)	Hamanoshima	M3		(Japan)	Mainoumi	4	-	11	-	0
5	-	10	-	0	(Japan)	Kenkō	M4		(Japan)	Kushimaumi	3	-	12	-	0
5	-	10	-	0	(Japan)	Kotoinazuma	M5		(Japan)	Tomonohana	6	-	9	-	0
2	-	13	-	0	(Japan)	Daizen	M6		(Japan)	Kirishima	4	-	11	-	0
9	-	6	-	0	(Japan)	**Naminohana**	M7		(Japan)	Kitakachidoki	7	-	8	-	0
8	-	7	-	0	(Japan)	**Misugisato**	M8		(United States)	**Konishiki**	8	-	7	-	0
7	-	8	-	0	(Japan)	Kasugafuji	M9		(Japan)	**Kotobeppu**	9	-	6	-	0
8	-	7	-	0	(Japan)	**Daishi**	M10		(Japan)	**Asanowaka**	9	-	6	-	0
7	-	8	-	0	(Japan)	Kiraihō	M11		(Japan)	**Daishōhō**	11	-	4	-	0
8	-	7	-	0	(Japan)	**Kyokudōzan**	M12		(Japan)	**Oginishiki**	9	-	6	-	0
7	-	8	-	0	(Japan)	Mitoizumi	M13		(Japan)	**Higonoumi**	8	-	7	-	0
8	-	7	-	0	(Japan)	**Minatofuji**	M14		(Japan)	Tokitsunada	7	-	8	-	0
8	-	7	-	0	(Japan)	**Wakashoyo**	M15		(Japan)	**Takamisugi**	8	-	7	-	0
5	-	10	-	0	(Japan)	Kotogaume	M16	ø							

ø - Indicates a pull-out or absent rank
**winning record in bold**
**Yusho Winner**
***Won Playoff**

=== Haru basho ===
Osaka Prefectural Gymnasium, Osaka, 12–26 March

1995 Haru basho results - Makuuchi Division
W		L		A	East		Rank	West			W		L		A
13	-	2	-	0	(Japan)	**Takanohana**	Y		(United States)	**Akebono**	14	-	1	-	0
12	-	3	-	0	(United States)	**Musashimaru**	O		(Japan)	**Wakanohana**	12	-	3	-	0
9	-	6	-	0	(Japan)	**Takanonami**	O	ø							
8	-	7	-	0	(Japan)	**Kaiō**	S		(Japan)	**Akinoshima**	11	-	4	-	0
6	-	9	-	0	(Japan)	Naminohana	K		(Japan)	Daishōhō	5	-	10	-	0
3	-	12	-	0	(Japan)	Kotobeppu	M1		(Japan)	Misugisato	5	-	10	-	0
8	-	7	-	0	(Japan)	**Takatōriki**	M2		(Japan)	Asanowaka	6	-	9	-	0
5	-	10	-	0	(United States)	Konishiki	M3	ø	(Japan)	Kotonishiki	0	-	0	-	15
7	-	8	-	0	(Japan)	Kotonowaka	M4	ø	(Japan)	Musōyama	0	-	0	-	15
3	-	12	-	0	(Japan)	Daishi	M5		(Japan)	Oginishiki	3	-	12	-	0
8	-	7	-	0	(Japan)	**Terao**	M6		(Japan)	Tochinowaka	6	-	9	-	0
5	-	10	-	0	(Japan)	Tomonohana	M7		(Japan)	**Kenkō**	10	-	5	-	0
6	-	9	-	0	(Japan)	Hamanoshima	M8		(Japan)	Kyokudōzan	6	-	9	-	0
6	-	9	-	0	(Japan)	Mainoumi	M9		(Japan)	Kotoinazuma	6	-	9	-	0
7	-	8	-	0	(Japan)	Kitakachidoki	M10		(Japan)	**Higonoumi**	10	-	5	-	0
8	-	7	-	0	(Japan)	**Minatofuji**	M11		(Japan)	Kasugafuji	7	-	8	-	0
4	-	11	-	0	(Japan)	Kushimaumi	M12		(Japan)	**Wakashoyo**	9	-	6	-	0
8	-	7	-	0	(Japan)	**Kirishima**	M13		(Japan)	**Kiraihō**	8	-	7	-	0
10	-	5	-	0	(Japan)	**Takamisugi**	M14		(Japan)	Daizen	6	-	9	-	0
8	-	7	-	0	(Japan)	**Asahiyutaka**	M15		(Japan)	**Mitoizumi**	9	-	6	-	0
8	-	7	-	0	(Japan)	**Asanosho**	M16	ø							

ø - Indicates a pull-out or absent rank
**winning record in bold**
**Yusho Winner**

=== Natsu basho ===
Ryogoku Kokugikan, Tokyo, 7–21 May

1995 Natsu basho results - Makuuchi Division
W		L		A	East		Rank	West			W		L		A
13	-	2	-	0	(United States)	**Akebono**	Y		(Japan)	**Takanohana**	14	-	1	-	0
12	-	3	-	0	(United States)	**Musashimaru**	O		(Japan)	**Wakanohana**	9	-	6	-	0
6	-	9	-	0	(Japan)	Takanonami	O	ø							
7	-	8	-	0	(Japan)	Akinoshima	S		(Japan)	**Kaiō**	9	-	6	-	0
5	-	10	-	0	(Japan)	Takatōriki	K		(Japan)	Kenkō	5	-	10	-	0
5	-	10	-	0	(Japan)	Terao	M1	ø	(Japan)	Higonoumi	6	-	7	-	2
6	-	9	-	0	(Japan)	Naminohana	M2		(Japan)	Takamisugi	4	-	11	-	0
5	-	10	-	0	(Japan)	Daishōhō	M3		(Japan)	**Kotonishiki**	8	-	7	-	0
3	-	12	-	0	(Japan)	Wakashoyo	M4		(Japan)	**Musōyama**	11	-	4	-	0
9	-	6	-	0	(Japan)	**Kotonowaka**	M5		(Japan)	Asanowaka	5	-	10	-	0
8	-	7	-	0	(Japan)	**Misugisato**	M6		(Japan)	Minatofuji	6	-	9	-	0
5	-	10	-	0	(Japan)	Mitoizumi	M7		(United States)	Konishiki	5	-	10	-	0
6	-	9	-	0	(Japan)	Kirishima	M8		(Japan)	**Tochinowaka**	8	-	7	-	0
7	-	8	-	0	(Japan)	Kiraihō	M9		(Japan)	**Kotobeppu**	8	-	7	-	0
6	-	9	-	0	(Japan)	Asahiyutaka	M10		(Japan)	Hamanoshima	7	-	8	-	0
8	-	7	-	0	(Japan)	**Asanosho**	M11		(Japan)	**Kyokudōzan**	8	-	7	-	0
9	-	6	-	0	(Japan)	**Kitakachidoki**	M12		(Japan)	**Mainoumi**	9	-	6	-	0
9	-	6	-	0	(Japan)	**Tokitsunada**	M13		(Japan)	Tomonohana	7	-	8	-	0
9	-	6	-	0	(Japan)	**Kotoinazuma**	M14		(Japan)	**Kasugafuji**	8	-	7	-	0
8	-	7	-	0	(Japan)	**Daishi**	M15		(Japan)	**Oginishiki**	8	-	7	-	0
7	-	8	-	0	(Japan)	Shikishima	M16	ø							

ø - Indicates a pull-out or absent rank
**winning record in bold**
**Yusho Winner**

=== Nagoya basho ===
Aichi Prefectural Gymnasium, Nagoya, 2–16 July

1995 Nagoya basho results - Makuuchi Division
W		L		A	East			Rank	West			W		L		A
13	-	2	-	0		(Japan)	**Takanohana**	Y		(United States)	**Akebono**	11	-	4	-	0
12	-	3	-	0		(United States)	**Musashimaru**	O		(Japan)	**Wakanohana**	11	-	4	-	0
9	-	6	-	0		(Japan)	**Takanonami**	O	ø							
9	-	6	-	0		(Japan)	**Kaiō**	S		(Japan)	**Musōyama**	10	-	5	-	0
1	-	2	-	12	ø	(Japan)	Akinoshima	K		(Japan)	**Kotonowaka**	9	-	6	-	0
8	-	7	-	0		(Japan)	**Kotonishiki**	M1		(Japan)	Misugisato	5	-	10	-	0
3	-	12	-	0		(Japan)	Tochinowaka	M2		(Japan)	Kotobeppu	4	-	11	-	0
0	-	0	-	15	ø	(Japan)	Higonoumi	M3		(Japan)	**Takatōriki**	9	-	6	-	0
11	-	4	-	0		(Japan)	**Kenkō**	M4		(Japan)	Naminohana	4	-	11	-	0
4	-	11	-	0		(Japan)	Kitakachidoki	M5		(Japan)	Terao	5	-	10	-	0
5	-	10	-	0		(Japan)	Mainoumi	M6		(Japan)	Tokitsunada	3	-	12	-	0
6	-	9	-	0		(Japan)	Daishōhō	M7		(Japan)	Tosanoumi	7	-	8	-	0
5	-	10	-	0		(Japan)	Asanosho	M8		(Japan)	Kyokudōzan	5	-	10	-	0
6	-	9	-	0		(Japan)	Takamisugi	M9		(Japan)	**Kotoinazuma**	8	-	7	-	0
8	-	7	-	0		(Japan)	**Minatofuji**	M10		(Japan)	**Asanowaka**	8	-	7	-	0
6	-	0	-	0		(Japan)	Kiraihō	M11		(Japan)	Kasugafuji	7	-	8	-	0
8	-	7	-	0		(Japan)	**Kirishima**	M12		(Japan)	**Hamanoshima**	9	-	6	-	0
8	-	7	-	0		(Japan)	**Mitoizumi**	M13		(United States)	**Konishiki**	9	-	6	-	0
8	-	7	-	0		(Japan)	**Daishi**	M14		(Japan)	**Oginishiki**	9	-	6	-	0
11	-	4	-	0		(Japan)	**Wakashoyo**	M15		(Japan)	**Asahiyutaka**	9	-	6	-	0
0	-	0	-	15	ø	(Japan)	Tomonohana	M16	ø							

ø - Indicates a pull-out or absent rank
**winning record in bold**
**Yusho Winner**

=== Aki basho ===
Ryogoku Kokugikan, Tokyo, 10–24 September

1995 Aki basho results - Makuuchi Division
W		L		A	East			Rank	West			W		L		A
15	-	0	-	0		(Japan)	**Takanohana**	Y		(United States)	**Akebono**	12	-	3	-	0
10	-	5	-	0		(United States)	**Musashimaru**	O		(Japan)	**Wakanohana**	10	-	5	-	0
8	-	7	-	0		(Japan)	**Takanonami**	O	ø							
8	-	7	-	0		(Japan)	**Musōyama**	S		(Japan)	**Kaiō**	11	-	4	-	0
4	-	11	-	0		(Japan)	Kotonowaka	K		(Japan)	Kenkō	6	-	9	-	0
					ø			K		(Japan)	**Kotonishiki**	10	-	5	-	0
8	-	7	-	0		(Japan)	**Takatōriki**	M1		(Japan)	**Kotoinazuma**	9	-	6	-	0
5	-	10	-	0		(Japan)	Minatofuji	M2		(Japan)	Hamanoshima	3	-	12	-	0
4	-	11	-	0		(Japan)	Higonoumi	M3		(Japan)	Asanowaka	4	-	11	-	0
7	-	8	-	0		(Japan)	Wakashoyo	M4		(Japan)	Misugisato	6	-	9	-	0
5	-	10	-	0		(United States)	Konishiki	M5		(Japan)	Kirishima	4	-	11	-	0
5	-	10	-	0		(Japan)	Oginishiki	M6		(Japan)	Kotobeppu	6	-	9	-	0
7	-	8	-	0		(Japan)	Asahiyutaka	M7	ø	(Japan)	Akinoshima	0	-	0	-	15
11	-	4	-	0		(Japan)	**Tosanoumi**	M8		(Japan)	**Tochinowaka**	8	-	7	-	0
8	-	7	-	0		(Japan)	**Mitoizumi**	M9		(Japan)	**Terao**	8	-	7	-	0
8	-	7	-	0		(Japan)	**Daishi**	M10		(Japan)	Daishōhō	6	-	9	-	0
8	-	7	-	0		(Japan)	**Naminohana**	M11		(Japan)	**Mainoumi**	8	-	7	-	0
8	-	7	-	0		(Japan)	**Kitakachidoki**	M12		(Japan)	Takamisugi	2	-	13	-	0
8	-	7	-	0		(Japan)	**Asanosho**	M13		(Japan)	**Kasugafuji**	8	-	7	-	0
9	-	6	-	0		(Japan)	**Kyokudōzan**	M14		(Japan)	**Kiraihō**	8	-	7	-	0
6	-	9	-	0		(Japan)	Tokitsunada	M15		(Japan)	**Tomonohana**	9	-	6	-	0

ø - Indicates a pull-out or absent rank
**winning record in bold**
**Yusho Winner**

=== Kyushu basho ===
Fukuoka International Centre, Kyushu, 9–23 November

1995 Kyushu basho results - Makuuchi Division
W		L		A	East			Rank	West			W		L		A
12	-	3	-	0		(Japan)	**Takanohana**	Y	ø	(United States)	Akebono	7	-	3	-	5
10	-	5	-	0		(United States)	**Musashimaru**	O		(Japan)	**Wakanohana***	12	-	3	-	0
9	-	6	-	0		(Japan)	**Takanonami**	O	ø							
9	-	6	-	0		(Japan)	**Kaiō**	S		(Japan)	Musōyama	7	-	8	-	0
					ø	(Japan)		S		(Japan)	**Kotonishiki**	8	-	7	-	0
6	-	9	-	0		(Japan)	Kotoinazuma	K		(Japan)	Takatōriki	7	-	8	-	0
5	-	10	-	0		(Japan)	Kenkō	M1		(Japan)	**Tosanoumi**	9	-	6	-	0
5	-	10	-	0		(Japan)	Tochinowaka	M2		(Japan)	**Mitoizumi**	8	-	7	-	0
5	-	10	-	0		(Japan)	Terao	M3		(Japan)	**Kotonowaka**	8	-	7	-	0
3	-	12	-	0		(Japan)	Daishi	M4	ø	(Japan)	Wakashoyo	5	-	9	-	1
6	-	9	-	0		(Japan)	Naminohana	M5		(Japan)	**Minatofuji**	8	-	7	-	0
9	-	6	-	0		(Japan)	**Misugisato**	M6		(Japan)	Mainoumi	4	-	11	-	0
4	-	11	-	0		(Japan)	Kyokudōzan	M7		(Japan)	**Akinoshima**	8	-	7	-	0
8	-	7	-	0		(Japan)	**Asahiyutaka**	M8		(Japan)	Higonoumi	6	-	9	-	0
8	-	7	-	0		(Japan)	**Kotobeppu**	M9		(Japan)	Asanowaka	7	-	8	-	0
8	-	7	-	0		(Japan)	**Kitakachidoki**	M10		(United States)	**Konishiki**	8	-	7	-	0
7	-	8	-	0		(Japan)	Tomonohana	M11		(Japan)	**Hamanoshima**	8	-	7	-	0
9	-	6	-	0		(Japan)	**Asanosho**	M12		(Japan)	**Kasugafuji**	8	-	7	-	0
8	-	7	-	0		(Japan)	**Oginishiki**	M13		(Japan)	Kiraihō	3	-	12	-	0
8	-	7	-	0		(Japan)	**Kirishima**	M14		(Japan)	**Daishōhō**	10	-	5	-	0
9	-	6	-	0		(Japan)	**Oginohana**	M15		(Japan)	**Aogiyama**	9	-	6	-	0

ø - Indicates a pull-out or absent rank
**winning record in bold**
**Yusho Winner**
***Won Playoff**

== News ==
=== January ===
- In his debut tournament as a yokozuna, Takanohana wins his eighth makuuchi division championship in a playoff with ozeki Musashimaru after both finish on 13–2. Kaio wins the Outstanding Performance prize in his sekiwake debut. The Fighting Spirit prize is shared between Akinoshima and Daishoho. Asahiyutaka wins the juryo title after a playoff with Tosanoumi, and Kyokushuzan wins the makushita championship.

=== March ===
- Takanohana's yokozuna rival Akebono responds by winning his eighth championship, defeating him on the final day to finish on 14–1. Veteran Terao wins the Outstanding Performance prize. Akinoshima scores 11–4 in his second successive tournament and wins his second Fighting Spirit Award in a row. Former maegashira Kototsubaki retires. Tokitsunada wins the juryo championship with a 10–5 record after a playoff with Shikishima.

=== May ===
- Once again Akebono and Takanohana meet in a yusho deciding match. This time Takanohana wins to finish on 14–1. Musashimaru is third on 12–3, and Musoyama wins Outstanding Performance and Fighting Spirit prizes after a fine 11–4 record. Tosanoumi wins the juryo championship.

=== July ===
- Takanohana wins his tenth championship with a 13–2 record, one ahead of Musashimaru. It is the fifth tournament in a row that Musashimaru has won twelve bouts or better. Kenko scores 11–4 and wins the Outstanding Performance prize, shared with Kotonishiki. Musoyama wins the Technique Prize; it is the first time in a year that this prize has been awarded. Kotonowaka gets the Fighting Spirit Award. Tosanoumi makes his top division debut halfway up the maegashira ranks at #7, and fights an ozeki and a yokozuna in his first two bouts. He finishes on 7–8. The juryo championship is won by Kyokushuzan. Chiyotaikai comes through with a winning record in his juryo debut. The Hawaiian wrestler Daiki (Percy Kipapa) wins the makushita championship with a perfect 7–0 record, ensuring his promotion to the sekitori ranks. The sandanme championship is won by Shiga (the future ozeki Tochiazuma). It is his third consecutive yusho and he is unbeaten in 25 bouts since his professional debut.

=== September ===
- Takanohana wins his fourth yusho of the year, with a perfect 15–0 score. Akebono is runner-up, three wins behind. Kotonishiki wins the Technique prize, and Kaio the Outstanding Performance Award. Kotoinazuma scores 9–6 and wins the Fighting Spirit prize, earning promotion to the sanyaku ranks for the first time at the age of 33. His award is shared with Tosanoumi. Wakanojo wins the juryo title in his debut with a 12–3 record, three wins ahead of anyone else. Shiga's winning streak is stopped at 26, and he finishes with a 3–4 losing score in his debut in the makushita division. Former sekiwake Kotofuji, surprise winner of the July 1991 tournament, announces his retirement.

=== November ===
- Ozeki Wakanohana wins his second career championship, defeating his brother Takanohana in a historic playoff after both men finish on 12–3. It is the first time the brothers have met in competition. Akebono pulls out midway through due to injury. Tosanoumi wins two special prizes for Technique and Outstanding Performance. Minatofuji wins the Fighting Spirit prize, shared with Kaio. Former maegashira Wakanoyama wins the juryo championship with an 11–4 score after a playoff with Daihisho. One win behind on 10–5 are Tamakasuga, who is promoted to makuuchi, and Hawaiian wrestler Sunahama (William Taylor Hopkins), in his juryo debut. Four former top division wrestlers announce their retirements: Takamisugi, Daishoyama, Kirinishiki and Komafudō.

== Deaths ==
- 26 January: Former sekiwake Kurama, also former Shikoroyama Oyakata, aged 42.
- 31 March: Former maegashira Wakanoumi, also former Otake Oyakata aged 50.
- 4 June: Former maegashira Hideminato, aged 69.
- 20 July: Former maegashira Fukunoumi, also former Kitajin, Urakaze, Kiriyama, Hakkaku and Nakagawa Oyakata, aged 65.
- 16 Sept: Former maegashira Fukunosato, aged 71.
- 3 Oct: Former komusubi Kuninobori, also former Sanoyama Oyakata, aged 70.

== See also ==
- Glossary of sumo terms
- List of past sumo wrestlers
- List of years in sumo
- List of yokozuna
