= Takanonami Sadahiro =

Japanese sumo wrestler

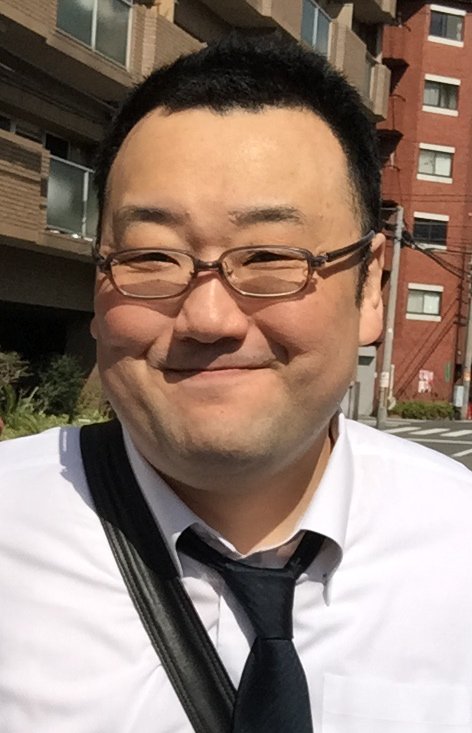

Personal information
- Native name: 貴ノ浪 貞博
- Born: Sadahiro Namioka; October 27, 1971 Aomori, Japan
- Died: June 20, 2015 (aged 43)
- Height: 1.96 m (6 ft 5 in)
- Weight: 160 kg (353 lb)

Sport
- Sport: Sumo
- Retired: May, 2004
- Heya: Futagoyama
- Record: 777–559–13
- Debut: March, 1987
- Highest rank: Ōzeki (March 1994)
- Elder name: Otowayama
- Championships: 2 (Makuuchi)
- Special Prizes: Fighting Spirit (3)
- Gold Stars: 2 (Musashimaru)
- Updated on June 25, 2020

Takanonami Sadahiro (born Sadahiro Namioka October 27, 1971 – June 20, 2015) was a Japanese sumo wrestler and coach from Aomori. He held sumo's second highest rank of ōzeki from 1994 until 2000. He won two tournament championships, and was a runner-up in eight others. He was a sumo coach from his retirement in 2004 until his death in 2015 at the age of 43.

== Career ==
Born in Misawa, Aomori, the young Namioka did sumo at elementary school, but did not initially consider it as a profession, intending to follow his father and work in local government. However, he was introduced to Fujishima Oyakata (the former Takanohana Kenshi) who was in Misawa to give a speech, and was persuaded to join Fujishima Stable.

Takanonami made his professional debut in 1987. He became an elite sekitori ranked wrestler in March 1991 when he was promoted to the second highest jūryō division, and he reached the top makuuchi division in November 1991. He led the race for the championship in the first week of the tournament, the first debutant to do so, and defeated Kotonishiki, the winner of the previous tournament. However he started losing in the second week and finished with a score of 8–7. He earned his first special prize in his first tournament at komusubi rank in May 1993. After a 13–2 runner-up performance from sekiwake rank in January 1994, he earned promotion to ōzeki simultaneously with Musashimaru. His two tournament victories in January 1996 and November 1997 both came after playoff wins against stablemate Takanohana. He normally avoided having to meet Takanohana, as well as other top division stars such as Wakanohana, Takatōriki and Akinoshima, as they were all members of Futagoyama stable, a large and dominant heya which had merged with Fujishima in 1993. At his peak he consistently scored 11 or 12 wins in a tournament and was runner-up three times in 1996. He was ranked as an ōzeki for 37 tournaments in total. He lost the rank at the end of 1999 after two make-koshi or losing scores, but was promoted back after scoring ten wins as a sekiwake in January 2000: the first wrestler to achieve this since Mienoumi in 1976. However, after two more losing scores in March and May 2000 he was demoted once again, and was never able to return.

== Rivalry with Musashimaru ==
Takanonami had a well-known rivalry with fellow ōzeki and later yokozuna, Musashimaru. They met a total of 58 times in the top division, which at the time of his retirement was the most between any two wrestlers in the history of sumo. In all, Musashimaru had the upper hand, winning 37 bouts to Takanonami's 21, although Takanonami did manage to beat him seven times in a row from November 1996 to January 1998, and also won their last three matches, after he had fallen from the ōzeki rank. Two of those wins provided Takanonami with his only kinboshi.

== Fighting style ==
Takanonami had an unusual defensive style, often being driven back to the edge of the dohyō before using his long reach to lean over and grab his opponent's arms and launch a counter-offensive. This style was given as the reason why he was not awarded a special prize in November 1993 despite a 12–3 record at sekiwake rank. He regularly won by kimedashi (arm barring force out), a sumo technique seldom seen today. He was also a frequent employer of kotenage, the armbar throw, with 65 victories using this technique from 1990, more than any of his contemporaries. In his later years his various injuries (particularly those to his ankles) meant his defensive style was less effective, and his results suffered. He largely remained in the maegashira ranks and had six consecutive losing scores in 2003.

== Retirement ==
By May 2004 Takanonami was the only top division wrestler left from the once dominant Futagoyama stable, which had been renamed Takanohana stable a few months earlier. He had slipped to maegashira 13 in the rankings and after losing his first two bouts, he announced his retirement. He worked as a coach in his old stable under the name Otowayama. Along with five other oyakata (Magaki, Onomatsu, Ōtake, Tokiwayama and Futagoyama), he left the Nishonoseki ichimon or group of stables in January 2010 after declaring his support for his former stablemate Takanohana's unsanctioned bid to be elected to the board of directors of the Sumo Association. He was appointed as a judge of tournament bouts in February 2015. As an oyakata he was known as one of the more bright personalities in his stable, and he appeared on a number of variety programs on Japanese TV largely due to his accessible personality.

Takanonami was reportedly a big fan of American football and appeared as a commentator on sports programs in Japan.

== Health problems and death ==
Takanonami was first diagnosed as having a possible heart condition, specifically atrial fibrillation, in 1998. He spent some time in hospital whilst still an active wrestler, but in February 2006 he was admitted to hospital once again with sepsis, pneumonia and other complications. He fell into cardiac arrest and had to undergo emergency surgery, which saved his life. On June 20, 2015, he died of acute heart failure.

== Career record ==
Takanonami Sadahiro
Year	January Hatsu basho, Tokyo	March Haru basho, Osaka	May Natsu basho, Tokyo	July Nagoya basho, Nagoya	September Aki basho, Tokyo	November Kyūshū basho, Fukuoka
1987	x	(Maezumo)	East Jonokuchi #4; 6–1	West Jonidan #87; 4–3	East Jonidan #58; 4–3	West Jonidan #29; 3–4
1988	West Jonidan #41; 6–1	West Sandanme #81; 4–3	West Sandanme #61; 3–4	East Sandanme #76; 5–2	West Sandanme #41; 4–3	West Sandanme #23; 4–3
1989	West Sandanme #10; 4–3	West Makushita #58; 4–3	West Makushita #43; 4–3	East Makushita #33; 4–3	East Makushita #24; 4–3	West Makushita #16; 1–1–5
1990	East Makushita #40; 5–2	East Makushita #24; 5–2	West Makushita #11; 4–3	West Makushita #8; 2–5	West Makushita #22; 5–2	East Makushita #9; 4–3
1991	East Makushita #4; 5–2	East Jūryō #13; 9–6	East Jūryō #7; 8–7	West Jūryō #4; 7–8	East Jūryō #6; 12–3–P	East Maegashira #13; 8–7
1992	East Maegashira #11; 10–5	East Maegashira #4; 5–10	East Maegashira #10; 7–8	West Maegashira #12; 9–6	West Maegashira #5; 6–9	East Maegashira #10; 9–6
1993	East Maegashira #7; 10–5	East Maegashira #1; 9–6	East Komusubi #1; 10–5; F	East Sekiwake #2; 9–6	West Sekiwake #1; 10–5	East Sekiwake #1; 12–3
1994	West Sekiwake #1; 13–2; F	East Ōzeki #2; 12–3–PP	East Ōzeki #1; 9–6	East Ōzeki #2; 12–3	East Ōzeki #2; 12–3	East Ōzeki #2; 12–3
1995	East Ōzeki #1; 11–4	East Ōzeki #2; 9–6	East Ōzeki #2; 6–9	East Ōzeki #2; 9–6	East Ōzeki #2; 8–7	East Ōzeki #2; 9–6
1996	East Ōzeki #2; 14–1–P	East Ōzeki #1; 11–4	West Ōzeki #1; 12–3	West Ōzeki #1; 12–3	East Ōzeki #1; 9–6	East Ōzeki #2; 11–4–PP
1997	East Ōzeki #2; 6–9	East Ōzeki #2; 11–4	West Ōzeki #1; 10–5	East Ōzeki #2; 9–6	West Ōzeki #1; 12–3	West Ōzeki #1; 14–1–P
1998	East Ōzeki #1; 10–5	West Ōzeki #1; 8–7	East Ōzeki #2; 11–4	East Ōzeki #1; 9–6	West Ōzeki #1; 10–5	West Ōzeki #1; 8–7
1999	West Ōzeki #1; 6–9	West Ōzeki #2; 12–3	West Ōzeki #1; 9–6	East Ōzeki #1; 8–7	East Ōzeki #1; 3–4–8	East Ōzeki #2; 6–9
2000	West Sekiwake #2; 10–5	East Ōzeki #2; 7–8	West Ōzeki #2; 6–9	West Sekiwake #2; 7–8	West Komusubi #1; 9–6	East Sekiwake #1; 6–9
2001	East Maegashira #1; 6–9	East Maegashira #3; 6–9	West Maegashira #5; 8–7	West Maegashira #1; 5–10	East Maegashira #5; 5–10	East Maegashira #10; 9–6
2002	West Maegashira #3; 8–7	West Komusubi #1; 6–9	East Maegashira #2; 4–11	West Maegashira #7; 9–6	West Komusubi #1; 7–8	East Maegashira #1; 10–5; F★
2003	East Komusubi #1; 7–8	East Maegashira #1; 7–8	West Maegashira #2; 7–8	East Maegashira #3; 6–9 ★	West Maegashira #4; 7–8	East Maegashira #5; 5–10
2004	East Maegashira #10; 8–7	West Maegashira #8; 5–10	East Maegashira #13; Retired; 0–3	x	x	x
Record given as wins–losses–absences Top division champion Top division runner-up Retired Lower divisions Non-participation Sanshō key: F=Fighting spirit; O=Outstanding performance; T=Technique Also shown: ★=Kinboshi; P=Playoff(s); Divisions: Makuuchi — Jūryō — Makushita — Sandanme — Jonidan — Jonokuchi Makuuchi ranks: Yokozuna — Ōzeki — Sekiwake — Komusubi — Maegashira

== See also ==
- List of sumo tournament top division champions
- List of sumo tournament top division runners-up
- Glossary of sumo terms
- List of past sumo wrestlers
- List of ōzeki
