= Tochisakae Atsushi =

Japanese sumo wrestler

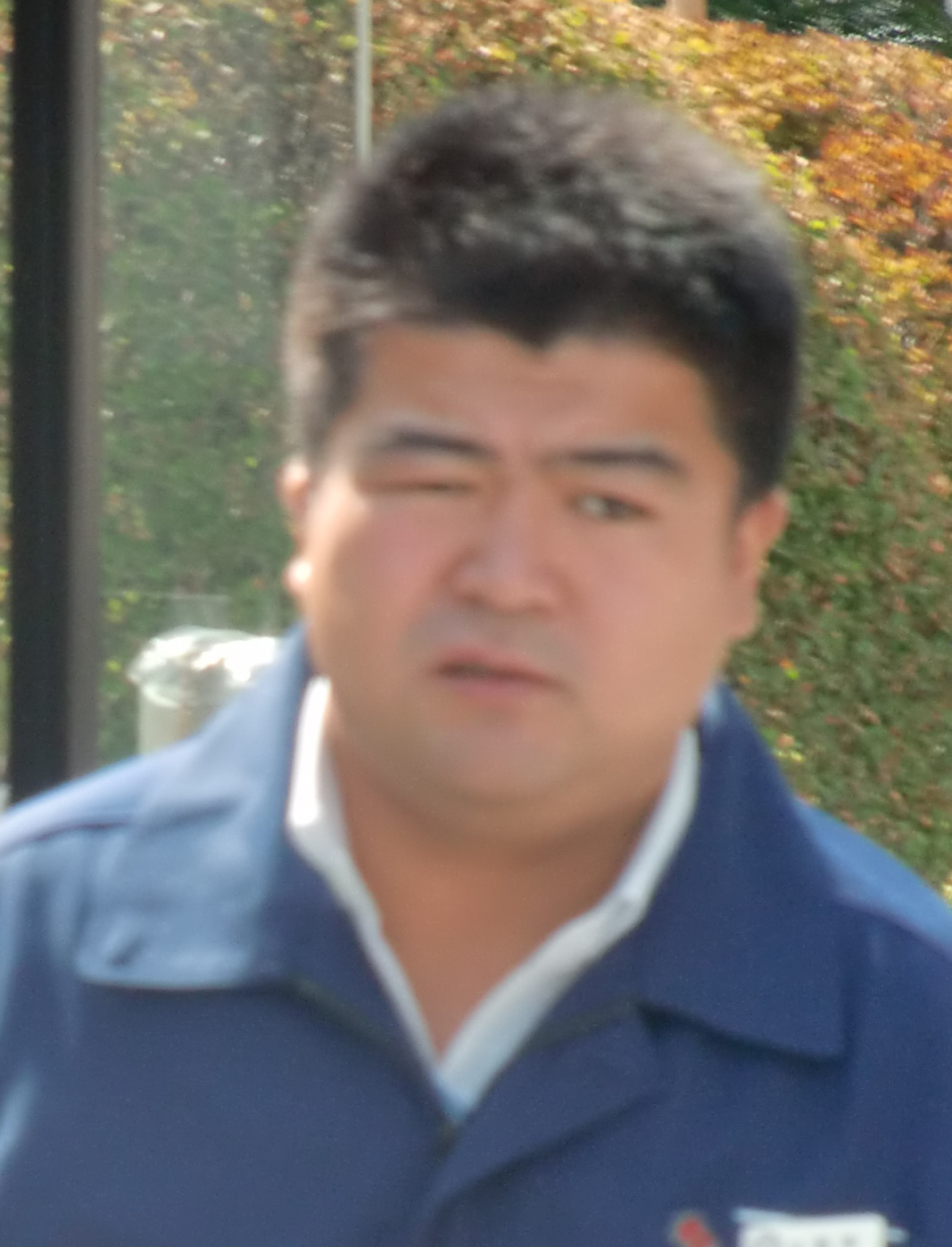

Personal information
- Native name: 栃栄 篤史
- Born: Atsushi Okamoto; June 27, 1974 (age 52) Saga, Japan
- Height: 1.81 m (5 ft 11 1/2 in)
- Weight: 156 kg (344 lb)
- Website: http://ameblo.jp/tochisakae/

Sport
- Sport: Sumo
- Retired: January, 2008
- Heya: Kasugano
- Record: 480-423-86
- Debut: January, 1993
- Highest rank: Maegashira 1 (January, 2001)
- Elder name: Mihogaseki
- Championships: 2 (Jūryō); 1 (Makushita); 2 (Sandanme); 1 (Jonidan)
- Updated on January 2008

Tochisakae Atsushi (born June 27, 1974, as Atsushi Okamoto) is a former sumo wrestler from Saga Prefecture, Japan. He made his professional debut in 1993, reaching the top division for the first time in 2000. His highest rank was maegashira 1. He suffered many illness and injury problems throughout his career. He retired in 2008 and is now an elder of the Japan Sumo Association under the name of Mihogaseki, working as a coach at Kasugano stable.

== Career ==
Okamoto was born and raised in Nakano, Tokyo, although both his parents were from Saga and as he was fond of the city as well he chose to list it as his birthplace on the banzuke ranking sheets when he joined professional sumo. As a child he practised kendo, but was drawn to sumo after entering a Nakano ward Sumo Tournament in the fourth grade and finishing third. He trained at several heya, including Fujishima, Futagoyama and Dewanoumi, and while at middle school he trained at Nihon University Sumo Club with several future top division wrestlers such as Kushimaumi, Hamanoshima and Mainoumi. This led him to Saitama Sakae High School, where he became the High School Yokozuna in 1992.

Rather than go to university, he instead joined Kasugano stable in January 1993 through a connection of his uncle, after graduating straight from high school - the first High School Yokozuna to enter professional sumo in this way. He initially wrestled under his own surname of Okamoto and then used the sumo name of Tochinoiwa, before adopting his familiar name of Tochisakae in January 1999. He progressed through the lower divisions fairly quickly but shortly after winning the yusho in the makushita division he had surgery for empyema and side effects of the anaesthetic saw him lose the use of almost all the muscles in the right side of his body. He refused to miss tournaments, and after a long period of rehabilitation with acupuncture treatment he eventually made a full recovery.

He first reached a salaried rank in March 1998 when he was promoted to the jūryō division, but after pulling out with an injury towards the end of the tournament he fell back to makushita. More misfortune was to follow him when he earned promotion back to jūryō in November 1998, only to miss the entire tournament with another injury. After falling down to the fourth sandanme division he fought his way back up the ranks and was promoted to jūryō for the third time in May 2000. He made his debut in the top makuuchi division just two tournaments later in September 2000.

He reached his highest rank of maegashira 1 in January 2001, and fought all the yokozuna and ozeki for the first time, defeating ozeki Dejima. However, more injury problems struck him in July 2001 when he had to pull out with broken heel bones, and in 2002 he had to withdraw from three consecutive tournaments due to phlegmon, resulting in demotion back to jūryō. He won the jūryō championship in March 2003 and returned to the top division in July. After missing the whole of the January 2005 tournament he fell to the second division once again. His 26th and last tournament in makuuchi was in January 2006. In May 2007 at the rank of Jūryō 3 he lost his first ten bouts and pulled out on the 11th day, resulting in a return to makushita for the first time since 2000.

== Retirement from sumo ==
In January 2008 Tochisakae announced his retirement. He stayed with the Sumo Association as an elder under the name Takenawa, the stock borrowed from his still active stablemate Tochinonada. His danpatsu-shiki, or official retirement ceremony, was held jointly with another stablemate, Tochinohana, at the Ryōgoku Kokugikan in January 2009. In January 2011 he switched to the Kiyomigata elder name, owned by active wrestler Tochiozan, but in August 2014 he acquired the Mihogaseki stock for himself and is now known as Mihogaseki Oyakata.

== Fighting style ==
Tochisakae was an oshi-sumo specialist, favouring pushing and thrusting techniques. His most common winning kimarite was oshi-dashi (push out), followed by tsuki-otoshi (thrust over) and hiki-otoshi (pull down). By contrast, he won only around four percent of his matches by yori-kiri (force out), normally the most frequently used technique in sumo.

== Career record ==
Tochisakae Atsushi
Year	January Hatsu basho, Tokyo	March Haru basho, Osaka	May Natsu basho, Tokyo	July Nagoya basho, Nagoya	September Aki basho, Tokyo	November Kyūshū basho, Fukuoka
1993	(Maezumo)	West Jonokuchi #40; 5–2	West Jonidan #139; 7–0–PP; Champion	East Sandanme #96; 5–2	West Sandanme #60; 7–0; Champion	East Makushita #39; 3–4
1994	East Makushita #50; 2–5	East Sandanme #20; 6–1	East Makushita #46; 4–3	West Makushita #40; 7–0; Champion	East Makushita #4; 3–4	East Makushita #8; 1–6
1995	West Makushita #29; 2–5	West Makushita #48; 4–3	West Makushita #37; 6–1	West Makushita #16; 2–5	East Makushita #34; 4–3	West Makushita #27; 3–4
1996	West Makushita #37; 5–2	East Makushita #22; 3–4	East Makushita #32; 2–5	West Makushita #54; 5–2	East Makushita #33; 3–4	East Makushita #43; 6–1
1997	East Makushita #20; 4–3	East Makushita #16; 4–3	West Makushita #11; 4–3	East Makushita #6; 3–4	West Makushita #9; 5–2	East Makushita #4; 4–3
1998	East Makushita #3; 5–2	East Jūryō #12; 5–8–2	West Makushita #3; 4–3	West Makushita #2; 5–2	East Makushita #1; 5–2	East Jūryō #12; Sat out due to injury 0–0–15
1999	West Makushita #14; 5–2	West Makushita #5; 5–2	West Makushita #1; 1–2–4	West Makushita #21; Sat out due to injury 0–0–7	East Sandanme #1; 7–0–P; Champion	West Makushita #7; 5–2
2000	East Makushita #3; 4–3	East Makushita #1; 6–1	East Jūryō #9; 9–6	East Jūryō #6; 12–3	East Maegashira #15; 8–7	East Maegashira #6; 8–7
2001	West Maegashira #1; 4–11	West Maegashira #7; 8–7	East Maegashira #5; 7–8	West Maegashira #6; 4–5–6	West Maegashira #12; Sat out due to injury 0–0–15	West Maegashira #12; 7–8
2002	East Maegashira #14; 9–6	East Maegashira #10; 5–10	East Maegashira #15; 8–7	West Maegashira #10; 9–3–3	East Maegashira #4; 2–9–4	West Maegashira #12; 0–6–9
2003	West Jūryō #10; 8–7	East Jūryō #8; 10–5–PP; Champion	East Jūryō #3; 10–4–1	West Maegashira #11; 8–7	West Maegashira #6; 5–10	West Maegashira #10; 7–8
2004	West Maegashira #11; 9–6	East Maegashira #7; 7–8	West Maegashira #8; 7–8	West Maegashira #9; 6–9	East Maegashira #13; 5–10	West Jūryō #1; 10–5
2005	East Maegashira #15; Sat out due to injury 0–0–15	East Jūryō #10; 11–4	East Jūryō #2; 12–3; Champion	West Maegashira #12; 7–8	West Maegashira #13; 5–10	East Jūryō #1; 9–6
2006	East Maegashira #13; 4–10–1	West Jūryō #4; 6–9	West Jūryō #7; 9–6	East Jūryō #2; 6–9	East Jūryō #4; 6–9	East Jūryō #7; 7–8
2007	East Jūryō #8; 8–7	East Jūryō #6; 9–6	West Jūryō #3; 0–11–4	East Makushita #3; 4–3	East Makushita #2; 3–4	East Makushita #5; 4–3
2008	West Makushita #1; Retired; 2–4	x	x	x	x	x
Record given as wins–losses–absences Top division champion Top division runner-up Retired Lower divisions Non-participation Sanshō key: F=Fighting spirit; O=Outstanding performance; T=Technique Also shown: ★=Kinboshi; P=Playoff(s); Divisions: Makuuchi — Jūryō — Makushita — Sandanme — Jonidan — Jonokuchi Makuuchi ranks: Yokozuna — Ōzeki — Sekiwake — Komusubi — Maegashira

== See also ==
- Glossary of sumo terms
- List of sumo tournament second division champions
- List of past sumo wrestlers
- List of sumo elders
