= 2001 in sumo =

The following are the events in professional sumo during 2001.

== Tournaments ==
=== Hatsu basho ===
Ryogoku Kokugikan, Tokyo, 7 January – 21 January

2001 Hatsu basho results - Makuuchi Division
W		L		A	East			Rank	West			W		L		A
0	-	0	-	15	ø	(United States)	Akebono	Y		(United States)	**Musashimaru**	14	-	1	-	0
14	-	1	-	0		(Japan)	**Takanohana***	Y	ø							
10	-	5	-	0		(Japan)	**Kaiō**	O	ø	(Japan)	Chiyotaikai	2	-	2	-	11
7	-	8	-	0		(Japan)	Dejima	O		(Japan)	**Miyabiyama**	8	-	7	-	0
					ø			O		(Japan)	**Musōyama**	9	-	6	-	0
10	-	5	-	0		(Japan)	**Wakanosato**	S		(Japan)	Kotomitsuki	4	-	11	-	0
4	-	11	-	0		(Japan)	Takanowaka	K		(Japan)	**Tochinonada**	9	-	6	-	0
6	-	9	-	0		(Japan)	Takanonami	M1		(Japan)	Tochisakae	4	-	11	-	0
5	-	10	-	0		(Japan)	Kotonowaka	M2	ø	(Japan)	Hayateumi	0	-	0	-	15
9	-	6	-	0		(Japan)	**Wakanoyama**	M3		(Japan)	Kaihō	4	-	11	-	0
7	-	8	-	0		(Japan)	Akinoshima	M4		(Japan)	**Tochiazuma**	10	-	5	-	0
6	-	9	-	0		(Japan)	Tosanoumi	M5		(Japan)	Tamakasuga	7	-	8	-	0
4	-	11	-	0		(Japan)	Tochinohana	M6		(Japan)	**Chiyotenzan**	8	-	7	-	0
7	-	8	-	0		(Japan)	Higonoumi	M7		(Japan)	**Kotoryū**	9	-	6	-	0
10	-	5	-	0		(Mongolia)	**Kyokutenhō**	M8	ø	(Japan)	Tōki	0	-	0	-	15
6	-	9	-	0		(Japan)	Hamanoshima	M9		(Japan)	**Tokitsuumi**	8	-	7	-	0
8	-	7	-	0		(Mongolia)	**Kyokushūzan**	M10	ø	(Japan)	Oginishiki	0	-	3	-	13
6	-	9	-	0		(Japan)	Kinkaiyama	M11		(Japan)	Minatofuji	6	-	9	-	0
8	-	7	-	0		(Japan)	**Takatōriki**	M12		(Mongolia)	**Asashōryū**	9	-	6	-	0
7	-	8	-	0		(Japan)	Ōtsukasa	M13		(Japan)	Tamarikidō	6	-	9	-	0
8	-	7	-	0		(Japan)	**Asanowaka**	M14		(Japan)	Wakakosho	6	-	9	-	0

ø - Indicates a pull-out or absent rank
**winning record in bold**
**Yusho Winner**
***Won Playoff**

=== Haru basho ===
Osaka Prefectural Gymnasium, Osaka, 11 March – 25 March

2001 Haru basho results - Makuuchi Division
W		L		A	East			Rank	West			W		L		A
12	-	3	-	0		(Japan)	**Takanohana**	Y		(United States)	**Musashimaru**	12	-	3	-	0
13	-	2	-	0		(Japan)	**Kaiō**	O		(Japan)	**Musōyama**	12	-	3	-	0
7	-	8	-	0		(Japan)	Miyabiyama	O		(Japan)	**Dejima**	8	-	7	-	0
0	-	0	-	15	ø	(Japan)	Chiyotaikai	O	ø							
6	-	9	-	0		(Japan)	Wakanosato	S		(Japan)	**Tochinonada**	8	-	7	-	0
9	-	6	-	0		(Japan)	**Tochiazuma**	K		(Japan)	Wakanoyama	6	-	9	-	0
3	-	12	-	0		(Mongolia)	Kyokutenhō	M1	ø	(Japan)	Kotoryū	1	-	6	-	8
7	-	8	-	0		(Japan)	Chiyotenzan	M2		(Japan)	Hayateumi	6	-	9	-	0
6	-	9	-	0		(Japan)	Takanonami	M3		(Japan)	**Kotomitsuki**	10	-	5	-	0
6	-	9	-	0		(Japan)	Tokitsuumi	M4		(Japan)	**Takanowaka**	8	-	7	-	0
5	-	10	-	0		(Japan)	Akinoshima	M5	ø	(Mongolia)	Kyokushūzan	1	-	12	-	2
9	-	6	-	0		(Mongolia)	**Asashōryū**	M6		(Japan)	**Kotonowaka**	6	-	9	-	0
9	-	6	-	0		(Japan)	**Tamakasuga**	M7		(Japan)	**Tochisakae**	8	-	7	-	0
10	-	5	-	0		(Japan)	**Tosanoumi**	M8		(Japan)	Higonoumi	6	-	9	-	0
8	-	7	-	0		(Japan)	**Kaihō**	M9		(Japan)	Takatōriki	5	-	10	-	0
11	-	4	-	0		(Japan)	**Tamanoshima**	M10		(Japan)	Asanowaka	7	-	8	-	0
5	-	10	-	0		(Japan)	Hamanoshima	M11		(Japan)	Tochinohana	6	-	9	-	0
8	-	7	-	0		(Japan)	**Ōtsukasa**	M12		(Japan)	**Terao**	8	-	7	-	0
3	-	5	-	7	ø	(Japan)	Kinkaiyama	M13		(Japan)	**Jūmonji**	9	-	6	-	0
6	-	9	-	0		(Japan)	Minatofuji	M14		(Japan)	Daishi	4	-	11	-	0
8	-	7	-	0		(Japan)	**Aminishiki**	M15	ø							

ø - Indicates a pull-out or absent rank
**winning record in bold**
**Yusho Winner**

=== Natsu basho ===
Ryogoku Kokugikan, Tokyo, 13 May – 27 May

2001 Natsu basho results - Makuuchi Division
W		L		A	East			Rank	West			W		L		A
13	-	2	-	0		(Japan)	**Takanohana***	Y		(United States)	**Musashimaru**	13	-	2	-	0
4	-	5	-	6	ø	(Japan)	Kaiō	O		(Japan)	**Musōyama**	12	-	3	-	0
5	-	10	-	0		(Japan)	Dejima	O		(Japan)	**Miyabiyama**	9	-	6	-	0
12	-	3	-	0		(Japan)	**Chiyotaikai**	O	ø							
4	-	11	-	0		(Japan)	Tochinonada	S		(Japan)	**Tochiazuma**	9	-	6	-	0
9	-	6	-	0		(Japan)	**Kotomitsuki**	K		(Mongolia)	**Asashōryū**	8	-	7	-	0
8	-	7	-	0		(Japan)	**Wakanosato**	M1		(Japan)	Takanowaka	5	-	10	-	0
2	-	6	-	7	ø	(Japan)	Wakanoyama	M2		(Japan)	Chiyotenzan	4	-	11	-	0
5	-	10	-	0		(Japan)	Tamanoshima	M3		(Japan)	Tosanoumi	7	-	8	-	0
6	-	9	-	0		(Japan)	Tamakasuga	M4		(Japan)	**Hayateumi**	9	-	6	-	0
7	-	8	-	0		(Japan)	Tochisakae	M5		(Japan)	**Takanonami**	8	-	7	-	0
6	-	9	-	0		(Japan)	Kaihō	M6		(Japan)	Tokitsuumi	4	-	11	-	0
7	-	8	-	0		(Japan)	Jūmonji	M7		(Mongolia)	Kyokutenhō	6	-	9	-	0
8	-	7	-	0		(Japan)	**Ōtsukasa**	M8		(Japan)	**Kotonowaka**	9	-	6	-	0
2	-	13	-	0		(Japan)	Terao	M9		(Japan)	**Akinoshima**	8	-	7	-	0
0	-	0	-	15	ø	(Japan)	Kotoryū	M10		(Japan)	Aminishiki	7	-	8	-	0
11	-	4	-	0		(Japan)	**Higonoumi**	M11		(Japan)	Asanowaka	7	-	8	-	0
7	-	8	-	0		(Japan)	Wakatsutomu	M12		(Japan)	Hamanishiki	4	-	11	-	0
11	-	4	-	0		(Japan)	**Tōki**	M13		(Japan)	**Tochinohana**	9	-	6	-	0
8	-	7	-	0		(Japan)	**Daizen**	M14		(Japan)	Takatōriki	5	-	10	-	0
11	-	4	-	0		(Mongolia)	**Kyokushūzan**	M15	ø							

ø - Indicates a pull-out or absent rank
**winning record in bold**
**Yusho Winner**
***Won Playoff**

=== Nagoya basho ===
Aichi Prefectural Gymnasium, Nagoya, 8 July – 22 July

2001 Nagoya basho results - Makuuchi Division
W		L		A	East			Rank	West			W		L		A
0	-	0	-	15	ø	(Japan)	Takanohana	Y		(United States)	**Musashimaru**	12	-	3	-	0
11	-	4	-	0		(Japan)	**Chiyotaikai**	O		(Japan)	**Musōyama**	10	-	5	-	0
7	-	8	-	0		(Japan)	Miyabiyama	O	ø	(Japan)	Dejima	3	-	3	-	9
13	-	2	-	0		(Japan)	**Kaiō**	O	ø							
10	-	5	-	0		(Japan)	**Tochiazuma**	S		(Japan)	Kotomitsuki	6	-	9	-	0
7	-	8	-	0		(Mongolia)	Asashōryū	K		(Japan)	**Wakanosato**	9	-	6	-	0
4	-	11	-	0		(Japan)	Hayateumi	M1		(Japan)	Takanonami	5	-	10	-	0
8	-	7	-	0		(Japan)	**Kotonowaka**	M2		(Japan)	Higonoumi	3	-	12	-	0
6	-	9	-	0		(Japan)	Tochinonada	M3		(Japan)	Tōki	6	-	9	-	0
8	-	7	-	0		(Japan)	**Tosanoumi**	M4		(Japan)	Ōtsukasa	4	-	11	-	0
7	-	8	-	0		(Mongolia)	Kyokushūzan	M5		(Japan)	**Takanowaka**	9	-	6	-	0
4	-	11	-	0		(Japan)	Akinoshima	M6	ø	(Japan)	Tochisakae	4	-	5	-	6
8	-	7	-	0		(Japan)	**Tamakasuga**	M7		(Japan)	**Tamanoshima**	12	-	3	-	0
7	-	8	-	0		(Japan)	Tochinohana	M8		(Japan)	Chiyotenzan	6	-	9	-	0
4	-	11	-	0		(Japan)	Jūmonji	M9		(Japan)	Kitazakura	6	-	9	-	0
8	-	7	-	0		(Japan)	Kotoryū	M10		(Japan)	**Kaihō**	9	-	6	-	0
8	-	7	-	0		(Mongolia)	**Kyokutenhō**	M11		(Japan)	**Daizen**	8	-	7	-	0
0	-	0	-	15	ø	(Japan)	Wakanoyama	M12		(Japan)	Aminishiki	7	-	8	-	0
5	-	10	-	0		(Japan)	Asanowaka	M13		(Japan)	**Tokitsuumi**	11	-	4	-	0
7	-	8	-	0		(Japan)	Wakatsutomu	M14		(Japan)	**Oginishiki**	9	-	6	-	0
5	-	10	-	0		(Japan)	Minatofuji	M15	ø							

ø - Indicates a pull-out or absent rank
**winning record in bold**
**Yusho Winner**

=== Aki basho ===
Ryogoku Kokugikan, Tokyo, 9 September – 23 September

2001 Aki basho results - Makuuchi Division
W		L		A	East			Rank	West			W		L		A
9	-	6	-	0		(United States)	**Musashimaru**	Y	ø	(Japan)	Takanohana	0	-	0	-	15
0	-	4	-	11	ø	(Japan)	Kaiō	O	ø	(Japan)	Chiyotaikai	4	-	5	-	6
10	-	5	-	0		(Japan)	**Musōyama**	O	ø	(Japan)	Miyabiyama	3	-	7	-	5
12	-	3	-	0		(Japan)	**Tochiazuma**	S		(Japan)	Dejima	5	-	10	-	0
7	-	8	-	0		(Japan)	Wakanosato	K		(Japan)	Tamanoshima	7	-	8	-	0
7	-	8	-	0		(Japan)	Kotonowaka	M1		(Mongolia)	**Asashōryū**	10	-	5	-	0
13	-	2	-	0		(Japan)	**Kotomitsuki**	M2		(Japan)	**Takanowaka**	8	-	7	-	0
8	-	7	-	0		(Japan)	**Tosanoumi**	M3		(Japan)	Tamakasuga	5	-	10	-	0
10	-	5	-	0		(Japan)	**Kaihō**	M4		(Japan)	**Tokitsuumi**	9	-	6	-	0
5	-	10	-	0		(Japan)	Takanonami	M5		(Japan)	**Tochinonada**	8	-	7	-	0
6	-	9	-	0		(Mongolia)	Kyokushūzan	M6		(Japan)	Tōki	7	-	8	-	0
6	-	9	-	0		(Japan)	Hayateumi	M7		(Japan)	**Kotoryū**	9	-	6	-	0
9	-	6	-	0		(Mongolia)	**Kyokutenhō**	M8		(Japan)	**Daizen**	9	-	6	-	0
5	-	10	-	0		(Japan)	Higonoumi	M9		(Japan)	Ōtsukasa	7	-	8	-	0
0	-	4	-	11	ø	(Japan)	Tochinohana	M10		(Japan)	**Oginishiki**	8	-	7	-	0
8	-	7	-	0		(Japan)	**Chiyotenzan**	M11		(Japan)	**Akinoshima**	9	-	6	-	0
8	-	7	-	0		(Japan)	**Wakanoyama**	M12	ø	(Japan)	Tochisakae	0	-	0	-	15
8	-	7	-	0		(Japan)	**Kitazakura**	M13		(Japan)	Aminishiki	7	-	8	-	0
6	-	9	-	0		(Japan)	Takatōriki	M14		(Japan)	**Hamanishiki**	8	-	7	-	0
5	-	10	-	0		(Japan)	Daishi	M15		(Japan)	Wakatsutomu	3	-	12	-	0

ø - Indicates a pull-out or absent rank
**winning record in bold**
**Yusho Winner**

=== Kyushu basho ===
Fukuoka International Centre, Kyushu, 11 November – 25 November

2001 Kyushu basho results - Makuuchi Division
W		L		A	East			Rank	West			W		L		A
13	-	2	-	0		(United States)	**Musashimaru**	Y	ø	(Japan)	Takanohana	0	-	0	-	15
9	-	6	-	0		(Japan)	**Musōyama**	O	ø	(Japan)	Chiyotaikai	0	-	0	-	15
10	-	5	-	0		(Japan)	**Kaiō**	O	ø							
12	-	3	-	0		(Japan)	**Tochiazuma**	S		(Japan)	**Kotomitsuki**	9	-	6	-	0
					ø			S	ø	(Japan)	Miyabiyama	0	-	0	-	15
10	-	5	-	0		(Mongolia)	**Asashōryū**	K		(Japan)	Kaihō	5	-	10	-	0
10	-	5	-	0		(Japan)	**Wakanosato**	M1		(Japan)	Tamanoshima	7	-	8	-	0
6	-	9	-	0		(Japan)	Takanowaka	M2		(Japan)	Tosanoumi	5	-	10	-	0
2	-	13	-	0		(Japan)	Tokitsuumi	M3		(Japan)	Dejima	7	-	8	-	0
7	-	8	-	0		(Japan)	Kotonowaka	M4		(Japan)	Tochinonada	7	-	8	-	0
1	-	1	-	13	ø	(Japan)	Kotoryū	M5		(Mongolia)	**Kyokutenhō**	8	-	7	-	0
6	-	9	-	0		(Japan)	Daizen	M6		(Japan)	**Akinoshima**	8	-	7	-	0
6	-	9	-	0		(Japan)	Tamakasuga	M7		(Japan)	**Tōki**	8	-	7	-	0
5	-	10	-	0		(Japan)	Oginishiki	M8		(Japan)	**Chiyotenzan**	8	-	7	-	0
10	-	5	-	0		(Mongolia)	**Kyokushūzan**	M9		(Japan)	Wakanoyama	6	-	9	-	0
9	-	6	-	0		(Japan)	**Takanonami**	M10	ø	(Japan)	**Hayateumi**	8	-	2	-	5
8	-	7	-	0		(Japan)	**Ōtsukasa**	M11		(Japan)	Kitazakura	5	-	10	-	0
7	-	8	-	0		(Japan)	Hamanishiki	M12		(Japan)	Tochisakae	7	-	8	-	0
4	-	11	-	0		(Japan)	Aogiyama	M13	ø	(Japan)	Higonoumi	4	-	8	-	3
8	-	7	-	0		(Japan)	**Kōbō**	M14		(Japan)	**Aminishiki**	8	-	7	-	0
8	-	7	-	0		(Japan)	**Tamarikidō**	M15		(Japan)	**Buyūzan**	10	-	5	-	0

ø - Indicates a pull-out or absent rank
**winning record in bold**
**Yusho Winner**

== News ==
=== January ===
- 21: Yokozuna Takanohana wins his first yusho in over two years, defeating fellow yokozuna Musashimaru in a playoff after both men finish on 14–1. Tochinonada wins the Technique Award. Wakanoyama scores 9–6 from maegashira 3, his best ever result, and wins the Fighting Spirit Prize. Wakanosato receives the Outstanding Performance Award for his win over Musashimaru. Tamanonada wins the juryo championship and promotion back to the top makuuchi division, and changes his name to Tamanoshima. Maegashira Toki is suspended from the tournament for being involved in a traffic accident in December, and drops to juryo. As a result, the Takasago stable is without any makuuchi wrestlers for the first time in its history.
- 22: Yokozuna Akebono, who won his 11th championship in the previous tournament in November but was absent through injury from this one, announces his retirement, due to the constant pain in both his knees. He will stay in sumo as a coach at his Azumazeki stable, under the elder name Akebono Oyakata.
- 29: The Japan Sumo Association award Akebono a bonus of 100 million yen for his services to sumo, tying the record amount awarded to Chiyonofuji upon his retirement in 1991.

=== February ===
- 21: The Sumo Association reduces the height requirement for new entrants from 173 cm (5 ft 8 in) to 167 cm (5 ft 5 1/2 in), due to a shortage of applicants. 13 tryouts are accepted.

=== March ===
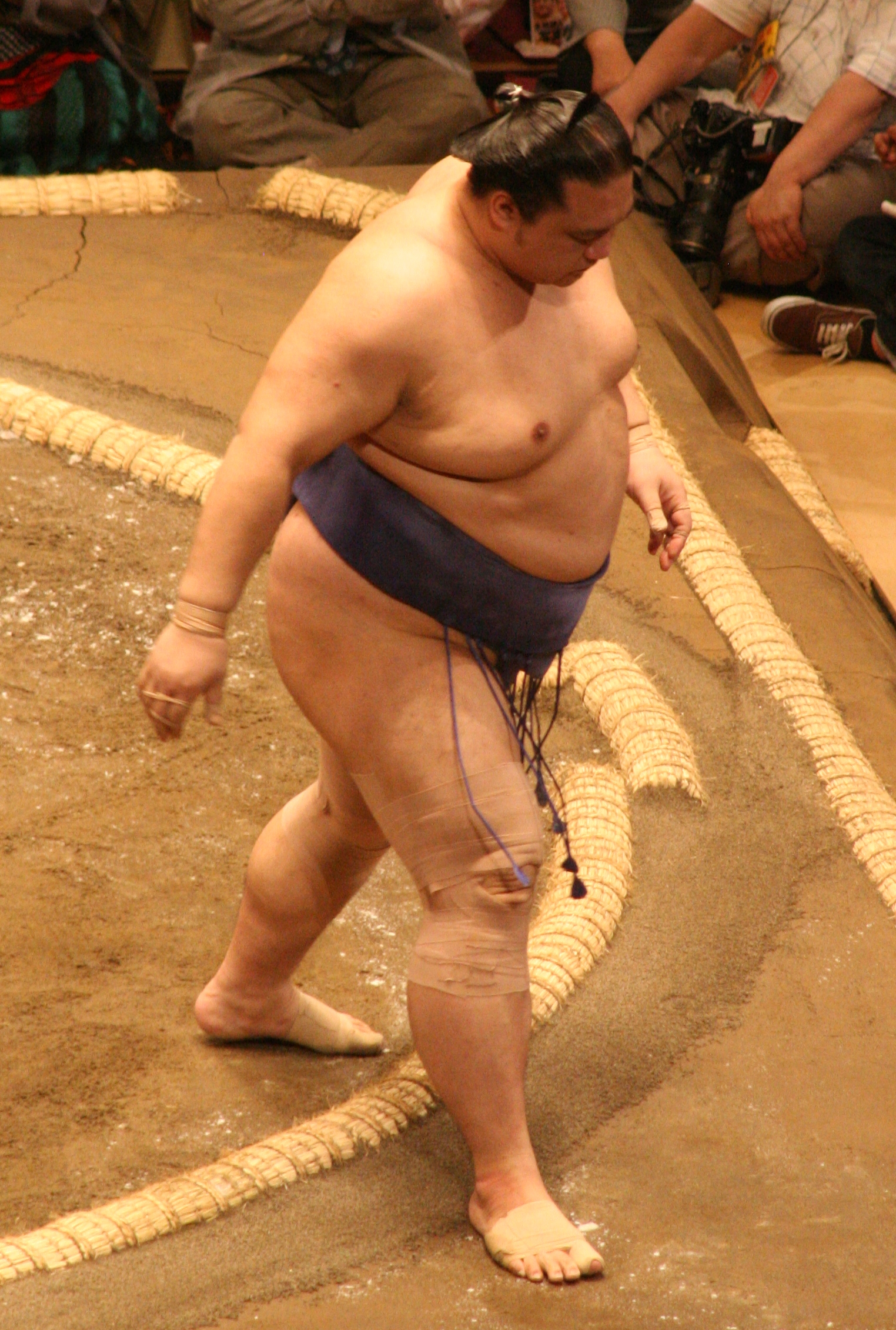
Kaio won two tournaments in 2001.

- 25: Ozeki Kaio wins his second championship. He finishes on 13–2, one win ahead of Takanohana, Musashimaru and fellow ozeki Musoyama. Maegashira Tamanoshima gets the Fighting Spirit Award for his eleven wins. Kotomitsuki receives his second Technique prize, while Tochinonada and Tochiazuma share the Outstanding Performance Prize. Wakatsutomu wins the juryo championship with just a 10–5 score, after a playoff with Toki. Former maegashira Daihisho retires.

=== May ===
- 22: Takanohana wins his 22nd yusho in dramatic fashion, beating Musashimaru in a playoff despite clearly suffering from serious knee ligament damage sustained in a defeat to Musoyama the previous day. Kaio pulls out with back pain after losing four bouts in the first eight days. Kotomitsuki receives the Technique Award while fellow komusubi Asashoryu gets the Outstanding Performance Prize in his first tournament at the rank. Kitazakura wins his first juryo yusho. Former maegashira Shikishima retires.

=== June ===
- 5: Futagoyama Oyakata announces that his son Takanohana will not take part in the next tournament, and indicates that he will require a lengthy layoff.

=== July ===
- 22: Kaio wins his second championship of the year with a 13–2 record despite limited training due to his ongoing back trouble. Musashimaru is runner up on 12–3 alongside Tamanoshima who gets another Fighting Spirit Award. The Technique Prize is shared between Tochiazuma and Tokitsuumi while Wakanosato receives the Outstanding Performance Prize. Dejima is demoted from the ozeki rank. Buyuzan wins the juryo championship, coming through a series of playoffs after a record eight men (Buyuzan, Terao, Oikari, Tamarikido, Takatoriki, Sentoryu, Hamanishiki and Wakatoba) all finish on the same score, just 9–6.
- 23: It is revealed that Takanohana has travelled to Paris to have his injured knee operated on by a specialist.

=== September ===
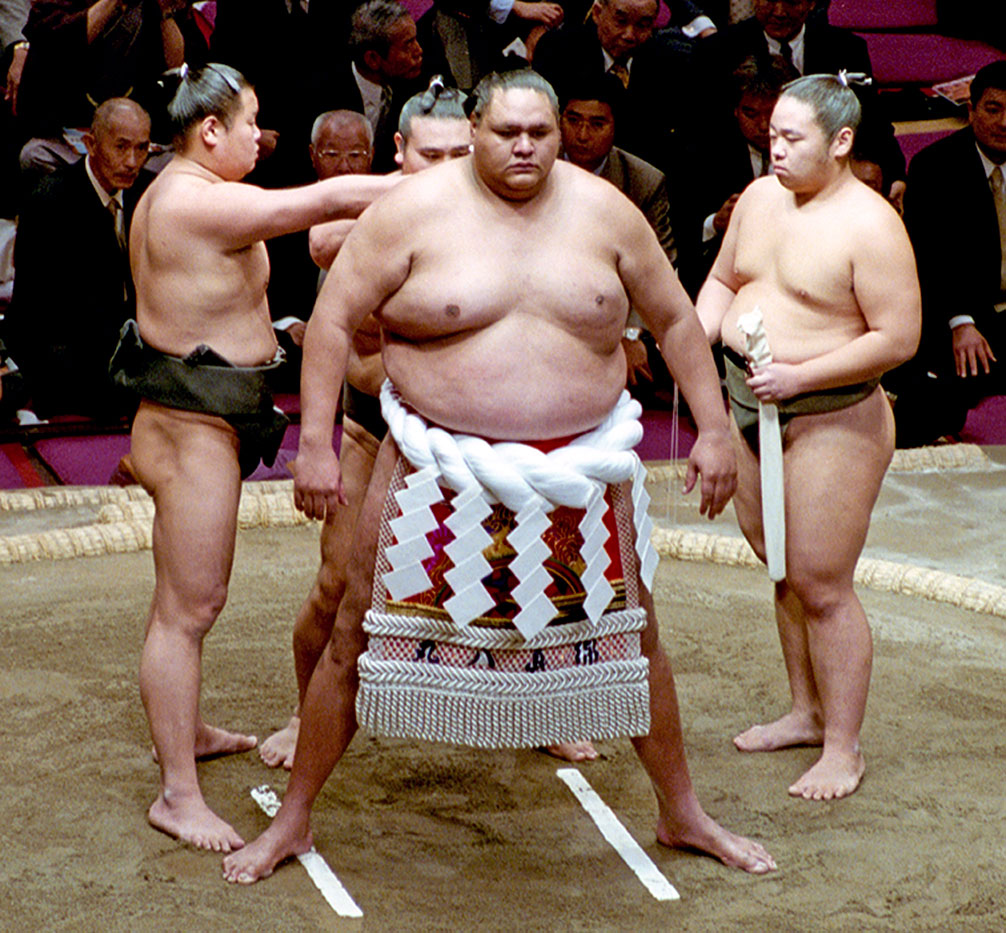
Akebono at his retirement ceremony

- 23: Maegashira 2 Kotomitsuki wins his first championship with a 13–2 record, and takes all three special prizes. Sekiwake Tochiazuma is runner-up on 12–3. Kaiho also receives a share of the Technique Prize, while Asashoryu gets a share of the Fighting Spirit prize. Takanohana is still recuperating from his surgery, and Kaio, Chiyotaikai and Miyabiyama all drop out early through injury. Miyabiyama joins his stablemate Dejima in being demoted from ozeki. Musashimaru finishes with a mediocre 9–6. Former maegashira Aogiyama wins the juryo yusho.
- 29: Akebono's retirement ceremony or danpatsu-shiki takes place at the Kokugikan. Guests taking part in the hair-cutting ritual include US Ambassador to Japan Howard Baker, an ambassador representing the French President (and sumo fan) Jacques Chirac, Konishiki, Takanohana and finally Akebono's stablemaster Azumazeki Oyakata.

=== November ===
- 25: Musashimaru wins his first yusho since September 2000 with a 13–2 score. Tochiazuma is once again runner-up on 12–3 and seals his promotion to ozeki. He also receives his seventh Technique Prize. Takanohana, Chiyotaikai and Miyabiyama sit out, but Kaio returns to score 10–5. Asashoryu and Wakanosato share the Fighting Spirit Prize with top division debutant Buyuzan. Oikari wins the juryo championship. Former komusubi Tomonohana retires.
- 28: Tochiazuma's promotion to ozeki is officially confirmed. He becomes the fifth son of a former wrestler to make the ozeki rank.

== Deaths ==
- 17 January: former komusubi Wakabayama, also former Shikoroyama Oyakata, aged 78, of cerebral thrombosis.
- 27 January: Onogawa Oyakata, former maegashira Hachiya, aged 50, of mouth cancer.

== See also ==
- Glossary of sumo terms
- List of past sumo wrestlers
- List of years in sumo
- List of yokozuna
