= Tochinohana Hitoshi =

Japanese sumo wrestler

Personal information
- Native name: 栃乃花 仁
- Born: Hitoshi Yachi; 28 February 1973 (age 53) Yamagata, Iwate, Japan
- Height: 1.85 m (6 ft 1 in)
- Weight: 138 kg (304 lb)

Sport
- Sport: Sumo
- Retired: January 2008
- Heya: Kasugano
- Record: 449-439-32
- Debut: March 1995
- Highest rank: Komusubi (November 2000)
- Elder name: Hatachiyama
- Championships: 1 (Jūryō); 1 (Jonokuchi)
- Special Prizes: Fighting Spirit (2); Technique (2)
- Updated on January 2008

Tochinohana Hitoshi (栃乃花 仁; born 28 February 1973 as Hitoshi Yachi) is a former Japanese sumo wrestler from Yamagata, Iwate. A former amateur champion, he turned professional in 1995, reaching the top makuuchi division in 2000. His highest rank was komusubi. He retired in 2008 and is now a sumo coach.

== Career ==
Tochinohana practised amateur sumo at Meiji University, but unlike many former amateur wrestlers, he still began his professional career at the very bottom of the rankings. He joined Kasugano stable in March 1995 at the age of 22. Initially fighting under his own surname, Yachi, it took him four years to become a sekitori. Upon reaching the second highest jūryō division in January 1999 he adopted the shikona Tochinohana.

After capturing the jūryō yūshō or tournament championship with a 13-2 record, he made his debut in the top makuuchi division in May 2000. There he defeated ozeki Chiyotaikai and Takanonami, finished in equal third place with 12 wins against three losses and received two special prizes for Fighting Spirit and Technique. In the September 2000 tournament he defeated another ozeki and was awarded his second Technique prize. He was promoted to komusubi in the next tournament in November, but could only manage a 3-12 record. This was to be his only tournament in the titled sanyaku ranks.

Over the next couple of years Tochinohana struggled to maintain his makuuchi position, and a serious back injury forced him all the way down to the unsalaried makushita division in 2004. However, he fought his way back to makuuchi in November 2005, where he finished runner-up to yokozuna Asashoryu, scoring eleven wins and receiving the Fighting Spirit Award. In an interview, Tochinohana's father said he regarded this as the most memorable achievement of his son's career. He remained in the top division until May 2007, when he could only win only four bouts at maegashira 13 and was demoted back to jūryō.

== Retirement from sumo ==
After a disastrous 2-13 record in November 2007 Tochinohana fell to Jūryō 14 West, making him the lowest ranking sekitori. In January 2008, after losing nine of his first twelve bouts, he announced his retirement. He has stayed with the Sumo Association as an toshiyori, or elder, under the name Hatachiyama, and is working as a coach at Kasugano stable. His danpatsu-shiki, or official retirement ceremony, was held jointly with his stablemate Tochisakae at the Ryōgoku Kokugikan in January 2009.

== Fighting style ==
Tochinohana's most common winning kimarite was a straightforward yori-kiri, or force out, and he preferred a migi yotsu, or left hand outside, right hand inside grip on his opponent's mawashi. He also regularly won with oshi-dashi, or push out.

== Career record ==
Tochinohana Hitoshi
Year	January Hatsu basho, Tokyo	March Haru basho, Osaka	May Natsu basho, Tokyo	July Nagoya basho, Nagoya	September Aki basho, Tokyo	November Kyūshū basho, Fukuoka
1995	x	(Maezumo)	East Jonokuchi #23; 7–0–P; Champion	West Jonidan #39; 6–1	West Sandanme #80; 6–1	East Sandanme #28; 6–1
1996	West Makushita #50; 3–4	West Sandanme #5; 6–1	East Makushita #34; 4–3	Makushita #23; 4–3	West Makushita #17; 3–4	West Makushita #25; 3–4
1997	East Makushita #33; 4–3	West Makushita #23; 4–3	East Makushita #18; 2–5	East Makushita #34; 5–2	West Makushita #20; 4–3	West Makushita #15; 4–3
1998	East Makushita #11; 3–4	West Makushita #19; 4–3	East Makushita #16; 5–2	West Makushita #8; 4–3	East Makushita #6; 5–2	East Makushita #3; 5–2
1999	West Jūryō #12; 8–7	East Jūryō #11; 7–8	East Jūryō #13; 6–9	West Makushita #1; 6–1	West Jūryō #11; 8–7	West Jūryō #9; 7–8
2000	East Jūryō #11; 9–6	West Jūryō #6; 13–2–PP; Champion	East Maegashira #12; 12–3; FT	West Maegashira #1; 5–10	East Maegashira #7; 10–5; T	East Komusubi #1; 3–12
2001	East Maegashira #6; 4–11	West Maegashira #11; 6–9	West Maegashira #13; 9–6	East Maegashira #8; 7–8	East Maegashira #10; 0–4–11	East Jūryō #6; Sat out due to injury 0–0–15
2002	East Jūryō #6; 9–6	East Jūryō #1; 8–7	West Maegashira #13; 6–9	East Jūryō #1; 8–7	East Maegashira #14; 8–7	East Maegashira #12; 6–9
2003	West Maegashira #14; 7–8	East Maegashira #15; 5–10	West Jūryō #4; 9–6	West Jūryō #1; 4–11	West Jūryō #7; 5–10	East Jūryō #11; 8–7
2004	East Jūryō #6; 1–8–6	East Makushita #4; 1–6	West Makushita #23; 3–4	East Makushita #30; 6–1	West Makushita #12; 6–1	East Makushita #4; 4–3
2005	West Makushita #1; 4–3	West Jūryō #13; 10–5	West Jūryō #8; 11–4	West Jūryō #2; 7–8	West Jūryō #3; 10–5	East Maegashira #14; 11–4; F
2006	West Maegashira #3; 4–11	East Maegashira #10; 7–8	West Maegashira #10; 5–10	East Maegashira #15; 8–7	West Maegashira #13; 7–8	West Maegashira #13; 8–7
2007	West Maegashira #11; 5–10	West Maegashira #15; 8–7	West Maegashira #13; 4–11	West Jūryō #2; 6–9	West Jūryō #4; 8–7	East Jūryō #3; 2–13
2008	West Jūryō #14; Retired; 3–9	x	x	x	x	x
Record given as wins–losses–absences Top division champion Top division runner-up Retired Lower divisions Non-participation Sanshō key: F=Fighting spirit; O=Outstanding performance; T=Technique Also shown: ★=Kinboshi; P=Playoff(s); Divisions: Makuuchi — Jūryō — Makushita — Sandanme — Jonidan — Jonokuchi Makuuchi ranks: Yokozuna — Ōzeki — Sekiwake — Komusubi — Maegashira

== See also ==
- Glossary of sumo terms
- List of sumo tournament top division runners-up
- List of sumo tournament second division champions
- List of past sumo wrestlers
- List of sumo elders
- List of komusubi
