= Wakatsutomu Hiroki =

Japanese sumo wrestler

Personal information
- Native name: 若孜 浩気
- Born: Hiroki Nakao; 13 February 1973 (age 53) Ichikawa, Chiba, Japan
- Height: 1.72 m (5 ft 7 1/2 in)
- Weight: 159 kg (351 lb)

Sport
- Sport: Sumo
- Retired: July, 2006
- Heya: Matsugane
- Record: 275-243-49
- Debut: November 1995
- Highest rank: Maegashira 12 (May 2001)
- Championships: 1 (Jūryō); 3 (Makushita)
- Updated on September 2012

Wakatsutomu Hiroki (born 13 February 1973 as Hiroki Nakao, わかつとむ ひろき) is a former sumo wrestler from Ichikawa, Chiba, Japan. He made his professional debut in November 1995 and reached the top division in May 2001. His highest rank was maegashira 12. He retired from the sumo world in July 2006.

== Career record ==
Wakatsutomu Hiroki
Year	January Hatsu basho, Tokyo	March Haru basho, Osaka	May Natsu basho, Tokyo	July Nagoya basho, Nagoya	September Aki basho, Tokyo	November Kyūshū basho, Fukuoka
1995	x	x	x	x	x	Makushita tsukedashi #60; 4–3
1996	West Makushita #51; 4–3	West Makushita #42; 3–4	East Makushita #54; 6–1	East Makushita #27; Sat out due to injury 0–0–7	East Sandanme #7; 6–1	East Makushita #36; 4–3
1997	East Makushita #26; 5–2	West Makushita #15; 4–3	East Makushita #8; 3–4	East Makushita #15; 4–3	East Makushita #10; 4–3	West Makushita #7; 5–2
1998	West Makushita #3; 1–2–4	West Makushita #25; Sat out due to injury 0–0–7	West Makushita #25; 5–2	West Makushita #15; 4–3	East Makushita #12; 2–5	West Makushita #28; 7–0; Champion
1999	East Makushita #3; 6–1	East Jūryō #12; 6–9	East Makushita #3; 3–4	West Makushita #7; 5–2	East Makushita #3; 3–4	West Makushita #6; 5–2
2000	East Makushita #2; 2–5	West Makushita #10; 4–3	East Makushita #7; 4–3	West Makushita #5; 5–2	West Jūryō #9; 9–6	East Jūryō #7; 7–8
2001	West Jūryō #8; 9–6	East Jūryō #3; 10–5–P; Champion	East Maegashira #12; 7–8	East Maegashira #14; 7–8	West Maegashira #15; 3–12	East Jūryō #7; 2–13
2002	West Makushita #3; 3–4	East Makushita #7; 1–6	East Makushita #28; 4–3	West Makushita #20; Sat out due to injury 0–0–7	East Sandanme #1; 6–1	East Makushita #29; 5–2
2003	East Makushita #15; 4–3	East Makushita #11; 7–0; Champion	West Jūryō #11; 7–8	East Jūryō #12; 6–9	West Makushita #1; 5–2	East Jūryō #12; 7–8
2004	East Jūryō #11; 9–6	West Jūryō #5; 0–5–10	West Makushita #2; Sat out due to injury 0–0–7	West Makushita #42; 4–3	East Makushita #36; 5–2	East Makushita #23; 5–2
2005	East Makushita #13; 3–4	West Makushita #19; 3–4	East Makushita #28; 3–4	West Makushita #33; 7–0; Champion	West Makushita #3; 3–4	East Makushita #6; 2–5
2006	East Makushita #18; 2–5	West Makushita #32; 3–4	West Makushita #39; 3–4	West Makushita #48; Retired; 0–0–7	x	x
Record given as wins–losses–absences Top division champion Top division runner-up Retired Lower divisions Non-participation Sanshō key: F=Fighting spirit; O=Outstanding performance; T=Technique Also shown: ★=Kinboshi; P=Playoff(s); Divisions: Makuuchi — Jūryō — Makushita — Sandanme — Jonidan — Jonokuchi Makuuchi ranks: Yokozuna — Ōzeki — Sekiwake — Komusubi — Maegashira

== See also ==
- List of sumo tournament second division champions
- Glossary of sumo terms
- List of past sumo wrestlers
