= Tochihikari Masayuki =

Japanese sumo wrestler (1933–1977)

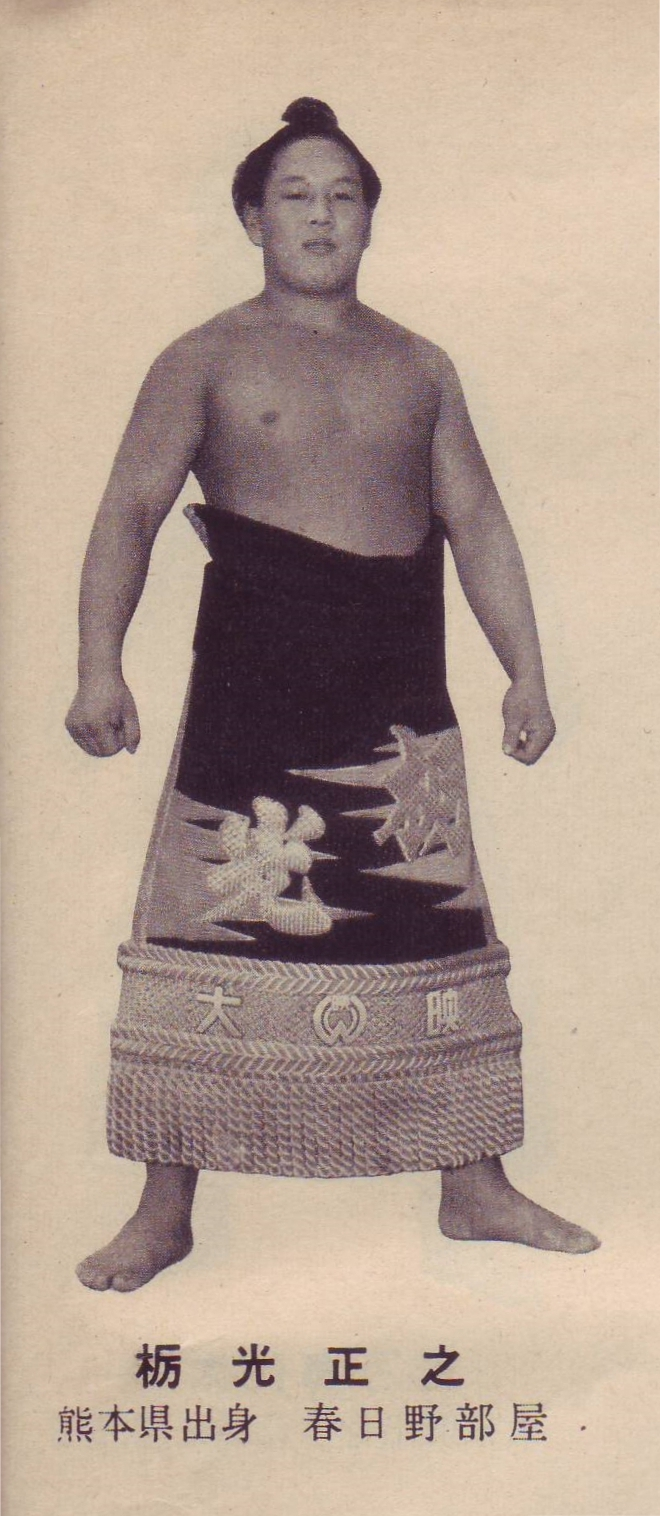

Personal information
- Native name: 栃光 正之
- Born: Ario Nakamura; 29 August 1933 Kumamoto, Japan
- Died: 28 March 1977 (aged 43)
- Height: 1.76 m (5 ft 9 1/2 in)
- Weight: 128 kg (282 lb)

Sport
- Sport: Sumo
- Retired: January 1966
- Heya: Kasugano
- Record: 577–431–11
- Debut: May 1952
- Highest rank: Ōzeki (July 1962)
- Elder name: Chiganoura
- Championships: 1 (Jūryō); 1 (Makushita)
- Special Prizes: Outstanding Performance (3); Fighting Spirit (2)
- Gold Stars: 4 Yoshibayama (2); Kagamisato; Asashio
- Updated on June 2020

Tochihikari Masayuki (29 August 1933 – 28 March 1977) was a sumo wrestler from Kumamoto Prefecture in Japan who reached the second highest rank of ōzeki in 1962. He joined Kasugano stable in 1952 and reached the top makuuchi division in 1955. He never won a top division championship but was a tournament runner-up four times. He was promoted to ōzeki in May 1962 alongside his stablemate Tochinoumi. He fought as an ōzeki for 22 tournaments but lost the rank after recording three consecutive losing scores and immediately announced his retirement in January 1966. He became an elder of the Japan Sumo Association under the name Chiganoura. He was a judge of tournament bouts and was involved in both the incorrect decision to award a win to Toda that stopped Taiho's 45 bout winning streak in March 1969 and the famous decision in January 1972 to declare Kitanofuji the winner over Takanohana by kabai-te. He died of rectal cancer at the age of 43. His shikona of Tochihikari was subsequently used by a later wrestler from Kasugano stable, also known as Kaneshiro Kofuku.

== Pre-modern career record ==
- In 1953 the New Year tournament was begun and the Spring tournament began to be held in Osaka.

Tochihikari Masayuki
-	Spring Haru basho, Tokyo	Summer Natsu basho, Tokyo	Autumn Aki basho, Tokyo
1952	x	Shinjo; 2–1	West Jonidan #24; 7–1
Record given as wins–losses–absences Top division champion Top division runner-up Retired Lower divisions Non-participation Sanshō key: F=Fighting spirit; O=Outstanding performance; T=Technique Also shown: ★=Kinboshi; P=Playoff(s); Divisions: Makuuchi — Jūryō — Makushita — Sandanme — Jonidan — Jonokuchi Makuuchi ranks: Yokozuna — Ōzeki — Sekiwake — Komusubi — Maegashira

-	New Year Hatsu basho, Tokyo	Spring Haru basho, Osaka	Summer Natsu basho, Tokyo	Autumn Aki basho, Tokyo
1953	East Sandanme #42; 7–1	West Sandanme #16; 4–4	West Sandanme #13; 7–1	West Makushita #38; 6–2
1954	East Makushita #28; 5–3	East Makushita #18; 8–0; Champion	East Jūryō #22; 10–5	West Jūryō #14; 11–4
1955	East Jūryō #8; 9–6	West Jūryō #3; 15–0; Champion	East Maegashira #13; 10–5	West Maegashira #5; 8–7
1956	West Maegashira #2; 7–8 ★	West Maegashira #2; 5–10	West Maegashira #6; 8–7	West Maegashira #5; 6–9
Record given as wins–losses–absences Top division champion Top division runner-up Retired Lower divisions Non-participation Sanshō key: F=Fighting spirit; O=Outstanding performance; T=Technique Also shown: ★=Kinboshi; P=Playoff(s); Divisions: Makuuchi — Jūryō — Makushita — Sandanme — Jonidan — Jonokuchi Makuuchi ranks: Yokozuna — Ōzeki — Sekiwake — Komusubi — Maegashira

== Modern career record ==
- Since the addition of the Kyushu tournament in 1957 and the Nagoya tournament in 1958, the yearly schedule has remained unchanged.

Year	January Hatsu basho, Tokyo	March Haru basho, Osaka	May Natsu basho, Tokyo	July Nagoya basho, Nagoya	September Aki basho, Tokyo	November Kyūshū basho, Fukuoka
1957	West Maegashira #6; 12–3	West Komusubi #1; 6–9	West Maegashira #1; 5–10 ★	Not held	East Maegashira #6; 9–6 ★	East Maegashira #2; 4–11
1958	West Maegashira #8; 11–4	East Maegashira #2; 8–7	East Komusubi #1; 7–8	East Maegashira #1; 9–6	East Komusubi #1; 4–11	East Maegashira #4; 8–7
1959	East Maegashira #1; 9–6	West Komusubi #2; 9–6	West Sekiwake #1; 10–5; F	East Sekiwake #1; 10–5	East Sekiwake #1; 8–7	East Sekiwake #1; 5–10
1960	West Maegashira #1; 8–7	East Komusubi #2; 8–7	East Komusubi #1; 6–9	West Maegashira #1; 7–8	East Maegashira #1; 6–9	West Maegashira #5; 6–9
1961	East Maegashira #7; 8–7	West Maegashira #3; 8–7; O★	West Maegashira #1; 8–7	East Komusubi #2; 10–5; F	West Sekiwake #1; 8–7	West Sekiwake #1; 3–12
1962	West Maegashira #4; 11–4	West Komusubi #1; 10–5; O	West Sekiwake #2; 13–2; O	West Ōzeki #2; 11–4	East Ōzeki #1; 11–4	West Ōzeki #1; 10–5
1963	West Ōzeki #1; 9–6	East Ōzeki #2; 13–2	East Ōzeki #1; 9–6	East Ōzeki #2; 12–3	East Ōzeki #2; 6–9	East Ōzeki #3; 8–7
1964	East Ōzeki #3; 9–6	East Ōzeki #2; 4–6–5	West Ōzeki #2; 11–4	East Ōzeki #2; 12–3	East Ōzeki #2; 8–7	West Ōzeki #2; 8–7
1965	West Ōzeki #2; 11–4	East Ōzeki #1; 9–6	West Ōzeki #1; 3–6–6	East Ōzeki #2; 8–7	West Ōzeki #1; 6–9	West Ōzeki #1; 5–10
1966	East Ōzeki #2; Retired; 5–10	x	x	x	x	x
Record given as wins–losses–absences Top division champion Top division runner-up Retired Lower divisions Non-participation Sanshō key: F=Fighting spirit; O=Outstanding performance; T=Technique Also shown: ★=Kinboshi; P=Playoff(s); Divisions: Makuuchi — Jūryō — Makushita — Sandanme — Jonidan — Jonokuchi Makuuchi ranks: Yokozuna — Ōzeki — Sekiwake — Komusubi — Maegashira

== See also ==
- Glossary of sumo terms
- List of past sumo wrestlers
- List of sumo tournament top division runners-up
- List of sumo tournament second division champions
- List of ōzeki
