= Hachiya Toshiyuki =

Japanese sumo wrestler (1950–2001)

Personal information
- Native name: 蜂矢 敏行
- Born: Hachiya Toshiyuki; 16 November 1950 Motosu, Gifu, Japan
- Died: 27 January 2001 (aged 50)
- Height: 1.80 m (5 ft 11 in)
- Weight: 108 kg (238 lb; 17.0 st)

Sport
- Sport: Sumo
- Retired: September, 1987
- Heya: Kasugano
- Record: 638-625-7
- Debut: September, 1968
- Highest rank: Maegashira 6 (November, 1984)
- Elder name: Onogawa
- Championships: 1 (Jūryō); 1 (Makushita)
- Updated on June 2020

Hachiya Toshiyuki (蜂矢敏行) (16 November 1950 – 27 January 2001) was a sumo wrestler from Motosu, Gifu, Japan. He made his professional debut in September 1968. He holds the record jointly with Oshio for the most tournaments fought in the juryo division, at 55. He spent four tournaments in the top makuuchi division, peaking at maegashira 6 in November 1984. At around 108 kg (238 lb) he was one of the lightest sekitori. He retired in 1987 and became an elder of the Japan Sumo Association under the name Onogawa until his death in 2001.

== Career ==
He was born in Motosu, Gifu and joined Kasugano stable in September 1968, recruited by ex-yokozuna Tochinishiki. He had tried to join a year previously but was below the minimum weight requirement of 75 kg (165 lb). He used his own surname of Hachiya rather than a traditional shikona for nearly all of his career, as it already had an unusual ring to it (literally meaning "bee's arrow"). As he rose up the ranks he served as a tsukebito or personal attendant to Kitanoumi of the affiliated Mihogaseki stable, and the two eventually became close friends. He became a sekitori upon promotion to the juryo division in May 1976. He did not reach the top makuuchi division until November 1981, his 80th career tournament. He was ranked in the top division for only four tournaments, compiling a win-loss record of 26–34. His highest rank was maegashira 6, which he reached in November 1984. He retired in September 1987 at the age of 36 after being demoted to the unsalaried makushita division. He had never missed a bout in his entire career, fighting 1263 consecutive matches.

== Retirement from sumo ==
Hachiya was able to stay in sumo as an elder of the Japan Sumo Association because of his old friend Kitanoumi, who lent him his elder name of Onogawa (which he did not need himself as he had been made an ichidai or one-generation elder and was allowed to keep his fighting name after retirement). Hachiya worked as a coach at Kitanoumi stable until his death in January 2001 at the age of 50 from cancer of the upper jaw.

== Fighting style ==
At 1.80 m (5 ft 11 in) and 108 kg (238 lb) Hachiya was small for a sumo wrestler but he used power and skill to counteract his light weight, regularly carrying his opponents out of the dohyo by tsuri-dashi (lift out). He was particularly fond of ashi-waza, or techniques aimed at the opponent's legs, such as uchi-muso or "inner thigh propping twist down."

== Career record ==
Hachiya Toshiyuki
Year	January Hatsu basho, Tokyo	March Haru basho, Osaka	May Natsu basho, Tokyo	July Nagoya basho, Nagoya	September Aki basho, Tokyo	November Kyūshū basho, Fukuoka
1968	x	x	x	x	(Maezumo)	East Jonokuchi #8; 6–1
1969	East Jonidan #26; 3–4	East Jonidan #33; 3–4	East Jonidan #39; 6–1	East Sandanme #85; 3–4	East Sandanme #94; 4–3	West Sandanme #79; 4–3
1970	West Sandanme #63; 4–3	East Sandanme #47; 3–4	West Sandanme #53; 4–3	West Sandanme #32; 5–2	West Sandanme #10; 3–4	East Sandanme #21; 6–1
1971	East Makushita #49; 4–3	East Makushita #40; 2–5	East Makushita #60; 5–2	East Makushita #35; 3–4	West Makushita #41; 5–2	East Makushita #24; 3–4
1972	East Makushita #31; 4–3	West Makushita #26; 3–4	West Makushita #31; 5–2	West Makushita #18; 2–5	East Makushita #31; 4–3	East Makushita #29; 2–5
1973	West Makushita #50; 3–4	West Makushita #58; 4–3	East Makushita #52; 5–2	East Makushita #32; 3–4	East Makushita #42; 3–4	East Makushita #52; 6–1
1974	West Makushita #23; 6–1	East Makushita #8; 2–5	East Makushita #26; 6–1	West Makushita #7; 3–4	East Makushita #12; 4–3	West Makushita #10; 1–6
1975	East Makushita #37; 4–3	East Makushita #32; 2–5	East Makushita #52; 6–1	East Makushita #25; 4–3	West Makushita #19; 2–5	East Makushita #38; 5–2
1976	East Makushita #25; 4–3	West Makushita #19; 7–0; Champion	East Jūryō #12; 7–8	East Jūryō #13; 11–4; Champion	East Jūryō #2; 4–11	West Jūryō #7; 6–9
1977	West Jūryō #10; 7–8	West Jūryō #11; 8–7	East Jūryō #8; 8–7	East Jūryō #6; 8–7	West Jūryō #2; 3–12	East Jūryō #12; 8–7
1978	West Jūryō #9; 7–8	West Jūryō #13; 3–12	East Makushita #13; 4–3	East Makushita #7; 2–5	West Makushita #23; 5–2	West Makushita #10; 4–3
1979	West Makushita #7; 6–1	West Jūryō #12; 8–7	East Jūryō #10; 7–8	East Jūryō #10; 7–8	East Makushita #1; 3–4	East Makushita #7; 4–3
1980	East Makushita #4; 5–2	East Makushita #1; 4–3	East Jūryō #13; 8–7	East Jūryō #11; 8–7	West Jūryō #6; 5–10	West Jūryō #10; 8–7
1981	East Jūryō #7; 6–9	East Jūryō #11; 10–5	West Jūryō #3; 7–8	West Jūryō #3; 7–8	East Jūryō #5; 10–5	East Maegashira #13; 5–10
1982	East Jūryō #4; 6–9	West Jūryō #7; 7–8	West Jūryō #9; 7–8	West Jūryō #10; 9–6	East Jūryō #5; 7–8	West Jūryō #7; 7–8
1983	West Jūryō #9; 8–7	West Jūryō #8; 7–8	East Jūryō #9; 8–7	West Jūryō #6; 8–7	East Jūryō #5; 6–9	West Jūryō #8; 8–7
1984	West Jūryō #5; 6–9	West Jūryō #9; 11–4	West Jūryō #3; 7–8	East Jūryō #5; 10–5	East Maegashira #14; 10–5	West Maegashira #6; 6–9
1985	West Maegashira #11; 5–10	West Jūryō #2; 6–9	East Jūryō #6; 6–9	East Jūryō #9; 9–6	East Jūryō #6; 8–7	East Jūryō #4; 8–7
1986	West Jūryō #2; 6–9	East Jūryō #5; 7–8	West Jūryō #6; 6–9	East Jūryō #12; 9–6	East Jūryō #7; 7–8	East Jūryō #9; 8–7
1987	East Jūryō #6; 9–6	East Jūryō #2; 7–8	East Jūryō #5; 6–9	West Jūryō #9; 4–11	East Makushita #7; Retired; 0–0–7	x
Record given as wins–losses–absences Top division champion Top division runner-up Retired Lower divisions Non-participation Sanshō key: F=Fighting spirit; O=Outstanding performance; T=Technique Also shown: ★=Kinboshi; P=Playoff(s); Divisions: Makuuchi — Jūryō — Makushita — Sandanme — Jonidan — Jonokuchi Makuuchi ranks: Yokozuna — Ōzeki — Sekiwake — Komusubi — Maegashira

== See also ==
- Glossary of sumo terms
- List of past sumo wrestlers
- List of sumo tournament second division champions
