= Kaneshiro Kōfuku =

Japanese sumo wrestler (1953–2002)

Personal information
- Native name: 金城 興福
- Born: Kōfuku Kaneshiro; February 27, 1953 Takanabe, Miyazaki, Japan
- Died: December 29, 2002 (aged 49)
- Height: 1.84 m (6 ft 1/2 in)
- Weight: 140 kg (310 lb; 22 st)

Sport
- Sport: Sumo
- Retired: May, 1987
- Heya: Kasugano
- Record: 683-725-22
- Debut: September, 1969
- Highest rank: Sekiwake (July, 1977)
- Special Prizes: Fighting Spirit (3)
- Gold Stars: 2 (Wajima)
- Updated on Sep. 2012

Kaneshiro Kōfuku (February 27, 1953 - December 29, 2002) was a sumo wrestler from Takanabe, Miyazaki, Japan. He made his professional debut in September 1969, and reached the top division in September 1974.

His highest rank was sekiwake. He was a runner-up in two tournaments and earned two gold stars and three Fighting Spirit prizes. After retiring in 1987 he opened up a sumo-themed restaurant. He died of a heart attack in 2002.

== Career ==
Kaneshiro Kōfuku was born in 1953 and was active in judo and wrestling in high school. He was introduced to the head coach of Kasugano stable, the former Tochinishiki, by an employee of TBS broadcasting. He made his professional sumo debut in September 1969 (the same tournament as Hakuryuyama) and reached the jūryō division in March 1973. He reached the top makuuchi division in September 1974 at the age of 21, and won his first special prize for Fighting Spirit in March 1977. He reached his highest rank of sekiwake in July 1977 but held it for only one tournament.

He was ranked at komusubi on six occasions. After being runner-up in the January 1979 tournament and winning a second Fighting Spirit prize, he changed his shikona (fighting name) to Tochihikari, in honour of ōzeki Tochihikari Masayuki, who also fought for Kasugano stable. He hoped that he could also reach the ōzeki rank. He was runner-up for the second time in May 1980 and won a third Fighting Spirit prize.

He had earned two kinboshi awards by defeating Wajima in consecutive tournaments in November 1975 and January 1976, but was never able to defeat Kitanoumi, losing to him 29 straight times, which is a record for consecutive losses against the same opponent. He was also unable to beat Mienoumi, Wakanohana Kanji II, or Chiyonofuji when they were ranked at yokozuna, and his overall record was just two wins against yokozuna in 68 attempts. He never became a sanyaku rank wrestler.

He had a steady record against lower ranked wrestlers, few injuries, and was able to hold his own in makuuchi rank for ten years. In January 1985, he participated in his 60th and final top division tournament. After falling back to the jūryō division, he was no longer considered worthy of the prestigious "Tochihikari" name and so he reverted to "Kaneshiro", his birth name.

== Retirement from sumo ==
He retired in May 1987, to avoid falling to the makushita division. He left the sumo world upon retirement, as he had been unable to acquire elder stock in the Japan Sumo Association and remain as a coach. In addition to financial difficulty in securing the stock, the Sumo Association had also introduced a rule in 1976 requiring Japanese citizenship to become an elder, and Kaneshiro, because of his Korean parentage, was not eligible by birth and could not acquire citizenship until it was too late. He went into the restaurant business, opening a sumo themed restaurant named "Tochihikari" in Kasugai, Aichi and later opening branches in Osaka and Sendai, Miyagi. He died on December 29, 2002, at the age of 49, from a heart attack.

== Fighting style ==
Kaneshiro had a flexible body and low centre of gravity with weight around his hips, and specialized in the underarm throw (shitatenage) and leg kicks such as ketaguri. His most common winning kimarite were yorikiri (force out) and oshidashi (push out).

== Career record ==
Kaneshiro Kofuku
Year	January Hatsu basho, Tokyo	March Haru basho, Osaka	May Natsu basho, Tokyo	July Nagoya basho, Nagoya	September Aki basho, Tokyo	November Kyūshū basho, Fukuoka
1969	x	x	x	x	(Maezumo)	West Jonokuchi #2; 3–4
1970	East Jonidan #71; 5–2	East Jonidan #32; 4–3	West Jonidan #14; 4–3	East Sandanme #78; 2–5	East Jonidan #22; 4–3	West Jonidan #10; 5–2
1971	West Sandanme #52; 3–3–1	West Sandanme #62; 5–2	West Sandanme #35; 5–2	West Sandanme #10; 4–3	West Makushita #60; 4–3	East Makushita #52; 2–5
1972	East Sandanme #11; 4–3	East Sandanme #3; 6–1	East Makushita #34; 6–1–P	West Makushita #11; 4–3	East Makushita #9; 4–3	West Makushita #6; 5–2
1973	East Makushita #3; 6–1	East Jūryō #11; 7–8	East Jūryō #13; 8–7	East Jūryō #11; 7–8	West Jūryō #12; 10–5	West Jūryō #5; 7–2–6
1974	West Jūryō #6; 7–8	West Jūryō #7; 7–8	East Jūryō #3; 7–8	East Jūryō #6; 11–4	East Maegashira #12; 9–6	East Maegashira #8; 9–6
1975	East Maegashira #3; 5–10	West Maegashira #8; 8–7	East Maegashira #6; 6–9	East Maegashira #9; 8–7	East Maegashira #6; 9–6	West Maegashira #2; 9–6 ★
1976	East Maegashira #1; 8–7 ★	West Komusubi #1; 4–11	West Maegashira #5; 8–7	West Maegashira #2; 8–7	West Maegashira #1; 3–12	West Maegashira #8; 9–6
1977	East Maegashira #2; 5–10	East Maegashira #7; 11–4; F	East Komusubi #1; 8–7	West Sekiwake #1; 5–10	East Maegashira #3; 6–9	East Maegashira #6; 9–6
1978	East Maegashira #2; 8–7	West Komusubi #1; 3–12	East Maegashira #8; 8–7	West Maegashira #4; 6–9	East Maegashira #7; 10–5	East Maegashira #2; 5–10
1979	West Maegashira #7; 12–3; F	East Komusubi #1; 6–9	West Maegashira #1; 5–10	West Maegashira #5; 9–6	West Komusubi #1; 2–13	West Maegashira #7; 10–5
1980	East Maegashira #1; 5–10	West Maegashira #4; 5–10	West Maegashira #10; 12–3; F	West Komusubi #1; 5–10	East Maegashira #4; 6–9	East Maegashira #7; 6–9
1981	West Maegashira #11; 10–5	West Maegashira #2; 5–10	West Maegashira #5; 8–7	West Maegashira #2; 7–8	West Maegashira #3; 3–12	West Maegashira #9; 10–5
1982	East Maegashira #4; 6–9	East Maegashira #6; 9–6	East Maegashira #2; 4–11	West Maegashira #10; 9–6	West Maegashira #5; 6–9	West Maegashira #9; 7–8
1983	West Maegashira #10; 8–7	East Maegashira #6; 7–8	West Maegashira #6; 9–6	East Maegashira #1; 1–14	East Maegashira #12; 9–6	East Maegashira #4; 4–11
1984	East Maegashira #12; 9–6	East Maegashira #5; 5–10	East Maegashira #11; 4–11	West Jūryō #4; 8–7	West Jūryō #2; Sat out due to injury 0–0–15	West Jūryō #2; 9–6
1985	West Maegashira #13; 2–13	East Jūryō #8; 8–7	West Jūryō #5; 10–5	East Jūryō #2; 5–10	West Jūryō #7; 8–7	West Jūryō #4; 7–8
1986	East Jūryō #7; 9–6	East Jūryō #2; 5–10	East Jūryō #8; 8–7	East Jūryō #5; 8–7	West Jūryō #3; 3–12	East Jūryō #13; 8–7
1987	West Jūryō #11; 8–7	East Jūryō #9; 6–9	East Jūryō #12; Retired; 2–13	x	x	x
Record given as wins–losses–absences Top division champion Top division runner-up Retired Lower divisions Non-participation Sanshō key: F=Fighting spirit; O=Outstanding performance; T=Technique Also shown: ★=Kinboshi; P=Playoff(s); Divisions: Makuuchi — Jūryō — Makushita — Sandanme — Jonidan — Jonokuchi Makuuchi ranks: Yokozuna — Ōzeki — Sekiwake — Komusubi — Maegashira

== See also ==
- List of sumo tournament top division runners-up
- Glossary of sumo terms
- List of past sumo wrestlers
- List of sekiwake
