= 2006 in sumo =

The following are the events in professional sumo during 2006.

== Tournaments ==
=== Hatsu basho ===
Ryogoku Kokugikan, Tokyo, 8 January – 22 January

2006 Hatsu basho results - Makuuchi Division
W		L		A	East			Rank	West			W		L		A
11	-	4	-	0		(Mongolia)	**Asashōryū**	Y								
4	-	4	-	7	ø	(Japan)	Chiyotaikai	O	ø	(Japan)	Kaiō	3	-	6	-	6
14	-	1	-	0		(Japan)	**Tochiazuma**	O		(Bulgaria)	**Kotoōshū**	10	-	5	-	0
8	-	7	-	0		(Japan)	**Kotomitsuki**	S		(Mongolia)	**Hakuhō**	13	-	2	-	0
4	-	11	-	0		(Mongolia)	Kyokutenhō	K		(Japan)	Tamanoshima	7	-	8	-	0
8	-	7	-	0		(Japan)	**Miyabiyama**	M1		(Mongolia)	Tokitenkū	5	-	10	-	0
9	-	6	-	0		(Russia)	**Rohō**	M2		(Georgia (country))	**Kokkai**	8	-	7	-	0
4	-	11	-	0		(Japan)	Takekaze	M3		(Japan)	Tochinohana	4	-	11	-	0
4	-	11	-	0		(Russia)	Hakurozan	M4		(Mongolia)	Asasekiryū	5	-	10	-	0
8	-	7	-	0		(Japan)	**Iwakiyama**	M5		(Japan)	Kasuganishiki	4	-	11	-	0
9	-	6	-	0		(Mongolia)	**Ama**	M6		(Japan)	**Dejima**	8	-	7	-	0
9	-	6	-	0		(Japan)	**Aminishiki**	M7		(Japan)	**Kakizoe**	8	-	7	-	0
7	-	8	-	0		(Japan)	Jūmonji	M8		(Japan)	**Futen'ō**	9	-	6	-	0
8	-	7	-	0		(Japan)	**Kisenosato**	M9		(Japan)	Toyonoshima	7	-	8	-	0
7	-	8	-	0		(Japan)	Takamisakari	M10		(Japan)	**Kotoshōgiku**	8	-	7	-	0
12	-	3	-	0		(Japan)	**Hokutōriki**	M11		(Mongolia)	Kyokushūzan	7	-	8	-	0
9	-	6	-	0		(South Korea)	**Kasugaō**	M12		(Japan)	Toyozakura	7	-	8	-	0
4	-	10	-	1	ø	(Japan)	Tochisakae	M13		(Japan)	Yoshikaze	5	-	10	-	0
5	-	10	-	0		(Japan)	Tosanoumi	M14		(Japan)	**Tokitsuumi**	12	-	3	-	0
4	-	11	-	0		(Japan)	Shunketsu	M15		(Japan)	Wakatoba	4	-	11	-	0
10	-	5	-	0		(Japan)	**Wakanosato**	M16		(Japan)	Katayama	6	-	9	-	0
9	-	6	-	0		(Japan)	**Kitazakura**	M17								

ø - Indicates a pull-out or absent rank
**winning record in bold**
**Yusho Winner**

=== Haru basho ===
Osaka Prefectural Gymnasium, Osaka, 12 March – 26 March

2006 Haru basho results - Makuuchi Division
W		L		A	East		Rank	West			W		L		A
13	-	2	-	0	(Mongolia)	**Asashōryū***	Y	ø							
12	-	3	-	0	(Japan)	**Tochiazuma**	O		(Bulgaria)	**Kotoōshū**	9	-	6	-	0
9	-	6	-	0	(Japan)	**Chiyotaikai**	O		(Japan)	**Kaiō**	8	-	7	-	0
13	-	2	-	0	(Mongolia)	**Hakuhō**	S		(Japan)	**Kotomitsuki**	8	-	7	-	0
4	-	11	-	0	(Russia)	Rohō	K		(Japan)	**Miyabiyama**	10	-	5	-	0
5	-	10	-	0	(Japan)	Tamanoshima	M1		(Georgia (country))	Kokkai	5	-	10	-	0
8	-	7	-	0	(Mongolia)	**Ama**	M2		(Japan)	Hokutōriki	1	-	14	-	0
7	-	8	-	0	(Japan)	Aminishiki	M3		(Japan)	Iwakiyama	4	-	11	-	0
6	-	9	-	0	(Japan)	Futen'ō	M4		(Japan)	Dejima	6	-	9	-	0
11	-	4	-	0	(Mongolia)	**Kyokutenhō**	M5		(Japan)	Tokitsuumi	2	-	13	-	0
9	-	6	-	0	(Japan)	**Kakizoe**	M6		(Mongolia)	**Tokitenkū**	8	-	7	-	0
10	-	5	-	0	(Japan)	**Kisenosato**	M7		(South Korea)	Kasugaō	7	-	8	-	0
9	-	6	-	0	(Japan)	**Kotoshōgiku**	M8		(Mongolia)	**Asasekiryū**	10	-	5	-	0
4	-	11	-	0	(Japan)	Jūmonji	M9		(Japan)	**Takekaze**	9	-	6	-	0
7	-	8	-	0	(Japan)	Tochinohana	M10		(Japan)	Toyonoshima	6	-	9	-	0
11	-	4	-	0	(Japan)	**Wakanosato**	M11		(Japan)	Takamisakari	7	-	8	-	0
9	-	6	-	0	(Russia)	**Hakurozan**	M12		(Japan)	**Tochinonada**	8	-	7	-	0
11	-	4	-	0	(Mongolia)	**Kyokushūzan**	M13		(Japan)	Kasuganishiki	5	-	10	-	0
4	-	11	-	0	(Japan)	Toyozakura	M14		(Japan)	Kitazakura	7	-	8	-	0
9	-	6	-	0	(Japan)	**Tamakasuga**	M15		(Japan)	Ōtsukasa	4	-	11	-	0
4	-	11	-	0	(Japan)	Ushiomaru	M16		(Japan)	**Yoshikaze**	8	-	7	-	0
8	-	7	-	0	(Japan)	**Buyūzan**	M17	ø							

ø - Indicates a pull-out or absent rank
**winning record in bold**
**Yusho Winner**
***Won Playoff**

=== Natsu basho ===
Ryogoku Kokugikan, Tokyo, 7 May – 21 May

2006 Natsu basho results - Makuuchi Division
W		L		A	East			Rank	West			W		L		A
1	-	2	-	12	ø	(Mongolia)	Asashōryū	Y	ø							
2	-	5	-	8	ø	(Japan)	Tochiazuma	O		(Bulgaria)	**Kotoōshū**	8	-	7	-	0
10	-	5	-	0		(Japan)	**Chiyotaikai**	O		(Japan)	**Kaiō**	9	-	6	-	0
					ø			O		(Mongolia)	**Hakuhō***	14	-	1	-	0
8	-	7	-	0		(Japan)	**Kotomitsuki**	S		(Japan)	**Miyabiyama**	14	-	1	-	0
5	-	10	-	0		(Mongolia)	Kyokutenhō	K		(Mongolia)	Ama	4	-	11	-	0
8	-	7	-	0		(Japan)	**Kisenosato**	M1		(Japan)	Kakizoe	6	-	9	-	0
10	-	5	-	0		(Mongolia)	**Asasekiryū**	M2		(Japan)	Wakanosato	6	-	9	-	0
9	-	6	-	0		(Japan)	**Kotoshōgiku**	M3		(Japan)	Aminishiki	5	-	10	-	0
5	-	10	-	0		(Mongolia)	Tokitenkū	M4		(Japan)	Takekaze	2	-	13	-	0
9	-	6	-	0		(Mongolia)	**Kyokushūzan**	M5		(Russia)	**Rohō**	8	-	7	-	0
6	-	9	-	0		(Japan)	Tamanoshima	M6		(Georgia (country))	**Kokkai**	8	-	7	-	0
9	-	6	-	0		(Japan)	**Futen'ō**	M7		(Japan)	**Dejima**	8	-	7	-	0
6	-	9	-	0		(South Korea)	Kasugaō	M8		(Russia)	**Hakurozan**	10	-	5	-	0
7	-	8	-	0		(Japan)	Iwakiyama	M9		(Japan)	Tochinonada	6	-	9	-	0
6	-	9	-	0		(Japan)	Tamakasuga	M10		(Japan)	Tochinohana	5	-	10	-	0
6	-	9	-	0		(Japan)	Hōmashō	M11		(Estonia)	**Baruto**	11	-	4	-	0
8	-	7	-	0		(Japan)	**Takamisakari**	M12		(Japan)	**Tosanoumi**	8	-	7	-	0
8	-	7	-	0		(Japan)	**Toyonoshima**	M13		(Japan)	**Hokutōriki**	10	-	5	-	0
5	-	10	-	0		(Japan)	Katayama	M14		(Japan)	**Yoshikaze**	9	-	6	-	0
7	-	8	-	0		(Japan)	Buyūzan	M15		(Japan)	Kitazakura	7	-	8	-	0
2	-	9	-	4	ø	(Japan)	Tokitsuumi	M16		(Japan)	**Jūmonji**	8	-	7	-	0

ø - Indicates a pull-out or absent rank
**winning record in bold**
**Yusho Winner**
***Won Playoff**

=== Nagoya basho ===
Aichi Prefectural Gymnasium, Nagoya, 9 July – 23 July

2006 Nagoya basho results - Makuuchi Division
W		L		A	East			Rank	West		W		L		A
14	-	1	-	0		(Mongolia)	**Asashōryū**	Y							
13	-	2	-	0		(Mongolia)	**Hakuhō**	O	(Japan)	**Chiyotaikai**	9	-	6	-	0
9	-	6	-	0		(Japan)	**Kaiō**	O	(Bulgaria)	**Kotoōshū**	8	-	7	-	0
					ø			O	(Japan)	**Tochiazuma**	8	-	7	-	0
10	-	5	-	0		(Japan)	**Miyabiyama**	S	(Japan)	**Kotomitsuki**	8	-	7	-	0
1	-	2	-	12	ø	(Mongolia)	Asasekiryū	K	(Japan)	**Kisenosato**	8	-	7	-	0
3	-	12	-	0		(Japan)	Kotoshōgiku	M1	(Mongolia)	Kyokushūzan	3	-	12	-	0
2	-	13	-	0		(Russia)	Hakurozan	M2	(Mongolia)	Kyokutenhō	6	-	9	-	0
8	-	5	-	2		(Russia)	**Rohō**	M3	(Japan)	Kakizoe	4	-	11	-	0
6	-	9	-	0		(Mongolia)	Ama	M4	(Estonia)	**Baruto**	9	-	6	-	0
6	-	9	-	0		(Japan)	Futen'ō	M5	(Georgia (country))	**Kokkai**	10	-	5	-	0
3	-	2	-	10	ø	(Japan)	Wakanosato	M6	(Japan)	**Dejima**	8	-	7	-	0
4	-	11	-	0		(Japan)	Hokutōriki	M7	(Japan)	**Aminishiki**	8	-	7	-	0
10	-	5	-	0		(Mongolia)	**Tokitenkū**	M8	(Japan)	Takamisakari	7	-	8	-	0
6	-	9	-	0		(Japan)	Yoshikaze	M9	(Japan)	Tosanoumi	6	-	9	-	0
11	-	4	-	0		(Japan)	**Tamanoshima**	M10	(Japan)	**Iwakiyama**	9	-	6	-	0
9	-	6	-	0		(Japan)	**Toyonoshima**	M11	(South Korea)	Kasugaō	5	-	10	-	0
10	-	5	-	0		(Japan)	**Tochinonada**	M12	(Japan)	**Tamakasuga**	11	-	4	-	0
8	-	7	-	0		(Japan)	**Jūmonji**	M13	(Japan)	**Takekaze**	9	-	6	-	0
9	-	6	-	0		(Japan)	**Hōmashō**	M14	(Japan)	Toyozakura	5	-	10	-	0
8	-	7	-	0		(Japan)	**Tochinohana**	M15	(Japan)	Buyūzan	4	-	11	-	0
5	-	10	-	0		(Japan)	Kitazakura	M16	(Japan)	Daimanazuru	2	-	13	-	0

ø - Indicates a pull-out or absent rank
**winning record in bold**
**Yusho Winner**

=== Aki basho ===
Ryogoku Kokugikan, Tokyo, 10 September – 24 September

2006 Aki basho results - Makuuchi Division
W		L		A	East			Rank	West			W		L		A
13	-	2	-	0		(Mongolia)	**Asashōryū**	Y	ø							
8	-	7	-	0		(Mongolia)	**Hakuhō**	O		(Japan)	**Chiyotaikai**	10	-	5	-	0
1	-	6	-	8	ø	(Japan)	Kaiō	O		(Bulgaria)	**Kotoōshū**	10	-	5	-	0
					ø			O		(Japan)	**Tochiazuma**	9	-	6	-	0
9	-	6	-	0		(Japan)	**Miyabiyama**	S		(Japan)	**Kotomitsuki**	8	-	7	-	0
8	-	7	-	0		(Japan)	**Kisenosato**	K		(Georgia (country))	**Kokkai**	8	-	7	-	0
4	-	7	-	4	ø	(Estonia)	Baruto	M1		(Russia)	**Rohō**	10	-	5	-	0
4	-	1	-	0		(Japan)	Tamanoshima	M2		(Mongolia)	Tokitenkū	7	-	8	-	0
7	-	8	-	0		(Japan)	Dejima	M3		(Japan)	**Aminishiki**	11	-	4	-	0
1	-	14	-	0		(Japan)	Tamakasuga	M4		(Mongolia)	Kyokutenhō	6	-	9	-	0
7	-	8	-	0		(Japan)	Tochinonada	M5		(Japan)	**Iwakiyama**	10	-	5	-	0
11	-	4	-	0		(Mongolia)	**Ama**	M6		(Japan)	Toyonoshima	4	-	1	-	0
9	-	6	-	0		(Japan)	**Futen'ō**	M7		(Japan)	**Kotoshōgiku**	10	-	5	-	0
6	-	9	-	0		(Mongolia)	Kyokushūzan	M8		(Japan)	**Kakizoe**	9	-	6	-	0
7	-	8	-	0		(Japan)	Takamisakari	M9		(Mongolia)	**Asasekiryū**	7	-	8	-	0
10	-	5	-	0		(Japan)	**Takekaze**	M10		(Russia)	Hakurozan	5	-	10	-	0
7	-	8	-	0		(Japan)	Hōmashō	M11		(Japan)	Jūmonji	4	-	11	-	0
5	-	10	-	0		(Japan)	Yoshikaze	M12		(Japan)	Tosanoumi	7	-	8	-	0
10	-	5	-	0		(Japan)	**Hokutōriki**	M13		(Japan)	Tochinohana	7	-	8	-	0
0	-	0	-	15	ø	(Japan)	Wakanosato	M14		(Japan)	Hōchiyama	5	-	10	-	0
6	-	9	-	0		(Japan)	Kasuganishiki	M15		(South Korea)	**Kasugaō**	8	-	7	-	0
4	-	11	-	0		(Japan)	Ryūhō	M16		(Japan)	Shimotori	7	-	8	-	0

ø - Indicates a pull-out or absent rank
**winning record in bold**
**Yusho Winner**

=== Kyushu basho ===
Fukuoka International Centre, Kyushu, 12 November – 26 November

2006 Kyushu basho results - Makuuchi Division
W		L		A	East			Rank	West			W		L		A
15	-	0	-	0		(Mongolia)	**Asashōryū**	Y	ø							
9	-	6	-	0		(Japan)	**Chiyotaikai**	O		(Bulgaria)	**Kotoōshū**	10	-	5	-	0
10	-	5	-	0		(Japan)	**Tochiazuma**	O	ø	(Mongolia)	Hakuhō	0	-	0	-	15
					ø			O		(Japan)	**Kaiō**	10	-	5	-	0
8	-	7	-	0		(Japan)	**Miyabiyama**	S		(Japan)	**Kotomitsuki**	9	-	6	-	0
8	-	7	-	0		(Japan)	**Kisenosato**	K		(Georgia (country))	Kokkai	3	-	12	-	0
6	-	9	-	0		(Japan)	Aminishiki	K		(Russia)	**Rohō**	8	-	7	-	0
6	-	9	-	0		(Mongolia)	Ama	M1		(Japan)	Iwakiyama	2	-	13	-	0
10	-	5	-	0		(Japan)	**Kotoshōgiku**	M2		(Japan)	Futen'ō	5	-	10	-	0
9	-	6	-	0		(Mongolia)	**Tokitenkū**	M3		(Japan)	**Dejima**	10	-	5	-	0
6	-	9	-	0		(Japan)	Takekaze	M4		(Japan)	Kakizoe	6	-	9	-	0
0	-	9	-	6	ø	(Japan)	Hokutōriki	M5		(Japan)	Tochinonada	7	-	8	-	0
10	-	5	-	0		(Mongolia)	**Kyokutenhō**	M6		(Estonia)	**Baruto**	10	-	5	-	0
2	-	9	-	4	ø	(Japan)	Tamanoshima	M7		(South Korea)	**Kasugaō**	8	-	7	-	0
5	-	10	-	0		(Japan)	Toyozakura	M8		(Mongolia)	**Kakuryū**	8	-	7	-	0
10	-	5	-	0		(Japan)	**Takamisakari**	M9		(Mongolia)	**Asasekiryū**	10	-	5	-	0
0	-	2	-	0	ø	(Mongolia)	Kyokushūzan	M10		(Japan)	**Toyonoshima**	8	-	7	-	0
12	-	3	-	0		(Japan)	**Hōmashō**	M11		(Japan)	Kitazakura	4	-	11	-	0
5	-	10	-	0		(Japan)	Ushiomaru	M12		(Japan)	Tosanoumi	5	-	10	-	0
6	-	9	-	0		(Japan)	Asōfuji	M13		(Japan)	**Tochinohana**	8	-	7	-	0
9	-	6	-	0		(Japan)	**Tamakasuga**	M14		(Russia)	Hakurozan	7	-	8	-	0
7	-	8	-	0		(Japan)	Ōtsukasa	M15		(Japan)	Katayama	6	-	9	-	0

ø - Indicates a pull-out or absent rank
**winning record in bold**
**Yusho Winner**

== News ==
=== January ===
- At the Hatsu basho in Tokyo, ozeki Tochiazuma takes his third top division yusho or championship with a 14–1 record. This stops Asashoryu's record streak of consecutive championships at seven. Tochiazuma will likely be promoted to yokozuna if he wins the next tournament or posts at least 13 wins. Sekiwake Hakuho is runner-up with a 13–2 record and wins the Outstanding Performance Award. Ozeki Kaio and Chiyotaikai both drop out through injury. Maegashira Tokitsuumi and Hokutoriki both win an impressive twelve bouts; Tokitsuumi is awarded his fourth Technique Prize while Hokutoriki gets the Fighting Spirit Award. Veteran Tochinonada wins the juryo division championship with a 12–3 record and earns promotion back to the top makuuchi division. Estonian Baruto, recovered from appendicitis, wins the makushita division championship and returns to juryo. Former sekiwake Hayateumi, who has fallen to makushita 49, retires.

=== March ===
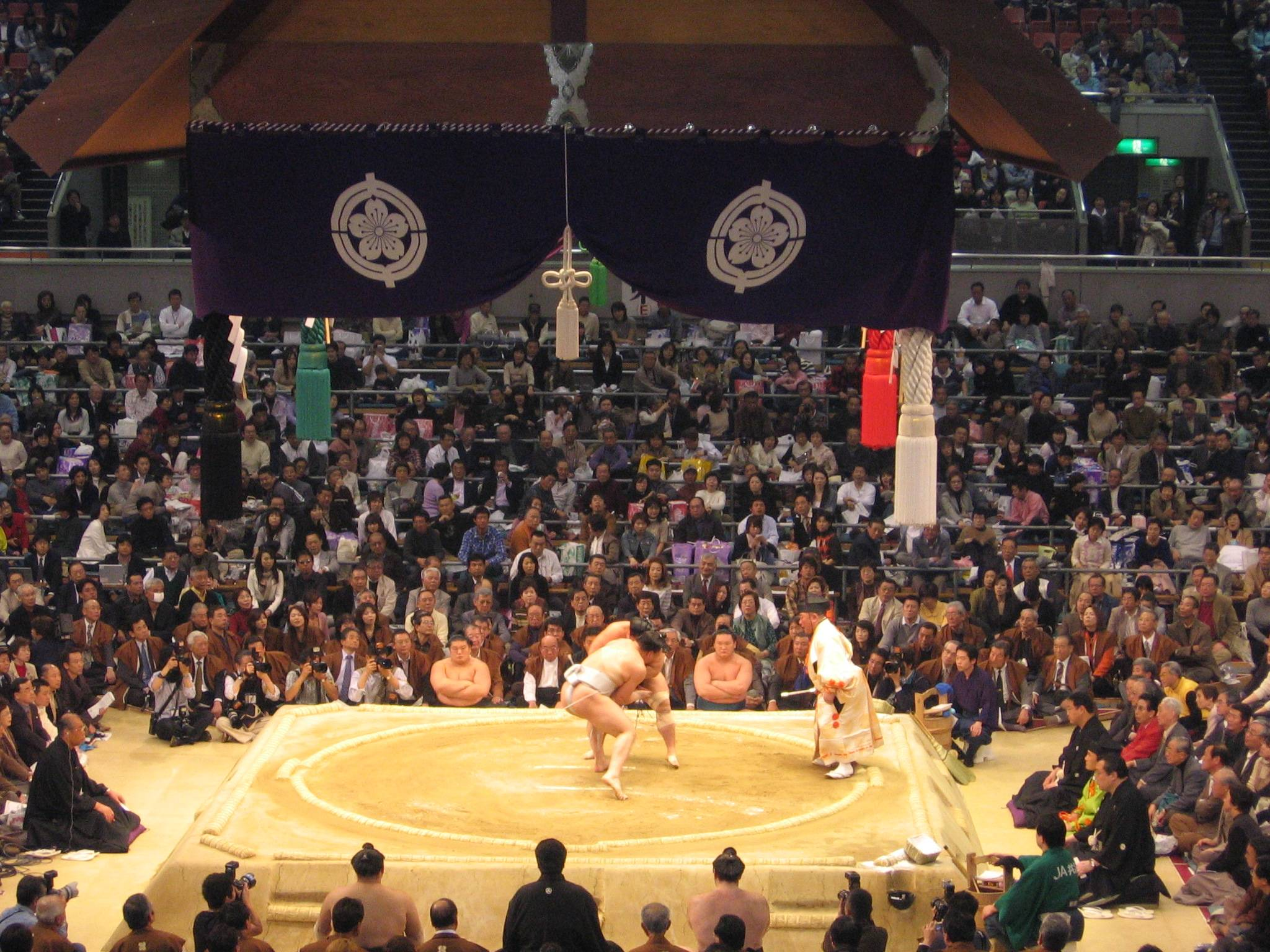
Action at the Osaka Prefectural Gym during the 2006 tournament.

- At the Haru basho in Osaka, Asashoryu defeats Hakuho in a playoff bout to take his 16th championship with a 13–2 score. Hakuho is promoted to ozeki nevertheless, and is awarded the Technique and Outstanding Performance prizes. He becomes the sixth non Japanese to reach sumo's second highest rank, and is also the fourth youngest ozeki ever. Fellow Mongolians Ama and Kyokushuzan win the Technique and Fighting Spirit prizes respectively. Tochiazauma, who was hoping for promotion to yokozuna, finishes in third place on 12–3 and narrowly misses out. Kaio and Chiyotaikai both post winning records to maintain their ozeki status. In the juryo division Baruto wins the championship with a perfect 15–0 record, the first man to do so since Kitanofuji in 1963. He is promoted to the top division for the first time, alongside Homasho.

=== May ===
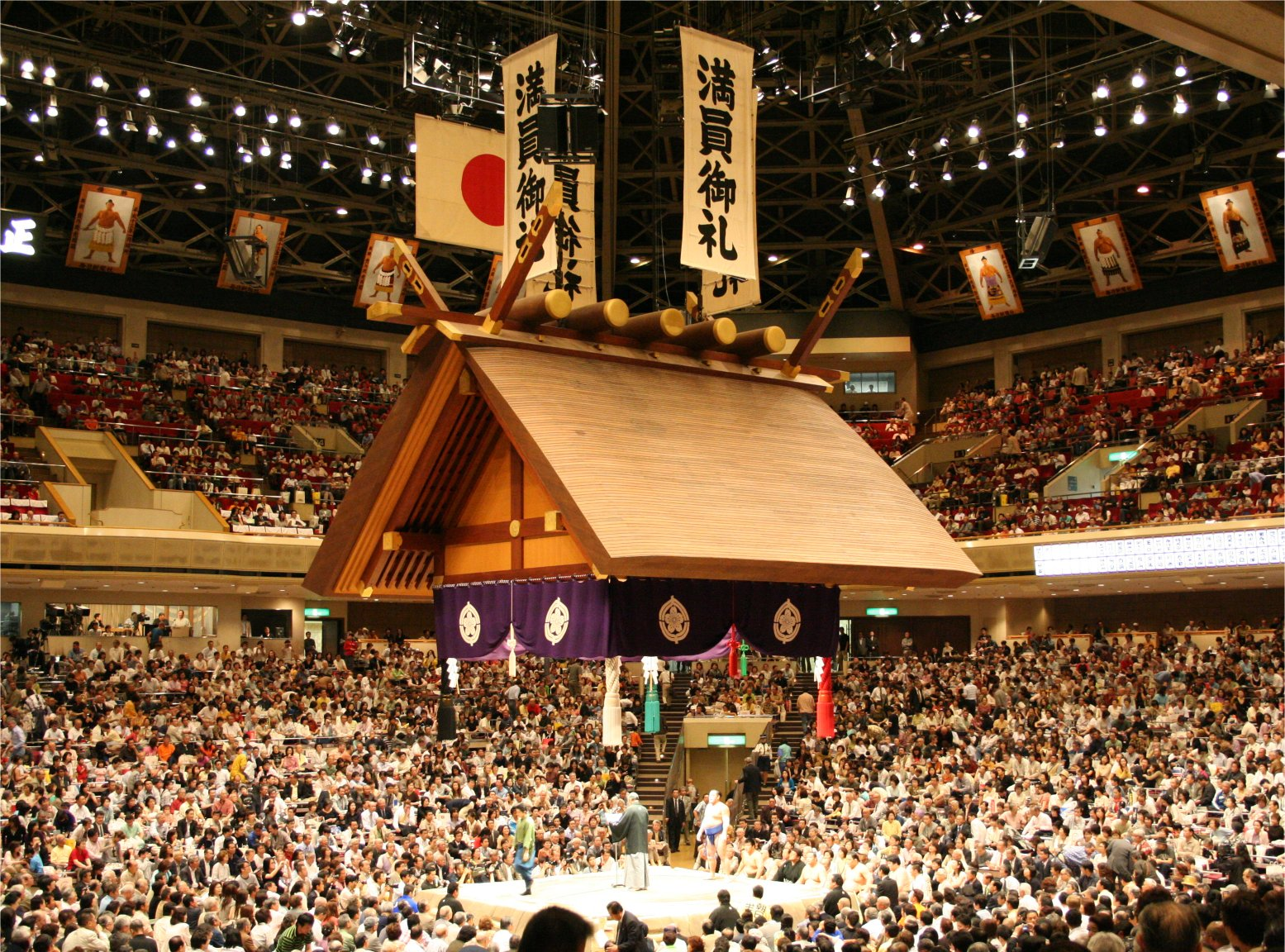
A full house at the Kokugikan on the final day of the May 2006 tournament.

- At the Natsu basho in Tokyo, Asashoryu bows out of the tournament early due to injury. Tochiazuma also withdraws after seven days. Hakuho takes his first championship in his debut tournament as an ozeki, with a 14–1 record. He defeats sekiwake Miyabiyama in a playoff. Miyabiyama's 14–1 score is his best ever, and there is speculation he could return to ozeki for the first time in five years with a good performance in July. He is awarded the Technique and Outstanding Performance prizes. Baruto scores eleven wins in his top division debut and wins the Fighting Spirit prize, as does Asasekiryu for his ten wins at maegashira 2. Toyozakura wins his first juryo championship and is promoted back to makuuchi. Daimanazuru is also promoted to the top division, in his case for the first time after 14 years in sumo. In makushita, the championship goes to Shimoda, a Nihon University graduate who scores a perfect 7–0 record as a makushita tsukedashi debutant. Former komusubi Toki retires.

=== June ===
- Following the death of its stablemaster, Hatachiyama stable is absorbed by the Kitanoumi stable.
- Oshiogawa Oyakata, the former ozeki Daikirin, retires from the Sumo Association at the age of 64.

=== July ===
- After bowing out of the Natsu basho due to injury, Asashoryu comes back strong to win his 17th yusho with a 14–1 record. Hakuho defeats Asashoryu on the final day but the championship had already been decided on Day 14 and his runner-up score of 13–2 is not considered good enough by the Sumo Association for promotion to yokozuna. Miyabiyama, who scored 10–5, is also denied promotion to ozeki, despite accumulating 34 wins over three tournaments. Tochiazuma races to an 8–0 lead, only to lose seven in a row. Veteran Tamakasuga is awarded the Technique Prize, some nine years after his previous special prize. Tamanoshima wins the Fighting Spirit Prize. Russian wrestler Roho is suspended for three days after striking two photographers and breaking a bathroom window following a bad-tempered defeat to Chiyotaikai. Hochiyama wins the juryo division championship. In the makushita division, Kageyama wins promotion to juryo after a 6–1 performance, and changes his fighting name to Tochiozan. Former maegashira Wakatsutomu retires.

=== August ===
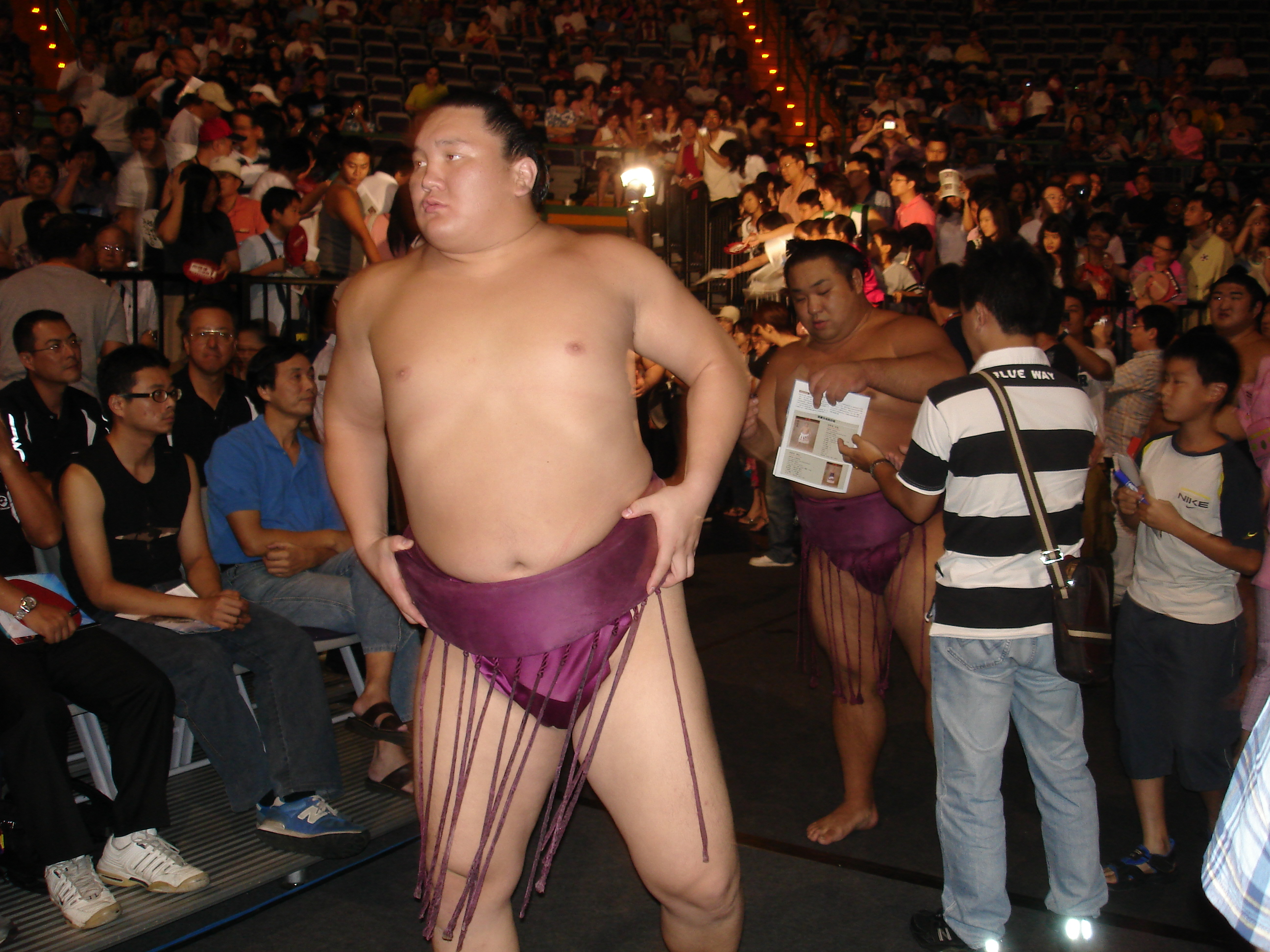
Hakuhō and Chiyotaikai in Taiwan.

- 1: Onoe Oyakata, the former komusubi Hamanoshima, leaves Mihogaseki stable to set up his own Onoe stable. He brings with him several sekitori, including Baruto.
- 20–21: The Sumo Association visits Taiwan for the first time. The 42 sekitori take part in a two-day tournament, won by Asashoryu.

=== September ===
- At the Aki basho in Tokyo, Asashoryu's dominance continues as he chalks up thirteen wins for his 18th championship. Hakuho and Miyabiyama's promotion hopes end as they score only 8–7 and 9–6 respectively. Runners-up are maegashira Aminishiki who is awarded the Technique Prize, and Ama who gets the Fighting Spirit Award. Komusubi Kisenosato is awarded his first Outstanding Performance prize for his victory over Asashoryu. Kaio withdraws on the seventh day of the tournament with only one win. In the juryo division, former sekiwake Takanowaka wins the yusho. The makushita championship goes to Sawai, who wins with a perfect 7–0 record. He is rewarded with promotion to the elite sekitori ranks and a shikona change to Goeido. Former amateur champion Kaido, a stablemate of Kaio, retires. In addition, the 40-year-old former juryo wrestler Kotokanyu, veteran of 154 tournaments, is forced to retire by his stablemaster after punching young opponent Ikioi in the face in the locker room after a defeat.
- The Sumo Association raises the standard of qualification for former wrestlers who wish to open up their own stables. They must now have spent at least 25 tournaments at a sanyaku rank or at least 60 tournaments ranked in the top division. The move is seen as an attempt to limit the number of stables, which now stands at 54.

=== November ===
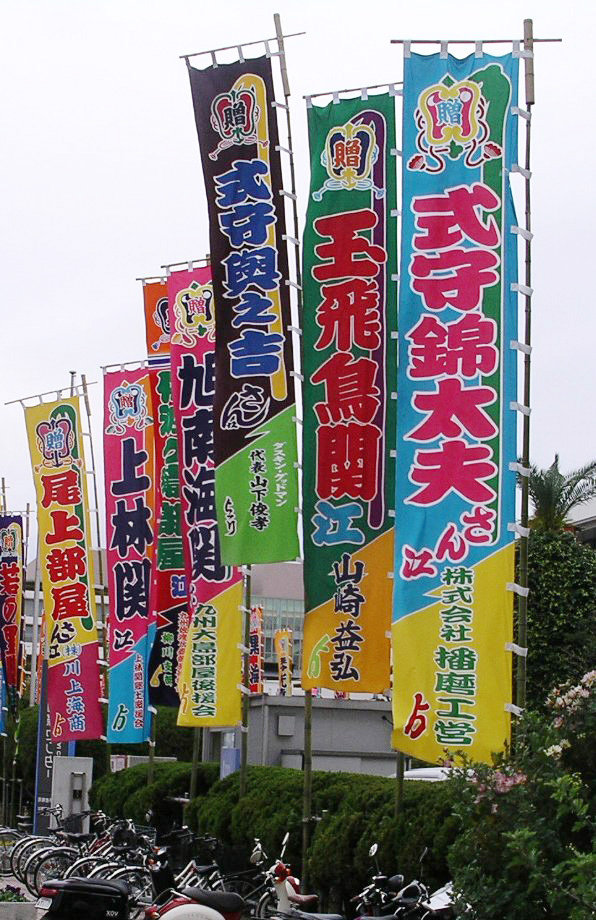
Banners announce the beginning of the 2006 Kyushu tournament.

- At the Kyushu basho, Asashoryu achieves a perfect 15–0 record to take his 19th championship. He has little competition; the closest being maegashira 11 Homasho, who finishes as runner-up on 12–3 and receives the Technique and Fighting Spirit Awards. Hakuho is missing, having injured himself in training shortly before the start of the tournament. Kotoshogiku shares the Technique Prize, scoring an impressive ten wins at maegashira 2. Kaio staves off retirement for another year by returning to win his first eight bouts in a row, although in the end he too finishes on 10–5. Jumonji wins the juryo championship. Former komusubi Kyokushuzan, who in 1996 was the first Mongolian to reach the top division, retires at the age of 33. He had been ranked as a maegashira for a record 58 consecutive tournaments. Former maegashira Harunoyama also announces his retirement. This tournament is also unique in sumo history in that there are three sets of brothers (Asofuji and Aminishiki, Kitazakura and Toyozakura, and Rohō and Hakurozan) in the top division simultaneously for the first and only time (Kitazakura is demoted back to juryo for January 2007).
- Isegahama Oyataka, the former ozeki Kiyokuni, reaches 65 and retires. Wakafuji Oyataka, the former Katsuhikari, takes over the running of Isegahama stable, but only on a short-term basis.

== Deaths ==
- 4 Feb: Former maegashira 1 Futatsuryu Tokuyoshi, aged 75.
- 25 Apr: Former maegashira 2 Kiyoenami Kazutsuna, aged 82.
- 29 May: The former sekiwake Tsurugamine, who as the head of Izutsu stable led his sons Sakahoko and Terao to the top division, dies of sepsis aged 77.
- 23 June: The former ozeki Hokutenyu, head coach of the Hatachiyama stable, dies of cancer of the kidney aged 45.
- 7 October: Former maegashira 2 Shishihō Yoshimasa, aged 51.
- 16 December: Former sekiwake Oginohana Masaaki, father of Oginohana Akikazu and Oginishiki, aged 71.

== See also ==
- Basho
- Glossary of sumo terms
- List of active sumo wrestlers
- List of past sumo wrestlers
- List of years in sumo
- List of yokozuna
