= Kasugano stable =

Sumo school in Ryōgoku, Tokyo, Japan

Coordinates: 35.6929°N 139.7908°E

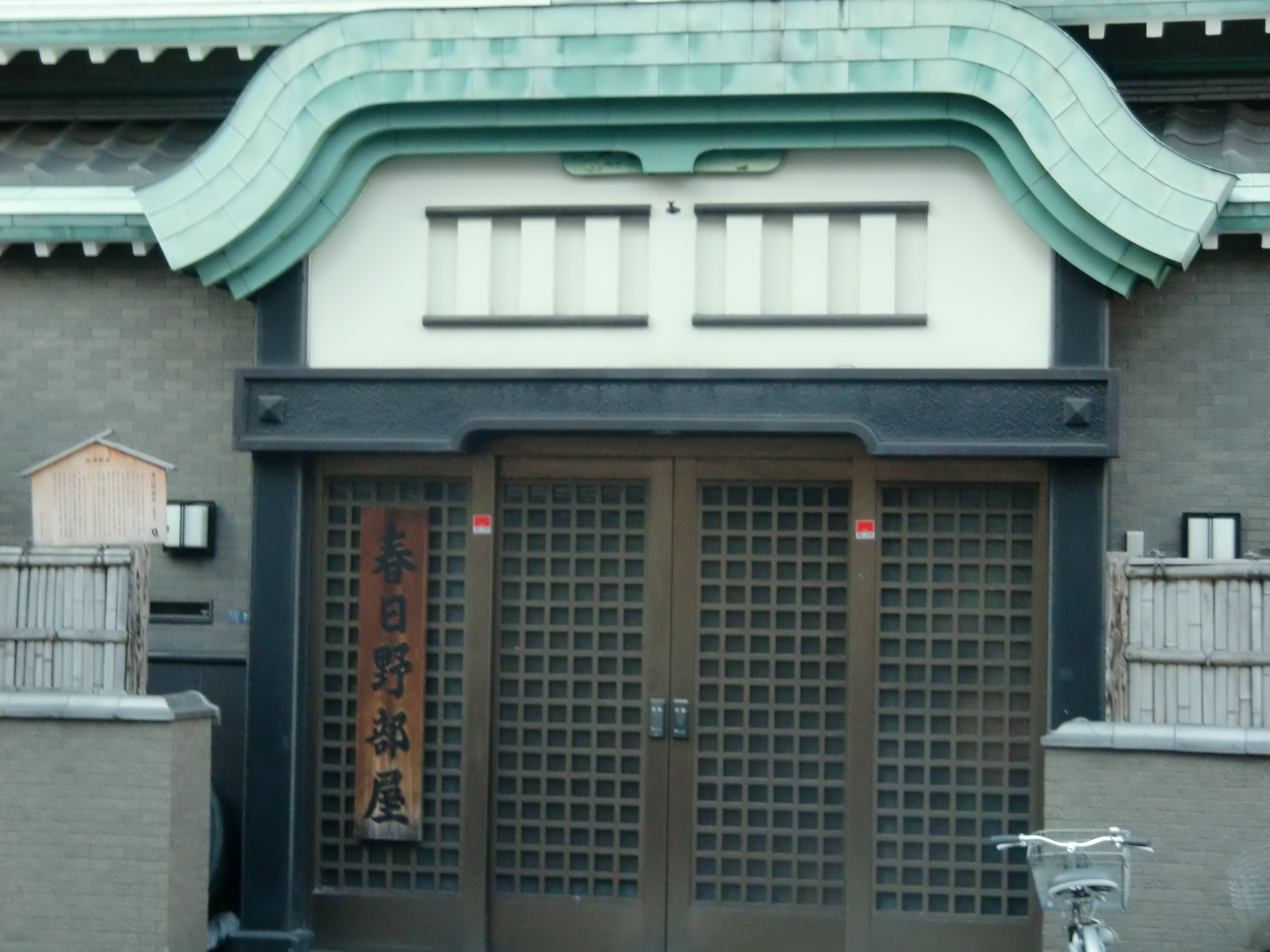
Entrance to Kasugano stable

Kasugano stable (春日野部屋, Kasugano-beya) is a stable of sumo wrestlers, part of the Dewanoumi ichimon or group of stables. As of January 2023 it had 17 wrestlers. It has been led by former sekiwake Tochinowaka Kiyotaka since 2003. It was one of the most successful stables in 2013, with six sekitori wrestlers, including now retired Georgian Tochinoshin and Japanese born (but Korean national) Tochinowaka Michihiro, who used the current head coach's old ring name.

It was founded in the mid 18th century by a wrestler named Kasugano Gunpachi. It became inactive for a long time but was led in the Meiji period by a referee named Kimura Soshiro (this is no longer allowed as oyakata must now be former wrestlers). He adopted as his son the 27th yokozuna Tochigiyama, who led the stable for over thirty years. He in turn adopted as his son the 44th yokozuna Tochinishiki, who became the head in 1959 whilst still an active wrestler and later served as the chairman of the Japan Sumo Association. Tochinoumi took over upon Tochinishiki's death in 1990 and led the stable until his retirement in 2003. Since Tochinishiki's death, the stable's wrestlers have made it a tradition to visit his grave every New Year. The stable absorbed Mihogaseki stable in 2013 when its stablemaster (ōzeki Masuiyama Daishirō II) reached the mandatory retirement age.

Kasugano was warned by the Sumo Association in 2011 after he beat three of his charges with a golf club for breaking a curfew. In a separate case, a junior wrestler was convicted in 2014 of an assault on another wrestler and given a three year jail sentence, suspended for four years. In March 2017 the victim sued Kasugano and the now retired assailant, saying he was still suffering from the effects of the broken jaw he received and that Kasugano failed to exercise appropriate oversight.

The stable is known for having bred a series of great wrestlers. Kasugano stable has always had at least one makuuchi wrestler between 1967 and November 2023, when Aoiyama was relegated to the second-highest jūryō division. When Aoiyama retired following the September 2024 tournament it was announced that makushita wrestler Tochitaikai would return to jūryō, continuing Kasugano stable's streak of having at least one sekitori wrestler (ranked at jūryō or higher) at every sumo tournament since the summer of 1935. Tochitaikai was elevated to makuuchi for the May 2025 tournament, marking the first promotion to the top division for the stable since Tochinowaka Michihiro was promoted in 2011. The stable's 91-year streak of having a sekitori-ranked wrestler was broken in March 2026.

On 29 April 2025 Kasugano stable held a celebration to commemorate 100 years since its founding, dating back to when the 27th yokozuna Tochigiyama took over the stable in 1925.

As of May 2026, the stable has 16 active wrestlers.

== Ring name conventions ==
Many wrestlers at this stable take ring names or shikona that begin with the character 栃 (read: tochi), in deference to the long line of owners who have used this character in their shikona. It originally referred to Tochigi Prefecture, where Tochigiyama came from, but subsequent owners were not from there and the prefix no longer has a geographical meaning.

== Owners ==
- 2003–present: 11th Kasugano Kiyotaka (yakuin taigū iin, sekiwake Tochinowaka)
- 1990–2003: 10th Kasugano Terumasa (the 49th yokozuna Tochinoumi)
- 1959–1990: 9th Kasugano Kiyotaka (the 44th yokozuna Tochinishiki)
- 1925–1959: 8th Kasugano Takeya (the 27th yokozuna Tochigiyama)

== Coaches ==
- Takenawa Taiichi (iin, sekiwake Tochinonada)
- Kiyomigata Yuichiro (iin, sekiwake Tochiōzan)
- Iwatomo Kōsuke (toshiyori, sekiwake Aoiyama)
- Fujigane Masaharu (iin, komusubi Daizen)
- Hatachiyama Hitoshi (iin, komusubi Tochinohana)
- Mihogaseki Atsushi (iin, maegashira Tochisakae)

== Assistants ==
- Tochigenō (sewanin, makushita, real name Yasuyuki Shigeto)
- Tochinofuji (wakaimonogashira, maegashira, real name Tatsuyuki Kusano)
- Torafusuyama (wakaimonogashira, makushita, real name Tomoyuki Tamaru)

== Notable active wrestlers ==
- Tochitaikai (best rank maegashira)
- Tochimaru (best rank jūryō)
- Tochimusashi (best rank jūryō)

== Notable former members ==
- Tochinishiki (the 44th yokozuna)
- Tochinoumi (the 49th yokozuna)
- Tochihikari (former ōzeki)
- Tochinoshin (former ōzeki)
- Kaneshiro (former sekiwake)
- Masudayama (former sekiwake)
- Tochiakagi (former sekiwake)
- Tochiazuma (former sekiwake)
- Tochiōzan (former sekiwake)
- Tochitsukasa (former sekiwake)
- Aoiyama (former sekiwake)
- Tochinowaka (former maegashira)
- Kasuganishiki (former maegashira)
- Kimurayama (former maegashira)

== Referees ==
- 40th Kimura Shōnosuke (tate-gyōji, real name Yoshimitsu Morita)
- Kimura Akijiro (makuuchi gyōji, real name Shigehiro Nakazawa)
- Kimura Zennosuke (juryo gyōji, real name Makoto Kimura)

== Hairdressers ==
- Tokotakumi (third class tokoyama)

== Location and access ==
Tokyo, Sumida Ward, Ryōgoku 1-7-11
7 minute walk from Ryōgoku Station on the Sōbu Line

== See also ==
- List of sumo stables
- List of active sumo wrestlers
- List of past sumo wrestlers
- Glossary of sumo terms
