= Tochinonada Taiichi =

Japanese sumo wrestler

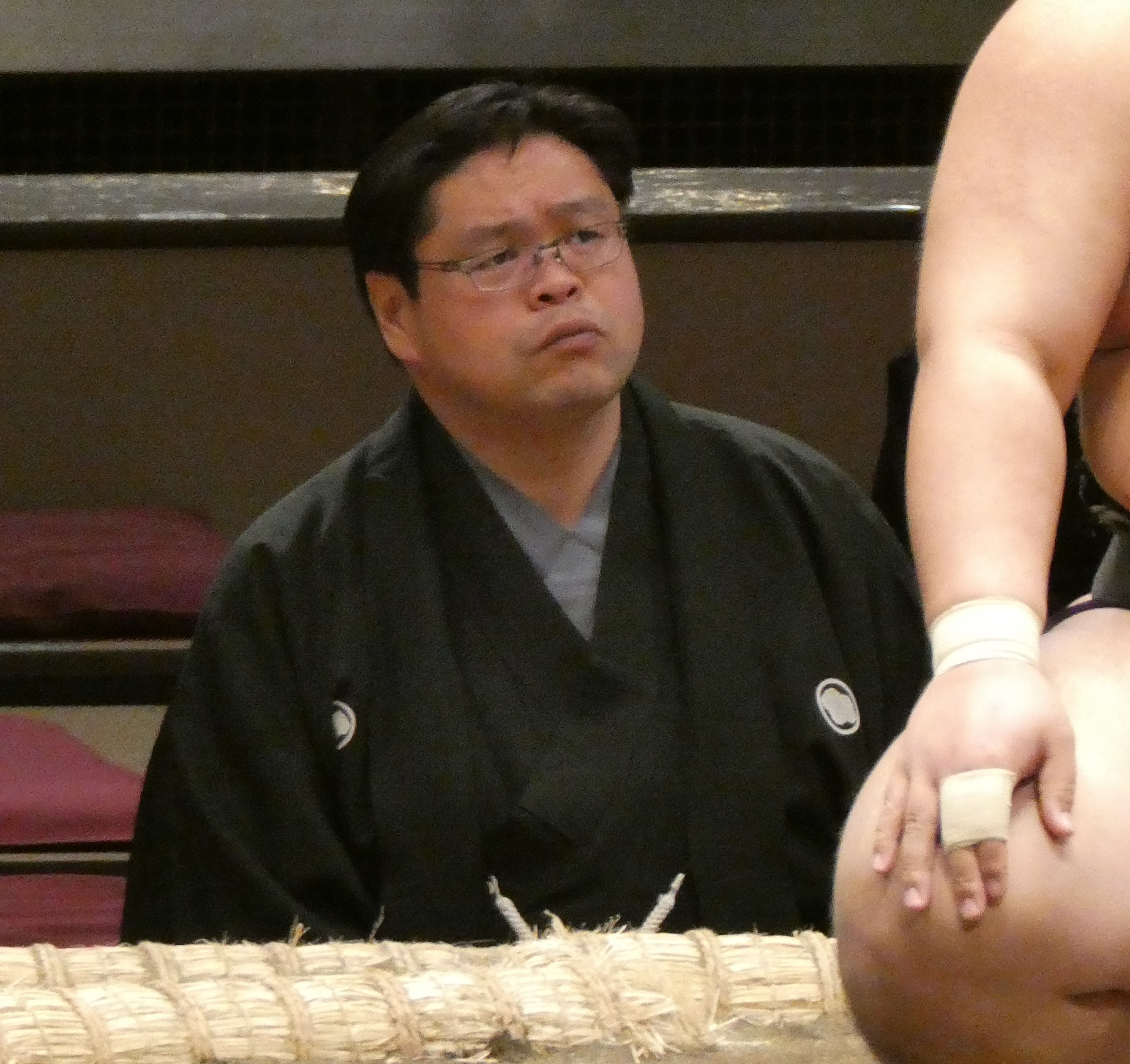

Personal information
- Native name: 栃乃洋 泰一
- Born: Taiichi Gotō; February 26, 1974 (age 52) Ishikawa, Japan
- Height: 1.87 m (6 ft 1 1/2 in)
- Weight: 162 kg (357 lb; 25.5 st)

Sport
- Sport: Sumo
- University team: Takushoku University
- Retired: January, 2012
- Heya: Kasugano
- Record: 669–700–31
- Debut: January 1996
- Highest rank: Sekiwake (March 2001)
- Elder name: Takenawa
- Championships: 2 (Jūryō)
- Special Prizes: Outstanding Performance (3); Fighting Spirit (2); Technique (1)
- Gold Stars: 12; Akebono (3); Wakanohana III (3); Musashimaru (3); Asashōryū (3)
- Updated on Jan 2012

Tochinonada Taiichi (栃乃洋 泰一 born February 26, 1974, as Taiichi Gotō) is a former sumo wrestler from Ishikawa Prefecture, Japan. An amateur sumo champion, he turned professional in 1996 and reached the top makuuchi division in 1997. He earned twelve kinboshi or gold stars for defeating yokozuna, the second highest ever, and he was a runner-up in two tournaments. His highest rank was sekiwake. He is now a coach at Kasugano stable under the name Takenawa Oyakata.

== Career ==
Born in Nanao, he was a rival of fellow top division wrestler Dejima in elementary school. He was an amateur sumo champion at Takushoku University, winning the College Yokozuna title. He joined Kasugano stable through a connection to Chigonoura Oyakata (the former sekiwake Masudayama), who was a fellow Takushoku University alumni and a coach at the stable, and made his professional debut in January 1996. Because of his amateur achievements he had makushita tsukedashi status, and so his debut tournament was in the third highest makushita division. In July he found himself in a rare nine-way playoff for the championship, but failed to win in the final bout. He made the jūryō division in November 1996, switching from his family name of Gotō and adopting the shikona of Tochinonada. He was promoted to the top makuuchi division three tournaments later in May 1997.

Tochinonada had a strong start to his makuuchi career, earning special prizes for Fighting Spirit in consecutive tournaments in July and September 1997. He made his titled san'yaku debut that November at the rank of komusubi. However he could manage only six wins there and did not return to the san'yaku ranks until January 2001, when he made komusubi once again. He reached his highest rank of sekiwake in March 2001 and held it for two tournaments. He was runner-up in the January 2003 tournament, when he lost his first four matches but then rallied to win eleven in a row to finish three wins behind Asashōryū. He was also runner-up to Kaiō in September 2004, where he also scored 11–4.

In March 1999 he became the first wrestler ever to win by default two days in a row. On Day 10 yokozuna Wakanohana withdrew, followed the next day by his brother Takanohana. However he did not receive a kinboshi for these victories. In May 1999 he injured ligaments in his left elbow in a match against Kaiō and had to sit out the following tournament in July. He did not miss any more bouts until six years later in July 2005 when he injured his right thigh on the second day and missed the rest of the tournament.

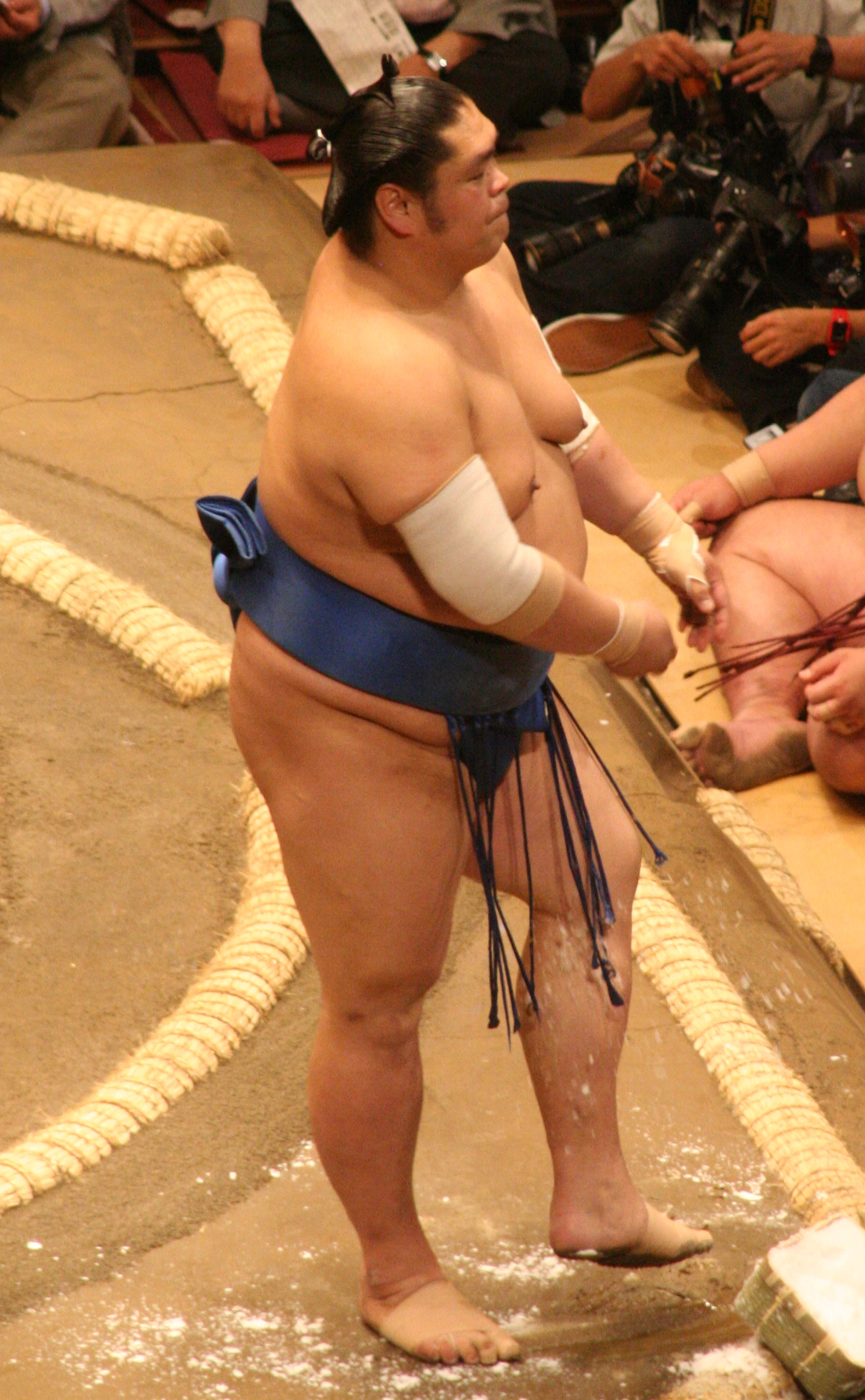
Tochinonada during the pre-bout warm up in May 2009.

During his long stay in the top division Tochinonada earned twelve kinboshi or gold stars for defeating yokozuna while ranked as a maegashira, which places him equal second on the all-time list, level with Takamiyama and behind only Akinoshima. His first kinboshi came in January 1998 when he defeated Akebono, and he earned his next three in three successive tournaments from May to September 1998. In November 2003 he defeated two yokozuna on two successive days, and was awarded the Outstanding Performance prize as well. He defeated all the yokozuna he met at least once, with the exception of Hakuhō (his victory over Takanohana was at sekiwake rank, meaning he was not eligible for a gold star on that occasion). His twelfth and final kinboshi came nearly four years after his previous one, in July 2008 against Asashōryū. Although Tochinonada touched the ground first, Asashōryū had already gone out of the ring, and was therefore shini-tai. '

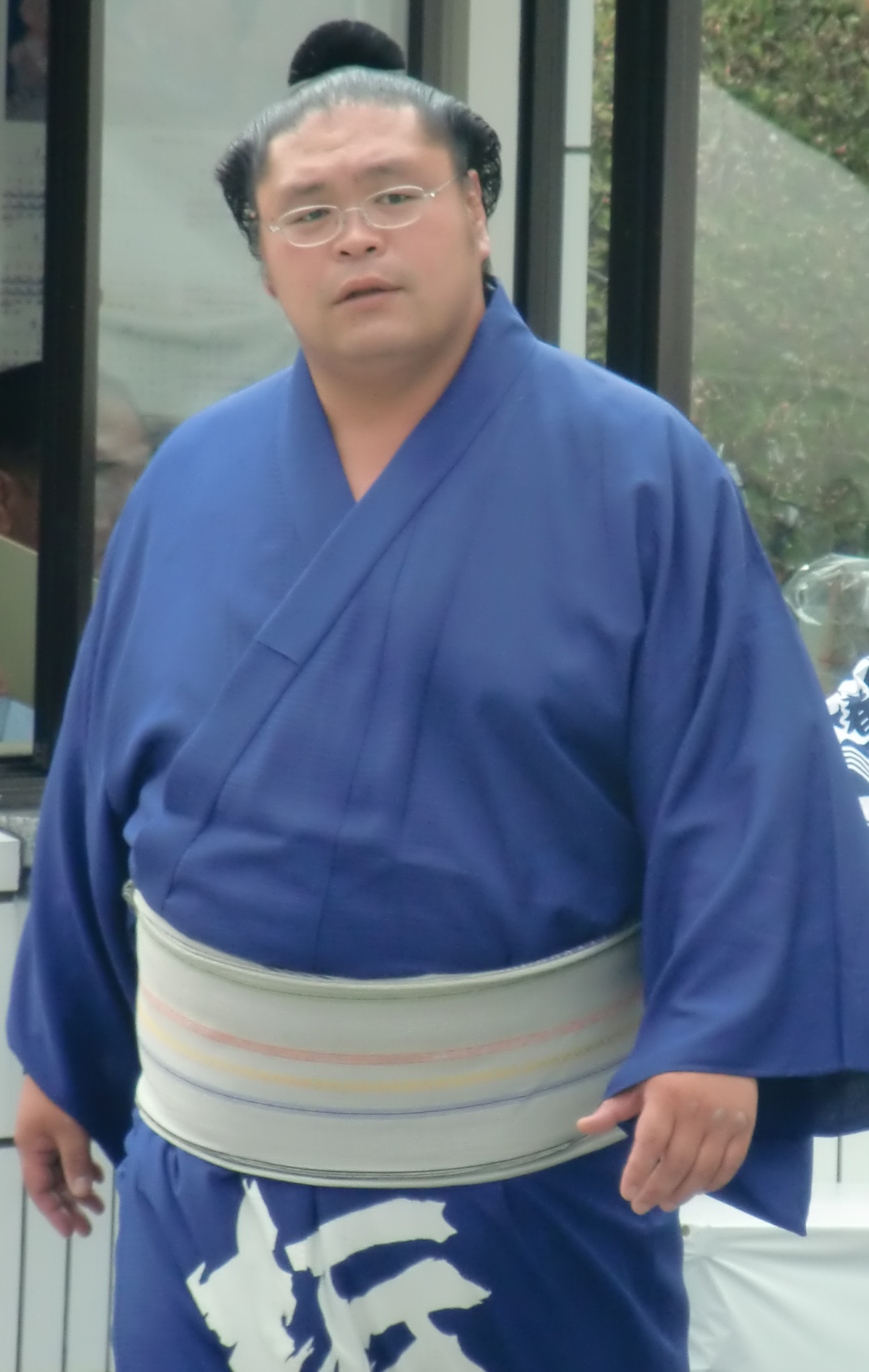
Tochinonada in September 2010

In November 2005 Tochinonada dropped to the juryo division, breaking a run of 52 consecutive tournaments in the top division since his entry in May 1997. However he immediately won the jūryō championship in January 2006 and was promoted straight back. He won his 500th career match in July 2007, producing a strong 10–5 score. He was promoted up the rankings to maegashira 2 in September 2007 and fought his first yokozuna bout since May 2005 when he met Hakuhō on the 4th day. He had a win over ōzeki Kotoōshū but finished the tournament with a 4–11 record. In March 2008 he recovered from losing his first six bouts to win eight in a row and achieve kachi-koshi. He was demoted to the jūryō division for the second time after the September 2009 tournament, and he moved back and forth between the top two divisions a number of times after that. In the January 2011 tournament, Tochinonada managed a 7–0 start after 7 days, his best ever, although he finished on 9–6. Following the retirement of Kaiō in the July 2011 tournament he became the active wrestler with the most wins in the top division (556), but could not avoid demotion to jūryō. In September he recorded his first ever make-koshi in the [jūryō division, scoring only 4–11.

== Retirement ==
Following a performance with only three wins in the January 2012 tournament and facing certain demotion to the makushita division, he declared his retirement and missed his last match on the final day. He is remaining in the sumo world as a coach at his stable under the toshiyori or elder name Takenawa Oyakata. His official retirement ceremony or danpatsu-shiki took place at the Ryōgoku Kokugikan on 29 September 2012, with new yokozuna Harumafuji performing his dohyō-iri there for the first time.

In 6 February 2024, he led a delegation of wrestlers coming from Ishikawa Prefecture (including Ōnosato, Endō and Kagayaki) sent after the 2024 Noto earthquake; charged with symbolically presenting Governor Hiroshi Hase with the sums raised during the January tournament and donations from the Sumo Association.

== Fighting style ==
Tochinonada was a yotsu-sumo wrestler, preferring grappling techniques that involve grabbing the opponent's mawashi. His favoured grip was hidari-yotsu (left hand inside, right hand outside), for which he was well known. His most common winning kimarite was yorikiri (force out) but he also regularly used his preferred inside grip to win by shitatenage (underarm throw). He was also fond of oshidashi (push out) and tsukiotoshi (thrust down).

== Career record ==
Tochinonada Taiichi
Year	January Hatsu basho, Tokyo	March Haru basho, Osaka	May Natsu basho, Tokyo	July Nagoya basho, Nagoya	September Aki basho, Tokyo	November Kyūshū basho, Fukuoka
1996	Makushita tsukedashi #60; 6–1	West Makushita #31; 6–1	East Makushita #13; 4–3	West Makushita #7; 6–1–PPP	West Makushita #1; 4–3	West Jūryō #13; 13–2; Champion
1997	West Jūryō #4; 10–5	East Jūryō #1; 9–6	East Maegashira #16; 9–6	East Maegashira #11; 10–5; F	East Maegashira #2; 9–6; F	East Komusubi #1; 6–9
1998	West Maegashira #2; 7–8 ★	East Maegashira #3; 9–6	East Maegashira #1; 7–8 ★	West Maegashira #2; 5–10 ★	East Maegashira #6; 7–8 ★	West Maegashira #6; 6–9
1999	East Maegashira #9; 8–7	West Maegashira #5; 9–6	East Maegashira #2; 3–9–3 ★	East Maegashira #8; Sat out due to injury 0–0–15	East Maegashira #8; 5–10	West Maegashira #12; 10–5
2000	East Maegashira #4; 6–9 ★	East Maegashira #6; 9–6	East Maegashira #1; 5–10	East Maegashira #3; 7–8	West Maegashira #3; 4–11	West Maegashira #7; 10–5
2001	West Komusubi #1; 9–6; T	West Sekiwake #1; 8–7; O	East Sekiwake #1; 4–11	East Maegashira #3; 6–9	West Maegashira #5; 8–7 ★	West Maegashira #4; 7–8
2002	East Maegashira #6; 8–7	East Maegashira #3; 8–7	West Komusubi #1; 7–8	East Maegashira #1; 7–8 ★	West Maegashira #1; 4–11	East Maegashira #6; 6–9
2003	East Maegashira #10; 11–4	East Maegashira #2; 9–6	East Maegashira #1; 8–7	West Komusubi #1; 7–8	West Maegashira #1; 8–7	East Maegashira #1; 8–7; O★★
2004	East Komusubi #1; 6–9	East Maegashira #3; 8–7	East Maegashira #1; 5–10	West Maegashira #6; 9–6	West Maegashira #3; 11–4; O★	West Komusubi #1; 6–9
2005	West Maegashira #1; 5–10	West Maegashira #4; 8–7	West Maegashira #2; 5–10	West Maegashira #6; 0–2–13	East Maegashira #17; 7–8	West Maegashira #17; 7–8
2006	East Jūryō #1; 13–2; Champion	West Maegashira #12; 8–7	West Maegashira #9; 6–9	East Maegashira #12; 10–5	East Maegashira #5; 7–8	West Maegashira #5; 7–8
2007	West Maegashira #6; 6–9	West Maegashira #9; 7–8	West Maegashira #11; 8–7	East Maegashira #9; 10–5	East Maegashira #2; 4–11	West Maegashira #7; 8–7
2008	West Maegashira #3; 5–10	West Maegashira #8; 8–7	East Maegashira #8; 9–6	West Maegashira #3; 7–8 ★	West Maegashira #4; 6–9	West Maegashira #7; 5–10
2009	West Maegashira #10; 8–7	East Maegashira #8; 8–7	East Maegashira #5; 5–10	West Maegashira #9; 6–9	West Maegashira #12; 4–11	East Jūryō #2; 8–7
2010	West Maegashira #15; 5–10	West Jūryō #2; 10–5	East Maegashira #14; 3–12	East Jūryō #6; 9–6	East Maegashira #14; 8–7	West Maegashira #13; 6–9
2011	West Maegashira #16; 9–6	Tournament Cancelled; 0–0–0	West Maegashira #14; 6–9	West Maegashira #14; 6–9	East Jūryō #1; 4–11	East Jūryō #9; 8–7
2012	East Jūryō #8; Retired; 3–12	x	x	x	x	x
Record given as wins–losses–absences Top division champion Top division runner-up Retired Lower divisions Non-participation Sanshō key: F=Fighting spirit; O=Outstanding performance; T=Technique Also shown: ★=Kinboshi; P=Playoff(s); Divisions: Makuuchi — Jūryō — Makushita — Sandanme — Jonidan — Jonokuchi Makuuchi ranks: Yokozuna — Ōzeki — Sekiwake — Komusubi — Maegashira

== See also ==
- Glossary of sumo terms
- List of sumo record holders
- List of sumo tournament top division runners-up
- List of sumo tournament second division champions
- List of past sumo wrestlers
- List of sumo elders
- List of sekiwake
