= Tamawashi Ichirō =

Japanese sumo wrestler

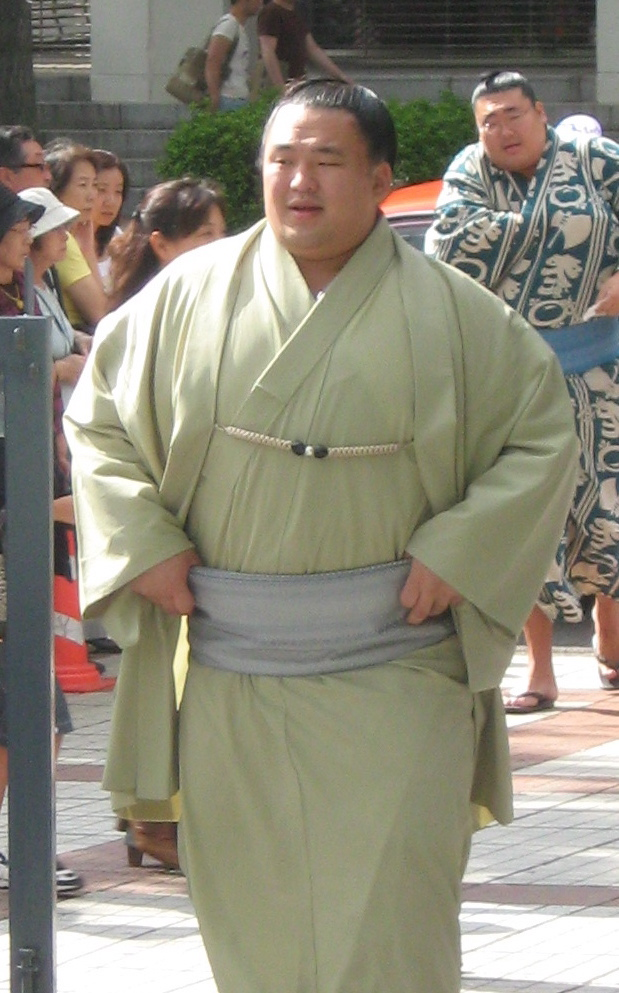
- Tamawashi in 2008

Personal information
- Native name: 玉鷲 一朗
- Born: Batjargal Munkh-Orgil; November 16, 1984 (age 42) Ulaanbaatar, Mongolia
- Height: 1.89 m (6 ft 2 1/2 in)
- Weight: 178 kg (392 lb; 28.0 st)

Sport
- Sport: Sumo
- Rank: see below
- Heya: Kataonami
- Debut: January 2004
- Highest rank: Sekiwake (January, 2017)
- Championships: 2 (Makuuchi); 1 (Jūryō); 1 (Makushita)
- Special Prizes: (3) Outstanding Performance; (2) Fighting Spirit; (1) Technique
- Gold Stars: 8; Terunofuji (4); Harumafuji; Kisenosato; Kakuryu; Ōnosato
- Updated on November 22, 2026

Tamawashi Ichirō (Japanese: 玉鷲 一朗; born 16 November 1984 as Batjargal Munkh-Orgil (Mongolian: Батжаргалын Мөнх-Оргил)) is a Mongolian-Japanese professional sumo wrestler from Ulaanbaatar. Wrestling for Kataonami stable, his highest rank has been sekiwake. He made his debut in January 2004 and reached the top makuuchi division in September 2008. He has a makushita, a jūryō and two makuuchi division championships. He has eight gold stars for defeating a yokozuna, and five special prizes, holding the records of oldest man ever to win a special prize and a kinboshi after the July 2025 tournament. In January 2019, he won his first top-division championship, and his second in September 2022 at the age of 37, making him the oldest winner of the top division since the introduction of the six tournaments a year system in 1958.

Nicknamed "tetsujin" (鉄人, lit. 'iron man') and known as a "living legend" of the sport, Tamawashi has not missed a bout in his career to date (except for an enforced COVID-19 quarantine during the July 2022 tournament). Still an active wrestler, he has the longest streak of consecutive matches in sumo recorded history, setting the all-time consecutive match appearance record in his 1,631st consecutive match on 10 September 2024, during that month's grand sumo tournament in Tokyo.

He is second only to Sadanoumi in most tournament appearances among current sekitori-ranked wrestlers.

In March 2024 Tamawashi acquired Japanese citizenship in order to remain in the Sumo Association as a coach upon his retirement.

== Early life and sumo background ==
In Mongolia, Munkh-Orgil was working toward a career in the hotel industry, but was encouraged to come to Japan by his older sister who was studying there. On a visit to see his sister in Japan, they went to Ryōgoku where Tokyo's official tournaments are held. They happened to wander by Izutsu stable and had a chance to meet the up-and-coming Mongolian sumo wrestler for that stable, Kakuryū. They talked about the prospects of Munkh-Orgil joining a stable and Kakuryū put him in touch with former senior Mongolian sumo wrestler Kyokushūzan. Through this connection, he was recruited by the former sekiwake Tamanofuji and joined Kataonami stable in January 2004.

== Career ==
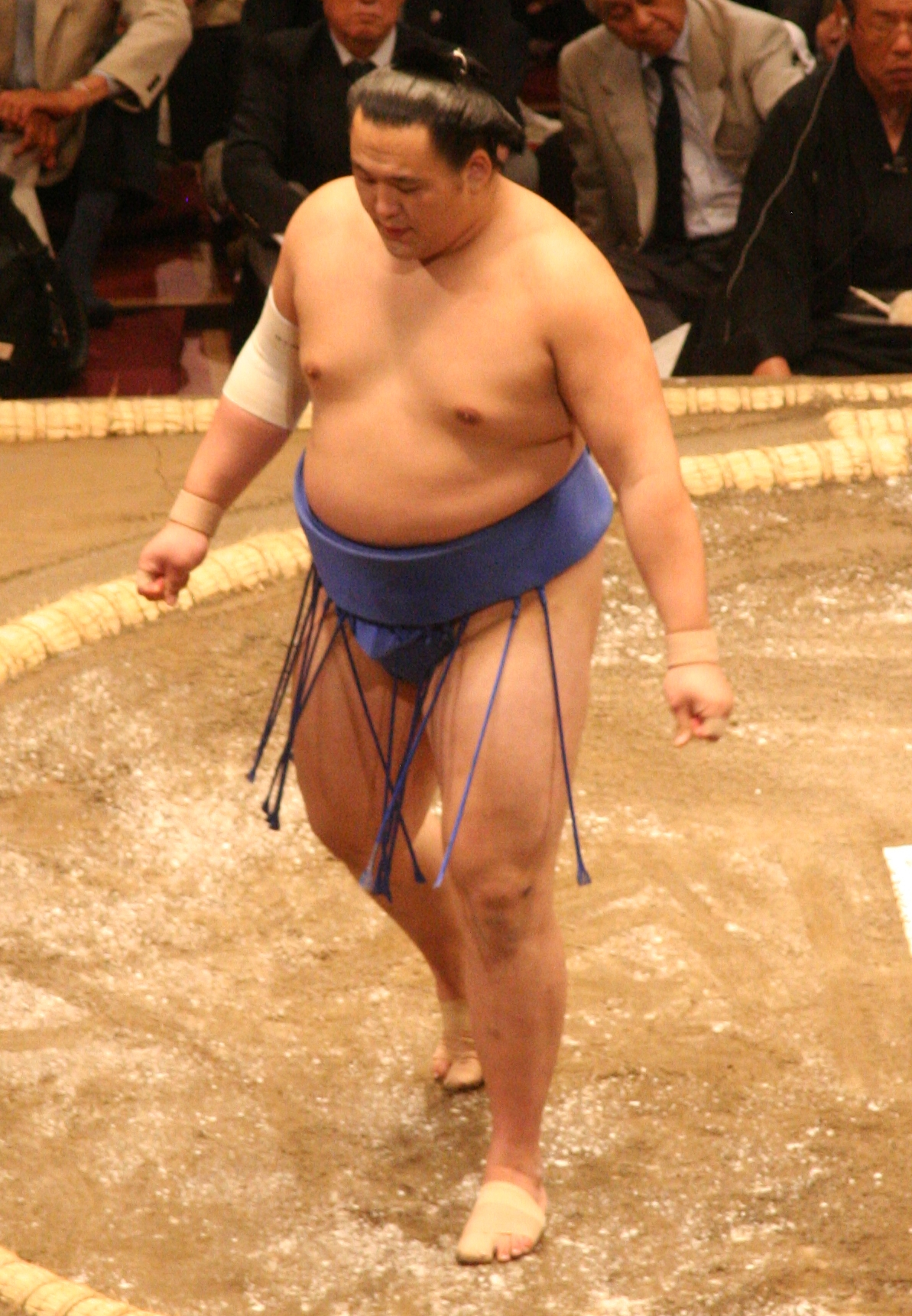
Tamawashi during the May 2009 tournament.

He made steady progress through the lower divisions, recording only one make-koshi (more losses than wins) on the way to the third highest makushita division in May 2005. He went up and down the division until taking the championship or yūshō in September 2007 with a perfect 7–0 record, which sent him up the ranks to makushita 2. A 4–3 record in the next tournament was enough to earn him promotion to the elite sekitori ranks for the January 2008 tournament.

After producing four consecutive kachi-koshi (more wins than losses) scores in the jūryō division, Tamawashi made his debut in the top makuuchi division in September 2008. A 4–11 record sent him back to jūryō but a 10–5 score in November returned him immediately to makuuchi. His first winning score in the top division in March 2009 saw him at his highest rank to date of maegashira 8 in the May 2009 tournament. However, he could only manage a 5–10 score at maegashira 11 in July, and was demoted back to jūryō, replaced by Masatsukasa. However, he responded by taking the jūryō championship with an 11–4 record in September, which returned him immediately to the top division. In the November 2009 tournament, he produced his best top division score so far of 10–5, which saw him promoted to maegashira 7 for the January 2010 tourney. Another kachi-koshi score of 8–7 saw him promoted to a new highest rank of maegashira 4. He was however unable to defeat any of his san'yaku opponents and had slipped back to maegashira 14 by July 2010. He responded with scores of 10–5 and 9–6 in the next two tournaments, earning him promotion to maegashira 3.

Tamawashi defeated Harumafuji in the January 2011 tournament, his first victory over an ōzeki, but finished with a 5–10 record. The tournament ended on an embarrassing note for him when he injured his right arm by leaning against and breaking the window of a restaurant in Tokyo. He had been on a night out drinking following the final day's action, and was given a stiff warning by the Sumo Association. The injury did not affect his participation in the next tournament, which did not take place until May. However, after recording four consecutive make-koshi he dropped down to jūryō in January 2012. He made an immediate return to makuuchi for the March tournament, but fell back to jūryō on two further occasions, in September 2012 and May 2013. For the next few years he managed enough wins in tournaments to remain a fixture in the middle ranks of makuuchi.

In March 2015 he somewhat fortuitously won promotion to the san'yaku ranks for the first time, going straight to komusubi from the relatively low rank of maegashira 9 after most of the wrestlers above him made losing scores. It took him 38 tournaments from his top division debut to reach san'yaku, the slowest ever for a foreign-born wrestler. He was unable to hold on to the rank for more than a single tournament, but In May 2015 he earned his first gold star or kinboshi for an upset of a yokozuna, defeating Harumafuji. (He was also the slowest to earn a kinboshi among foreign-born wrestlers.) 2015 was the first year in his top division career that he was ranked above maegashira 10 for the whole year.

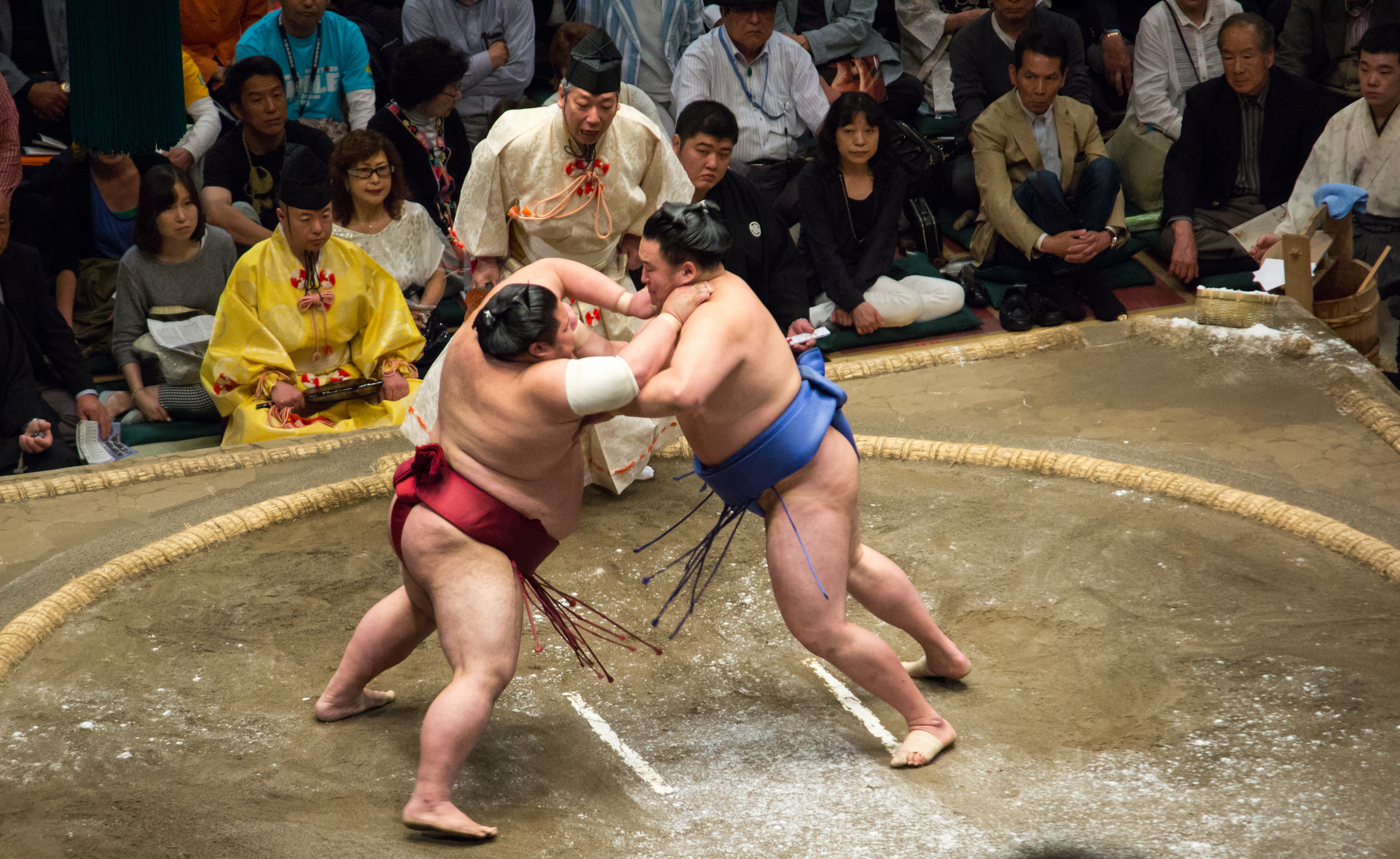
Tamawashi (right) facing Chiyomaru in the May 2014 tournament.

Tamawashi returned to the komusubi rank in November 2016 and produced a career-best performance as he recorded ten wins including another victory over Harumafuji and wins over three of the four ōzeki. He was rewarded with his first special prize for Technique, becoming the first wrestler since Asashoryū in 2001 to win his first special prize while ranked in san'yaku and was promoted to a career-high rank of sekiwake. The 77 career tournaments it took him to reach sekiwake is the fifth-slowest in sumo history. He is the first sekiwake from Kataonami stable since Tamanoshima in January 2004, and the first produced by the current stablemaster, the former Tamakasuga, since he took over in February 2010. Tamawashi had a winning record in his sekiwake debut and held the rank for 4 tournaments. Having never missed a bout in his career, in May 2017 he fought his 1,000th consecutive career match. Talk of a possible ōzeki promotion ended in July: despite defeating all three active ōzeki (Terunofuji, Gōeidō and Takayasu) a number of losses to lower ranked opponents saw him end with a 7–8 record. Tamawashi lost san'yaku status after another 7–8 at komusubi in September, but in the Kyushu tournament he was one of four runners-up with an 11–4 record at maegashira 1. He returned to sekiwake in January 2018 but was demoted after one tournament. However, he returned to the san'yaku ranks in July. On the final day of the tournament Tamawashi caught up to Yoshiazuma and going forward will hold the record for most consecutive matches by an active wrestler. The record was duly passed in September but a poor 4–11 score saw him drop back to the maegashira ranks. He rebounded with a 9–6 in November and began the 2019 campaign back at sekiwake.

In January 2019 Tamawashi made a solid start with three wins in his first five matches before embarking on an impressive winning streak. Having already defeated the three ōzeki he took a share of the lead by beating Hakuhō on day 12. This was his first victory over Hakuhō on his 14th attempt. He began the final day one win ahead of Takakeishō and secured his first top-division championship with a tsukiotoshi win over Endō. At 34 he became the second oldest first-time yūshō winner since the six tournaments per year system was established in 1958, after Kyokutenhō in 2012. On the day after his victory Tamawashi said "I still can't believe it. I now believe that dreams really can come true. I want to keep going even in my 40s. If I take it one match at a time, the results will come".

Tamawashi lost his sekiwake rank after recording only five wins against ten losses in the following tournament, but a 10–5 record from maegashira 3 in May, which included a kinboshi over Kakuryū, returned him immediately to sekiwake for the July 2019 tournament. However, as in March, he could only score 5–10 at this rank. By May 2021 he had fallen to maegashira 10, his lowest rank since 2016.

Since the retirement of Kotoshōgiku in November 2020, he has been the oldest man in the top division. In May 2022 he overtook Takamiyama to reach fourth place on the all-time list of consecutive career bouts with 1426.

Tamawashi's consecutive match streak reached 1448 matches before he was forced to withdraw from the July 2022 tournament on Day 13 due to a COVID-19 infection at Kataonami stable. However, the Sumo Association did not regard an enforced quarantine as breaking a run of consecutive appearances as it is through no fault of the wrestler, and so Tamawashi was allowed to continue his streak in the following September tournament. By the end of that tournament he had reached 1463 consecutive matches, passing former sekiwake Takatōriki for third on the all-time list.

In 2022 Tamawashi earned three consecutive kinboshi by defeating yokozuna Terunofuji in the January, March and May tournaments. Tamawashi is the first wrestler to earn a kinboshi against the same yokozuna in three straight tournaments since Wakamisugi pulled off the feat in 1965. Tamawashi's win in January ended Terunofuji's 23-bout winning streak, while his victory in March on Day 5 would end up being Terunofuji's final match of the tournament before pulling out. After he was beaten by the yokozuna in July, Tamawashi defeated Terunofuji again in September for his fourth kinboshi of the year, on his way to a 13–2 tournament victory. He was the first maegashira in 37 years to defeat all the yokozuna and ōzeki in a tournament. He was also the oldest to win a top division championship since the introduction of the six tournaments per year system in 1958, at the age of 37 years and 10 months. For the November 2022 tournament Tamawashi was promoted back to san'yaku for the first time since 2019, becoming at 37 year and 11 months the oldest wrestler to achieve this since Takamiyama in 1982. During his day 9 bout against Ura, Tamawashi used the extremely rare gasshōhineri (clasped hand twist down) kimarite, a move not seen in the top division since 1965. He finished that tournament with a 6–9 record and was subsequently demoted to maegashira 2 in the 2023 January rankings.

At the 2023 January tournament Tamawashi achieved a 9–6 winning record. In September of the same year, Tamawashi made his 1543rd consecutive appearance in a tournament, making him the second wrestler in history to have the most uninterrupted appearances in competition, tied with Fujizakura. On this occasion, the latter declared that, like Tamawashi, he was a wrestler who relied more on thrusting techniques, which he felt were less dangerous and therefore favoured longevity in the ring. In March 2024 he recorded his 1,300th match in the top division, losing it nonetheless to Endō.

=== Consecutive appearance record ===
On 10 September 2024 Tamawashi appeared in his 1,631st consecutive professional sumo match, to break the all-time consecutive match appearance record previously held by former sekiwake Aobajō (known at the time under the name Shiranui). The match against Kagayaki resulted in his first win of the that month's tournament, to which he received loud cheers from the spectators at the Ryōgoku Kokugikan. Tamawashi said after the match that the moment felt like winning the championship. "I think I've been able to do it thanks to the support of a lot of people, including the fans," he said. "Of course I've had to do it my way, but without their support I wouldn't have been able to do it." He added that he planned to continue his style of sumo as he approached the age of 40.

At the July 2025 tournament Tamawashi increased his career kinboshi total to eight by beating Ōnosato, becoming the oldest wrestler in sumo history ranked at maegashira to defeat a yokozuna; the oldest to have done so up until that point was former sekiwake Ōshio Seijirō in 1940. He finished his July 2025 tournament with 11 wins and a share of the runner up position (jun-yusho), and was also awarded the Shukun-shō for the third time, to break the record for the oldest Sanshō award, previously held by former sekiwake Kyokutenhō.

During the 2025 November tournament, Tamawashi cemented his status as a veteran and senior member of the top division by facing Aonishiki, the second youngest wrestler in the top division. This match turned out to be the clash with the biggest age gap between competitors since World War II, with nineteen years, four months, and seven days between the two wrestlers. This record was then broken during the same tournament when Tamawashi faced Fujinokawa, the youngest top division wrestler, with a twenty-one-year age difference between the two. Later in the tournament, he won his 701st victory in makuuchi, placing him in the top ten wrestlers with the most victories in the top division, tied with Takanohana. On November 30, the 2025 edition of Guinness World Records recognized him by formally certifying the record for the most consecutive matches since his debut, with 1,748 fights at the date of publication of the record.

Tamawashi would continue to break records at the 2026 March Tournament. On Day 4 of the tournament, Tamawashi fought his 1,471st Makuuchi bout, surpassing the record of 1,470 set by a fellow Mongolian-born former sekiwake, Kyokutenhō. He broke this record 17 and a half years after making his Makuuchi debut in September 2008. Unfortunately, he could not mark this historic day with a win, as Ukrainian Shishi defeated him at the edge with a shitatenage at the end of a spirited bout. He finished this tournament with a record of 5 wins and 10 losses.

The May 2026 tournament was Tamawashi's 100th tournament in makuuchi, which put him in 3rd place for most tournaments ranked in makuuchi, just behind Hakuhō and Kaiō. Tamawashi had fallen to a rank of west maegashira 13, the lowest rank he had occupied since returning to the top division in 2013. This was his first time occupying the west side of the rank, though. Because of this, Tamawashi had now occupied every rank on the Banzuke from sekiwake to maegashira 16, except for east maegashira 2. Despite this, Tamawashi started the tournament with nine consecutive losses, struggling with an injury to his right calf. On Day 10, he got his first win of the tournament by defeating fellow mongolian Asahakuryū. This was his 713th victory in makuuchi, surpassing Harumafuji and putting Tamawashi in 8th place on the all-time list.

=== Demotion to jūryō and repromotion ===
Tamawashi continued to establish himself as a long-standing wrestler, making his 100th appearance in the makuuchi division at the March 2026 tournament. Despite suffering an injury to his right leg, he decided to continue competing, which resulted in a very poor record that forced him to be demoted to the jūryō division. After a series of poor performances early in 2026, Tamawashi found himself relegated to the jūryō division—a first for him since the May 2013 tournament. Tamawashi thus brought his run in the makuuchi division to an end; although it remains the third-longest in the history of the sport. Another notable point is that his demotion means there would no longer be any wrestlers in the makuuchi division who were born during the Shōwa era.

On the fourth day of the September 2026 tournament, Tamawashi recorded the 907th victory of his career against Kyokukaiyū, placing him (along with Aminishiki) in eighth place on the list of wrestlers with the most career victories. When the banzuke for the November 2026 tournament was revealed, it was announced that Tamawashi was returning to the makuuchi division. At 41 years and 11 months, Tamawashi became the oldest wrestler since the Shōwa era to return to the top division, surpassing Aminishiki who was reinstated in the division for the May 2018 tournament (at the age of 39 years and 7 months).

On the second day of the November 2026 tournament, Tamawashi broke the record of Kisenosato for the most wins in the top division by defeating Tokihayate. On the seventh day, he continued his winning streak by tying the record of 718 wins earned by Kotoshōgiku, placing him sixth on the all-time list of most wins in the makuuchi division. On the third day of the same tournament, he recorded his 1,500th match in the top division, once again proving his historic leading position. On the eleventh day, Tamawashi secured a kachi-koshi by defeating Ichiyamamoto. At 42 years and two days old, he became the oldest wrestler since the Shōwa era to record 8 or more wins. Based on his performance in the tournament, Tamawashi was named a potential recipient for a Fighting Spirit prize if he won his tenth match. Tamawashi defeated Asasuiryū and won the award.

== Fighting style ==
Unusually for a Mongolian wrestler, Tamawashi is an oshi-sumo specialist, who prefers pushing and thrusting techniques. His most common winning kimarite is overwhelmingly oshidashi (push out), which accounts for half of his career wins. He has recorded more than 400 wins by oshidashi - the most of any wrestler. It is thought that his preference of oshi-sumo instead of yotsu-sumo (grabbing the belt and throws) that other Mongolian wrestlers prefer has been a key reason for Tamawashi maintaining his health and iron-man streak.

On the other hand, he is not comfortable fighting on the mawashi (belt), winning only around 5 percent of his matches by yorikiri (force out) in his career to date (the average is 25 percent). If an opponent gets a grip on Tamawashi's belt and quickly takes him to the edge of the ring, Tamawashi usually steps out to cut his losses and avoid major injury.

== Personal life and other endeavors ==
Tamawashi married a fellow Mongolian in 2012. His wife is the elder sister of another sumo wrestler, Tamashōhō, who became Tamawashi's stablemate in 2020 when he was transferred to Kataonami stable. Tamawashi's second child was born in January 2019, on the same day as his tournament championship was confirmed. In terms of hobbies, Tamawashi is a talented embroiderer and a baker, known for his cakes and cookies. In June 2026, it was announced that Tamawashi and his stablemate Tamashōhō would voice characters in the anime A Witch's Life in Mongol.

In 2021 he applied for Japanese citizenship with the help of his stablemaster, stating that he hoped to stay as a coach after retiring and "I want to give back." His Japanese citizenship was formally announced during the March 2024 tournament. He took his shikona as his legal name.

== Career record ==
Tamawashi Ichirō
Year	January Hatsu basho, Tokyo	March Haru basho, Osaka	May Natsu basho, Tokyo	July Nagoya basho, Nagoya	September Aki basho, Tokyo	November Kyūshū basho, Fukuoka
2004	(Maezumō)	West Jonokuchi #28; 4–3	East Jonidan #105; 6–1	West Jonidan #25; 5–2	East Sandanme #87; 2–5	East Jonidan #10; 5–2
2005	West Sandanme #74; 5–2	East Sandanme #47; 4–3	East Sandanme #34; 6–1	East Makushita #51; 3–4	West Sandanme #8; 5–2	East Makushita #46; 4–3
2006	West Makushita #36; 3–4	East Makushita #45; 4–3	West Makushita #35; 4–3	West Makushita #28; 3–4	East Makushita #37; 5–2	West Makushita #23; 3–4
2007	East Makushita #31; 3–4	East Makushita #43; 5–2	East Makushita #31; 4–3	West Makushita #23; 3–4	West Makushita #32; 7–0; Champion	West Makushita #2; 4–3
2008	West Jūryō #13; 10–5	East Jūryō #7; 9–6	East Jūryō #2; 8–7	East Jūryō #1; 9–6	East Maegashira #15; 4–11	West Jūryō #4; 10–5
2009	East Maegashira #13; 7–8	East Maegashira #13; 9–6	West Maegashira #8; 6–9	West Maegashira #11; 5–10	East Jūryō #1; 11–4; Champion	East Maegashira #11; 10–5
2010	East Maegashira #7; 8–7	East Maegashira #4; 5–10	East Maegashira #7; 3–12	East Maegashira #14; 7–8	West Maegashira #14; 10–5	East Maegashira #8; 9–6
2011	West Maegashira #3; 5–10	East Maegashira #6; Tournament Cancelled; Match fixing investigation 0–0–0	East Maegashira #6; 7–8	East Maegashira #6; 5–10	East Maegashira #10; 6–9	East Maegashira #13; 5–10
2012	East Jūryō #1; 9–6	East Maegashira #15; 7–8	West Maegashira #15; 8–7	East Maegashira #11; 4–11	East Jūryō #2; 9–6	East Maegashira #16; 9–6
2013	West Maegashira #12; 8–7	West Maegashira #10; 4–11	East Jūryō #1; 11–4	East Maegashira #13; 5–10	West Maegashira #16; 9–6	West Maegashira #11; 10–5
2014	East Maegashira #6; 8–7	West Maegashira #1; 5–10	West Maegashira #6; 8–7	East Maegashira #4; 3–12	East Maegashira #9; 7–8	West Maegashira #10; 8–7
2015	East Maegashira #9; 10–5	East Komusubi #1; 4–11	West Maegashira #5; 6–9 ★	East Maegashira #7; 8–7	East Maegashira #5; 4–11	East Maegashira #9; 8–7
2016	West Maegashira #7; 5–10	West Maegashira #10; 9–6	West Maegashira #6; 4–11	East Maegashira #12; 9–6	West Maegashira #6; 10–5	West Komusubi #1; 10–5; T
2017	East Sekiwake #1; 9–6	East Sekiwake #1; 8–7	East Sekiwake #1; 10–5	East Sekiwake #1; 7–8	East Komusubi #1; 7–8	East Maegashira #1; 11–4 ★
2018	West Sekiwake #1; 6–9	West Maegashira #1; 9–6	East Maegashira #1; 8–7	East Komusubi #1; 8–7	East Komusubi #1; 4–11	West Maegashira #2; 9–6
2019	West Sekiwake #1; 13–2; FO	West Sekiwake #1; 5–10	East Maegashira #3; 10–5 ★	West Sekiwake #1; 5–10	East Maegashira #4; 7–8	East Maegashira #4; 8–7
2020	East Maegashira #3; 5–10	West Maegashira #7; 6–9	East Maegashira #9; Tournament Cancelled; State of Emergency; 0–0–0	East Maegashira #9; 10–5	West Maegashira #2; 5–10	West Maegashira #6; 8–7
2021	West Maegashira #4; 6–9	East Maegashira #6; 5–10	East Maegashira #10; 7–8	East Maegashira #10; 11–4	East Maegashira #4; 6–9	West Maegashira #6; 9–6
2022	East Maegashira #3; 8–7 ★	West Maegashira #2; 7–8 ★	West Maegashira #3; 9–6 ★	East Maegashira #3; 5–8–2	East Maegashira #3; 13–2; O★	East Komusubi #1; 6–9
2023	West Maegashira #2; 9–6	East Maegashira #1; 3–12	West Maegashira #7; 7–8	West Maegashira #7; 8–7	West Maegashira #3; 2–13	West Maegashira #12; 9–6
2024	East Maegashira #10; 8–7	West Maegashira #7; 7–8	East Maegashira #9; 7–8	West Maegashira #9; 7–8	East Maegashira #10; 7–8	East Maegashira #11; 8–7
2025	East Maegashira #10; 9–6	West Maegashira #7; 10–5	East Maegashira #3; 6–9	West Maegashira #4; 11–4; O★	East Maegashira #1; 6–9	East Maegashira #4; 7–8
2026	East Maegashira #5; 5–10	West Maegashira #9; 5–10	West Maegashira #13; 2–13	East Jūryō #7; 9–6	East Jūryō #3; 10–5	East Maegashira #15; 10–5; F
Record given as wins–losses–absences Top division champion Top division runner-up Retired Non-participation Jūryō Lower divisions Sanshō key: F=Fighting spirit; O=Outstanding performance; T=Technique Also shown: ★=Kinboshi; P=Playoff(s); Divisions: Makuuchi — Jūryō — Makushita — Sandanme — Jonidan — Jonokuchi Makuuchi ranks: Yokozuna — Ōzeki — Sekiwake — Komusubi — Maegashira

== See also ==
- Glossary of sumo terms
- List of active sumo wrestlers
- List of Mongolian sumo wrestlers
- List of non-Japanese sumo wrestlers
- List of active gold star earners
- List of active special prize winners
- List of sumo record holders
- List of sumo top division champions
- List of sumo top division runners-up
- List of sumo second division champions
- List of sekiwake
