= Tamanofuji Shigeru =

Japanese sumo wrestler (1949–2021)

Personal information
- Native name: 玉ノ富士 茂
- Born: Shigeru Akutsu; 24 November 1949 Tochigi, Japan
- Died: 21 June 2021 (aged 71)
- Height: 1.85 m (6 ft 1 in)
- Weight: 125 kg (276 lb)

Sport
- Sport: Sumo
- Retired: November 1981
- Heya: Kataonami
- Record: 431-420-35
- Debut: May 1967
- Highest rank: Sekiwake (March 1978)
- Elder name: Tateyama
- Championships: 1 (Jonokuchi); 1 (Jonidan)
- Special Prizes: Fighting Spirit (2); Outstanding Performance (1)
- Gold Stars: 2 (Kitanoumi, Mienoumi)
- Updated on October 31, 2025

Tamanofuji Shigeru (玉ノ富士 茂, born Shigeru Akutsu, 24 November 1949 – 21 June 2021) was a Japanese sumo wrestler. He made his professional debut in 1967, reaching a highest rank of sekiwake in 1978. He won three special prizes and earned two gold stars. He retired in 1981 and became an elder of the Japan Sumo Association. He was the head coach of the Kataonami stable from 1987 until 2010, when he changed his elder name to Tateyama. He reached 65 years of age in 2014, the normal age of retirement for an elder, but was re-hired for a further five years as a consultant.

== Career ==
Shigeru was born in Ogawa, Nasu District, Tochigi Prefecture. He played basketball in high school. He began his career in May 1967, joining Kataonami stable. However, he ran away from the stable shortly after fighting his first tournament in the lowest jonokuchi division, and joined the Japan Ground Self-Defense Force. After being discharged, he returned to sumo in September 1970, winning two straight tournaments (or yūshō) in the jonokuchi and jonidan division. He reached sekitori status in November 1973 upon promotion to the jūryō division. In May 1972 had missed out on securing the third-division championship, losing the final bout of a seven-way playoff. In September 1974 he reached the top makuuchi division. In January 1978 he scored 11 wins against 4 losses at the rank of komusubi, including wins over all four ōzeki, and was awarded the Fighting Spirit prize He was promoted to sekiwake for the following tournament, which was to be his highest rank. He held the rank a further five times, and stayed in the san'yaku ranks for eight consecutive tournaments. In September 1979 he defeated the eventual tournament winner, yokozuna Kitanoumi to earn his first kinboshi (he had defeated yokozuna Wajima on two previous occasions but had been ranked in san'yaku so was not eligible for a kinboshi). The victory was remarkable as Tamanofuji had lost every one of his previous 19 matches with Kitanoumi. He was awarded the Outstanding Performance prize. He defeated Kitanoumi again in the next tournament in November 1979, but did not get a kinboshi as he was ranked as a komusubi (he also defeated Wajima for the third time in this tournament, and was awarded his second Fighting Spirit prize). However, he did pick up another kinboshi in November 1980 with a win over Mienoumi. In 1981 he fell back to the jūryō division and he retired in November of that year.

== Retirement from sumo ==
Shigeru became an elder of the Japan Sumo Association under the name Minatogawa. In October 1987 he became head of the Kataonami stable following the death of the previous head, his old boss Tamanoumi Daitaro. As Kataonami Oyakata he produced several top division wrestlers including Tamakasuga, Tamanoshima, and Tamawashi. In February 2010 he handed over control of the stable to Tamakasuga and adopted the Tateyama name. In February 2012 he joined the board of Directors of the Sumo Association, and in November 2014 he reached the Sumo Association's mandatory retirement age of sixty-five. He no longer had full oyakata status, but following a rule change he was rehired by the Sumo Association as a san'yo or consultant for a period of five years with reduced pay, the first example of this happening. The Sumo Association announced in April 2019 that he had left his position, around seven months ahead of schedule. He died of liver cancer on 21 June 2021 at the age of 71.

== Personal life ==
His wife was the president of a company that trades in marine products.

== Fighting style ==
Tamanofuji had a steady, unspectacular style, and has been described as a "dull and plodding grinder." His most common winning kimarite was yorikiri or force out, followed by hatakikomi, slap down. His favoured grip on his opponent's mawashi was migiyotsu, a left hand outside, right hand inside position.

== Career record ==
Tamanofuji Shigeru
Year	January Hatsu basho, Tokyo	March Haru basho, Osaka	May Natsu basho, Tokyo	July Nagoya basho, Nagoya	September Aki basho, Tokyo	November Kyūshū basho, Fukuoka
1967	x	x	(Maezumo)	West Jonokuchi #18; 6–1	West Jonidan #47; 0–0–7	West Jonidan #119; 0–0–7
1968	East Jonokuchi #16; 0–0–7	(Banzukegai)	(Banzukegai)	(Banzukegai)	(Banzukegai)	(Banzukegai)
1969	(Banzukegai)	(Banzukegai)	(Banzukegai)	(Banzukegai)	(Banzukegai)	(Banzukegai)
1970	(Banzukegai)	(Banzukegai)	(Banzukegai)	(Banzukegai)	(Maezumo)	East Jonokuchi #1; 7–0; Champion
1971	East Jonidan #10; 7–0; Champion	East Sandanme #4; 5–2	West Makushita #45; 4–3	East Makushita #40; 4–3	West Makushita #36; 3–4	East Makushita #43; 3–4
1972	West Makushita #50; 5–2	West Makushita #20; 2–5	East Makushita #52; 6–1–PPP	East Makushita #26; 5–2	West Makushita #16; 5–2	East Makushita #9; 4–3
1973	East Makushita #8; 3–4	East Makushita #15; 4–3	West Makushita #10; 5–2	West Makushita #4; 5–2	West Makushita #2; 6–1	East Jūryō #12; 8–7
1974	West Jūryō #10; 8–7	West Jūryō #8; 6–7–2	East Jūryō #11; 9–6	East Jūryō #3; 8–7	East Maegashira #13; 8–7	West Maegashira #11; 8–7
1975	East Maegashira #8; 7–8	West Maegashira #10; 9–6	East Maegashira #5; 9–6	East Maegashira #1; 5–10	West Maegashira #5; 6–9	West Maegashira #8; 6–9
1976	West Maegashira #11; 9–6	West Maegashira #5; 5–10	West Maegashira #10; 10–5	West Maegashira #3; 9–6	West Komusubi #1; 5–10	West Maegashira #5; 8–7
1977	West Maegashira #1; 6–9	West Maegashira #2; 5–10	East Maegashira #8; 11–4	East Maegashira #1; 8–7	West Komusubi #1; 5–10	West Maegashira #2; 8–7
1978	West Komusubi #1; 11–4; F	East Sekiwake #1; 8–7	East Sekiwake #1; 9–6	East Sekiwake #1; 7–8	East Komusubi #1; 8–7	West Sekiwake #1; 8–7
1979	East Sekiwake #1; 8–7	East Sekiwake #1; 4–11	West Maegashira #4; 6–9	West Maegashira #7; 9–6	West Maegashira #1; 8–7; O★	East Komusubi #1; 8–7; F
1980	East Komusubi #1; 3–12	East Maegashira #7; 9–6	East Maegashira #2; 5–10	East Maegashira #5; 4–11	West Maegashira #11; 8–7	East Maegashira #4; 6–9 ★
1981	East Maegashira #10; 9–6	West Maegashira #4; 1–14	West Maegashira #12; 3–12	West Jūryō #6; 8–7	West Jūryō #4; 6–9	West Jūryō #8; Retired; 0–0–12
Record given as wins–losses–absences Top division champion Top division runner-up Retired Lower divisions Non-participation Sanshō key: F=Fighting spirit; O=Outstanding performance; T=Technique Also shown: ★=Kinboshi; P=Playoff(s); Divisions: Makuuchi — Jūryō — Makushita — Sandanme — Jonidan — Jonokuchi Makuuchi ranks: Yokozuna — Ōzeki — Sekiwake — Komusubi — Maegashira

== See also ==
- Glossary of sumo terms
- List of past sumo wrestlers
- List of sumo elders
- List of sekiwake
