= Daizō =

- Gender: Male

Origin
- Origin: Japanese
- Meaning: Different meanings depending on the kanji used

Daizō, Daizo, Daizou or Daizoh (written: 大蔵, 大造, 大三 or 太三) is a masculine Japanese given name. Notable people with the name include:

- Daizou Araki (荒木 大三; born 1955), Japanese modern pentathlete
- Koboyama Daizo (髙望山 大造; born 1957), Japanese sumo wrestler
- Daizo Kusuda (楠田 大蔵; born 1975), Japanese footballer
- Daizō Nozawa (野沢 太三; born 1933), Japanese politician
- Daizo Okitsu (興津 大三; born 1974), Japanese footballer
- Daizo Sumida (住田 代蔵, 1887 – 1961), Japanese businessman
- Tamaryū Daizō (玉龍 大蔵; born 1954), Japanese sumo wrestler
