= Sumida =

Sumida may refer to:

- Sumida, Tokyo, one of the 23 special wards of Tokyo, Japan
- Sumida River, which flows through Tokyo, Japan
- Sumida (surname), a Japanese surname
- Japanese gunboat Sumida (1903), a Japanese gunboat launched in 1903 and stricken in 1935
- Japanese gunboat Sumida (1939), a Japanese gunboat launched in 1939 and ceded to China as a war prize at the end of World War II
- Sumida, a series of Japanese cars manufactured from 1933-1937 by Jidosha Kogyo Co., Ltd. (later to become Isuzu)
- 1090 Sumida, a minor planet orbiting the Sun
