= Tamashōhō Manpei =

Mongolian sumo wrestler (born 1993)

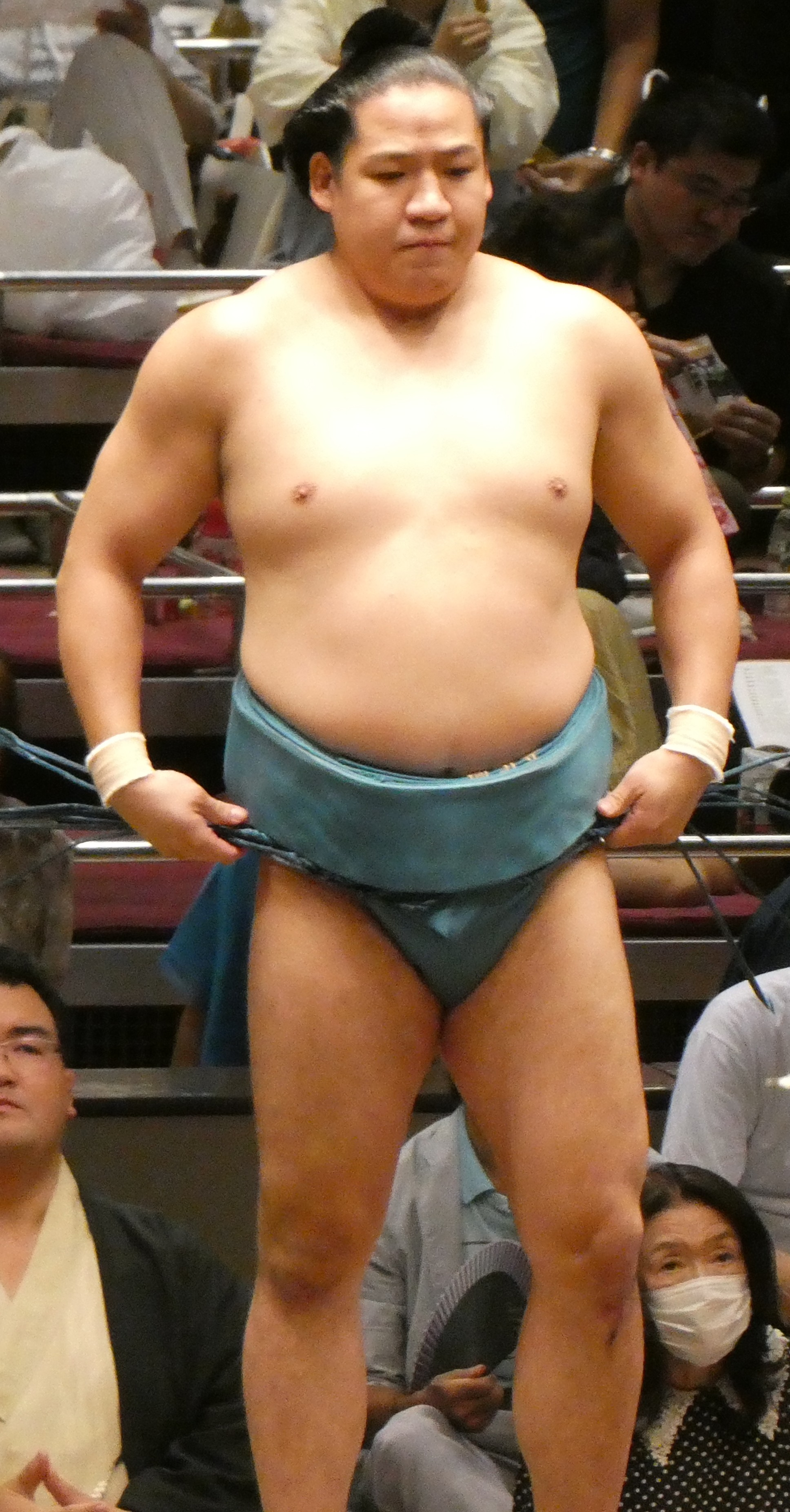
- Tamashōhō in September 2024

Personal information
- Native name: 玉正鳳 萬平
- Born: Erdenebileg Enkhmanlai; March 6, 1993 (age 33) Ulaanbaatar, Mongolia
- Height: 1.89 m (6 ft 2 1/2 in)
- Weight: 125 kg (276 lb; 19.7 st)

Sport
- Sport: Sumo
- Rank: see below
- Heya: Takashima → Kasugayama → Oitekaze → Nakagawa → Kataonami
- Debut: September 2011
- Highest rank: Maegashira 16 (January, 2025)
- Championships: 1 (Makushita)
- Updated on 23 December 2024

Tamashōhō Manpei (Japanese: 玉正鳳 萬平; born March 6, 1993, as Erdenebileg Enkhmanlai (Mongolian: Эрдэнэбилэгийн Энхманлай)) is a Mongolian professional sumo wrestler from Ulaanbaatar. Wrestling for Kataonami stable, his highest rank has been maegashira 16.

== Early life and career ==
=== Early career ===
Tamashōhō was born in Mongolia into a family steeped in wrestling. His father was a famous bökh and judo coach whose students included Asashōryū, Harumafuji, Asasekiryū, Tokitenku, Hakuba and Ryūō. Tamashōhō though had no interest in wrestling at first, preferring basketball or ice skating. He however changed his mind and came to Japan at the invitation of yokozuna Harumafuji to become a rikishi, or professional sumo wrestler, in September 2010. He first made a deal to join Takashima stable, run at the time by former sekiwake Kōbōyama. However his visa expired and he temporarily returned to Mongolia. At his return the stable closed because its only remaining wrestler had retired before Tamashōhō had the chance to pass the new apprentice examination, and so he was transferred to Kasugayama stable. Because he had not yet started to wrestle for Takashima stable, Tamashōhō is not officially listed as a member of the stable on his record, although his membership to five different stables is regularly noted and mentioned by the press. Beginning his career in maezumō, he was given the shikona, or ring name, Takakasuga (高春日) a combination of the first kanji of Kōbōyama's own name, the oyakata who should have been his master, and the first two kanji of his master at Kasugayama stable (former maegashira Kasugafuji). During his years at Kasugayama stable, Tamashōhō came close to winning the sandanme championship in March 2014, but failed in a playoff against Chiyoarashi. He then climbed the ranks and was promoted to the makushita division for November 2013, just two years after his professional debut. However, in 2016, the new master of his stable, the 21st Kasugayama (former maegashira Hamanishiki), was ordered by the Japan Sumo Association to resign his position of stablemaster after a dispute over the acquisition of a coaching licence between him and his predecessor was settled in court. In the first time, the majority of the wrestlers were transferred to Oitekaze stable, but in the same month, the 15th Nakagawa (former maegashira Asahisato) announced he took over the stable, renaming it after his own title. In the span of a month Tamashōhō hence transferred from Oitekaze to Nakagawa stable. Later in the year, he received a new shikona inspired by the name of a patron of his new stable and was hence renamed Tanegashima (種子島). In November 2017, he changed his shikona again and was renamed Kyokusōten (旭蒼天), after the first kanji of his master Nakagawa's former wrestling name and to evoke the colour of the Mongolian sky, which he likes. This reference will also be reused when he was promoted to the rank of jūryō while choosing the colour of his shimekomi. In March 2020, Tamashōhō was in contention to win the makushita tournament, having won his first 6 bouts. He failed, however, being defeated by Nishikifuji who went on to win the championship. At the beginning of July of the same year, reports emerged that the Sumo Association's compliance department was investigating complaints by wrestlers at the stable of power harassment leveled against the stablemaster and on the 13th of the same month it was decided that the stable would close down, with the remaining wrestlers and staff to be distributed between seven stables. Tamashōhō was therefore transferred to Kataonami stable and adopted his current shikona, given to him to evoke the 14th Kataonami (the former sekiwake Tamakasuga) and the hopes of his master that he would "live a righteous life". Commenting on his five stable changes, Tamashōhō expressed his gratitude for having learned from five different masters.

=== Jūryō career ===
At the November 2022 tournament, Tamashōhō won all 7 of his matches and went on to win the makushita tournament. During this tournament, he defeated the former ōzeki Asanoyama and inflicted his only defeat of the tournament on him by hatakikomi. At the next tournament, in January 2023, he was promoted to the rank of East Makushita 1, being then in a situation of potential promotion in the jūryō division. In his last match he won for the fourth time in seven matches, beating former maegashira and upper-division wrestler Terutsuyoshi. At the ranking preparation meeting on 25 January of the same year, it was confirmed that Tamashōhō would be promoted to jūryō for the March tournament in Osaka. This promotion makes Tamashōhō the second slowest foreign wrestler, at 68 tournaments in professional sumo, to reach this rank behind fellow Mongolian Oniarashi and his 71 tournaments. He was also the third lightest sekitori at the time. At the time of his promotion, observers noted the unusual situation in which two of the four wrestlers in Kataonami stable wore white training mawashi, a privilege for wrestlers who have reached sekitori status. Tamashōhō's promotion to jūryō also posed a logistical problem, since a sekitori is supposed to have one or more tsukebito (assistant) depending on his rank and division. Tamashōhō having been promoted to jūryō, however, had to remain Tamawashi's tsukebito for some time to allow Tamawashi to recruit a new assistant. In preparation for his first tournament as a sekitori, Tamashōhō worked on his weight gain and gained 8 kg (18 lb), something he had been struggling to work on.

Tamashōhō inflicted his first defeat on Hakuōhō (then known as Ochiai) on day 2 of the March 2023 tournament (in Osaka). On the sixth day of the same tournament, he injured his leg after losing to Tomokaze. Nevertheless, he finished the tournament with a kachi-koshi of 8 wins and 7 losses, and maintained his jūryō status. Following good results in the May tournament, Tamashōhō was promoted to the rank of East Jūryō 5.

=== Makuuchi career ===
Following a 10-win performance in the November 2024 tournament at the rank of jūryō 4, Tamashōhō earned a promotion to the top division (makuuchi) for the first time in his 13-year professional career. Tamashōhō is the first new makuuchi wrestler for Kataonami stable since the promotion of fellow Mongolian and brother-in-law Tamawashi in 2008, as well as the first top-division wrestler for his stablemaster, former sekiwake Tamakasuga. He is also the slowest foreign-born competitor to be promoted to the top division, having done so in 79 tournaments, and well as the eighth oldest wrestler of any nationality to do so in the post-war era. Tamashōhō said he was happy and was glad to achieve his goal of top-division promotion. His stablemaster said that he did not expect Tamashōhō to be promoted, noting that he was lucky since two of his ten wins at the prior tournament came by default and foul.

In June 2026, it was announced that Tamashōhō and his stablemate Tamawashi would voice characters in the anime A Witch's Life in Mongol.

== Fighting style ==
Tamashōhō's Japan Sumo Association profile lists his preferred grip on his opponent's mawashi is migi-yotsu, a left hand outside, right hand inside position. He is fond of using hatakikomi (slap down) and, since his promotion jūryō, has begun to develop a style based on oshi-zumo, a style who prefers pushing and thrusting techniques.

== Personal life ==
Tamashōhō is the brother-in-law of fellow Kataonami stablemate and senior wrestler Tamawashi, since the latter married his sister Michelle, in 2012.

== Career record ==
Tamashōhō Manpei
Year	January Hatsu basho, Tokyo	March Haru basho, Osaka	May Natsu basho, Tokyo	July Nagoya basho, Nagoya	September Aki basho, Tokyo	November Kyūshū basho, Fukuoka
2011	x	x	x	x	(Maezumō)	West Jonokuchi #16; 6–1
2012	East Jonidan #38; 5–2	East Jonidan #2; 2–5	West Jonidan #33; 2–5	West Jonidan #66; 6–1	West Sandanme #97; 4–3	East Sandanme #78; 5–2
2013	East Sandanme #45; 2–5	East Sandanme #68; 4–3	East Sandanme #50; 4–3	West Sandanme #34; 5–2	East Sandanme #11; 4–3	East Makushita #60; 2–5
2014	East Sandanme #20; 2–5	West Sandanme #42; 7–0–P	East Makushita #30; 2–5	East Makushita #45; 3–4	East Makushita #55; 1–6	East Sandanme #24; 3–4
2015	East Sandanme #38; 5–2	West Sandanme #9; 4–3	West Makushita #58; 3–4	East Sandanme #11; 4–3	West Makushita #59; 4–3	East Makushita #50; 4–3
2016	West Makushita #40; 3–4	East Makushita #48; 5–2	West Makushita #29; 4–3	East Makushita #23; 3–4	West Makushita #30; 3–4	East Makushita #40; 3–4
2017	West Makushita #46; 4–3	West Makushita #36; 3–4	West Makushita #44; 4–3	West Makushita #33; 3–4	East Makushita #46; 4–3	East Makushita #38; 2–5
2018	East Makushita #58; 5–2	West Makushita #39; 4–3	East Makushita #32; 3–4	East Makushita #39; 3–4	West Makushita #49; 4–3	East Makushita #40; 4–3
2019	West Makushita #33; 4–3	East Makushita #25; 3–4	East Makushita #33; 5–2	West Makushita #22; 4–3	East Makushita #19; 5–2	West Makushita #11; 3–4
2020	West Makushita #15; 3–4	West Makushita #22; 6–1	West Makushita #6; Tournament Cancelled; State of Emergency; 0–0–0	West Makushita #6; 2–5	East Makushita #15; 4–3	West Makushita #10; 3–4
2021	West Makushita #12; 4–3	West Makushita #9; 3–4	West Makushita #16; 3–4	West Makushita #23; 5–2	West Makushita #13; 4–3	East Makushita #8; 4–3
2022	East Makushita #2; 2–5	East Makushita #13; 2–5	West Makushita #26; 5–2	East Makushita #17; 5–2	West Makushita #9; 2–5	East Makushita #23; 7–0; Champion
2023	East Makushita #1; 4–3	East Jūryō #13; 8–7	West Jūryō #11; 9–6	East Jūryō #5; 10–5	West Jūryō #1; 4–11	West Jūryō #7; 9–6
2024	East Jūryō #4; 4–11	West Jūryō #9; 6–9	West Jūryō #9; 8–7	West Jūryō #6; 9–6	East Jūryō #3; 6–9	East Jūryō #4; 10–5
2025	East Maegashira #16; 6–9	East Jūryō #1; 8–7	East Maegashira #17; 4–11	West Jūryō #3; 6–9	East Jūryō #7; 4–11	East Jūryō #11; 10–5
2026	East Jūryō #5; 5–10	East Jūryō #9; 6–9	West Jūryō #12; 8–7	West Jūryō #10; 6–9	East Jūryō #12; 6–9	West Jūryō #12; 10–5
Record given as wins–losses–absences Top division champion Top division runner-up Retired Non-participation Jūryō Lower divisions Sanshō key: F=Fighting spirit; O=Outstanding performance; T=Technique Also shown: ★=Kinboshi; P=Playoff(s); Divisions: Makuuchi — Jūryō — Makushita — Sandanme — Jonidan — Jonokuchi Makuuchi ranks: Yokozuna — Ōzeki — Sekiwake — Komusubi — Maegashira

== See also ==
- Glossary of sumo terms
- List of active sumo wrestlers
- List of Mongolian sumo wrestlers
- List of non-Japanese sumo wrestlers
