= Kataonami stable =

Stable of sumo wrestlers

Coordinates: 35.7011°N 139.7989°E

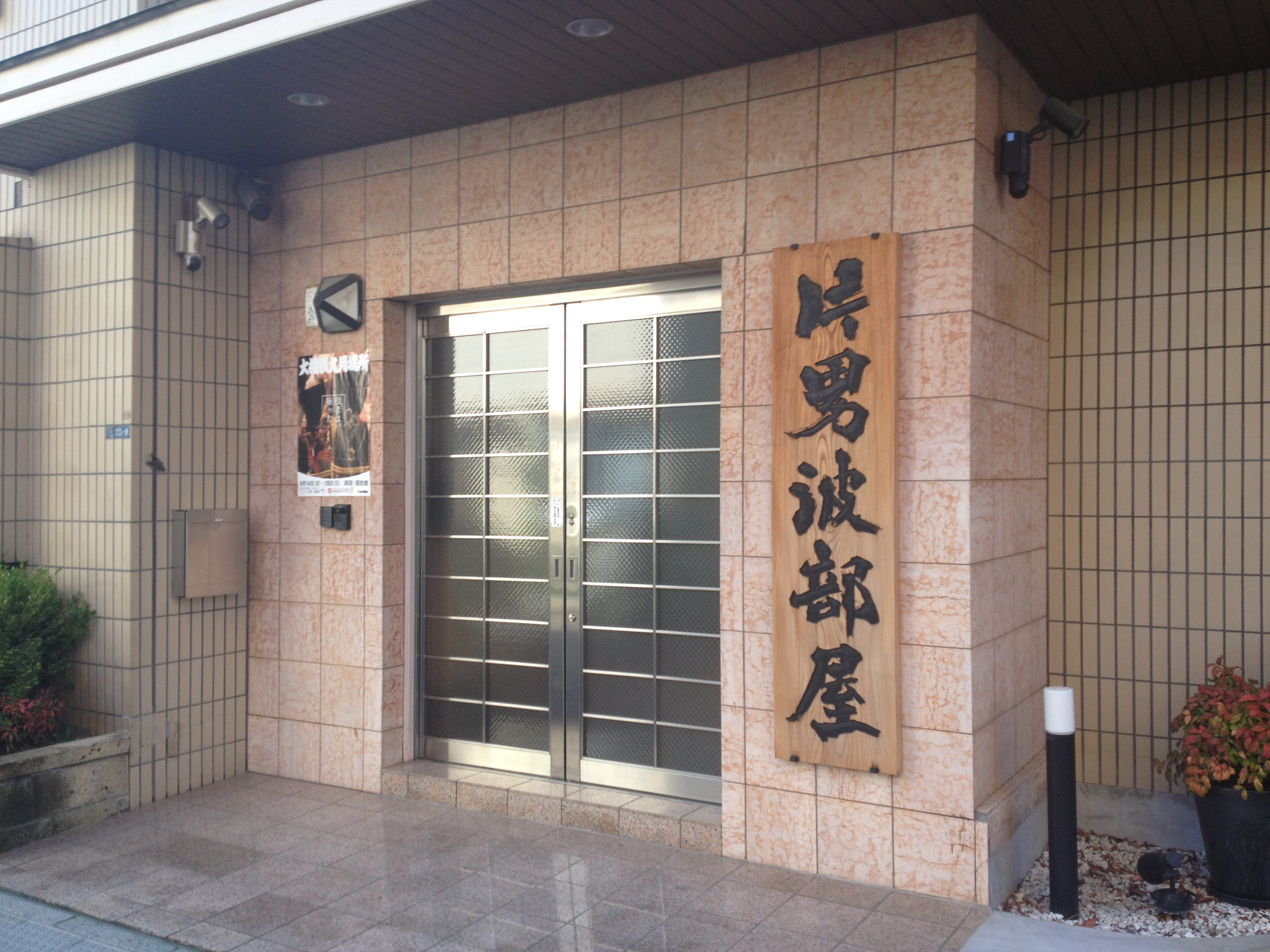

Kataonami stable (片男波部屋, Kataonami-beya) is a stable of sumo wrestlers, part of the Nishonoseki ichimon or group of stables. It was founded in 1961 by former sekiwake Tamanoumi Daitarō, who branched off from Nishonoseki stable. Former sekiwake Tamanofuji took over the running of the stable upon Tamanoumi's death in 1987. In February 2010 he passed control over to another former sekiwake, Tamakasuga, remaining in the stable under the elder name Tateyama. The March 2023 tournament saw the first promotion to the jūryō division for the stable since the former Tamakasuga took over as head coach, with Tamashōhō becoming its first new sekitori since Tamawashi in January 2008.

As of May 2026, the stable has 3 active wrestlers.

== History ==
Kataonami stable is known for its ingenious training methods to make up for the lack of wrestlers, such as one man taking on two opponents at the same time. In 2023, the stable obtained the promotion of its second sekitori in the person of Tamashohō, a Mongolian-born wrestler, who stood out in particular during the makushita tournament of November 2022 by winning the tournament with a perfect score and inflicting a defeat to Asanoyama, a former ōzeki.

== Ring name conventions ==
Almost all wrestlers at this stable for the last forty years take the ring names or shikona that begin with the character 玉 (read: tama), meaning ball or sphere, in deference to the line of owners who have used this character in their own shikona.

== Owners ==
- 2010–present: 14th Kataonami Ryōji (iin, sekiwake Tamakasuga, born 1972)
- 1987–2010: 13th Kataonami Daizō (sekiwake Tamanofuji, 1949–2021)
- 1961–1987: 12th Kataonami Taketarō (sekiwake Tamanoumi, 1923–1987)

== Notable active wrestlers ==
- Tamawashi (best rank sekiwake, born 1984)
- Tamashōhō (best rank maegashira, born 1993)

== Notable former members ==
- Tamanoumi (the 51st yokozuna, born 1944–1971)
- Tamakasuga (sekiwake, born 1972)
- Tamanofuji (sekiwake, 1949–2021)
- Tamanoshima (sekiwake, born 1977)
- Tamakiyama (komusubi, born 1951)
- Tamaryū (komusubi, born 1954)
- Tamaarashi (maegashira, 1941–1993)
- Tamakairiki (maegashira, born 1966)
- Tamarikidō (maegashira, born 1974)
- Tamaasuka (maegashira, born 1993)

== Usher ==
- Kōhei (makushita yobidashi, real name Oyama Kōhei, born 1989)

== Hairdresser ==
- Tokoshin (second class tokoyama, born 1981)

== Location and access ==
Tokyo, Sumida Ward, Ishihara 1-33-9
15 minute walk from Ryōgoku Station on Sōbu Line

== See also ==
- List of sumo stables
- List of active sumo wrestlers
- List of past sumo wrestlers
- Glossary of sumo terms
