= Sumida (surname) =

Sumida (written: 隅田 or 住田) is a Japanese surname. Notable people with the surname include:

- Daizo Sumida (住田 代蔵, 1887–1961), Japanese businessman
- Osamu Sumida (住田 修, born 1969), Japanese cyclist
- Rin Sumida (隅田 凜, born 1996), Japanese women's footballer
- Satoshi Sumida (隅田 敏司, born 1962), Japanese swimmer
- Takahiko Sumida (住田 貴彦, born 1991), Japanese footballer
