= Chiyoarashi Yoshinobu =

Japanese sumo wrestler

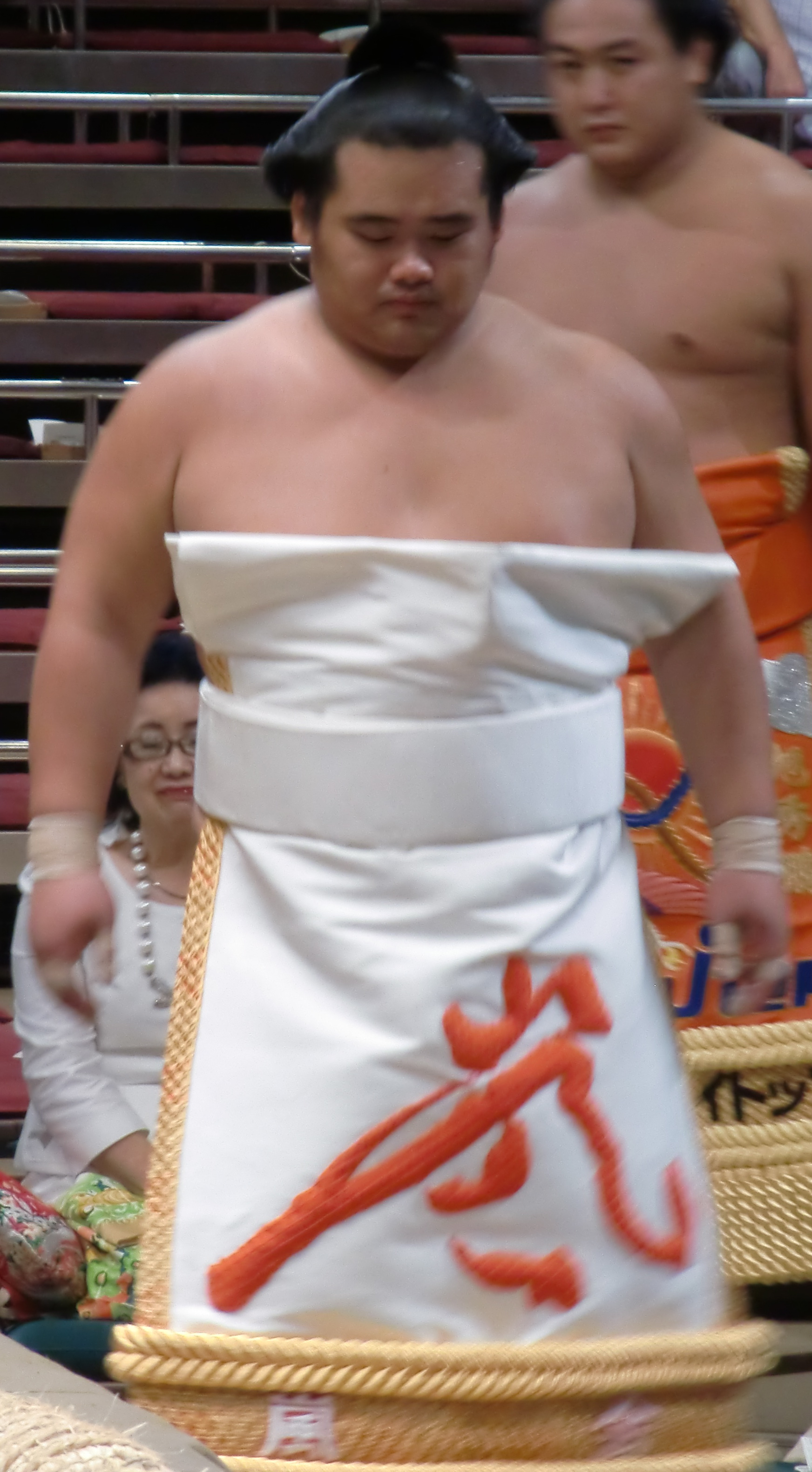
- Chiyoarashi in September 2011, in his first jūryō tournament

Personal information
- Native name: 千代嵐 慶喜
- Born: Watanabe Yoshinobu (Japanese: 渡邉 慶喜); July 12, 1991 (age 35) Chiba
- Height: 173 cm (68 in)
- Weight: 149 kg (328 lb)

Sport
- Sport: Sumo
- Retired: January 2024
- Heya: Kokonoe
- Record: 370-298-71
- Debut: March 2007
- Highest rank: Juryo 10
- Championships: 1 (Sandanme)
- Updated on January 20, 2024

Chiyoarashi Yoshinobu (Japanese: 千代嵐 慶喜, romanized: chiyoarashi yoshinobu; born July 12, 1991, as Watanabe Yoshinobu) is a Japanese former professional sumo wrestler from Chiba Prefecture who wrestled for Kokonoe stable. He debuted in March 2007, and reached his highest rank of jūryō 10 in November 2011. He retired in January 2024.

== Early life and entry into sumo ==
Born in Kisarazu, Chiyoarashi began sumo training with his father beginning in elementary school. In his third grade of elementary school he met former Chiyonofuji, the then oyakata of Kokonoe stable. He then joined Kokonoe stable at the age of 15.

== Career ==
Debuting in March 2007, Chiyoarashi reached the salaried jūryō division in September 2011. He was promoted alongside his Kokonoe stablemate Chiyozakura. In his first tournament in the division he posted an 8-7 score which saw him promoted to his career highest rank of Jūryō 10 in November 2011, but he failed to complete the tournament due to injury and posted a losing score of 4-6-5. He then sat out the next tournament in January 2012; when he returned in March of that year he was in the lower ranks of makushita.

He returned to jūryō in May 2013 at Jūryō 12, where he posted a score of 7–8. In the next tournament in July 2013, he was ranked at Jūryō 13, however, once again due to injury he had to withdraw on the last day, ending the tournament with a record of 4-10-1. He was forced to sit out three tournaments from November 2013 to January 2014; at his return he was in sandanme.

In March 2014, he won his first yūshō in sandanme in a playoff against Takakasuga, the two wrestlers achieving a perfect record of 7–0. By May 2015, he was in the upper ranks of Makushita but again was injured and had to withdraw from the tournament, and he sat out three tournaments from July 2015 to November 2016. He returned in January 2016 at the rank of Jonidan 32, and lost the yusho in a playoff to Kaito.

Between January 2017 and 2021, he wrestled consistently in the Makushita division, sitting out only one tournament in January 2021, due to a COVID-19 outbreak in his stable. The Japan Sumo Association announced after the November 2021 tournament that Chiyoarashi had been promoted back to jūryō, after an absence of 49 tournaments over eight and a half years. This is the longest time taken by a wrestler to return to jūryō in sumo history. He scored six wins against nine losses in his return to jūryō, and fell back to makushita after just one tournament. However, a 4–3 score at Makushita 1 East in March 2022 saw him promoted to jūryō again.

== Retirement from sumo ==
Chiyoarashi announced his retirement during the January 2024 tournament, after four straight losses in the makushita division.

== Fighting style ==
Chiyoarashi was an oshi-style wrestler with his primary kimarite being oshidashi.

== Career record ==
Chiyoarashi Yoshinobu
Year	January Hatsu basho, Tokyo	March Haru basho, Osaka	May Natsu basho, Tokyo	July Nagoya basho, Nagoya	September Aki basho, Tokyo	November Kyūshū basho, Fukuoka
2007	x	(Maezumo)	West Jonokuchi #17; 5–2	West Jonidan #96; 5–2	West Jonidan #50; 4–3	West Jonidan #24; 3–4
2008	East Jonidan #48; 5–2	East Jonidan #10; 6–1	West Sandanme #49; 3–4	East Sandanme #66; 3–4	East Sandanme #85; 5–2	West Sandanme #49; 4–3
2009	West Sandanme #32; 5–2	West Sandanme #6; 3–4	East Sandanme #19; 5–2	West Makushita #56; 2–5	East Sandanme #20; 5–2	West Makushita #57; 4–3
2010	West Makushita #50; 0–7	West Sandanme #25; 4–3	West Sandanme #13; 6–1	East Makushita #37; 3–4	West Makushita #44; 4–3	West Makushita #35; 3–4
2011	West Makushita #42; 6–1	Tournament Cancelled; 0–0–0	East Makushita #17; 5–2	East Makushita #3; 5–2	West Jūryō #11; 8–7	East Jūryō #10; 4–6–5
2012	East Makushita #3; Sat out due to injury 0–0–7	West Makushita #43; 4–3	West Makushita #35; 4–3	East Makushita #30; 4–3	West Makushita #24; 5–2	West Makushita #13; 4–3
2013	East Makushita #10; 5–2	East Makushita #4; 6–1	West Jūryō #12; 7–8	East Jūryō #13; 4–10–1	West Makushita #5; Sat out due to injury 0–0–7	West Makushita #45; Sat out due to injury 0–0–7
2014	East Sandanme #26; Sat out due to injury 0–0–7	East Sandanme #87; 7–0; Champion	West Makushita #56; 5–2	East Makushita #37; 3–4	East Makushita #46; 6–1	East Makushita #19; 4–3
2015	West Makushita #14; 4–3	West Makushita #9; 6–1	East Makushita #2; 0–4–3	West Makushita #32; Sat out due to injury 0–0–7	West Sandanme #12; Sat out due to injury 0–0–7	West Sandanme #72; Sat out due to injury 0–0–7
2016	West Jonidan #32; 7–0	West Sandanme #34; 5–2	East Sandanme #9; 4–3	East Makushita #58; 0–1–6	East Sandanme #34; 5–2	West Sandanme #7; 6–1
2017	East Makushita #32; 5–2	West Makushita #19; 4–3	East Makushita #15; 3–4	East Makushita #23; 4–3	East Makushita #18; 3–4	West Makushita #25; 5–2
2018	East Makushita #16; 2–5	East Makushita #30; 4–3	East Makushita #23; 4–3	East Makushita #17; 4–3	West Makushita #10; 2–5	East Makushita #26; 3–4
2019	East Makushita #37; 2–5	East Makushita #50; 5–2	East Makushita #35; 6–1	West Makushita #14; 3–4	West Makushita #18; 3–4	West Makushita #23; 4–3
2020	West Makushita #18; 5–2	West Makushita #9; 4–3	East Makushita #7; Tournament Cancelled; 0–0–0	East Makushita #7; 3–4	East Makushita #11; 5–2	East Makushita #5; 2–5
2021	East Makushita #10; Sat out due to COVID rules 0–0–7	East Makushita #10; 4–3	West Makushita #7; 5–2	East Makushita #4; 4–3	West Makushita #1; 3–4	East Makushita #4; 5–2
2022	West Jūryō #13; 6–9	East Makushita #1; 4–3	East Jūryō #13; 4–11	East Makushita #5; 2–6	West Makushita #15; 4–3	East Makushita #12; 4–3
2023	East Makushita #9; 4–3	East Makushita #7; 1–6	East Makushita #29; 4–3	East Makushita #23; 1–6	West Makushita #47; 6–1	West Makushita #19; 4–3
2024	West Makushita #16; Retired; 0–4	x	x	x	x	x
Record given as wins–losses–absences Top division champion Top division runner-up Retired Lower divisions Non-participation Sanshō key: F=Fighting spirit; O=Outstanding performance; T=Technique Also shown: ★=Kinboshi; P=Playoff(s); Divisions: Makuuchi — Jūryō — Makushita — Sandanme — Jonidan — Jonokuchi Makuuchi ranks: Yokozuna — Ōzeki — Sekiwake — Komusubi — Maegashira

== See also ==
- List of past sumo wrestlers
