= Tamaryū Daizō =

Japanese sumo wrestler

Personal information
- Native name: 玉龍 大蔵
- Born: Daizo Nagata; 22 July 1954 (age 72) Nagasaki, Japan
- Height: 1.91 m (6 ft 3 in)
- Weight: 122 kg (269 lb)

Sport
- Sport: Sumo
- Retired: January, 1992
- Heya: Kataonami
- Record: 700-714-7
- Debut: January, 1970
- Highest rank: Komusubi (November, 1987)
- Championships: 1 (Jūryō); 1 (Makushita)
- Gold Stars: 1 (Chiyonofuji)
- Updated on August 2012

Tamaryū Daizō (born 22 July 1954 as Daizō Nagata) is a former sumo wrestler from Nagasaki, Japan. He made his debut in 1970, retiring in 1992. He was one of the lighter sekitori wrestlers. His highest rank was komusubi. He was a member of Kataonami stable.

== Career ==
He was the second son of a forester. He did judo at the Higashi-Nagasaki junior high school. In his third year of junior high he was persuaded by the former head coach of Nishonoseki stable, the former sekiwake Tamanoumi Umekichi, to try sumo. He was initially reluctant, but was persuaded by the fact that Tamanoumi Umekichi, by then a well-known NHK sumo commentator, was also from Nagasaki. He joined an offshoot of Nishonoseki stable, Katonami, set up by another former sekiwake, Tamanoumi Daitarō.

He made his professional debut in January 1970. Due to his small size, (he was only 177 cm (5 ft 9 1/2 in) and 75 kg (165 lb) when he first joined) he made slow progress through the divisions. In March 1972 he changed his shikona from his family name of Nagata to Tamaryū ("jewelled dragon"). By 1974 he was 190 cm (6 ft 3 in) tall, but still only 100 kg (220 lb). He did not reach sekitori status until May 1979 when he was promoted to the jūryō division. Due to a fractured finger he was able to score only three wins in his jūryō debut and was demoted. He finally managed to return to jūryō in July 1981, and he reached the top makuuchi division in May 1982. It had taken 73 tournaments from his professional debut, or 12 1/2 years.

He fought in the middle to the lower half of the maegashira ranks for the next year and a half, but due to a long-standing elbow injury he dropped back to jūryō at the end of 1983. He was the last man to fight Takamiyama, the first foreigner to win a top division tournament, in May 1984. He continued to struggle and in November 1984 he fell back to the makushita division. He was over 30 years old by this time, but won the makushita championship or yūshō with a perfect 7–0 record. He followed this up by winning the jūryō division championship in March 1985 and was promoted back to makuuchi. In June 1985 he participated with other top division wrestlers in a three-day exhibition tournament at Madison Square Garden, the first time a tournament had been held in New York.

In March 1986 he reached his highest rank to date of maegashira 2, and though he only scored 5–10 he defeated the tournament winner Hoshi and ōzeki Asashio. In November 1986 on the fourth day he defeated Chiyonofuji to earn his first (and only) kinboshi for a win over a yokozuna, in his 102nd career tournament, which is the slowest ever. His highest rank was komusubi which he held for one tournament in November 1987 at the age of 33. It had taken him 108 tournaments from his professional debut to reach the rank, which is also the slowest ever. Although he had only scored 8–7 from maegashira 5 in September, the lack of success from other maegashira around him had given him an opening. He scored only three wins in his sanyaku debut, but one of those was over yokozuna Hokutoumi on the opening day. His 30th and last makuuchi appearance came in March 1989, and he had been unable to win a special prize in that time. He continued to fight for another three years. Following the retirement of Kurama in September 1989 he became the oldest man in any of the professional sumo divisions, and he was the last active sumo wrestler born in the Showa 20s (1945 to 1954).

== Retirement from sumo ==
He retired in January, 1992 after a 22-year career, having fallen into the makushita division for the first time in seven years. As he had been unable to purchase or borrow elder stock in the Japan Sumo Association he had to leave the sumo world. He managed a sumo tea house in Utsunomiya, Tochigi Prefecture, until it closed in 2013.

== Fighting style ==
Tamaryū was a yotsu-sumo wrestler who specialized in fighting on the mawashi or belt. He preferred a migi-yotsu grip (left hand outside, right hand inside) and his favourite kimarite were yorikiri (force out), uwatenage (outer arm throw) and leg trips.

== Career record ==
Tamaryū Daizō
Year	January Hatsu basho, Tokyo	March Haru basho, Osaka	May Natsu basho, Tokyo	July Nagoya basho, Nagoya	September Aki basho, Tokyo	November Kyūshū basho, Fukuoka
1970	(Maezumo)	East Jonokuchi #10; 5–2	West Jonidan #59; 3–4	West Jonidan #66; 3–4	West Jonidan #71; 4–3	West Jonidan #54; 4–3
1971	East Jonidan #30; 3–4	East Jonidan #39; 5–2	East Jonidan #5; 3–4	East Jonidan #14; 5–2	West Sandanme #60; 3–4	West Sandanme #71; 3–4
1972	West Sandanme #78; 5–2	West Sandanme #46; 4–3	East Sandanme #37; 3–4	West Sandanme #42; 2–5	West Sandanme #58; 5–2	East Sandanme #28; 3–4
1973	West Sandanme #42; 3–4	East Sandanme #51; 4–3	East Sandanme #41; 5–2	West Sandanme #11; 5–2	East Makushita #47; 2–5	West Sandanme #8; 5–2
1974	West Makushita #48; 1–6	West Sandanme #12; 5–2	West Makushita #51; 1–6	West Sandanme #20; 5–2	West Makushita #48; 3–4	West Makushita #55; 3–4
1975	West Sandanme #8; 3–4	East Sandanme #17; 4–3	East Sandanme #60; 5–2	West Makushita #47; 3–4	West Makushita #59; 3–4	West Sandanme #10; 6–1
1976	West Makushita #38; 1–6	West Sandanme #3; 4–3	West Makushita #53; 6–1	West Makushita #22; 3–4	West Makushita #29; 5–2	West Makushita #12; Sat out due to injury 0–0–7
1977	West Makushita #48; 4–3	West Makushita #36; 3–4	East Makushita #45; 3–4	West Makushita #52; 6–1	West Makushita #24; 5–2	East Makushita #12; 2–5
1978	West Makushita #30; 4–3	East Makushita #24; 3–4	East Makushita #31; 5–2	East Makushita #18; 4–3	East Makushita #14; 3–4	East Makushita #22; 5–2
1979	West Makushita #13; 6–1–P	West Makushita #2; 4–3	East Jūryō #13; 3–12	East Makushita #10; 5–2	East Makushita #2; 2–5	West Makushita #15; 2–5
1980	West Makushita #32; 5–2	West Makushita #20; 4–3	East Makushita #16; 3–4	East Makushita #23; 4–3	East Makushita #16; 5–2	East Makushita #7; 2–5
1981	East Makushita #22; 5–2	East Makushita #12; 4–3	West Makushita #5; 6–1–P	East Jūryō #12; 9–6	East Jūryō #10; 8–7	West Jūryō #7; 7–8
1982	East Jūryō #8; 10–5	East Jūryō #2; 11–4	East Maegashira #11; 5–10	East Jūryō #1; 8–7	East Maegashira #13; 8–7	East Maegashira #8; 6–9
1983	East Maegashira #11; 8–7	West Maegashira #7; 4–11	East Maegashira #13; 8–7	East Maegashira #8; 6–9	West Maegashira #11; 7–8	West Maegashira #12; 3–12
1984	East Jūryō #7; 7–8	West Jūryō #7; 10–5	East Jūryō #4; 7–8	West Jūryō #6; 5–10	East Jūryō #11; 3–12	West Makushita #9; 7–0; Champion
1985	East Jūryō #12; 9–6	West Jūryō #4; 12–3; Champion	East Maegashira #13; 8–7	West Maegashira #9; 8–7	East Maegashira #4; 4–11	East Maegashira #14; 9–6
1986	West Maegashira #7; 9–6	East Maegashira #2; 5–10	East Maegashira #7; 8–7	West Maegashira #2; 4–11	West Maegashira #10; 9–6	West Maegashira #2; 5–10 ★
1987	East Maegashira #9; 8–7	West Maegashira #4; 5–10	East Maegashira #10; 8–7	East Maegashira #4; 7–8	East Maegashira #5; 8–7	West Komusubi #1; 3–12
1988	West Maegashira #8; 5–10	East Jūryō #1; 8–7	East Maegashira #14; 8–7	East Maegashira #12; 5–10	East Jūryō #3; 8–7	West Jūryō #1; 9–6
1989	West Maegashira #12; 7–8	West Maegashira #13; 7–8	West Jūryō #1; 5–10	East Jūryō #7; 8–7	East Jūryō #6; 8–7	West Jūryō #5; 6–9
1990	East Jūryō #9; 9–6	West Jūryō #4; 7–8	East Jūryō #5; 8–7	West Jūryō #1; 6–9	East Jūryō #5; 7–8	East Jūryō #6; 8–7
1991	East Jūryō #4; 8–7	East Jūryō #2; 7–8	East Jūryō #4; 7–8	East Jūryō #6; 9–6	West Jūryō #2; 3–12	East Jūryō #10; 6–9
1992	East Makushita #1; Retired; 0–0–0	x	x	x	x	x
Record given as wins–losses–absences Top division champion Top division runner-up Retired Lower divisions Non-participation Sanshō key: F=Fighting spirit; O=Outstanding performance; T=Technique Also shown: ★=Kinboshi; P=Playoff(s); Divisions: Makuuchi — Jūryō — Makushita — Sandanme — Jonidan — Jonokuchi Makuuchi ranks: Yokozuna — Ōzeki — Sekiwake — Komusubi — Maegashira

== See also ==
- Glossary of sumo terms
- List of past sumo wrestlers
- List of komusubi
