= Tamanoshima Arata =

Japanese sumo wrestler (born 1977)

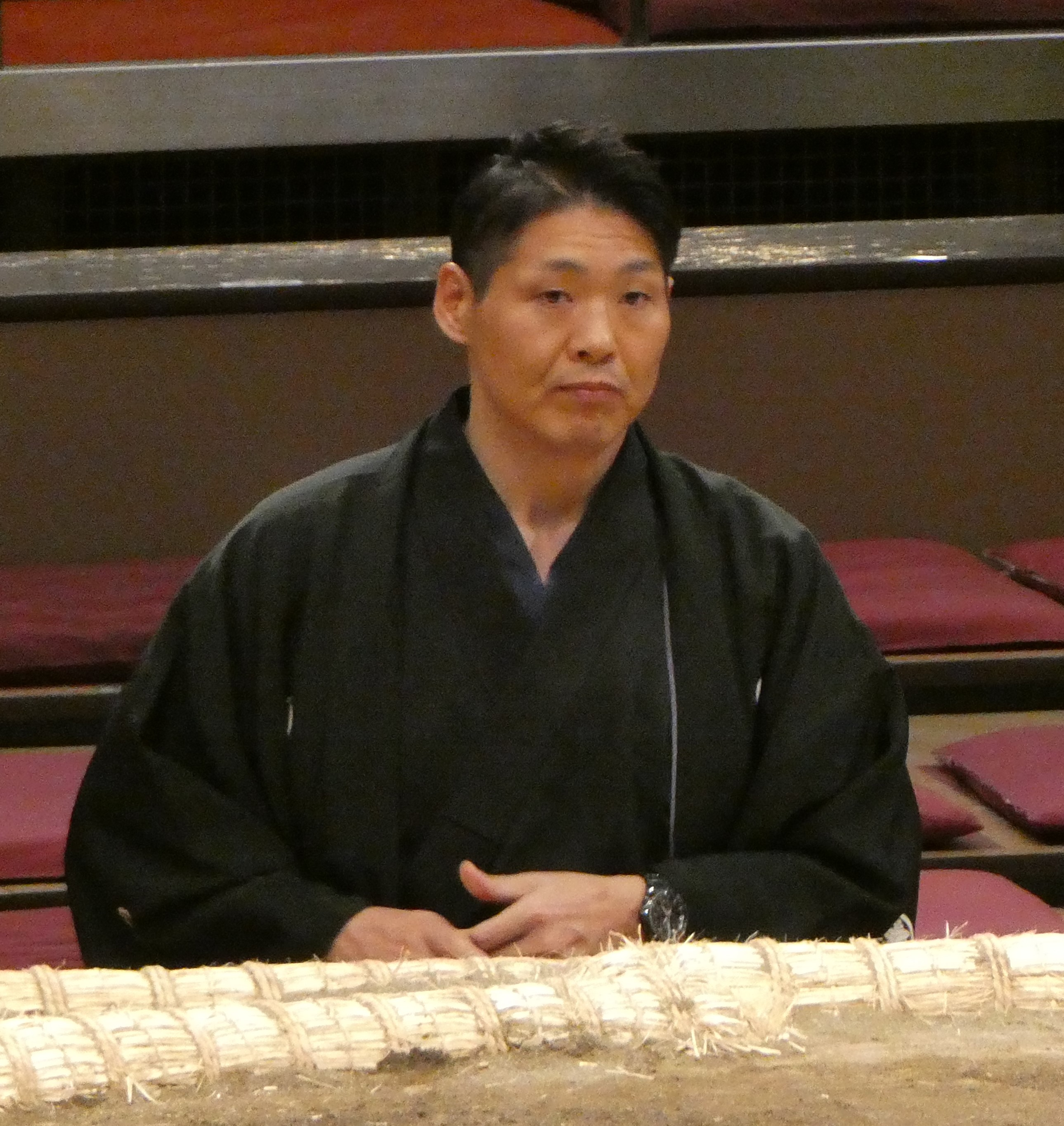

Personal information
- Native name: 玉乃島 新
- Born: Arata Okabe; September 15, 1977 (age 49) Fukushima, Japan
- Height: 1.88 m (6 ft 2 in)
- Weight: 158 kg (348 lb; 24.9 st)

Sport
- Sport: Sumo
- Retired: November, 2011
- Heya: Kataonami
- Record: 557–583–4
- Debut: March, 1998
- Highest rank: Sekiwake (January, 2004)
- Elder name: Hanaregoma
- Championships: 1 (Jūryō)
- Special Prizes: Fighting Spirit (5); Technique (1)
- Gold Stars: 2 (Musashimaru, Asashōryū)
- Updated on Nov 2011

Tamanoshima Arata (born September 15, 1977, as Arata Okabe) is a former sumo wrestler from Izumizaki, Fukushima, Japan. A former amateur champion, he made his professional debut in 1998, reaching the top makuuchi division at the end of 2000. He was twice runner-up in a tournament, and earned six special prizes and two gold stars during his career. His highest rank was sekiwake. He wrestled for Kataonami stable. He retired in November 2011 to become an elder of the Japan Sumo Association and is now known as Hanaregoma Oyakata. In December 2021 he became head coach of Hanaregoma stable.

== Career ==
Tamanoshima was a college champion at Toyo University and so was given makushita tsukedashi status and allowed to make his professional debut in the makushita division. He was only twenty years of age, as he left the university in his second year, making him the youngest former amateur to join professional sumo in this way.

Initially competing under the shikona or ring name of Tamanonada, he reached the second highest jūryō division in September 1999 and the top makuuchi division for the first time in November 2000. In March 2001, upon his second promotion to the top division, he adopted the Tamanoshima name, which had previously been used by a former yokozuna from his stable, Tamanoumi.

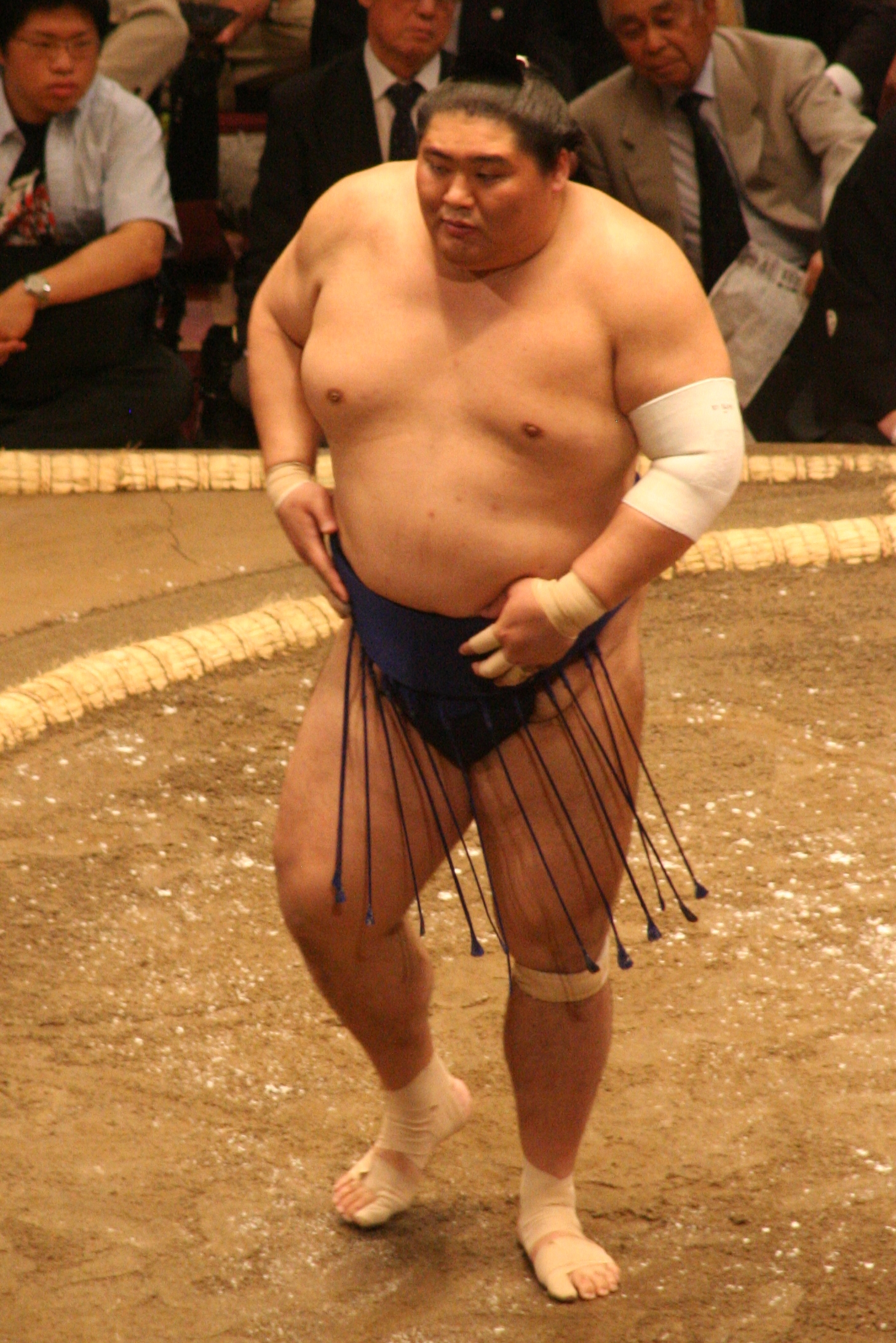
Tamanoshima in May 2009.

Tamanoshima was twice runner-up in a tournament, in July 2001 and March 2005, and he earned five Fighting Spirit prizes. In July 2003 he earned his first kinboshi for defeating yokozuna Asashōryū. The highest rank he has achieved is sekiwake, which he reached after scoring ten wins (including another yokozuna upset, over Musashimaru) at maegashira 3 in November 2003. He could only manage five wins in his sekiwake debut, but returned to the sanyaku ranks in July 2004 and January 2006. He was ever present in the top division from March 2001 to January 2008, but a poor 3–12 record in January 2008 meant he was demoted to the second division for the March 2008 tournament. He produced a 10–5 score there which was enough to return him immediately to the top division for May 2008, where he scored a creditable nine wins. However he narrowly failed to secure kachi-koshi in his next three tournaments. He fell to maegashira 15 in January 2009 but held his makuuchi position comfortably with an 11–4 record. He remained in the division until May 2010 when he was once again demoted after scoring only five wins at the bottom maegashira rank.

== Retirement ==
In November 2011, after losing his first eight matches at the rank of jūryō 12 and facing certain demotion to the makushita division, Tamanoshima announced his retirement from active competition. He has stayed in sumo as a coach, initially under the toshiyori or elder name of Nishiiwa Oyakata. In May 2013 he changed elder names to Hanaregoma, and in November 2014 moved to the Nishonoseki stable. In December 2021 he became head coach there, and the stable was renamed Hanaregoma stable.

== Fighting style ==
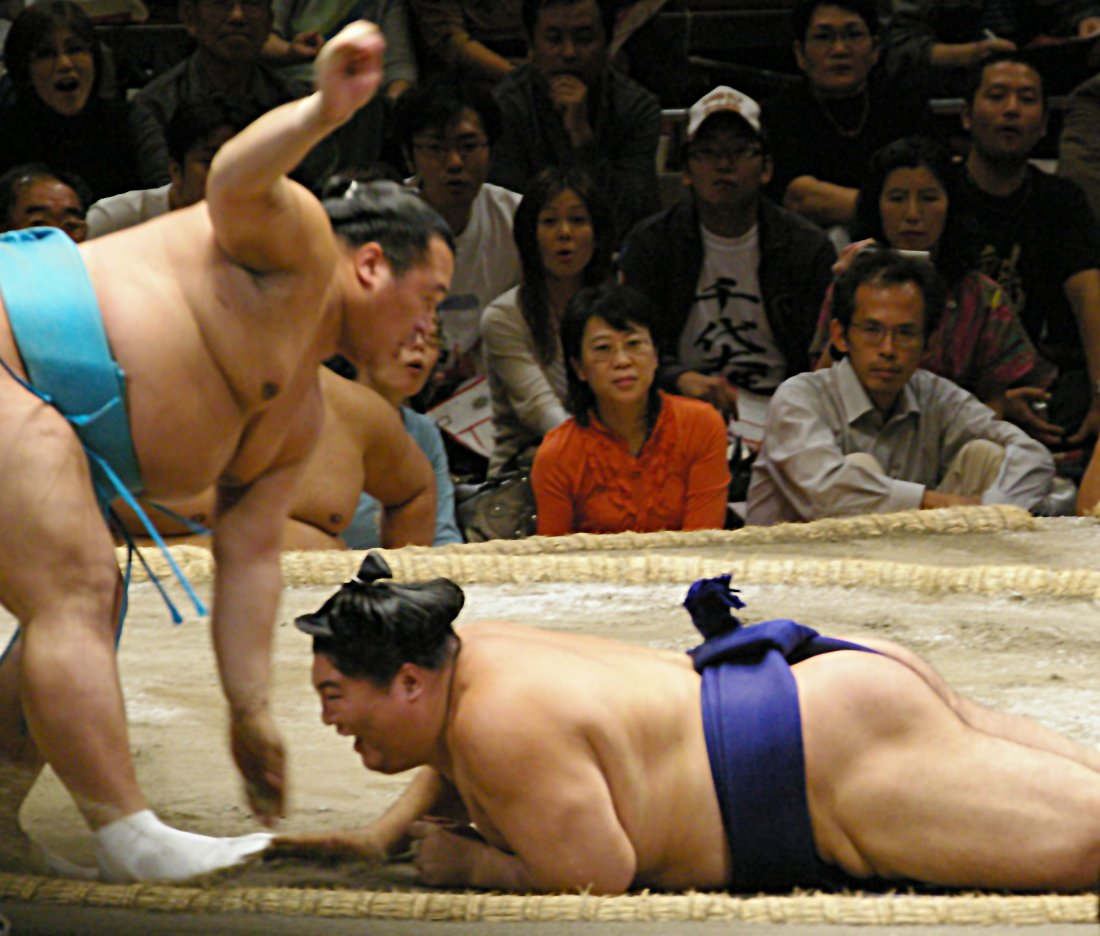
A bout between Tamanoshima and Toyonoshima

Tamanoshima's favoured techniques are listed at the Sumo Association as hidari-yotsu/yori, meaning he preferred a hold on his opponent's mawashi with his right hand outside and left hand inside his opponent's arms. His most common winning kimarite was yori-kiri or force out, which accounted for roughly a third of his wins, followed by oshi-dashi or push out.

== Family ==
Tamanoshima was born into a sports family. Not only was his father a former professional boxer, but he is the nephew of former ōzeki Kiyokuni and his older brother is the former jūryō wrestler Tamamitsukuni, who made his debut in the same tournament as Tamanoshima, also as a makushita tsukedashi entrant, retiring in January 2008. He and his brother had the option to join Isegahama stable, then run by their uncle, but they chose the more successful Kataonami stable instead. They were the first pair of brothers to join sumo as makushita tsukedeshi.

== Career record ==
Tamanoshima Arata
| Year | January Hatsu basho, Tokyo | March Haru basho, Osaka | May Natsu basho, Tokyo | July Nagoya basho, Nagoya | September Aki basho, Tokyo | November Kyūshū basho, Fukuoka |
|---|---|---|---|---|---|---|
| 1998 | x | Makushita tsukedashi #60; 5–2 | West Makushita #43; 4–3 | West Makushita #34; 6–1 | East Makushita #13; 5–2 | West Makushita #6; 3–4 |
| 1999 | East Makushita #11; 3–4 | East Makushita #17; 4–3 | West Makushita #11; 5–2 | West Makushita #4; 5–2 | West Jūryō #13; 10–5 | West Jūryō #7; 6–9 |
| 2000 | West Jūryō #10; 5–10 | East Makushita #2; 5–2 | East Jūryō #12; 11–4 | East Jūryō #4; 7–8 | West Jūryō #5; 10–5 | West Maegashira #14; 7–8 |
| 2001 | East Jūryō #1; 12–3; Champion | East Maegashira #10; 11–4; F | East Maegashira #3; 5–10 | West Maegashira #7; 12–3; F | West Komusubi #1; 7–8 | West Maegashira #1; 7–8 |
| 2002 | East Maegashira #2; 3–12 | East Maegashira #9; 6–9 | West Maegashira #11; 5–10 | West Maegashira #15; 11–4 | East Maegashira #5; 8–7 | West Maegashira #3; 5–10 |
| 2003 | East Maegashira #8; 8–7 | West Maegashira #4; 8–7 | West Maegashira #3; 7–8 | East Maegashira #4; 5–10 ★ | West Maegashira #7; 9–6 | West Maegashira #3; 10–5; F★ |
| 2004 | West Sekiwake #1; 5–10 | West Maegashira #3; 6–9 | West Maegashira #5; 12–3; T | West Komusubi #1; 6–9 | West Maegashira #2; 7–8 | East Maegashira #4; 8–7 |
| 2005 | East Maegashira #3; 5–10 | West Maegashira #7; 12–3; F | East Maegashira #1; 5–10 | West Maegashira #4; 5–10 | West Maegashira #8; 11–4 | East Maegashira #1; 8–7 |
| 2006 | West Komusubi #1; 7–8 | East Maegashira #1; 5–10 | East Maegashira #6; 6–9 | East Maegashira #10; 11–4; F | East Maegashira #2; 4–11 | East Maegashira #7; 2–9–4 |
| 2007 | East Maegashira #14; 10–5 | West Maegashira #8; 10–5 | West Maegashira #2; 6–9 | West Maegashira #5; 6–9 | East Maegashira #7; 8–7 | East Maegashira #6; 4–11 |
| 2008 | West Maegashira #13; 3–12 | East Jūryō #5; 10–5 | West Maegashira #13; 9–6 | East Maegashira #10; 7–8 | East Maegashira #12; 7–8 | West Maegashira #13; 6–9 |
| 2009 | East Maegashira #15; 11–4 | East Maegashira #6; 8–7 | East Maegashira #3; 5–10 | West Maegashira #6; 9–6 | East Maegashira #3; 5–10 | East Maegashira #7; 4–11 |
| 2010 | East Maegashira #13; 7–8 | West Maegashira #14; 6–9 | West Maegashira #16; 5–10 | East Jūryō #5; 6–9 | West Jūryō #6; 7–8 | West Jūryō #8; 9–6 |
| 2011 | East Jūryō #6; 9–6 | Tournament Cancelled; 0–0–0 | West Jūryō #1; 4–11 | West Jūryō #3; 6–9 | East Jūryō #7; 5–10 | East Jūryō #12; Retired; 0–9 |
Record given as wins–losses–absences Top division champion Top division runner-up Retired Lower divisions Non-participation Sanshō key: F=Fighting spirit; O=Outstanding performance; T=Technique Also shown: ★=Kinboshi; P=Playoff(s); Divisions: Makuuchi — Jūryō — Makushita — Sandanme — Jonidan — Jonokuchi Makuuchi ranks: Yokozuna — Ōzeki — Sekiwake — Komusubi — Maegashira

== See also ==
- Glossary of sumo terms
- List of sumo tournament top division runners-up
- List of sumo tournament second division champions
- List of past sumo wrestlers
- List of sumo elders
- List of sekiwake
