= Tamanoumi Masahiro =

Japanese sumo wrestler

- Tamanoumi in 1970 or 1971

Personal information
- Native name: 玉の海 正洋
- Born: Taniguchi Masao; February 5, 1944 Aichi
- Died: October 11, 1971 (aged 27)
- Height: 1.77 m (5 ft 9 1/2 in)
- Weight: 135 kg (298 lb)

Sport
- Sport: Sumo
- Heya: Kataonami, formerly Nishonoseki
- Record: 619–305
- Debut: March, 1959
- Highest rank: Yokozuna (January, 1970)
- Championships: 6 (Makuuchi); 1 (Jonidan)
- Special Prizes: Outstanding Performance (4); Fighting Spirit (2)
- Gold Stars: (4); Tochinoumi (2); Sadanoyama (2)
- Updated on July 2007

Tamanoumi Masahiro (Japanese: 玉の海 正洋; February 5, 1944 – October 11, 1971) was a Japanese professional sumo wrestler from Aichi. He was the sport's 51st yokozuna. Making his professional debut in 1959, he reached the top makuuchi division in 1964. He won six tournament championships and was runner-up in 12 others. Earlier in his career he also earned six special prizes and four gold stars. He was promoted to yokozuna simultaneously with his friend and rival Kitanofuji in January 1970 and the two men represented the dawning of a new era after the dominance of Taihō. He died suddenly in October 1971 after a delayed appendectomy.

== Career ==
He was born Taniguchi Masao (谷口正夫) in Osaka, but due to the bombing raids of that city he was evacuated to Gamagōri (Aichi Prefecture) where he grew up. He excelled at judo in junior high school. The future Katsuhikari was one year senior to him in his judo club. After being adopted into the Takeuchi (竹内) family, he changed his family name accordingly. Although planning to become a police officer, he was invited by former sekiwake Tamanoumi Daitaro to join Nishonoseki stable, the same stable as yokozuna Taihō.

He began his professional sumo career in March 1959, using the shikona, or ring name, surname Tamanoshima (玉乃嶋). In 1962 his coach, Tamanoumi Daitaro, set up his own Kataonami stable and Tamanoshima joined it. He reached the top makuuchi division in March 1964. In May 1964, he changed the spelling of his shikona surname to 玉乃島. In 1965 a change in the rules meant that wrestlers from the same group of stables could meet each other in tournament competition, and Tamanoshima defeated Taihō in their first official match. He was promoted to sumo's second highest rank of ōzeki in November 1966 at the age of 22. At first, he was unable to reach a score in double figures at ōzeki rank, but his results began to improve significantly from November 1967. In May 1968, after three runner-up performances in a row, he finally captured his first yūshō, or tournament title, with a 13–2 record. The Yokozuna Deliberation Committee decided against promotion to yokozuna after this result due to the absence of both Taihō and Kashiwado from the tournament and his two losses to low-rankers in the first week. His second title came in September 1969. In November 1969 he posted a 10–5 record, and in January 1970 he took part in a playoff for the title with fellow ōzeki Kitanofuji. Tamanoshima lost the match, but after the tournament both Kitanofuji and Tamanoshima were promoted to the yokozuna rank. With Kashiwado already retired, and Taihō soon to follow, the two ushered in a new Kita-Tama era.

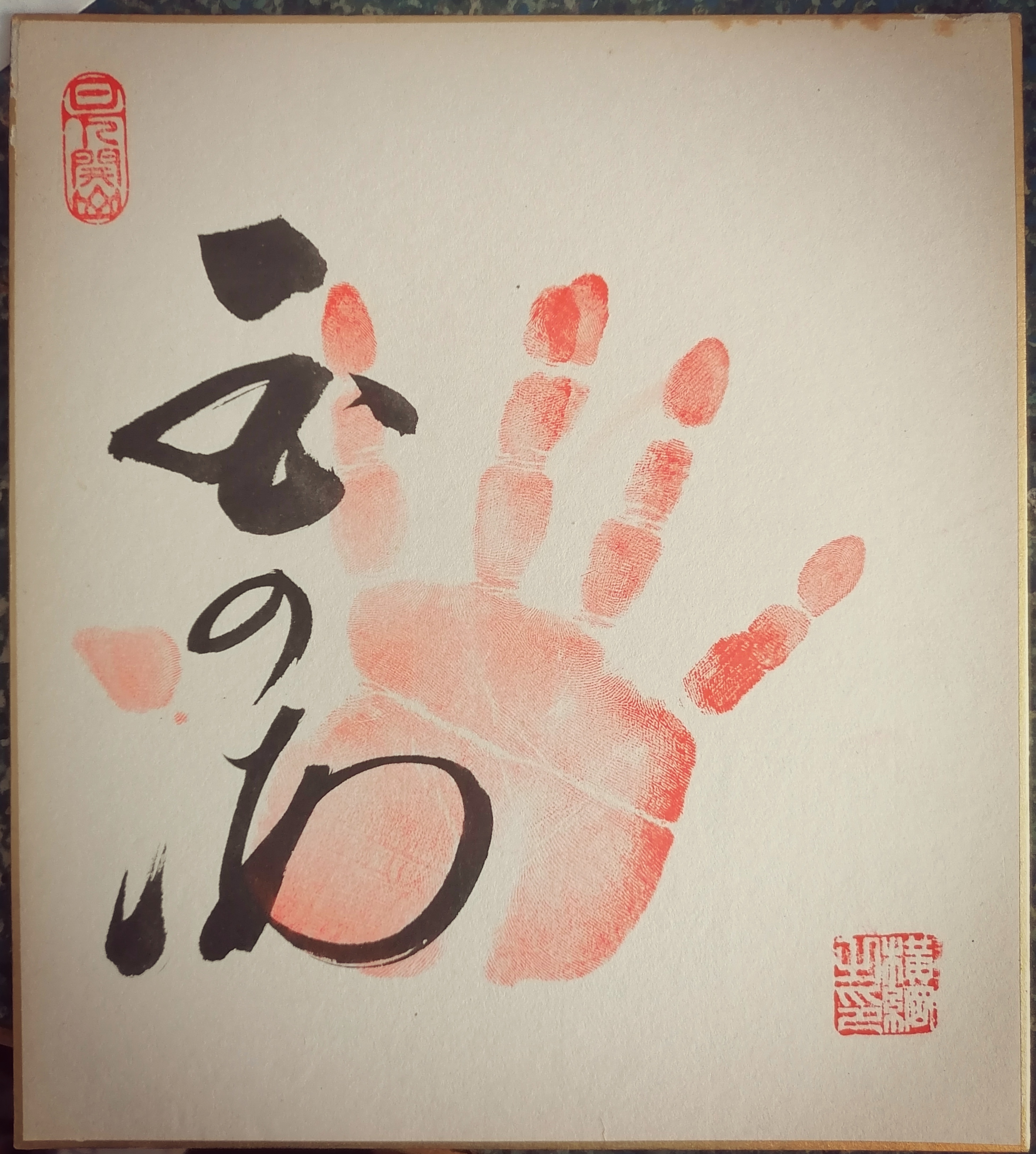
Original tegata of the 51st Yokozuna Tamanoumi

Upon reaching yokozuna Tamanoshima changed his ring name to Tamanoumi Masahiro, taking his coach's old shikona surname. His first tournament championship as a yokozuna came in September 1970 and he followed it up with another victory in November, defeating Taihō in a playoff. In July 1971 Tamanoumi won his sixth and final championship, his first with a perfect 15–0 record.

== Fighting style ==
At 1.77 m (5 ft 9 1/2 in) and 135 kg (298 lb) Tamanoumi was not particularly large, but he had great strength and agility. His favoured kimarite were yori kiri (force out), uwatenage (overarm throw) and tsuri dashi (lift out). He preferred a migi yotsu (left hand outside, right hand inside) grip on his opponent's mawashi.

== Death ==
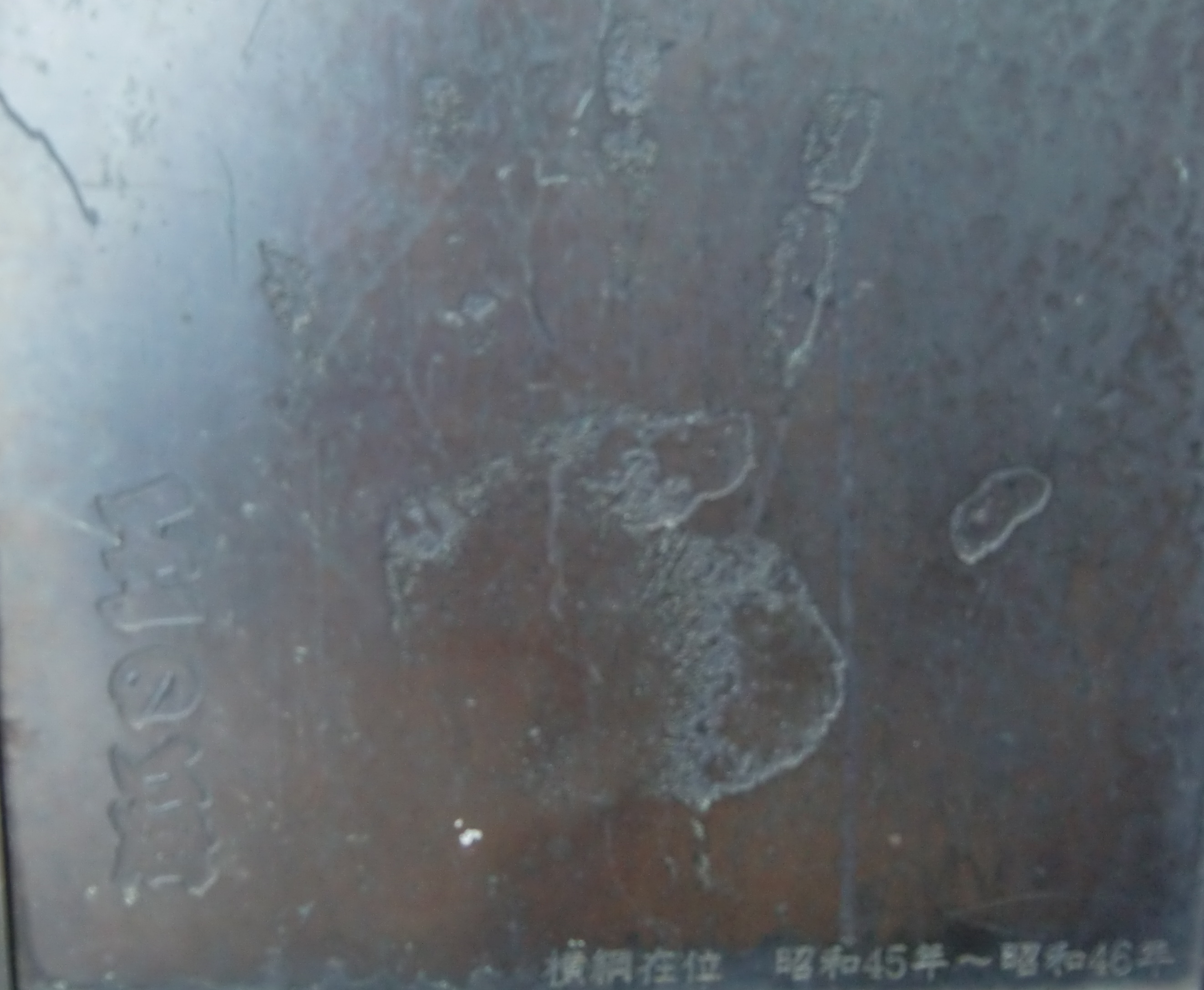
Tamanoumi's handprint displayed on a monument in Ryōgoku, Tokyo

Tamanoumi had needed an appendectomy since at least July 1971, but he felt the responsibility of a yokozuna's duties and had not wanted to withdraw from the September 1971 tournament. After competing there taking painkillers and remarkably managing a 12-3 record, he went into hospital only after being an attendant at Taihō's retirement ceremony on October 2. Due to the delay in having the operation he was on the brink of peritonitis. The procedure seemed to have gone well and he was due to leave hospital on October 12, but on the morning of the 11th he collapsed and could not be saved. It emerged he had suffered a pulmonary embolism. He was only the fourth man in history to die whilst an active yokozuna. Kitanofuji was a good friend of Tamanoumi as well as a rival and was shocked by his death. He was just 27 years old and considered to be in his prime and likely to have won many more championships had he lived. In his last seven tournaments he had won four and been runner-up in the other three, and had lost only nine out of 105 bouts. His winning percentage as a yokozuna was .867, second only to Futabayama in the 20th century, and he gave away only three kinboshi in that time.

== Career record ==
Tamanoumi Masahiro
Year	January Hatsu basho, Tokyo	March Haru basho, Osaka	May Natsu basho, Tokyo	July Nagoya basho, Nagoya	September Aki basho, Tokyo	November Kyūshū basho, Fukuoka
1959	x	(Maezumo)	West Jonokuchi #27; 6–2	West Jonidan #105; 8–0; Champion	East Sandanme #104; 5–3	West Sandanme #72; 4–4
1960	West Sandanme #71; 4–4	East Sandanme #61; 5–3	West Sandanme #40; 6–2	West Sandanme #9; 3–4	West Sandanme #19; 6–1	West Makushita #77; 4–3
1961	East Makushita #70; 5–2	East Makushita #48; 6–1	East Makushita #22; 4–3	East Makushita #20; 5–2	East Makushita #14; 3–4	West Makushita #18; 4–3
1962	East Makushita #17; 4–3	East Makushita #15; 4–3	West Makushita #11; 4–3	West Makushita #8; 1–6	East Makushita #27; 4–3	West Makushita #22; 3–4
1963	West Makushita #25; 6–1	West Makushita #14; 4–3	East Makushita #12; 6–1	East Makushita #4; 6–1	East Jūryō #18; 9–6	West Jūryō #15; 10–5
1964	West Jūryō #4; 11–4	East Maegashira #15; 9–6	West Maegashira #9; 8–7	West Maegashira #6; 8–7	West Maegashira #4; 8–7	West Maegashira #1; 9–6
1965	East Komusubi #1; 5–10	East Maegashira #3; 9–6; O★★	West Komusubi #1; 8–7; O	West Sekiwake #1; 6–9	West Maegashira #1; 7–8 ★	West Maegashira #2; 4–11
1966	West Maegashira #8; 13–2; F	East Maegashira #1; 9–6 ★	West Sekiwake #1; 10–5; F	West Sekiwake #1; 9–6; O	East Sekiwake #1; 11–4; O	West Ōzeki; 9–6
1967	West Ōzeki #1; 9–6	West Ōzeki #1; 7–8	West Ōzeki #1; 8–7	East Ōzeki #1; 9–6	West Ōzeki #1; 9–6	West Ōzeki #1; 11–4
1968	East Ōzeki #1; 12–3	East Ōzeki #1; 12–3	East Ōzeki #1; 13–2	East Ōzeki #1; 10–5	West Ōzeki #1; 10–5	East Ōzeki #1; 12–3
1969	East Ōzeki #1; 12–3	East Ōzeki #1; 10–5	West Ōzeki #1; 8–7	West Ōzeki #2; 9–6	West Ōzeki #2; 13–2	East Ōzeki #1; 10–5
1970	West Ōzeki #1; 13–2–P	West Yokozuna #1; 13–2	East Yokozuna #2; 12–3	East Yokozuna #2; 9–6	West Yokozuna #1; 14–1	East Yokozuna #1; 14–1–P
1971	East Yokozuna #1; 14–1–P	East Yokozuna #1; 14–1	East Yokozuna #1; 13–2	West Yokozuna #1; 15–0	East Yokozuna #1; 12–3	Retired –
Record given as wins–losses–absences Top division champion Top division runner-up Retired Lower divisions Non-participation Sanshō key: F=Fighting spirit; O=Outstanding performance; T=Technique Also shown: ★=Kinboshi; P=Playoff(s); Divisions: Makuuchi — Jūryō — Makushita — Sandanme — Jonidan — Jonokuchi Makuuchi ranks: Yokozuna — Ōzeki — Sekiwake — Komusubi — Maegashira

== See also ==
- Glossary of sumo terms
- List of past sumo wrestlers
- List of sumo tournament top division champions
- List of sumo tournament top division runners-up
- List of yokozuna

Preceded by Sadanoyama Shinmatsu	51st Yokozuna; January 1970 – October 1971	Succeeded by Kitanofuji Katsuaki
Yokozuna is not a successive rank, and more than one wrestler can hold the title at once
