= Tamanoumi Daitarō =

Japanese sumo wrestler

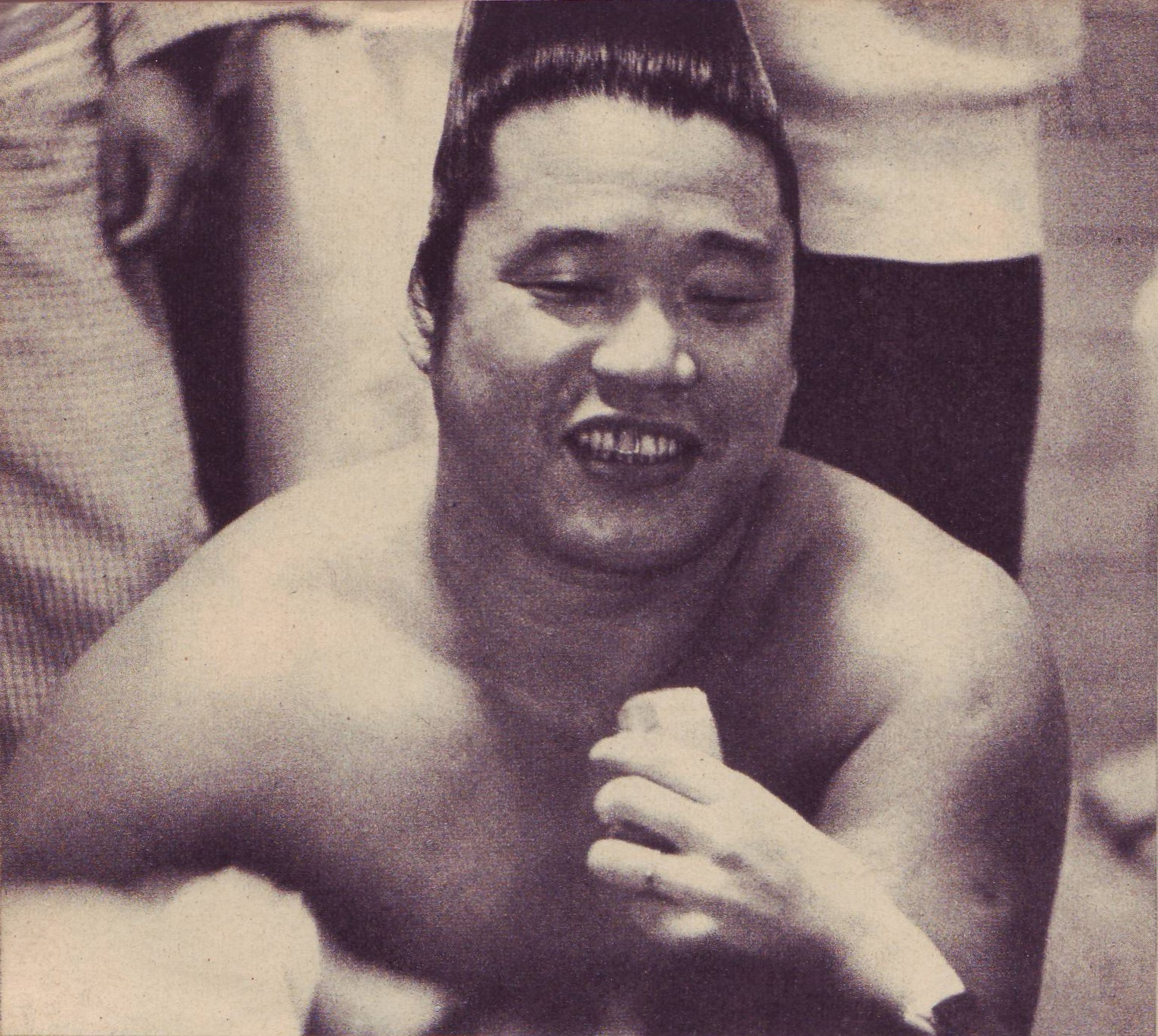

Personal information
- Native name: 玉乃海 代太郎
- Born: Tomohiro Miura; 2 January 1923 Ōita, Japan
- Died: 27 September 1987 (aged 64)
- Height: 1.81 m (5 ft 11 1/2 in)
- Weight: 120 kg (260 lb)

Sport
- Sport: Sumo
- Retired: January, 1961
- Heya: Nishonoseki
- Record: 390–325–36
- Debut: May, 1937
- Highest rank: Sekiwake (January 1957)
- Elder name: Kataonami
- Championships: 1 (Makuuchi); 1 (Jonokuchi)
- Special Prizes: Outstanding Performance (2); Fighting Spirit (3)
- Gold Stars: 9 Tochinishiki (4); Chiyonoyama (2); Haguroyama; Kagamisato; Yoshibayama
- Updated on June 2020

Tamanoumi Daitarō (real name Tomohiro Miura; 2 January 1923 – 27 September 1987) was a sumo wrestler from Ōita, Japan. His highest rank was sekiwake. He won a top division tournament championship in 1957. He was later the head coach of Kataonami stable.

== Career ==
He made his professional debut at the age of 14 in May 1937, joining Nishonoseki stable, then run by active yokozuna Tamanishiki, although upon Tamanishiki's death the following year Tamanoumi Umekichi became his stablemaster. He used the shikona of Fukusumi. However, during a sumo tour of Shanghai in 1940, he got into a drunken argument with a driver. Military police went to the site and he also began to fight with them. Police officers wanted him shot, but ōzeki Haguroyama (later yokozuna) and his stablemaster apologized to them. He survived, but was forced to leave sumo and was drafted into the Japanese army. After escaping a POW camp in Siberia and returning to Japan to work in a shipyard, he was invited to return to sumo in 1950. He was allowed to resume his career in the third makushita division where he had left off, and made the jūryō division in 1951, adopting the Tamanoumi name, and the top makuuchi division the year after, when he was already 29 years old. In May 1953, he faced Haguroyama in the ring for the only time. Tamanoumi defeated the man who had helped save his life, in what was to be the last bout of Haguroyama's career.

Tamanoumi reached his highest rank of sekiwake in 1957 but then was forced to sit out a couple of tournaments through injury. He fell to the maegashira ranks and considered retiring, but came back to win the top division tournament championship in November 1957 (the first time the Kyūshū honbasho had been staged) with a perfect 15–0 score. During that tournament he wore a gold-coloured mawashi, the first wrestler to flout the Japan Sumo Association's rule that only dark colours should be worn. It had been given to him by the chairman of his supporter's club, who was also the head of the shipping company for whom he had worked in his years out of sumo. Because other wrestlers regarded it as a symbol of good luck, and also because NHK began colour broadcasts of sumo matches in 1960, many others have followed Tamanoumi's lead and worn brightly coloured mawashi. He was runner-up in two other tournaments and earned nine kinboshi or gold stars for defeating yokozuna.

== Retirement from sumo ==
He retired in January 1961 at the age of 38, and opened up the Kataonami stable, which he ran until his death. The stable produced the yokozuna Tamanoumi Masahiro. In his later years he was also a somewhat controversial commentator for NHK's sumo coverage.

== Personal life ==
His second wife was a teacher of traditional Japanese music as well as a professional singer.

== Career record ==
Tamanoumi Daitarō
| - | Spring Haru basho, Tokyo | Summer Natsu basho, Tokyo | Autumn Aki basho, Tokyo |
|---|---|---|---|
| 1937 | x | (Maezumo) | Not held |
| 1938 | Shinjo; 1–2 | West Jonokuchi #1; 6–1; Champion | Not held |
| 1939 | East Jonidan #2; 4–3 | East Sandanme #27; 4–4 | Not held |
| 1940 | East Sandanme #25; 4–3–1 | West Sandanme #23; 6–2 | Not held |
| 1941 | East Makushita #31; 3–5 | Out of sumo | Not held |
| 1942 | Out of sumo | Out of sumo | Not held |
| 1943 | Out of sumo | Out of sumo | Not held |
| 1944 | Out of sumo | Out of sumo | Out of sumo |
| 1945 | Not held | Out of sumo | Out of sumo |
| 1946 | Not held | Not held | Out of sumo |
| 1947 | Not held | Out of sumo | Out of sumo |
| 1948 | Not held | Out of sumo | Out of sumo |
| 1949 | Out of sumo | Out of sumo | Out of sumo |
| 1950 | Out of sumo | West Makushita #28; 12–3 | East Makushita #16; 11–4 |
| 1951 | East Makushita #6; 11–4 | West Jūryō #14; 9–6 | East Jūryō #8; 8–5–2 |
| 1952 | East Jūryō #7; 11–4 | West Jūryō #3; 10–5 | East Maegashira #18; 10–5 |
Record given as wins–losses–absences Top division champion Top division runner-up Retired Lower divisions Non-participation Sanshō key: F=Fighting spirit; O=Outstanding performance; T=Technique Also shown: ★=Kinboshi; P=Playoff(s); Divisions: Makuuchi — Jūryō — Makushita — Sandanme — Jonidan — Jonokuchi Makuuchi ranks: Yokozuna — Ōzeki — Sekiwake — Komusubi — Maegashira

| - | New Year Hatsu basho, Tokyo | Spring Haru basho, Osaka | Summer Natsu basho, Tokyo | Autumn Aki basho, Tokyo |
|---|---|---|---|---|
| 1953 | East Maegashira #9; 13–2; F | West Maegashira #1; 7–8 | West Maegashira #2; 5–7–3 ★ | East Maegashira #4; 8–7 |
| 1954 | East Maegashira #3; 7–8 | East Maegashira #4; 5–10 | West Maegashira #6; 6–6–3 | West Maegashira #7; 9–6 |
| 1955 | East Maegashira #5; 8–7 | East Maegashira #4; 7–8 ★ | West Maegashira #4; 6–9 | West Maegashira #6; 8–7 ★★ |
| 1956 | West Maegashira #3; 5–10 | East Maegashira #6; 10–5 | East Maegashira #2; 10–5 ★★ | East Komusubi; 9–6; O |
Record given as wins–losses–absences Top division champion Top division runner-up Retired Lower divisions Non-participation Sanshō key: F=Fighting spirit; O=Outstanding performance; T=Technique Also shown: ★=Kinboshi; P=Playoff(s); Divisions: Makuuchi — Jūryō — Makushita — Sandanme — Jonidan — Jonokuchi Makuuchi ranks: Yokozuna — Ōzeki — Sekiwake — Komusubi — Maegashira

| Year | January Hatsu basho, Tokyo | March Haru basho, Osaka | May Natsu basho, Tokyo | July Nagoya basho, Nagoya | September Aki basho, Tokyo | November Kyūshū basho, Fukuoka |
|---|---|---|---|---|---|---|
| 1957 | West Sekiwake; 11–4; F | East Sekiwake; 11–4; O | East Sekiwake; 0–6–9 | Not held | Sat out due to injury 0–0–15 | West Maegashira #14; 15–0; F |
| 1958 | West Komusubi; 5–10 | East Maegashira #3; 6–9 ★ | West Maegashira #6; 11–4 | West Komusubi; 6–9 | East Maegashira #2; 10–5 ★★ | West Komusubi; 8–7 |
| 1959 | West Sekiwake; 9–6 | West Sekiwake; 4–9–2 | East Maegashira #5; 8–7 | East Maegashira #2; 4–11 | West Maegashira #7; 9–6 | West Maegashira #1; 12–3 |
| 1960 | West Komusubi; 4–11 | East Maegashira #5; 3–12 | West Maegashira #13; 10–5 | West Maegashira #5; 4–11 | East Maegashira #8; 7–8 | East Maegashira #9; 6–9 |
| 1961 | East Maegashira #13; Retired; 7–8 | x | x | x | x | x |
Record given as wins–losses–absences Top division champion Top division runner-up Retired Lower divisions Non-participation Sanshō key: F=Fighting spirit; O=Outstanding performance; T=Technique Also shown: ★=Kinboshi; P=Playoff(s); Divisions: Makuuchi — Jūryō — Makushita — Sandanme — Jonidan — Jonokuchi Makuuchi ranks: Yokozuna — Ōzeki — Sekiwake — Komusubi — Maegashira

== See also ==
- List of sumo record holders
- List of sumo tournament second division champions
- List of sumo tournament top division champions
- Glossary of sumo terms
- List of past sumo wrestlers
- List of sekiwake
