= Tamakasuga Ryōji =

Japanese sumo wrestler

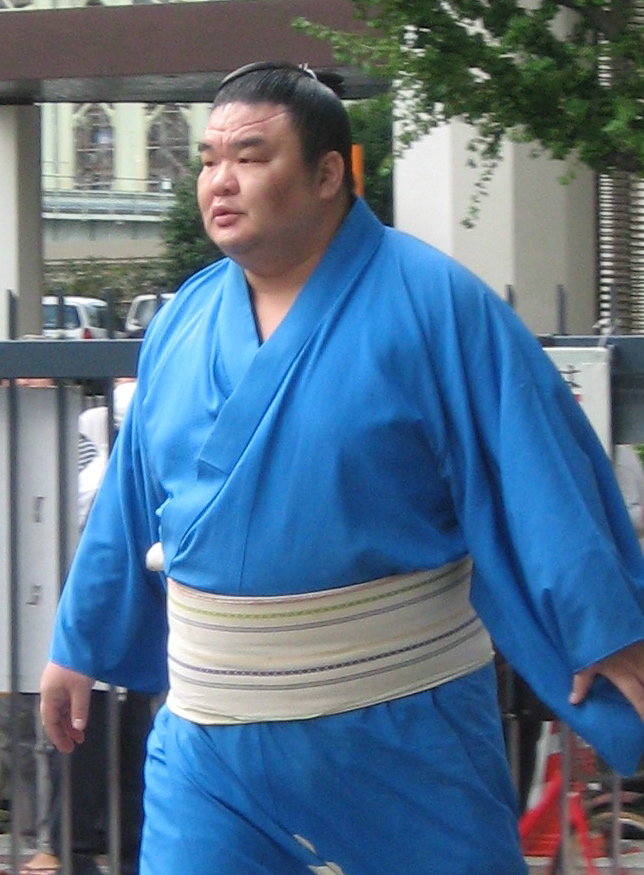

Personal information
- Native name: 玉春日 良二
- Born: Ryōji Matsumoto; January 7, 1972 (age 54) Seiyo, Ehime, Japan
- Height: 1.83 m (6 ft 0 in)
- Weight: 155 kg (342 lb)
- Website: http://www.tamakasuga.net/

Sport
- Sport: Sumo
- University team: Chuo University
- Retired: September 2008
- Heya: Kataonami
- Record: 603–636–39
- Debut: January 1994
- Highest rank: Sekiwake (July, 1997)
- Elder name: Kataonami
- Championships: 1 (Jūryō)
- Special Prizes: Outstanding Performance (1); Fighting Spirit (2); Technique (2)
- Gold Stars: 7 Takanohana II (3); Wakanohana III (2); Musashimaru; Akebono
- Updated on Sept 2008

Tamakasuga Ryōji (born January 7, 1972, as Ryōji Matsumoto) is a former sumo wrestler from Seiyo, Ehime Prefecture, Japan. A former amateur sumo champion, he made his professional debut in 1994 and reached a highest rank of sekiwake in 1997. He fought in the top makuuchi division for twelve years, won five special prizes and earned seven gold stars for defeating yokozuna. He retired in 2008 and is now a sumo coach. In February 2010 he took over the running of Kataonami stable.

== Career ==
He entered professional sumo in January 1994, after having practiced sumo at Chuo University. He joined Kataonami stable, adopting the shikona (fighting name) of Tamakasuga ("Tama", meaning "jewel", being a common prefix at his stable). Because of his achievements in amateur sumo he was allowed to enter at the bottom of the third makushita division, skipping the lower divisions. After steady but unspectacular progress he reached the jūryō division in March 1995 and was promoted to the top division five tournaments after that, in January 1996. He scored ten wins in his top division debut and was awarded the Fighting Spirit prize.

Tamakasuga had a long career in the top makuuchi division of sumo, earning seven gold stars for defeating yokozuna. He upset yokozuna Akebono, Wakanohana and Takanohana in three successive tournaments from September 1998 to January 1999. The highest rank he achieved was sekiwake, but he never achieved a kachi-koshi win–loss ratio as a san'yaku wrestler, managing only a 7–8 score in his sekiwake debut, and then a 6–9 as komusubi in the next tournament. Subsequently, he spent his career either as a rank and file maegashira, or fighting his way back into the top division, as he was demoted to jūryō a number of times.

Tamakasuga made something of a comeback in 2006, and was awarded the Technique Prize in July of that year, following his 11–4 performance which gave him his best ever top division score and a share of third place. His previous special prize, for Outstanding Performance, was in May 1997, 55 tournaments earlier. This is the longest ever gap between awards. He was promoted all the way up to maegashira 4 in September 2007, fighting the top rankers for the first time in several years. He remained in makuuchi until July 2008, where he was the oldest man in the top division, but could only manage three wins in that tournament and withdrew on the final day, citing a neck injury.

== Fighting style ==
Tamakasuga was a solidly oshi-sumo wrestler, relying on pushes to the opponent's chest as opposed to grabbing the mawashi. His most popular winning technique was oshi-dashi, a simple push-out. He also frequently employed pull-down moves such as hataki-komi and hiki-otoshi.

== Retirement from sumo ==
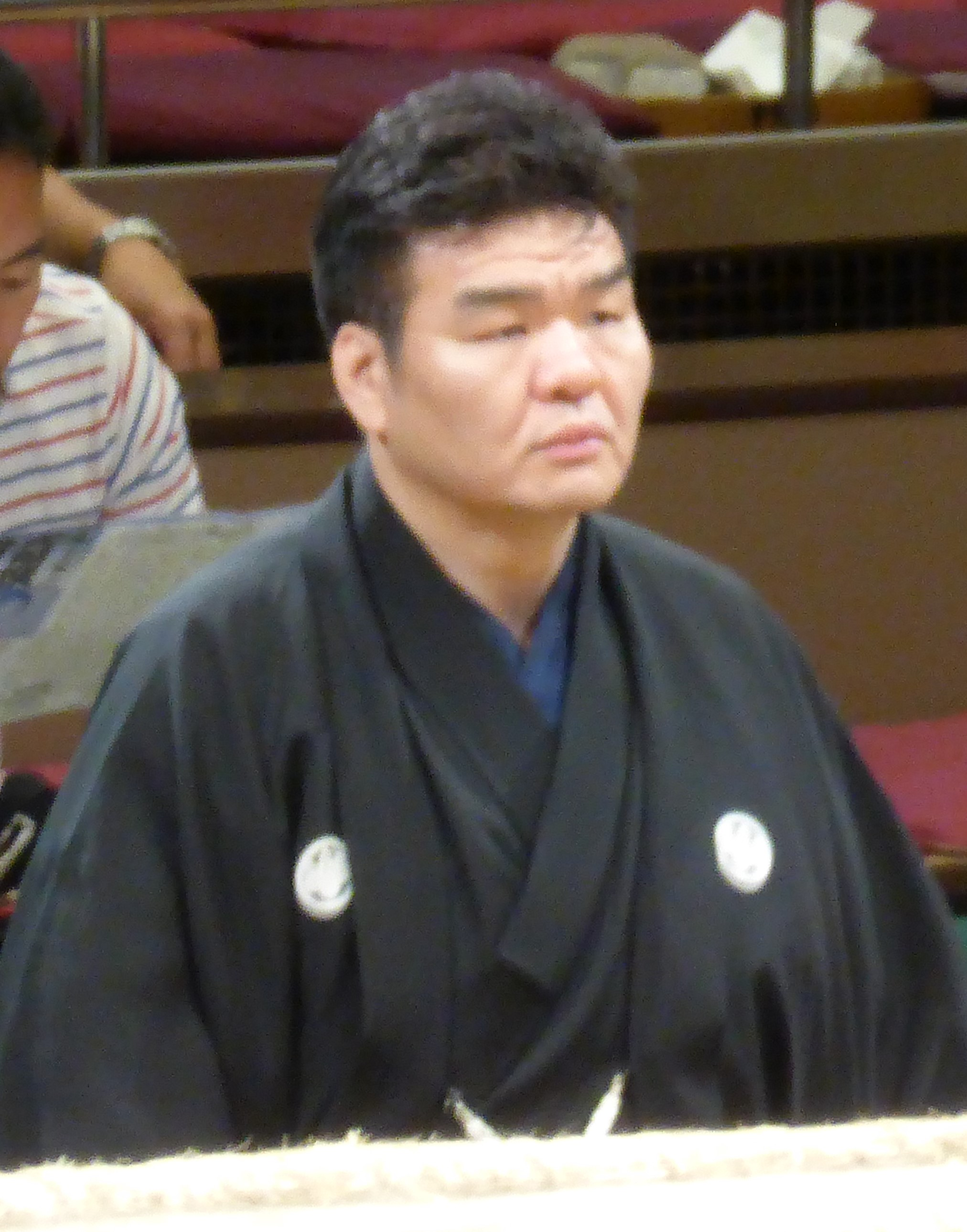
Working as a ringside judge, May 2014

He announced his retirement in September 2008, at the age of 36, after posting a losing record in that tournament. He remained in the sumo world as a coach at Kataonami stable, under the toshiyori (elder) name Tateyama-oyakata. His danpatsu-shiki, or official retirement ceremony, was held at the Ryōgoku Kokugikan on 30 May 2009. In February 2010 he swapped elder names with his old head coach (former sekiwake Tamanofuji) and took charge of the stable.

Tamakasuga has an asteroid named after him. Known as 8432 Tamakasuga, it was named by astronomers at an observatory in his home prefecture.

== Career record ==
Tamakasuga Ryōji
Year	January Hatsu basho, Tokyo	March Haru basho, Osaka	May Natsu basho, Tokyo	July Nagoya basho, Nagoya	September Aki basho, Tokyo	November Kyūshū basho, Fukuoka
1994	Makushita tsukedashi #60; 4–3	West Makushita #48; 4–3	East Makushita #36; 5–2	East Makushita #22; 5–2	West Makushita #13; 4–3	West Makushita #10; 5–2
1995	East Makushita #3; 6–1	West Jūryō #12; 9–6	West Jūryō #9; 8–7	East Jūryō #7; 9–6	East Jūryō #3; 8–7	West Jūryō #1; 10–5
1996	East Maegashira #16; 10–5; F	West Maegashira #5; 7–8	East Maegashira #6; 9–6; T	East Maegashira #1; 6–9	East Maegashira #3; 6–9	East Maegashira #5; 9–6
1997	East Maegashira #2; 5–10	East Maegashira #6; 10–5; F	East Maegashira #1; 8–7; O★	West Sekiwake #1; 7–8	West Komusubi #2; 6–9	East Maegashira #1; 4–11
1998	West Maegashira #6; 6–9	West Maegashira #9; 8–7	West Maegashira #4; 4–11	West Maegashira #10; 9–6	West Maegashira #3; 6–9 ★	West Maegashira #4; 8–7 ★
1999	West Maegashira #2; 5–10 ★	West Maegashira #4; 7–8	West Maegashira #5; 7–8	West Maegashira #6; 9–6	West Maegashira #1; 8–7 ★	East Maegashira #1; 3–12 ★
2000	East Maegashira #8; 8–7	East Maegashira #2; 5–10	West Maegashira #4; 9–6	West Komusubi #1; 2–13	East Maegashira #9; 7–8	East Maegashira #10; 8–7
2001	West Maegashira #5; 7–8	East Maegashira #7; 9–6	East Maegashira #4; 6–9	East Maegashira #7; 8–7	West Maegashira #3; 5–10 ★	East Maegashira #7; 6–9
2002	East Maegashira #9; 8–7	West Maegashira #7; 8–7	West Maegashira #5; 7–8	East Maegashira #6; 6–7–2	West Maegashira #8; 10–5	East Maegashira #3; 2–13
2003	East Maegashira #12; 0–5–10	West Jūryō #7; Sat out due to injury 0–0–15	West Jūryō #7; 12–3; Champion	East Maegashira #15; 7–8	East Jūryō #1; 10–5	East Maegashira #13; 6–9
2004	West Maegashira #16; 7–8	East Jūryō #2; 8–7	East Jūryō #1; 7–8	West Jūryō #1; 11–4	West Maegashira #14; 8–7	West Maegashira #13; 7–8
2005	West Maegashira #14; 7–8	East Maegashira #15; 7–8	East Maegashira #16; 8–7	East Maegashira #13; 0–3–12	West Jūryō #8; 11–4	East Jūryō #2; 5–10
2006	East Jūryō #6; 12–3	East Maegashira #15; 9–6	East Maegashira #10; 6–9	West Maegashira #12; 11–4; T	East Maegashira #4; 1–14	East Maegashira #14; 9–6
2007	East Maegashira #11; 9–6	West Maegashira #5; 4–11	East Maegashira #12; 5–10	West Maegashira #15; 8–7	East Maegashira #11; 8–7	East Maegashira #9; 8–7
2008	West Maegashira #5; 4–11	West Maegashira #10; 6–9	West Maegashira #12; 8–7	West Maegashira #11; 3–12	West Jūryō #2; Retired; 6–8	x
Record given as wins–losses–absences Top division champion Top division runner-up Retired Non-participation Jūryō Lower divisions Sanshō key: F=Fighting spirit; O=Outstanding performance; T=Technique Also shown: ★=Kinboshi; P=Playoff(s); Divisions: Makuuchi — Jūryō — Makushita — Sandanme — Jonidan — Jonokuchi Makuuchi ranks: Yokozuna — Ōzeki — Sekiwake — Komusubi — Maegashira

== See also ==
- Glossary of sumo terms
- List of sumo tournament second division champions
- List of past sumo wrestlers
- List of sumo elders
- List of sekiwake
