= Daizo Sumida =

Daizo Sumida (住田 代蔵; August 7, 1887 – December 30, 1961) was a Japanese American businessman.

== Early life ==
Daizo Sumida was born on August 7, 1887, to a farming family in what is now Aki District, Hiroshima, Japan. Sumida moved to Hawaiʻi in 1904, after his brother Tajiro started a company there.

== Career ==
Sumida was co-owner of Marumasa Soy Sauce, along with his brother Tajiro and nephew Shinzaburo Sumida; Marumasa Soy Sauce later became known as Diamond Shoyu. However, they were most notable for founding the Honolulu Sake Brewing Company. It was the first sake brewing company founded outside Japan. During prohibition the company sold ice. After prohibition ended, in the early 1930s, Honolulu Ice Co. Ltd. changed its name back to Honolulu Sake Brewery & Ice Co. Ltd. Daizo Sumida was the president at the time. This period of production was called their "golden age".

After the attack on Pearl Harbor both Daizo and Shinzaburo were incarcerated in several internment camps on the U.S. continent. After they were released, they restarted sake production.

In 1947, Daizo Sumida became the first president of the Honolulu Businessman's Association, previously known as the Japanese Chamber of Commerce. Sumida died on December 30, 1961, after having a stroke the previous summer. Sumida posthumously received the Order of the Sacred Treasure, fifth class in 1962. The medal was presented to his wife, Fusao Sumida.
