= Towanoyama Yoshimitsu =

Japanese sumo wrestler (born 1977)

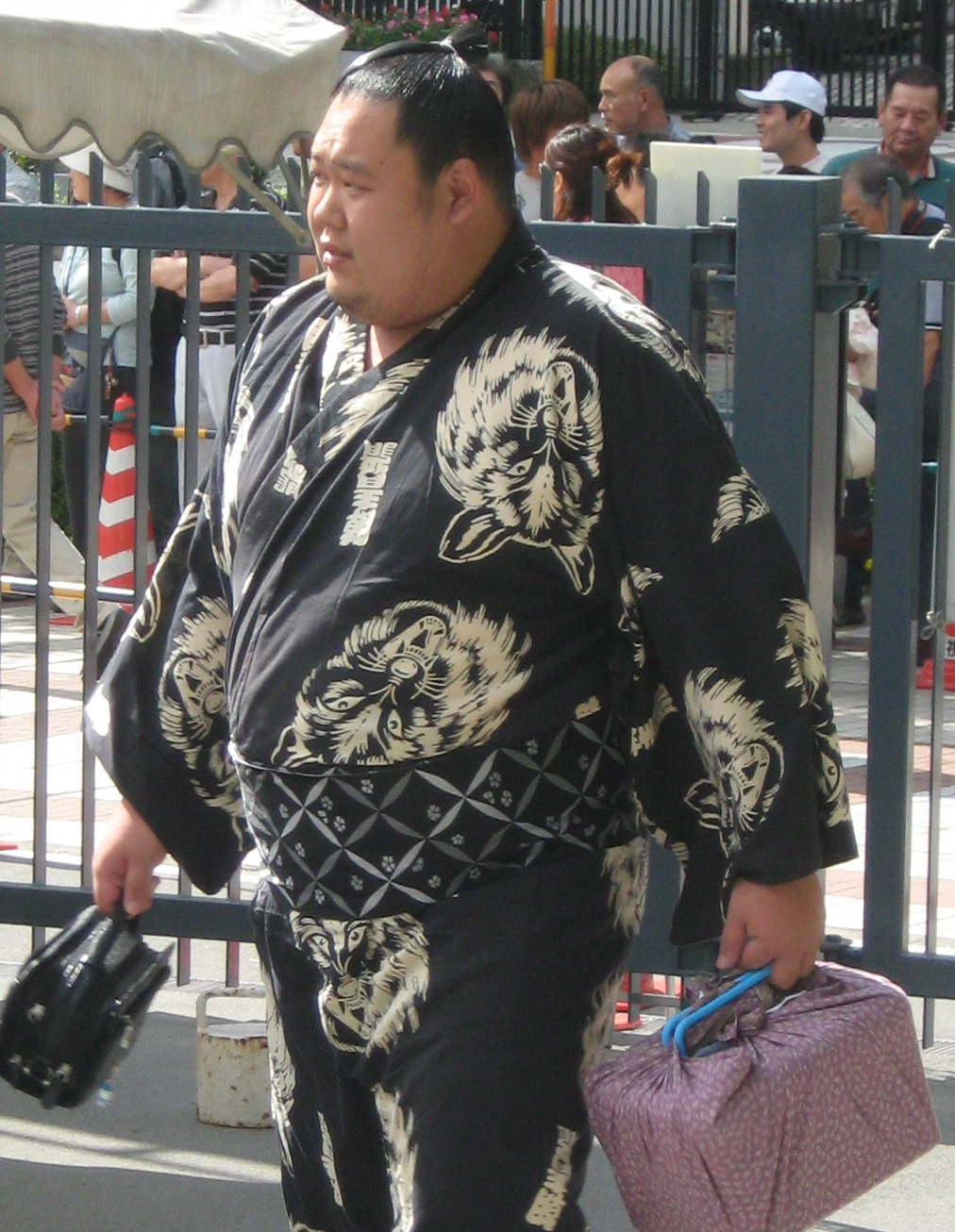

Personal information
- Native name: 鳥羽の山 喜充
- Born: Akihito Kobayashi; July 10, 1977 (age 49) Tokyo, Japan
- Height: 1.92 m (6 ft 3 1/2 in)
- Weight: 170 kg (370 lb; 27 st)

Sport
- Sport: Sumo
- Retired: January 2015
- Heya: Dewanoumi
- Record: 500-426-68
- Debut: November 1993
- Highest rank: Maegashira 13 (March 2002)
- Championships: 2 (Makushita)
- Updated on Jan 24, 2015

Towanoyama Yoshimitsu (born July 10, 1977 as Akihito Kobayashi) is a former sumo wrestler from Toshima, Tokyo, Japan. He made his professional debut in 1993. His highest rank was maegashira 13, achieved in March 2002. He had many injury problems and had perhaps the unluckiest (and shortest) top makuuchi division career of any wrestler in sumo, being injured before even fighting a match in the division. He is the only wrestler since the beginning of the Shōwa era in 1926 to have been ranked in the top division without winning any bouts there.

== Career ==
Towanoyama made his professional debut in November 1993, joining Dewanoumi stable straight from high school. At the time Dewanoumi stable was extremely strong and he had many powerful training partners. He served as a personal attendant to such top division men as Kushimaumi, Oginohana and Oginishiki. In March 1999 he won the makushita division championship with a perfect 7-0 record and earned promotion to the second highest jūryō division, becoming an elite sekitori wrestler. He suffered an injury to his right ankle which required surgery and affected his performances, resulting in demotion back to makushita after only four tournaments. However, in May 2001 he won his second makushita championship and returned to the second division. A strong 11-4 record in January 2002 earned him promotion to the top makuuchi division, alongside Shimotori.

At the time Towanoyama was the heaviest Japanese wrestler in sumo, weighing over 200 kilograms (440 lb). He was the highest ranked wrestler in his stable and was able to use his immense weight to good advantage. However, on the day of his first match in the top division in March 2002, he injured his knee in training and was forced to pull out of the tournament without participating in a single bout. This was to prove to be his only top division tournament. After winning only five bouts in the next tournament he fell to makushita once again. He was able to return to the jūryō division in November 2003, but on the tenth day of the March 2004 tournament, whilst trying to force a throwing move against Wakakosho, he fell badly and tore his patella tendon. He was hospitalised for four months, requiring transplant surgery for thigh tendons. He missed five consecutive tournaments, which meant he fell greatly in rank, ending up in the second lowest jonidan division.

After rehabilitation and weight training programs Towanoyama returned to the ring in March 2005 and made his way slowly back up the rankings, but never managed to regain sekitori status. A 6-1 score in May 2008 moved him up to Makushita 6 for July, his highest ranking since his 2004 injury. He produced a 5-2 score there, putting him on the brink of promotion back to jūryō, and he was even called up to face a jūryō opponent, Kaiho, in the following tournament - his first match against a sekitori in 27 basho. However, after two losing scores he slid down the makushita division again. In 2009 he rebounded again with three consecutive winning records. His results slowly begin to slip however, and over a four-year period he slowly dropped in the ranks of makushita being relegated to the lower sandanme division in May 2013, but achieving a winning record in that tournament and the next to gain promotion back to his mainstay of makushita. He announced his retirement after the January 2015 tournament, where he achieved his 500th career win but lost his six other bouts. He was the first wrestler to be ranked in the top division but not have any makuuchi wins since Kenrokuzan missed his only top division tournament in May 1926, before the Shōwa era.

== Fighting style ==
Towanoyama was a yotsu-sumo specialist, preferring grappling techniques to pushing or thrusting. His favoured grip on his opponent's mawashi is migi-yotsu, a left hand outside, right hand inside position. His most common winning kimarite was yori-kiri, a straightforward force out, which accounts for about 45 percent of his career victories.

== Career record ==
Towanoyama Yoshimitsu
Year	January Hatsu basho, Tokyo	March Haru basho, Osaka	May Natsu basho, Tokyo	July Nagoya basho, Nagoya	September Aki basho, Tokyo	November Kyūshū basho, Fukuoka
1993	x	x	x	x	x	(Maezumo)
1994	West Jonokuchi #53; 6–1	East Jonidan #126; 5–2	West Jonidan #71; 3–4	East Jonidan #93; 5–2	West Jonidan #49; 5–2	East Jonidan #11; 4–3
1995	West Sandanme #90; 4–3	West Sandanme #72; 5–2	West Sandanme #34; 3–4	East Sandanme #48; 3–4	West Sandanme #66; 5–2	East Sandanme #27; 3–4
1996	East Sandanme #42; 6–1	West Makushita #58; 3–4	East Sandanme #19; 5–2	East Makushita #56; 2–5	East Sandanme #22; 5–2	East Makushita #56; 4–3
1997	West Makushita #47; 5–2	West Makushita #27; 2–5	West Makushita #43; 4–3	East Makushita #33; 4–3	East Makushita #25; 5–2	East Makushita #13; 4–3
1998	West Makushita #9; 5–2	West Makushita #5; 5–2	East Makushita #2; 2–5	West Makushita #11; 3–4	West Makushita #18; 6–1	East Makushita #7; 3–4
1999	West Makushita #13; 4–3	West Makushita #10; 7–0; Champion	West Jūryō #12; 8–7	East Jūryō #9; 8–7	East Jūryō #8; 6–9	West Jūryō #11; 3–12
2000	West Makushita #8; 3–4	West Makushita #16; 3–4	East Makushita #21; 5–2	West Makushita #9; 5–2	West Makushita #4; 3–4	West Makushita #9; 3–4
2001	East Makushita #15; 5–2	East Makushita #7; 5–2	West Makushita #2; 7–0; Champion	East Jūryō #9; 7–8	West Jūryō #10; 8–7	East Jūryō #8; 9–6
2002	West Jūryō #3; 11–4	West Maegashira #13; Sat out due to injury 0–1–14	West Jūryō #9; 5–10	East Makushita #1; 1–6	West Makushita #19; 4–3	East Makushita #12; 5–2
2003	East Makushita #5; 4–3	East Makushita #3; 2–5	East Makushita #12; 4–3	West Makushita #7; 4–3	East Makushita #5; 5–2	East Jūryō #13; 9–6
2004	West Jūryō #5; 7–8	East Jūryō #8; 6–5–4	West Jūryō #11; Sat out due to injury 0–0–15	West Makushita #12; Sat out due to injury 0–0–7	West Makushita #52; Sat out due to injury 0–0–7	West Sandanme #32; Sat out due to injury 0–0–7
2005	West Sandanme #92; Sat out due to injury 0–0–7	West Jonidan #52; 1–2–4	West Jonidan #90; 6–1	East Jonidan #13; 5–2	East Sandanme #78; 5–2	West Sandanme #46; 6–1
2006	East Makushita #57; 1–4–2	East Sandanme #25; 4–2–1	West Sandanme #10; 5–2	East Makushita #50; 4–3	East Makushita #41; 4–3	East Makushita #32; 5–2
2007	East Makushita #19; 5–2	East Makushita #12; 3–4	East Makushita #18; 4–3	West Makushita #13; 4–3	East Makushita #9; 3–4	East Makushita #14; 2–5
2008	West Makushita #30; 3–4	West Makushita #36; 5–2	East Makushita #21; 6–1	West Makushita #6; 5–2	East Makushita #2; 3–4	West Makushita #3; 1–6
2009	East Makushita #27; 4–3	West Makushita #19; 4–3	West Makushita #13; 5–2	West Makushita #6; 3–4	West Makushita #11; 3–4	East Makushita #16; 4–3
2010	West Makushita #14; 4–3	West Makushita #9; 3–4	West Makushita #13; 4–3	West Makushita #8; 3–4	East Makushita #11; 2–5	East Makushita #22; 4–3
2011	West Makushita #18; 4–3	East Makushita #14; Tournament Cancelled; Match fixing investigation 0–0–0	East Makushita #14; 4–3	East Makushita #4; 2–5	West Makushita #7; 4–3	East Makushita #4; 2–5
2012	East Makushita #12; 3–4	West Makushita #17; 3–4	East Makushita #23; 5–2	West Makushita #11; 1–6	West Makushita #29; 4–3	East Makushita #23; 3–4
2013	West Makushita #28; 3–4	East Makushita #36; 1–6	East Sandanme #13; 4–3	East Sandanme #2; 5–2	East Makushita #47; 4–3	East Makushita #37; 4–3
2014	West Makushita #28; 4–3	West Makushita #22; 2–5	East Makushita #40; 3–4	East Makushita #47; 3–4	East Makushita #58; 3–4	West Sandanme #11; 5–2
2015	East Makushita #50; Retired; 1–6	x	x	x	x	x
Record given as wins–losses–absences Top division champion Top division runner-up Retired Lower divisions Non-participation Sanshō key: F=Fighting spirit; O=Outstanding performance; T=Technique Also shown: ★=Kinboshi; P=Playoff(s); Divisions: Makuuchi — Jūryō — Makushita — Sandanme — Jonidan — Jonokuchi Makuuchi ranks: Yokozuna — Ōzeki — Sekiwake — Komusubi — Maegashira

== See also ==
- Glossary of sumo terms
- List of past sumo wrestlers
