= Ganyu (disambiguation) =

Ganyu is a suburban district under the administration of Lianyungang, Jiangsu Province, China.

Ganyu may also refer to:

- Ganyu, Luzhou (甘雨镇), a township in Hejiang County, Sichuan, China
- Gan Chinese (赣语; pinyin: Gànyǔ), a branch of Chinese spoken primarily in and around Jiangxi
- Ganyū Kenji (born 1970), Japanese sumo wrestler
- Ganyu (感遇; pinyin: Gǎnyù; lit. 'Gratitude'), a poetry collection by Chen Zi'ang
- Ganyu, a character in 2020 video game Genshin Impact
