= Ōhinode Takaaki =

Japanese sumo wrestler

Personal information
- Native name: 大日ノ出 崇揚
- Born: Takaaki Nishida; 19 January 1970 (age 56) Chikusa, Hyōgo, Japan
- Height: 1.84 m (6 ft 1/2 in)
- Weight: 151 kg (333 lb)

Sport
- Sport: Sumo
- Retired: September, 2000
- Heya: Tatsunami
- Record: 262-243-34
- Debut: January, 1992
- Highest rank: Maegashira 9 (May, 1999)
- Updated on Sep. 2012

Ōhinode Takaaki (born 19 January 1970 as Takaaki Nishida) is a former sumo wrestler from Chikusa, Hyōgo, Japan.

== Career ==
He played baseball in elementary and junior high school. He was an amateur champion at Nihon University. He made his professional debut in January 1992, joining Tatsunami stable. His shikona means "great sunrise." He reached the juryo division in January 1997. It took him 30 tournaments to reach juryo from his professional debut. In January 1998, ranked at the top of the makushita division, five of his seven bouts were against juryo ranked wrestlers, a record. He was promoted back to juryo after this tournament. He reached the top makuuchi division in March 1999, shortly after his old stablemaster, ex-sekiwake Annenyama, had retired and been replaced as Tatsunami Oyakata by ex-komusubi Asahiyutaka. This was 43 tournaments after his debut, which at the time was the slowest amongst makushita tsukedashi entrants. By contrast, Miyabiyama, who made his top division debut in the same tournament, had begun as a makushita tsukedashi entrant just four tournaments earlier in July 1998. His highest rank was maegashira 9, which he achieved in May 1999. He retired from active competition in September 2000 due to a lung problem. Although this prevented him from doing sumo it did not affect his everyday life and he became a businessman upon leaving sumo.

== Fighting style ==
Ōhinode was a yotsu-sumo (grappling) specialist who preferred a migi-yotsu (left hand outside, right hand inside) grip on his opponent's mawashi. His most common winning kimarite was yori-kiri (force out).

== Career record ==
Ōhinode Takaaki
Year	January Hatsu basho, Tokyo	March Haru basho, Osaka	May Natsu basho, Tokyo	July Nagoya basho, Nagoya	September Aki basho, Tokyo	November Kyūshū basho, Fukuoka
1992	Makushita tsukedashi #60; 4–3	East Makushita #51; 4–3	West Makushita #39; 4–3	East Makushita #28; 5–2	East Makushita #17; 4–3	East Makushita #12; 3–4
1993	West Makushita #19; 4–3	West Makushita #14; 2–5	West Makushita #32; 3–4	East Makushita #40; 4–3	West Makushita #31; 4–3	West Makushita #23; 5–2
1994	East Makushita #13; 6–1	East Makushita #4; 3–4	East Makushita #10; 4–3	West Makushita #6; 3–4	East Makushita #11; 4–3	West Makushita #6; 4–3
1995	West Makushita #2; 2–5	East Makushita #16; 4–3	East Makushita #12; 3–4	East Makushita #19; 3–4	East Makushita #27; 6–1	East Makushita #11; 4–3
1996	East Makushita #6; 0–2–5	East Makushita #41; Sat out due to injury 0–0–7	East Makushita #41; 4–3	East Makushita #32; 6–1–P	West Makushita #13; 5–2	East Makushita #6; 6–1
1997	West Jūryō #12; 8–7	East Jūryō #10; 8–7	East Jūryō #7; 7–8	West Jūryō #9; 9–6	East Jūryō #4; 5–10	East Jūryō #9; 5–10
1998	East Makushita #1; 4–3	West Jūryō #12; 9–6	West Jūryō #7; 7–8	East Jūryō #11; 9–6	West Jūryō #6; 8–7	East Jūryō #3; 8–7
1999	East Jūryō #1; 8–7	West Maegashira #13; 9–6	West Maegashira #9; 6–9	East Maegashira #14; 7–8	East Maegashira #15; 8–7	East Maegashira #13; 8–7
2000	West Maegashira #12; 4–11	East Jūryō #4; 6–9	East Jūryō #7; 6–9	East Jūryō #10; Sat out due to injury 0–0–15	West Makushita #11; Retired; 0–0–7	x
Record given as wins–losses–absences Top division champion Top division runner-up Retired Lower divisions Non-participation Sanshō key: F=Fighting spirit; O=Outstanding performance; T=Technique Also shown: ★=Kinboshi; P=Playoff(s); Divisions: Makuuchi — Jūryō — Makushita — Sandanme — Jonidan — Jonokuchi Makuuchi ranks: Yokozuna — Ōzeki — Sekiwake — Komusubi — Maegashira

== See also ==
- Glossary of sumo terms
- List of past sumo wrestlers
