= Hayateumi Hidehito =

Japanese politician

Personal information
- Native name: 追風海 英飛人
- Born: Naohito Saitō; July 5, 1975 (age 51) Aomori, Japan
- Height: 1.84 m (6 ft 1/2 in)
- Weight: 124 kg (273 lb)

Sport
- Sport: Sumo
- University team: Nihon University
- Retired: January, 2006
- Heya: Tomozuna → Oitekaze
- Record: 281-223-136
- Debut: March, 1998
- Highest rank: Sekiwake (November, 2000)
- Championships: 1 (Jūryō)
- Special Prizes: Technique (1)
- Updated on June 2020

Hayateumi Hidehito (born July 5, 1975 as Naohito Saitō) is a former sumo wrestler from Aomori, Japan. His highest rank was sekiwake. He is now a Liberal Democratic Party politician.

== Career ==
Hidehito was born in Itayanagi, Kitatsugaru District, and was an amateur sumo champion at Nihon University where he held the "College Yokozuna" title. Given makushita tsukedashi, or promising amateur status, he made his professional debut in the third makushita division in March 1998. He joined Tomozuna stable, but soon after followed Oitekaze Oyakata (the former Daishōyama) to the newly established Oitekaze stable. He reached the second jūryō division in January 1999 and made his debut in the top makuuchi division in March 2000. In September 2000 he scored nine wins, winning the Gino-sho award and promotion to sekiwake. He had to pull out of the November 2000 tournament with an injury and never made the sanyaku ranks again.

He is one of the few wrestlers whose only tournament in sanyaku was at sekiwake rather than komusubi (along with Kotetsuyama and Hokutoriki). Hayateumi had persistent injuries which prevented him from realizing his true potential and forced him back down to the lower divisions. He announced his retirement in January 2006 at the rank of makushita 49. In all he had missed all or part of 12 of his 48 career tournaments through injury.

== Retirement from sumo ==
Hayateumi had his danpatsu-shiki, or official retirement ceremony, in October 2006. He chose not to stay with the Sumo Association as an elder and has left the sumo world. He is now a Liberal Democratic Party politician, and was elected to the Aomori Prefectural Assembly representing Kitatsugaru District in a by-election in September 2014, winning re-election in 2015 and 2019.

== Personal life ==
He is married to Endo Ako, who already had three children of her own. They have since had another child together. Endo was previously engaged to Mitoizumi.

== Fighting style ==
Hayateumi was a yotsu-sumo wrestler, who preferred fighting on the mawashi to pushing his opponents, and his most common winning kimarite was yori-kiri, a simple force out. His favourite grip was migi-yotsu, with his right hand inside and left hand outside his opponent's arms. He was known for occasionally leaping in the air at the tachi-ai or initial charge, a very unconventional move.

== Career record ==
Hayateumi Hidehito
Year	January Hatsu basho, Tokyo	March Haru basho, Osaka	May Natsu basho, Tokyo	July Nagoya basho, Nagoya	September Aki basho, Tokyo	November Kyūshū basho, Fukuoka
1998	x	Makushita tsukedashi #60; 6–1	East Makushita #32; 5–2	East Makushita #22; 6–1	West Makushita #7; 4–3	West Makushita #5; 6–1
1999	East Jūryō #13; 6–2–7	East Makushita #2; Sat out due to injury 0–0–7	East Makushita #2; 5–2	East Jūryō #13; 10–5–PP	West Jūryō #8; 12–3; Champion	West Jūryō #1; 8–7
2000	East Jūryō #1; 12–3	West Maegashira #10; 7–8	East Maegashira #11; 9–6	East Maegashira #5; 8–7	West Maegashira #2; 9–6; T	West Sekiwake #1; 4–5–6
2001	West Maegashira #2; Sat out due to injury 0–0–15	West Maegashira #2; 6–9	West Maegashira #4; 9–6	East Maegashira #1; 4–11	East Maegashira #7; 6–9	West Maegashira #10; 8–2–5
2002	West Maegashira #6; Sat out due to injury 0–0–15	West Maegashira #6; 0–2–13	East Jūryō #2; 9–6	East Maegashira #13; 6–9	West Jūryō #1; 3–11–1	West Jūryō #9; Sat out due to injury 0–0–15
2003	West Jūryō #9; 8–7	West Jūryō #6; 8–7	East Jūryō #5; 9–6	West Jūryō #3; 4–11	East Jūryō #9; 10–5	West Jūryō #4; 9–6
2004	West Maegashira #17; 7–8	West Jūryō #2; 12–3–P	West Maegashira #11; 8–7	East Maegashira #10; 7–8	East Maegashira #12; 8–7	East Maegashira #11; 9–6
2005	East Maegashira #7; 8–7	West Maegashira #3; Sat out due to injury 0–0–15	West Maegashira #14; 3–4–8	East Jūryō #6; Sat out due to injury 0–0–15	West Makushita #5; 3–4	West Makushita #8; Sat out due to injury 0–0–7
2006	East Makushita #49; Retired; 0–0–1	x	x	x	x	x
Record given as wins–losses–absences Top division champion Top division runner-up Retired Lower divisions Non-participation Sanshō key: F=Fighting spirit; O=Outstanding performance; T=Technique Also shown: ★=Kinboshi; P=Playoff(s); Divisions: Makuuchi — Jūryō — Makushita — Sandanme — Jonidan — Jonokuchi Makuuchi ranks: Yokozuna — Ōzeki — Sekiwake — Komusubi — Maegashira

== See also ==
- List of sumo tournament second division champions
- Glossary of sumo terms
- List of past sumo wrestlers
- List of sekiwake
