= Kinkaiyama Ryū =

Sumo wrestler

Personal information
- Native name: 金開山 龍
- Born: Ryusui Kin; 7 January 1976 (age 50) Ōmura, Nagasaki, Japan
- Height: 1.84 m (6 ft 1/2 in)
- Weight: 156 kg (344 lb)

Sport
- Sport: Sumo
- Retired: May, 2006
- Heya: Dewanoumi
- Record: 469-453-35
- Debut: March, 1991
- Highest rank: Maegashira 6 (November, 2003)
- Elder name: Takasaki
- Championships: 3 (Jūryō); 1 (Makushita)
- Updated on Sep. 2012

Kinkaiyama Ryū (born 7 January 1976 as Ryusui Kin) is a former sumo wrestler from Ōmura, Nagasaki, Japan. He made his professional debut in March 1991, and reached the top division in July 1998. His highest rank was maegashira 6.

He is of Korean heritage, became a naturalized citizen in 2000 while still active, changing his name to Matsuyama Ryusui, and married in February 2005. He retired in May 2006 to become an elder in the Japan Sumo Association, as of 2026 under the name Takasaki.

He was responsible for the "Ozumo Beyond 2020 Tournament" held in the Ryogoku Kokugikan in October 2017 to increase awareness of sumo among minority groups such as foreigners and people with disabilities, in preparation for the Tokyo 2020 Olympics.

== Career record ==
Kinkaiyama Ryū
Year	January Hatsu basho, Tokyo	March Haru basho, Osaka	May Natsu basho, Tokyo	July Nagoya basho, Nagoya	September Aki basho, Tokyo	November Kyūshū basho, Fukuoka
1991	x	(Maezumo)	East Jonokuchi #14; 4–3	East Jonidan #114; 4–3	West Jonidan #83; 3–4	West Jonidan #96; 4–3
1992	West Jonidan #70; 3–4	East Jonidan #89; 5–2	East Jonidan #47; 4–3	East Jonidan #22; 2–5	East Jonidan #57; 6–1	West Sandanme #94; 5–2
1993	East Sandanme #57; 2–5	West Sandanme #86; 3–4	West Jonidan #4; 5–2	East Sandanme #67; 6–1	East Sandanme #17; 4–3	West Sandanme #4; 2–5
1994	West Sandanme #28; 3–4	East Sandanme #45; 3–4	East Sandanme #65; 6–1	East Sandanme #15; 4–3	East Sandanme #2; 3–4	East Sandanme #20; 4–3
1995	East Sandanme #8; 2–5	East Sandanme #31; 6–1	East Makushita #52; 4–3	East Makushita #42; 4–3	West Makushita #34; 1–6	West Makushita #55; 6–1
1996	East Makushita #28; 2–5	West Makushita #50; 3–4	West Sandanme #8; 3–4	East Sandanme #24; 5–2	West Makushita #56; 3–4	East Sandanme #10; 6–1
1997	East Makushita #39; 4–3	West Makushita #29; 4–3	West Makushita #21; 4–3	West Makushita #15; 6–1	East Makushita #5; 4–3	West Makushita #3; 4–3
1998	West Jūryō #13; 12–3; Champion	West Jūryō #3; 9–6	East Jūryō #2; 9–6	East Maegashira #15; 7–8	East Jūryō #1; 8–7	East Jūryō #1; 8–7
1999	West Maegashira #14; 4–11	East Jūryō #3; 6–9	West Jūryō #5; 10–5	East Jūryō #2; 10–5–PP; Champion	East Maegashira #13; 6–9	East Jūryō #1; 10–5
2000	East Maegashira #14; 6–9	West Jūryō #2; 10–5	West Maegashira #10; 5–10	West Maegashira #14; 8–7	East Maegashira #13; 5–10	West Jūryō #1; 12–3; Champion
2001	East Maegashira #11; 6–9	East Maegashira #13; 3–5–7	West Jūryō #6; Sat out due to injury 0–0–15	West Jūryō #6; 2–13	West Makushita #4; 4–3	East Makushita #3; 3–4
2002	West Makushita #7; Sat out due to injury 0–0–7	West Makushita #7; 3–4	West Makushita #11; 5–2	East Makushita #4; 6–1–PP; Champion	West Jūryō #10; 11–4–P	West Jūryō #4; 8–7
2003	East Jūryō #1; 9–6	East Maegashira #12; 5–10	East Jūryō #2; 8–7	West Maegashira #15; 9–6	East Maegashira #9; 8–7	East Maegashira #6; 6–9
2004	West Maegashira #9; 8–7	West Maegashira #7; 4–11	West Maegashira #13; 8–7	West Maegashira #12; 4–11	East Jūryō #1; 4–11	West Jūryō #7; 8–7
2005	West Jūryō #5; 6–9	West Jūryō #7; 6–9	West Jūryō #9; 7–8	West Jūryō #10; 5–10	West Makushita #1; 3–4	East Makushita #5; 4–3
2006	West Makushita #1; 2–5	East Makushita #8; 3–4	East Makushita #13; Retired; 0–1–6	x	x	x
Record given as wins–losses–absences Top division champion Top division runner-up Retired Lower divisions Non-participation Sanshō key: F=Fighting spirit; O=Outstanding performance; T=Technique Also shown: ★=Kinboshi; P=Playoff(s); Divisions: Makuuchi — Jūryō — Makushita — Sandanme — Jonidan — Jonokuchi Makuuchi ranks: Yokozuna — Ōzeki — Sekiwake — Komusubi — Maegashira

== See also ==
- Glossary of sumo terms
- List of sumo tournament second division champions
- List of past sumo wrestlers
- List of sumo elders
