= Tōki Susumu =

Japanese sumo wrestler

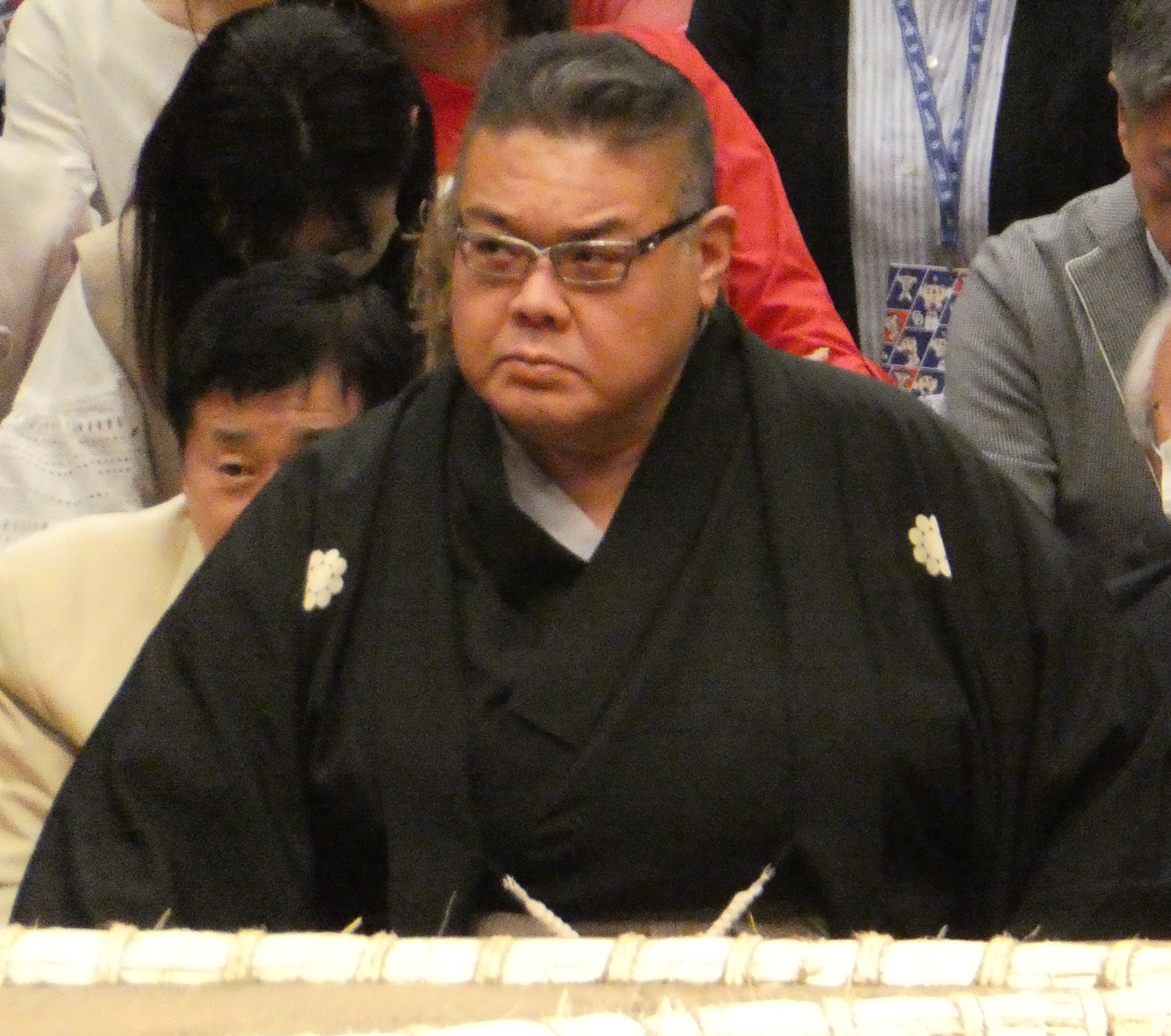

Personal information
- Native name: 闘牙 進
- Born: Jun Tamaki; July 4, 1974 (age 52) Chiba, Japan
- Height: 1.89 m (6 ft 2 1/2 in)
- Weight: 165 kg (364 lb; 26.0 st)

Sport
- Sport: Sumo
- Retired: May 2006
- Heya: Takasago
- Record: 511-518-24
- Debut: January 1991
- Highest rank: Komusubi (September 2003)
- Elder name: Sendagawa
- Championships: 1 (Jūryō); 1 (Makushita); 1 (Sandanme)
- Updated on August 2007

Tōki Susumu (born July 4, 1974 as Jun Tamaki) is a former sumo wrestler from Ichikawa, Chiba Prefecture, Japan. His highest rank was komusubi. He wrestled for Takasago stable and was a sumo coach at two other stables until his retirement in 2023.

== Career ==
Tōki began his career in January 1991 after joining the Takasago stable. Just like former sekiwake Takamiyama, who was a member of the same stable during the 1970s and 80s, Tōki wore long sideburns as a distinctive feature.

On his slow rise through the ranks he won both the fourth- and third-division championship once, the latter in May 1997 by winning out in a seven-way playoff. In March 1998 he would fail to secure the second-division championship, losing to Kushimaumi in a playoff. Nonetheless, Tōki managed to enter the top makuuchi division for the first time and quickly became a regular maegashira, although his results were not sufficient to make him a san'yaku wrestler (although he was a komusubi for one tournament in September 2003, he could not retain this rank). He was not a great challenge to the top wrestlers in his makuuchi days, losing every bout he fought against both Musashimaru and Takanohana. He never managed to defeat a yokozuna or win a special prize.

On December 18, 2000 in Osaka Tōki was behind the wheel of a car which hit a pedestrian and killed her. He should not have been driving at all because the Sumo Association had banned all wrestlers from doing so following a previous incident. Tōki was told by the Sumo Association not to leave his house for two months, and given a 20 percent pay cut. He withdrew from the January 2001 tournament as a result, and fell to the jūryō division. This left the Takasago stable without any top division wrestlers for the first time in its 123-year history. However, Tōki was immediately promoted back to makuuchi following his return to the ring in March 2001.

In 2004, Tōki suffered a shoulder injury which eventually led to him dropping to jūryō once more. He did not succeed in making a sustained comeback to makuuchi, although he managed to return temporarily twice. He suffered increasingly from back problems related to spinal stenosis, which was the reason why he missed six days of the January 2006 tournament. This also reduced the power of his pushes and thrusts to his opponents. After a disastrous make-koshi in March, Tōki was demoted to makushita in May 2006 and announced his retirement on the day the tournament started.

== Fighting style ==
Tōki relied almost exclusively on slapping and pushing techniques, making his style very predictable, yet often surprisingly successful. However, he was very vulnerable when his opponents got hold of his mawashi. He won only eight matches in his career by yori-kiri, or force out, and lost 132. His most common winning kimarite were the slap down, hataki-komi, and the pull down, hiki-otoshi.

== Retirement from sumo ==
Tōki had his official retirement ceremony on January 27, 2007 and worked as a coach at Kokonoe stable. Until January 2010 he used the name Sanoyama Oyakata. However, the elder stock is owned by the stable's former ōzeki Chiyotaikai, and upon Chiyotaikai's retirement Tōki switched to the Asakayama name owned by Kaiō. He changed once again, to Oshiogawa Oyakata, in September 2010. In 2012 he became Sendagawa Oyakata and in the same year left Kokonoe stable to take up a coaching role at Nishikido stable.

The Japan Sumo Association announced Tōki's retirement on 7 September 2023. At the time of his retirement he was working in various departments within the Sumo Association, including as a ringside judge.

== Career record ==
Tōki Susumu
Year	January Hatsu basho, Tokyo	March Haru basho, Osaka	May Natsu basho, Tokyo	July Nagoya basho, Nagoya	September Aki basho, Tokyo	November Kyūshū basho, Fukuoka
1991	(Maezumo)	West Jonokuchi #33; 3–4	East Jonidan #136; 3–4	West Jonokuchi #2; 5–2	East Jonidan #89; 3–4	East Jonidan #104; 6–1
1992	East Jonidan #29; 3–4	East Jonidan #48; 6–1	East Sandanme #87; 1–6	East Jonidan #24; 5–2	East Sandanme #89; 2–5	West Jonidan #22; 4–3
1993	West Sandanme #100; 6–1	East Sandanme #44; 2–5	West Sandanme #72; 4–3	West Sandanme #49; 2–5	West Sandanme #74; 5–2	East Sandanme #45; 4–3
1994	West Sandanme #30; 3–4	West Sandanme #47; 7–0; Champion	East Makushita #30; 2–5	West Makushita #46; 3–4	West Sandanme #2; 2–5	West Sandanme #26; 3–4
1995	East Sandanme #43; 6–1	East Makushita #58; 4–3	West Makushita #46; 5–2	East Makushita #31; 3–4	East Makushita #42; 4–3	East Makushita #33; 5–2
1996	East Makushita #18; 3–4	West Makushita #29; 4–3	East Makushita #22; 3–4	East Makushita #35; 4–3	West Makushita #24; 4–3	West Makushita #17; 4–3
1997	East Makushita #11; 5–2	West Makushita #4; 5–2	East Makushita #1; 6–1–PPP; Champion	East Jūryō #11; 6–9	East Makushita #2; 6–1	West Jūryō #11; 8–7
1998	West Jūryō #9; 10–5	West Jūryō #2; 12–3–P	East Maegashira #15; 7–8	West Jūryō #1; 9–6	East Maegashira #15; 10–5	East Maegashira #4; 7–8
1999	West Maegashira #4; 7–8	East Maegashira #5; 6–9	East Maegashira #8; 9–6	West Maegashira #2; 7–8	East Maegashira #3; 6–9	West Maegashira #5; 9–6
2000	East Maegashira #1; 4–11	West Maegashira #7; 7–8	East Maegashira #9; 9–6	East Maegashira #2; 6–9	West Maegashira #4; 6–9	West Maegashira #5; 6–9
2001	West Maegashira #8; Suspended; 0–0–15	East Jūryō #4; 10–5–P	East Maegashira #13; 11–4	West Maegashira #3; 6–9	West Maegashira #6; 7–8	West Maegashira #7; 8–7
2002	West Maegashira #2; 6–9	East Maegashira #5; 8–7	West Maegashira #1; 4–11	East Maegashira #7; 8–7	West Maegashira #2; 4–11	East Maegashira #7; 9–6
2003	West Maegashira #2; 4–11	West Maegashira #6; 5–10	East Maegashira #11; 10–5	West Maegashira #4; 10–5	East Komusubi #1; 7–8	East Maegashira #2; 9–6
2004	East Maegashira #1; 1–11–3	East Maegashira #12; 8–7	West Maegashira #10; 4–11	West Maegashira #16; 6–9	East Jūryō #2; 8–7	East Maegashira #17; 2–13
2005	East Jūryō #6; 9–6	East Jūryō #2; 8–7	West Maegashira #17; 6–9	East Jūryō #2; 6–9	East Jūryō #5; 3–12	West Jūryō #13; 12–3; Champion
2006	East Jūryō #3; 4–5–6	East Jūryō #10; 2–13	West Makushita #5; Retired –	x	x	x
Record given as wins–losses–absences Top division champion Top division runner-up Retired Lower divisions Non-participation Sanshō key: F=Fighting spirit; O=Outstanding performance; T=Technique Also shown: ★=Kinboshi; P=Playoff(s); Divisions: Makuuchi — Jūryō — Makushita — Sandanme — Jonidan — Jonokuchi Makuuchi ranks: Yokozuna — Ōzeki — Sekiwake — Komusubi — Maegashira

== See also ==
- List of sumo tournament second division champions
- Glossary of sumo terms
- List of past sumo wrestlers
- List of sumo elders
- List of komusubi
