= 1999 in sumo =

In 1999, Musashimaru firmly established his position as the dominant sumo wrestler of the year. Born in American Samoa and raised in Hawaii, Musashimaru became only the second foreign-born wrestler in history to achieve the highest rank of yokozuna or grand champion, in May 1999. He finished the year having won four tournaments, a rare accomplishment.

The following are the events in professional sumo in Japan during 1999.

== Tournaments ==
=== Hatsu basho ===
Ryogoku Kokugikan, Tokyo, 10 January – 24 January

1999 Hatsu basho results - Makuuchi Division
W		L		A	East			Rank	West			W		L		A
8	-	7	-	0		(Japan)	**Takanohana**	Y		(Japan)	**Wakanohana**	13	-	2	-	0
0	-	0	-	15	ø	(United States)	Akebono	Y	ø							
8	-	7	-	0		(United States)	**Musashimaru**	O		(Japan)	Takanonami	6	-	9	-	0
13	-	2	-	0		(Japan)	**Chiyotaikai***	S		(Japan)	**Kotonowaka**	8	-	7	-	0
					ø			S		(Japan)	**Musōyama**	10	-	5	-	0
8	-	7	-	0		(Japan)	**Dejima**	K		(Japan)	**Tochiazuma**	9	-	6	-	0
6	-	9	-	0		(Japan)	Kotonishiki	K	ø							
9	-	6	-	0		(Japan)	**Kaiō**	M1		(Japan)	Tosanoumi	7	-	8	-	0
8	-	7	-	0		(Japan)	**Takatōriki**	M2		(Japan)	Tamakasuga	5	-	10	-	0
11	-	4	-	0		(Japan)	**Akinoshima**	M3		(Japan)	Aogiyama	4	-	11	-	0
5	-	10	-	0		(Japan)	Minatofuji	M4		(Japan)	Tōki	7	-	8	-	0
4	-	11	-	0		(Japan)	Tokitsuumi	M5		(Japan)	Kotoryū	5	-	10	-	0
6	-	9	-	0		(Japan)	Tochinowaka	M6	ø	(Japan)	Wakanosato	0	-	0	-	15
8	-	7	-	0		(Japan)	**Terao**	M7		(Japan)	**Higonoumi**	8	-	7	-	0
9	-	6	-	0		(Japan)	**Shikishima**	M8		(Mongolia)	**Kyokushūzan**	9	-	6	-	0
8	-	7	-	0		(Japan)	**Tochinonada**	M9		(Japan)	Kaihō	6	-	9	-	0
7	-	8	-	0		(Japan)	Gojōrō	M10		(Japan)	**Ganyū**	8	-	7	-	0
6	-	9	-	0		(Japan)	Wakanojō	M11		(Japan)	**Mitoizumi**	8	-	7	-	0
8	-	7	-	0		(Japan)	**Oginishiki**	M12		(Japan)	**Hamanoshima**	6	-	9	-	0
4	-	9	-	0	ø	(Japan)	Asahiyutaka	M13		(Japan)	Asanosho	6	-	9	-	0
10	-	5	-	0		(Japan)	**Chiyotenzan**	M14		(Japan)	Kinkaiyama	4	-	11	-	0
4	-	8	-	3	ø	(Japan)	Dewaarashi	M15	ø							

ø - Indicates a pull-out or absent rank
**winning record in bold**
**Yusho Winner**
***Won Playoff**

=== Haru basho ===
Osaka Prefectural Gymnasium, Osaka, 14 March – 28 March

1999 Haru basho results - Makuuchi Division
W		L		A	East			Rank	West			W		L		A
5	-	5	-	5	ø	(Japan)	Takanohana	Y	ø	(Japan)	**Wakanohana**	8	-	3	-	4
0	-	0	-	15	ø	(United States)	Akebono	Y	ø							
13	-	2	-	0		(United States)	**Musashimaru**	O	ø	(Japan)	Chiyotaikai	3	-	8	-	4
					ø			O		(Japan)	**Takanonami**	12	-	3	-	0
1	-	2	-	12	ø	(Japan)	Musōyama	S		(Japan)	Kotonowaka	6	-	9	-	0
8	-	7	-	0		(Japan)	**Tochiazuma**	K		(Japan)	**Dejima**	9	-	6	-	0
11	-	4	-	0		(Japan)	**Akinoshima**	K		(Japan)	**Kaiō**	10	-	5	-	0
8	-	7	-	0		(Japan)	**Takatōriki**	M1		(Japan)	Kotonishiki	6	-	9	-	0
8	-	7	-	0		(Japan)	**Tosanoumi**	M2		(Japan)	Shikishima	1	-	14	-	0
7	-	8	-	0		(Mongolia)	Kyokushūzan	M3		(Japan)	Terao	5	-	10	-	0
6	-	9	-	0		(Japan)	Higonoumi	M4		(Japan)	Tamakasuga	7	-	8	-	0
6	-	9	-	0		(Japan)	Tōki	M5		(Japan)	**Tochinonada**	9	-	6	-	0
6	-	9	-	0		(Japan)	Minatofuji	M6		(Japan)	Wakanosato	5	-	10	-	0
9	-	6	-	0		(Japan)	**Miyabiyama**	M7		(Japan)	Ganyū	5	-	10	-	0
8	-	7	-	0		(Japan)	**Aogiyama**	M8		(Japan)	**Tochinowaka**	8	-	7	-	0
9	-	6	-	0		(Japan)	**Chiyotenzan**	M9		(Japan)	Hamanoshima	6	-	9	-	0
5	-	10	-	0		(Japan)	Mitoizumi	M10		(Japan)	**Kotoryū**	8	-	7	-	0
7	-	8	-	0		(Japan)	Oginishiki	M11		(Japan)	**Tokitsuumi**	9	-	6	-	0
6	-	9	-	0		(Japan)	Gojōrō	M12		(Japan)	**Kaihō**	8	-	7	-	0
6	-	9	-	0		(Japan)	Asanowaka	M13		(Japan)	**Ōhinode**	9	-	6	-	0
8	-	7	-	0		(Japan)	**Wakanojō**	M14		(Japan)	**Asanosho**	8	-	7	-	0

ø - Indicates a pull-out or absent rank
**winning record in bold**
**Yusho Winner**

=== Natsu basho ===
Ryogoku Kokugikan, Tokyo, 9 May – 23 May

1999 Natsu basho results - Makuuchi Division
W		L		A	East			Rank	West			W		L		A
0	-	0	-	15	ø	(Japan)	Takanohana	Y	ø	(Japan)	Wakanohana	3	-	5	-	7
11	-	4	-	0		(United States)	**Akebono**	Y	ø							
13	-	2	-	0		(United States)	**Musashimaru**	O		(Japan)	**Takanonami**	9	-	6	-	0
					ø			O	ø	(Japan)	Chiyotaikai	0	-	0	-	15
6	-	9	-	0		(Japan)	Akinoshima	S		(Japan)	**Kaiō**	12	-	3	-	0
11	-	4	-	0		(Japan)	**Dejima**	S	ø							
10	-	5	-	0		(Japan)	**Tochiazuma**	K		(Japan)	Takatōriki	5	-	10	-	0
8	-	7	-	0		(Japan)	**Tosanoumi**	M1		(Japan)	Kotonowaka	2	-	13	-	0
3	-	9	-	3	ø	(Japan)	Tochinonada	M2		(Japan)	Miyabiyama	6	-	9	-	0
9	-	6	-	0		(Japan)	**Chiyotenzan**	M3		(Japan)	**Kotonishiki**	9	-	6	-	0
5	-	10	-	0		(Mongolia)	Kyokushūzan	M4		(Japan)	Aogiyama	7	-	8	-	0
5	-	10	-	0		(Japan)	Tochinowaka	M5		(Japan)	Tamakasuga	7	-	8	-	0
0	-	0	-	15	ø	(Japan)	Musōyama	M6		(Japan)	Tokitsuumi	4	-	11	-	0
8	-	7	-	0		(Japan)	**Higonoumi**	M7		(Japan)	Terao	6	-	9	-	0
9	-	6	-	0		(Japan)	**Tōki**	M8		(Japan)	Kotoryū	5	-	10	-	0
8	-	7	-	0		(Japan)	**Minatofuji**	M9		(Japan)	Ōhinode	6	-	9	-	0
8	-	7	-	0		(Japan)	**Kaihō**	M10		(Japan)	**Wakanosato**	11	-	4	-	0
7	-	8	-	0		(Japan)	Daizen	M11		(Japan)	**Shikishima**	8	-	7	-	0
7	-	7	-	1	ø	(Japan)	Ganyū	M12		(Japan)	**Wakanojō**	8	-	7	-	0
9	-	6	-	0		(Japan)	**Asanosho**	M13		(Japan)	**Hamanoshima**	9	-	6	-	0
5	-	10	-	0		(Japan)	Oginishiki	M14		(Mongolia)	**Kyokutenhō**	9	-	6	-	0
9	-	6	-	0		(Japan)	**Yōtsukasa**	M15	ø							

ø - Indicates a pull-out or absent rank
**winning record in bold**
**Yusho Winner**

=== Nagoya basho ===
Aichi Prefectural Gymnasium, Nagoya, 9 July – 23 July

1999 Nagoya basho results - Makuuchi Division
W		L		A	East			Rank	West			W		L		A
13	-	2	-	0		(United States)	**Akebono**	Y		(United States)	**Musashimaru**	12	-	3	-	0
0	-	0	-	15	ø	(Japan)	Wakanohana	Y		(Japan)	**Takanohana**	9	-	6	-	0
8	-	7	-	0		(Japan)	**Takanonami**	O		(Japan)	**Chiyotaikai**	10	-	5	-	0
8	-	7	-	0		(Japan)	**Kaiō**	S		(Japan)	**Dejima***	13	-	2	-	0
6	-	9	-	0		(Japan)	Tochiazuma	S	ø							
11	-	4	-	0		(Japan)	**Tosanoumi**	K		(Japan)	Chiyotenzan	3	-	12	-	0
8	-	7	-	0		(Japan)	**Kotonishiki**	M1		(Japan)	Akinoshima	6	-	9	-	0
4	-	11	-	0		(Japan)	Wakanosato	M2		(Japan)	Tōki	7	-	8	-	0
4	-	11	-	0		(Japan)	Takatōriki	M3		(Japan)	Higonoumi	2	-	13	-	0
7	-	8	-	0		(Japan)	Miyabiyama	M4		(Japan)	Minatofuji	7	-	8	-	0
5	-	10	-	0		(Japan)	Aogiyama	M5		(Japan)	Kaihō	5	-	10	-	0
11	-	4	-	0		(Japan)	**Musōyama**	M6		(Japan)	**Tamakasuga**	9	-	6	-	0
9	-	6	-	0		(Mongolia)	**Kyokushūzan**	M7		(Japan)	**Shikishima**	8	-	7	-	0
0	-	0	-	15	ø	(Japan)	Tochinonada	M8		(Japan)	**Asanosho**	9	-	6	-	0
6	-	9	-	0		(Japan)	Hamanoshima	M9	ø	(Japan)	Tochinowaka	2	-	8	-	5
9	-	6	-	0		(Japan)	**Kotonowaka**	M10		(Mongolia)	Kyokutenhō	7	-	8	-	0
3	-	12	-	0		(Japan)	Wakanojō	M11		(Japan)	**Terao**	8	-	7	-	0
7	-	8	-	0		(Japan)	Yōtsukasa	M12		(Japan)	Daizen	5	-	10	-	0
8	-	7	-	0		(Japan)	**Tokitsuumi**	M13		(Japan)	**Wakanoyama**	8	-	7	-	0
7	-	8	-	0		(Japan)	Ōhinode	M14		(Japan)	**Ganyū**	9	-	6	-	0
9	-	6	-	0		(Japan)	**Kotoryū**	M15	ø							

ø - Indicates a pull-out or absent rank
**winning record in bold**
**Yusho Winner**
***Won Playoff**

=== Aki basho ===
Ryogoku Kokugikan, Tokyo, 12 September – 26 September

1999 Aki basho results - Makuuchi Division
W		L		A	East			Rank	West			W		L		A
2	-	2	-	11	ø	(United States)	Akebono	Y		(United States)	**Musashimaru**	12	-	3	-	0
0	-	3	-	12	ø	(Japan)	Takanohana	Y		(Japan)	Wakanohana	7	-	8	-	0
10	-	5	-	0		(Japan)	**Chiyotaikai**	O	ø	(Japan)	Takanonami	3	-	4	-	8
10	-	5	-	0		(Japan)	**Dejima**	O	ø							
9	-	6	-	0		(Japan)	**Kaiō**	S		(Japan)	Tosanoumi	7	-	8	-	0
5	-	10	-	0		(Japan)	Kotonishiki	K		(Japan)	**Musōyama**	8	-	7	-	0
10	-	5	-	0		(Japan)	**Tochiazuma**	M1		(Japan)	**Tamakasuga**	8	-	7	-	0
7	-	8	-	0		(Mongolia)	Kyokushūzan	M2		(Japan)	Asanosho	7	-	8	-	0
6	-	9	-	0		(Japan)	Tōki	M3		(Japan)	**Akinoshima**	11	-	4	-	0
3	-	12	-	0		(Japan)	Shikishima	M4		(Japan)	Kotonowaka	7	-	8	-	0
10	-	5	-	0		(Japan)	**Miyabiyama**	M5		(Japan)	Minatofuji	6	-	9	-	0
6	-	9	-	0		(Japan)	Chiyotenzan	M6		(Japan)	Wakanosato	6	-	9	-	0
9	-	6	-	0		(Japan)	**Takatōriki**	M7		(Japan)	**Terao**	8	-	7	-	0
5	-	10	-	0		(Japan)	Tochinonada	M8		(Japan)	**Aogiyama**	8	-	7	-	0
7	-	8	-	0		(Japan)	Kaihō	M9		(Japan)	Ganyū	5	-	10	-	0
7	-	8	-	0		(Japan)	Tokitsuumi	M10		(Japan)	**Kotoryū**	8	-	7	-	0
9	-	6	-	0		(Japan)	**Wakanoyama**	M11		(Japan)	**Higonoumi**	8	-	7	-	0
8	-	7	-	0		(Mongolia)	**Kyokutenhō**	M12		(Japan)	**Hamanoshima**	8	-	7	-	0
6	-	9	-	0		(Japan)	Kinkaiyama	M13	ø	(Japan)	Yōtsukasa	0	-	3	-	12
8	-	7	-	0		(Japan)	**Ōtsukasa**	M14		(Japan)	**Asanowaka**	9	-	6	-	0
8	-	7	-	0		(Japan)	**Ōhinode**	M15	ø							

ø - Indicates a pull-out or absent rank
**winning record in bold**
**Yusho Winner**

=== Kyushu basho ===
Fukuoka International Centre, Kyushu, 7 November – 21 November

1999 Kyushu basho results - Makuuchi Division
W		L		A	East			Rank	West			W		L		A
12	-	3	-	0		(United States)	**Musashimaru**	Y	ø	(Japan)	Wakanohana	0	-	0	-	15
0	-	0	-	15	ø	(United States)	Akebono	Y		(Japan)	**Takanohana**	11	-	4	-	0
9	-	6	-	0		(Japan)	**Chiyotaikai**	O		(Japan)	**Dejima**	10	-	5	-	0
6	-	9	-	0		(Japan)	Takanonami	O	ø							
11	-	4	-	0		(Japan)	**Kaiō**	S		(Japan)	**Tochiazuma**	10	-	5	-	0
10	-	5	-	0		(Japan)	**Musōyama**	K		(Japan)	Akinoshima	3	-	12	-	0
					ø			K		(Japan)	**Tosanoumi**	10	-	5	-	0
3	-	12	-	0		(Japan)	Tamakasuga	M1		(Japan)	**Miyabiyama**	8	-	7	-	0
2	-	13	-	0		(Japan)	Takatōriki	M2		(Japan)	Kotonishiki	7	-	8	-	0
5	-	10	-	0		(Mongolia)	Kyokushūzan	M3		(Japan)	Asanosho	4	-	11	-	0
5	-	10	-	0		(Japan)	Terao	M4		(Japan)	Aogiyama	6	-	9	-	0
8	-	7	-	0		(Japan)	**Kotonowaka**	M5		(Japan)	**Tōki**	9	-	6	-	0
7	-	8	-	0		(Japan)	Wakanoyama	M6		(Japan)	**Kotoryū**	9	-	6	-	0
7	-	8	-	0		(Japan)	Minatofuji	M7		(Japan)	**Higonoumi**	8	-	7	-	0
6	-	9	-	0		(Mongolia)	Kyokutenhō	M8		(Japan)	Chiyotenzan	7	-	8	-	0
9	-	6	-	0		(Japan)	**Asanowaka**	M9	ø	(Japan)	Wakanosato	5	-	7	-	3
8	-	7	-	0		(Japan)	**Hamanoshima**	M10		(Japan)	**Shikishima**	8	-	7	-	0
8	-	7	-	0		(Japan)	**Kaihō**	M11		(Japan)	**Ōtsukasa**	8	-	7	-	0
8	-	7	-	0		(Japan)	**Tokitsuumi**	M12		(Japan)	**Tochinonada**	10	-	5	-	0
8	-	7	-	0		(Japan)	**Ōhinode**	M13		(Japan)	Daizen	7	-	8	-	0
0	-	10	-	5	ø	(Japan)	Ganyū	M14		(Japan)	**Takanowaka**	9	-	6	-	0

ø - Indicates a pull-out or absent rank
**winning record in bold**
**Yusho Winner**

== News ==
=== January ===
- At the Hatsu basho, the yusho or tournament championship is decided in a final day showdown between Wakanohana, still searching for his first yusho as a yokozuna, and sekiwake Chiyotaikai, who is one win behind him on 12–2. Chiyotaikai defeats Wakanohana in their regulation match, and in the subsequent playoff for the championship he wins a rematch after the first bout is judged too close to call, despite the referee originally awarding the bout to Wakanohana. Shortly after the tournament Chiyotaikai is promoted to ozeki, the first new holder of sumo's second highest rank since Musashimaru and Takanonami were promoted five years earlier. Akebono misses his second tournament in a row with a herniated disk in his lower back. His fellow yokozuna Takanohana turns in a mediocre 8–7 score. Special prizes are awarded to Chiyotaikai for Outstanding Performance and Fighting Spirit (shared with colleague Chiyotenzan) and Akinoshima for Technique. The juryo championship is won for the second time in a row by Miyabiyama. Former komusubi Asahiyutaka retires.

=== February ===
- Asahiyutaka takes over the running of Tatsunami stable from his father-in-law, former sekiwake Annenyama, who has reached the mandatory elder retirement age of 65.
- Akebono has his first practice session since November 1998.

=== March ===
- Musashimaru wins his fourth top division championship with a 13–2 score. He has little competition from his top ranked rivals, as Takanohana, Wakanohana and Chiyotaikai all withdraw midway through injury, while Akebono is missing altogether. Takanonami is runner-up on 12–3. Makuuchi debutant Miyabiyama wins the fighting spirit prize, as does Chiyotenzan for the second time in just his second top division tournament. Veteran Akinoshima wins eleven bouts and the Outstanding Performance Prize. Mitoizumi is demoted from makuuchi for the first time since 1987. Daizen wins the juryo yusho with a 12–3 score and returns to the top division at the age of 34. Towanoyama wins the makushita championship. Former maegashira Toyonoumi and Tatsuhikari retire.

=== May ===
- Musashimaru wins his second championship in a row with a 13–2 record, to become the second foreign yokozuna. He defeats fellow Hawaiian Akebono on the final day, who after losing his first two bouts comes through with a respectable 11–4 score on his comeback. Runner-up to Musashimaru is Kaio on 12–3, who wins the Fighting Spirit Prize. Chiyotenzan wins his third straight sansho, for Outstanding Performance, shared with Tosanoumi. Wakanosato wins the Technique prize. Takanohana sits the tournament out, recovering from an injured shoulder, while his brother Wakanohana is forced to withdraw for the second tournament in a row with a leg sprain. Otsukasa wins the juryo championship.
- Musashimaru's promotion is confirmed, although he embarrasses himself by being unable to phrase his official acceptance correctly. It is the first time since May 1991 that four yokozuna are active at the same time.

=== July ===
- The Nagoya basho fails to attract a sell-out crowd for the first time in ten years on the second day.
- Sekiwake Dejima wins his first yusho, defeating Akebono in a playoff after both men finish on 13–2. Akebono is denied his first championship in over two years. Dejima's Musashigawa stablemate Musashimaru finishes on 12–3 in his debut tournament as a yokozuna. Wakanohana is out injured, while Takanohana can only manage 9–6 in his comeback. Dejima is awarded all three special prizes and after the tournament is promoted to ozeki. Tosanoumi also receives a share of the Fighting Spirit prize for his eleven wins at komusubi rank. Kinkaiyama wins the juryo title. Veteran Tochinowaka, at 37 the oldest man in the top division, announces his retirement. Former komusubi Kotoinazuma also retires. In makushita, Daishoho retires to seek treatment for pancreatic cancer.

=== September ===
- Musashimaru needs only twelve wins to secure his first championship as a yokozuna. Takanohana, Takanonami and Akebono all withdraw early, while Wakanohana, clearly unfit, becomes the first yokozuna since Onokuni in 1989 to fight a full 15 days and fail to make his majority of wins. Thirty-two-year-old Akinoshima is runner-up on 11–4 and wins his fourth Technique Prize and eighth Fighting Spirit Award. This gives him a total of 19 special prizes, one more than the record of 18 previously held by Kotonishiki. Tochiazuma receives the Outstanding Performance Award. Hayateumi wins the juryo yusho. Former maegashira Tokitsunada, and juryo veteran Zenshinyama, announce their retirements.

=== November ===
- Musashimaru wins his fourth yusho of the year by defeating Takanohana on the final day to finish on 12–3. Takanohana is runner-up with Kaio on 11–4. Kaio receives the Fighting Spirit prize. Sekiwake Tochiazuma and komusubi Tosanoumi each score ten and win special prizes, for Technique and Outstanding Performance respectively. Takanonami is demoted from the ozeki rank after managing only a 6–9 score on his comeback. In the juryo division, the lightweight Mainoumi, known as the "Department Store of Techniques", announces his retirement. Oginishiki wins the yusho.

== Deaths ==
- 28 July: Former juryo Dairyu, aged 54, of cirrhosis of the liver.
- 3 Oct: Former juryo Haji (also known as Saganoumi), aged 53, in a car accident. He was also a professional baseball player.
- 11 Nov: Former maegashira Otayama, aged 75.
- 4 Dec: Former komusubi Daishoho, aged 32, of cancer.

== See also ==
- Glossary of sumo terms
- List of past sumo wrestlers
- List of years in sumo
- List of yokozuna
