= Daizen Takahiro =

Sumo wrestler

Personal information
- Native name: 大善 尊太
- Born: Tokuo Takahashi; 14 December 1964 (age 61) Naniwa-ku, Osaka, Japan
- Height: 1.88 m (6 ft 2 in)
- Weight: 144 kg (317 lb)

Sport
- Sport: Sumo
- Retired: March, 2003
- Heya: Nishonoseki
- Record: 739-732-61
- Debut: March, 1981
- Highest rank: Komusubi (March, 1994)
- Elder name: Fujigane
- Championships: 3 (Jūryō); 1 (Makushita)
- Gold Stars: 2 (Akebono, Musashimaru)
- Updated on August 2012

Daizen Takahiro (born 14 December 1964 as Tokuo Takahashi) is a former sumo wrestler from Osaka, Osaka, Japan. He made his professional debut in March 1981, and reached the top division in November 1991. His highest rank was komusubi and he earned two kinboshi. After his retirement in 2003 he became an elder in the Japan Sumo Association and a coach at Nishonoseki stable. Upon the closure of his stable in 2013 he moved to Kasugano stable.

== Career record ==
Daizen Takahiro
Year	January Hatsu basho, Tokyo	March Haru basho, Osaka	May Natsu basho, Tokyo	July Nagoya basho, Nagoya	September Aki basho, Tokyo	November Kyūshū basho, Fukuoka
1981	x	(Maezumo)	East Jonokuchi #16; 3–4	East Jonokuchi #1; 5–2	East Jonidan #102; 2–5	East Jonidan #126; 4–3
1982	West Jonidan #101; 5–2	West Jonidan #52; 0–7	East Jonidan #102; 4–3	West Jonidan #80; 5–2	West Jonidan #41; 2–5	West Jonidan #62; 5–2
1983	West Jonidan #18; 2–5	East Jonidan #46; 4–3	East Jonidan #27; 4–3	West Jonidan #12; 3–4	West Jonidan #31; 4–3	West Jonidan #13; 4–3
1984	West Sandanme #88; 4–3	East Sandanme #67; 5–2	East Sandanme #31; 2–5	East Sandanme #55; 4–3	West Sandanme #39; 3–4	West Sandanme #53; 1–2–4
1985	West Sandanme #93; Sat out due to injury 0–0–7	West Sandanme #93; Sat out due to injury 0–0–7	West Jonidan #44; 5–2	East Jonidan #6; 5–2	East Sandanme #46; 4–3	East Sandanme #42; 4–3
1986	West Sandanme #23; 4–3	West Sandanme #9; 5–2	West Makushita #43; 3–4	East Makushita #59; 4–3	East Makushita #44; 3–4	West Makushita #56; 5–2
1987	West Makushita #38; 5–2	East Makushita #23; 3–4	East Makushita #33; 5–2	West Makushita #18; 4–3	East Makushita #13; 5–2	East Makushita #5; 6–1
1988	East Makushita #1; 6–1–P	East Jūryō #9; 8–7	East Jūryō #6; 2–8–5	West Makushita #2; Sat out due to injury 0–0–7	West Makushita #2; 4–3	West Makushita #1; 3–4
1989	East Makushita #6; 3–4	East Makushita #11; 3–4	West Makushita #16; 2–5	West Makushita #34; 3–4	West Makushita #45; 5–2	West Makushita #24; 7–0; Champion
1990	West Makushita #4; 3–4	East Makushita #9; 6–1	East Makushita #2; 3–4	West Makushita #5; 6–1	West Makushita #1; 4–3	West Jūryō #13; 8–7
1991	East Jūryō #11; 9–6	West Jūryō #7; 8–7	East Jūryō #5; 6–9	West Jūryō #9; 9–6	East Jūryō #5; 12–3–P; Champion	West Maegashira #11; 7–8
1992	East Maegashira #13; 6–9	East Maegashira #16; 7–8	West Jūryō #1; 9–6	East Maegashira #14; 7–8	West Maegashira #14; 10–5	West Maegashira #5; 9–6
1993	East Maegashira #4; 5–10	West Maegashira #10; 7–8	West Maegashira #11; 7–8	East Maegashira #14; 9–6	West Maegashira #5; 5–10	East Maegashira #12; 10–5
1994	East Maegashira #3; 8–7	West Komusubi #1; 5–10	West Maegashira #4; 7–8	East Maegashira #5; 6–9	East Maegashira #9; 9–6	East Maegashira #3; 6–9 ★
1995	East Maegashira #6; 2–13	West Maegashira #14; 6–9	West Jūryō #1; 7–8	East Jūryō #4; 8–7	East Jūryō #2; 7–8	West Jūryō #4; 5–10
1996	East Jūryō #10; 9–6	East Jūryō #7; 7–8	East Jūryō #9; 8–7	East Jūryō #5; 11–4–P; Champion	East Jūryō #1; 7–8	West Jūryō #2; Sat out due to injury 0–0–15
1997	West Jūryō #2; 5–10	East Jūryō #7; 7–7–1	West Jūryō #8; Sat out due to injury 0–0–15	West Jūryō #8; 7–8	East Jūryō #10; 7–8	West Jūryō #10; 9–6
1998	East Jūryō #5; 8–7	East Jūryō #3; 6–9	East Jūryō #6; 7–8	West Jūryō #9; 8–7	West Jūryō #8; 8–7	West Jūryō #6; 7–8
1999	West Jūryō #8; 8–7	West Jūryō #2; 12–3; Champion	East Maegashira #11; 7–8	West Maegashira #12; 5–10	East Jūryō #1; 9–6	West Maegashira #13; 7–8
2000	West Jūryō #1; 10–5	West Maegashira #12; 9–6	West Maegashira #3; 3–12	West Maegashira #10; 5–10	West Jūryō #2; 7–8	West Jūryō #4; 8–7
2001	West Jūryō #1; 6–9	West Jūryō #3; 9–6	East Maegashira #14; 8–7	West Maegashira #11; 8–7	West Maegashira #8; 9–6	East Maegashira #6; 6–9 ★
2002	West Maegashira #8; 7–8	West Maegashira #9; 9–6	East Maegashira #4; 4–11	West Maegashira #9; 6–9	East Maegashira #11; 4–11	East Jūryō #5; 7–8
2003	West Jūryō #7; 4–11	East Makushita #1; Retired; 2–5	x	x	x	x
Record given as wins–losses–absences Top division champion Top division runner-up Retired Lower divisions Non-participation Sanshō key: F=Fighting spirit; O=Outstanding performance; T=Technique Also shown: ★=Kinboshi; P=Playoff(s); Divisions: Makuuchi — Jūryō — Makushita — Sandanme — Jonidan — Jonokuchi Makuuchi ranks: Yokozuna — Ōzeki — Sekiwake — Komusubi — Maegashira

== See also ==
- Glossary of sumo terms
- List of past sumo wrestlers
- List of sumo elders
- List of sumo tournament second division champions
- List of komusubi
