= Chiyotenzan Daihachirō =

Japanese sumo wrestler (1976–2024)

Personal information
- Native name: 千代天山 大八郎
- Born: Daihachirō Sumi; February 6, 1976 Higashisumiyoshi-ku, Osaka, Japan
- Died: August 28, 2024 (aged 48)
- Height: 1.83 m (6 ft 0 in)
- Weight: 137 kg (302 lb)

Sport
- Sport: Sumo
- Retired: January 2008
- Heya: Kokonoe
- Record: 519-541-33
- Debut: March 1991
- Highest rank: Komusubi (July 1999)
- Championships: 1 (Jūryō)
- Special Prizes: Outstanding Performance (1); Fighting Spirit (2)
- Gold Stars: 3 Musashimaru (2); Wakanohana III
- Updated on January 2008

Chiyotenzan Daihachirō (Japanese: 千代天山 大八郎; February 6, 1976 – August 28, 2024), born Daihachirō Sumi (角 大八郎, Sumi Daihachirō), was a Japanese sumo wrestler from Osaka. His highest rank was komusubi.

== Early life and career ==
Chiyotenzan Daihachirō was born on February 6, 1976, as a premature baby, who had to spend more than a year and a half in an incubator.

Chiyotenzan made his professional debut in March 1991, joining the Kokonoe stable. He reached the second highest jūryō division in January 1997, and the top makuuchi division two years after that. He had an explosive start to his makuuchi career, winning three special prizes in his first three tournaments (the first wrestler ever to do so) and reaching the fourth highest rank of komusubi in July 1999. However, that was to be his only tournament in the top ranks and his initial promise quickly faded. His last winning score in the top division came in November 2001 and after suffering a fractured leg in the January 2002 tournament he fell back to jūryō in July 2002. Hampered by diabetes, his fortunes slumped even further. After making a final appearance in the sekitori ranks in November 2005, in January 2006 he was demoted to the unsalaried makushita division, and in May 2007, to the fourth sandanme division. He reappeared in makushita in September 2007, but won only one match before withdrawing. By November he had fallen to sandanme 27, the second lowest rank ever held by a former sanyaku wrestler.

== Later life and death ==
After losing his first bout in the January 2008 tournament, Chiyotenzan announced his retirement. He was unable to obtain an elder position in the Japan Sumo Association and left the sumo world completely.

Chiyotenzan died on August 28, 2024, at the age of 48, after a long period of declining health.

== Fighting style ==
Chiyotenzan's favoured kimarite or techniques were migi-yotsu (a left hand outside, right hand inside grip on the opponent's mawashi), yori kiri (force out) and uwatenage (overarm throw).

== Career record ==
Chiyotenzan Daihachirō
Year	January Hatsu basho, Tokyo	March Haru basho, Osaka	May Natsu basho, Tokyo	July Nagoya basho, Nagoya	September Aki basho, Tokyo	November Kyūshū basho, Fukuoka
1991	x	(Maezumo)	East Jonokuchi #15; 4–3	East Jonidan #115; 2–5	East Jonidan #5; 3–4	West Jonokuchi #8; 5–2
1992	East Jonidan #100; 5–2	West Jonidan #52; 3–4	East Jonidan #79; 3–4	East Jonidan #101; 4–3	West Jonidan #74; 1–6	East Jonidan #145; 7–0–P
1993	East Sandanme #98; 5–2	West Sandanme #67; 4–3	West Sandanme #48; 1–3–3	East Sandanme #78; 5–2	West Sandanme #42; 5–2	East Sandanme #16; 1–3–3
1994	East Sandanme #52; 6–1	East Sandanme #6; 1–6	West Sandanme #37; 4–3	West Sandanme #24; 5–2	East Makushita #57; 5–2	West Makushita #36; 2–5
1995	East Makushita #60; 5–2	West Makushita #36; 5–2	West Makushita #22; 4–3	West Makushita #18; 4–3	East Makushita #13; 3–4	East Makushita #18; 4–3
1996	West Makushita #12; 4–3	East Makushita #9; 3–4	East Makushita #17; 3–4	West Makushita #22; 4–3	East Makushita #17; 6–1	West Makushita #4; 5–2
1997	East Jūryō #12; 8–7	West Jūryō #9; 7–8	West Jūryō #10; 5–10	West Makushita #1; 5–2	West Jūryō #11; 9–6	East Jūryō #5; 6–9
1998	East Jūryō #8; 8–7	East Jūryō #6; 8–7	East Jūryō #4; 7–8	West Jūryō #6; 7–8	East Jūryō #8; 12–3; Champion	East Jūryō #2; 9–6
1999	East Maegashira #14; 10–5; F	East Maegashira #9; 9–6; F	East Maegashira #3; 9–6; O★	West Komusubi #1; 3–12	East Maegashira #6; 6–9	West Maegashira #8; 7–8
2000	East Maegashira #11; 9–6	West Maegashira #5; 6–9	West Maegashira #6; 6–9	East Maegashira #9; 10–5	East Maegashira #2; 6–9	West Maegashira #3; 6–9 ★
2001	West Maegashira #6; 8–7	East Maegashira #2; 7–8 ★	West Maegashira #2; 4–11	West Maegashira #6; 6–9	East Maegashira #11; 8–7	West Maegashira #8; 8–7
2002	East Maegashira #4; 3–7–5	West Maegashira #10; Sat out due to injury 0–0–15	West Maegashira #10; 5–10	West Maegashira #13; 5–10	East Jūryō #5; 8–7	East Jūryō #4; 3–12
2003	West Jūryō #12; 4–11	West Makushita #6; 5–2	West Makushita #2; 5–2	West Jūryō #11; 9–6	East Jūryō #7; 8–7	East Jūryō #6; 8–7
2004	West Jūryō #3; 11–4–PP	West Maegashira #13; 3–12	East Jūryō #5; 6–9	West Jūryō #6; 5–10	West Jūryō #11; 8–7	West Jūryō #10; 6–9
2005	West Jūryō #13; 5–10	West Makushita #2; 5–2	West Jūryō #11; 7–8	East Jūryō #13; 6–9	East Makushita #2; 5–2	East Jūryō #10; 4–11
2006	East Makushita #2; 2–5	West Makushita #8; 2–5	East Makushita #21; 3–4	East Makushita #28; 3–4	East Makushita #36; 4–3	East Makushita #29; 4–3
2007	West Makushita #22; 2–5	East Makushita #41; 2–5	East Sandanme #5; 3–4	West Sandanme #16; 5–2	West Makushita #56; 1–5–1	West Sandanme #27; 5–2
2008	East Sandanme #4; Retired; 0–1	x	x	x	x	x
Record given as wins–losses–absences Top division champion Top division runner-up Retired Lower divisions Non-participation Sanshō key: F=Fighting spirit; O=Outstanding performance; T=Technique Also shown: ★=Kinboshi; P=Playoff(s); Divisions: Makuuchi — Jūryō — Makushita — Sandanme — Jonidan — Jonokuchi Makuuchi ranks: Yokozuna — Ōzeki — Sekiwake — Komusubi — Maegashira

== See also ==
- List of sumo tournament second division champions
- Glossary of sumo terms
- List of past sumo wrestlers
- List of komusubi
