= Kotoryū Hiroo =

Japanese sumo wrestler

Personal information
- Native name: 琴龍宏央
- Born: Katsumi Nakano; 2 March 1972 (age 54) Hyōgo, Japan
- Height: 1.84 m (6 ft 1/2 in)
- Weight: 143 kg (315 lb)

Sport
- Sport: Sumo
- Retired: May, 2005
- Heya: Sadogatake
- Record: 591-576-77
- Debut: March, 1987
- Highest rank: Maegashira 1 (January, 2000)
- Championships: 1 (Jūryō)
- Special Prizes: Fighting Spirit (1)
- Gold Stars: 3 Takanohana II (2); Musashimaru
- Updated on July 2007

Kotoryū Hiroo (born 2 March 1972 as Katsumi Nakano) is a former sumo wrestler from Hyōgo, Japan. He joined professional sumo in 1987, reaching the top division in 1996. He defeated yokozuna three times and earned one Fighting Spirit Prize (kanto-sho). His highest rank was maegashira 1.

== Career ==
He was born in Takasago, Hyōgo Prefecture, but moved to Ichikawa, Chiba Prefecture as a child. Kotoryū made his professional debut in March 1987 at the age of 15, joining Sadogatake stable. At the beginning of his career, he used the shikona Kotonakano, switching to Kotoryū in March 1993.

He had a slow rise up the ranks initially, although he almost won the third-division championship in September 1992, losing only the final bout in an eight-way playoff. He was first promoted to sekitori status in July 1994 upon promotion to the second highest jūryō division but could only last one tournament there. He returned to jūryō in May 1995 and made his debut in the top makuuchi division in July 1996.

Kotoryū was ranked in the top division for 51 tournaments over a period of nine years, earning three kinboshi, or gold stars, for defeating yokozuna. He also received one sanshō for Fighting Spirit. He was a regular in the upper maegashira ranks but he was never able to earn a promotion to san'yaku. He came back from a number of injuries that sent him down to the jūryō division, winning the only yūshō or tournament championship of his career in that division in March 2002 with a 12–3 record which earned him a promotion back to makuuchi. He finally retired in May 2005 at the age of 33. He had been suffering from liver problems and diabetes and lost some 20 kg (44 lb) in weight, and felt he had reached his physical limit. At his retirement press conference, he said the most memorable bout of his career was his upset of yokozuna Musashimaru in January 2000. In a match lasting two minutes he won by yori-kiri or force out despite being outweighed by 80 kg (180 lb).

== Fighting style ==
Kotoryū used both tsuki/oshi (pushing and thrusting) and yotsu (grappling) techniques. His preferred grip on the mawashi was hidari-yotsu, with his right hand outside and left hand inside his opponent's arms. Among his favourite kimarite were uwatenage (overarm throw) and tsuridashi (the lift out). However, he most often won with yori-kiri (the force out).

== Retirement from sumo ==
After retirement Kotoryū stayed on as a coach at his stable for a short time under his fighting name, but he was unable to acquire permanent toshiyori, or elder status and so left the sumo world in April 2006, to help with his father's business.

== Career record ==
Kotoryū Hiroo
Year	January Hatsu basho, Tokyo	March Haru basho, Osaka	May Natsu basho, Tokyo	July Nagoya basho, Nagoya	September Aki basho, Tokyo	November Kyūshū basho, Fukuoka
1987	x	(Maezumo)	West Jonokuchi #36; 4–3	West Jonidan #153; 3–4	West Jonokuchi #11; 4–3	East Jonidan #131; 3–4
1988	East Jonokuchi #2; 4–3	West Jonidan #101; 3–4	East Jonidan #118; 2–5	East Jonidan #156; 5–2	West Jonidan #105; 5–2	East Jonidan #59; 2–5
1989	West Jonidan #83; 4–3	East Jonidan #52; 3–4	East Jonidan #70; 6–1	West Jonidan #4; 3–4	West Jonidan #23; 3–4	West Jonidan #42; 6–1
1990	East Sandanme #84; 2–5	West Jonidan #17; 6–1	East Sandanme #60; 3–4	West Sandanme #80; 5–2	East Sandanme #47; 4–3	East Sandanme #26; 4–3
1991	West Sandanme #10; 5–2	East Makushita #51; 3–4	East Sandanme #5; 3–4	East Sandanme #20; 4–3	West Sandanme #4; 4–3	West Makushita #49; 4–3
1992	West Makushita #39; 5–2	East Makushita #21; 3–4	East Makushita #30; 5–2	West Makushita #14; 3–4	West Makushita #20; 6–1–PPP	East Makushita #8; 4–3
1993	West Makushita #5; 4–3	West Makushita #3; 3–4	West Makushita #8; 0–7	West Makushita #43; 5–2	West Makushita #29; 6–1	West Makushita #12; 3–4
1994	West Makushita #17; 6–1	East Makushita #8; 5–2	West Makushita #1; 5–2	West Jūryō #12; 6–9	East Makushita #3; 4–3	West Makushita #1; 3–4
1995	East Makushita #5; 5–2	West Makushita #1; 4–3	West Jūryō #13; 9–6	West Jūryō #9; 8–7	West Jūryō #8; 8–7	West Jūryō #6; 7–8
1996	West Jūryō #7; 9–6	East Jūryō #4; 10–5	East Jūryō #2; 11–4	East Maegashira #15; 8–7	West Maegashira #13; 8–7	West Maegashira #8; 7–8
1997	West Maegashira #11; 10–5; F	East Maegashira #5; 4–11	East Maegashira #8; 5–10	West Maegashira #12; 8–7	East Maegashira #12; 7–8	West Maegashira #14; 9–6
1998	East Maegashira #11; 9–6	East Maegashira #5; 4–11	West Maegashira #10; 6–9	West Maegashira #13; 8–7	West Maegashira #6; 5–10	West Maegashira #11; 8–7
1999	West Maegashira #5; 5–10 ★	West Maegashira #10; 8–7	West Maegashira #8; 5–10	East Maegashira #15; 9–6	West Maegashira #10; 8–7	West Maegashira #6; 9–6
2000	West Maegashira #1; 6–9 ★	East Maegashira #3; 5–10	West Maegashira #5; 7–8	West Maegashira #6; 9–6	West Maegashira #1; 1–14	East Maegashira #11; 8–7
2001	West Maegashira #7; 9–6	West Maegashira #1; 1–6–8	East Maegashira #10; Sat out due to injury 0–0–15	East Maegashira #10; 8–7	West Maegashira #7; 9–6	East Maegashira #5; 1–1–13
2002	West Jūryō #1; Sat out due to injury 0–0–15	West Jūryō #1; 12–3; Champion	East Maegashira #8; 8–7	West Maegashira #3; Sat out due to injury 0–0–15	West Maegashira #3; 5–10 ★	West Maegashira #6; 7–8
2003	West Maegashira #8; 8–7	East Maegashira #5; 5–10	East Maegashira #10; 9–6	West Maegashira #5; 8–7	East Maegashira #3; 4–11	West Maegashira #7; 7–8
2004	East Maegashira #9; 7–8	West Maegashira #10; 8–7	East Maegashira #9; 10–5	East Maegashira #3; 4–11	East Maegashira #8; 7–8	East Maegashira #9; 8–7
2005	West Maegashira #7; 4–11	West Maegashira #12; 0–4–11	East Jūryō #9; Retired –	x	x	x
Record given as wins–losses–absences Top division champion Top division runner-up Retired Lower divisions Non-participation Sanshō key: F=Fighting spirit; O=Outstanding performance; T=Technique Also shown: ★=Kinboshi; P=Playoff(s); Divisions: Makuuchi — Jūryō — Makushita — Sandanme — Jonidan — Jonokuchi Makuuchi ranks: Yokozuna — Ōzeki — Sekiwake — Komusubi — Maegashira

== See also ==
- List of sumo tournament second division champions
- Glossary of sumo terms
- List of past sumo wrestlers
