= Ganyū Kenji =

Sumo wrestler

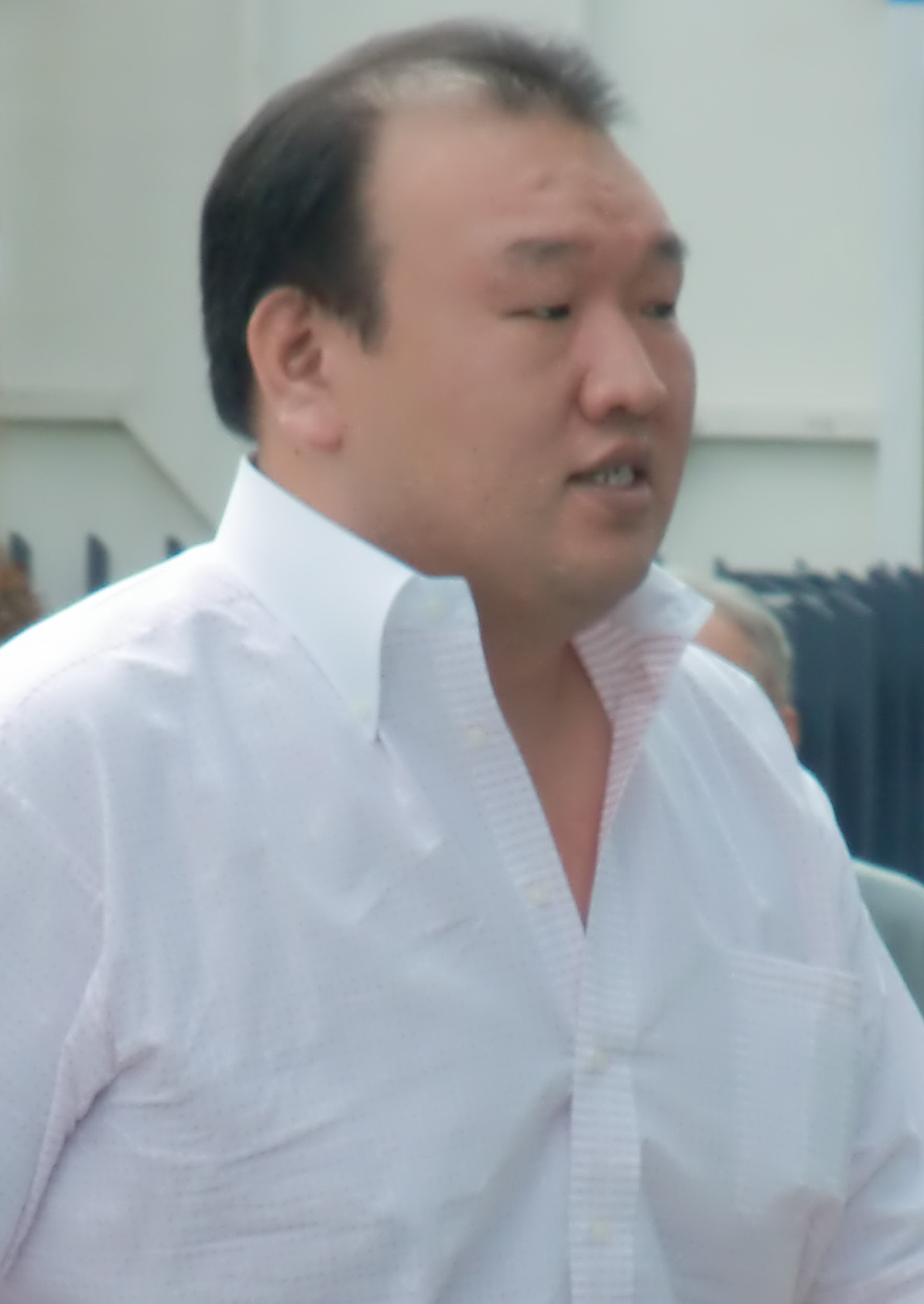

Personal information
- Native name: 巌雄 謙治
- Born: Kenji Hirano; 6 August 1970 (age 56) Himeji, Hyōgo, Japan
- Height: 1.84 m (6 ft 1/2 in)
- Weight: 173 kg (381 lb)

Sport
- Sport: Sumo
- Retired: May, 2000
- Heya: Kitanoumi
- Record: 400-382-53
- Debut: March, 1986
- Highest rank: Maegashira 1 (September, 1997)
- Elder name: Yamahibiki
- Championships: 2 (Makushita); 1 (Jonidan)
- Updated on Sep. 2012

Ganyū Kenji (born 6 August 1970 as Kenji Hirano) is a former sumo wrestler from Himeji, Hyōgo, Japan. He made his professional debut in March 1986, and reached the top division in March 1996. His highest rank was maegashira 1. He retired in 2000 and became an elder of the Japan Sumo Association. In 2015 he became the head coach of Yamahibiki stable following the death of his old stablemaster, Kitanoumi.

== Career ==
In junior high school he liked basketball and shot put, but began taking sumo seriously from his third year when he attended a Nippon Steel sumo class in his home town. He began his professional career in March 1986 at the age of 15, joining Kitanoumi stable which had been founded the previous year by former yokozuna Kitanoumi. He picked up a tournament championship or yūshō in the jonidan division in September 1989 with an undefeated record, and in November 1991 another 7–0 record in the makushita division saw him promoted to jūryō in January 1992. In his first tournament as a sekitori he managed only a 3–12 record and was demoted back to makushita. He missed the May 1992 tournament through injury and a 2–5 record in July saw him fall back to sandanme. It was only when he won the makushita championship in May 1995 that he returned to jūryō, over three years after his jūryō debut. He fared much better the second time around, with four straight kachi-koshi or winning records seeing him promoted to the top makuuchi division for the March 1996 tournament, exactly ten years after his professional debut. He was the first member of Kitanoumi stable to reach makuuchi since its founding in 1985.

Ganyū fought in the top division for 23 tournaments, with a total of 144 wins against 193 losses. He did not manage to win a special prize or a gold star, and he never made san'yaku, his top rank being maegashira 1 which he reached in September 1997. In May 1999 he continued fighting in the tournament despite having ligament damage in his ankle, in search of the eighth win that would give him a winning record. He was also restricted by persistent knee problems. His last makuuchi tournament was in November 1999.

== Retirement from sumo ==
He retired in May 2000, having been demoted to makushita, and became an elder in the Japan Sumo Association under the name Yamahibiki. He took over the running over the Kitanoumi stable in November 2015 after the death of Kitanoumi. The stable was renamed Yamahibiki stable, as Kitanoumi had a special one-generation elder status and the name could not be passed on. As of 2021 the stable does not have any sekitori. Yamahibiki served as a councilor of the Japan Sumo Association alongside Minatogawa-oyakata and Ōtake-oyakata for two years from 2014. He was elected to the Sumo Association's board of directors in 2016, and served as director of the sumo training school, replacing Tomozuna. He was re-elected in 2018, but stood down in 2020.

== Fighting style ==
Ganyū was a yotsu-sumo wrestler who primarily used grappling techniques as opposed to pushing. His preferred grip on his opponent's mawashi or belt was migi-yotsu, a left hand outside, right hand inside position. His most common winning kimarite were yorikiri (force out) and uwatenage (outer arm throw).

== Career record ==
Ganyū Kenji
| Year | January Hatsu basho, Tokyo | March Haru basho, Osaka | May Natsu basho, Tokyo | July Nagoya basho, Nagoya | September Aki basho, Tokyo | November Kyūshū basho, Fukuoka |
|---|---|---|---|---|---|---|
| 1986 | x | (Maezumo) | West Jonokuchi #10; 4–3 | West Jonidan #123; 4–3 | West Jonidan #97; 3–4 | West Jonidan #111; 6–1 |
| 1987 | West Jonidan #40; 5–2 | West Jonidan #4; 2–5 | West Jonidan #39; 5–2 | East Jonidan #4; 4–3 | West Sandanme #90; 5–2 | East Sandanme #54; 3–4 |
| 1988 | East Sandanme #68; 6–1 | East Sandanme #18; 4–3 | East Sandanme #5; 4–3 | East Makushita #46; 5–2 | East Makushita #28; 1–6 | West Makushita #56; Sat out due to injury 0–0–7 |
| 1989 | West Makushita #56; 4–3 | East Makushita #44; 0–1–6 | East Makushita #20; Sat out due to injury 0–0–7 | East Makushita #80; Sat out due to injury 0–0–7 | West Jonidan #40; 7–0–P; Champion | East Sandanme #45; 6–1 |
| 1990 | East Makushita #60; 3–4 | East Sandanme #15; 3–4 | West Sandanme #31; 6–1 | East Makushita #52; 5–2 | East Makushita #31; 4–3 | West Makushita #18; 3–4 |
| 1991 | West Makushita #25; 6–1 | East Makushita #8; 2–5 | West Makushita #20; 4–3 | East Makushita #13; 3–4 | East Makushita #18; 7–0; Champion | East Makushita #1; 4–3 |
| 1992 | East Jūryō #13; 3–12 | East Makushita #9; 5–2 | West Makushita #4; Sat out due to injury 0–0–7 | East Makushita #44; 2–5 | West Sandanme #3; 6–1 | East Makushita #33; 5–2 |
| 1993 | West Makushita #20; 0–1–6 | West Makushita #60; 6–1 | East Makushita #31; 4–3 | West Makushita #24; 3–4 | West Makushita #32; 5–2 | West Makushita #20; 3–4 |
| 1994 | East Makushita #29; 3–4 | West Makushita #42; 5–2 | West Makushita #26; 6–1 | East Makushita #12; 3–4 | East Makushita #20; 5–2 | West Makushita #12; 3–4 |
| 1995 | East Makushita #20; 4–3 | East Makushita #15; 5–2 | West Makushita #7; 7–0; Champion | East Jūryō #11; 9–6 | West Jūryō #7; 9–6 | East Jūryō #3; 8–7 |
| 1996 | East Jūryō #2; 9–6 | East Maegashira #15; 9–6 | East Maegashira #8; 6–9 | East Maegashira #13; 8–7 | East Maegashira #12; 8–7 | East Maegashira #7; 6–9 |
| 1997 | East Maegashira #12; 8–7 | West Maegashira #6; 7–8 | East Maegashira #7; 7–8 | West Maegashira #8; 8–7 | West Maegashira #1; 3–12 | East Maegashira #7; 7–8 |
| 1998 | East Maegashira #9; 8–7 | West Maegashira #3; 3–12 | East Maegashira #8; 8–7 | East Maegashira #5; 3–12 | West Maegashira #11; 8–7 | West Maegashira #3; 3–12 |
| 1999 | West Maegashira #10; 8–7 | West Maegashira #7; 5–10 | East Maegashira #12; 7–7–1 | West Maegashira #14; 9–6 | West Maegashira #9; 5–10 | East Maegashira #14; 0–10–5 |
| 2000 | East Jūryō #10; 7–8 | East Jūryō #12; 2–13 | East Makushita #10; Retired – | x | x | x |
Record given as wins–losses–absences Top division champion Top division runner-up Retired Lower divisions Non-participation Sanshō key: F=Fighting spirit; O=Outstanding performance; T=Technique Also shown: ★=Kinboshi; P=Playoff(s); Divisions: Makuuchi — Jūryō — Makushita — Sandanme — Jonidan — Jonokuchi Makuuchi ranks: Yokozuna — Ōzeki — Sekiwake — Komusubi — Maegashira

== See also ==
- Glossary of sumo terms
- List of past sumo wrestlers
- List of sumo elders
