= 2000 in sumo =

The following are the events in professional sumo during 2000.

== Tournaments ==
=== Hatsu basho ===
Ryogoku Kokugikan, Tokyo, 9 January – 23 January

2000 Hatsu basho results - Makuuchi Division
W		L		A	East			Rank	West			W		L		A
2	-	2	-	11	ø	(United States)	Musashimaru	Y		(Japan)	**Takanohana**	12	-	3	-	0
0	-	0	-	15	ø	(Japan)	Wakanohana	Y		(United States)	**Akebono**	11	-	4	-	0
9	-	6	-	0		(Japan)	**Dejima**	O		(Japan)	**Chiyotaikai**	9	-	6	-	0
7	-	8	-	0		(Japan)	Kaiō	S		(Japan)	**Tochiazuma**	8	-	7	-	0
13	-	2	-	0		(Japan)	**Musōyama**	S		(Japan)	**Takanonami**	10	-	5	-	0
8	-	7	-	0		(Japan)	**Tosanoumi**	K		(Japan)	**Miyabiyama**	12	-	3	-	0
4	-	11	-	0		(Japan)	Tōki	M1		(Japan)	Kotoryū	6	-	9	-	0
6	-	9	-	0		(Japan)	Kotonowaka	M2		(Japan)	Asanowaka	3	-	12	-	0
3	-	12	-	0		(Japan)	Kotonishiki	M3	ø	(Japan)	Higonoumi	2	-	5	-	8
6	-	9	-	0		(Japan)	Tochinonada	M4		(Japan)	Akinoshima	7	-	8	-	0
5	-	10	-	0		(Japan)	Hamanoshima	M5		(Japan)	Shikishima	7	-	8	-	0
8	-	7	-	0		(Mongolia)	**Kyokushūzan**	M6	ø	(Japan)	Aogiyama	4	-	10	-	1
5	-	10	-	0		(Japan)	Terao	M7		(Japan)	**Wakanoyama**	9	-	6	-	0
8	-	7	-	0		(Japan)	**Tamakasuga**	M8		(Japan)	Asanosho	7	-	8	-	0
6	-	9	-	0		(Japan)	Kaihō	M9		(Japan)	**Minatofuji**	8	-	7	-	0
6	-	9	-	0		(Japan)	Takatōriki	M10		(Japan)	Ōtsukasa	5	-	10	-	0
9	-	6	-	0		(Japan)	**Chiyotenzan**	M11		(Japan)	**Tokitsuumi**	9	-	6	-	0
10	-	5	-	0		(Japan)	**Takanowaka**	M12		(Japan)	Ōhinode	4	-	11	-	0
11	-	4	-	0		(Mongolia)	**Kyokutenhō**	M13		(Japan)	**Ōikari**	8	-	7	-	0
6	-	9	-	0		(Japan)	Kinkaiyama	M14	ø	(Japan)	Wakanosato	0	-	0	-	15

ø - Indicates a pull-out or absent rank
**winning record in bold**
**Yusho Winner**

=== Haru basho ===
Osaka Prefectural Gymnasium, Osaka, 12 March – 26 March

2000 Haru basho results - Makuuchi Division
W		L		A	East			Rank	West			W		L		A
11	-	4	-	0		(Japan)	**Takanohana**	Y		(United States)	**Akebono**	12	-	3	-	0
11	-	4	-	0		(United States)	**Musashimaru**	Y	ø	(Japan)	Wakanohana	2	-	4	-	0
11	-	4	-	0		(Japan)	**Dejima**	O		(Japan)	**Chiyotaikai**	8	-	7	-	0
7	-	8	-	0		(Japan)	Takanonami	O	ø							
12	-	3	-	0		(Japan)	**Musōyama**	S		(Japan)	**Miyabiyama**	11	-	4	-	0
					ø			S		(Japan)	**Tochiazuma**	8	-	7	-	0
8	-	7	-	0		(Japan)	**Tosanoumi**	K		(Japan)	**Kaiō**	8	-	7	-	0
6	-	9	-	0		(Japan)	Wakanoyama	M1		(Mongolia)	Kyokushūzan	5	-	10	-	0
5	-	10	-	0		(Japan)	Tamakasuga	M2		(Mongolia)	Kyokutenhō	4	-	11	-	0
5	-	10	-	0		(Japan)	Kotoryū	M3	ø	(Japan)	Kotonowaka	0	-	0	-	15
2	-	11	-	2	ø	(Japan)	Minatofuji	M4		(Japan)	Takanowaka	5	-	10	-	0
5	-	10	-	0		(Japan)	Akinoshima	M5		(Japan)	Chiyotenzan	6	-	9	-	0
9	-	6	-	0		(Japan)	**Tochinonada**	M6		(Japan)	Shikishima	4	-	11	-	0
7	-	8	-	0		(Japan)	Tokitsuumi	M7		(Japan)	Tōki	7	-	8	-	0
8	-	7	-	0		(Japan)	**Asanowaka**	M8	ø	(Japan)	Kotonishiki	2	-	3	-	10
8	-	7	-	0		(Japan)	**Hamanoshima**	M9		(Japan)	**Oginishiki**	8	-	7	-	0
6	-	9	-	0		(Japan)	Asanosho	M10		(Japan)	Hayateumi	7	-	8	-	0
5	-	10	-	0		(Japan)	Ōikari	M11	ø	(Japan)	Higonoumi	0	-	0	-	15
7	-	8	-	0		(Japan)	Terao	M12		(Japan)	**Daizen**	9	-	6	-	0
0	-	0	-	15	ø	(Japan)	Aogiyama	M13		(Japan)	**Kaihō**	8	-	7	-	0
13	-	2	-	0		(Japan)	**Takatōriki**	M14	ø	(Japan)	Wakanosato	0	-	0	-	15

ø - Indicates a pull-out or absent rank
**winning record in bold**
**Yusho Winner**

=== Natsu basho ===
Ryogoku Kokugikan, Tokyo, 7 May – 21 May

2000 Natsu basho results - Makuuchi Division
W		L		A	East			Rank	West			W		L		A
13	-	2	-	0		(United States)	**Akebono**	Y		(Japan)	**Takanohana**	13	-	2	-	0
0	-	0	-	15	ø	(United States)	Musashimaru	Y	ø							
8	-	7	-	0		(Japan)	**Dejima**	O	ø	(Japan)	Musōyama	0	-	0	-	15
11	-	4	-	0		(Japan)	**Chiyotaikai**	O		(Japan)	Takanonami	6	-	9	-	0
11	-	4	-	0		(Japan)	**Miyabiyama**	S		(Japan)	**Tochiazuma**	9	-	6	-	0
9	-	6	-	0		(Japan)	**Tosanoumi**	K		(Japan)	**Kaiō**	14	-	1	-	0
					ø			K		(Japan)	Takatōriki	2	-	13	-	0
5	-	10	-	0		(Japan)	Tochinonada	M1		(Japan)	Asanowaka	5	-	10	-	0
5	-	10	-	0		(Japan)	Wakanoyama	M2		(Japan)	Hamanoshima	3	-	12	-	0
6	-	9	-	0		(Japan)	Oginishiki	M3		(Japan)	Daizen	3	-	12	-	0
5	-	10	-	0		(Mongolia)	Kyokushūzan	M4		(Japan)	**Tamakasuga**	9	-	6	-	0
7	-	8	-	0		(Japan)	Kaihō	M5		(Japan)	Kotoryū	7	-	8	-	0
7	-	8	-	0		(Mongolia)	Kyokutenhō	M6		(Japan)	Chiyotenzan	6	-	9	-	0
8	-	7	-	0		(Japan)	**Takanowaka**	M7		(Japan)	**Akinoshima**	10	-	5	-	0
0	-	0	-	15	ø	(Japan)	Kotomitsuki	M8		(Japan)	Tokitsuumi	5	-	10	-	0
9	-	6	-	0		(Japan)	**Tōki**	M9	ø	(Japan)	Minatofuji	0	-	0	-	15
6	-	9	-	0		(Japan)	Shikishima	M10		(Japan)	Kinkaiyama	5	-	10	-	0
9	-	6	-	0		(Japan)	**Hayateumi**	M11		(Japan)	**Higonoumi**	9	-	6	-	0
12	-	3	-	0		(Japan)	**Tochinohana**	M12		(Japan)	Asanosho	4	-	11	-	0
7	-	8	-	0		(Japan)	Aogiyama	M13		(Japan)	Terao	5	-	10	-	0
6	-	9	-	0		(Japan)	Jūmonji	M14		(Japan)	**Kotonowaka**	10	-	5	-	0

ø - Indicates a pull-out or absent rank
**winning record in bold**
**Yusho Winner**

=== Nagoya basho ===
Aichi Prefectural Gymnasium, Nagoya, 9 July – 23 July

2000 Nagoya basho results - Makuuchi Division
W		L		A	East			Rank	West			W		L		A
13	-	2	-	0		(United States)	**Akebono**	Y	ø	(Japan)	Takanohana	5	-	3	-	7
10	-	5	-	0		(United States)	**Musashimaru**	Y	ø							
11	-	4	-	0		(Japan)	**Chiyotaikai**	O		(Japan)	Miyabiyama	6	-	9	-	0
10	-	5	-	0		(Japan)	**Dejima**	O		(Japan)	Musōyama	4	-	11	-	0
11	-	4	-	0		(Japan)	**Kaiō**	S		(Japan)	**Tochiazuma**	12	-	3	-	0
					ø			S		(Japan)	Takanonami	7	-	8	-	0
7	-	8	-	0		(Japan)	Tosanoumi	K		(Japan)	Tamakasuga	2	-	13	-	0
8	-	7	-	0		(Japan)	**Akinoshima**	M1		(Japan)	Tochinohana	5	-	10	-	0
6	-	9	-	0		(Japan)	Tōki	M2		(Japan)	Takanowaka	6	-	9	-	0
7	-	8	-	0		(Japan)	Tochinonada	M3		(Japan)	Asanowaka	5	-	10	-	0
7	-	8	-	0		(Japan)	Oginishiki	M4		(Japan)	Wakanoyama	7	-	8	-	0
8	-	7	-	0		(Japan)	**Hayateumi**	M5		(Japan)	Higonoumi	4	-	11	-	0
7	-	8	-	0		(Japan)	Kaihō	M6		(Japan)	**Kotoryū**	9	-	6	-	0
8	-	7	-	0		(Japan)	**Kotonowaka**	M7		(Mongolia)	**Kyokutenhō**	9	-	6	-	0
5	-	10	-	0		(Mongolia)	Kyokushūzan	M8		(Japan)	**Takatōriki**	9	-	6	-	0
10	-	5	-	0		(Japan)	**Chiyotenzan**	M9		(Japan)	Minatofuji	7	-	8	-	0
6	-	9	-	0		(Japan)	Hamanoshima	M10		(Japan)	Daizen	5	-	10	-	0
10	-	5	-	0		(Japan)	**Takamisakari**	M11		(Japan)	**Tokitsuumi**	9	-	6	-	0
3	-	12	-	0		(Japan)	Shikishima	M12		(Japan)	**Ōtsukasa**	8	-	7	-	0
8	-	7	-	0		(United States)	**Sentoryū**	M13		(Japan)	**Aminishiki**	10	-	5	-	0
6	-	9	-	0		(Japan)	Aogiyama	M14		(Japan)	**Kinkaiyama**	8	-	7	-	0

ø - Indicates a pull-out or absent rank
**winning record in bold**
**Yusho Winner**

=== Aki basho ===
Ryogoku Kokugikan, Tokyo, 3 September – 17 September

2000 Aki basho results - Makuuchi Division
W		L		A	East			Rank	West			W		L		A
13	-	2	-	0		(United States)	**Akebono**	Y	ø	(United States)	**Musashimaru**	14	-	1	-	0
0	-	0	-	15	ø	(Japan)	Takanohana	Y	ø							
10	-	5	-	0		(Japan)	**Chiyotaikai**	O		(Japan)	**Dejima**	10	-	5	-	0
11	-	4	-	0		(Japan)	**Kaiō**	O		(Japan)	**Miyabiyama**	8	-	7	-	0
2	-	4	-	9	ø	(Japan)	Tochiazuma	S		(Japan)	**Musōyama**	10	-	5	-	0
7	-	8	-	0		(Japan)	Akinoshima	K		(Japan)	**Takanonami**	9	-	6	-	0
5	-	10	-	0		(Japan)	Tosanoumi	M1		(Japan)	Kotoryū	1	-	14	-	0
6	-	9	-	0		(Japan)	Chiyotenzan	M2		(Japan)	**Hayateumi**	9	-	6	-	0
4	-	11	-	0		(Mongolia)	Kyokutenhō	M3		(Japan)	Tochinonada	4	-	11	-	0
6	-	9	-	0		(Japan)	Takatōriki	M4		(Japan)	Tōki	6	-	9	-	0
5	-	10	-	0		(Japan)	Oginishiki	M5		(Japan)	Takanowaka	5	-	10	-	0
8	-	7	-	0		(Japan)	**Wakanoyama**	M6		(Japan)	Kotonowaka	7	-	8	-	0
10	-	5	-	0		(Japan)	**Tochinohana**	M7	ø	(Japan)	Takamisakari	1	-	3	-	11
7	-	8	-	0		(Japan)	Kaihō	M8		(Japan)	Asanowaka	6	-	9	-	0
7	-	8	-	0		(Japan)	Tamakasuga	M9		(Japan)	Aminishiki	7	-	8	-	0
7	-	8	-	0		(Japan)	Tokitsuumi	M10		(Japan)	**Wakanosato**	11	-	4	-	0
6	-	9	-	0		(Japan)	Ōtsukasa	M11		(Japan)	Minatofuji	6	-	9	-	0
10	-	5	-	0		(Japan)	**Higonoumi**	M12		(United States)	Sentoryū	5	-	10	-	0
5	-	10	-	0		(Japan)	Kinkaiyama	M13		(Japan)	**Hamanoshima**	9	-	6	-	0
9	-	6	-	0		(Mongolia)	**Kyokushūzan**	M14		(Japan)	Daishi	5	-	10	-	0
8	-	7	-	0		(Japan)	**Tochisakae**	M15	ø							

ø - Indicates a pull-out or absent rank
**winning record in bold**
**Yusho Winner**

=== Kyushu basho ===
Fukuoka International Centre, Kyushu, 5 November – 19 November

2000 Kyushu basho results - Makuuchi Division
W		L		A	East			Rank	West			W		L		A
11	-	4	-	0		(United States)	**Musashimaru**	Y	ø	(United States)	**Akebono**	14	-	1	-	0
11	-	4	-	0		(Japan)	**Takanohana**	Y	ø							
11	-	4	-	0		(Japan)	**Kaiō**	O		(Japan)	**Chiyotaikai**	9	-	6	-	0
9	-	6	-	0		(Japan)	**Dejima**	O		(Japan)	**Miyabiyama**	9	-	6	-	0
					ø			O		(Japan)	**Musōyama**	9	-	6	-	0
6	-	9	-	0		(Japan)	Takanonami	S	ø	(Japan)	Hayateumi	4	-	5	-	6
3	-	12	-	0		(Japan)	Tochinohana	K		(Japan)	**Wakanosato**	9	-	6	-	0
5	-	10	-	0		(Japan)	Akinoshima	M1		(Japan)	Wakanoyama	6	-	9	-	0
5	-	10	-	0		(Japan)	Higonoumi	M2		(Japan)	Hamanoshima	4	-	11	-	0
4	-	11	-	0		(Mongolia)	Kyokushūzan	M3		(Japan)	Chiyotenzan	6	-	9	-	0
7	-	8	-	0		(Japan)	Tosanoumi	M4	ø	(Japan)	Tochiazuma	0	-	0	-	15
4	-	11	-	0		(Japan)	Takatōriki	M5		(Japan)	Tōki	6	-	9	-	0
8	-	7	-	0		(Japan)	**Tochisakae**	M6		(Mongolia)	Kyokutenhō	7	-	8	-	0
8	-	7	-	0		(Japan)	**Kotonowaka**	M7		(Japan)	**Tochinonada**	10	-	5	-	0
7	-	8	-	0		(Japan)	Oginishiki	M8		(Japan)	**Takanowaka**	11	-	4	-	0
8	-	7	-	0		(Japan)	**Kaihō**	M9		(Japan)	**Kotomitsuki**	13	-	2	-	0
8	-	7	-	0		(Japan)	**Tamakasuga**	M10		(Japan)	Aminishiki	1	-	14	-	0
8	-	7	-	0		(Japan)	**Kotoryū**	M11		(Japan)	Asanowaka	6	-	9	-	0
8	-	7	-	0		(Japan)	**Tokitsuumi**	M12		(Japan)	Jūmonji	5	-	10	-	0
5	-	10	-	0		(Japan)	Ōtsukasa	M13		(Japan)	**Minatofuji**	8	-	7	-	0
7	-	8	-	0		(Japan)	Wakakosho	M14		(Japan)	Tamanonada	7	-	8	-	0

ø - Indicates a pull-out or absent rank
**winning record in bold**
**Yusho Winner**

== News ==
=== January ===
- At the Hatsu basho in Tokyo, sekiwake Musoyama wins his first top makuuchi division yusho or tournament championship with a 13–2 record, finishing one win ahead of Musashigawa stablemate Miyabiyama, and yokozuna Takanohana. He wins Technique and Outstanding Performance Prizes (the latter shared with Miyabiyama). The Fighting Spirit Award is given jointly to Kyokutenho and Takanowaka. It is the sixth consecutive championship won by a member of the Musashigawa stable. Yokozuna Musashimaru pulls out through injury. It is the first time he has missed any bouts in his career and it brings to an end a record run of 55 consecutive tournaments with a majority of wins. Former komusubi Oginishiki wins his second juryo division championship in a row.

=== February ===
- Former maegashira Kushimaumi branches out from Dewanoumi stable to open his own Tagonoura stable.
- Kise stable shuts down as its stablemaster, former maegashira Kiyonomori, is approaching the mandatory retirement age of 65.

=== March ===
- The sumo world has to deal with several allegations of match-fixing - Hawaiian former wrestler Takamio tells the Shukan Post that he helped yokozuna Akebono fix matches, ex-komusubi Itai makes similar allegations in a series of articles, and Shikinohana says current members of the Sumo Association's hierarchy also engaged in the practice when they were active wrestlers decades ago.
- The Osaka tournament has a surprise winner: 32-year-old maegashira Takatoriki, who was on the brink of demotion but pulls off a stunning 13–2 score. He also wins the Outstanding Performance Award, and a record tenth Fighting Spirit Prize. Musoyama finishes runner-up alongside Akebono and earns promotion to ozeki. He also receives his fourth Technique Prize. Miyabiyama gets a share of the Fighting Spirit Prize. Takanohana's elder brother and fellow yokozuna Wakanohana announces his retirement at the age of 29, after failing to recover from a leg injury sustained in the previous September tournament. He proved unable to add to his five career championships in his brief yokozuna career. Tochinohana wins the juryo yusho.

=== April ===
- 27: The Sumo Association award Wakanohana a bonus of 70 million yen for his services to sumo.
- 30: 4500 spectators attend a training session for all the top rikishi at the Kokugikan, which is open to the public for the first time.

=== May ===
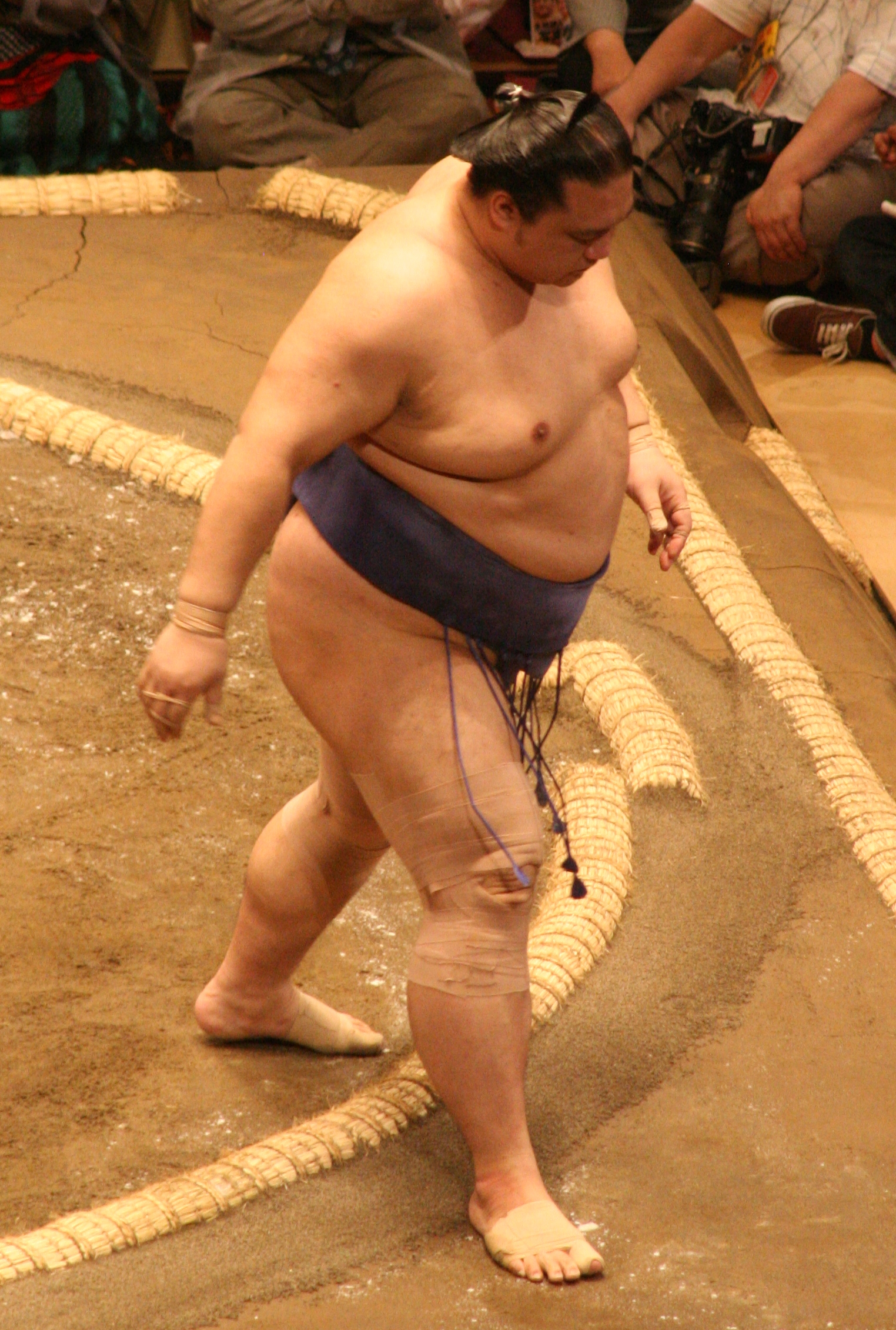
Kaio won his first yusho and promotion to ozeki in 2000.

- For the third tournament in a row, a rikishi below the rank of ozeki takes the championship: this time it is komusubi Kaio with a 14–1 record. He receives his ninth Outstanding Performance Prize, and fifth Fighting Spirit Award. Yokozuna Takanohana and Akebono finish one win behind on 13–2. Musoyama misses his debut ozeki tournament through injury. Miyabiyama joins him at the rank after posting his second consecutive 11–4 record, but the decision to promote him is (unusually) not unanimous. He also gets a share of the Shukun-sho. He replaces veteran Takanonami, who is demoted from ozeki for the second time. Tochinohana, in his top division debut, scores 12 and receives the Fighting Spirit and Technique Prizes. A record eight sekitori miss the tournament, the most since the six tournaments per year schedule was introduced in 1958. Wakanosato, recuperating from injury, wins the juryo championship. Former maegashira Ganyū retires.

=== July ===
- In Nagoya, Akebono wins his first yusho since 1997, finishing one win ahead of sekiwake Tochiazuma with a 13–2 score. Tochiazuma receives the Technique Prize. Takanohana pulls out after injuring his elbow. Musoyama can only manage four wins and is demoted from ozeki. Kaio by contrast follows up his yusho in May with a fine 11–4 record and is finally promoted to ozeki at the age of 28. He also receives a record-equalling tenth Outstanding Performance Prize. The Fighting Spirit Award is shared between newcomers Takamisakari and Aminishiki, who each score ten. American Sentoryu also gets a winning score in his debut top division tournament. Wakanosato wins his second juryo yusho in a row. The makushita division championship is won by Asashoryu with a perfect 7–0 record.

=== August ===
- Tatsutagawa stable shuts down as its stablemaster, former sekiwake Aonosato, is approaching the mandatory retirement age. Its wrestlers, including sekitori Jumonji, Shikishima and Toyozakura, move to Michinoku stable.

=== September ===
- Having suffered from injuries and been looking below par all year, Musashimaru dominates the Aki basho, losing only on the final day to win his eighth championship with a 14–1 score. Akebono finishes runner-up on 13–2. Takanohana sits the tournament out. Musoyama regains his ozeki rank by winning ten bouts, meaning there will be five ozeki in November. Tochinohana and Hayateumi share the Technique Prize. Wakanosato gets the Fighting Spirit Award on his return to makuuchi. Kotomitsuki wins the juryo championship. Popular top division veterans Kotonishiki and Mitoizumi, now in juryo, both announce their retirements. Also retiring are former maegashira Kitakachidoki (meaning there are no longer any sekitori from Hokkaido) and Ohinode.
- 23: Wakanohana's retirement ceremony (danpatsu-shiki) takes place at the Kokugikan. Accompanying him in his final yokozuna dohyo-iri are his fellow grand champions Akebono and Takanohana.

=== November ===
- In Kyushu, Akebono wins his second yusho of the year, and eleventh overall, with a fine 14–1 record. This means he has more wins this year than any other wrestler. He finishes one win ahead of newcomer Kotomitsuki, who wins all three special prizes. Wakanosato also receives his first Outstanding Performance Prize. Kinkaiyama wins his third juryo championship. Ex maegashira Dewaarashi retires.
- 18: The former Wakanohana announces he is giving up his elder position in the Sumo Association to become a TV tarento.

== Deaths ==
- 14 Jan: Onaruto Oyakata, former maegashira Yoshinotani, aged 50.

== See also ==
- Glossary of sumo terms
- List of past sumo wrestlers
- List of years in sumo
- List of yokozuna
