= Oginishiki Yasutoshi =

Japanese sumo wrestler

Personal information
- Native name: 小城錦康年
- Born: Yasutoshi Koiwai; 8 July 1971 (age 55) Chiba, Japan
- Height: 1.86 m (6 ft 1 in)
- Weight: 138 kg (304 lb)

Sport
- Sport: Sumo
- Retired: January 2004
- Heya: Dewanoumi
- Record: 605-585-107
- Debut: March 1987
- Highest rank: Komusubi (July 1997)
- Elder name: Nakadachi
- Championships: 2 (Jūryō)
- Special Prizes: Fighting Spirit (1); Outstanding Performance (1); Technique (2)
- Gold Stars: 2 (Akebono, Takanohana II)
- Updated on August 2012

Oginishiki Yasutoshi (born 8 July 1971 as Yasutoshi Koiwai) is a former sumo wrestler from Ichikawa, Chiba Prefecture, Japan. His highest rank was komusubi. His father and brother were also sumo wrestlers. He is now a coach at Dewanoumi stable.

== Career ==
The son of former sekiwake Oginohana Masaaki, he joined Dewanoumi stable in March 1987, where his father worked as a coach, and four years after his elder brother Oginohana Akikazu had also joined the stable. The "Ogi" character in his shikona was taken from Ogi, Saga where his father was born. Initially wrestling under his own surname of Koiwai, he switched to Oginoshu in 1989 and then Oginishiki in 1990. He reached sekitori status in November 1991 upon promotion to the jūryō division and the top makuuchi division in May 1993, joining his brother who had first reached makuuchi in January 1990.

Oginishiki had a more successful top division career than his brother, who reached a highest rank of maegashira 2 and never managed to win a special prize or defeat a yokozuna. Oginishiki, by contrast, earned the Fighting Spirit award in only his third makuuchi tournament after a strong 11-4 record. Two tournaments later in March 1994 he defeated yokozuna Akebono and was awarded the Technique Prize. In November 1996 he defeated all three ozeki but could only score 6-9 overall. In May 1997, an 11-4 record at Maegashira 4 saw him pick up his second Technique award and earn promotion to sumo's fourth highest rank of komusubi. He could only manage four wins in his sanyaku debut however, and never managed to return to the rank. In May 1998 he defeated yokozuna Takanohana and tournament winner Wakanohana and won the Outstanding Performance award. At the end of 1999 he dropped back into the jūryō division but two consecutive yusho or tournament championships saw him return to the top division. He suffered a number of injury problems later in his career, and fell to jūryō once more.

After making his final top division appearance in March 2002, he fought until January 2004 before retiring on the 12th day with eight losses, facing certain demotion to makushita.

== Retirement from sumo ==
Oginishiki has stayed in the sumo world as a coach at Dewanoumi stable, alongside his brother, and is now known as Nakadachi-oyakata.

== Career record ==
Oginishiki Yasutoshi
Year	January Hatsu basho, Tokyo	March Haru basho, Osaka	May Natsu basho, Tokyo	July Nagoya basho, Nagoya	September Aki basho, Tokyo	November Kyūshū basho, Fukuoka
1987	x	(Maezumo)	West Jonokuchi #5; 2–0–5	East Jonokuchi #20; Sat out due to injury 0–0–7	East Jonokuchi #20; 6–1	East Jonidan #101; 6–1
1988	East Jonidan #34; 4–3	East Jonidan #8; 3–4	West Jonidan #25; 6–1	East Sandanme #68; 3–4	East Sandanme #90; 6–1	East Sandanme #38; 4–3
1989	East Sandanme #23; 3–4	West Sandanme #36; 3–4	West Sandanme #53; 4–3	West Sandanme #36; 6–1	East Makushita #57; 3–4	East Sandanme #10; 4–3
1990	West Makushita #59; 3–4	West Sandanme #14; 3–4	West Sandanme #30; 5–2	West Sandanme #4; 5–2	East Makushita #42; 6–1	West Makushita #19; 4–3
1991	East Makushita #12; 2–5	East Makushita #27; 5–2	West Makushita #14; 5–2	West Makushita #3; 4–3	East Makushita #1; 6–1	West Jūryō #8; 6–9
1992	West Jūryō #12; 7–8	East Jūryō #13; 9–6	West Jūryō #7; 6–9	West Jūryō #9; 7–8	East Jūryō #10; 10–5	West Jūryō #4; 8–7
1993	West Jūryō #2; 8–7	East Jūryō #1; 8–7	East Maegashira #16; 9–6	West Maegashira #10; 4–11	East Jūryō #1; 9–6	East Maegashira #16; 11–4; F
1994	East Maegashira #5; 7–8	East Maegashira #6; 9–6; T★	East Maegashira #1; 7–8	West Maegashira #1; 4–11	East Maegashira #8; 5–10	East Maegashira #14; 8–7
1995	West Maegashira #12; 9–6	West Maegashira #5; 3–12	West Maegashira #15; 8–7	West Maegashira #14; 9–6	East Maegashira #6; 5–10	East Maegashira #13; 8–7
1996	East Maegashira #12; 8–7	West Maegashira #3; 2–13	East Maegashira #13; 8–7	West Maegashira #12; 8–7	East Maegashira #11; 9–6	East Maegashira #4; 6–9
1997	East Maegashira #6; 4–11	East Maegashira #15; 11–4	West Maegashira #5; 11–4; T	East Komusubi #1; 4–11	East Maegashira #3; Sat out due to injury 0–0–15	East Maegashira #3; 6–9
1998	East Maegashira #5; 5–10	West Maegashira #8; 9–6	West Maegashira #3; 8–7; O★	East Maegashira #1; 2–9–4	West Maegashira #8; Sat out due to injury 0–0–15	West Maegashira #8; 6–9
1999	East Maegashira #12; 8–7	East Maegashira #11; 7–8	East Maegashira #14; 5–10	East Jūryō #3; 6–9	East Jūryō #7; 8–7	East Jūryō #5; 11–4–P; Champion
2000	East Jūryō #2; 13–2; Champion	West Maegashira #9; 8–7	East Maegashira #3; 6–9	East Maegashira #4; 7–8	East Maegashira #5; 5–10	East Maegashira #8; 7–8
2001	West Maegashira #10; 0–2–13	East Jūryō #5; Sat out due to injury 0–0–15	East Jūryō #5; 12–3	West Maegashira #14; 9–6	West Maegashira #10; 8–7	East Maegashira #8; 5–10
2002	East Maegashira #13; 7–8	East Maegashira #14; 4–11	East Jūryō #4; 5–10	West Jūryō #9; 10–5	East Jūryō #6; 8–7	West Jūryō #5; 7–8
2003	East Jūryō #8; 9–6	East Jūryō #4; 9–6	West Jūryō #1; 4–5–6	West Jūryō #7; 10–5	East Jūryō #2; 1–2–12	West Jūryō #13; Sat out due to injury 0–0–15
2004	West Jūryō #13; Retired; 4–9	x	x	x	x	x
Record given as wins–losses–absences Top division champion Top division runner-up Retired Lower divisions Non-participation Sanshō key: F=Fighting spirit; O=Outstanding performance; T=Technique Also shown: ★=Kinboshi; P=Playoff(s); Divisions: Makuuchi — Jūryō — Makushita — Sandanme — Jonidan — Jonokuchi Makuuchi ranks: Yokozuna — Ōzeki — Sekiwake — Komusubi — Maegashira

== See also ==
- Glossary of sumo terms
- List of sumo tournament second division champions
- List of past sumo wrestlers
- List of sumo elders
- List of komusubi
