= Kaihō Ryōji =

Japanese sumo wrestler

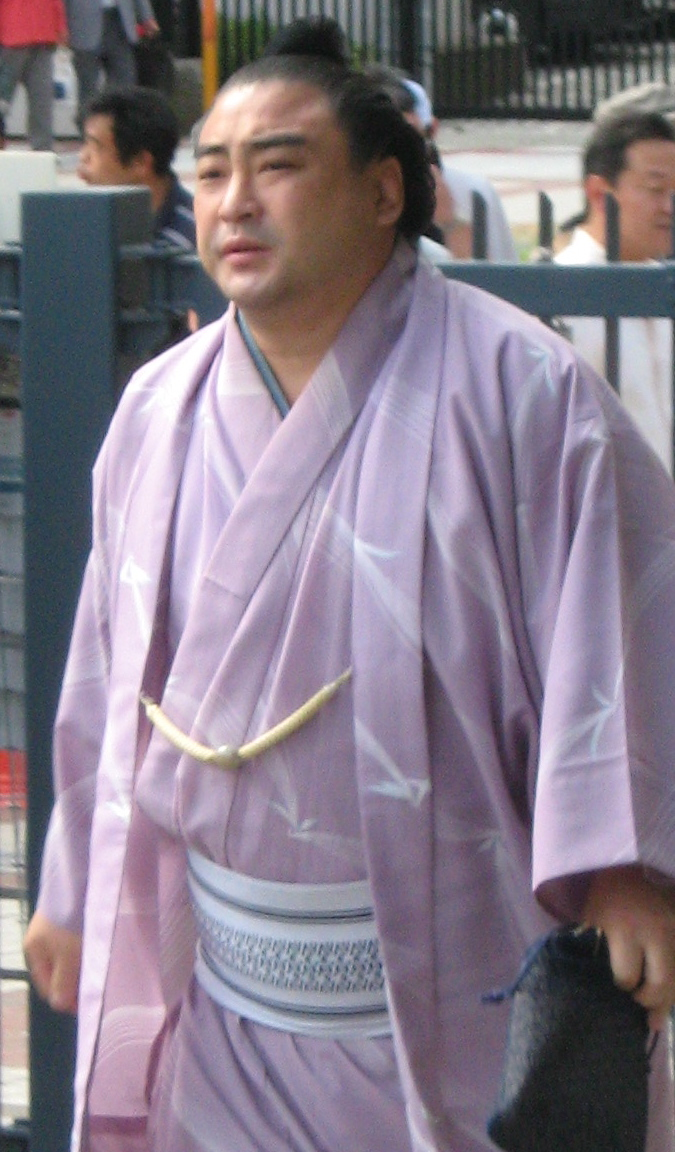

Personal information
- Native name: 海鵬 涼至 (Japanese)
- Born: Ryōji Kumagaya; April 17, 1973 (age 53) Aomori, Japan
- Height: 1.77 m (5 ft 9 1/2 in)
- Weight: 122 kg (269 lb)

Sport
- Sport: Sumo
- University team: Nihon University
- Retired: July 2010
- Heya: Hakkaku
- Record: 572-637-36
- Debut: January 1996
- Highest rank: Komusubi (November 2001)
- Elder name: Tanigawa
- Championships: 1 (Makushita)
- Special Prizes: 2 (Technique)
- Gold Stars: 1 (Musashimaru)
- Updated on June 2020

Kaihō Ryōji (born April 17, 1973 as Ryōji Kumagaya) is a former sumo wrestler from Aomori, Japan. His highest rank was komusubi. An amateur champion at Nihon University, he entered professional sumo in 1996. He was one of the lightest sekitori wrestlers in recent years. He won two special prizes for Technique. He retired from active competition in 2010 and became a coach, but in April 2011 he was asked to resign from the Japan Sumo Association after being found guilty of match-fixing.

== Career ==
Kaihō was born in Fukaura, a town in the Nishitsugaru District of Aomori Prefecture. He was an amateur sumo champion at Nihon University, and won the middleweight world title for Japan in the 2nd World Sumo Championships held at the Ryogoku Kokugikan. He entered professional sumo in January 1996 at the age of 22, joining Hakkaku stable. Because of his amateur achievements, he was given makushita tsukedashi status and allowed to enter at the bottom of the third highest makushita division. He won the makushita championship in his very first tournament with a perfect 7-0 record, defeating Kyokutenhō in a playoff - the only yūshō of his career. He was promoted to the second highest jūryō division in May 1997. At this point he switched from fighting under his family name of Kumagaya to the shikona of Kaihō, which was taken from the name of his father's boat, Kaihō-maru (Kai means "ocean" or "sea" in Japanese).

He reached the top makuuchi division in May 1998, the first wrestler from his stable to do so, and remained a rank and file maegashira for the next three years. In the September 2001 tournament he defeated yokozuna Musashimaru, earning his first kinboshi and scored ten wins. He was rewarded with his first sanshō or special prize and was promoted to the san'yaku ranks at komusubi for the following tournament. He was however, unable to maintain that rank.

He stayed in the top division for the next 44 tournaments with just one brief demotion to jūryō in November 2003, and won his second special prize in March 2005 after a fine 11-4 record. However, just two tournaments later in July 2005 he suffered a fractured ankle in a bout against Iwakiyama on the 14th day. He was forced to sit out the final day and the whole of the following tournament in September, resulting in demotion to the second division in November 2005. He remained there until July 2007, when, due to the unusually large number of retirements and demotions from the top division, a 9-6 score at jūryō 5 was good enough to return him to makuuchi.

He produced a strong 10-5 record in his first tournament back in the top division, and although he missed out on another special prize he was promoted up the rankings to maegashira 6. He could only win four bouts at that rank in September 2007 and after another losing score of 6-9 in November, he fell to maegashira 16, the lowest rank in the top division. An 8-7 record in the January 2008 tournament preserved his top division status, but in March he could manage only four wins and was demoted back to jūryō for the May 2008 tournament, where he remained for the next two years. In May 2010 he scored just 3-12 at the lowest rank of jūryō 14, and he was demoted to the non-salaried makushita division for the first time in 13 years.

== Retirement ==
Kaihō did not take part in the July 2010 tournament and announced his retirement on the eighth day. He became a coach at Hakkaku stable under the toshiyori name Tanigawa-oyakata. However, in April 2011 he was told to resign from the Sumo Association after an investigation into alleged bout-rigging prompted by the discovery by police of text messages on the mobile phone of former wrestler Kasuganishiki, which mentioned Kaihō and a number of other wrestlers as being involved in throwing matches. He was given an envelope containing the message, "You intentionally had sumo bouts lacking fighting spirit with Kasuganishiki on the 13th day of the New Year Grand Sumo Tournament in 2010 and the seventh day of the Spring Grand Sumo Tournament in 2010." Kaihō responded angrily to the decision of the fact-finding panel, saying "There is no evidence to incriminate me because I didn't do it. They only trust what Kasuganishiki says, and they wouldn't listen to me."

Following his retirement Kaiho became certified as a kaatsu instructor and opened his own gym in Tokyo, where he trained some wrestlers active in professional sumo such as Hidenoumi. In July 2015 he took part in a mixed martial arts match held at the Ryogoku Kokugikan, losing by a technical knock out. As of 2018 he was a coach at Nihon University sumo club.

== Fighting style ==
Kaihō was below average size for a rikishi and relied on his technical ability, employing a similar sumo style to Mainoumi. He won two special prizes for Technique. His favourite grip on his opponent's mawashi was hidari-yotsu, a right arm outside, left hand inside grip. He specialised in throws, and regularly used his inside grip to win by shitatenage, or underarm throw. He is also fond of uchigake, the inside leg trip. He was known for often employing henka, or sidestepping at the tachi-ai or initial charge, and was adept at using inashi, or ducking and moving diagonally back from the opponent. He had a higher than average number of wins by okuri-dashi, or push out from behind, as a result.

== Career record ==
Kaihō Ryōji
Year	January Hatsu basho, Tokyo	March Haru basho, Osaka	May Natsu basho, Tokyo	July Nagoya basho, Nagoya	September Aki basho, Tokyo	November Kyūshū basho, Fukuoka
1996	Makushita tsukedashi #60; 7–0–P; Champion	West Makushita #8; 5–2	West Makushita #2; 2–5	West Makushita #14; 4–3	West Makushita #9; 3–4	East Makushita #16; 4–3
1997	West Makushita #8; 5–2	East Makushita #3; 6–1–PP	East Jūryō #13; 9–6	East Jūryō #9; 6–9	West Jūryō #12; 9–6	East Jūryō #6; 9–6
1998	East Jūryō #3; 9–6	West Jūryō #1; 8–7	East Maegashira #16; 8–7	East Maegashira #14; 8–7	East Maegashira #10; 8–7	West Maegashira #2; 3–12
1999	West Maegashira #9; 6–9	West Maegashira #12; 8–7	East Maegashira #10; 8–7	West Maegashira #5; 5–10	East Maegashira #9; 7–8	East Maegashira #11; 8–7
2000	East Maegashira #9; 6–9	West Maegashira #13; 8–7	East Maegashira #5; 7–8	East Maegashira #6; 7–8	East Maegashira #8; 7–8	East Maegashira #9; 8–7
2001	West Maegashira #3; 4–11	East Maegashira #9; 8–7	East Maegashira #6; 6–9	West Maegashira #10; 9–6	East Maegashira #4; 10–5; T★	West Komusubi #1; 5–10
2002	East Maegashira #3; 5–10	West Maegashira #8; 7–8	West Maegashira #8; 8–7	West Maegashira #4; 5–8–2	East Maegashira #8; Sat out due to injury 0–0–15	East Maegashira #8; 8–7
2003	East Maegashira #5; 7–8	West Maegashira #5; 8–7	East Maegashira #4; 5–10	East Maegashira #8; 6–9	West Maegashira #10; 5–10	East Jūryō #1; 8–7
2004	West Maegashira #15; 7–8	West Maegashira #16; 9–6	East Maegashira #12; 9–6	West Maegashira #8; 7–8	West Maegashira #9; 6–9	East Maegashira #13; 10–5
2005	West Maegashira #6; 5–10	West Maegashira #10; 11–4; T	East Maegashira #4; 4–11	East Maegashira #10; 8–7	West Maegashira #7; Sat out due to injury 0–0–15	East Jūryō #4; 5–10
2006	West Jūryō #7; 7–8	East Jūryō #8; 8–7	East Jūryō #7; 7–8	West Jūryō #8; 8–7	East Jūryō #6; 6–9	West Jūryō #9; 8–7
2007	West Jūryō #6; 9–6	East Jūryō #2; 6–9	East Jūryō #5; 9–6	East Maegashira #15; 10–5	West Maegashira #6; 4–11	West Maegashira #14; 6–9
2008	West Maegashira #16; 8–7	East Maegashira #14; 4–11	East Jūryō #5; 6–9	East Jūryō #7; 5–10	West Jūryō #13; 8–7	East Jūryō #5; 5–10
2009	West Jūryō #8; 8–7	West Jūryō #4; 4–11	West Jūryō #11; 8–7	East Jūryō #9; 7–8	East Jūryō #11; 9–6	East Jūryō #4; 4–11
2010	West Jūryō #11; 8–7	East Jūryō #8; 4–11	West Jūryō #14; 3–12	West Makushita #10; Retired; 0–0–4	x	x
Record given as wins–losses–absences Top division champion Top division runner-up Retired Lower divisions Non-participation Sanshō key: F=Fighting spirit; O=Outstanding performance; T=Technique Also shown: ★=Kinboshi; P=Playoff(s); Divisions: Makuuchi — Jūryō — Makushita — Sandanme — Jonidan — Jonokuchi Makuuchi ranks: Yokozuna — Ōzeki — Sekiwake — Komusubi — Maegashira

== See also ==
- Glossary of sumo terms
- List of past sumo wrestlers
- List of komusubi
