= Kokkai Futoshi =

Georgian sumo wrestler (born 1981)

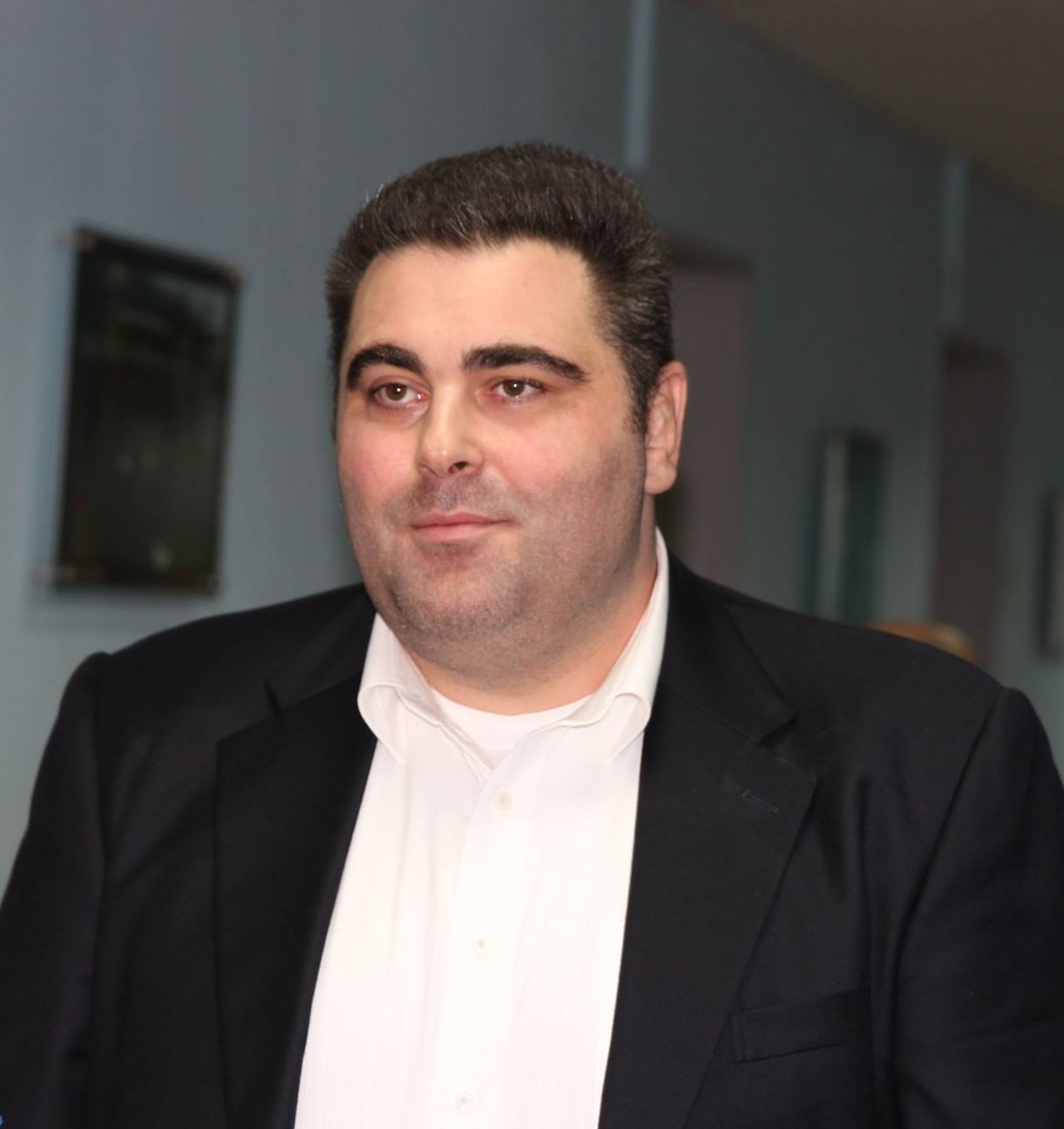

Personal information
- Native name: 黒海 太
- Born: Levan Tsaguria; March 10, 1981 (age 45) Sukhumi, Georgian SSR, Soviet Union (now Georgia)
- Height: 1.89 m (6 ft 2 1/2 in)
- Weight: 153 kg (337 lb; 24.1 st)

Sport
- Sport: Sumo
- Retired: September, 2012
- Heya: Oitekaze
- Record: 446-458-10
- Debut: May, 2001
- Highest rank: Komusubi (September, 2006)
- Championships: 1 (Jūryō); 1 (Makushita); 1 (Sandanme); 1 (Jonidan)
- Special Prizes: Fighting Spirit (2)
- Gold Stars: 2 (Asashōryū)
- Updated on Sep. 2012

Kokkai Futoshi (born March 10, 1981, as Levan Tsaguria, Georgian: ლევან ცაგურია) is a former professional sumo wrestler from Georgia. He began his career in May 2001. He is the first Georgian rikishi to reach sumo's highest division, makuuchi, which he achieved in 2004. His highest rank was komusubi, which he reached in 2006. He earned two special prizes for Fighting Spirit and two gold stars for defeating yokozuna. He wrestled for Oitekaze stable.

== Early life and sumo background ==
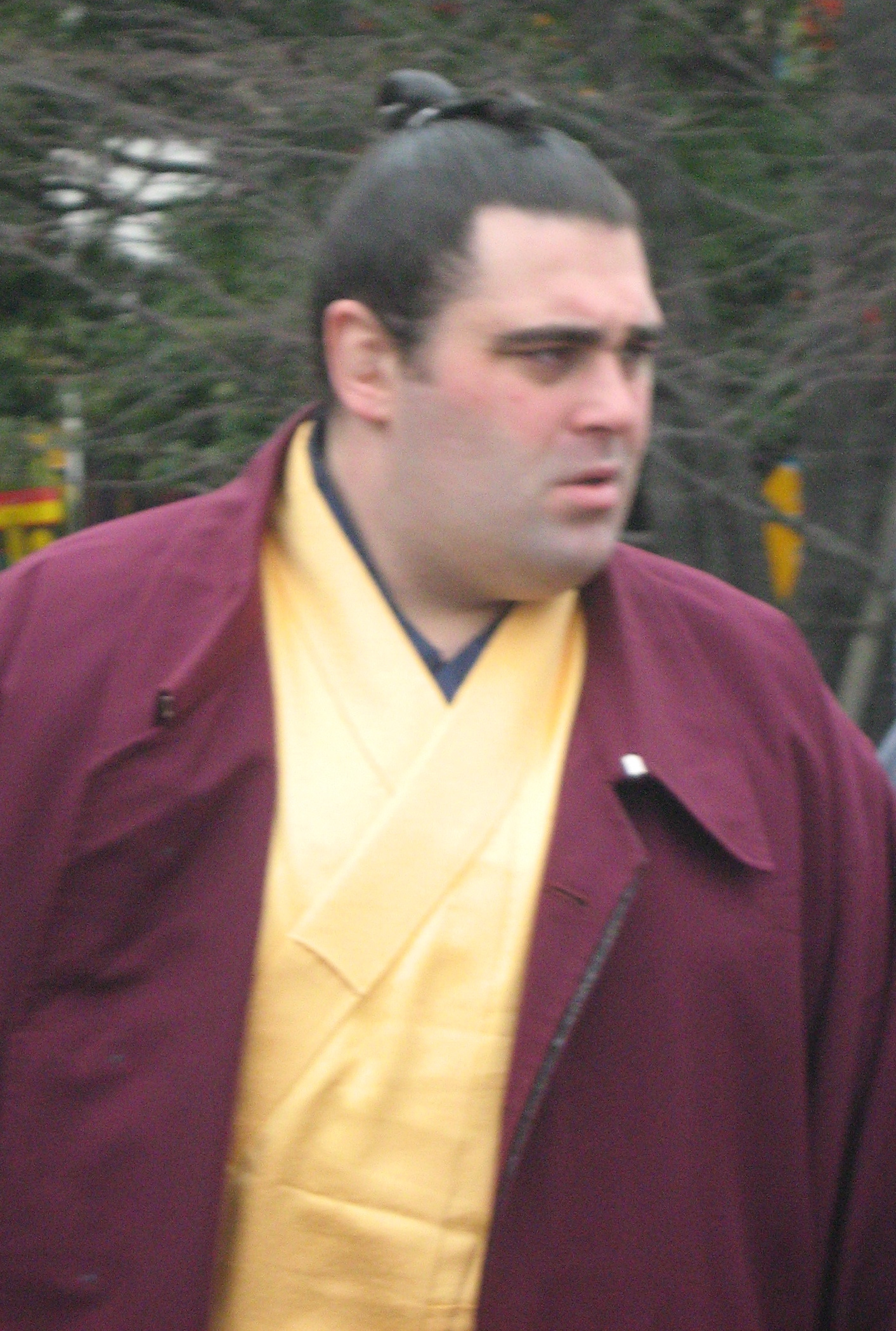
The makuuchi wrestler arriving for a tournament in January 2008.

Kokkai was born as Levan Tsaguria in Sukhumi, Abkhaz Autonomous Republic in then-Soviet Georgia. The secessionist war in Abkhazia forced his family to move to Tbilisi, capital of Georgia, in 1992. He started amateur wrestling from the age of six, being taught by his father who represented the Soviet Union in the sport. Levan enrolled in the National Academy of Sports of Georgia and quickly got interested in sumo, taking part in the World Amateur Sumo Championships in Riesa, Germany. In January 2001, he arrived in Tokyo, Japan, and joined a local sumo school.

He made his professional debut in May 2001, joining Oitekaze stable. His stablemaster, former maegashira Daishoyama, gave him the shikona, or ring name, of Kokkai, named after the word for Black Sea in Japanese. He quickly rose through the lower divisions, winning the jonidan and sandanme championships with perfect 7–0 records. Another tournament title in the makushita division in January 2003 followed by a 5–2 score at Makushita 1 saw him reach elite sekitori status in May 2003. After winning the jūryō division championship with a 14–1 record in November 2003 he was promoted to the top makuuchi division in January 2004, just 16 tournaments after his debut.

== Top division career ==
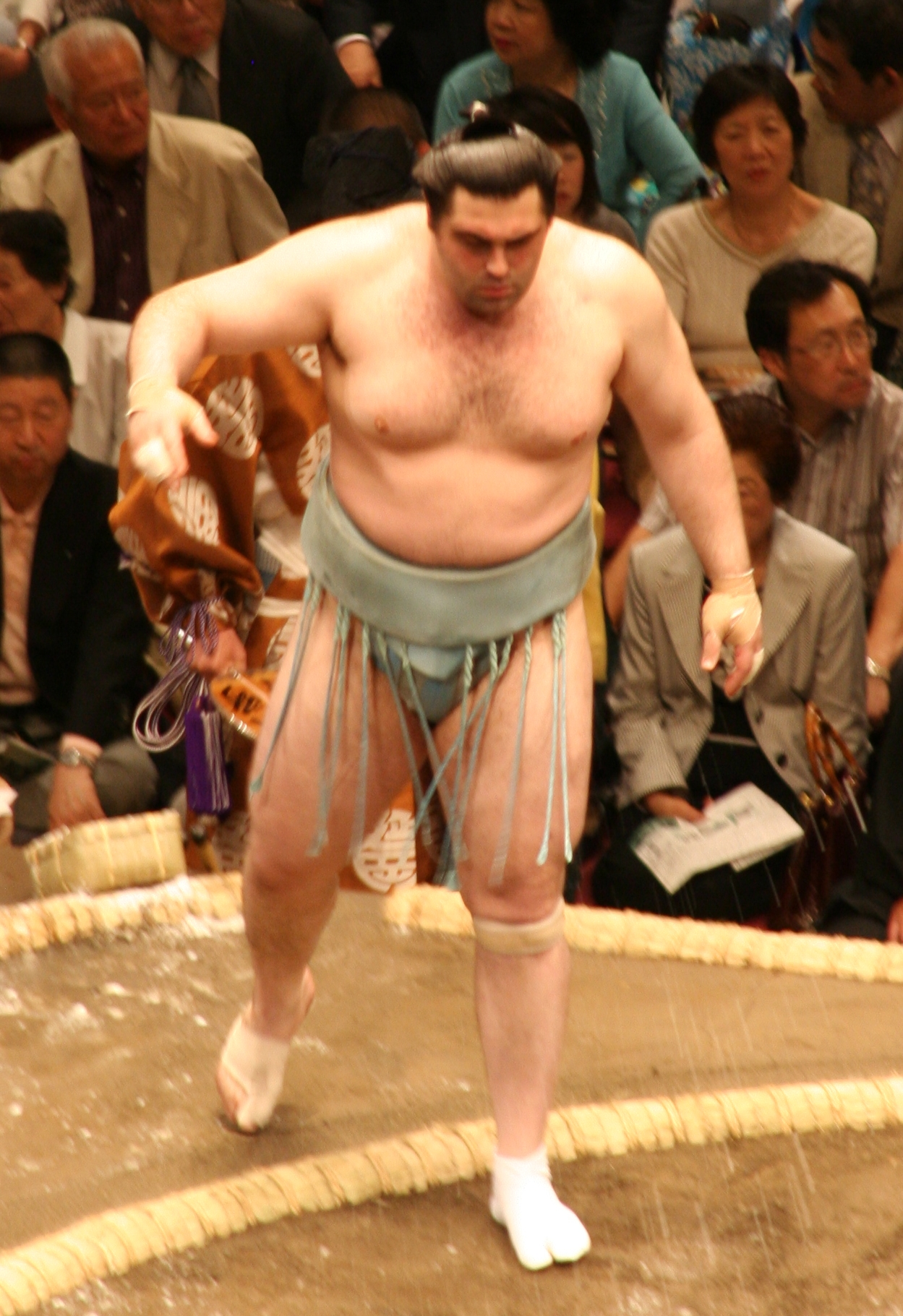
Kokkai in May 2007

Kokkai steadily climbed the maegashira ranks, reaching the #1 position in November 2004 before slipping back slightly. One of his best performances came in July 2005 when he defeated yokozuna Asashōryū for the first time, scored nine wins and was awarded the Fighting Spirit prize. He made his san'yaku debut in September 2006 at komusubi rank and held it with a solid 8–7 record, but he fell back to the maegashira ranks after a back injury restricted him to a poor 3–12 mark in November.

In March 2007 he turned in an impressive 10–5 score but he struggled again in May 2007, only managing three wins at the rank of maegashira 2. After another losing score in July of that year he fell to maegashira 12 in September, his lowest-ever top-division rank. He managed nine wins in November 2007, his first kachi-koshi, or winning score, since March.

After a solid 9–6 performance in January 2008, in the following tournament he produced his best-ever top-division result, a 12–3 score from the rank of maegashira 5, which earned him joint runner-up honours behind Asashōryū and his second Fighting Spirit prize. However, in the May 2008 tournament he could only manage three wins from the maegashira 1 ranking. Demoted to maegashira 10 for July, he struggled again, winning only five bouts. He was disqualified from his final match against Kimurayama after his was judged to have pulled his opponent's topknot, which is a kinjite, or foul. Kokkai maintained it was accidental as the tape on his fingers had stuck to Kimurayama's hair. He continued to move up and down the maegashira rankings in 2009, alternating between 8–7 and 5–10 records.

Having not missed a bout since his debut, in July 2010 he fought his 600th consecutive top-division match. Troubled by an elbow injury, he lost his top division status after the January 2011 tournament when he could only score 3–12 at maegashira 15, ending a run of 43 consecutive tournaments ranked in makuuchi. Back in jūryō for the May Technical Examination Tournament, he struggled to a 5–10 score. He returned to the top division in September 2011, but his stay was short-lived after a disastrous 1–14 performance in November. He was forced to pull out of the May 2012 tournament with an injury sustained in a defeat to Takanoyama on Day 10, breaking a run of 882 consecutive appearances since his professional debut in 2001, the most amongst active wrestlers. He was, however, able to return to the tournament and secured his majority of wins on the final day.

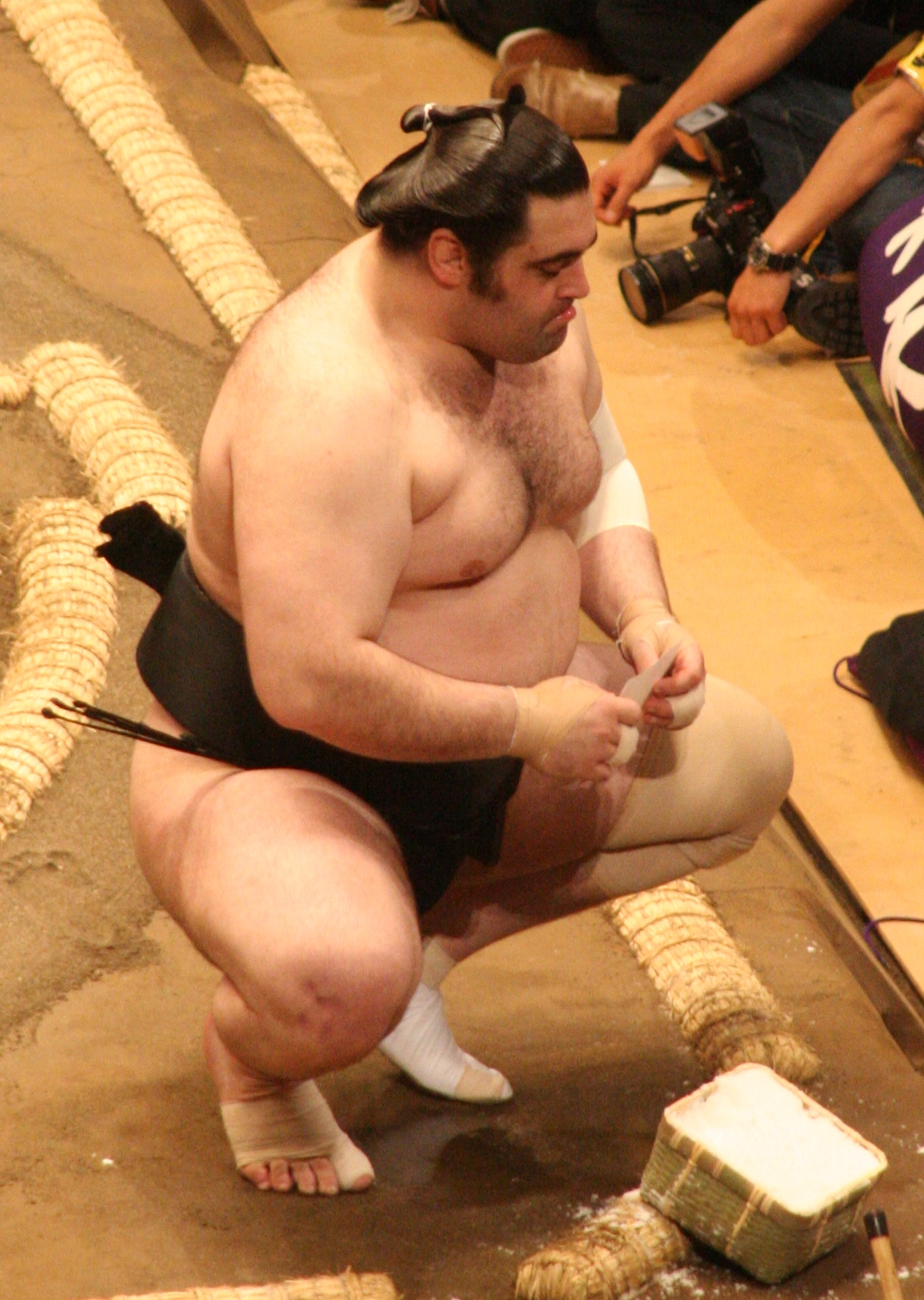
Kokkai in May 2009

Kokkai was joined in the top division by several wrestlers from Eastern Europe, including Kotoōshū from Bulgaria, Aran from Russia, and Baruto from Estonia. In May 2008 a fellow Georgian, Tochinoshin, was also promoted to makuuchi, and Kokkai defeated him in their first match that July. Kokkai is also good friends with former top-division wrestler Kakizoe.

He has knowledge of four languages: Georgian, Russian, English and Japanese.

He is a devout Christian and prays every day.

He would sometimes choose not to shave during a tournament for superstitious reasons and would therefore build up stubble, unusual for sumo wrestlers who are normally clean-shaven. He once also appeared with prominent sideburns for a few days, before he was told by his stablemaster to shave them off.

In 2010 he was awarded the Honor Medal by Georgian President Mikheil Saakashvili in recognition of raising the profile of his country abroad.

== Retirement from sumo ==
During the September 2012 tournament, Kokkai's stablemaster announced his retirement due to multiple injuries to his body over his sumo career, which had prevented him from training for the last few months. He went back to his native Georgia to work in the private sector. In April 2018 he was voted by unanimous decision to be the president of the Georgian Sumo Federation for a term of four years. Under his presidency, the Georgian association sent a delegation of young wrestlers to take part in the Hakuhō Cup on two occasions.

== Fighting style ==
Due to a neck injury, Kokkai was forced to change his sumo style. He began to fight more on the mawashi, gripping his opponent's belt, switching from the pushing and thrusting techniques he used earlier in his career. His profile at the Japan Sumo Association still lists tsuki/oshi as his favoured techniques, and his most common winning kimarite was oshi-dashi, or push-out, followed by yori-kiri, or force-out. He was also fond of using the slap-down (hataki-komi) and the pull-down (hiki-otoshi).

== Family ==
Kokkai's younger brother George also became a professional sumo wrestler in September 2005 under the name Tsukasaumi, but quit after just a year following the death of their mother, returning to Georgia to take over the family business.

Kokkai was married to a 22-year-old from his native country Georgia in August 2011.

== Career record ==
Kokkai Futoshi
Year	January Hatsu basho, Tokyo	March Haru basho, Osaka	May Natsu basho, Tokyo	July Nagoya basho, Nagoya	September Aki basho, Tokyo	November Kyūshū basho, Fukuoka
2001	x	x	(Maezumo)	East Jonokuchi #42; 6–1	East Jonidan #75; 6–1	East Jonidan #3; 7–0–P; Champion
2002	West Sandanme #14; 7–0; Champion	East Makushita #15; 3–4	West Makushita #21; 6–1	East Makushita #7; 5–2	West Makushita #1; 2–5	East Makushita #9; 4–3
2003	West Makushita #6; 6–1–PP; Champion	West Makushita #1; 5–2	West Jūryō #10; 8–7	East Jūryō #6; 9–6	East Jūryō #4; 9–6	West Jūryō #2; 14–1; Champion
2004	West Maegashira #10; 8–7	West Maegashira #9; 8–7	East Maegashira #7; 10–5	East Maegashira #2; 8–7	West Maegashira #1; 7–8	West Maegashira #2; 7–8
2005	West Maegashira #3; 7–8	East Maegashira #4; 9–6	East Maegashira #2; 5–10	East Maegashira #6; 9–6; F★	West Maegashira #2; 5–10	West Maegashira #6; 9–6
2006	West Maegashira #2; 8–7 ★	West Maegashira #1; 5–10	West Maegashira #6; 8–7	West Maegashira #5; 10–5	West Komusubi #1; 8–7	West Komusubi #1; 3–12
2007	West Maegashira #5; 7–8	East Maegashira #7; 10–5	East Maegashira #2; 3–12	West Maegashira #9; 6–9	East Maegashira #12; 7–8	East Maegashira #13; 9–6
2008	East Maegashira #9; 9–6	West Maegashira #5; 12–3; F	East Maegashira #1; 3–12	West Maegashira #10; 5–10	East Maegashira #16; 8–7	East Maegashira #11; 9–6
2009	West Maegashira #4; 5–10	West Maegashira #8; 5–10	East Maegashira #14; 8–7	East Maegashira #8; 5–10	East Maegashira #14; 8–7	West Maegashira #10; 8–7
2010	East Maegashira #9; 5–10	East Maegashira #14; 10–5	West Maegashira #6; 3–12	West Maegashira #12; 8–7	East Maegashira #8; 8–7	East Maegashira #6; 4–11
2011	East Maegashira #15; 3–12	Tournament Cancelled; 0–0–0	West Jūryō #6; 5–10	East Jūryō #4; 9–6	East Maegashira #16; 9–6	East Maegashira #10; 1–14
2012	East Jūryō #4; 7–8	West Jūryō #5; 4–11	West Jūryō #11; 8–6–1	East Jūryō #7; 4–11	East Jūryō #12; Retired; 0–3–9	x
Record given as wins–losses–absences Top division champion Top division runner-up Retired Lower divisions Non-participation Sanshō key: F=Fighting spirit; O=Outstanding performance; T=Technique Also shown: ★=Kinboshi; P=Playoff(s); Divisions: Makuuchi — Jūryō — Makushita — Sandanme — Jonidan — Jonokuchi Makuuchi ranks: Yokozuna — Ōzeki — Sekiwake — Komusubi — Maegashira

== See also ==
- List of sumo tournament top division runners-up
- List of sumo tournament second division champions
- Glossary of sumo terms
- List of non-Japanese sumo wrestlers
- List of past sumo wrestlers
- List of komusubi
