= Harunoyama Tatsunao =

Japanese sumo wrestler

Personal information
- Native name: 春ノ山 竜尚
- Born: Tatsunao Haruyama; 2 August 1976 (age 50) Toyota, Aichi, Japan
- Height: 1.88 m (6 ft 2 in)
- Weight: 177 kg (390 lb)

Sport
- Sport: Sumo
- Retired: November, 2006
- Heya: Matsugane
- Record: 426-410-52
- Debut: March, 1992
- Highest rank: Maegashira 10 (May, 2004)
- Elder name: Takenawa
- Championships: 1 (Makushita)
- Updated on June 25, 2020

Harunoyama Tatsunao (Japanese: 春ノ山 竜尚, born 2 August 1976), known as Tatsunao Haruyama is a former Japanese sumo wrestler from Toyota, Aichi. He made his professional debut in March 1992 and reached the top division in March 2004. His highest rank was maegashira 10. Upon retirement from active competition he became an elder in the Japan Sumo Association, under the name Takenawa. He left the Sumo Association in January 2008.

== Career record ==
Harunoyama Tatsunao
Year	January Hatsu basho, Tokyo	March Haru basho, Osaka	May Natsu basho, Tokyo	July Nagoya basho, Nagoya	September Aki basho, Tokyo	November Kyūshū basho, Fukuoka
1992	x	(Maezumo)	West Jonokuchi #9; 6–1	West Jonidan #78; 4–3	East Jonidan #53; 3–4	East Jonidan #73; 5–2
1993	East Jonidan #26; 4–3	West Jonidan #7; 3–4	East Jonidan #28; 5–2	West Sandanme #84; 3–4	East Jonidan #1; 4–3	East Sandanme #82; 5–2
1994	East Sandanme #54; 3–4	East Sandanme #74; 5–2	West Sandanme #42; 2–5	East Sandanme #69; 3–4	East Sandanme #89; 4–3	East Sandanme #71; 4–3
1995	East Sandanme #53; 4–3	West Sandanme #36; 4–3	West Sandanme #21; 5–2	West Makushita #56; 2–5	West Sandanme #20; 5–2	East Makushita #53; 3–4
1996	West Sandanme #4; 4–3	West Makushita #54; 4–3	East Makushita #44; 4–3	West Makushita #36; 4–3	East Makushita #25; 3–4	East Makushita #33; 3–4
1997	East Makushita #44; 3–4	West Makushita #53; 4–3	East Makushita #43; 3–4	West Makushita #53; 4–3	East Makushita #44; 3–4	West Makushita #53; 5–2
1998	East Makushita #32; 5–2	East Makushita #17; 4–3	West Makushita #13; 1–4–2	East Makushita #35; Sat out due to injury 0–0–7	East Makushita #35; 3–4	West Makushita #44; 5–2
1999	West Makushita #30; 5–2	West Makushita #16; 3–4	West Makushita #26; 4–3	East Makushita #19; 4–3	East Makushita #11; 4–3	East Makushita #6; 2–5
2000	West Makushita #20; 4–3	East Makushita #13; 4–3	West Makushita #10; 4–3	East Makushita #6; 4–3	East Makushita #4; 4–3	East Jūryō #13; 7–8
2001	West Makushita #1; 7–0; Champion	East Jūryō #8; 9–6	East Jūryō #4; 6–9	West Jūryō #9; 8–7	East Jūryō #7; 8–7	West Jūryō #6; 7–8
2002	West Jūryō #7; 6–9	East Jūryō #10; 9–6	West Jūryō #4; 5–6–4	East Jūryō #10; Sat out due to injury 0–0–15	East Jūryō #10; 6–9	West Jūryō #13; 9–6
2003	East Jūryō #9; 6–9	West Jūryō #10; 8–7	East Jūryō #7; 7–8	West Jūryō #8; 7–8	West Jūryō #8; 9–6	West Jūryō #5; 8–7
2004	East Jūryō #3; 10–5	East Maegashira #14; 9–6	East Maegashira #10; 4–11	East Maegashira #16; 3–12	East Jūryō #6; 8–7	East Jūryō #5; 11–4
2005	West Maegashira #15; Sat out due to injury 0–0–15	West Jūryō #10; 5–10	West Jūryō #12; 8–7	East Jūryō #7; 10–5	East Jūryō #1; 5–10	West Jūryō #6; 6–9
2006	West Jūryō #8; 7–8	East Jūryō #9; 5–10	West Jūryō #14; 8–7	East Jūryō #13; 5–10	West Makushita #4; 0–5–2	West Makushita #39; Retired; 0–0–4
Record given as wins–losses–absences Top division champion Top division runner-up Retired Lower divisions Non-participation Sanshō key: F=Fighting spirit; O=Outstanding performance; T=Technique Also shown: ★=Kinboshi; P=Playoff(s); Divisions: Makuuchi — Jūryō — Makushita — Sandanme — Jonidan — Jonokuchi Makuuchi ranks: Yokozuna — Ōzeki — Sekiwake — Komusubi — Maegashira

== See also ==
- Glossary of sumo terms
- List of past sumo wrestlers
