= 2005 in sumo =

The following are the events in professional sumo during 2005.

== Tournaments ==
=== Hatsu basho ===
Ryogoku Kokugikan, Tokyo, 9 January – 23 January

2005 Hatsu basho results - Makuuchi Division
| W | | L | | A | East | | | Rank | West | | | W | | L | | A |
|---|---|---|---|---|---|---|---|---|---|---|---|---|---|---|---|---|
| 15 | - | 0 | - | 0 | | (Mongolia) | **Asashōryū** | Y | ø | | | | | | | |
| 4 | - | 6 | - | 5 | ø | (Japan) | Kaiō | O | | (Japan) | **Chiyotaikai** | 8 | - | 7 | - | 0 |
| 6 | - | 9 | - | 0 | | (Japan) | Wakanosato | S | | (Japan) | **Miyabiyama** | 9 | - | 6 | - | 0 |
| | | | | | ø | | | S | | (Japan) | **Tochiazuma** | 11 | - | 4 | - | 0 |
| 7 | - | 8 | - | 0 | | (Japan) | Kotomitsuki | K | | (Mongolia) | **Hakuhō** | 11 | - | 4 | - | 0 |
| 8 | - | 7 | - | 0 | | (Japan) | **Iwakiyama** | M1 | | (Japan) | Tochinonada | 5 | - | 10 | - | 0 |
| 4 | - | 11 | - | 0 | | (Japan) | Kotonowaka | M2 | | (Japan) | Tosanoumi | 7 | - | 8 | - | 0 |
| 5 | - | 10 | - | 0 | | (Japan) | Tamanoshima | M3 | | (Georgia (country)) | Kokkai | 7 | - | 8 | - | 0 |
| 9 | - | 6 | - | 0 | | (Bulgaria) | **Kotoōshū** | M4 | | (Japan) | **Kakizoe** | 8 | - | 7 | - | 0 |
| 7 | - | 8 | - | 0 | | (Russia) | Rohō | M5 | | (Japan) | Takamisakari | 6 | - | 9 | - | 0 |
| 10 | - | 5 | - | 0 | | (Mongolia) | **Kyokutenhō** | M6 | | (Japan) | Kaihō | 5 | - | 10 | - | 0 |
| 8 | - | 7 | - | 0 | | (Japan) | **Hayateumi** | M7 | | (Japan) | Kotoryū | 4 | - | 11 | - | 0 |
| 8 | - | 7 | - | 0 | | (Japan) | **Hokutōriki** | M8 | ø | (Japan) | Takekaze | 0 | - | 0 | - | 15 |
| 6 | - | 9 | - | 0 | | (Japan) | Takanowaka | M9 | | (Japan) | **Shimotori** | 8 | - | 7 | - | 0 |
| 9 | - | 6 | - | 0 | | (Japan) | **Dejima** | M10 | | (Mongolia) | **Kyokushūzan** | 9 | - | 6 | - | 0 |
| 8 | - | 7 | - | 0 | | (Mongolia) | **Asasekiryū** | M11 | | (Japan) | **Jūmonji** | 9 | - | 6 | - | 0 |
| 5 | - | 10 | - | 0 | | (Japan) | Tokitsuumi | M12 | | (Japan) | Kisenosato | 6 | - | 9 | - | 0 |
| 8 | - | 6 | - | 1 | ø | (Mongolia) | **Ama** | M13 | | (Japan) | **Buyūzan** | 9 | - | 6 | - | 0 |
| 9 | - | 6 | - | 0 | | (South Korea) | **Kasugaō** | M14 | | (Japan) | Tamakasuga | 7 | - | 8 | - | 0 |
| 0 | - | 0 | - | 15 | ø | (Japan) | Tochisakae | M15 | ø | (Japan) | Harunoyama | 0 | - | 0 | - | 15 |
| 5 | - | 10 | - | 0 | | (Japan) | Kotoshōgiku | M16 | | (Japan) | Aminishiki | 7 | - | 8 | - | 0 |
| 8 | - | 7 | - | 0 | | (Japan) | **Toyonoshima** | M17 | | (Mongolia) | Tokitenkū | 6 | - | 9 | - | 0 |

ø - Indicates a pull-out or absent rank
**winning record in bold**
**Yusho Winner**

=== Haru basho ===
Osaka Prefectural Gymnasium, Osaka, 13 March – 27 March

2005 Haru basho results - Makuuchi Division
| W | | L | | A | East | | | Rank | West | | | W | | L | | A |
|---|---|---|---|---|---|---|---|---|---|---|---|---|---|---|---|---|
| 14 | - | 1 | - | 0 | | (Mongolia) | **Asashōryū** | Y | ø | | | | | | | |
| 6 | - | 9 | - | 0 | | (Japan) | Chiyotaikai | O | | (Japan) | **Kaiō** | 10 | - | 5 | - | 0 |
| | | | | | ø | | | O | | (Japan) | **Tochiazuma** | 10 | - | 5 | - | 0 |
| 5 | - | 10 | - | 0 | | (Japan) | Miyabiyama | S | | (Mongolia) | **Hakuhō** | 8 | - | 7 | - | 0 |
| 4 | - | 11 | - | 0 | | (Japan) | Iwakiyama | K | | (Bulgaria) | Kotoōshū | 4 | - | 11 | - | 0 |
| 6 | - | 9 | - | 0 | | (Mongolia) | Kyokutenhō | M1 | | (Japan) | **Wakanosato** | 8 | - | 7 | - | 0 |
| 9 | - | 6 | - | 0 | | (Japan) | **Kotomitsuki** | M2 | | (Japan) | Kakizoe | 6 | - | 9 | - | 0 |
| 10 | - | 5 | - | 0 | | (Japan) | **Tosanoumi** | M3 | ø | (Japan) | Hayateumi | 0 | - | 0 | - | 15 |
| 10 | - | 5 | - | 0 | | (Georgia (country)) | **Kokkai** | M4 | | (Japan) | **Tochinonada** | 8 | - | 7 | - | 0 |
| 7 | - | 8 | - | 0 | | (Japan) | Dejima | M5 | | (Japan) | Hokutōriki | 7 | - | 8 | - | 0 |
| 5 | - | 10 | - | 0 | | (Mongolia) | Kyokushūzan | M6 | | (Russia) | **Rohō** | 11 | - | 4 | - | 0 |
| 7 | - | 8 | - | 0 | | (Japan) | Jūmonji | M7 | | (Japan) | **Tamanoshima** | 12 | - | 3 | - | 0 |
| 2 | - | 10 | - | 3 | ø | (Japan) | Shimotori | M8 | | (Japan) | **Takamisakari** | 9 | - | 6 | - | 0 |
| 8 | - | 7 | - | 0 | | (Japan) | **Kotonowaka** | M9 | | (Mongolia) | **Asasekiryū** | 8 | - | 7 | - | 0 |
| 6 | - | 9 | - | 0 | | (Japan) | Buyūzan | M10 | | (Japan) | **Kaihō** | 11 | - | 4 | - | 0 |
| 1 | - | 14 | - | 0 | | (South Korea) | Kasugaō | M11 | | (Mongolia) | **Ama** | 9 | - | 6 | - | 0 |
| 7 | - | 8 | - | 0 | | (Japan) | Takanowaka | M12 | ø | (Japan) | Kotoryū | 0 | - | 4 | - | 11 |
| 7 | - | 8 | - | 0 | | (Japan) | Toyonoshima | M13 | | (Japan) | **Futen'ō** | 8 | - | 7 | - | 0 |
| 1 | - | 3 | - | 11 | ø | (Japan) | Kasuganishiki | M14 | | (Japan) | **Toyozakura** | 8 | - | 7 | - | 0 |
| 7 | - | 8 | - | 0 | | (Japan) | Tamakasuga | M15 | | (Japan) | **Kisenosato** | 8 | - | 7 | - | 0 |
| 8 | - | 7 | - | 0 | | (Japan) | **Tokitsuumi** | M16 | | (Japan) | Ōtsukasa | 4 | - | 11 | - | 0 |
| 6 | - | 9 | - | 0 | | (Japan) | Ishide | M17 | | (Japan) | **Aminishiki** | 9 | - | 6 | - | 0 |

ø - Indicates a pull-out or absent rank
**winning record in bold**
**Yusho Winner**

=== Natsu basho ===
Ryogoku Kokugikan, Tokyo, 8 May – 22 May

2005 Natsu basho results - Makuuchi Division
| W | | L | | A | East | | | Rank | West | | | W | | L | | A |
|---|---|---|---|---|---|---|---|---|---|---|---|---|---|---|---|---|
| 15 | - | 0 | - | 0 | | (Mongolia) | **Asashōryū** | Y | ø | | | | | | | |
| 5 | - | 1 | - | 9 | ø | (Japan) | Kaiō | O | | (Japan) | **Tochiazuma** | 12 | - | 3 | - | 0 |
| | | | | | ø | | | O | | (Japan) | **Chiyotaikai** | 10 | - | 5 | - | 0 |
| 9 | - | 6 | - | 0 | | (Mongolia) | **Hakuhō** | S | | (Japan) | Tosanoumi | 4 | - | 11 | - | 0 |
| 13 | - | 2 | - | 0 | | (Japan) | **Kotomitsuki** | K | | (Japan) | Wakanosato | 6 | - | 9 | - | 0 |
| 5 | - | 10 | - | 0 | | (Japan) | Tamanoshima | M1 | | (Russia) | Rohō | 7 | - | 8 | - | 0 |
| 5 | - | 10 | - | 0 | | (Georgia (country)) | Kokkai | M2 | | (Japan) | Tochinonada | 5 | - | 10 | - | 0 |
| 8 | - | 7 | - | 0 | | (Japan) | **Miyabiyama** | M3 | | (Mongolia) | Kyokutenhō | 6 | - | 9 | - | 0 |
| 4 | - | 11 | - | 0 | | (Japan) | Kaihō | M4 | | (Japan) | Iwakiyama | 5 | - | 10 | - | 0 |
| 10 | - | 5 | - | 0 | | (Bulgaria) | **Kotoōshū** | M5 | | (Japan) | **Kakizoe** | 9 | - | 6 | - | 0 |
| 9 | - | 6 | - | 0 | | (Japan) | **Dejima** | M6 | | (Japan) | **Hokutōriki** | 8 | - | 7 | - | 0 |
| 5 | - | 10 | - | 0 | | (Japan) | Takamisakari | M7 | | (Japan) | Jūmonji | 6 | - | 9 | - | 0 |
| 8 | - | 7 | - | 0 | | (Japan) | **Kotonowaka** | M8 | | (Mongolia) | **Asasekiryū** | 8 | - | 7 | - | 0 |
| 8 | - | 7 | - | 0 | | (Mongolia) | **Ama** | M9 | | (Mongolia) | **Kyokushūzan** | 12 | - | 3 | - | 0 |
| 11 | - | 4 | - | 0 | | (Japan) | **Futen'ō** | M10 | | (Japan) | Toyozakura | 4 | - | 11 | - | 0 |
| 8 | - | 7 | - | 0 | | (Japan) | **Aminishiki** | M11 | | (Japan) | Kisenosato | 5 | - | 10 | - | 0 |
| 6 | - | 9 | - | 0 | | (Japan) | Buyūzan | M12 | | (Japan) | Tokitsuumi | 3 | - | 12 | - | 0 |
| 5 | - | 10 | - | 0 | | (Japan) | Takanowaka | M13 | | (Japan) | Toyonoshima | 6 | - | 9 | - | 0 |
| 10 | - | 5 | - | 0 | | (Japan) | **Kotoshōgiku** | M14 | ø | (Japan) | Hayateumi | 3 | - | 4 | - | 8 |
| 9 | - | 6 | - | 0 | | (Japan) | **Takekaze** | M15 | | (Mongolia) | **Tokitenkū** | 8 | - | 7 | - | 0 |
| 8 | - | 7 | - | 0 | | (Japan) | **Tamakasuga** | M16 | | (Japan) | **Katayama** | 8 | - | 7 | - | 0 |
| 5 | - | 10 | - | 0 | | (Japan) | Shimotori | M17 | | (Japan) | Tōki | 6 | - | 9 | - | 0 |

ø - Indicates a pull-out or absent rank
**winning record in bold**
**Yusho Winner**

=== Nagoya basho ===
Aichi Prefectural Gymnasium, Nagoya, 10 July – 24 July

2005 Nagoya basho results - Makuuchi Division
| W | | L | | A | East | | | Rank | West | | | W | | L | | A |
|---|---|---|---|---|---|---|---|---|---|---|---|---|---|---|---|---|
| 13 | - | 2 | - | 0 | | (Mongolia) | **Asashōryū** | Y | ø | | | | | | | |
| 9 | - | 6 | - | 0 | | (Japan) | **Tochiazuma** | O | ø | (Japan) | Chiyotaikai | 3 | - | 6 | - | 6 |
| | | | | | ø | | | O | | (Japan) | **Kaiō** | 10 | - | 5 | - | 0 |
| 6 | - | 3 | - | 6 | ø | (Mongolia) | Hakuhō | S | | (Japan) | Kotomitsuki | 7 | - | 8 | - | 0 |
| 12 | - | 3 | - | 0 | | (Bulgaria) | **Kotoōshū** | K | | (Japan) | Miyabiyama | 7 | - | 8 | - | 0 |
| 7 | - | 8 | - | 0 | | (Japan) | Kakizoe | M1 | | (Mongolia) | Kyokushūzan | 5 | - | 10 | - | 0 |
| 7 | - | 8 | - | 0 | | (Japan) | Dejima | M2 | | (Japan) | **Wakanosato** | 11 | - | 4 | - | 0 |
| 3 | - | 8 | - | 4 | ø | (Russia) | Rohō | M3 | | (Japan) | **Futen'ō** | 10 | - | 5 | - | 0 |
| 5 | - | 10 | - | 0 | | (Japan) | Tosanoumi | M4 | | (Japan) | Tamanoshima | 5 | - | 10 | - | 0 |
| 6 | - | 9 | - | 0 | | (Japan) | Hokutōriki | M5 | | (Mongolia) | **Kyokutenhō** | 8 | - | 7 | - | 0 |
| 9 | - | 6 | - | 0 | | (Georgia (country)) | **Kokkai** | M6 | ø | (Japan) | Tochinonada | 0 | - | 2 | - | 13 |
| 4 | - | 11 | - | 0 | | (Japan) | Kotonowaka | M7 | ø | (Mongolia) | Asasekiryū | 6 | - | 7 | - | 2 |
| 6 | - | 9 | - | 0 | | (Mongolia) | Ama | M8 | ø | (Japan) | **Iwakiyama** | 9 | - | 3 | - | 3 |
| 8 | - | 7 | - | 0 | | (Japan) | **Kotoshōgiku** | M9 | | (Japan) | **Aminishiki** | 9 | - | 6 | - | 0 |
| 8 | - | 7 | - | 0 | | (Japan) | **Kaihō** | M10 | | (Japan) | Jūmonji | 5 | - | 10 | - | 0 |
| 8 | - | 7 | - | 0 | | (Japan) | **Takekaze** | M11 | | (Japan) | **Takamisakari** | 10 | - | 5 | - | 0 |
| 9 | - | 6 | - | 0 | | (Mongolia) | **Tokitenkū** | M12 | | (Japan) | Tochisakae | 7 | - | 8 | - | 0 |
| 0 | - | 3 | - | 12 | ø | (Japan) | Tamakasuga | M13 | | (Japan) | Katayama | 4 | - | 11 | - | 0 |
| 9 | - | 6 | - | 0 | | (Japan) | **Tamaasuka** | M14 | | (Russia) | **Hakurozan** | 8 | - | 7 | - | 0 |
| 4 | - | 11 | - | 0 | | (Japan) | Buyūzan | M15 | | (Japan) | Kisenosato | 7 | - | 8 | - | 0 |
| 6 | - | 9 | - | 0 | | (Japan) | Toyonoshima | M16 | | (Japan) | **Toyozakura** | 9 | - | 6 | - | 0 |
| 9 | - | 6 | - | 0 | | (Japan) | **Ishide** | M17 | | (Japan) | **Takanowaka** | 8 | - | 7 | - | 0 |

ø - Indicates a pull-out or absent rank
**winning record in bold**
**Yusho Winner**

=== Aki basho ===
Ryogoku Kokugikan, Tokyo, 11 September – 25 September

2005 Aki basho results - Makuuchi Division
| W | | L | | A | East | | | Rank | West | | | W | | L | | A |
|---|---|---|---|---|---|---|---|---|---|---|---|---|---|---|---|---|
| 13 | - | 2 | - | 0 | | (Mongolia) | **Asashōryū*** | Y | ø | | | | | | | |
| 0 | - | 4 | - | 11 | ø | (Japan) | Kaiō | O | | (Japan) | **Tochiazuma** | 10 | - | 5 | - | 0 |
| | | | | | ø | | | O | | (Japan) | **Chiyotaikai** | 10 | - | 5 | - | 0 |
| 13 | - | 2 | - | 0 | | (Bulgaria) | **Kotoōshū** | S | ø | (Japan) | Wakanosato | 4 | - | 3 | - | 8 |
| 9 | - | 6 | - | 0 | | (Japan) | **Kotomitsuki** | K | | (Japan) | Futen'ō | 5 | - | 10 | - | 0 |
| 6 | - | 9 | - | 0 | | (Japan) | Miyabiyama | M1 | | (Mongolia) | **Hakuhō** | 9 | - | 6 | - | 0 |
| 7 | - | 8 | - | 0 | | (Japan) | Kakizoe | M2 | | (Georgia (country)) | Kokkai | 5 | - | 10 | - | 0 |
| 7 | - | 8 | - | 0 | | (Japan) | Dejima | M3 | | (Mongolia) | **Kyokutenhō** | 10 | - | 5 | - | 0 |
| 7 | - | 8 | - | 0 | | (Japan) | Iwakiyama | M4 | | (Mongolia) | Kyokushūzan | 4 | - | 11 | - | 0 |
| 5 | - | 10 | - | 0 | | (Japan) | Takamisakari | M5 | | (Japan) | Aminishiki | 7 | - | 8 | - | 0 |
| 7 | - | 8 | - | 0 | | (Japan) | Kotoshōgiku | M6 | | (Mongolia) | Tokitenkū | 7 | - | 8 | - | 0 |
| 8 | - | 7 | - | 0 | | (Japan) | **Hokutōriki** | M7 | ø | (Japan) | Kaihō | 0 | - | 0 | - | 15 |
| 6 | - | 9 | - | 0 | | (Japan) | Tosanoumi | M8 | | (Japan) | **Tamanoshima** | 11 | - | 4 | - | 0 |
| 7 | - | 8 | - | 0 | | (Japan) | Takekaze | M9 | | (Japan) | Tamaasuka | 4 | - | 11 | - | 0 |
| 6 | - | 2 | - | 7 | ø | (Mongolia) | Asasekiryū | M10 | | (Russia) | **Rohō** | 8 | - | 7 | - | 0 |
| 9 | - | 6 | - | 0 | | (Mongolia) | **Ama** | M11 | | (Japan) | Toyozakura | 4 | - | 11 | - | 0 |
| 7 | - | 8 | - | 0 | | (Russia) | Hakurozan | M12 | | (Japan) | Ishide | 7 | - | 8 | - | 0 |
| 8 | - | 7 | - | 0 | | (Japan) | **Kotonowaka** | M13 | | (Japan) | Tochisakae | 5 | - | 10 | - | 0 |
| 6 | - | 9 | - | 0 | | (Japan) | Jūmonji | M14 | | (Japan) | Tokitsuumi | 4 | - | 11 | - | 0 |
| 9 | - | 6 | - | 0 | | (Japan) | **Takanowaka** | M15 | | (Japan) | **Wakatoba** | 8 | - | 7 | - | 0 |
| 7 | - | 8 | - | 0 | | (South Korea) | Kasugaō | M16 | | (Japan) | **Kisenosato** | 12 | - | 3 | - | 0 |
| 7 | - | 8 | - | 0 | | (Japan) | Tochinonada | M17 | | (Japan) | **Shimotori** | 8 | - | 7 | - | 0 |

ø - Indicates a pull-out or absent rank
**winning record in bold**
**Yusho Winner**
***Won Playoff**

=== Kyushu basho ===
Fukuoka International Centre, Kyushu, 13 November – 27 November

2005 Kyushu basho results - Makuuchi Division
| W | | L | | A | East | | | Rank | West | | | W | | L | | A |
|---|---|---|---|---|---|---|---|---|---|---|---|---|---|---|---|---|
| 14 | - | 1 | - | 0 | | (Mongolia) | **Asashōryū** | Y | ø | | | | | | | |
| 2 | - | 2 | - | 11 | ø | (Japan) | Tochiazuma | O | | (Japan) | **Chiyotaikai** | 11 | - | 4 | - | 0 |
| | | | | | ø | | | O | | (Japan) | **Kaiō** | 10 | - | 5 | - | 0 |
| 11 | - | 4 | - | 0 | | (Bulgaria) | **Kotoōshū** | S | | (Japan) | **Kotomitsuki** | 8 | - | 7 | - | 0 |
| 8 | - | 7 | - | 0 | | (Mongolia) | **Kyokutenhō** | K | | (Mongolia) | **Hakuhō** | 9 | - | 6 | - | 0 |
| 8 | - | 7 | - | 0 | | (Japan) | **Tamanoshima** | M1 | | (Japan) | Hokutōriki | 2 | - | 13 | - | 0 |
| 3 | - | 12 | - | 0 | | (Japan) | Futen'ō | M2 | | (Japan) | Kakizoe | 4 | - | 11 | - | 0 |
| 0 | - | 0 | - | 15 | ø | (Japan) | Wakanosato | M3 | | (Japan) | Dejima | 5 | - | 10 | - | 0 |
| 10 | - | 5 | - | 0 | | (Japan) | **Miyabiyama** | M4 | | (Japan) | Iwakiyama | 7 | - | 8 | - | 0 |
| 5 | - | 10 | - | 0 | | (Japan) | Kisenosato | M5 | | (Mongolia) | Ama | 7 | - | 8 | - | 0 |
| 7 | - | 8 | - | 0 | | (Japan) | Aminishiki | M6 | | (Georgia (country)) | **Kokkai** | 9 | - | 6 | - | 0 |
| 6 | - | 9 | - | 0 | | (Japan) | Kotoshōgiku | M7 | | (Mongolia) | **Tokitenkū** | 10 | - | 5 | - | 0 |
| 10 | - | 5 | - | 0 | | (Russia) | **Rohō** | M8 | | (Japan) | Toyonoshima | 7 | - | 8 | - | 0 |
| 7 | - | 8 | - | 0 | | (Japan) | Takamisakari | M9 | | (Japan) | **Takekaze** | 9 | - | 6 | - | 0 |
| 7 | - | 8 | - | 0 | | (Mongolia) | Kyokushūzan | M10 | ø | (Japan) | Takanowaka | 1 | - | 11 | - | 3 |
| 5 | - | 10 | - | 0 | | (Japan) | Tosanoumi | M11 | | (Japan) | Kotonowaka | 5 | - | 10 | - | 0 |
| 5 | - | 10 | - | 0 | | (Japan) | Wakatoba | M12 | | (Mongolia) | **Asasekiryū** | 9 | - | 6 | - | 0 |
| 10 | - | 5 | - | 0 | | (Russia) | **Hakurozan** | M13 | | (Japan) | Shunketsu | 6 | - | 9 | - | 0 |
| 11 | - | 4 | - | 0 | | (Japan) | **Tochinohana** | M14 | ø | (Japan) | Shimotori | 0 | - | 0 | - | 15 |
| 9 | - | 6 | - | 0 | | (Japan) | **Kasuganishiki** | M15 | ø | (Japan) | Tamaasuka | 0 | - | 5 | - | 10 |
| 7 | - | 8 | - | 0 | | (Japan) | Katayama | M16 | | (South Korea) | **Kasugaō** | 8 | - | 7 | - | 0 |
| 9 | - | 6 | - | 0 | | (Japan) | **Jūmonji** | M17 | | (Japan) | Tochinonada | 7 | - | 8 | - | 0 |

ø - Indicates a pull-out or absent rank
**winning record in bold**
**Yusho Winner**

== News ==
=== January ===
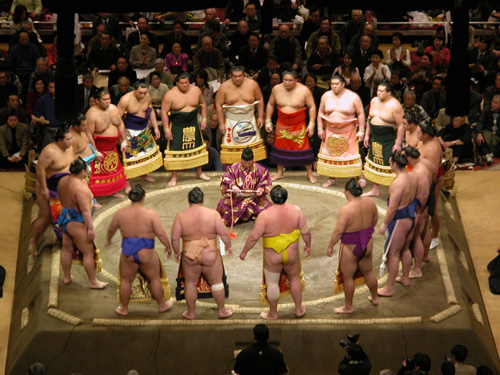
Top division wrestlers perform their ring-entering ceremony during the January 2005 tournament

- 9: The New Year tournament in Tokyo begins with Emperor Akihito and Empress Michiko among a sell-out crowd. Attention is focused on ozeki Kaio, who after winning the September 2004 tournament and finishing runner-up in November, still has a chance of yokozuna promotion. He is however, reportedly in poor condition.
- 18: Kaio, with five losses already, decides to withdraw due to left shoulder trouble.
- 23: Yokozuna Asashoryu wins the tournament with an unbeaten 15–0 record for his 10th championship. His victory had been decided on the 13th day. New komusubi Hakuho finishes runner-up, four wins behind, on 11–4 and is awarded the Technique Prize. Sekiwake Tochiazuma returns to the ozeki rank after also scoring 11. He had lost his ozeki status after being injured during the previous two tournaments. It is the second time he has regained his ozeki status in this way and he becomes the first wrestler to achieve it more than once. Takekaze, Tochisakae and Harunoyama all miss the tournament though injury and lose their top division status. Kotoshogiku and Tokitenku are also demoted. In the second highest juryo division, Otsukasa wins his second championship and returns to the top makuuchi division. Chiyohakuho wins the makushita division championship. Future top division stars Tochiozan, Goeido and Toyohibiki all make their professional debuts, fighting under their family names.

=== March ===
- At the Haru basho in Osaka, Asashoryu continues his championship streak with a 3rd consecutive yusho, and 11th overall, with a 14–1 record. Tochiazuma, who scores 10–5, is the only man to defeat him. Maegashira Tamanoshima is runner-up on 12–3 and gets the Fighting Spirit Prize. Veteran former komusubi Kaiho scores eleven and receives his second Technique Prize, which he shares with Ama. New sekiwake Hakuho, the second youngest man ever after Takanohana to reach the third highest rank, gets his majority of wins with 8–7. Kotoshogiku makes an immediate return to the top division after winning the juryo championship with a 13–2 record. Former maegashira Wakakosho retires.
- Oshiogawa stable shuts down, with its stablemaster and wrestlers moving to Oguruma stable.
- Promotions to the juryo division for the May tournament are announced. Amongst them is the 34-year-old Dewanosato, who began his sumo career in 1986. The 114 tournaments it took him to reach juryo is the most in sumo history.

=== May ===
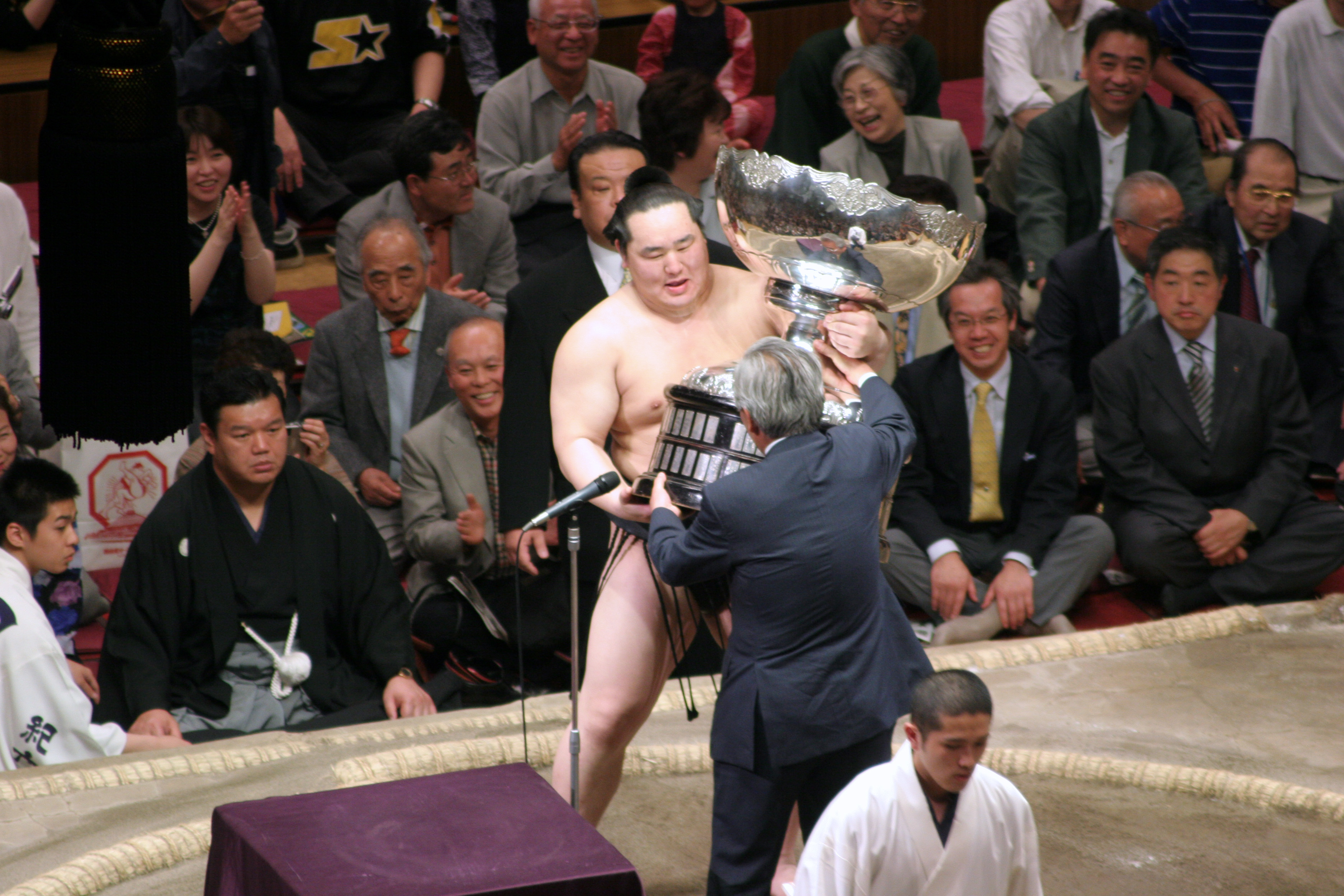
Asashōryū receives the Prime Minister's Award for winning the May 2005 tournament

- At the Natsu basho in Tokyo, Asashoryu achieves an undefeated record in his continuing championship streak, taking his 12th overall. Runner-up is komusubi Kotomitsuki who scores 13–2 and wins his sixth Technique Award. Tochiazuma finishes with a fine 12–3 record. Chiyotaikai, who was kadoban (in danger of demotion from ozeki) for the seventh time, tying Konishiki's record, wins ten. Kaio drops out through injury again. Kyokushuzan and Futeno each win their first Fighting Spirit prize. Tochisakae wins the juryo championship, and Ushiomaru the makushita championship. Former makuuchi veterans Kotoryu and Asanowaka retire.

=== July ===
- At the Nagoya basho, Asashoryu takes the tournament with a 13–2 record, and wins five consecutive championships for the first time. It is his 13th overall win. During the tournament he is defeated by new komusubi Kotoōshū of Bulgaria, who finishes as runner-up on 12–3 and is awarded the Outstanding Performance Prize, and Kokkai of Georgia, who gets the Fighting Spirit Award. Chiyotaikai and Hakuho both withdraw through injury, but Kaio preserves his ozeki status with a 10–5 score. Futeno also wins ten and receives the Technique Award as well as promotion to the sanyaku ranks next time. Tokitsuumi wins the juryo division championship and returns to the top division.

=== September ===
- At the Aki basho in Tokyo, Asashoryu wins his sixth consecutive championship, tying Taiho for this distinction (who managed it on two separate occasions). The championship is closely contested, however, as sekiwake Kotooshu wins his first twelve matches while Asashoryu suffers defeats to new komusubi Futeno on Day 1 (his first ever opening day loss as a yokozuna) and to Aminishiki on Day 11, to trail Kotooshu by two on 10–2. However, Asashoryu is victorious when they meet on Day 13, and Kotooshu suffers a second straight defeat to Kisenosato on Day 14. When both men finish on 13–2 on the final day Asashoryu wins the resulting playoff to claim his 14th championship. Kotooshu receives the Fighting Spirit prize for his efforts and is told that another good performance in November will give him promotion to ozeki. Kisenosato also gets the Fighting Spirit prize, his first sansho. Kaio withdraws early once again. Kaiho misses the tournament and drops to juryo. Toyonoshima wins the juryo championship with a 14–1 record and returns to makuuchi. Wakakirin wins the makushita championship. In the jonidan division, 17-year-old Russian Wakanoho wins the yusho. Former komusubi Wakanoyama, who began his career in the same tournament as Takanohana, Wakanohana and Akebono in March 1988, retires.

=== October ===
- 7–10: The Sumo Association holds a three-day exhibition tournament in Las Vegas. Roughly 25,000 spectators attend.

=== November ===
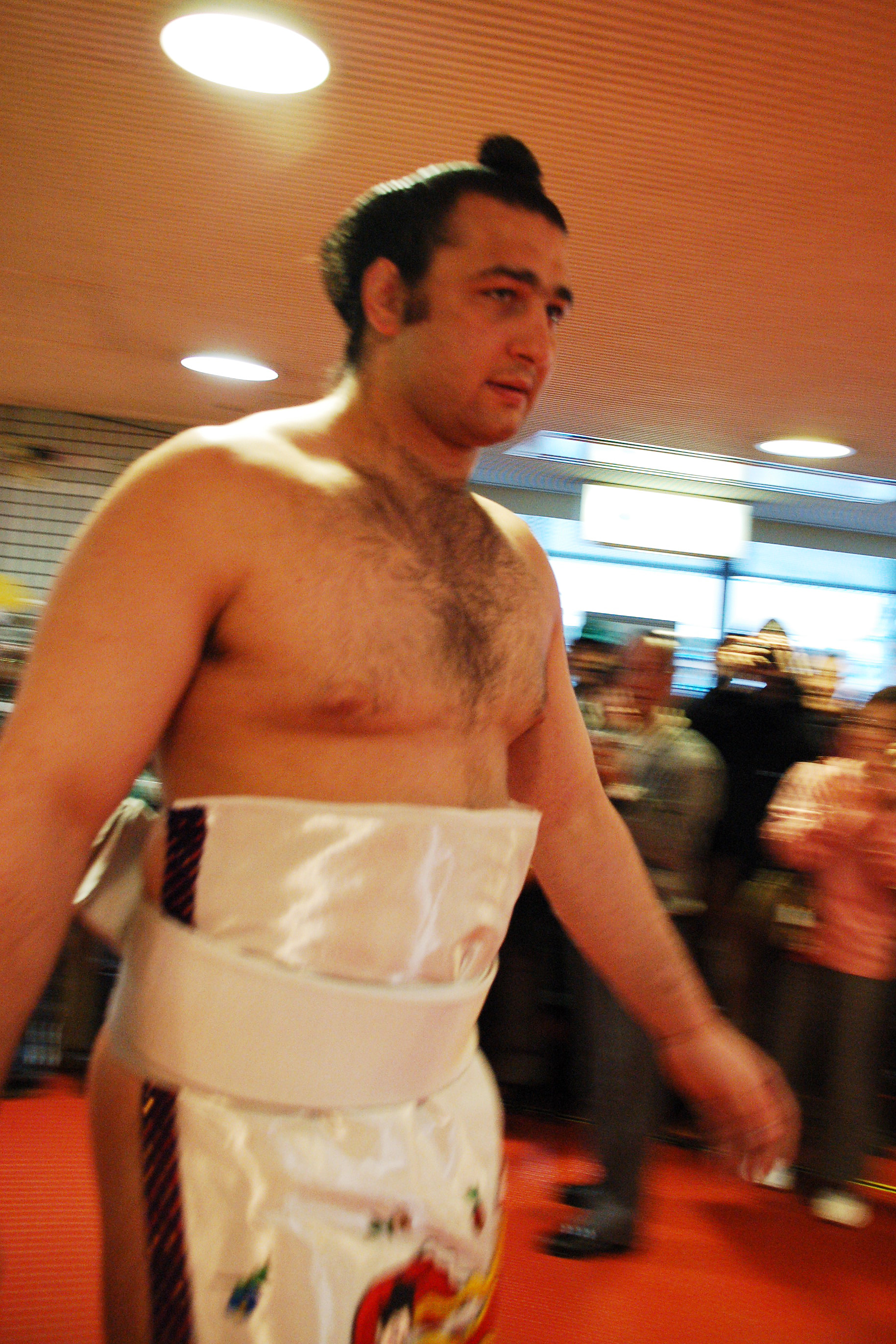
Kotooshu became the first European ozeki after the November tournament.

- At the Kyushu basho, Asashoryu wins the tournament and achieves a "triple crown" of three all-time records: seven straight championships, winning 84 out of 90 regulation bouts contested in one year, and pulling off a Grand Slam – the first time a rikishi has won all six tournaments in a calendar year. His only defeat in this basho is to Kotooshu who is runner-up alongside Chiyotaikai and Tochinohana with a score of 11–4. He wins the Outstanding performance and Fighting Spirit prizes, and more importantly promotion to ozeki. Kotooshu is the fifth foreigner, and first European, to reach the second highest rank. Tochinohana and Miyabiyama also share the Fighting Spirit prize, while Tokitenku wins the Technique award. Kotooshu's stablemaster, former yokozuna Kotozakura, reaches the mandatory oyakata retirement age of 65 on the 14th day and is immediately replaced as head of the Sadogatake stable by his son-in-law Kotonowaka, who announces his retirement from active competition at the age of 37 after 21 years in sumo and 90 top division tournaments. Former maegashira Yotsukasa and Gojoro also retire, Yotsukasa after losing 14 straight bouts in the juryo division, and Gojoro after falling to makushita 55 through injury. The juryo yusho goes to veteran Toki. By contrast, the makushita and sandanme championships are won by youngsters Sawai, now Goeido, and Kageyama, now known as Tochiozan.

== Deaths ==
- 16 May: former juryo 10 Daiki, real name Percy Kipapa, is murdered in Kahaluu, Hawaii at the age of 31.
- 30 May: former ozeki Takanohana, father of Takanohana II and Wakanohana III and former head of Futagoyama stable, dies of mouth cancer aged 55.

== See also ==
- Glossary of sumo terms
- List of active sumo wrestlers
- List of past sumo wrestlers
- List of years in sumo
- List of yokozuna
