= Asasekiryū Tarō =

Sumo wrestler

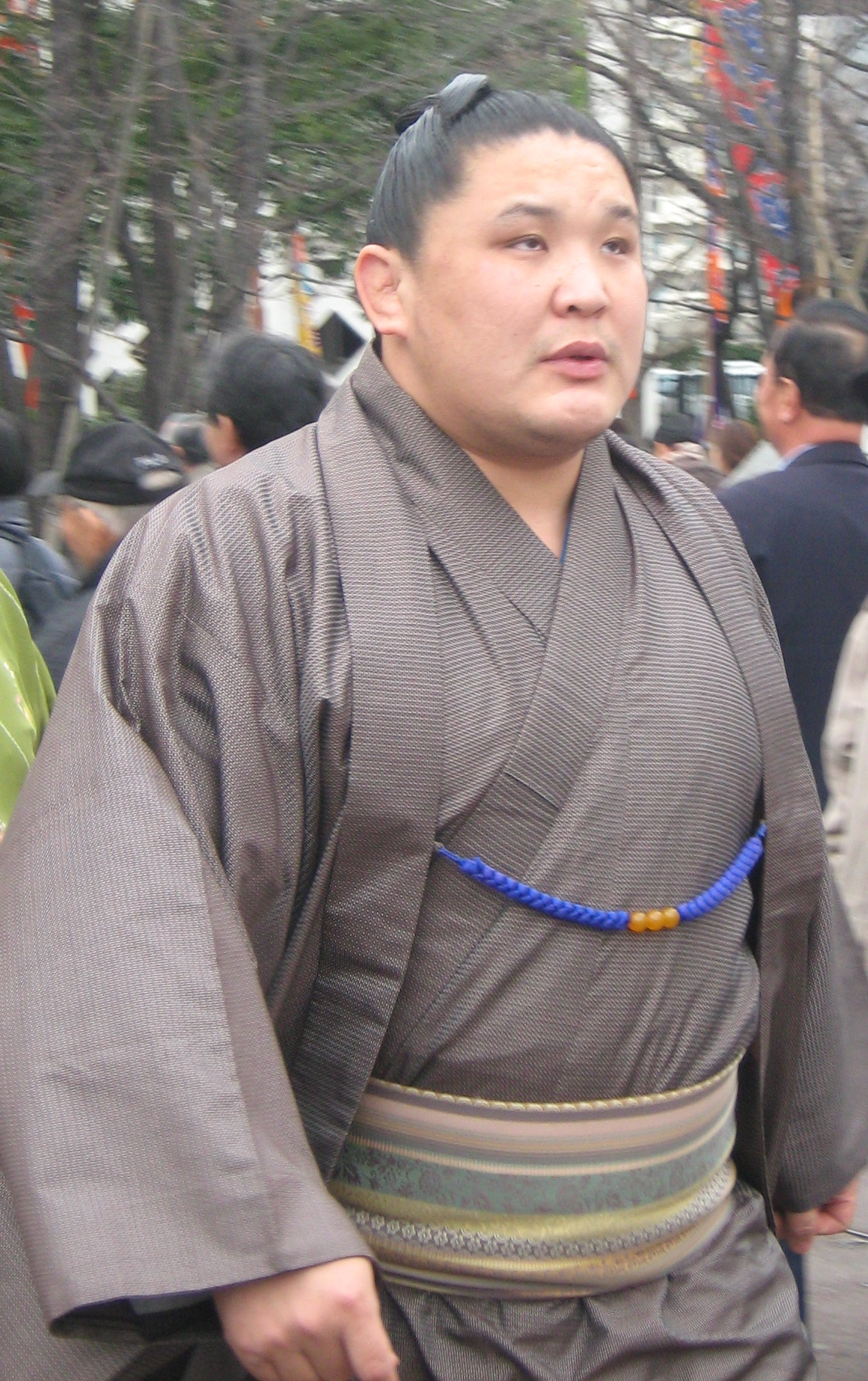
- Tarō in 2008

Personal information
- Native name: 朝赤龍 太郎
- Born: Badarchiin Dashnyam; August 7, 1981 (age 45) Ulaanbaatar, Mongolia
- Height: 1.84 m (6 ft 1/2 in)
- Weight: 148 kg (326 lb; 23.3 st)

Sport
- Sport: Sumo
- Retired: May, 2017
- Heya: Wakamatsu → Takasago
- Record: 687-679-36
- Debut: January, 2000
- Highest rank: Sekiwake (September, 2007)
- Elder name: Takasago
- Championships: 1 (Jūryō); 1 (Jonidan)
- Special Prizes: Outstanding Performance (1); Fighting Spirit (1); Technique (2)
- Updated on May 12, 2017

Asasekiryū Tarō (born Badarchiin Dashnyam, Mongolian: Бадарчийн Дашням; August 7, 1981) is a Mongolian-Japanese former sumo wrestler. He made his debut in January 2000, reaching the top makuuchi division in March 2003. He won four special prizes, and spent a total of five tournaments in the titled san'yaku ranks. The highest rank was sekiwake. He was a runner-up in two tournaments in 2004 and 2007. After 2013 he was mainly ranked in the lower jūryō and makushita divisions. He acquired Japanese citizenship in April 2017 and retired from active competition the following month. He became a coach at Takasago stable under the elder name Nishikijima Oyakata. In November 2020 he became head coach of Takasago stable.

== Early life and sumo background ==
Dashnyam was the second son of a successful Mongolian wrestler who achieved a level roughly equivalent to sumo's komusubi. From the ages of six to twelve he attended the Naadam festival, where he was also schooled in horse training. He did not continue his training, however, and in 1997 chose to accompany his friend, future yokozuna Asashōryū who was moving to Japan to attend high school. It was understood it was largely to keep his friend from becoming homesick. They were accepted by Meitoku Gijuku high school, known for its strong sumo program. They were seniors to later stars Kotoshōgiku and Tochiōzan.

== Career ==
After high school he followed his friend Asashōryū to Wakamatsu stable (now Takasago stable) and fought his first professional sumo bout in January 2000. In later years Asasekiryū would often serve as a tachimochi or sword bearer during Asashōryū's yokozuna dohyō-iri or ring entering ceremony. His shikona or fighting name literally means morning red dragon, very similar to Asashoryu's morning blue dragon (in both cases, the Asa character is taken from his stablemaster's fighting name of Asashio, who was a classmate at Kinki University of Asashōryū and Asasekiryū's high school sumo coach).

Asasekiryū won the tournament championship or yūshō in the jonidan division in May 2000 with a perfect 7-0 record. He earned promotion to the jūryō (second division) in July 2002, and to the top makuuchi division in March 2003, following his 11-4 score which won the jūryō championship.

He made little impact in the top division until March 2004, when he won his first twelve bouts, including a defeat of ōzeki Kaiō. He finished as tournament runner-up with a 13-2 record and earned two special prizes for Technique and Outstanding Performance. In May 2006 he scored ten wins at maegashira 2 and won the Fighting Spirit prize. He was promoted to komusubi for the July 2006 tournament, but was forced to withdraw partway through this tournament due to injury and had some mixed results after that.

In May 2007, fighting from the mid maegashira ranks, he produced an outstanding 12-3 record. This gave him runner-up honours once again, and his second Technique prize. In July 2007 Asasekiryū had his first chance to fight a yokozuna and earn a gold star when he met new yokozuna Hakuhō, as sumo rules prevented him from being matched against his stablemate Asashōryū. He lost, but the eight wins he managed in this tournament at maegashira 1 were enough to earn him promotion to sekiwake for September, which was to be his highest career rank. He had a winning record in that tournament, but after a disappointing 3-12 score in November 2007, he was demoted back to the maegashira ranks for the January 2008 tournament.

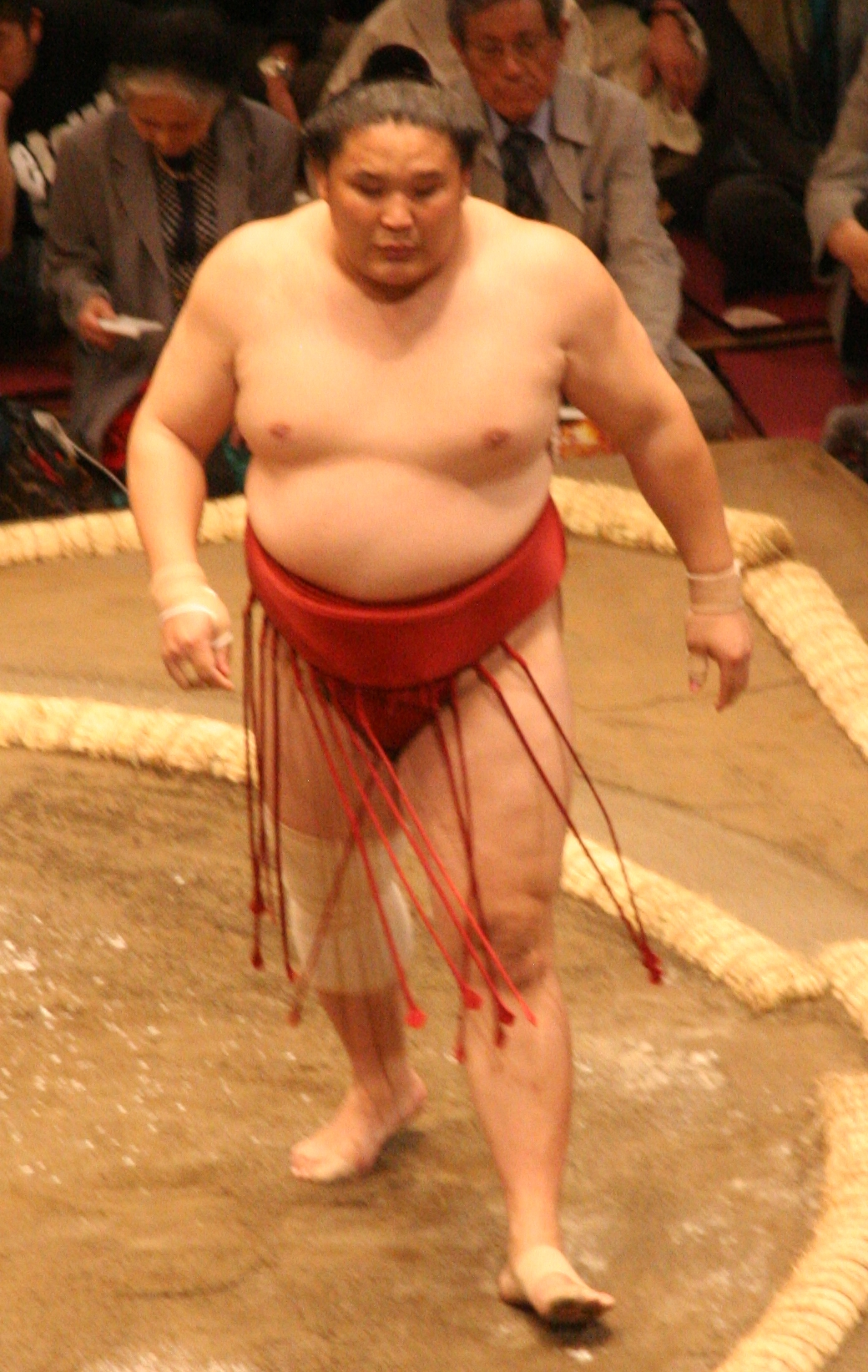
Asasekiryū in May 2009

Asasekiryū produced two good performances in the first two tournaments of 2008. In January he scored ten wins and in March he defeated two ōzeki, and tournament runner-up Baruto to finish 8-7. This performance returned him to the titled san'yaku ranks for the May 2008 tournament, at komusubi. However he was unable to maintain his ranking, only scoring six wins against nine losses. He was again ranked at komusubi in September 2008, but turned in a poor 4-11 record. He became his stable's top rikishi in February 2010, following the retirement of Asashōryū. Asasekiryū expressed his shock and sadness at the sudden retirement of a friend he had known since the age of 11. He continued to move up and down the division, reaching maegashira 1 in July 2010 but falling back to maegashira 9 by May 2011. In the May 2012 tournament, ranked at maegashira 14, he stood at only 3–7 after ten days, and although he rallied somewhat to finish on 6–9, this was not enough to prevent demotion back to jūryō for the first time. He returned to makuuchi in September after just one tournament away, but then was injured on just the second day of the November 2012 tournament and had to withdraw, resulting in another demotion to jūryō. He became somewhat of a second division regular, doing enough to maintain sekitori status while never achieving enough success for repromotion. A 10-5 record in July 2015 however, saw his promotion to makuuchi after a near three-year hiatus. He maintained his position in the top division despite a 7-8 record in September 2015 but was relegated after recording only 3 wins in November. His run of 86 consecutive tournaments ranked as a sekitori ended in November 2016 when he could score only 4-11 at jūryō 9. This result left the Takasago stable without any wrestlers in the top two divisions for the first time since it was founded in 1878, a situation for which Asasekiryū expressed his regret.

== Retirement from sumo ==
He acquired Japanese citizenship in April 2017. This allowed him to stay in the sumo world after retirement as an elder of the Japan Sumo Association. He announced he was retiring on May 12, 2017. He became Nishikijima Oyakata, an elder name which had been thought to be owned by the active wrestler Toyonoshima, but Asasekiryū is listed in an owner's position rather than a borrower's at the Sumo Association. In his retirement press conference he said his most memorable honbasho was his 13–2 runner-up performance in March 2004, the same tournament in which his stablemate Asashōryū won with a perfect 15–0 record. His danpatsu-shiki (retirement ceremony) was held at the Ryōgoku Kokugikan on February 4, 2018, with around 250 guests taking part in the hair-cutting ritual. His four-year-old son was scheduled to appear with him but began crying and was excused.

In November 2020 he took over as head coach of Takasago stable and the Takasago ichimon. He is the first foreign born coach to head an ichimon.

Asasekiryū was handed a 20% salary cut for three months in June 2021 after then-ōzeki Asanoyama was issued a one-year suspension from sumo for violating COVID-19 protocols.

== Family ==
Asasekiryū has known his wife, a Mongolian national, since 2006 when he visited Mongolia after reaching a san'yaku rank. They began a relationship in 2012 and had a child together in 2013, but they delayed their wedding reception as Asasekiryū wanted to wait until he was promoted back to the top makuuchi division, which did not happen until September 2015. Although he soon fell to jūryō again, the reception went ahead on February 14, 2016. They have a son and a daughter.

Asasekiryū graduated from the National University of Mongolia in June 2010 after studying by correspondence for six years. His thesis was in the history and culture of sumo in Japan.

== Fighting style ==
Asasekiryū was a yotsu-sumo (grappling) wrestler, preferring a migi-yotsu (left hand outside, right hand inside) grip on his opponent's mawashi or belt. His most common winning technique was a straightforward yorikiri or force out. He was also fond of throws, most often employing uwatenage (outer arm throw) and uwatedashinage (pulling outer arm throw).

== Career record ==
Asasekiryū Tarō
Year	January Hatsu basho, Tokyo	March Haru basho, Osaka	May Natsu basho, Tokyo	July Nagoya basho, Nagoya	September Aki basho, Tokyo	November Kyūshū basho, Fukuoka
2000	(Maezumo)	West Jonokuchi #34; 6–1	East Jonidan #80; 7–0–P; Champion	East Sandanme #72; 5–2	East Sandanme #45; 6–1	East Makushita #56; 4–3
2001	West Makushita #47; 5–2	West Makushita #32; 3–4	East Makushita #41; 5–2	East Makushita #27; 6–1	East Makushita #10; 4–3	East Makushita #7; 3–4
2002	East Makushita #12; 5–2	East Makushita #6; 5–2	West Makushita #1; 5–2	West Jūryō #11; 6–9	East Jūryō #13; 10–5	East Jūryō #8; 10–5
2003	West Jūryō #1; 11–4–P; Champion	East Maegashira #10; 6–9	West Maegashira #13; 8–7	West Maegashira #9; 10–5	East Maegashira #4; 7–8	West Maegashira #4; 3–12
2004	East Maegashira #12; 7–8	West Maegashira #12; 13–2; OT	East Maegashira #2; 3–12	West Maegashira #10; 11–4	East Maegashira #4; 4–11	East Maegashira #10; 7–8
2005	East Maegashira #11; 8–7	West Maegashira #9; 8–7	West Maegashira #8; 8–7	West Maegashira #7; 6–7–2	East Maegashira #10; 6–2–7	West Maegashira #12; 9–6
2006	West Maegashira #4; 5–10	West Maegashira #8; 10–5	East Maegashira #2; 10–5; F	East Komusubi #1; 1–2–12	West Maegashira #9; 7–8	West Maegashira #9; 10–5
2007	East Maegashira #6; 10–5	West Maegashira #2; 4–11	West Maegashira #8; 12–3; T	West Maegashira #1; 8–7	West Sekiwake #1; 8–7	West Sekiwake #1; 3–12
2008	West Maegashira #4; 10–5	East Maegashira #1; 8–7	West Komusubi #1; 6–9	East Maegashira #2; 8–7	West Komusubi #1; 4–11	East Maegashira #5; 5–10
2009	East Maegashira #8; 6–9	East Maegashira #11; 9–6	East Maegashira #7; 5–10	East Maegashira #12; 9–6	East Maegashira #6; 6–9	East Maegashira #10; 8–7
2010	West Maegashira #8; 6–9	East Maegashira #11; 10–5	West Maegashira #4; 9–6	West Maegashira #1; 4–11	West Maegashira #6; 9–6	West Maegashira #2; 6–9
2011	West Maegashira #5; 6–9	Tournament Cancelled; 0–0–0	West Maegashira #9; 7–8	West Maegashira #9; 6–9	West Maegashira #12; 7–8	West Maegashira #13; 6–9
2012	East Maegashira #15; 9–6	East Maegashira #11; 5–10	East Maegashira #14; 6–9	East Jūryō #1; 9–6	East Maegashira #13; 8–7	West Maegashira #9; 0–3–12
2013	West Jūryō #6; 5–7–3	West Jūryō #11; 10–5	East Jūryō #4; 5–10	East Jūryō #8; 9–6	West Jūryō #5; 8–7	East Jūryō #4; 6–9
2014	East Jūryō #7; 9–6	West Jūryō #3; 7–8	East Jūryō #4; 6–9	West Jūryō #6; 7–8	East Jūryō #7; 7–8	West Jūryō #7; 9–6
2015	East Jūryō #2; 5–10	West Jūryō #5; 8–7	East Jūryō #3; 7–8	East Jūryō #4; 10–5	East Maegashira #15; 7–8	East Maegashira #16; 3–12
2016	East Jūryō #8; 9–6	East Jūryō #2; 4–11	West Jūryō #8; 7–8	West Jūryō #10; 8–7	West Jūryō #7; 7–8	West Jūryō #9; 4–11
2017	West Makushita #1; 2–5	West Makushita #9; 3–4	West Makushita #14; Retired –	x	x	x
Record given as wins–losses–absences Top division champion Top division runner-up Retired Lower divisions Non-participation Sanshō key: F=Fighting spirit; O=Outstanding performance; T=Technique Also shown: ★=Kinboshi; P=Playoff(s); Divisions: Makuuchi — Jūryō — Makushita — Sandanme — Jonidan — Jonokuchi Makuuchi ranks: Yokozuna — Ōzeki — Sekiwake — Komusubi — Maegashira

== See also ==
- Glossary of sumo terms
- List of sumo elders
- List of past sumo wrestlers
- List of Mongolian sumo wrestlers
- List of non-Japanese sumo wrestlers
- List of sumo top division runners-up
- List of sumo second division champions
- List of sekiwake
