= 2004 in sumo =

The following are the events in professional sumo during 2004.

== Tournaments ==
=== Hatsu basho ===
Ryogoku Kokugikan, Tokyo, 11 January – 25 January

2004 Hatsu basho results - Makuuchi Division
| W | | L | | A | East | | | Rank | West | | | W | | L | | A |
|---|---|---|---|---|---|---|---|---|---|---|---|---|---|---|---|---|
| 15 | - | 0 | - | 0 | | (Mongolia) | **Asashōryū** | Y | ø | | | | | | | |
| 9 | - | 6 | - | 0 | | (Japan) | **Tochiazuma** | O | | (Japan) | **Chiyotaikai** | 10 | - | 5 | - | 0 |
| 10 | - | 5 | - | 0 | | (Japan) | **Kaiō** | O | ø | (Japan) | Musōyama | 5 | - | 4 | - | 6 |
| 4 | - | 11 | - | 0 | | (Japan) | Tosanoumi | S | | (Japan) | Tamanoshima | 5 | - | 10 | - | 0 |
| 6 | - | 9 | - | 0 | | (Japan) | Tochinonada | K | | (Japan) | **Wakanosato** | 9 | - | 6 | - | 0 |
| 1 | - | 11 | - | 3 | ø | (Japan) | Tōki | M1 | | (Japan) | Hokutōriki | 5 | - | 10 | - | 0 |
| 6 | - | 9 | - | 0 | | (Japan) | Iwakiyama | M2 | | (Mongolia) | **Kyokushūzan** | 8 | - | 7 | - | 0 |
| 4 | - | 11 | - | 0 | | (Japan) | Takamisakari | M3 | | (Mongolia) | **Kyokutenhō** | 8 | - | 7 | - | 0 |
| 7 | - | 8 | - | 0 | | (Japan) | Tokitsuumi | M4 | | (Japan) | **Kotomitsuki** | 13 | - | 2 | - | 0 |
| 11 | - | 4 | - | 0 | | (Japan) | **Kakizoe** | M5 | ø | (Japan) | Kasuganishiki | 4 | - | 10 | - | 1 |
| 10 | - | 5 | - | 0 | | (Japan) | **Dejima** | M6 | | (Japan) | Takekaze | 4 | - | 11 | - | 0 |
| 11 | - | 4 | - | 0 | | (Japan) | **Shimotori** | M7 | | (Japan) | **Miyabiyama** | 11 | - | 4 | - | 0 |
| 9 | - | 6 | - | 0 | | (Japan) | **Aminishiki** | M8 | | (Japan) | **Jūmonji** | 8 | - | 7 | - | 0 |
| 7 | - | 8 | - | 0 | | (Japan) | Kotoryū | M9 | | (Japan) | Kinkaiyama | 8 | - | 7 | - | 0 |
| 8 | - | 7 | - | 0 | | (Japan) | **Takanonami** | M10 | | (Georgia (country)) | **Kokkai** | 8 | - | 7 | - | 0 |
| 5 | - | 10 | - | 0 | | (Japan) | Yōtsukasa | M11 | | (Japan) | **Tochisakae** | 9 | - | 6 | - | 0 |
| 7 | - | 8 | - | 0 | | (Mongolia) | Asasekiryū | M12 | | (Japan) | Wakatoba | 4 | - | 11 | - | 0 |
| 0 | - | 0 | - | 15 | ø | (Japan) | Kotonowaka | M13 | | (Japan) | Takanowaka | 4 | - | 11 | - | 0 |
| 7 | - | 8 | - | 0 | | (Japan) | Ushiomaru | M14 | | (Japan) | **Buyūzan** | 10 | - | 5 | - | 0 |
| 3 | - | 12 | - | 0 | | (Japan) | Kitazakura | M15 | | (Japan) | Kaihō | 7 | - | 8 | - | 0 |
| 10 | - | 5 | - | 0 | | (Japan) | **Asanowaka** | M16 | | (Japan) | Tamakasuga | 7 | - | 8 | - | 0 |
| 7 | - | 8 | - | 0 | | (Japan) | Hayateumi | M17 | ø | | | | | | | |

ø - Indicates a pull-out or absent rank
**winning record in bold**
**Yusho Winner**

=== Haru basho ===
Osaka Prefectural Gymnasium, Osaka, 14 March – 28 March

2004 Haru basho results - Makuuchi Division
| W | | L | | A | East | | | Rank | West | | | W | | L | | A |
|---|---|---|---|---|---|---|---|---|---|---|---|---|---|---|---|---|
| 15 | - | 0 | - | 0 | | (Mongolia) | **Asashōryū** | Y | ø | | | | | | | |
| 13 | - | 2 | - | 0 | | (Japan) | **Chiyotaikai** | O | | (Japan) | **Kaiō** | 13 | - | 2 | - | 0 |
| 0 | - | 3 | - | 12 | ø | (Japan) | Tochiazuma | O | | (Japan) | **Musōyama** | 9 | - | 6 | - | 0 |
| 8 | - | 7 | - | 0 | | (Japan) | **Wakanosato** | S | | (Japan) | Kotomitsuki | 7 | - | 8 | - | 0 |
| 6 | - | 9 | - | 0 | | (Japan) | Kakizoe | K | | (Japan) | Shimotori | 6 | - | 9 | - | 0 |
| 8 | - | 7 | - | 0 | | (Japan) | **Miyabiyama** | M1 | | (Mongolia) | Kyokushūzan | 4 | - | 11 | - | 0 |
| 7 | - | 8 | - | 0 | | (Japan) | Dejima | M2 | | (Mongolia) | **Kyokutenhō** | 10 | - | 5 | - | 0 |
| 8 | - | 7 | - | 0 | | (Japan) | **Tochinonada** | M3 | | (Japan) | Tamanoshima | 6 | - | 9 | - | 0 |
| 3 | - | 12 | - | 0 | | (Japan) | Aminishiki | M4 | | (Japan) | Tosanoumi | 5 | - | 10 | - | 0 |
| 8 | - | 7 | - | 0 | | (Japan) | **Tokitsuumi** | M5 | | (Japan) | Iwakiyama | 7 | - | 8 | - | 0 |
| 9 | - | 6 | - | 0 | | (Japan) | **Hokutōriki** | M6 | | (Japan) | Jūmonji | 4 | - | 11 | - | 0 |
| 7 | - | 8 | - | 0 | | (Japan) | Tochisakae | M7 | | (Japan) | Kinkaiyama | 4 | - | 11 | - | 0 |
| 8 | - | 7 | - | 0 | | (Japan) | **Takamisakari** | M8 | | (Japan) | Takanonami | 5 | - | 10 | - | 0 |
| 8 | - | 7 | - | 0 | | (Japan) | **Buyūzan** | M9 | | (Georgia (country)) | **Kokkai** | 8 | - | 7 | - | 0 |
| 5 | - | 10 | - | 0 | | (Japan) | Kasuganishiki | M10 | | (Japan) | **Kotoryū** | 8 | - | 7 | - | 0 |
| 5 | - | 10 | - | 0 | | (Japan) | Asanowaka | M11 | | (Japan) | **Takekaze** | 9 | - | 6 | - | 0 |
| 8 | - | 7 | - | 0 | | (Japan) | **Tōki** | M12 | | (Mongolia) | **Asasekiryū** | 13 | - | 2 | - | 0 |
| 11 | - | 4 | - | 0 | | (Japan) | **Kotonowaka** | M13 | | (Japan) | Chiyotenzan | 3 | - | 12 | - | 0 |
| 9 | - | 6 | - | 0 | | (Japan) | **Harunoyama** | M14 | | (Japan) | Ushiomaru | 7 | - | 8 | - | 0 |
| 7 | - | 8 | - | 0 | | (Japan) | Futen'ō | M15 | | (Japan) | Toyozakura | 8 | - | 7 | - | 0 |
| 2 | - | 13 | - | 0 | | (Japan) | Wakanoyama | M16 | | (Japan) | **Kaihō** | 9 | - | 6 | - | 0 |
| 6 | - | 9 | - | 0 | | (Japan) | Yōtsukasa | M17 | ø | | | | | | | |

ø - Indicates a pull-out or absent rank
**winning record in bold**
**Yusho Winner**

=== Natsu basho ===
Ryogoku Kokugikan, Tokyo, 9 May – 23 May

2004 Natsu basho results - Makuuchi Division
| W | | L | | A | East | | | Rank | West | | | W | | L | | A |
|---|---|---|---|---|---|---|---|---|---|---|---|---|---|---|---|---|
| 13 | - | 2 | - | 0 | | (Mongolia) | **Asashōryū*** | Y | ø | | | | | | | |
| 9 | - | 6 | - | 0 | | (Japan) | **Chiyotaikai** | O | | (Japan) | **Kaiō** | 10 | - | 5 | - | 0 |
| 6 | - | 9 | - | 0 | | (Japan) | Musōyama | O | ø | (Japan) | Tochiazuma | 0 | - | 0 | - | 15 |
| 9 | - | 6 | - | 0 | | (Japan) | **Wakanosato** | S | | (Mongolia) | Kyokutenhō | 6 | - | 9 | - | 0 |
| 3 | - | 12 | - | 0 | | (Japan) | Miyabiyama | K | | (Japan) | **Kotomitsuki** | 9 | - | 6 | - | 0 |
| 5 | - | 10 | - | 0 | | (Japan) | Tochinonada | M1 | | (Japan) | **Hokutōriki** | 13 | - | 2 | - | 0 |
| 3 | - | 12 | - | 0 | | (Mongolia) | Asasekiryū | M2 | | (Japan) | Kakizoe | 6 | - | 9 | - | 0 |
| 7 | - | 8 | - | 0 | | (Japan) | Shimotori | M3 | | (Japan) | Dejima | 7 | - | 8 | - | 0 |
| 7 | - | 8 | - | 0 | | (Japan) | Tokitsuumi | M4 | | (Japan) | Takamisakari | 6 | - | 9 | - | 0 |
| 8 | - | 7 | - | 0 | | (Japan) | **Kotonowaka** | M5 | | (Japan) | **Tamanoshima** | 12 | - | 3 | - | 0 |
| 4 | - | 11 | - | 0 | | (Japan) | Buyūzan | M6 | | (Japan) | **Iwakiyama** | 10 | - | 5 | - | 0 |
| 10 | - | 5 | - | 0 | | (Georgia (country)) | **Kokkai** | M7 | | (Mongolia) | **Kyokushūzan** | 9 | - | 6 | - | 0 |
| 9 | - | 6 | - | 0 | | (Japan) | **Takekaze** | M8 | | (Japan) | Tochisakae | 7 | - | 8 | - | 0 |
| 10 | - | 5 | - | 0 | | (Japan) | **Kotoryū** | M9 | | (Japan) | Tosanoumi | 7 | - | 8 | - | 0 |
| 4 | - | 11 | - | 0 | | (Japan) | Harunoyama | M10 | | (Japan) | Tōki | 4 | - | 11 | - | 0 |
| 8 | - | 7 | - | 0 | | (Japan) | **Aminishiki** | M11 | | (Japan) | **Hayateumi** | 8 | - | 7 | - | 0 |
| 9 | - | 6 | - | 0 | | (Japan) | **Kaihō** | M12 | | (Japan) | **Jūmonji** | 8 | - | 7 | - | 0 |
| 0 | - | 3 | - | 0 | ø | (Japan) | Takanonami | M13 | | (Japan) | **Kinkaiyama** | 8 | - | 7 | - | 0 |
| 0 | - | 0 | - | 15 | ø | (Japan) | Kasuganishiki | M14 | | (Japan) | Asanowaka | 4 | - | 11 | - | 0 |
| 0 | - | 0 | - | 15 | ø | (Japan) | Ushiomaru | M15 | | (Japan) | Futen'ō | 7 | - | 8 | - | 0 |
| 12 | - | 3 | - | 0 | | (Mongolia) | **Hakuhō** | M16 | | (Japan) | **Takanowaka** | 8 | - | 7 | - | 0 |
| 5 | - | 10 | - | 0 | | (Japan) | Kōbō | M17 | ø | | | | | | | |

ø - Indicates a pull-out or absent rank
**winning record in bold**
**Yusho Winner**
***Won Playoff**

=== Nagoya basho ===
Aichi Prefectural Gymnasium, Nagoya, 4 July – 18 July

2004 Nagoya basho results - Makuuchi Division
| W | | L | | A | East | | | Rank | West | | | W | | L | | A |
|---|---|---|---|---|---|---|---|---|---|---|---|---|---|---|---|---|
| 13 | - | 2 | - | 0 | | (Mongolia) | **Asashōryū** | Y | ø | | | | | | | |
| 11 | - | 4 | - | 0 | | (Japan) | **Kaiō** | O | | (Japan) | **Chiyotaikai** | 10 | - | 5 | - | 0 |
| 8 | - | 7 | - | 0 | | (Japan) | **Musōyama** | O | ø | | | | | | | |
| 8 | - | 7 | - | 0 | | (Japan) | **Wakanosato** | S | | (Japan) | Hokutōriki | 3 | - | 12 | - | 0 |
| | | | | | ø | | | S | | (Japan) | **Tochiazuma** | 10 | - | 5 | - | 0 |
| 7 | - | 8 | - | 0 | | (Japan) | Kotomitsuki | K | | (Japan) | Tamanoshima | 6 | - | 9 | - | 0 |
| 8 | - | 7 | - | 0 | | (Mongolia) | **Kyokutenhō** | M1 | | (Japan) | Iwakiyama | 7 | - | 8 | - | 0 |
| 8 | - | 7 | - | 0 | | (Georgia (country)) | **Kokkai** | M2 | | (Japan) | Kotonowaka | 3 | - | 12 | - | 0 |
| 4 | - | 11 | - | 0 | | (Japan) | Kotoryū | M3 | | (Mongolia) | Kyokushūzan | 3 | - | 12 | - | 0 |
| 9 | - | 6 | - | 0 | | (Japan) | **Shimotori** | M4 | | (Japan) | Dejima | 7 | - | 8 | - | 0 |
| 6 | - | 9 | - | 0 | | (Japan) | Takekaze | M5 | | (Japan) | Kakizoe | 7 | - | 8 | - | 0 |
| 6 | - | 9 | - | 0 | | (Japan) | Tokitsuumi | M6 | | (Japan) | **Tochinonada** | 9 | - | 6 | - | 0 |
| 12 | - | 3 | - | 0 | | (Japan) | **Miyabiyama** | M7 | | (Japan) | **Takamisakari** | 8 | - | 7 | - | 0 |
| 11 | - | 4 | - | 0 | | (Mongolia) | **Hakuhō** | M8 | | (Japan) | Kaihō | 7 | - | 8 | - | 0 |
| 4 | - | 11 | - | 0 | | (Japan) | Aminishiki | M9 | | (Japan) | Tochisakae | 6 | - | 9 | - | 0 |
| 7 | - | 8 | - | 0 | | (Japan) | Hayateumi | M10 | | (Mongolia) | **Asasekiryū** | 11 | - | 4 | - | 0 |
| 11 | - | 4 | - | 0 | | (Japan) | **Tosanoumi** | M11 | | (Japan) | **Jūmonji** | 8 | - | 7 | - | 0 |
| 8 | - | 7 | - | 0 | | (Japan) | **Buyūzan** | M12 | | (Japan) | Kinkaiyama | 4 | - | 11 | - | 0 |
| 4 | - | 8 | - | 3 | ø | (South Korea) | Kasugaō | M13 | | (Japan) | **Takanowaka** | 8 | - | 7 | - | 0 |
| 12 | - | 3 | - | 0 | | (Japan) | **Toyozakura** | M14 | | (Japan) | **Ōtsukasa** | 8 | - | 7 | - | 0 |
| 3 | - | 12 | - | 0 | | (Japan) | Wakatoba | M15 | | (Japan) | **Futen'ō** | 10 | - | 5 | - | 0 |
| 3 | - | 12 | - | 0 | | (Japan) | Harunoyama | M16 | | (Japan) | Tōki | 6 | - | 9 | - | 0 |
| 6 | - | 9 | - | 0 | | (Mongolia) | Tokitenkū | M17 | ø | | | | | | | |

ø - Indicates a pull-out or absent rank
**winning record in bold**
**Yusho Winner**

=== Aki basho ===
Ryogoku Kokugikan, Tokyo, 12 September – 26 September

2004 Aki basho results - Makuuchi Division
| W | | L | | A | East | | | Rank | West | | | W | | L | | A |
|---|---|---|---|---|---|---|---|---|---|---|---|---|---|---|---|---|
| 9 | - | 6 | - | 0 | | (Mongolia) | **Asashōryū** | Y | ø | | | | | | | |
| 13 | - | 2 | - | 0 | | (Japan) | **Kaiō** | O | | (Japan) | **Chiyotaikai** | 8 | - | 7 | - | 0 |
| 2 | - | 7 | - | 6 | ø | (Japan) | Musōyama | O | ø | (Japan) | Tochiazuma | 2 | - | 2 | - | 11 |
| 10 | - | 5 | - | 0 | | (Japan) | **Wakanosato** | S | | (Japan) | **Miyabiyama** | 9 | - | 6 | - | 0 |
| 5 | - | 10 | - | 0 | | (Mongolia) | Kyokutenhō | K | | (Japan) | **Kotomitsuki** | 8 | - | 7 | - | 0 |
| 5 | - | 10 | - | 0 | | (Japan) | Shimotori | M1 | | (Georgia (country)) | Kokkai | 7 | - | 8 | - | 0 |
| 7 | - | 8 | - | 0 | | (Japan) | Iwakiyama | M2 | | (Japan) | Tamanoshima | 7 | - | 8 | - | 0 |
| 8 | - | 7 | - | 0 | | (Mongolia) | **Hakuhō** | M3 | | (Japan) | **Tochinonada** | 11 | - | 4 | - | 0 |
| 4 | - | 11 | - | 0 | | (Mongolia) | Asasekiryū | M4 | | (Japan) | Tosanoumi | 7 | - | 8 | - | 0 |
| 5 | - | 10 | - | 0 | | (Japan) | Toyozakura | M5 | | (Japan) | **Dejima** | 10 | - | 5 | - | 0 |
| 5 | - | 10 | - | 0 | | (Japan) | Hokutōriki | M6 | | (Japan) | **Kakizoe** | 10 | - | 5 | - | 0 |
| 7 | - | 8 | - | 0 | | (Japan) | Takamisakari | M7 | | (Japan) | **Takekaze** | 8 | - | 7 | - | 0 |
| 7 | - | 8 | - | 0 | | (Japan) | Kotoryū | M8 | | (Japan) | Tokitsuumi | 5 | - | 10 | - | 0 |
| 10 | - | 5 | - | 0 | | (Japan) | **Kotonowaka** | M9 | | (Japan) | Kaihō | 6 | - | 9 | - | 0 |
| 4 | - | 11 | - | 0 | | (Japan) | Futen'ō | M10 | | (Mongolia) | **Kyokushūzan** | 11 | - | 4 | - | 0 |
| 9 | - | 6 | - | 0 | | (Japan) | **Jūmonji** | M11 | | (Japan) | **Buyūzan** | 8 | - | 7 | - | 0 |
| 8 | - | 7 | - | 0 | | (Japan) | **Hayateumi** | M12 | | (Japan) | **Takanowaka** | 8 | - | 7 | - | 0 |
| 5 | - | 10 | - | 0 | | (Japan) | Tochisakae | M13 | | (Japan) | Ōtsukasa | 3 | - | 12 | - | 0 |
| 9 | - | 6 | - | 0 | | (Bulgaria) | **Kotoōshū** | M14 | | (Japan) | Tamakasuga | 8 | - | 7 | - | 0 |
| 10 | - | 5 | - | 0 | | (Russia) | **Rohō** | M15 | | (Japan) | Toyonoshima | 6 | - | 9 | - | 0 |
| 6 | - | 9 | - | 0 | | (Japan) | Aminishiki | M16 | | (Japan) | **Takanotsuru** | 9 | - | 6 | - | 0 |
| 6 | - | 9 | - | 0 | | (Japan) | Kitazakura | M17 | ø | | | | | | | |

ø - Indicates a pull-out or absent rank
**winning record in bold**
**Yusho Winner**

=== Kyushu basho ===
Fukuoka International Centre, Kyushu, 14 November – 28 November

2004 Kyushu basho results - Makuuchi Division
| W | | L | | A | East | | | Rank | West | | | W | | L | | A |
|---|---|---|---|---|---|---|---|---|---|---|---|---|---|---|---|---|
| 13 | - | 2 | - | 0 | | (Mongolia) | **Asashōryū** | Y | ø | | | | | | | |
| 12 | - | 3 | - | 0 | | (Japan) | **Kaiō** | O | | (Japan) | **Chiyotaikai** | 7 | - | 8 | - | 0 |
| 0 | - | 4 | - | 0 | ø | (Japan) | Musōyama | O | ø | (Japan) | Tochiazuma | 3 | - | 3 | - | 9 |
| 11 | - | 4 | - | 0 | | (Japan) | **Wakanosato** | S | | (Japan) | **Miyabiyama** | 9 | - | 6 | - | 0 |
| 10 | - | 5 | - | 0 | | (Japan) | **Kotomitsuki** | K | | (Japan) | Tochinonada | 6 | - | 9 | - | 0 |
| 0 | - | 3 | - | 12 | ø | (Japan) | Dejima | M1 | | (Mongolia) | **Hakuhō** | 12 | - | 3 | - | 0 |
| 6 | - | 9 | - | 0 | | (Japan) | Kakizoe | M2 | | (Georgia (country)) | Kokkai | 7 | - | 8 | - | 0 |
| 9 | - | 6 | - | 0 | | (Japan) | **Iwakiyama** | M3 | | (Mongolia) | Kyokutenhō | 5 | - | 10 | - | 0 |
| 8 | - | 7 | - | 0 | | (Japan) | **Tamanoshima** | M4 | | (Mongolia) | Kyokushūzan | 2 | - | 13 | - | 0 |
| 4 | - | 11 | - | 0 | | (Japan) | Shimotori | M5 | | (Japan) | **Kotonowaka** | 9 | - | 6 | - | 0 |
| 9 | - | 6 | - | 0 | | (Japan) | **Tosanoumi** | M6 | | (Japan) | Takekaze | 6 | - | 9 | - | 0 |
| 5 | - | 10 | - | 0 | | (Japan) | Jūmonji | M7 | | (Japan) | **Takamisakari** | 8 | - | 7 | - | 0 |
| 3 | - | 12 | - | 0 | | (Japan) | Toyozakura | M8 | | (Japan) | Buyūzan | 5 | - | 10 | - | 0 |
| 8 | - | 7 | - | 0 | | (Japan) | **Kotoryū** | M9 | | (Russia) | **Rohō** | 10 | - | 5 | - | 0 |
| 7 | - | 8 | - | 0 | | (Mongolia) | Asasekiryū | M10 | | (Bulgaria) | **Kotoōshū** | 11 | - | 4 | - | 0 |
| 9 | - | 6 | - | 0 | | (Japan) | **Hayateumi** | M11 | | (Japan) | **Hokutōriki** | 8 | - | 7 | - | 0 |
| 8 | - | 7 | - | 0 | | (Japan) | **Takanowaka** | M12 | | (Japan) | Takanotsuru | 4 | - | 11 | - | 0 |
| 10 | - | 5 | - | 0 | | (Japan) | **Kaihō** | M13 | | (Japan) | Tamakasuga | 7 | - | 8 | - | 0 |
| 8 | - | 7 | - | 0 | | (Japan) | **Tokitsuumi** | M14 | | (Mongolia) | **Ama** | 8 | - | 7 | - | 0 |
| 8 | - | 7 | - | 0 | | (South Korea) | **Kasugaō** | M15 | | (Mongolia) | Tokitenkū | 7 | - | 8 | - | 0 |
| 7 | - | 8 | - | 0 | | (Japan) | Futen'ō | M16 | | (Japan) | **Kisenosato** | 9 | - | 6 | - | 0 |
| 2 | - | 13 | - | 0 | | (Japan) | Tōki | M17 | ø | | | | | | | |

ø - Indicates a pull-out or absent rank
**winning record in bold**
**Yusho Winner**

== News ==
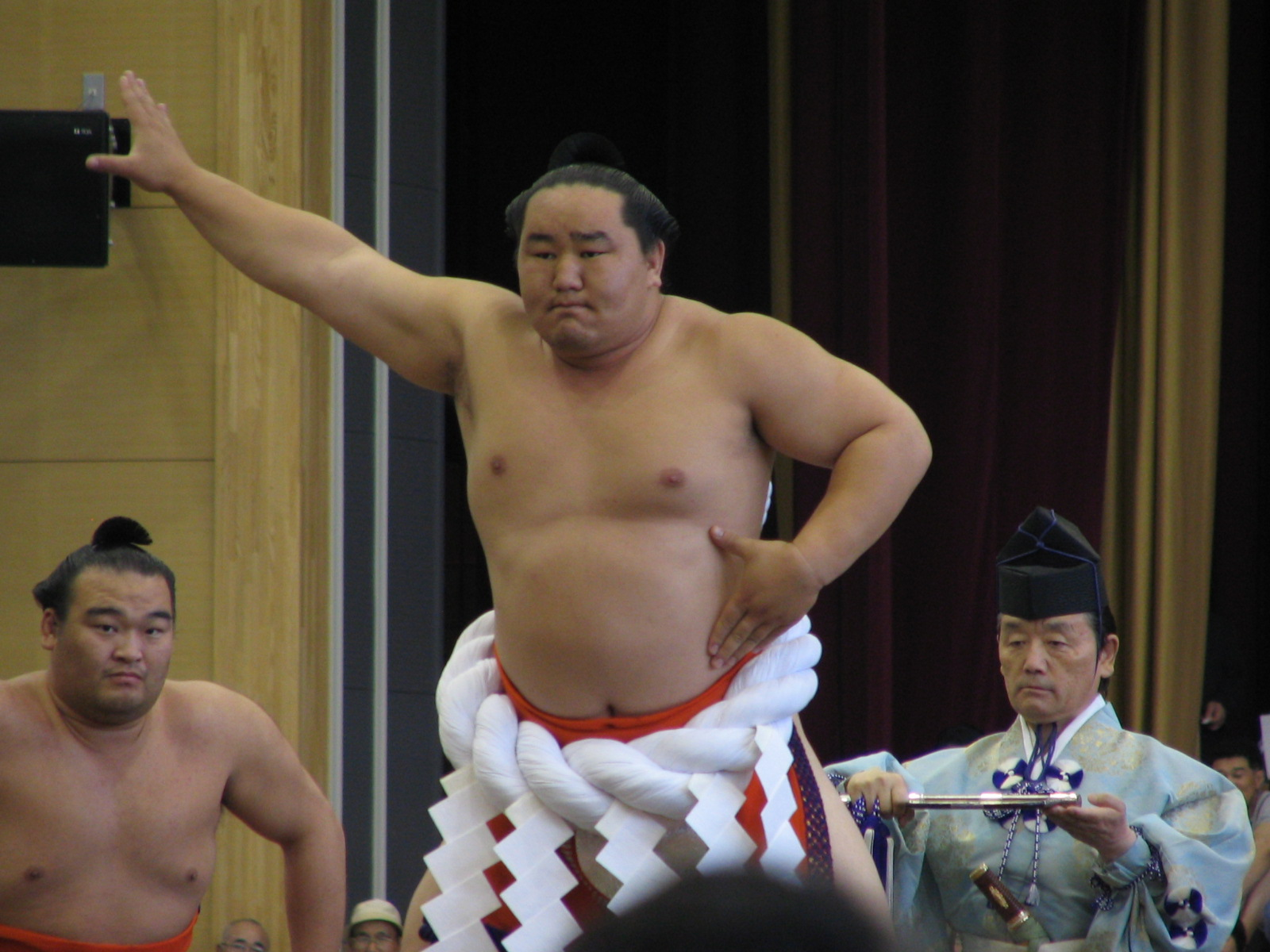
Asashoryu performs the dohyo-iri during a regional tour in 2004.

=== January ===
- The number of spots in the top division increases for the first time since January 1991, from 40 to 42. The second highest juryo division increases from 26 to 28.
- At the Hatsu basho in Tokyo, achieving his first ever undefeated yusho, Yokozuna Asashoryu wins his 5th championship. Runner-up is former sekiwake Kotomitsuki, who has fallen temporarily to a maegashira rank but produces a fine 13–2 score and wins the Fighting Spirit Prize. Kakizoe wins 11 and is rewarded with the Technique Prize and promotion to the sanyaku ranks for the first time. Ozeki Tochiazuma, who was aiming at a yokozuna promotion after winning the previous tournament, can only produce a 9–6 score. Former komusubi Wakanoyama wins the juryo division championship. The makushita championship is won by the 17-year-old Hagiwara (now Kisenosato) with a perfect 7–0 record. Announcing their retirements are former komusubi Oginishiki and two former juryo veterans; the 38-year-old Argentine Hoshitango and the 39-year-old Mutsuhokkai, whose career spanned 23 years.
- The retirement ceremonies of former sekiwake Akinoshima and former komusubi Daizen take place at the Kokougikan.

=== February ===
- Former ozeki Takanohana Kenshi, head of the Futagoyama stable, previously known as Fujishima stable, steps down due to ill health and passes control over to his son Takanohana Koji, who renames the stable Takanohana stable.
- Former sekiwake Terao branches out from Izutsu stable and opens his own Shikoroyama stable.
- The Sumo Association hold exhibition tournaments in South Korea, visiting Seoul on the 14th and 15th, and Pusan on the 18th. Former top division wrestler Kasugao is from South Korea and is enthusiastically cheered on by the crowds. Asashoryu wins the exhibitions.

=== March ===
- At the Haru basho in Osaka, Asashoryu chalks up a second 15–0 championship in a row to take his 6th overall. His winning streak now stands at 30 matches. The ozeki Kaio and Chiyotaikai both have excellent tournaments and finish runners-up on 13–2. Tochiazuma, by contrast, drops out after only two days. The fourth ozeki Musoyama, who was in danger of demotion, retains his rank with a 9–6 score. Maegashira 12 Asasekiryu is the third runner-up on 13–2 and wins two special prizes for Outstanding Performance and Technique. Former sekiwake Kotonowaka, at the age of nearly 36, wins 11 matches and his fourth Fighting Spirit Prize. Mongolian Hakuho wins the juryo championship after a playoff with Hayateumi and earns promotion to the top makuuchi division. Bulgarian Kotoōshū wins the makushita championship with a 7–0 score and is promoted to juryo along with Hagiwara and Toyonoshima.
- The Takekuma stable, run by the former sekiwake Kurohimeyama, shuts down. This is because his only wrestler (his son Hagurokuni) is retiring. Takekuma is moving to Tomozuna stable and says he may re-open his stable at some point in the future.

=== May ===
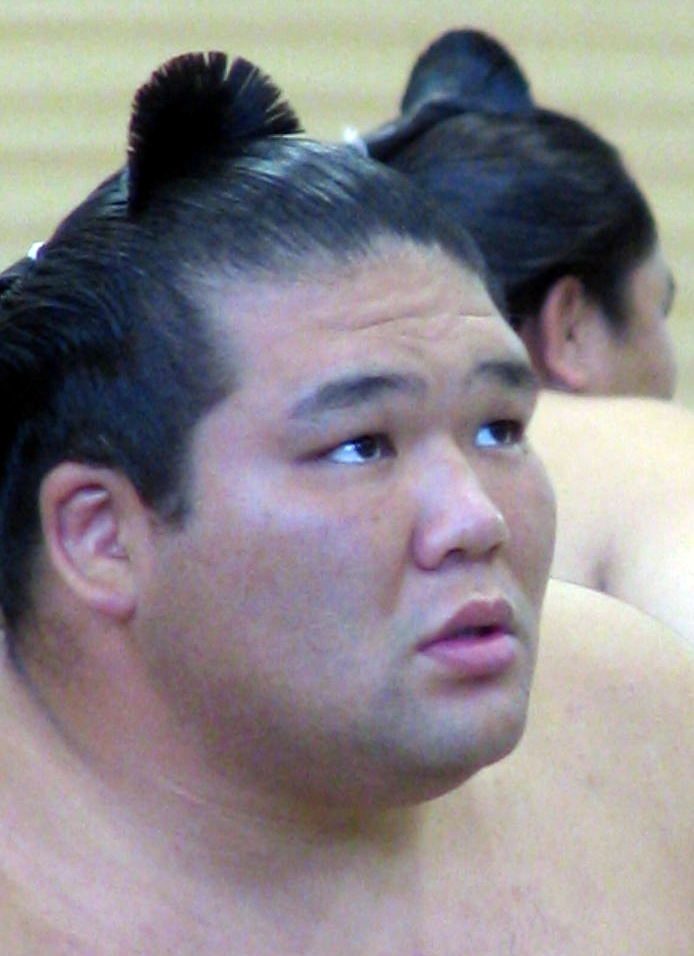
Tochiazuma in 2004, a year in which was twice demoted from the ozeki rank after injury problems.

- At the Natsu basho in Tokyo, Asashoryu's winning streak is sensationally halted at 35 by maegashira Hokutoriki, who has never defeated a yokozuna before. Hokutoriki remains in contention for the title right up until the end of the tournament. Coming into Day 15 on 13–1, one win ahead of Asashoryu, he is defeated by Hakuho (who scores 12–3 and wins the Fighting Spirit Prize in his debut top division tournament) and subsequently loses a playoff to Asashoryu, who wins his 3rd championship in a row, and his 7th overall. Hokutoriki is rewarded with the Outstanding Performance and Technique Prizes. Tochiazuma is still unable to compete and loses his ozeki status. Veteran former ozeki Takanonami, who has been fighting in the maegashira ranks for most of the last four years, announces his retirement, leaving the newly renamed Takanohana stable without any sekitori ranked wrestlers. Former komusubi Hamanoshima, in the makushita division for the last two years, and former maegashira Wakanojo, who has fallen all the way to the jonidan division, also retire. Mongolian Tokitenku wins the juryo division championship. Two Estonian wrestlers, Baruto and Kitaoji, make their professional debuts. (Kitaoji quits after only three tournaments.)

=== July ===
- At the Nagoya basho, Asashoryu takes his 4th yusho in a row with a 13–2 record. His wins include an extraordinary victory over Kotonowaka on Day 8, in a rematch after he was on the brink of defeat in the first bout. Runners-up are maegashira Miyabiyama and Toyozakura, who each score 12–3. Toyozakura wins the Fighting Spirit Award (no other prizes are given out this time). Kaio scores 11–4. Tochiazuma regains his ozeki rank by winning ten bouts, the fourth man to achieve this after Mienoumi, Takanonami and Musoyama. Hokutoriki, who was promoted to sekiwake after his fine performance in May, manages to win only three matches. Kotooshu wins the juryo championship with a 13–2 score and earns promotion to the top division.

=== August ===
- Former juryo wrestler Kanechika takes over the Miyagino stable, replacing the former maegashira Chikubayama, mentor of Hakuho, who stays on as an assistant coach. The new Miyagino Oyakata has no connection to the stable, having wrestled for Kitanoumi stable, but he has been adopted by the widow of a previous head of the stable.

=== September ===
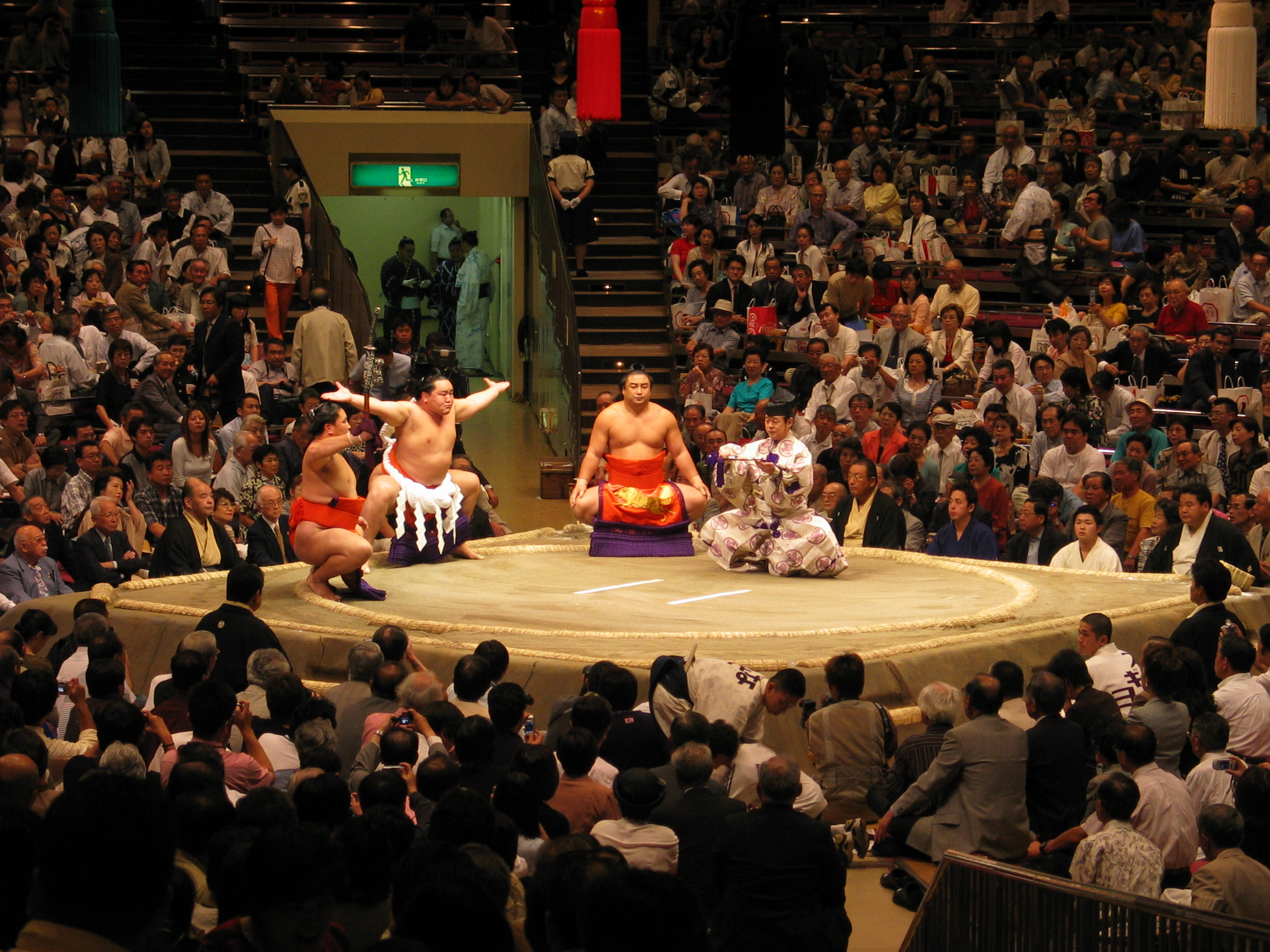
Asashoryu accompanied by Asasekiryu and Kaiho during the September 2004 tournament.

- At the Aki basho in Tokyo, Asashoryu's chance for a clean sweep of the 2004 tournaments is dashed when he pulls off a poor 9–6 record and Kaio gets his 5th championship with a 13–2 record. Asashoryu's mediocre performance is attributed to a lack of training due to his wedding reception on 31 August. Tochinonada and Kyokushuzan finish runners-up on 11–4, with Tochinonada receiving the Outstanding Performance Prize, while Roho and Kotonowaka each score ten and share the Fighting Spirit award. Musoyama and Tochiazuma both drop out through injury and will be kadoban in November. Ama wins the juryo championship with an 11–4 score. Tamaasuka wins the makushita title with a perfect 7–0 record and reaches the sekitori ranks for the first time. Hagiwara is promoted to the top division alongside Ama, changing his name to Kisenosato. At 18 years and 3 months he is the second youngest after Takanohana II to achieve this.
- Former sekiwake Masudayama of the Kasugano stable leaves to open his own Chiganoura stable.

=== October ===
- 2: The retirement ceremony or danpatsu-shiki of the 67th yokozuna Musashimaru takes place at the Kokugikan.

=== November ===
- At the Kyushu basho, Asashoryu comes back with a 13–2 championship, his 9th overall. Kaio needed 13 wins to gain promotion to yokozuna but after losing to Kotomitsuki on opening day, Hakuho on Day 10 and Miyabiyama on Day 12 can only manage a runner-up score of 12–3 in his hometown tournament, just one win short. Musoyama announces his retirement on Day 3 and Tochiazuma is demoted once again after pulling out on Day 6, leaving Kaio and Chiyotaikai as the only ozeki. Maegashira 1 Hakuho is runner-up alongside Kaio and receives the Outstanding Performance Prize. Sekiwake Wakanosato records an impressive 11–4 and wins the Technique Award. The Fighting Spirit Award goes to Kotooshu who also scores 11 wins in his second makuuchi tournament. Ishide wins the juryo championship. Former maegashira Oikari retires.

== Deaths ==
- 29 February: the 42nd Yokozuna Kagamisato, aged 80.
- 7 August: Yoshimura Ryuta, a sandanme ranked wrestler at Tagonoura stable, aged 17, of multiple organ failure due to meningitis.
- 16 October: Nakabuchi Koichi, a makushita wrestler at Takanohana stable, aged 32, of heart failure.

== See also ==
- Glossary of sumo terms
- List of past sumo wrestlers
- List of years in sumo
- List of yokozuna
