= Shunketsu Yūji =

Japanese sumo wrestler (born 1976)

Personal information
- Native name: 駿傑 悠志
- Born: Yūji Ishide; July 13, 1976 (age 50) Saitama, Japan
- Height: 1.76 m (5 ft 9 1/2 in)
- Weight: 123 kg (271 lb)

Sport
- Sport: Sumo
- Retired: March 2008
- Heya: Hanaregoma
- Record: 461-434-17
- Debut: March 1992
- Highest rank: Maegashira 12 (September 2005)
- Championships: 1 (Jūryō); 1 (Makushita)
- Updated on March 2008

Shunketsu Yūji (born July 13, 1976 as Yūji Ishide) is a former sumo wrestler from Misato, Saitama, Japan. The highest rank he reached was maegashira 12.

== Career ==
Shunketsu made his professional debut in March 1992, alongside several future top division regulars such as Kyokushuzan, Wakanosato and Takanowaka. He weighed only just over 100 kg (220 lb) and remained one of the lightest wrestlers in the senior ranks, only managing to put on around 20 kg (44 lb) in subsequent years.

Shunketsu used several different shikona during his career. He began using his own surname, Ishide. Upon promotion to sekitori status for the first time in January 2001 he was given the name Komahikari. However, after falling back to the unsalaried makushita division he reverted to Ishide. He retained this name until November 2005 when he became Shunketsu.

Restricted by diabetes and several injuries, Shunketsu took 78 tournaments from his professional debut to reach the top makuuchi division for the first time in March 2005, which at the time was the tenth slowest ever. He spent only five tournaments in makuuchi and only made kachi-koshi there once. He was ranked in the second jūryō division for 25 tournaments. He was the last sekitori from the now defunct Hanaregoma stable, which once produced yokozuna Onokuni.

After falling from the top division with a 4-11 record in January 2006 he rarely looked like returning, managing to win more than 8 bouts on only one occasion (in July 2006 when he slid to the bottom of the second division at jūryō 13 West and produced a 10-5 score). From November 2006 to May 2007 he managed four consecutive winning scores (eight wins each time), which took him up to jūryō 1 West, but he had five consecutive losing scores after that. After a 3-12 record in March 2008 at the rank of jūryō 11 West, and facing certain demotion to the third division, he announced his retirement.

He won one yusho or tournament title in the makushita division (a perfect 7-0 score in November 2000 which earned him automatic promotion to the jūryō division for the first time), and one in the jūryō division (a 12-3 score in November 2004).

== Fighting style ==
Shunketsu was predominantly a yotsu-sumo wrestler, preferring grappling as opposed to pushing and thrusting techniques. His favoured grip on the opponent's mawashi was hidari-yotsu, with his right hand outside and left hand inside his opponent's arms. He also regularly employed henka, or sidestepping at the tachi-ai or initial charge.

== Career record ==
Shunketsu Yūji
Year	January Hatsu basho, Tokyo	March Haru basho, Osaka	May Natsu basho, Tokyo	July Nagoya basho, Nagoya	September Aki basho, Tokyo	November Kyūshū basho, Fukuoka
1992	x	(Maezumo)	West Jonokuchi #10; 4–3	East Jonidan #128; 6–1	East Jonidan #50; 4–3	West Jonidan #23; 3–4
1993	West Jonidan #49; 6–1	East Sandanme #88; 3–4	East Jonidan #6; 4–3	West Sandanme #80; 4–3	East Sandanme #60; 3–4	East Sandanme #77; 3–4
1994	West Sandanme #90; 6–1	East Sandanme #36; 4–3	West Sandanme #18; 4–3	East Sandanme #6; 3–4	East Sandanme #21; 5–2	West Makushita #56; 4–3
1995	West Makushita #45; 4–3	West Makushita #33; 5–2	West Makushita #20; 2–5	West Makushita #40; 3–4	East Makushita #52; 4–3	East Makushita #43; 5–2
1996	East Makushita #25; 2–5	West Makushita #46; 3–4	West Sandanme #1; 2–5	East Sandanme #25; 5–2	East Makushita #60; 4–3	East Makushita #51; 4–3
1997	West Makushita #40; 4–3	West Makushita #31; 4–3	West Makushita #23; 5–2	East Makushita #12; 3–4	West Makushita #18; 2–5	East Makushita #36; 3–4
1998	West Makushita #46; 6–1	West Makushita #21; 4–3	East Makushita #17; 4–3	East Makushita #13; 5–2	West Makushita #5; 0–6–1	West Makushita #40; 5–2
1999	East Makushita #26; 5–2	East Makushita #15; 2–5	East Makushita #31; 5–2	West Makushita #17; 5–2	West Makushita #7; 3–4	East Makushita #13; 3–4
2000	East Makushita #20; 6–1	East Makushita #7; 3–4	East Makushita #12; 3–4	East Makushita #19; 5–2	West Makushita #8; 5–2	West Makushita #3; 7–0; Champion
2001	East Jūryō #8; 7–8	East Jūryō #9; 3–12	West Makushita #5; 1–6	West Makushita #21; 4–3	West Makushita #15; 5–2	East Makushita #8; 6–1
2002	West Makushita #1; 3–4	East Makushita #5; 5–2	West Jūryō #12; 10–5	West Jūryō #5; Sat out due to injury 0–0–15	West Jūryō #5; 9–6	West Jūryō #2; 7–8
2003	East Jūryō #4; 9–6	East Jūryō #1; 4–11	West Jūryō #6; 2–13	East Makushita #4; 2–5	West Makushita #18; 4–3	East Makushita #15; 3–4
2004	East Makushita #21; 6–1	East Makushita #6; 4–3	East Makushita #4; 3–4	West Makushita #8; 5–2	East Makushita #3; 5–2	West Jūryō #13; 12–3; Champion
2005	West Jūryō #4; 9–6	East Maegashira #17; 6–9	West Jūryō #1; 8–7	East Maegashira #17; 9–6	West Maegashira #12; 7–8	West Maegashira #13; 6–9
2006	East Maegashira #15; 4–11	West Jūryō #5; 6–9	East Jūryō #9; 6–9	West Jūryō #13; 10–5	East Jūryō #7; 6–9	West Jūryō #10; 8–6–1
2007	East Jūryō #9; 8–7	East Jūryō #8; 8–7	West Jūryō #5; 8–7	West Jūryō #1; 5–10	East Jūryō #5; 7–8	East Jūryō #6; 7–8
2008	West Jūryō #7; 5–10	West Jūryō #11; Retired; 3–12	x	x	x	x
Record given as wins–losses–absences Top division champion Top division runner-up Retired Lower divisions Non-participation Sanshō key: F=Fighting spirit; O=Outstanding performance; T=Technique Also shown: ★=Kinboshi; P=Playoff(s); Divisions: Makuuchi — Jūryō — Makushita — Sandanme — Jonidan — Jonokuchi Makuuchi ranks: Yokozuna — Ōzeki — Sekiwake — Komusubi — Maegashira

== See also ==
- List of sumo tournament second division champions
- Glossary of sumo terms
- List of past sumo wrestlers
