= Kakizoe Tōru =

Japanese sumo wrestler

垣添 徹 Kakizoe Tōru
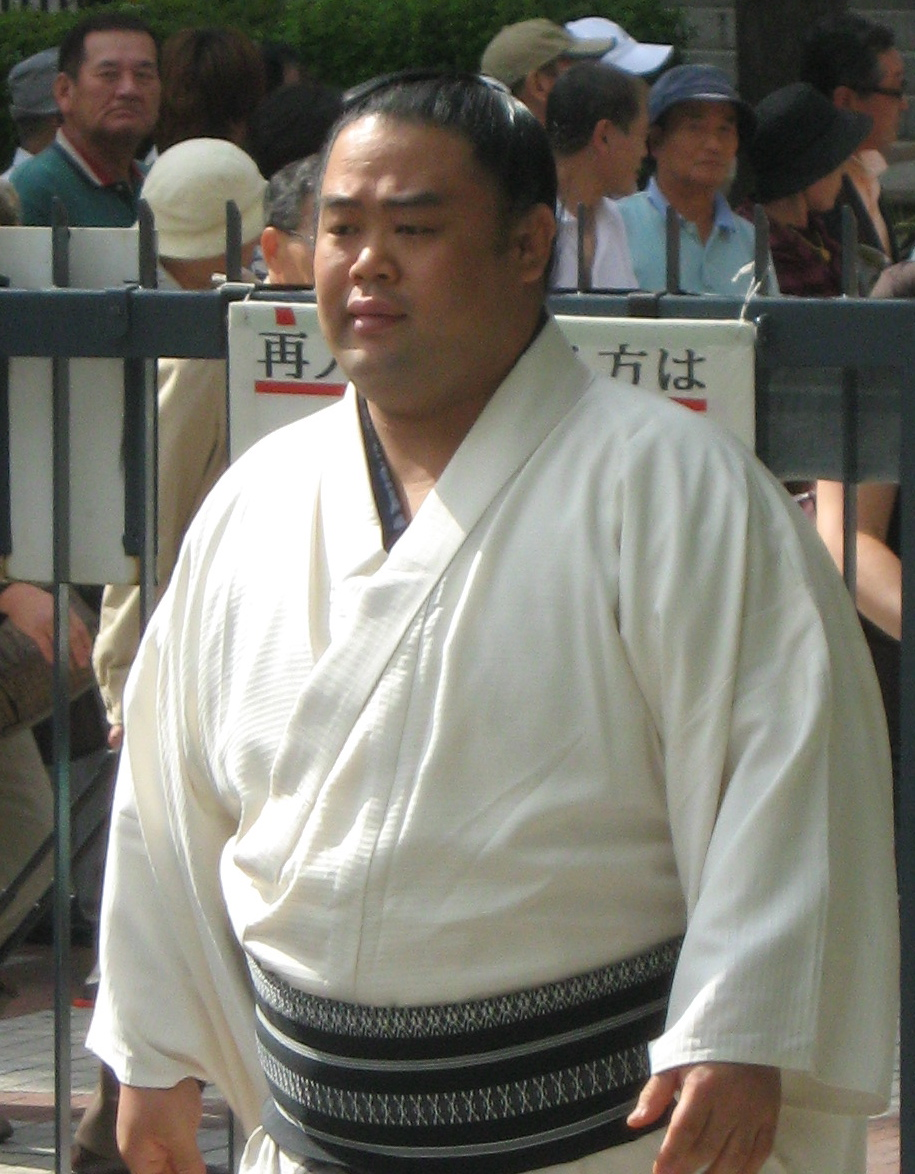
- Kakizoe in September 2016

Personal information
- Born: Kakizoe Tōru; August 12, 1978 (age 48) Ōita
- Height: 1.78 m (5 ft 10 in)
- Weight: 139 kg (306 lb; 21.9 st)

Sport
- Sport: Sumo
- University team: Nippon Sport Science University
- Retired: April 2012
- Heya: Fujishima
- Record: 388-430-15
- Debut: September 2001
- Highest rank: Komusubi (March 2004)
- Elder name: Ikazuchi
- Championships: 1 (Jūryō)
- Special Prizes: Technique (1)
- Updated on October 1, 2020

Kakizoe Tōru (垣添 徹, Kakizoe Tōru) (born August 12, 1978 in Usa City, Ōita Prefecture, Japan), is a former sumo wrestler. A former amateur champion, he turned professional in 2001 and reached the top division in 2003. His highest rank was komusubi, which he held for just one tournament. He won one special prize, for Technique. After injury problems he fell to the third makushita division in 2011 and retired in April 2012, becoming a sumo coach. He was part of ex-yokozuna Musashimaru's Musashigawa stable from 2013 until 2020, when he moved to Irumagawa stable. He is now a sumo elder, under the name Ikazuchi (雷).

== Career ==
Kakizoe was an amateur sumo champion at Nippon Sport Science University, winning the Kokutai (Japan Games) and the All Japan University Championship in 2000, his final year, which earned him the amateur yokozuna title. He joined Musashigawa stable, which, at the time, was one of the strongest in sumo with yokozuna Musashimaru and other successful former collegiate competitors such as Dejima and Miyabiyama amongst its wrestlers. Because of his amateur success, Kakizoe was given makushita tsukedashi status, meaning he was able to debut at the makushita 15 ranking. He was the first makushita tsukedashi entrant to be put at #15 instead of the bottom of the makushita division. He had initially hoped to debut in March 2001, but his entry was delayed because of a nagging injury. Although his first appearance on the banzuke was in September 2001, he was still unable to compete and dropped to makushita #55. He fought his first professional bout in November 2001 instead, fighting under his real name. Unusually, he never adopted a traditional shikona. He rose to the jūryō division in March 2003 and the top makuuchi division in September 2003.

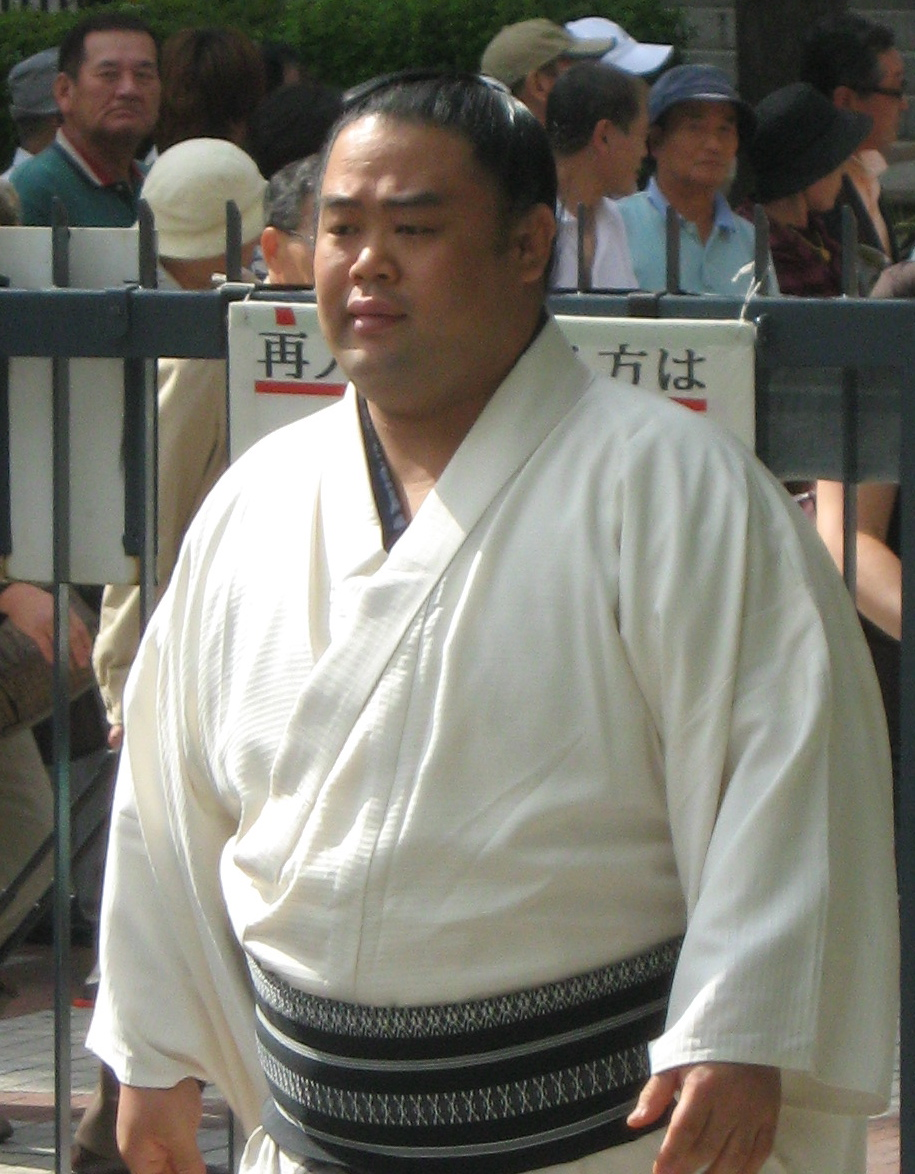
Kakizoe in September 2008

Kakizoe's rank peaked at komusubi after the January 2004 tournament when, ranked maegashira 5, he achieved a result of 11-4 and the technique prize. He failed to retain his san'yaku rank for more than a single tournament, but mostly remained amongst the top half of maegashira for the next few years. However, he suffered a big setback in May 2007, losing eleven bouts in a row before pulling out of the tournament citing a fracture to his right knee. He could manage only six wins on his return in July and slid to the lowest rung on the top division ladder for the September tournament. He produced a comfortable 9-6 score there to maintain his top division status, but remained near the bottom of makuuchi for the next two years.

In January 2010, he rose to maegashira 4 and fought his first bout against a yokozuna since his injury. Due to the absence of Chiyotaikai and Kotomitsuki, on the final day he took part in the san'yaku soroibumi ceremony. He finished the tournament with a respectable 6-9 record, but was unable to produce a kachi-koshi or winning score in the next four tournaments either.

Kakizoe's 3-12 performance in September 2010 saw him demoted to jūryō for the first time and he lost sekitori status after scoring only 4-11 at Juryo 9 in January 2011. Despite only scoring a make-koshi 3-4 in the May 2011 "technical examination" tournament, he was nonetheless promoted back to jūryō because of the large number of slots available after the forced retirements of many wrestlers following a match-fixing scandal. However, his return to jūryō was short-lived as he turned in a disastrous 1-14 score, his ninth consecutive make-koshi.

== Retirement from sumo ==
Troubled by a foot injury, Kakizoe fell to makushita 56 for the May 2012 tournament, at the time the sixth lowest rank ever held by a former san'yaku wrestler. He announced his retirement before the tournament began, and stayed in sumo as a coach at his stable (now renamed Fujishima stable) under the elder name Oshiogawa-oyakata. In October 2012, he switched to the Ikazuchi name. In August 2013, when his former stablemate Musashimaru established his own Musashigawa stable, Kakizoe moved with him. In October 2020 he moved to Irumagawa stable. It was announced after the January 2023 tournament that on February 1 he would be taking over as head coach of the stable, which would be changing its name to Ikazuchi stable accordingly, due to the imminent retirement of Irumagawa Oyakata (former sekiwake Tochitsukasa).

== Fighting style ==
Kakizoe was an oshi-sumo specialist, preferring pushing and thrusting techniques. His most common winning move was oshi-dashi (push-out), which accounted for around 43 percent of his career victories. He was vulnerable to defeat if his opponents grab hold of his mawashi.

== Family ==
Kakizoe is married, with two children. His wife, Eimi, is a former amateur sumo wrestler who won the Sumo World Championships. His eldest son, Haruku, was a member of the renowned Saitama Sakae High School sumo club. His son made his professional debut at the July 2026 tournament under his real last name (Kakizoe).

== Career record ==
Kakizoe Tōru
Year	January Hatsu basho, Tokyo	March Haru basho, Osaka	May Natsu basho, Tokyo	July Nagoya basho, Nagoya	September Aki basho, Tokyo	November Kyūshū basho, Fukuoka
2001	x	x	x	x	Makushita tsukedashi #15; Sat out due to injury 0–0–7	East Makushita #55; 6–1
2002	West Makushita #26; 4–3	East Makushita #23; 6–1	West Makushita #8; 1–1–5	West Makushita #28; 4–3	West Makushita #20; 4–3	East Makushita #14; 6–1
2003	East Makushita #3; 5–2	East Jūryō #11; 9–6	East Jūryō #6; 10–5	East Jūryō #2; 11–4; Champion	East Maegashira #11; 8–7	West Maegashira #8; 8–7
2004	East Maegashira #5; 11–4; T	East Komusubi #1; 6–9	West Maegashira #2; 6–9	West Maegashira #5; 7–8	West Maegashira #6; 10–5	East Maegashira #2; 6–9
2005	West Maegashira #4; 8–7	West Maegashira #2; 6–9	West Maegashira #5; 9–6	East Maegashira #1; 7–8	East Maegashira #2; 7–8	West Maegashira #2; 4–11
2006	West Maegashira #7; 8–7	East Maegashira #6; 9–6	West Maegashira #1; 6–9	West Maegashira #3; 4–11	West Maegashira #8; 9–6	West Maegashira #4; 6–9
2007	East Maegashira #9; 8–7	West Maegashira #6; 8–7	East Maegashira #3; 0–12–3	East Maegashira #16; 6–9	West Maegashira #16; 9–6	East Maegashira #14; 9–6
2008	East Maegashira #11; 6–9	West Maegashira #14; 8–7	East Maegashira #13; 6–9	West Maegashira #15; 7–8	West Maegashira #16; 10–5	East Maegashira #8; 5–10
2009	West Maegashira #12; 8–7	East Maegashira #12; 7–8	West Maegashira #14; 8–7	West Maegashira #8; 6–9	East Maegashira #11; 9–6	West Maegashira #5; 8–7
2010	East Maegashira #4; 6–9	West Maegashira #7; 7–8	East Maegashira #8; 7–8	West Maegashira #9; 3–12	West Maegashira #15; 3–12	East Jūryō #7; 7–8
2011	West Jūryō #9; 4–11	Tournament Cancelled; 0–0–0	West Makushita #1; 3–4	West Jūryō #11; 1–14	East Makushita #9; 4–3	West Makushita #6; 1–6
2012	West Makushita #16; 3–4	West Makushita #22; 0–7	West Makushita #56; Retired –	x	x	x
Record given as wins–losses–absences Top division champion Top division runner-up Retired Lower divisions Non-participation Sanshō key: F=Fighting spirit; O=Outstanding performance; T=Technique Also shown: ★=Kinboshi; P=Playoff(s); Divisions: Makuuchi — Jūryō — Makushita — Sandanme — Jonidan — Jonokuchi Makuuchi ranks: Yokozuna — Ōzeki — Sekiwake — Komusubi — Maegashira

== See also ==
- Glossary of sumo terms
- List of sumo tournament second division champions
- List of past sumo wrestlers
- List of sumo elders
- List of komusubi
