= Tokitenkū Yoshiaki =

Mongolian sumo wrestler (1979–2017)

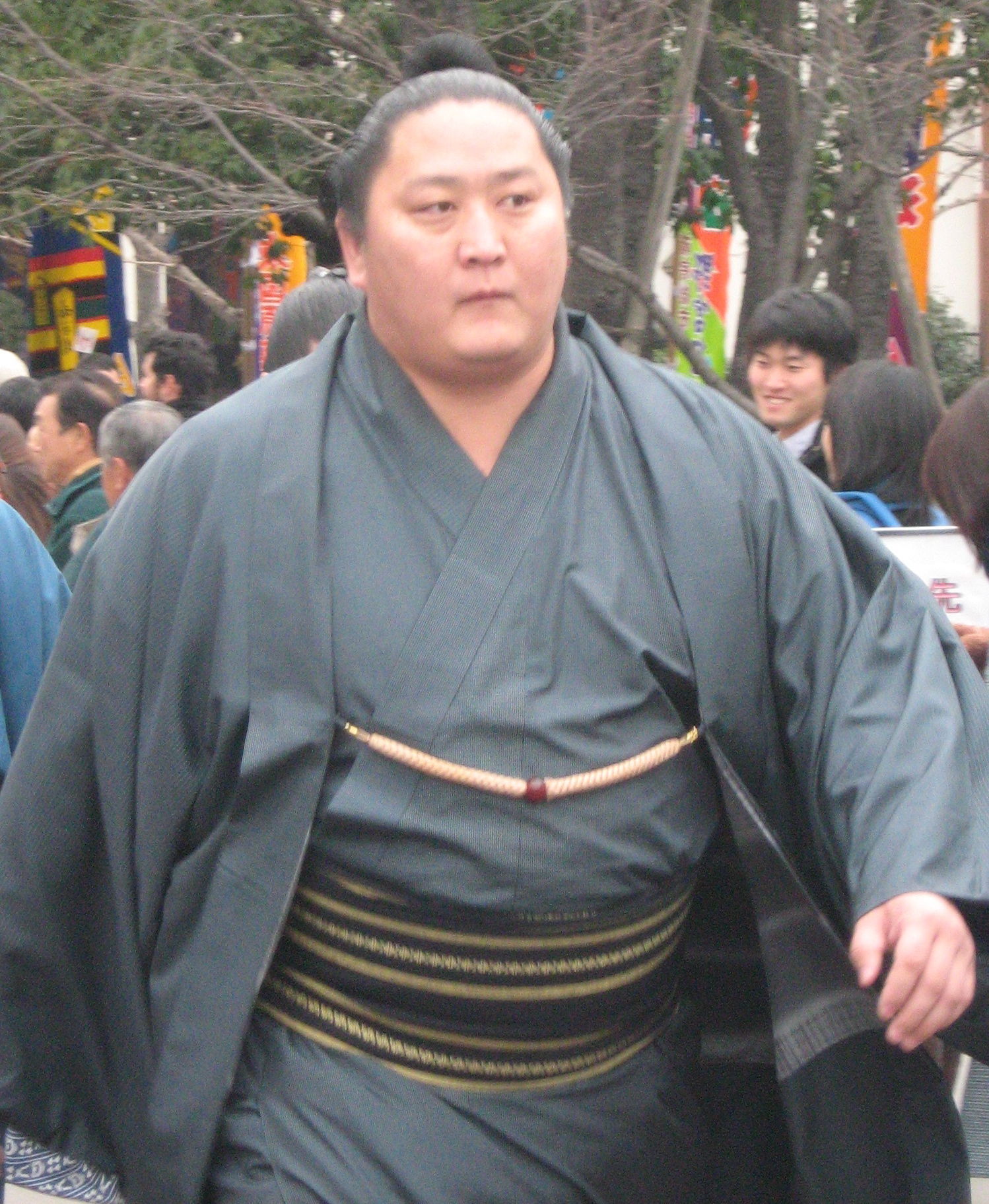

Personal information
- Native name: 時天空 慶晃
- Born: Altangadasyn Khüchitbaatar; 10 September 1979 Töv Province, Mongolia
- Died: 31 January 2017 (aged 37) Tokyo, Japan
- Height: 185 cm (6 ft 1 in)
- Weight: 141 kg (311 lb; 22 st 3 lb)

Sport
- Sport: Sumo
- University team: Tokyo University of Agriculture
- Retired: August 2016
- Heya: Tokitsukaze
- Record: 548-545-56
- Debut: July 2002
- Highest rank: Komusubi (March 2007)
- Championships: 2 (Jūryō); 1 (Sandanme); 1 (Jonidan); 1 (Jonokuchi)
- Special Prizes: Technique (1)

Altangadasyn Khüchitbaatar
Medal record

Men's Sumo

Representing Mongolia

World Games
Silver medal – second place	2001 Akita	Middleweight

Tokitenkū Yoshiaki (時天空 慶晃, Tokitenkū Yoshiaki; born as Altangadasyn Khüchitbaatar, Mongolian: Алтангадасын Хүчитбаатар; September 10, 1979 – January 31, 2017) was a sumo wrestler.

He made his professional debut in 2002, reaching the top makuuchi division just two years later. The highest rank he reached was komusubi, which he held on three separate occasions, but never retained for more than one tournament. He earned one special prize, for Technique. He wrestled for the Tokitsukaze stable and acquired Japanese citizenship in 2014.

Tokitenkū was diagnosed with malignant lymphoma in 2015 and retired from sumo in 2016 to become a coach; he was the first Mongolian-born wrestler to acquire the right to remain with the Sumo Association as a coach following retirement as an active wrestler. He died in January 2017.

== Early life and sumo background ==
Born in Töv Province, Mongolia, Tokitenkū was the son of a Mongolian wrestler, who reached a rank equivalent to komusubi in Mongolian wrestling. He first came to Japan in March 2000 to study at Tokyo University of Agriculture, having deferred his studies at Mongolian State University of Agriculture.

Although he joined the university's sumo club and won the under 100 kg collegiate championships in his first year, he originally intended to return to Mongolia to teach what he had learned about agricultural administration and food technology in Japan.

He was inspired to enter professional sumo by watching active wrestlers Asashōryū and Asasekiryū, with whom he had practised judo as a teenager in Ulaanbaatar. He joined Tokitsukaze stable when in his second year of university, just before reaching the upper age limit of 23 set by the Japan Sumo Association. He graduated from the Tokyo University of Agriculture in March 2004.

== Career ==
Upon entry he was given the shikona or fighting name of Tokitenkū, a reference to Mongolia's clear sky. He began his career in July 2002, winning all of his first 22 official bouts and earning three consecutive division championships in the process. He was the third person to achieve the feat of three consecutive championships, and his 22 consecutive wins tied the record for fourth-highest, with only Jokoryu (27) and Itai and Tochiazuma (26) having a longer unbeaten run upon entering professional sumo. He progressed to the second highest jūryō division in March 2004 and, just two tournaments later, to the top makuuchi division. It took him only 12 tournaments from his professional debut to make the top division, which at the time was the equal-fastest rise since the format of six tournaments per year was introduced in 1958.

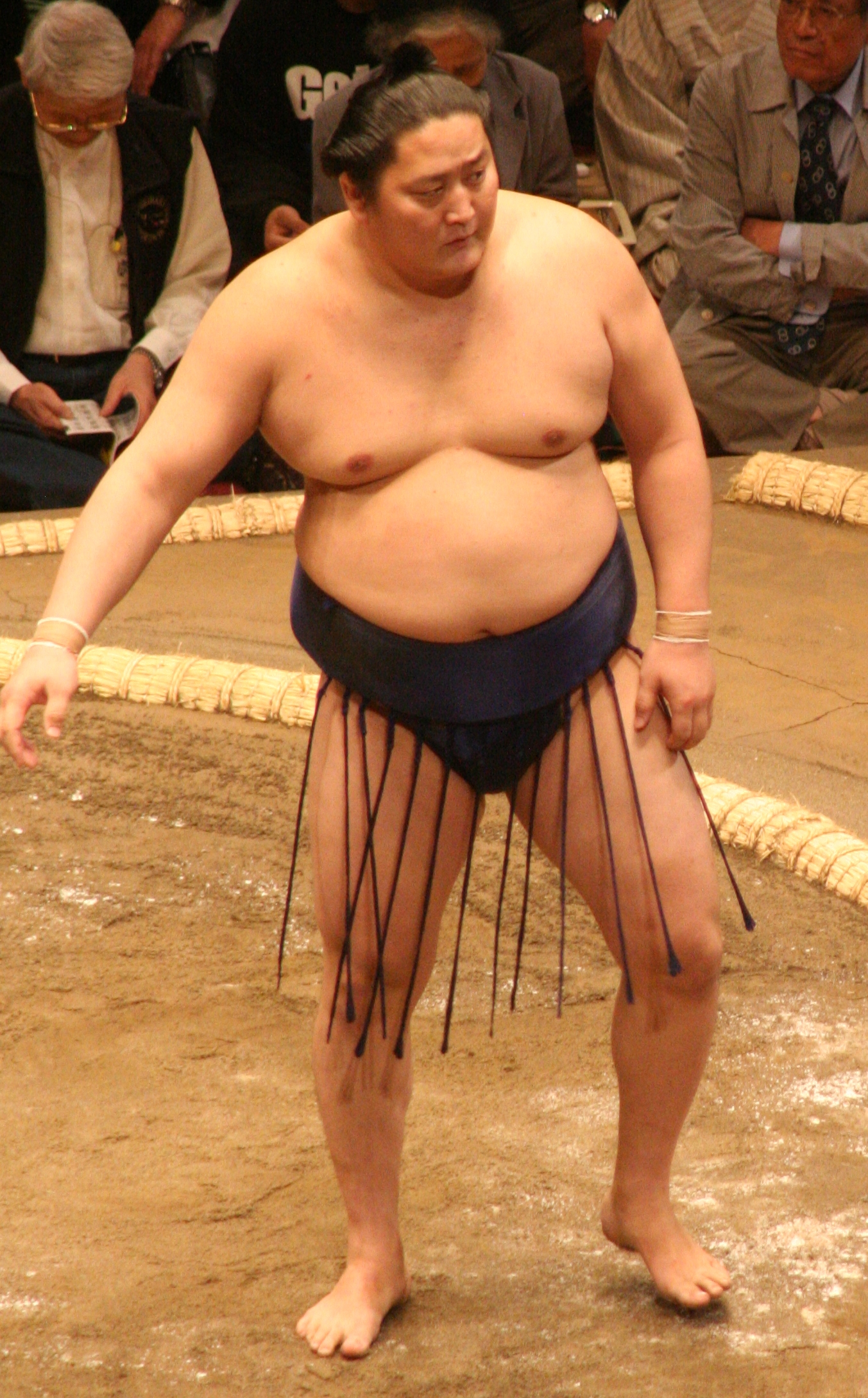
Tokitenku in May 2009

He was not able at first to maintain his makuuchi position, dropping back to jūryō twice, but a result of 10–5 in November 2005 gained him the rank of maegashira 1 as well as the technique prize. He made his san'yaku or titled rank debut in March 2007 at komusubi, where he defeated yokozuna Asashōryū on the opening day but missed out on another special prize by falling just short of a majority of wins, posting a 7–8 score. He returned to komusubi in July 2007, but again scored 7–8. In 2008 he suffered make-koshi (i.e. a losing record of 7-8 or worse) at all six tournaments of the year.

He pulled out of the January 2010 tournament on Day 10 after dislocating his big toe; this was his first career withdrawal. He came back strongly posting three winning records in the next three tournaments, which sent him up to maegashira 1 for the September 2010 tournament. However, there he recorded a disastrous 2–13 score.

Tokitenkū returned to the komusubi rank for the first time in 35 tournaments in July 2013, the second longest post-1925 wait for a san'yaku return after Aobajō's 47 tournament wait between 1975 and 1983.

Tokitenkū achieved this despite being ranked as low as maegashira 8 in May. A series of poor performances after that saw him demoted to jūryō for the first time since 2005, but he secured an immediate return to the top division with a 10–5 at the rank of jūryō 3 in March 2014. He repeated this achievement once again when he was demoted in September 2014 and bounced back with a jūryō championship to again return to the top division. In 2015, he completed two tournaments in the top division, dropped back to jūryō in May and returned to the top division one tournament later.

After losing records in July and September 2015 he withdrew from the November tournament after being diagnosed with malignant lymphoma.

Having been in and out of hospital since October, he also withdrew from the January 2016 tournament to discuss his future with his stablemaster before the spring tournament in Osaka. After missing his fifth consecutive tournament in July 2016, his rank on the banzuke had dropped through the un-salaried ranks to West 26 in the fourth-tier Sandanme division.

== Retirement and death ==
The Japan Sumo Association announced on August 26, 2016, that Tokitenkū had retired. He had become a Japanese citizen in January 2014 and had purchased the Magaki kabu (elder stock) in May 2014 from former yokozuna Wakanohana Kanji II, making him the first Mongolian-born wrestler to acquire the right to remain with the sumo association following retirement. He became known as Magaki Oyakata and worked as a coach at Tokitsukaze stable, the second Mongolian-born wrestler to remain as a coach after Kyokutenhō.

Speaking about his condition he said that "with prolonged treatment it was difficult to return to physical strength and continue sumo." He recalled his most memorable bout as being his playoff win for the sandanme championship in January 2003, against his stablemate Toyonoshima.

Tokitenkū died on 31 January 2017 at the age of 37. He had been housebound since October, and was unable to perform his oyakata duties at the November 2016 and January 2017 tournaments.

== Fighting style ==
When Tokitenkū began his sumo career he weighed around 113 kg (249 lb; 17 st 11 lb), but he gained weight steadily and reached about 150 kg (330 lb; 23 st 9 lb), average for the top division. He favoured a migi-yotsu grip on the mawashi, with his left hand outside and right hand inside his opponent's arms. His most common winning technique was yori-kiri, or force out, although he also relied on pull-down techniques such as hataki-komi and hiki-otoshi. He was fond of throwing moves (nage). He was very adept at using tripping techniques which he had gained from his experience in judo, winning 17 career bouts by uchigake (inside leg trip).

He was known for attempting the pulling inside ankle sweep ketaguri at the tachi-ai or initial charge, which he successfully used nineteen times in his career. He also used the extremely rare trip nimaigeri (ankle kicking twist down) on fourteen occasions, although he was not credited with the technique in the top division until May 2011 in a win over Shōtenrō.

== Career record ==
Tokitenkū Yoshiaki
Year	January Hatsu basho, Tokyo	March Haru basho, Osaka	May Natsu basho, Tokyo	July Nagoya basho, Nagoya	September Aki basho, Tokyo	November Kyūshū basho, Fukuoka
2002	x	x	x	(Maezumo)	West Jonokuchi #40; 7–0; Champion	East Jonidan #30; 7–0–P; Champion
2003	West Sandanme #33; 7–0–P; Champion	East Makushita #22; 5–2	East Makushita #11; 4–3	West Makushita #6; 4–3	East Makushita #4; 4–3	West Makushita #1; 3–4
2004	East Makushita #3; 5–2	East Jūryō #11; 8–7	West Jūryō #10; 12–3; Champion	East Maegashira #17; 6–9	West Jūryō #2; 9–6	West Maegashira #15; 7–8
2005	West Maegashira #17; 6–9	West Jūryō #2; 10–5	West Maegashira #15; 8–7	East Maegashira #12; 9–6	West Maegashira #6; 7–8	West Maegashira #7; 10–5; T
2006	West Maegashira #1; 5–10	West Maegashira #6; 8–7	East Maegashira #4; 5–10	East Maegashira #8; 10–5	West Maegashira #2; 7–8	East Maegashira #3; 9–6
2007	East Maegashira #2; 8–7	West Komusubi #1; 7–8	West Maegashira #1; 8–7	East Komusubi #1; 7–8	East Maegashira #1; 6–9	West Maegashira #3; 9–6
2008	West Maegashira #1; 6–9	East Maegashira #3; 7–8	East Maegashira #4; 6–9	West Maegashira #6; 7–8	West Maegashira #7; 6–9	West Maegashira #9; 7–8
2009	East Maegashira #10; 9–6	West Maegashira #3; 5–10	East Maegashira #9; 7–8	West Maegashira #10; 9–6	West Maegashira #4; 8–7	West Maegashira #2; 5–10
2010	East Maegashira #8; 5–5–5	East Maegashira #13; 10–5	East Maegashira #6; 8–7	West Maegashira #3; 8–7	East Maegashira #1; 2–13	West Maegashira #11; 8–7
2011	West Maegashira #8; 6–9	Tournament Cancelled; 0–0–0	West Maegashira #13; 8–7	East Maegashira #7; 8–7	West Maegashira #4; 6–9	East Maegashira #7; 6–9
2012	East Maegashira #10; 11–4	East Maegashira #2; 3–12	East Maegashira #9; 7–8	West Maegashira #9; 9–6	East Maegashira #6; 6–9	East Maegashira #8; 7–8
2013	East Maegashira #9; 10–5	East Maegashira #3; 5–10	East Maegashira #8; 10–5	West Komusubi; 4–11	East Maegashira #5; 5–10	East Maegashira #10; 6–9
2014	West Maegashira #13; 4–11	East Jūryō #3; 10–5	West Maegashira #14; 7–8	West Maegashira #15; 7–8	East Maegashira #16; 6–9	East Jūryō #1; 12–3; Champion
2015	West Maegashira #13; 9–6	West Maegashira #8; 3–12	East Jūryō #1; 10–5	East Maegashira #11; 6–9	West Maegashira #13; 7–8	West Maegashira #14; Sat out due to injury 0–0–15
2016	East Jūryō #9; Sat out due to injury 0–0–15	West Makushita #6; Sat out due to injury 0–0–7	West Makushita #46; Sat out due to injury 0–0–7	West Sandanme #26; Sat out due to injury 0–0–7	East Sandanme #87; Retired –	x
Record given as wins–losses–absences Top division champion Top division runner-up Retired Lower divisions Non-participation Sanshō key: F=Fighting spirit; O=Outstanding performance; T=Technique Also shown: ★=Kinboshi; P=Playoff(s); Divisions: Makuuchi — Jūryō — Makushita — Sandanme — Jonidan — Jonokuchi Makuuchi ranks: Yokozuna — Ōzeki — Sekiwake — Komusubi — Maegashira

== See also ==
- Glossary of sumo terms
- List of past sumo wrestlers
- List of Mongolian sumo wrestlers
- List of non-Japanese sumo wrestlers
- List of sumo record holders
- List of sumo second division champions
- List of komusubi
