= Ryūō Noboru =

Mongolian sumo wrestler

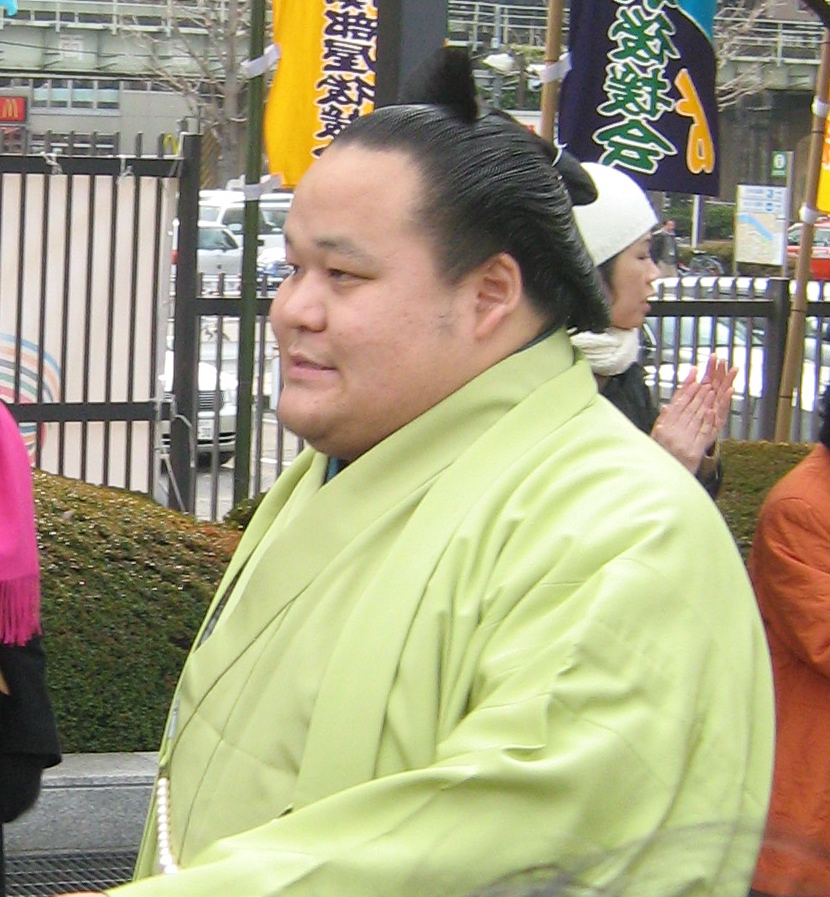

Personal information
- Native name: 龍皇 昇
- Born: Erkhem-Ochiryn Sanchirbold; March 11, 1983 (age 43) Mongolia
- Height: 1.76 m (5 ft 9 1/2 in)
- Weight: 147 kg (324 lb)

Sport
- Sport: Sumo
- Retired: July, 2013
- Heya: Miyagino
- Record: 340-322-11
- Debut: March, 2000
- Highest rank: Maegashira 8 (July, 2007)
- Updated on July 2013

Ryūō Noboru (born March 11, 1983, as Erkhem-Ochiryn Sanchirbold, Mongolian: Эрхэм-Очирын Санчирболд) is a former professional sumo wrestler from Ulan-Bator, Mongolia. His highest rank was maegashira 8.

== Career ==
He joined sumo in March 2000, shortly before his 17th birthday, making him young by the standards of most foreign recruits. He took part in a seven way play-off for the title in the third makushita division in January 2003, but his progress was slowed by a neck injury that forced him to sit out the November 2003 tournament. After a year of steady progress he won promotion to the second highest jūryō division in July 2006. He entered the top makuuchi division in May 2007, producing a 10–5 record at maegashira 14. However he could manage only five wins in the next tournament and was demoted back to the second division after a 3–12 score in September 2007. An 8–7 mark at the rank of jūryō 2 in January 2008 was enough to return him to the top division but he could not manage a winning score and so was demoted once again. In May 2008 he turned in a disappointing 5-10 score at jūryō 5. In July he recovered from a poor 1-6 start to finish 8–7. However a 4–11 mark at jūryō 10 in November 2008 saw him fall back to the unsalaried makushita division for the January 2009 tournament. He withdrew from that tournament with an injury after recording only one win and two losses, and produced another losing score of 3-4 in March 2009. For the rest of his career, he remained firmly stuck in the mid-to-lower makushita ranks, without even coming close to a return to jūryō.

Ryūō was from the same stable as yokozuna Hakuhō, and as he was the only other wrestler with sekitori experience in the stable, he was Hakuhō's main training partner. After losing sekitori status he also served as the yokozuna's personal attendant or tsukebito. In September 2010 he was rebuked by the Japan Sumo Association for visiting the locker room of Hakuhō's opponent, Aran, prior to the match.

== Retirement from sumo ==
Ryūō retired from sumo in July 2013. His danpatsu-shiki was held on September 1, 2013. He was presented with a specially-made “kantosho” trophy by Hakuhō to make up for the fact that he missed out on the Fighting Spirit Award in his top division debut despite ten wins. He has maintained his connection with Hakuhō by working as his personal manager, and marrying the daughter of Hakuhō’s aunt.

In August 2023, he opened a chankonabe restaurant called "Chanko Dining Ryū". The restaurant specializes in repurposing wrestlers from Miyagino stable and chanko recipes prepared during the Hakuhō era.

== Fighting style ==
Unlike most of his Mongolian compatriots, Ryūō specialised in pushing rather than throwing techniques and he was noted for his strong tachi-ai, or opening charge at the beginning of matches. Like many pusher-thrusters, however, he was vulnerable to throws by opponents more skilled on the mawashi if he was unable to win in the first few seconds.

== Career record ==
Ryūō Noboru
| Year | January Hatsu basho, Tokyo | March Haru basho, Osaka | May Natsu basho, Tokyo | July Nagoya basho, Nagoya | September Aki basho, Tokyo | November Kyūshū basho, Fukuoka |
|---|---|---|---|---|---|---|
| 2000 | x | (Maezumo) | East Jonokuchi #13; 4–3 | West Jonidan #134; 6–1 | West Jonidan #54; 4–3 | West Jonidan #29; 5–2 |
| 2001 | West Sandanme #94; 4–3 | East Sandanme #77; 4–3 | East Sandanme #60; 3–4 | East Sandanme #73; 5–2 | East Sandanme #41; 4–3 | West Sandanme #27; 3–4 |
| 2002 | West Sandanme #45; 4–3 | West Sandanme #30; 3–4 | East Sandanme #52; 5–2 | East Sandanme #27; 5–2 | East Sandanme #3; 4–3 | West Makushita #51; 5–2 |
| 2003 | West Makushita #33; 6–1–P | East Makushita #13; 2–5 | West Makushita #30; 2–5 | West Makushita #44; 5–2 | West Makushita #26; 5–2 | West Makushita #15; 0–0–7 |
| 2004 | West Makushita #55; 5–2 | East Makushita #34; 5–2 | East Makushita #22; 4–3 | East Makushita #17; 5–2 | East Makushita #10; 4–3 | West Makushita #6; 3–4 |
| 2005 | West Makushita #10; 4–3 | West Makushita #8; 2–5 | East Makushita #18; 4–3 | East Makushita #13; 3–4 | East Makushita #17; 4–3 | West Makushita #14; 4–3 |
| 2006 | East Makushita #9; 5–2 | West Makushita #3; 4–3 | West Makushita #1; 4–3 | West Jūryō #14; 9–6 | West Jūryō #8; 8–7 | West Jūryō #6; 7–8 |
| 2007 | East Jūryō #7; 8–7 | East Jūryō #3; 9–6 | East Maegashira #14; 10–5 | West Maegashira #8; 5–10 | East Maegashira #13; 3–12 | West Jūryō #5; 8–7 |
| 2008 | West Jūryō #2; 8–7 | West Maegashira #16; 5–10 | West Jūryō #5; 5–10 | West Jūryō #11; 8–7 | West Jūryō #9; 7–8 | West Jūryō #10; 4–11 |
| 2009 | East Makushita #4; 1–2–4 | East Makushita #26; 3–4 | East Makushita #35; 2–5 | East Makushita #51; 4–3 | East Makushita #43; 4–3 | West Makushita #35; 5–2 |
| 2010 | West Makushita #24; 2–5 | West Makushita #38; 6–1 | East Makushita #14; 3–4 | West Makushita #25; 2–5 | West Makushita #40; 5–2 | East Makushita #26; 4–3 |
| 2011 | West Makushita #22; 3–4 | Tournament Cancelled; 0–0–0 | West Makushita #31; 4–3 | West Makushita #16; 2–5 | West Makushita #28; 4–3 | East Makushita #23; 4–3 |
| 2012 | West Makushita #18; 1–6 | West Makushita #40; 5–2 | West Makushita #30; 3–4 | East Makushita #37; 4–3 | West Makushita #30; 5–2 | West Makushita #18; 2–5 |
| 2013 | East Makushita #28; 3–4 | East Makushita #35; 2–5 | East Sandanme #2; 3–4 | East Sandanme #14; Retired; 2–5 | x | x |
Record given as wins–losses–absences Top division champion Top division runner-up Retired Lower divisions Non-participation Sanshō key: F=Fighting spirit; O=Outstanding performance; T=Technique Also shown: ★=Kinboshi; P=Playoff(s); Divisions: Makuuchi — Jūryō — Makushita — Sandanme — Jonidan — Jonokuchi Makuuchi ranks: Yokozuna — Ōzeki — Sekiwake — Komusubi — Maegashira

== See also ==
- Glossary of sumo terms
- List of past sumo wrestlers
- List of Mongolian sumo wrestlers
- List of non-Japanese sumo wrestlers
