= Kyokushūzan Noboru =

Mongolian sumo wrestler and politician

旭鷲山 昇 Kyokushūzan Noboru
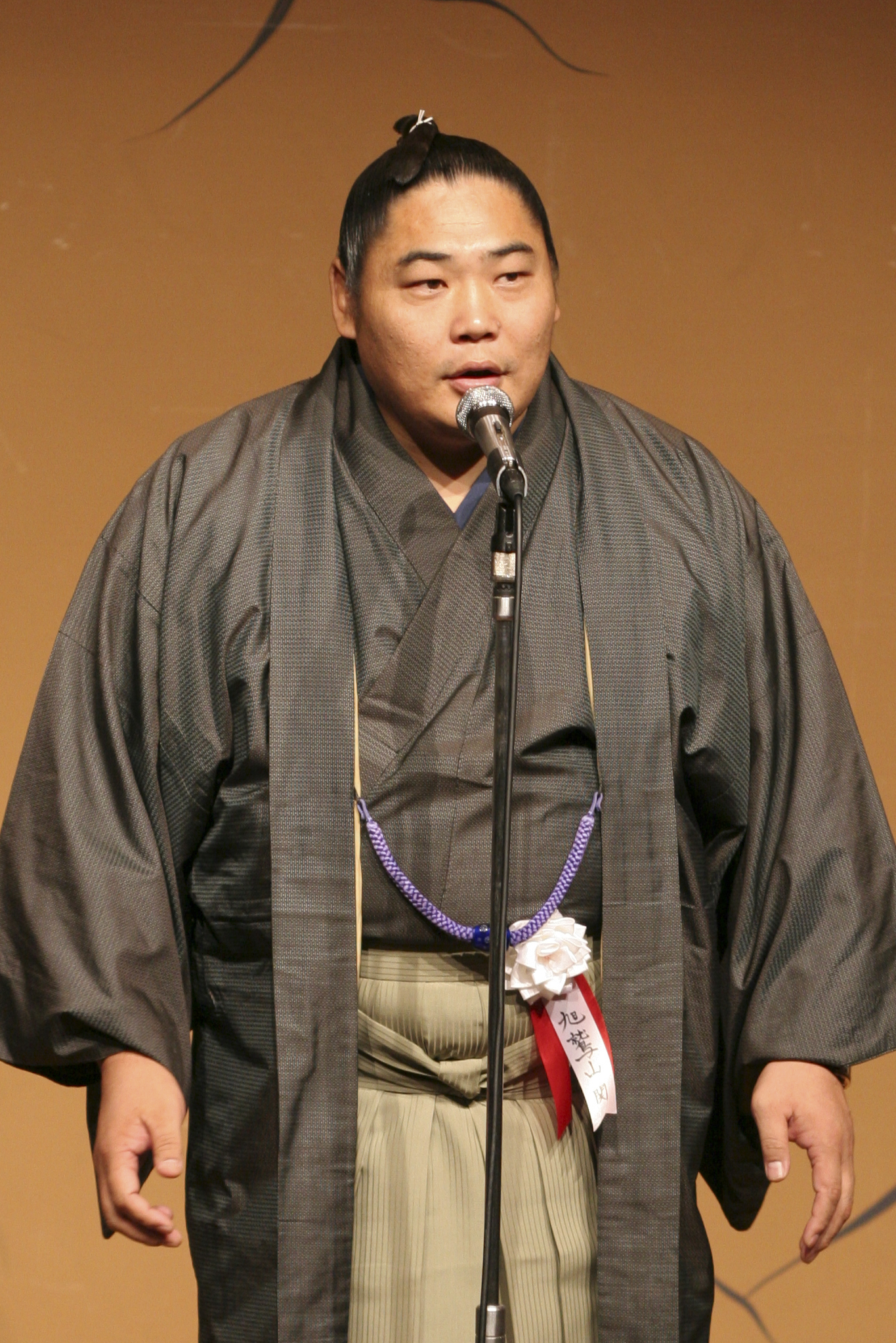
- Noboru in 2006

Personal information
- Born: Davaagiin Batbayar; March 8, 1973 (age 53) Ulaanbaatar, Mongolia
- Height: 1.80 m (5 ft 11 in)
- Weight: 141 kg (311 lb)

Sport
- Sport: Sumo
- Retired: November, 2006
- Heya: Ōshima
- Record: 560-600-2
- Debut: March, 1992
- Highest rank: Komusubi (March, 1997)
- Championships: 2 (Jūryō); 1 (Makushita)
- Special Prizes: Outstanding Performance (1); Fighting Spirit (2); Technique (2)
- Gold Stars: 5 Wakanohana III (2); Akebono; Asashōryū; Musashimaru
- Updated on July 2007

Kyokushūzan Noboru (旭鷲山 昇; (born March 8, 1973 as Davaagiin Batbayar) (Mongolian: Даваагийн Батбаяр) in Ulaanbaatar, Mongolia) is a former professional sumo wrestler and a politician of the Democratic Party in Mongolia. He was the first wrestler from Mongolia to reach sumo's top makuuchi division.

== Career ==
He was a practitioner of Mongolian wrestling from a young age, but had ambitions of becoming a policeman. However, in late 1991, a Japanese sumo training stable master, Ōshima-oyakata (the former ōzeki Asahikuni) went to Mongolia to recruit promising wrestlers for sumo. The young Davaagiin Batbayar happened to notice the advertisement and applied along with 120 others. He was selected and went to Japan with five others, including Kyokutenhō and Kyokutenzan. They were the first Mongolians ever to join sumo. He was immediately given the shikona of Kyokushūzan, meaning "eagle mountain of the rising sun." He made his professional debut in March 1992. However six months later, due to cultural differences, language problems, and an extremely hard training regime, five of them including Kyokushūzan ran away from the training stable to the Mongolian embassy. He was eventually persuaded to return by his stablemaster's wife, and also Kyokutenzan.

In March 1995, he was promoted to the jūryō division, and in September 1996 to the top makuuchi division. After his single appearance as a komusubi in March 1997 he was ranked as a maegashira for 58 tournaments in a row, a record in the sumo world. He was a runner-up in two tournaments in March 2003 and September 2004, and was awarded five special prizes for his achievements in tournaments – two for Technique, two for Fighting Spirit and one for Outstanding Performance. He also earned five kinboshi or gold stars for defeating yokozuna, the last coming in May 2003 against fellow Mongolian Asashōryū. Determined to get revenge in the next tournament in July, Asashōryū pulled on Kyokushūzan's topknot; a foul for which he was disqualified (hansoku), the first time this had ever happened to a yokozuna (Kyokushūzan did not get a kinboshi on that occasion as they are not given for wins by hansoku).

== Fighting style ==
At the beginning of his top division career he gained great popularity with audiences due to his variety of techniques, which were influenced by Mongolian wrestling. Less often seen in sumo, they surprised many of his early opponents. He was known as the gino depato, or "department store of techniques." In the May 2002 tournament, he won his first eight bouts in a row, using eight different techniques. However, because he was in danger of injuring other wrestlers, he was eventually told by the Sumo Association to stop using some of them, and by the end of his career he had a much more defensive (and less successful) style. His most common winning kimarite overall were uwatenage (overarm throw) and yorikiri (force out), using his preferred mawashi grip of migi-yotsu (left hand outside, right hand inside). However his next most common were hatakikomi (slap down) and hikiotoshi (pull down), reflecting his change of style.

== Retirement from sumo ==
In November 2006, he suddenly announced his retirement two days into the Kyushu tournament. At the time this was thought to be because of a heart problem. A ceremony in his honour was held in Ulaanbaatar at the end of 2006, attended by then Mongolian Prime Minister. Kyokushūzan's danpatsu-shiki, the official retirement ceremony where the retired rikishi's topknot is cut off, was reportedly going to be held in Mongolia, but eventually took place at the Ryōgoku Kokugikan in Tokyo on June 2, 2007. Soon after the ceremony, on June 4, 2007, Kyokushūzan released a memorial photobook.

It subsequently emerged that Kyokushūzan was the victim of an attempted extortion by gangsters, linked to the Sumiyoshi-kai crime syndicate. The gangsters were all arrested, and Kyokushūzan told police that this incident was one reason for his retirement.

He moved into Mongolian politics and in June 2008 was elected to the Mongolian parliament on the opposition Democratic Party ticket. In the 2012 Parliamentary elections, he ran in his native Khovd Province but was not elected. He worked as an advisor on Japan to the Prime Minister of Mongolia Chimediin Saikhanbileg from 2013. He ran for the Democratic Party again in the 2020 Parliamentary elections but was once more unsuccessful.

During his active career and since his retirement Kyokushūzan has been an active recruiter of Mongolian sumo wrestlers to enter professional sumo, using his connections to help fellow Mongolians interested in joining sumo to find a stable looking to recruit a foreign wrestler. In this regard, he was instrumental in starting the careers of younger sumo wrestlers such as Hakuhō, Tamawashi and Mōkonami. He estimates he has recruited around 25 Mongolians for professional sumo over the years. After returning to Mongolia he established the "Kyokushu Beya Sports Center", including the country's first sumo training school, and served as president of the Mongolian Sumo Federation.

He has since transitioned to a career in business, owning the 15-story "Kyokushu Tower", engaging in trade and car dealership, investing in housing. With his help, his mother became the owner of a supermarket employing 50 people.

== Personal life ==
In May 2000, Kyokushūzan married a Mongolian woman who was studying in Japan. The couple had a son and a daughter. Following his retirement from his professional career, Batbayar relocated back to Mongolia. He entered into his second marriage with T. Bayasgalan, a renowned Mongolian country singer, and they have since welcomed a son and a daughter into their family. They announced their divorce in 2023.

== Career record ==
Kyokushūzan Noboru
Year	January Hatsu basho, Tokyo	March Haru basho, Osaka	May Natsu basho, Tokyo	July Nagoya basho, Nagoya	September Aki basho, Tokyo	November Kyūshū basho, Fukuoka
1992	x	(Maezumo)	West Jonokuchi #25; 6–1	East Jonidan #85; 5–2	West Jonidan #46; 4–3	East Jonidan #15; 6–1
1993	East Sandanme #58; 5–2	West Sandanme #27; 3–4	West Sandanme #41; 5–2	East Sandanme #10; 5–2	West Makushita #50; 5–2	East Makushita #31; 4–3
1994	East Makushita #23; 4–3	West Makushita #17; 5–2	West Makushita #8; 3–4	West Makushita #14; 5–2	East Makushita #9; 3–4	East Makushita #16; 5–2
1995	East Makushita #9; 7–0; Champion	West Jūryō #11; 6–9	East Makushita #2; 5–2	East Jūryō #13; 10–5; Champion	West Jūryō #6; 8–7	West Jūryō #5; 6–9
1996	West Jūryō #9; 8–7	West Jūryō #8; 11–4–P; Champion	East Jūryō #4; 9–6	East Jūryō #1; 9–6	East Maegashira #15; 9–6	West Maegashira #7; 8–7
1997	West Maegashira #3; 9–6; T	West Komusubi #1; 4–11	West Maegashira #4; 2–13 ★	West Maegashira #11; 9–6	West Maegashira #3; 3–12	West Maegashira #8; 9–6
1998	East Maegashira #4; 5–10	East Maegashira #7; 4–11	West Maegashira #13; 9–6	West Maegashira #11; 9–6	East Maegashira #5; 4–11	East Maegashira #12; 8–7
1999	West Maegashira #8; 9–6	East Maegashira #3; 7–8 ★	East Maegashira #4; 5–10	East Maegashira #7; 9–6	East Maegashira #2; 7–8	East Maegashira #3; 5–10
2000	East Maegashira #6; 8–7	West Maegashira #1; 5–10 ★	East Maegashira #4; 5–10	East Maegashira #8; 5–10	East Maegashira #14; 9–6	East Maegashira #3; 4–11
2001	East Maegashira #10; 8–7	West Maegashira #5; 1–12–2	East Maegashira #15; 11–4	East Maegashira #5; 7–8	East Maegashira #6; 6–9	East Maegashira #9; 10–5
2002	East Maegashira #1; 6–9 ★	West Maegashira #3; 2–13	East Maegashira #10; 10–5; T	West Maegashira #2; 1–14	West Maegashira #11; 9–6	East Maegashira #5; 7–8
2003	West Maegashira #6; 7–8	West Maegashira #7; 10–5	East Maegashira #3; 8–7; O★	East Maegashira #2; 4–11	East Maegashira #8; 8–7	West Maegashira #5; 8–7
2004	West Maegashira #2; 8–7	West Maegashira #1; 4–11	West Maegashira #7; 9–6	West Maegashira #3; 3–12	West Maegashira #10; 11–4	West Maegashira #4; 2–13
2005	West Maegashira #10; 9–6	East Maegashira #6; 5–10	West Maegashira #9; 12–3; F	West Maegashira #1; 5–10	West Maegashira #4; 4–11	East Maegashira #10; 7–8
2006	West Maegashira #11; 7–8	East Maegashira #13; 11–4; F	East Maegashira #5; 9–6	West Maegashira #1; 3–12	East Maegashira #8; 6–9	East Maegashira #10; Retired; 0–2
Record given as wins–losses–absences Top division champion Top division runner-up Retired Lower divisions Non-participation Sanshō key: F=Fighting spirit; O=Outstanding performance; T=Technique Also shown: ★=Kinboshi; P=Playoff(s); Divisions: Makuuchi — Jūryō — Makushita — Sandanme — Jonidan — Jonokuchi Makuuchi ranks: Yokozuna — Ōzeki — Sekiwake — Komusubi — Maegashira

== See also ==
- Glossary of sumo terms
- List of past sumo wrestlers
- List of Mongolian sumo wrestlers
- List of non-Japanese sumo wrestlers
- List of sumo top division runners-up
- List of sumo second division champions
- List of komusubi
