= Mōkonami Sakae =

Mongolian sumo wrestler

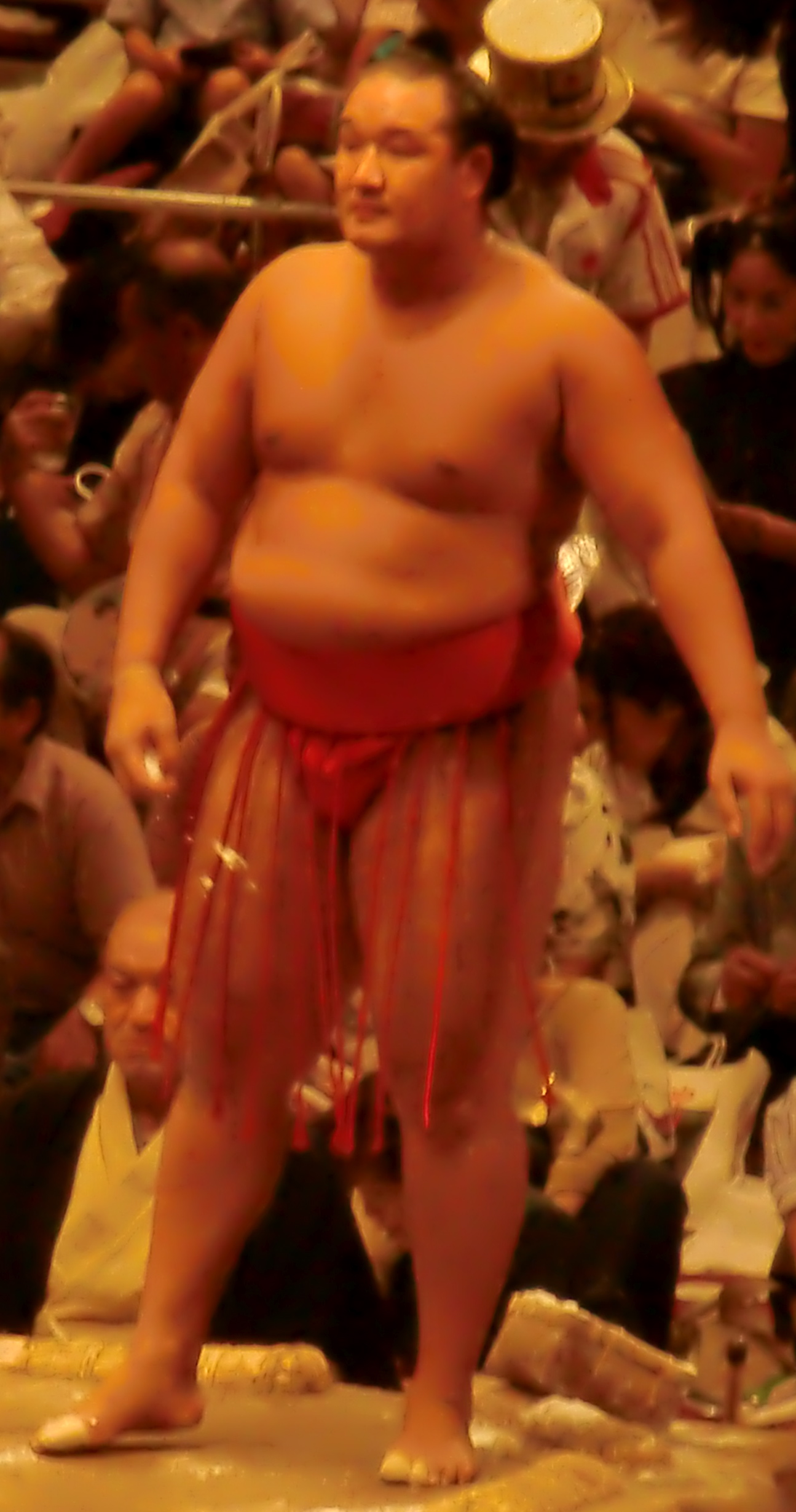

Personal information
- Native name: 猛虎浪 栄
- Born: Ganbold Bazarsad; April 5, 1984 (age 42) Ulaanbaatar, Mongolian People's Republic
- Height: 1.88 m (6 ft 2 in)
- Weight: 148 kg (326 lb; 23.3 st)

Sport
- Sport: Sumo
- Retired: April, 2011
- Heya: Tatsunami
- Record: 341-304
- Debut: March, 2001
- Highest rank: Maegashira 6 (September 2010)

Mōkonami Sakae (born 5 April 1984 as Ganbold Bazarsad) is a former sumo wrestler from Mongolia. After making his professional sumo debut in March 2001, he had his top makuuchi division debut 8 years later in July 2009. His highest rank was maegashira 6. He has acquired Japanese citizenship. In April 2011 he was ordered to retire by the Japan Sumo Association after an investigation found him guilty of match-fixing.

== Early life and sumo background ==
Ganbold Bazarsad was born and raised in Ulaanbaatar, at the time located in the Mongolian People's Republic. It has been reported that he lived in the same apartment complex as later makuuchi contemporary Shōtenrō, though they never met in person. During his school years, he was focused on basketball and only participated in Mongolian wrestling occasionally as recreation. But after seeing the well-known Mongolian sumo wrestler Kyokutenhō in action, he was inspired to try out sumo. He came to Japan in 2000 with an invitation to try out for Tatsunami stable through a connection with Kyokutenhō's contemporary Kyokushūzan, and entered sumo in March, 2001, the same tournament as the later Mongolian yokozuna Hakuhō.

== Career ==
The ring name he took combined "Mōko" (猛虎, "fierce tiger", which is homophonous with the old Sino-Japanese name for Mongolia, 蒙古) with the "nami" of Tatsunami stable. There is a now a movement among Mongolians residing in Japan to discontinue using the country name Mōko as they consider the name derogatory. This was acknowledged by Mōkonami, but he continued using this shikona for the remainder of his career.

Mōkonami had trouble gaining weight at first and struggled in the ranks of the sandanme fourth division. As his weight finally began to rise, however, his sumo improved, and he was promoted to the third division, makushita in January 2005. He proceeded to win a majority of bouts in five consecutive tournaments, and with a 5–2 record in his last makushita tournament, he finally became a sekitori by gaining promotion to jūryō in January 2006. Being a fan of the Hanshin Tigers, and recognizing that his coach is an old friend of the well-known Tiger player Katsuhito Yamada (as well as the fact that the second Chinese character in his ring name is "tiger") Mōkonami commemorated his jūryō debut with a new keshō-mawashi, approved by the Tigers' owners, that closely resembled the Tigers' logo.

Mōkonami proceeded to get a majority of wins in his first three tournaments after his jūryō debut. His performance in the March 2006 tournament would have granted him entry into the top division in the following May tournament had not Jūmonji, the maegashira #9 wrestler, narrowly managed to avoid relegation to jūryō by achieving a fourth win on the last day of the tournament. Perhaps succumbing to the pressure, Mōkonami only managed a 5–10 record at the jūryō top slot that he had earned for the May tournament. His fall continued, as he chalked up losing tournaments in for the remainder of 2006. He dropped back to makushita in 2007. Though he managed a 5–2 record in the January tournament at makushita #4, the successful records of a number of other wrestlers near his rank kept him from jūryō promotion in the following tournament. His 4-3 performance in the March tournament of 2007 was enough to grant him entry into jūryō again. After bouncing between winning and losing tournaments through the rest of 2007 and most of 2008 he managed to find some traction, and in four consecutive tournaments from November 2008 tournament to May 2009, he won a majority of his bouts. His May 2009 rank, again at the top spot of jūryō was almost a mirror image of his previous performance at this rank, as he pulled off a dominating 11–4 win which would catapult him into his top makuuchi division debut at the comparatively high rank of maegashira #7.

Possibly challenged by debuting at such a high rank, Mōkonami's first two tournaments in the top division were losing performances. However, in the November 2009 tournament, he finally achieved a positive record of 9–6 at the 13th maegashira slot, staving off any fears of demotion from makuuchi. After clinching his kachi-koshi on the final day of the July 2010 tournament, he reached a new highest rank of maegashira 6 in September. He scored only five wins there, but managed a majority of wins in what was to be his final tournament in January 2011.

== Retirement from sumo ==
After an investigation by the Sumo Association into allegations of bout-rigging prompted by the discovery of text-messages on a mobile phone belonging to former maegashira Kasuganishiki, Mōkonami was one of 23 wrestlers and coaches found guilty of involvement. He was ordered to retire, and submitted his letter of resignation on April 4, 2011.

== Fighting style ==
Mōkonami's favourite techniques as listed by the Sumo Association were hidari-yotsu (a right hand outside, left hand inside grip on the opponent's mawashi), yori (force out) and tsuppari (a series of rapid thrusts to the chest). After yori-kiri, his next most frequently used kimarite were uwatenage (overarm throw) and oshi-dashi (push out).

== Personal life ==
On December 21, 2009, it was announced that Mōkonami had been granted Japanese citizenship. This allowed his stable to take on another Mongolian wrestler, Ryūonami, bypassing the Japan Sumo Association's limit of one foreign wrestler per stable, although this loophole has since been closed. Mōkonami's legal name is now Sakae Ishikawa.

Mōkonami is married, with a daughter born in 2006.

== Career record ==
Mōkonami Sakae
Year	January Hatsu basho, Tokyo	March Haru basho, Osaka	May Natsu basho, Tokyo	July Nagoya basho, Nagoya	September Aki basho, Tokyo	November Kyūshū basho, Fukuoka
2001	x	(Maezumo)	West Jonokuchi #23; 5–2	East Jonidan #93; 5–2	East Jonidan #51; 5–2	West Jonidan #10; 4–3
2002	East Sandanme #93; 3–4	East Jonidan #9; 5–2	East Sandanme #72; 5–2	West Sandanme #41; 1–6	West Sandanme #76; 5–2	West Sandanme #47; 3–4
2003	East Sandanme #65; 3–4	East Sandanme #82; 2–5	East Jonidan #12; 6–1	East Sandanme #50; 4–3	East Sandanme #37; 3–4	East Sandanme #52; 4–3
2004	West Sandanme #33; 5–2	East Sandanme #8; 4–3	East Makushita #56; 4–3	East Makushita #47; 4–3	West Makushita #39; 4–3	East Makushita #35; 3–4
2005	East Makushita #43; 4–3	East Makushita #35; 4–3	East Makushita #30; 5–2	West Makushita #19; 6–1	West Makushita #8; 6–1	East Makushita #2; 5–2
2006	West Jūryō #10; 11–4	West Jūryō #3; 9–6	East Jūryō #1; 5–10	West Jūryō #5; 4–11	West Jūryō #12; 7–8	East Jūryō #14; 5–10
2007	West Makushita #4; 5–2	East Makushita #1; 4–3	West Jūryō #13; 8–7	East Jūryō #10; 8–7	East Jūryō #7; 6–9	East Jūryō #10; 9–6
2008	East Jūryō #7; 9–6	West Jūryō #5; 7–8	West Jūryō #6; 5–10	East Jūryō #12; 9–6	West Jūryō #7; 5–10	West Jūryō #13; 8–7
2009	West Jūryō #12; 9–6	East Jūryō #6; 9–6	West Jūryō #1; 11–4	West Maegashira #7; 6–9	East Maegashira #9; 5–10	West Maegashira #13; 9–6
2010	West Maegashira #11; 6–9	West Maegashira #15; 9–6	East Maegashira #11; 8–7	East Maegashira #10; 8–7	East Maegashira #6; 5–10	East Maegashira #11; 7–8
2011	West Maegashira #12; 8–7	Tournament Cancelled; 0–0–0	East Maegashira #12; Retired –	x	x	x
Record given as wins–losses–absences Top division champion Top division runner-up Retired Lower divisions Non-participation Sanshō key: F=Fighting spirit; O=Outstanding performance; T=Technique Also shown: ★=Kinboshi; P=Playoff(s); Divisions: Makuuchi — Jūryō — Makushita — Sandanme — Jonidan — Jonokuchi Makuuchi ranks: Yokozuna — Ōzeki — Sekiwake — Komusubi — Maegashira

== See also ==
- Glossary of sumo terms
- List of past sumo wrestlers
- List of Mongolian sumo wrestlers
- List of non-Japanese sumo wrestlers
