= Kyokutenzan Takeshi =

Mongolian sumo wrestler

Personal information
- Native name: 旭天山 武
- Born: Batmönkhiin Enkhbat; August 4, 1973 (age 53) Ulaanbaatar, Mongolia
- Height: 1.89 m (6 ft 2 1/2 in)
- Weight: 102 kg (225 lb)

Sport
- Sport: Sumo
- Retired: November, 2007
- Heya: Ōshima
- Record: 337-321-0
- Debut: March, 1992
- Highest rank: Makushita 13 (July, 2004)
- Updated on November 2007

Kyokutenzan Takeshi (born August 4, 1973 as Batmönkhiin Enkhbat, Mongolian: Батмөнхийн Энхбат) is a former professional sumo wrestler from Ulaanbaatar, Mongolia, one of the first Mongolians to join the sport in Japan. He did not manage to reach the top two divisions, but was regarded as a kind of mentor and father figure by younger Mongolian wrestlers who followed him, such as Hakuhō and Harumafuji. In 2005, he obtained Japanese citizenship, but he left sumo upon his retirement in November 2007, moving to Germany with his family to run a business.

== Career ==
Kyokutenzan joined sumo in March 1992 at the same time as his more famous Mongolian colleagues Kyokushūzan and Kyokutenhō, part of the first group of Mongolians ever to join the sport professionally, but unlike them he never reached sekitori status. This was due partly to an inability to put on weight, and partly to injuries. Nevertheless, he served as a tsukebito, or personal attendant, to Kyokutenhō, and was an importance influence on other Mongolian rikishi. During his early days in sumo, when five of the six Mongolians in Ōshima stable ran away due to homesickness and the hardship of training, and sought refuge in the Mongolian embassy, Kyokutenzan was the only one who remained and he persuaded his countrymen to return. The importance of this action was recognized by Futagoyama Oyakata, the former ōzeki and father of Takanohana and Wakanohana, who commented that otherwise the subsequent line of successful Mongolian wrestlers in sumo might never have emerged.

During the January 2007 tournament Kyokutenzan attracted criticism over the amount of time he was spending in the two dressing rooms in which the wrestlers prepare for their bouts. He was interviewed by the Japan Sumo Association as part of their investigation of alleged match-fixing involving yokozuna Asashōryū. Kyokutenzan responded by saying he was just giving advice to Mongolian junior wrestlers, declaring, "I have never known of any match-fixing."

Kyokutenzan retired from professional sumo at the end of the 2007 Kyushu tournament. His retirement ceremony was held in December with Hakuhō and Asashōryū amongst the attendees as well as Kyokushūzan and Kyokutenhō. Kyuokutenzan moved to Germany with his wife, who he had married in July 2007, to start a business. His second child, a girl, was born in May 2008.

== Career record ==
Kyokutenzan Takeshi
Year	January Hatsu basho, Tokyo	March Haru basho, Osaka	May Natsu basho, Tokyo	July Nagoya basho, Nagoya	September Aki basho, Tokyo	November Kyūshū basho, Fukuoka
1992	x	(Maezumo)	West Jonokuchi #46; 6–1	East Jonidan #98; 3–4	East Jonidan #121; 5–2	East Jonidan #79; 4–3
1993	East Jonidan #46; 4–3	West Jonidan #23; 4–3	East Jonidan #1; 1–6	West Jonidan #38; 5–2	West Jonidan #1; 3–4	West Jonidan #19; 4–3
1994	West Jonidan #4; 4–3	West Sandanme #85; 3–4	East Jonidan #2; 2–5	East Jonidan #31; 6–1	East Sandanme #72; 3–4	East Sandanme #89; 3–4
1995	East Jonidan #4; 5–2	East Sandanme #68; 5–2	West Sandanme #32; 3–4	West Sandanme #44; 3–4	East Sandanme #63; 4–3	West Sandanme #42; 5–2
1996	West Sandanme #10; 4–3	East Makushita #59; 3–4	East Sandanme #20; 4–3	West Sandanme #6; 3–4	East Sandanme #21; 3–4	West Sandanme #35; 4–3
1997	West Sandanme #20; 2–5	East Sandanme #44; 6–1	West Makushita #58; 5–2	West Makushita #37; 2–5	East Sandanme #4; 2–5	West Sandanme #31; 4–3
1998	East Sandanme #18; 2–5	West Sandanme #44; 4–3	West Sandanme #30; 4–3	East Sandanme #17; 4–3	East Sandanme #6; 4–3	West Makushita #56; 5–2
1999	West Makushita #35; 3–4	East Makushita #46; 3–4	East Sandanme #2; 5–2	West Makushita #45; 1–6	West Sandanme #7; 4–3	East Makushita #59; 2–5
2000	East Sandanme #23; 5–2	East Makushita #58; 4–3	East Makushita #51; 4–3	East Makushita #42; 4–3	East Makushita #33; 1–6	West Makushita #51; 5–2
2001	West Makushita #32; 4–3	East Makushita #26; 5–2	West Makushita #17; 1–6	East Makushita #40; 3–4	East Makushita #53; 5–2	West Makushita #34; 5–2
2002	East Makushita #18; 4–3	East Makushita #16; 3–4	West Makushita #26; 4–3	East Makushita #19; 2–5	West Makushita #37; 4–3	West Makushita #27; 1–6
2003	East Makushita #55; 3–4	West Sandanme #10; 4–3	West Makushita #58; 4–3	West Makushita #50; 5–2	East Makushita #31; 3–4	West Makushita #41; 4–3
2004	West Makushita #29; 1–6	West Makushita #55; 6–1	West Makushita #25; 5–2	East Makushita #13; 2–5	East Makushita #28; 3–4	East Makushita #36; 3–4
2005	West Makushita #44; 3–4	West Makushita #56; 4–3	East Makushita #48; 1–6	West Sandanme #18; 5–2	East Makushita #58; 4–3	East Makushita #49; 3–4
2006	West Sandanme #2; 4–3	East Makushita #52; 3–4	West Sandanme #5; 4–3	East Makushita #55; 4–3	West Makushita #47; 3–4	West Makushita #56; 4–3
2007	West Makushita #46; 2–5	West Sandanme #8; 4–3	West Makushita #57; 5–2	East Makushita #45; 4–3	West Makushita #37; 4–3	West Makushita #29; 1–6
2008	West Makushita #52; Retired; 0–0–7	x	x	x	x	x
Record given as wins–losses–absences Top division champion Top division runner-up Retired Lower divisions Non-participation Sanshō key: F=Fighting spirit; O=Outstanding performance; T=Technique Also shown: ★=Kinboshi; P=Playoff(s); Divisions: Makuuchi — Jūryō — Makushita — Sandanme — Jonidan — Jonokuchi Makuuchi ranks: Yokozuna — Ōzeki — Sekiwake — Komusubi — Maegashira

== See also ==
- Glossary of sumo terms
- List of past sumo wrestlers
- List of Mongolian sumo wrestlers
- List of non-Japanese sumo wrestlers
