= List of Mongolian sumo wrestlers =

This following is a list of notable Mongolian sumo wrestlers.

Contents: A B C Ç D E F G H I İ J K L M N O Ö P R S Ş T U Ü V Y Z

== A ==
- Arawashi Tsuyoshi
- Asahakuryū Tarō
- Asahifuji Hideki
- Asasekiryū Tarō
- Asashōryū Akinori
- Azumaryū Tsuyoshi

== B ==
- Ulambayaryn Byambajav

== C ==
- Chiyoshōma Fujio

== D ==
- Daiseizan Daisuke
- Daishōhō Kiyohiro
- Dewanoryū Kazuki

== H ==
- Hakuba Takeshi
- Hakuhō Shō
- Harumafuji Kōhei
- Hokuseihō Osamu
- Hōshōryū Tomokatsu

== I ==
- Ichinojō Takashi

== K ==
- Kagamiō Hideoki
- Kakuryū Rikisaburō
- Kirishima Tetsuo
- Kōryū Tadaharu
- Kyokukaiyū Ren
- Kyokushūhō Kōki
- Kyokushūzan Noboru
- Kyokutenhō Masaru
- Kyokutenzan Takeshi

== M ==
- Mitoryū Takayuki
- Mōkonami Sakae

== R ==
- Rōga Tokiyoshi
- Ryūō Noboru

== O ==
- Ōnokatsu Kazuhiro
- Ōshōma Degi

== S ==
- Seirō Takeshi
- Shōtenrō Taishi
- Sōkokurai Eikichi

== T ==
- Takanoiwa Yoshimori
- Tamashōhō Manpei
- Tamawashi Ichirō
- Tenshoyama Shōgo
- Terunofuji Haruo
- Tokitenkū Yoshiaki
- Tokusegawa Masanao
- Toshinofuji Taisei
