= Bushūyama Takashi =

Sumo wrestler

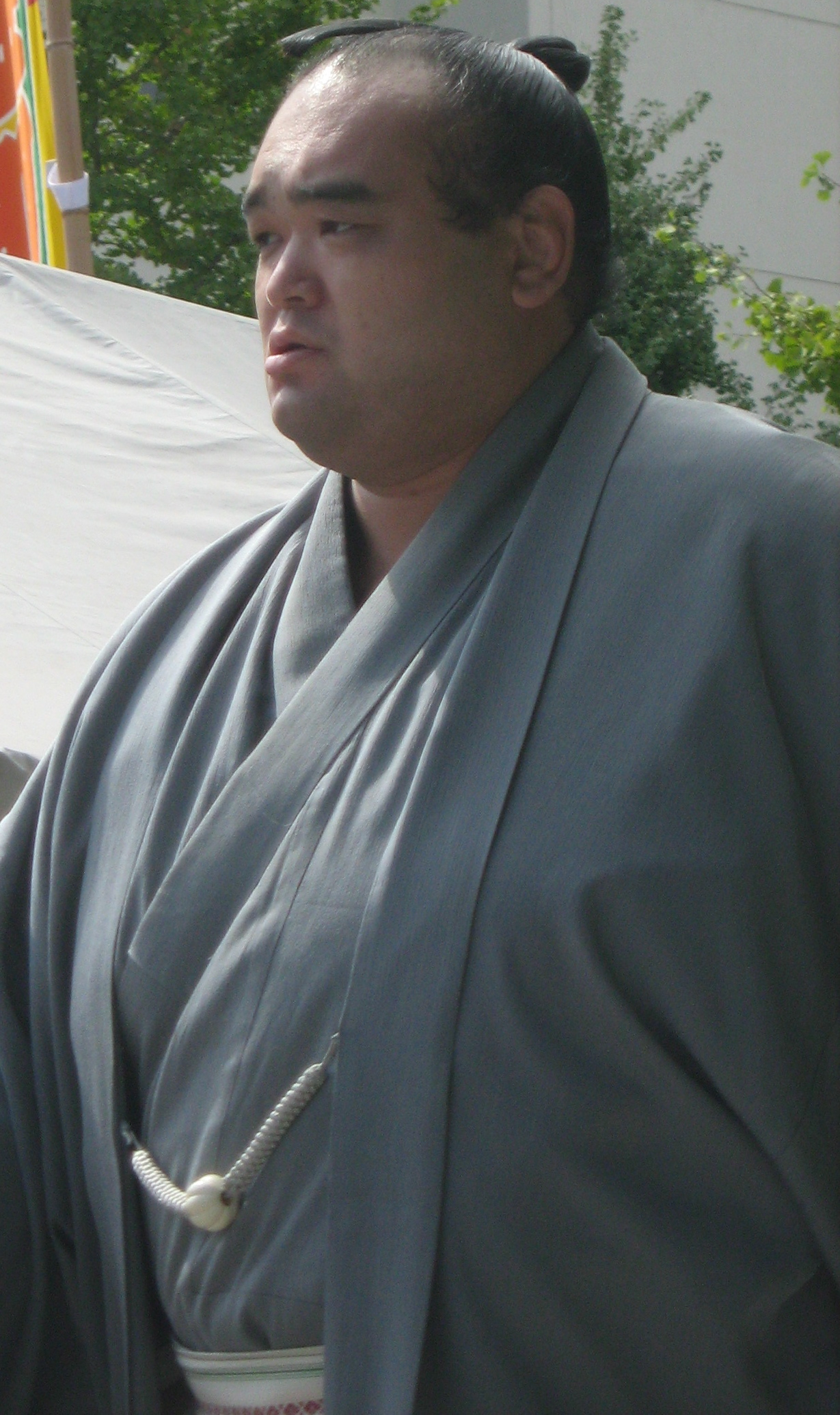

Personal information
- Native name: 武州山 隆士
- Born: Takashi Yamauchi; May 21, 1976 (age 50) Aomori, Aomori Prefecture
- Height: 1.90 m (6 ft 3 in)
- Weight: 170 kg (370 lb; 27 st)

Sport
- Sport: Sumo
- Retired: January 2013
- Heya: Fujishima
- Record: 416–427–25
- Debut: January, 1999
- Highest rank: Maegashira 3 (November, 2009)
- Elder name: Matsuchiyama
- Championships: 2 (Jūryō)
- Updated on 16 March 2022

Bushūyama Takashi (武州山 隆士; born May 21, 1976) is a Japanese former sumo wrestler from Aomori, Aomori Prefecture. He made his professional debut in January 1999. At the age of 32, he was promoted to the top makuuchi division in the November 2008 tournament. His highest rank was maegashira 3. He is now a sumo coach.

== Career ==
Bushuyama was a contemporary of Wakanosato and Takamisakari, both also from Aomori. He was a member of the sumo club at Daito Bunka University, and reached the round of 16 in the 1998 All Japan Sumo Championship. As his club did not have many members, they regularly trained at Musashigawa stable, and this was the heya he joined upon entering the professional ranks. He made his debut in the same tournament as Asashōryū. He was given special dispensation to begin his career in the third highest makushita division because of his achievements in amateur sumo, but in 2001 fell to the jonidan division because of an elbow injury. He reached the second highest jūryō division in September 2003, the first member of his university to attain sekitori status.

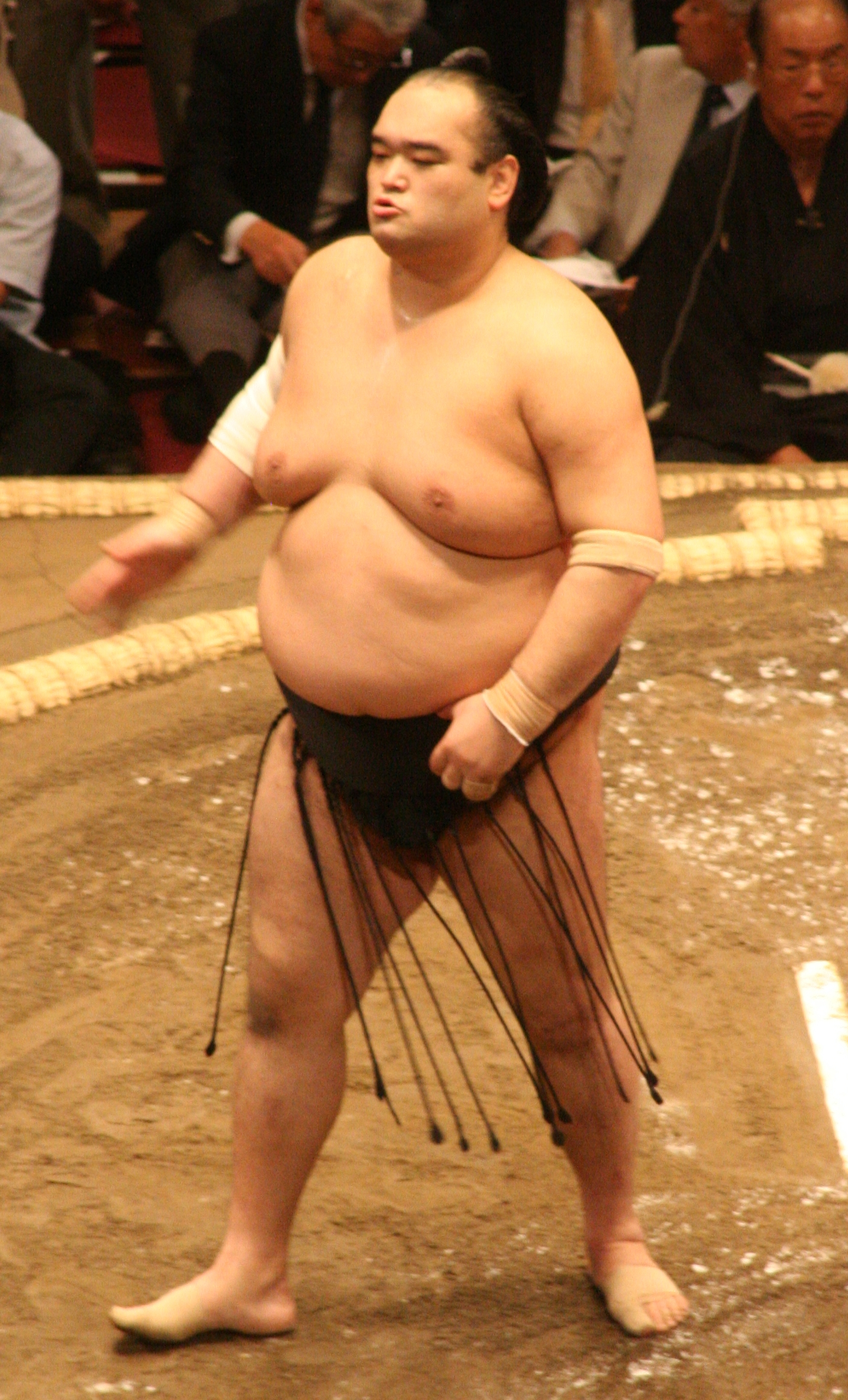
Bushuyama in May 2009

In 2005 he fell back to makushita, and did not return to jūryō until January 2007. He won the jūryō division championship for the first time in July 2008, with a 12–3 record. He followed up with a 10–5 score in September. In November 2008, he was finally promoted to the top division. It had taken him 59 tournaments to win promotion to the top division from his debut, which at the time was the longest of any former collegiate champion (this dubious honor is now held by Tsurugidake). At 32 years and five months he was also the fourth oldest wrestler to make his top division debut since the end of World War II.

Bushuyama scored eight wins in his top division debut and was promoted to maegashira 6 for the January 2009 tournament. However, a very disappointing 2–13 record there meant he was demoted back to the jūryō division for the March 2009 tournament. He scored 8–7 there, enough for an immediate top division return. He recovered from 1–5 down in May to score 9–6 at maegashira 15. In the September tournament he produced his best top division score of 10–5, narrowly failing to win a special prize after being beaten on the final day. He was promoted to his highest rank of maegashira 3 for November 2009. He defeated ozeki Kotomitsuki in this tournament, but recorded a make-koshi score of 6–9. In January 2010 he produced a poor 2–13 record, the same score from the same rank as the previous Hatsu basho in 2009. However, on this occasion he remained in the top division for the following tournament, albeit at the very lowest rank of Maegashira 16 West. He lost his top division status after scoring only 4–11 in March, but won his second jūryō championship with an 11–4 record in May and secured an immediate return to makuuchi. He was demoted to juryo again after the November 2010 tournament, and lost sekitori status altogether after the May 2012 tournament, never to regain it.

== Retirement from sumo ==
Bushuyama announced his retirement after the January 2013 basho. He became an elder of the Japan Sumo Association under the name Onogawa Oyakata. His danpatsu-shiki or official retirement ceremony was held in the Ryogoku Kokugikan October 2013, with around 300 guests and his stablemaster, former yokozuna Mienoumi, making the final cut of his topknot. He works as a coach at his old stable, now renamed Fujishima stable. In January 2016 he switched to the Kiyomigata elder name (owned by active wrestler Tochiozan.) In May 2020 he switched to the Kasugayama kabu (owned by Ikioi). In May 2021 he acquired the Matsuchiyama name following the retirement of the former Banryūyama.

== Fighting style ==
Bushuyama favoured yotsu-sumo or a grappling style, preferring a hidari-yotsu or right hand outside, left hand inside grip on his opponents mawashi. His most common winning technique was yori-kiri (force-out) followed by oshi dashi (push out) and yori-taoshi (force out and down).

== Career record ==
Bushūyama Takashi
Year	January Hatsu basho, Tokyo	March Haru basho, Osaka	May Natsu basho, Tokyo	July Nagoya basho, Nagoya	September Aki basho, Tokyo	November Kyūshū basho, Fukuoka
1999	Makushita tsukedashi #60; 5–2	East Makushita #42; 3–4	East Makushita #54; 5–2	West Makushita #35; 4–3	East Makushita #26; 3–4	East Makushita #32; 2–5
2000	East Makushita #43; 3–4	East Makushita #53; 6–1	West Makushita #25; 2–1–4	West Makushita #41; Sat out due to injury 0–0–7	West Makushita #41; 3–4	West Makushita #47; 2–5
2001	East Sandanme #7; Sat out due to injury 0–0–7	East Sandanme #67; Sat out due to injury 0–0–7	East Jonidan #28; 6–1	West Sandanme #64; 5–2	East Sandanme #36; 6–1	West Makushita #51; 3–4
2002	East Sandanme #6; 3–4	East Sandanme #21; 6–1	West Makushita #41; 5–2	West Makushita #23; 3–4	West Makushita #33; 3–4	East Makushita #42; 3–4
2003	West Makushita #55; 6–1–P	West Makushita #25; 4–3	West Makushita #19; 5–2	West Makushita #9; 6–1	East Makushita #2; 4–3	East Jūryō #12; 7–8
2004	West Jūryō #11; 7–8	West Jūryō #12; 9–6	East Jūryō #9; 6–9	East Jūryō #11; 8–7	East Jūryō #7; 7–8	East Jūryō #8; 5–10
2005	East Jūryō #14; 4–11	East Makushita #6; 2–5	East Makushita #14; 4–3	East Makushita #10; 3–4	West Makushita #14; 3–4	East Makushita #20; 4–3
2006	East Makushita #14; 1–6	East Makushita #34; 5–2	East Makushita #22; 6–1	West Makushita #8; 4–3	East Makushita #7; 4–3	West Makushita #4; 5–2
2007	East Jūryō #13; 9–6	East Jūryō #10; 6–9	West Jūryō #12; 6–9	West Makushita #2; 2–5	West Makushita #12; 5–2	West Makushita #5; 4–3
2008	West Makushita #2; 4–3	East Makushita #1; 4–3	East Jūryō #14; 9–6	East Jūryō #8; 12–3; Champion	East Jūryō #1; 10–5	East Maegashira #10; 8–7
2009	East Maegashira #6; 2–13	East Jūryō #1; 8–7	West Maegashira #15; 9–6	East Maegashira #6; 5–10	West Maegashira #10; 10–5	West Maegashira #3; 6–9
2010	East Maegashira #6; 2–13	West Maegashira #16; 4–11	West Jūryō #5; 11–4; Champion	East Maegashira #15; 8–7	West Maegashira #9; 6–9	West Maegashira #12; 3–12
2011	East Jūryō #4; 8–7	Tournament Cancelled; 0–0–0	East Jūryō #2; 5–10	West Jūryō #2; 7–8	East Jūryō #4; 8–7	East Jūryō #2; 5–10
2012	East Jūryō #7; 7–8	East Jūryō #9; 8–7	East Jūryō #8; 3–12	West Makushita #3; 3–4	West Makushita #6; 3–4	East Makushita #11; 2–5
2013	East Makushita #23; Retired; 4–3	x	x	x	x	x
Record given as wins–losses–absences Top division champion Top division runner-up Retired Lower divisions Non-participation Sanshō key: F=Fighting spirit; O=Outstanding performance; T=Technique Also shown: ★=Kinboshi; P=Playoff(s); Divisions: Makuuchi — Jūryō — Makushita — Sandanme — Jonidan — Jonokuchi Makuuchi ranks: Yokozuna — Ōzeki — Sekiwake — Komusubi — Maegashira

== See also ==
- Glossary of sumo terms
- List of sumo tournament second division champions
- List of past sumo wrestlers
- List of sumo elders
