= Shōtenrō Taishi =

Sumo wrestler

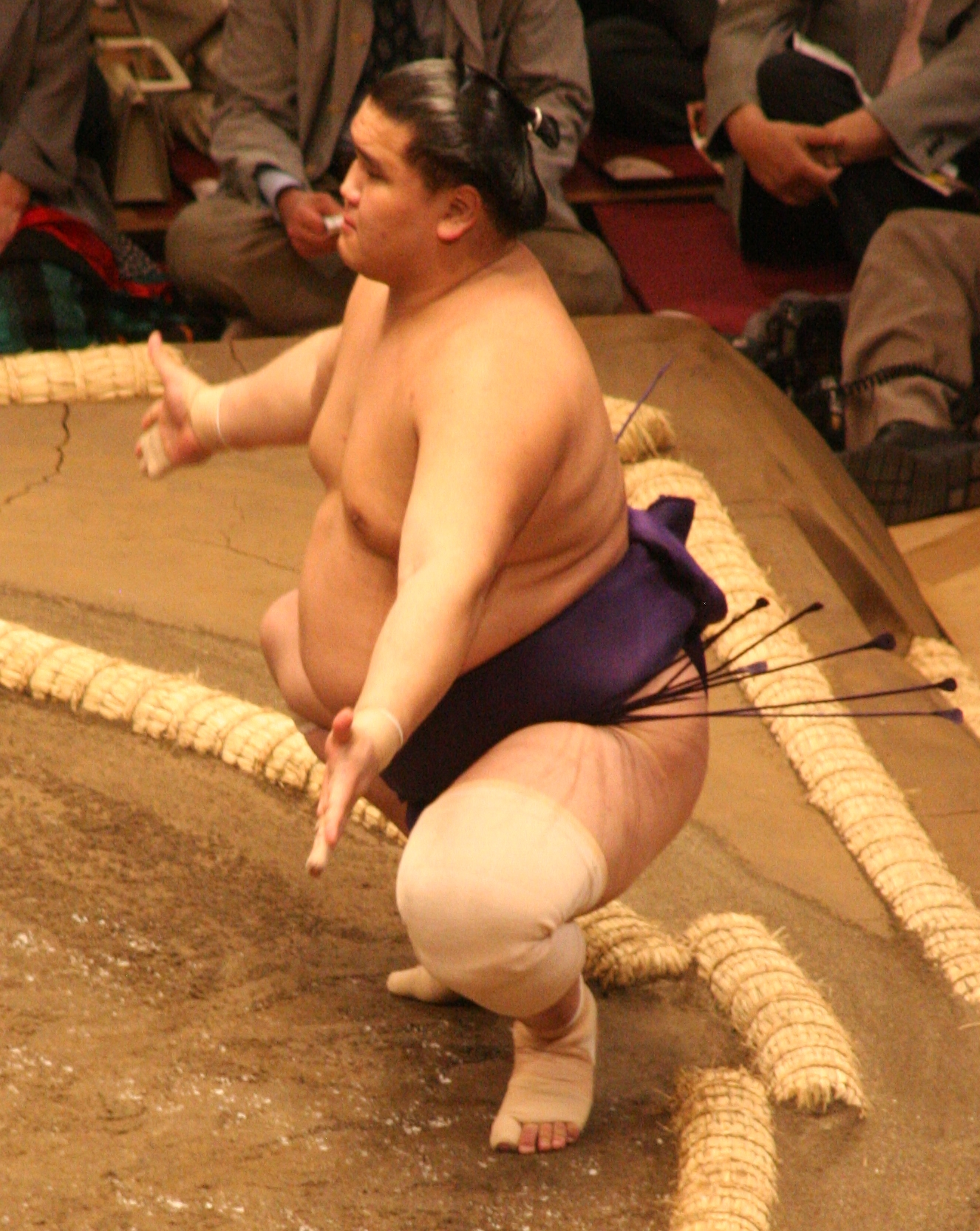

Personal information
- Native name: 翔天狼 大士
- Born: Nyamsuren Dagdandorj; January 31, 1982 (age 44) Mongolia
- Height: 1.89 m (6 ft 2 1/2 in)
- Weight: 166 kg (366 lb; 26.1 st)

Sport
- Sport: Sumo
- Retired: January, 2018
- Heya: Fujishima
- Record: 494-484-51
- Debut: March, 2001
- Highest rank: Maegashira 2 (September, 2009)
- Elder name: Izutsu
- Championships: 2 (Jūryō)
- Special Prizes: Fighting Spirit (1)
- Gold Stars: 1 (Hakuhō)
- Updated on Dec 28, 2017

Shōtenrō Taishi (born 31 January 1982 as Nyamsuren Dagdandorj) is a former sumo wrestler from Khovd Province, Mongolia. He joined professional sumo in 2001 and was known as Musashiryū Taishi until 2007. He made the top makuuchi division for the first time in 2009 and his highest rank was maegashira 2. He wrestled for Fujishima stable (formerly Musashigawa stable). He acquired Japanese citizenship in 2017 and retired shortly before the January 2018 tournament to become an elder of the Japan Sumo Association.

== Early life and sumo background ==
It has been reported that in his childhood in Ulan Bator he lived in the same apartment complex as future sumo contemporary Mōkonami, though they never met in person. As an amateur, Dagdandorj took third place in the open weight division in the Junior World Sumo Championships in 2000. He began his professional career in March 2001, at the same time as Hakuhō. He was given the shikona of Musashiryū, the prefix being a common one at Musashigawa stable.

== Career ==
His rise through the ranks was relatively smooth until he reached the third highest makushita division in January 2003, where an early injury put him out of action and dropped him back to the sandanme division. He continued to struggle with his own sumo and injuries in these two divisions for the next five years, changing his shikona to Shōtenrō in 2007 in a bid to improve his fortunes. When he finally found his stride again, his steady rise to the top division was a stark contrast to his previous struggles; he reached makuuchi after winning two consecutive jūryō division championships, only the third post-war wrestler after Kushimaumi and Miyabiyama to achieve this feat. All in all, it had taken him 48 tournaments from his professional debut to reach the top makuuchi division, the third slowest at the time amongst foreign born wrestlers. In July 2009 he was awarded the Fighting Spirit Prize for his record of eleven wins and four losses. In the September tournament he won his first kinboshi, becoming the first maegashira in a year to defeat Hakuhō, but could win only one other match. A 9–6 score in the following tournament in November seemed to steady him, but he suffered a surprising slump in January 2010 and a poor 3–12 record saw him demoted to jūryō. He returned to the top division for the July 2010 tournament, and after slipping back to jūryō in September won promotion again for November 2010.

In 2011 he was one of several wrestlers investigated by the Sumo Association after his name was mentioned in a text message about match-fixing. The text, dating from May 2010, was sent by low ranker Enatsukasa, an alleged go-between, to jūryō wrestler Chiyohakuho and said, "the match with Shotenro is for real", implying that bouts with other wrestlers were being fixed. Shōtenrō vehemently denied any involvement in bout-rigging, and in April 2011 was found not guilty by the investigative panel.

He missed the November 2011 tournament after undergoing surgery for appendicitis, dropping to the jūryō division in January. Despite only making a bare majority of eight wins at jūryō 5, this was enough for an immediate return to makuuchi. He had a superb start to the March tournament, winning nine of his first ten matches, but he faded in the home stretch, losing his last five bouts as he was matched against higher ranking opponents. He remained a middle ranking maegashira for several tournaments before finally being demoted to the second division for the March 2014 tournament. He was unable to return to makuuchi, and in September 2015 he lost his sekitori status and was demoted to the makushita division. A 4–3 record at the rank of Makushita #1 in January 2016 was enough to earn promotion back to jūryō for the March tournament in Osaka, but he pulled out of that tournament with only three wins and was demoted back to makushita. This was to be his last appearance in jūryō.

== Retirement from sumo ==
He acquired Japanese citizenship on August 18, 2017, and took the naturalized Japanese name of Matsudaira Shō. Japanese citizenship is a requirement for staying in the Japan Sumo Association as an elder, and with 25 tournaments fought in the top division he was eligible to coach after his retirement from active competition.

Shōtenrō sat out the July 2017 tournament, and was relegated to sandanme. It was disclosed on October 31 that he had been diagnosed with cancer during a health check-up prior to that tournament. At the meeting of the 70 sekitori held that day, all agreed to give Shōtenrō a cash donation as a mark of support. On December 28, 2017, Shōtenrō announced his retirement. He had spent 100 tournaments on the banzuke with a final career record of 494 wins against 484 losses, with a top division record of 164–196.

Shōtenrō has remained in sumo as a coach, originally under the elder name Kasugayama owned by Ikioi. In July 2019 he switched to the Kitajin elder name owned by Endō. In June 2022 he changed his elder name to Nishikijima; as the name became vacant in June of the previous year following the resignation of former ōzeki Asashio. In May 2025, he changed his elder name again, acquiring the name Dekiyama, changing it again in October 2026, taking on the name Izutsu.

== Fighting style ==
He was an oshi-sumo specialist, preferring pushing and thrusting techniques. He was however also capable of fighting on the mawashi or belt, where he preferred a migi-yotsu (left hand outside, right hand inside) grip. His most common winning move was oshi-dashi (push out), followed by yori-kiri (force out).

== Personal life ==
Shōtenrō married the sister of fellow Mongolian sekitori Kyokutenhō in 2011, and the reception was held in June 2012. As brothers-in-law, the two wrestlers could no longer meet in competition.

== Career record ==
Shōtenrō Taishi
Year	January Hatsu basho, Tokyo	March Haru basho, Osaka	May Natsu basho, Tokyo	July Nagoya basho, Nagoya	September Aki basho, Tokyo	November Kyūshū basho, Fukuoka
2001	x	(Maezumo)	East Jonokuchi #26; 6–1	East Jonidan #68; 5–2	East Jonidan #26; 5–2	West Sandanme #91; 4–3
2002	West Sandanme #72; 3–4	West Sandanme #89; 4–3	West Sandanme #70; 5–2	East Sandanme #39; 1–6	East Sandanme #74; 6–1	East Sandanme #18; 5–2
2003	East Makushita #53; 1–2–4	East Sandanme #25; 6–1	East Makushita #45; 3–4	West Makushita #54; 2–3–2	East Sandanme #16; 4–3	East Sandanme #4; 4–3
2004	West Makushita #49; 5–2	East Makushita #29; 4–3	East Makushita #24; 0–7	East Sandanme #1; 4–3	East Makushita #51; 6–1	East Makushita #22; 5–2
2005	East Makushita #12; 4–3	West Makushita #10; 3–4	East Makushita #16; 4–3	West Makushita #11; 4–3	West Makushita #9; 2–5	West Makushita #20; 5–2
2006	West Makushita #10; 1–2–4	West Makushita #28; Sat out due to injury 0–0–7	West Sandanme #8; 4–3	East Makushita #58; 6–1	West Makushita #27; 5–2	East Makushita #15; 4–3
2007	East Makushita #13; 6–1	West Makushita #3; 1–6	West Makushita #26; 6–1	West Makushita #9; 4–3	East Makushita #8; 1–6	East Makushita #23; 6–1
2008	West Makushita #8; 5–2	West Makushita #3; 3–4	West Makushita #6; 5–2	East Makushita #4; 4–3	West Makushita #1; 4–3	West Jūryō #9; 12–3; Champion
2009	East Jūryō #1; 11–4–P; Champion	West Maegashira #12; 7–8	East Maegashira #15; 8–7	East Maegashira #10; 11–4; F	East Maegashira #2; 2–13 ★	East Maegashira #12; 9–6
2010	West Maegashira #9; 3–12	East Jūryō #1; 7–8	East Jūryō #2; 8–7	West Maegashira #16; 5–10	East Jūryō #5; 9–6	East Maegashira #16; 9–6
2011	East Maegashira #11; 8–7	West Maegashira #8; Tournament Cancelled; Match fixing investigation 0–0–0	West Maegashira #8; 4–11	West Maegashira #13; 7–8	West Maegashira #14; 9–6	East Maegashira #8; Sat out due to injury 0–0–15
2012	East Jūryō #5; 8–7	East Maegashira #16; 9–6	East Maegashira #11; 9–6	West Maegashira #6; 7–8	West Maegashira #7; 6–9	East Maegashira #9; 5–10
2013	East Maegashira #14; 8–7	East Maegashira #12; 8–7	East Maegashira #11; 5–10	West Maegashira #16; 9–6	West Maegashira #10; 5–10	East Maegashira #15; 9–6
2014	East Maegashira #11; 2–13	East Jūryō #4; 4–9–2	West Jūryō #8; 9–6	East Jūryō #4; 8–7	East Jūryō #3; 6–9	East Jūryō #4; 7–8
2015	East Jūryō #5; 5–10	West Jūryō #9; 8–7	West Jūryō #6; 4–11	East Jūryō #13; 7–8	West Jūryō #13; 3–12	West Makushita #6; 6–1
2016	East Makushita #1; 4–3	East Jūryō #14; 3–9–3	East Makushita #7; 2–5	East Makushita #22; 5–2	West Makushita #12; 3–4	East Makushita #19; 6–1
2017	East Makushita #7; 1–6	East Makushita #24; 1–6	East Makushita #49; 3–4	West Makushita #59; 5–2	West Makushita #41; Sat out due to injury 0–0–7	West Sandanme #21; Sat out due to injury 0–0–7
2018	West Sandanme #81; Retired –	x	x	x	x	x
Record given as wins–losses–absences Top division champion Top division runner-up Retired Lower divisions Non-participation Sanshō key: F=Fighting spirit; O=Outstanding performance; T=Technique Also shown: ★=Kinboshi; P=Playoff(s); Divisions: Makuuchi — Jūryō — Makushita — Sandanme — Jonidan — Jonokuchi Makuuchi ranks: Yokozuna — Ōzeki — Sekiwake — Komusubi — Maegashira

== See also ==
- Glossary of sumo terms
- List of sumo elders
- List of past sumo wrestlers
- List of Mongolian sumo wrestlers
- List of non-Japanese sumo wrestlers
- List of sumo second division champions
