= 2010 in sumo =

The following are the events in professional sumo during 2010.

== Tournaments ==
=== Hatsu basho ===
Ryogoku Kokugikan, Tokyo, 10 January – 24 January

2010 Hatsu basho results - Makuuchi Division
W		L		A	East			Rank	West			W		L		A
12	-	3	-	0		(Mongolia)	**Hakuhō**	Y		(Mongolia)	**Asashōryū**	13	-	2	-	0
9	-	6	-	0		(Bulgaria)	**Kotoōshū**	O		(Mongolia)	**Harumafuji**	10	-	5	-	0
1	-	7	-	7	ø	(Japan)	Kotomitsuki	O		(Japan)	**Kaiō**	9	-	6	-	0
12	-	3	-	0		(Estonia)	**Baruto**	S	ø	(Japan)	Chiyotaikai	0	-	4	-	0
6	-	9	-	0		(Japan)	Kotoshōgiku	K		(Mongolia)	Kakuryū	7	-	8	-	0
8	-	7	-	0		(Japan)	**Toyonoshima**	M1		(Georgia (country))	Tochinoshin	5	-	10	-	0
7	-	8	-	0		(Japan)	Gōeidō	M2		(Japan)	Miyabiyama	5	-	10	-	0
3	-	12	-	0		(Japan)	Hokutōriki	M3		(Japan)	**Kisenosato**	9	-	6	-	0
6	-	9	-	0		(Japan)	Kakizoe	M4		(Japan)	Takekaze	6	-	9	-	0
6	-	9	-	0		(Japan)	Yoshikaze	M5		(Mongolia)	**Kyokutenhō**	8	-	7	-	0
2	-	13	-	0		(Japan)	Bushūyama	M6		(Japan)	**Aminishiki**	11	-	4	-	0
8	-	7	-	0		(Mongolia)	**Tamawashi**	M7		(Japan)	**Wakanosato**	9	-	6	-	0
5	-	5	-	5	ø	(Mongolia)	Tokitenkū	M8		(Mongolia)	Asasekiryū	6	-	9	-	0
5	-	10	-	0		(Georgia (country))	Kokkai	M9		**(Mongolia)**	Shōtenrō	3	-	12	-	0
8	-	7	-	0		(Japan)	**Tochiōzan**	M10		(Russia)	**Aran**	10	-	5	-	0
7	-	8	-	0		(Japan)	Takamisakari	M11		(Japan)	Mōkonami	6	-	9	-	0
9	-	6	-	0		(Japan)	**Hōmashō**	M12		(Japan)	**Tosayutaka**	10	-	5	-	0
7	-	8	-	0		**(Japan)**	Tamanoshima	M13		(Japan)	**Shimotori**	8	-	7	-	0
9	-	6	-	0		**(Japan)**	**Iwakiyama**	M14		**(Mongolia)**	**Hakuba**	9	-	6	-	0
9	-	6	-	0		(Japan)	**Kitataiki**	M15		(Japan)	Tochinonada	5	-	10	-	0
3	-	12	-	0		**(Mongolia)**	Kōryū	M16		(Japan)	**Toyohibiki**	12	-	3	-	0

ø - Indicates a pull-out or absent rank
**winning record in bold**
**Yusho Winner**

=== Haru basho ===
Osaka Prefectural Gymnasium, Osaka, 14 March – 28 March

2010 Haru basho results - Makuuchi Division
W		L		A	East			Rank	West			W		L		A
15	-	0	-	0		(Mongolia)	**Hakuhō**	Y	ø							
10	-	5	-	0		(Mongolia)	**Harumafuji**	O		(Bulgaria)	**Kotoōshū**	10	-	5	-	0
8	-	7	-	0		(Japan)	**Kaiō**	O		(Japan)	**Kotomitsuki**	9	-	6	-	0
14	-	1	-	0		(Estonia)	**Baruto**	S		(Japan)	Toyonoshima	6	-	9	-	0
9	-	6	-	0		(Japan)	**Kisenosato**	K		(Japan)	**Aminishiki**	8	-	7	-	0
6	-	9	-	0		(Mongolia)	Kakuryū	M1		(Japan)	Wakanosato	6	-	9	-	0
3	-	12	-	0		(Mongolia)	Kyokutenhō	M2		(Russia)	Aran	1	-	14	-	0
2	-	4	-	9	ø	(Japan)	Gōeidō	M3		(Japan)	**Kotoshōgiku**	10	-	5	-	0
5	-	10	-	0		(Mongolia)	Tamawashi	M4		(Japan)	Tosayutaka	3	-	12	-	0
4	-	11	-	0		(Japan)	Toyohibiki	M5		(Japan)	**Hōmashō**	9	-	6	-	0
11	-	4	-	0		(Japan)	**Tochiōzan**	M6		(Georgia (country))	**Tochinoshin**	9	-	6	-	0
10	-	5	-	0		(Japan)	**Miyabiyama**	M7		(Japan)	Kakizoe	7	-	8	-	0
8	-	7	-	0		(Japan)	**Iwakiyama**	M8		(Japan)	Takekaze	5	-	10	-	0
8	-	7	-	0		(Mongolia)	**Hakuba**	M9		(Japan)	Yoshikaze	5	-	10	-	0
10	-	5	-	0		(Japan)	**Kitataiki**	M10		(Japan)	Shimotori	5	-	10	-	0
10	-	5	-	0		(Mongolia)	**Asasekiryū**	M11		(Japan)	Hokutōriki	6	-	9	-	0
8	-	7	-	0		(Japan)	**Okinoumi**	M12		(Japan)	Takamisakari	7	-	8	-	0
10	-	5	-	0		(Mongolia)	**Tokitenkū**	M13		(Mongolia)	**Tokusegawa**	8	-	7	-	0
10	-	5	-	0		(Georgia (country))	**Kokkai**	M14		(Japan)	Tamanoshima	6	-	9	-	0
6	-	9	-	0		(Japan)	Sagatsukasa	M15		(Japan)	**Mōkonami**	9	-	6	-	0
5	-	10	-	0		**(South Korea)**	Kasugaō	M16		(Japan)	Bushūyama	4	-	11	-	0

ø - Indicates a pull-out or absent rank
**winning record in bold**
**Yusho Winner**

=== Natsu Basho ===
Ryogoku Kokugikan, Tokyo, 9 May – 23 May

2010 Natsu basho results - Makuuchi Division
W		L		A	East			Rank	West			W		L		A
15	-	0	-	0		(Mongolia)	**Hakuhō**	Y	ø							
9	-	6	-	0		(Mongolia)	**Harumafuji**	O		(Bulgaria)	**Kotoōshū**	9	-	6	-	0
9	-	6	-	0		(Japan)	**Kotomitsuki**	O		(Japan)	**Kaiō**	9	-	9	-	0
					ø			O		(Estonia)	**Baruto**	10	-	5	-	0
8	-	7	-	0		(Japan)	**Kisenosato**	S		(Japan)	Aminishiki	5	-	10	-	0
9	-	6	-	0		(Japan)	**Kotoshōgiku**	K		(Japan)	Tochiōzan	7	-	8	-	0
5	-	10	-	0		(Japan)	Toyonoshima	M1		(Japan)	Miyabiyama	5	-	10	-	0
0	-	7	-	8	ø	(Japan)	Hōmashō	M2		(Georgia (country))	**Tochinoshin**	8	-	7	-	0
6	-	9	-	0		(Mongolia)	Kakuryū	M3		(Japan)	Wakanosato	6	-	9	-	0
7	-	8	-	0		(Japan)	Kitataiki	M4		(Mongolia)	**Asasekiryū**	9	-	6	-	0
0	-	0	-	15	ø	(Japan)	Iwakiyama	M5		(Mongolia)	**Hakuba**	10	-	5	-	0
8	-	7	-	0		(Mongolia)	**Tokitenkū**	M6		(Georgia (country))	Kokkai	3	-	12	-	0
3	-	12	-	0		(Mongolia)	Tamawashi	M7		(Mongolia)	**Kyokutenhō**	9	-	6	-	0
7	-	8	-	0		(Japan)	Kakizoe	M8		(Japan)	**Toyohibiki**	8	-	7	-	0
7	-	8	-	0		(Japan)	Tosayutaka	M9		(Japan)	**Gōeidō**	9	-	6	-	0
12	-	3	-	0		(Russia)	**Aran**	M10		(Japan)	Okinoumi	5	-	10	-	0
8	-	7	-	0		(Mongolia)	**Mōkonami**	M11		(Mongolia)	**Tokusegawa**	9	-	6	-	0
8	-	7	-	0		(Japan)	**Takekaze**	M12		(Japan)	Kimurayama	7	-	8	-	0
9	-	6	-	0		(Japan)	**Yoshikaze**	M13		(Japan)	**Takamisakari**	8	-	7	-	0
3	-	12	-	0		(Japan)	Tochinonada	M14		(Japan)	Hokutōriki	7	-	8	-	0
10	-	5	-	0		(Japan)	**Wakakoyu**	M15		(Japan)	**Shimotori**	10	-	5	-	0
5	-	10	-	0		(Japan)	Kōryū	M16		(Japan)	Tamanoshima	5	-	10	-	0

ø - Indicates a pull-out or absent rank
**winning record in bold**
**Yusho Winner**

=== Nagoya basho ===
Aichi Prefectural Gymnasium, Nagoya, 11 July – 25 July

2010 Nagoya basho results - Makuuchi Division
W		L		A	East			Rank	West			W		L		A
15	-	0	-	0		(Mongolia)	**Hakuhō**	Y	ø							
8	-	7	-	0		(Estonia)	**Baruto**	O		(Mongolia)	**Harumafuji**	10	-	5	-	0
10	-	5	-	0		(Bulgaria)	**Kotoōshū**	O	ø	(Japan)	Kotomitsuki	0	-	0	-	0
					ø			O		(Japan)	Kaiō	6	-	5	-	4
7	-	8	-	0		(Japan)	Kisenosato	S		(Japan)	Kotoshōgiku	5	-	10	-	0
4	-	11	-	0		(Mongolia)	Hakuba	K		(Georgia (country))	Tochinoshin	6	-	9	-	0
9	-	6	-	0		(Japan)	**Tochiōzan**	M1		(Mongolia)	Asasekiryū	4	-	11	-	0
11	-	4	-	0		(Russia)	**Aran**	M2	ø	(Japan)	Aminishiki	6	-	7	-	2
7	-	8	-	0		(Mongolia)	Kyokutenhō	M3		(Mongolia)	**Tokitenkū**	8	-	7	-	0
0	-	0	-	15	ø	(Japan)	Gōeidō	M4		(Japan)	Kitataiki	6	-	9	-	0
0	-	0	-	15	ø	(Japan)	Toyonoshima	M5	ø	(Japan)	Miyabiyama	0	-	0	-	15
11	-	4	-	0		(Mongolia)	**Kakuryū**	M6	ø	(Japan)	Toyohibiki	0	-	0	-	15
9	-	6	-	0		(Japan)	**Wakanosato**	M7		(Mongolia)	**Tokusegawa**	8	-	7	-	0
0	-	0	-	15	ø	(Japan)	Wakakoyu	M8		(Japan)	Yoshikaze	5	-	10	-	0
6	-	9	-	0		(Japan)	Shimotori	M9		(Japan)	Kakizoe	3	-	12	-	0
8	-	7	-	0		(Mongolia)	**Mōkonami**	M10		(Japan)	**Tosayutaka**	8	-	7	-	0
6	-	9	-	0		(Japan)	Takekaze	M11		(Japan)	**Takamisakari**	9	-	6	-	0
5	-	10	-	0		(Georgia (country))	Gagamaru	M12		(Georgia (country))	**Kokkai**	8	-	7	-	0
11	-	4	-	0		(Japan)	**Hōmashō**	M13		(Japan)	**Kimurayama**	8	-	7	-	0
7	-	8	-	0		(Mongolia)	Tamawashi	M14	ø	(Japan)	Okinoumi	0	-	0	-	15
8	-	7	-	0		(Japan)	**Bushūyama**	M15		(Japan)	**Hokutōriki**	8	-	7	-	0
5	-	10	-	0		(Japan)	Tamaasuka	M16		(Mongolia)	Shōtenrō	5	-	10	-	0

ø - Indicates a pull-out or absent rank
**winning record in bold**
**Yusho Winner**

=== Aki basho ===
Ryogoku Kokugikan, Tokyo, 12 September – 26 September

2010 Aki basho results - Makuuchi Division
W		L		A	East			Rank	West			W		L		A
15	-	0	-	0		(Mongolia)	**Hakuhō**	Y	ø							
8	-	7	-	0		(Mongolia)	**Harumafuji**	O		(Bulgaria)	**Kotoōshū**	10	-	5	-	0
8	-	7	-	0		(Estonia)	**Baruto**	O		(Japan)	**Kaiō**	8	-	7	-	0
7	-	8	-	0		(Russia)	Aran	S		(Japan)	**Tochiōzan**	11	-	4	-	0
7	-	8	-	0		(Japan)	Kisenosato	K		(Mongolia)	**Kakuryū**	9	-	6	-	0
2	-	13	-	0		(Mongolia)	Tokitenkū	M1		(Japan)	Wakanosato	5	-	10	-	0
7	-	8	-	0		(Japan)	Hōmashō	M2		(Georgia (country))	**Tochinoshin**	9	-	6	-	0
9	-	6	-	0		(Japan)	**Kotoshōgiku**	M3		(Mongolia)	Kyokutenhō	4	-	11	-	0
6	-	9	-	0		(Mongolia)	Tokusegawa	M4		(Japan)	**Aminishiki**	8	-	7	-	0
4	-	11	-	0		(Japan)	Takamisakari	M5		(Mongolia)	**Hakuba**	8	-	7	-	0
5	-	10	-	0		(Mongolia)	Mōkonami	M6		(Mongolia)	**Asasekiryū**	9	-	6	-	0
9	-	6	-	0		(Japan)	**Kitataiki**	M7		(Japan)	Tosayutaka	6	-	9	-	0
8	-	7	-	0		(Georgia (country))	**Kokkai**	M8	ø	(Japan)	Masatsukasa	0	-	0	-	15
8	-	7	-	0		(Japan)	**Kimurayama**	M9		(Japan)	Bushūyama	6	-	9	-	0
4	-	9	-	2	ø	(Japan)	Hokutōriki	M10		(Japan)	**Shimotori**	8	-	7	-	0
9	-	6	-	0		(Japan)	**Kotokasuga**	M11		(Japan)	**Yoshikaze**	11	-	4	-	0
6	-	9	-	0		(Mongolia)	Kōryū	M12		(Japan)	**Takekaze**	12	-	3	-	0
6	-	9	-	0		**(South Korea)**	Kasugaō	M13		(China)	**Sōkokurai**	8	-	7	-	0
8	-	7	-	0		(Japan)	**Tochinonada**	M14		(Mongolia)	**Tamawashi**	10	-	5	-	0
10	-	5	-	0		(Georgia (country))	**Gagamaru**	M15		(Japan)	Kakizoe	3	-	12	-	0
4	-	11	-	0		(Japan)	Kyokunankai	M16		(Japan)	Tosanoumi	2	-	13	-	0
6	-	9	-	0		(Japan)	Toyozakura	M17	ø							

ø - Indicates a pull-out or absent rank
**winning record in bold**
**Yusho Winner**

=== Kyushu basho ===
Fukuoka International Centre, Kyushu, 14 November – 28 November

2010 Kyushu basho results - Makuuchi Division
W		L		A	East			Rank	West			W		L		A
14	-	1	-	0		(Mongolia)	**Hakuhō***	Y	ø							
8	-	7	-	0		(Bulgaria)	**Kotoōshū**	O		(Estonia)	**Baruto**	11	-	4	-	0
0	-	4	-	11	ø	(Mongolia)	Harumafuji	O		(Japan)	**Kaiō**	12	-	3	-	0
7	-	8	-	0		(Japan)	Tochiōzan	S		(Mongolia)	Kakuryū	7	-	8	-	0
4	-	11	-	0		(Russia)	Aran	K		(Georgia (country))	Tochinoshin	6	-	9	-	0
10	-	5	-	0		(Japan)	**Kisenosato**	M1		(Japan)	**Kotoshōgiku**	9	-	6	-	0
8	-	7	-	0		(Japan)	**Aminishiki**	M2		(Mongolia)	Asasekiryū	6	-	9	-	0
7	-	8	-	0		(Japan)	Hōmashō	M3		(Japan)	Kitataiki	5	-	10	-	0
4	-	11	-	0		(Mongolia)	Hakuba	M4		(Japan)	Takekaze	6	-	9	-	0
8	-	7	-	0		(Japan)	**Yoshikaze**	M5		(Japan)	Wakanosato	5	-	10	-	0
4	-	11	-	0		(Georgia (country))	Kokkai	M6		(Mongolia)	**Tokusegawa**	8	-	7	-	0
5	-	10	-	0		(Japan)	Kotokasuga	M7		(Japan)	Kimurayama	5	-	10	-	0
9	-	6	-	0		(Mongolia)	**Tamawashi**	M8	ø	(Japan)	Shimotori	6	-	9	-	0
9	-	6	-	0		(Mongolia)	**Kyokutenhō**	M9		(Japan)	**Toyonoshima**	14	-	1	-	0
9	-	6	-	0		(Georgia (country))	**Gagamaru**	M10		(Japan)	**Tosayutaka**	9	-	6	-	0
7	-	8	-	0		(Mongolia)	Mōkonami	M11		(Mongolia)	**Tokitenkū**	8	-	7	-	0
8	-	7	-	0		(Japan)	**Takamisakari**	M12		(Japan)	Bushūyama	3	-	12	-	0
6	-	6	-	0		(China)	Sōkokurai	M13		(Japan)	Tochinonada	6	-	9	-	0
12	-	3	-	0		(Japan)	**Gōeidō**	M14		(Japan)	**Miyabiyama**	9	-	6	-	0
8	-	7	-	0		(Mongolia)	**Kōryū**	M15		**(South Korea)**	Kasugaō	5	-	10	-	0
9	-	6	-	0		(Mongolia)	**Shōtenrō**	M16		(Japan)	**Okinoumi**	8	-	7	-	0
0	-	0	-	15	ø	(Japan)	Hokutōriki	M17	ø							

ø - Indicates a pull-out or absent rank
**winning record in bold**
**Yusho Winner**
***Won Playoff**

== News ==
=== January ===
- 12: At the Hatsu basho in Tokyo, ozeki Kaio wins his 808th top makuuchi division bout by throwing down former ozeki Chiyotaikai, breaking the record set by Chiyonofuji in 1991. It is Chiyotaikai's third defeat in the first three days, leaving his hopes of getting promoted back to ozeki by scoring 10–5 or better virtually gone.
- 13: Chiyotaikai announces his retirement from sumo. He will stay in the sumo world as a coach at Kokonoe stable, under the name Sanoyama Oyakata.
- 19: The 65th Yokozuna Takanohana is told to leave the Nishonoseki ichimon or group of stables after announcing that he will run for a position on the board of Directors of the Japan Sumo Association against the two officially sanctioned candidates for the group. Six of Takanohana's supporters, Otake (the former Takatoriki), Futagoyama (the former Dairyu), Otowayama (the former Takanonami), Tokiwayama (the former Takamisugi), Onomatsu (the former Masurao) and Magaki (the former Wakanohana II), are also kicked out of the ichimon.
- 23: Yokozuna Asashoryu wins his 25th yūshō or championship by defeating ozeki Harumafuji by shitatenage or underarm throw. His score of 13 wins against just one loss means he cannot be caught by any of his rivals. He is now alone in third place on the all-time list of top division championships, behind only Taiho and Chiyonofuji.
- 24: On the final day of competition, Hakuho defeats Asashoryu to finish runner-up to his yokozuna rival on 12–3. Having lost only four regulation bouts in the whole of 2009, his three losses in this tournament (to Baruto, Harumafuji and Kaio) are the most he has suffered since May 2008. Baruto also finishes on 12–3, and wins his first Outstanding Performance Award. Had he achieved kachi-koshi, maegashira Goeido would have received a share of that prize as he defeated Asashoryu earlier in the tournament, but he loses to Aminishiki who receives the Technique Award. The third man on 12–3 is Toyohibiki, who wins the Fighting Spirit Prize. The jūryō division championship is won by Georgian Gagamaru. Two former maegashira who have been fighting in the third makushita division for some time, Tamarikido and Daimanazuru, both announce their retirements. Tamarikido is staying in sumo as Araiso Oyakata, but Daimanazuru is leaving.
- 25: Asashoryu is warned over his conduct by Sumo Association head Musashigawa after reportedly punching one of his managers during a drunken night out after Day 6 of the basho.
- 27: The promotions to the jūryō division for the Haru tournament in March are announced. There are three newcomers: Masuraumi (formerly Kurosawa, his new shikona is based on that of his stablemaster, the former Masurao) and Daido (formerly Nakanishi), both from the Onomatsu stable, and Sadanofuji from the Sakaigawa stable. In addition, Tokushinho from Kise stable returns to the jūryō division after two tournaments away.
- 28: The weekly magazine Shukan Shincho hits the newsstands and claims that the man allegedly assaulted by Asashoryu was not his manager but another acquaintance in charge of a dance club where Asashoryu was drinking, who received a broken nose. Amid suggestions of a cover-up, the Sumo Association demand an explanation.
- 30: Musashigawa says that Asashoryu has reached an amicable settlement with the man he allegedly attacked, meaning the yokozuna will not face police charges, although the chairman has not seen written confirmation. He confirms that any punishment will not be decided on until the next board meeting on February 4.
- 30: The danpatsu-shiki or retirement ceremony of former maegashira Otsukasa takes place at the Kokugikan.
- 31: The retirement ceremony of former maegashira Ushiomaru is held at the Kokugikan. Asashoryu performs the dohyo-iri and takes a snip of Ushiomaru's hair.

=== February ===
Yokozuna Asashoryu retired in February.

- 1: The first contested elections to the Sumo Association's board of Directors since 2002 are held. Independent candidate Takanohana is elected with the necessary ten votes, replacing the 62-year-old Oshima who can only manage eight. Michinoku and Kagamiyama are the other new members of the ten man board. Isenoumi did not run for re-election, as he is due to retire from the Association next year. Musashigawa retains his position as chairman.
- 2: Ajigawa Oyakata, the former Kobo, admits that he was one of the oyakata who switched his vote from Oshima to Takanohana, and says he will resign from the Sumo Association. He is however later persuaded to stay.
- 2: Tomozuna Oyakata, the former Kaiki, who is heading a committee looking into the Asashoryu affair, says he has spoken to the yokozuna's personal manager (who has said he is standing down to take responsibility for his misleading statement that he was the one attacked) and his driver, who denied reports that Asashoryu punched the man or made threats against him. "The driver did not see Asashoryu slug the man. He said it was nothing like what was reported."
- 4: Following a meeting with the Directors of the Sumo Association, Asashoryu and his stablemaster Takasago announce the yokozuna's retirement from sumo. Asashoryu said, "I have caused a lot of trouble for so many people. I decided to step down to bring this to a closure." Musashigawa told reporters, "He felt compelled to resign for misconduct that was inexcusable, and the board accepted. I want to apologise to sumo fans and the injured person. We will work to ensure this kind of incident never happens again."
- 4: Kataonami Oyakata (former sekiwake Tamanofuji) swaps elder names with Tateyama Oyakata (former sekiwake Tamakasuga), who takes over the running of Kataonami stable.
- 7: The 34th Japan Ozumo one-day knockout exhibition tournament takes place at the Kokugikan. Goeido wins the 2,500,000 yen prize, defeating Baruto, Harumafuji, Hakuho (in the semi-final) and Kotooshu (in the final). He is the first Japanese winner since Musoyama in 2003. Masatsukasa takes the jūryō tournament.
- 10: The 43rd NHK charity sumo tournament takes place.

=== March ===
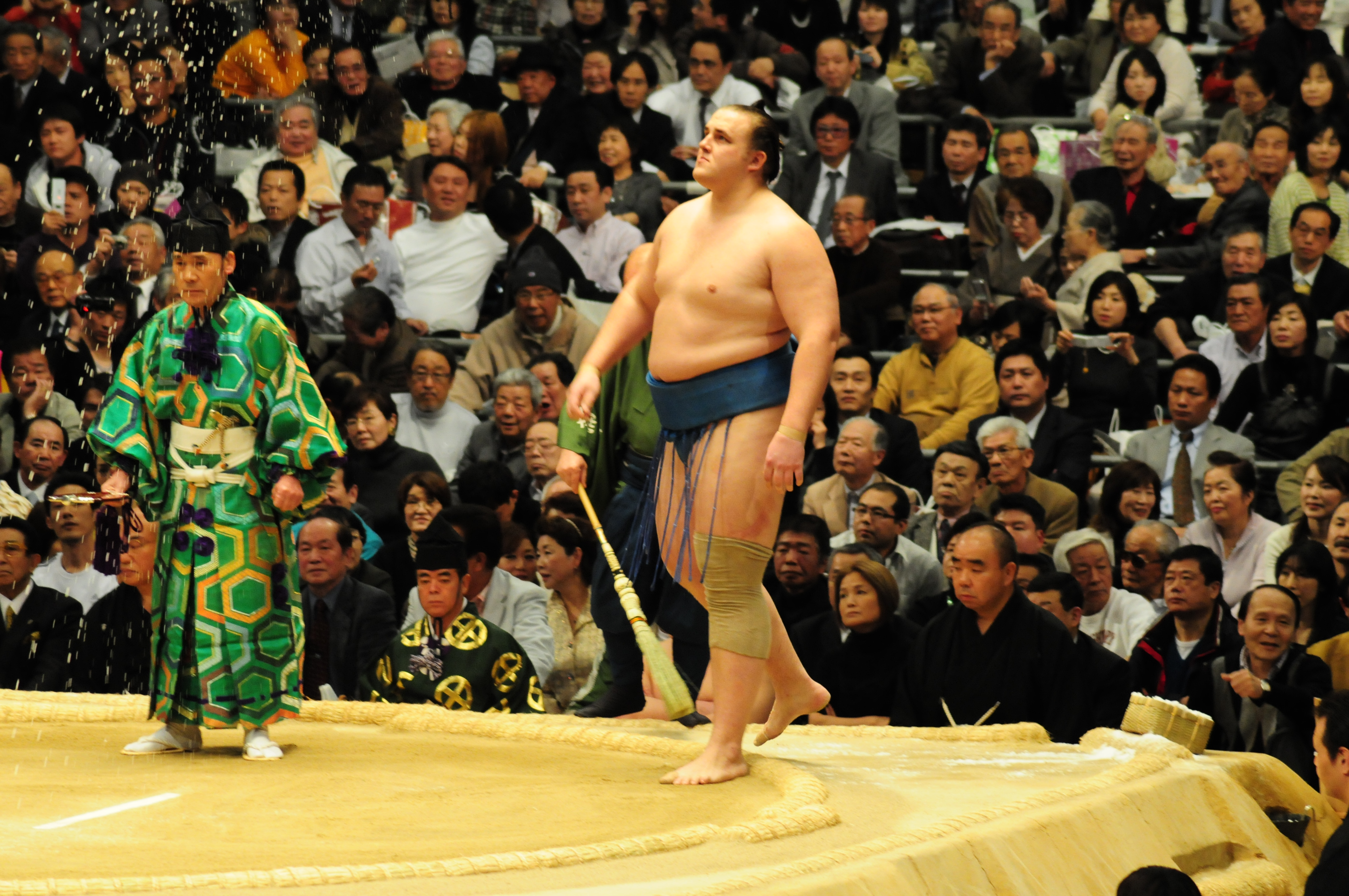
Baruto earned promotion to ozeki in March.

- 1: The banzuke for the upcoming Osaka tournament is released. Asashoryu does not appear in the rankings, and the West Yokozuna position is left blank. There are three newcomers to the top division: Okinoumi, the first wrestler from Shimane Prefecture to reach the top division in 88 years, Tokusegawa, the first wrestler from Kiriyama stable to reach makuuchi, and Sagatsukasa, who has become the second wrestler after Toyonoshima to make the top division despite not meeting the Sumo Association's requirement to enter sumo of 173 cm in height.
- 9: Former maegashira Kitazakura announces his retirement at the age of 38. He becomes Onogawa Oyakata. The former Yotsukasa switches to the Sendagawa name vacated by the retirement of former ozeki Maenoyama, who has reached 65 years of age.
- 28: Hakuho wins his thirteenth yūshō with his fifth perfect 15–0 record, defeating Harumafuji on the final day. Baruto finishes runner-up on 14–1, his only defeat being to Hakuho on Day 11. He is awarded Fighting Spirit and Technique Prizes, and is guaranteed promotion to ozeki. Tochiozan is in third place on 11–4. Okinoumi wins his last three bouts to secure kachi-koshi in his debut. Tokusegawa also scores eight wins, but Sagatsukasa falls short with a 6–9, despite being at 5–3 after Day 8. In the jūryō division Kimurayama wins his second yūshō following a three way play-off after he, Koryu and Tamaasuka all finish on 11–4. Bulgarian Aoiyama wins the makushita division title at his first attempt with an undefeated 7–0 record.
- 31: Baruto's promotion to ozeki is officially confirmed. The decision by the executive board of the Sumo Association was unanimous. He becomes the second European, and eighth foreigner overall, to reach ozeki.
- 31: Three promotions to jūryō for the next tournament are announced. The only newcomer to the division is Komazawa University graduate Yuya Matsutani of Matsugane stable. Returning to jūryō are Oguruma stable's Mongolian rikishi Hoshikaze and Hakkaku stable's Kanbayashi, formerly of Kinki University. (Kanbayashi was last ranked in jūryō in November 2006.)

=== April ===
- The Spring tour or jungyo visits the following locations:
  - 4: Ise Shrine, Mie Prefecture
  - 5: Tsu, Mie Prefecture
  - 9: Yasukuni Shrine, Chiyoda-ku, Tokyo
  - 10: Fujisawa, Kanagawa Prefecture
  - 18: Iruma, Saitama Prefecture
  - 24: Hadano, Kanagawa Prefecture
- 19: Roho and Hakurozan's lawsuit contesting their dismissal from the Sumo Association over cannabis use is rejected by the Tokyo District Court, which finds that the procedures followed and the punishments handed out were reasonable. The brothers' lawyer says they will appeal the ruling.
- 26: The banzuke for the upcoming tournament in May is released. There are once again five ozeki, with Baruto in the Ozeki 3 West position. There are no newcomers to the top division but Kimurayama, Tochinonada, Koryu and Wakakoyu all return. There are no rikishi making their sanyaku debuts for the sixth tournament in a row.

=== May ===
- 9–23: At the Natsu basho in Tokyo, Hakuho wins his 14th championship, equalling the total won by Wajima. It is his second consecutive perfect 15–0 score and he is now on a winning streak of 32 matches; his second best run after the 33 he won from January to March 2009. In second place is rank-and-filer Aran on 12–3, who wins the Fighting Spirit prize. He shares the award with Tochinoshin, who defeated four ozeki. Kaio wins his 1000th career match, becoming only the second man after Chiyonofuji to reach this total. New ozeki Baruto finishes on 10–5. The jūryō championship is won for the second time by Bushuyama.
- 20: Ozeki Kotomitsuki is accused by the Shukan Shincho of betting on professional baseball, which is illegal in Japan. Kotomitsuki denies the claims. Michinoku Oyakata, head of the Sumo Association's Daily Life Guidance department, launches an internal investigation into the matter.
- 27: Two coaches, Kise Oyakata (the former Higonoumi) and Kiyomigata Oyakata (the former Dairyugawa), are punished for being implicated in the selling of tickets for last year's Nagoya basho to some 50 yakuza gang members of the Yamaguchi-gumi crime syndicate. Kise is demoted two ranks in the Sumo Association's hierarchy and can no longer continue as the head of Kise stable, which is to be closed. Kiyomigata escapes with a reprimand.
- 29:Former Sumo Association chairman Kitanoumi confirms that his Kitanoumi stable will take charge of the 27 wrestlers formerly of Kise stable. This means his stable will now have 46 wrestlers, making it the largest in sumo.
- 29: The retirement ceremony of former ozeki Dejima is held at the Kokugikan.

=== June ===
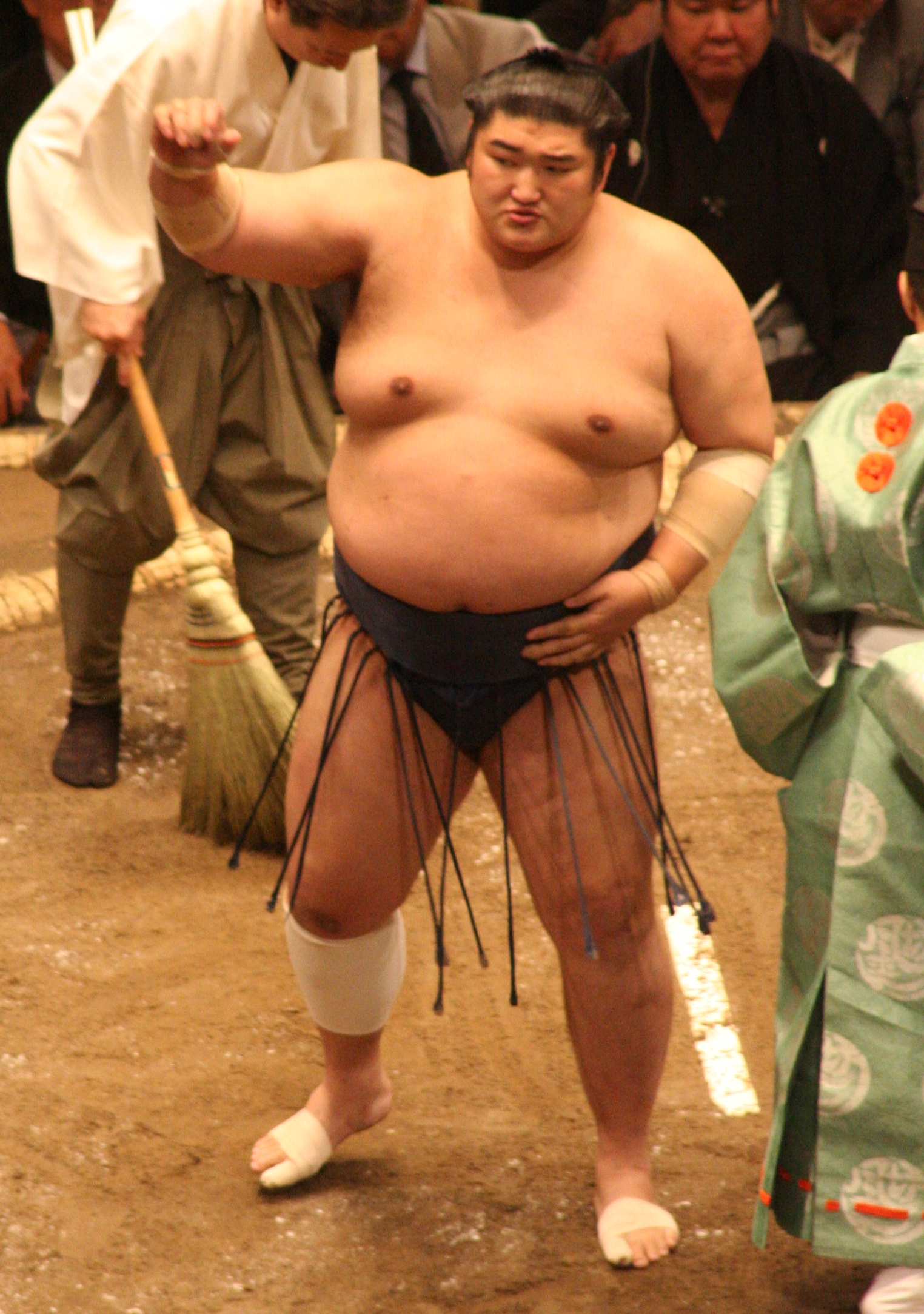
Ozeki Kotomitsuki was expelled for illegal gambling.

- 15: The results of a survey conducted by the Sumo Association following the gambling allegations against Kotomitsuki show that 65 people in the sumo world have engaged in some form of gambling over the last five years. 29 bet on baseball while the rest were involved in gambling on other activities such as golf, mahjong and hanafuda games. Kotomitsuki, who has reversed his previous denials and admitted to betting on baseball, is suspended from the forthcoming Nagoya tournament in July following a request from his stablemaster. He was reportedly deep in debt and being blackmailed for "hush money" by members of the yakuza. The Sumo Association, who have turned the results of their survey over to the Japanese ministry of sport, have issued a warning to all 65 of their members involved and will wait for the results of the police investigation into the affair before deciding on any further punishments.
- 17: Otake Oyakata, head of the Otake stable, admits that he too has gambled on baseball. He and maegashira Toyonoshima are named in another Shukan Shinko article and are questioned by the Sumo Association's investigative team.
- 18: Tokitsukaze Oyakata, Goeido and Toyohibiki are the latest to admit to involvement in illegal baseball gambling.
- 19: The retirement ceremony of former maegashira Tamarikido is held at the Kokugikan.
- 19: Former ozeki Miyabiyama, who belongs to the head of the Sumo Association's stable, admits to gambling on mahjong and other games, but not baseball.
- 20: Tokoike, a tokoyama at the Onomatsu stable, is the first non wrestler or stablemaster to admit involvement in baseball gambling.
- 21: The Sumo Association announces that it will decide on July 4 whether the Nagoya tournament should go ahead. The list of names mixed up in the scandal continues to grow with Chiyohakuho now added, while Miyabiyama has reportedly admitted betting on baseball as well.
- 22: Kotoshogiku, Futeno and Kiyoseumi are latest sekitori to admit to gambling.
- 22: Nagatanien, a maker of noodles, rice mixes and soups, announces that it has cancelled its 12 million yen ($130,000) sponsorship for the Nagoya tournament due to the gambling scandal. A statement read, "We hope this traditional national sport will become clean."
- 24: A former makushita level wrestler, Mitsutomo Furuichi (known as Wakaryusei while active) is arrested on suspicion of extorting 3.5 million yen from Kotomitsuki, who indicated to those close around him in March that Furuichi had links to organised crime.
- 28: Ahead of an emergency board meeting, Otake Oyakata submits a letter of resignation to the Sumo Association. He now claims that the 5 million yen that Kotomitsuki attempted to collect from a gambling intermediary, that led to the extortion attempt, was in fact Otake's own winnings.
- 28: The emergency meeting decides to accept the recommendations of a special oversight panel and go ahead with the Nagoya basho on July 11. It indicates that Kotomitsuki and Otake Oyakata will both be fired from the sport, although a formal vote will not be taken until July 4. In addition, Tokitsukaze Oyakata will face demotion, while six makuuchi wrestlers (Toyonoshima, Miyabiyama, Toyohibiki, Goeido, Okinoumi and Wakakoyu), five from jūryō and two from makushita will be suspended for Nagoya. The panel has also recommended the suspension of Musashigawa and three other directors (Kokonoe, Michinoku and Dewanoumi) for the tournament, and the closure of the Otake and Tokitsukaze stables.

=== July ===
- 1: Fuji Xerox becomes the latest company to announce it is dropping kensho sponsorship at the Nayoga basho.
- 2: Japanese TV network NHK says it is considering the unprecedented step of refusing to broadcast the Nagoya basho in response to the gambling scandal.
- 4: Kotomitsuki and Ōtake are dismissed from sumo and given life bans. Kotomitsuki receives retirement benefits but Otake does not. Sumo Association head Musashigawa is suspended for the duration of the Nagoya basho and replaced by outsider Hiroyoshi Murayama. Board member Takanohana offers his resignation, but it is not accepted. The Otake and Tokitsukaze stables are spared closure, but Tokitsukaze Oyakata is demoted to the lowest rung on the Sumo Association's hierarchy and must remain there for five years. Mass apologies for the scandal by nearly 80 wrestlers, led by Hakuho, follow at a press conference.
- 5: The banzuke for the Nagoya tournament is finally released. It is the first time since 1946 that publication has been delayed. Kotomitsuki is still listed as ozeki as the Association did not have time to remove his name before the 400,000 copies were printed.
- 6: NHK announces that it will not broadcast the basho live, although it will show nightly highlights. About 70 percent of viewers who contacted the broadcaster were in favour of the coverage being dropped. It is the first time this has occurred since live TV broadcasts began in 1953.
- 7: Police raid the Onomatsu and Tokitsukaze stables as part of their ongoing investigations into the gambling scandal and its links to the yakuza underworld.
- 10: At the dohyo-matsuri (a ceremony open to the public the day before a tournament when the dohyo is sanctified) around 200 members of the Sumo Association, led by its temporary head, mount the ring bow heads and collectively apologise.
- 11: The Nagoya basho begins, with eleven sekitori (not including the dismissed Kotomitsuki) kyujo or absent, breaking the record of eight seen in May 2000 and July 2002. McDonald's is one of the few sponsors to continue providing prize money for bouts. For the first time since its introduction in 1926, the Emperor's Cup will not be awarded to the tournament winner.
- 12: The former Kotomitsuki's home is searched by the police.
- 13:Sanoyama Oyakata (the former Chiyotaikai) denies betting on baseball and visiting an online casino, as claimed by the latest issue of the Shukan Shincho magazine, and says he intends to take legal action.
- 21: Kaio is forced to withdraw with a shoulder injury, leaving no Japanese wrestlers fighting from the yokozuna or ozeki ranks.
- 23: Aminishiki pulls out with an injured knee, meaning more foreigners than Japanese are competing in the top division for the first time ever.
- 24: Hakuho wraps up his fifteenth yūshō after rank-and-filer Homasho is defeated by Tokusegawa. The yokozuna defeats Harumafuji to extend his winning streak to 46 bouts, surpassing Taiho to stand alone in third place in the Shōwa and Heisei eras.
- 25: On the final day Hakuho beats Baruto to become the first wrestler ever to win three consecutive tournaments with 15–0 records. Homasho, Aran and Kakuryu all finish runners-up on 11–4. Homasho and Aran share the Fighting Spirit prize while Kakuryu gets his fifth Technique award. The jūryō championship is won by Masatsukasa while veteran Jumonji wins the makushita yūshō.
- 27: Minato Oyakata (former komusubi Yutakayama), head of the Minato stable, swaps toshiyori names with Tatsutagawa Oyakata (former maegashira Minatofuji), who takes control of the stable.

=== August ===
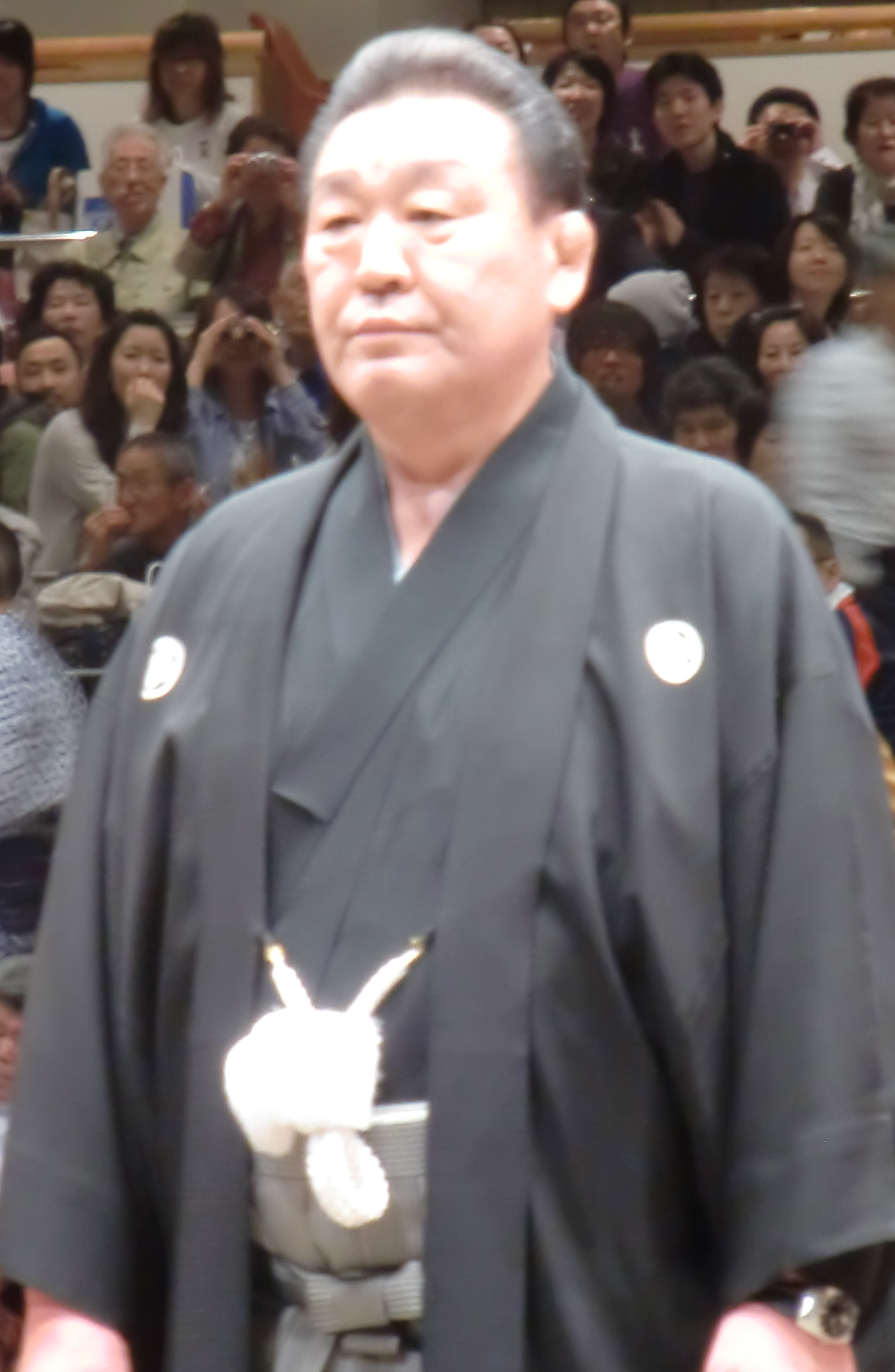
Sumo Association chairman Musashigawa stood down in August.

- 2: Three members of the Yamaguchi-gumi crime syndicate are arrested on suspicion of extorting 6 million yen from a former wrestler from the Onomatsu stable who acted as a middleman for Kotomitsuki and Otake. Another ex-wrestler, Mitsutomo Furuichi, is also rearrested for alleged extortion.
- 6: The summer tour begins at Minamiuonuma, Niigata.
- 7: The next stop on the tour is Niigata city.
- 8: The tour moves on to Fukushima.
- 10: The tour visits Akita city.
- 11: The tour stops at Kitaakita, Akita.
- 12: The head of the Sumo Association Musashigawa announces his resignation, citing both the recent scandals and his own health concerns. He had been hospitalised for much of the previous month after receiving treatment for stomach cancer. He is replaced by Hanaregoma.
- 12: Two more wrestlers, jūryō ranked Matsutani and sandanme ranked Wakarikido, both of the Matsugane stable, are found to have gambled on baseball. Neither wrestler came forward during the Sumo Association's investigations and consequently they competed in the July tournament while others were suspended. The investigative committee will decide on disciplinary action on September 6.
- 30: The banzuke for the Aki basho is released, showing many changes between divisions. All six suspended makuuchi wrestlers, plus Tamaasuka and Shotenro, drop to the jūryō division. Taking their places are the makuuchi veterans Tochinonada, Tosanoumi, Toyozakura and Kasugao, plus Koryu, Masatsukasa and Kotokasuga and debutants Sokokurai and Kyokunankai. Tosanoumi becomes the oldest wrestler ever to earn promotion to the top division at 38 years eight months, while the 105 tournaments Kyokunankai took to reach makuuchi is the second slowest ever. All four suspended jūryō wrestlers lose their sekitori status along with Masuraumi and Kanbayashi. They are replaced by former makuuchi wrestlers Jumonji and Ryuho, and four newcomers: Mongolian Shironoryu, Chinese Nakanokuni, former collegiate competitor Takarafuji and the Korean born Tochinowaka. There are two new sekiwake, Aran and Tochiozan.

=== September ===
- 8: The investigative committee announces that Sadogatake and Matsugane have been demoted two ranks; Sadogatake for failing to supervise Kotomitsuki and Matsugane for accepting lodgings in Osaka for the March tournament from a company president connected to the yakuza. Sandanme wrestler Furuichi and tokoyama Tokoike are formally dismissed, and Matsutani and Wakarikido are suspended for two tournaments.
- 9: Mongolian wrestler Kengo is found unconscious at his Nishonoseki stable and rushed to hospital, two days after suffering a head injury in training. He is found to have a right acute subdural hematoma and undergoes surgery. Kengo, who only joined sumo in March, never returns to active competition and retires in May 2011.
- 18: At the Aki basho, Hakuho wins his 54th straight bout, surpassing Chiyonofuji's post-war record of 53 set in 1988. He is now behind only Futabayama in the modern era.
- 24: Former makushita wrestler Daitensho, a Mongolian who has Japanese citizenship, sues his former stablemaster Takashima Oyakata, alleging that he was forced to retire against his will the previous month. He claims that he was only kept on at Takashima stable because he was the only active wrestler, and that as soon as his stablemaster got a new recruit, he was got rid of.
- 26: Hakuho's dominance continues as he wraps up his sixteenth yūshō by defeating Harumafuji. His 62nd consecutive win gives him his fourth zensho-yūshō in a row and eighth overall, tying the record jointly held by Futabayama and Taiho. Runner-up is rank-and-filer Takekaze on 12–3 who receives the Fighting Spirit prize, shared with stablemate Yoshikaze who finishes on 11–4. Tochiozan also scores eleven on his sekiwake debut and receives his second Technique Award. The best performing ozeki is Kotooshu on 10–5; Kaio secures his kachi-koshi to keep his ozeki rank once again. The jūryō championship is won by Toyonoshima (14–1) on his return from suspension, while the makushita yūshō is won by the 20-year-old Akira Takayasu who is certain to become the first sekitori born in the Heisei era.

=== October ===
- 2: Chiyotakai's retirement ceremony takes place at the Kokugikan.
- 3: Asashoryu's retirement ceremony is held, with around 10,000 fans in attendance. The Prime Minister of Mongolia and the former Prime Minister of Japan are among those taking their turn to snip Asashoryu's hair, along with former yokozuna Chiyonofuji, Asashoryu's stablemate Asasekiryu and rivals Hakuho and Harumafuji. His stablemaster Asashio makes the final cut of his topknot.
- 4: The 69th All Japan Rikishi one day tournament is won by Baruto, who defeats Tochinoshin in the final and receives 500,000 yen. Hakuho is defeated in the first round by Aminishiki.

The Autumn Tour visits the following locations:

- 15: Tsuchiura, Ibaraki Prefecture
- 17: Yokohama, Kanagawa Prefecture
- 23: Amagasaki, Hyogo Prefecture
- 24–25: Otsu, Shiga Prefecture
- 26–27: Kagamino, Okayama Prefecture
- 28: Izumo, Shimane Prefecture
- 29: Shobara, Hiroshima Prefecture
- 30: Hiroshima, Hiroshima Prefecture

=== November ===
- 1: The banzuke for the upcoming Kyushu tournament is released. There are only two Japanese born wrestlers in sanyaku (Kaio and Tochiozan), the fewest ever, and the twenty foreign born wrestlers in makuuchi is the most in history. There are no newcomers to the top division, but five returnees: the gamblers Toyonoshima, Goeido, Miyabiyama and Okinoumi, plus Shotenro. There are however four newcomers to jūryō: the Heisei born Takayasu and Masunoyama, plus Akiseyama (formerly Fukao) and veteran Tsurugidake, who becomes a sekitori at the age of 31 years 8 months. In addition, gambler Chiyohakuho returns to jūryō.
- 15: On the second day of the Kyushu tournament, maegashira Kisenosato defeats Hakuhō, stopping his winning run at 63. Despite falling short of Futabayama's all-time mark of 69, Sumo Association chairman Hanaregoma called Hakuho's streak "a very creditable record." Hakuho told reporters he "couldn't get any momentum today." He admitted that he may have "got too complacent. It's a shame but that's life."
- 18: The Tokyo High Court upholds a lower court ruling that Roho and Hakurozan's dismissal from sumo due to alleged cannabis use was valid.
- 21: Footage emerges on YouTube of a wrestler from the Mihogaseki stable driving a car, defying the Sumo Association's ban. Chairman Hanaregoma says he has issued a strict reprimand to the stablemaster.
- 28: On the final day of the tournament, Hakuhō wins his seventeenth championship, and fifth in a row, by defeating maegashira Toyonoshima in a playoff. He also finishes the year on 86 wins out of a possible 90, equalling the record he set last year. Toyonoshima, who followed up his 14–1 jūryō yusho with the same number of wins this time out, receives special prizes for Technique and Fighting Spirit. Fellow returnee Goeido, who finished on 12–3, does not receive a prize. Instead Kisenosato who scored 10–5, gets the Outstanding Performance Award for his defeat of Hakuho. Kaio finishes on 12–3 (his best performance for six years), one win ahead of fellow ozeki Baruto. The jūryō championship is won by the Brazilian Kaisei in a four-way playoff after he, Toyohibiki, Tochinowaka and debutant Takayasu all finish on 11–4. The makushita championship is won by former jūryō man Myogiryu in another playoff after six wrestlers finish on 6–1.

=== December ===
- 16: Tosanoumi announces his retirement from sumo after scoring only 4–11 last tournament, ensuring his demotion to makushita. The Doshisha University alumnus had more career wins and appearances than any other makushita tsukedashi entrant. He is staying in sumo as a coach at Isenoumi stable under the Tatekawa elder name. His retirement leaves Kaio as the oldest sekitori.
- 21: The banzuke for the January 2011 tournament in Tokyo is released. Kaio is the top ozeki for the first time since July 2007. Toyonoshima moves up to maegashira 1, but is the first maegashira ever to win fourteen bouts and not make the titled sanyaku ranks in the next basho. Nionoumi and Fujiazuma make their jūryō debuts, while Kiyoseumi and Yoshiazuma return to the sekitori ranks.
- 27: Miyagino Oyakata (the former jūryō wrestler Kanechika) is forced by the Sumo Association to give up control of the Miyagino stable after a tape of him admitting involvement in alleged match-fixing in 2006 was obtained by a tabloid and played in a court case. The new head is Kumagatani Oyakata (former maegashira Chikubayama) who was previously in charge of the stable from 1989 to 2004 and has always been regarded as Hakuho's mentor.

== Deaths ==
- 30 March: Former maegashira Dewaarashi, aged 39, of heart failure.
- 1 April: The 28th Kimura Shonosuke, tate gyoji or chief referee from 1991 to 1993, real name Satoru Goto, aged 81.
- 19 June: Former maegashira Narutoumi (also former Takenawa Oyakata), aged 84, of heart failure.
- 20 July: Former ozeki Kitabayama (also former Edagawa Oyakata), aged 75, of liver cancer.
- 6 August: Former ozeki Daikirin (also former Oshiogawa Oyakata), aged 68, of pancreatic cancer.

== See also ==
- Gambling and yakuza ties in sumo
- Glossary of sumo terms
- List of active sumo wrestlers
- List of past sumo wrestlers
- List of years in sumo
- List of yokozuna
