= Sagatsukasa Hiroyuki =

Japanese sumo wrestler

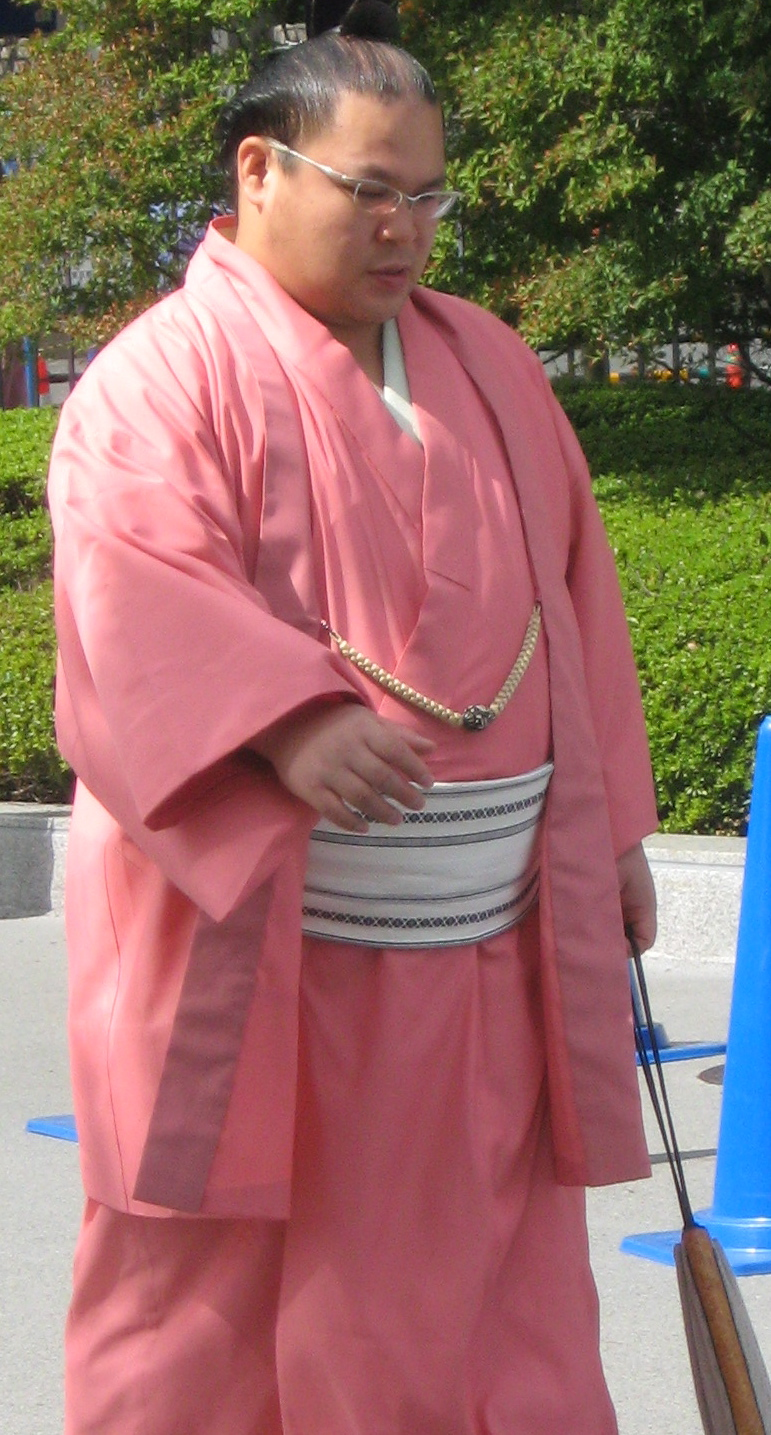
- Sagatsukasa in 2009

Personal information
- Native name: 磋牙司 洋之
- Born: Hiroyuki Isobe; 21 December 1981 (age 44) Shizuoka, Japan
- Height: 1.66 m (5 ft 5 1/2 in)
- Weight: 128 kg (282 lb; 20.2 st)

Sport
- Sport: Sumo
- University team: Toyo University
- Retired: August, 2021
- Heya: Irumagawa
- Record: 467-452-21
- Debut: March, 2004
- Highest rank: Maegashira 9 (Sept, 2011)
- Championships: 1 (Jūryō); 1 (Makushita)
- Updated on August 16, 2021

Sagatsukasa Hiroyuki (Japanese: 磋牙司 洋之; born 21 December 1981 as Hiroyuki Isobe (磯部 洋之)) is a retired Japanese professional sumo wrestler from Mishima, Shizuoka. A former amateur competitor at Toyo University, he made his professional debut in March 2004, reaching the top makuuchi division for the first time in March 2010. He won a makushita and a jūryō division championship. His highest rank was maegashira 9. He was one of the shortest wrestlers in professional sumo at 1.66 m (5 ft 5 1/2 in).

== Early life and sumo background ==
Isobe began practicing sumo as a fourth grader in Mishima City, his hometown. His father encouraged him to drink milk to try to increase his height. In his sixth year of primary school he won a national boys sumo tournament, earning the title of wanpaku-yokozuna for this accomplishment. He decided to join Numazu Gakuen High School and, as a representative for Shizuoka prefecture in a national tournament, won both the team and individual competitions. In his second year of high school in 1998 he took the championship to take the high school yokozuna title. In his third year, he won a Kanazawa tournament and was chosen for a tournament expedition to China, which was also attended by many future stars in sumo. He defeated the future top makuuchi division wrestler Futeno, and also finished ahead of the future Asashōryū. He was a bronze medallist in the inaugural Junior World Sumo Championships in 1999. He went on to Toyo University where the future Kimurayama was his teammate.

== Career ==
Joining Irumagawa stable in March 2004, he was below the official height requirement at just 166 cm but was accepted after passing a secondary examination. Initially fighting under his own surname of Isobe, he recovered from an elbow injury sustained in 2006 to reach the second highest jūryō division in November 2007. He was the second wrestler to pass the secondary height exam and reach juryo, following Toyonoshima. After changing his shikona to Sagatsukasa he initially remained near the bottom of jūryō and was demoted to makushita on several occasions. However he fought his way back and reached the top division in March 2010 after a 9–6 score at jūryō 1. He lasted only one tournament in makuuchi and a series of poor performances back in jūryō saw him demoted to makushita once again. Returning to jūryō in May 2011 he won the yūshō or championship with a 13–2 record and was promoted back to the top division. He lasted four tournaments at the top before being relegated to jūryō for the March 2012 tournament. After six tournaments in the second division, the last two of which he achieved consecutive 9–6 records, he was promoted back to the top division for the March 2013 tournament. However, he was injured and missed the last seven days of the tournament and was again relegated. He only lasted one tournament in jūryō and dropped out of the salaried divisions in July 2013 where he remained until retiring, apart from one brief appearance in jūryō in March 2014.

== Retirement from sumo ==
Sagatsukasa retired in August 2021 at the age of 39 after finishing the previous month's basho in sandanme with a 6–1 record, ending a professional sumo career spanning 17 years. He decided not to remain with the Sumo Association, instead returning to his native Shizuoka Prefecture. One year after his retirement, Sagatsukasa's retirement ceremony was held in Numazu.

== Fighting style ==
Sagatsukasa's Sumo Association profile listed his favoured techniques as kuisagari, an unusual move employed by shorter wrestlers that involves pushing the head against the opponent's chest and grabbing the front part of the mawashi, oshi (pushing) and nage (throwing). His most common winning kimarite were oshi dashi (push out), hiki otoshi (pull down) and tsuki otoshi (thrust over). In September 2011 he defeated Tochinowaka with the spectacular ipponzeoi move, which had only been seen twice in the top division since 1974.

== Career record ==
Sagatsukasa Hiroyuki
Year	January Hatsu basho, Tokyo	March Haru basho, Osaka	May Natsu basho, Tokyo	July Nagoya basho, Nagoya	September Aki basho, Tokyo	November Kyūshū basho, Fukuoka
2004	x	(Maezumo)	West Jonokuchi #15; 5–2	West Jonidan #94; 6–1	East Jonidan #17; 6–1	East Sandanme #55; 6–1
2005	East Sandanme #3; 5–2	West Makushita #43; 5–1–1	East Makushita #31; 4–3	West Makushita #21; 4–3	East Makushita #16; 4–3	East Makushita #13; 3–4
2006	West Makushita #18; 5–2	East Makushita #9; 4–3	West Makushita #6; 0–0–7	East Makushita #47; 4–3	East Makushita #39; 6–1	West Makushita #17; 4–3
2007	West Makushita #14; 3–4	West Makushita #22; 5–2	West Makushita #13; 3–4	East Makushita #19; 7–0; Champion	East Makushita #3; 4–3	East Jūryō #14; 6–9
2008	East Makushita #2; 4–3	West Jūryō #14; 8–7	West Jūryō #12; 7–8	West Jūryō #13; 9–6	East Jūryō #9; 5–10	East Jūryō #14; 6–9
2009	West Makushita #2; 4–3	West Makushita #1; 4–1–2	East Jūryō #14; 7–8	East Makushita #1; 4–3	West Jūryō #11; 9–6	East Jūryō #4; 8–7
2010	West Jūryō #1; 9–6	East Maegashira #15; 6–9	East Jūryō #1; 7–8	West Jūryō #1; 3–12	West Jūryō #10; 5–10	West Makushita #1; 3–4
2011	West Makushita #3; 5–2	Tournament Cancelled; 0–0–0	East Jūryō #12; 13–2; Champion	East Maegashira #13; 8–7	West Maegashira #9; 6–9	West Maegashira #12; 6–9
2012	West Maegashira #14; 5–10	East Jūryō #2; 6–9	West Jūryō #5; 8–7	West Jūryō #3; 6–9	East Jūryō #7; 7–8	West Jūryō #7; 9–6
2013	West Jūryō #2; 9–6	West Maegashira #14; 2–6–7	East Jūryō #7; 4–11	West Makushita #1; 3–5	West Makushita #10; 5–2	East Makushita #6; 4–3
2014	East Makushita #2; 4–3	East Jūryō #14; 4–11	West Makushita #7; 4–3	West Makushita #3; 2–5	East Makushita #14; 3–4	West Makushita #19; 4–3
2015	East Makushita #15; 4–3	West Makushita #11; 4–3	East Makushita #9; 1–6	East Makushita #34; 4–3	East Makushita #27; 3–4	West Makushita #38; 4–3
2016	West Makushita #30; 5–2	West Makushita #17; 1–6	East Makushita #42; 4–3	West Makushita #34; 6–1	East Makushita #14; 2–5	West Makushita #25; 1–6
2017	East Makushita #47; 6–1	East Makushita #19; 4–3	East Makushita #14; 3–4	East Makushita #20; 5–2	West Makushita #12; 1–6	West Makushita #32; 5–2
2018	East Makushita #23; 3–4	West Makushita #29; 4–3	West Makushita #21; 6–1	East Makushita #7; 3–4	East Makushita #11; 5–2	West Makushita #3; 3–4
2019	West Makushita #7; 3–4	East Makushita #10; 2–5	West Makushita #21; 3–4	West Makushita #28; 4–3	West Makushita #24; 4–3	West Makushita #19; 4–3
2020	West Makushita #14; 2–5	East Makushita #31; 1–6	East Sandanme #5; Tournament Cancelled; 0–0–0	East Sandanme #5; 1–2–4	East Sandanme #36; 4–3	West Sandanme #19; 3–4
2021	West Sandanme #35; 3–4	East Sandanme #50; 3–4	West Sandanme #62; 3–4	East Sandanme #77; 6–1	East Sandanme #20; Retired –	x
Record given as wins–losses–absences Top division champion Top division runner-up Retired Lower divisions Non-participation Sanshō key: F=Fighting spirit; O=Outstanding performance; T=Technique Also shown: ★=Kinboshi; P=Playoff(s); Divisions: Makuuchi — Jūryō — Makushita — Sandanme — Jonidan — Jonokuchi Makuuchi ranks: Yokozuna — Ōzeki — Sekiwake — Komusubi — Maegashira

== See also ==
- List of sumo tournament second division champions
- Glossary of sumo terms
- List of past sumo wrestlers
