= Kyokunankai Hiromitsu =

Japanese sumo wrestler

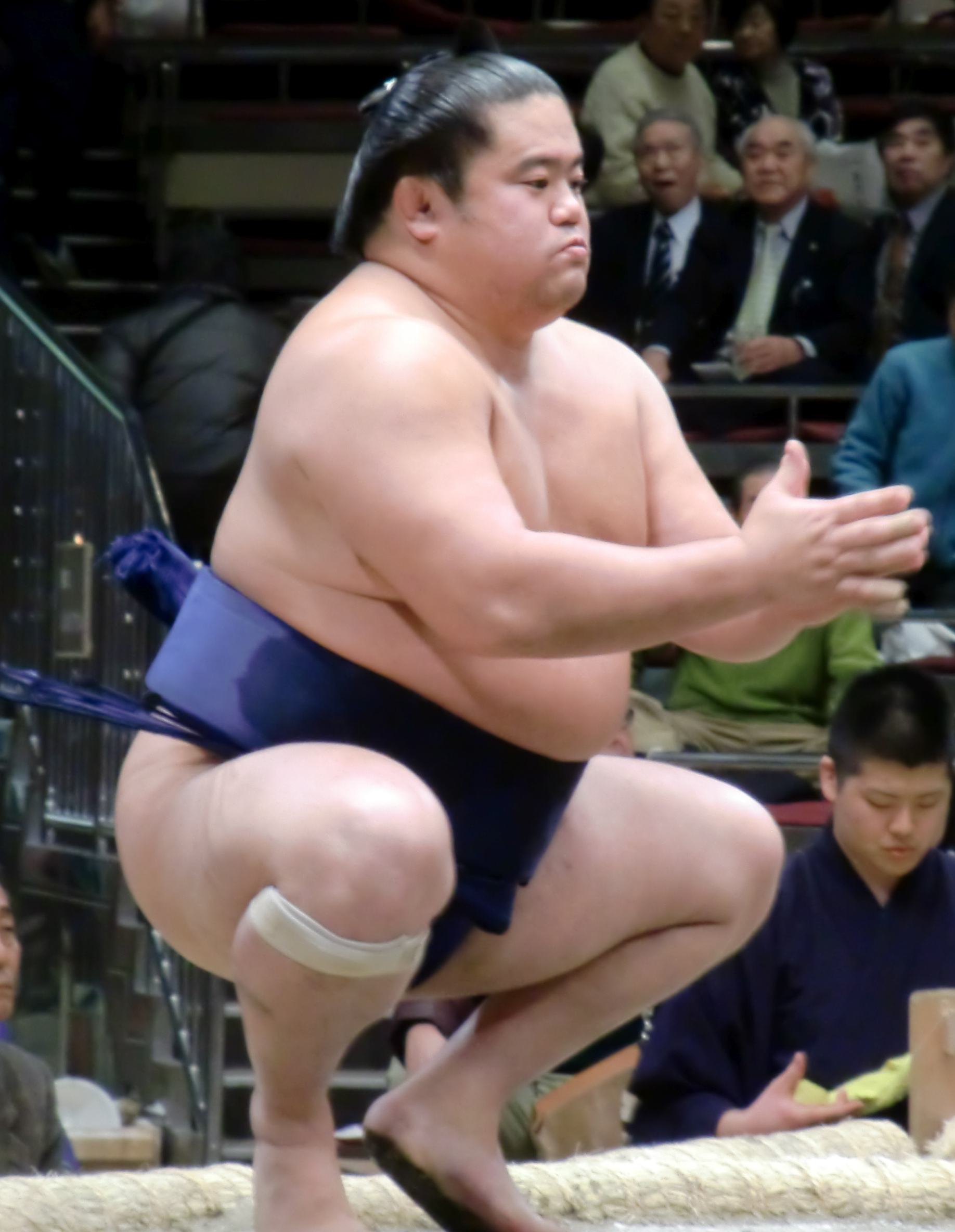

Personal information
- Native name: 旭南海 廣光
- Born: Hirokazu Ken; 14 December 1977 (age 48) Amagi, Kagoshima
- Height: 1.80 m (5 ft 11 in)
- Weight: 137 kg (302 lb)

Sport
- Sport: Sumo
- Retired: May, 2011
- Heya: Ōshima
- Record: 512-493-9
- Debut: March, 1993
- Highest rank: Maegashira 16 (September, 2010)
- Championships: 1 (Makushita)
- Updated on Sep. 2012

Kyokunankai Hiromitsu (born 14 December 1977 as Hirokazu Ken) is a former sumo wrestler from Amagi, Kagoshima, Japan. He made his professional debut in March 1993 and reached the top division in September 2010. The 17 years it took him to reach the top division is the second slowest progress ever, in the history of professional sumo wrestling. His highest rank was maegashira 16. He was forced to retire by the Japan Sumo Association, as a result of the 2011 match-fixing scandal.

== Career ==
He joined Oshima stable from junior high school, having met in 1992 a wrestler at the stable, Kyokudōzan, who was from the nearby town of Tokunoshima. He made his professional debut in March 1993, fighting under his real surname of Ken. In May 1995 he adopted a formal shikona of Kyokunankai. Weighing less than 100 kg (220 lb), he rose slowly up the ranks, not reaching the third highest makushita division until 1999. It took him another six years to win his first yusho or tournament championship in the division, which came in March 2005 with a 6–1 record. After another 6–1 record in the following tournament in May he finally became a sekitori and was promoted to the jūryō division. In March 2006 he scored ten wins in a tournament for the first time and reached a new highest rank of jūryō 2, but reaching the top division still proved beyond him as he could score only 4–11 in the following tournament. After some mediocre results he fell back to the makushita division in January 2008 but made an immediate return to jūryō after just one tournament's absence.

In July 2010 he earned promotion to the top makuuchi division for the first time. His record of 10–5 at the low rank of jūryō 12 would not under normal circumstances have been enough to win promotion, but due to six makuuchi wrestlers (Toyonoshima, Miyabiyama, Toyohibiki, Goeido, Okinoumi and Wakakoyu) being suspended from the tournament because of a baseball betting scandal and being demoted, there were a large number of vacancies on the banzuke for the Sumo Association to fill. It had taken Kyokunankai 105 tournaments from his professional debut to reach the top division, which is the second slowest in sumo history after fellow Kagoshima Prefecture native Hoshiiwato. Kyokunankai scored only four wins against eleven losses in his makuuchi debut from the rank of maegashira 16, and was demoted back to jūryō.

== Retirement from sumo ==
Kyokunankai last competed on the dohyo in the January 2011 tournament. Following this tournament he was one of 22 wrestlers identified after an investigation by the Sumo Association as being guilty of match-fixing and was ordered to retire. Kyokunankai denied involvement but nonetheless handed in his retirement papers on April 5, 2011 (ensuring that he would retain his retirement benefits and avoid being formally expelled). On April 28 he was invited by Antonio Inoki of the IGF professional wrestling organization to visit the GENOME 15 event, but he decided not to participate, declaring that he would move to his wife's parents home in Fukuoka.

== Fighting style ==
Kyokunankai was a yotsu-sumo wrestler, preferring grappling techniques to pushing or thrusting. His favoured grip on his opponent's mawashi was hidari-yotsu, a right hand outside, left hand inside position. His most common winning kimarite was yori-kiri, a straightforward force out.

== Career record ==
Kyokunankai Hiromitsu
Year	January Hatsu basho, Tokyo	March Haru basho, Osaka	May Natsu basho, Tokyo	July Nagoya basho, Nagoya	September Aki basho, Tokyo	November Kyūshū basho, Fukuoka
1993	x	(Maezumo)	West Jonokuchi #9; 3–4	East Jonokuchi #16; 4–3	West Jonidan #171; 3–4	East Jonokuchi #6; 5–2
1994	East Jonidan #136; 4–3	West Jonidan #107; 3–4	East Jonidan #126; Sat out due to injury 0–0–7	West Jonidan #196; 6–1	East Jonidan #94; 5–2	East Jonidan #44; 4–3
1995	East Jonidan #21; 4–3	West Jonidan #1; 1–6	East Jonidan #41; 3–4	West Jonidan #57; 5–2	West Jonidan #20; 4–3	East Sandanme #99; 2–5
1996	West Jonidan #32; 3–4	East Jonidan #54; 5–2	East Jonidan #11; 4–3	East Sandanme #90; 5–2	East Sandanme #57; 3–4	East Sandanme #73; 1–6
1997	West Jonidan #15; 5–2	West Sandanme #81; 4–3	East Sandanme #65; 4–3	West Sandanme #46; 4–3	West Sandanme #33; 1–6	West Sandanme #65; 3–4
1998	West Sandanme #77; 1–6	West Jonidan #11; 4–3	East Sandanme #93; 5–2	East Sandanme #59; 4–3	West Sandanme #39; 5–2	East Sandanme #13; 3–4
1999	West Sandanme #27; 5–2	West Makushita #60; 3–4	East Sandanme #16; 2–5	West Sandanme #35; 5–2	East Sandanme #8; 5–2	East Makushita #48; 4–3
2000	West Makushita #39; 4–3	West Makushita #31; 4–3	West Makushita #26; 2–5	West Makushita #42; 1–6	East Sandanme #10; 4–3	West Makushita #58; 4–3
2001	East Makushita #49; 6–1	East Makushita #24; 4–3	West Makushita #20; 1–6	West Makushita #42; 3–4	East Makushita #58; 5–2	East Makushita #37; 5–2
2002	East Makushita #21; 2–5	East Makushita #37; 3–4	East Makushita #45; 3–4	East Makushita #54; 6–1–PP	East Makushita #24; 3–4	East Makushita #32; 4–3
2003	East Makushita #24; 4–3	East Makushita #19; 5–2	West Makushita #10; 3–4	West Makushita #16; 2–5	West Makushita #33; 4–3	West Makushita #27; 4–3
2004	West Makushita #20; 3–4	West Makushita #27; 4–3	East Makushita #21; 4–3	East Makushita #16; 5–2	West Makushita #9; 4–3	East Makushita #6; 5–2
2005	East Makushita #2; 3–5	East Makushita #9; 6–1–PP; Champion	West Makushita #2; 6–1	East Jūryō #12; 8–7	East Jūryō #9; 7–8	West Jūryō #9; 6–9
2006	East Jūryō #11; 9–6	West Jūryō #6; 10–5	West Jūryō #2; 4–11	West Jūryō #9; 6–9	West Jūryō #13; 8–7	West Jūryō #12; 9–6
2007	West Jūryō #8; 6–9	West Jūryō #11; 6–9	West Jūryō #14; 8–7	East Jūryō #11; 7–8	West Jūryō #12; 7–8	West Jūryō #13; 6–9
2008	East Makushita #1; 5–2	East Jūryō #11; 8–7	East Jūryō #8; 7–8	West Jūryō #9; 9–6	West Jūryō #5; 7–8	East Jūryō #6; 9–6
2009	West Jūryō #2; 4–11	West Jūryō #10; 8–7	West Jūryō #8; 8–7	East Jūryō #6; 6–9	East Jūryō #10; 8–5–2	East Jūryō #7; 6–9
2010	East Jūryō #12; 9–6	East Jūryō #7; 6–9	West Jūryō #9; 6–9	West Jūryō #12; 10–5	East Maegashira #16; 4–11	East Jūryō #5; 10–5
2011	West Jūryō #1; 5–10	Tournament Cancelled; 0–0–0	East Jūryō #6; Retired –	x	x	x
Record given as wins–losses–absences Top division champion Top division runner-up Retired Lower divisions Non-participation Sanshō key: F=Fighting spirit; O=Outstanding performance; T=Technique Also shown: ★=Kinboshi; P=Playoff(s); Divisions: Makuuchi — Jūryō — Makushita — Sandanme — Jonidan — Jonokuchi Makuuchi ranks: Yokozuna — Ōzeki — Sekiwake — Komusubi — Maegashira

== See also ==
- Glossary of sumo terms
- List of past sumo wrestlers
