= 2011 in sumo =

The following are the events in professional sumo during 2011.

== Tournaments ==
=== Hatsu basho ===
Ryogoku Kokugikan, Tokyo, 9 January – 23 January

2011 Hatsu basho results - Makuuchi Division
W		L		A	East		Rank	West			W		L		A
14	-	1	-	0	(Mongolia)	**Hakuhō**	Y	ø							
9	-	6	-	0	(Japan)	**Kaiō**	O		(Estonia)	**Baruto**	9	-	6	-	0
10	-	5	-	0	(Bulgaria)	**Kotoōshū**	O		(Mongolia)	**Harumafuji**	8	-	7	-	0
10	-	5	-	0	(Japan)	**Kisenosato**	S		(Japan)	**Kotoshōgiku**	11	-	4	-	0
6	-	9	-	0	(Japan)	Tochiōzan	K		(Mongolia)	**Kakuryū**	8	-	7	-	0
8	-	7	-	0	(Japan)	**Toyonoshima**	M1		(Japan)	Aminishiki	6	-	9	-	0
4	-	11	-	0	(Georgia (country))	Tochinoshin	M2		(Japan)	Yoshikaze	4	-	11	-	0
5	-	10	-	0	(Russia)	Aran	M3		(Mongolia)	Tamawashi	5	-	10	-	0
8	-	7	-	0	(Japan)	**Hōmashō**	M4		(Mongolia)	**Tokusegawa**	9	-	6	-	0
11	-	4	-	0	(Japan)	**Gōeidō**	M5		(Mongolia)	Asasekiryū	6	-	9	-	0
7	-	8	-	0	(Mongolia)	Kyokutenhō	M6		(Georgia (country))	Gagamaru	5	-	10	-	0
8	-	7	-	0	(Japan)	**Takekaze**	M7		(Japan)	Tosayutaka	7	-	8	-	0
9	-	6	-	0	(Japan)	**Kitataiki**	M8		(Mongolia)	Tokitenkū	6	-	9	-	0
6	-	9	-	0	(Mongolia)	Takamisakari	M9		(Japan)	**Wakanosato**	8	-	7	-	0
6	-	9	-	0	(Japan)	Miyabiyama	M10		(Mongolia)	**Hakuba**	8	-	7	-	0
8	-	7	-	0	(Mongolia)	**Shōtenrō**	M11		(Japan)	Shimotori	2	-	13	-	0
8	-	7	-	0	(Mongolia)	**Kōryū**	M12		(Mongolia)	**Mōkonami**	8	-	7	-	0
11	-	4	-	0	(Japan)	**Okinoumi**	M13		(Japan)	**Kotokasuga**	8	-	7	-	0
9	-	6	-	0	(Japan)	**Wakakōyū**	M14		(Japan)	Kimurayama	6	-	9	-	0
3	-	12	-	0	(Georgia (country))	Kokkai	M15		(Japan)	**Toyohibiki**	9	-	6	-	0
8	-	7	-	0	(China)	**Sōkokurai**	M16		(Japan)	**Tochinonada**	9	-	6	-	0
5	-	10	-	0	(Japan)	Toyozakura	M17	ø							

ø - Indicates a pull-out or absent rank
**winning record in bold**
**Yusho Winner**

=== Haru basho ===
Osaka Prefectural Gymnasium, Osaka, 13 March – 27 March

2011 Haru basho results - Makuuchi Division
Basho cancelled for match-fixing investigation

=== Natsu basho ===
Ryogoku Kokugikan, Tokyo, 8 May – 22 May

2011 Natsu basho results - Makuuchi Division
W		L		A	East			Rank	West			W		L		A
13	-	2	-	0		(Mongolia)	**Hakuhō**	Y	ø							
3	-	8	-	4	ø	(Bulgaria)	Kotoōshū	O		(Japan)	**Kaiō**	9	-	6	-	0
10	-	5	-	0		(Estonia)	**Baruto**	O		(Mongolia)	**Harumafuji**	10	-	5	-	0
10	-	5	-	0		(Japan)	**Kotoshōgiku**	S		(Japan)	**Kisenosato**	8	-	7	-	0
12	-	3	-	0		(Mongolia)	**Kakuryū**	K		(Japan)	Toyonoshima	5	-	10	-	0
11	-	4	-	0		(Japan)	**Gōeidō**	M1	ø	(Mongolia)	Tokusegawa	0	-	0	-	0
3	-	12	-	0		(Japan)	Hōmashō	M2		(Japan)	Tochiōzan	4	-	11	-	0
3	-	12	-	0		(Japan)	Kitataiki	M3		(Japan)	Aminishiki	7	-	8	-	0
7	-	8	-	0		(Japan)	Okinoumi	M4		(Japan)	Takekaze	7	-	8	-	0
6	-	9	-	0		(Russia)	Aran	M5		(Japan)	Wakanosato	7	-	8	-	0
7	-	8	-	0		(Mongolia)	Tamawashi	M6		(Georgia (country))	**Tochinoshin**	12	-	3	-	0
0	-	0	-	0	ø	(Mongolia)	Hakuba	M7		(Japan)	**Yoshikaze**	9	-	6	-	0
8	-	7	-	0		(Mongolia)	**Kyokutenhō**	M8		(Mongolia)	Shōtenrō	4	-	11	-	0
10	-	5	-	0		(Japan)	**Tosayutaka**	M9		(Mongolia)	Asasekiryū	7	-	8	-	0
0	-	0	-	0	ø	(South Korea)	Kasugaō	M10		(Japan)	**Wakakōyū**	8	-	7	-	0
0	-	0	-	0	ø	(Mongolia)	Kōryū	M11		(South Korea)	Tochinowaka	7	-	8	-	0
0	-	0	-	0	ø	(Mongolia)	Mōkonami	M12		(Japan)	Toyohibiki	7	-	8	-	0
0	-	0	-	0	ø	(Japan)	Kotokasuga	M13		(Mongolia)	**Tokitenkū**	8	-	7	-	0
8	-	7	-	0		(Georgia (country))	**Gagamaru**	M14		(Japan)	Tochinonada	6	-	9	-	0
7	-	8	-	0		(Japan)	Takamisakari	M15	ø							
8	-	7	-	0		(Japan)	**Miyabiyama**	M16		(Brazil)	**Kaisei**	10	-	5	-	0
7	-	8	-	0		(Japan)	Kimurayama	M17	ø							

ø - Indicates a pull-out or absent rank
**winning record in bold**
**Yusho Winner**

=== Nagoya basho ===
Aichi Prefectural Gymnasium, Nagoya, 10 July – 24 July

2011 Nagoya basho results - Makuuchi Division
W		L		A	East			Rank	West			W		L		A
12	-	3	-	0		(Mongolia)	**Hakuhō**	Y	ø							
11	-	4	-	0		(Estonia)	**Baruto**	O		(Mongolia)	**Harumafuji**	14	-	1	-	0
3	-	8	-	0	ø	(Japan)	Kaiō	O		(Bulgaria)	**Kotoōshū**	9	-	6	-	0
11	-	4	-	0		(Japan)	**Kotoshōgiku**	S		(Japan)	**Kisenosato**	10	-	5	-	0
					ø			S		(Mongolia)	**Kakuryū**	10	-	5	-	0
5	-	10	-	0		(Japan)	Gōeidō	K		(Georgia (country))	Tochinoshin	6	-	9	-	0
0	-	4	-	11	ø	(Japan)	Tosayutaka	M1		(Japan)	Yoshikaze	7	-	8	-	0
2	-	13	-	0		(Mongolia)	Kyokutenhō	M2		(Japan)	**Toyonoshima**	9	-	6	-	0
5	-	10	-	0		(Japan)	Wakakōyū	M3		(Japan)	Aminishiki	2	-	13	-	0
8	-	7	-	0		(Japan)	**Okinoumi**	M4		(Japan)	**Takekaze**	8	-	7	-	0
6	-	9	-	0		(Brazil)	Kaisei	M5		(Japan)	**Wakanosato**	9	-	6	-	0
5	-	10	-	0		(Mongolia)	Tamawashi	M6		(Russia)	**Aran**	10	-	5	-	0
8	-	7	-	0		(Mongolia)	**Tokitenkū**	M7		(Georgia (country))	Gagamaru	5	-	10	-	0
10	-	5	-	0		(Japan)	**Tochiōzan**	M8		(Japan)	**Miyabiyama**	8	-	7	-	0
11	-	4	-	0		(Japan)	**Hōmashō**	M9		(Mongolia)	Asasekiryū	6	-	9	-	0
7	-	8	-	0		(Japan)	Kitataiki	M10		(Japan)	Takarafuji	4	-	11	-	0
9	-	6	-	0		(Japan)	**Takayasu**	M11		(South Korea)	**Tochinowaka**	8	-	7	-	0
6	-	9	-	0		(Japan)	Daidō	M12		(Japan)	**Toyohibiki**	8	-	7	-	0
8	-	7	-	0		(Japan)	**Sagatsukasa**	M13		(Mongolia)	Shōtenrō	7	-	8	-	0
3	-	12	-	0		(Japan)	Takamisakari	M14		(Japan)	Tochinonada	6	-	9	-	0
10	-	5	-	0		(Japan)	**Fujiazuma**	M15		(Japan)	Kimurayama	7	-	8	-	0

ø - Indicates a pull-out or absent rank
**winning record in bold**
**Yusho Winner**

=== Aki basho ===
Ryogoku Kokugikan, Tokyo, 11 September – 25 September

2011 Aki basho results - Makuuchi Division
W		L		A	East			Rank	West			W		L		A
13	-	2	-	0		(Mongolia)	**Hakuhō**	Y	ø							
8	-	7	-	0		(Mongolia)	**Harumafuji**	O		(Estonia)	**Baruto**	10	-	5	-	0
					ø			O	ø	(Bulgaria)	Kotoōshū	1	-	6	-	8
12	-	3	-	0		(Japan)	**Kotoshōgiku**	S		(Japan)	**Kisenosato**	12	-	3	-	0
9	-	6	-	0		(Mongolia)	**Kakuryū**	S	ø							
8	-	7	-	0		(Japan)	**Toyonoshima**	K		(Russia)	Aran	5	-	10	-	0
10	-	5	-	0		(Japan)	**Hōmashō**	M1		(Japan)	**Okinoumi**	8	-	7	-	0
4	-	11	-	0		(Japan)	Wakanosato	M2		(Japan)	Yoshikaze	6	-	9	-	0
5	-	10	-	0		(Japan)	Takekaze	M3		(Japan)	Tochiōzan	7	-	8	-	0
8	-	7	-	0		(Georgia (country))	**Tochinoshin**	M4		(Mongolia)	Tokitenkū	6	-	9	-	0
7	-	8	-	0		(Japan)	Miyabiyama	M5		(Japan)	**Gōeidō**	10	-	5	-	0
6	-	9	-	0		(Japan)	Takayasu	M6		(Japan)	Wakakōyū	6	-	9	-	0
6	-	9	-	0		(Japan)	Fujiazuma	M7		(South Korea)	**Tochinowaka**	9	-	6	-	0
4	-	11	-	0		(Brazil)	Kaisei	M8		(Japan)	Toyohibiki	6	-	9	-	0
2	-	3	-	10	ø	(Japan)	Masunoyama	M9		(Japan)	Sagatsukasa	6	-	9	-	0
6	-	9	-	0		(Mongolia)	Tamawashi	M10		(Mongolia)	**Kyokutenhō**	11	-	4	-	0
10	-	5	-	0		(Japan)	**Kitataiki**	M11		(Georgia (country))	**Gagamaru**	11	-	4	-	0
10	-	5	-	0		(Japan)	**Aminishiki**	M12		(Mongolia)	Asasekiryū	7	-	8	-	0
5	-	10	-	0		(Japan)	Yoshiazuma	M13		(Japan)	Tamaasuka	4	-	11	-	0
4	-	11	-	0		(Japan)	Tosayutaka	M14		(Mongolia)	**Shōtenrō**	9	-	6	-	0
8	-	7	-	0		(Japan)	**Daidō**	M15		(Czech Republic)	Takanoyama	5	-	10	-	0
9	-	6	-	0		(Georgia (country))	**Kokkai**	M16		(Japan)	Kimurayama	7	-	8	-	0
5	-	10	-	0		(Japan)	Hochiyama	M17	ø							

ø - Indicates a pull-out or absent rank
**winning record in bold**
**Yusho Winner**

=== Kyushu basho ===
Fukuoka International Centre, Kyushu, 13 November – 27 November

2011 Kyushu basho results - Makuuchi Division
W		L		A	East			Rank	West			W		L		A
14	-	1	-	0		(Mongolia)	**Hakuhō**	Y	ø							
11	-	4	-	0		(Estonia)	**Baruto**	O		(Mongolia)	**Harumafuji**	8	-	7	-	0
9	-	6	-	0		(Bulgaria)	**Kotoōshū**	O		(Japan)	**Kotoshōgiku**	11	-	4	-	0
10	-	5	-	0		(Japan)	**Kisenosato**	S		(Mongolia)	**Kakuryū**	10	-	5	-	0
8	-	7	-	0		(Japan)	**Toyonoshima**	K		(Japan)	Hōmashō	4	-	11	-	0
7	-	8	-	0		(Japan)	Okinoumi	M1		(Japan)	Gōeidō	7	-	8	-	0
2	-	13	-	0		(Georgia (country))	Tochinoshin	M2		(Mongolia)	Kyokutenhō	4	-	11	-	0
4	-	11	-	0		(Russia)	Aran	M3		(Georgia (country))	Gagamaru	2	-	13	-	0
7	-	8	-	0		(South Korea)	Tochinowaka	M4	ø	(Japan)	Tochiōzan	5	-	6	-	4
8	-	7	-	0		(Japan)	**Kitataiki**	M5		(Japan)	Yoshikaze	7	-	8	-	0
9	-	6	-	0		(Japan)	**Aminishiki**	M6		(Japan)	**Miyabiyama**	11	-	4	-	0
6	-	9	-	0		(Mongolia)	Tokitenkū	M7		(Japan)	**Takekaze**	10	-	5	-	0
0	-	0	-	15	ø	(Mongolia)	Shōtenrō	M8		(Japan)	**Takayasu**	9	-	6	-	0
2	-	4	-	9	ø	(Japan)	Wakanosato	M9		(Japan)	**Wakakōyū**	12	-	3	-	0
1	-	14	-	0		(Georgia (country))	Kokkai	M10		(Japan)	Fujiazuma	7	-	8	-	0
9	-	6	-	0		(Japan)	**Toyohibiki**	M11		(Japan)	**Myōgiryū**	10	-	5	-	0
8	-	7	-	0		(Japan)	**Daidō**	M12		(Japan)	Sagatsukasa	6	-	9	-	0
5	-	10	-	0		(Mongolia)	Tamawashi	M13		(Mongolia)	Asasekiryū	6	-	9	-	0
6	-	9	-	0		(Brazil)	Kaisei	M14		(Japan)	Takarafuji	5	-	10	-	0
10	-	5	-	0		(Japan)	**Shōhōzan**	M15		(Japan)	**Sadanofuji**	8	-	7	-	0
11	-	4	-	0		(Bulgaria)	**Aoiyama**	M16		(Japan)	Tsurugidake	4	-	11	-	0
4	-	11	-	0		(Japan)	Kimurayama	M17	ø							

ø - Indicates a pull-out or absent rank
**winning record in bold**
**Yusho Winner**

== News ==
=== January ===
- 23: Hakuho wins the first honbasho of the year. It is his eighteenth championship, and his sixth in a row, a feat only previously achieved by Taiho and Asashoryu. His only defeat is to Kisenosato, who also beat the yokozuna in the previous tournament and once again wins the Outstanding Performance Prize. Kotoshogiku and Okinoumi finish runners-up to Hakuho on 11–4 and are awarded Technique and Fighting Spirit prizes respectively. Goeido also finishes on 11–4. The jūryō championship is won by Kasugao, and the makushita title by Matsutani, returning from suspension. Former maegashira Kasuganishiki announces his retirement. He will stay in the sumo world as an elder under the name Takenawa Oyakata.
- 23: Kiriyama stable shuts down, with its wrestlers moving to Asahiyama stable.
- 24: Georgian wrestlers Kokkai and Gagamaru are reprimanded by the Japan Sumo Association after allegedly damaging an Indian restaurant after a night of drinking following the sixth day of the Hatsu tournament.
- 26: Three former wrestlers from the Ōnomatsu stable are arrested in connection with illegal gambling on professional baseball.
- 27: The Sumo Association issues a warning to Tamawashi after he leaned against and broke the window of a restaurant in Tokyo after the last day of the Hatsu basho. He had been drinking, and the accident caused an injury to his right arm which kept him out of action for three weeks.
- 29: The danpatsu-shiki or official retirement ceremony of former komusubi Kaiho (Tanigawa Oyakata) takes place at the Kokugikan.

=== February ===
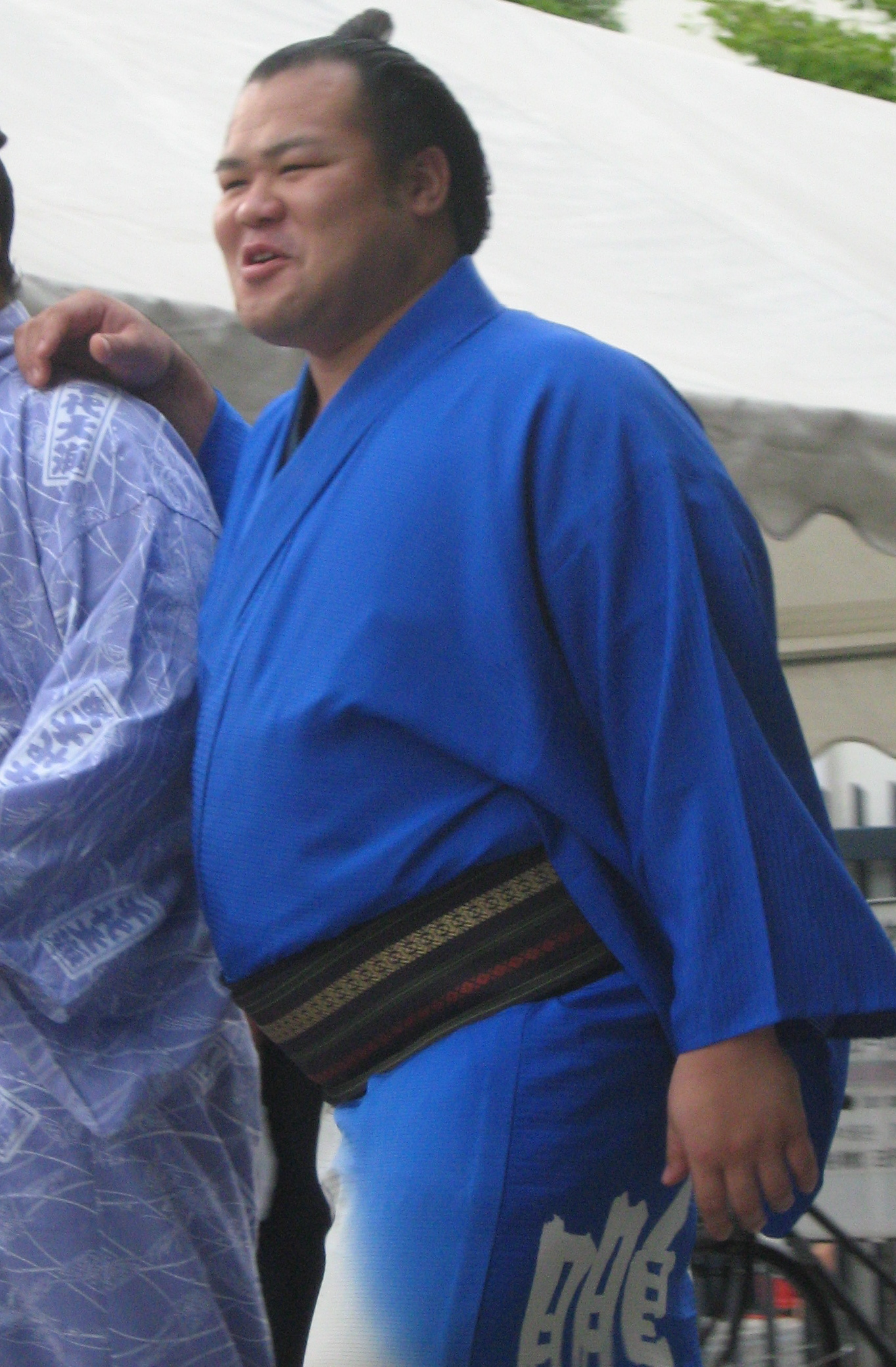
Chiyohakuho admitted in February to throwing bouts.

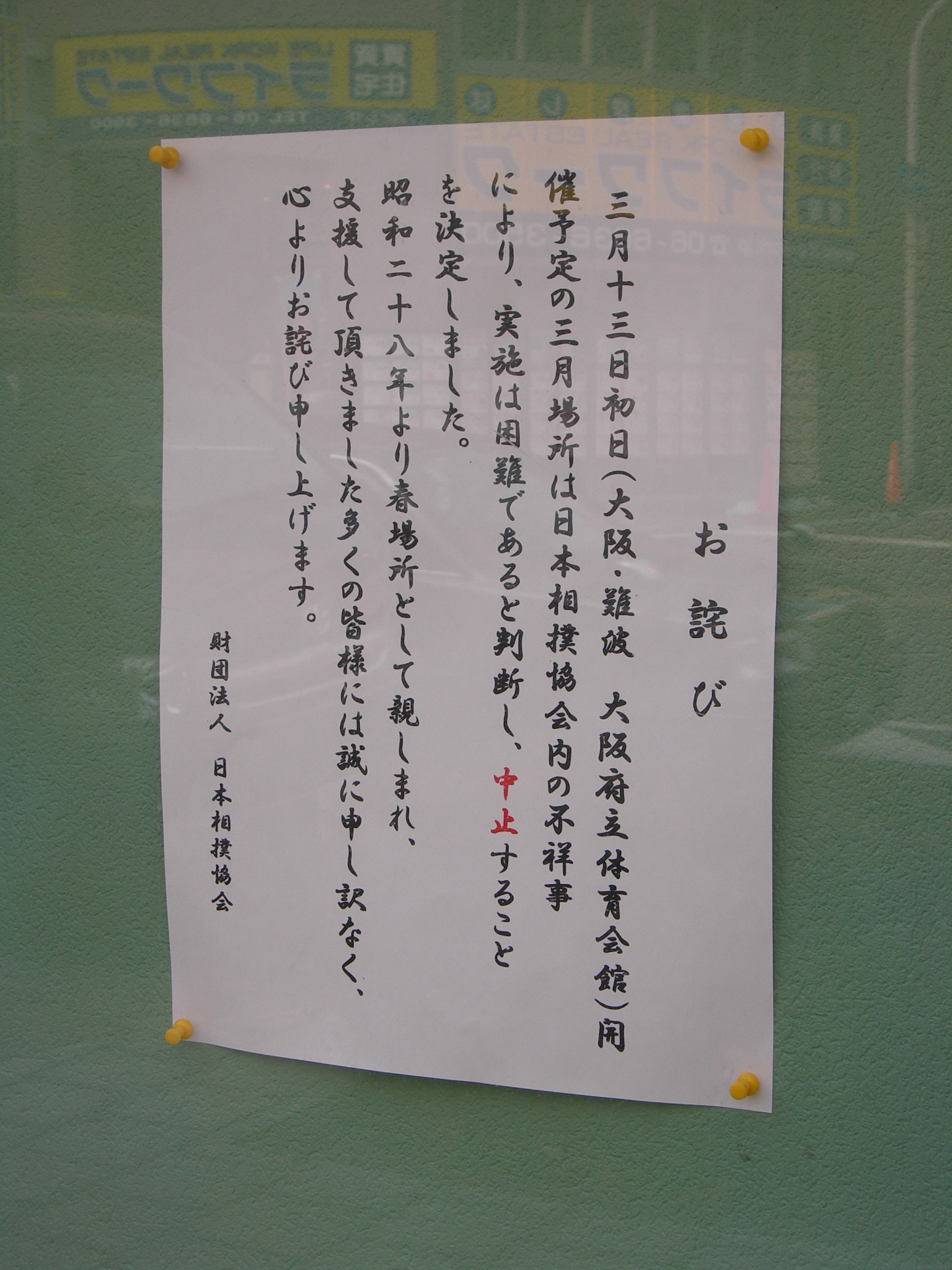
Flyer announcing that the Sumo Association has decided to cancel the March tournament in Osaka.

- 2: It becomes public that police last May investigating the baseball betting scandal found evidence of match fixing of sumo bouts, known as yaocho, from mobile phones belonging to jūryō wrestlers Kasuganishiki and Chiyohakuho. Leaked to the media are a series of text messages between Kasuganishiki and Kiyoseumi, with the low ranker Enatsukasa acting as a go-between. They discuss trading cash for wins and how to orchestrate the matches, with Kiyoseumi saying of one bout, "Hit me hard at the tachi-ai and just go with the flow." Also mentioned in the messages are Kaiho (Tanigawa Oyakata), Shimotori, Shotenro, Koryu, Toyozakura, Kyokunankai, Wakatenro, Shirononami, and Yamamotoyama. Twelve of the wrestlers are summoned to the Sumo Association headquarters to explain themselves. Chairman Hanaregoma tells a press conference that this questioning did not uncover any conclusive evidence but he promises severe punishments to those proven to be involved.
- 3: Sports minister Yoshiaki Takaki tells the Diet that three people in the sumo world have admitted their involvement in bout rigging. They are Chiyohakuho, Enatsukasa and the now-retired Kasuganishiki (Takenawa Oyakata). Kiyoseumi denies any wrongdoing. During these interviews Kirinowaka's name is mentioned, bringing the number of wrestlers involved to 14. The Japanese Prime Minister Naoto Kan calls the scandal a "betrayal" of the Japanese public. At stake is the Sumo Association's future as a government affiliated entity with tax benefits, as this is up for renewal. NHK announces that it will not hold the 44th Annual Charity Ozumo tournament scheduled for February 11, and is considering dropping TV coverage of the March honbasho. Fuji TV is also scrapping its 1-day tournament on February 6. A Ministry of Education official, Kan Suzuki, insists the Sumo Association conduct a thorough investigation, saying "Holding the scheduled sumo tournament in March will not gain the public's support unless the association uncovers every detail." An independent panel of seven figures from outside sumo has been set up and will report its findings to the Sumo Association.
- 5: It is reported that the Sumo Association has decided to cancel the March tournament in Osaka. This will be the first time since 1946 (when the bomb-damaged Kokugikan was undergoing renovation) that a honbasho has been called off. A regional exhibition tournament in Akita Prefecture on August 8 has also been cancelled.
- 6: Cancellation of the Haru basho is confirmed by Hanaregoma, who tells reporters "We cannot, and should not hold the tournament under these circumstances. Until we can completely root out corruption in the sport, we cannot appear in the sumo ring." He also announces the scrapping of all regional tours (jungyo) for the year. The head of the investigative panel, Waseda University professor Shigeru Ito, says that questionnaires distributed to members of the Sumo Association have not led to anyone else confessing involvement, but that the 14 wrestlers under suspicion have been asked to surrender their mobile phones and bank account details for analysis. Ito stresses that the panel will thoroughly investigate without regard for the scheduling of tournaments, which could also put May's Natsu honbasho in Tokyo in doubt.
- 8: Sports minister Takaki requests that wrestlers co-operate fully with investigators, after reports that some of the 14 who have been asked to hand over their mobile phones have claimed that they are either broken or have been replaced by new ones.
- 14: Kodansha, publishers of the tabloid weekly Shukan Gendai, demand compensation from the Sumo Association for lost court cases in 2007 over articles that alleged match-fixing, in which they had to pay 8.25 million yen in damages.
- 15: Police submit requests to the Tokyo District Prosecutors' Office for charges to be brought against two jūryō wrestlers, Shironoryu and Daido, and seven other people, for allegedly taking part in an illegal baseball gambling ring.
- 17: An independent panel of 11 sumo outsiders, formed last year to look at ways to improve the Sumo Association's governance, delivers its report. It does not mention the current match-fixing scandal, but recommends banning the trading of toshiyori elder names, reducing the number of stables from the present 50 to around 30, issuing contracts with each stable for the education of its young wrestlers, and having outsiders make up about half the Association's 12 man executive board. It criticised the current practice of allowing stablemasters to serve as board members, saying, "It is inappropriate that the people who are being supervised are those doing the supervising."
- 28: Instead of a traditional banzuke, the Sumo Association releases a simple document indicating the rankings of the wrestlers on their performances in the January tournament, to be used for calculating salary and other allowances. Only the positions of the sekitori are released to the media. Chiyohakuho and Kiyoseumi are both listed in the jūryō division.

=== March ===
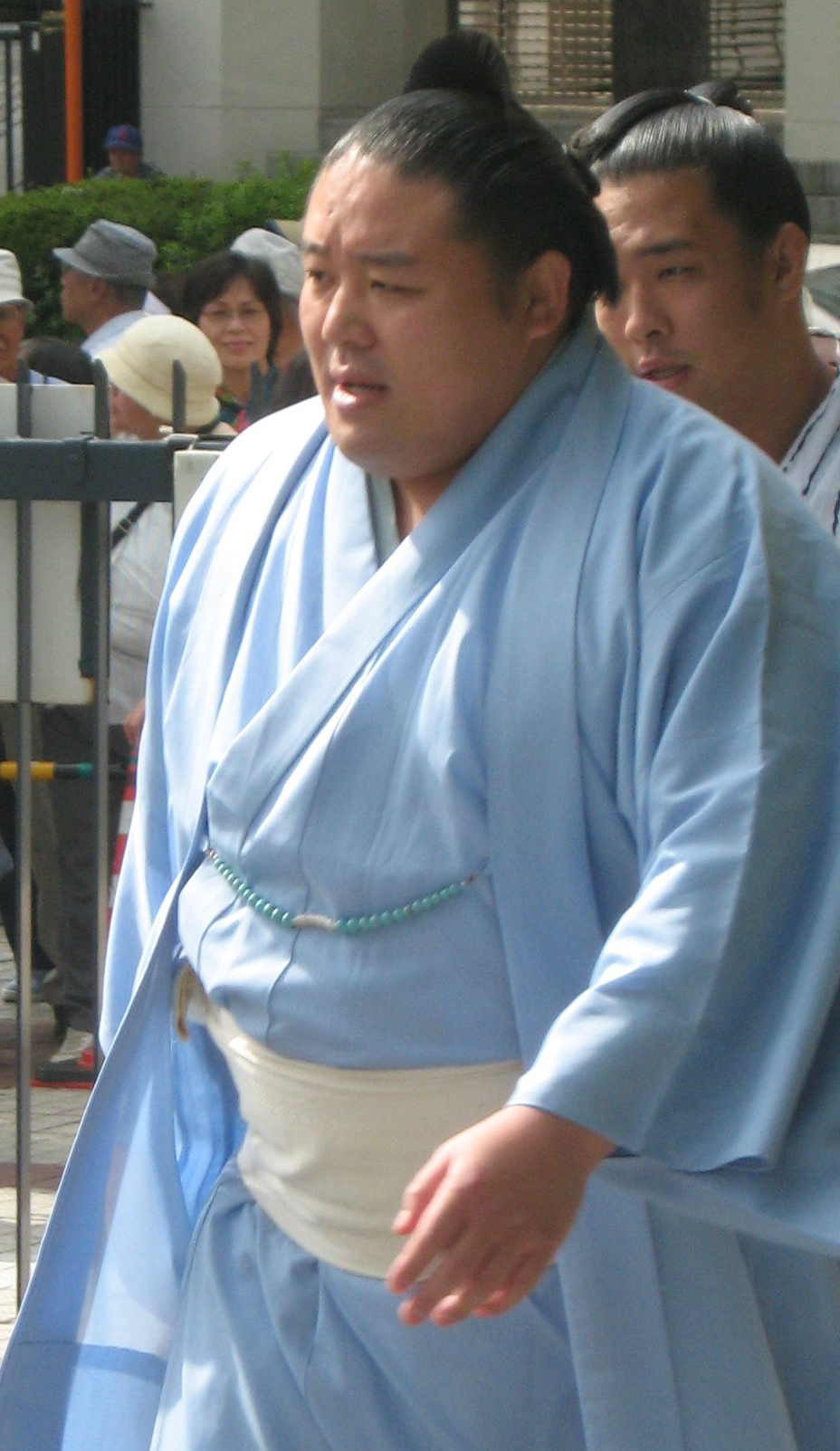
Ex-Kasuganishiki's testimony was crucial to the investigative panel

- 2: The Mainichi Daily News reports that Takenawa Oyakata (ex Kasuganishiki) has claimed that about 40 other wrestlers were involved in the match-fixing scam, and that he first became exposed to yaocho in January 2006 when a sanyaku wrestler asked him to throw a bout. He refused on that occasion, but later became involved when injuries sent him down to jūryō.
- 4:
  - The Metropolitan Police Department concludes its investigation into the illegal baseball affair by reporting 30 people to prosecutors, including 16 active wrestlers such as Toyonoshima and Miyabiyama, as well as the dismissed Kotomitsuki and Otake Oyakata.
  - Shigeru Ito's fact-finding panel has determined that at least 20 wrestlers and coaches are highly likely to have been involved in match-fixing. Most are believed to be lower makuuchi and higher jūryō level wrestlers and do not include the very highest ranked. In addition to the names that surfaced last month, jūryō Asofuji and Masatsukasa are suspected as being regularly involved in trading wins and losses.
- 5: There are just 36 new recruits reporting for their physical examinations, the lowest ever entry for the month of March. The tests, normally held in Osaka, take place in Tokyo due to the cancellation of the March basho.
- 18: Prosecutors in Tokyo announce that Kotomitsuki, Otake and 25 others involved in the baseball gambling scandal will be spared indictment over gambling due to lack of implicating evidence. However, they are filing summary charges against nine others, including jūryō ranked Shironoryu.
- 23: The investigative panel finishes its inquiry into the match-fixing scandal, and is set to meet to decide on punishments and present its findings to the Sumo Association on April 1.
- 28: It is reported that the panel has recognised the involvement of three more wrestlers in the scandal in addition to those who have already confessed, and that around 20 people are to be either dismissed or hit with lengthy suspensions.
- 31: Three members of the Sumo Association's executive board, Kitanoumi, Kokonoe and Michinoku, will reportedly resign from their posts after the investigative panel ruled that their wrestlers were guilty of match-fixing.

=== April ===
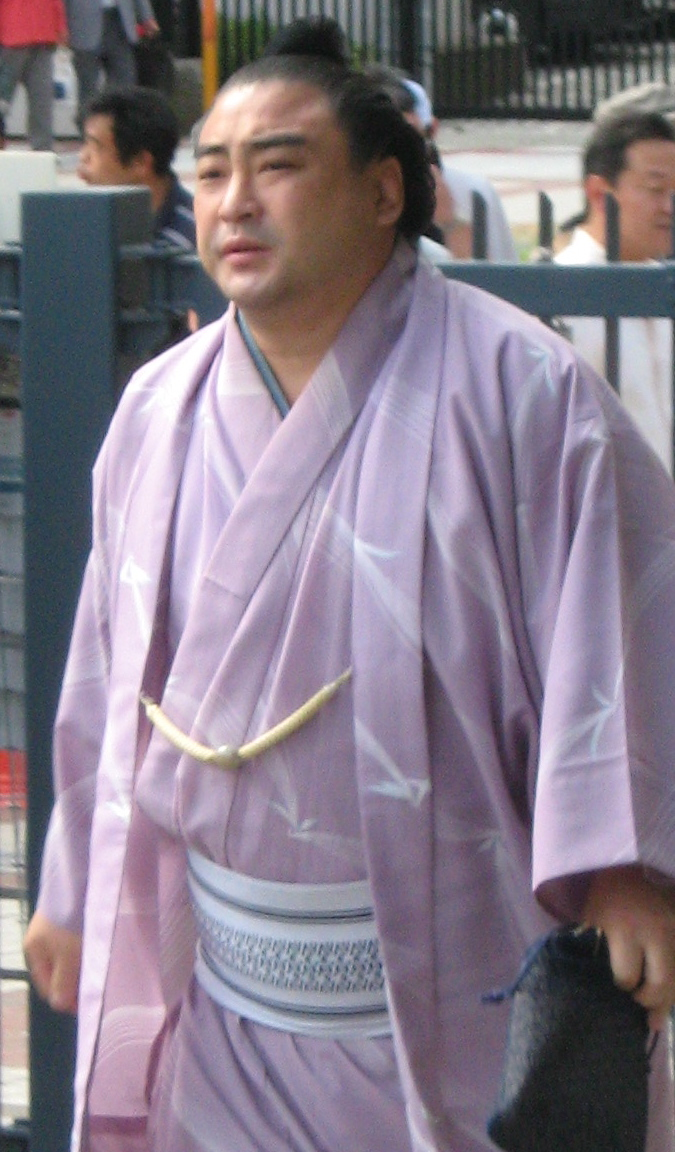
Ex-Kaiho was found guilty of match-fixing but refused to resign

- 1: The Sumo Association "advises" nineteen wrestlers to retire because of match-fixing: makuuchi-ranked Tokusegawa, Kasugao, Koryu, Hakuba, Shimotori, Kotokasuga and Mokonami, jūryō Masatsukasa, Asofuji, Sakaizawa, Wakatenro, Kiyoseumi, Toyozakura and Kyokunankai, former makuuchi Yamamotoyama and Jūmonji, and former jūryō Hoshihikari, Kirinowaka and Shirononami. Tanigawa Oyakata, (the former Kaiho), is also asked to resign but is quoted as saying, "This is absolutely ridiculous. I told the Japan Sumo Association board that the panel's investigation was full of holes. I will take legal action." Many of the other wrestlers also declare their anger at being forced to retire, with Yamamotoyama saying,"They decided without listening to my excuse," and Wakatenro protesting, "There's no way I can accept this because I'm being forced out simply because my name came up in some testimonies and text messages." They had until April 5 of that year to hand in their retirement papers, or face the even more harsh punishment of outright dismissal. Two year bans are given to those who admitted wrongdoing: Chiyohakuho, Takenawa Oyakata (ex Kasuganishiki) and sandanme ranked Enatsukasa (who acted as the go-between). However, all three have indicated they are leaving sumo completely. Enatsukasa issued an apology to sumo fans, saying "I've caused a lot of problems for the wrestlers who genuinely put in the work, and it hurts." Seventeen sumo elders are demoted, with executive members Kitanoumi, Kokonoe and Michinoku resigning from their posts and chairman Hanaregoma taking a 30 per cent pay cut for two months. Hanaregoma told a press conference, "We had to punish many people, all of whom are our colleagues. It was a very tough decision to make." About ten other wrestlers are still under investigation, meaning it is unlikely that the Natsu tournament in May will go ahead.
- 4: Mokonami, Kasugao and Kotokasuga hand in their retirement papers.
- 5:
  - With the deadline to retire set to expire at 4pm, the rest of the 23 guilty men follow suit, with the exception of Tanigawa Oyakata, who tearfully tells a press conference, "In the fourteen years I have done sumo, I have never done any yaocho. If I hand in my papers now, it will be an admission of guilt." Tanigawa says he has not yet decided whether he will sue the Sumo Association. Chairman Hanaregoma responds, "it is unfortunate but he has his own feeling on this matter."
  - Details emerge of the Sumo Association's executive board meeting on Friday. Some board members felt that suspension from upcoming tournaments would be sufficient punishment, and that "it's not right to punish all wrestlers simply by believing the testimony of just one or two wrestlers who admit to bout-rigging," but in the end the vote was 9 to 3 in favour of accepting the investigative panel's proposals. The panel reached its conclusions not just on the basis on the text messages but also on the testimony of Takenawa Oyakata, the responses of the wrestlers under suspicion and video analysis of sumo matches. Originally makuuchi Sokokurai and jūryō Hoshikaze were also on the guilty list, but their names were removed pending further investigation, and Shotenro was found not guilty.
- 6:
  - Tanigawa is fired from the Sumo Association, having refused to voluntarily resign.
  - The Sumo Association announces that there will be a tournament held in May, but it will be a "test meet" instead of a fully-fledged honbasho. The event is being held purely to decide on the wrestler's rankings for the Nagoya tournament in July. It will take place at the Kokugikan as scheduled, but admission will be free and there will be no Emperor's Cup or prize money. However, the bouts will count on the wrestlers' career records.
- 7: An eight-member committee set up last month to look at ways of preventing yaocho proposes bringing back the kosho or public injury system, abolished in 2003, which allowed wrestlers who were injured during a honbasho to sit out the next tournament without an effect on their rank.
- 11: The Sumo Association decides that Sokokurai and Hoshikaze are guilty of match fixing, and forces them both into retirement. However, both are declaring their innocence and refusing to submit their papers, saying they may take legal action. Their stablemasters, Arashio and Oguruma, are both demoted.
- 13: The deadline for Hoshikaze and Sokokurai to retire passes with both refusing to do so – the first active wrestlers in the scandal to not submit their papers. The investigative panel determined that Sokokurai took part in a fixed match with Kasuganishiki in May 2010, based on testimony by the now-Takenawa and others, while Hoshikaze was at first cleared by Takenawa's testimony but then implicated by Chiyohakuho, who testified that his bout with Hoshikaze in the most recent January 2011 tournament was rigged.
- 14: Sokokurai and Hoshikaze are both fired by the Sumo Association, and make it clear that they will take legal action – an option which none of the other 23 wrestlers punished in the match-fixing scandal have chosen. Sokokurai comments, "I have never taken part in a fixed match in the eight years that I've been in sumo. I will prove this in court", while Hoshikaze says, "I want to clearly prove in court that I didn't do it." Hoshikaze's lawyer says his client was never given an opportunity to argue his case once he was found guilty.
- 18: Onoe Oyakata, already demoted two rungs in the Sumo Association's elder hierarchy because three of his wrestlers were found guilty of match-fixing, falls asleep at the wheel while waiting at a red light and is found by police to be over the legal alcohol limit. He holds a press conference at which he says he deeply regrets what he did.
- 20: NHK confirms that it will not be broadcasting the May test meet live, nor will it show highlights.
- 25: On the day that the banzuke for the May honbasho would have been announced, yokozuna Hakuho says he has mixed feelings about the upcoming test meet, which will have no prizes: "I, more than anyone else, have the experience and feel the weight of winning the Emperor's Cup and claiming titles. This is very emotional."
- 28: The Sumo Association says it will broadcast the May test meet live on the internet, and it will also be cutting by almost half the usual amount of electricity it uses at the Kokugikan, to meet power saving measures following the March 11 earthquake.
- 29: Wrestlers work out before the Yokozuna Deliberation Council and around 1700 spectators at the Kokugikan, the first public performance of sumo since January.

=== May ===
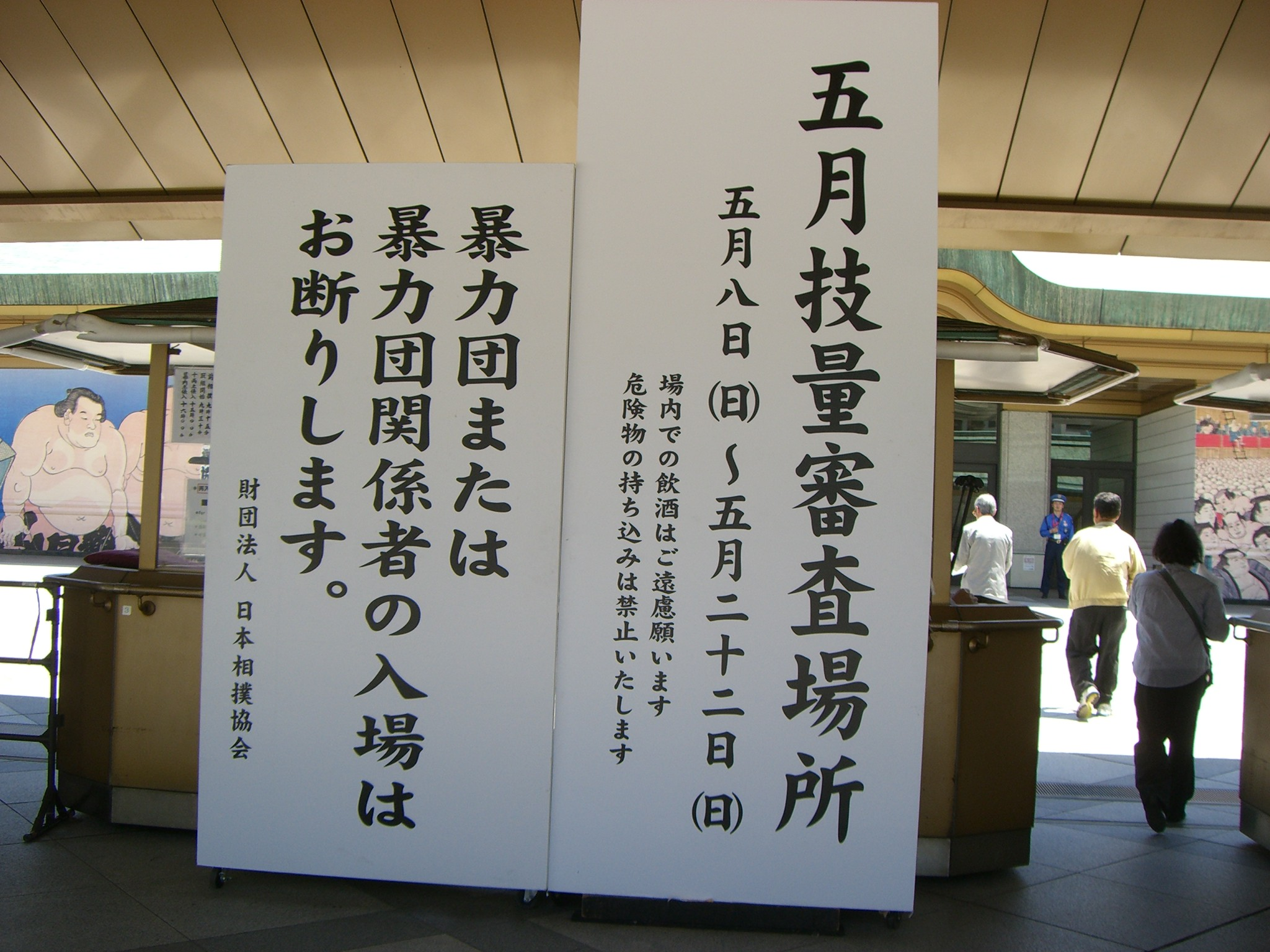
the May "technical examination" tournament

- 4: Former komusubi Futen'ō, who has fallen to the makushita division, announces his retirement from active competition at the age of 30. He will stay in sumo as a coach under the elder name Inagawa Oyakata.
- 8: The first day of the test meet attracts around 10,000 spectators. Hakuho opens his account with a win over Toyonoshima, and comments, "It has been a dark situation for a long time now. But I've gotten through with the first day of competition. I am happy I could wrestle well." Chairman Hanaregoma offers his "heartfelt condolences" to the victims of the March 11 tsunami in his opening speech, and also apologises to sumo fans for what he calls "the problem with intentional spiritless sumo."
- 22: The final day of the technical examination tournament sees Hakuho take his nineteenth championship after his only challenger, Tochinoshin, loses to Harumafuji. Hakuho subsequently loses his match to ozeki Kaio but his 13–2 record is enough for his seventh consecutive title, equalling the record held by Asashoryu. Tochinoshin finishes on 12–3 and is runner-up alongside Kakuryu. Tochinoshin shares the Fighting Spirit prize with Kaisei (who scores 10–5 in his makuuchi debut) while Kakuryu shares the Technique prize with Goeido. The jūryō yusho is won by Sagatsukasa. Among the many rikishi retiring at this tournament are former sekiwake Hokutoriki, former jūryō Daishoyama and the 44-year-old Tochitenko, the last wrestler to have fought in the old Kuramae Kokugikan which closed in 1984.
- 25: The Sumo Association announces that a postwar record of 13 rikishi are to be promoted to the jūryō division, to fill the gaps left by the many wrestlers forced to retire over match-fixing. Among the newcomers are Bulgarian Aoiyama, the Czech Takanoyama and Mongolian Arawashi. Among the returnees are former komusubi Kakizoe and former maegashira Hamanishiki. Kakizoe and Arawashi both earned promotion despite posting losing 3–4 records; the first time in the modern era that this has occurred.

=== June ===
- 11: Takashima stable, run by the former sekiwake Koboyama, shuts down and its one remaining wrestler retires.
- 27: The banzuke for the Nagoya tournament is released. The makuuchi division has been reduced to 40 wrestlers from 42, and jūryō to 26 from 28. There are four newcomers to the top division – 21-year-old Takayasu, former collegiate wrestlers Takarafuji and Daido and Tamanoi stable's Fujiazuma. Sagatsukasa also returns to the top division for the first time in 7 basho. Kakuryu joins Kisenosato and Kotoshogiku at sekiwake, making it the first time since 2005 that there are three men at sumo's third highest rank. Takamisakari and Kimurayama both find themselves at higher ranks despite only scoring 7–8 last time out. There are also no wrestlers losing sekitori status – the first time this has occurred since 1933.

=== July ===
- 14: At the Nagoya basho, Kaio wins his 1046th career match, breaking the record held by Chiyonofuji. He is congratulated by the former yokozuna after his bout.
- 19: After losing his seventh bout of the tournament to fellow ozeki Kotooshu, Kaio announces his retirement after 23 years in sumo. As well as holding the record for career wins he also won a record 879 top division matches and competed in 107 top division tournaments, 65 of them as an ozeki. He will stay in sumo as a coach at his stable under the elder name Asakayama Oyakata.
- 23: Ozeki Harumafuji defeats compatriot Hakuho to clinch his second top division championship, standing at 14–0 while Hakuho falls to 12–2. This ends his hopes of winning a record eight consecutive yusho.
- 24: On the final day of the tournament, Harumafuji loses to Kisenosato to finish on 14–1. Hakuho also loses (to Baruto) to fall to 12–3, but it is still enough to take the runner-up position. Kotoshogiku finishes on 11–4, which is not enough to get the ozeki promotion which he was hoping for, but he receives the Outstanding Performance prize for his defeat of Hakuho on Day 10. Homasho also finishes on 11–4 and receives the Fighting Spirit award. The jūryō championship goes to Myogiryu after a playoff with Masunoyama. The total attendance at the tournament was just 74,000, down 18% on last year, and the final day was the only one to attract a sell-out crowd.
- 26: Nine promotions to jūryō for September are announced, including Kimikaze, who formerly competed as Naoe and is the first graduate of Waseda University make jūryō since 1933, Mongolian Kyokushūhō, Kokonoe stable's Chiyozakura, former maegashira Satoyama, and Hokutokuni, a former jūryō rikishi who fell off the banzuke completely through injury before returning in just five tournaments.

=== August ===
- 29: The banzuke for the September basho is released. The retirement of Kaiō leaves no Japanese born wrestlers at ozeki or yokozuna for the first time since January 1993. There are three makuuchi newcomers: Masunoyama, the first wrestler from Chiganoura stable to reach makuuchi since it opened in 2004, Czech Takanoyama, whose 58 tournament rise to the top division is the second slowest for a foreigner, and Yoshiazuma, who took 93 tournaments to make makuuchi and is the second oldest top division debutant since WWII at 34 years and three months.

=== September ===
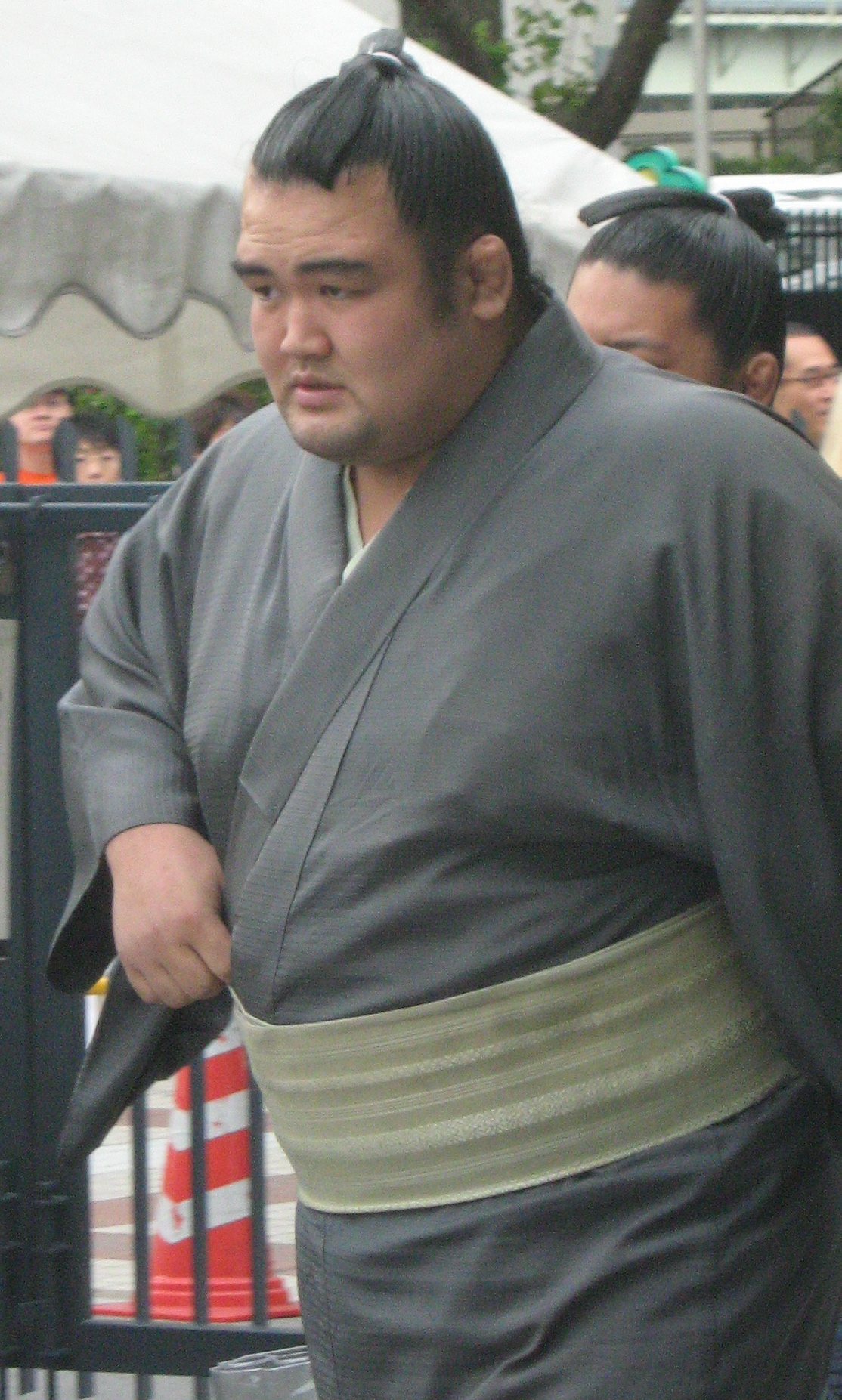
Kotoshogiku earned promotion to ozeki in September.

- 25: The Aki basho is won by Hakuho, who avoids a possible three-way playoff between himself, Kotoshogiku and Kisenosato by beating Harumafuji to finish one win ahead of the sekiwake pair on 13–2 (Harumafuji's bid for yokozuna promotion ends with a mediocre 8–7 record). Kotoshogiku is assured of ozeki promotion and gets prizes for Outstanding Performance and Technique. Kisenosato shares the Outstanding Performance prize, and gets his first ever jun-yusho or runner-up performance. He will be looking for ozeki promotion himself in November. Kakuryu, by contrast, is back to square one after scoring only 9–6. The Fighting Spirit prize goes to Gagamaru for his fine 11–4 record which included a win over ozeki Baruto. Myogiryu wins his second jūryō championship in a row, this time without the need for a playoff.
- 26: Isenoumi Oyakata, the former sekiwake Fujinokawa, turns 65 and retires. He is replaced as head coach of Isenoumi stable by former maegashira Kitakachidoki.
- 28:Kotoshogiku's promotion to ozeki is officially confirmed, the first by a Japanese wrestler since his ex-stablemate Kotomitsuki in 2007.

=== October ===
- 18: Kasugano Oyakata, the former sekiwake Tochinowaka Kiyotaka and head of Kasugano stable is severely reprimanded by the Sumo Association for beating Tochinoshin and two of his other wrestlers with a golf club after they repeatedly broke stable rules on curfews and wearing Western style clothes instead of kimono in public. Kasugano admitted responsibility and said, "I honestly think I went too far and I regret it." Instead he decides to ban Tochinoshin from keiko (training).
- 27: The Sumo Association launch an investigation into allegations made by the tabloid Shukan Shincho that Naruto Oyakata, the 58th Yokozuna Takanosato and head of Naruto stable, beat a former junior member of his stable with a block of wood and injected Takanoyama with insulin so that the barely 100 kg wrestler would increase his appetite and put on weight. Both Naruto and Takanoyama are summoned to the Ryogoku Kokugikan for questioning by Sumo Association chairman Hanaregoma.
- 31: The banzuke for the forthcoming Kyushu tournament is released. There are five rikishi making their makuuchi debuts, the most since the September 1950 tournament. They are Myogiryu, who only a year earlier was at the bottom of makushita after a four basho injury layoff, Shōhōzan (previously Matsutani), Sadanofuji, the Bulgarian Aoiyama and Tsurugidake, who finally reaches the top division at the age of 32 years 8 months. The 63 tournaments it took Tsurugidake to reach makuuchi is the slowest ever by a former amateur collegiate competitor. Myogiryu and Shohozan are also former collegiate competitors, with Myogiryu and Tsurugidake belonging to the same club, Nihon Taiiku University. There are three new jūryō wrestlers, Tokushoryu, Asahishō, and Ikioi, plus returnee Ōiwato, previously known as Kanbayashi. Also, Homasho finally makes his sanyaku debut at the age of 30 years, 6 months, making him the fourth oldest to do so since the six tournaments a year schedule began in 1958.

=== November ===
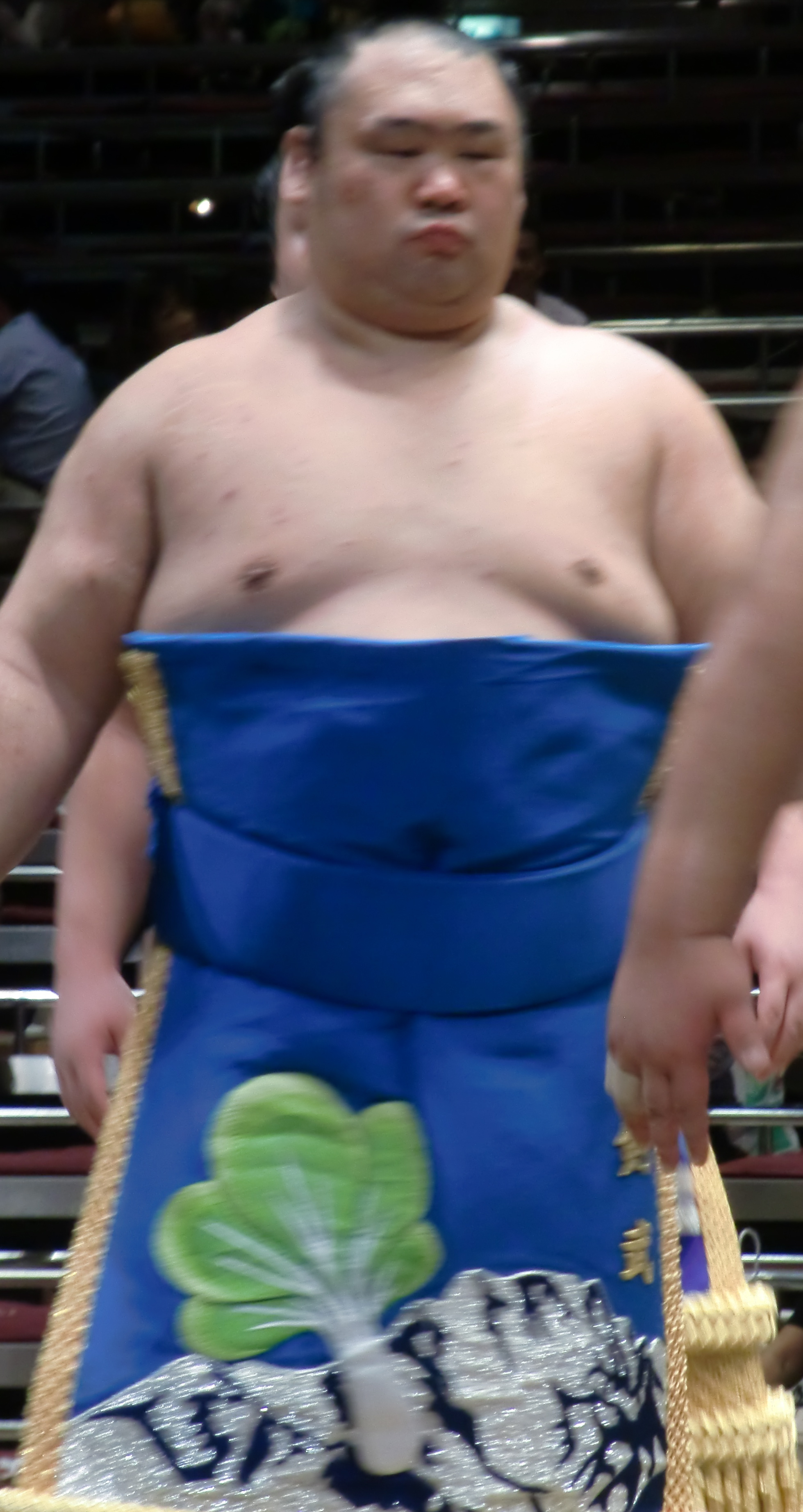
Tsurugidake was one of five men making his top division debut in November

- 7: Naruto Oyakata dies of respiratory failure in a hospital in Fukuoka at the age of 59.
- 8: The Sumo Association announce that Nishiiwa Oyakata (ex-Takanotsuru) will take over Naruto stable and that the investigation into the late Naruto's alleged actions will be dropped.
- 27: On the final day of the Kyushu tournament, Kisenosato is defeated by new ozeki Kototshogiku to finish on 10–5. However, the Sumo Association had already indicated earlier in the day that his record was good enough for ozeki promotion. He is also awarded his first Technique Prize. Yokozuna Hakuho, who wrapped up his 21st yusho on Day 13, loses his final bout to Baruto to finish on 14–1. Runner-up is rank-and-filer Wakakoyu on 12–3, who wins his first Fighting Spirit prize. He shares the award with Bulgarian Aoiyama, who scores 11–4 in his makuuchi debut. Myogiryu also has a good start to his top division career, finishing on 10–5. The jūryō championship goes to Ikioi in his debut in the division. Retiring are former sekiwake Tamanoshima, who becomes Nishiiwa Oyakata, and former jūryō division Daishoumi.
- 30:Kisenosato's promotion to ozeki is officially confirmed.

=== December ===
- 21: The banzuke for the January 2012 tournament is announced. There are four newcomers to the top division, Chiyonokuni, Tenkaiho, Kyokushuho and Nionoumi, and four jūryō debutants, the Russian Amuru, Kitaharima, Chiyotairyu and Homarefuji. Miyabiyama, the former ozeki who dropped to jūryō in 2010, returns to the sanyaku ranks after 29 tournaments away.

== Deaths ==
- 18 April: Former maegashira Wakanaruto (also former Sendagawa Oyakata), aged 72, of heart failure.
- 8 October: Former maegashira Wakasegawa, aged 49, of complications from diabetes.
- 7 November: 59th Yokozuna Takanosato (also Naruto Oyakata), aged 59, of respiratory failure.

== See also ==
- Match-fixing in professional sumo
- Glossary of sumo terms
- List of active sumo wrestlers
- List of years in sumo
- List of yokozuna
