= Kimurayama Mamoru =

Japanese sumo wrestler (1981–2024)

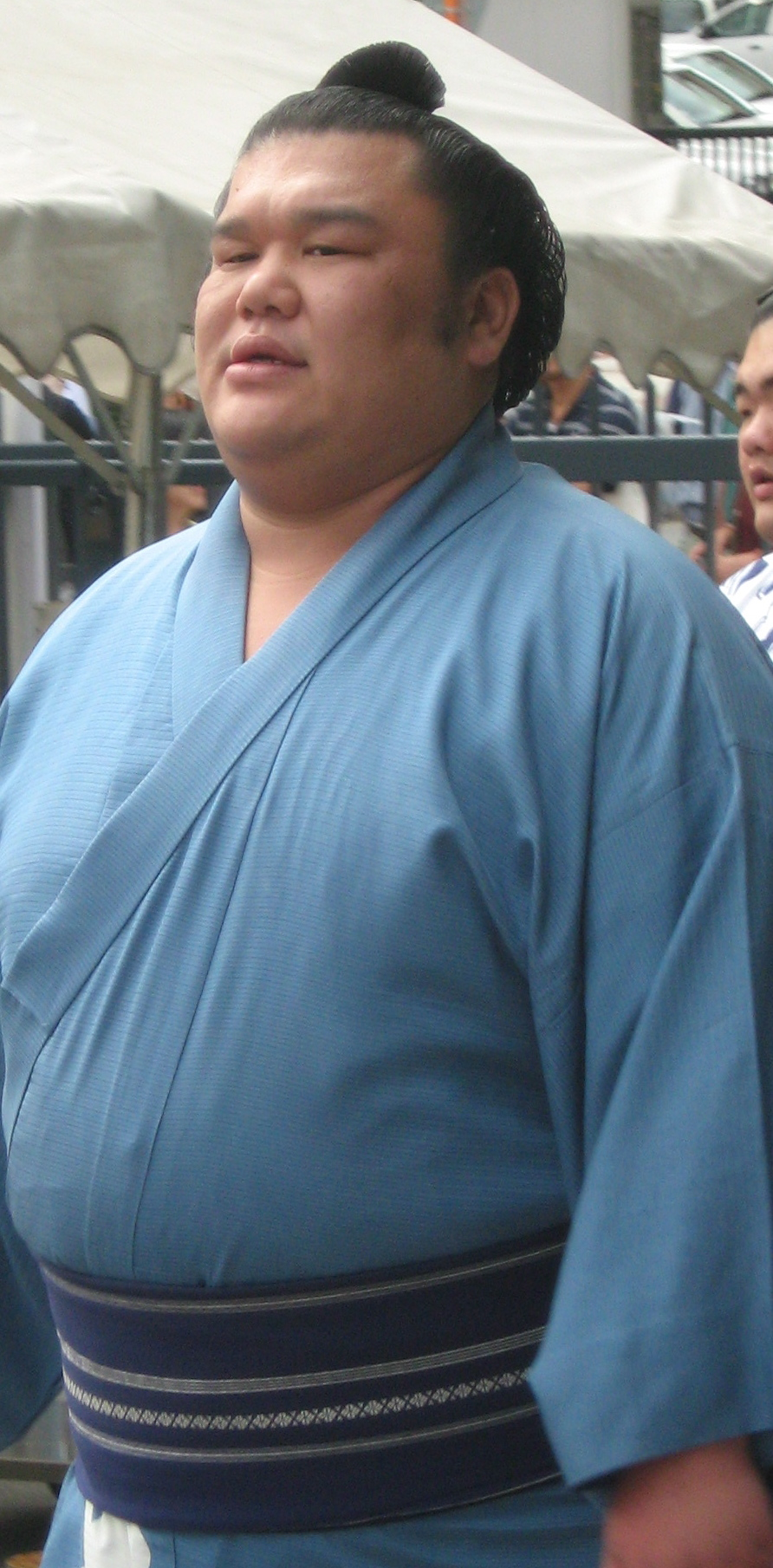
- Mamoru in 2008

Personal information
- Native name: 木村山守
- Born: Mamoru Kimura; 13 July 1981 Gobo, Japan
- Died: 6 July 2024 (aged 42) Tokyo, Japan
- Height: 1.83 m (6 ft 0 in)
- Weight: 170 kg (370 lb; 27 st)

Sport
- Sport: Sumo
- University team: Toyo University
- Retired: January 2014
- Heya: Kasugano
- Record: 343-328-7
- Debut: March 2004
- Highest rank: Maegashira 7 (November 2010)
- Elder name: Iwatomo
- Championships: 2 (Jūryō)
- Updated on June 2020

Kimurayama Mamoru (13 July 1981 – 6 July 2024) was a Japanese professional sumo wrestler. His highest rank was maegashira 7. He was a coach at Kasugano stable. He was the only wrestler in the elite ranks in his time from Wakayama Prefecture.

== Career ==
Born in Gobo, Wakayama Prefecture he was an amateur champion at Toyo University, but did not have enough collegiate titles to receive makushita tsukedashi status and join professional sumo in the third highest makushita division, instead beginning at the bottom of the rankings in March 2004. He joined Kasugano stable, run by another Wakayama Prefecture native, the former sekiwake Tochinowaka. His shikona or fighting name was adapted from his own surname, which is also a time-honoured name in Kasugano stable, being the name of a gyoji or referee, Kimura Soshiro, who ran the stable in the early 20th century.

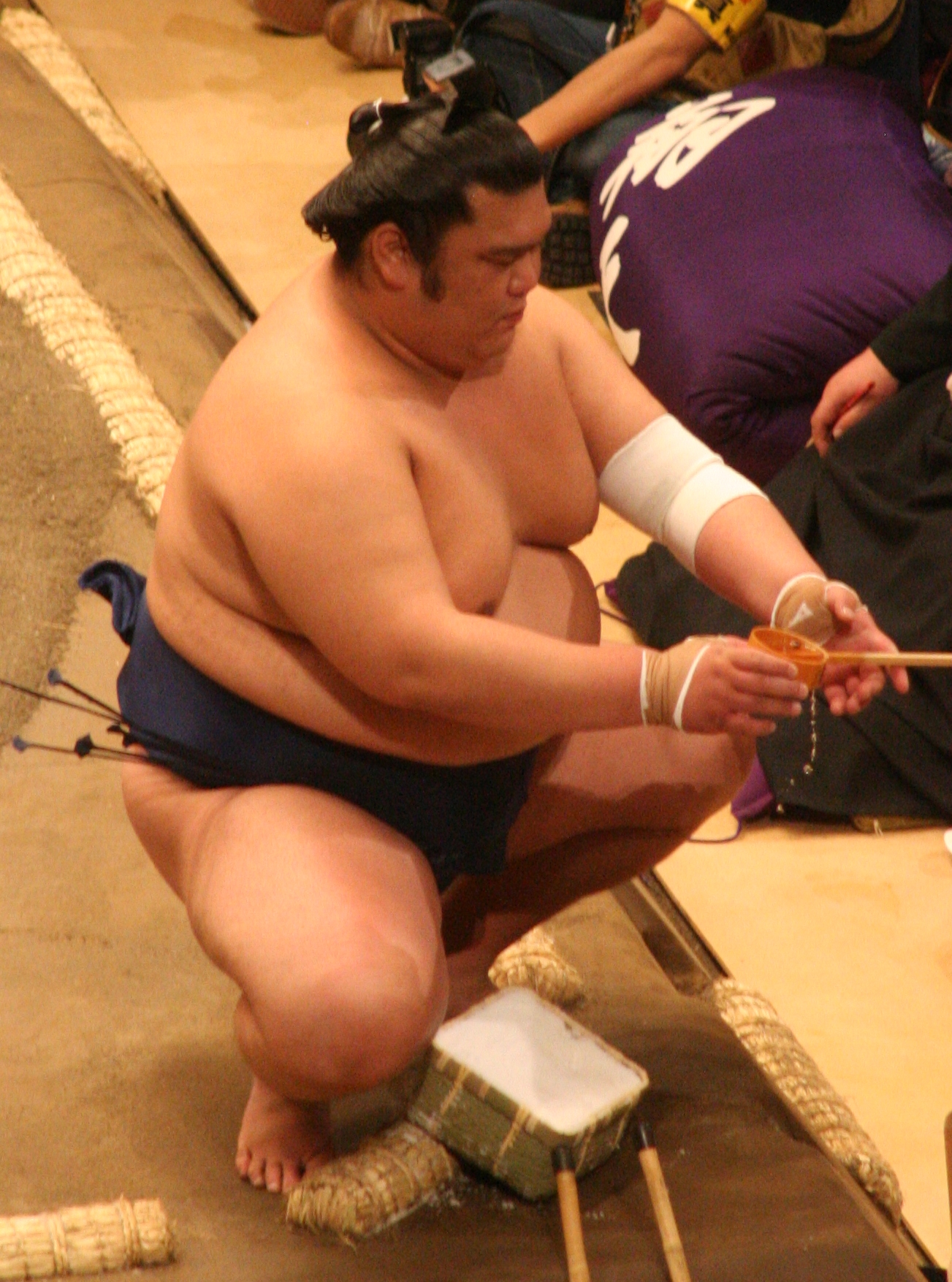
Kimurayama in May 2009

Kimurayama reached sekitori status in January 2008 upon promotion to the second highest jūryō division and won his first yūshō or tournament championship in the following tournament with a 12–3 record. He made his debut in the top makuuchi division two tournaments later at maegashira 12, but fell short with a 7–8 record. He won his second jūryō championship in March 2010, after a three way playoff with Kōryū and Tamaasuka. He did not manage a kachi-koshi or winning record in the top division until his eighth try in July 2010. This performance, and another 8–7 in September, resulted in promotion to what was to be his highest career rank of maegashira 7 for the November 2010 tournament.

He moved up from maegashira 17 to maegashira 15 despite only scoring 7–8 in the May 2011 Technical Examination tournament, due to the large number of retirements caused by a match-fixing scandal. Despite recording his fifth successive make-koshi in September 2011, he remained in makuuchi for the November tournament. After yet another losing score there he was finally demoted back to juryo in January 2012 and spent only one more tournament in the top division, in September 2012. Of his total of 16 tournaments fought in the top division, only two resulted in winning records (both 8–7), and his record there was 101 wins against 139 losses.

== Retirement from sumo ==
Kimurayama chose to retire and take on an elder name rather than being demoted to makushita after the January 2014 tournament. He secured the Iwatomo toshiyori-kabu, one of 105 shares in the Japan Sumo Association, and later worked as a coach at Kasugano stable. He was then known as Iwatomo Oyakata.

== Death ==
Kimurayama died in Tokyo on 6 July 2024, at the age of 42, after being hospitalized in May 2024.

== Fighting style ==
Kimurayama favoured pushing and thrusting techniques as opposed to fighting on the mawashi. His most common winning kimarite (or technique) was a simple oshi-dashi, or push out. He frequently employed the sidestepping henka move at the tachi-ai or initial charge, and consequently won many bouts by hiki-otoshi, the pull down, and tsuki-otoshi, the thrust over.

== Career record ==
Kimurayama Mamoru
Year	January Hatsu basho, Tokyo	March Haru basho, Osaka	May Natsu basho, Tokyo	July Nagoya basho, Nagoya	September Aki basho, Tokyo	November Kyūshū basho, Fukuoka
2004	x	(Maezumo)	East Jonokuchi #12; 6–1	East Jonidan #62; 6–1	East Sandanme #93; 6–1	East Sandanme #35; 6–1
2005	East Makushita #51; 6–1	West Makushita #22; 2–5	East Makushita #37; 3–4	West Makushita #45; 6–1	West Makushita #18; 3–4	West Makushita #23; 4–3
2006	West Makushita #16; 4–3	East Makushita #11; 4–3	West Makushita #7; 5–2	East Makushita #3; 4–3	East Makushita #1; 2–5	West Makushita #9; 0–0–7
2007	West Makushita #49; 5–2	East Makushita #29; 6–1	East Makushita #12; 5–2	West Makushita #5; 4–3	East Makushita #4; 4–3	West Makushita #1; 6–1
2008	West Jūryō #11; 6–9	East Jūryō #14; 12–3; Champion	West Jūryō #2; 11–4	West Maegashira #12; 7–8	West Maegashira #14; 7–8	East Maegashira #15; 6–9
2009	West Jūryō #1; 9–6	West Maegashira #15; 7–8	East Maegashira #16; 5–10	West Jūryō #5; 8–7	East Jūryō #2; 9–6	West Maegashira #14; 4–11
2010	West Jūryō #3; 7–8	West Jūryō #4; 11–4–PP; Champion	West Maegashira #12; 7–8	West Maegashira #13; 8–7	East Maegashira #9; 8–7	West Maegashira #7; 5–10
2011	West Maegashira #14; 6–9	Tournament Cancelled; 0–0–0	East Maegashira #17; 7–8	West Maegashira #15; 7–8	West Maegashira #16; 7–8	East Maegashira #17; 4–11
2012	West Jūryō #5; 5–10	West Jūryō #11; 8–7	West Jūryō #9; 10–5	East Jūryō #3; 9–6	West Maegashira #14; 6–9	East Jūryō #2; 6–9
2013	West Jūryō #4; 4–11	East Jūryō #11; 7–8	West Jūryō #11; 3–12	West Makushita #6; 4–3	East Makushita #3; 5–2	West Jūryō #11; 7–8
2014	West Jūryō #11; Retired; 4–11	x	x	x	x	x
Record given as wins–losses–absences Top division champion Top division runner-up Retired Lower divisions Non-participation Sanshō key: F=Fighting spirit; O=Outstanding performance; T=Technique Also shown: ★=Kinboshi; P=Playoff(s); Divisions: Makuuchi — Jūryō — Makushita — Sandanme — Jonidan — Jonokuchi Makuuchi ranks: Yokozuna — Ōzeki — Sekiwake — Komusubi — Maegashira

== See also ==
- Glossary of sumo terms
- List of sumo tournament second division champions
- List of past sumo wrestlers
- List of sumo elders
