= Toyonoshima Daiki =

Japanese sumo wrestler

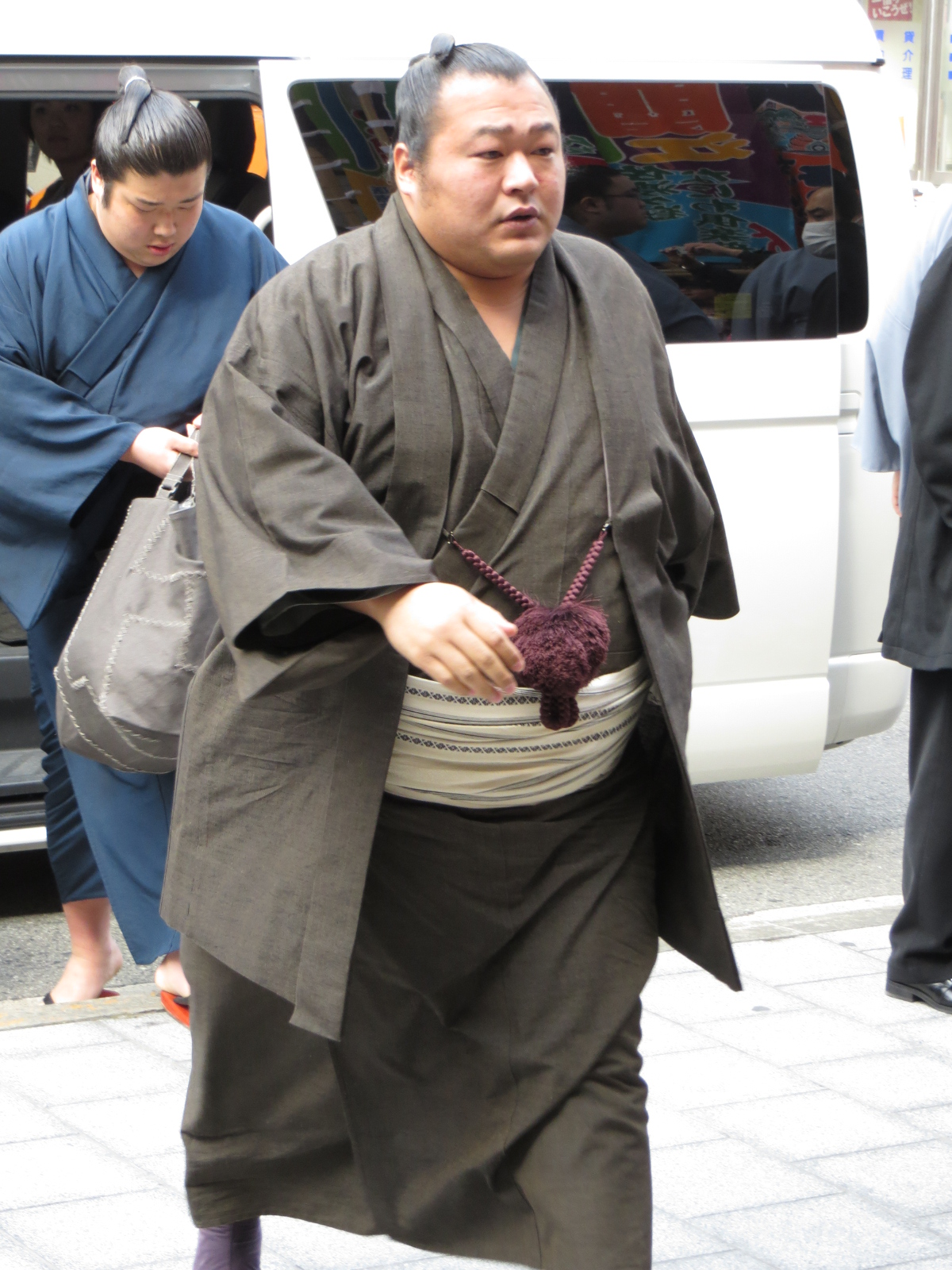
- Daiki in 2013

Personal information
- Native name: 豊ノ島 大樹
- Born: Daiki Kajiwara; June 26, 1983 (age 43) Sukumo, Kōchi, Japan
- Height: 1.68 m (5 ft 6 in)
- Weight: 154.5 kg (341 lb; 24 st 5 lb)
- Website: https://plaza.rakuten.co.jp/toyo19830626/

Sport
- Sport: Sumo
- Retired: April, 2020
- Heya: Tokitsukaze
- Record: 703–641–68
- Debut: January, 2002
- Highest rank: Sekiwake (Sept, 2008)
- Elder name: Izutsu
- Championships: 2 (Jūryō); 1 (Jonidan); 1 (Jonokuchi)
- Special Prizes: Fighting Spirit (3); Technique (4); Outstanding Performance (3)
- Gold Stars: 4 Harumafuji (3); Hakuhō
- Updated on Apr 17, 2020

Toyonoshima Daiki (born June 26, 1983, as Daiki Kajiwara) is a former professional sumo wrestler from Sukumo, Kōchi, Japan. He made his professional debut in January 2002, reaching the top makuuchi division in September 2004. He was a runner-up in five tournaments, and earned ten special prizes. His highest rank was sekiwake, which he first reached in September 2008 and held for five tournaments in total. Following a suspension in July 2010 he was demoted to the jūryō division, but upon his return to makuuchi in November 2010 he took part in a playoff for the championship. He won four kinboshi or gold stars awarded for yokozuna upsets, three of them earned by defeating Harumafuji from 2013 to 2015. He wrestled for Tokitsukaze stable. He retired in 2020 and was an elder of the Japan Sumo Association under the name of Izutsu-oyakata until his departure from the association in January 2023.

== Early life and sumo background ==
Toyonoshima is the oldest son of a tofu maker. In his early years, he was an avid soccer player. However, his destiny changed after winning an area boys' sumo tournament championship. In junior high and high school, he was rivals with another future sumo wrestler who would go on to take the fighting name Kotoshōgiku. Kotoshōgiku later became a rival of his in professional sumo as well. After graduating from high school, Toyonoshima joined Tokitsukaze stable through a connection a friend of his father's had with the stable. He was below the minimum height requirement of 173 cm but was allowed to make his debut after passing a secondary physical exam.

== Career ==
=== Early career and rise to sekiwake ===
On entering the sumo world, Toyonoshima rose quickly through the lower ranks of sumo, winning two championships or yūshō in the jonokuchi and jonidan divisions with perfect 7–0 records. He reached sekitori status in March 2004 after a 5–2 result at the rank of makushita 2. He moved through the jūryō in just two tournaments with consecutive 11–4 records. Upon reaching the top makuuchi division he initially had little success and was demoted back to jūryō twice. However, after winning the jūryō championship in September 2005 with a strong 14–1 record, his fortunes began to turn and after some initial struggles, he rose steadily through the ranks of makuuchi.

In May 2006 Toyonoshima recorded only his second kachi-koshi or winning score in the top division, in his ninth tournament there. His first big success came in January 2007 when ranked at maegashira 9 he finished as runner up to yokozuna Asashōryū with an outstanding 12–3 record and earned his first special prizes for Fighting Spirit and Technique. In March he defeated two ōzeki, Kotoōshū and Chiyotaikai, and earned promotion to komusubi for May. At just 168 cm, or 5 ft 6 in (1.68 m) tall, he was the shortest wrestler to make komusubi in fifty years. However, before the tournament began he sprained his knee and ankle ligaments in a practice session with Asashōryū at his stable and could only manage four wins in his san'yaku (titled rank) debut.

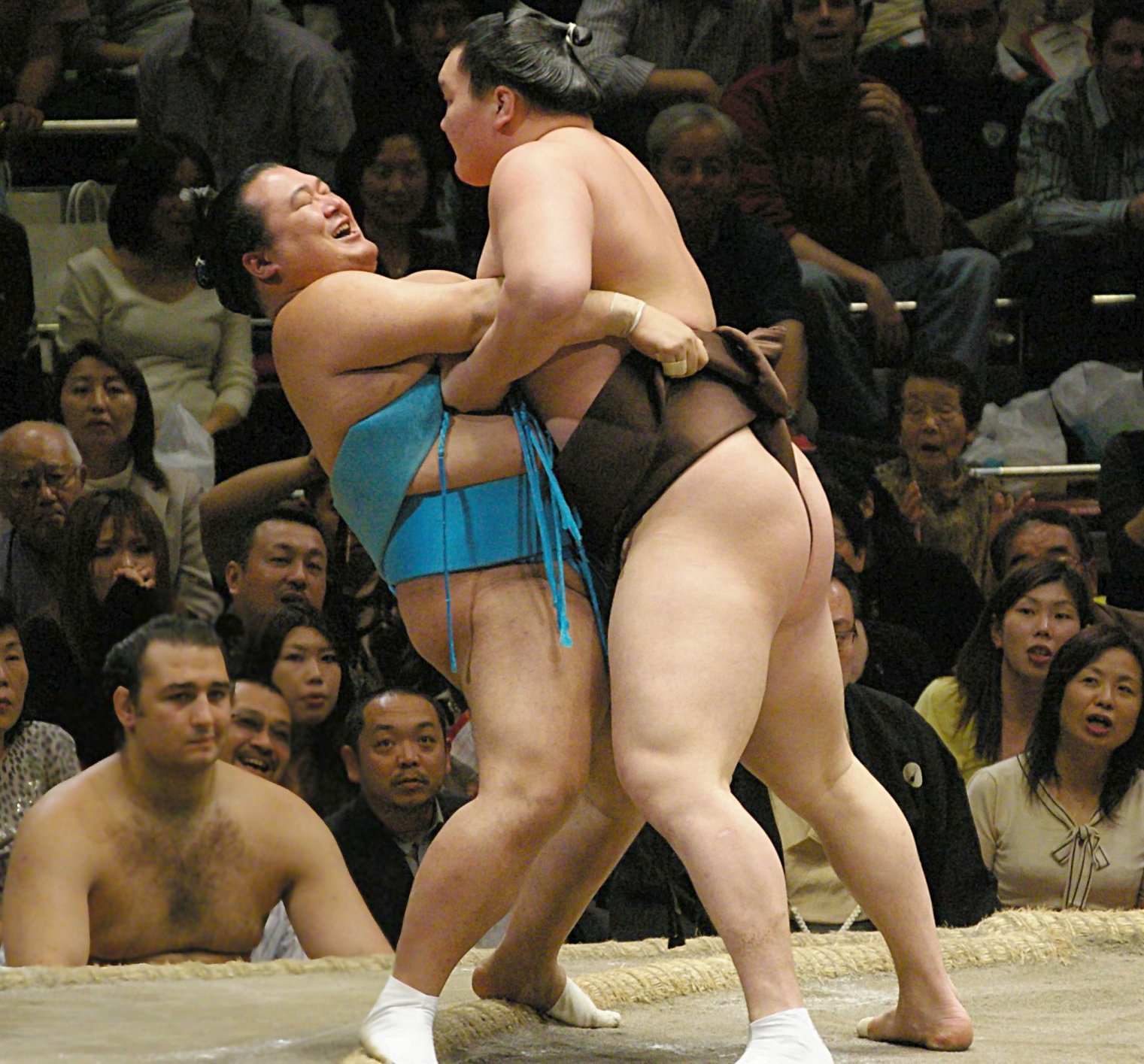
A bout between Toyonoshima and Hakuhō, 2007

In September 2007 Toyonoshima became the first maegashira to defeat Hakuhō since his promotion to yokozuna, earning his first kinboshi. He also defeated ōzeki Kotoōshū and Kotomitsuki. He finished with an 8–7 score and was awarded the Outstanding Performance prize. He achieved another winning record in the next tournament but faltered slightly with two 6–9 scores in January and March 2008. In May, however, he was on the leaderboard for much of the tournament and finished with joint runner-up honours and a share of the Fighting Spirit prize. He was one of seven wrestlers who NHK commentator Shūhei Nagao (the former Mainoumi) in 2008 called the "Seven Samurai" and identified as "holding the key" to a Japanese resurgence in sumo, which was dominated by foreigners in the top ranks. (The others were Gōeidō, Kisenosato, Kotoshōgiku, Hōmashō, Toyohibiki and Tochiōzan).

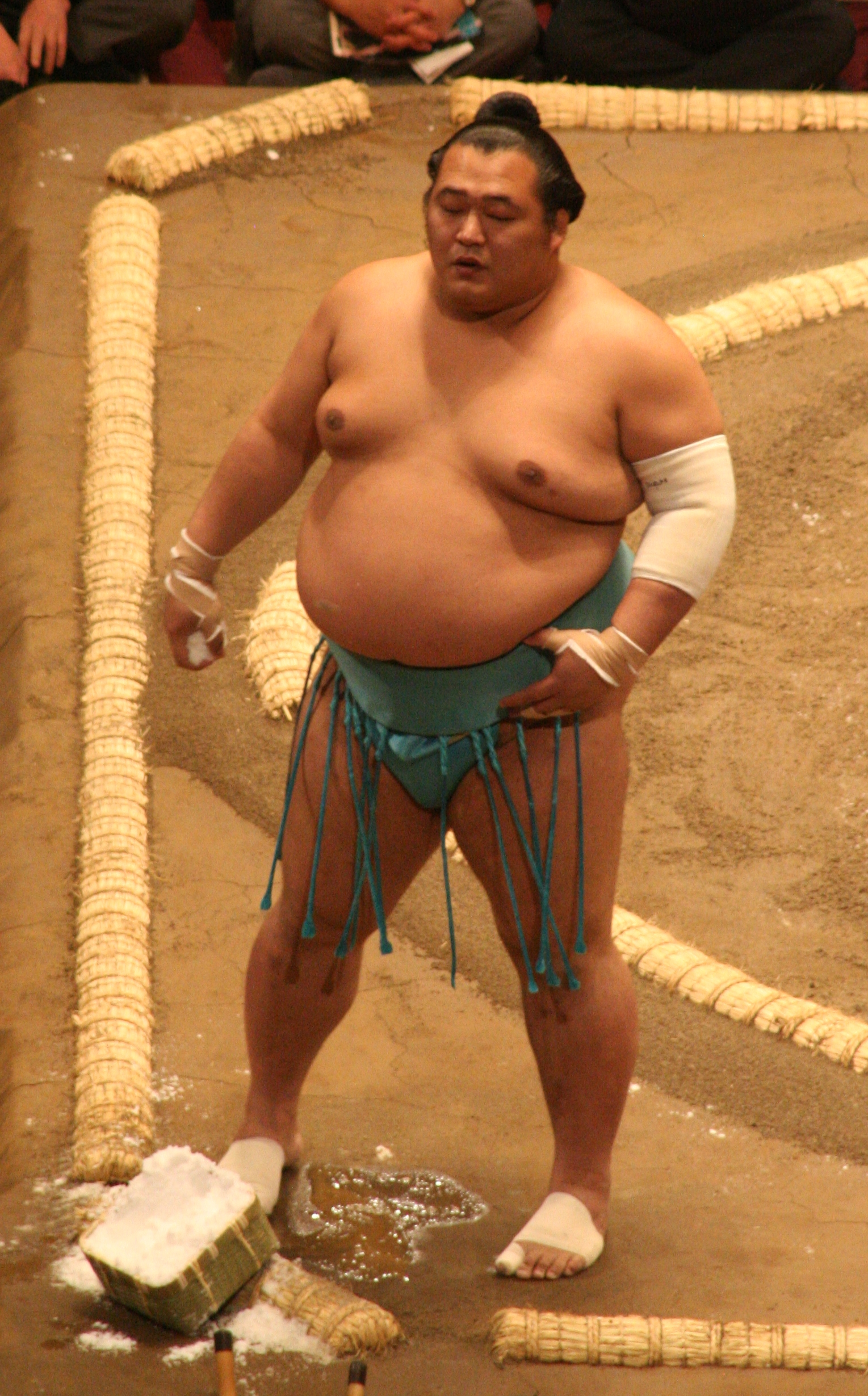
Toyonoshima in May 2009, wearing a support for his left elbow after being injured in January.

Toyonoshima returned to the san'yaku ranks at komusubi for the July 2008 tournament, where he defeated Asashōryū for the first time on the opening day. He finished with ten wins and another Outstanding Performance prize, and Kotoshogiku's losing record meant Toyonoshima was promoted to sekiwake for the September tournament, becoming the first wrestler from Tokitsukaze stable to reach the rank since Kurama in 1978. He fell short with a 6–9 score and was demoted to maegashira 1, but returned to komusubi for the January 2009 tournament.

On the 7th day of the January 2009 tournament, Toyonoshima fell victim to ōzeki Kaiō's kotenage armbar throw. Toyonoshima appeared to suffer a severely hyper-extended elbow during the throw. Despite being doubled over in pain, Toyonoshima managed to bow to Kaiō and left the dohyō unassisted, until he was safely back in the dressing area, where medical attention appeared to be prompt. NHK English-language announcers later reported that Toyonoshima said he heard the elbow snap. The online-edition of the Yomiuri Shimbun reported that Toyonoshima was diagnosed with left-elbow sprain" and he was forced to forfeit the next day's scheduled bout against Kotoshōgiku. Later news reports indicated that the Japan Sumo Association doctors told the 25-year-old rikishi to take a six-week medical leave, and that Toyonoshima would bow out of the remainder of the 2009 Hatsu basho at the Ryōgoku Kokugikan in Tokyo. This is the first occasion since his debut that he has missed any tournament bouts.

Toyonoshima returned to action in the March tournament in Osaka with his elbow strapped, but secured a winning record of 8–7 on the final day. In May, ranked at maegashira 3, he could manage only two wins in the first twelve days before winning his last three bouts. He produced his best performance of the year in November, a promising 11–4 score which won him his second Technique prize and opened up the possibility of promotion back to san'yaku in January 2010. However, due to Chiyotaikai's demotion to sekiwake and Kakuryū finishing 7–8, he had to settle for the maegashira 1 position. He recovered from 3–6 down in the January tournament to post his majority of wins, and this returned him to the san'yaku ranks for the first time in seven tournaments, at sekiwake. He began brightly in the March tournament, opening with three consecutive wins, but he then faded and finished with just six wins against nine losses.

=== Tournament playoff ===
He was suspended along with over a dozen other wrestlers from the July 2010 tournament after admitting involvement in illegal betting on baseball. As a result, he was demoted to the jūryō division for the following September. He bounced back from this penalty with an impressive 14–1 record and took his second jūryō championship, exactly five years after his first, guaranteeing himself promotion back into the top division. Fighting from maegashira 9 in November, he produced another 14–1 score, losing only to Kyokutenhō and defeating two ōzeki. He lost to Hakuhō in a playoff for the yūshō on the final day, narrowly failing to become the first wrestler ever to win back-to-back jūryō and makuuchi championships (and the first Japanese-born winner of a top division tournament since 2006), but he received special prizes for Fighting Spirit and Technique. He was promoted to maegashira 1 for the following tournament in January, the first time that a maegashira has won fourteen bouts and not been promoted to a san'yaku rank. He made a poor start to the January tournament losing seven of his first eight matches, but he recovered to earn his 8–7 majority of wins on the final day. This returned him to san'yaku for the (subsequently cancelled) March tournament. In the May 'technical examination' tournament he had an even worse start, losing nine of his first ten bouts and finishing on 5–10.

He returned to komusubi in September 2011 and recovered from a 1–7 start for the second time in his career to keep his rank with an 8–7 score. He rose to sekiwake in January 2012 but lost his rank after only scoring 5–10. He had a fine tournament in March, beating the ōzeki Kotoshōgiku and Kotoōshū and sharing the Technique prize, which returned him immediately to sekiwake. In the May 2012 basho he defeated Hakuhō for just the second time in the top division, sending the yokozuna crashing to his fourth loss of the tournament. In this period he managed to achieve enough winning tournaments to stay in the higher ranks of makuuchi, and also earned two gold star wins against yokozuna Harumafuji, which were ironically both losing tournaments for Toyonoshima.

=== Later career and fall to makushita ===
Toyonoshima maintained his position in the upper maegashira ranks in 2015, earning a fourth kinboshi in March when he again defeated Harumafuji. In January 2016 he produced his best performance for several years when his 12–3 record included a win over the eventual winner Kotoshōgiku and saw him tying for second place and being awarded the prize for Outstanding Performance. This was his tenth special prize, putting him level with Harumafuji and behind only Gōeidō and Aminishiki amongst active wrestlers. His performance saw him being promoted to sekiwake for the fifth time, and for the first time since May 2012. His next two tournaments were disappointing: he lost his sekiwake rank after recording only three wins in March and then posted a 5–10 record in May. He missed the July 2016 tournament after undergoing surgery for a left Achilles tendon rupture which occurred in training and as a result was demoted to jūryō for the first time since 2010. He decided to skip the September tournament as well to allow his injury to fully heal, which meant a demotion to the makushita division. He is only the second wrestler to have fallen to makushita having previously taken part in a makuuchi division playoff, after Hokutōriki. He considered retiring at this point, but was persuaded to carry on by his young daughter.

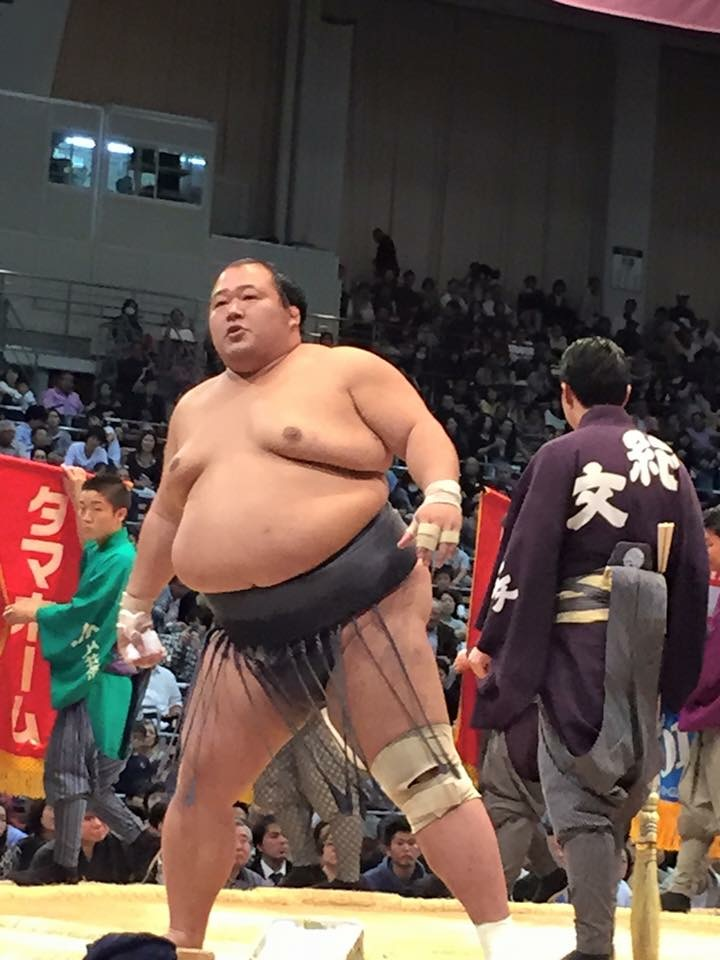
Toyonoshima in 2017

Toyonoshima managed only a bare majority of four wins against three losses on his comeback in November 2016 but recorded six wins in January 2017. He strained his right calf in training shortly before the March 2017 tournament, and after missing his first match announced his withdrawal, although he returned from the fifth day. By January 2018 he had risen to makushita 5, but he was again affected by injury in this tournament, withdrawing on Day 5 and again on Day 9 having returned on Day 7. He won promotion back to the jūryō division after a 6–1 record at makushita 1 in September 2018, after an absence of 13 tournaments. He is the sixth oldest wrestler post-World War II to return to jūryō at 35 years and four months. In March 2019 he was promoted back to makuuchi. He is the third former sekiwake to fall to makushita and make a return to makuuchi after Kotokaze and Hōō.

== Retirement from sumo ==
In 2020 Toyonoshima fell back to the makushita division after suffering an arm injury, and he announced his retirement on April 17. His career record was 703 wins against 641 losses over 109 career tournaments, and his top division record was 493 wins against 524 losses over 71 tournaments. He assumed the elder name of Izutsu, previously held by the late Sakahoko, and will work as a coach in the Japan Sumo Association. He had reportedly been making payments towards the Nishikijima name previously intended for his former stablemate Shimotori before he was forced to quit sumo, but he was ultimately unable to acquire it, and the stock went to Asasekiryū instead.

Toyonoshima's retirement ceremony was held on May 28, 2022, at the Ryōgoku Kokugikan. On January 4, 2023, he announced his departure as a member of the Sumo Association in order to pursue a career as a TV personality. Alongside his work as a presenter, Toyonoshima also coaches the Tachikawa Aircraft Company corporate sumo club, where he trains the women's team.

== Fighting style ==
Toyonoshima was equally adept at grappling techniques, or yotsu-sumo, and pushing/thrusting techniques, oshi-sumo. His two most common winning kimarite were yori-kiri, the force out, and oshi-dashi, the push out. His favourite grip on his opponent's mawashi was hidari-yotsu, a right hand outside, left hand inside grip, from which position he also regularly employed shitate-nage, or the inner arm throw.

== Personal life ==
Toyonoshima was married to pop singer Sunaho Takeuchi in February 2011 and the wedding reception was held that October in Tokyo's Metropolitan Hotel with around 600 guests attending.

== Career record ==
Toyonoshima Daiki
Year	January Hatsu basho, Tokyo	March Haru basho, Osaka	May Natsu basho, Tokyo	July Nagoya basho, Nagoya	September Aki basho, Tokyo	November Kyūshū basho, Fukuoka
2002	(Maezumo)	West Jonokuchi #32; 7–0; Champion	West Jonidan #26; 7–0–P; Champion	East Sandanme #30; 5–2	East Sandanme #5; 3–4	East Sandanme #17; 4–3
2003	West Sandanme #6; 7–0–P	West Makushita #10; 2–5	West Makushita #27; 3–4	East Makushita #34; 5–2	West Makushita #21; 4–3	East Makushita #17; 5–2
2004	West Makushita #7; 4–3	West Makushita #4; 5–2	West Jūryō #13; 11–4	East Jūryō #4; 11–4	West Maegashira #15; 6–9	East Jūryō #1; 8–7
2005	East Maegashira #17; 8–7	East Maegashira #13; 7–8	West Maegashira #13; 6–9	East Maegashira #16; 6–9	West Jūryō #1; 14–1; Champion	East Maegashira #8; 7–8
2006	West Maegashira #9; 7–8	West Maegashira #10; 6–9	East Maegashira #13; 8–7	East Maegashira #11; 9–6	West Maegashira #6; 4–11	West Maegashira #10; 8–7
2007	West Maegashira #9; 12–3; TF	West Maegashira #1; 8–7	East Komusubi #1; 4–11	West Maegashira #4; 7–8	East Maegashira #5; 8–7; O★	East Maegashira #4; 9–6
2008	East Maegashira #2; 6–9	West Maegashira #3; 6–9	West Maegashira #5; 11–4; F	West Komusubi #1; 10–5; O	West Sekiwake #1; 6–9	East Maegashira #1; 9–6
2009	West Komusubi #1; 2–6–7	West Maegashira #6; 8–7	West Maegashira #3; 5–10	East Maegashira #7; 8–7	East Maegashira #4; 7–8	East Maegashira #5; 11–4; T
2010	East Maegashira #1; 8–7	West Sekiwake #1; 6–9	East Maegashira #1; 5–10	East Maegashira #5; Suspended; 0–0–15	West Jūryō #1; 14–1; Champion	West Maegashira #9; 14–1–P; FT
2011	East Maegashira #1; 8–7	Tournament Cancelled; 0–0–0	West Komusubi #1; 5–10	West Maegashira #2; 9–6	West Komusubi #1; 8–7	East Komusubi #1; 9–6
2012	West Sekiwake #1; 5–10	East Maegashira #4; 11–4; T	East Sekiwake #1; 7–8	West Komusubi #1; 5–10	West Maegashira #3; 6–9	West Maegashira #6; 11–4
2013	East Maegashira #2; 6–9	East Maegashira #4; 7–8 ★	West Maegashira #4; 7–8	West Maegashira #5; 6–9	West Maegashira #7; 8–7	West Maegashira #2; 8–7
2014	East Maegashira #1; 8–7	East Komusubi #1; 5–10	West Maegashira #4; 4–9–2 ★	West Maegashira #10; 10–5	West Maegashira #2; 6–6–3	East Maegashira #6; 8–7
2015	East Maegashira #4; 7–8	East Maegashira #5; 8–7 ★	East Maegashira #2; 4–11	West Maegashira #7; 7–8	West Maegashira #8; 10–5	East Maegashira #3; 5–9–1
2016	East Maegashira #7; 12–3; O	West Sekiwake #1; 3–12	East Maegashira #7; 5–10	East Maegashira #11; Sat out due to injury 0–0–15	East Jūryō #8; Sat out due to injury 0–0–15	West Makushita #7; 4–3
2017	West Makushita #6; 6–1	East Makushita #2; 1–5–1	East Makushita #19; 3–4	East Makushita #28; 5–2	West Makushita #17; 4–3	West Makushita #13; 5–2
2018	East Makushita #5; 0–3–4	West Makushita #35; 6–1	East Makushita #14; 5–2	West Makushita #7; 5–2	West Makushita #1; 6–1	East Jūryō #13; 11–4
2019	West Jūryō #5; 10–5	West Maegashira #14; 5–10	East Jūryō #1; 8–7	East Maegashira #14; 7–8	West Maegashira #14; 1–9–5	West Jūryō #8; 6–9
2020	East Jūryō #11; 4–11	East Makushita #2; 2–5	West Makushita #7; Tournament Cancelled; 0–0–0	West Makushita #7; Retired –	x	x
Record given as wins–losses–absences Top division champion Top division runner-up Retired Lower divisions Non-participation Sanshō key: F=Fighting spirit; O=Outstanding performance; T=Technique Also shown: ★=Kinboshi; P=Playoff(s); Divisions: Makuuchi — Jūryō — Makushita — Sandanme — Jonidan — Jonokuchi Makuuchi ranks: Yokozuna — Ōzeki — Sekiwake — Komusubi — Maegashira

== See also ==
- List of sumo tournament top division runners-up
- List of sumo tournament second division champions
- List of active gold star earners
- Glossary of sumo terms
- List of past sumo wrestlers
- List of sumo elders
- List of sekiwake
