= List of non-Japanese sumo wrestlers =

This is a list of professional sumo wrestlers who are either foreign-born or of mixed heritage by country and/or ethnicity of origin, along with original name, years active in sumo wrestling, and highest rank attained. Noted if applicable are Japanese hometown, naturalization, and sumo elder status. Names in bold indicate a still-active wrestler.

As of November 2026, there have been 216 wrestlers listing a foreign country as their place of origin (shusshin) on the official ranking sheet (banzuke); a figure not accounting for foreign-born wrestlers credited with a Japanese hometown.

== History ==
The first foreign born wrestler to reach the top makuuchi division was the Hawaiian born Takamiyama in January 1968, who was also the first to win a top division tournament championship or yūshō in 1972. He was followed by fellow Hawaiians Konishiki who was the first foreigner to reach the second highest ōzeki rank in 1987, and American Akebono who became the first foreign yokozuna, the highest rank, in 1993. In 1992, following the entry of six Mongolians to Ōshima stable, there was an unofficial ban (called enryo or "restraint") instigated by the Japan Sumo Association's head Dewanoumi on any more foreign recruitment. Speaking at a Western Japan Press Club luncheon in Osaka in 1995, Dewanoumi reportedly said, "There are no official regulations, but stable masters have a tacit agreement not to scout foreigners actively because they have difficulty adapting to Japanese customs." In 1998 this ban was relaxed but there was also the first official restrictions, a cap of forty foreigners in professional sumo as a whole and each individual heya or training stable restricted to a maximum of two, not counting those who had obtained Japanese citizenship. In February 2002 this was changed to one foreigner per heya with no overall cap, although foreigners recruited prior to the rule change were not affected. Despite these restrictions, foreigners began to dominate the highest levels of the sport. By 2013, foreign born wrestlers made up just seven percent of the 613 wrestlers active in professional sumo, yet occupied one third of the 42 spots in the top division. No Japanese-born wrestler won a top division tournament between Tochiazuma in January 2006 and Kotoshōgiku in January 2016, with 56 of the 58 tournaments held in that period won by Mongolians.

Several foreign-born sumo wrestlers have become sumo elders after their retirement as wrestlers.

== Annotations ==
# marks a foreign-born wrestler credited with a Japanese hometown (shusshin) and hence not counted against the one-foreigner-per-stable restriction active since 2002.

‡ marks a foreign-born wrestler naturalized as a Japanese citizen only after joining professional sumo and thus still counted against the one-foreigner-per-stable restriction active since 2002.

§ marks a retired foreign-born wrestler who became a sumo elder, of which becoming a naturalized Japanese citizen is a necessary condition.

== Japanese-born wrestlers ==
Sumo name	Birth Name	Ethnicity	Hometown	Years active	Highest rank
Asakomiya Masahiro	Masahiro Komiya	Korean-Japanese	Saitama	2006–2007	jonokuchi 42
Baraki Genki	Baraki Ito	Filipino-Japanese	Saitama	2013–2024	makushita 58
Chiyotaikai Ryūji	Ryūji Sudō	Taiwanese-Japanese	Oita	1992–2010	ōzeki
Daishōyū Maabin	Marvin Lee Sano Jr.	American-Japanese	Tokyo	2006–2008	makushita 18
Fujinohana Rei	Rei Saito	American-Japanese	Miyagi	2009–2017	sandanme 16
Fujinoumi Jun	Jun Saito	American-Japanese	Miyagi	2009–2017	makushita 47
**Fujiryōga Masaharu**	Masaharu Goshima	Filipino-Japanese	Aichi	2026–active	maegashira 1
**Gyokuōzan Yoshihito**	Hidetoshi Kanazawa	Paraguayan-Japanese	Aichi	2022–active	makushita 20
Hokuōzan Kōkichi	Hikari Hagiwara	Turkish-Japanese	Hokkaido	2020–2023	makushita 35
**Honoikazuchi Kurisu**	Li Bill Christopher	Filipino-Japanese	Kanagawa	2026–active	makushita 37
**Ikazuchidō Neri**	Neri Yamada	Nigerian-Japanese	Saitama	2022–active	makushita 23
Itadaki Sennosuke	Masahiko Kikuchi	Canadian-Japanese	Tokyo	2010–2024	makushita 18
Itsunoshima Naohide	Naohide Takebayashi	Korean-Japanese	Aichi	2002–2004	jonidan 91
Kaitōma Aron	Mark Aron Justin Toma	Brazilian-Japanese-Filipino	Kanagawa	2017–2025	jonidan 2
Kaneshiro Kōfuku	Kofuku Kaneshiro	Korean-Japanese	Miyazaki	1974–1987	sekiwake
Kinkaiyama Ryū	Ryusui Kin	Korean-Japanese	Nagasaki	1991–2006	maegashira 6
**Kotoeihō Hiroki**	Taiki Tebakari	Korean-Japanese	Chiba	2022–active	maegashira 1
**Kotoshōhō Yoshinari**	Toshiki Tebakari	Korean-Japanese	Chiba	2017–active	sekiwake
Maenoyama Tarō	Kazuichi Kaneshima	Korean-Japanese	Osaka	1961–1974	ōzeki
Maikeru Shūki	Maikeru Hayashi	Filipino-Japanese	Fukui	2017–2024	makushita 29
Matenrō Ken	Ken Shirata	American-Japanese	Yamagata	1991–2003	makushita 12
Mienoumi Tsuyoshi	Goro Ishiyama	Korean-Japanese	Mie	1963–1980	57th yokozuna
**Nabatame Tatsuya**	Tatsuya Nabatame	Thai-Japanese	Tochigi	2020–active	jūryō 5
Raō Nozomu	Rao Ito	Filipino-Japanese	Saitama	2011–2024	makushita 37
**Rinko Yoshikazu**	Rei Hayashi	Filipino-Japanese	Nagano	2022–active	makushita 46
Ryūga Tsunetaka	Corvin Ryuga Delzatto	American-Japanese	Kanagawa	2018–2020	jonidan 80
**Onbashira Ryu**	Ryu Hayashi	Filipino-Japanese	Nagano	2022–active	sandanme 22
Otani Masatada	Masatada Otani	American-Japanese	Okinawa	2022–2024	makushita 27
**Shōryū Yoshimitsu**	Yoshimitsu Kobayashi	Thai-Japanese	Nagano	2024–active	makushita 37
Taiga Kōji	Taiga Tanji	Russian-Japanese	Fukushima	2018–2025	makushita 32
Taihō Kōki	Koki Naya (Ivan Boryshko)	Ukrainian-Japanese	Karafuto	1956–1971	48th yokozuna
Takagenji Satoshi	Satoshi Kamiyama	Filipino-Japanese	Tochigi	2013–2021	maegashira 10
Takano Joji	Joji Takano	American-Japanese	Fukuoka	1974–1976	jonidan 34
Takanofuji Sanzō	Tsuyoshi Kamiyama	Filipino-Japanese	Tochigi	2013–2019	jūryō 5
**Takayasu Akira**	Akira Takayasu	Filipino-Japanese	Ibaraki	2005–active	ōzeki
Tamanoumi Masahiro	Masao Takeuchi	Korean-Japanese	Aichi	1959–1971	51st yokozuna
Tamarikidō Hideki	Hideki Yasumoto	Korean-Japanese	Tokyo	1997–2010	maegashira 8
**Tanji Jun**	Jun Tanji	Russian-Japanese	Fukushima	2022–active	jūryō 7
Tochinowaka Michihiro	Daewon Lee	Korean-Japanese	Hyogo	2007–2015	maegashira 1
**Tōhakuryū Masahito**	Masahito Shiraishi	Taiwanese-Japanese	Tokyo	2019–active	maegashira 15
Tsuyukusa Kazuki	Tsuyukusa Kazuki	Polish-Japanese	Kanagawa	2016–2020	makushita 51
Wakatōshō Toshio	Toshio Kanemoto	Korean-Japanese	Chiba	1985–1993	jūryō 9
**Yonezawaryū Daiki**	Daiki Igarashi	Filipino-Japanese	Yamagata	2024–active	makushita 24

== Foreign-born wrestlers ==
=== Argentina ===
Sumo name	Birth Name	Years active	Highest rank
Hoshiandesu Hose	José Antonio Juárez	1988–2000	jūryō 2
Hoshitango Imachi	Imachi Marcelo Salomón	1987–2004	jūryō 3

=== Bolivia ===
Sumo name	Birth Name	Years active	Highest rank	Notes
Kirameki Takayoshi	Daniel Vélez-García	2020–2021	sandanme 70	# (Aichi)

=== Brazil ===
Sumo name	Birth Name	Ethnicity	Years active	Highest rank	Notes
**Agōra Kazuma**	Lucas Kazuo Iima	Japanese-Brazilian	2023–active	makushita 54	# (Gifu)
Azumakaze Futoshi	Tuzatto Giuliano Kochinda	Italian-Brazilian	1991–1999	sandanme 29	
Azumaō Yasuhito	Yasuhito Marcio Morita	Japanese-Brazilian	1994–2005	makushita 36	
Hakusan Momotarō	Pasquale Bosche	Italian-Brazilian	1977–1986	makushita 9	
Kaisei Ichirō	Ricardo Sugano	Japanese-Brazilian	2006–2022	sekiwake	§
Kaishin Kikuzō	Eiji Nagahama	Japanese-Brazilian	2004–2012	makushita 49	
Kawamura Kōsaku	Kosaku Kawamura	Japanese-Brazilian	1976–1983	sandanme 41	
Kitaazuma Kiyoshi	Tetsuya Takeda	Japanese-Brazilian	1991–1998	makushita 18	
Kiyonomine Minoru	Mario Minoru Akamine	Japanese-Brazilian	1979–1989	makushita 18	
Kotonomori Takamori	Mario Fuchiue	Japanese-Brazilian	1999–2000	jonidan 69	
Kotoōsako Shigeaki	Shigeaki Julio Osako	Japanese-Brazilian	1991–1994	jonidan 106	
Kuniazuma Hajime	Wander Ramos		1991–2004	jūryō 4	
Kuninosato Toshio	Roberto Toshio Wada	Japanese-Brazilian	1980–1992	makushita 23	
Ryūkō Gō	Luis Go Ikemori	Japanese-Brazilian	1992–1998	jūryō 8	
Takaazuma Katsushige	Christiano Luis de Souza		2004–2008	makushita 24	
Tatsunishiki	Yoshihira Takeuchi	Japanese-Brazilian	1967–1971	jonidan 6	
Wakaazuma Yoshinobu	Yoshinobu Kuroda	Japanese-Brazilian	1991–2003	jūryō 13	

=== Bulgaria ===
Sumo name	Birth Name	Years active	Highest rank	Notes
Aoiyama Kōsuke	Daniel Ivanov (Даниел Иванов)	2009–2024	sekiwake	§
Kotoōshū Katsunori	Kaloyan Stefanov Mahlyanov (Калоян Стефанов Махлянов)	2002–2014	ōzeki	§
Torakiō Daiki	Ventsislav Nikolov Katsarov (Венцислав Николов Кацаров)	2017–2019	sandanme 15	

=== Canada ===
Sumo name	Birth Name	Years active	Highest rank
Homarenishiki Yasokichi	Brodik Mackenzie Philip Henderson	2015–2016	sandanme 46
Kototenzan Toshimitsu	John Anthony Tenta Jr.	1985–1986	makushita 43

=== China ===
Sumo name	Birth Name	Region	Years active	Highest rank	Notes
Chiyohakuryū Kōto	Guangdou Bai (白光斗)	Inner Mongolia	2004–2011	sandanme 22	
**Daiseizan Daisuke**	Altan-Ochir Asgakhad (Алтан-Очирын Асгахад)	Inner Mongolia	2022–active	maegashira 16	
Kaiho I	Yi Pan (潘毅)	Shanghai	1990–1992	jonidan 79	
Kanōyama Sunyo	Chengyue Xie (叶盛悦)		1991–1992	jonokuchi 22	
Kiyonohana Ōyo	Lihua Zhang (张令华)	Fujian	1974–1978	jūryō 5	
Kōkiryū Kaito	Peihuang Chen (陈佩煌)	Fujian	2022–2024	jonidan 27	# (Osaka)
Kōsei Kō	Shiqiang Gao (高世強)	Liaoning	2003–2017	makushita 14	
Kotoō Shuton	Shidong Wang (王世東)	Shandong	1992–1993	sandanme 9	
Manazuru Hisashi	Songsong Cheng (程颂颂)	Beijing	2004–2015	sandanme 13	
Nakanokuni Shō	Chao Lu (呂超)	Beijing	2002–2012	jūryō 12	
Ryūtei Weifu	Weifu Li (李伟福)	Shandong	2004–2013	sandanme 3	
Sōkokurai Eikichi	Enkhtuvshin (Энхтүвшин)	Inner Mongolia	2003–2020	maegashira 2	§
Takaō Yu	Yu Wang (王瑜)	Shanghai	1991–2003	sandanme 41	
Wakashōji Ano	Ano Cho (赵晏绪)	Jilin	2010–2010	jonokuchi 22	

=== Czech Republic ===
Sumo name	Birth Name	Years active	Highest rank
Takanoyama Shuntarō	Pavel Bojar	2001–2014	maegashira 12

=== Egypt ===
Sumo name	Birth Name	Years active	Highest rank
Ōsunaarashi Kintarō	Abdelrahman Alaa el-Din Mohamed Ahmed Shalan (عبد الرحمن شعلان)	2012–2018	maegashira 1

=== Estonia ===
Sumo name	Birth Name	Years active	Highest rank
Baruto Kaito	Kaido Höövelson	2004–2013	ōzeki
Kitaōji Oto	Ott Juurikas	2004–2004	jonidan 114

=== Georgia ===
Sumo name	Birth Name	Years active	Highest rank
Gagamaru Masaru	Teimuraz Jugheli (თეიმურაზ ჯუღელი)	2005–2020	komusubi
Kokkai Futoshi	Merab Levan Tsaguria (მერაბ ლევან ცაგურია)	2001–2012	komusubi
Tochinoshin Tsuyoshi	Levan Gorgadze (ლევან გორგაძე)	2006–2023	ōzeki
Tsukasaumi Jōji	Merab George Tsaguria (მერაბ გიორგი ცაგურია)	2005–2006	sandanme 18

=== Hungary ===
Sumo name	Birth Name	Years active	Highest rank
Masutōō Akira	Attila Toth	2005–2021	makushita 8

=== Indonesia ===
Sumo name	Birth Name	Ethnicity	Years active	Highest rank
Kotoanbai Ken	Ken Anbai	Japanese-Indonesian	2015–2015	jonokuchi 25

=== Kazakhstan ===
Sumo name	Birth Name	Years active	Highest rank
Kazafuzan Taiga	Suyenesh Khudibayev (Сүйініш Худибаев / Суйиниш Худибаев)	2003–2014	makushita 10
**Kinbōzan Haruki**	Baltagul Yersin (Балтағұл Ерсін)	2021–active	maegashira 3

=== Japanese-occupied Korea ===
Sumo name	Birth Name	Years active	Highest rank	Notes
Rikidōzan Mitsuhiro	Shin-rak Kim (김신락) / Mitsuhiro Momota (百田光浩)	1940–1950	sekiwake	# (Ōmura, Nagasaki)
Chiinoyama Shōichirō	Shoichiro Toyokawa	1940–1945	jūryō 3	#

NOTE: Korea was ruled by the Empire of Japan from 1910 to 1945. Japanese-born Koreans are noted above.

=== South Korea ===
Sumo name	Birth Name	Years active	Highest rank	Notes
Harimayama Hanatarō	Sangjin Hong (홍상진 洪相鎭)	1990–1994	makushita 58	
Kaihakuzan Yungi	Yoongi Baek (백윤기 白允基)	1999–2000	sandanme 49	
Kasugaō Katsumasa	Sungtaek Kim (김성택 金成澤)	1998–2011	maegashira 3	
Kinryūzan Jongun	Jonggeun Kim (김종근 金鍾根)	2003–2009	sandanme 42	
Kōraiyama Yoshisuke	Gilryang Seo (서길량 徐吉亮)	1969–1981	makushita 11	
Kotoyanagi	Shigeki Nishimoto (西本重煕)	1983–1985	jonidan 78	Born in Japan to Japanese parents, but raised in South Korea
Kunimiyama	Kiju Kim (김기주 金基柱)	1977–1988	makushita 27	
Kuninofuji Kiifun	Kihun Song (송기훈 宋基勳)	2001–2002	jonidan 109	
Kyōryū Yoshitsuru	Seonhak Park (박선학 朴善鶴)	1975–1983	makushita 15	
Nankaiyama Shigehide	Naruhide Kan / Seongyeong Kang (강성영 姜成英)	1969–1971	makushita 57	
Nanzan Shukō	Suhyeong Chae (채수형 蔡洙亨)	1990–1992	sandanme 54	
Soranoumi Ichiriki	Sooyong Kim (김수영 金樹泳) / Juei Ōzora (大空樹泳)	1999–2019	makushita 25	
Watenkō	Kazuo Hayashi	1966–1970	sandanme 80	
Yamada Narihide	Seongyeong Yu (유성영) / Narihide Yamada (山田成英)	2004–2006	jonidan 31	

=== Mongolia ===
Sumo name	Birth Name	Years active	Highest rank	Notes
Aratōshi Mitsuo	Tserendorj Wanchigutseren (Цэрэндорж Ванчигцэрэн)	2008–2016	makushita 39	
Arauma Tōru	Battogtokh Turtogtokh (Төртогтох Баттогтох)	2020–2024	makushita 23	
Arawashi Tsuyoshi	Dulguun Erkhbayar (Эрхбаяр Дөлгөөн)	2002–2020	maegashira 2	
**Asahakuryū Tarō**	Ragchaa Jamintogtokh	2022–active	maegashira 8	
Asahiryū Katsuhiro	Denzensambu Batzorig	2016–2019	makushita 23	
**Asahifuji Hideki**	Battsetseg Ochirsaikhan	2024–active	jūryō 12	
Asahitaka Kōichi	Bat-Orgil Tserenchimed	1992–1993	sandanme 97	
Asasekiryū Tarō	Badarchiin Dashnyam	2000–2017	sekiwake	§
Asashōryū Akinori	Dolgorsürengiin Dagvadorj	1999–2010	68th yokozuna	
Azumaryū Tsuyoshi	Todbileg Sanduljav	2008–2024	maegashira 14	
Bontenshō Yūki	Naidan Bayarkhuu	2001–2003	jonidan 25	
**Chiyoshōma Fujio**	Ganbaatar Munkhsaikhan	2009–active	maegashira 2	‡
Daibanjaku Hisashi	Batsukh Khaidavmunkh	1999–2004	sandanme 10	
Daiōnami Masaru	Batbaatar Uuganbayar	2001–2016	makushita 33	
Daishōchi Kenta	Ulambayaryn Byambajav	2001–2005	makushita 15	
Daishōhō Kiyohiro	Shijirbayar Chimidregzen	2013–2026	maegashira 9	
Daitenshō Ken	Norjinkhand Ayurzana	2001–2010	makushita 7	
Daitenzan Noritaka	Ganbat Batzaya	2001–2005	makushita 58	
Daiyūbu Ryūsen	Davaadorj Undrakh	2001–2010	jūryō 10	
Dewahikari Tsutomuample	Ulziisuren Tsolmon	2002–2009	sandanme 3	
**Dewanoryū Kazuki**	Tumurbaatar Temuulen	2019–active	maegashira 14	
Fudōyama Subaru	Nyamjav Luvsandorj	2000–2008	sandanme 38	
Gōchōzan Masashi	Delgersaikhan Uuganbaatar	2006–2020	makushita 7	
**Gōseizan Minoru**	Baatar Munkh Od	2024–active	makushita 28	
Hakuba Takeshi	Ariunbayar Unurjargal	2000–2011	komusubi	
**Hakugetsuro Katsuyori**	Ariunerdene Sukhbat	2026–active	makushita 44	
Hakuhō Shō	Mönkhbatyn Davaajargal	2001–2021	69th yokozuna	§
Harumafuji Kōhei	Davaanyamyn Byambadorj	2001–2017	70th yokozuna	
Hokuseihō Osamu	Ariunaa Davaaninj	2020–2024	maegashira 6	# (Hokkaido)
**Hokutenkai Aoi**	Sukhbat Galdan	2019–active	makushita 5	
**Hokuto**	Narantuya Khuselbaatar	2026–active	jonidan 35	
Hokutomaru Akira	Nasanjargal Chinzorig	2018–2025	makushita 6	
Hoshihikari Shin'ichi	Duvchin Lhagva	2000–2011	jūryō 1	
Hoshikaze Yoshihiro	Bold Amarmend	2002–2011	jūryō 3	
Hoshizakura Aruta	Myagmar Altangerel	2000–2012	makushita 12	
**Hōshōryū Tomokatsu**	Sugarragchaa Byambasuren	2018–active	74th yokozuna	
Ichinojō Takashi	Altankhuyag Ichinnorov	2014–2023	sekiwake	
**Jōshōyū Atsushi**	Altangerel Sosorkhuu	2026–active	jonidan 7	
Kagamiō Hideoki	Nanjid Batkhuu	2003–2023	maegashira 9	
Kakuryū Rikisaburō	Mangaljalavyn Anand	2001–2021	71st yokozuna	§
**Kazenoumi Kei**	Bilguun Tsogoo	2022–active	makushita 18	
Kengō Shin	Turtuvshin Baatarkhuu	2010–2011	jonidan 63	
**Kirishima Tetsuo**	Lkhagvasuren Byambachuluun	2015–active	ōzeki	
Kitakasuga Ikkō	Munkhbat Tsolmonbayar	1999–2005	sandanme 18	
Kōryū Tadaharu	Erdene Munhk-Orgil	2000–2011	maegashira 11	
Kotokenryū Takeaki	Gantulga Bilguun	2022–2026	makushita 8	
Kyokujishi Masaru	Tumendemberel Losol	1992–1992	jonidan 59	
**Kyokukaiyū Ren**	Dalaibaatar Shagdarsuren	2023–active	maegashira 16	
Kyokusetsuzan Eiji	Munkhbold Sharaa	1992–1992	jonidan 91	
Kyokushūhō Kōki	Erdenebaatar Tumurbaatar	2007–2022	maegashira 4	
Kyokushūzan Noboru –	Davaagin Batbayar	1992–2006	komusubi	
Kyokutenhō Masaru	Nyamjavyn Tsevegnyam	1992–2015	sekiwake	§
Kyokutenzan Takeshi	Batmönkhiin Enkhbat	1992–2008	makushita 13	
Maenoyū Tarō	Gankhyag Naranbaatar	2004–2007	makushita 25	
Mitoryū Takayuki	Turbold Baasansuren	2017–2025	maegashira 13	
Mōkonami Sakae	Ganbold Bazarsad	2001–2011	maegashira 6	
Oniarashi Chikara	Ulziibayar Ulziijargal	2000–2014	jūryō 7	
**Ōnokatsu Kazuhiro**	Choijilsuren Batjargal	2023–active	maegashira 3	
**Ōshōma Degi**	Purevsuren Delgerbayar	2021–active	komusubi	
Ryūō Noboru	Erkhem-Ochiryn Sanchirbold	2000–2013	maegashira 8	
Ryūōnami Katsuteru	Battugs Buyanjargal	2010–2017	makushita 11	
**Sachinofuji Seiryū**	Ganzorig Origil	2022–active	makushita 59	# (Saitama)
**Sadanohikari Shinta**	Narantsogt Davaanyam	2014–active	makushita 14	
Sakigake Takeshi	Yagaanbaatar Battushig	2003–2022	jūryō 10	
Seirō Takeshi	Amgaa Unubold	2005–2020	maegashira 14	
Senhō Tsubasa	Tsubasa Hasegawa	2019–2024	sandanme 6	# (Aichi)
Senshō Hideki	Enkhbaatar Bayarbat	2001–2015	jūryō 14	
Shironoryū Yasumasa	Erdenetsogt Odgerel	2003–2013	jūryō 1	
Shōtenrō Taishi	Dagdandorj Nyamsuren	2001–2018	maegashira 2	§
Taiga Kishō	Sumiyabazar Sharbuyanhuu	2001–2014	makushita 19	
Takanoiwa Yoshimori	Adiya Baasandorj	2008–2018	maegashira 2	
**Tamashōhō Manpei**	Erdenebileg Enkhmanlai	2011–active	maegashira 16	
**Tamawashi Ichirō**	Batjargal Munkh-Orgil	2004–active	sekiwake	‡
**Tatsubayama Takashi**	Munkh-Erdene Buyantogtokh	2025–active	makushita 23	
**Tenrōsei Kenichi**	Serjbudee Luvsangombo	2024–active	makushita 39	
**Tenshoyama Shogo**	Ganbat Otogonbat	2024–active	makushita 1	
Terunofuji Haruo	Gantulga Gan-Erdene	2011–2025	73rd yokozuna	§
Tokinishiki Harunobu	Tsendsuren Tüshig	2022–2023	sandanme 85	
Tokisōma Baira	Ankhbayar Batbayar	2017–2024	makushita 25	
Tokitenkū Yoshiaki	Altangadasyn Khüchitbaatar	2002–2016	komusubi	§
Tokusegawa Masanao	Ganbold Badamsambuu	2003–2011	maegashira 1	
Toranoyama Kiyokazu	Ganbold Bat-Undral	2001–2009	sandanme 21	
**Toshinofuji Taisei**	Usukhbayar Demidjamts	2024–active	maegashira 13	
**Wakanofuji Hajime**	Tuvaadorj Bukhchuluun	2025–active	makushita 3	

=== Paraguay ===
Sumo name	Birth Name	Ethnicity	Years active	Highest rank
Wakashio	Satoshi Miyawaki	Japanese-Paraguayan	1985–1989	sandanme 76

=== Philippines ===
Sumo name	Birth Name	Ethnicity	Years active	Highest rank	Notes
**Furanshisu Manabu**	Teodoro Francis Robert Valles		2016–active	sandanme 52	
**Kōtokuzan Tarō**	Jasper Kenneth Arboladura Terai	Filipino-Japanese	2009–active	maegashira 16	# (Kanagawa)
**Kuwae Issei**	Pascual Justine France		2023–active	sandanme 14	# (Kanagawa)
Masunoyama Tomoharu	Tomoharu Kato	Filipino-Japanese	2006–2021	maegashira 4	# (Chiba)
**Mitakeumi Hisashi**	Ōmichi Hisashi	Filipino-Japanese	2015–active	ōzeki	# (Nagano)
Tamahikuni	Jun Terrado		1988–1988	jonokuchi 30	
Tamahinada	Angelito Labampa		1988–1988	jonidan 129	
Tamahiryū	Samson Pael		1988–1988	jonokuchi 2	

=== Russia ===
Sumo name	Birth Name	Region	Years active	Highest rank
Amūru Mitsuhiro	Nikolai Yuryevich Ivanov (Николай Юрьевич Иванов)	Primorsky Krai	2002–2018	maegashira 5
Aran Hakutora	Alan Gabaraev	North Ossetia-Alania	2007–2013	sekiwake
Hakurozan Yūta	Batraz Feliksovich Baradzov	North Ossetia-Alania	2002–2008	maegashira 2
Ōrora Satoshi	Anatoliy Valeryevich Mikhakhanov	Buryatia	2000–2018	makushita 43
**Rōga Tokiyoshi**	Amartuvshin Amarsanaa	Tuva	2018–active	maegashira 5
Rohō Yukio	Soslan Feliksovich Baradzov	North Ossetia-Alania	2002–2008	komusubi
Wakanohō Toshinori	Soslan Aleksandrovich Gagloev	North Ossetia-Alania	2005–2008	maegashira 1

NOTE: prior to the end of WWII, the southern half of Sakhalin was controlled by Japan as Karafuto. For a Karafuto-born wrestler, see Japanese-born rikishi of non-Japanese or mixed ethnicity.

=== Samoa ===
Sumo name	Birth Name	Years active	Highest rank
Nankairyū Tarō	Saba Kiriful	1984–1988	maegashira 2
Nanyōzakura	Faaleva Fofoga	1984–1988	makushita 48

NOTE: Rikishi from American Samoa and Hawaiians of Samoan descent are listed under the United States heading.

=== Sri Lanka ===
Sumo name	Birth Name	Years active	Highest rank
Tochitaikai Jirō	Sri Aminda de Perera	1992–1992	jonokuchi 34

=== Japanese-occupied Taiwan ===
Sumo name	Birth Name	Years active	Highest rank
Shintakayama Ichirō	Toh ûi-iok (Taku Iyaku)	1940-1946	makushita 15

=== Taiwan ===
Sumo name	Birth Name	Years active	Highest rank
Eigayama Hiromasa	Zhi-min Zeng	1986–1993	makushita 32
Kahō Fumio	Pengwen Chen	1989–1990	jonidan 55
Maedaikō Ichirō	Haolun Xu	1988–1995	sandanme 16
Maenoumi Takeo	Jiancheng Liao	1989–1991	sandanme 36
Ōhayama Yoshio	Kunfang Xie	1990–1995	makushita 53
Rakōten Keigō	Qigang Zhen	1990–1991	jonidan 106
Shū	Jianyan Zhou	1988–1991	jonidan 5
Tamayama	Akira Yokone	1966–1972	sandanme 75
Tatsunohana Ritsuei	Lirong Chen	1989–1994	makushita 45
Tochinohana Chōō	Chao-huei Liu	1980–1988	jūryō 4
Tominohana	Jiawei Ding	1988–1992	jonidan 31

=== Tonga ===
Sumo name	Birth Name	Years active	Highest rank
Aotsurugi Kenta	Tebita Rato Taufa	2001–2009	sandanme 1
Fukunoshima Hiroshi	onga Uli'uli Fifita	1974–1977	makushita 27
Hinodeshima	Sioeli Latu Vaivaka	1974–1976	sandanme 34
Minaminoshima Isamu	Minaminoshima Isamu Falevai	2001–2008	makushita 21
Minaminoshima Takeshi	Tevita Vaiola Falevai	1974–1976	makushita 37
Sachinoshima	Sione Havea Vailahi	1975–1976	sandanme 36
Tomonoshima Naoyuki	Viri Manulea Fifita	1975–1976	jonidan 18
Yashinoshima Noboru	Moleni Fe'aomoeata Tauki'uvea	1974–1976	makushita 53

=== Ukraine ===
Sumo name	Birth Name	Years active	Highest rank
**Aonishiki Arata**	Danylo Yavhusishyn (Данило Явгусішин)	2023–active	ōzeki
**Shishi Masaru**	Serhii Sokolovskyi (Сергій Соколовський)	2020–active	maegashira 9

=== United Kingdom ===
Sumo name	Birth Name	Region	Years active	Highest rank
**Eisei**	Nicholas George Tarasenko	England	2026–active	jonidan 83
Hidenokuni Hajime	Nathan John Strange	England	1989–1990	jonidan 89
Seikō	Koo Chun Pong	British Hong Kong	1987–1989	jonidan 88

=== United States ===
Sumo name	Birth Name	Ethnicity	State/Region	Years active	Highest rank	Notes
Akebono Tarō	Chadwick George Ha'aheo Rowan	Hawaiian	Hawaii	1988–2001	64th yokozuna	§
Araiwa Kamenosuke	Cal Lee Martin		California	1968–1971	makushita 33	
Daiki Susumu	Percy Pomaikai Kipapa	Hawaiian	Hawaii	1991–1998	jūryō 10	
Gōsetsu	Raymond Roland Lyman		Hawaii	1982–1983	sandanme 86	
**Hikarumusashi Eru**	Daniel Ailua	Samoan	Hawaii	2024–active	sandanme 42	
Hiraga Shōji	Shoji Hiraga	Japanese-American	California	1934–1938	jonidan 23	
Junyō	Isaac Faaili Tago Roe	Samoan	Hawaii	1983–1983	jonidan 132	
Kagamifuji	Jason Michael Walker		Texas	2002–2003	jonokuchi 23	
Kamikiiwa Ryūta	Wayne Mahelani Vierra Jr.	Hawaiian	Hawaii	1990–1991	sandanme 22	
Konishiki Yasokichi	Saleva'a Fuauli Atisano'e	Samoan	Hawaii	1984–1997	ōzeki	§
Kōryū Katsuichi	Eric Cosier Gaspar		Hawaii	1990–1997	makushita 49	
Matsuryūyama Masao	Robert Masao Suetsugu	Japanese-American	Washington	1975–1985	makushita 24	
Muryū (alternate reading: Yumeryū) Masaru (previously Wakanonada Masaru)	John Robert Collins		Hawaii	1976–1981	makushita 55	Born in Camp Zama (Kanagawa)
Musashibō Benkei	William Molina		Hawaii	1987–1988	jonidan 59	
Musashikuni Mamu	Fiamalu Musashimaru Penitani (II)	Samoan	Hawaii	2013–2019	makushita 26	
Musashimaru Kōyō	Fiamalu Penitani (I)	Samoan-Tongan	American Samoa	1989–2004	67th yokozuna	§
Nanfū Kenzō	Pierson Kaleo Kekauoha	Hawaiian	Hawaii	1990–1996	makushita 1	
Nanyonishiki Jiro	Jeremiah Peter Onosai	Samoan	Hawaii	1989–1990	sandanme 24	
Narushio	Emanuel Kaefaia Jr.		Hawaii	1983–1984	jonidan 23	
Ōzora Hiroshi	Troy Levi Talaimatai	Samoan	Hawaii	1989–1995	makushita 13	
Sentoryū Henri	Henry Armstrong Miller	Japanese-American	Missouri	1988–2003	maegashira 12	Born in Tokyo
Shinnishiki	Vincent Devoux		California	1988–1990	sandanme 10	
Sunahama Shōji	William Tyler Hopkins		Hawaii	1990–1997	jūryō 5	
**Sunamusashi**	Masahiro Sunada Hopkins	Japanese-American	Hawaii	2026–active	jonokuchi 19	# (Toyko)
Taikai Tsutomu	George Leiola Rowan		Hawaii	1989–1989	jonokuchi 39	
Takamiō Daisei	Sione (John) Tekeriri Feleunga	Tongan	Hawaii	1986–1997	makushita 2	
Takamishū Daikichi	Taylor Tuli Wily	Samoan	Hawaii	1987–1989	makushita 2	
Takamiyama Daigorō	Jesse James Wailani Kuhaulua	Hawaiian	Hawaii	1964–1984	sekiwake	§
Takanoumi	Phillip Smoak		Texas	1981–1981	jonokuchi 29	
Tamaasahi (prev. Tamakiyama)	George Isomura	Japanese-American	Hawaii	1965–1975	makushita 23	
Toyonishiki Kiichiro	Harley Kiichiro Ozaki	Japanese-American	Colorado	1936–1944	maegashira 20	
Wakachikara Tōru	Glenn Haywood Kalima		Hawaii	1991–1994	makushita 26	
Wakaichirō Ken	Ichiro Kendrick Young	Japanese-American	Texas	2016–2020	sandanme 32	
Wakatakami Tarō	George Pulaian		Hawaii	1977–1983	makushita 40	
Wakayashima Masaki	Asato Reid	Japanese-American	Hawaii	1976–1978	sandanme 32	
Yamamoto Tatsumi	Edward Tatsumi Yamamoto	Japanese-American	California	1988–1988	jonokuchi 44	
Yamato Gō	George Haywood Kalima		Hawaii	1990–1997	maegashira 12	

== See also ==
- List of Mongolian sumo wrestlers
- List of active sumo wrestlers
- List of past sumo wrestlers
