= Tagonoura stable (2000–2012) =

Defunct sumo stable

Tagonoura stable (田子ノ浦部屋, Tagonoura-beya) (2000–2012) was a sumo stable of the Nishonoseki group.

It was established in February 2000 by former maegashira Kushimaumi, who branched off from Dewanoumi stable. It was located in the Koto ward of Tokyo. In 2012 it had eight sumo wrestlers.

Tagonoura did not recruit any wrestlers from Nihon University, despite his own amateur sumo background there, and though he did recruit foreigners he avoided the most common sources such as Hawaii and Mongolia, instead taking in the Tongan Hisanoumi in 2001, and later the Bulgarian Aoiyama (Daniel Ivanov) who became the stable's first sekitori and reached the rank of maegashira 7 in January 2012.

The stable suffered a number of setbacks, including Tagonoura's heart attack in 2003, the death of a 17-year-old sandanme wrestler in 2004 and the death of a yobidashi in 2008. Following the death of Tagonoura in February 2012 the stable was dissolved, with half the wrestlers going to Dewanoumi stable and the other half, including Aoiyama, going to Kasugano stable.

== Ring name conventions ==
Many wrestlers from this stable took shikona that begin with the character 碧 (read: aoi), meaning blue. Examples include Aoiyama, Aokishin and Aozora.

== Owner ==
- 2000–2012: 14th: Tagonoura Keihito (maegashira Kushimaumi)

== Notable wrestlers ==
- Aoiyama
- Aotsurugi (aka Hisanoumi)

== See also ==
- List of sumo stables
- List of sumo elders
- List of active sumo wrestlers
- List of past sumo wrestlers
- List of years in sumo
- Glossary of sumo terms
