= Kaisei Ichirō =

Brazilian sumo wrestler

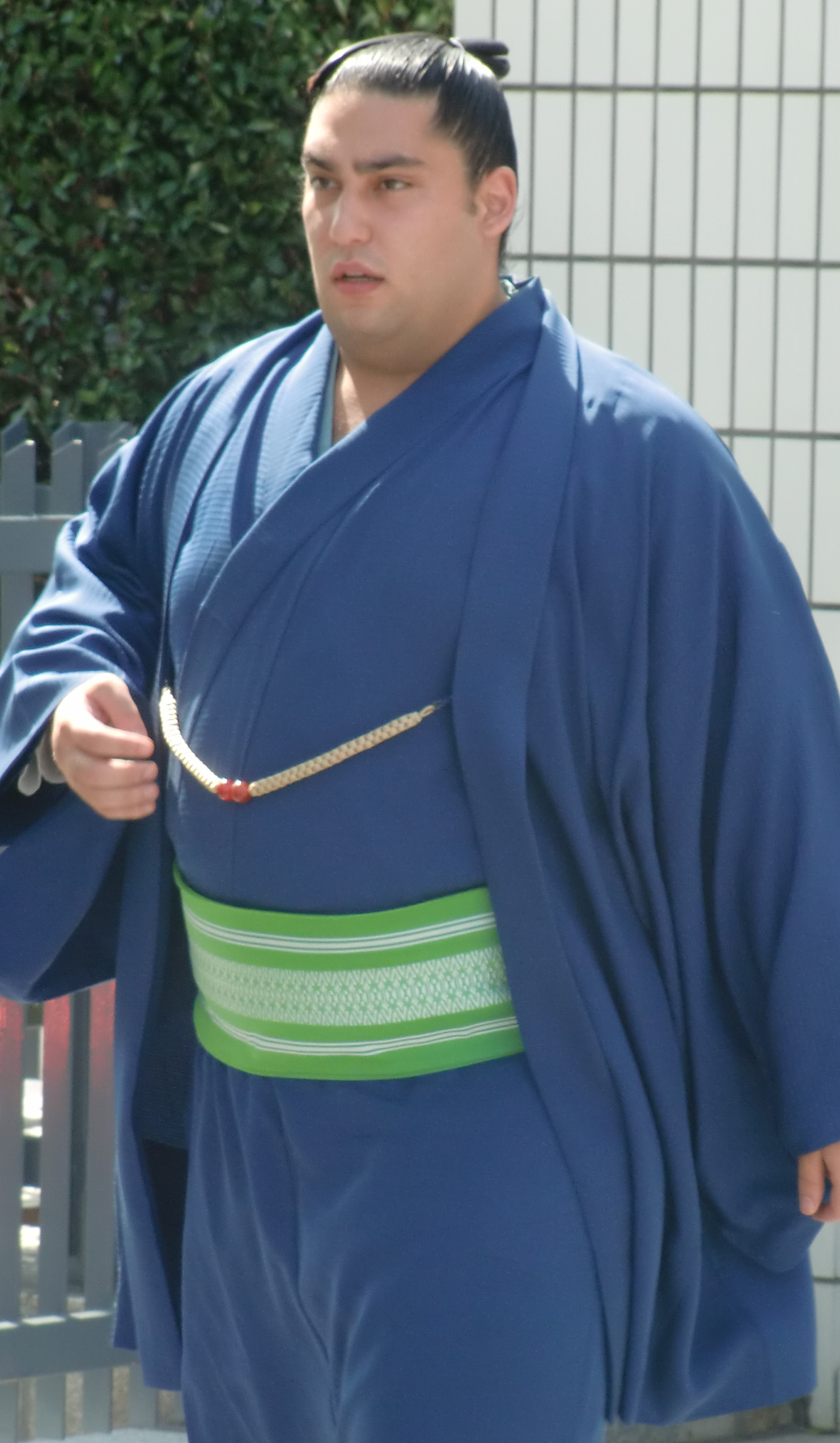
- Kaisei in 2010

Personal information
- Native name: 魁聖 一郎
- Born: Ricardo Sugano; December 18, 1986 (age 39) São Paulo, Brazil
- Height: 1.95 m (6 ft 5 in)
- Weight: 190 kg (420 lb; 30 st)

Sport
- Sport: Sumo
- Retired: September 2022
- Heya: Ōshima
- Record: 590-592-37
- Debut: September 2006
- Highest rank: Sekiwake (July 2016)
- Elder name: Tomozuna
- Championships: 1 (Jūryō)
- Special Prizes: Fighting Spirit (3)
- Updated on 29 August 2022

Kaisei Ichirō (Japanese: 魁聖 一郎; born December 18, 1986 as Ricardo Sugano (菅野 リカルド, Sugano Rikarudo)) is sumo elder Tomozuna, an Asakayama stable coach from São Paulo, Brazil. A third generation Japanese Brazilian, Kaisei made his debut in September 2006 and reached the top makuuchi division in May 2011. His highest rank was sekiwake. He was runner-up twice, once in the July 2013 tournament and another in the March 2018 tournament. He received three Fighting Spirit prizes.

== Early life and sumo background ==
In his childhood, unlike his friends Sugano had no interest at all in football, not even watching games on TV. He was more interested in grappling sports, such as judo, which he practiced for a time. When he was sixteen a friend of his father's suggested that his already large size would be very suitable for sumo. Sugano used to train in many sumo clubs in São Paulo, where he ended up meeting the retired rikishi Wakaazuma Yoshinobu, who is also Brazilian. Yoshinobu would strictly train him, knowing that as Sugano wanted to become a professional sumo wrestler, he should be severe on Ricardo's training. Despite the difficulties, he continued to go on the trainings and commented about his dream of becoming a rikishi, as he was not able to see another career path he could take in Brazil. He began pursuing sumo and went on to win the All Brazil amateur sumo championship in the free weight category. At this time he believed that, at least in Brazilian amateur sumo, all one needed was size and power to win, and decided to travel to Japan to try out sumo. He was introduced to Tomozuna stable by Wakaazuma and joined the stable in 2006. The stable was already home to another Brazilian wrestler, Kaishin. He was given the shikona or ring name of Kaisei Ichirō. Ichirō was the name of Kaisei's late grandfather, who was Japanese.

== Career ==
Kaisei moved through the lower divisions quickly, reaching the fourth highest sandanme division in March 2007. He was promoted to the third makushita division after the March 2008 tournament, but then his progress stalled somewhat. He came through the September 2009 tournament undefeated (although he lost a playoff for the yūshō to Gagamaru) and in July 2010 became a sekitori by earning promotion to jūryō. He was the fourth Brazilian to make the jūryō division after Ryūkō, Kuniazuma and Wakaazuma, but Kaisei was to surpass all of them by winning promotion to the top makuuchi division. After winning the jūryō division yūshō in November 2010 with an 11–4 record, he followed up with an 8–7 at jūryō 1 in January 2011, which saw him reach maegashira 16 in the May Technical Examination tournament.

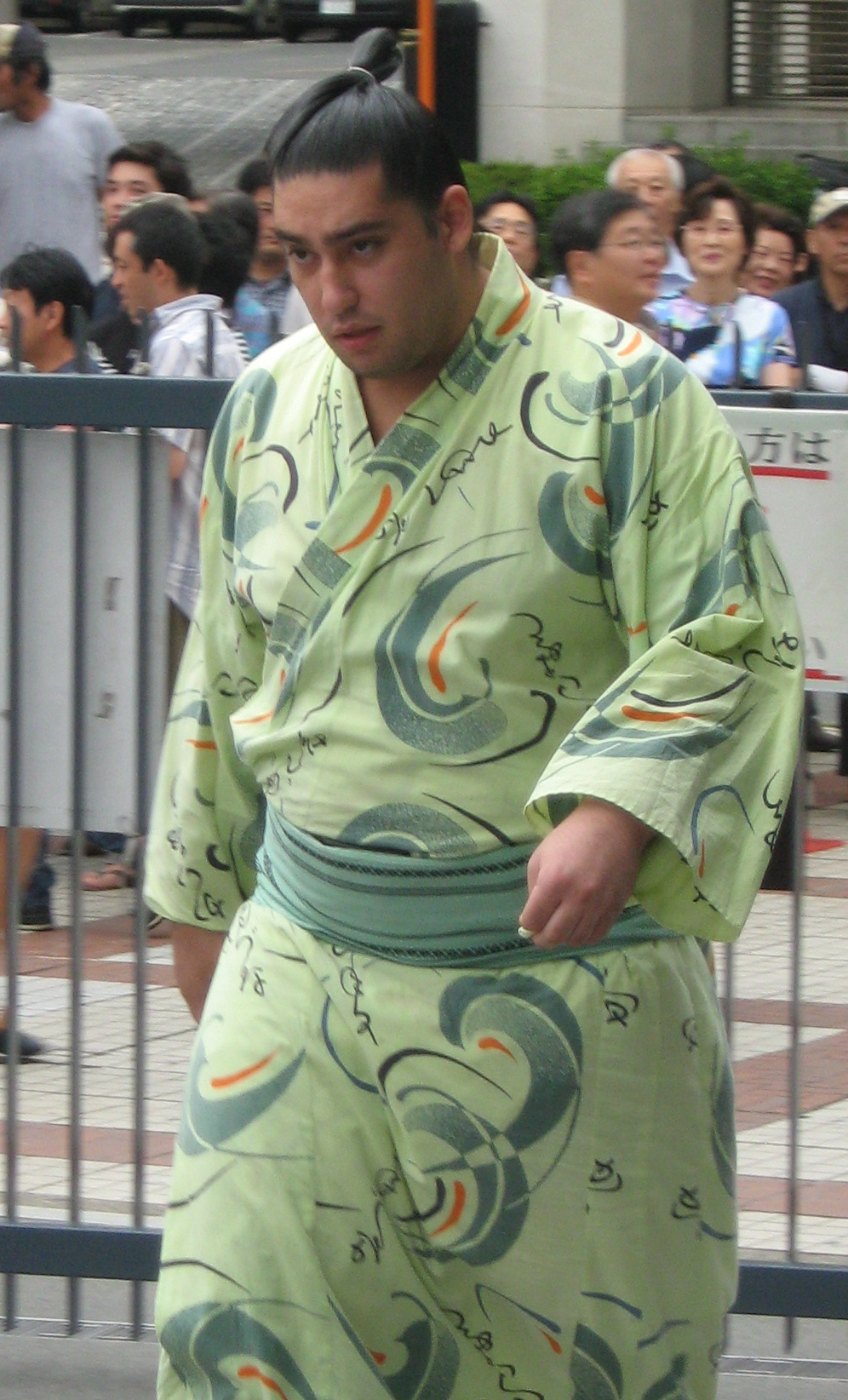
Kaisei while at the unsalaried ranks in September 2008

Kaisei won his first six bouts in his makuuchi debut, the first makuuchi debutant to do so since Takanonami in 1991. He went on to 8–0, the first to achieve that since Sadanoumi in 1980, and 9–0, running neck and neck with yokozuna Hakuhō, before suffering his first defeat to Tochinoshin on Day 10. He thus failed to emulate the great Taihō, who reached 11–0 in 1960. Nevertheless, his final score of 10–5 saw him win the Fighting Spirit Award. He was also given the honour of serving as Hakuhō's tsuyuharai, or dew sweeper, during the yokozuna's ring entering ceremony.

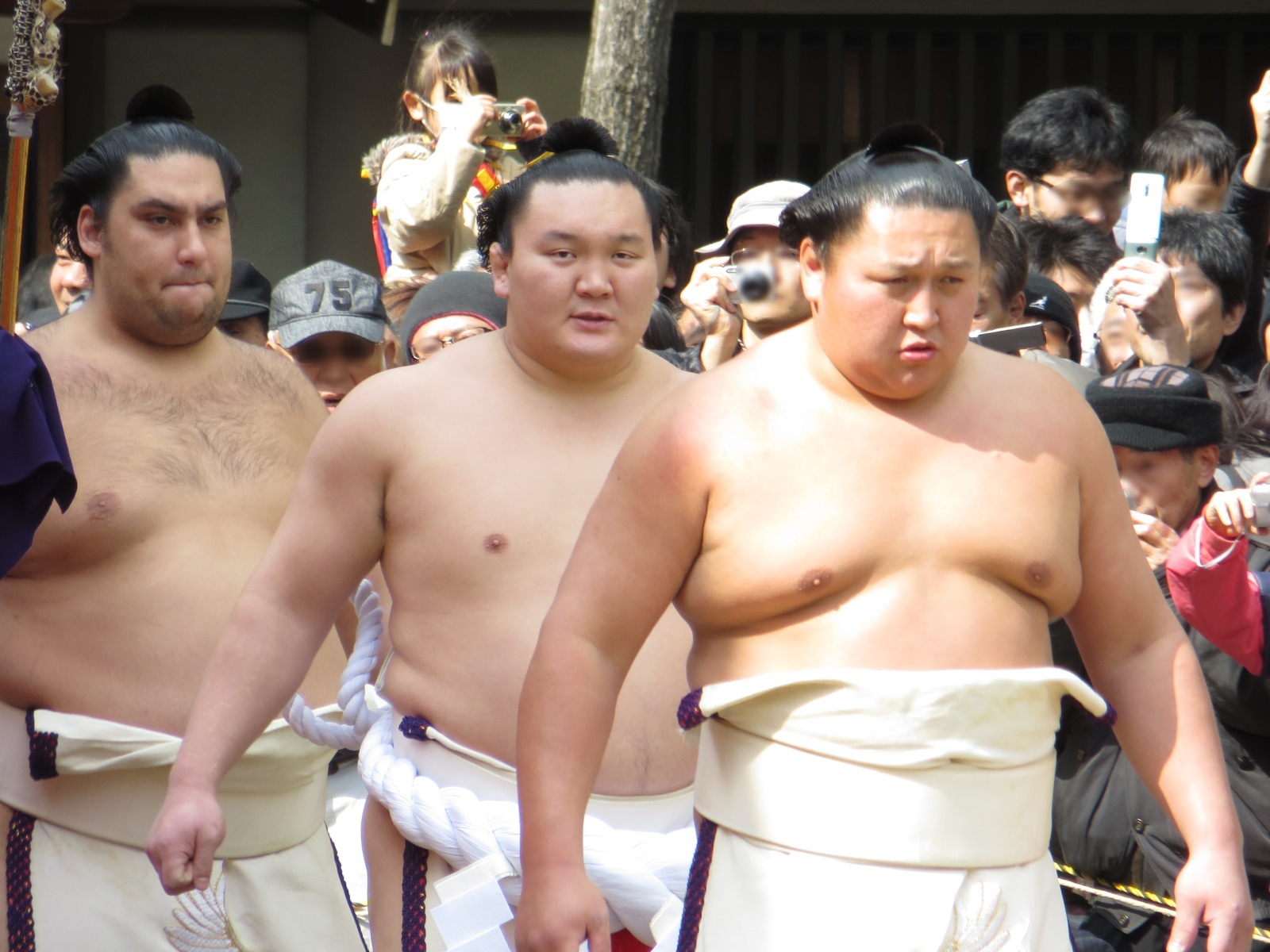
Kaisei with Hakuhō and stablemate Kyokutenhō at the Sumiyoshi taisha in March 2012.

He was promoted to maegashira 5 for the July tournament, where he recovered from 1–4 to go to 6–4, but then lost his last five matches to finish on 6–9. With the intai-zumo (retirement from sumo) of ōzeki Kaiō during the same tournament Kaisei become the heyagashira (the highest ranked wrestler) at Tomozuna stable. Disappointing scores of 4–11 and 6–9 in September and November 2011 saw him fall to the bottom of the division. A 5–10 record in the January 2012 tournament meant he suffered demotion to jūryō in March, but he produced a 10–5 record in Osaka, ensuring a return to makuuchi. In July 2012 he scored eleven wins, picking up his second Fighting Spirit Award and earning promotion to maegashira 1. In September he just fell short with a 7–8 record, losing to Hōmashō on the final day. Since then he has largely alternated winning and losing tournaments. Though he has proven his longevity in the top division, it remains to be seen whether he can achieve more consistent performances. He was not able to defeat a yokozuna even after 37 attempts.

Kaisei made his san'yaku debut in the May 2016 tournament, having been promoted to komusubi on the back of an 11–4 record from the rank of maegashira 7. He is the second wrestler from Tomozuna stable to reach komusubi since the present stablemaster took over in 1989 and the first since Kaiō in 1994. After coming through with an 8–7 record he earned immediate promotion to sekiwake for the following July tournament. In the last three tournaments of 2016 he posted losing records and dropped to maegashira 9 before recording an 8–7 in January 2017.

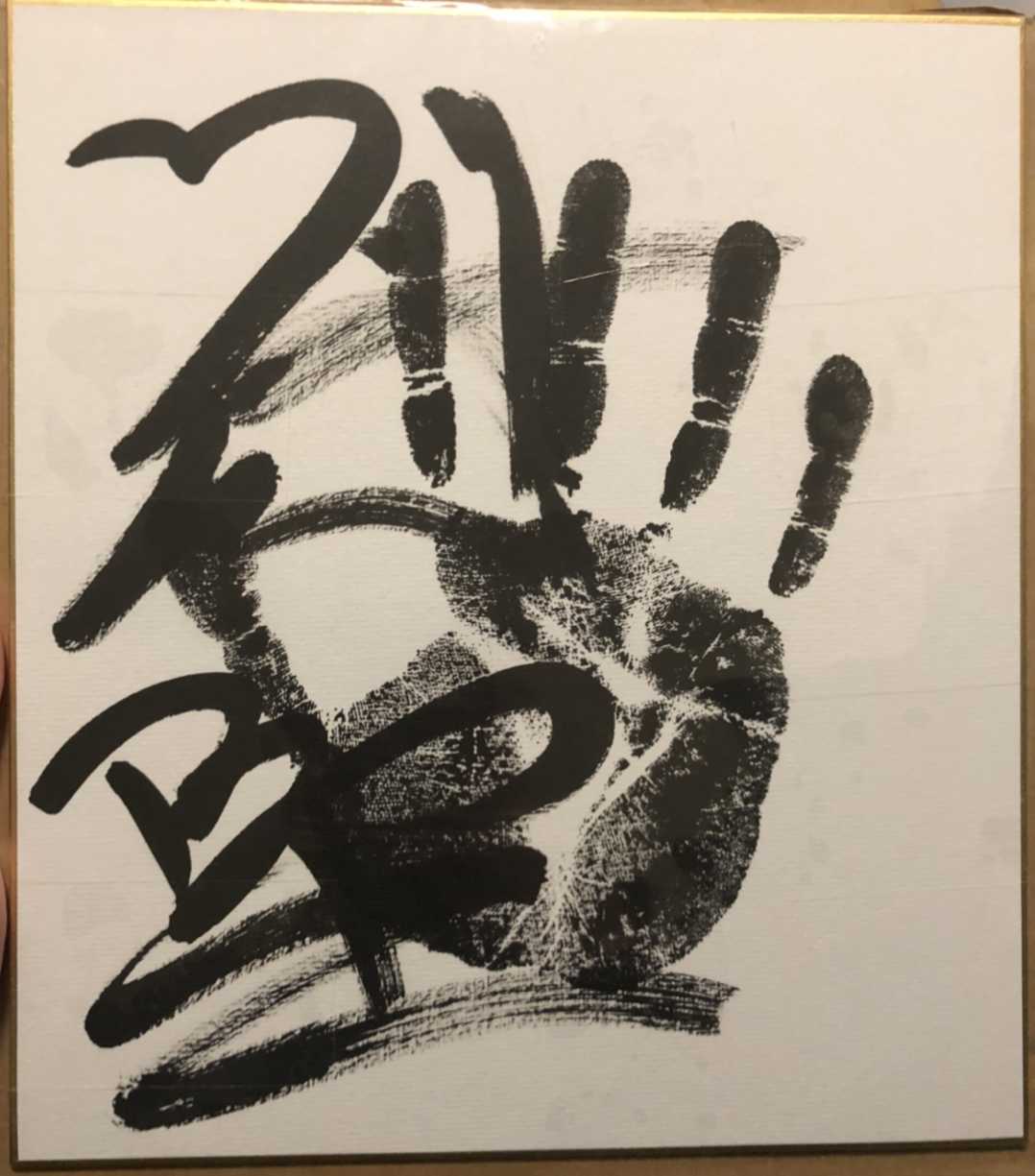
Tegata (hand print autograph) of Kaisei

He injured his knee training with Hakuhō shortly before the March 2017 tournament and had to withdraw from a honbasho for the first time in his career, bringing to an end his run of 739 consecutive matches from debut, the most among active top division wrestlers. He was demoted to the jūryō division for the first time since 2012 after the May 2017 tournament, but made an immediate return to makuuchi after scoring 10–5 at the rank of jūryō 1 in July. In the September 2017 tournament, at West Maegashira #13, he managed to get a record of 9–6. Being promoted to East Maegashira #10 for the November 2017 tournament, Kaisei finished with a record of 8–7. In January 2018, at West Maegashira #8, Kaisei finished 8–7. The March 2018 Tournament saw Kaisei promoted to East Maegashira #6 where he won his first 9 matches, only to lose to Ichinojo on day 10. On day 13 Kaisei was brought up to face yokozuna Kakuryu where he lost. Kaisei finished off the tournament with a 12–3 record, being a runner-up to Kakuryu, with fellow runner-up Takayasu. This marks the second time that Kaisei was runner-up. Kaisei also got the Fighting Spirit Prize, his third time claiming that prize.

In November 2018 Kaisei returned to the sanyaku ranks at komusubi for the first time in 13 tournaments. However, he was restricted by a left calf injury suffered in training shortly before the tournament, missing the first two days and then withdrawing on Day 14 with only three wins, after aggravating the injury. He was also forced to withdraw from the May 2019 tournament after injuring his right bicep tendon against Ryūden on Day 7. Fighting at maegashira 15 in July, he injured his right arm and eventually withdrew on Day 11 with only one win, resulting in his demotion to jūryō. He returned to the top division after an 11–4 record in November 2019. He was forced to sit out the January 2021 tournament after a wrestler at Tomozuna stable tested positive for COVID-19.

== Retirement from sumo ==
In July 2022, while ranked at the bottom of the second division, Kaisei finished the tournament with a 5-10 record, which demoted him back to the unsalaried third division after more than 12 years in the salaried top two divisions. Kaisei ultimately retired in late August 2022. Kaisei obtained Japanese citizenship in November 2014, which allowed him to acquire an elder-stock when retiring; he now uses the name Tomozuna oyakata. He originally worked as a coach at his stable, now re-named Ōshima stable, until May 2023 when he transferred to Asakayama stable.

Kaisei's danpatsu-shiki (retirement ceremony) was held on 1 October 2023 at the Ryōgoku Kokugikan before invited guests. About 340 people took turns in the ceremonial snipping of Kaisei's ōichōmage. The final cut was made by former ōzeki Kaiō, the master of the stable Kaisei transferred to after his retirement. Kaisei's mother Rosana, younger brother Renato and sister Natalia made the approximately 30-hour trip from Brazil to Japan to attend the ceremony.

== Family ==
Kaisei announced in July 2020 that he had got married the previous month to a woman in her 20s after a five year relationship.

== Fighting style ==
Kaisei's favoured techniques are listed at the Sumo Association as migi-yotsu (a left hand outside, right hand inside grip on the opponent's mawashi), yori (forcing) and oshi (pushing). His most common winning kimarite are straightforward: yori-kiri (force out) and oshi dashi (push out).

== Career record ==
Kaisei Ichirō
Year	January Hatsu basho, Tokyo	March Haru basho, Osaka	May Natsu basho, Tokyo	July Nagoya basho, Nagoya	September Aki basho, Tokyo	November Kyūshū basho, Fukuoka
2006	x	x	x	x	(Maezumo)	West Jonokuchi #35; 6–1
2007	West Jonidan #66; 6–1	West Sandanme #96; 4–3	West Sandanme #75; 6–1	West Sandanme #18; 2–5	West Sandanme #42; 3–4	West Sandanme #56; 3–4
2008	East Sandanme #69; 6–1	West Sandanme #14; 5–2	West Makushita #52; 5–2	West Makushita #35; 4–3	West Makushita #29; 2–5	East Makushita #50; 3–4
2009	West Makushita #60; 3–4	East Sandanme #15; 5–2	West Makushita #52; 5–2	East Makushita #31; 2–5	West Makushita #46; 7–0–P	West Makushita #6; 3–4
2010	East Makushita #10; 5–2	West Makushita #5; 5–2	West Makushita #2; 5–2	East Jūryō #12; 8–7	East Jūryō #4; 7–8	East Jūryō #6; 11–4–PP; Champion
2011	East Jūryō #1; 8–7	West Maegashira #16; Tournament Cancelled; Match fixing investigation 0–0–0	West Maegashira #16; 10–5; F	East Maegashira #5; 6–9	East Maegashira #8; 4–11	East Maegashira #14; 6–9
2012	East Maegashira #16; 5–10	West Jūryō #4; 10–5	East Maegashira #12; 9–6	West Maegashira #8; 11–4; F	West Maegashira #1; 7–8	West Maegashira #2; 7–8
2013	West Maegashira #3; 6–9	West Maegashira #5; 3–12	East Maegashira #14; 8–7	East Maegashira #12; 11–4	West Maegashira #4; 7–8	West Maegashira #5; 7–8
2014	West Maegashira #6; 8–7	East Maegashira #3; 6–9	East Maegashira #6; 8–7	East Maegashira #3; 5–10	West Maegashira #6; 8–7	East Maegashira #4; 7–8
2015	East Maegashira #5; 7–8	West Maegashira #6; 5–10	East Maegashira #11; 10–5	West Maegashira #3; 6–9	West Maegashira #5; 6–9	East Maegashira #7; 9–6
2016	West Maegashira #3; 5–10	West Maegashira #7; 11–4	East Komusubi #1; 8–7	East Sekiwake #1; 7–8	East Komusubi #1; 6–9	East Maegashira #2; 3–12
2017	East Maegashira #9; 8–7	East Maegashira #8; 3–7–5	West Maegashira #15; 7–8	East Jūryō #1; 10–5	West Maegashira #13; 9–6	East Maegashira #10; 8–7
2018	West Maegashira #8; 8–7	East Maegashira #6; 12–3; F	West Maegashira #1; 6–9	East Maegashira #4; 9–6	West Maegashira #1; 8–7	West Komusubi #1; 3–9–3
2019	East Maegashira #8; 10–5	East Maegashira #1; 3–12	East Maegashira #8; 3–5–7	West Maegashira #15; 1–10–4	East Jūryō #8; 9–6	East Jūryō #5; 11–4–PP
2020	West Maegashira #16; 8–7	East Maegashira #14; 8–7	East Maegashira #10; Tournament Cancelled; State of Emergency; 0–0–0	East Maegashira #10; 6–9	West Maegashira #12; 7–8	West Maegashira #12; 6–9
2021	East Maegashira #16; Sat out due to COVID rules 0–0–15	East Maegashira #16; 8–7	East Maegashira #15; 9–6	East Maegashira #11; 6–9	East Maegashira #14; 6–9	East Maegashira #17; 7–8
2022	West Maegashira #17; 5–7–3	East Jūryō #3; 4–11	West Jūryō #9; 6–9	East Jūryō #11; 5–10	East Makushita #1; Retired –	x
Record given as wins–losses–absences Top division champion Top division runner-up Retired Lower divisions Non-participation Sanshō key: F=Fighting spirit; O=Outstanding performance; T=Technique Also shown: ★=Kinboshi; P=Playoff(s); Divisions: Makuuchi — Jūryō — Makushita — Sandanme — Jonidan — Jonokuchi Makuuchi ranks: Yokozuna — Ōzeki — Sekiwake — Komusubi — Maegashira

== See also ==
- List of sumo tournament top division runners-up
- List of sumo tournament second division champions
- Glossary of sumo terms
- List of heaviest sumo wrestlers
- List of non-Japanese sumo wrestlers
- List of sekiwake
