= Aoiyama Kōsuke =

Japanese sumo wrestler

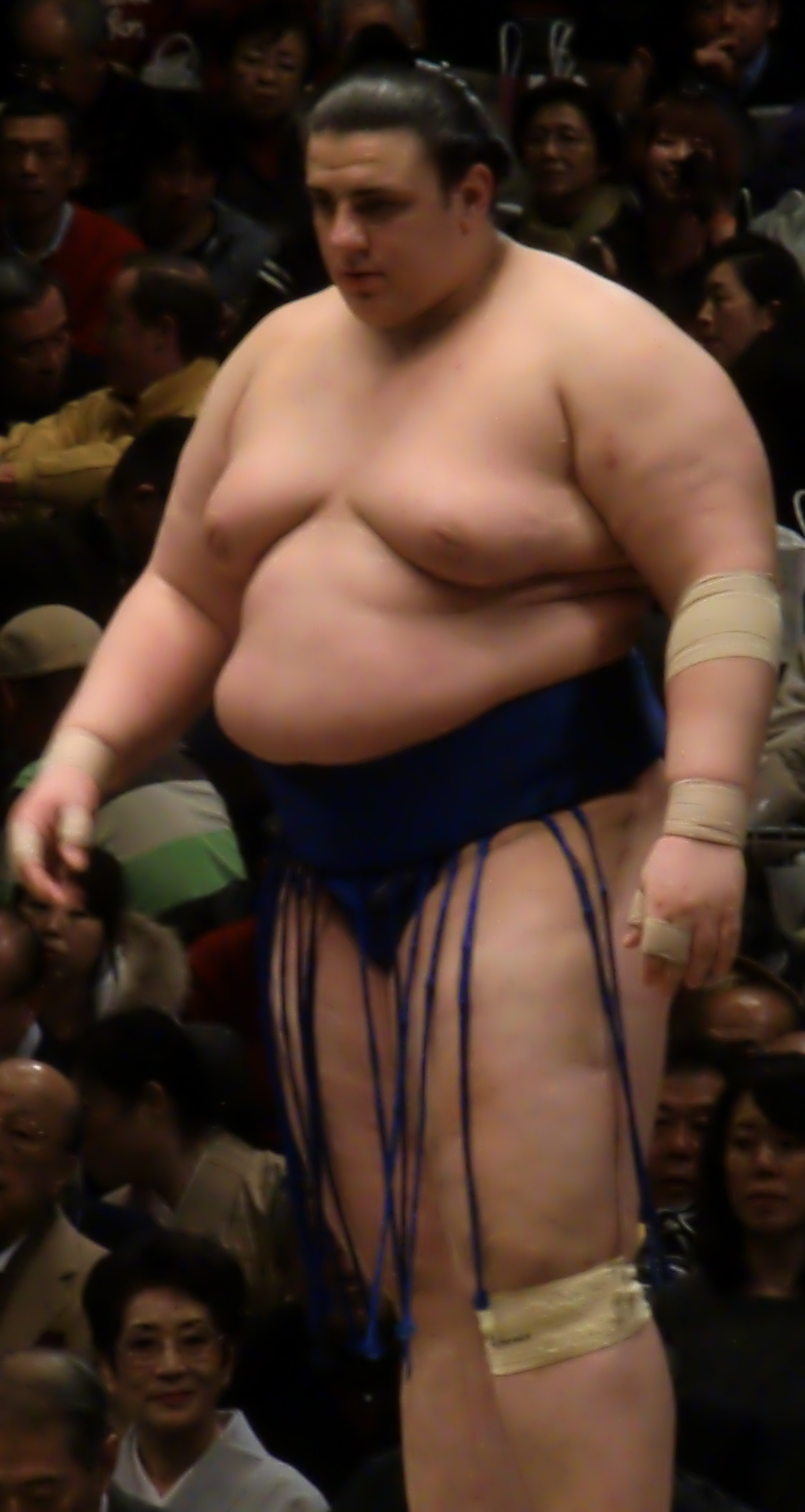
- Aoiyama in the January 2012 tournament

Personal information
- Native name: 碧山 亘右
- Born: Daniel Ivanov; 19 June 1986 (age 40) Elhovo, Bulgaria
- Height: 1.91 m (6 ft 3 in)
- Weight: 181 kg (399 lb; 28.5 st)

Sport
- Sport: Sumo
- Retired: September 2024
- Heya: Tagonoura → Kasugano
- Record: 613-607-35
- Debut: July 2009
- Highest rank: Sekiwake (November 2014)
- Elder name: Iwatomo
- Championships: 1 (Makushita); 1 (Jonidan); 1 (Jonokuchi)
- Special Prizes: Fighting Spirit (4); Technique (1)
- Gold Stars: 1 (Harumafuji)

Aoiyama Kōsuke (Japanese: 碧山 亘右; born 19 June 1986 as Daniel Ivanov (Bulgarian: Даниел Иванов)) is a Japanese former professional sumo wrestler or rikishi from Elhovo, Bulgaria. He made his professional debut in 2009, reaching the top division two years later, debuting in the November 2011 tournament. Aoiyama has won four Fighting Spirit awards, one Technique award and one kinboshi for defeating a yokozuna. He was twice runner-up in a tournament. His highest rank was sekiwake. Aoiyama was one of the heaviest competitors in sumo, weighing around 200 kg for most tournaments. In March 2022, he obtained Japanese citizenship.

== Early life and sumo background ==
After wrestling for ten years and doing amateur sumo for three, he entered the professional sumo world at the introduction of fellow countryman ōzeki Kotoōshū, becoming only the second Bulgarian rikishi. He joined Tagonoura stable, run by former maegashira Kushimaumi. When asked by his coach whether he preferred mountains or rivers, he chose mountains and so was given the shikona Aoiyama, meaning "blue mountain".

== Career ==
=== Early career ===
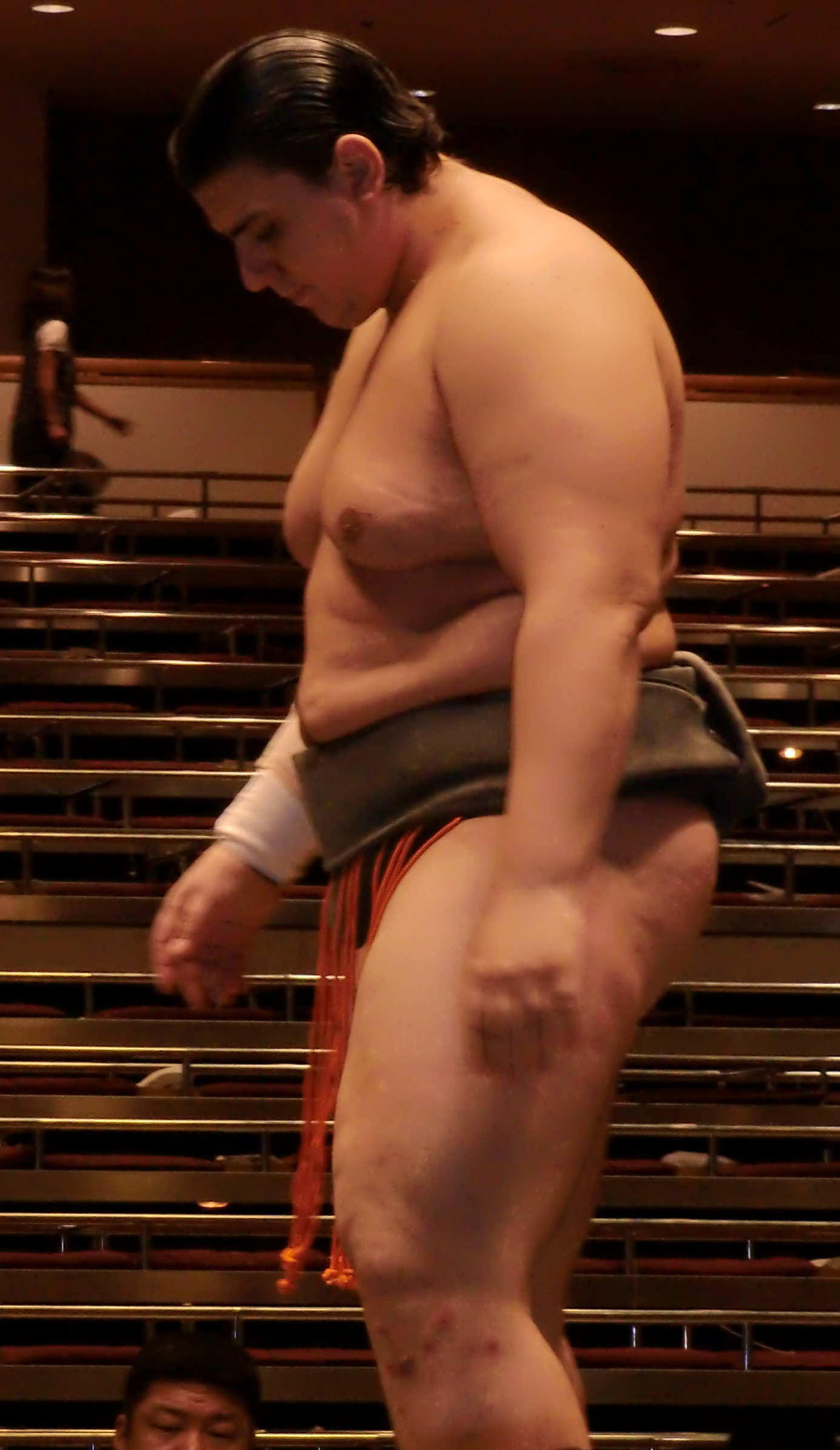
Aoiyama in his debut tournament

In his professional debut as Aoiyama Kiyohito in the September 2009 tournament, he won the jonokuchi championship with a perfect 7–0 record. He subsequently changed his name to Aoiyama Kōsuke for his jonidan debut in the following November tournament, which he also won with a 7–0 record followed by a playoff win against the sole Kazakhstani wrestler Kazafuzan. In the following January 2010 tournament at sandanme he finally lost his first bout, having won all of his previous 16 matches. This would be his only loss though, and his 6–1 record was enough to propel him into the makushita division in the following March tournament. He again posted a perfect record and took the makushita championship. His meteoric rise would slow starting with his next tournament however. He managed only two wins in his next makushita tournament. This was his first losing tournament. In contrast to his previous successes, he struggled somewhat for several more tournaments at this level. He eventually had enough winning tournaments in upper makushita to allow his promotion into the professional jūryō ranks for the July 2011 tournament. He was promoted to the high rank of jūryō 4 due to the high number of vacancies left by wrestlers forced to retire due to involvement in match-fixing. At this high level he only managed a 7–8 record and moved down two ranks to jūryō 6 for the following September tournament. Suffering from a herniated disc, he was forced to sit out the first two days of the tournament, but managed to make a remarkable recovery and pulled out an impressive 10–3 record for his remaining bouts of the tournament.

=== Makuuchi career ===
Aoiyama's record was enough to allow him promotion to the top makuuchi division for November 2011. He posted an impressive 11–4 record and received a Fighting Spirit award for his efforts. He did, however, share this record with his rival, Wakakōyū having lost to him on the final day of the tournament.

In February 2012 Aoiyama's stablemaster died and Tagonoura stable was dissolved, with Aoiyama moving to the affiliated Kasugano stable. After an 8–7 score in the March tournament, he reached his highest rank to date of maegashira 6 in the May tournament, where he produced a fine 11–4 record. In the July tournament he faced all the top ranked wrestlers for the first time. Although he was 1–6 down after seven days, he recovered to clinch his kachi-koshi on the final day. In September he made his san'yaku debut at komusubi, which was just 18 tournaments after his professional debut, the seventh fastest since 1958. However, he could only win four matches. He was forced to withdraw from the November 2012 tournament on Day 9 with a knee injury. He picked up his first kinboshi or gold star for defeating yokozuna Harumafuji in September 2013.

He earned promotion to sekiwake with a strong 10–5 performance in September 2014 in which he went 4–3 against wrestlers ranked in the san'yaku. He then secured a winning record in the subsequent November tournament to remain at sekiwake for the start of 2015. A 5–10 record in January 2015 saw him lose his san'yaku status was followed by another ten losses in March, but he showed some return to form to post winning records in May and July. Between September 2015 and March 2016 he recorded four consecutive 7–8 records at the top end of the maegashira rankings before a 6–9 in May.

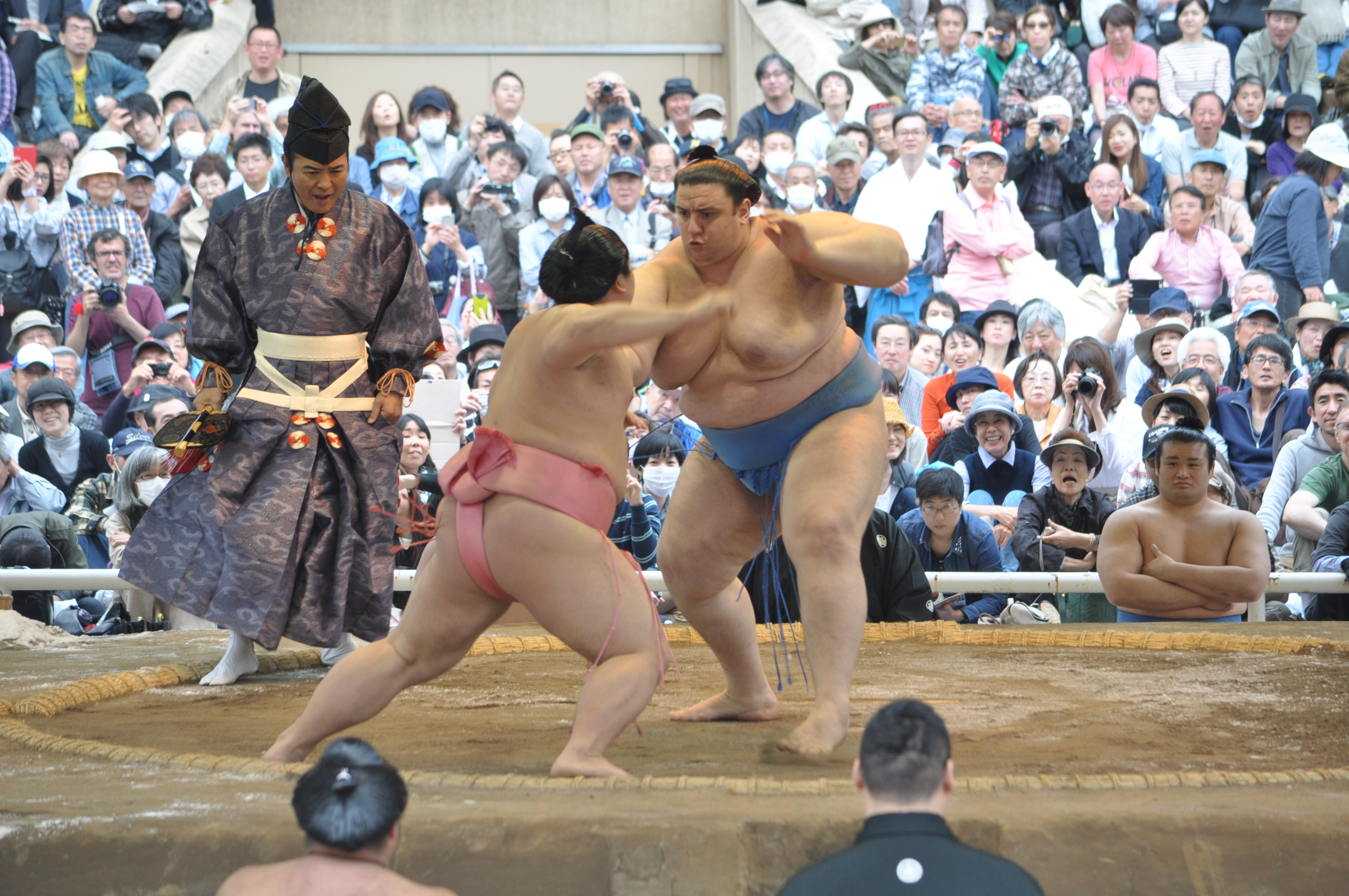
Aoiyama at an exhibition tournament in April 2017

He remained in the upper-to-mid maegashira for the next few tournaments but a 4–11 in May 2017 saw him drop to maegashira 8, his lowest rank for three years. Aoiyama responded to the less challenging schedule by producing a career-best performance in July 2017 – he entered the final day as the only wrestler left in a position to deny Hakuhō his 39th championship. He defeated komusubi Yoshikaze in his last match but was denied the chance to take part in a play-off for the yūshō when Hakuhō also won his final match. Nevertheless, Aoiyama finished in second place on 13–2, winning his second Fighting Spirit prize in the process. He was promoted to maegashira 2 but was forced to miss the first week of the September 2017 tournament due to a "bone contusion" in his left knee. He entered the tournament on Day 8 and was immediately put up against a yokozuna, Harumafuji, the first time this has happened to a late entrant to a tournament since Kitanonada faced a yokozuna in his first bout back at the Nagoya tournament in 1961. He also faced the rest of the san'yaku he was eligible to meet due to his high rank (though spared from facing the top-performing maegashira around him in rank) and managed only 3 wins in the 8 days he competed.

He was forced to withdraw from the November 2017 tournament on Day 3 after injuring ligaments in his right knee in a defeat to Okinoumi the previous day. However, he returned to the tournament on Day 8. Although he won two of his remaining matches this was not enough to prevent him from being demoted to jūryō for the January 2018 tournament. He scored 9–6 in this tournament, which was enough for an immediate return to makuuchi, albeit at the very bottom rank of maegashira 17 East.

In March 2019 he produced his second best score in the top division to date of 12–3, and won the Fighting Spirit Prize. This performance returned him to komusubi for the May 2019 tournament, his first appearance in san'yaku since January 2015 when he was ranked at sekiwake. By March 2020 he had fallen to maegashira 13, but won eleven out of his first twelve matches to be the outright tournament leader on Day 12. He then lost his last three bouts to Takanoshō, Hakuhō and Ishiura to finish out of the running on 11–4. He was however given his first Technique Prize.

Aoiyama turned in his second makuuchi runner-up performance in the March 2021 tournament, finishing with a record of 11–4 at maegashira 12. He was awarded his fourth kantō-shō (Fighting Spirit Prize) for his efforts. He withdrew from the following tournament in May due to lower back pain.

In May 2022 Aoiyama won his first six bouts and was the sole leader of the tournament at that point. His hopes for the championship were ended however on Day 14 when he lost his fifth match. In June 2023, at 37, Aoiyama was the second-oldest active sekitori, behind Tamawashi (38). On his birthday, he declared that he had made efforts to control his weight, having lost 8 kg (18 lb), notably by consuming nimono.

After being demoted to the top jūryō rank for the November 2023 tournament, Aoiyama's 8-win record was enough for him to return to the top division. At the January 2024 tournament, however, Aoiyama, wrestling as Maegashira #17, lost his first six matches. In his Day 6 loss to Kotoshōhō, wrestling as Maegashira #14, Aoiyama was forced from the ring by oshidashi and landed favoring his right leg. Although in obvious pain, Aioyama was able to return to the ring to make his bow. The next day he withdrew from the tournament, with his medical certificate indicating a suspected injury to his right ACL, a potentially career-threatening injury.

=== Retirement ===
Aoiyama dropped back down to the jūryō division in March 2024. Following the September 2024 tournament, with demotion out of salaried status appearing likely, Aoiyama retired from professional competition. At his retirement press conference Aoiyama said he was glad he became a sumo wrestler, adding that his most memorable professional bout was against then-ōzeki Kotoshōgiku in July 2012. He remained with the Sumo Association as a coach under the elder name Iwatomo Kōsuke, which he had inherited following the passing of his stablemate, former maegashira Kimurayama, earlier in the year.

Aoiyama's retirement ceremony was held in the main hall at the Ryōgoku Kokugikan on 7 September 2025. About 280 people attended the ceremony. Aoiyama was reportedly emotional throughout the event, breaking into tears when fellow Bulgarian Naruto (former ōzeki Kotoōshū) took his turn in snipping Aoiyama's chonmage.

== Fighting style ==
Originally, Aoiyama was a yotsu-sumo specialist who preferred grabbing the opponent's mawashi and grappling rather than pushing or thrusting. However, after gaining significant weight following his Makuuchi debut, he started to predominantly use pushing, thrusting and back-step pulling attacks as this had proven extremely effective due to his upper body strength. 55% of his career victories came by way of hatakikomi (slap down), with another 18% by oshidashi (frontal push out).

== Personal life ==
Aoiyama is married to Violeta, an architect from the same area of Bulgaria as himself. They met in 2015 when both were in Bulgaria, and began living together in Japan from July 2016. The marriage was registered in August and the wedding reception was held in a Tokyo hotel in February 2017 with around 230 guests including fellow Dewanoumi group members such as Ura and Mitakeumi. In a May 2015 interview in Bulgaria, Aoiyama stated that he identifies as a Christian.

Aoiyama and his wife Violeta welcomed their first child, Monica, in October 2021. On 16 March 2022, it was announced that he had obtained Japanese citizenship. His legal name is Kōsuke Furuta (古田亘右 (Furuta Kōsuke)).

== Career record ==
Aoiyama Kōsuke
Year	January Hatsu basho, Tokyo	March Haru basho, Osaka	May Natsu basho, Tokyo	July Nagoya basho, Nagoya	September Aki basho, Tokyo	November Kyūshū basho, Fukuoka
2009	x	x	(Banzukegai)	(Maezumo)	West Jonokuchi #30; 7–0; Champion	East Jonidan #25; 7–0–P; Champion
2010	East Sandanme #30; 6–1	East Makushita #48; 7–0; Champion	West Makushita #5; 2–5	West Makushita #15; 4–3	West Makushita #9; 5–2	East Makushita #3; 3–4
2011	West Makushita #5; 4–3	East Makushita #1; Tournament Cancelled; Match fixing investigation 0–0–0	East Makushita #1; 5–2	West Jūryō #4; 7–8	East Jūryō #6; 10–3–2	East Maegashira #16; 11–4; F
2012	West Maegashira #7; 6–9	West Maegashira #10; 8–7	West Maegashira #6; 11–4	East Maegashira #2; 8–7	East Komusubi #1; 4–11	East Maegashira #5; 6–3–6
2013	West Maegashira #6; 7–8	East Maegashira #8; 9–6	East Maegashira #4; 5–10	East Maegashira #9; 10–5	West Maegashira #2; 6–9 ★	East Maegashira #5; 10–5
2014	East Maegashira #3; 6–9	West Maegashira #5; 9–6	East Maegashira #1; 8–7	West Komusubi #1; 6–9	East Maegashira #3; 10–5	East Sekiwake #1; 8–7
2015	East Sekiwake #1; 5–10	West Maegashira #3; 5–10	West Maegashira #6; 9–6	West Maegashira #2; 8–7	East Maegashira #1; 7–8	East Maegashira #2; 7–8
2016	West Maegashira #2; 7–8	East Maegashira #3; 7–8	East Maegashira #3; 6–9	East Maegashira #6; 8–7	East Maegashira #5; 9–6	West Maegashira #1; 4–11
2017	West Maegashira #7; 8–7	West Maegashira #6; 8–7	West Maegashira #3; 4–11	East Maegashira #8; 13–2; F	West Maegashira #2; 3–5–7	East Maegashira #11; 3–8–4
2018	West Jūryō #2; 9–6	East Maegashira #17; 8–7	West Maegashira #13; 8–7	East Maegashira #11; 8–7	East Maegashira #10; 7–8	East Maegashira #12; 11–4
2019	East Maegashira #5; 7–8	East Maegashira #7; 12–3; F	East Komusubi #1; 6–9	East Maegashira #2; 8–7	West Maegashira #1; 5–10	East Maegashira #5; 6–9
2020	East Maegashira #8; 4–11	West Maegashira #13; 11–4; T	West Maegashira #4; Tournament Cancelled; State of Emergency; 0–0–0	West Maegashira #4; 5–10	West Maegashira #7; 7–8	East Maegashira #8; 6–9
2021	West Maegashira #10; 6–9	West Maegashira #12; 11–4; F	East Maegashira #3; 4–3–8	West Maegashira #8; 7–8	East Maegashira #9; 7–8	East Maegashira #9; 4–11
2022	East Maegashira #16; 8–7	West Maegashira #10; 7–8	East Maegashira #11; 10–5	East Maegashira #6; 6–9	East Maegashira #7; 6–9	East Maegashira #10; 7–8
2023	East Maegashira #10; 8–7	East Maegashira #9; 6–9	East Maegashira #12; 5–10	East Maegashira #17; 9–6	East Maegashira #14; 5–10	East Jūryō #1; 8–7
2024	West Maegashira #17; 0–7–8	West Jūryō #11; 7–8	West Jūryō #11; 7–8	West Jūryō #11; 6–9	East Jūryō #13; Retired; 5–10	x
Record given as wins–losses–absences Top division champion Top division runner-up Retired Lower divisions Non-participation Sanshō key: F=Fighting spirit; O=Outstanding performance; T=Technique Also shown: ★=Kinboshi; P=Playoff(s); Divisions: Makuuchi — Jūryō — Makushita — Sandanme — Jonidan — Jonokuchi Makuuchi ranks: Yokozuna — Ōzeki — Sekiwake — Komusubi — Maegashira

== See also ==
- List of sumo tournament top division runners-up
- List of active gold star earners
- Glossary of sumo terms
- List of active sumo wrestlers
- List of non-Japanese sumo wrestlers
- List of sekiwake
- Active special prize winners
