= Wakaazuma Yoshinobu =

Japanese sumo wrestler

Personal information
- Native name: 若東 吉信
- Born: Fernando Yoshinobu Kuroda; April 21, 1976 (age 50) São Paulo, Brazil
- Height: 1.75 m (5 ft 9 in)
- Weight: 120.5 kg (266 lb; 18.98 st)

Sport
- Sport: Sumo
- Retired: May 2003
- Heya: Tamanoi
- Record: 251-217-30
- Debut: September, 1991
- Highest rank: Jūryō 13 (May, 2001)
- Updated on 31 August 2022

Wakaazuma Yoshinobu (Japanese: 若東 吉信, born April 21, 1976, as Fernando Yoshinobu Kuroda (黒田 吉信 フェルナンド, Kuroda Yoshinobu Ferunando)), is a retired second generation Japanese Brazilian professional sumo wrestler (rikishi) from São Paulo, Brazil. Making his debut in September 1991, he reached the jūryō division in May 2001. His highest rank was jūryō 13. He retired from professional sumo in May 2003, going back to Brazil, where he opened many successful restaurants.

== Early life and sumo background ==
Yoshinobu started training when he was 4 years old, as his father was a coach in a sumo club in São Paulo, in addition to sumo wrestling he also practiced swimming and soccer. In junior high school, Yoshinobu visited Fujishima stable to train alongside professional sumo wrestlers. When he was 15 years old, he met future ozeki Tochiazuma while he was in a trip to Brazil, where they became good friends. After graduating from junior high school, he and three other friends from the sumo club where he trained decided to go to Japan to become professional sumo wrestlers. Yoshinobu also wanted to become a rikishi because his father, who tried to become a rikishi in his youth, failed the new disciples test due to his small stature. In September 1991, Yoshinobu and his friends officially joined Tamanoi stable.

== Career ==
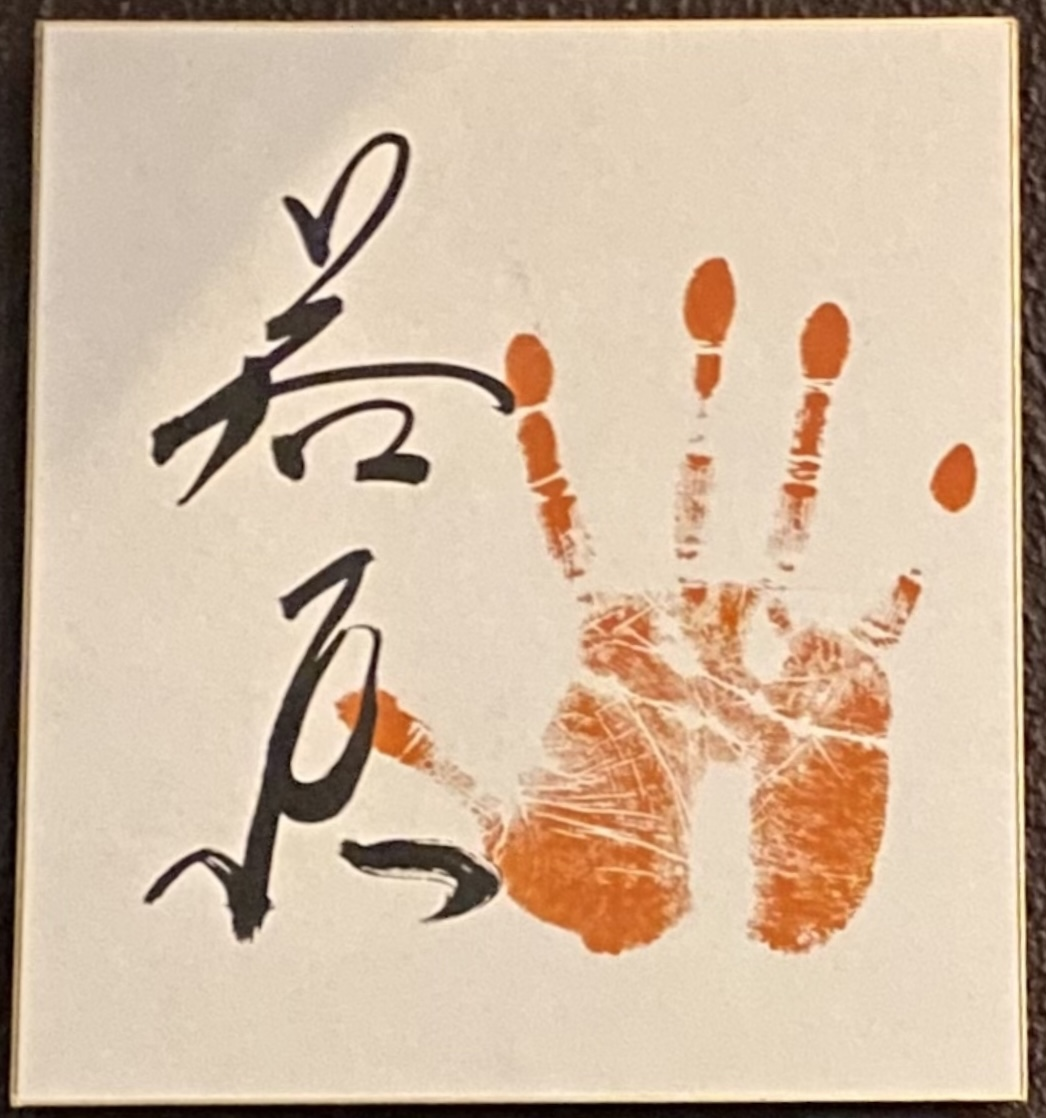
Tegata (hand print autograph) of Wakaazuma

When joining the stable, Yoshinobu was given the shikona (ring name) of "Wakaazuma" (若東) and he weighed only 70 kg on his first tournament. Even so, Wakaazuma had a good performance and even took part in a playoff for the jonokuchi yusho. He continued his career moving through the ranks, but he struggled on the makushita division where he stayed most of his career. However, in May 2001, after 58 tournaments, Wakaazuma was able to be promoted to the second division of jūryō, one of the only two divisions where a rikishi receives a monthly salary. Wakaazuma was the third brazilian in Sumo History to become a sekitori, after his stablemates and friends from the São Paulo sumo club, Ryūdō, in March 1994, and Kuniazuma, in September 2000. However, in his debut tournament in jūryō, Wakaazuma finished the tournament with a 4-11, a strong losing record, which immediately demoted him back to the makushita division.

Wakaazuma would remain in the lower divisions for the rest of his career in sumo and after 6 straight tournaments ending with losing records and with worsening injuries in his knees, he decided to retire from competition and return to Brazil.

== Retirement from sumo ==
Even after retiring from professional sumo, Yoshinobu continued training in the São Paulo sumo clubs and is sensei and chairman in the local sumo association. He also opened many restaurants in his hometown, including the "Izakaya Kuroda" and the "Kinboshi Karaokê", where he serves mainly hot dishes from the more traditional Japanese cuisine. Yoshinobu also helped train future sekiwake Kaisei in the sumo clubs in São Paulo and helped him become a professional sumo wrestler by presenting him to Tomozuna stable.

== Fighting style ==
Wakaazuma was a wrestler who preferred grappling to pushing and thrusting techniques. He specialized in kuisagari, a tactic used by smaller wrestlers which involved pushing his head against the opponent's chest while pushing on the front part of the mawashi. His most common winning kimarite were yorikiri (force out), oshidashi (push out), and shitatenage (underarm throw).

== Career record ==
Wakaazuma Yoshinobu
Year	January Hatsu basho, Tokyo	March Haru basho, Osaka	May Natsu basho, Tokyo	July Nagoya basho, Nagoya	September Aki basho, Tokyo	November Kyūshū basho, Fukuoka
1991	x	x	x	x	(Maezumō)	West Jonokuchi #32; 6–1–P
1992	West Jonidan #82; 4–3	West Jonidan #59; 5–2	East Jonidan #20; 2–5	West Jonidan #50; 4–3	East Jonidan #25; 5–2	West Sandanme #88; Sat out due to injury 0–0–7
1993	East Jonidan #48; Sat out due to injury 0–0–7	West Jonidan #118; 6–1	East Jonidan #42; 5–2	East Jonidan #2; 6–1	East Sandanme #46; 4–3	East Sandanme #31; 5–2
1994	East Sandanme #6; 5–2	East Makushita #45; 3–4	West Sandanme #2; 4–3	East Makushita #52; 4–3	East Makushita #42; 3–4	East Makushita #53; 4–3
1995	West Makushita #41; 2–4–1	East Sandanme #1; Sat out due to injury 0–0–7	East Sandanme #1; 3–4	West Sandanme #16; 5–2	East Makushita #56; 3–4	East Sandanme #8; 4–3
1996	West Makushita #58; 4–3	East Makushita #47; 4–3	East Makushita #36; 2–5	East Makushita #57; 4–3	West Makushita #45; 6–1	East Makushita #21; 4–3
1997	East Makushita #14; 4–3	West Makushita #10; 3–4	West Makushita #17; 4–3	East Makushita #11; 1–6	West Makushita #42; 5–2	East Makushita #23; 3–4
1998	West Makushita #31; 6–1	East Makushita #13; 3–4	West Makushita #19; 3–4	East Makushita #27; 4–3	West Makushita #20; 5–2	West Makushita #11; 2–5
1999	East Makushita #30; 4–3	West Makushita #22; 4–3	East Makushita #17; 4–3	West Makushita #11; 4–3	West Makushita #6; 2–5	East Makushita #18; 4–3
2000	East Makushita #14; 3–4	East Makushita #22; 4–3	West Makushita #17; 4–3	West Makushita #12; 3–3–1	West Makushita #18; 4–3	West Makushita #11; 5–2
2001	West Makushita #6; 4–3	West Makushita #4; 4–3	West Jūryō #13; 4–11	West Makushita #7; 4–3	East Makushita #5; 2–5	East Makushita #16; 3–4
2002	East Makushita #24; 6–1	West Makushita #9; 4–3	West Makushita #5; 3–4	West Makushita #9; 2–5	West Makushita #21; 2–5	East Makushita #40; 3–4
2003	West Makushita #51; 3–4	East Sandanme #4; 3–4	West Sandanme #16; Retired; 0–0–7	x	x	x
Record given as wins–losses–absences Top division champion Top division runner-up Retired Non-participation Jūryō Lower divisions Sanshō key: F=Fighting spirit; O=Outstanding performance; T=Technique Also shown: ★=Kinboshi; P=Playoff(s); Divisions: Makuuchi — Jūryō — Makushita — Sandanme — Jonidan — Jonokuchi Makuuchi ranks: Yokozuna — Ōzeki — Sekiwake — Komusubi — Maegashira

== See also ==
- Glossary of sumo terms
- List of non-Japanese sumo wrestlers
- List of past sumo wrestlers
