= Aotsurugi Kenta =

Tongan sumo wrestler (born 1982)

Personal information
- Native name: 碧剣 健太
- Born: Tevita Lato Taufa; 16 December 1982 (age 43) Tonga
- Height: 1.83 m (6 ft 0 in)
- Weight: 126.5 kg (279 lb)

Sport
- Sport: Sumo
- Retired: May, 2009
- Heya: Tagonoura
- Record: 154-126-42
- Debut: March, 2001
- Highest rank: Sandanme 1 (January, 2009)
- Championships: 1 (Jonokuchi)
- Updated on May 2009

Aotsurugi Kenta (born 16 December 1982 as Tevita Lato Taufa) is a former professional sumo wrestler from Tongatapu, Tonga. He made his debut in 2001 but had many injury problems. In 2006, he obtained Japanese citizenship, adopting the official name of Tebita Togawa. He retired in May 2009.

== Career ==
As an amateur he competed in the lightweight category at the Junior World Sumo Championships in 2000, just missing out on a bronze medal. He made his professional debut in March 2001, joining the small Tagonoura stable. His first shikona or fighting name was Hisanoumi. He reached as high as sandanme 24 in the fourth highest division in November 2004, but injury meant he was not able to participate in any tournaments from November 2005 until September 2006. As a result, he fell off the banzuke (ranking list) completely in July 2006.

He finally returned to the ring in November 2006 and fought three maezumo (pre-sumo) bouts – effectively beginning his career all over again from the very bottom. He won all three bouts. At the end of 2006 he acquired Japanese citizenship. This allowed the Tagonoura stable to circumvent the Sumo Association's "one foreigner per heya" rule and recruit another Tongan. He reappeared on the banzuke in January 2007, ranked at jonokuchi 29. He then took the jonokuchi championship with a 6–1 record. By May 2007 he had progressed to jonidan 20 where he turned in another fine 6–1 score. This earned him promotion back to sandanme for July. In his first tournament in sandanme since September 2005 he could manage only a 2–5 score. In the September 2007 tournament, despite missing his first bout, he went on to record five wins and just one loss.

At the end of 2007 he changed his shikona from Hisanoumi Taiyō to Aotsurugi Kenta. His score of 4–3 at Sandanme 25 in the September 2008 tournament pushed him up to a new highest rank of Sandanme 12 for November 2008 and he reached the top of the division in the January 2009 tournament. He scored three wins against four losses at Sandanme 1 in that tournament. He missed the May 2009 tournament, and announced his retirement from sumo. Although he had had knee problems in the past, his stablemaster Tagonoura Oyakata (the former Kushimaumi) said that he had simply lost the will to fight.

== Career record ==
Aotsurugi Kenta
Year	January Hatsu basho, Tokyo	March Haru basho, Osaka	May Natsu basho, Tokyo	July Nagoya basho, Nagoya	September Aki basho, Tokyo	November Kyūshū basho, Fukuoka
2001	x	(Maezumo)	East Jonokuchi #25; 5–2	East Jonidan #95; 4–3	East Jonidan #74; 3–4	West Jonidan #92; 4–3
2002	West Jonidan #66; 4–3	West Jonidan #42; 3–4	East Jonidan #62; 5–2	West Jonidan #22; 3–4	West Jonidan #45; 5–2	West Jonidan #6; 2–5
2003	East Jonidan #40; 4–3	West Jonidan #18; 3–4	East Jonidan #38; 4–3	West Jonidan #16; 4–3	East Sandanme #98; 5–2	West Sandanme #61; 1–6
2004	West Sandanme #94; 5–2	West Sandanme #60; 2–5	West Sandanme #86; 5–2	East Sandanme #53; 4–3	East Sandanme #36; 4–3	East Sandanme #24; 1–6
2005	West Sandanme #56; 4–3	East Sandanme #38; 3–4	East Sandanme #55; 5–2	West Sandanme #28; 1–2–4	West Sandanme #65; 4–3	East Sandanme #51; Sat out due to injury 0–0–7
2006	West Jonidan #11; Sat out due to injury 0–0–7	West Jonidan #81; Sat out due to injury 0–0–7	West Jonokuchi #9; Sat out due to injury 0–0–7	(Banzukegai)	(Banzukegai)	(Maezumo)
2007	West Jonokuchi #29; 6–1–PP; Champion	East Jonidan #61; 5–2	West Jonidan #20; 6–1	West Sandanme #57; 2–5	West Sandanme #81; 5–1–1	East Sandanme #51; 4–2–1
2008	East Sandanme #38; 3–4	West Sandanme #47; 2–4–1	West Sandanme #73; 3–4	West Sandanme #83; 6–1	East Sandanme #25; 4–3	East Sandanme #12; 4–3
2009	West Sandanme #1; 3–4	West Sandanme #15; 4–3	West Sandanme #4; Retired; 0–0–7	x	x	x
Record given as wins–losses–absences Top division champion Top division runner-up Retired Lower divisions Non-participation Sanshō key: F=Fighting spirit; O=Outstanding performance; T=Technique Also shown: ★=Kinboshi; P=Playoff(s); Divisions: Makuuchi — Jūryō — Makushita — Sandanme — Jonidan — Jonokuchi Makuuchi ranks: Yokozuna — Ōzeki — Sekiwake — Komusubi — Maegashira

== See also ==
- Glossary of sumo terms
- List of non-Japanese sumo wrestlers
- List of past sumo wrestlers
