= Kushimaumi Keita =

Japanese sumo wrestler

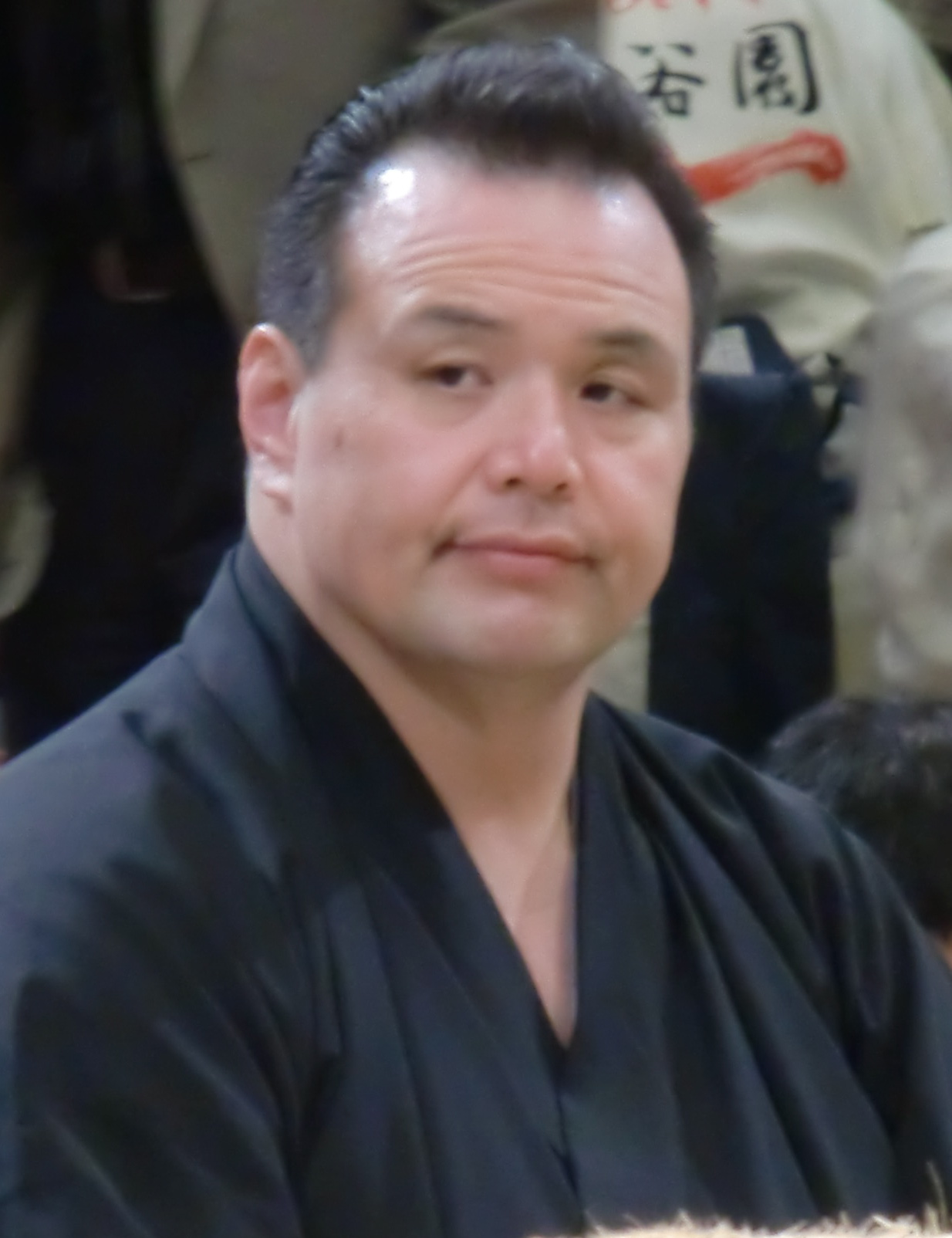

Personal information
- Native name: 久島海 啓太
- Born: Keita Kushima; 6 August 1965 Wakayama, Japan
- Died: 13 February 2012 (aged 46) Tokyo
- Height: 1.87 m (6 ft 1 1/2 in)
- Weight: 203 kg (448 lb)

Sport
- Sport: Sumo
- University team: Nihon University
- Retired: November 1998
- Heya: Dewanoumi
- Record: 462-442-15
- Debut: January 1988
- Highest rank: Maegashira 1 (March 1991)
- Elder name: Tagonoura
- Championships: 3 (Jūryō)
- Special Prizes: Fighting Spirit (2)
- Gold Stars: 2 (Hokutoumi, Asahifuji)
- Updated on June 2020

Kushimaumi Keita (久島海 啓太; 6 August 1965 – 13 February 2012), born as Keita Kushima (久嶋 啓太), was a sumo wrestler from Shingū, Wakayama Prefecture, Japan. A successful amateur, his highest rank in professional sumo was maegashira 1. After his retirement he became an elder of the Japan Sumo Association and established Tagonoura stable.

== Career ==
He began doing sumo from the age of four, due to his father's love of the sport. In 1985 he won the All Japan Sumo Championships, making him the first person to earn the amateur yokozuna title whilst still in high school. At this time he already weighed 160 kg). He continued amateur sumo at Nihon University. In total he captured 28 collegiate sumo titles, a record at the time. He joined the prestigious Dewanoumi stable and made his professional debut in January 1988, beginning in the third highest makushita division. He fought under his own name until he reached the second highest jūryō division, whereupon his shikona was modified slightly from Kushima to Kushimaumi. Although it took him seven tournaments to progress from makushita to jūryō, he then won two consecutive yūshō or tournament championships from his jūryō debut, winning in March in a two-way playoff, and in May in a five-way playoff. He reached the top makuuchi division in July 1989, the first wrestler to do so since 15-day tournaments were established in 1949. In September 1989 he set a new record for consecutive kachi-koshi from makushita tsukedashi debut, with 11. He won his first Fighting Spirit prize in March 1990, and earned two kinboshi for defeating yokozuna Asahifuji in September 1991 and Hokutoumi in March 1992 (this was Hokutoumi's final match before retirement). In March 1993 he was famously knocked out by a harite (slap to the face) from Kyokudōzan and had to withdraw from the tournament with his score at seven wins and six losses. His best result in a top division tournament was his runner-up performance in September 1993, where he finished behind Akebono on twelve wins and won his second Fighting Spirit prize. This however, was achieved from the low position of maegashira 13, and despite his great potential he never managed to reach the san'yaku ranks. In his later career he suffered increasingly from shoulder and hip injuries, and was demoted to the jūryō division on several occasions. In November 1998 he was somewhat unfortunate to be demoted to makushita 1 with four wins at what appeared to be a comfortably high rank of jūryō 5 in the previous tournament, as this had never previously happened, but Miyabiyama had won the makushita championship with a perfect 7-0 record from makushita 6 and could not be denied promotion. Kushimaumi chose not to compete in makushita and announced his retirement instead at the age of 33. His danpatsu-shiki or official retirement ceremony was held in May 1999.

== Fighting style ==
Kushimaumi was one of the heaviest wrestlers ever, weighing over 200 kilograms (440 lb) at his peak, and his great physical strength was demonstrated by his frequent use of the kimedashi (arm barring force out) technique. He also regularly employed yorikiri (the force out) and kotenage (the arm lock throw).

== Retirement from sumo ==
Kushimaumi remained with Dewanoumi stable as an elder of the Japan Sumo Association, initially under his old shikona (known as jun-toshiyori status). In August 1999 he assumed the Tagonoura elder name after the previous holder, ex-komusubi Sadanoumi, left the Sumo Association. In February 2000 he branched out and opened up his own Tagonoura stable. In 2011 he produced his first sekitori ranked wrestler, the Bulgarian Aoiyama. Another former rikishi was the Tongan born Aotsurugi (who took Japanese citizenship to allow Aoiyama to join the stable). He was a judge of tournament bouts from 2006.

In 2003 he suffered an acute myocardial infarction, but it proved not to be life-threatening and he made an immediate recovery. He then went on a diet and lost around 60 kilos. As a result, he became interested in healthy cooking and had a series of recipes published in a Kodansha magazine, and his wife released a cookbook in 2008.

He died suddenly on 13 February 2012 at the age of 46, of ischaemic heart disease. Aoiyama, Kitanoumi Oyakata, and Dewanoumi Oyakata were among the guests at his funeral in the Kan'ei-ji temple. As there was no-one available to take over, Tagonoura stable was dissolved with his wrestlers split between the Dewanoumi and Kasugano stables.

== Family ==
Kushimaumi's much younger brother Keita Yoshimura (born 1991) joined Tagonoura stable in 2007 and moved to Dewanoumi stable upon his brother's death, changing his shikona from Aoijo back to his own surname. He is active as of 2019 and has a highest rank of sandanme 72.

== Career record ==
Kushimaumi Keita
Year	January Hatsu basho, Tokyo	March Haru basho, Osaka	May Natsu basho, Tokyo	July Nagoya basho, Nagoya	September Aki basho, Tokyo	November Kyūshū basho, Fukuoka
1988	Makushita tsukedashi #60; 5–2	East Makushita #38; 5–2	East Makushita #24; 6–1	East Makushita #9; 5–2	East Makushita #4; 4–3	West Makushita #2; 4–3
1989	East Makushita #1; 4–3	West Jūryō #12; 11–4–P; Champion	East Jūryō #3; 10–5–PPP; Champion	West Maegashira #13; 8–7	West Maegashira #11; 9–6	East Maegashira #5; 6–9
1990	East Maegashira #9; 6–9	East Maegashira #14; 10–5; F	East Maegashira #4; 6–9	West Maegashira #8; 5–8–2	East Jūryō #1; 10–5	East Maegashira #12; 9–6
1991	East Maegashira #6; 8–7	East Maegashira #1; 5–10	East Maegashira #6; 6–9	East Maegashira #10; 10–5	East Maegashira #3; 8–7 ★	East Maegashira #3; 6–9
1992	West Maegashira #6; 8–7	West Maegashira #3; 7–8 ★	West Maegashira #4; 8–7	East Maegashira #3; 6–9	West Maegashira #6; 8–7	West Maegashira #2; 8–7
1993	West Maegashira #1; 7–8	West Maegashira #2; 7–7–1	East Maegashira #4; 6–9	West Maegashira #7; 5–10	East Maegashira #13; 12–3; F	West Maegashira #1; 5–10
1994	West Maegashira #7; 1–2–12	East Jūryō #4; 9–6	East Jūryō #2; 8–7	West Maegashira #15; 8–7	East Maegashira #15; 8–7	East Maegashira #9; 8–7
1995	West Maegashira #4; 3–12	East Maegashira #12; 4–11	East Jūryō #5; 7–8	West Jūryō #6; 9–6	West Jūryō #2; 9–6	East Jūryō #1; 8–7
1996	East Jūryō #1; 7–8	East Jūryō #2; 10–5	East Jūryō #1; 8–7	West Maegashira #15; 6–9	West Jūryō #2; 6–9	East Jūryō #7; 6–9
1997	West Jūryō #9; 11–4	East Jūryō #4; 8–7	West Jūryō #2; 9–6	West Jūryō #1; 9–6	West Maegashira #13; 7–8	West Maegashira #15; 3–12
1998	West Jūryō #6; 7–8	East Jūryō #9; 12–3–P; Champion	West Jūryō #2; 7–8	East Jūryō #4; 7–8	West Jūryō #5; 4–11	East Makushita #1; Retired; 0–0–7
Record given as wins–losses–absences Top division champion Top division runner-up Retired Lower divisions Non-participation Sanshō key: F=Fighting spirit; O=Outstanding performance; T=Technique Also shown: ★=Kinboshi; P=Playoff(s); Divisions: Makuuchi — Jūryō — Makushita — Sandanme — Jonidan — Jonokuchi Makuuchi ranks: Yokozuna — Ōzeki — Sekiwake — Komusubi — Maegashira

== See also ==
- List of sumo tournament second division champions
- Glossary of sumo terms
- List of past sumo wrestlers
