= Yashinoshima =

Tongan sumo wrestler

Yashinoshima (椰子島, born 28 October 1952 as Moleni Fe'aomoeata Tauki'uvea) is a former sumo wrestler from Tonga. He was one of six Tongan wrestlers recruited by the Asahiyama stable. He made his debut in November 1974. He won the jonokuchi division championship or yusho in January 1975 with a perfect 7–0 record. He reached his highest rank of Makushita 53 in March 1976. He was forced to quit sumo in September 1976 after he and his fellow Tongans refused to accept the new head of the stable following the death of the man who had recruited them.
